= 2025 Chicago Fire FC season =

Chicago Fire FC
2025 season
- Owner: Joe Mansueto
- Head coach: Gregg Berhalter
- Stadium: Soldier Field (capacity: 61,500); SeatGeek Stadium (four games plus playoffs) (capacity: 20,000)
- MLS: Conference: 8th Overall: 13th
- MLS Cup playoffs: Round One
- Open Cup: Quarter-finals
- Top goalscorer: League: Hugo Cuypers (17); All: Hugo Cuypers (19)
- Highest home attendance: April 13th vs Miami (62,358)
- Lowest home attendance: March 29 vs Montreal (16,278)
- Average home league attendance: 23,479
| Home colors | Away colors |

The 2025 Chicago Fire FC season was the club's 28th season in Major League Soccer. This was the club's first season under owner Joe Mansuetto without sporting director Georg Heitz, who stepped down following the previous season's conclusion. It was announced that he, alongside head coach Frank Klopas, would be replaced by former USMNT and Columbus Crew head coach Gregg Berhalter on October 8, 2024, with Berhalter formally taking over on October 20. Following the team's 5-3 victory over Inter Miami on September 30, the club qualified for the playoffs for the first time since 2017. They would also win their first MLS Cup Playoff game since 2009, defeating Orlando 3-1 in the wild card game on October 22. They would ultimately be eliminated in the next round against the Philadelphia Union.

== Current squad ==
Players signed as of August 22, 2025

| No. | Name | Date of birth (age) | Date Joined | Previous club | Player Notes |
Goalkeepers
| 1 | (United States) Chris Brady | March 3, 2004 (aged 21) | March 24, 2020 | (United States) Chicago Fire Academy | Homegrown |
| 25 | (United States) Jeff Gal | April 6, 1993 (aged 32) | January 11, 2023 | (Sweden) Degerfors IF | |
Defenders
| 2 | (Portugal) Leonardo Barroso | June 16, 2005 (aged 20) | January 14, 2025 | (Portugal) Sporting CP B | International; U-22 |
| 3 | (England) Jack Elliott | August 25, 1995 (aged 30) | December 16, 2024 | (United States) Philadelphia Union | TAM |
| 5 | (United States) Sam Rogers | May 17, 1999 (aged 26) | January 13, 2025 | (Norway) Lillestrøm SK | |
| 14 | (Serbia) Viktor Radojević | July 14, 2004 (aged 21) | August 22, 2025 | (Serbia) FK TSC | International; U-22 |
| 15 | (United States) Andrew Gutman | October 2, 1996 (aged 29) | December 12, 2023 | (United States) Colorado Rapids | |
| 16 | (Canada) Joel Waterman | January 24, 1996 (aged 29) | August 20, 2025 | (Canada) CF Montréal | International |
| 24 | (United States) Jonathan Dean | May 15, 1997 (aged 28) | January 12, 2023 | (United States) Birmingham Legion FC | |
| 34 | (United States) Omar Gonzalez | October 11, 1988 (aged 37) | February 7, 2025 | (United States) FC Dallas | |
| 36 | (United States) Justin Reynolds | April 8, 2004 (aged 21) | May 12, 2022 | (United States) Chicago Fire FC II | Homegrown |
| 38 | (United States) Christopher Cupps | May 26, 2006 (aged 19) | February 18, 2025 | (United States) Chicago Fire Academy | Homegrown |
| 77 | (United States) Chase Gasper | January 25, 1996 (aged 29) | January 30, 2024 | (United States) Houston Dynamo | |
Defenders/Midfielders
| 22 | (United States) Mauricio Pineda | October 17, 1997 (aged 28) | January 17, 2020 | (United States) North Carolina Tar Heels | |
Midfielders
| 6 | (Mali) Rominigue Kouamé | December 17, 1996 (aged 28) | January 24, 2025 | (Spain) Cádiz CF | Loaned In; International; TAM |
| 23 | (United States) Kellyn Acosta | July 24, 1995 (aged 30) | February 13, 2024 | (United States) LAFC | TAM |
| 35 | (United States) Sergio Oregel | May 16, 2005 (aged 20) | October 23, 2021 | (United States) Chicago Fire Academy | Homegrown |
| 37 | (United States) Robert Turdean | January 14, 2010 (aged 15) | January 22, 2025 | (United States) Chicago Fire Academy | Off-Roster Homegrown |
| 42 | (Ivory Coast) Djé D'Avilla | May 5, 2003 (aged 22) | April 1, 2025 | (Portugal) U.D. Leiria | International; U-22 |
| 47 | (United States) Sam Williams | March 18, 2005 (aged 20) | March 14, 2025 | (United States) Chicago Fire FC II | Homegrown (Note: Williams joined the Fire on three temporary loans- February 22 vs Columbus, March 1 vs DC, and March 8 vs Dallas before being signed to the first team as a homegrown following a trade with the New York Red Bulls) |
Midfielders/Forwards
| 7 | (Switzerland) Maren Haile-Selassie | March 13, 1999 (aged 26) | December 27, 2022 | (Switzerland) FC Lugano | International |
| 8 | (United States) Chris Mueller | August 29, 1996 (aged 29) | May 5, 2022 | (Scotland) Hibernian F.C. | TAM; Season Ending Injury |
| 10 | (Portugal) André Franco | April 12, 1998 (aged 27) | August 13, 2025 | (Portugal) FC Porto | Loaned In; International; TAM |
| 11 | (Denmark) Philip Zinckernagel | December 16, 1994 (aged 30) | January 6, 2025 | (Belgium) Club Brugge KV | International; TAM |
| 17 | (United States) Brian Gutiérrez | June 17, 2003 (aged 22) | March 9, 2020 | (United States) Chicago Fire Academy | Homegrown; U22 Initiative |
| 19 | (Ivory Coast) Jonathan Bamba | March 26, 1996 (aged 29) | January 21, 2025 | (Spain) RC Celta de Vigo | DP; International |
| 27 | (United States) Dylan Borso | June 2, 2006 (aged 19) | December 20, 2024 | (United States) Wake Forest | Homegrown |
| 29 | (United States) David Poreba | December 1, 2002 (aged 22) | December 12, 2024 | (United States) Chicago Fire FC II | |
Forwards
| 9 | (Belgium) Hugo Cuypers | February 7, 1997 (aged 28) | February 6, 2024 | (Belgium) Gent | International; Designated Player |
| 12 | (United States) Tom Barlow | July 8, 1995 (aged 30) | December 18, 2023 | (United States) New York Red Bulls | |
| 28 | (United States) Dean Boltz | June 7, 2006 (aged 19) | December 20, 2024 | (United States) University of Wisconsin | |

=== Loaned Out ===
| Name | Position | Date of birth (age) | Loaned To |
|---|---|---|---|
| (United States) Bryan Dowd (Note: Dowd was recalled from his loan to FC Tulsa then loaned to the Fire's second team) | GK | May 8, 2002 (aged 23) | (United States) Chicago Fire FC II |
| (Guyana) Omari Glasgow | FW | November 22, 2003 (aged 21) | (United States) Loudoun United FC |
| (Greece) Georgios Koutsias | FW | February 8, 2004 (aged 21) | (Switzerland) FC Lugano |

=== Temporary Players ===
Below are players that joined the Fire from Fire II on short-term loans during the season. Players are allowed to be called up to four games and cannot play in more than two games.

| No. | Name | Position | Date of birth (age) | Games Joined For |
|---|---|---|---|---|
| 42 (former) | (Netherlands) Diego Konincks | DF | November 30, 2000 (aged 24) | March 22 vs Vancouver; March 29 vs Montreal |
| 44 | (United States) Jason Shokalook | FW | September 30, 2002 (aged 23) | June 7 vs DC; June 14 vs Nashville |
| 45 | (El Salvador) Harold Osorio | MF | August 20, 2003 (aged 22) | February 22 vs Columbus; March 1 vs DC; March 8 vs Dallas; March 15 vs Toronto |
| 48 | (United States) Richard Fleming III | MF | July 7, 2004 (aged 21) | August 9 vs LAFC |
| 68 | (United States) Vitaliy Hlyut | FW | April 29, 2008 (aged 17) | June 7 vs DC; June 14 vs Nashville |

== Player movement ==
=== Returning, options, and new contracts ===
| Date | Player | Position | Notes | Ref |
|---|---|---|---|---|
| October 22, 2024 | (United States) Jonathan Dean | DF | Option exercised | |
| October 22, 2024 | (United States) Jeff Gal | GK | Option Exercised | |
| November 27, 2024 | (United States) Bryan Dowd | GK | Returned from his loan to Huntsville City FC and had his option exercised | |
| May 9, 2025 | (United States) Bryan Dowd | GK | Returned early from his loan to FC Tulsa | |
| September 16, 2025 | (United States) Chris Brady | GK | Signed to a new contract through 2029 with an option for 2030 | |
| September 16, 2025 | (United States) Sergio Oregel | MF | Signed to a new contract through 2028 with an option for 2029 | |
| September 16, 2025 | (United States) Mauricio Pineda | MF | Signed to a new contract through 2027 with an option for 2028 | |
| September 22, 2025 | (United States) Jonathan Dean | DF | Signed to a new contract through 2027 with an option for 2028 | |
| September 22, 2025 | (United States) Jeff Gal | GK | Signed to a new contract through 2026 with an option for 2027 | |
| September 22, 2025 | (United States) Chris Mueller | FW | Signed to a new contract through 2026 with an option for 2027 | |
| October 25, 2025 | (United States) Dean Boltz | FW | Recalled early from his loan to Forward Madison | |

=== In ===
| Date | Player | Position | Previous club | Notes | Ref |
|---|---|---|---|---|---|
| December 12, 2024 | (United States) David Poreba | MF/FW | (United States) Chicago Fire FC II | Signed a first team contract for 2025 with options through 2028 | |
| December 16, 2024 | (England) Jack Elliott | DF | (United States) Philadelphia Union | Signed as a free agent for 2025 with an option for 2026 | |
| December 17, 2024 | (Guyana) Omari Glasgow | MF/FW | (United States) Chicago Fire FC II | Signed a first team contract through 2026 with options for 2027 and 2028 | |
| December 20, 2024 | (United States) Dylan Borso | MF/FW | (United States) Wake Forest | Signed as a homegrown through 2027 with options for 2028 and 2029 | |
| December 20, 2024 | (United States) Dean Boltz | FW | (United States) University of Wisconsin | Drafted third overall by the Fire, and having signed a Generation Adidas contract with MLS, was automatically added to the Fire's roster | |
| January 6, 2025 | (Denmark) Philip Zinckernagel | MF/FW | (Belgium) Club Brugge KV | Joined from Club Brugge as a TAM signing through 2028 | |
| January 13, 2025 | (United States) Sam Rogers | DF | (Norway) Lillestrøm SK | Joined from Lillestrøm on a contract through 2026 with options for 2027 and 2028 | |
| January 14, 2025 | (Portugal) Leonardo Barroso | DF | (Portugal) Sporting CP B | Joined as a U-22 initiative signing from Sporting through 2028 with an option for 2029 | |
| January 21, 2025 | (Ivory Coast) Jonathan Bamba | MF/FW | (Spain) RC Celta de Vigo | Joined as a DP from Celta de Vigo through 2027 with an option for 2028 | |
| January 22, 2025 | (United States) Robert Turdean | MF | (United States) Chicago Fire Academy | Signed as a Homegrown through 2028 with options for 2029 and 2030 | |
| February 7, 2025 | (United States) Omar Gonzalez | DF | (United States) FC Dallas | Signed to a one year contract with an option for 2025 | |
| February 18, 2025 | (United States) Christopher Cupps | DF | (United States) Chicago Fire Academy | Signed to a Homegrown deal through 2028 with options for | |
| March 14, 2025 | (United States) Sam Williams | MF | (United States) Chicago Fire FC II | Homegrown rights were acquired from the New York Red Bulls for $100k in GAM plus a possible $75k more after Williams signed a contract with Fire II during the offseason | |
| April 1, 2025 | (Ivory Coast) Djé D'Avilla | MF | (Portugal) U.D. Leiria | Joined as a U-22 initiative player through 2028 with an option for 2029 | |
| August 20, 2025 | (Canada) Joel Waterman | DF | (Canada) CF Montréal | Acquired from Montreal in exchange for $200,000 in GAM in 2025 and $300,000 in GAM in 2026, along with $100,000 in additional GAM if certain parameters are met | |
| August 22, 2025 | (Serbia) Viktor Radojević | DF | (Serbia) FK TSC | Acquired as a U-22 player on a contract through 2028 with an option for 2029 | |

=== Loaned In ===
| Date | Player | Position | Loaning Club | Notes | Ref |
|---|---|---|---|---|---|
| January 24, 2025 | (Mali) Rominigue Kouamé | MF | (Spain) Cádiz CF | Loaned in through the end of the season with an option to buy | |
| August 13, 2025 | (Portugal) André Franco | MF/FW | (Portugal) FC Porto | Loaned in through the end of the season with an option to but | |

=== Out ===
| Date | Player | Position | Destination Club | Notes | Ref |
|---|---|---|---|---|---|
| October 22, 2024 | (Switzerland) Allan Arigoni | DF | (Switzerland) FC Lugano | Loan ended following the 2024 season and the Fire declined his purchase option | |
| October 22, 2024 | (United States) Javier Casas | MF | Retired | Out of contract | |
| October 22, 2024 | (Germany) Rafael Czichos | DF | (United States) Phoenix Rising FC | Out of contract | |
| October 22, 2024 | (Germany) Fabian Herbers | MF/FW | (Canada) CF Montreal | Out of contract | |
| October 22, 2024 | (Costa Rica) Ariel Lassiter | MF/FW | (United States) Portland Timbers | Out of contract | |
| October 22, 2024 | (United States) Wyatt Omsberg | DF | (United States) New England Revolution | Out of contract | |
| October 22, 2024 | (United States) Spencer Richey | GK | Retired | Out of contract | |
| November 13, 2024 | (United States) Victor Bezerra | FW | Retired | Announced that he was leaving the club on social media after returning on loan from Detroit City FC; this was confirmed by the club on November 27 | |
| November 27, 2024 | (United States) Missael Rodríguez | FW | (United States) The Town FC | Returned from his loan to Union Omaha and was ultimately waived | |
| November 27, 2024 | (England) Laurence Wootton | MF | (United States) Union Omaha | Returned from his loan to Indy Eleven and had his option declined | |
| December 24, 2024 | (Paraguay) Gastón Giménez | MF | (Paraguay) Cerro Porteño | Gimenez and the Fire mutually agreed to terminate his contract | |
| January 2, 2025 | (Denmark) Tobias Salquist | DF | (Denmark) FC Nordsjælland | Transferred to Nordsjælland for an undisclosed amount | |
| January 26, 2025 | (Argentina) Federico Navarro | MF | (Argentina) Rosario Central | Transferred to Rosario Central for an undisclosed fee | |
| February 13, 2025 | (France) Arnaud Souquet | DF | MLS Player Pool | Contract was bought out | |
| August 25, 2025 | (Colombia) Carlos Terán | DF | (Brazil) Club Athletico Paranaense | Sold to Club Athletico Paranaense for an undisclosed amount | |

=== Loaned Out ===
| Date | Player | Position | Destination Club | Notes | Ref |
|---|---|---|---|---|---|
| December 13, 2024 | (Greece) Georgios Koutsias | FW | (Switzerland) FC Lugano | Loaned to Lugano for the duration of the 2025 MLS season with an option for a permanent transfer | |
| March 3, 2025 | (United States) Bryan Dowd | GK | (United States) FC Tulsa | Loaned for the 2025 USL Championship season, though the loan would be cancelled just two months later | |
| May 20, 2025 | (United States) Bryan Dowd | GK | (United States) Chicago Fire FC II | Loaned to the Fire's second team for the remainder of the season after being called back to the Fire from Tulsa | |
| August 7, 2025 | (Guyana) Omari Glasgow | MF/FW | (United States) Loudoun United FC | Loaned through the remainder of the season | |
| August 26, 2025 | (United States) Dean Boltz | FW | (United States) Forward Madison FC | Loaned for the remainder of the season | |

=== Unsigned draft picks ===
| | Player | Position | Previous club | Notes | Ref |
|---|---|---|---|---|---|
| R2, P3 | (United States) Travis Smith Jr | D | Wake Forest | Did not join the Fire in preseason | |
| R3, P3 | (South Africa) Geni Kanyane | D | University of Dayton | Did not join the Fire in preseason, joined the second team | |

Additionally, the Fire brought several academy and Fire II players into preseason camp- goalkeeper Patrick Los, defenders Christopher Cupps, Diego Konincks, and Josue Pfrommer, midfielders Harold Osorio and Sam Williams, and forwards Claudio Cassano and Vitaly Hilyut.

== Technical staff ==
| Position | Staff |
|---|---|
| Head Coach and Director of Football | (United States) Gregg Berhalter |
| Assistant Coach | (Portugal) Filipe Çelikkaya |
| Assistant Coach | (United States) Tom Heinemann |
| Assistant Coach | (United States) Hector Jiménez |
| Goalkeeping Coach | (United States) Zach Thornton |
| Assistant Goalkeeping Coach | (United States) Joe Bendik |
| Set Piece Coach | (England) Ryan Needs |
| Sporting Director | (England) Gregg Broughton |
| Head of Player Recruitment | (United States) Michael Stephens |
| Director of Performance | (Canada) Darcy Norman |
| Head of Strategy | (United States) Eddie Rock |
| General Manager | (United States) Zayne Thomajan |
| Director of Methodology; Talent Manager | (Switzerland) Vincent Cavin |

Last updated: January 8, 2025
Source: Chicago Fire Technical Staff

== Competitions ==
=== Major League Soccer ===
==== Eastern Conference table ====
MLS Eastern Conference table (2025)
| Pos | Team | Pld | W | L | T | GF | GA | GD | Pts | Qualification |
|---|---|---|---|---|---|---|---|---|---|---|
| 1 | Philadelphia Union | 34 | 20 | 8 | 6 | 57 | 35 | +22 | 66 | Qualification for round one and the CONCACAF Champions Cup round one |
| 2 | FC Cincinnati | 34 | 20 | 9 | 5 | 52 | 40 | +12 | 65 | Qualification for round one |
| 3 | Inter Miami CF (C) | 34 | 19 | 7 | 8 | 81 | 55 | +26 | 65 | Qualification for round one |
| 4 | Charlotte FC | 34 | 19 | 13 | 2 | 55 | 46 | +9 | 59 | Qualification for round one |
| 5 | New York City FC | 34 | 17 | 12 | 5 | 50 | 44 | +6 | 56 | Qualification for round one |
| 6 | Nashville SC | 34 | 16 | 12 | 6 | 58 | 45 | +13 | 54 | Qualification for round one |
| 7 | Columbus Crew | 34 | 14 | 8 | 12 | 55 | 51 | +4 | 54 | Qualification for round one |
| 8 | Chicago Fire FC | 34 | 15 | 11 | 8 | 68 | 60 | +8 | 53 | Qualification for the wild-card round |
| 9 | Orlando City SC | 34 | 14 | 9 | 11 | 63 | 51 | +12 | 53 | Qualification for the wild-card round |
| 10 | New York Red Bulls | 34 | 12 | 15 | 7 | 48 | 47 | +1 | 43 | |
| 11 | New England Revolution | 34 | 9 | 16 | 9 | 44 | 51 | −7 | 36 | |
| 12 | Toronto FC | 34 | 6 | 14 | 14 | 37 | 44 | −7 | 32 | |
| 13 | CF Montréal | 34 | 6 | 18 | 10 | 34 | 60 | −26 | 28 | |
| 14 | Atlanta United FC | 34 | 5 | 16 | 13 | 38 | 63 | −25 | 28 | |
| 15 | D.C. United | 34 | 5 | 18 | 11 | 30 | 66 | −36 | 26 | |

Source: MLS
Rules for classification: 1) points; 2) total wins; 3) total goal differential; 4) total goals scored; 5) fewer disciplinary points; 6) away goal differential; 7) away goals scored; 8) home goals differential; 9) home goals scored; 10) coin toss (2 clubs tied) or drawing of lots (≥3 clubs tied)
(C) Conference champion

==== Overall table ====
Overall MLS standings table (2025)
| Pos | Team | Pld | W | L | T | GF | GA | GD | Pts | Qualification |
|---|---|---|---|---|---|---|---|---|---|---|
| 11 | Nashville SC (U) | 34 | 16 | 12 | 6 | 58 | 45 | +13 | 54 | Qualification for the CONCACAF Champions Cup Round one (Note: As winners of 2025 U.S. Open Cup) |
| 12 | Columbus Crew | 34 | 14 | 8 | 12 | 55 | 51 | +4 | 54 | |
| 13 | Chicago Fire FC | 34 | 15 | 11 | 8 | 68 | 60 | +8 | 53 | |
| 14 | Orlando City SC | 34 | 14 | 9 | 11 | 63 | 51 | +12 | 53 | |
| 15 | Austin FC | 34 | 13 | 13 | 8 | 37 | 45 | −8 | 47 | |

Source: MLS
Rules for classification: 1) points; 2) total wins; 3) total goal differential; 4) total goals scored; 5) fewer disciplinary points; 6) away goal differential; 7) away goals scored; 8) home goals differential; 9) home goals scored; 10) coin toss (2 clubs tied) or drawing of lots (≥3 clubs tied)
(U) U.S. Open Cup winners

==== Results summary ====
| Overall | | | | | | | | Home | | | | | | Away | | | | | |
| Pld | Pts | W | L | T | GF | GA | GD | W | L | T | GF | GA | GD | W | L | T | GF | GA | GD |
|---|---|---|---|---|---|---|---|---|---|---|---|---|---|---|---|---|---|---|---|
| 34 | 53 | 15 | 11 | 8 | 68 | 60 | +8 | 6 | 5 | 6 | 25 | 25 | 0 | 9 | 6 | 2 | 43 | 35 | +8 |

Last updated: October 18
Source: MLSsoccer.com standings
Pld = Matches played; Pts = Points; W = Matches won; T = Matches tied; L = Matches lost; GF = Goals for; GA = Goals against; GD = Goal difference

==== Match results ====
===== Preseason =====
| January 19 Orlando Cup | Chicago Fire FC | 0–1 | (Brazil) Fortaleza | Davie, Florida |
| | (yellow card) 21' Terán | | 67' Moisés | Stadium: Beyond Bancard Field |

| January 25 Friendly | Chicago Fire FC | 2–0 | Sporting Kansas City | Palm Beach Gardens, Florida |
| | 17' Zinckernagel; 74' Oregel | | | Stadium: The Gardens North County District Park |

| February 5 CVI | Chicago Fire FC | 0–1 | Los Angeles FC | Indio, California |
| | | | 65' (pen.) Bouanga | Stadium: Empire Polo Club |

| February 8 CVI | Portland Timbers | 0–0 | Chicago Fire FC | Indio, California |
| | K. Miller (yellow card) 8'; Paredes (yellow card) 30'; Župarić (yellow card) 58'; Chará (yellow card) 65' | Report | Acosta (yellow card) 26' | Stadium: Empire Polo Club |

| February 12 CVI | Chicago Fire FC | 5–1 | San Jose Earthquakes | Indio, California |
| | Bamba 5' (pen.), 34'; Gutiérrez 13', 26' (pen.); Zinckernagel 16'; Acosta (yellow card) 18' | Report | Wilson (yellow card) 27'; Arango 56'; Rodrigues (yellow card) 81' | Stadium: Empire Polo Club |

| February 15 CVI | LA Galaxy | 0–1 | Chicago Fire FC | Indio, California |
| | (yellow card) 53' Garcés | | 22' Gutiérrez; (yellow card) 62' Bamba | Stadium: Empire Polo Club |

===== Regular season =====
| February 22 1 | Columbus Crew | 4–2 | Chicago Fire FC | Columbus, Ohio |
| 6:30 PM | 20' Russell-Rowe; 38' (o.g.) Terán; 45+1', 50' Rossi | Report | 13', 22', (yellow card) 59' Gutiérrez; (yellow card) 37' Oregel; (yellow card) 44' Zinckernagel | Stadium: Lower.com Field; Attendance: 20,210; Referee: Fotis Bazakos |

| March 1 2 | Chicago Fire FC | 2–2 | D.C. United | Chicago, Illinois |
| 7:30 PM | 30', 71' Cuypers; (yellow card) 90' Rogers | Report | 4' Benteke; (yellow card) 42' Rowles; (yellow card) 50' Herrera; (yellow card) 90+3' Schnegg; 90+6' Murrell | Stadium: Soldier Field; Attendance: 20,372; Referee: Marcos de Olivera |

| March 8 3 | FC Dallas | 1–3 | Chicago Fire FC | Frisco, Texas |
| 7:30 PM | 57' Farrington | Report | (yellow card) 45+1' Pineda; (yellow card) 71' Gutiérrez; 82' Gutman; 84' Barroso; (yellow card) 88', (goal) 90+1' (pen.) Cuypers | Stadium: Toyota Stadium; Attendance: 11,004; Referee: Sergii Demianchuk |

| March 15 4 | Toronto FC | 1–2 | Chicago Fire FC | Toronto, Ontario |
| 1:30 PM | 11' Kerr | Report | 30' Gutman; 44' Cuypers | Stadium: BMO Field; Attendance: 22,738; Referee: Allan Chapman |

| March 22 5 | Vancouver Whitecaps FC | 1–3 | Chicago Fire FC | Vancouver, British Columbia |
| 9:30 PM | 14' Ríos; (yellow card) 71' Badwal | Report | 1' Cuypers; (yellow card) 43' Gutman; 62' Zinckernagel; (yellow card) 69' Elliott; 90+5' Kouamé | Stadium: BC Place; Attendance: 18,717; Referee: Malik Badawi |

| March 29 6 | Chicago Fire FC | 1–1 | CF Montréal | Chicago, Illinois |
| 7:30 PM | 40', (yellow card) 53' Zinckernagel; (yellow card) 47' Gutman | Report | (yellow card) 23' Loturi; 51' Sealy | Stadium: Soldier Field; Attendance: 16,278; Referee: Elijio Arreguin |

| April 5 7 | New York Red Bulls | 2–1 | Chicago Fire FC | Harrison, New Jersey |
| 6:30 PM | 41' Ngoma; 45+2' (pen.) Choupo-Moting | Report | 32' Bamba | Stadium: Sports Illustrated Stadium; Attendance: 17,238; Referee: Jair Marrufo |

| April 13 8 | Chicago Fire FC | 0–0 | Inter Miami CF | Chicago, Illinois |
| 3:30 PM | (yellow card) 3' Pineda; (yellow card) 36' Gutiérrez; (yellow card) 62' Elliott; (yellow card) 76' Oregel; (yellow card) 84' Terán | Report | (yellow card) 20' Redondo; (yellow card) 23' Suárez; (yellow card) 38' Cremaschi | Stadium: Soldier Field; Attendance: 62,358; Referee: Jon Freemon |

| April 19 9 | Chicago Fire FC | 2–3 | FC Cincinnati | Chicago, Illinois |
| 7:30 PM | 31' Cuypers; 85' (pen.) Gutiérrez; (yellow card) 88' Acosta | Report | 9', 71' Evander; 42', (yellow card) 43' Denkey; (yellow card) 90+5' Celentano; (yellow card) 90+6' Orellano | Stadium: Soldier Field; Attendance: 17,732; Referee: Lorenzo Hernandez |

| April 26 10 | Nashville SC | 7–2 | Chicago Fire FC | Nashville, Tennessee |
| 7:30 PM | 15' (pen.), 45+9' (pen.), 50', 57' Surridge; 23' Palacios; 25', 31' Mukhtar | Report | (yellow card) 43' D’Avilla; (yellow card) 45+7' Brady; (yellow card) 51', (goal) 63' Zinckernagel; (yellow card) 65' Elliott; 71' Cuypers | Stadium: Geodis Park; Attendance: 24,771; Referee: Rosendo Mendoza |

| May 3 11 | Chicago Fire FC | 0–0 | Orlando City SC | Chicago, Illinois |
| 7:30 PM | (yellow card) 27' Oregel; (red card) 36' Brady; (yellow card) 45' Gutiérrez; (yellow card) 70' Gutman | Report | (yellow card) 90' Þórhallsson | Stadium: Soldier Field; Attendance: 17,876; Referee: Victor Rivas |

| May 10 12 | Chicago Fire FC | 2–1 | Atlanta United FC | Chicago, Illinois |
| 1:30 PM | 14' (pen.) Cuypers; (yellow card) 60' Pineda; (yellow card) 73' Rogers; 86' Kouamé | Report | (yellow card) 35' Fortune; (yellow card) 45+5' Miranchuk; (yellow card) 60' Latte Lath; 81' (o.g.) Rogers | Stadium: Soldier Field; Attendance: 22,741; Referee: Lukasz Szpala |

| May 17 13 | Charlotte FC | 1–4 | Chicago Fire FC | Charlotte, North Carolina |
| 6:30 PM | 70' Agyemang; (yellow card) 77' Westwood; (yellow card) 90+7' Biel | Report | (yellow card) 8' Rogers; (yellow card) 24' Pineda; 42' Bamba; 60', 79' (pen.) Gutiérrez; 64' Zinckernagel | Stadium: Bank of America Stadium; Attendance: 29,755; Referee: Ismir Pekmic |

| May 25 14 | New York City FC | 3–1 | Chicago Fire FC | New York, New York |
| 4:00 PM | (yellow card) 14' Haak; (yellow card) 28' Moralez; (yellow card) 45+3' Gray; (yellow card) 56' Martins; 58' Bakrar; 70' Wolf; 89' (pen.) Martínez | Report | 19' Zinckernagel; (red card) 32' Gutiérrez; (yellow card) 45+1' Dean; (yellow card) 60, 84' (yellow-red card) D'Avilla | Stadium: Yankee Stadium; Attendance: 18,524; Referee: Rosendo Mendoza |

| May 31 15 | Orlando City SC | 1–3 | Chicago Fire FC | Orlando, Florida |
| 6:30 PM | 40' Freeman; (yellow card) 45' Jansson; (yellow card) 49' Schlegel | Report | 6' Zinckernagel; (yellow card) 22' Cupps; (yellow card) 28' Pineda; 31', 32' Cuypers | Stadium: Inter&Co Stadium; Attendance: 21,024; Referee: Ricardo Fierro |

| June 7 16 | D.C. United | 1–7 | Chicago Fire FC | Washington, D.C. |
| 6:30 PM | (yellow card) 8' Tubbs; 60' Badji | Report | 8' Haile-Selassie; 24', (yellow card) 45+1' Bamba; 30', 44', 65' Barlow; 56', (yellow card) 85' Zinckernagel; (yellow card) 72' Acosta; 90+1' Gutiérrez | Stadium: Audi Field; Attendance: 16,715; Referee: Lorenzo Hernandez |

| June 14 17 | Chicago Fire FC | 0–2 | Nashville SC | Chicago, Illinois |
| 7:30 PM | (yellow card) 44' Oregel; (yellow card) 63' Gonzalez | Report | (yellow card) 37' Maher; 56' Mukhtar; (yellow card) 65' Brugman; 75' Surridge; (yellow card) 90' Pérez; (yellow card) 90+3' Tagseth; (yellow card) 90+4' Willis | Stadium: Soldier Field; Attendance: 26,942; Referee: Alexis Da Silva |

| June 25 18 | Chicago Fire FC | 0–1 | Philadelphia Union | Chicago, Illinois |
| 7:30 PM | (yellow card) 81' Gonzalez | Report | 9' (pen.) Damiani; (yellow card) 35' Lukić; (yellow card) 50' Glesnes; (yellow card) 72' Bueno; (yellow card) 90' Makyanhya; (yellow card) 90+2' Bedoya | Stadium: Soldier Field; Attendance: 17,231; Referee: Greg Dopka |

| June 28 19 | Chicago Fire FC | 3–2 | Charlotte FC | Chicago, Illinois |
| 7:30 PM | 23' Zinckernagel; 25' Gutiérrez; 33' Cuypers; (yellow card) 50' Haile-Selassie; (yellow card) 77' Dean; (yellow card) 80' Gutman; (yellow card) 82' Rogers; (yellow card) 88' Oregel | Report | 56', (yellow card) 79' Biel; 59' Toklomati; (yellow card) 60' Zaha | Stadium: Soldier Field; Attendance: 17,837; Referee: Sergii Boiko |

| July 5 20 | FC Cincinnati | 2–1 | Chicago Fire FC | Cincinnati, Ohio |
| 6:30 PM | 19' Evander; 50' Denkey; (yellow card) 53' Kamara; (yellow card) 83' Miazga | Report | 55' Zinckernagel; (yellow card) 76' Bamba; (yellow card) 90+7' Elliott | Stadium: TQL Stadium; Attendance: 25,513; Referee: Pierre-Luc Lauziere |

| July 12 21 | Chicago Fire FC | 1–2 | San Diego FC | Chicago, Illinois |
| 7:30 PM | (yellow card) 30' Pineda; 87' Cuypers; (yellow card) 90+6' Gutiérrez | Report | (yellow card) 2' Valakari; 8', 48' Dreyer; (yellow card) 82' Boateng | Stadium: Soldier Field; Attendance: 27,631; Referee: Victor Rivas |

| July 16 22 | Atlanta United FC | 2–2 | Chicago Fire FC | Atlanta, Georgia |
| 6:30 PM | (yellow card) 31' Amador; 59' Miranchuk; (yellow card) 83' Slisz; 90+4' Reilly | Report | 2' Zinckernagel; (yellow card) 28' Oregel; (yellow card) 35' D'Avilla; 79' Haile-Selassie | Stadium: Mercedes-Benz Stadium; Attendance: 38,882; Referee: Sergii Demianchuk |

| July 19 23 | CF Montréal | 0–2 | Chicago Fire FC | Montreal, Quebec |
| 6:30 | (yellow card) 27' Herbers; (yellow card) 57' Pearce; (yellow card) 71' Waterman; (yellow card) 73' Donadel (coach); (yellow card) 87' Loturi | Report | 13' Cuypers; (yellow card) 32' Pineda; (yellow card) 36' Rogers; 54' Elliott; (yellow card) 66' Kouamé | Stadium: Saputo Stadium; Attendance: 16,218; Referee: Jon Freemon |

| July 26 24 | Chicago Fire FC | 1–0 | New York Red Bulls | Chicago, Illinois |
| 7:30 PM | 44' (pen.) Cuypers | Report | (yellow card) 89' Forsberg | Stadium: Soldier Field; Attendance: 29,273; Referee: Allen Chapman |

| August 9 25 | Chicago Fire FC | 2–2 | Los Angeles FC | Bridgeview, Illinois |
| 7:30 PM | 11', (yellow card) 80' Terán; (yellow card) 24' Gutiérrez; (yellow card) 62' Zinckernagel; 70' Bamba; (yellow card) 80' Brady | Report | 19' Hollingshead; (yellow card) 64' Tafari; (yellow card) 72' Segura; 81' (pen.) Bouanga | Stadium: SeatGeek Stadium; Attendance: 19,831; Referee: Ricardo Montero |

| August 16 26 | Chicago Fire FC | 3–2 | St. Louis City SC | Bridgeview, Illinois |
| 7:30 PM | 16' Cuypers; 67' Zinckernagel; 87' Gutiérrez | Report | (yellow card) 36', (goal) 59' Hartel; 47', (yellow card) 61' Ostrák; (yellow card) 90+1' Löwen; (yellow card) 90+3' Bürki | Stadium: SeatGeek Stadium; Attendance: 17,485; Referee: Jair Marrufo |
Note: Match was delayed by over an hour and a half due to weather in the area

| August 23 27 | Philadelphia Union | 4–0 | Chicago Fire FC | Chester, Pennsylvania |
| 6:30 PM | 34', (yellow card) 59' Baribo; (yellow card) 37' Lukić; 64' Wagner; (yellow card) 66' Makhanya; 73' Jean Jacques; 80' Iloski | Report | (yellow card) 38' Barroso; (yellow card) 57' Oregel | Stadium: Subaru Park; Attendance: 18,712; Referee: Rubiel Vazquez |

| September 6 28 | Chicago Fire FC | 3–2 | New England Revolution | Bridgeview, Illinois |
| 7:30 PM | 2' Bamba; 10' Zinckernagel; 68' Cuypers; (yellow card) 72' Brady; (yellow card) 90+3' Gonzalez | Report | 78' Miller; (yellow card) 81' Ceballos; 90+4' (pen.) Gil | Stadium: SeatGeek Stadium; Attendance: 16,947; Referee: Guido Gonzales Jr. |

| September 13 29 | Chicago Fire FC | 1–3 | New York City FC | Chicago, Illinois |
| 7:30 PM | 13' Zinckernagel | Report | (yellow card) 37' O'Neill; 40' Fernández; 57' Martínez; 90+3' Reid | Stadium: Soldier Field; Attendance: 20,636; Referee: Pierre-Luc Lauziere |

| September 20 30 | Minnesota United FC | 0–3 | Chicago Fire FC | Saint Paul, Minnesota |
| 7:30 PM | (yellow card) 40' Trapp; (yellow card) 59' Duggan; (yellow card) 87' Romero | Report | 26' Waterman; 41' D'Avilla; 70' Zinckernagel; (yellow card) 87' Elliott | Stadium: Allianz Field; Attendance: 19,693; Referee: Marcos de Oliveira |

| September 27 31 | Chicago Fire FC | 2–0 | Columbus Crew | Chicago, Illinois |
| 7:30 PM | 25' Gutman; 70' Cuypers; (yellow card) 90+4' Rogers | Report | (yellow card) 66' Aliyu | Stadium: Soldier Field; Attendance: 23,321; Referee: Tori Penso |

| September 30 32 | Inter Miami CF | 3–5 | Chicago Fire FC | Fort Lauderdale, Florida |
| 6:30 | 39', (yellow card) 45+3' Avilés; 57', 74' Suárez; (yellow card) 68' Busquets; (yellow card) 68' Rodríguez; (yellow card) 78' Bright | Report | 11' D'Avilla; 31' Dean; (yellow card) 32' Bamba; 43' Kouamé; (yellow card) 69' Franco; 80' Reynolds; 83' Gutiérrez; (yellow card) 86' Elliott | Stadium: Chase Stadium; Attendance: 19,766; Referee: Allen Chapman |
Note: Match was rescheduled from August 30 due to Inter Miami CF making it to the semifinals of the Leagues Cup.

| October 4 33 | Chicago Fire FC | 2–2 | Toronto FC | Chicago, Illinois |
| 7:30 PM | (yellow card) 21' Zinckernagel; 71', 89' Elliott; (yellow card) 90+11' Waterman | Report | 28' (o.g.) Elliott; (yellow card) 74' Laryea; (yellow card) 90', (goal) 90+10' Mihailovic | Stadium: Soldier Field; Attendance: 24,653; Referee: Timothy Ford |

| October 18 34 | New England Revolution | 2–2 | Chicago Fire FC | Foxborough, Massachusetts |
| 5:00 PM | 1' Yusuf; (yellow card) 68', (goal) 90+6' Turgeman; (yellow card) 90+9' Langoni | Report | 82' Zinckernagel; 90+9' (o.g.) Turgeman; (yellow card) 90+12' Elliott | Stadium: Gillette Stadium; Referee: Pierre-Luc Lauziere |

=== MLS Cup playoffs ===
==== Wild Card ====
| October 22 Wild Card | Chicago Fire FC | 3–1 | Orlando City SC | Bridgeview, Illinois |
| 7:30 pm CDT | (yellow card) 45' Gutman; 48' Gutiérrez; 57', 68' Cuypers | Report | (yellow card) 58' Atuesta; (yellow card) 74' Schlegel; 89' Spicer; (yellow card) 90' Brekalo | Stadium: SeatGeek Stadium; Attendance: 13,783; Referee: Drew Fischer |

==== Round One ====
| October 26 Round One | Philadelphia Union | 2–2 (4–2 p) | Chicago Fire FC | Chester, Pennsylvania |
| 4:30 pm CDT | 70' Vassilev; (yellow card) 74' Lukić; 75' Iloski; (yellow card) 90+1' Glesnes; (yellow card) 90+5' Wagner | Report | (yellow card) 67' Waterman; 84' Bamba; (yellow card) 89', (goal) 90+3' Elliott; (red card) 90+4' Oregel; (yellow card) 90+5' Gutiérrez | Stadium: Subaru Park; Attendance: 19,019; Referee: Sergei Boiko |
| | Penalties |
| | Uhre (penalty missed); Westfield (penalty scored); Iloski (penalty scored); Baribo (penalty scored); Bueno (penalty scored) | | (penalty missed) Elliott; (penalty scored) Gutiérrez; (penalty scored) Cuypers; (penalty missed) Waterman |

| November 1 Round One | Chicago Fire FC | 0–3 | Philadelphia Union | Bridgeview, Illinois |
| 4:30 pm CDT | (yellow card) 19' Bamba; (yellow card) 63' D'Avilla; (yellow card) 69' Haile-Selassie | Report | 8', 16' Baribo; (yellow card) 31' Danley; 35' Damiani; (yellow card) 40' Iloski | Stadium: SeatGeek Stadium; Attendance: 17,431; Referee: Jon Freemon |
Note: Philadelphia Union won the series 2–0.

=== U.S. Open Cup ===
| May 7 Round of 32 | Chicago Fire FC (Illinois) | 4–0 | (Michigan) Detroit City FC | Bridgeview, Illinois |
| 7:00 PM | 4' Cuypers; 35' (o.g.) Smith; 50' Glasgow; 71' Haile-Selassie | Report | (yellow card) 41' Ryan Williams; (yellow card) 70' Rhys Williams | Stadium: SeatGeek Stadium; Attendance: 4,374; Referee: Matthew Thompson |

| May 20 Round of 16 | New England Revolution (Massachusetts) | 1–3 | (Illinois) Chicago Fire FC | Providence, Rhode Island |
| 6:30 PM | (yellow card) 67' Omsberg; 89' (o.g.) Reynolds; (yellow card) 90+4' Klein | Report | (yellow card) 9' D'Avilla; 39' (o.g.) Klein; 69' Cuypers; (yellow card) 76' Glasgow; 79' Zinckernagel | Stadium: Chapey Field at Anderson Stadium; Referee: Greg Dopka |

| July 8 Quarterfinal | Minnesota United FC | 3–1 (a.e.t.) | (Illinois) Chicago Fire FC | Saint Paul, Minnesota |
| 7:00 PM | (yellow card) 27' Trapp; (yellow card) 35' Harvey; 47' Lod; (yellow card) 51' Rosales; 95', 120' (pen.) Kelvin Yeboah; (yellow card) 107' Hlongwane | Report | (red card) 25' Gonzalez; 28' (pen.) Gutiérrez; (yellow card) 37' Elliott; (yellow card) 114' Cuypers; (yellow card) 118' Barroso; (yellow card) 120' Brady | Stadium: Allianz Field; Referee: Ekaterina Koroleva |

=== Leagues Cup ===
Chicago Fire FC did not qualify for the 2025 Leagues Cup as they were not one of the top 9 teams in the Eastern Conference for the 2024 season.

== Statistics ==
Note: italics indicates a player who left during the season while * indicates a Fire II player that joined on a short-term loan or for the Open Cup

=== Games played ===
| No. | Name | MLS | | | | Playoffs | | | | Open Cup | | | | Total | | | |
| No. | Name | Starts | Apps | Minutes | Bench | Starts | Apps | Minutes | Bench | Starts | Apps | Minutes | Bench | Starts | Apps | Minutes | Bench |
|---|---|---|---|---|---|---|---|---|---|---|---|---|---|---|---|---|---|
| 1 | Chris Brady | 28 | 28 | 2376 | | 2 | 2 | 180 | | 3 | 3 | 300 | | 33 | 33 | 2856 | |
| 2 | Leonardo Barroso | 11 | 19 | 1044 | 1 | | | | | | 1 | 48 | | 11 | 20 | 1092 | 1 |
| 3 | Jack Elliott | 33 | 33 | 2849 | | 3 | 3 | 270 | | 3 | 3 | 255 | | 39 | 39 | 3374 | |
| 4 | Carlos Terán | 7 | 8 | 536 | 1 | | | | | | | | | 7 | 8 | 536 | 1 |
| 5 | Sam Rogers | 20 | 22 | 1706 | 6 | 1 | 1 | 90 | 2 | 1 | 2 | 180 | | 22 | 25 | 1976 | 8 |
| 6 | Rominigue Kouamé | 5 | 17 | 559 | 1 | 2 | 3 | 108 | | 2 | 2 | 157 | | 9 | 22 | 824 | 1 |
| 7 | Maren Haile-Selassie | 5 | 30 | 830 | 1 | 1 | 3 | 144 | | 3 | 3 | 210 | | 9 | 36 | 1184 | 1 |
| 8 | Chris Mueller | | | | | | | | | | | | | | | | |
| 9 | Hugo Cuypers | 33 | 33 | 2814 | | 3 | 3 | 270 | | 2 | 3 | 198 | | 38 | 39 | 3292 | |
| 10 | André Franco | 5 | 6 | 404 | | | | | | | | | | 5 | 6 | 404 | |
| 11 | Philip Zinckernagel | 31 | 32 | 2446 | | 2 | 2 | 180 | | 1 | 2 | 92 | | 34 | 36 | 2738 | |
| 12 | Tom Barlow | 1 | 22 | 359 | 12 | | 2 | 26 | 1 | 1 | 3 | 102 | | 2 | 25 | 462 | 13 |
| 14 | Viktor Radojević | | | | | | | | | | | | | | | | |
| 15 | Andrew Gutman | 34 | 34 | 2780 | | 3 | 3 | 270 | | 3 | 3 | 247 | | 40 | 40 | 3297 | |
| 16 | Joel Waterman | 6 | 6 | 441 | | 3 | 3 | 270 | | | | | | 9 | 9 | 711 | |
| 17 | Brian Gutiérrez | 24 | 29 | 2051 | | 2 | 3 | 193 | | 1 | 3 | 137 | | 27 | 35 | 2381 | |
| 19 | Jonathan Bamba | 32 | 34 | 2470 | | 3 | 3 | 261 | | 2 | 3 | 147 | | 37 | 40 | 2878 | |
| 22 | Mauricio Pineda | 18 | 28 | 1518 | 4 | | 2 | 86 | 1 | | 1 | 48 | 1 | 18 | 31 | 1652 | 5 |
| 23 | Kellyn Acosta | 6 | 19 | 647 | 10 | | 1 | 4 | 2 | 2 | 2 | 180 | | 8 | 22 | 831 | 12 |
| 24 | Jonathan Dean | 18 | 29 | 1661 | 1 | 3 | 3 | 224 | | 1 | 2 | 165 | | 22 | 34 | 2050 | 1 |
| 25 | Jeff Gal | 6 | 7 | 590 | 27 | 1 | 1 | 90 | 2 | | | | 3 | 7 | 8 | 680 | 32 |
| 26 | Omari Glasgow | 4 | 14 | 522 | 8 | | | | | 2 | 2 | 180 | | 6 | 16 | 702 | 8 |
| 27 | Dylan Borso | | | | 2 | | | | | | | | | | | | 2 |
| 28 | Dean Boltz | | | | | | | | | | | | | | | | |
| 29 | David Poreba | | | | | | | | | | | | | | | | |
| 31 | Bryan Dowd | | | | 6 | | | | 1 | | | | | | | | 7 |
| 34 | Omar Gonzalez | 3 | 12 | 420 | 18 | | | | 3 | 1 | 3 | 70 | | 4 | 15 | 490 | 21 |
| 35 | Sergio Oregel | 25 | 28 | 2041 | 4 | 1 | 2 | 97 | | | 2 | 76 | 1 | 26 | 32 | 2214 | 4 |
| 36 | Justin Reynolds | 1 | 4 | 145 | 11 | | | | 3 | | 1 | 8 | | 1 | 5 | 153 | 14 |
| 37 | Robert Turdean | | | | | | | | | | | | | | | | |
| 38 | Christopher Cupps | 3 | 4 | 284 | 10 | | | | | 1 | 1 | 90 | | 4 | 5 | 374 | 10 |
| 42 | Djé D'Avilla | 11 | 21 | 1168 | 5 | 3 | 3 | 223 | | 3 | 3 | 243 | | 17 | 27 | 1634 | 5 |
| 44 | Jason Shokalook* | | 1 | 14 | 1 | | | | | | | | | | 1 | 14 | 1 |
| 45 | Harold Osorio* | | 1 | 1 | 3 | | | | | | | | | | 1 | 1 | 3 |
| 47 | Sam Williams | 3 | 7 | 314 | 10 | | | | 1 | 1 | 1 | 72 | | 4 | 8 | 386 | 11 |
| 48 | Richard Fleming III* | | | | 1 | | | | | | | | | | | | 1 |
| 68 | Vitaliy Hlyut* | | | | 2 | | | | | | | | | | | | 2 |
| 77 | Chase Gasper | | | | 2 | | | | | | | | | | | | 2 |
| | Diego Konincks* | | | | 2 | | | | | | | | | | | | 2 |

=== Goalkeeping ===
| No. | Nat. | Name | MLS | | | Playoffs | | | Open Cup | | | Total | | |
| No. | Nat. | Name | Clean Sheets | Saves | GA | Clean Sheets | Saves | GA | Clean Sheets | Saves | GA | Clean Sheets | Saves | GA |
|---|---|---|---|---|---|---|---|---|---|---|---|---|---|---|
| 1 | USA | Chris Brady | 6 | 93 | 51 | | 3 | 3 | 1 | 12 | 4 | 7 | 108 | 58 |
| 25 | USA | Jeff Gal | 1 | 10 | 9 | | | 3 | | | | 1 | 10 | 12 |
| 31 | USA | Bryan Dowd | | | | | | | | | | | | |

=== Goals ===
| Rk. | Player | MLS | Playoffs | Open Cup | Total |
| Rk. | Player | Goal | Goal | Goal | Goal |
|---|---|---|---|---|---|
| 1 | (Belgium) Hugo Cuypers | 17 | 2 | 2 | 21 |
| 2 | (Denmark) Philip Zinckernagel | 15 | 0 | 1 | 16 |
| 3 | (United States) Brian Gutiérrez | 9 | 1 | 1 | 11 |
| 4 | (Ivory Coast) Jonathan Bamba | 5 | 1 | 0 | 6 |
| 5 | (England) Jack Elliott | 4 | 1 | 0 | 4 |
| 6 | (United States) Tom Barlow | 3 | 0 | 0 | 3 |
| 6 | (United States) Andrew Gutman | 3 | 0 | 0 | 3 |
| 6 | (Switzerland) Maren Haile-Selassie | 2 | 0 | 1 | 3 |
| 6 | (Mali) Rominigue Kouamé | 3 | 0 | 0 | 3 |
| 10 | (Ivory Coast) Djé D'Avilla | 2 | 0 | 0 | 2 |
| 11 | (Portugal) Leonardo Barroso | 1 | 0 | 0 | 1 |
| 11 | (United States) Jonathan Dean | 1 | 0 | 0 | 1 |
| 11 | (Guyana) Omari Glasgow | 0 | 0 | 1 | 1 |
| 11 | (United States) Justin Reynolds | 1 | 0 | 0 | 1 |
| 11 | (Colombia) Carlos Terán | 1 | 0 | 0 | 1 |
| 11 | (Canada) Joel Waterman | 1 | 0 | 0 | 1 |

=== Assists ===
| Rk. | Player | MLS | Playoffs | Open Cup | Total |
| Rk. | Player | A | A | A | A |
|---|---|---|---|---|---|
| 1 | (Denmark) Philip Zinckernagel | 15 | 2 | 0 | 15 |
| 2 | (Ivory Coast) Jonathan Bamba | 10 | 2 | 2 | 14 |
| 3 | (United States) Andrew Gutman | 10 | 1 | 0 | 11 |
| 4 | (Switzerland) Maren Haile-Selassie | 8 | 0 | 2 | 10 |
| 5 | (United States) Brian Gutiérrez | 6 | 0 | 1 | 7 |
| 6 | (United States) Jonathan Dean | 4 | 1 | 0 | 5 |
| 7 | (Belgium) Hugo Cuypers | 3 | 0 | 1 | 4 |
| 7 | (Portugal) André Franco | 4 | 0 | 0 | 4 |
| 9 | (England) Jack Elliott | 3 | 0 | 0 | 3 |
| 9 | (Mali) Rominigue Kouamé | 2 | 0 | 0 | 2 |
| 9 | (United States) Mauricio Pineda | 2 | 0 | 0 | 2 |
| 12 | (Portugal) Leonardo Barroso | 1 | 0 | 0 | 1 |
| 12 | (Ivory Coast) Djé D'Avilla | 1 | 0 | 0 | 1 |
| 12 | (Guyana) Omari Glasgow | 1 | 0 | 0 | 1 |
| 12 | (United States) Sergio Oregel | 1 | 0 | 0 | 1 |
| 12 | (United States) Jason Shokalook | 1 | 0 | 0 | 1 |

=== Disciplinary record ===
| Rk. | Player | MLS | | | Playoffs | | | Open Cup | | | Total | | | Matches Suspended |
| Rk. | Player | Yellow card | Second yellow card | Red card | Yellow card | Second yellow card | Red card | Yellow card | Second yellow card | Red card | Yellow card | Second yellow card | Red card | Matches Suspended |
|---|---|---|---|---|---|---|---|---|---|---|---|---|---|---|
| 1 | (United States) Brian Gutiérrez | 6 | 0 | 1 | 1 | 0 | 0 | 0 | 0 | 0 | 7 | 0 | 1 | March 1 vs DC United; May 31 vs Orlando |
| 1 | (United States) Sergio Oregel | 7 | 0 | 0 | 0 | 0 | 1 | 0 | 0 | 0 | 7 | 0 | 1 | July 19 vs Montreal; November 1 vs Philadelphia |
| 3 | (United States) Chris Brady | 3 | 0 | 1 | 0 | 0 | 0 | 1 | 0 | 0 | 4 | 0 | 1 | May 10 vs Atlanta |
| 4 | (United States) Omar Gonzalez | 3 | 0 | 0 | 0 | 0 | 0 | 0 | 0 | 1 | 3 | 0 | 1 | |
| 5 | (England) Jack Elliott | 7 | 0 | 0 | 1 | 0 | 0 | 1 | 0 | 0 | 9 | 0 | 0 | |
| 6 | (United States) Mauricio Pineda | 7 | 0 | 0 | 0 | 0 | 0 | 0 | 0 | 0 | 7 | 0 | 0 | June 8 vs DC |
| 7 | (United States) Sam Rogers | 6 | 0 | 0 | 0 | 0 | 0 | 0 | 0 | 0 | 6 | 0 | 0 | September 30 vs Miami |
| 7 | (Denmark) Philip Zinckernagel | 6 | 0 | 0 | 0 | 0 | 0 | 0 | 0 | 0 | 6 | 0 | 0 | |
| 9 | (Ivory Coast) Djé D'Avilla | 3 | 0 | 0 | 1 | 0 | 0 | 1 | 0 | 0 | 5 | 0 | 0 | ~~May 31 vs Orlando~~ (Note: Following a review by the Independent Review Panel, D'Avilla's second yellow against NYCFC was unanimously rescinded, allowing him to participate in the match against Orlando) |
| 9 | (United States) Andrew Gutman | 4 | 0 | 0 | 1 | 0 | 0 | 0 | 0 | 0 | 5 | 0 | 0 | |
| 11 | (Ivory Coast) Jonathan Bamba | 3 | 0 | 0 | 1 | 0 | 0 | 0 | 0 | 0 | 4 | 0 | 0 | |
| 12 | (United States) Kellyn Acosta | 2 | 0 | 0 | 0 | 0 | 0 | 0 | 0 | 0 | 2 | 0 | 0 | |
| 12 | (United States) Jonathan Dean | 2 | 0 | 0 | 0 | 0 | 0 | 0 | 0 | 0 | 2 | 0 | 0 | |
| 12 | (Colombia) Carlos Terán | 2 | 0 | 0 | 0 | 0 | 0 | 0 | 0 | 0 | 2 | 0 | 0 | |
| 12 | (Canada) Joel Waterman | 1 | 0 | 0 | 1 | 0 | 0 | 0 | 0 | 0 | 2 | 0 | 0 | |
| 16 | (United States) Tom Barlow | 1 | 0 | 0 | 0 | 0 | 0 | 0 | 0 | 0 | 1 | 0 | 0 | |
| 16 | (Portugal) Leonardo Barroso | 1 | 0 | 0 | 0 | 0 | 0 | 0 | 0 | 0 | 1 | 0 | 0 | |
| 16 | (United States) Christopher Cupps | 0 | 0 | 0 | 0 | 0 | 0 | 1 | 0 | 0 | 1 | 0 | 0 | |
| 16 | (Belgium) Hugo Cuypers | 0 | 0 | 0 | 0 | 0 | 0 | 1 | 0 | 0 | 1 | 0 | 0 | |
| 16 | (Portugal) André Franco | 1 | 0 | 0 | 0 | 0 | 0 | 0 | 0 | 0 | 1 | 0 | 0 | |
| 16 | (Guyana) Omari Glasgow | 0 | 0 | 0 | 0 | 0 | 0 | 1 | 0 | 0 | 1 | 0 | 0 | |
| 16 | (Switzerland) Maren Haile-Selassie | 0 | 0 | 0 | 1 | 0 | 0 | 0 | 0 | 0 | 1 | 0 | 0 | |
| 16 | (Mali) Rominigue Kouamé | 1 | 0 | 0 | 0 | 0 | 0 | 0 | 0 | 0 | 1 | 0 | 0 | |

== Awards ==
=== End of Season Awards ===
| Award | Player | Result | Report |
|---|---|---|---|
| Newcomer of the Year | (Denmark) Philip Zinckernagel | 3rd Place | |

=== MLS Team of the Matchday ===
| Matchday | Player | Position | Report |
|---|---|---|---|
| 1 | (United States) Brian Gutiérrez (1) | MF | |
| 2 | (United States) Chris Brady (1) | GK | |
| 2 | (Belgium) Hugo Cuypers (1) | Bench | |
| 3 | (Belgium) Hugo Cuypers (2) | FW | |
| 4 | (United States) Andrew Gutman (1) | DF | |
| 5 | (Denmark) Philip Zinckernagel (1) | FW | |
| 5 | (United States) Gregg Berhalter | Coach | |
| 12 | (Mali) Rominigue Kouamé | Bench | |
| 14 | (United States) Brian Gutiérrez (2) | Midfielder | |
| 14 | (United States) Andrew Gutman (2) | Defender | |
| 17 | (Belgium) Hugo Cuypers (3) | Forward | |
| 17 | (Denmark) Philip Zinckernagel (2) | Bench | |
| 21 | (Denmark) Philip Zinckernagel (3) | Midfield | |
| 25 | (Denmark) Philip Zinckernagel (4) | Bench | |
| 26 | (England) Jack Elliott (1) | Defender | |
| 26 | (United States) Chris Brady (2) | Bench | |
| 27 | (England) Jack Elliott (2) | Defender | |
| 28 | (Denmark) Philip Zinckernagel (5) | Midfielder | |
| 29 | (Denmark) Philip Zinckernagel (6) | Midfielder | |
| 29 | (United States) Brian Gutiérrez (3) | Bench | |
| 35 | (Canada) Joel Waterman | Defender | |
| 37 | (United States) Andrew Gutman (3) | Defender | |
| 38 | (England) Jack Elliott (3) | Defender | |
| 38 | (United States) Chris Brady (3) | Bench | |
| 38 | (Denmark) Philip Zinckernagel (7) | Bench | |
| 39 | (Denmark) Philip Zinckernagel (8) | Bench | |

=== MLS Player of the Matchday ===
| Week | Player | Statistics | Report |
|---|---|---|---|
| 18 | (United States) Tom Barlow | 3 goals vs DC United | |

=== All-Star Game ===
| Player | Selection Type | All-Star Statistics | Report |
|---|---|---|---|
| (Denmark) Philip Zinckernagel | Coach's Selection | 29 minutes, 1 assist | |
