= 2024 Chicago Fire FC season =

Chicago Fire FC
2024 season
- Chairman: Joe Mansueto
- Head coach: Frank Klopas
- Stadium: Soldier Field (capacity: 61,500)
- MLS: Conference: 15th Overall: 28th
- MLS Cup Playoffs: Did not qualify
- Leagues Cup: Group Stage
- Top goalscorer: League: Hugo Cuypers (10); All: Hugo Cuypers (10)
- Highest home attendance: August 31 vs Miami (55,385)
- Lowest home attendance: May 29 vs Orlando City (11,372)
- Average home league attendance: 21,327
- Biggest win: June 15, 4–1 at Toronto
- Biggest defeat: April 20, 0–4 vs Real Salt Lake
Home colors	Away colors

The 2024 Chicago Fire FC season was the club's 26th year of existence, as well as their 27th season in Major League Soccer. This was the fifth and final season for sporting director Georg Heitz, who would leave following the season's conclusion, as well as the final season for head coach Frank Klopas as head coach- both men would be replaced by Gregg Berhalter following the season's conclusion. The Fire ultimately failed to qualify for the playoffs for the seventh season in a row, the longest in team history and longest active streak in MLS.

== Current squad ==
Players signed as of August 15, 2024

No.	Name	Nationality	Position	Date of birth (age)	Previous club	Player Notes
Goalkeepers
18	Spencer Richey	(United States)	G	May 30, 1992 (aged 32)	(United States) Seattle Sounders FC	
25	Jeff Gal	(United States)	G	April 6, 1993 (aged 31)	(Sweden) Degerfors IF	
34	Chris Brady	(United States)	G	March 3, 2004 (aged 20)	(United States) Chicago Fire Academy	Homegrown
78	Bryan Dowd	(United States)	G	May 8, 2002 (aged 22)	(United States) Notre Dame	Loaned Out
Defenders
2	Arnaud Souquet	(France)	D	February 12, 1992 (aged 32)	(France) Montpellier HSC	
4	Carlos Terán	(Colombia)	D	September 24, 2000 (aged 24)	(Colombia) Envigado F.C.	
5	Rafael Czichos	(Germany)	D	May 14, 1990 (aged 34)	(Germany) 1. FC Köln	
14	Tobias Salquist	(Denmark)	D	May 18, 1995 (aged 29)	(Denmark) Silkeborg IF	International
15	Andrew Gutman	(United States)	D	October 2, 1996 (aged 28)	(United States) Colorado Rapids	
16	Wyatt Omsberg	(United States)	D	September 21, 1995 (aged 29)	(United States) Minnesota United FC	
22	Mauricio Pineda	(United States)	D	October 17, 1997 (aged 27)	(United States) North Carolina Tar Heels	
24	Jonathan Dean	(United States)	D	May 15, 1997 (aged 27)	(United States) Birmingham Legion FC	
27	Allan Arigoni	(Switzerland)	D	November 4, 1998 (aged 25)	(Switzerland) FC Lugano	International; Loaned In
36	Justin Reynolds	(United States)	D	April 8, 2004 (aged 20)	(United States) Chicago Fire FC II	Homegrown
77	Chase Gasper	(United States)	D	January 25, 1996 (aged 28)	(United States) Houston Dynamo	
Midfielders
7	Maren Haile-Selassie	(Switzerland)	M	March 13, 1999 (aged 25)	(Switzerland) FC Lugano	International
11	Ariel Lassiter	(Costa Rica)	M	September 27, 1994 (aged 30)	(Canada) CF Montréal	
17	Brian Gutiérrez	(United States)	M	June 17, 2003 (aged 21)	(United States) Chicago Fire Academy	Homegrown; U22 Initiative
21	Fabian Herbers	(Germany)	M	August 17, 1993 (aged 31)	(United States) Philadelphia Union	
23	Kellyn Acosta	(United States)	M	July 24, 1995 (aged 29)	(United States) LAFC	
30	Gastón Giménez	(Paraguay)	M	July 27, 1991 (aged 33)	(Argentina) Vélez Sarsfield	
31	Federico Navarro	(Argentina)	M	March 9, 2000 (aged 24)	(Argentina) Talleres de Cordoba	U22 Initiative
35	Sergio Oregel	(United States)	M	May 16, 2005 (aged 19)	(United States) Chicago Fire Academy	Homegrown
37	Javier Casas	(United States)	M	May 14, 2003 (aged 21)	(United States) Chicago Fire Academy	Homegrown
38	Laurence Wootton	(England)	M	January 10, 2000 (aged 24)	(United States) Ohio State	International; Loaned Out
Forwards
8	Chris Mueller	(United States)	F	August 29, 1996 (aged 28)	(Scotland) Hibernian F.C.	
9	Hugo Cuypers	(Belgium)	F	February 7, 1997 (aged 27)	(Belgium) Gent	International; Designated Player
12	Tom Barlow	(United States)	F	July 8, 1995 (aged 29)	(United States) New York Red Bulls	
19	Georgios Koutsias	(Greece)	F	February 8, 2004 (aged 20)	(Greece) PAOK FC	International; U22 Initiative
32	Missael Rodriguez	(United States)	F	February 9, 2003 (aged 21)	(United States) Chicago Fire Academy	Homegrown; Loaned Out
33	Victor Bezerra	(United States)	F	February 5, 2000 (aged 24)	(United States) Indiana Hoosiers	Homegrown; Loaned Out

== Player movement ==
=== Returning, options, and new contracts ===
Date	Player	Position	Notes	Ref
November 14, 2023	(United States) Brian Gutiérrez	M	Signed to a new Homegrown U22 contract until 2028	
November 22, 2023	(United States) Jonathan Dean	D	Option for 2024 exercised	
November 22, 2023	(United States) Jeffrey Gal	G	Option for 2024 exercised	
November 22, 2023	(Germany) Fabian Herbers	M	Option for 2024 exercised	
November 22, 2023	(United States) Wyatt Omsberg	D	Option for 2024 exercised	
November 22, 2023	(United States) Spencer Richey	G	Option for 2024 exercised	
January 14, 2024	(United States) Javier Casas	M	Re-signed to a contract for 2024 with options for 2025 and 2026 after his contract option expired in 2023	
July 1, 2024	(United States) Justin Reynolds	D	Returned from his loan to FC Lugano	

=== In ===
Date	Player	Position	Previous club	Notes	Ref
November 22, 2023	(Switzerland) Maren Haile-Selassie	M	(Switzerland) FC Lugano	Fire exercised their purchase option, signing him reportedly through 2026	
December 12, 2023	(United States) Andrew Gutman	D	(United States) Colorado Rapids	Acquired from Colorado in exchange for Miguel Navarro and $450k in GAM spread out over 2024 and 2025, and immediately signed to a contract through 2026 with an option for 2027	
December 18, 2023	(United States) Tom Barlow	F	(United States) New York Red Bulls	Acquired from New York in exchange for $250k in GAM spread out over 2024 and 2025 with another $150k if certain requirements are met	
January 14, 2023	(Denmark) Tobias Salquist	D	(Denmark) Silkeborg IF	Signed from Silkeborg on a contract through 2025 with an option for 2026	
January 15, 2023	(United States) Bryan Dowd	G	(United States) Notre Dame	Signed to a contract for 2024 with options through 2027 after being drafted 6th overall in the 2024 MLS SuperDraft	
January 30, 2024	(United States) Chase Gasper	D	(United States) Houston Dynamo	Traded from Houston in exchange for a third round pick in the 2026 MLS SuperDraft	
February 6, 2024	(Belgium) Hugo Cuypers	F	(Belgium) Gent	Acquired as a Designated Player via transfer from K.A.A Gent for a Club-record fee. Contract will run through 2026 with an option for 2027.	
February 13, 2024	(United States) Kellyn Acosta	M	(United States) Los Angeles FC	Signed as a free agent to a contract through 2026 with an option for 2027	
April 3, 2024	(England) Laurence Wootton	M	(United States) Ohio State	Signed to a contract for 2024 with options through 2027 and was immediately loaned out to Indy Eleven	
August 14, 2024	(Costa Rica) Ariel Lassiter	M	(Canada) CF Montréal	Joined from Montreal for $75k in GAM for 2024 and possibly $75k in GAM in 2025 if certain parameters are met	

=== Loaned In ===
Date	Player	Position	Loaning Club	Notes	Ref
January 15, 2024	(Switzerland) Allan Arigoni	D	(Switzerland) FC Lugano	Loaned in for 2024 with an option to buy	

=== Out ===
Date	Player	Position	Destination Club	Notes	Ref
October 23, 2023	(Sierra Leone) Kei Kamara	F	(United States) Los Angeles FC	Contract expired	
November 9, 2023	(United States) Alex Monis	M	(United States) New England Revolution II	Contract expired	
November 22, 2023	(Mexico) Alonso Aceves	D	(Mexico) Pachuca	Loan deal expired	
November 22, 2023	(United States) Kendall Burks	D	(United States) San Antonio FC	Option for 2024 declined	
November 22, 2023	(Ivory Coast) Ousmane Doumbia	M	(Switzerland) FC Lugano	Loan deal expired	
November 22, 2023	(United States) Allan Rodriguez	M		Option for 2024 declined	
December 12, 2023	(Venezuela) Miguel Navarro	D	(United States) Colorado Rapids	Traded to Colorado alongside $450k in GAM in exchange for Andrew Gutman	
February 9, 2024	(Mexico) Jairo Torres	F	(Mexico) FC Juárez	Mutual termination	
February 16, 2024	(Poland) Kacper Przybyłko	F	(Switzerland) FC Lugano	Transfer	
August 14, 2024	(Switzerland) Xherdan Shaqiri	M	(Switzerland) FC Basel	Mutually agreed to terminate contract	

=== Loaned Out ===
Date	Player	Position	Destination Club	Notes	Ref
March 13, 2024	(United States) Justin Reynolds	D	(Switzerland) FC Lugano	Sent on a short-term loan to the Fire's sister club through the end of the Swiss season	
March 14, 2024	(United States) Missael Rodriguez	F	(United States) Union Omaha	Loaned to Omaha for the 2024 USL League One season with the right to recall	
March 19, 2024	(United States) Victor Bezerra	F	(United States) Detroit City FC	Loaned to Detroit for the 2024 USL Championship season with the right to recall	
April 3, 2024	(England) Laurence Wootton	M	(United States) Indy Eleven	Loaned to Indy for the 2024 USL Championship season	
June 27, 2024	(United States) Bryan Dowd	G	(United States) Huntsville City FC	Loaned to Huntsville for the remainder of the 2024 MLS Next Pro season with an option for Nashville SC to purchase after the season	

=== Second team Players Who Joined Fire ===
Player	Position	Date(s)	Ref
(Guyana) Omari Glasgow	F	May 4th vs New England Revolution (played 11 minutes); May 11th vs St. Louis City; May 15 vs Charlotte (played 23 minutes); July 28 vs Sporting Kansas City (League's Cup)	
(Netherlands) Diego Konincks	D	June 15 vs Toronto; July 3rd vs Philadelphia; July 7th vs Seattle; July 13th vs NYCFC	
(United States) David Poreba	M	July 3rd vs Philadelphia; July 13th vs NYCFC; July 17th vs Cincinnati; League's Cup	
(France) Christian Koffi	M	League's Cup	
(El Salvador) Harold Osorio	M	League's Cup	
(United States) Jaylen Shannon	D	League's Cup	

=== Unsigned draft picks and trialists ===
	Player	Position	Previous club	Notes	Ref
R2, P4	(Canada) Oluwaseun Oyegunle	DF	Syracuse	Did not join the team in preseason	
R2, P6	(United States) Jason Shokalook	FW	Akron	Joined the team in Florida for preseason but didn't join the team in California; ultimately signed for the second team	
R3, P14	(United States) Shane de Flores	MF	Stanford	Did not join the team in preseason	

Alongside those listed above, Fire II defenders Lamonth Rochester and Jaylen Shannon and midfielder Omari Glasgow also travelled with the squad to Bradenton during preseason. During the trip to Coachella, Fire academy keeper Patrick Los was added to the roster, while Shannon, Rochester, and Shokalook did not travel with the team.

== Technical staff ==
Position	Staff
Sporting Director	(Switzerland) Georg Heitz
Technical Director	(Germany) Sebastian Pelzer
Head Coach	(United States) Frank Klopas
Assistant Coach	(Brazil) Paulo Nagamura
Assistant Coach	(Spain) Carlos García
Goalkeeping Coach	(United States) Zach Thornton
Set Piece Coach	(England) Ryan Needs
Video Analyst	(Greece) Theodoros Antonopoulos
Video Analyst	(United States) Jeff DeGroot

Last updated: January 19, 2024
Source: Chicago Fire Technical Staff

== Competitions ==
=== Major League Soccer ===
==== Eastern Conference table ====
MLS Eastern Conference table (2024)
Pos	Team	Pld	W	L	T	GF	GA	GD	Pts	Qualification
1	Inter Miami CF	34	22	4	8	79	49	+30	74	Qualification for round one, the 2025 Leagues Cup and the CONCACAF Champions Cup round one
2	Columbus Crew	34	19	6	9	72	40	+32	66	Qualification for round one and the 2025 Leagues Cup
3	FC Cincinnati	34	18	11	5	58	48	+10	59	Qualification for round one and the 2025 Leagues Cup
4	Orlando City SC	34	15	12	7	59	50	+9	52	Qualification for round one and the 2025 Leagues Cup
5	Charlotte FC	34	14	11	9	46	37	+9	51	Qualification for round one and the 2025 Leagues Cup
6	New York City FC	34	14	12	8	54	49	+5	50	Qualification for round one and the 2025 Leagues Cup
7	New York Red Bulls	34	11	9	14	55	50	+5	47	Qualification for round one and the 2025 Leagues Cup
8	CF Montréal	34	11	13	10	48	64	−16	43	Qualification for the wild-card round and the 2025 Leagues Cup
9	Atlanta United FC	34	10	14	10	46	49	−3	40	Qualification for the wild-card round and the 2025 Leagues Cup
10	D.C. United	34	10	14	10	52	70	−18	40	
11	Toronto FC	34	11	19	4	40	61	−21	37	
12	Philadelphia Union	34	9	15	10	62	55	+7	37	
13	Nashville SC	34	9	16	9	38	54	−16	36	
14	New England Revolution	34	9	21	4	37	74	−37	31	
15	Chicago Fire FC	34	7	18	9	40	62	−22	30	

Source: MLS
Rules for classification: 1) points; 2) total wins; 3) total goal differential; 4) total goals scored; 5) fewer disciplinary points; 6) away goal differential; 7) away goals scored; 8) home goals differential; 9) home goals scored; 10) coin toss (2 clubs tied) or drawing of lots (≥3 clubs tied)

==== Overall table ====
Overall MLS standings table
Pos	Team	Pld	W	L	T	GF	GA	GD	Pts	Qualification
25	Nashville SC	34	9	16	9	38	54	−16	36	Qualification for the U.S. Open Cup Round of 32 (Note: As one of the U.S. teams who did not qualify for the 2025 CONCACAF Champions Cup or the 2025 Leagues Cup)
26	New England Revolution	34	9	21	4	37	74	−37	31	Qualification for the U.S. Open Cup Round of 32
27	Sporting Kansas City	34	8	19	7	51	66	−15	31	Qualification for the CONCACAF Champions Cup Round One (Note: Sporting Kansas City qualified as 2024 U.S. Open Cup finalists as the winners, Los Angeles FC, had already qualified via the 2024 Leagues Cup)
28	Chicago Fire FC	34	7	18	9	40	62	−22	30	Qualification for the U.S. Open Cup Round of 32
29	San Jose Earthquakes	34	6	25	3	41	78	−37	21	Qualification for the U.S. Open Cup Round of 32

Source: MLS
Rules for classification: 1) points; 2) total wins; 3) total goal differential; 4) total goals scored; 5) fewer disciplinary points; 6) away goal differential; 7) away goals scored; 8) home goals differential; 9) home goals scored; 10) coin toss (2 clubs tied) or drawing of lots (≥3 clubs tied)

==== Results summary ====
Overall								Home						Away					
Pld	Pts	W	L	T	GF	GA	GD	W	L	T	GF	GA	GD	W	L	T	GF	GA	GD
34	30	7	18	9	40	61	−21	5	8	4	20	31	−11	2	10	5	20	30	−10

Last updated: October 19
Source: MLSsoccer.com standings
Pld = Matches played; Pts = Points; W = Matches won; T = Matches tied; L = Matches lost; GF = Goals for; GA = Goals against; GD = Goal difference

==== Match results ====
===== Preseason =====
January 23 Friendly	Loudoun United	1–5	Chicago Fire FC	Bradenton, Florida
	Unknown		3' Shaqiri; 16' (pen.) Koutsias; 28' Herbers; 69' (pen.) Przybyłko; 90' Wootton	Stadium: IMG Academy

January 27 Friendly	New York Red Bulls	2–2	Chicago Fire FC	Bradenton, Florida
	38' Forsberg; 79' Manoel		41' Gutiérrez; 71' Barlow	Stadium: IMG Academy

February 7 CVI	Austin FC	0-1	Chicago Fire FC	Indio, California
15:00 EST			74' Wootton	Stadium: Empire Polo Club

February 11 CVI	Los Angeles FC	3–1	Chicago Fire FC	Indio, California
14:30 EST	42' Bouanga; 62' Olivera; 72' Ordaz		21' Herbers	Stadium: Empire Polo Club

February 14 CVI	Minnesota United FC	0–4	Chicago Fire FC	Indio, California
16:00 EST	(yellow card) 44' (yellow-red card) 58' Padelford		30' Koutsias; 55' Glasgow; 75' Shaqiri; 81' Haile-Selassie	Stadium: Empire Polo Club

February 17 CVI	Portland Timbers	1-2	Chicago Fire FC	Indio, California
14:00 EST	7' Asprilla		45+2' Giménez; 56' Haile-Selassie	Stadium: Empire Polo Club

===== Regular season =====
February 24 1	Philadelphia Union	2–2	Chicago Fire FC	Chester, Pennsylvania
6:30 PM	55' Uhre; (yellow card) 85' Martínez; 90+2' Gazdag	Report	39' Gutiérrez; (yellow card) 45' Pineda; (yellow card) 69' Brady; 81' Herbers	Stadium: Subaru Park; Attendance: 18,734; Referee: Muhammad Hassan

March 2 2	Chicago Fire FC	1–2	FC Cincinnati	Chicago, Illinois
7:30 PM	45' (pen.) Shaqiri; (yellow card) 55' Acosta; (yellow card) 66' Pineda; (yellow card) 90+4' Gutiérrez	Report	39' Boupendza; (yellow card) 43' Nwobodo; 68' Robinson; (yellow card) 81' Bucha; (yellow card) 84' Baird	Stadium: Soldier Field; Attendance: 26,582; Referee: Mario Maric

March 9 3	Columbus Crew	2–1	Chicago Fire FC	Columbus, Ohio
6:30 PM	68' Russell-Rowe; (yellow card) 90' Malte Amundsen; 90+10' Farsi	Report	(yellow card) 13' Arigoni; 74' Herbers; (yellow card) 90+5' Barlow	Stadium: Lower.com Field; Attendance: 23,327; Referee: Richonne Clark

March 16 4	Chicago Fire FC	4–3	CF Montréal	Chicago, Illinois
1:00 PM	(yellow card) 11' Salquist; (yellow card) 45+4' Gasper; 45+8' Haile-Selassie; (yellow card) 78' Herbers; 84' (pen.) Gutiérrez; 90+5' Cuypers; 90+9' Acosta	Report	7' (pen.), 12' (pen.), (yellow card) 16' Cóccaro; 70' Yankov; (red card) 82' Edwards; (yellow card) 90+11' Choinière	Stadium: Soldier Field; Attendance: 14,874; Referee: DeShun Beard

March 23 5	New England Revolution	1–1	Chicago Fire FC	Foxborough, Massachusetts
1:00 PM	45+4' N. Gil; (yellow card) 60' Harkes; (yellow card) 81' Polster; (yellow card) 90+5' C. Gil	Report	(yellow card) 18' Herbers; 20' Cuypers; (yellow card) 44' Gutiérrez; (yellow card) 45+2' Arigoni; (yellow card) 90' Barlow	Stadium: Gillette Stadium; Attendance: 15,269; Referee: Kyle Johnston

March 31 6	Atlanta United FC	3–0	Chicago Fire FC	Atlanta, Georgia
2:30 PM	45' Giakoumakis; (yellow card) 50' Wiley; 65', 90+5' Thiaré; (yellow card) 90' Lennon	Report	(yellow card) 65' Herbers; (red card) 84' Terán	Stadium: Mercedes-Benz Stadium; Attendance: 42,525; Referee: Lukasz Szpala

April 6 7	Chicago Fire FC	2–1	Houston Dynamo	Chicago, Illinois
7:30 PM	10' (pen.) Shaqiri; (yellow card) 68' Czichos; 78' Gutiérrez	Report	(yellow card) 44' Sviatchenko; 65' Aliyu	Stadium: Soldier Field; Attendance: 18,844; Referee: Malik Badawi

April 13 8	New York Red Bulls	0–0	Chicago Fire FC	Harrison, New Jersey
6:30 PM	(red card) 42' Reyes	Report	(yellow card) 55' Acosta; (yellow card) 75' Czichos	Stadium: Red Bull Arena; Attendance: 17,501; Referee: Sergii Boiko

April 20 9	Chicago Fire FC	0–4	Real Salt Lake	Chicago, Illinois
7:30 PM	(yellow card) 15' Acosta	Report	24', (yellow card) 31' Gómez; 33', 37' Arango; 90+3' Luna	Stadium: Soldier Field; Attendance: 14,247; Referee: Marcos de Oliveira

April 27 10	Chicago Fire FC	0–0	Atlanta United FC	Chicago, Illinois
7:30 PM	(yellow card) 75' Arigoni	Report	(yellow card) 46' Lennon; (yellow card) 89' Slisz; (yellow card) 90+7' Mosquera	Stadium: Soldier Field; Attendance: 18,236; Referee: Filip Dujic

May 4 11	Chicago Fire FC	0–1	New England Revolution	Chicago, Illinois
8:25 PM	(yellow card) 83' Arigoni	Report	(yellow card) 22' Kessler; (yellow card) 50' Lima; 62', (yellow card) 72' Chancalay; (yellow card) 90+6' Ivačič	Stadium: Soldier Field; Attendance: 18,379; Referee: Sergii Demianchuk

May 11 12	St. Louis City SC	3–1	Chicago Fire FC	St. Louis, Missouri
7:30 PM	2', (yellow card) 45+1' Alm; 56', 67' Klauss	Report	(yellow card) 22' Herbers; 46' Cuypers; (yellow card) 61' Shaqiri; (yellow card) 90+1' Terán	Stadium: CityPark; Attendance: 22,500; Referee: Pierre-Luc Lauziere

May 15 13	Chicago Fire FC	0–1	Charlotte FC	Chicago, Illinois
7:30 PM	(yellow card) 34' Terán; (yellow card) 50' Czichos	Report	60' Westwood; (yellow card) 64' Agyemang; (yellow card) 73' Dejaegere	Stadium: Soldier Field; Attendance: 12,806; Referee: Victor Rivas

May 18 14	Chicago Fire FC	1–3	Columbus Crew	Chicago, Illinois
7:30 PM	(yellow card) 24' Czichos; (yellow card) 45' Gutiérrez; 85' Terán; (yellow card) 90+3' Navarro	Report	30' Diego Rossi; 55' Ramirez; 88' Russell-Rowe	Stadium: Soldier Field; Attendance: 23,319; Referee: Ricardo Fierro

May 25 15	D.C. United	1–1	Chicago Fire FC	Washington, D.C.
6:30 PM	20' McVey; (yellow card) 42' Dájome; (yellow card) 46' Benteke; (yellow card) 83' Birnbaum	Report	(yellow card) 36' Arigoni; (yellow card) 45' Terán; 53' Acosta	Stadium: Audi Field; Attendance: 19,081; Referee: Mark Allatin

May 29 16	Chicago Fire FC	1–1	Orlando City SC	Chicago, Illinois
7:30 PM	(yellow card) 47' Navarro; (yellow card) 54' Gutiérrez; 70' Cuypers; (yellow card) 90+2' Dean	Report	4' Torres; (yellow card) 46' Jansson	Stadium: Soldier Field; Attendance: 11,372; Referee: Malik Badawi

June 1 17	Chicago Fire FC	2–1	LA Galaxy	Chicago, Illinois
7:30 PM	(yellow card) 29' Pineda; 32' Cuypers; 61' Gutiérrez; (yellow card) 75' Hebers; (yellow card) 90+5' Arigoni	Report	7' Puig; (yellow card) 45+4' Cerrillo; (yellow card) 77' Cuevas	Stadium: Soldier Field; Attendance: 25,237; Referee: Marcos DeOliveira II

June 15 18	Toronto FC	1–4	Chicago Fire FC	Toronto, Ontario
6:30 PM	44' Insigne	Report	41' Haile-Selassie; 57' Cuypers; 60' Pineda; 89' Arigoni	Stadium: BMO Field; Attendance: 28,303; Referee: Pierre-Luc Lauziere

June 22 19	Orlando City SC	4–2	Chicago Fire FC	Orlando, Florida
6:30 PM	4', 60' Torres; 20' (pen.) Muriel; 29' Angulo; (yellow card) 83' Araújo	Report	(yellow card) 46', (goal) 69' Cuypers; 53' (pen.) Haile-Selassie	Stadium: Inter&Co Stadium; Attendance: 22,038; Referee: Natalie Simon

June 29 20	Seattle Sounders FC	2–1	Chicago Fire FC	Seattle, Washington
9:30 PM	57' (pen.), 90+3' (pen.), (yellow card) 90+4' Rusnák; (yellow card) 77' Ragen	Report	30' Haile-Selassie; (yellow card) 42' Pineda; (yellow card) 56' Dean	Stadium: Lumen Field; Attendance: 30,045; Referee: Joe Dickerson

July 3 21	Chicago Fire FC	4–3	Philadelphia Union	Chicago, Illinois
7:30 PM	(yellow card) 4' Omsberg; 30' Haile-Selassie; (yellow card) 45+7' Brady; 82', 90+2' Cuypers; 89' Giménez	Report	(yellow card) 32' Glesnes; 38' Donovan; 45+7' (pen.), (yellow card) 54' Gazdag; 49' McGlynn	Stadium: Soldier Field; Attendance: 19,453; Referee: Abdou Ndiaye

July 7 22	San Jose Earthquakes	1–0	Chicago Fire FC	San Jose, California
7:30 PM	49', (yellow card) 62' López; (yellow card) 87' Skahan	Report	(yellow card) 24' Czichos; (yellow card) 37' Acosta; (yellow card) 90+5' Herbers	Stadium: PayPal Park; Referee: Ramy Touchan

July 13 23	Chicago Fire FC	0–0	New York City FC	Chicago, Illinois
7:30 PM	(yellow card) 25' Omsberg; (yellow card) 45' Acosta; (yellow card) 80' Koutsias; (yellow card) 84' Pineda	Report	(yellow card) 21' Haak; (yellow card) 59' Sands	Stadium: Soldier Field; Attendance: 25,179; Referee: Rosendo Mendoza

July 17 24	FC Cincinnati	0–1	Chicago Fire FC	Cincinnati, Ohio
6:30 PM	(yellow card) 88' (yellow-red card) Powell; (yellow card) 89' Yedlin	Report	(yellow card) 35' Herbers; (yellow card) 58' Cuypers; 69' Gutiérrez; (yellow card) 90+3' Koutsias	Stadium: TQL Stadium; Attendance: 25,503; Referee: Filip Dujic

July 20 25	Inter Miami CF	2–1	Chicago Fire FC	Fort Lauderdale, Florida
6:30 PM	6' Rojas; (yellow card) 39' Taylor; 75' Alba; (yellow card) 85' Fray	Report	73' Czichos; (yellow card) 88' Gutiérrez	Stadium: Chase Stadium; Attendance: 20,318; Referee: Marcos DeOliveira II

August 24 26	New York City FC	2–2	Chicago Fire FC	New York, New York
6:30 PM	15', 22' Martínez; (yellow card) 50' Gray; (yellow card) 90' Parks; (yellow card) 90+3' Freese	Report	(yellow card) 65' Giménez; 78' Cuypers; (yellow card) 90' Navarro; 90+4' (pen.) Gutiérrez	Stadium: Citi Field; Attendance: 24,428; Referee: Malik Badawi

August 31 27	Chicago Fire FC	1–4	Inter Miami CF	Chicago, Illinois
7:30 PM	(yellow card) 29' Cuypers; (yellow card) 64' Czichos; 82' Koutsias	Report	25' (o.g.) Salquist; (yellow card) 45' Fray; 46', 65', (yellow card) 76' Suárez; (yellow card) 58' Redondo; (yellow card) 79' Martínez; (yellow card) 83' Cremaschi; Taylor	Stadium: Soldier Field; Attendance: 55,385; Referee: Pierre-Luc Lauziere

September 7 28	Chicago Fire FC	1–2	D.C. United	Bridgeview, Illinois
7:30 PM	(yellow card) 45+1', (goal) 54' Gutman	Report	26' Benteke; 29' Pirani; (yellow card) 73' Badji; (yellow card) 90' Klich	Stadium: SeatGeek Stadium; Attendance: 16,426; Referee: Fotis Bazakos

September 14 29	Chicago Fire FC	2–1	New York Red Bulls	Chicago, Illinois
7:30 PM	(yellow card) 16' Mueller; 31' Barlow; (yellow card) 57' Lassiter; 75' Koutsias; (yellow card) 87' Haile-Selassie	Report	47' Gjengaar; (yellow card) 90+7' Vanzeir	Stadium: Soldier Field; Attendance: 22,188; Referee: Mark Allatin

September 18 30	Nashville SC	1–0	Chicago Fire FC	Nashville, Tennessee
7:30 PM	19' Surridge; (yellow card) 21' Godoy; (yellow card) 26' Lovitz; (yellow card) 85' Yazbek; (yellow card) 85' Ajago; (yellow card) 91' Willis	Report	(yellow card) 64' Omsberg	Stadium: Geodis Park; Attendance: 27,967; Referee: Rubiel Vazquez

September 21 31	CF Montréal	2–0	Chicago Fire FC	Montreal, Quebec
6:30 PM	21' Martínez; (yellow card) 40' Campbell; 74' Clark	Report		Stadium: Saputo Stadium; Attendance: 19,619; Referee: Lukasz Szpala

September 28 32	Chicago Fire FC	1–1	Toronto FC	Bridgeview, Illinois
7:30 PM	(yellow card) 17' Giménez; (yellow card) 58' Acosta; 84' Dean; (yellow card) 90+1' Czichos; (yellow card) 90+2' Omsberg	Report	45+4' (pen.) Owusu; (yellow card) 45+11' Osorio; (yellow card) 60' O'Neill; (yellow card) 83' Johnson	Stadium: SeatGeek Stadium; Attendance: 16,097; Referee: Ricardo Montero

October 2 33	Charlotte FC	4–3	Chicago Fire FC	Charlotte, North Carolina
6:30 PM	8', 45+1', (yellow card) 69' Świderski; (yellow card) 16', (goal) 58' Abada; 30' Urso; (yellow card) 90+3' Kahlina	Report	25' Herbers; (yellow card) 64' Navarro; 67' Acosta; 90+3' Barlow	Stadium: Bank of America Stadium; Attendance: 26,899; Referee: Sergii Boiko

October 19 34	Chicago Fire FC	0–3	Nashville SC	Chicago, Illinois
5:00 PM	(yellow card) 57' Navarro	Report	54' Muyl; (yellow card) 60' Gaines; (yellow card) 63', (goal) 90+1' Shaffelburg; (yellow card) 69' Godoy; 87' Sam Surridge	Stadium: Soldier Field; Attendance: 23,942; Referee: Jon Freemon

=== U.S. Open Cup ===
Chicago Fire FC was not sent to the tournament, but their MLS Next Pro team Chicago Fire FC II was sent instead following the deal reached on March 1, 2024.

=== Leagues Cup ===
==== West 4 ====
Pos	Team	Pld	W	PW	PL	L	GF	GA	GD	Pts	Qualification	TOL	SKC	CHI
1	(Mexican Football Federation) Toluca	2	2	0	0	0	5	2	+3	6	Advance to knockout stage	—	2–1	3–1
2	(United States Soccer Federation) Sporting Kansas City	2	1	0	0	1	3	3	0	3	Advance to knockout stage	—	—	2–1
3	(United States Soccer Federation) Chicago Fire FC	2	0	0	0	2	2	5	−3	0		—	—	—

Source: Leagues Cup
Rules for classification: Tiebreakers

July 28 GS	Sporting Kansas City (United States)	2–1	(United States) Chicago Fire FC	Kansas City, Kansas
8:00 PM	39' Castellanos; 76' Agada	Report	22' Koutsias; (yellow card) 53' Shannon	Stadium: Children's Mercy Park; Referee: Rubiel Vazquez

August 1 GS	Toluca (Mexico)	3–1	(United States) Chicago Fire FC	Bridgeview, Illinois
8:00 PM	(yellow card) 27' Baeza; 30' Angulo; 45', 66' Ruiz	Report	8' Koutsias; (yellow card) 75' Navarro; (yellow card) 80' Acosta	Stadium: SeatGeek Stadium; Referee: Josué Ugalde

== Statistics ==
Note: italics indicates a player who left during the season while * indicates a Fire II player that joined on a short-term loan or for the League's Cup

=== Games played ===
No.	Pos.	Nat.	Name	MLS				Leagues Cup				Total			
No.	Pos.	Nat.	Name	Starts	Apps	Minutes	Bench	Starts	Apps	Minutes	Bench	Starts	Apps	Minutes	Bench
2	DF	FRA	Arnaud Souquet	21	26	1874	5	2	2	169		23	24	2043	5
4	DF	COL	Carlos Terán	14	18	1221	5					14	18	1221	5
5	DF	GER	Rafael Czichos	27	29	2336					1	27	29	2336	1
7	MF	SUI	Maren Haile-Selassie	23	27	2040		2	2	164		25	29	2204	
8	FW	USA	Chris Mueller	15	27	1338	6				1	15	27	1338	7
9	FW	BEL	Hugo Cuypers	31	31	2630						31	31	2630	
10	MF	SWI	Xherdan Shaqiri	9	12	745						9	12	745	
11	MF	CRC	Ariel Lassiter	5	7	447						5	7	447	
12	FW	USA	Tom Barlow	5	28	731	6	1	2	76		6	30	807	6
14	DF	DEN	Tobias Salquist	10	14	917	6	2	2	164		12	16	1081	6
15	DF	USA	Andrew Gutman	11	11	736	1		2	27		11	13	763	1
16	DF	USA	Wyatt Omsberg	11	12	838	13		1	16		11	13	854	13
17	MF	USA	Brian Gutiérrez	26	32	2376		2	2	180		28	34	2556	
18	GK	USA	Spencer Richey	1	1	90	33	2	2	180		3	3	270	33
19	FW	GRE	Georgios Koutsias	5	30	794	3	2	2	166		7	32	960	3
21	MF	GER	Fabian Herbers	24	30	2038	1	2	2	164		26	32	2202	1
22	DF	USA	Mauricio Pineda	11	21	1143	10	1	1	90		12	22	1233	10
23	MF	USA	Kellyn Acosta	27	34	2511		2	2	180		29	36	2491	
24	DF	USA	Jonathan Dean	12	24	1103	9					12	24	1103	9
25	GK	USA	Jeff Gal				2				2				4
27	DF	SUI	Allan Arigoni	25	28	2098	4				1	25	28	2098	5
30	MF	PAR	Gastón Giménez	18	29	1687	3	2	2	164		20	31	1851	
31	MF	ARG	Federico Navarro	8	15	677	7		1	16	1	8	16	693	8
32	MF	USA	Missael Rodriguez												
33	FW	USA	Victor Bezerra												
34	GK	USA	Chris Brady	33	33	2970					2	33	33	2970	2
35	MF	USA	Sergio Oregel												
36	DF	USA	Justin Reynolds	1	8	190	1	1	1	90		2	9	280	1
37	MF	USA	Javier Casas		1	1	12				2		1	1	14
38	MF	ENG	Laurence Wootton												
42	DF	NED	Diego Konnincks*				4								
43	DF	USA	Jaylen Shannon*					1	1	56		1	1	56	
45	MF	SLV	Harold Osorio*												
48	MF	POL	David Poreba*				3								
50	MF	FRA	Christian Koffi*						2	44			2	44	
55	FW	GUY	Omari Glasgow*		2	34	1		1	34			3	68	1
77	DF	USA	Chase Gasper	2	4	241	1					2	4	241	1
78	GK	USA	Bryan Dowd												

=== Goalkeeping ===
No.	Nat.	Name	MLS			Leagues Cup			Total		
No.	Nat.	Name	Clean Sheets	Saves	GA	Clean Sheets	Saves	GA	Clean Sheets	Saves	GA
18	USA	Spencer Richey		3	1		12	5		15	6
25	USA	Jeff Gal									
34	USA	Chris Brady	4	106	60				4	106	60
78	USA	Bryan Dowd									

=== Goals ===
Rk.	Player	MLS	League's Cup	Total
Rk.	Player	Goal	Goal	Goal
1	(Belgium) Hugo Cuypers	10	0	10
2	(United States) Brian Gutiérrez	6	0	6
3	(Switzerland) Maren Haile-Selassie	5	0	5
4	(Greece) Georgios Koutsias	2	2	4
5	(United States) Kellyn Acosta	3	0	3
5	(Germany) Fabian Herbers	3	0	3
7	(United States) Tom Barlow	2	0	2
7	(Switzerland) Xherdan Shaqiri	2	0	2
9	(Switzerland) Allan Arigoni	1	0	1
9	(Germany) Rafael Czichos	1	0	1
9	(United States) Jonathan Dean	1	0	1
9	(Paraguay) Gastón Giménez	1	0	1
9	(United States) Andrew Gutman	1	0	1
9	(United States) Mauricio Pineda	1	0	1
9	(Colombia) Carlos Terán	1	0	1

=== Assists ===
Rk.	Player	MLS	League's Cup	Total
Rk.	Player	A	A	A
1	(Switzerland) Maren Haile-Selassie	8	0	8
1	(Germany) Fabian Herbers	5	0	5
3	(United States) Brian Gutiérrez	3	2	5
4	(United States) Kellyn Acosta	3	0	3
4	(Paraguay) Gastón Giménez	3	0	3
4	(United States) Chris Mueller	3	0	3
7	(Belgium) Hugo Cuypers	2	0	2
7	(Germany) Rafael Czichos	2	0	2
7	(Costa Rica) Ariel Lassiter	2	0	2
7	(Switzerland) Xherdan Shaqiri	2	0	2
11	(United States) Chris Brady	1	0	1
11	(United States) Andrew Gutman	1	0	1
11	(Greece) Georgios Koutsias	1	0	1
11	(Denmark) Tobias Salquist	1	0	1
11	(France) Arnaud Souquet	1	0	1
11	(Colombia) Carlos Terán	1	0	1

=== Disciplinary record ===
Rk.	Player	MLS			League's Cup			Total		
Rk.	Player	Yellow card	Second yellow card	Red card	Yellow card	Second yellow card	Red card	Yellow card	Second yellow card	Red card
1	(Colombia) Carlos Terán	3	0	1	0	0	0	3	0	1
2	(United States) Kellyn Acosta	6	0	0	1	0	0	7	0	0
2	(Germany) Rafael Czichos	7	0	0	0	0	0	7	0	0
2	(Germany) Fabian Herbers	7	0	0	0	0	0	7	0	0
5	(Switzerland) Allan Arigoni	6	0	0	0	0	0	6	0	0
5	(Argentina) Federico Navarro	5	0	0	1	0	0	6	0	0
7	(United States) Brian Gutiérrez	5	0	0	0	0	0	5	0	0
7	(United States) Mauricio Pineda	5	0	0	0	0	0	5	0	0
9	(United States) Wyatt Omsberg	4	0	0	0	0	0	4	0	0
10	(Belgium) Hugo Cuypers	3	0	0	0	0	0	3	0	0
11	(United States) Tom Barlow	2	0	0	0	0	0	2	0	0
11	(United States) Chris Brady	2	0	0	0	0	0	2	0	0
11	(United States) Jonathan Dean	2	0	0	0	0	0	2	0	0
11	(Paraguay) Gastón Giménez	2	0	0	0	0	0	2	0	0
11	(Greece) Georgios Koutsias	2	0	0	0	0	0	2	0	0
16	(United States) Chase Gasper	1	0	0	0	0	0	1	0	0
16	(United States) Andrew Gutman	1	0	0	0	0	0	1	0	0
16	(Switzerland) Maren Haile-Selassie	1	0	0	0	0	0	1	0	0
16	(Costa Rica) Ariel Lassiter	1	0	0	0	0	0	1	0	0
16	(Denmark) Tobias Salquist	1	0	0	0	0	0	1	0	0
16	(United States) Jaylen Shannon*	0	0	0	1	0	0	1	0	0
16	(Switzerland) Xherdan Shaqiri	1	0	0	0	0	0	1	0	0

== Awards ==
=== MLS Team of the Matchday ===
Matchday	Player	Position	Report
1/2	(United States) Brian Gutiérrez	M	
5	(United States) Kellyn Acosta	M	
8	(Switzerland) Xherdan Shaqiri	M	
11	(United States) Chris Brady (1)	G	
18	(United States) Brian Gutiérrez	M	
20	(Germany) Fabian Herbers	M	
20	(United States) Frank Klopas	Coach	
24	(Belgium) Hugo Cuypers	F	
24	(Switzerland) Maren Haile-Selassie	Bench	
27	(United States) Chris Brady (2)	G	
31	(United States) Andrew Gutman	Bench	
32	(Greece) Georgios Koutsias	Bench	

=== MLS Player of the Matchday ===
Week	Player	Statistics	Report
24	(Belgium) Hugo Cuypers	2 goals	

== Second team statistics ==
Note: Stats are for regular and post season combined

=== Games played ===
No.	Pos.	Nat.	Name	MLS Next Pro			MLS Next Pro Playoffs			Open Cup			Total		
No.	Pos.	Nat.	Name	Starts	Apps	Minutes	Starts	Apps	Minutes	Starts	Apps	Minutes	Starts	Apps	Minutes
2	DF	FRA	Arnaud Souquet	1	1	45							1	1	45
16	DF	USA	Wyatt Omsberg	1	1	45				1	1	45	2	2	90
18	GK	USA	Spencer Richey	2	2	180				1	1	45	3	3	225
24	DF	USA	Jonathan Dean	1	1	90							1	1	90
25	GK	USA	Jeff Gal	7	7	630	1	1	120				8	8	750
31	MF	ARG	Federico Navarro	1	1	45							1	1	45
35	MF	USA	Sergio Oregel	20	21	1616	2	2	172	1	2	129	23	25	1917
36	DF	USA	Justin Reynolds	3	4	234	2	2	176				5	6	410
37	MF	USA	Javier Casas	13	13	1003	2	2	152	2	2	111	17	17	1266

=== Goalkeeping ===
No.	Pos.	Nat.	Name	MLS Next Pro			MLS Next Pro Playoffs			Open Cup			Total		
No.	Pos.	Nat.	Name	Clean Sheets	Saves	GA	Clean Sheets	Saves	GA	Clean Sheets	Saves	GA	Clean Sheets	Saves	GA
18	GK	USA	Spencer Richey		11	6				1	1		1	12	6
25	GK	USA	Jeff Gal	1	17	8		8	1				1	25	9

=== Goals and assists ===
Rank	Player	Goal	A
1	(United States) Javier Casas	2	1
2	(United States) Sergio Oregel	1	2
3	(United States) Justin Reynolds		1

=== Cards ===
Rk.	Player	MLS Next Pro			MLS Next Pro Playoffs			Open Cup			Total		
Rk.	Player	Yellow card	Second yellow card	Red card	Yellow card	Second yellow card	Red card	Yellow card	Second yellow card	Red card	Yellow card	Second yellow card	Red card
1	(United States) Sergio Oregel	6	0	0	0	0	0	1	0	0	7	0	0
2	(United States) Justin Reynolds	1	0	0	1	0	0	0	0	0	2	0	0
3	(United States) Javier Casas	1	0	0	0	0	0	0	0	0	1	0	0
