= Carlos Terán =

Colombian footballer (born 2000)

Personal information
- Full name: Carlos Terán Díaz
- Date of birth: 24 September 2000 (age 26)
- Place of birth: Turbo, Colombia
- Height: 6 ft 2 in (1.88 m)
- Position: Centre-back

Team information
- Current team: Athletico Paranaense
- Number: 22

Youth career
- Envigado

Senior career*
Years	Team	Apps	(Gls)
2019–2020	Envigado	17	(0)
2020–2025	Chicago Fire	87	(5)
2022	Chicago Fire II	2	(0)
2025–	Athletico Paranaense	27	(0)

International career^{‡}
2019	Colombia U20	1	(0)
2020	Colombia U23	2	(0)
- * Club domestic league appearances and goals as of 16:44, 10 November 2026 (UTC) ‡ National team caps and goals as of 18:44, 5 July 2019 (UTC)

Carlos Terán Díaz (born 24 September 2000) is a Colombian professional footballer who plays as a centre-back for Campeonato Brasileiro Série A club Athletico Paranaense.

== Club career ==
=== Envigado ===
Born in Turbo, Colombia, Terán began his career with Categoría Primera A club Envigado. He made his professional debut for the club on 30 January 2019 against Deportivo Pasto, starting in a 1–1 draw. He ended his first season with Envigado appearing in 13 matches, starting 12.

=== Chicago Fire ===
On 21 August 2020, Terán joined American Major League Soccer club Chicago Fire. He made his debut on 28 October, in a 2–1 league defeat against the Philadelphia Union, coming on as a 78th-minute substitute.

On 29 April 2023, Terán extended his contract with Chicago until the end of 2026, with a club option for the 2027 season. Terán underwent a successful surgery on his right knee in January 2024.

== International career ==
Terán has represented Colombia at both the iunder-20 and iunder-23 sides. He made his debut for the Colombia under-20's on 23 May 2019 against Poland U20, coming on as a substitute. Terán was then selected into the Colombia under-23 squad for the CONMEBOL Pre-Olympic Tournament in 2020, making his debut on 18 January 2020 against Argentina U23. starting in a 3–1 defeat.

== Personal life ==
In 2022, Terán received his U.S. Green Card, granting him permanent residency in the country.

== Career statistics ==
As of 10 November 2026

Appearances and goals by club, season and competition
Club	Season	League			Cup		Continental		Other		Total	
Club	Season	Division	Apps	Goals	Apps	Goals	Apps	Goals	Apps	Goals	Apps	Goals
Envigado	2019	Categoría Primera A	13	0	3	0	—		—		16	0
Envigado	2020	Categoría Primera A	4	0	0	0	—		—		4	0
Envigado	Total		17	0	3	0	—		—		20	0
Chicago Fire	2020	Major League Soccer	2	0	—		—		—		2	0
Chicago Fire	2021	Major League Soccer	13	1	—		—		—		13	1
Chicago Fire	2022	Major League Soccer	22	1	0	0	—		—		22	1
Chicago Fire	2023	Major League Soccer	24	1	0	0	—		3 (Note: Appearance(s) in the Leagues Cup)	0	27	1
Chicago Fire	2024	Major League Soccer	18	1	—		—		—		18	1
Chicago Fire	2025	Major League Soccer	8	1	0	0	—		—		8	1
Chicago Fire	Total		87	5	—		—		3	0	90	5
Chicago Fire II	2022	MLS Next Pro	2	0	—		—		—		2	0
Athletico Paranaense	2025	Série B	10	0	1	0	—		—		11	0
Athletico Paranaense	2026	Série A	17	0	1	0	—		—		18	0
Athletico Paranaense	Total		27	0	2	0	—		—		29	0
Career total			133	5	5	0	0	0	3	0	141	5
