= Brian Gutiérrez =

Mexican soccer player (born 2003)

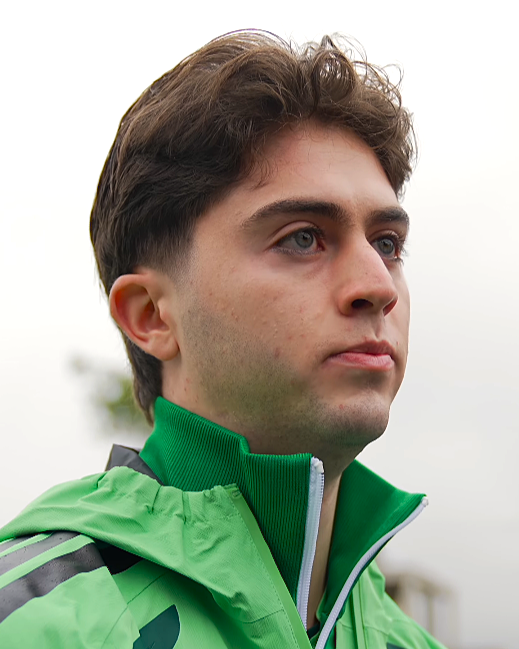
- Gutiérrez with Mexico in 2026

Personal information
- Date of birth: 17 June 2003 (age 23)
- Place of birth: Berwyn, Illinois, U.S.
- Height: 1.78 m (5 ft 10 in)
- Positions: Attacking midfielder; winger

Team information
- Current team: Guadalajara
- Number: 11

Youth career
- 2015–2020: Chicago Fire

Senior career*
| Years | Team | Apps | (Gls) |
| 2020–2025 | Chicago Fire | 149 | (19) |
| 2026– | Guadalajara | 30 | (2) |

International career^{‡}
| 2019 | United States U16 | 3 | (0) |
| 2021–2022 | United States U20 | 7 | (2) |
| 2023 | United States U23 | 2 | (0) |
| 2025 | United States | 2 | (0) |
| 2026– | Mexico | 11 | (2) |
- * Club domestic league appearances and goals as of 8 November 2026 ‡ National team caps and goals as of 5 July 2026

Brian Gutiérrez (born 17 June 2003) is a professional soccer player who plays as an attacking midfielder for Liga MX club Guadalajara. Born in the United States, he represents the Mexico national team.

== Early life ==
Gutiérrez was born on 17 June 2003 in Berwyn, Illinois, U.S. He graduated from Reavis High School in Burbank, Illinois.

== Club career ==
=== Chicago Fire ===
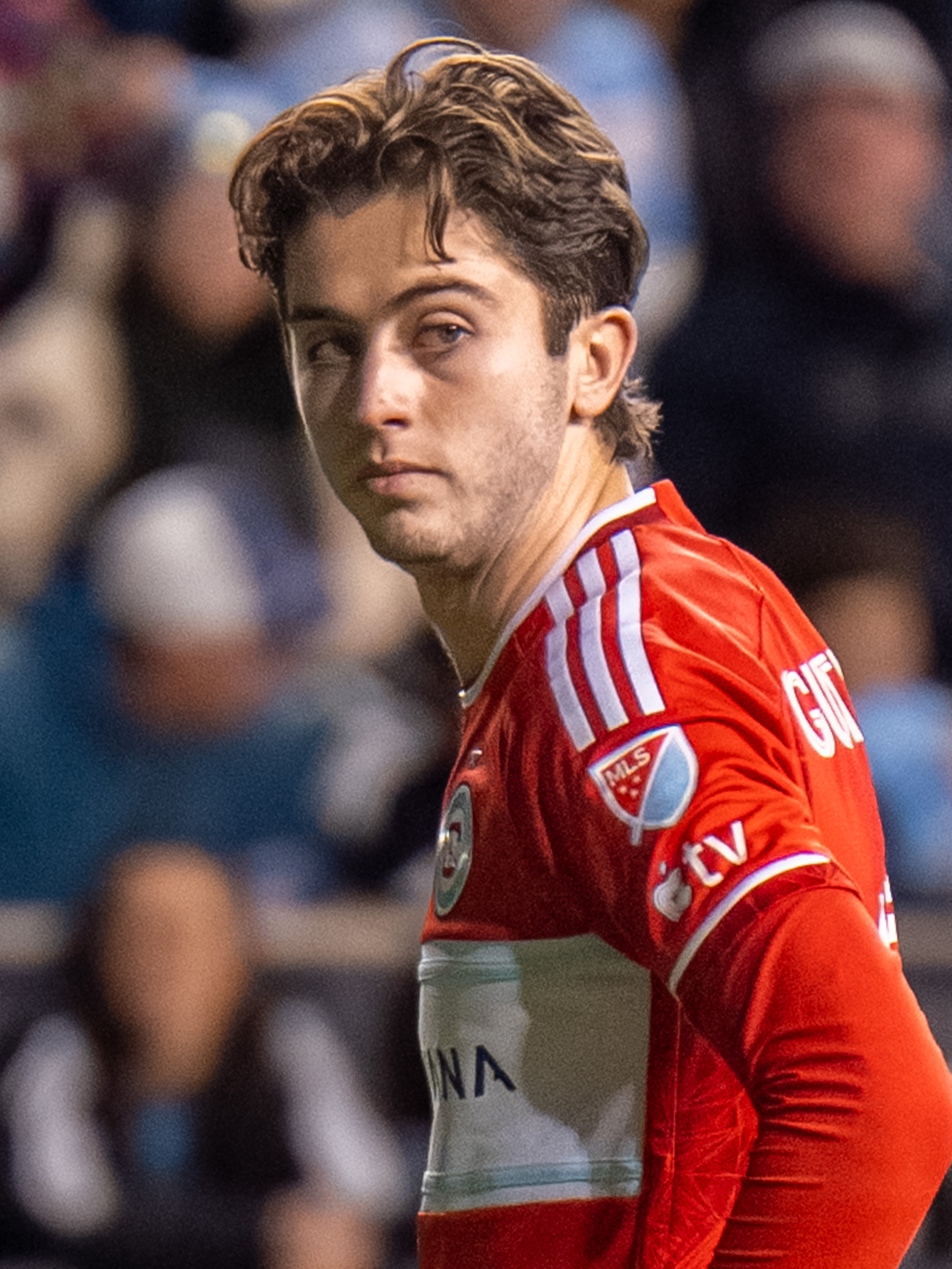
Gutiérrez with Chicago Fire in 2025

Gutiérrez began his career with the Chicago Fire youth academy in 2015. On 9 March 2020, he signed a homegrown player deal with the club's first team in Major League Soccer (MLS). Gutiérrez made his professional debut for the Chicago Fire on 20 August 2020, against Columbus Crew, coming on as an 82nd-minute substitute in a 3–0 defeat. He netted his first MLS goal on 3 July 2022, scoring in a one-on-one with goalkeeper JT Marcinkowski in a 2–1 loss to the San Jose Earthquakes.

Gutiérrez helped Chicago qualify for the 2025 MLS Cup playoffs, which marked the club's first playoff berth since 2017. In the wild card round, he scored the first goal in a 3–1 win over Orlando City.

=== Guadalajara ===
On 12 December 2025, Gutiérrez joined Mexican club Guadalajara for a reported fee of $5 million. He made his Liga MX debut on 10 January 2026 in a home match against Pachuca as a starter, contributing an assist at the 17th minute for the first goal of a 2–0 home victory. Gutiérrez scored his first goal with Chivas on 18 March, the first in a 5–0 home victory against León. At the end of the season, Gutiérrez won the award for Best Rookie.

== International career ==
=== United States ===
Gutiérrez has played for the US youth national teams at multiple levels. In 2019, he helped the under-16 team claim the Nike International Friendlies title after providing an assist in their 3–2 win over Turkey in the final. Gutiérrez later played for the under-20 team at both the 2021 and 2022 editions of the Revelations Cup. He was also called up to the under-23 team for a pair of friendlies against Mexico and Japan.

Gutiérrez was in consideration for the U.S. senior national team in December 2021. In January 2025, he played two friendlies for the U.S. against Venezuela and Costa Rica.

=== Mexico ===
On 6 November 2025, Gutiérrez's management announced the player was considering switching to the Mexico national team. This was possible under FIFA eligibility rules, which allowed players with less than three senior international caps prior to the age of 21 to switch allegiances.

On 15 January 2026, Gutiérrez was called up by Mexico manager Javier Aguirre and appeared in a friendly match against Panama on 22 January, the same day that FIFA officials authorized his allegiance switch to Mexico. On 25 February 2026, Gutiérrez scored his first goal for Mexico in a friendly match against Iceland in stoppage time as Mexico took the 4–0 win. He scored again in another friendly on 22 May, netting in the second minute of a 2–0 win over Ghana.

On 31 May, Gutiérrez was named in the final roster for the 2026 FIFA World Cup. He is one of two U.S.-born players on the squad, along with Alaska-born Obed Vargas. Gutiérrez's participation at the 2026 World Cup cap-tied him permanently to the Mexican national team.

== Personal life ==
Born in the United States, Gutiérrez is of Mexican descent through both of his parents, who are originally from San Juan de los Lagos, Jalisco. He obtained his Mexican citizenship in November 2025, making him eligible to play for the Mexico national team.

== Career statistics ==
=== Club ===
As of match played on 8 November 2026

Appearances and goals by club, season and competition
| Club | Season | League | | | National cup (Note: Includes US Open Cup) | | Other | | Total | |
| Club | Season | Division | Apps | Goals | Apps | Goals | Apps | Goals | Apps | Goals |
|---|---|---|---|---|---|---|---|---|---|---|
| Chicago Fire | 2020 | Major League Soccer | 6 | 0 | — | | — | | 6 | 0 |
| Chicago Fire | 2021 | Major League Soccer | 17 | 0 | — | | — | | 17 | 0 |
| Chicago Fire | 2022 | Major League Soccer | 33 | 2 | 1 | 0 | — | | 34 | 2 |
| Chicago Fire | 2023 | Major League Soccer | 32 | 2 | 3 | 0 | 3 (Note: Appearances in Leagues Cup) | 0 | 38 | 2 |
| Chicago Fire | 2024 | Major League Soccer | 32 | 6 | — | | 2 | 0 | 34 | 6 |
| Chicago Fire | 2025 | Major League Soccer | 29 | 9 | 3 | 1 | 3 (Note: Appearances in MLS Cup Playoffs) | 1 | 35 | 11 |
| Chicago Fire | Total | | 149 | 19 | 7 | 1 | 8 | 1 | 164 | 21 |
| Guadalajara | 2025–26 | Liga MX | 17 | 2 | — | | — | | 17 | 2 |
| Guadalajara | 2026–27 | Liga MX | 13 | 0 | — | | 3 | 0 | 16 | 0 |
| Guadalajara | Total | | 30 | 2 | — | | 3 | 0 | 33 | 2 |
| Career total | | | 179 | 21 | 7 | 1 | 11 | 1 | 197 | 23 |

=== International ===
As of match played on 5 July 2026

Appearances and goals by national team and year
| National team | Year | Apps | Goals |
|---|---|---|---|
| United States | 2025 | 2 | 0 |
| United States | Total | 2 | 0 |
| Mexico | 2026 | 11 | 2 |
| Mexico | Total | 11 | 2 |
| Career total | | 13 | 2 |

Scores and results list Mexico's goal tally first.

List of international goals scored by Brian Gutiérrez
| No. | Date | Venue | Opponent | Score | Result | Competition |
|---|---|---|---|---|---|---|
| 1 | 25 February 2026 | Estadio Corregidora, Querétaro, Mexico | Iceland | 4–0 | 4–0 | Friendly |
| 2 | 22 May 2026 | Estadio Cuauhtémoc, Puebla, Mexico | Ghana | 1–0 | 2–0 | Friendly |

== Honors ==
Individual

- Revelations Cup Top Scorer: 2022 (shared)
- Liga MX All-Star: 2026
- Liga MX Best Rookie: 2025–26
