= Robert Turdean =

American soccer player (born 2010)

Personal information
- Date of birth: January 14, 2010 (age 16)
- Place of birth: Niles, Illinois, U.S.
- Height: 5 ft 7 in (1.71 m)
- Position: Midfielder

Team information
- Current team: Chicago Fire FC
- Number: 37

Youth career
- 2021–2025: Chicago Fire

Senior career*
Years	Team	Apps	(Gls)
2025–	Chicago Fire	0	(0)
2025–	Chicago Fire II	28	(5)

International career^{‡}
2023–2025	United States U15	12	(1)
- * Club domestic league appearances and goals as of 23:18, 17 November 2026 (UTC) ‡ National team caps and goals as of July 21, 2025

Robert Turdean (born January 14, 2010) is an American professional soccer player who plays as a midfielder. He signed with the Major League Soccer club Chicago Fire FC as a Homegrown Player through 2028 with club options for 2029 and 2030, as announced on 22 January 2025. His initial contract is the second-most expensive Homegrown contract in MLS history.

On 2 July 2025, it was announced that Turdean had been named to the 2025 MLS Next All-Star Game. Turdean has featured for the U.S. youth national teams but is also eligible for Romania.
