= Leonardo Barroso =

Portuguese footballer (born 2005)

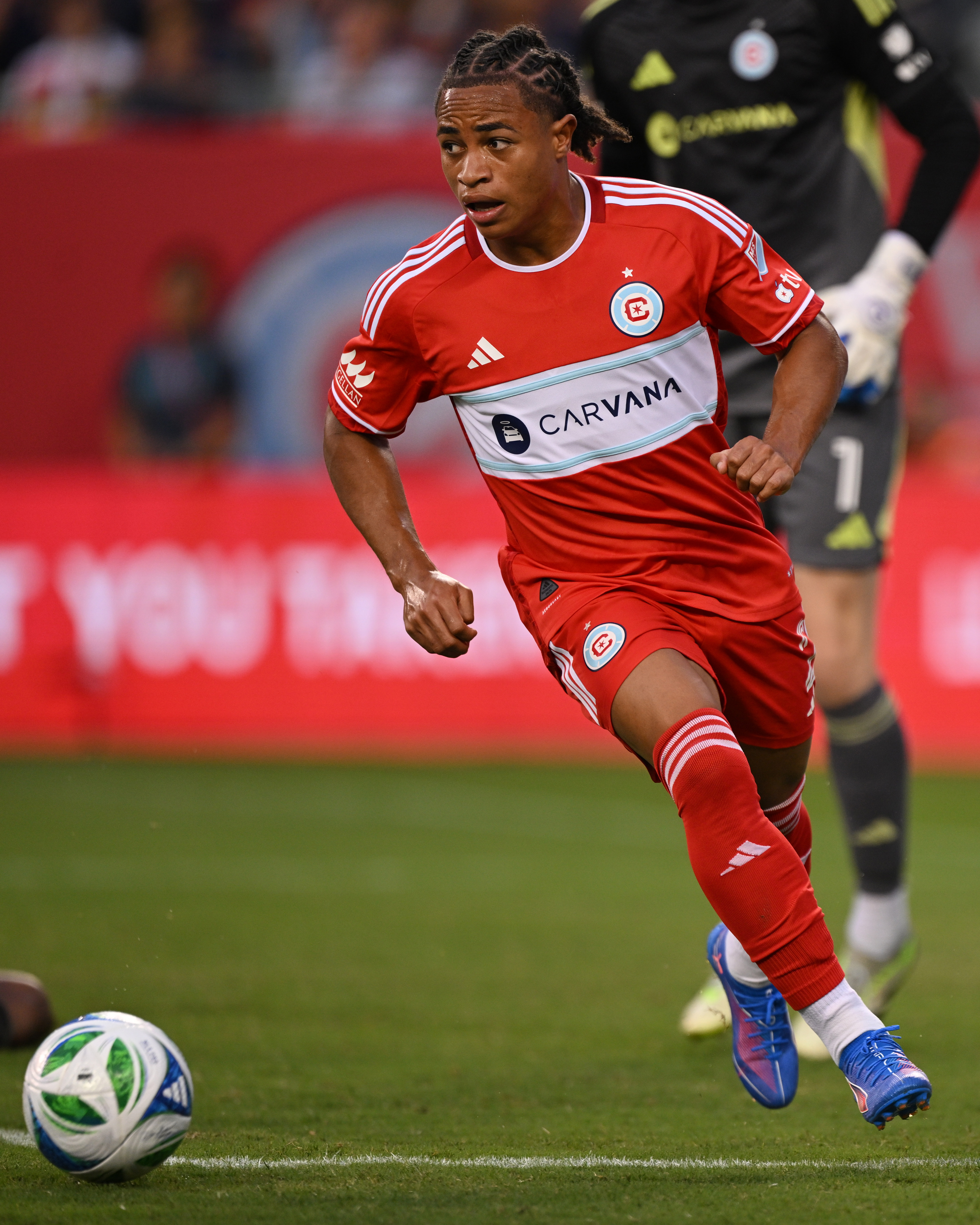
- Chicago Fire FC defender Leonardo Barroso

Personal information
- Full name: Leonardo José Caetano Barroso
- Date of birth: 12 June 2005 (age 21)
- Place of birth: Setúbal, Portugal
- Height: 5 ft 6 in (1.68 m)
- Position: Full-back

Team information
- Current team: Chicago Fire
- Number: 2

Youth career
- –2015: Benfica
- 2015–2025: Sporting CP

Senior career*
Years	Team	Apps	(Gls)
2023–2025	Sporting B	27	(0)
2025–	Chicago Fire	39	(1)

International career
2019	Portugal U15	3	(1)
2021	Portugal U16	3	(0)
2021–2022	Portugal U17	12	(0)
2022–2023	Portugal U18	9	(0)
2023	Portugal U19	2	(1)
2024	Portugal U20	6	(1)
2025–	Portugal U21	1	(1)
- * Club domestic league appearances and goals as of 23:05, 17 November 2026 (UTC)

Leonardo José Caetano Barroso (born 12 June 2005) is a Portuguese professional footballer who plays as a full-back for Major League Soccer club Chicago Fire.

== Club career ==
A full-back, he is a product of the Sporting CP academy having joined Sporting in 2018, from the SL Benfica Academy at the U-15 age level. He featured for the club's first team in pre-season matches prior to the 2023–2024 season. He played for Sporting CP B in Portugal's Liga 3, making 27 appearances.

In January 2025, he signed a four-year contract with the option of an extra year, with Major League Soccer side Chicago Fire.

== International career ==
Born in Portugal, Barroso is of Angolan descent and holds dual Portuguese-Angolan citizenship. He is a Portugal youth international. He was a starting member of the Portugal U17 side which reached the semi-final of the 2022 UEFA European Under-17 Championship, losing on penalties to France U17.
