= Jonathan Dean =

American soccer player (born 1997)

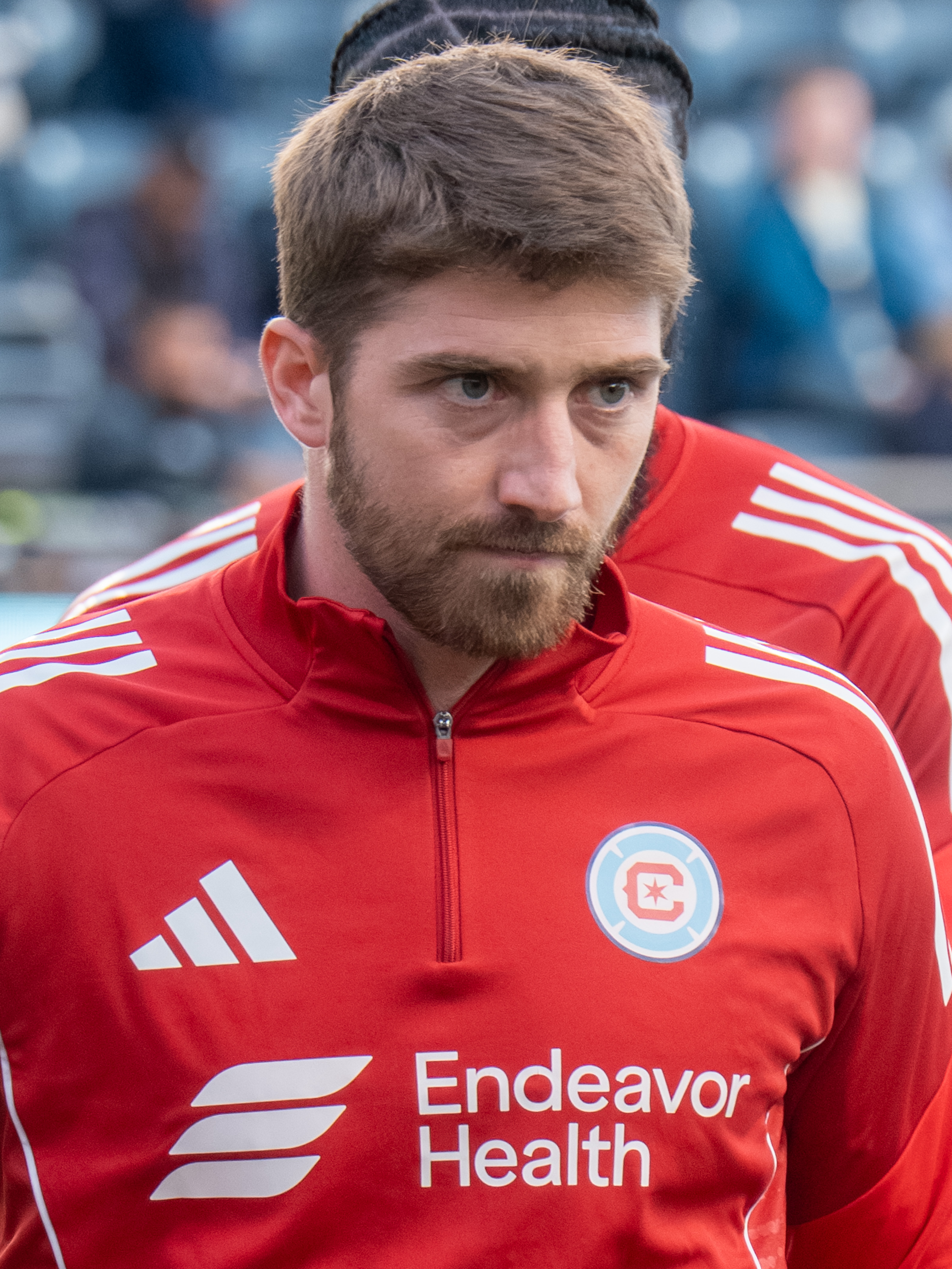
- Dean with the Chicago Fire in 2025

Personal information
- Full name: Jonathan Dean
- Date of birth: May 15, 1997 (age 29)
- Place of birth: Macon, Georgia, U.S.
- Height: 5 ft 8 in (1.73 m)
- Position: Defender

Team information
- Current team: Chicago Fire
- Number: 24

Youth career
- 2012–2013: Stratford Academy
- 2014–2015: Georgia United

College career
Years	Team	Apps	(Gls)
2015	Wofford Terriers	17	(1)
2016–2019	UCF Knights	50	(1)

Senior career*
Years	Team	Apps	(Gls)
2020–2022	Birmingham Legion	81	(4)
2023–	Chicago Fire	104	(2)
2023	Chicago Fire II	2	(0)
- * Club domestic league appearances and goals as of 23:14, 17 November 2026 (UTC)

Jonathan Dean (born May 15, 1997) is an American professional soccer player who plays for Chicago Fire in Major League Soccer.

== Career ==
=== Youth and college ===
Dean played high school soccer at the Stratford Academy, where he won regional and state championships in 2012 and 2013. He also spent time with the USSDA side Georgia United prior to attending college.

Dean began playing college soccer at Wofford College in 2015, making 17 appearances, scoring 1 goal and tallying 5 assists. In 2016, Dean transferred to the University of Central Florida. Here he made 50 appearances, scoring 1 goal and tallying 11 assists. Here in his final year he captained them to a Conference Championship as well as an appearance in the Sweet 16 in the NCAA tournament.

=== Professional ===
On January 9, 2020, Dean was selected 39th overall in the 2020 MLS SuperDraft by Orlando City. However, he was released by the club on February 24, 2020.

Dean signed his first professional contract with USL Championship side Birmingham Legion on February 29, 2020. He made his debut on July 15, 2020, starting in a 3–0 win over Memphis 901.

On January 12, 2023, Dean signed with Major League Soccer side Chicago Fire on a one-year deal.

== Honors ==
Individual

- USL Championship All League Second Team: 2022
