= Sergio Oregel =

American soccer player (born 2005)

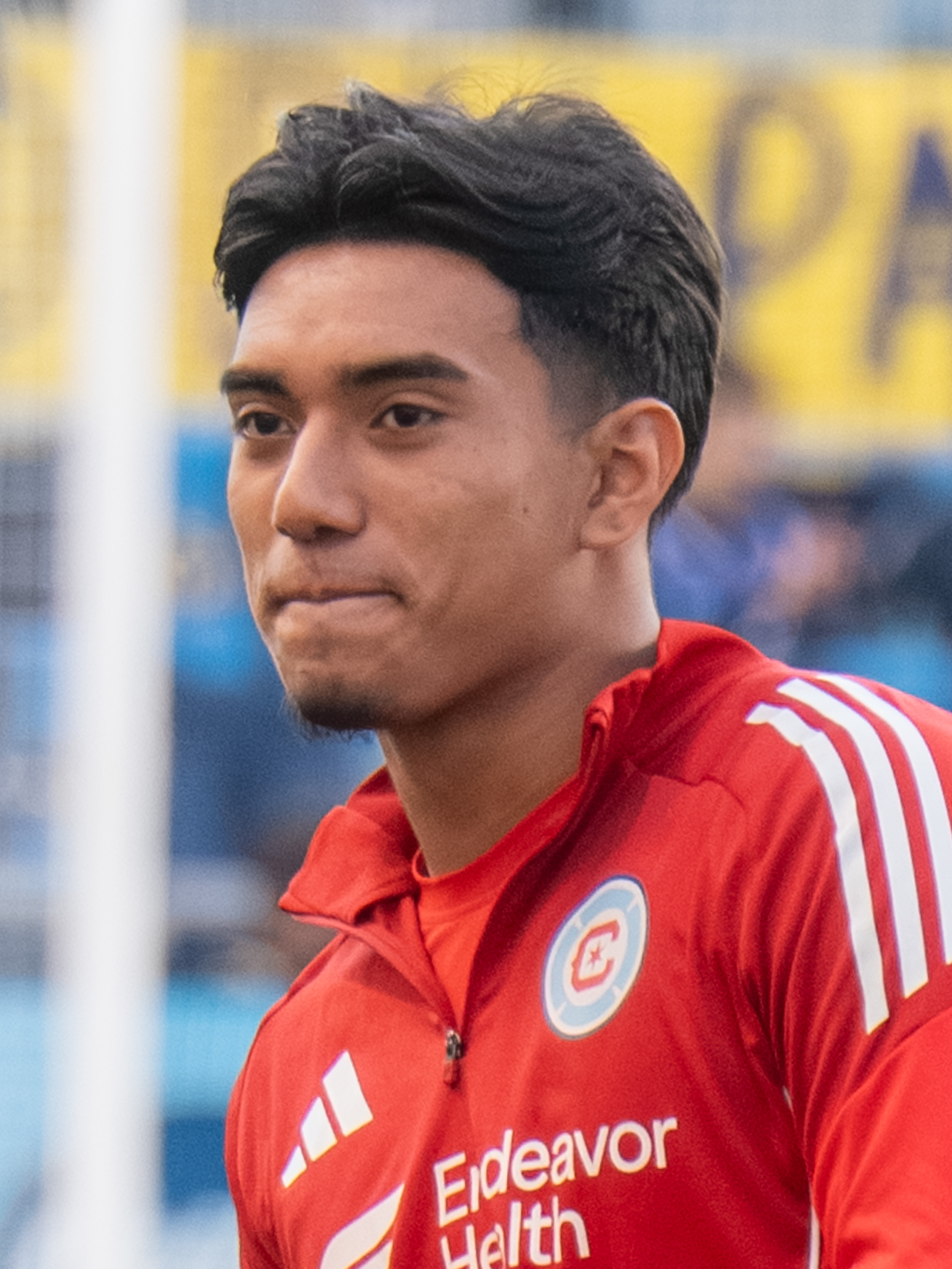
- Oregel with the Chicago Fire in 2025

Personal information
- Full name: Sergio Oregel Jr.
- Date of birth: May 16, 2005 (age 21)
- Place of birth: Evergreen Park, Illinois, U.S.
- Height: 5 ft 9 in (1.75 m)
- Position: Midfielder

Team information
- Current team: Chicago Fire
- Number: 35

Youth career
- 2018–2022: Chicago Fire

Senior career*
Years	Team	Apps	(Gls)
2022–	Chicago Fire	40	(0)
2022–2024	Chicago Fire II	61	(4)

International career^{‡}
2019	United States U15	3	(0)
2022	United States U17	1	(1)
2022–	United States U19	6	(3)
2024–	United States U20	6	(0)
2023–	United States U23	4	(0)
Medal record
Men's football
Representing United States
CONCACAF U-20 Championship
Runner-up	2024 Mexico
- * Club domestic league appearances and goals as of 23:18, 17 November 2026 (UTC) ‡ National team caps and goals as of October 12, 2024

Sergio Oregel Jr. (born May 16, 2005) is an American professional soccer player who plays as a midfielder for Major League Soccer club Chicago Fire.

== Club career ==
=== Youth ===
Oregel joined the academy in 2018. In his final season with the academy in 2021, Oregel helped the team win the inaugural MLS NEXT under-19 Championship on July 3. Oregel earned the MLS NEXT U-19 Golden Ball, which is awarded to the best player of the tournament in each age division.

=== Chicago Fire ===
On October 23, 2021, it was announced that Oregel had signed a homegrown player deal with the Chicago Fire senior team, on a deal that would begin in 2022. In 2022, Oregel spent the majority of the season with the club's MLS Next Pro side, where he made 17 appearances.

== International career ==
Born in the United States, Oregel is of Mexican descent. He is a youth international for the United States, having played up to the United States U-20s. He also appeared in the 2023 Pan American Games, finishing 4th overall with the U.S.
