= Bryan Dowd =

American soccer player (born 2002)

Personal information
- Date of birth: March 8, 2002 (age 24)
- Place of birth: Willow Springs, Illinois, U.S.
- Height: 6 ft 3 in (1.91 m)
- Position: Goalkeeper

Team information
- Current team: Colorado Rapids 2
- Number: 61

Youth career
- Chicago Fire FC
- Chicago FC United

College career
Years	Team	Apps	(Gls)
2020–2023	Notre Dame Fighting Irish	61	(0)

Senior career*
Years	Team	Apps	(Gls)
2019–2022	Chicago FC United	11	(0)
2024–2025	Chicago Fire	0	(0)
2024–2025	→ Chicago Fire II (loan)	0	(0)
2024	→ Huntsville City (loan)	7	(0)
2024	→ Nashville SC (loan)	0	(0)
2025	→ FC Tulsa (loan)	2	(0)
2026	FC Cincinnati 2	5	(0)
2026–	Colorado Rapids 2	4	(0)

International career^{‡}
2019	United States U17	1	(0)
- * Club domestic league appearances and goals as of September 15, 2026 ‡ National team caps and goals as of November 16, 2019

Bryan James Dowd (born March 8, 2002) is an American professional soccer player who plays as a goalkeeper for MLS Next Pro side Colorado Rapids 2.

== Early life ==
Dowd joined the Chicago Fire FC Academy at age ten, later joining Chicago FC United when he was in high school. He attended Fenwick High School, where he played varsity football.

== College career ==
In 2020, he began attending the University of Notre Dame, where he played for the men's soccer team. On March 16, 2021, he made his collegiate debut, recording a clean sheet, against the Calvin Knights.

During the 2021 fall season, he faced four penalty kicks in the season, saving each one, including all three shots he faced in the shootout during the ACC quarter-finals. He was then named to the 2021 All-Tournament Team as Notre Dame won the ACC title.

On September 19, 2023, he made a career high 12 saves in a 0–0 draw with the Akron Zips. He helped them win the ACC regular season title, but they were defeated in the Tournament Final, but still advanced to the national tournament.

At the end of his senior season in 2023, he was named to the All-ACC First Team, the NCAA College Cup All-Tournament Team, the All-America First Team, the TopDrawerSoccer Best XI and was named the ACC Goalkeeper of the Year, TopDrawerSoccer National Player of the Year, and a Hermann Trophy semi-finalist.

In April 2022, he also joined the Notre Dame football team as the third-string punter, when the school was short of kickers during their spring preseason. However, he never took a snap in a game, due to NCAA rules on sports scholarship players. He had initially been offered a spot on the team as a freshman, but was told he would have to join the team as a full-time player, rather than to be a dual sport athlete. Upon coach Marcus Freeman taking over, he was invited to join the team as a reserve punter, while continuing on the soccer team, and was able to play in the school's Blue-Gold intrasquad spring games.

== Club career ==
He played with Chicago FC United in USL League Two, beginning in 2019. In the summer of 2023, he was able to train with some Major League Soccer teams.

At the 2024 MLS SuperDraft, Dowd was selected in the first round (sixth overall) by Chicago Fire FC. In January 2024, he signed a professional contract with the club.

In late June 2024, he was loaned to Huntsville City FC for the remainder of the season. As part of the loan agreement, Nashville SC, the Major League Soccer parent club of Huntsville, maintains the option to make the move permanent and acquire Dowd via trade at the end of the loan. He also made a few bench appearances for Nashville in 2024.

== International career ==
Dowd played with the United States U17 and was named to the preliminary roster for the 2019 FIFA U-17 World Cup.

== Career statistics ==
As of match played October 21, 2023

Club	Season	League			Playoffs		National Cup		Other		Total	
Club	Season	Division	Apps	Goals	Apps	Goals	Apps	Goals	Apps	Goals	Apps	Goals
Chicago FC United	2019	USL League Two	2	0	0	0	—		—		2	0
Chicago FC United	2021	USL League Two	6	0	0	0	—		—		6	0
Chicago FC United	2022	USL League Two	3	0	1	0	0	0	—		4	0
Chicago FC United	Total		11	0	1	0	0	0	0	0	12	0
Career total			11	0	1	0	0	0	0	0	12	0
