= Jeffrey Gal =

Polish-American soccer player (born 1993)

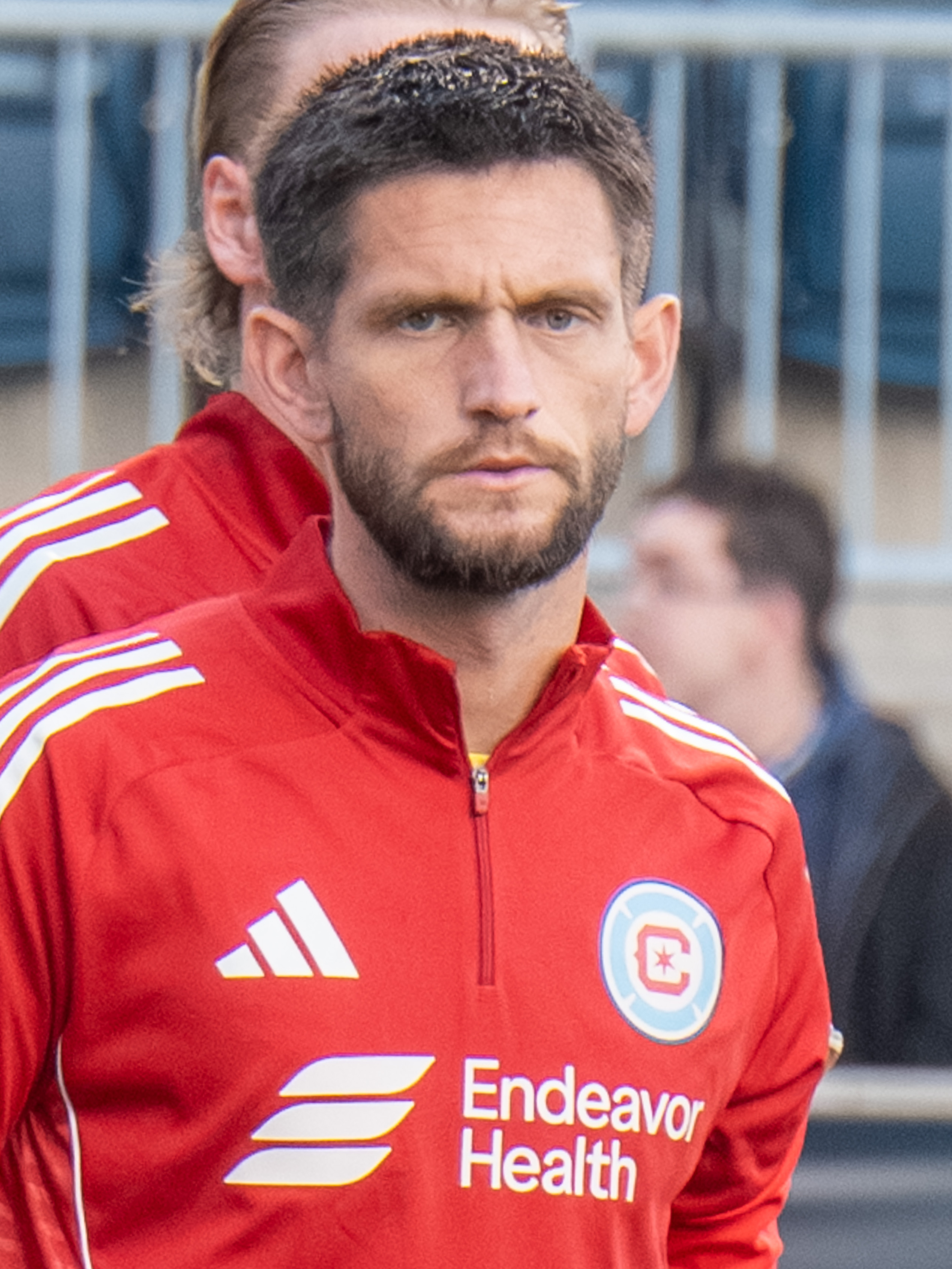
- Gal with the Chicago Fire in 2025

Personal information
- Full name: Jeffrey Joseph Gal
- Date of birth: April 6, 1993 (age 33)
- Place of birth: Chicago, Illinois, U.S.
- Height: 6 ft 2 in (1.88 m)
- Position: Goalkeeper

Team information
- Current team: Chicago Fire
- Number: 25

College career
Years	Team	Apps	(Gls)
2011–2012	Creighton Bluejays		
2013	Virginia Cavaliers		

Senior career*
Years	Team	Apps	(Gls)
2016–2017	Lidköping		
2017–2018	Forward	29	(0)
2019	Skövde	16	(0)
2019–2022	Degerfors	23	(0)
2023–	Chicago Fire	7	(0)
2023–	→ Chicago Fire II (loan)	20	(0)
- * Club domestic league appearances and goals as of July 19, 2025

Jeffrey Joseph Gal (born April 6, 1993) is a Polish-American professional soccer player who plays as a goalkeeper for Major League Soccer club Chicago Fire.
