= Justin Reynolds (soccer) =

American soccer player (born 2004)

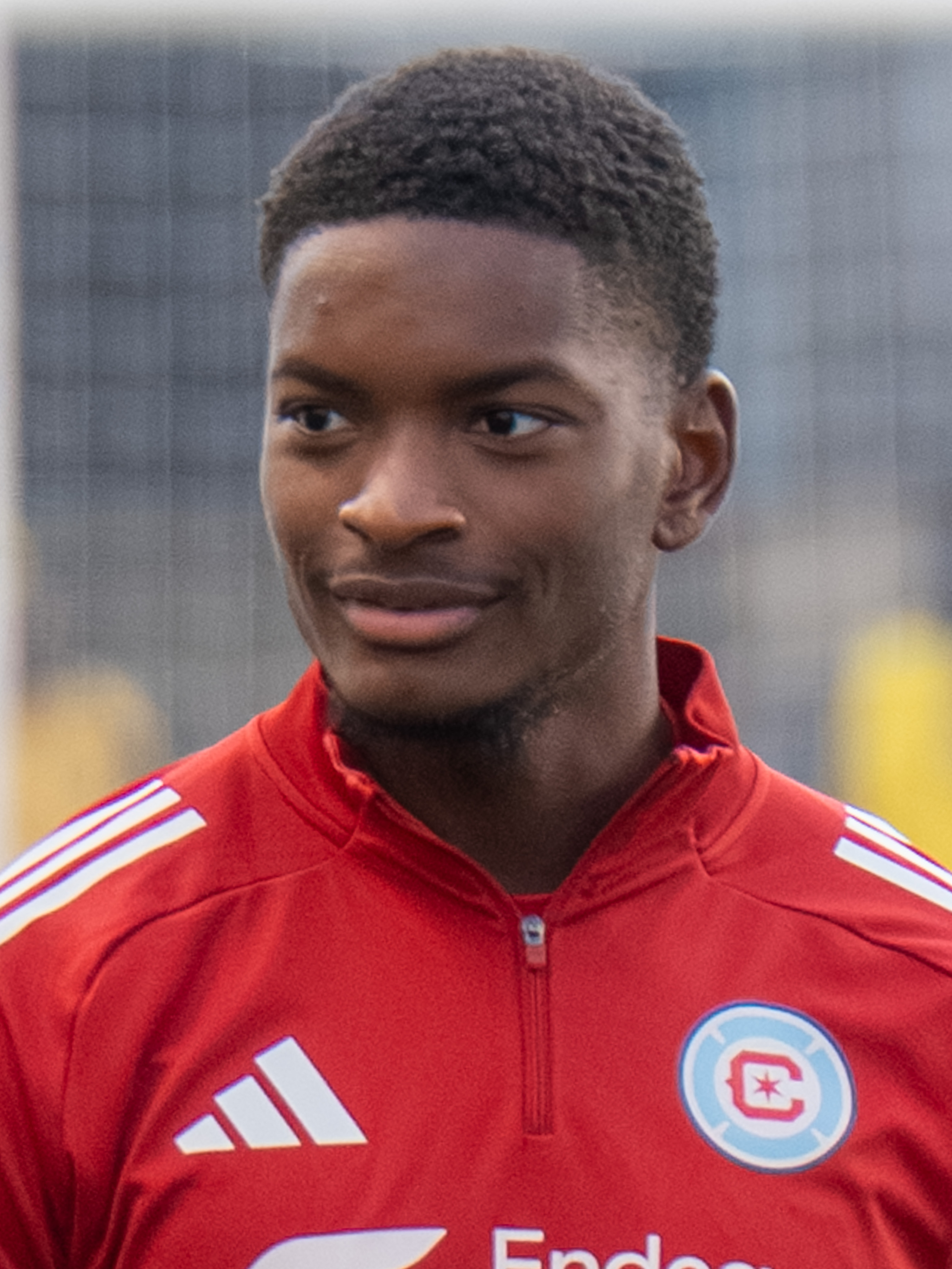
- Reynolds in 2025

Personal information
- Date of birth: August 4, 2004 (age 22)
- Place of birth: Chicago, Illinois, United States
- Height: 1.75 m (5 ft 9 in)
- Position: Defender

Team information
- Current team: Sporting Kansas City
- Number: 13

Youth career
- 2014–2022: Chicago Fire

Senior career*
Years	Team	Apps	(Gls)
2022–2025	Chicago Fire II	62	(3)
2023–2025	Chicago Fire	12	(1)
2024	→ Lugano (loan)	1	(0)
2026–	Sporting Kansas City	8	(0)

International career^{‡}
2019	United States U15	2	(0)
2022	United States U17	0	(0)
- * Club domestic league appearances and goals as of August 17, 2026 ‡ National team caps and goals as of 02:00, November 27, 2025 (UTC)

Justin Reynolds (born August 4, 2004) is an American professional soccer player who plays as a defender for Major League Soccer club Sporting Kansas City.

== Youth career ==
Reynolds was an academy player for the Fire since 2014, where his brother Andre played before being signed to a homegrown contract with the first team in 2018. While with the academy, Reynolds would help the U-19 side win the 2021 MLS Next U-19 Championship.

== Club career ==
After joining the Fire's second team in 2022, Reynolds was signed to a first-team Homegrown deal on May 12 of the same year. His contract wouldn't start until the 2023 season. Reynolds would finish out the season at Fire II making 14 appearances. Reynolds would not appear with the first team in 2023, appearing on the bench only twice that season. Following this, he was loaned to the Fire's sister club Lugano in Switzerland on March 12, 2024, for the remainder of Lugano's season. There he would make only one appearance, subbing on for 22 minutes in the final game against Servette.

Following his return from Lugano, Reynolds made his first team debut on July 20, coming on for four minutes against Miami. He'd start his first game on August 1 in the Leagues Cup against Mexican side Toluca.

On September 30, 2025, Reynolds would score his first goal for the first team, notching the game-winner over Inter Miami in a 5–3 victory that saw the Fire qualify for their first playoffs since 2017.
