= 2026 Chicago Fire FC season =

Chicago Fire FC
2026 season
- Owner: Joe Mansueto
- Head coach: Gregg Berhalter
- Stadium: Soldier Field (capacity: 61,500); SeatGeek Stadium (secondary stadium) (capacity: 20,000)
- Open Cup: Round of 16
- Leagues Cup: Quarterfinals
- Top goalscorer: League: Hugo Cuypers (13); All: Hugo Cuypers (13)
- Highest home attendance: 63,094, September 9 vs Inter Miami CF
- Lowest home attendance: 15,392, April 4 vs Nashville SC
- Average home league attendance: 19,600
- Biggest win: 5–0 vs Sporting Kansas City, April 25
- Biggest defeat: 0–3 vs Nashville SC, September 19
Home colors	Away colors	Third colors

The 2026 Chicago Fire FC season is the club's 29th season in Major League Soccer. The season is the seventh season under owner Joe Mansueto, and the second with Gregg Berhalter as head coach.

== Current squad ==
Players signed as of November 1, 2025

No.	Name	Date of birth (age)	Date Joined	Previous club	Player Notes
Goalkeepers
1	(United States) Chris Brady	March 3, 2004 (aged 22)	March 24, 2020	(United States) Chicago Fire Academy	Homegrown
25	(United States) Jeff Gal	April 6, 1993 (aged 33)	January 11, 2023	(Sweden) Degerfors IF	
44	(United States) Josh Cohen	August 19, 1992 (aged 34)	December 31, 2025	(United States) Atlanta United	
Defenders
2	(Portugal) Leonardo Barroso	June 16, 2005 (aged 21)	January 14, 2025	(Portugal) Sporting CP B	International; U-22
3	(England) Jack Elliott	August 25, 1995 (aged 31)	December 16, 2024	(United States) Philadelphia Union	TAM
4	(South Africa) Mbekezeli Mbokazi	September 19, 2005 (aged 21)	December 2, 2025	(South Africa) Orlando Pirates F.C.	International; U-22
5	(United States) Sam Rogers	May 17, 1999 (aged 27)	January 13, 2025	(Norway) Lillestrøm SK	
15	(United States) Andrew Gutman	October 2, 1996 (aged 30)	December 12, 2023	(United States) Colorado Rapids	
21	(Norway) Andreas Hanche-Olsen	January 17, 1997 (aged 29)	September 1, 2026	(Germany) Mainz 05	International; TAM
24	(United States) Jonathan Dean	May 15, 1997 (aged 29)	January 12, 2023	(United States) Birmingham Legion FC	
32	(Greece) Noah Allen	April 28, 2004 (aged 22)	September 3, 2026	(United States) Inter Miami	Loaned In; U-22
Midfielders
6	(Sweden) Anton Salétros	April 12, 1996 (aged 30)	November 7, 2025	(Sweden) AIK	International; TAM
7	(Switzerland) Maren Haile-Selassie	March 13, 1999 (aged 27)	December 27, 2022	(Switzerland) FC Lugano	International
10	(Portugal) André Franco	April 12, 1998 (aged 28)	August 13, 2025	(Portugal) FC Porto	International; TAM
11	(Denmark) Philip Zinckernagel	December 16, 1994 (age 31)	January 6, 2025	(Belgium) Club Brugge KV	International; DP
17	(Finland) Robin Lod	April 17, 1993 (aged 33)	December 26, 2025	(United States) Minnesota United	TAM
19	(Ivory Coast) Jonathan Bamba	March 26, 1996 (aged 30)	January 21, 2025	(Spain) RC Celta de Vigo	DP; International
22	(United States) Mauricio Pineda	October 17, 1997 (aged 29)	January 17, 2020	(United States) North Carolina Tar Heels	
23	(Georgia (country)) Anzor Mekvabishvili	June 5, 2001 (aged 25)	September 1, 2026	(Romania) Universitatea Craiova	International; TAM
29	(United States) David Poreba	December 1, 2002 (age 23)	December 12, 2024	(United States) Chicago Fire FC II	
35	(United States) Sergio Oregel	May 16, 2005 (aged 21)	October 23, 2021	(United States) Chicago Fire Academy	Homegrown
37	(United States) Robert Turdean	January 14, 2010 (aged 16)	January 22, 2025	(United States) Chicago Fire Academy	Off-Roster Homegrown
42	(Ivory Coast) Djé D'Avilla	May 5, 2003 (aged 23)	April 1, 2025	(Portugal) U.D. Leiria	International; U-22
Forwards
9	(Poland) Robert Lewandowski	August 21, 1988 (aged 38)	June 29, 2026	(Spain) FC Barcelona	International; Designated Player
12	(South Africa) Puso Dithejane	June 24, 2004 (aged 22)	January 13, 2026	(South Africa) TS Galaxy F.C.	International; U-22
18	(United States) Johan Gómez	July 23, 2001 (aged 25)	September 2, 2026	(Germany) Eintracht Braunschweig	
28	(United States) Dean Boltz	June 7, 2006 (aged 20)	December 20, 2024	(United States) University of Wisconsin	

=== Loaned Out ===
No.	Name	Date of birth (age)	Date Joined	Loaned To
14	(Serbia) Viktor Radojević	July 14, 2004 (aged 22)	August 22, 2025	(Canada) CF Montréal
26	(Guyana) Omari Glasgow	November 22, 2003 (age 23)	December 17, 2024	(United States) Monterey Bay FC
27	(United States) Dylan Borso	June 2, 2006 (age 20)	December 20, 2024	(Scotland) Greenock Morton
38	(United States) Christopher Cupps	May 26, 2008 (aged 18)	February 18, 2025	(Scotland) Greenock Morton
47	(United States) Sam Williams	March 18, 2005 (aged 21)	March 14, 2025	(United States) Colorado Springs Switchbacks FC

=== Temporary Players ===
Below are players that joined the Fire from Fire II on short-term loans during the season. Players are allowed to be called up to four games and cannot play in more than two games.

No.	Name	Position	Date of birth (age)	Games Joined For
30	(United States) Jack Sandmeyer	Defender	October 8, 2002 (aged 24)	March 21 vs Philadelphia; May 16 vs Montreal
58	(South Africa) Brody Williams	Midfielder	March 4, 2010 (aged 16)	September 26 vs Charlotte
65	(Mexico) Oscar Pineda	Midfielder	July 29, 2008 (aged 18)	September 26 vs Charlotte

== Player movement ==
=== Returning, options, and new contracts ===
Date	Player	Position	Notes	Ref
November 26, 2025	(England) Jack Elliott	DF	Option exercised	
November 26, 2025	(United States) David Poreba	MF	Signed to a new contract for 2026 with options for 2027 and 2028	
November 26, 2025	(United States) Sam Williams	MF	Option exercised	
January 1, 2025	(Guyana) Omari Glasgow	MF	Returned from loan to Loudoun United FC	
August 15, 2026	(United States) Andrew Gutman	DF	Signed to a new contract through the 2028-2029 season	
August 18, 2026	(United States) Sam Williams	MF	Temporarilly ecalled from the Colorado Springs Switchbacks before returning following the September 5th match against Toronto	
September 2, 2026	(Denmark) Philip Zinckernagel	MF	Signed to a new DP contract through the 2027-2028 season	
September 17, 2026	(England) Jack Elliott	DF	Signed to a new contract through the 2027-2028 season with an option for 2028-2029	
October 9, 2026	(Switzerland) Maren Haile-Selassie	MF	Signed to a new contract through the 2028-2029 season	

=== In ===
Date	Player	Position	Previous club	Notes	Ref
November 7, 2025	(Sweden) Anton Salétros	MF	(Sweden) AIK	Transferred from AIK on a contract through 2028	
November 7, 2025	(Portugal) André Franco	MF	(Portugal) FC Porto	Acquired from Porto permanently after a successful loan stint on a contract that runs through the middle of 2028 with an option for the remainder of the year	
December 2, 2025	(South Africa) Mbekezeli Mbokazi	DF	(South Africa) Orlando Pirates F.C.	Acquired as a U-22 initiative player from Orlando on a contract that runs through 2029 with an option for the 2029/2030 season.	
December 10, 2025	(United States) Jason Shokalook	FW	(United States) Chicago Fire FC II	Promoted from the second team after winning the 2025 MLS Next Pro golden boot, signing a contract for 2026 with options for 2027 and 2028	
December 26, 2025	(Finland) Robin Lod	MF	(United States) Minnesota United	Joined the Fire as a free agent with a contract through the summer of 2008	
December 31, 2025	(United States) Josh Cohen	GK	(United States) Atlanta United	Joined the Fire as a free agent through the summer of 2027 with an option for the 2027-2028 season	
January 13, 2026	(South Africa) Puso Dithejane	FW	(South Africa) TS Galaxy F.C.	Joined from Galaxy as a U-22 initiative player through the 2029-2030 season with an option for the 2030-2031 season	
June 29, 2026	(Poland) Robert Lewandowski	FW	(Spain) FC Barcelona	Joined as a DP free agent on a contract through the end of the 2027-2028 season	
September 1, 2026	(Georgia (country)) Anzor Mekvabishvili	MF	(Romania) Universitatea Craiova	Joined on a TAM deal through the 2028-2029 season with an option for 2029-2030	
September 1, 2026	(Norway) Andreas Hanche-Olsen	DF	(Germany) Mainz 05	Joined on a TAM deal through the 2030-2031 season	
September 2, 2026	(United States) Johan Gómez	FW	(Germany) Eintracht Braunschweig	Joined on a transfer through the 2028-2029 season with an option for 2029-2030	

=== Loaned In ===
Date	Player	Position	Loaning Club	Notes	Ref
September 3, 2026	(Greece) Noah Allen	DF	(United States) Inter Miami	Loaned in on a U-22 deal with a permanent trade option	

=== Out ===
Date	Player	Position	Destination Club	Notes	Ref
November 26, 2025	(United States) Omar Gonzalez	DF	(United States) Chicago Fire FC II	Joined the Fire's second team as an assistant player-coach	
November 26, 2025	(United States) Tom Barlow	FW	(United States) FC Cincinnati	Option declined	
November 26, 2025	(United States) Bryan Dowd	GK	(United States) FC Cincinnati 2	Option declined	
November 26, 2025	(United States) Chase Gasper	DF	Retired	Out of contract, and subsequently retired	
November 26, 2025	(Mali) Rominigue Kouamé	MF	(Spain) Cádiz CF	End of loan	
December 12, 2025	(United States) Brian Gutiérrez	MF	(Mexico) Chivas	Transferred to Chivas for a multi-million-dollar fee with a future sell-on percentage	
December 13, 2025	(Greece) Georgios Koutsias	FW	(Switzerland) FC Lugano	Formally transferred to Lugano after being on loan to them for the previous year	
December 30, 2025	(United States) Justin Reynolds	DF	(United States) Sporting Kansas City	Transferred to SKC for up to $100k in GAM, SKC's natural third round draft pick in the 2028 SuperDraft, and a potential future sell-on fee if Reynolds is sold to a non-MLS side	
January 14, 2026	(United States) Kellyn Acosta	MF	(Poland) Pogoń Szczecin	Acosta and the Fire mutually agreed to part ways	
July 23, 2026	(Belgium) Hugo Cuypers	FW	(Mexico) CF Monterrey	Transferred to Monterrey for a multi-million dollar fee	
September 2, 2026	(United States) Jason Shokalook	FW	(United States) Real Salt Lake	Transferred to RSL in exchange for $150,000 in GAM over 2026 and 2027 with an additional $50,000 if certain performance metrics are met	
September 3, 2026	(Canada) Joel Waterman	DF	(United States) Portland Timbers	Transferred to Portland in exchange for $100,000 in GAM, a future sell and trade percentage, and an additional $100,000 if certain performance metrics are met	
September 4, 2026	(United States) Chris Mueller	MF	Retired	Formally announced his retirement after suffering from pericarditis over the last two years	

=== Loaned Out ===
Date	Player	Position	Destination Club	Notes	Ref
February 13, 2026	(United States) Sam Williams	MF	(United States) Colorado Springs Switchbacks FC	Loaned for the season	
February 13, 2026	(Guyana) Omari Glasgow	MF	(United States) Monterey Bay FC	Loaned for the season	
August 24, 2026	(United States) Christopher Cupps	DF	(Scotland) Greenock Morton	Loaned through the end of 2026	
September 2, 2026	(Serbia) Viktor Radojević	DF	(Canada) CF Montréal	Loaned through the end of 2026 with an option for an additional six months	
September 3, 2026	(United States) Dylan Borso	DF	(Scotland) Greenock Morton	Loaned through the end of 2026	

=== Unsigned draft pick ===
	Player	Position	Previous club	Notes	Ref
R1, P18	(United States) Jack Sandmeyer	DF/MF	(United States) UNC	Signed with the second team	

== Technical staff ==
Position	Staff
Head Coach and Director of Football	(United States) Gregg Berhalter
Assistant Coach	(Spain) Nico Estévez
Assistant Coach	(United States) Tom Heinemann
Assistant Coach	(United States) Hector Jiménez
Goalkeeping Coach	(United States) Zach Thornton
Assistant Goalkeeping Coach	(United States) Joe Bendik
Set Piece Coach	(England) Ryan Needs
Sporting Director	(England) Gregg Broughton
Head of Player Recruitment	(United States) Michael Stephens
Director of Performance	(Canada) Darcy Norman
Head of Strategy	(United States) Eddie Rock
General Manager	(United States) Zayne Thomajan
Director of Methodology; Talent Manager	(Switzerland) Vincent Cavin

Last updated: January 8, 2025
Source: Chicago Fire Technical Staff

== Non-competitive matches ==
=== Preseason ===
For the third consecutive season, the Fire participated in the Coachella Valley Invitational. Prior to this they travelled to West Palm Beach in Florida for a week of training.

January 20	Chicago Fire FC	4–1	Nashville SC	West Palm Beach, Florida
	Poreba; Salétros; Zinckernagel (o.g.) Applewhite		Brunet

January 24	Chicago Fire FC	1–0	Sporting Kansas City	West Palm Beach, Florida
	Bamba

February 8 CVI	Chicago Fire	3–2	LA Galaxy	Indio, California
	Cuypers 30'; Zinckernagel 38'; Mueller 84'	Report	Pec 51', 77'	Stadium: Empire Polo Club; Referee: Ricardo Fierro

February 11 CVI	Chicago Fire	2–2	Austin FC	Indio, California
	Gutman 12'; Elliott 82'	Report	Taylor 27'; Nelson 65'	Stadium: Empire Polo Club; Referee: Muhammad Kaleia

February 14 CVI	Chicago Fire	3–4	Portland Timbers	Indio, California
	Lod 41'; Mueller 63'; Haile-Selassie 87'	Report	Antony 47'; Guerra 56'; Mora 75', 90+1'	Stadium: Empire Polo Club; Referee: Alexis Da Silva

== Competitions ==
=== Major League Soccer ===
==== Eastern Conference table ====
MLS Eastern Conference table (2026)
Pos	Team	Pld	W	L	T	GF	GA	GD	Pts	Qualification
1	Nashville SC	34	23	3	8	71	25	+46	77	Qualification for round one and the CONCACAF Champions Cup round one
2	Inter Miami CF	34	16	6	12	80	59	+21	60	Qualification for round one
3	New England Revolution	34	18	12	4	55	47	+8	58	Qualification for round one
4	Chicago Fire FC	34	16	11	7	64	54	+10	55	Qualification for round one
5	Charlotte FC	34	15	10	9	66	51	+15	54	Qualification for round one
6	Philadelphia Union	34	14	12	8	66	52	+14	50	Qualification for round one
7	Columbus Crew	34	14	15	5	59	52	+7	47	Qualification for round one
8	Orlando City SC	34	13	14	7	63	78	−15	46	Qualification for the wild card round
9	FC Cincinnati	34	12	12	10	67	75	−8	46	Qualification for the wild card round
10	New York Red Bulls	34	12	16	6	48	62	−14	42	
11	New York City FC	34	10	12	12	49	45	+4	42	
12	Toronto FC	34	9	13	12	52	67	−15	39	
13	Atlanta United FC	34	9	19	6	43	60	−17	33	
14	D.C. United	34	7	15	12	39	61	−22	33	
15	CF Montréal	34	6	20	8	37	69	−32	26	

Source: MLS
Rules for classification: 1) points; 2) total wins; 3) total goal differential; 4) total goals scored; 5) fewer disciplinary points; 6) away goal differential; 7) away goals scored; 8) home goals differential; 9) home goals scored; 10) coin toss (2 clubs tied) or drawing of lots (≥3 clubs tied)

==== Overall table ====
Overall MLS standings table
Pos	Team	Pld	W	L	T	GF	GA	GD	Pts	Qualification
4	New England Revolution	34	18	12	4	55	47	+8	58	Qualification for the CONCACAF Champions Cup round one (Note: As one of the next two highest-ranked clubs in 2026 MLS Supporters' Shield not already qualified)
5	FC Dallas	34	16	8	10	62	51	+11	58	
6	Chicago Fire FC	34	16	11	7	64	54	+10	55	
7	Charlotte FC	34	15	10	9	66	51	+15	54	
8	St. Louis City SC (U)	34	15	10	9	59	48	+11	54	Qualification for the CONCACAF Champions Cup round one (Note: As winners of U.S. Open Cup)

Source: MLS
Rules for classification: 1) points; 2) total wins; 3) total goal differential; 4) total goals scored; 5) fewer disciplinary points; 6) away goal differential; 7) away goals scored; 8) home goals differential; 9) home goals scored; 10) coin toss (2 clubs tied) or drawing of lots (≥3 clubs tied)
(U) U.S. Open Cup winners

==== Results summary ====
Overall								Home						Away					
Pld	Pts	W	L	T	GF	GA	GD	W	L	T	GF	GA	GD	W	L	T	GF	GA	GD
34	55	16	11	7	67	55	+12	9	6	2	36	26	+10	7	5	5	31	29	+2

Last updated: Complete
Source: MLSsoccer.com standings
Pld = Matches played; Pts = Points; W = Matches won; T = Matches tied; L = Matches lost; GF = Goals for; GA = Goals against; GD = Goal difference

==== Match results ====
February 21 1	Houston Dynamo FC	2–1	Chicago Fire FC	Houston, Texas
7:30 PM	(yellow card) 13' Holmes; 67', 78' Guilherme; (yellow card) 85' Sviatchenko	Report	(yellow card) 26' Waterman; 31' Cuypers; (yellow card) 84' Mueller	Stadium: Shell Energy Stadium; Attendance: 20,068; Referee: Filip Dujic

February 28 2	Chicago Fire FC	3–0	CF Montréal	Chicago, Illinois
1:30 PM	27' Bamba; (yellow card) 44' Zinckernagel; (red card) 56' Dean; 90+4' (pen.) Cuypers; 90+10' Lod	Report	(yellow card) 30' Vera; (yellow card) 53' Jaime; (yellow card) 90+2' Gillier	Stadium: Soldier Field; Attendance: 20,872; Referee: Elijio Arreguin

March 7 3	Columbus Crew	0–0	Chicago Fire FC	Columbus, Ohio
6:30 PM	(yellow card) 14' Arfsten; (yellow card) 87' Zawadzki	Report	(yellow card) 61' Waterman; (yellow card) 77' Zinckernagel; (yellow card) 83' Salétros; (yellow card) 90' Bamba	Stadium: ScottsMiracle-Gro Field; Attendance: 20,121; Referee: Tori Penso

March 14 4	Chicago Fire FC	1–2	D.C. United	Chicago, Illinois
7:30 PM	(yellow card) 24' Zinckernagel; (yellow card) 54' D'Avilla; (yellow card) 57' Elliott; 81' (pen.) Cuypers	Report	(yellow card) 34' Hopkins; 84' Peltola; 90+5' (pen.) Baribo	Stadium: Soldier Field; Attendance: 15,845; Referee: Sergii Demianchuk

March 21 5	Philadelphia Union	1–2	Chicago Fire FC	Chester, Pennsylvania
3:30 PM	(yellow card) 37' Ndinga; 50+7' Iloski	Report	(yellow card) 8' Lod; (yellow card) 23' D'Avilla; 45+3' Cuypers; 58' Bamba; (yellow card) 87' Radojević	Stadium: Subaru Park; Attendance: 18,753; Referee: Nabil Bensalah

April 4 6	Chicago Fire FC	1–0	Nashville SC	Chicago, Illinois
7:30 PM	1' Zinckernagel; (yellow card) 72' Salétros; (yellow card) 78' D'Avilla	Report	(yellow card) 80' Tagseth	Stadium: Soldier Field; Attendance: 15,392; Referee: Marcos de Oliveira

April 11 7	Chicago Fire FC	1–0	Atlanta United FC	Chicago, Illinois
7:30 PM	(yellow card) 8' Zinckernagel; 13' Haile-Selassie; (yellow card) 48' Barroso	Report	(yellow card) 3' Jacob	Stadium: Soldier Field; Attendance: 17,764; Referee: Drew Fischer

April 18 8	FC Cincinnati	3–3	Chicago Fire FC	Cincinnati, Ohio
6:30 PM	(yellow card) 7' Gidi; (yellow card) 11', (goal) 42' Barlow; 79' (pen.) Evander; 86' (o.g.) D'Avilla; (yellow card) 90' Ramírez; (yellow card) 90' Bucha	Report	26', 48' Cuypers; 45+5' (pen.) Zinckernagel; (yellow card) 90' Borso; (yellow card) 90+9' Elliott; (yellow card) 90+9' Mbokazi	Stadium: TQL Stadium; Attendance: 25,513; Referee: Malik Badawi

April 25 9	Chicago Fire FC	5–0	Sporting Kansas City	Chicago, Illinois
7:30 PM	(yellow card) 10' Gutman; 51', 65' Zinckernagel; 73', 90+8' Cuypers; 79' Haile-Selassie	Report		Stadium: Soldier Field; Attendance: 17,892; Referee: Brandon Stevis

May 2 10	Chicago Fire FC	2–3	FC Cincinnati	Chicago, Illinois
7:30 PM	16', 28' Cuypers; (yellow card) 90+3' D'Avilla	Report	24', 31', 90+7' (pen.) Evander; (red card) 56' Smith; (yellow card) 68' Denkey; (yellow card) 90' Lajhar; (yellow card) 90+12' Chirila	Stadium: Soldier Field; Attendance: 18,639; Referee: Joe Dickerson

May 9 11	Chicago Fire FC	1–3	New York Red Bulls	Chicago, Illinois
1:30 PM	(yellow card) 81' Haile-Selassie; 87' Cuypers	Report	(yellow card) 18' Voloder; 45', (yellow card) 81' Ruvalcaba; 49'Cowell; 81' (pen.) Choupo-Moting; (yellow card) 90+6' Valencia	Stadium: Soldier Field; Attendance: 23,647; Referee: Allen Chapman

May 13 12	D.C. United	1–3	Chicago Fire FC	Washington, D.C.
6:30 PM	41' Baribo	Report	(yellow card) 19' D'Avilla; (yellow card) 48' Bamba; 62' Lod; 71' Cuypers; (yellow card) 75' Elliott; 87' Haile-Selassie; (yellow card) 89' Dean; (yellow card) 90+6' Gutman	Stadium: Audi Field; Attendance: 11,243; Referee: Ricardo Fierro

May 16 13	CF Montréal	0–2	Chicago Fire FC	Montreal, Quebec
6:30 PM	(yellow card) 36' Piette; (yellow card) 63' Craig; (yellow card) 72' Owusu; (yellow card) 82' Vera	Report	(yellow card) 6' Radojević; 14' Zinckernagel; (yellow card) 57' Mbokazi; 67' Cuypers; (yellow card) 89' Dithejane	Stadium: Saputo Stadium; Attendance: 16,018; Referee: Fotis Bazakos

May 23 14	Chicago Fire FC	2–1	Toronto FC	Chicago, Illinois
7:30 PM	22' Lod; (yellow card) 40' Cuypers; (yellow card) 60', (goal) 65' Gutman; (yellow card) 87' Salétros; (yellow card) 90+1' Brady	Report	(yellow card) 14' Henry; 34' Sargent; (yellow card) 90+1' Corbeanu; (yellow card) 90+1' Osorio	Stadium: Soldier Field; Attendance: 26,752; Referee: Sergii Demianchuk

July 22 15	Inter Miami CF	3–2	Chicago Fire FC	Miami, Florida
6:30 PM	27' (pen.), 51' Suárez; 87' Plambeck; (yellow card) 90+7' Reguilón	Report	18' Ríos Novo; (yellow card) 64' Elliott; 67' Dithejane	Stadium: Nu Stadium; Attendance: 25,123; Referee: Rubiel Vazquez

July 25 16	New York City FC	3–1	Chicago Fire FC	New York, New York
6:30 PM	10', (yellow card) 62' Fernández; 29' Ojeda; 41' Jones	Report	21', (yellow card) 77' Waterman; (yellow card) 51' D'Avilla; (yellow card) 80' Dithejane	Stadium: Yankee Stadium; Attendance: 27,419; Referee: Ricardo Montero

August 1 17	Chicago Fire FC	2–1	Charlotte FC	Chicago, Illinois
7:30 PM	Saletros (yellow card) 10'; Lewandowski 20', 68'; Waterman (yellow card) 59'	Report	Biel 18'	Stadium: Soldier Field; Attendance: 32,183; Referee: Jon Freemon

August 16 18	Chicago Fire FC	2–1	Portland Timbers	Chicago, Illinois
5:30 PM	Lod 9', (yellow card) 57'; D'Avilla 14'; Salétros (yellow card) 79'	Report	Bye (yellow card) 51'; Surman 85'; Janssen (yellow card) 90+4'	Stadium: Soldier Field; Attendance: 30,168; Referee: Chris Penso

August 19 19	Orlando City SC	1–2	Chicago Fire FC	Orlando, Florida
6:30 PM	Brekalo 52'; Otávio (yellow card) 57'; Jansson (yellow card) 66'	Report	Dithejane 4'; Lewandowski 68' (pen.); Radojević (yellow card) 80'; Rogers (yellow card) 89'	Stadium: Inter.co Stadium; Attendance: 20,102; Referee: Rosendo Mendoza

August 22 20	New York Red Bulls	1–1	Chicago Fire FC	Harrison, New Jersey
6:30 PM	Sofo (yellow card) 66'; Harper 86'	Report	Barroso (yellow card) 17'; Haile-Selassie 38'; Waterman (yellow card) 64'	Stadium: Sports Illustrated Stadium; Attendance: 25,219; Referee: Sergii Demianchuk

August 29 21	Seattle Sounders FC	2–2	Chicago Fire FC	Seattle, Washington
3:30 PM	Joveljić 12', 48'; Brunell (yellow card) 51'	Report	Haile-Selassie 38'; Lewandowski 82'	Stadium: Lumen Field; Attendance: 38,287; Referee: Ismail Elfath

September 5 22	Toronto FC	4–4	Chicago Fire FC	Toronto, Ontario
6:30 PM	Sargent 27', 38', 54'; Cimermancic (yellow card) 34'; Kuscevic (yellow card) 90'; Etienne 90+2'	Report	Haile-Selassie 13', 58'; Rogers (yellow card) 18'; Zimmerman 49' (o.g.); Lewandowski 63'; Lod (yellow card) 86'	Stadium: BMO Field; Attendance: 26,693; Referee: Tori Penso

September 9 23	Chicago Fire FC	1–1	Inter Miami CF	Chicago, Illinois
7:30 PM	Lewandowski 10'; Dean (yellow card) 50'; D'Avilla (yellow card) 59'	Report	Segovia (yellow card) 4'; Falcón (yellow card) 24'; Casemiro 48'; Berterame (yellow card) 71'	Stadium: Soldier Field; Attendance: 63,094; Referee: Jair Marrufo

September 13 24	Chicago Fire FC	1–2	New England Revolution	Chicago, Illinois
5:30 PM	Allen (yellow card) 43'; Haile-Selassie 62'; Oregel (yellow card) 84'	Report	Turgeman 39'; Miller 47', (yellow card) 58'; Polster (yellow card) 52'	Stadium: Soldier Field; Attendance: 26,324; Referee: Rubiel Vazquez

September 19 25	Nashville SC	3–0	Chicago Fire FC	Nashville, Tennessee
8:30 PM	Surridge 33'; Mukhtar (yellow card) 36', (goal) 87'; Espinoza 78'	Report	Elliott (yellow card) 57'	Stadium: Geodis Park; Attendance: 25,521; Referee: Lorenzo Hernandez

September 26 26	Charlotte FC	0–1	Chicago Fire FC	Charlotte, North Carolina
6:30 PM	Diani (yellow card) 34'; Saint-Maximin (yellow card) 38'; Biel (yellow card) 74'; Westwood (yellow card) 82'; Ream (yellow card) 90+8'	Report	Oregel (yellow card) 23'; Poreba (yellow card) 80'; Gomez 58'	Stadium: Bank of America Stadium; Attendance: 31,011; Referee: Chris Penso

October 6 27	Chicago Fire FC	3–1	Vancouver Whitecaps FC	Chicago, Illinois
5:30 PM	Bamba 9'; Zinckernagel (yellow card) 19', (goal) 50'; Dean (yellow card) 55'; Haile-Selassie 88'	Report	Johnson (yellow card) 61'; Laborda 73'	Stadium: Soldier Field; Attendance: 31,381; Referee: Sergii Boiko
Note: The game originally scheduled for July 16 was postponed due to smoke from the 2026 Canadian wildfires.

October 10 28	Chicago Fire FC	2–1	New York City FC	Chicago, Illinois
1:30 PM	D'Avilla (yellow card) 20' (red card) 43'; Salétros 55'; Mbokazi (yellow card) 64'; Haile-Selassie 87'; Pineda (yellow card) 90+4'	Report	Wolf 19'	Stadium: Soldier Field; Attendance: 31,893; Referee: Brandon Stevis

October 14 29	Chicago Fire FC	1–3	Philadelphia Union	Chicago, Illinois
7:30 PM	Mbokazi (yellow card) 34'; Elliott (yellow card) 41' (yellow-red card) 45+1'; Haile-Selassie 44'; Zinckernagel (yellow card) 88'	Report	Iloski 49'; Damiani 55', 67'; Vassilev (yellow card) 85'; Pierre (yellow card) 90+3'	Stadium: Soldier Field; Attendance: 21,265; Referee: Ricardo Fierro

October 17 30	New England Revolution	1–0	Chicago Fire FC	Foxborough, Massachusetts
6:30 PM	Polster 26'; Kohler (yellow card) 79'	Report	Gutman (yellow card) 58'	Stadium: Gillette Stadium; Attendance: 34,506; Referee: Nabil Bensalah

October 24 31	Atlanta United FC	2–3	Chicago Fire FC	Atlanta, Georgia
6:30 PM	Jacob 4'; Hoyos (yellow card) 59'; Embolo 68'; Díaz (yellow card) 74'; Alonso (yellow card) 84'	Report	Salétros 30'; D'Avilla (yellow card) 38'; Mekvabishvili 51', (yellow card) 79'; Zinckernagel 60'; Mbokazi (yellow card) 81'; Gomez (yellow card) 84'	Stadium: Mercedes-Benz Stadium; Attendance: 40,026; Referee: Victor Rivas

October 28 32	Chicago Fire FC	2–2	Orlando City SC	Chicago, Illinois
7:30 PM	Oregel (yellow card) 30'; Elliott (yellow card) 45'; Bamba 57'; Haile-Selassie 69'	Report	Angulo 6'; Griezmann 35'; Ellis (yellow card) 45+2'; Brekalo (yellow card) 76'	Stadium: Soldier Field; Attendance: 25,841; Referee: Marcos de Oliveira

October 31 33	Colorado Rapids	2–4	Chicago Fire FC	Commerce City, Colorado
8:30 PM	Whittaker 22'; Navarro (yellow card) 51'; Aaronson 58'; Ojediran (yellow card) 68'; Ku-DiPietro (yellow card) 70'; Holding (yellow card) 90'	Report	Bamba 41', 56'; Allen (yellow card) 45+1'; Lewandowski 74'; Dithejane 88'; Gutman (yellow card) 90+2'	Stadium: Dick's Sporting Goods Park; Attendance: 15,031; Referee: Malik Badawi

November 7 34	Chicago Fire FC	3–4	Columbus Crew	Bridgeview, Illinois
3:00 PM	Lewandowski 8' (pen.), 22' (pen.); Allen (yellow card) 11'; Mbokazi (yellow card) 27'; Haile-Selassie 45+4'; Bamba (yellow card) 53'; Mekvabishvili (yellow card) 74'	Report	Tapia 16', 62', (yellow card) 62'; Zaroury 23'; Rodríguez (yellow card) 79'; Méndez 90+3'	Stadium: SeatGeek Stadium; Attendance: 19,419; Referee: Rosendo Mendoza

=== MLS Cup playoffs ===
==== Round One ====
November 22 Round one match 1	Chicago Fire FC	–	Charlotte FC	Bridgeview, Illinois
5:30 PM				Stadium: SeatGeek Stadium

November 28 Round one match 2	Charlotte FC	–	Chicago Fire FC	Charlotte, North Carolina
11:30 AM				Stadium: Bank of America Stadium

December 2 Round one match 3	Chicago Fire FC	–	Charlotte FC	Bridgeview, Illinois
PM				Stadium: SeatGeek Stadium

=== U.S. Open Cup ===
April 14 Round of 32	Detroit City FC (Michigan)	1–2	(Illinois) Chicago Fire FC	Hamtramck, Michigan
6:30 PM	(yellow card) 38', (goal) 79' Smith; (yellow card) 90' Egbuchulam	Report	(yellow card) 14' Pineda; 34', 36' Shokalook; (yellow card) 60' Oregel; (red card) 81' Dithejane; (yellow card) 88' Waterman	Stadium: Keyworth Stadium; Attendance: 6,229; Referee: Abdou Ndiaye

April 29 Round of 16	Chicago Fire FC (Illinois)	1–2	(Missouri) St. Louis City SC	Bridgeview, Illinois
7:00 PM	(yellow card) 28' Radojević; 63' Salétros; (yellow card) 82' Waterman	Report	(yellow card) 64' Polvara; (yellow card) 68' MacNaughton; 71' Totland; 78' Löwen; (yellow card) 87' Becher	Stadium: SeatGeek Stadium; Attendance: 3,426; Referee: Joshua Encarnación

=== Leagues Cup ===
==== League Phase ====
Pos	Team	Pld	W	PW	PL	L	GF	GA	GD	Pts	Qualification
1	Chicago Fire FC	3	3	0	0	0	7	2	+5	9	Advance to knockout stage
2	Austin FC	3	2	1	0	0	6	1	+5	8	Advance to knockout stage
3	Columbus Crew	3	2	1	0	0	6	3	+3	8	Advance to knockout stage
4	Real Salt Lake	3	2	0	1	0	8	1	+7	7	Advance to knockout stage
5	Los Angeles FC	3	1	2	0	0	3	2	+1	7	

Source: Leagues Cup

August 6 1	Chicago Fire FC (United States)	2–0	(Mexico) Necaxa	Bridgeview, Illinois
7:30 p.m. CDT	Dean 31'; Gutman 69'	Report	R. Martínez (yellow card) 23'; Leyva (yellow card) 61'; Zaleta (yellow card) 61'	Stadium: SeatGeek Stadium; Attendance: 9,005; Referee: Rosendo Mendoza

August 9 2	Chicago Fire FC (United States)	3–1	(Mexico) Santos Laguna	Bridgeview, Illinois
7:00 p.m. CDT	Zinckernagel 72'; Elliott (yellow card) 78'; Lod 90'; Lewandowski 90+3'; Waterman (yellow card) 90+5'	Report	Bullaude 20', (yellow card) 54'; Mariscal (yellow card) 28'; Abella (yellow card) 79'	Stadium: SeatGeek Stadium; Attendance: 14,341; Referee: Reginald Gumbs

August 13 3	Cruz Azul (Mexico)	1–2	(United States) Chicago Fire FC	Bridgeview, Illinois
8:00 p.m. CDT	Ditta (yellow card) 17'; Ibáñez 81'	Report	Dithejane (yellow card) 31', (goal) 67', 90+3'; Pineda (yellow card) 88'	Stadium: SeatGeek Stadium; Attendance: 18,567; Referee: Pierre-Luc Lauzière

August 25 Quarterfinals	Monterrey (Mexico)	2–1	(United States) Chicago Fire FC	Bridgeview, Illinois
7:30 p.m. CDT	Salcedo (yellow card) 29'; Ocampos (penalty missed) 42'; Guzmán 45+4'; Pineda 83'; Rossi (yellow card) 87'; Rodríguez (yellow card) 90+3'		Brady (yellow card) 37'; Zinckernagel (yellow card) 45+3', (goal) 59'; Salétros (yellow card) 63'; Gutman (yellow card) 80'	Stadium: SeatGeek Stadium; Attendance: 18,131; Referee: Rubiel Vazquez

== Statistics ==
Note: italics indicates a player who left during the season while * indicates a Fire II player that joined on a short-term loan or for the Open Cup

=== Games played ===
No.	Name	MLS				Playoffs				Open Cup				Leagues Cup				Total			
No.	Name	Starts	Apps	Minutes	Bench	Starts	Apps	Minutes	Bench	Starts	Apps	Minutes	Bench	Starts	Apps	Minutes	Bench	Starts	Apps	Minutes	Bench
1	Chris Brady	29	29	1350						2	2	180		4	4	360		35	35	3150	
2	Leonardo Barroso	15	19	1206	5									1	1	69	3	16	20	1275	8
3	Jack Elliott	26	27	2245						1	2	50		4	4	360		31	33	2655	
4	Mbekezeli Mbokazi	18	18	1580	2					1	2	130						19	20	1710	2
5	Sam Rogers	6	8	453	8									1	1	90	3	7	9	543	11
6	Anton Salétros	25	26	2163						1	2	76		4	4	352		30	32	2591	
7	Maren Haile-Selassie	25	31	2270						1	2	130		1	4	138		27	37	2543	
8	Chris Mueller	1	5	93	2													1	5	93	2
9	Robert Lewandowski	13	16	1126										4	4	312		17	20	1438	
10	André Franco																				
11	Philip Zinckernagel	29	30	2379						2	2	135		3	4	267		34	36	2781	
12	Puso Dithejane	4	24	653	6					1	1	80		3	4	265		8	29	998	6
14	Viktor Radojević	3	10	294	9					2	2	175		1	1	45	3	6	13	514	12
15	Andrew Gutman	18	23	1645	4						1	13		3	4	315		21	28	1973	4
16	Joel Waterman	11	15	1093	5					2	2	180		3	3	270		16	20	1543	5
17	Robin Lod	17	24	1501							2	38			4	102		17	30	1641	
18	Johan Gomez	4	9	367	1													4	9	367	1
19	Jonathan Bamba	19	24	1567										1	3	77		20	27	164	
20	Jason Shokalook		9	40	8					1	2	110					2	1	11	150	10
21	Andreas Hanche-Olsen	2	4	226	1													2	4	226	1
22	Mauricio Pineda	7	21	817	10					2	2	180		1	4	121		10	27	1118	10
23	Anzor Mekvabishvili		3	82															3	82	
24	Jonathan Dean	21	26	1830	3					1	1	90		3	3	264	1	25	30	2184	4
25	Jeff Gal				4												4				8
27	Dylan Borso		4	75	5					1	2	83						1	6	158	5
28	Dean Boltz				1																1
29	David Poreba	1	3	72	16					1	2	83			2	2	2	2	7	157	18
30	Jack Sandmeyer*				2																2
32	Noah Allen	5	8	515														5	8	515	
35	Sergio Oregel	3	10	337	16					2	2	168		3	4	271		8	16	776	16
37	Robert Turdean				2									1	1	45	3	1	1	45	5
38	Christopher Cupps		2	42	3												3		2	42	6
42	Djé D'Avilla	25	29	2061									2	3	3	237	1	28	32	2298	3
44	Josh Cohen	2	2	180	28								2				4	2	2	180	34
47	Sam Williams	1	1	65	3												1	1	1	65	4
58	Brody Williams*				1																1
65	Oscar Pineda*				1																1
99	Hugo Cuypers	11	11	990						1	1	64						12	12	1054	

=== Goalkeeping ===
No.	Name	MLS			Playoffs			Open Cup			Leagues Cup			Total		
No.	Name	Clean Sheets	Saves	GA	Clean Sheets	Saves	GA	Clean Sheets	Saves	GA	Clean Sheets	Saves	GA	Clean Sheets	Saves	GA
1	Chris Brady	6	84	45					3	3	1	14	4	7	101	52
25	Jeff Gal															
44	Josh Cohen	1	2	1										1	2	1

=== Goals ===
Rk.	Player	MLS	Playoffs	Open Cup	Leagues Cup	Total
Rk.	Player	Goal	Goal	Goal	Goal	Goal
1	(Belgium) Hugo Cuypers	13				13
2	(Switzerland) Maren Haile-Selassie	11				11
3	(Denmark) Philip Zinckernagel	7			2	9
4	(Poland) Robert Lewandowski	6			1	7
5	(Finland) Robin Lod	4			1	5
6	(South Africa) Puso Dithejane	2			2	4
7	(Ivory Coast) Jonathan Bamba	3				3
7	(Sweden) Anton Salétros	2		1		3
9	(United States) Andrew Gutman	1			1	2
9	(United States) Jason Shokalook			2		2
11	(Ivory Coast) Djé D'Avilla	1				1
11	(United States) Jonathan Dean				1	1
11	(United States) Johan Gomez	1				1
11	(Georgia (country)) Anzor Mekvabishvili	1				1
11	(Canada) Joel Waterman	1				1

=== Assists ===
Rk.	Player	MLS	Playoffs	Open Cup	Leagues Cup	Total
Rk.	Player	A	A	A	A	A
1	(Denmark) Philip Zinckernagel	10		2		12
2	(Switzerland) Maren Haile-Selassie	10			1	11
3	(United States) Andrew Gutman	6			1	7
4	(Sweden) Anton Salétros	4			2	6
5	(Ivory Coast) Jonathan Bamba	5				5
5	(Finland) Robin Lod	5				5
7	(Poland) Robert Lewandowski	4				4
8	(England) Jack Elliott	3				3
9	(Belgium) Hugo Cuypers	2				2
9	(Ivory Coast) Djé D'Avilla	2				2
9	(South Africa) Puso Dithejane	1			1	2
9	(United States) David Poreba	1		1		2
13	(Greece) Noah Allen	1				1
13	(United States) Jonathan Dean	1				1
13	(United States) Johan Gomez	1				1
13	(Serbia) Viktor Radojević	1				1
13	(United States) Jason Shokalook	1				1

=== Disciplinary record ===
Rk.	Player	MLS			Playoffs			Open Cup			Leagues Cup			Total			Matches Suspended
Rk.	Player	Yellow card	Second yellow card	Red card	Yellow card	Second yellow card	Red card	Yellow card	Second yellow card	Red card	Yellow card	Second yellow card	Red card	Yellow card	Second yellow card	Red card	Matches Suspended
1	(United States) Jonathan Dean	3		1										3		1	March 7 vs Columbus
1	(South Africa) Puso Dithejane	2								1	1			3		1	April 29 vs St. Louis (Open Cup)
3	(Ivory Coast) Djé D'Avilla	8	1											8	1		May 16 vs Montreal; October 14th vs Philadelphia; October 28th vs Orlando
4	(England) Jack Elliott	5	1								1			6	1		October 17 vs New England; October 24th vs Atlanta
5	(Canada) Joel Waterman	5						2			1			8			
6	(Denmark) Philip Zinckernagel	6									1			7			
7	(Sweden) Anton Salétros	5									1			6			
8	(United States) Andrew Gutman	4									1			5			
8	(South Africa) Mbekezeli Mbokazi	5												5			October 28th vs Orlando
10	(Serbia) Viktor Radojević	3									1			4			
11	(Finland) Robin Lod	3												3			
11	(United States) Sergio Oregel	2						1						3			
11	(United States) Mauricio Pineda	1						1			1			3			
14	(Ivory Coast) Jonathan Bamba	2												2			
14	(Portugal) Leonardo Barroso	2												2			
14	(United States) Chris Brady	1									1			2			
14	(United States) Sam Rogers	2												2			
18	(Greece) Noah Allen	1												1			
18	(United States) Dylan Borso	1												1			
18	(Belgium) Hugo Cuypers	1												1			
18	(United States) Johan Gomez	1												1			
18	(Switzerland) Maren Haile-Selassie	1												1			
18	(Poland) Robert Lewandowski	1												1			
18	(Georgia (country)) Anzor Mekvabishvili	1												1			
18	(United States) Chris Mueller	1												1			
18	(United States) David Poreba	1												1			

== Awards ==
=== Fire Player of the Month ===
Month	Player	Reference
February and March	(Belgium) Hugo Cuypers	
April	(United States) Chris Brady	
May	(Denmark) Philip Zinckernagel	
July and August	(South Africa) Puso Dithejane	
September	(Switzerland) Maren Haile-Selassie	

=== MLS Team of the Matchday ===
Matchday	Player	Position	Reference
3	(United States) Chris Brady (1)	Goalkeeper	
5	(Belgium) Hugo Cuypers (1)	Striker	
6	(United States) Chris Brady (2)	Goalkeeper	
7	(South Africa) Mbekezeli Mbokazi (1)	Bench	
8	(Belgium) Hugo Cuypers (2)	Bench	
10	(Denmark) Philip Zinckernagel (1)	Midfielder	
10	(Belgium) Hugo Cuypers (2)	Bench	
13	(United States) Chris Brady (3)	Goalkeeper	
14	(United States) Chris Brady (4)	Goalkeeper	
14	(South Africa) Mbekezeli Mbokazi (2)	Defender	
14	(Denmark) Philip Zinckernagel (2)	Bench	
15	(United States) Andrew Gutman (1)	Defender	
19	(Denmark) Philip Zinckernagel (3)	Midfielder	
19	(Poland) Robert Lewandowski (1)	Forward	
20	(United States) Andrew Gutman (2)	Defender	
20	(Ivory Coast) Djé D'Avilla	Midfielder	
21	(Poland) Robert Lewandowski (2)	Bench	
23	(Poland) Robert Lewandowski (3)	Bench	
24	(Switzerland) Maren Haile-Selassie (1)	Midfielder	
24	(United States) Chris Brady (5)	Goalkeeper	
24	(United States) Andrew Gutman (3)	Defender	
28	(England) Jack Elliott	Defender	
29	(Switzerland) Maren Haile-Selassie (2)	Midfielder	

=== MLS Player of the Matchday ===
Matchday	Player	Stats	Reference
19	(Poland) Robert Lewandowski	2 goals	

=== All-Star Game ===
Player	Stats
(Belgium) Hugo Cuypers	Did not play, transferred
(South Africa) Mbekezeli Mbokazi	Did not play, injured
(Denmark) Philip Zinckernagel	1 Goal in 45 minutes
