= 2021–22 G.D. Estoril Praia season =

Estoril
2021–22 season
- Owner: MSP Sports Capital
- Chairman: Jeffrey Saunders
- Manager: Bruno Pinheiro
- Stadium: Estádio António Coimbra da Mota
- Primeira Liga: 9th
- Taça de Portugal: Fifth round
- Taça da Liga: Second round
Home colours	Away colours	Third colours

The 2021–22 season is the 83rd season in the existence of G.D. Estoril Praia and the club's first season in the top flight of Portuguese football. In addition to the domestic league, G.D. Estoril Praia participated in this season's editions of the Taça de Portugal and the Taça da Liga.

== Players ==
=== First-team squad ===
As of 29 July 2021

Note: Flags indicate national team as defined under FIFA eligibility rules; some limited exceptions apply. Players may hold more than one non-FIFA nationality.

No.	Pos.	Nation	Player
2	DF	ESP	Carles Soria
3	DF	POR	Bernardo Vital
4	DF	BRA	Lucas Áfrico
5	DF	BRA	Volnei Feltes
6	MF	POR	Francisco Geraldes
7	FW	POR	Chiquinho
8	MF	ARG	Lucho Vega
9	FW	BRA	André Clóvis
10	MF	POR	André Franco
12	GK	BRA	Thiago Silva
13	MF	POR	Miguel Crespo
14	DF	SEN	Racine Coly
18	FW	COL	Leonardo Acevedo
19	MF	POR	Afonso Valente
20	MF	POR	Bruno Lourenço
21	MF	POR	João Gamboa

No.	Pos.	Nation	Player
22	DF	POR	David Bruno
26	FW	JPN	Ryotaro Meshino (on loan from Manchester City)
31	DF	POR	Joãozinho
32	MF	FRA	Loreintz Rosier
33	DF	BRA	Lucas
37	MF	FRA	Elias Achouri
38	FW	POR	Paulinho
47	GK	POR	João Oliveira
48	DF	POR	Tiago Manso
90	FW	CPV	Gilson Tavares
99	GK	POR	Dani Figueira
—	FW	BRA	Arthur Gomes
—	DF	BRA	Patrick William (on loan from Famalicão)
—	MF	ECU	Johan Mina (on loan from Werder Bremen)
—	DF	VEN	Nahuel Ferraresi (on loan from Manchester City)

=== Other players under contract ===
Note: Flags indicate national team as defined under FIFA eligibility rules; some limited exceptions apply. Players may hold more than one non-FIFA nationality.

No.	Pos.	Nation	Player
—	DF	GBS	Simão Júnior

=== Out on loan ===
Note: Flags indicate national team as defined under FIFA eligibility rules; some limited exceptions apply. Players may hold more than one non-FIFA nationality.

No.	Pos.	Nation	Player
—	DF	BRA	Henrique Trevisan (at Oita Trinita until 1 January 2022)

== Pre-season and friendlies ==
Win Draw Loss Fixtures

== Competitions ==
=== Overall record ===
Competition	First match	Last match	Starting round	Final position	Record							
Competition	First match	Last match	Starting round	Final position	Pld	W	D	L	GF	GA	GD	Win %
Primeira Liga	7 August 2021	May 2022	Matchday 1		16	6	7	3	21	16	+5	37.50
Taça de Portugal	17 October 2021	21 December 2021	Third round	Fifth round	3	2	0	1	7	3	+4	66.67
Taça da Liga	25 July 2021	1 August 2021	First round	Second round	2	1	0	1	2	2	+0	50.00
Total					21	9	7	5	30	21	+9	42.86

Last updated: 30 December 2021
Source: Soccerway

=== Primeira Liga ===
==== League table ====
Pos	Team	Pld	W	D	L	GF	GA	GD	Pts
7	Santa Clara	34	9	13	12	38	54	−16	40
8	Famalicão	34	9	12	13	45	51	−6	39 (Note: Head-to-head points: Famalicão 4, Estoril 1.)
9	Estoril	34	9	12	13	36	43	−7	39
10	Marítimo	34	9	11	14	39	44	−5	38 (Note: Head-to-head points: Marítimo 10, Paços de Ferreira 8, Boavista 7, Portimonense 6.)
11	Paços de Ferreira	34	9	11	14	29	44	−15	38

Source: Liga Portugal
Rules for classification: 1) Points; 2) Head-to-head points; 3) Head-to-head goal difference; 4) Head-to-head away goals scored; 5) Goal difference; 6) Matches won; 7) Goals scored; 8) Play-off.

==== Results summary ====
Overall								Home						Away					
Pld	W	D	L	GF	GA	GD	Pts	W	D	L	GF	GA	GD	W	D	L	GF	GA	GD
8	4	3	1	12	7	+5	15	1	2	1	4	4	0	3	1	0	8	3	+5

Last updated: 3 October 2021.
Source: Liga Portugal

==== Results by round ====
Round	1	2	3	4	5	6	7	8	9	10
Ground	A	H	A	H	A	H	A	H	A	H
Result	W	D	W	W	W	L	D	D		
Position	5	5	3	4	2	4	4	4		

Updated to match(es) played on 3 October 2021. Source: Liga Portugal
A = Away; H = Home; W = Win; D = Draw; L = Loss

==== Matches ====
7 August 2021 1	Arouca	0–2	Estoril	Arouca
12:45 WEST (UTC+1)	Caballero (yellow card) 88'	Report	Franco 4'; Gamboa (yellow card) 38'; Figueira (yellow card) 57'; Geraldes (yellow card) 89'; Meshino 90+6'	Stadium: Estádio Municipal de Arouca; Attendance: 513; Referee: Hugo Silva

13 August 2021 2	Estoril	0–0	Vitória de Guimarães	Estoril
20:15 WEST (UTC+1)		Report		Stadium: Estádio António Coimbra da Mota; Attendance: 876; Referee: João Gonçalves

23 August 2021 3	Paços de Ferreira	1–3	Estoril	Paços de Ferreira
19:00 WEST (UTC+1)	Delgado 30'; Fonseca (yellow card) 58'; Ferreira (yellow card) 67'; Luíz Carlos (yellow card) 80'	Report	Chiquinho (yellow card) 22'; Crespo (yellow card) 37'; Lourenço 45+1'; Franco 78' (pen.); Joãozinho 81'; Ferraresi (yellow card) 88'	Stadium: Estádio da Mata Real; Attendance: 1,569; Referee: Fábio Veríssimo

19 September 2021 6	Estoril	0–1	Sporting CP	Estoril
20:30 WEST (UTC+1)		Report	Porro 67'	Stadium: Estádio António Coimbra da Mota; Attendance: 1,987; Referee: Tiago Martins

27 September 2021 7	Boavista	1–1	Estoril	Porto
21:15 WEST (UTC+1)		Report		Stadium: Estádio do Bessa; Attendance: 2,094; Referee: Miguel Nogueira

30 October 2021 10	Estoril	1–1	Benfica	Estoril
19:00 WEST (UTC+1)	Lourenço (yellow card) 42'; Áfrico (yellow card) 54'; Rosier 90'; Geraldes (yellow card) 90+4'	Report	Veríssimo 2', (yellow card) 75'; Radonjić (yellow card) 55'	Stadium: Estádio António Coimbra da Mota; Attendance: 4,128; Referee: João Pinheiro

5 December 2021 13	Braga	2–0	Estoril	Braga
20:30 WET (UTC±0)	R. Horta 34', 39'	Report		Stadium: Estádio Municipal de Braga; Attendance: 3,416; Referee: Gustavo Correia

8 January 2022 17	Estoril	2–3	Porto	Estoril
18:00 WET (UTC±0)	Arthur 38'; Franco 42'	Report	Taremi 49'; Luis Díaz 84'; Conceição 90'	Stadium: Estádio António Coimbra da Mota; Attendance: 2,876; Referee: António Nobre

20 February 2022 23	Sporting CP	3–0	Estoril	Lisbon
18:00 WET (UTC±0)	Gonçalves 40'; Reis 76'; Sarabia 81'	Report		Stadium: Estádio José Alvalade; Attendance: 35,270; Referee: Hélder Malheiro

18 April 2022 30	Estoril	0–0	Braga	Estoril
20:30 WEST (UTC+1)		Report		Stadium: Estádio António Coimbra da Mota; Attendance: 1,246; Referee: Rui Costa

24 April 2022 31	Estoril	2–2	Belenenses SAD	Estoril
18:00 WEST (UTC+1)	Arthur (yellow card) 26'; Rosier 27', (yellow card) 70' (yellow-red card) 90+1'; Joãozinho (yellow card) 30'; Franco 45+1' (pen.), (yellow card) 65', (red card) 90+7'; Ferraresi (yellow card) 65'; Lourenço (yellow card) 90+3'; Baró (red card) 90+6'	Report	Carraça (yellow card) 26'; Safira 66' (pen.); Sousa (yellow card) 80'; Tavares (yellow card) 83'; Sandro 90+6'; Camará (red card) 90+7'; Calila (red card) 90+7'	Stadium: Estádio António Coimbra da Mota; Attendance: 1,425; Referee: Tiago Martins

=== Taça de Portugal ===
17 October 2021 Third round	Felgueiras	0–1	Estoril	Felgueiras
15:00 WEST (UTC+1)		Report	Acevedo 36' (pen.)	Stadium: Estádio Dr. Machado de Matos; Referee: Fábio Veríssimo

21 November 2021 Fourth round	Serpa	0–5	Estoril	Serpa
11:00 WET (UTC±0)		Report	Acevedo 14', 54'; Chiquinho 18'; Geraldes 57'; Clóvis 76'	Stadium: Complexo Desportivo Manuel Baião; Referee: Antônio Nobre

21 December 2021 Fifth round	Tondela	3–1	Estoril	Tondela
18:45 WET (UTC±0)	Dantas 45'; Boselli 51'; Dos Anjos 68'	Report	Acevedo 18' (pen.)	Stadium: Estádio João Cardoso; Referee: João Pinheiro

=== Taça da Liga ===
25 July 2021 First round	Nacional	1–2	Estoril	Funchal
18:00 WEST (UTC+1)	Róchez 36'	Report	Crespo 57'; Cardoso Santo 90'	Stadium: Estádio da Madeira; Attendance: 0 Referee: Cláudio Pereira

1 August 2021 Second round	Famalicão	1–0	Estoril	Vila Nova de Famalicão
14:00 WEST (UTC+1)	B. Rodrigues 9'	Report		Stadium: Estádio Municipal 22 de Junho; Attendance: 444; Referee: António Nobre
