= Jonathan Bamba =

Ivorian footballer (born 1996)

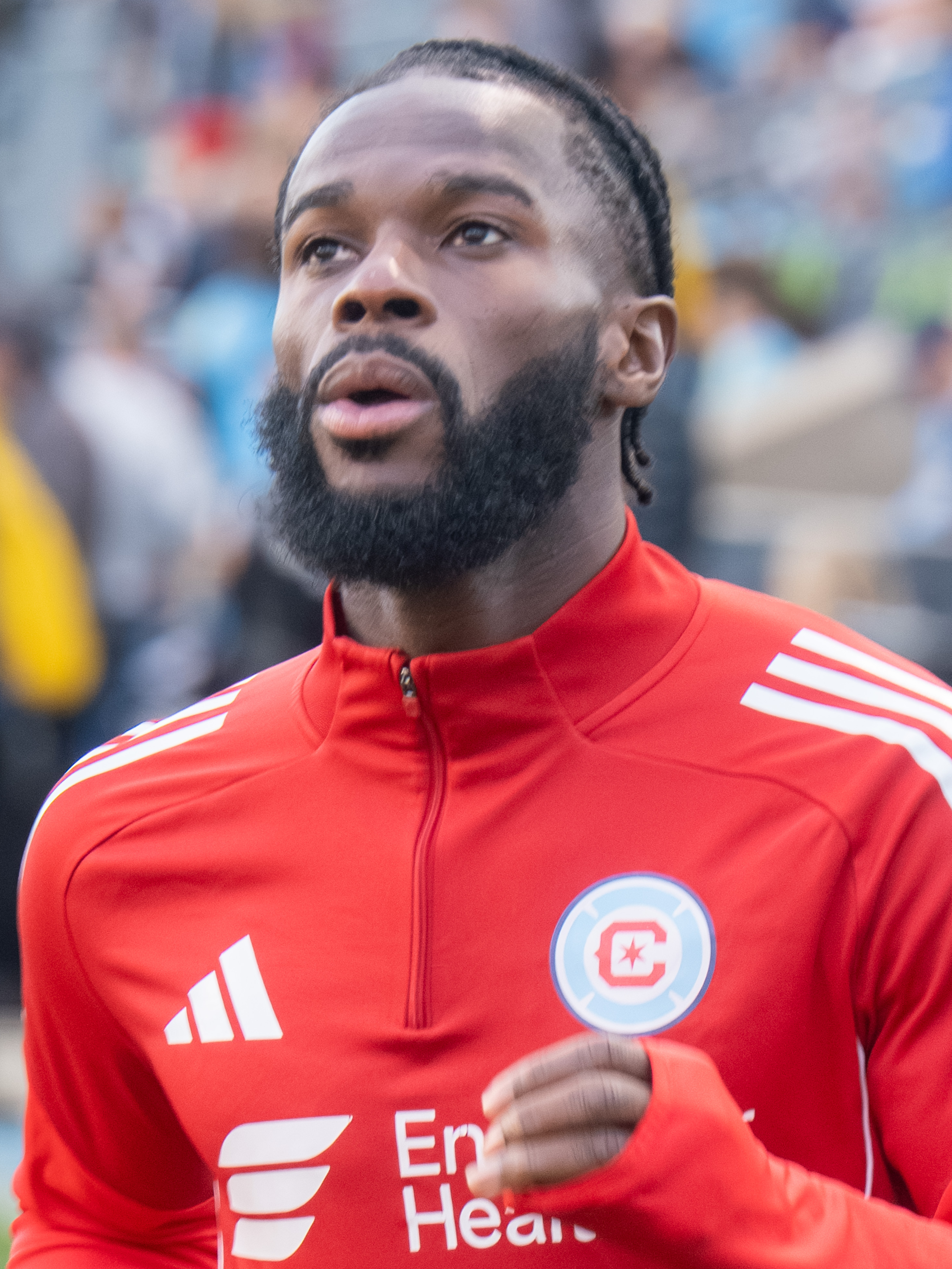
- Bamba with the Chicago Fire in 2025

Personal information
- Full name: Jonathan Fousseni Bamba
- Date of birth: 26 March 1996 (age 30)
- Place of birth: Alfortville, France
- Height: 1.75 m (5 ft 9 in)
- Positions: Left winger; attacking midfielder

Team information
- Current team: Chicago Fire
- Number: 19

Youth career
- 2002–2005: CA Paris
- 2005–2011: UJA Alfortville
- 2011–2015: Saint-Étienne

Senior career*
Years	Team	Apps	(Gls)
2013–2015	Saint-Étienne B	51	(12)
2015–2018	Saint-Étienne	42	(8)
2016	→ Paris FC (loan)	14	(0)
2016	→ Sint-Truiden (loan)	8	(2)
2017	→ Angers (loan)	16	(3)
2018–2023	Lille	167	(27)
2023–2025	Celta Vigo	39	(3)
2025–	Chicago Fire	61	(11)

International career
2011	France U16	2	(0)
2013	France U18	3	(0)
2015–2016	France U20	7	(2)
2017–2019	France U21	21	(5)
2023–2024	Ivory Coast	10	(1)
Medal record
Representing Ivory Coast
Men's football
Africa Cup of Nations
Winner	2023 Ivory Coast
- * Club domestic league appearances and goals as of 23:13, 17 November 2026 (UTC)

Jonathan Fousseni Bamba (born 26 March 1996) is a professional footballer who plays as a left winger or attacking midfielder for Major League Soccer club Chicago Fire. Born in France, he played for the Ivory Coast national team.

== Club career ==
=== Saint-Étienne ===
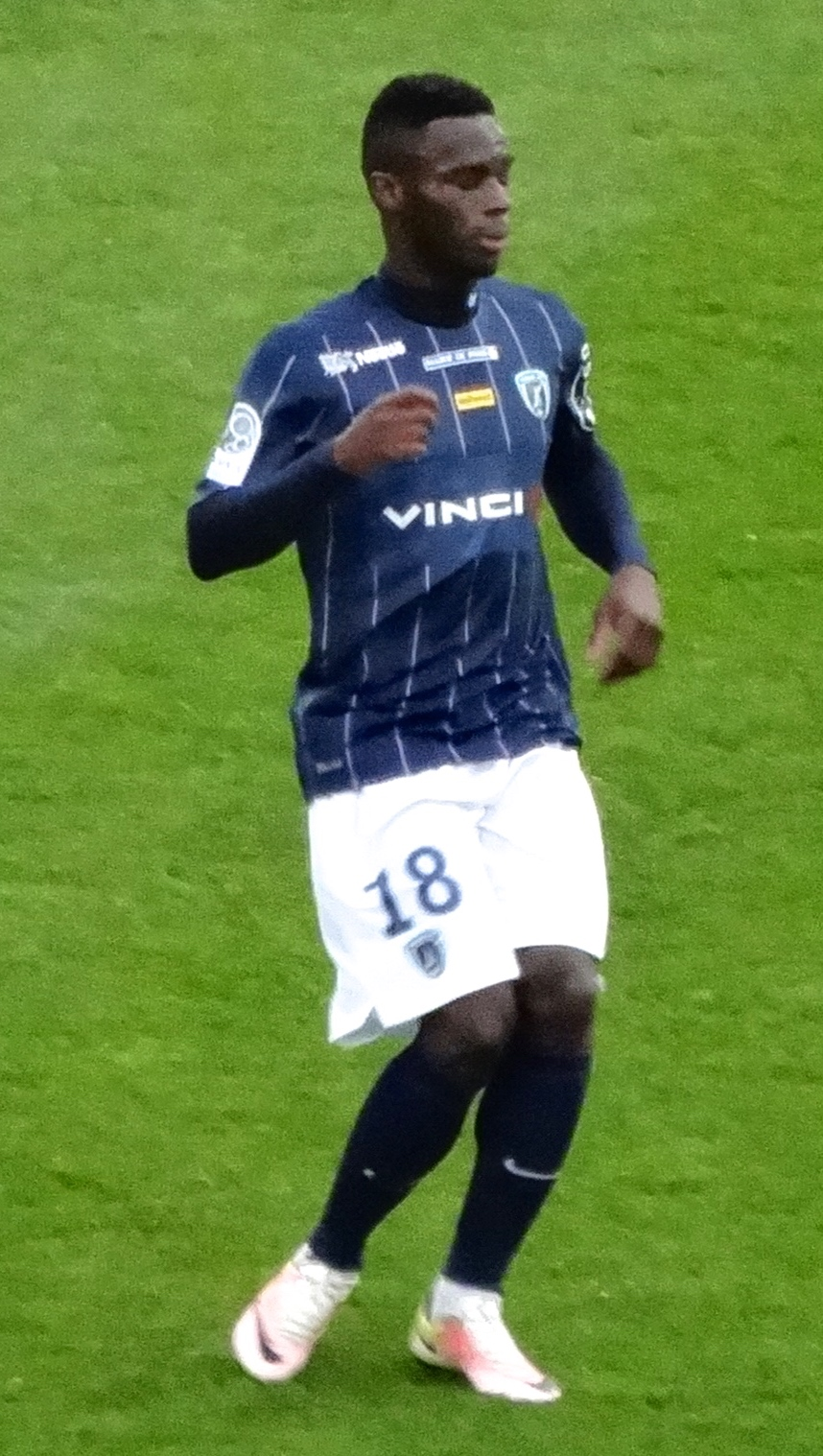
Bamba playing for Paris FC in 2016.

Jonathan Fousseni Bamba is a graduate of Saint-Étienne youth academy, which he joined in 2011.

Bamba made his Ligue 1 debut on 25 January 2015 against Paris Saint-Germain replacing Yohan Mollo after 82 minutes in a 0–1 home defeat. During the summer of 2015 he scored against Ajax Amsterdam in a pre-season friendly. On 20 September 2015, he started in the Ligue 1 match against Nantes and scored in the 26th minute to register his first competitive goal for Saint-Étienne's first team in a 2–0 home win.

On 18 January 2016, Bamba joined Ligue 2 club Paris FC on loan until the end of the 2015-16 season, with Paris FC not given an option to buy him when the loan expired. Bamba was loaned to Belgian First Division A club Sint-Truiden in the summer of 2016. However Sint-Truiden sent him back early to Saint-Etienne during the winter break of the 2016–17 season. On 4 January 2017, Bamba was loaned to Ligue 1 club Angers until the end of the 2016-17 season.

On 24 September 2017, Bamba scored Saint-Étienne's second equalizing goal from the penalty spot in a 2–2 Ligue 1 home draw against Rennes to register his fourth Ligue 1 goal (three of which were penalties) of the 2017–18 season.

=== Lille ===
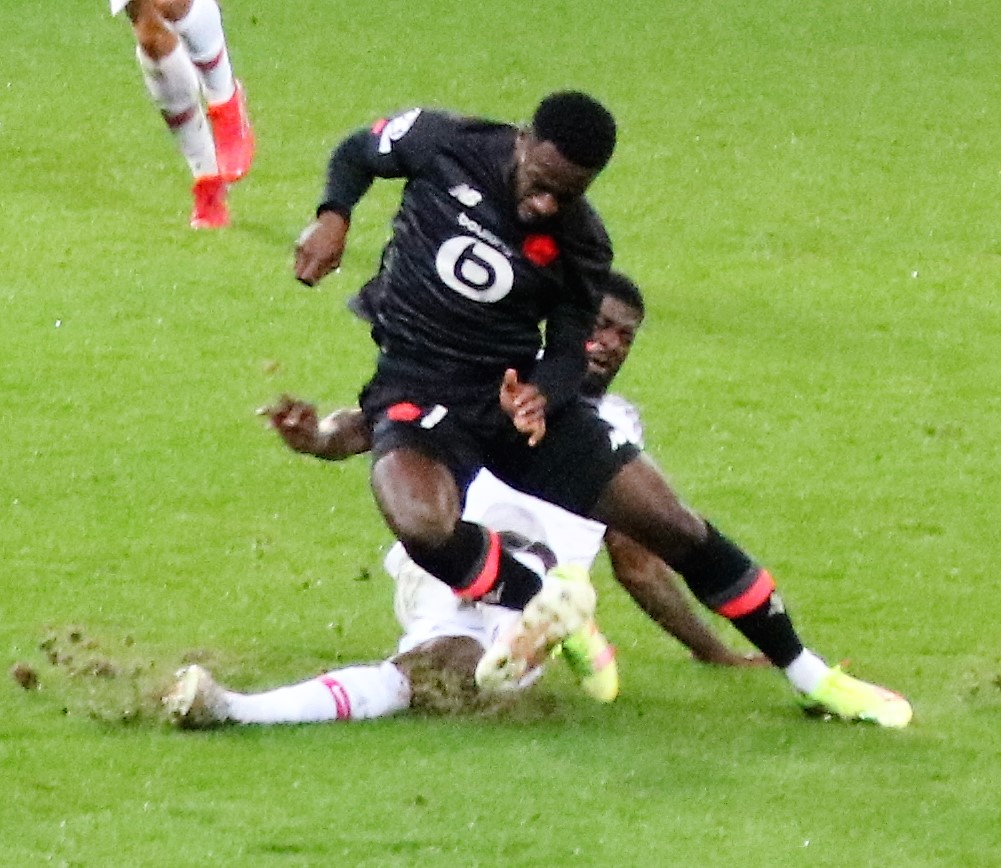
Bamba (black) with Lille against Salzburg in 2021

On 2 July 2018, Bamba signed a five-year deal with Lille OSC. On 11 August 2018, Bamba made his competitive debut for Lille and scored the final goal of the match in the 3–1 Ligue 1 home win over Stade Rennais. Two weeks later, he played his third Ligue 1 match for Lille and took his 2018–19 Ligue 1 goal tally to three when he scored two goals in the 3–0 Ligue 1 home win over Guingamp. On 30 September, Bamba scored two goals (including a penalty) in the final six minutes of the match in the 3–0 Ligue 1 home win over Marseille. On 6 October, he took his 2018–19 Ligue 1 goal tally to seven (he had scored only seven Ligue 1 goals during the entire 2017–18 season) when he scored two goals again and assisted Nicolas Pépé's goal in a 3–1 Ligue 1 home win over Saint-Étienne.

After a cancelled 2019–20 Ligue 1 season because of the COVID-19 pandemic, Bamba became confirmed as a regular starter, as Lille won their fourth league title during the 2020–21 season, being in the field in all league games.

During the 2021–22 Lille OSC season, he participated in the 1–0 win against PSG in the Trophée des Champions, with the club winning that trophy for the first time ever. Later, he helped the team to get out of the 2021–22 UEFA Champions League group stage and played against Chelsea in round of 16.

=== Celta ===
On 18 July 2023, Bamba signed with La Liga club Celta.

=== Chicago Fire ===
On 21 January 2025, Bamba moved to Major League Soccer side Chicago Fire on a three-year deal.

== International career ==
Bamba was born in France and is of Ivorian descent. He is a dual-national, and was able to choose to represent either France or Ivory Coast internationally.

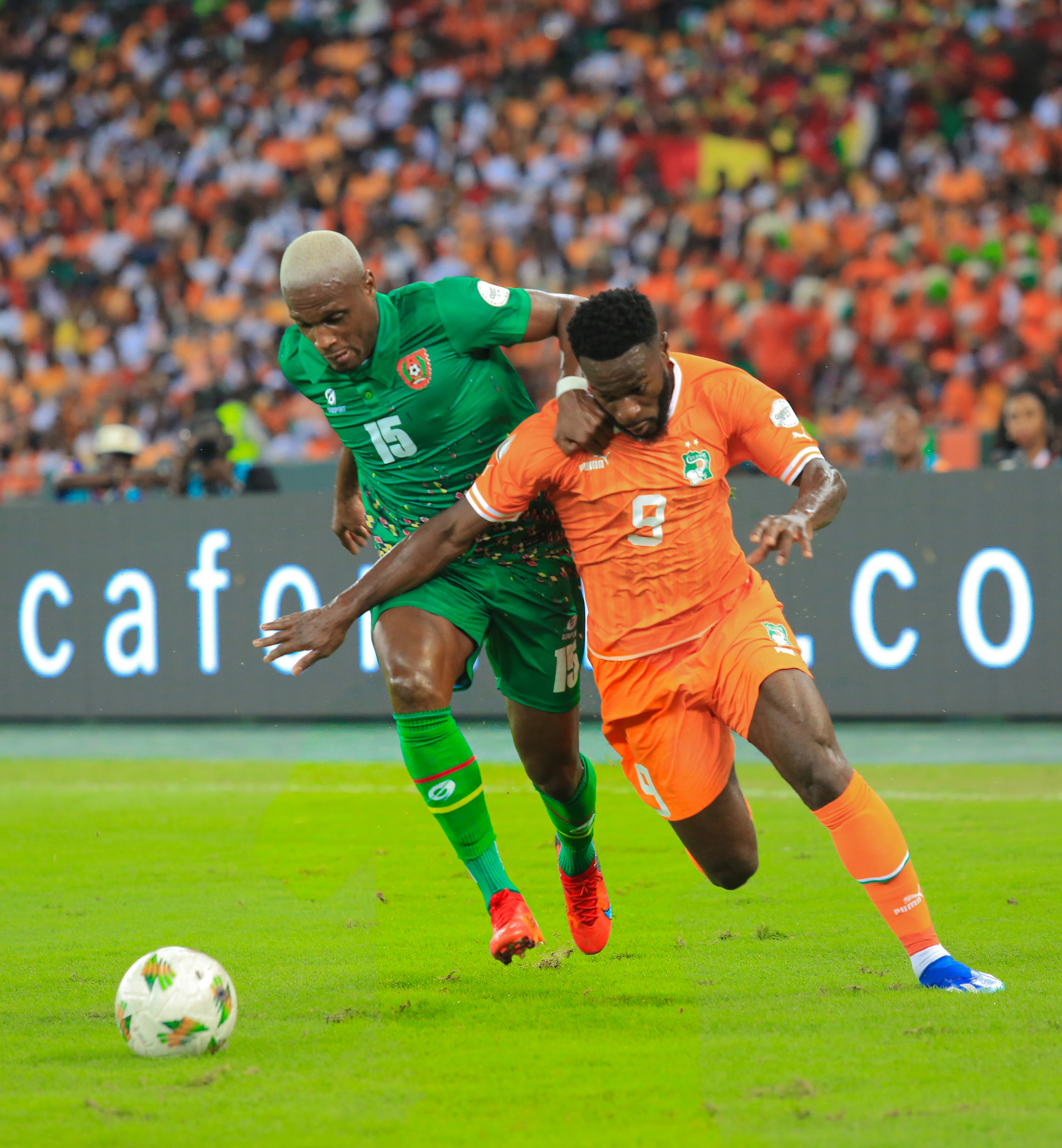
Bamba (right) with Ivory Coast in 2024

After representing France at various youth levels, he switched his allegiance to the latter in March 2023, as he accepted a call-up to the Ivorian senior national team for two Africa Cup of Nations qualification matches against Comoros.

In December 2023, Bamba was named in the Ivory Coast's squad for the 2023 Africa Cup of Nations. He was in the starting XI for Ivory Coast's 2–0 win over Guinea-Bissau in the tournament's opening match.

== Career statistics ==
=== Club ===
As of match played 7 November 2026

Appearances and goals by club, season and competition
Club	Season	League			National cup (Note: Includes Coupe de France, Belgian Cup, Copa del Rey, U.S. Open Cup)		League cup (Note: Includes Coupe de la Ligue)		Continental		Other		Total	
Club	Season	Division	Apps	Goals	Apps	Goals	Apps	Goals	Apps	Goals	Apps	Goals	Apps	Goals
Saint-Étienne	2014–15	Ligue 1	3	0	1	0	0	0	0	0	—		4	0
Saint-Étienne	2015–16	Ligue 1	5	1	1	0	1	0	4 (Note: Appearances in UEFA Europa League)	0	—		11	1
Saint-Étienne	2017–18	Ligue 1	34	7	2	1	1	0	—		—		37	8
Saint-Étienne	Total		42	8	4	1	2	0	4	0	0	0	52	9
Paris FC (loan)	2015–16	Ligue 2	14	0	0	0	0	0	—		—		14	0
Sint-Truiden (loan)	2016–17	Belgian Pro League	8	2	3	1	—		—		—		11	3
Angers (loan)	2016–17	Ligue 1	16	3	4	0	0	0	—		—		20	3
Lille	2018–19	Ligue 1	38	13	3	1	0	0	—		—		41	14
Lille	2019–20	Ligue 1	26	1	3	0	2	0	6 (Note: Appearances in UEFA Champions League)	0	—		37	1
Lille	2020–21	Ligue 1	38	6	2	0	—		8	1	—		48	7
Lille	2021–22	Ligue 1	31	1	1	0	—		6	0	1 (Note: Appearance in Trophée des Champions)	0	39	1
Lille	2022–23	Ligue 1	34	6	1	0	—		—		—		35	6
Lille	Total		167	27	10	1	2	0	20	1	1	0	200	29
Celta	2023–24	La Liga	27	3	1	2	—		—		—		28	5
Celta	2024–25	La Liga	12	0	2	1	—		—		—		14	1
Celta	Total		39	3	3	3	0	0	0	0	0	0	42	6
Chicago Fire	2025	Major League Soccer	34	5	3	0	—		—		3 (Note: Appearances in MLS Cup playoffs)	1	40	6
Chicago Fire	2026	Major League Soccer	27	6	0	0	—		—		3 (Note: Appearances in Leagues Cup)	0	30	6
Chicago Fire	Total		61	11	3	0	0	0	0	0	6	1	70	12
Career total			347	54	27	6	4	0	24	1	7	1	409	62

=== International ===
As of match played 26 March 2024

Appearances and goals by national team and year
National team	Year	Apps	Goals
Ivory Coast	2023	5	0
Ivory Coast	2024	5	1
Total		10	1

Scores and results list Ivory Coast's goal tally first, score column indicates score after each Bamba goal.

List of international goals scored by Jonathan Bamba
No.	Date	Venue	Opponent	Score	Result	Competition
1	6 January 2024	Laurent Pokou Stadium, San Pédro, Ivory Coast	Sierra Leone	3–0	5–1	Friendly

== Honours ==
Lille

- Ligue 1: 2020–21
- Trophée des Champions: 2021

Ivory Coast

- Africa Cup of Nations: 2023

Individual

- UNFP Ligue 1 Player of the Month: April 2019, October 2020
