= Maren Haile-Selassie =

Swiss footballer (born 1999)

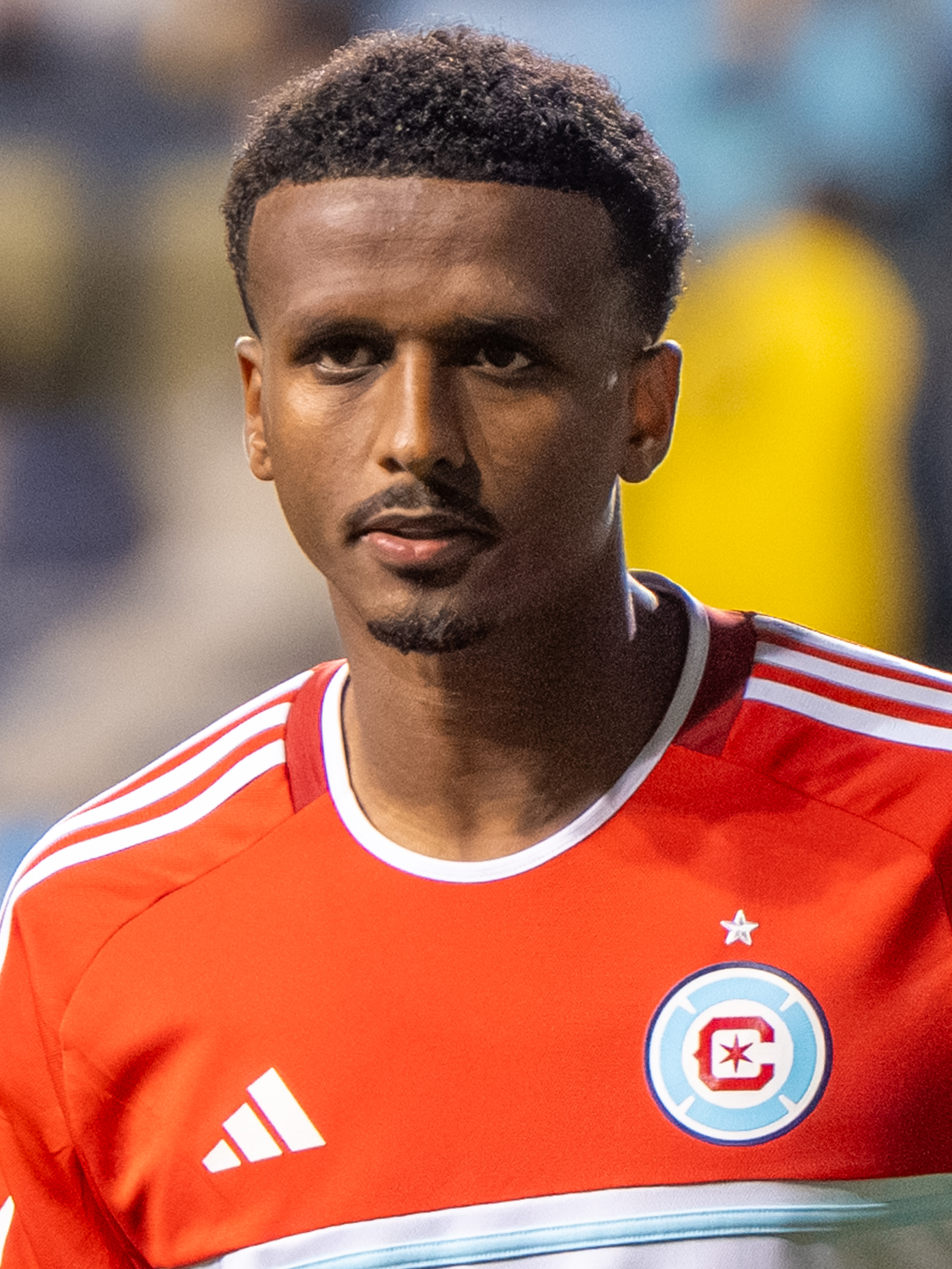
- Haile-Selassie with the Chicago Fire in 2025

Personal information
- Date of birth: 13 March 1999 (age 27)
- Place of birth: Zürich, Switzerland
- Height: 1.76 m (5 ft 9 in)
- Position: Left midfielder

Team information
- Current team: Chicago Fire
- Number: 7

Youth career
- 2009–2012: FC Zürich
- 2012–2013: FC Volketswil
- 2013–2014: FC Zürich
- 2014: FC Volketswil
- 2014–2017: Zürich

Senior career*
Years	Team	Apps	(Gls)
2017–2021	Zürich	7	(0)
2019	→ Rapperswil-Jona (loan)	18	(2)
2019–2020	→ Neuchâtel Xamax (loan)	24	(1)
2020–2021	→ Wil (loan)	35	(7)
2021–2022	Neuchâtel Xamax	17	(5)
2022–2023	Lugano	32	(3)
2023	→ Chicago Fire (loan)	32	(6)
2024–	Chicago Fire	91	(20)

International career^{‡}
2016	Switzerland U18	2	(0)
2017–2018	Switzerland U19	4	(0)
2018–2019	Switzerland U20	6	(2)
- * Club domestic league appearances and goals as of 12 November 2026 ‡ National team caps and goals as of 18 November 2019

Maren Haile-Selassie (born 13 March 1999) is a Swiss professional footballer who plays for Major League Soccer side Chicago Fire as a left midfielder.

== Club career ==
Haile-Selassie made his professional debut for Zürich in a 2–1 Swiss Super League win over Thun on 30 July 2017.

On 9 January 2019, Haile-Selassie was loaned out to Rapperswil-Jona. On 10 July 2019, he was then loaned out to Neuchâtel Xamax for the 2019–20 season.

On 20 December 2021, Haile-Selassie signed a contract with Lugano until 30 June 2025.

On 15 May 2022, Haile-Selassie scored a goal in Lugano's 4–1 victory over St. Gallen in the final of the Swiss Cup.

On 27 December 2022, it was announced that Haile-Selassie would play with Major League Soccer side Chicago Fire for their 2023 season, with Chicago holding an option to make the move permanent. On 4 October 2023, Haile-Selassie scored twice as the Fire defeated Inter Miami, 4-1, earning a spot in the MLS Team of the Matchday.

On 22 November 2023, Chicago Fire exercised their option to sign Haile-Selassie on a permanent basis. He finished the 2023 season as the club's top scorer with six league goals, winning the team's Golden Boot.

On 11 April 2026, Haile-Selassie, starting at forward in place of the injured Hugo Cuypers, scored the only goal of a 1–0 home win over Atlanta United, his first of the 2026 season.

== International career ==
Haile-Selassie was born in Switzerland to Ethiopian parents. He is a former youth international for Switzerland.

== Career statistics ==
As of match played 25 July 2026

Appearances and goals by club, season and competition
Club	Season	League			National cup (Note: Includes Swiss Cup (Switzerland) and U.S. Open Cup (United States))		Continental (Note: Includes UEFA Europa Conference League qualifying)		Other (Note: Includes Leagues Cup and MLS Cup Playoffs)		Total	
Club	Season	Division	Apps	Goals	Apps	Goals	Apps	Goals	Apps	Goals	Apps	Goals
Zürich	2017–18	Swiss Super League	6	0	3	0	—	—	—	—	9	0
Zürich	2018–19	Swiss Super League	1	0	1	0	—	—	—	—	2	0
Zürich	Total		7	0	4	0	—	—	—	—	11	0
Rapperswil-Jona (loan)	2018–19	Swiss Challenge League	18	2	0	0	—	—	—	—	18	2
Neuchâtel Xamax (loan)	2019–20	Swiss Super League	24	1	2	0	—	—	—	—	26	1
Wil (loan)	2020–21	Swiss Challenge League	35	7	1	0	—	—	—	—	36	7
Neuchâtel Xamax	2021–22	Swiss Challenge League	17	5	2	1	—	—	—	—	19	6
Lugano	2021–22	Swiss Super League	17	2	3	2	—	—	—	—	20	4
Lugano	2022–23	Swiss Super League	15	1	3	2	2	0	—	—	20	3
Lugano	Total		32	3	6	4	2	0	—	—	40	7
Chicago Fire (loan)	2023	Major League Soccer	32	6	4	1	—	—	3	0	39	7
Chicago Fire	2024	Major League Soccer	27	5	0	0	—	—	2	0	29	5
Chicago Fire	2025	Major League Soccer	30	2	3	1	—	—	3	0	36	3
Chicago Fire	2026	Major League Soccer	16	3	2	0	—	—	0	0	18	3
Chicago Fire	Total		73	10	5	1	—	—	5	0	83	11
Career total			238	34	24	7	2	0	8	0	272	41

== Honours ==
Zürich

- Swiss Cup: 2017–18

Lugano

- Swiss Cup: 2021–22
