= Joel Waterman =

Canadian soccer player (born 1996)

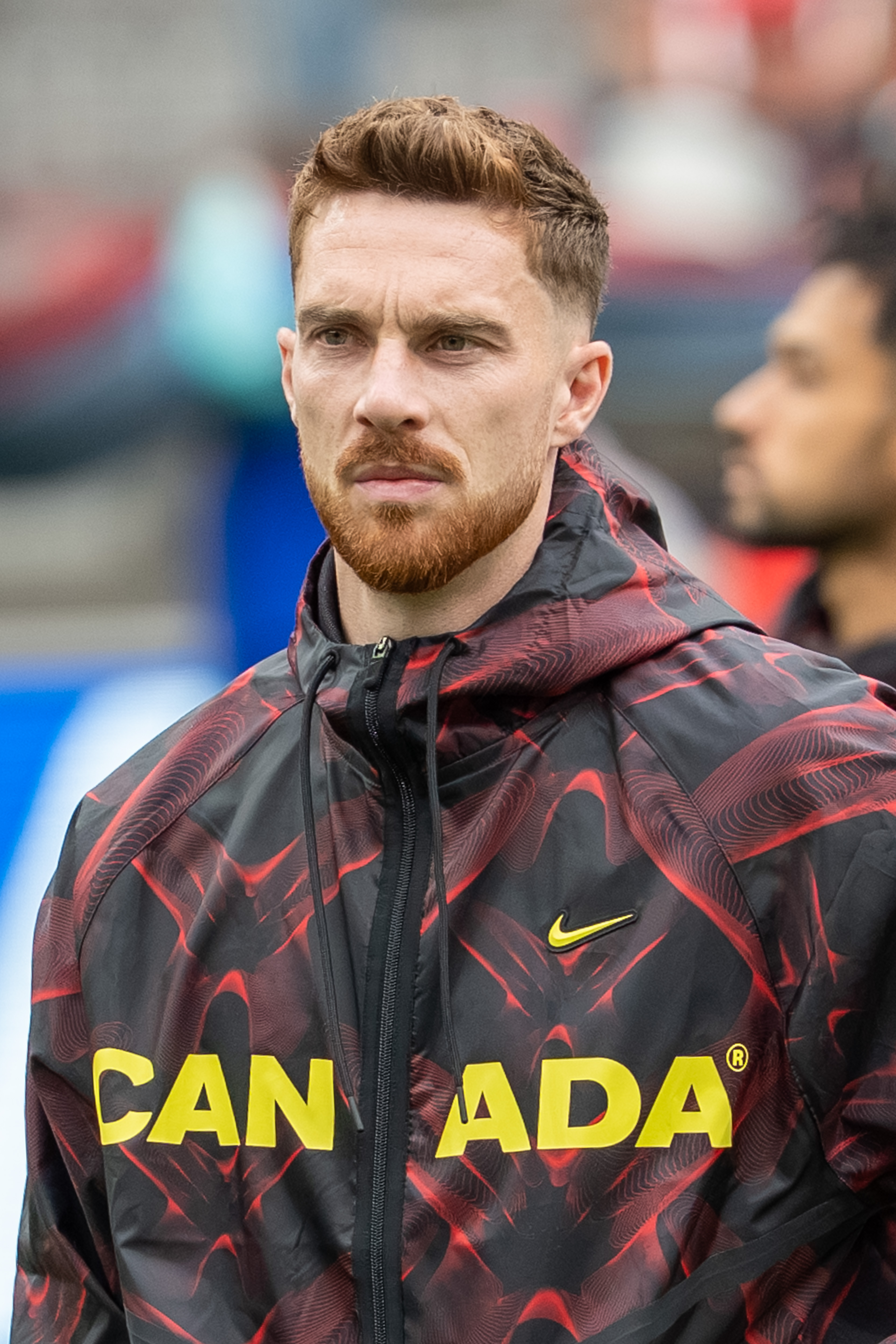
- Waterman with Canada in 2026

Personal information
- Full name: Joel Robert Waterman
- Date of birth: January 24, 1996 (age 30)
- Place of birth: Surrey, British Columbia, Canada
- Height: 1.85 m (6 ft 1 in)
- Positions: Defender; defensive midfielder

Team information
- Current team: Portland Timbers
- Number: 2

Youth career
- Aldergrove Youth SC
- Langley United
- Surrey United SC

College career
Years	Team	Apps	(Gls)
2014–2019	Trinity Western Spartans	56	(9)

Senior career*
Years	Team	Apps	(Gls)
2016	Kitsap Pumas	11	(0)
2017	TSS FC Rovers	11	(0)
2018	Calgary Foothills	14	(0)
2019	Cavalry FC	21	(1)
2020–2025	CF Montréal (Note: Montreal Impact changed its name to CF Montréal in 2021)	130	(4)
2025–2026	Chicago Fire	21	(2)
2026–	Portland Timbers	10	(0)

International career^{‡}
2022–	Canada	19	(0)
- * Club domestic league appearances and goals as of November 7, 2026 ‡ National team caps and goals as of November 16, 2026

Joel Robert Waterman (born January 24, 1996) is a Canadian professional soccer player who plays as a centre-back, right-back or defensive midfielder for Portland Timbers of Major League Soccer and the Canada national team.

== Early life ==
Waterman began playing soccer at age five with Aldergrove Youth SC. At age 12, he joined Langley United. Afterwards, he played with Surrey United SC.

When he was 13, he made the British Columbia provincial team. In 2013, he represented British Columbia at the 2013 Canada Summer Games and also had a brief trial with the Vancouver Whitecaps Academy, but did not make the squad.

== University career ==
In 2014, he began attending Trinity Western University, where he played for the men's soccer team, committing to them when he was in Grade 11. Ahead of his fifth season, he was named the team captain, and helped them win a Canada West silver medal and finished fourth at the National Championship. He was also named a Canada West First Team All Star that season.

== Club career ==
=== Early career ===
In 2016, Waterman played in the US-based Premier Development League side Kitsap Pumas and made eleven league appearances, while also appearing in two US Open Cup matches. In 2017, Waterman played with Vancouver-based TSS FC Rovers in the PDL, where he made eleven appearances. In 2018, Waterman played for Calgary Foothills in the PDL, making fourteen league appearances and another three in the playoffs as Foothills won the PDL Championship.

=== Cavalry FC ===
At the 2018 CPL–U Sports Draft, Waterman was drafted in the second round by Cavalry FC on November 13, 2018. Initially, he had not planned on declaring for the draft, instead looking at potentially going to Europe or the United States, however, two days before the registration deadline, he decided to register. He officially signed with Cavalry on February 6, 2019.

Waterman made his professional debut for Cavalry in their inaugural game against York9 FC on May 4. He scored his first goal for Cavalry on October 5 against HFX Wanderers FC. He helped Cavalry win the Spring and Fall championships and helped them reach the CPL finals, where they finished second, where he was unable to play in the second leg after being sent off in the first leg for a hand ball. In December 2019, Cavalry announced Waterman would return to the club for the 2020 season.

=== CF Montréal ===
On January 14, 2020, Waterman transferred to Major League Soccer club Montreal Impact. With this transfer, Waterman made history as the first ever player from the Canadian Premier League to be sold to an MLS club. He made his debut for the Impact on February 19 against Saprissa in a CONCACAF Champions League match. He made his MLS debut for the Impact in their season opener against the New England Revolution on February 29. Upon completion of the 2021 MLS season, CF Montréal announced that they would be exercising the option on Waterman's contract for 2022.

In 2022, Waterman became a regular starter for the club. During the 2022 season, he scored his first goal for Montreal against Orlando City on May 7, netting the opener in an eventual 4–1 victory. On August 4, he scored in the fourth minute of stoppage time to secure a 2–1 win over the Columbus Crew. In March 2023 Waterman signed a new contract with Montreal through 2024, with an option for 2025. In November 2024, Waterman would sign a contract extension through the 2027 season, with an option for 2028.

=== Chicago Fire ===
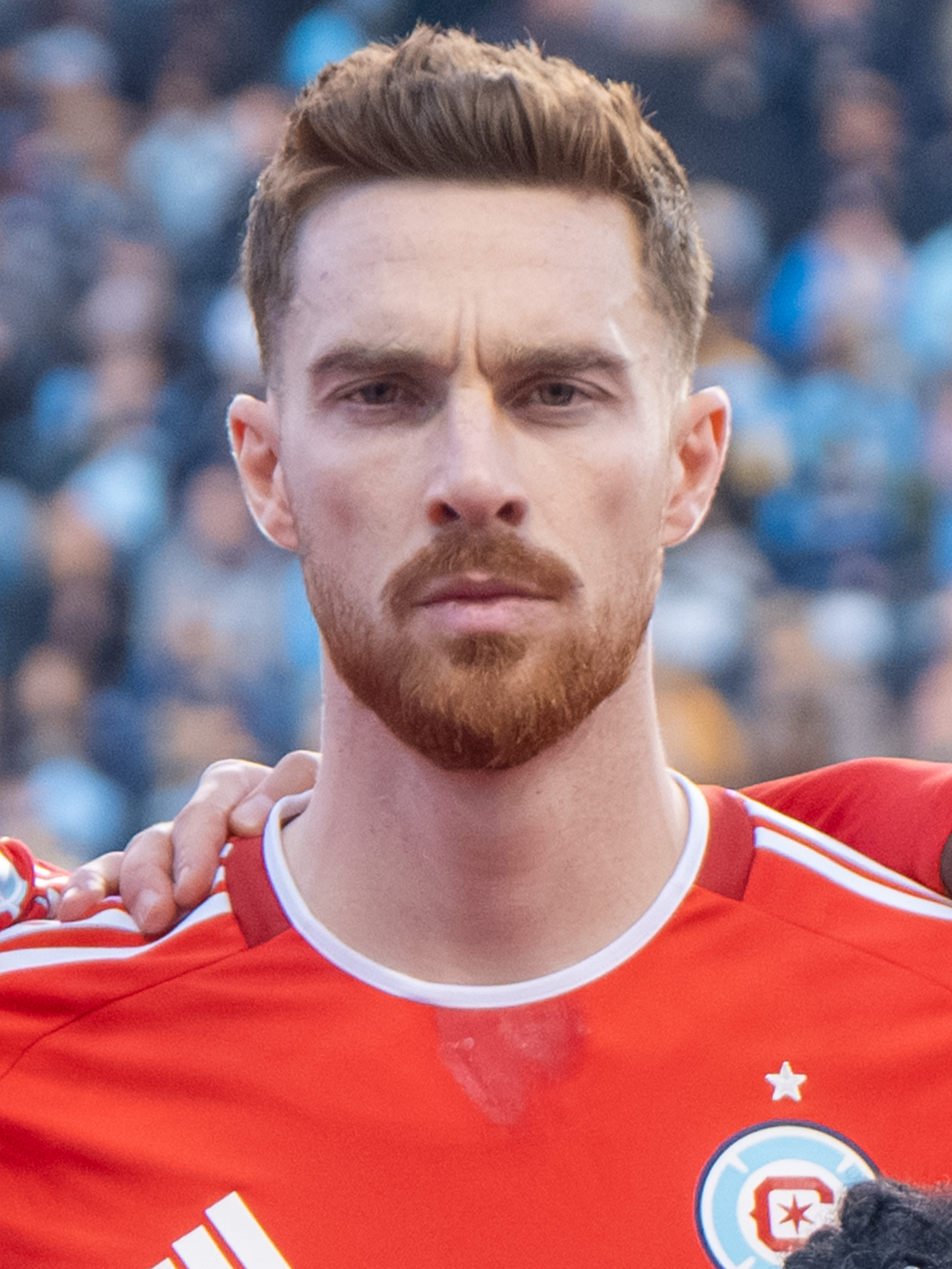
Waterman with the Chicago Fire in 2025

In August 2025, Waterman was traded to Chicago Fire FC in exchange for $500,000 in General Allocation Money and $100,000 in performance-based money. He made his debut for his new club on September 13 against New York City FC in a 3–1 defeat. Waterman scored his first goal for the Fire on September 20 against Minnesota United, netting the opening goal in an eventual 3–0 victory.

=== Portland Timbers ===
On September 3, 2026, the Portland Timbers signed Waterman from Chicago in exchange for $100,000 in General Allocation Money and up to $100,000 in performance-based money.

== International career ==
He was called up to the Canadian senior national team for the first time for a national team camp in January 2021. He earned several more call-ups to the squad during 2021 and 2022. On November 11, 2022, he made his debut for Canada in a friendly against Bahrain. On November 13, Waterman was named to Canada's squad for the 2022 FIFA World Cup.

In June 2024, Waterman was named to Canada's squad for the 2024 Copa América, as an injury replacement for Junior Hoilett. In July 2025, he was called up to Canada's team for the 2025 CONCACAF Gold Cup. In May 2026, Waterman was named to Canada's 26-man squad for the 2026 FIFA World Cup.

== Career statistics ==
=== Club ===
As of match played November 21, 2026

Appearances and goals by club, season and competition
Club	Season	League			Playoffs		National cup		Continental		Other		Total	
Club	Season	Division	Apps	Goals	Apps	Goals	Apps	Goals	Apps	Goals	Apps	Goals	Apps	Goals
Kitsap Pumas	2016	PDL	11	0	—		2	0	—		—		13	0
TSS FC Rovers	2017	PDL	11	0	—		—		—		—		11	0
Calgary Foothills FC	2018	PDL	14	0	3	0	—		—		—		17	0
Cavalry FC	2019	Canadian Premier League	21	1	1	0	3	0	—		—		25	1
CF Montréal	2020	Major League Soccer	7	0	0	0	—		3	0	—		10	0
CF Montréal	2021	Major League Soccer	22	0	—		3	0	—		—		25	0
CF Montréal	2022	Major League Soccer	30	3	2	0	1	0	3	0	—		36	3
CF Montréal	2023	Major League Soccer	28	1	0	0	3	0	—		2	0	33	1
CF Montréal	2024	Major League Soccer	25	0	1	0	1	0	—		3	0	30	0
CF Montréal	2025	Major League Soccer	18	0	0	0	3	1	—		3	0	24	1
CF Montréal	Total		130	4	3	0	11	1	6	0	8	0	158	5
Chicago Fire	2025	Major League Soccer	6	1	3	0	—		—		—		9	1
Chicago Fire	2026	Major League Soccer	15	1	—		2	0	—		3	0	20	1
Chicago Fire	Total		21	2	3	0	2	0	0	0	3	0	29	2
Portland Timbers	2026	Major League Soccer	10	0	1	0	—		—		—		11	0
Career total			218	7	11	0	18	1	6	0	11	0	264	8

=== International ===
As of match played November 16, 2026

Appearances and goals by national team and year
National team	Year	Apps	Goals
Canada	2022	2	0
Canada	2023	0	0
Canada	2024	4	0
Canada	2025	9	0
Canada	2026	4	0
Total		19	0

== Honours ==
=== Club ===
Calgary Foothills

- Premier Development League: 2018

Cavalry FC

- Canadian Premier League Finals
  - Runners-up: 2019
- Canadian Premier League (Regular season):
  - Champions: Spring 2019, Fall 2019

CF Montreal

- Canadian Championship: 2021
