= Bruno Lourenço =

Portuguese footballer

Personal information
- Full name: Bruno Miguel Ponces Lourenço
- Date of birth: 2 February 1998 (age 28)
- Place of birth: Lisbon, Portugal
- Height: 1.79 m (5 ft 10 in)
- Positions: Winger; attacking midfielder

Team information
- Current team: Olimpija Ljubljana
- Number: 8

Youth career
- 2006–2008: Sacavenense
- 2008–2017: Benfica

Senior career*
Years	Team	Apps	(Gls)
2017–2020	Aves	6	(0)
2017–2018	→ Montalegre (loan)	21	(2)
2020–2022	Estoril	49	(5)
2022–2024	Boavista	61	(9)
2024–2025	Amedspor	22	(4)
2025–2016	AVS	7	(0)
2026–	Olimpija Ljubljana	14	(0)

International career
2013–2014	Portugal U16	15	(2)
2014–2015	Portugal U17	13	(1)
2015	Portugal U18	3	(0)
- * Club domestic league appearances and goals as of 16:48, 14 June 2026 (UTC)

Bruno Miguel Ponces Lourenço (born 2 February 1998) is a Portuguese professional footballer who plays as a winger or attacking midfielder for Slovenian PrvaLiga club Olimpija Ljubljana.

== Club career ==
=== Aves ===
Lourenço was born in Lisbon. He played youth football with S.L. Benfica, from ages 10 to 19.

In the summer of 2017, Lourenço signed with Primeira Liga club C.D. Aves, being immediately loaned to lowly C.D.C. Montalegre. After his return to the former he made his league debut on 18 May 2019, coming on as a second-half substitute in a 2–1 away loss against C.D. Feirense.

Lourenço was mainly associated to the under-23 team during his spell at the Estádio do CD Aves.

=== Estoril ===
On 27 July 2020, Lourenço joined G.D. Estoril Praia of the Liga Portugal 2 on a three-year contract. He scored three goals in 23 matches in his first season, in a return to the top division as champions.

Lourenço scored his first goal in the Portuguese top tier on 23 August 2021, equalising an eventual 3–1 away win over F.C. Paços de Ferreira in injury time of the first half.

=== Boavista ===
On 14 June 2022, Lourenço agreed to a three-year deal at Boavista FC. He scored his first goals on 17 September, both of a 2–1 home defeat of Sporting CP including the decider from the penalty spot; his first goal in that game won the league's award for Goal of the Month, as did his long-range strike in a 4–2 loss at C.S. Marítimo on 2 April 2023.

=== Amedspor and AVS ===
On 19 July 2024, Lourenço joined Amed S.F.K. of the Turkish TFF First League. He returned to Portugal and its top flight in August 2025, on a one-year contract at AVS Futebol SAD; he severed his ties at the latter after five months, however, having totalled ten appearances and a goal in the Taça de Portugal, a 7–0 away rout of amateurs A.D. Fornos de Algodres in the third round.

=== Olimpija Ljubljana ===
On 16 January 2026, Lourenço signed a three-and-a-half-year contract with Slovenian PrvaLiga side NK Olimpija Ljubljana.

== International career ==
Lourenço earned 31 caps for Portugal at youth level. On 24 September 2014, he scored the only goal for the under-17 team as they defeated Turkey in qualification for the 2015 UEFA European Championship.

== Career statistics ==
As of match played 18 May 2024

Appearances and goals by club, season and competition
Club	Season	League			National cup		League cup		Total	
Club	Season	Division	Apps	Goals	Apps	Goals	Apps	Goals	Apps	Goals
Aves	2017–18	Primeira Liga	0	0	0	0	0	0	0	0
Aves	2018–19	Primeira Liga	1	0	0	0	0	0	1	0
Aves	2019–20	Primeira Liga	5	0	0	0	1	0	6	0
Aves	Total		6	0	0	0	1	0	7	0
Montalegre (loan)	2017–18	Campeonato de Portugal	21	2	0	0	—		21	2
Estoril	2020–21	Liga Portugal 2	23	3	5	0	0	0	28	3
Estoril	2021–22	Primeira Liga	26	2	2	0	2	0	30	2
Estoril	Total		49	5	7	0	2	0	58	5
Boavista	2022–23	Primeira Liga	29	4	1	0	4	1	34	5
Boavista	2023–24	Primeira Liga	32	5	2	1	1	0	35	6
Boavista	Total		61	9	3	1	5	1	69	11
Career total			137	16	10	1	8	1	155	18

== Honours ==
Estoril

- Liga Portugal 2: 2020–21

Individual

- Primeira Liga Goal of the Month: September 2022, April 2023
