= André Franco =

Portuguese footballer (born 1998)

Personal information
- Full name: André Filipe Russo Franco
- Date of birth: 12 April 1998 (age 28)
- Place of birth: Lisbon, Portugal
- Height: 1.77 m (5 ft 10 in)
- Position: Attacking midfielder

Team information
- Current team: Chicago Fire
- Number: 10

Youth career
- 2006–2017: Sporting CP
- 2015–2016: → Belenenses (loan)

Senior career*
Years	Team	Apps	(Gls)
2018–2022	Estoril	61	(13)
2022–2025	Porto	49	(3)
2025	→ Chicago Fire (loan)	6	(0)
2025–	Chicago Fire	2	(0)
- * Club domestic league appearances and goals as of 17 November 2026

André Filipe Russo Franco (born 12 April 1998) is a Portuguese professional footballer who plays as an attacking midfielder for Major League Soccer club Chicago Fire.

== Club career ==
=== Estoril ===
Born in Lisbon, Franco spent almost all of his youth career with local Sporting CP, with one year on loan to neighbouring C.F. Os Belenenses. In 2018 he signed with G.D. Estoril Praia, being assigned to the under-23 team.

Franco made his competitive debut with the main squad on 3 August 2019, coming on as a 69th-minute substitute in a 1–1 away draw against F.C. Paços de Ferreira in the second round of the Taça da Liga (penalty shootout loss). He played his first match in the LigaPro 15 days later, again from the bench, in the 1–2 home loss to S.C. Farense.

In the 2020–21 season, Franco scored once in 20 games to help the club return to the Primeira Liga as champions. He made his debut in the competition on 7 August 2021, starting and netting in the 2–0 win at F.C. Arouca. He scored a further ten goals during the campaign, as his team easily avoided relegation; one came in a 2–2 home draw with B-SAD on 24 April in which he, two teammates and as many opponents were sent off in a confrontation at the end.

=== Porto ===
On 4 August 2022, Franco joined FC Porto on a five-year contract, for €4 million. He debuted 24 days later in a 3–1 loss at Rio Ave F.C. as a late replacement for Iván Marcano. He scored his first goal on 10 September, coming off the bench to conclude a 3–0 home victory over G.D. Chaves with a close-range deflection.

Franco made a substitute appearance in the 2025 FIFA Club World Cup, in a 0–0 draw against SE Palmeiras in the group stage. During his spell at the Estádio do Dragão, he totalled 71 games and five goals.

=== Chicago Fire ===
On 13 August 2025, Franco moved to the Chicago Fire FC on a season-long loan. He provided two assists on his Major League Soccer home debut to help the hosts to beat the New England Revolution 3–2, and was named the game's MVP.

Franco enjoyed a positive start in Chicago, making four assists in his first five matches. However, on 1 October 2025, on an away fixture at Inter Miami CF, he suffered a serious knee injury. He agreed to a permanent deal on 7 November, signing a contract until 30 June 2028 which could be extended for a further six months; a €750.000 transfer fee was paid, which could rise to €1 million with add-ons in exchange for 50% of his economic rights.

== Career statistics ==
As of match played 1 October 2025

Appearances and goals by club, season and competition
Club	Season	League			National cup		League cup		Continental		Other		Total	
Club	Season	Division	Apps	Goals	Apps	Goals	Apps	Goals	Apps	Goals	Apps	Goals	Apps	Goals
Estoril	2019–20	LigaPro	8	1	1	1	1	0	—		—		10	2
Estoril	2020–21	Liga Portugal 2	20	1	3	0	1	1	—		—		24	2
Estoril	2021–22	Primeira Liga	33	11	3	0	2	0	—		—		38	11
Estoril	Total		61	13	7	1	4	1	—		—		72	15
Porto	2022–23	Primeira Liga	17	2	4	1	3	0	1 (Note: Appearances in UEFA Champions League)	0	0	0	25	3
Porto	2023–24	Primeira Liga	15	0	3	1	1	0	4	0	0	0	23	1
Porto	2024–25	Primeira Liga	17	1	1	0	2	0	2 (Note: Appearances in UEFA Europa League)	0	1 (Note: Appearance in FIFA Club World Cup)	0	23	1
Porto	Total		49	3	8	2	6	0	7	0	1	0	71	5
Chicago Fire (loan)	2025	Major League Soccer	6	0	0	0	—		—		—		6	0
Chicago Fire	2026	Major League Soccer	0	0	0	0	—		—		—		0	0
Career Total			116	16	15	3	10	1	7	0	1	0	149	20

== Honours ==
Estoril

- Liga Portugal 2: 2020–21

Porto

- Taça de Portugal: 2022–23, 2023–24
- Taça da Liga: 2022–23
- Supertaça Cândido de Oliveira: 2024
