= Djé D'Avilla =

Ivorian footballer (born 2003)

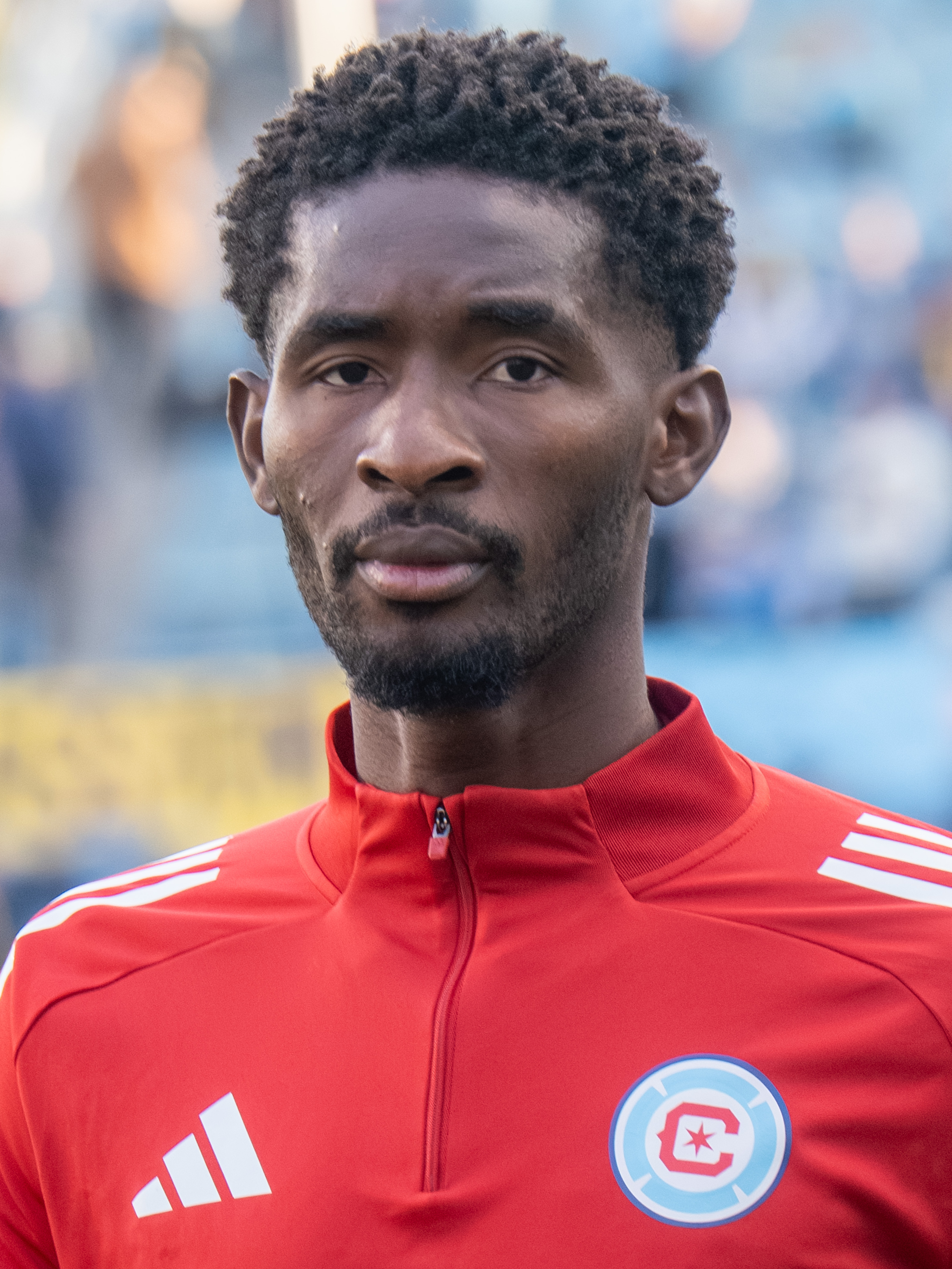
- D'Avilla with the Chicago Fire in 2025

Personal information
- Full name: Tah Ange Innocent D'Avilla Djé
- Date of birth: 5 May 2003 (age 23)
- Place of birth: Attécoubé, Ivory Coast
- Height: 1.91 m (6 ft 3 in)
- Position: Defensive midfielder

Team information
- Current team: Chicago Fire
- Number: 42

Senior career*
Years	Team	Apps	(Gls)
2020–2021	Stella Club		
2020–2021	→ LSAT (loan)		
2021–2022	Al-Hilal United		
2022–2025	União de Leiria	45	(0)
2023–2024	→ Académica (loan)	12	(0)
2025–	Chicago Fire	52	(3)
- * Club domestic league appearances and goals as of 23:18, 17 November 2026 (UTC)

Tah Ange Innocent D'Avilla Djé (born 5 May 2003) is an Ivorian professional footballer who plays as a defensive midfielder for Major League Soccer club Chicago Fire.

== Club career ==
D'Avilla began his career in the Ivory Coast with Stella Club d'Adjamé, going on loan to Lanfiara Sport Attécoué. After a year in the UAE with Al-Hilal United, he transferred to Portuguese side União de Leiria, where he played for three years as well as spending time on loan with Académica. In January 2025, D'Avilla had various reports linking him with a move to EFL Championship side Leeds United in a €4 million move, but the deal never materialised. On 1 April 2025, D'Avilla signed a four-year deal with Major League Soccer side Chicago Fire for an undisclosed fee.
