= Dylan Borso =

American soccer player (born 2006)

Personal information
- Full name: Dylan Beckett Borso
- Date of birth: June 6, 2006 (age 20)
- Place of birth: Chicago, Illinois, United States
- Height: 1.82 m (6 ft 0 in)
- Positions: Wing-back; winger; midfielder

Team information
- Current team: Greenock Morton (on loan from Chicago Fire)
- Number: 12

Youth career
- 2017–2024: Chicago Fire

College career
Years	Team	Apps	(Gls)
2024	Wake Forest Demon Deacons	24	(6)

Senior career*
Years	Team	Apps	(Gls)
2023–2026	Chicago Fire II	45	(5)
2026–	Chicago Fire	4	(0)
2026–	→ Greenock Morton (loan)	9	(4)

International career^{‡}
2025	United States U19		
2026–	United States U20	4	(0)
- * Club domestic league appearances and goals as of 20:06, 8 November 2026 (UTC) ‡ National team caps and goals as of 01:37, July 10, 2026 (UTC)

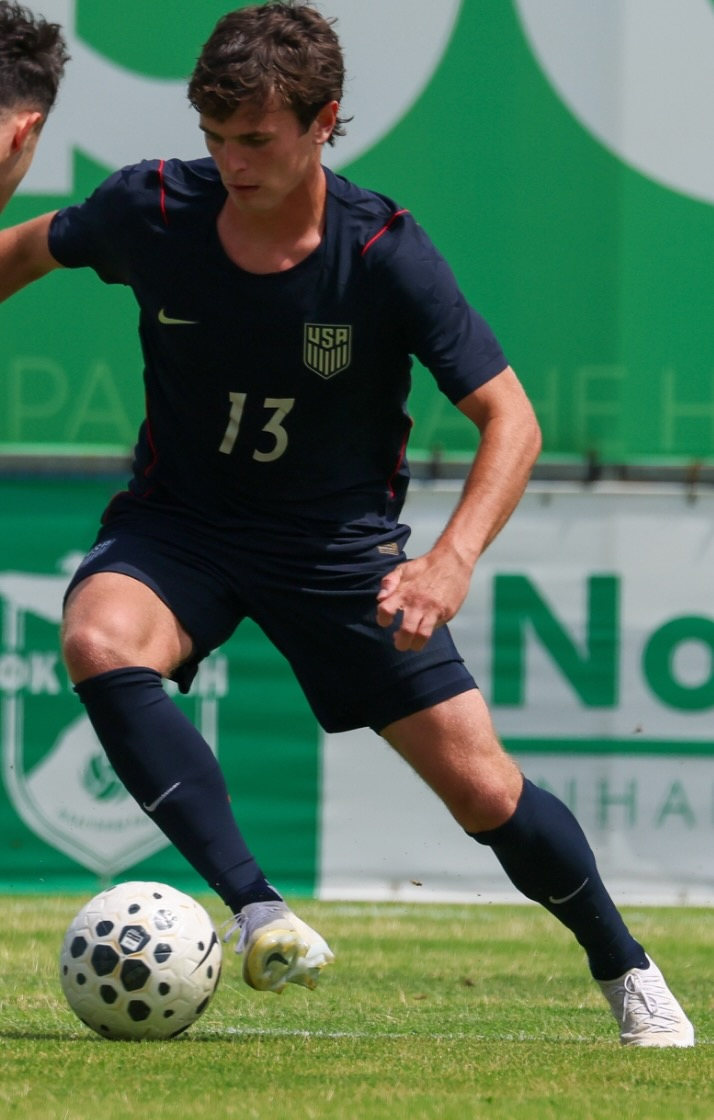
Dylan Borso with U20 USMNT in 2026

Dylan Borso (born June 2, 2006) is an American professional soccer player who plays as wing-back for Major League Soccer club Chicago Fire. Borso is currently on loan with Greenock Morton F.C. in the Scottish Championship through Jan 2027.

== Youth and College Career ==
Borso is a youth product of Chicago Fire MLS Academy since 2017. He scored his first professional goal in his first start with reserves on Sept. 10, 2023 and was named MLS Next Pro Rising Star of Matchday 26.

The highest ranked college commit in America for the Class of 2024 ... Borso attended Wake Forest for one semester recording a team-high assists ... Was named an ACC All-Freshman Team selection ... TDS Top 5 National Freshman ... Tallied an assist on Wake Forest’s game-winning goal against Syracuse (Nov. 6) in the first round of the ACC Tournament ... Recorded goals in NCAA Tournament victories against Maryland (Nov. 24) and Clemson (Dec. 1), as his strike against the Tigers 67 seconds into overtime eliminated the defending National Champions.

== Club career ==
Chicago Fire

Borso signed a Homegrown Contract with the Chicago Fire on December 20, 2024, until 2027 with options for 2028 and 2029. He debuted with the senior Chicago Fire team in a 1–1 fixture against Columbus Crew on Mar 7, 2026 in the 28th minute of the match, winning Man-of-the Match game ball honors from coach Gregg Berhalter.

Greenock Morton Loan

Borso joined the Scottish side on loan in September 2026.. On November 7, 2026, he scored four goals in a 4–3 victory over Stenhousemuir F.C. becoming the youngest player to score 4 goals in SPFL history. Two of the goals came after going down a man midway through first half.

== International career ==
Borso was called up to the United States U19s training camps in 2025 and the U20s for competition in Argentina and Bosnia where he played winger in 2026. Lionel Messi was pitch side for Borso's assist in the American's 3–0 victory against Argentina's U20s in Buenos Aires.
