= Loreintz Rosier =

French footballer (born 1998)

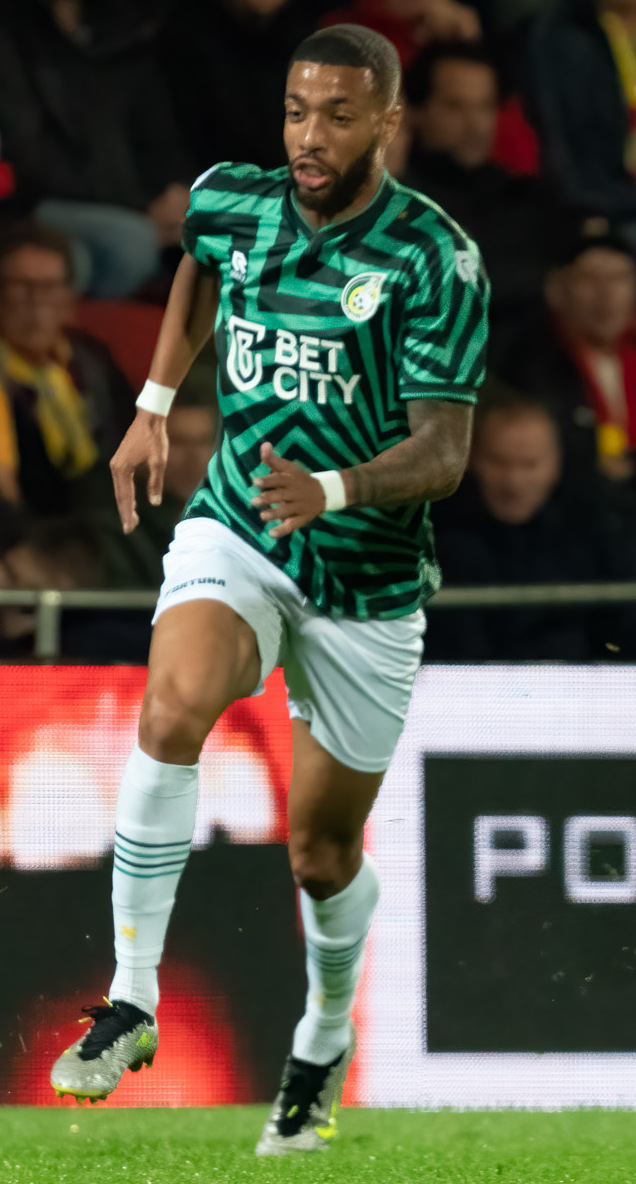

Personal information
- Date of birth: 14 August 1998 (age 28)
- Place of birth: Gonesse, France
- Height: 1.90 m (6 ft 3 in)
- Position: Defensive midfielder

Team information
- Current team: Abha
- Number: 32

Youth career
- Saint-Brice FC
- 2009–2010: FC Bourget
- 2010–2013: AAS Sarcelles
- 2013–2015: SM Caen
- 2016–2017: Paris FC

Senior career*
Years	Team	Apps	(Gls)
2015–2016	Saint-Brice FC		
2016–2017	Paris FC II	19	(4)
2017–2018	Sochaux II	24	(3)
2018–2020	Vitória Guimarães B	45	(5)
2020–2023	Estoril	71	(5)
2023–2025	Fortuna Sittard	61	(4)
2025–2026	Al-Hazem	31	(1)
2026–	Abha	4	(0)
- * Club domestic league appearances and goals as of 2 September 2026

Loreintz Rosier (born 14 August 1998) is a French professional footballer who plays as a defensive midfielder for Saudi Pro League club Abha.

== Career ==
=== Club career ===
Born at Gonesse in France, of Guadeloupean and Italian descent, Rosier started playing football at the age of 6 at Saint-Brice FC. He then moved to Le Bourget FC and later AAS Sarcelles to play at the highest youth level. Beside that, he also trained at INF Clairefontaine. In 2013, he signed a three-year youth contract with SM Caen, but decided to leave the club after two season following disputes. He then returned to his first club, Saint-Brice FC, where he played for the senior team in his first year U19 player. He then spent a season with Paris FC’s reserve team in the Championnat National 3 and also played for the club's U19s.

After a season with FC Sochaux' reserve team, Rosier moved to Portuguese club Vitória S.C. in the summer 2018, starting on the club's B-team. On 23 September 2018, Rosier made his professional debut with Vitória Guimarães B in a 2018–19 LigaPro match against Leixões.

In the summer 2020, Rosier moved to G.D. Estoril Praia.

On 18 July 2023, Rosier signed a two-year contract with Fortuna Sittard in the Netherlands.

On 27 August 2025, Rosier joined Saudi Arabian club Al-Hazem.
