= Hugo Cuypers =

Belgian footballer (born 1997)

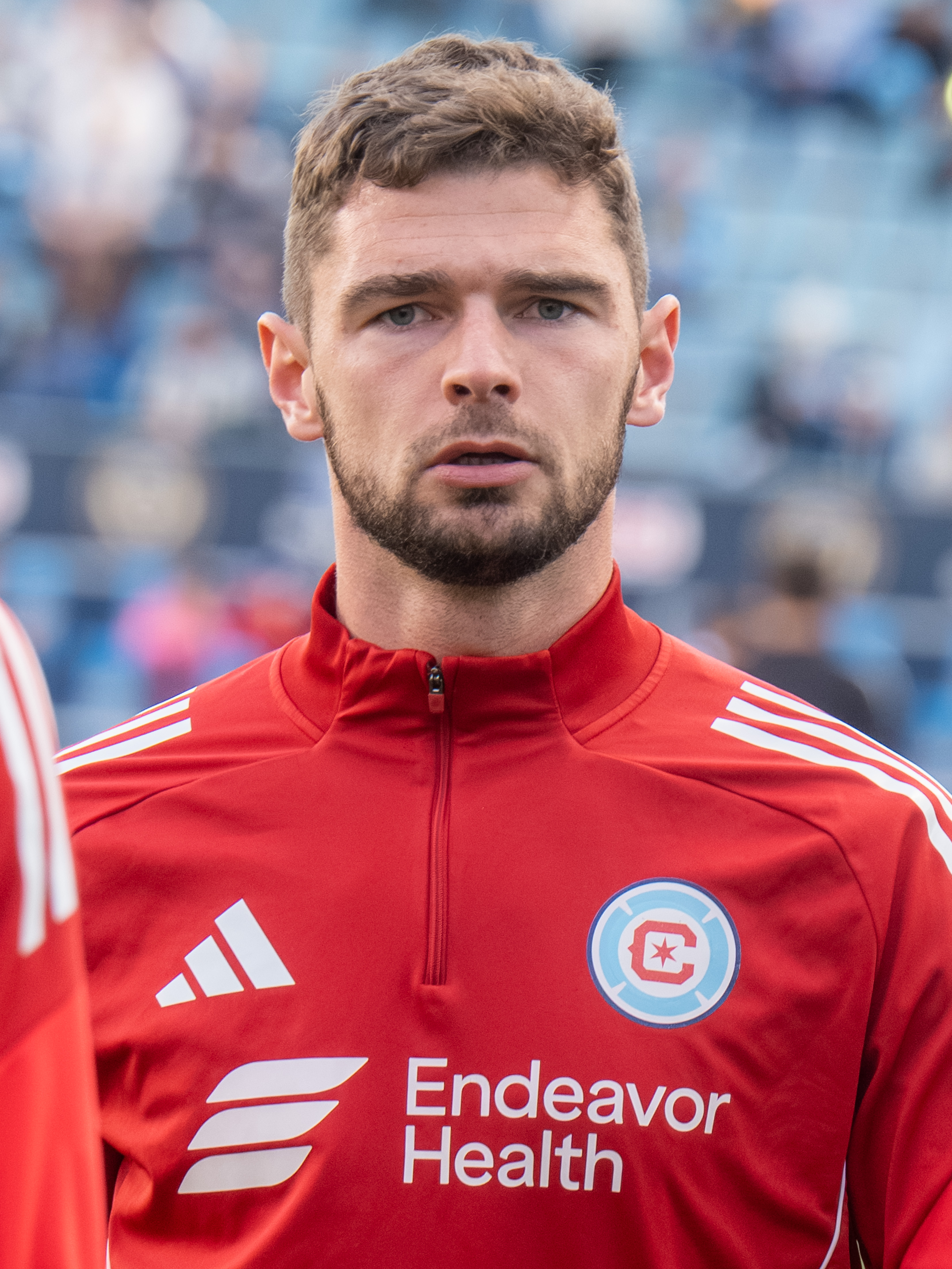
- Cuypers with Chicago Fire in 2025

Personal information
- Date of birth: 7 February 1997 (age 29)
- Place of birth: Liège, Belgium
- Height: 1.82 m (6 ft 0 in)
- Position: Striker

Team information
- Current team: Monterrey
- Number: 99

Youth career
- FC De Zwaluw Vechmaal
- −2012: Excelsior Veldwezelt
- 2012−2014: Visé
- 2014−2016: Standard Liège

Senior career*
Years	Team	Apps	(Gls)
2015–2017	Standard Liège	1	(0)
2016–2017	→ Seraing (loan)	19	(6)
2017–2018	Ergotelis	28	(22)
2019–2021	Olympiacos	10	(1)
2019–2020	→ Ajaccio (loan)	22	(5)
2021–2022	Mechelen	34	(13)
2022–2024	Gent	59	(33)
2024–2026	Chicago Fire	75	(40)
2026–	Monterrey	14	(6)

International career^{‡}
2016	Belgium U19	3	(1)
2026–	Belgium	1	(0)
- * Club domestic league appearances and goals as of 7 November 2026 ‡ National team caps and goals as of 12 November 2026

Hugo Cuypers (born 7 February 1997) is a Belgian professional footballer who plays as a striker for Liga MX club Monterrey and the Belgium national team.

== Club career ==
=== Youth ===
Cuypers began his career at Zwaluw Vechmaal, followed by fourth-tier Belgian side Excelsior Veldwezelt. When the latter went bankrupt in 2012, Cuypers moved to Visé. He played for Les Oies for three seasons, and was eventually picked up by Belgian top tier side Standard Liège in the summer of 2014, when Visé also went bankrupt.

=== Standard Liège ===
After his move to Les Rouches, Cuypers' made an impression in his debut season for the club's U−19 outfit, scoring 31 times and dishing out 13 assists. He added an additional 2 goals with Standard Liège U−21, thus drawing the interest of several European top clubs. In June 2015, Cuypers signed a new two-year contract with Standard Liège and made his professional debut on 3 April 2016, coming in as a late substitute for Renaud Emond during the play-off II home match versus Waasland-Beveren.

==== RFC Seraing (loan) ====
On 31 October 2016, Cuypers was loaned out to Belgian First Amateur Division side Seraing. He managed to score six goals in a total of nineteen caps during his loan spell.

=== Ergotelis ===
In the summer of 2017, Cuypers was acquired by Greek Football League side Ergotelis, owned by Egyptian businessman Maged Samy, who also owned Belgian second tier side Lierse at the time. Despite rumors of a possible loan move to Lierse, Cuypers signed a two-year contract with the Cretans and joined Ergotelis' pre-season build-up at Karpenisi.

During his first season with the Cretans, Cuypers became a permanent starter and made an immediate impact for his new club, scoring three goals in the first four matches of the 2017–18 Greek Football League during a 1−1 draw versus Chania − Kissamikos on 5 November 2017, a 2−1 loss versus Panachaiki on 12 November 2017, and a 3−2 loss versus Aris on 19 November 2017. Despite Ergotelis' rough start and early struggle to avoid relegation, Cuypers became the club's most prolific player, strongly following up on his early performances by scoring goals on a regular basis and eventually "victimizing" 14 out of the total 16 opponents faced by Ergotelis during the season. He had his first two-goal performance versus Veria on 21 January 2018, a feat he repeated on 1 April against fellow relegation candidates Panegialios during a decisive 5−1 home win for the Cretans. At the end of the first round, Cuypers had already scored 11 goals in 16 games and by match-day 27 he had tallied up 20 goals, almost single-handedly giving his club a chance of staying in the division. He became the first player to score over 20 goals for Ergotelis in one season in 12 years, a feat which earned Cuypers a spot in the club's list of all-time top-scorers in Greek professional division. On 20 May 2018, Cuypers scored his fourth brace during the season, in a 5−1 home win against Aiginiakos, which cemented his team's place above the relegation zone. After scoring 22 goals in 28 caps, Cuypers became the most productive player in club history in the competition, surpassing Ergotelis' all-time scoring legend Patrick Ogunsoto's 21-goal season performance in 2006. His performances reportedly drew the attention of several Greek top-tier clubs as a result, including newly crowned Super League champions AEK Athens, who reportedly placed a €380,000 bid for the player, along with offering two of the club's players on loan to the Cretans. However, despite reports of the two teams reaching a deal, the transfer fell through after both Cuypers and manager Jacques Lichtenstein gave statements to the Belgian press, which ruled out any transfer to AEK Athens, reportedly due to «lack of respect». He subsequently failed to report for Ergotelis' 2018−19 pre-season preparation and effectively placed himself out of the team.

=== Olympiacos ===
On 18 June 2019, Cuypers joined Olympiacos signing a three years' contract for an undisclosed fee. During the 2018–19 season, the Belgian forward didn't play in a single match for Ergotelis, as the Cretan club finished in fourth place of the Football League to miss out on promotion.

On 17 August 2019, Cuypers joined Ajaccio on a season-long loan from Olympiacos.

=== Mechelen ===
On 4 June 2021, Mechelen has announced Cuypers and according to the publications, Olympiacos will receive €1 million for the transfer, and will keep a 50% in a possible resale. On 14 June 2021, his transfer to Mechelen, in which he signed a four-year contract, was officially concluded, following an official announcement from Olympiacos.

=== Gent ===
On 14 June 2022, Cuypers signed a four-year contract with Gent.

In the year 2022 he scored 30 goals in 45 games, and in the year 2023 he scored 32 goals in 44 games. Entering the Top Ten of the top scorers of the year 2023

=== Chicago Fire ===
On 6 February 2024, Cuypers signed a contract with Major League Soccer team Chicago Fire FC through 2026 with an option for 2027 for a club record fee.

He finished his first season at the club with 10 goals in 31 matches, being the team's top scorer. He would also finish the 2025 season as the club's top scorer with 17 goals.

On 5 June 2026, Cuypers was named an MLS All-Star but did not ultimately feature in the game. In the first half of the 2026 season, Cuypers scored 13 goals in 11 matches, setting a Fire record by scoring in 10 consecutive matches in which he appeared.

Cuypers finished his time in Chicago with 44 goals and six assists in 82 matches across all competitions.

=== Monterrey ===
On 23 July 2026, Cuypers joined Liga MX club CF Monterrey for reported $7.5 million plus add-ons.

== International career ==
Cuypers has represented Belgium with the U−19 national team during the 2016 UEFA European Under-19 Championship qualification. He played in all three matches during the Elite round of the competition, scoring one goal vs. Bulgaria in his only match as a starter.

Cuypers was one of the players who were called-up with the Belgium national team by head coach Mark van Bommel for the UEFA Nations League matches against Turkey and Italy on 12 and 15 November 2026.

== Career statistics ==
=== Club ===
As of match played 7 November 2026

Appearances and goals by club, season and competition
Club	Season	League			National cup (Note: Includes Greek Cup, Coupe de France, Belgian Cup, U.S. Open Cup)		Continental		Other		Total	
Club	Season	Division	Apps	Goals	Apps	Goals	Apps	Goals	Apps	Goals	Apps	Goals
Standard Liège	2015–16	Belgian Pro League	1	0	0	0	—		—		1	0
Seraing (loan)	2016–17	Belgian First Amateur Division	19	6	0	0	—		—		19	6
Ergotelis	2017–18	Football League Greece	28	22	2	0	—		—		30	22
Ajaccio (loan)	2019–20	Ligue 2	22	5	1	0	—		—		23	5
Olympiacos	2020–21	Super League Greece	10	1	4	1	—		—		14	2
Mechelen	2021–22	Belgian Pro League	34	13	2	0	—		—		36	13
Gent	2022–23	Belgian Pro League	39	27	3	1	13 (Note: Two appearances in UEFA Europa League, eleven appearances and six goals in UEFA Europa Conference League)	6	1 (Note: Appearance in Belgian Super Cup)	0	56	34
Gent	2023–24	Belgian Pro League	20	6	3	1	11 (Note: Appearances in UEFA Europa Conference League)	10	—		34	17
Gent	Total		59	33	6	2	24	16	1	0	90	51
Chicago Fire	2024	MLS	31	10	—		—		0	0	31	10
Chicago Fire	2025	MLS	33	17	3	2	—		3 (Note: Appearances in MLS Cup playoffs)	2	39	21
Chicago Fire	2026	MLS	11	13	1	0	—		—		12	13
Chicago Fire	Total		75	40	4	2	—		3	2	82	44
Monterrey	2026–27	Liga MX	14	6	—		—		6 (Note: Appearances in Leagues Cup)	3	20	9
Career total			262	126	19	5	24	16	10	5	315	152

=== International ===
As of match played 12 November 2026

Appearances and goals by national team and year
National team	Year	Apps	Goals
Belgium	2026	1	0
Total		1	0

== Honours ==
Standard Liège

- Belgian Cup: 2015–16

Olympiacos

- Super League Greece: 2020–21

Individual

- Super League Greece 2 Best Foreign Player: 2017−18
- Belgian First Division A Top scorer: 2022–23
- Jean-Claude Bouvy Trophy: 2022–23
- MLS All-Star: 2026
