= Anton Salétros =

Swedish footballer (born 1996)

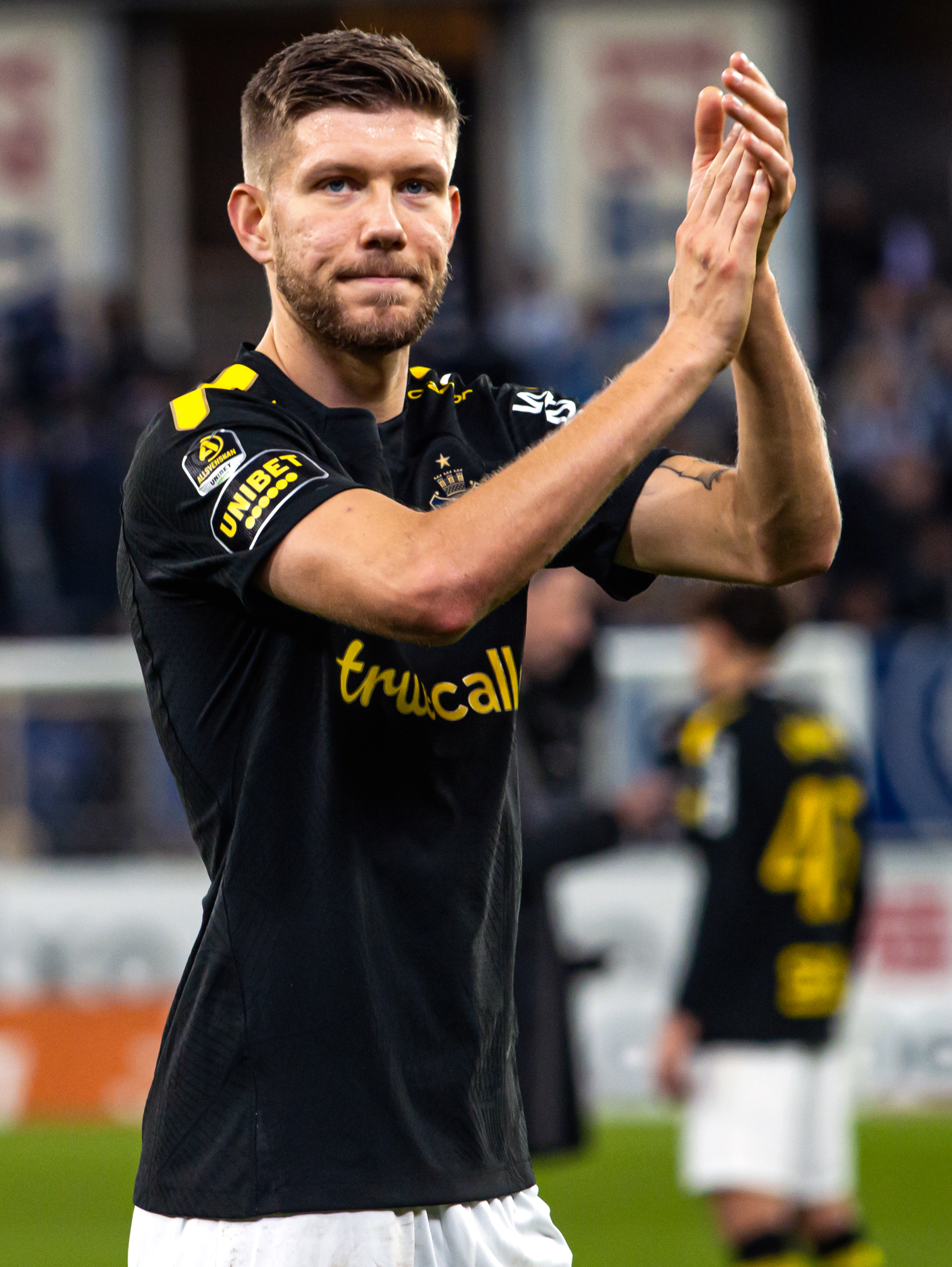
- Salétros with AIK in 2023

Personal information
- Full name: Anton Janos Jönsson Salétros
- Date of birth: 12 April 1996 (age 30)
- Place of birth: Stockholm, Sweden
- Height: 1.83 m (6 ft 0 in)
- Position: Midfielder

Team information
- Current team: Chicago Fire
- Number: 6

Youth career
- –2009: Enskede IK
- 2010–2013: AIK

Senior career*
Years	Team	Apps	(Gls)
2013–2018	AIK	77	(4)
2017	→ Újpest (loan)	5	(0)
2018–2020	Rostov	6	(0)
2019	→ AIK (loan)	26	(2)
2020	→ Sarpsborg 08 (loan)	10	(0)
2020–2022	Sarpsborg 08	63	(9)
2023	Caen	15	(1)
2023–2025	AIK	69	(6)
2026–	Chicago Fire	29	(2)

International career^{‡}
2011–2013	Sweden U17	28	(3)
2013–2015	Sweden U19	14	(0)
2015–2018	Sweden U21	8	(0)
2020–	Sweden	19	(1)
- * Club domestic league appearances and goals as of 23:08, 17 November 2026 (UTC) ‡ National team caps and goals as of 20:25, 14 October 2025 (UTC)

Anton Janos Jönsson Salétros (Hungarian pronunciation: [ˈɒnton ˈʃɒleːtroʃ]; Swedish pronunciation: [ˈanːtɔn saˈleːtrɔs]: born 12 April 1996) is a Swedish professional footballer who plays as a midfielder for Chicago Fire in Major League Soccer and for the Sweden national team.

== Club career ==
=== AIK ===
Born in Stockholm, Salétros started his career with local club Enskede IK before joining his home-town team AIK in 2010. On 31 August 2013, he made his debut with the first team squad in Sweden's top flight, Allsvenskan, replacing Ibrahim Moro against Gefle IF, in his only official appearance of that championship. In the following season he played 15 games, including 3 as a starter. On 25 April 2016 he scored his first league goal, with a shot from outside the area in a 2-1 win over IF Elfsborg.

In order to allow him to get more regular playing time, in August 2017 the AIK management chose to loan Salétros to the Hungarian side Újpest FC until 30 June 2018. With the Budapest team he made five appearances, before returning to AIK. In January 2018 he returned to AIK a few months before the loan expired, and played 12 league games, scoring 3 goals as AIK won the league title.

=== Rostov ===
On 6 June 2018, Salétros signed a four-year contract with the Russian Premier League club Rostov. He scored his first goal for the club on 26 September 2018 in a Russian Cup 4–0 victory over a third-tier club FC Syzran-2003.

==== loan to AIK ====
On 6 February 2019, he returned to AIK on loan until 30 June 2019. The loan was then extended to 31 December 2019. During the season he was a regular starter for AIK, appearing in 26 league matches and scored two goals.

=== Sarpsborg 08 ===
On 14 February 2020, Sarpsborg 08 announced that they had signed Salétros on a loan deal that kept him at the club till the end of July 2020.

On 5 October 2020, Sarpsborg 08 announced the signing of Salétros on a two-and-a-half-year contract, following his release by Rostov. On 8 November 2020, Salétros scored his first goal in the Norwegian top flight, Eliteserien, in a 3-2 loss to IK Start. Over the next few years Salétros was regarded as one of the top midfielders in Norway, appearing in 77 matches and scoring 11 goals.

=== Caen ===
After three seasons in Norway, on 2 January 2023, Salétros joined French club Caen on a free transfer, signing a deal until June 2025. On 3 February 2023, Salétros scored his first goal in Ligue 2, scoring the opening goal in a 3-1 victory over SC Bastia.

=== Return to AIK ===
On 9 July 2023, it was announced that Salétros would return to AIK on a deal until 31 December 2026. Upon his return to AIK, on 17 July 2023, he was instrumental in both goals in the 2-1 away win against Varbergs BoIS. The following year he was one of three candidates for the 2024 Allsvenskan midfielder of the year award. In November 2025, it was official that Salétros was sold to MLS and will be leaving the club after that 2025 Allsvenskan season.

=== Chicago Fire ===
On 7 November 2025, Chigaco Fire in Major Legaue Soccer announced the signing of Salétros on a contract until 2028, effective from 26 January 2026.

== International career ==
Salétros was a part of the Sweden U17 team that finished third at the 2013 FIFA U-17 World Cup.

He made his senior international debut for the Sweden national team in a friendly game against Kosovo on 12 January 2020.

On 10 June 2025, Salétros scored his first senior international goal, a direct free-kick, for Sweden in a 4–3 friendly victory against Algeria.

== Personal life ==
Anton Salétros grew up in Farsta, Stockholm Municipality to a Swedish mother and a Hungarian father. Salétros is a boyhood fan of AIK and began visit their home games from an early age. Salétros is also a supporter of Liverpool FC where his role model was Steven Gerrard. Salétros was in a relationship with Sweden women international Johanna Rytting Kaneryd from 2018 to 2024.

== Style of Play ==
Salétros operates normally as a classic central-midfield-playmaker but can be deployed at all positions on the midfield, including as a box-to-box midfielder, deep-lying playmaker, wide-midfielder but most regularly as an classic central midfielder. Salétros is known for his passing accuracy and teamplay.

== Career statistics ==
=== Club ===
As of 13 November 2022

Appearances and goals by club, season and competition
Club	Season	League			Cup		Europe		Total	
Club	Season	Division	Apps	Goals	Apps	Goals	Apps	Goals	Apps	Goals
AIK	2013	Allsvenskan	1	0	—		—		1	0
AIK	2014	Allsvenskan	15	0	1	0	4	0	20	0
AIK	2015	Allsvenskan	20	0	2	1	4	0	26	1
AIK	2016	Allsvenskan	19	1	4	0	5	0	28	1
AIK	2017	Allsvenskan	10	0	0	0	5	0	15	0
AIK	Total		65	1	7	1	18	0	90	2
Újpest (loan)	2017–18	Nemzeti Bajnokság I	5	0	0	0	—		5	0
AIK	2018	Allsvenskan	12	3	2	0	0	0	14	3
Rostov	2018–19	Russian Premier League	6	0	3	1	—		9	1
AIK (loan)	2019	Allsvenskan	26	2	1	0	8	0	35	2
Sarpsborg 08 (loan)	2020	Eliteserien	10	0	0	0	—		10	0
Sarpsborg 08	2020	Eliteserien	9	1	0	0	—		9	1
Sarpsborg 08	2021	Eliteserien	26	3	2	2	—		28	5
Sarpsborg 08	2022	Eliteserien	28	5	2	0	—		30	5
Sarpsborg 08	Total		73	9	4	2	0	0	77	11
Caen	2022–23	Ligue 2	15	1	0	0	—		15	1
AIK	2023	Allsvenskan	16	1	6	1	0	0	22	2
AIK	2024	Allsvenskan	27	3	1	1	0	0	28	4
AIK	Total		43	4	7	2	0	0	50	6
Career total			245	20	24	6	26	0	295	26

=== International ===
Appearances and goals by national team and year
National team	Year	Apps	Goals
Sweden	2020	1	0
Sweden	2021	0	0
Sweden	2022	0	0
Sweden	2023	0	0
Sweden	2024	10	0
Sweden	2025	8	1
Total		19	1

Scores and results list Sweden's goal tally first, score column indicates score after each Salétros goal.

List of international goals scored by Anton Salétros
No.	Date	Venue	Opponent	Score	Result	Competition	Ref.
1	10 June 2025	Strawberry Arena, Solna, Sweden	Algeria	4–0	4–3	Friendly	

== Honours ==
AIK

- Allsvenskan; 2018

Sweden U17

- FIFA U-17 World Cup third place: 2013
