= 2023 Chicago Fire FC season =

Chicago Fire FC
2023 season
- Chairman: Joe Mansueto
- Head coach: Ezra Hendrickson (until May 8); Frank Klopas (from May 8)
- Stadium: Soldier Field (capacity: 61,500)
- MLS: Conference: 13th Overall: 24th
- MLS Cup Playoffs: Did not qualify
- U.S. Open Cup: Quarterfinals
- Leagues Cup: Round of 32
- Highest home attendance: October 4 vs Miami (62,124)
- Lowest home attendance: March 18 vs FC Cincinnati (7,815)
- Average home league attendance: 18,170
| Home colors | Away colors |

The 2023 Chicago Fire FC season was the club's 25th year of existence, as well as their 26th in Major League Soccer. On May 8, 2023, the Fire formally fired their head coach Ezra Hendrickson and assistant coach Junior Gonzalez after the club went 2-3-5 through their first ten games. Assistant coach Frank Klopas was named interim coach for the third time in his career, following stints in 2011 (which led to him retaining the job for two more years) and 2021. Notably, the Fire saw their largest turnout in club history on the October 4 match against Inter Miami, selling out Soldier Field with 62,124 in attendance. The Fire would ultimately miss the playoffs for the sixth consecutive season, the second longest streak in MLS history.

== Current squad ==
Players signed as of September 10, 2023

| No. | Name | Nationality | Position | Date of birth (age) | Previous club | Player Notes |
Goalkeepers
| 18 | Spencer Richey | (United States) | G | May 30, 1992 (aged 31) | (United States) Seattle Sounders FC | |
| 25 | Jeff Gal | (United States) | G | April 6, 1993 (aged 30) | (Sweden) Degerfors IF | |
| 34 | Chris Brady | (United States) | G | March 3, 2004 (aged 19) | (United States) Chicago Fire Academy | Homegrown |
Defenders
| 2 | Arnaud Souquet | (France) | D | February 12, 1992 (aged 31) | (France) Montpellier HSC | International |
| 3 | Alonso Aceves | (Mexico) | D | March 28, 2001 (aged 22) | (Mexico) Pachuca | International; U-22 |
| 4 | Carlos Terán | (Colombia) | D | September 24, 2000 (aged 23) | (Colombia) Envigado F.C. | |
| 5 | Rafael Czichos | (Germany) | D | May 14, 1990 (aged 33) | (Germany) 1. FC Köln | Captain; International |
| 6 | Miguel Navarro | (Venezuela) | D | February 26, 1999 (aged 24) | (Venezuela) Deportivo La Guaira F.C. | |
| 16 | Wyatt Omsberg | (United States) | D | September 21, 1995 (aged 28) | (United States) Minnesota United FC | |
| 22 | Mauricio Pineda | (United States) | D | October 17, 1997 (aged 26) | (United States) North Carolina Tar Heels | |
| 24 | Jonathan Dean | (United States) | D | May 15, 1997 (aged 26) | (United States) Birmingham Legion FC | |
| 27 | Kendall Burks | (United States) | D | October 8, 1999 (aged 24) | (United States) Washington Huskies | |
| 36 | Justin Reynolds | (United States) | D | April 8, 2004 (aged 19) | (United States) Chicago Fire FC II | Homegrown |
Midfielders
| 7 | Maren Haile-Selassie | (Switzerland) | M | March 13, 1999 (aged 24) | (Switzerland) FC Lugano | International; Loaned In |
| 10 | Xherdan Shaqiri | (Switzerland) | M | October 10, 1991 (aged 32) | (France) Olympique Lyonnais | Designated Player; International |
| 17 | Brian Gutiérrez | (United States) | M | June 17, 2003 (aged 20) | (United States) Chicago Fire Academy | Homegrown |
| 21 | Fabian Herbers | (Germany) | M | August 17, 1993 (aged 30) | (United States) Philadelphia Union | |
| 26 | Ousmane Doumbia | (Ivory Coast) | M | May 21, 1992 (aged 31) | (Switzerland) FC Lugano | International; Loaned In; Designated Player |
| 30 | Gastón Giménez | (Paraguay) | M | July 27, 1991 (aged 32) | (Argentina) Vélez Sarsfield | |
| 31 | Federico Navarro | (Argentina) | M | March 9, 2000 (aged 23) | (Argentina) Talleres de Cordoba | International; U-22 Initiative |
| 35 | Sergio Oregel | (United States) | M | May 16, 2005 (aged 18) | (United States) Chicago Fire Academy | Homegrown |
| 37 | Javier Casas | (United States) | M | May 14, 2003 (aged 20) | (United States) Chicago Fire Academy | Homegrown |
| 38 | Alex Monis | (United States) | M | March 20, 2003 (aged 20) | (United States) Chicago Fire Academy | Homegrown; Loaned Out |
| 39 | Allan Rodriguez | (United States) | M | May 27, 2004 (aged 19) | (United States) Chicago Fire Academy | Homegrown; Loaned Out |
Forwards
| 8 | Chris Mueller | (United States) | F | August 29, 1996 (aged 27) | (Scotland) Hibernian F.C. | |
| 11 | Kacper Przybyłko | (Poland) | F | March 25, 1993 (aged 30) | (United States) Philadelphia Union | |
| 19 | Georgios Koutsias | (Greece) | F | February 8, 2004 (aged 19) | (Greece) PAOK FC | International; U-22 |
| 20 | Jairo Torres | (Mexico) | F | July 5, 2000 (aged 23) | (Mexico) Atlas F.C. | International; Young DP |
| 23 | Kei Kamara | (Sierra Leone) | F | September 1, 1984 (aged 39) | (Canada) CF Montréal | |
| 32 | Missael Rodriguez | (United States) | F | February 9, 2003 (aged 20) | (United States) Chicago Fire Academy | Homegrown |
| 33 | Victor Bezerra | (United States) | F | February 5, 2000 (aged 23) | (United States) Indiana Hoosiers | Homegrown |

== Player movement ==
=== Returning, options, and new contracts ===
| Date | Player | Position | Notes | Ref |
|---|---|---|---|---|
| October 31, 2022 | (United States) Kendall Burks | D | Option for 2023 exercised | |
| October 31, 2022 | (United States) Wyatt Omsberg | D | Option for 2023 exercised | |
| April 29, 2023 | (Colombia) Carlos Terán | D | Signed a new contract through 2026 with an option for 2027 | |
| May 24, 2023 | (United States) Mauricio Pineda | D | Signed a new contract through 2026 with an option for 2027 | |

=== In ===
| Date | Player | Position | Previous club | Notes | Ref |
|---|---|---|---|---|---|
| May 12, 2022 | (United States) Justin Reynolds | D | (United States) Chicago Fire FC II | Signed to a homegrown contract through 2026 with an option for 2027 | |
| January 9, 2023 | (France) Arnaud Souquet | D | (France) Montpellier HSC | Signed as a free agent through 2025 | |
| January 11, 2023 | (United States) Jeff Gal | G | (Sweden) Degerfors IF | Signed as a free agent through 2023 with options for 2024 and 2025 | |
| January 12, 2023 | (United States) Jonathan Dean | D | (United States) Birmingham Legion FC | Acquired from Birmingham through 2023 with options for 2024 and 2025 | |
| February 24, 2023 | (Sierra Leone) Kei Kamara | F | (Canada) CF Montréal | Acquired from Montréal for the 2023 season in exchange for $250k in GAM over 2023 and 2024 along with up to $150k in performance-related GAM | |
| February 28, 2023 | (Greece) Georgios Koutsias | F | (Greece) PAOK | Acquired as a U-22 roster slot player on a contract through 2026 with an option for 2027 | |

=== Loaned In ===
| Date | Player | Position | Loaning Club | Notes | Ref |
|---|---|---|---|---|---|
| December 27, 2022 | (Switzerland) Maren Haile-Selassie | M | (Switzerland) FC Lugano | Loaned for 2023 with an option to buy | |
| March 15, 2023 | (Mexico) Alonso Aceves | D | (Mexico) Pachuca | Loaned for 2023 with an option to buy | |
| June 28, 2023 | (Ivory Coast) Ousmane Doumbia | M | (Switzerland) FC Lugano | Loaned in as a designated player for the rest of 2023 with an option to buy | |

=== Out ===
| Date | Player | Position | Destination Club | Notes | Ref |
|---|---|---|---|---|---|
| December 31, 2022 | (United States) Gabriel Slonina | G | (England) Chelsea | End of loan following being sold to Chelsea on August 2, 2022 | |
| October 31, 2022 | (United States) Jonathan Bornstein | D | (Honduras) Vida | Out of contract | |
| October 31, 2022 | (United States) Andre Reynolds II | D | Retired | Option declined | |
| October 31, 2022 | (Slovakia) Boris Sekulić | D | (Poland) Górnik Zabrze | Out of contract | |
| December 27, 2022 | (Ecuador) Jhon Espinoza | D | (Switzerland) FC Lugano | Mutually agreed to terminate contract, allowing Espinoza to join FC Lugano | |
| January 13, 2023 | (Bulgaria) Stanislav Ivanov | F | (Bulgaria) FC Arda Kardzhali | Mutually agreed to terminate contract | |
| January 16, 2023 | (Colombia) Jhon Durán | F | (England) Aston Villa | Sold for a reported club-record of $18 million with up to $4 million in add-ons and a sell-on fee. | |

=== Loaned out ===
| Date | Player | Position | Destination Club | Notes | Ref |
|---|---|---|---|---|---|
| September 6, 2023 | (United States) Alex Monis | M | (United States) Rio Grande Valley FC | Loaned to Rio Grande Valley for the remainder of the USL Season | |

=== Second team movement ===
| Player | Position | Movement | Notes | Ref |
|---|---|---|---|---|
| (United States) Allan Rodriguez | MF | Sent to Fire II | Was not listed in the Fire's official app roster, and did not participate in preseason with the first team. | |
| (United States) Charlie Ostrem | DF | Loaned to the first team | Signed to a short-term loan for the June 3 game against Cincinnati and then again for the June 21 match against Portland | |

=== Unsigned draft picks and trialists ===
| Pick | Player | Position | Previous club | Notes | Ref |
|---|---|---|---|---|---|
| Draftee (Note: Draft Pick R3, P64) | (United States) Noah Egan | D | (United States) Vermont Catamounts | Signed with Chicago Fire II | |
| Draftee (Note: Draft Pick R3, P67) | (United States) Billy Hency | D | (United States) Loyola Ramblers | Signed with Chicago Fire II | |
| Draftee (Note: Draft Pick R3, P76) | (Colombia) Wilmer Cabrera Jr. | M | (United States) Butler Bulldogs | Signed with Rio Grande Valley FC | |
| Trialist | (Germany) Paul Kruse | G | (United States) Creighton Bluejays | | |

Additionally, Fire II defender Charlie Ostrem and goalkeeper Mihajlo Mišković trained with the Fire during preseason.

== Technical staff ==
| Position | Staff |
|---|---|
| Sporting Director | (Switzerland) Georg Heitz |
| Technical Director | (Germany) Sebastian Pelzer |
| Head Coach | (Saint Vincent and the Grenadines) Ezra Hendrickson (Until May 8) |
| Head Coach | (United States) Frank Klopas (From May 8) |
| Assistant Coach | (United States) Frank Klopas (Until May 8) |
| Assistant Coach | (United States) Junior Gonzalez (Until May 8) |
| Assistant Coach | (United States) C. J. Brown |
| Assistant Coach | (Greece) Nikos Kostenoglou (From August 17) |
| Assistant Coach | (Greece) Theodoros Antonopoulos (From August 17) |
| Goalkeeping Coach | (United States) Zach Thornton |

Last updated: May 8, 2023
Source: Chicago Fire Technical Staff

== Competitions ==
=== Major League Soccer ===
==== Eastern Conference table ====
MLS Eastern Conference table (2023)
| Pos | Team | Pld | W | L | T | GF | GA | GD | Pts | Qualification |
|---|---|---|---|---|---|---|---|---|---|---|
| 1 | FC Cincinnati | 34 | 20 | 5 | 9 | 57 | 39 | +18 | 69 | MLS Cup Round One |
| 2 | Orlando City SC | 34 | 18 | 7 | 9 | 55 | 39 | +16 | 63 | MLS Cup Round One |
| 3 | Columbus Crew | 34 | 16 | 9 | 9 | 67 | 46 | +21 | 57 | MLS Cup Round One |
| 4 | Philadelphia Union | 34 | 15 | 9 | 10 | 57 | 41 | +16 | 55 | MLS Cup Round One |
| 5 | New England Revolution | 34 | 15 | 9 | 10 | 58 | 46 | +12 | 55 | MLS Cup Round One |
| 6 | Atlanta United FC | 34 | 13 | 9 | 12 | 66 | 53 | +13 | 51 | MLS Cup Round One |
| 7 | Nashville SC | 34 | 13 | 11 | 10 | 39 | 32 | +7 | 49 | MLS Cup Round One |
| 8 | New York Red Bulls | 34 | 11 | 13 | 10 | 36 | 39 | −3 | 43 | MLS Cup Wild Card |
| 9 | Charlotte FC | 34 | 10 | 11 | 13 | 45 | 52 | −7 | 43 | MLS Cup Wild Card |
| 10 | CF Montréal | 34 | 12 | 17 | 5 | 36 | 52 | −16 | 41 | |
| 11 | New York City FC | 34 | 9 | 11 | 14 | 35 | 39 | −4 | 41 | |
| 12 | D.C. United | 34 | 10 | 14 | 10 | 45 | 49 | −4 | 40 | |
| 13 | Chicago Fire FC | 34 | 10 | 14 | 10 | 39 | 51 | −12 | 40 | |
| 14 | Inter Miami CF | 34 | 9 | 18 | 7 | 41 | 54 | −13 | 34 | |
| 15 | Toronto FC | 34 | 4 | 20 | 10 | 26 | 59 | −33 | 22 | |

Source: MLS
Rules for classification: 1) points; 2) total wins; 3) total goal differential; 4) total goals scored; 5) fewer disciplinary points; 6) away goal differential; 7) away goals scored; 8) home goals differential; 9) home goals scored; 10) coin toss (2 clubs tied) or drawing of lots (≥3 clubs tied)

==== Overall table ====
Overall MLS standings table
| Pos | Team | Pld | W | L | T | GF | GA | GD | Pts |
|---|---|---|---|---|---|---|---|---|---|
| 22 | New York City FC | 34 | 9 | 11 | 14 | 35 | 39 | −4 | 41 |
| 23 | D.C. United | 34 | 10 | 14 | 10 | 45 | 49 | −4 | 40 |
| 24 | Chicago Fire FC | 34 | 10 | 14 | 10 | 39 | 51 | −12 | 40 |
| 25 | Austin FC | 34 | 10 | 15 | 9 | 49 | 55 | −6 | 39 |
| 26 | LA Galaxy | 34 | 8 | 14 | 12 | 51 | 67 | −16 | 36 |

Source: MLS
Rules for classification: 1) points; 2) total wins; 3) total goal differential; 4) total goals scored; 5) fewer disciplinary points; 6) away goal differential; 7) away goals scored; 8) home goals differential; 9) home goals scored; 10) coin toss (2 clubs tied) or drawing of lots (≥3 clubs tied)

==== Results summary ====
| Overall | | | | | | | | Home | | | | | | Away | | | | | |
| Pld | Pts | W | L | T | GF | GA | GD | W | L | T | GF | GA | GD | W | L | T | GF | GA | GD |
|---|---|---|---|---|---|---|---|---|---|---|---|---|---|---|---|---|---|---|---|
| 34 | 39 | 10 | 15 | 9 | 39 | 51 | −12 | 6 | 5 | 6 | 26 | 22 | +4 | 4 | 10 | 3 | 13 | 29 | −16 |

Last updated: October 21
Source: MLSsoccer.com standings
Pld = Matches played; Pts = Points; W = Matches won; T = Matches tied; L = Matches lost; GF = Goals for; GA = Goals against; GD = Goal difference

==== Match results ====
===== Preseason =====
| January 31 | Cancún F.C. (Mexico) | 0–5 | (United States) Chicago Fire | Cancún, Mexico |
| 9:30 | | | Przybyłko; Torres; M. Rodriguez; Bezerra | Stadium: Estadio Andrés Quintana Roo |

| February 8 | Chicago Fire | 4–0 | Sacramento Republic | Tucson, Arizona |
| 19:00 | 17' Carlos Terán; 57' Sergio Oregel; 79' M. Rodriguez; 86' (pen.) Xherdan Shaqiri | | | Stadium: Kino Sports Complex |

| February 11 | Chicago Fire | 0–0 | Colorado Springs Switchbacks | Tucson, Arizona |
| 16:00 | | | | Stadium: Kino Sports Complex |

| February 15 | Chicago Fire | 3–3 | New Mexico United | Tucson, Arizona |
| 13:00 | 35' Bezerra; 76' Monis; 77' Pineda | | 12' Moreno; 56', 60' Dolling | Stadium: Kino Sports Complex |

| February 18 | Chicago Fire | 0–3 | Real Salt Lake | Tucson, Arizona |
| 12:00 | | | 22' Ojeda; 40', 44' Savarino | Stadium: Kino Sports Complex |

| February 25 | Chicago Fire | 3–0 | Indy Eleven | Bridgeview, Illinois |
| | 13' Rodriguez; 86' Haile-Selassie; 88' Bezerra | | | Stadium: SeatGeek Stadium |

===== Regular season =====
| March 4 1 | Chicago Fire | 1–1 | New York City FC | Chicago, Illinois |
| 20:30 | (yellow card) 34' Pineda; 75' Herbers | Report | 39' Perreira; (yellow card) 44' Pellegrini; (yellow card) 58' Jasson | Stadium: Soldier Field; Attendance: 19,671; Referee: Filip Dujic |

| March 11 2 | Philadelphia Union | 1–0 | Chicago Fire | Chester, Pennsylvania |
| 19:30 | (yellow card) 45+2' Martínez; (yellow card) 61' Elliott; (yellow card) 74' Bedoya; 90', (yellow card) 90+3' Torres; (yellow card) 96' Sullivan | Report | (yellow card) 12' Terán; (yellow card) 38, 94' (yellow-red card) Kamara; (yellow card) 42' M. Navarro; (yellow card) 45+2, 50' (yellow-red card) Herbers | Stadium: Subaru Park; Attendance: 18,520; Referee: Guido Gonzales Jr. |

| March 18 3 | Chicago Fire | 3–3 | FC Cincinnati | Chicago, Illinois |
| 20:30 | (yellow card) 13' Terán; 32', (yellow card) 90+2' Przybyłko; 45' (pen.) Czichos; 46' Mueller; (yellow card) 58' Giménez; (yellow card) 65' M. Navarro; (yellow card) 90' Pineda | Report | 8', 87' Moreno; (yellow card) 58' Vazquez; 84' Santos | Stadium: Soldier Field; Attendance: 7,815; Referee: Fotis Bazakos |

| March 25 4 | Inter Miami CF | 2–3 | Chicago Fire | Fort Lauderdale, Florida |
| 19:30 | (yellow card) 13' Yedlin; 45+3' Negri; 76' Stefanelli | Report | 30' Mueller; 38', (yellow card) 79' Terán; 90+2' Kei Kamara | Stadium: DRV PNK Stadium; Attendance: 17,699; Referee: Tori Penso |

| April 1 5 | Chicago Fire | 0–0 | DC United | Chicago, Illinois |
| 20:30 | | Report | (yellow card) 28' Fountas; (yellow card) 74' Klich | Stadium: Soldier Field; Attendance: 8,621; Referee: Pierre-Luc Lauziere |

| April 8 6 | Chicago Fire | 2–1 | Minnesota United FC | Chicago, Illinois |
| 20:30 | 24', 36' Kamara; (yellow card) 82' Omsberg | Report | 57' Arriaga | Stadium: Soldier Field; Attendance: 12,218; Referee: Timothy Ford |

| April 15 7 | Chicago Fire | 2–2 | Philadelphia Union | Chicago, Illinois |
| 20:30 | 19' Haile-Selassie; 47' (o.g.) Harriel; (yellow card) 66' Herbers; (yellow card) 90+5' Giménez | Report | 62' (pen.) Gazdag; 65' Carranza | Stadium: Soldier Field; Attendance: 12,811; Referee: Ismail Elfath |

| April 23 8 | Atlanta United FC | 2–1 | Chicago Fire | Atlanta, Georgia |
| 16:30 | 13', (yellow card) 24' Giakoumakis; 90+9' (o.g.) Haile-Selassie | Report | (yellow card) 34' Herbers; (yellow card) 77' Terán; (yellow card) 80' Giménez; 90' Przybyłko; (yellow card) 90+5' Dean | Stadium: Mercedes-Benz Stadium; Attendance: 43,335; Referee: Viktor Rivas |

| April 29 9 | Chicago Fire | 1–1 | New York Red Bulls | Chicago, Illinois |
| 20:30 | (yellow card) 4' Czichos; 34' Kamara; (yellow card) 45+1' Pineda; (yellow card) 47' M. Navarro; (yellow card) 50' Mueller; (yellow card) 82' Dean | Report | (yellow card) 12' Cásseres; (yellow card) 38' Fernandez; 89' Burke | Stadium: Soldier Field; Attendance: 11,432; Referee: Chris Penso |

| May 6 10 | Nashville SC | 3–0 | Chicago Fire | Nashville, Tennessee |
| 20:30 | (yellow card) 29' Lovitz; 45+3' (pen.), 70' (pen.), 90+1' Mukhtar; (yellow card) 56' Bunbury; (yellow card) 77' Moore | Report | (yellow card) 36' Koutsias; (yellow card) 52' Omsberg; (yellow card) 67' Burks; (yellow card) 88' Aceves | Stadium: Geodis Park; Attendance: 28,611; Referee: José Carlos Rivero |

| May 13 11 | Chicago Fire | 1–0 | St. Louis City SC | Chicago, Illinois |
| 12:00 | 40' Czichos; (yellow card) 59' Giménez; (yellow card) 64' Herbers | Report | (yellow card) 26' Perez; (yellow card) 43' (yellow-red card) 70' Nelson; (yellow card) 49' Gioacchini | Stadium: Soldier Field; Attendance: 18,231; Referee: Filip Dujic |

| May 17 12 | Charlotte FC | 2–1 | Chicago Fire | Charlotte, North Carolina |
| 19:30 | Malanda (yellow card) 45+1'; Kahlina (yellow card) 55'; Cambridge 68', 81'; Świderski (yellow card) 80'; Jones (yellow card) 87'; Sobociński (yellow card) 88' | Report | (yellow card) 20' Giménez; 29' Przybyłko; (yellow card) 39' Gutiérrez; (yellow card) 72' Torres; (yellow card) 90+1' Koutsias | Stadium: Bank of America Stadium; Attendance: 29,016; Referee: Tori Penso |

| May 20 13 | Chicago Fire | 3–3 | Atlanta United FC | Chicago, Illinois |
| 20:30 | (yellow card) 3' (yellow-red card) 26' F. Navarro; 42' (o.g.) Purata; (yellow card) 45+2' Herbers; 49' Haile-Selassie; (yellow card) 58' Gutiérrez; 89' Koutsias | Report | 29' Gutman; (yellow card) 41' Ibarra; 55', 65' Giakoumakis; (yellow card) 69' (yellow-red card) 71' Araújo; (yellow card) 90' Diop | Stadium: Soldier Field; Attendance: 18,343; Referee: Rosendo Mendoza |

| May 27 14 | New England Revolution | 3–3 | Chicago Fire | Foxborough, Massachusetts |
| 19:30 | Buck 38'; Wood 40'; Blessing (yellow card) 50'; Altidore 83'; Jones (yellow card) 90+2' | Report | Koutsias 10'; Farrell 22' (o.g.); Torres (yellow card) 47'; Haile-Selassie 79' | Stadium: Gillette Stadium; Attendance: 27,293; Referee: Malik Badawi |

| May 31 15 | Toronto FC | 0–0 | Chicago Fire | Toronto, Ontario |
| 19:30 | Kaye (yellow card) 45+3' | Report | Navarro (yellow card) 33' | Stadium: BMO Field; Attendance: 22,778; Referee: Nima Saghafi |

| June 3 16 | FC Cincinnati | 1–0 | Chicago Fire | Cincinnati, Ohio |
| 19:30 | Miazga (yellow card) 54'; Acosta 83'; Barreal (yellow card) 89' | Report | Souquet (yellow card) 28'; Shaqiri (yellow card) 67'; Haile-Selassie (yellow card) 73' | Stadium: TQL Stadium; Attendance: 25,513; Referee: Chris Penso |

| June 10 17 | Chicago Fire | 1–2 | Columbus Crew | Chicago, Illinois |
| 20:30 | Navarro (yellow card) 45+5'; Shaqiri 88'; Herbers (yellow card) 89' | Report | Amundsen (yellow card) 20'; Zawadzki (yellow card) 29'; Hernández 59'; Farsi (yellow card) 81'; Zelarayán 90+3', (yellow card) 90+5' | Stadium: Soldier Field; Attendance: 18,892; Referee: Mark Allatin |

| June 21 18 | Portland Timbers | 1–2 | Chicago Fire | Portland, Oregon |
| 22:30 | Boli 26'; Asprilla (yellow card) 56'; Bravo (yellow card) 75' | Report | Herbers 8'; Kamara 83' | Stadium: Providence Park; Attendance: 22,548; Referee: Fotis Bazakos |

| June 24 19 | Sporting Kansas City | 0–1 | Chicago Fire | Kansas City, Kansas |
| 20:30 | Shelton (yellow card) 88'; Sallói (yellow card) 90+2' | Report | Czichos (yellow card) 38'; Herbers 47'; Pineda (yellow card) 64'; Souquet (yellow card) 67' | Stadium: Children's Mercy Park; Attendance: 18,032; Referee: Alex Chilowicz |

| July 1 20 | Orlando City SC | 3–1 | Chicago Fire | Orlando, Florida |
| 19:30 | Jansson (yellow card) 35'; Torres 38', 55' (pen.); Enrique 75'; Thórhallsson (yellow card) 90+9' | Report | Souquet (yellow card) 20' (yellow-red card) 84'; Shaqiri 66' (pen.); Navarro (yellow card) 72' | Stadium: Exploria Stadium; Attendance: 22,070; Referee: Nima Saghafi |

| July 8 21 | Chicago Fire | 1–0 | Nashville SC | Chicago, Illinois |
| 20:30 | 34' Herbers; (yellow card) 81' Kamara | Report | (yellow card) 37' Leal; (yellow card) 86' Lovitz | Stadium: Soldier Field; Attendance: 22,348; Referee: Pierre-Luc Lauziere |

| July 12 22 | Chicago Fire | 3–0 | CF Montreal | Chicago, Illinois |
| 20:30 | Gutiérrez 9'; Haile-Selassie 11'; Shaqiri 33'; Czichos (yellow card) 35'; Souquet (yellow card) 56'; Pineda (yellow card) 78' | Report | Offor (yellow card) 70' | Stadium: Soldier Field; Attendance: 12,496; Referee: Malik Badawi |

| July 15 23 | Chicago Fire | 1–0 | Toronto FC | Chicago, Illinois |
| 20:30 | Czichos (yellow card) 76'; Przybylko 90' | Report | Petretta (yellow card) 55' | Stadium: Soldier Field; Attendance: 18,246; Referee: Sergii Boiko |

| August 20 24 | Chicago Fire | 1–3 | Orlando City SC | Chicago, Illinois |
| 20:30 | Pineda 47', (yellow card) 77'; Giménez (yellow card) 59'; Doumbia (yellow card) 71'; Shaqiri (yellow card) 74' | Report | Schlegel (yellow card) 34'; Cartagena 50'; Angulo 54'; Torres (yellow card) 55', (goal) 68' (pen.) | Stadium: Soldier Field; Attendance: 18,103; Referee: Lukasz Szpala |

| August 26 25 | LA Galaxy | 3–0 | Chicago Fire | Carson, California |
| 22:30 | 29' Boyd; 72' Puig; 90' (pen.) Sharp | Report | (yellow card) 2' (yellow-red card) 27' Giménez; (yellow card) 89' Dean | Stadium: Dignity Health Sports Park; Attendance: 19,762; Referee: Ismail Elfath |

| August 30 26 | Chicago Fire | 0–1 | Vancouver Whitecaps FC | Chicago, Illinois |
| 20:30 | | Report | White 19'; Brown (yellow card) 58' | Stadium: Soldier Field; Attendance: 9,187; Referee: Ricardo Fierro |

| September 2 27 | DC United | 4–0 | Chicago Fire | Washington, D.C. |
| 19:30 | 9', 90+1' Benteke; 20' Ku-DiPietro; 40' (o.g.) Terán | Report | (yellow card) 21' F. Navarro | Stadium: Audi Field; Attendance: 16,075; Referee: Sergii Boiko |

| September 16 28 | CF Montreal | 0–0 | Chicago Fire | Montreal, Quebec |
| 19:30 | Choinière (yellow card) 13'; Quioto (yellow card) 86'; Corbo (yellow card) 90+3' | Report | Pineda (yellow card) 20'; Doumbia (yellow card) 76'; Herbers (yellow card) 80' | Stadium: Saputo Stadium; Attendance: 19,619; Referee: Mark Allatin |

| September 20 29 | Columbus Crew | 3–0 | Chicago Fire | Columbus, Ohio |
| 19:30 | Hernández 8' (pen.), 16' (pen.), 23' | Report | Brady (yellow card) 8'; Souquet (yellow card) 13'; Czichos (yellow card) 33'; Shaqiri (yellow card) 44' (yellow-red card) 67'; Koutsias (yellow card) 72'; Przybyłko (yellow card) 74' | Stadium: Lower.com Field; Attendance: 20,349; Referee: Ismir Pekmic |

| September 23 30 | Chicago Fire | 2–2 | New England Revolution | Chicago, Illinois |
| 20:30 | Gutiérrez 18'; Giménez 54', (yellow card) 65'; Doumbia (yellow card) 90+8' | Report | Chancalay 17', (yellow card) 90+10'; C. Gil 59' | Stadium: Soldier Field; Attendance: 20,129; Referee: Timothy Ford |

| September 30 31 | New York Red Bulls | 0–1 | Chicago Fire | Harrison, New Jersey |
| 19:30 | Ndam (yellow card) 49' (yellow-red card) 62'; Tolkin (yellow card) 90+3' | Report | Doumbia (yellow card) 17'; Koutsias (yellow card) 59', (goal) 64'; Brady (yellow card) 82'; Dean (yellow card) 90+5' | Stadium: Red Bull Arena; Attendance: 20,347; Referee: Filip Dujic |

| October 4 32 | Chicago Fire | 4–1 | Inter Miami CF | Chicago, Illinois |
| 20:30 | Shaqiri 49', 73'; Dean (yellow card) 52'; Haile-Selassie 62', 66' | Report | Busquets (yellow card) 42'; Martínez 53' (pen.); Farías (yellow card) 90' | Stadium: Soldier Field; Attendance: 62,124; Referee: Joseph Dickerson |

| October 17 33 | Chicago Fire | 0–2 | Charlotte FC | Chicago, Illinois |
| 20:30 | Giménez (yellow card) 61'; Terán (yellow card) 80' | Report | Westwood 23'; Świderski 58' (pen.); Jones (yellow card) 90+3'; Jóźwiak (yellow card) 90+6' | Stadium: Soldier Field; Attendance: 18,308; Referee: Natalie Simon |

| October 21 34 | New York City FC | 1–0 | Chicago Fire | New York, New York |
| 17:00 | Fernández 64'; Rodríguez (yellow card) 78'; O'Toole (yellow card) 89'; Perea (yellow card) 90+4' | Report | | Stadium: Citi Field; Attendance: 23,260; Referee: Allen Chapman |

=== Leagues Cup ===
==== Central 2 ====
| Pos | Team | Pld | W | PW | PL | L | GF | GA | GD | Pts | Qualification | CHI | MIN | PUE |
|---|---|---|---|---|---|---|---|---|---|---|---|---|---|---|
| 1 | (United States) Chicago Fire FC | 2 | 1 | 0 | 1 | 0 | 4 | 3 | +1 | 4 | Advance to knockout stage | — | — | — |
| 2 | (United States) Minnesota United FC | 2 | 1 | 0 | 0 | 1 | 6 | 3 | +3 | 3 | Advance to knockout stage | 2–3 | — | — |
| 3 | (Mexico) Puebla | 2 | 0 | 1 | 0 | 1 | 1 | 5 | −4 | 2 | | 1–1 | 0–4 | — |

Source: Leagues Cup
Rules for classification: Tiebreakers

| July 27 GS | Minnesota United FC (United States) | 2–3 | (United States) Chicago Fire FC | Saint Paul |
| 20:30 ET | Tapias (yellow card) 45+2'; Arriaga (yellow card) 58'; Hlongwane 62, 73' | Report | Herbers (yellow card) 57'; Shaqiri 69' (pen.); Giménez (yellow card) 72'; Souquet 79'; Kamara 83' | Stadium: Allianz Field; Attendance: 18,419; Referee: Nima Saghafi |

| July 31 GS | Chicago Fire FC (United States) | 1–1 (9–10 p) | (Mexico) Puebla | Bridgeview |
| 20:30 ET | Terán (yellow card) 71'; Shaqiri 79'; Brady (yellow card) 93' | Report | de Buen (yellow card) 52'; Angulo 74'; Baltazar (red card) 77' | Stadium: SeatGeek Stadium; Attendance: 12,619; Referee: Jesús Rafael López Valle |
| | Penalties |
| | (penalty missed) Czichos; (penalty scored) Shaqiri; (penalty scored) Gutiérrez; (penalty scored) Przybyłko; (penalty scored) Pineda; (penalty scored) Aceves; (penalty scored) Torres; (penalty scored) Doumbia; (penalty scored) Terán; (penalty scored) Brady; (penalty missed) Czichos | | Mancuello (penalty scored); Álvarez (penalty missed); Barragán (penalty scored); Ferrareis (penalty scored); Angulo (penalty scored); Silva (penalty scored); Velasco (penalty scored); Olmedo (penalty scored); González (penalty scored); Rodríguez (penalty scored); Mancuello (penalty scored) |

| August 4 R32 | Chicago Fire FC (United States) | 0–1 | (Mexico) América | Bridgeview |
| 20:00 ET | M. Navarro (yellow card) 23'; Souquet (yellow card) 87'; Shaqiri (yellow card) 96'; Pineda (yellow card) 99' | Report | Álvarez (yellow card) 23'; Giménez 64' (o.g.); Sánchez (red card) 94' | Stadium: SeatGeek Stadium; Attendance: 18,417; Referee: Walter López Castellanos |

=== U.S. Open Cup ===
| April 26 Third round | Chicago Fire (MLS) (Illinois) | 3–0 | (Illinois) Chicago House AC (LQ) | Bridgeview, Illinois |
| 7:00 PM CDT | 26' Przybyłko; 37', 70' Burks | Report | (yellow card) 43' AR Smith; (yellow card) 59' Ricardo Avalos | Stadium: SeatGeek Stadium; Attendance: 3,421; Referee: Luis Arroyo |

| May 9 Round of 32 | Chicago Fire FC (MLS) (Illinois) | 2–1 | (Missouri) St. Louis City SC (MLS) | Bridgeview, Illinois |
| 7:00 PM CDT | 3' Haile-Selassie; 75' Herbers | Report | (yellow card) 70' Pompeu; 90+3' Perez | Stadium: SeatGeek Stadium; Attendance: 4,371; Referee: Brandon Stevis |

| May 22 Round of 16 | Austin FC (MLS) (Texas) | 0–2 | (Illinois) Chicago Fire FC (MLS) | Austin, Texas |
| 8:00 PM CDT | Radovanović (yellow card) 62'; Ring (yellow card) 89' | Report | Czichos 27'; Pineda (yellow card) 48'; Przybyłko 77' | Stadium: Q2 Stadium; Attendance: 19,402; Referee: Alex Chilowicz |

| June 6 Quarterfinals | Chicago Fire FC (MLS) (Illinois) | 1–4 | (Texas) Houston Dynamo FC (MLS) | Bridgeview, Illinois |
| 7:30 PM CDT | Pineda (yellow card) 21'; Souquet 40'; Navarro (yellow card) 62'; Giménez (yellow card) 63'; Burks (yellow card) 90' | Report | Bassi 12' (pen.); Ibrahim 31', 59'; Quiñónes 74'; Gasper (yellow card) 89' | Stadium: SeatGeek Stadium; Attendance: 7,512; Referee: Marcos De Oliveira |

== Statistics ==
Note: italics indicates a player who left during the season

=== Games played ===
| No. | Pos. | Nat. | Name | MLS | | | | Leagues Cup | | | | Open Cup | | | | Total | | | |
| No. | Pos. | Nat. | Name | Starts | Apps | Minutes | Bench | Starts | Apps | Minutes | Bench | Starts | Apps | Minutes | Bench | Starts | Apps | Minutes | Bench |
|---|---|---|---|---|---|---|---|---|---|---|---|---|---|---|---|---|---|---|---|
| 2 | DF | FRA | Arnaud Souquet | 22 | 25 | 1834 | 7 | 2 | 3 | 172 | | 3 | 3 | 225 | | 27 | 31 | 2231 | 7 |
| 3 | DF | MEX | Alonso Aceves | 9 | 20 | 850 | 9 | 1 | 1 | 90 | 2 | 1 | 1 | 78 | 3 | 11 | 22 | 929 | 14 |
| 4 | DF | COL | Carlos Terán | 19 | 24 | 1572 | | 3 | 3 | 270 | | | | | | 22 | 27 | 1663 | |
| 5 | DF | GER | Rafael Czichos | 27 | 31 | 2511 | | 1 | 2 | 92 | 1 | 2 | 2 | 180 | 1 | 30 | 35 | 2783 | 2 |
| 6 | DF | VEN | Miguel Navarro | 22 | 25 | 1973 | 5 | 2 | 2 | 180 | 1 | 4 | 4 | 360 | | 28 | 31 | 2513 | 6 |
| 7 | MF | SUI | Maren Haile-Selassie | 20 | 32 | 1911 | 1 | 2 | 3 | 185 | | 4 | 4 | 270 | | 26 | 39 | 2366 | 1 |
| 8 | FW | USA | Chris Mueller | 8 | 10 | 709 | | | | | | | 1 | 44 | | 8 | 11 | 753 | |
| 10 | MF | SWI | Xherdan Shaqiri | 22 | 28 | 2052 | | 2 | 3 | 204 | | 3 | 3 | 240 | | 27 | 34 | 2496 | |
| 11 | FW | POL | Kacper Przybyłko | 11 | 25 | 969 | 6 | 1 | 3 | 119 | | 1 | 3 | 86 | 1 | 13 | 31 | 1174 | 7 |
| 16 | DF | USA | Wyatt Omsberg | 7 | 11 | 704 | 18 | | | | | 2 | 2 | 180 | | 9 | 13 | 884 | 18 |
| 17 | MF | USA | Brian Gutiérrez | 28 | 32 | 2399 | 2 | 2 | 3 | 191 | | 3 | 3 | 244 | | 33 | 38 | 2804 | 2 |
| 18 | GK | USA | Spencer Richey | 4 | 5 | 420 | 25 | 1 | 2 | 110 | 1 | 4 | 4 | 360 | | 9 | 11 | 890 | 26 |
| 19 | FW | GRE | Georgios Koutsias | 13 | 27 | 1012 | 2 | 2 | 3 | 140 | | | 3 | 46 | 1 | 15 | 33 | 1198 | 3 |
| 20 | FW | MEX | Jairo Torres | 8 | 22 | 759 | 2 | 2 | 2 | 172 | | | 2 | 40 | | 10 | 26 | 972 | 2 |
| 21 | MF | GER | Fabian Herbers | 24 | 32 | 1979 | | 2 | 2 | 111 | 1 | | 2 | 53 | 1 | 26 | 36 | 2141 | 2 |
| 22 | DF | USA | Mauricio Pineda | 16 | 25 | 1566 | 3 | 2 | 3 | 196 | | 4 | 4 | 331 | | 22 | 32 | 2093 | 3 |
| 23 | FW | SLE | Kei Kamara | 15 | 27 | 1520 | 3 | | 1 | 24 | | 3 | 3 | 245 | | 18 | 31 | 1789 | 3 |
| 24 | DF | USA | Jonathan Dean | 13 | 22 | 1371 | 4 | 1 | 2 | 98 | 1 | 1 | 1 | 90 | | 15 | 25 | 1549 | 5 |
| 25 | GK | USA | Jeff Gal | | | | 7 | | | | 3 | | | | 4 | | | | 14 |
| 26 | MF | CIV | Ousmane Doumbia | 9 | 11 | 813 | | 2 | 3 | 204 | | | | | | 11 | 14 | 1018 | |
| 27 | DF | USA | Kendall Burks | 5 | 9 | 506 | 15 | | | | 3 | 1 | 3 | 136 | 1 | 6 | 12 | 642 | 19 |
| 30 | MF | PAR | Gastón Giménez | 27 | 31 | 2210 | | 3 | 3 | 237 | | 3 | 4 | 266 | | 33 | 38 | 2733 | |
| 31 | MF | ARG | Federico Navarro | 15 | 16 | 1084 | 1 | | 1 | 15 | 1 | 4 | 4 | 292 | | 19 | 21 | 1411 | 2 |
| 32 | MF | USA | Missael Rodriguez | | 1 | 14 | 15 | | | | 3 | | 1 | 12 | | | 2 | 26 | 18 |
| 33 | FW | USA | Victor Bezerra | | | | 1 | | | | | | | | | | | | 1 |
| 34 | GK | USA | Chris Brady | 30 | 30 | 2640 | | 2 | 2 | 160 | 1 | | | | | 32 | 32 | 2800 | 1 |
| 35 | MF | USA | Sergio Oregel | | | | | | | | | | 1 | 44 | | | 1 | 44 | |
| 36 | DF | USA | Justin Reynolds | | | | 2 | | | | | | | | | | | | 1 |
| 37 | MF | USA | Javier Casas | | 3 | 52 | 10 | | | | | | 1 | 44 | | | 4 | 96 | 10 |
| 38 | FW | USA | Alex Monis | | 1 | 9 | 2 | | | | 3 | | 1 | 90 | | | 2 | 99 | 5 |
| 39 | MF | USA | Allan Rodriguez | | | | | | | | | | | | | | | | |
| 48 | DF | USA | Charlie Ostrem | | | | 2 | | | | | | | | | | | | 2 |

=== Goalkeeping ===
| No. | Nat. | Name | MLS | | | Leagues Cup | | | Open Cup | | | Total | | |
| No. | Nat. | Name | Clean Sheets | Saves | GA | Clean Sheets | Saves | GA | Clean Sheets | Saves | GA | Clean Sheets | Saves | GA |
|---|---|---|---|---|---|---|---|---|---|---|---|---|---|---|
| 18 | USA | Spencer Richey | | 10 | 7 | | 3 | 2 | 2 | 9 | 5 | 2 | 22 | 14 |
| 25 | USA | Jeff Gal | | | | | | | | | | | | |
| 34 | USA | Chris Brady | 8 | 94 | 44 | | 7 | 2 | | | | 8 | 101 | 46 |

=== Goals ===
| Rk. | Player | MLS | League's Cup | Open Cup | Total |
| Rk. | Player | Goal | Goal | Goal | Goal |
|---|---|---|---|---|---|
| 1 | (Switzerland) Maren Haile-Selassie | 6 | 0 | 1 | 7 |
| 1 | (Switzerland) Xherdan Shaqiri | 5 | 2 | 0 | 7 |
| 3 | (Sierra Leone) Kei Kamara | 5 | 1 | 0 | 6 |
| 3 | (Poland) Kacper Przybyłko | 4 | 0 | 2 | 6 |
| 5 | (Germany) Fabian Herbers | 4 | 0 | 1 | 5 |
| 6 | (Germany) Rafael Czichos | 2 | 0 | 1 | 3 |
| 6 | (Greece) Georgios Koutsias | 3 | 0 | 0 | 3 |
| 8 | (United States) Kendall Burks | 0 | 0 | 2 | 2 |
| 8 | (United States) Brian Gutiérrez | 2 | 0 | 0 | 2 |
| 8 | (United States) Chris Mueller | 2 | 0 | 0 | 2 |
| 12 | (Paraguay) Gastón Giménez | 1 | 0 | 0 | 1 |
| 12 | (United States) Mauricio Pineda | 1 | 0 | 0 | 1 |
| 12 | (France) Arnaud Souquet | 0 | 1 | 0 | 1 |
| 12 | (Colombia) Carlos Terán | 1 | 0 | 0 | 1 |

=== Assists ===
| Rk. | Player | MLS | League's Cup | Open Cup | Total |
| Rk. | Player | A | A | A | A |
|---|---|---|---|---|---|
| 1 | (United States) Brian Gutiérrez | 9 | 0 | 2 | 11 |
| 2 | (Switzerland) Xherdan Shaqiri | 5 | 0 | 2 | 7 |
| 2 | (Venezuela) Miguel Navarro | 4 | 1 | 1 | 6 |
| 4 | (Switzerland) Maren Haile-Selassie | 4 | 0 | 0 | 4 |
| 5 | (Germany) Fabian Herbers | 3 | 0 | 0 | 3 |
| 5 | (France) Arnaud Souquet | 3 | 0 | 0 | 3 |
| 7 | (United States) Jonathan Dean | 2 | 0 | 0 | 2 |
| 7 | (Ivory Coast) Ousmane Doumbia | 2 | 0 | 0 | 2 |
| 7 | (Paraguay) Gastón Giménez | 2 | 0 | 0 | 2 |
| 7 | (Sierra Leone) Kei Kamara | 2 | 0 | 0 | 2 |
| 7 | (Greece) Georgios Koutsias | 2 | 0 | 0 | 2 |
| 7 | (United States) Chris Mueller | 2 | 0 | 0 | 2 |
| 7 | (United States) Mauricio Pineda | 0 | 1 | 1 | 2 |
| 7 | (Poland) Kacper Przybyłko | 2 | 0 | 0 | 2 |
| 15 | (Mexico) Alonso Aceves | 0 | 0 | 1 | 1 |
| 15 | (United States) Javier Casas | 1 | 0 | 0 | 1 |
| 15 | (United States) Wyatt Omsberg | 0 | 0 | 1 | 1 |
| 15 | (Mexico) Jairo Torres | 1 | 0 | 0 | 1 |

=== Disciplinary record ===
| Rk. | Player | MLS | | | League's Cup | | | Open Cup | | | Total | | |
| Rk. | Player | Yellow card | Second yellow card | Red card | Yellow card | Second yellow card | Red card | Yellow card | Second yellow card | Red card | Yellow card | Second yellow card | Red card |
|---|---|---|---|---|---|---|---|---|---|---|---|---|---|
| 1 | (Paraguay) Gastón Giménez | 8 | 1 | 0 | 1 | 0 | 0 | 1 | 0 | 0 | 10 | 1 | 0 |
| 2 | (Germany) Fabian Herbers | 6 | 1 | 0 | 1 | 0 | 0 | 0 | 0 | 0 | 7 | 1 | 0 |
| 3 | (France) Arnaud Souquet | 4 | 1 | 0 | 1 | 0 | 0 | 0 | 0 | 0 | 5 | 1 | 0 |
| 4 | (Switzerland) Xherdan Shaqiri | 2 | 1 | 0 | 1 | 0 | 0 | 0 | 0 | 0 | 3 | 1 | 0 |
| 5 | (Argentina) Federico Navarro | 1 | 1 | 0 | 0 | 0 | 0 | 1 | 0 | 0 | 2 | 1 | 0 |
| 6 | (Sierra Leone) Kei Kamara | 1 | 1 | 0 | 0 | 0 | 0 | 0 | 0 | 0 | 1 | 1 | 0 |
| 7 | (United States) Mauricio Pineda | 7 | 0 | 0 | 1 | 0 | 0 | 2 | 0 | 0 | 10 | 0 | 0 |
| 8 | (Venezuela) Miguel Navarro | 6 | 0 | 0 | 1 | 0 | 0 | 0 | 0 | 0 | 7 | 0 | 0 |
| 9 | (Germany) Rafael Czichos | 6 | 0 | 0 | 0 | 0 | 0 | 0 | 0 | 0 | 6 | 0 | 0 |
| 9 | (Colombia) Carlos Terán | 5 | 0 | 0 | 1 | 0 | 0 | 0 | 0 | 0 | 6 | 0 | 0 |
| 11 | (United States) Jonathan Dean | 5 | 0 | 0 | 0 | 0 | 0 | 0 | 0 | 0 | 5 | 0 | 0 |
| 12 | (United States) Chris Brady | 3 | 0 | 0 | 1 | 0 | 0 | 0 | 0 | 0 | 4 | 0 | 0 |
| 12 | (Ivory Coast) Ousmane Doumbia | 4 | 0 | 0 | 0 | 0 | 0 | 0 | 0 | 0 | 4 | 0 | 0 |
| 12 | (Greece) Georgios Koutsias | 4 | 0 | 0 | 0 | 0 | 0 | 0 | 0 | 0 | 4 | 0 | 0 |
| 15 | (United States) Brian Gutiérrez | 2 | 0 | 0 | 0 | 0 | 0 | 0 | 0 | 0 | 2 | 0 | 0 |
| 15 | (United States) Wyatt Omsberg | 2 | 0 | 0 | 0 | 0 | 0 | 0 | 0 | 0 | 2 | 0 | 0 |
| 15 | (Poland) Kacper Przybyłko | 2 | 0 | 0 | 0 | 0 | 0 | 0 | 0 | 0 | 2 | 0 | 0 |
| 15 | (Mexico) Jairo Torres | 2 | 0 | 0 | 0 | 0 | 0 | 0 | 0 | 0 | 2 | 0 | 0 |
| 19 | (Mexico) Alonso Aceves | 1 | 0 | 0 | 0 | 0 | 0 | 0 | 0 | 0 | 1 | 0 | 0 |
| 19 | (United States) Kendall Burks | 1 | 0 | 0 | 0 | 0 | 0 | 1 | 0 | 0 | 1 | 0 | 0 |
| 19 | (United States) Chris Mueller | 1 | 0 | 0 | 0 | 0 | 0 | 0 | 0 | 0 | 1 | 0 | 0 |

== Awards ==
=== Man of the Match awards ===
| Game # | Player | Stats | Reference |
|---|---|---|---|
| 1 | (Germany) Fabian Herbers | 1 goal | |
| 2 | None awarded | | |
| 3 | (United States) Chris Mueller | 1 goal | |
| 4 | (Colombia) Carlos Terán (1) | 1 goal | |
| 5 | (Germany) Rafael Czichos | 3 tackles, 16 duels won | |
| 6 | (Sierra Leone) Kei Kamara | 2 goals | |
| 7 | (Switzerland) Maren Haile-Selassie (1) | 1 goal | |
| 8 | None awarded | | |
| 9 | None awarded | | |
| 10 | None awarded | | |
| 11 | (Switzerland) Xherdan Shaqiri (1) | 1 assist | |
| 12 | None awarded | | |
| 13 | (Switzerland) Maren Haile-Selassie (2) | 1 goal, 1 assist | |
| 14 | (Switzerland) Xherdan Shaqiri (2) | 1 assist | |
| 15 | None awarded | | |
| 16 | None awarded | | |
| 17 | None awarded | | |
| 18 | (Paraguay) Gastón Giménez (1) | 1 assist | |
| 19 | (United States) Chris Brady (1) | 4 saves, clean sheet | |
| 20 | (United States) Chris Brady (2) | 6 saves | |
| 21 | (United States) Chris Brady (3) | 2 saves, clean sheet | |
| 22 | (United States) Mauricio Pineda | 1 tackle, 1 block, 5 recoveries | |
| 23 | (Switzerland) Maren Haile-Selassie (3) | 2 key passes, 87.5% passing accuracy | |
| 24 | None awarded | | |
| 25 | None awarded | | |
| 26 | None awarded | | |
| 27 | None awarded | | |
| 28 | (United States) Chris Brady (4) | 4 saves | |
| 29 | None awarded | | |
| 30 | (United States) Brian Gutiérrez | 1 goal, 1 assist | |
| 31 | (Colombia) Carlos Terán (2) | 1 tackle, 6 duels won | |
| 32 | (Paraguay) Gastón Giménez (2) | 1 assist | |
| 33 | None awarded | | |
| 34 | (Argentina) Federico Navarro | 1 tackle, 7 duels | |

=== MLS Team of the Matchday ===
| Matchday | Player | Position | Report |
|---|---|---|---|
| 2 | (Germany) Fabian Herbers (1) | MF | |
| 5 | (Colombia) Carlos Terán | DF | |
| 5 | (United States) Brian Gutiérrez (1) | Bench | |
| 7 | (Sierra Leone) Kei Kamara | FW | |
| 12 | (Switzerland) Xherdan Shaqiri (1) | MF | |
| 12 | (Germany) Rafael Czichos | Bench | |
| 12 | (United States) Brian Gutiérrez (2) | Bench | |
| 14 | (Switzerland) Maren Haile-Selassie (1) | Bench | |
| 15 | (Switzerland) Xherdan Shaqiri (2) | Bench | |
| 20 | (United States) Brian Gutiérrez (3) | MF | |
| 21 | (Germany) Fabian Herbers (2) | MF | |
| 24 | (United States) Mauricio Pineda | DF | |
| 24 | (Germany) Fabian Herbers (3) | Bench | |
| 25 | (Switzerland) Xherdan Shaqiri (3) | MF | |
| 25 | (Switzerland) Maren Haile-Selassie (2) | Bench | |
| 26 | (Venezuela) Miguel Navarro | Bench | |
| 32 | (United States) Chris Brady | GK | |
| 34 | (United States) Brian Gutiérrez (4) | Bench | |
| 36 | (Switzerland) Xherdan Shaqiri (4) | MF | |
| 36 | (Paraguay) Gastón Giménez | Bench | |
| 36 | (Switzerland) Maren Haile-Selassie (3) | Bench | |
| 36 | (United States) Frank Klopas | Coach | |

=== MLS All-Star Game ===
| Player | All-Star Statistics | Report |
|---|---|---|
| (Sierra Leone) Kei Kamara | 21 minutes played | |

== Second team statistics ==
Note: Stats are for regular and post season combined

=== Games played ===
| No. | Pos. | Nat. | Name | MLS Next Pro | | |
| No. | Pos. | Nat. | Name | Starts | Apps | Minutes |
|---|---|---|---|---|---|---|
| 3 | DF | MEX | Alonso Aceves | 5 | 5 | 285 |
| 16 | DF | USA | Wyatt Omsberg | 7 | 7 | 584 |
| 18 | GK | USA | Spencer Richey | 2 | 2 | 180 |
| 24 | DF | USA | Jonathan Dean | 2 | 2 | 135 |
| 25 | GK | USA | Jeff Gal | 13 | 13 | 1125 |
| 27 | DF | USA | Kendall Burks | 13 | 14 | 1001 |
| 32 | MF | USA | Missael Rodriguez | 10 | 20 | 1040 |
| 33 | FW | USA | Victor Bezerra | 7 | 10 | 456 |
| 35 | MF | USA | Sergio Oregel | 17 | 24 | 1389 |
| 36 | DF | USA | Justin Reynolds | 24 | 26 | 2006 |
| 37 | MF | USA | Javier Casas | 10 | 11 | 597 |
| 38 | FW | USA | Alex Monis | 13 | 19 | 1056 |
| 39 | MF | USA | Allan Rodriguez | 3 | 6 | 265 |

=== Goalkeeping ===
| No. | Nat. | Name | MLS Next Pro | | |
| No. | Nat. | Name | Clean Sheets | Saves | GA |
|---|---|---|---|---|---|
| 18 | USA | Spencer Richey | 1 | 3 | 2 |
| 25 | USA | Jeff Gal | 3 | 42 | 13 |

=== Goals and assists ===
| Rank | Player | Goal | A |
|---|---|---|---|
| 1 | (United States) Alex Monis | 6 | 2 |
| 2 | (United States) Sergio Oregel | 3 | 2 |
| 3 | (United States) Victor Bezerra | 3 | 1 |
| 4 | (United States) Missael Rodriguez | 2 | 1 |
| 5 | (United States) Justin Reynolds | 1 | 3 |
| 6 | (United States) Jonathan Dean | | 1 |
| 6 | (United States) Wyatt Omsberg | | 1 |

=== Cards ===
| Rank | Player | Booked | (yellow card) (yellow-red card) | Sent off (straight red) |
|---|---|---|---|---|
| 1 | (United States) Javier Casas | 1 | 1 | |
| 2 | (United States) Sergio Oregel | 3 | | |
| 3 | (United States) Justin Reynolds | 2 | | |
| 3 | (United States) Allan Rodriguez | 2 | | |
| 3 | (United States) Missael Rodriguez | 2 | | |
| 6 | (United States) Victor Bezerra | 1 | | |
| 6 | (United States) Jeff Gal | 1 | | |
| 6 | (United States) Alex Monis | 1 | | |
