= 2021 Chicago Fire FC season =

Chicago Fire FC
2021 season
- Chairman: Joe Mansueto
- Head coach: Raphaël Wicky (until September 30); Frank Klopas (interim since September 30)
- Stadium: Soldier Field (capacity: 61,500)
- MLS: Conference: 12th Overall: 22nd
- U.S. Open Cup: Canceled
- Top goalscorer: League: Robert Berić (8 goals, 3 assists); All: Robert Berić (8 goals, 3 assists)
- Highest home attendance: 31,308 (10/23 v. RSL)
- Lowest home attendance: 5,593 (9/29 v. NYC)
- Average home league attendance: 10,703
- Biggest win: CHI 3–0 ATL (7/3)
- Biggest defeat: NSH 5–1 CHI (7/17)
Home colors	Away colors

The 2021 Chicago Fire FC season was the club's 23rd year of existence, as well as their 24th in Major League Soccer. This was the Fire's first season with fans in Soldier Field since 2005 (the Fire had officially moved in 2020; however, fans were not allowed in Soldier Field due to the pandemic). The Fire would fail to qualify for the playoffs for the fourth season in a row. Head coach Raphael Wicky was ultimately relieved of his position on September 30, with Assistant Coach Frank Klopas taking over on an interim basis.

== Current squad ==
As of November 1, 2021

No.	Name	Nationality	Position	Date of birth (age)	Previous club	Player Notes
1	Bobby Shuttleworth	(United States)	G	May 17, 1987 (aged 34)	(United States) Sacramento Republic	
2	Boris Sekulić	(Slovakia)	D	October 21, 1991 (aged 30)	(Poland) Górnik Zabrze	International
3	Jonathan Bornstein	(United States)	D	November 7, 1984 (aged 37)	(Israel) Maccabi Netanya F.C.	
4	Johan Kappelhof	(Netherlands)	D	August 5, 1990 (aged 31)	(Netherlands) FC Groningen	
5	Francisco Calvo	(Costa Rica)	D	July 8, 1992 (aged 29)	(United States) Minnesota United FC	
6	Miguel Navarro	(Venezuela)	D	February 26, 1999 (aged 22)	(Venezuela) Deportivo La Guaira F.C.	
7	Ignacio Aliseda	(Argentina)	M	March 14, 2000 (aged 21)	(Argentina) Defensa y Justicia	International; Young Designated Player
8	Luka Stojanović	(Serbia)	M	January 4, 1994 (aged 27)	(Serbia) FK Čukarički	
9	Chinonso Offor	(Nigeria)	F	May 7, 2000 (aged 21)	(Latvia) FK RFS	International
10	Álvaro Medrán	(Spain)	M	March 15, 1994 (aged 27)	(Spain) Valencia CF	
14	Jhon Espinoza	(Ecuador)	D	February 24, 1999 (aged 22)	(Ecuador) S.D. Aucas	International
18	Kenneth Kronholm	(United States)	G	October 14, 1985 (aged 36)	(Germany) Holstein Kiel	
20	Wyatt Omsberg	(United States)	D	September 21, 1995 (aged 26)	(United States) Minnesota United FC	
21	Fabian Herbers	(Germany)	F	August 17, 1993 (aged 28)	(United States) Philadelphia Union	
22	Mauricio Pineda	(United States)	D	October 17, 1997 (aged 24)	(United States) North Carolina Tar Heels	Homegrown
23	Carlos Terán	(Colombia)	D	September 24, 2000 (aged 21)	(Colombia) Envigado F.C.	International
25	Nicholas Slonina	(United States)	D	March 20, 2001 (aged 20)	(United States) Chicago Fire Academy	Homegrown
27	Robert Berić	(Slovenia)	F	June 17, 1991 (aged 30)	(France) AS Saint-Étienne	Designated Player
28	Elliot Collier	(New Zealand)	F	February 22, 1995 (aged 26)	(United States) Loyola Chicago	
30	Gastón Giménez	(Paraguay)	M	July 27, 1991 (aged 30)	(Argentina) Vélez Sarsfield	International; Designated Player
31	Federico Navarro	(Argentina)	M	March 9, 2000 (aged 21)	(Argentina) Talleres de Cordoba	International; U-22 Initiative
32	Gabriel Slonina	(United States)	G	May 15, 2004 (aged 17)	(United States) Chicago Fire Academy	Homegrown
34	Chris Brady	(United States)	G	March 3, 2004 (aged 17)	(United States) Chicago Fire Academy	Homegrown
36	Andre Reynolds II	(United States)	D	May 2, 2001 (aged 20)	(United States) Chicago Fire Academy	Homegrown; On Loan
37	Javier Casas	(United States)	M	May 14, 2003 (aged 18)	(United States) Chicago Fire Academy	Homegrown
38	Alex Monis	(United States)	F	March 20, 2003 (aged 18)	(United States) Chicago Fire Academy	Homegrown
39	Allan Rodríguez	(United States)	M	May 7, 2004 (aged 17)	(United States) Chicago Fire Academy	Homegrown
40	Brian Gutiérrez	(United States)	M	June 17, 2003 (aged 18)	(United States) Chicago Fire Academy	Homegrown
99	Stanislav Ivanov	(Bulgaria)	M	April 16, 1999 (aged 22)	(Bulgaria) PFC Levski Sofia	

== Player movement ==
=== In ===
Date	Player	Position	Previous club	Notes	Ref
November 12, 2020	(New Zealand) Elliot Collier	F	(United States) Chicago Fire FC	Option was exercised	
November 12, 2020	(United States) Djordje Mihailovic	M	(United States) Chicago Fire FC	Option was exercised	
November 12, 2020	(United States) Wyatt Omsberg	D	(United States) Chicago Fire FC	Option was exercised	
November 12, 2020	(United States) Nicholas Slonina	D	(United States) Chicago Fire FC	Option was exercised	
November 13, 2020	(Nigeria) Chinonso Offor	F	(Latvia) FK RFS	Signed on a contract through 2023 with an option for 2024	
November 23, 2020	(Ecuador) Jhon Espinoza	D	(Ecuador) S.D. Aucas	Signed on a contract through 2023 with options for 2024 and 2025	
December 9, 2020	(Bulgaria) Stanislav Ivanov	M	(Bulgaria) PFC Levski Sofia	Signed on a contract through 2023 with an option for 2024	
August 6, 2021	(Argentina) Federico Navarro	M	(Argentina) Talleres de Cordoba	Signed as a U-22 Initiative player on a contract through 2025 with an option for 2026	

=== Out ===
Date	Player	Position	Destination Club	Notes	Ref
November 12, 2020	(Uganda) Micheal Azira	M	(United States) New Mexico United	Option was declined	
November 12, 2020	(United States) Jeremiah Gutjahr	D/M	(United States) Indy Eleven	Option was declined	
November 12, 2020	(United States) C. J. Sapong	M/F	(United States) Nashville SC	Option was declined	
November 12, 2020	(United States) Connor Sparrow	G	(United States) Miami FC	Option was declined	
November 30, 2020	(United States) Brandt Bronico	M	(United States) Charlotte FC	Option was declined; his rights were ultimately traded to Charlotte FC alongside the Fire's 2022 fourth-round draft pick in exchange for Charlotte's fourth-round draft pick	
December 17, 2020	(United States) Djordje Mihailovic	M	(Canada) Montreal Impact	Traded to Montreal in exchange for $800,000 in GAM in 2021 and 2022, possibly up to $1 million, along with a percentage of any future trade	
August 5, 2021	(Poland) Przemysław Frankowski	M	(France) RC Lens	Sold to RC Lens for an undisclosed fee	

=== Loaned out ===
Date	Player	Position	Destination Club	Notes	Ref
May 14, 2021	(United States) Andre Reynolds	D	(United States) Memphis 901 FC	Loaned to Memphis for the duration of the season	

=== Unsigned draft picks and trialists ===
Pick	Player	Position	Previous club	Notes	Ref
R2, P33	(United States) Jackson Ragen	D	(United States) University of Michigan	Ultimately signed with Tacoma Defiance	
R2, P47	(United States) Christian Pinzon	F	(United States) California State University, Fullerton	Pinzon signed with C.D. Guadalajara	
R3, P60	(United States) Mitch Guitar	M	(United States) University of Wisconsin	Officially a member of Indy Eleven, traded to Memphis 901 FC	
Trialist	(United States) Michael Vang	M	(United States) Forward Madison FC	Invited to trial with the Fire for the preseason, due to the partnership with Madison	

== Technical staff ==
Position	Staff
Sporting director	(Switzerland) Georg Heitz
Technical director	(Germany) Sebastian Pelzer
Head coach	(Switzerland) Raphaël Wicky (Until September 30)
Assistant coach/interim head coach	(United States) Frank Klopas (until September 30, interim head coach afterwards)
Assistant coach	(Australia) David Zdrilic (Until May 20)
Interim assistant coach	(France) Ludovic Taillandier (Since September 30)
Goalkeeping coach	(United States) Adin Brown

Last updated: October 30, 2021
Source: Chicago Fire Technical Staff

== Match results ==
=== Preseason ===
March 13, 2021 Preseason 1	Chicago Fire FC	2–1	New York City FC	Citrus Ridge, Florida
12:00 p.m. EST	Berić 14'; Collier 54'	Report	Calvo 1' (o.g.)	Stadium: ChampionsGate Sports Complex

March 20, 2021 Preseason 2	Philadelphia Union	0–1	Chicago Fire FC	Clearwater, Florida
3:00 p.m. EDT	Martínez (yellow card) 8'; Fontana (yellow card) 31'; Wagner (yellow card) 61'	CHI Report; PHI Report	Kappelhof (yellow card) 37'; Gutiérrez (yellow card) 40'; Casas 100' (Frankowski)	Stadium: Joe DiMaggio Sports Complex
Note: Additional 25-minute period after the full 90 minutes

March 27, 2021 Preseason 3	Chicago Fire FC	1–2	FC Cincinnati	Citrus Ridge, Florida
11:30 a.m. EDT	Sekulić 15'	Report	Acosta 35'; Harris 78'	Stadium: ChampionsGate Sports Complex

April 3, 2021 Preseason 4	Orlando City SC	2–2	Chicago Fire FC	Orlando, Florida
11:30 a.m. EDT	Michel 25'; Mueller 64'	Report	Frankowski 3'; Stojanović 55' (Frankowski)	Stadium: Exploria Stadium

April 7, 2021 Preseason 5	Chicago Fire FC	2–0	Forward Madison FC	Bridgeview, Illinois
12:00 p.m. CDT	Medrán 3'; Gutiérrez 68'	Report	Toyama (yellow card) 75'	Stadium: SeatGeek Stadium

April 10, 2021 Preseason 6	Chicago Fire FC	2–3	Vancouver Whitecaps FC	Bridgeview, Illinois
11:30 a.m. CDT	Berić 9' (pen.); Calvo	CHI Report; VAN Report	Dájome 5'; Cavallini 30' (Owusu), 60'	Stadium: SeatGeek Stadium

=== Regular season ===
April 17 1	Chicago Fire FC	2–2	New England Revolution	Chicago, Illinois
7:30 p.m. CDT	Berić 5'; Stojanović 11'; Kappelhof (yellow card) 79'	Report	Buksa 14'; Bou 27'; Jones (red card) 90+2'	Stadium: Soldier Field; Attendance: 8,102; Referee: Fotis Bazakos

April 24 2	Atlanta United FC	3–1	Chicago Fire FC	Atlanta, Georgia
7:00 p.m. CDT	Barco 23', (yellow card) 70'; Mulraney (yellow card) 27'; Kappelhof 66' (o.g.); Hyndman (yellow card) 81', (goal) 85'	Report	Stojanović 46'; Giménez (yellow card) 90'	Stadium: Mercedes-Benz Stadium; Attendance: 20,335; Referee: Allen Chapman

May 1 3	NY Red Bulls	2–0	Chicago Fire FC	Harrison, New Jersey
12:00 p.m. CDT	Davis (yellow card) 42'; Cásseres 47'; Clarr 64'	Report	Sekulić (yellow card) 44'; Calvo (yellow card) 62'	Stadium: Red Bull Arena; Attendance: unknown Referee: Ted Unkel

May 8 4	Chicago Fire FC	0–2	Philadelphia Union	Chicago, Illinois
12:00 p.m. CDT	Kappelhof (yellow card) 26'; Omsberg (yellow card) 48'; Sekulić (yellow card) 90+2'	Report	Burke 51'; Glesnes 60'; Santos (yellow card) 90+2'; Bedoya (yellow card) 90+6'; Glesnes (yellow card) 90+7'	Stadium: Soldier Field; Attendance: 6,457; Referee: Marcos DeOliviera

May 13 5	D.C. United	1–0	Chicago Fire FC	Washington, D.C.
7:00 p.m. CDT	Hines-Ike (yellow card) 4'; Flores 7'; Gressel (yellow card) 47'	Report	Omsberg (yellow card) 19'; Frankowski (yellow card) 52'; Herbers (yellow card) 63'	Stadium: Audi Field; Attendance: 3,935; Referee: Ramy Rouchan

May 22 6	Chicago Fire FC	1–0	Inter Miami CF	Chicago, Illinois
5:00 p.m. CDT	Medrán (yellow card) 9'; Stojanović 69'; Offor (yellow card) 89'; Sekulić (yellow card) 90+1'	Report	Pírez (yellow card) 22'; Ulloa (yellow card) 31'; Robinson (yellow card) 61'; Shawcross (yellow card) 67'; Matuidi (yellow card) 68'; Figal (yellow card) 85'	Stadium: Soldier Field; Attendance: 10,844; Referee: Silviu Petrescu

May 29 7	Chicago Fire FC	0–1	CF Montreal	Chicago, Illinois
12:00 p.m. CDT		Report	Camacho (yellow card) 17'; Wanyama (yellow card) 62'; Toye 87'	Stadium: Soldier Field; Attendance: 6,680; Referee: Victor Rivas

June 19 8	Columbus Crew	2–0	Chicago Fire FC	Columbus, Ohio
6:30 p.m. CDT	Zardes 17', 34'; Etienne (yellow card) 21'; Williams (yellow card) 25'	Report	Herbers (yellow card) 44'; Medrán (yellow card) 65'	Stadium: Historic Crew Stadium; Attendance: 20,064; Referee: Alex Chilowicz

June 23 9	Chicago Fire FC	0–1	FC Cincinnati	Chicago, Illinois
7:00 p.m. CDT		Report	Barreal 50' (yellow card) 79'; Vazquez (yellow card) 84'	Stadium: Soldier Field; Attendance: 5,926; Referee: Ismir Pekmic

June 26 10	Chicago Fire FC	3–3	Philadelphia Union	Chicago, Illinois
7:00 p.m. CDT	Glesnes 2' (o.g.); Stojanović (yellow card) 44'; Sekulić 56'; Navarro (yellow card) 62'; Pineda 67'; Herbers (yellow card) 81'	Report	Elliott (yellow card) 10'; Sullivan 28'; Santos (yellow card) 34'; Burke 45+2'; Wagner (yellow card) 52'; Powell (yellow card) 55'; Sekulić 79' (o.g.)	Stadium: Soldier Field; Attendance: 7,308; Referee: Fotis Bazakos

July 3 11	Chicago Fire FC	3–0	Atlanta United FC	Chicago, Illinois
7:00 p.m. CDT	Bornstein (yellow card) 26'; Frankowski (yellow card) 31' (goal) 58'; Aliseda 34', 45+6'	Report	Bello (yellow card) 27'; Wolff (yellow card) 52'; Walkes (yellow card) 69'	Stadium: Soldier Field; Attendance: 14,898; Referee: Baldomero Toledo

July 7 12	Chicago Fire FC	3–1	Orlando City SC	Chicago, Illinois
7:00 p.m. CDT	Bornstein (yellow card) 12'; Medrán (yellow card) 22'; Sekulić 45+1'; Berić 72'; Herbers (yellow card) 84'; Offor 90+6'	Report	Perea 34'; Jansson (yellow card) 79'	Stadium: Soldier Field; Attendance: 8,002; Referee: Guido Gonzales Jr.

July 17 13	Nashville SC	5–1	Chicago Fire FC	Nashville, Tennessee
7:30 p.m. CDT	Mukhtar 10', 13', 16'; Sapong 39'; Anuga 62'	Report	Kappelhof (red card) 14'; Pineda (yellow card) 27'; Aliseda 47'; Navarro (yellow card) 49'	Stadium: Nissan Stadium; Attendance: 23,113; Referee: Lukasz Szpala
Note: Hany Mukhtar's Hat-trick for Nashville SC was the fastest hat-trick in MLS history

July 21 14	Chicago Fire FC	2–2	D.C. United	Chicago, Illinois
7:00 p.m. CDT	Giménez 32', (yellow card) 62'; Najar 61' (o.g.); Medrán (yellow card) 65'	Report	Najar (yellow card) 55'; Paredes 82'; Skundrich (yellow card) 84'; Kamara 87' (pen.)	Stadium: Soldier Field; Attendance: 8,306; Referee: Marcos de Oliveira

July 24 15	Chicago Fire FC	1–2	Toronto FC	Chicago, Illinois
7:00 p.m. CDT	Pineda (yellow card) 70'; Medrán 77'	Report	Soteldo 2'; DeLeon 76'; Singh (yellow card) 81'	Stadium: Soldier Field; Attendance: 12,288; Referee: Victor Rivas

August 1 16	Philadelphia Union	1–1	Chicago Fire FC	Philadelphia, Pennsylvania
5:00 p.m. CDT	Glesnes (yellow card) 30'; Wagner 36'; Elliott (yellow card) 65'	Report	Frankowski 10'; Omsberg (red card) 34'; Herbers (yellow card) 41'; Berić (yellow card) 78'	Stadium: Subaru Park; Attendance: 16,677; Referee: Michael Radchuk

August 4 17	Chicago Fire FC	0–0	New York City FC	Chicago, Illinois
7:00 p.m. CDT	Kappelhof (yellow card) 90'	Report	Parks (yellow card) 42' (yellow-red card) 73'; Tajouri-Shradi (yellow card) 84'	Stadium: Soldier Field; Attendance: 8,371; Referee: Baldomero Toledo

August 8 18	Chicago Fire FC	2–1	New York Red Bulls	Chicago, Illinois
5:00 p.m. CDT	Stojanović 2', 8'; Offor (yellow card) 90+5'	Report	Edwards (yellow card) 21'; Davis (yellow card) 39'; Tarek (yellow card) 69'; Gutman (yellow card) 77'; Barlow 90+7'	Stadium: Soldier Field; Attendance: 11,894; Referee: Guido Gonzales Jr.

August 15 19	Chicago Fire FC	1–0	Columbus Crew	Chicago, Illinois
5:00 p.m. CDT	Stojanović 77'	Report	Etienne (yellow card) 27'	Stadium: Soldier Field; Attendance: 13,005; Referee: Nima Saghafi

August 18 20	Inter Miami CF	3–2	Chicago Fire FC	Fort Lauderdale, Florida
6:30 p.m. CDT	Vassilev 34'; González Pírez (yellow card) 50'; Robinson 62' (yellow card) 74'; Carranza (yellow card) 84'; Pizarro 90+3'	Report	Calvo 40'; Stojanović 48'; Herbers (yellow card) 60'	Stadium: DRV PNK Stadium; Attendance: 13,196; Referee: Baldomero Toledo

August 21 21	Orlando City SC	1–0	Chicago Fire FC	Orlando, Florida
6:30 p.m. CDT	Michel 51'; Mueller (yellow card) 78'	Report	Terán (yellow card) 72'	Stadium: Exploria Stadium; Referee: Tim Ford

August 28 22	New York Red Bulls	0–1	Chicago Fire FC	Harrison, New Jersey
6:00 p.m. CDT	Reyes (yellow card) 73'; Duncan (yellow card) 78'	Report	Berić 32'; Terán (yellow card) 81'	Stadium: Red Bull Arena; Attendance: 12,018; Referee: Victor Rivas

September 11 23	Sporting Kansas City	2–0	Chicago Fire FC	Kansas City, Kansas
7:30 p.m. CDT	José Mauri 4'; Russel 6'	Report	Stojanović (yellow card) 32'; F. Navarro (yellow card) 53'; M. Navarro (yellow card) 68'	Stadium: Children's Mercy Park; Attendance: 18,467; Referee: Jon Freemon

September 15 24	D.C. United	3–0	Chicago Fire FC	Washington, D.C.
7:00 p.m. CDT	Kamara 9' (pen.), 35' (pen.), 44'; Pines (yellow card) 12'; Gressel (yellow card) 53'	Report	Terán (yellow card) 7'; Giménez (yellow card) 11'	Stadium: Audi Field; Attendance: 13,524; Referee: David Gantar

September 19 25	CF Montréal	2–0	Chicago Fire FC	Montreal, Quebec
12:00 p.m. CDT	Quioto 60'; Terán 80' (o.g.)	Report	Stojanović (yellow card) 39'; Terán (yellow card) 49'	Stadium: Saputo Stadium; Referee: Marcos de Oliveira

September 22 26	Chicago Fire FC	2–3	New England Revolution	Chicago, Illinois
7:00 p.m. CDT	Terán (yellow card) 17', (goal) 40'; Medrán (yellow card) 34'; Giménez 63'	Report	Kessler 11'; Caldwell (yellow card) 31'; Bunbury 62'; Gil 90+1', (yellow card) 90+1'	Stadium: Soldier Field; Attendance: 7,052; Referee: Lukasz Szpala

September 26 27	Chicago Fire FC	0–0	Nashville SC	Chicago, Illinois
7:00 p.m. CDT	Pineda (yellow card) 50'	Report	Anunga (yellow card) 56'	Stadium: Soldier Field; Attendance: 15,915; Referee: Timothy Ford

September 29 28	Chicago Fire FC	2–0	New York City FC	Bridgeview, Illinois
7:00 p.m. CDT	Navarro (yellow card) 16'; Berić 48'; Giménez (yellow card) 59'; Navarro 66'	Report	Medina (yellow card) 10'; Acevedo (yellow card) 27'	Stadium: SeatGeek Stadium; Attendance: 5,593; Referee: Baldomero Toledo

October 3 29	Toronto FC	3–1	Chicago Fire FC	Toronto, Ontario
3:00 p.m. CDT	Soteldo (yellow card) 9', (penalty missed) 36', 70'; Delgado 44'; Gonzalez 56'; Laryea (yellow card) 89'	Report	Berić 16'; Offor (yellow card) 86'	Stadium: BMO Field; Referee: Nima Saghafi

October 16 30	New England Revolution	2–2	Chicago Fire FC	Foxborough, Massachusetts
6:00 p.m. CDT	Kaptoum 47'; Bou 76'; Buchanan (yellow card) 90+3'	Report	Medrán 49'; F. Navarro (yellow card) 60'; Aliseda 88'; M. Navarro (yellow card) 90+3'	Stadium: Gillette Stadium; Attendance: 28,414; Referee: Joseph Dickerson

October 20 31	FC Cincinnati	3–4	Chicago Fire FC	Cincinnati, Ohio
6:30 p.m. CDT	Acosta 28'; Bailey (yellow card) 30'; Vázquez 36'; Gyau (yellow card) 48'; Cameron (yellow card) 80'; Blackett 90+1'	Report	Berić 14', 17'; Kappelhof (yellow card) 45+1'; Medrán 71'; F. Navarro (yellow card) 68'; G. Slonina (yellow card) 79'; Stojanović 90+3'	Stadium: TQL Stadium; Attendance: 21,369; Referee: Jon Freemon

October 23 32	Chicago Fire FC	1–0	Real Salt Lake	Chicago, Illinois
7:00 p.m. Central Time Zone	Herbers (yellow card) 29'; Berić 45'; Pineda (yellow card) 67'; Giménez (yellow card) 74'; Gutiérrez (yellow card) 86'	Report		Stadium: Soldier Field; Attendance: 31,308; Referee: Rosendo Mendoza

October 27 33	New York City FC	1–0	Chicago Fire FC	New York, New York
6:30 p.m. CDT	Castellanos 51' (pen.), (yellow card) 90+1'	Report	Pineda (yellow card) 32'	Stadium: Yankee Stadium; Referee: Fotis Bazakos

November 7 34	Columbus Crew	2–0	Chicago Fire FC	Columbus, Ohio
2:30 p.m. CST	Zelarayán 31'; Berry 58'	Report	Navarro (yellow card) 59'; Offor (yellow card) 62'; Espinoza (yellow card) 88'; Ivanov (yellow card) 89'	Stadium: Mapfre Stadium; Attendance: 19,351; Referee: Timothy Ford

== Squad statistics ==
Note: Italics indicate the player left the squad or was loaned out and has not returned from loan.

=== Games played ===
No.	Pos.	Nat.	Name	MLS		
No.	Pos.	Nat.	Name	Starts	Apps	Minutes
1	GK	USA	Bobby Shuttleworth	23	23	2070
2	DF	SVK	Boris Sekulić	27	28	2312
3	DF	USA	Jonathan Bornstein	25	30	2220
4	DF	NED	Johan Kappelhof	16	19	1230
5	DF	CRC	Francisco Calvo	16	17	1455
6	DF	VEN	Miguel Navarro	25	28	2226
7	MF	ARG	Ignacio Aliseda	16	23	1592
8	MF	SER	Luka Stojanović	15	27	1347
9	FW	NGR	Chinonso Offor	11	34	1326
10	MF	ESP	Alvaro Medran	26	32	2288
11	MF	POL	Przemyslaw Frankowski	12	13	1064
14	DF	ECU	Jhon Espinoza	8	20	807
18	GK	USA	Kenneth Kronholm			
20	DF	USA	Wyatt Omsberg	9	18	754
21	MF	GER	Fabian Herbers	22	27	1833
22	DF	USA	Mauricio Pineda	28	29	2409
23	DF	COL	Carlos Terán	11	13	978
25	DF	USA	Nicholas Slonina			
27	FW	SLO	Robert Berić	26	33	2204
28	FW	NZL	Elliot Collier	3	17	327
30	MF	PAR	Gaston Giménez	22	25	1958
31	MF	ARG	Federico Navarro	10	12	968
32	GK	USA	Gabriel Slonina	11	11	990
34	GK	USA	Chris Brady			
36	DF	USA	Andre Reynolds			
37	MF	USA	Javier Casas		2	55
38	FW	USA	Alex Monis		1	18
39	MF	USA	Allan Rodríguez			
40	MF	USA	Brian Gutierrez	6	17	595
99	FW	BUL	Stanislav Ivanov	6	11	520

=== Goalkeeping statistics ===
No.	Nat.	Name	MLS		
No.	Nat.	Name	Clean sheets	Saves	GA
1	(United States)	Bobby Shuttleworth	4	73	38
18	(United States)	Kenneth Kronholm			
32	(United States)	Gabriel Slonina	4	46	16
34	(United States)	Chris Brady			

=== Goalscoring and assisting record ===
MLS Regular Season
Rank	Player	Goal	A
1	(Slovenia) Robert Berić	8	3
2	(Serbia) Luka Stojanović	8	2
3	(Argentina) Ignacio Aliseda	4	1
4	(Spain) Alvaro Medran	3	6
5	(Slovakia) Boris Sekulic	2	4
6	(Poland) Przemyslaw Frankowski	2	3
7	(Paraguay) Gaston Giménez	2	1
8	(Nigeria) Chinonso Offor	1	2
9	(Costa Rica) Francisco Calvo	1	1
9	(United States) Mauricio Pineda	1	1
11	(Argentina) Federico Navarro	1	
11	(Colombia) Carlos Terán	1	
13	(Germany) Fabian Herbers		4
14	(Venezuela) Miguel Navarro		2
15	(Ecuador) Jhon Espinoza		1
15	(United States) Brian Gutierrez		1
15	(Bulgaria) Stanislav Ivanov		1
