= Georgios Koutsias =

Greek footballer (born 2004)

Personal information
- Date of birth: 8 February 2004 (age 22)
- Place of birth: Thessaloniki, Greece
- Height: 1.80 m (5 ft 11 in)
- Position: Forward

Team information
- Current team: Famalicão
- Number: 70

Youth career
- 2010–2012: Tilemachos Alexandria
- 2012–2021: PAOK

Senior career*
Years	Team	Apps	(Gls)
2020–2023	PAOK	3	(0)
2021–2022	PAOK B	16	(10)
2022–2023	→ Volos (loan)	20	(3)
2023–2025	Chicago Fire	57	(5)
2025	→ Lugano (loan)	20	(6)
2025–2026	Lugano	26	(4)
2026–	Famalicão	11	(5)

International career^{‡}
2019–2020	Greece U17	6	(6)
2022	Greece U18	3	(2)
2021–2023	Greece U19	9	(4)
2020–	Greece U21	25	(10)
- * Club domestic league appearances and goals as of 17 November 2026 ‡ National team caps and goals as of 30 May 2026

Georgios Κoutsias (Greek: Γεώργιος Κούτσιας; born 8 February 2004) is a Greek professional footballer who plays as a striker for Liga Portugal club Famalicão.

== Career ==
=== PAOK ===
In 2012, Koutsias moved to PAOK from Tilemachos Alexandria.

On 18 September 2020, Koutsias made his professional debut in a 1–1 home draw against Atromitos. Less than three months later on 10 December 2020, he made his Europa League debut in a 0–0 away draw against Granada becoming the 16th youngest player in Europa League's history at the time and the second youngest Greek (after Charalampos Mavrias).

=== Chicago Fire ===
On 28 February 2023, Koutsias signed with Major League Soccer side Chicago Fire for an undisclosed fee. Koutsias went on to make his debut with the Chicago Fire on 8 April 2023, coming on as a substitute against Minnesota United.

=== Lugano ===
On 13 December 2024, Chicago Fire announced that they would be loaning Koutsias to Swiss club Lugano on a year-long deal with an option for a permanent transfer, effective 1 January 2025. On 13 December 2025, Lugano made the transfer permanent and signed a two-and-a-half-year contract with Koutsias.

== Personal life ==
Koutsias is from Trikala, Imathia. His father, Nikos, is a former amateur footballer.

== Career statistics ==
As of match played 30 October 2026

Appearances and goals by club, season and competition
Club	Season	League			National cup (Note: Includes Greek Football Cup, U.S. Open Cup)		Continental		Total	
Club	Season	Division	Apps	Goals	Apps	Goals	Apps	Goals	Apps	Goals
PAOK	2020–21	Super League Greece	2	0	3	0	1 (Note: Appearance in UEFA Europa League)	0	6	0
PAOK	2021–22	Super League Greece	1	0	0	0	3 (Note: Appearances in UEFA Europa Conference League)	0	4	0
PAOK	2022–23	Super League Greece	0	0	0	0	2	0	2	0
PAOK	Total		3	0	3	0	6	0	12	0
PAOK B	2021–22	Super League Greece 2	16	9	—		—		16	9
Volos (loan)	2022–23	Super League Greece	20	3	3	2	—		23	5
Chicago Fire	2023	MLS	27	3	3	0	3 (Note: Appearances in Leagues Cup)	0	33	3
Chicago Fire	2024	MLS	30	2	0	0	2	2	32	4
Chicago Fire	Total		57	5	3	0	5	2	65	7
FC Lugano (loan)	2024–25	Swiss Super League	20	6	1	0	2	2	23	8
FC Lugano (loan)	2025–26	Swiss Super League	26	4	1	0	4	0	31	4
F.C. Famalicão	2026–27	Primeira Liga	9	5	2 (Note: One appearance in Taça de Portugal)	2 (Note: Two goals in Taça da Liga)	—		11	7
Career total			151	32	16	4	17	4	184	40

== Honours ==
PAOK

- Greek Cup: 2020–21
