= Gastón Giménez (footballer, born 1991) =

Paraguayan footballer

Personal information
- Full name: Gastón Claudio Giménez
- Date of birth: 27 July 1991 (age 35)
- Place of birth: Formosa, Argentina
- Height: 1.88 m (6 ft 2 in)
- Position: Midfielder

Team information
- Current team: Cerro Porteño
- Number: 30

Youth career
- Almirante Brown

Senior career*
Years	Team	Apps	(Gls)
2011–2014	Almirante Brown	88	(4)
2014	Atlético Tucumán	15	(1)
2015–2018	Godoy Cruz	56	(2)
2018	Estudiantes	9	(0)
2018–2020	Vélez Sarsfield	43	(1)
2020–2024	Chicago Fire	125	(4)
2025–	Cerro Porteño	19	(0)

International career^{‡}
2018	Argentina	1	(0)
2020–2021	Paraguay	9	(1)
- * Club domestic league appearances and goals as of 12 August 2025 ‡ National team caps and goals as of 16:28, 27 January 2022 (UTC)

Gastón Claudio Giménez (born 27 July 1991) is a professional footballer who plays as a midfielder for Paraguayan Primera División club Cerro Porteño.

== Club career ==
Giménez's career started in 2011 with Almirante Brown. His debut arrived at the beginning of the 2011–12 Primera B Nacional season, when he played the final fifteen minutes in a goalless draw away to Rosario Central on 1 October 2011. In February 2012, Giménez scored the first goal of his career in a 2–0 win over Defensa y Justicia. After one goal in nineteen games in his first season, Giménez went onto make another sixty-nine appearances and score three more goals for the club across the next two seasons. In June 2014, Giménez signed for fellow Primera B Nacional team Atlético Tucumán. One goal in fifteen matches followed.

On 2 February 2015, Giménez joined Argentine Primera División side Godoy Cruz. Months later, on 30 May 2015, he was sent off in just his second start for the club versus Unión Santa Fe; the second time in his career that he had received a red card in a match against Unión Santa Fe, the first occurred in March 2014 whilst with Almirante Brown. Giménez remained with Godoy Cruz for a total of four seasons, prior to departing in January 2018 to join Estudiantes of the Primera División. Vélez Sarsfield purchased Giménez in the following July.

On 24 February 2020, Giménez signed with Major League Soccer side Chicago Fire on a two-year deal. He made eighteen appearances in his first season there.

== International career ==
Giménez was born in Argentina and is of Paraguayan descent. In November 2018, Giménez was called up to the Argentina national team by Lionel Scaloni for friendlies with Mexico. He made his international debut in the first friendly with Mexico on 16 November, being substituted on for Giovani Lo Celso with two minutes remaining. He was selected on Scaloni's preliminary squad for the 2019 Copa América. On 20 July 2020, Giménez confirmed claims by Paraguay national team coach Eduardo Berizzo and announced that he had finalized naturalization proceedings, making him eligible to play for Paraguay. On 28 September 2020, he was called up for the 2022 FIFA World Cup qualification matches against Peru and Venezuela by Paraguay national team coach Eduardo Berizzo. He made his competitive debut with Paraguay on 8 October as a starter of the match against Peru, making him cap-tied to Paraguay. He scored on his second cap away to Venezuela.

== Career statistics ==
=== Club ===
As of 26 October 2024

Appearances and goals by club, season and competition
Club	Season	League			National Cup		League Cup		Continental		Other		Total	
Club	Season	Division	Apps	Goals	Apps	Goals	Apps	Goals	Apps	Goals	Apps	Goals	Apps	Goals
Almirante Brown	2011–12	Primera B Nacional	19	1	0	0	—		—		0	0	19	1
Almirante Brown	2012–13	Primera B Nacional	32	0	1	0	—		—		0	0	33	0
Almirante Brown	2013–14	Primera B Nacional	37	3	1	0	—		—		0	0	38	3
Almirante Brown	Total		88	4	2	0	—		—		0	0	90	4
Atlético Tucumán	2014	Primera B Nacional	15	1	0	0	—		—		0	0	15	1
Godoy Cruz	2015	Primera División	17	0	0	0	—		—		0	0	17	0
Godoy Cruz	2016	Primera División	6	0	0	0	—		—		0	0	6	0
Godoy Cruz	2016–17	Primera División	22	2	2	0	—		5 (Note: Appearance(s) in the Copa Libertadores)	1	0	0	29	3
Godoy Cruz	2017–18	Primera División	11	0	3	1	—		2	0	0	0	16	1
Godoy Cruz	Total		56	2	5	1	—		7	1	0	0	68	4
Estudiantes	2017–18	Primera División	9	0	0	0	—		4	0	0	0	13	0
Vélez Sarsfield	2018–19	Primera División	24	0	0	0	4	1	—		0	0	28	1
Vélez Sarsfield	2019–20	Primera División	19	0	0	0	0	0	2 (Note: Appearance(s) in the Copa Sudamericana)	0	0	0	21	0
Vélez Sarsfield	Total		43	0	0	0	4	1	2	0	0	0	62	1
Chicago Fire	2020	Major League Soccer	18	0	0	0	—		—		0	0	18	0
Chicago Fire	2021	Major League Soccer	25	2	0	0	—		—		0	0	25	2
Chicago Fire	2022	Major League Soccer	22	0	0	0	—		—		0	0	22	0
Chicago Fire	2023	Major League Soccer	31	1	4	0	—		—		0	0	35	1
Chicago Fire	2024	Major League Soccer	29	1	0	0	—		—		0	0	29	1
Chicago Fire	Total		125	4	4	0	0	0	0	0	0	0	129	4
Career total			277	8	11	1	4	1	13	1	0	0	364	14

=== International ===
As of 27 January 2022.

Appearances and goals by national team and year
National team	Year	Apps	Goals
Argentina	2018	1	0
Paraguay	2020	4	1
Paraguay	2021	5	0
Total		9	1

As of 13 October 2020
Scores and results list Paraguay's goal tally first, score column indicates score after each Giménez goal.

List of international goals scored by Gastón Giménez
No.	Cap	Date	Venue	Opponent	Score	Result	Competition	Ref.
1	2	13 October 2020	Estadio Metropolitano, Mérida, Venezuela	Venezuela	1–0	1–0	2022 FIFA World Cup qualification	

== See also ==
- List of association footballers who have been capped for two senior national teams
