= Javier Casas (soccer, born 2003) =

American soccer player (born 2003)

Javier Casas Jr.
Personal information
- Full name: Javier Casas Jr.
- Date of birth: May 14, 2003 (age 23)
- Place of birth: Melrose Park, Illinois, United States
- Height: 5 ft 9 in (1.75 m)
- Position: Midfielder

Youth career
- 2015–2020: Chicago Fire

Senior career*
Years	Team	Apps	(Gls)
2020–2024	Chicago Fire	11	(0)
2021	→ Forward Madison (loan)	1	(0)
2022–2024	Chicago Fire II	34	(3)

International career^{‡}
2018	United States U16	9	(0)
2023–	United States U23	5	(0)
- * Club domestic league appearances and goals as of October 26, 2024 ‡ National team caps and goals as of November 16, 2019

Javier Casas Jr. (born May 14, 2003) is an American professional soccer player who plays as a midfielder.

== Club career ==
=== Chicago Fire ===
Born in Melrose Park, Illinois, Casas joined the youth academy at Major League Soccer club Chicago Fire in 2015. On March 10, 2020, Casas signed a professional contract with the Chicago Fire, making him a homegrown player. He made his first appearance in the match day squad on July 14, 2020, against the Seattle Sounders FC, included on the bench but without coming on as a substitute.

Casas made his professional debut for the Chicago Fire on May 15, 2021, appearing as a second-half substitute in a 1–0 defeat against D.C. United.

==== Forward Madison (loan) ====
On July 21, 2021, it was announced that Casas had joined USL League One club Forward Madison on loan, starting in the side's friendly match against Mexican club Atlético Morelia. He then appeared in his first league match for the club on July 24 in their 1–1 draw against Fort Lauderdale CF.

== International career ==
Casas has represented the United States at the under-16 level, making his first appearance on May 15, 2019, against the Czech Republic. He also holds the option to be called up by Mexico.

== Personal life ==
Born in the United States, Casas is of Mexican descent.

== Career statistics ==
As of match played October 1, 2022

Appearances and goals by club, season and competition
Club	Season	League			National cup		Continental		Other		Total	
Club	Season	Division	Apps	Goals	Apps	Goals	Apps	Goals	Apps	Goals	Apps	Goals
Chicago Fire	2020	MLS	0	0	—		—		—		0	0
Chicago Fire	2021	MLS	2	0	—		—		—		2	0
Chicago Fire	2022	MLS	5	0	1	0	—		—		6	0
Chicago Fire	2023	MLS	3	0	1	0	—		—		4	0
Chicago Fire	Total		10	0	1	0	0	0	0	0	12	0
Forward Madison (loan)	2021	USL League One	1	0	—		—		—		1	0
Chicago Fire FC II	2022	MLS Next Pro	8	1	—		—		—		8	1
Chicago Fire FC II	2023	MLS Next Pro	11	0	—		—		—		11	0
Chicago Fire FC II	2024	MLS Next Pro	1	0	—		—		—		1	0
Chicago Fire FC II	Total		20	1	—		—		0	0	20	1
Career total			31	1	2	0	0	0	0	0	33	1
