= Luka Stojanović =

Serbian footballer

Personal information
- Date of birth: 4 January 1994 (age 32)
- Place of birth: Belgrade, FR Yugoslavia
- Height: 1.86 m (6 ft 1 in)
- Position: Midfielder

Team information
- Current team: Karmiotissa
- Number: 10

Youth career
- Partizan
- 2012–2013: Sporting CP

Senior career*
Years	Team	Apps	(Gls)
2012–2014	Sporting CP B	22	(1)
2014–2017	Apollon Limassol	46	(13)
2016–2017	→ Mouscron (loan)	23	(4)
2017	→ Royal Antwerp (loan)	1	(0)
2018–2020	Čukarički	64	(20)
2020–2021	Chicago Fire	29	(8)
2022–2023	Al-Hazem	9	(1)
2023–2024	Čukarički	19	(6)
2024–	Karmiotissa	13	(1)

International career^{‡}
2011	Serbia U17	3	(0)
- * Club domestic league appearances and goals as of 25 June 2025 ‡ National team caps and goals as of 9 July 2012

Luka Stojanović (Serbian Cyrillic: Лука Стојановић; born 4 January 1994) is a Serbian professional footballer who plays as a midfielder for Cypriot club Karmiotissa.

== Club career ==
On 6 October 2012, Stojanović made his debut with Sporting B in a 2012–13 Segunda Liga 2–0 win against Porto B, coming on as a substitute for João Mário. On 1 September 2014, he moved to Apollon Limassol, after two seasons in Portugal. In his first season with Apollon Limassol, Stojanović scored four goals in 19 games for the 2014–15 campaign. On 27 October 2014, Stojanović scored in his debut for match against Ethnikos Achnas. In 2015–16 UEFA Europa League qualifications campaign he made his debut for Apollon Limassol in continental matches, against Saxan. In second leg match, he made his first score in UEFA competitions. At the beginning of 2018, Stojanović signed with the Serbian SuperLiga side Čukarički. On 20 February 2020, Stojanović signed with the Chicago Fire. Following the 2021 season, Stojanović's contract option was declined by Chicago. On 25 January 2022, Stojanović joined Saudi Arabian club Al-Hazem.

On 9 February 2023, Stojanović joined FK Čukarički.

== Career statistics ==
As of match played 1 March 2021

Appearances and goals by club, season and competition
Club	Season	League			National Cup		Continental		Other		Total	
Club	Season	Division	Apps	Goals	Apps	Goals	Apps	Goals	Apps	Goals	Apps	Goals
Sporting CP B	2012–13	Segunda Liga	3	0	—		—		—		3	0
Sporting CP B	2013–14	Segunda Liga	19	1	—		—		—		19	1
Sporting CP B	Total		22	1	0	0	0	0	0	0	22	1
Apollon Limassol	2014–15	Cypriot First Division	18	4	2	0	—		—		20	4
Apollon Limassol	2015–16	Cypriot First Division	28	9	5	0	4 (Note: Appearance(s) in UEFA Europa League)	2	—		37	11
Apollon Limassol	Total		46	13	7	0	4	2	0	0	57	15
Mouscron (loan)	2016–17	Belgian First Division A	23	4	1	0	—		6 (Note: Appearance(s) in Europa League play-offs)	0	30	4
Royal Antwerp (loan)	2017–18	Belgian First Division A	1	0	0	0	—		—		1	0
Čukarički	2017–18	Serbian SuperLiga	11	0	3	0	—		—		14	0
Čukarički	2018–19	Serbian SuperLiga	34	11	—		—		—		34	11
Čukarički	2019–20	Serbian SuperLiga	19	9	2	1	4	2	—		25	12
Čukarički	Total		64	20	5	1	4	2	0	0	73	23
Chicago Fire	2020	Major League Soccer	2	0	—		—		—		2	0
Chicago Fire	2021	Major League Soccer	27	8	—		—		—		27	8
Career total			185	46	13	1	8	4	6	0	212	51

== Honours ==
Individual

- Serbian SuperLiga Player of the Week: 2022–23 (Round 37)
