= Miguel Navarro (footballer) =

Venezuelan footballer (born 1999)

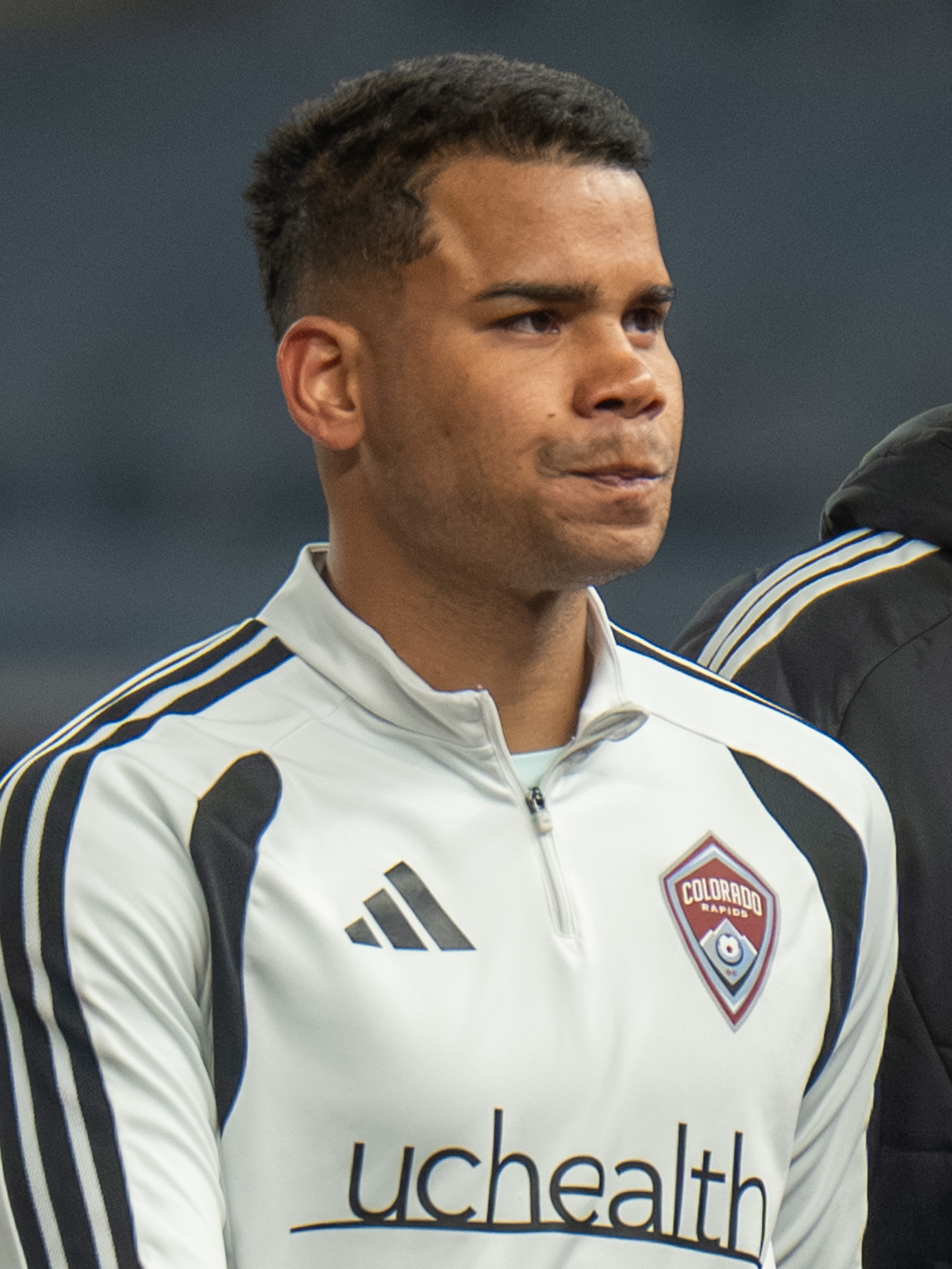
- Navarro with the Colorado Rapids in 2026

Personal information
- Full name: Miguel Ángel Navarro Zárate
- Date of birth: 26 February 1999 (age 27)
- Place of birth: Maracaibo, Venezuela
- Height: 1.75 m (5 ft 9 in)
- Position: Defender

Team information
- Current team: Colorado Rapids (on loan from Club Atlético Talleres)
- Number: 29

Youth career
- –2017: JBL Zulia

Senior career*
| Years | Team | Apps | (Gls) |
| –2017 | JBL Zulia | 19 | (0) |
| 2018–2019 | Deportivo La Guaira | 42 | (1) |
| 2020–2023 | Chicago Fire | 97 | (0) |
| 2023–2024 | Colorado Rapids | 0 | (0) |
| 2024 | → Talleres (loan) | 30 | (1) |
| 2025– | Talleres | 25 | (0) |
| 2026– | → Colorado Rapids (loan) | 2 | (0) |

International career^{‡}
| 2019 | Venezuela U20 | 7 | (0) |
| 2020 | Venezuela U23 | 4 | (0) |
| 2022– | Venezuela | 23 | (0) |
- * Club domestic league appearances and goals as of 18:43, 17 March 2026 (UTC) ‡ National team caps and goals as of 23:20, 9 September 2025 (UTC)

Miguel Ángel Navarro Zárate (born 26 February 1999) is a Venezuelan professional footballer who plays as a defender for Major League Soccer club Colorado Rapids, on loan from Argentine Primera División club Talleres, and the Venezuela national team.

== Club career ==
Born in Maracaibo, Navarro made his professional debut for Primera División club JBL Zulia on 16 April 2017 against Aragua, starting during a 1–0 defeat. Following one season with JBL Zulia, Navarro joined fellow Primera División side Deportivo La Guaira. He made his debut for the club on 30 March 2018 against Monagas.

=== Chicago Fire ===
On 27 January 2020, Navarro moved to the United States and joined Major League Soccer side Chicago Fire. He made his debut for the club on 7 March 2020 against the New England Revolution, coming on as an 81st-minute substitute in a 1–1 draw.

=== Talleres ===
Navarro spent the 2024 season with Talleres, on loan from the Colorado Rapids. On 18 December 2024, it was announced that Talleres had exercised a purchase option and Navarro would be joining the team on a permanent basis.

== International career ==
Navarro first represented his country Venezuela at the under-20s during the 2019 South American U-20 Championship, playing seven matches. He then represented his country at the under-23 level during the 2020 CONMEBOL Pre-Olympic Tournament.

== Career statistics ==
=== Club ===
As of 30 August 2025

| Club | Season | League | | | Cup | | Continental | | Other | | Total | |
| Club | Season | Division | Apps | Goals | Apps | Goals | Apps | Goals | Apps | Goals | Apps | Goals |
|---|---|---|---|---|---|---|---|---|---|---|---|---|
| JBL Zulia | 2017 | Venezuelan Primera División | 19 | 0 | 0 | 0 | – | | – | | 19 | 0 |
| Deportivo La Guaira | 2018 | Venezuelan Primera División | 13 | 0 | 1 (Note: Appearances in the Copa Venezuela) | 0 | – | | – | | 14 | 0 |
| Deportivo La Guaira | 2019 | Venezuelan Primera División | 29 | 1 | 2 | 0 | 1 (Note: Appearances in the Copa Libertadores) | 0 | – | | 32 | 1 |
| Deportivo La Guaira | Total | | 42 | 1 | 3 | 0 | 1 | 0 | – | | 46 | 1 |
| Chicago Fire | 2020 | Major League Soccer | 19 | 0 | – | | – | | – | | 19 | 0 |
| Chicago Fire | 2021 | Major League Soccer | 28 | 0 | 0 | 0 | – | | – | | 28 | 0 |
| Chicago Fire | 2022 | Major League Soccer | 25 | 0 | 1 | 0 | – | | – | | 26 | 0 |
| Chicago Fire | 2023 | Major League Soccer | 25 | 0 | 4 | 0 | – | | 2 (Note: Appearances in Leagues Cup) | 0 | 31 | 0 |
| Chicago Fire | Total | | 97 | 0 | 5 | 0 | – | | 2 | 0 | 104 | 0 |
| Talleres (loan) | 2024 | Argentine Primera División | 30 | 1 | 2 | 0 | 5 (Note: Appearances in Copa Libertadores) | 0 | – | | 37 | 1 |
| Talleres | 2025 | Argentine Primera División | 18 | 0 | 0 | 0 | 5 | 0 | – | | 23 | 0 |
| Career total | | | 206 | 2 | 10 | 0 | 11 | 0 | 2 | 0 | 229 | 2 |

=== International ===
As of match played 9 September 2025

| National team | Year | Apps | Goals |
|---|---|---|---|
| Venezuela | 2022 | 3 | 0 |
| Venezuela | 2023 | 6 | 0 |
| Venezuela | 2024 | 10 | 0 |
| Venezuela | 2025 | 4 | 0 |
| Total | | 23 | 0 |
