= Mauricio Pineda (soccer, born 1997) =

American soccer player (born 1997)

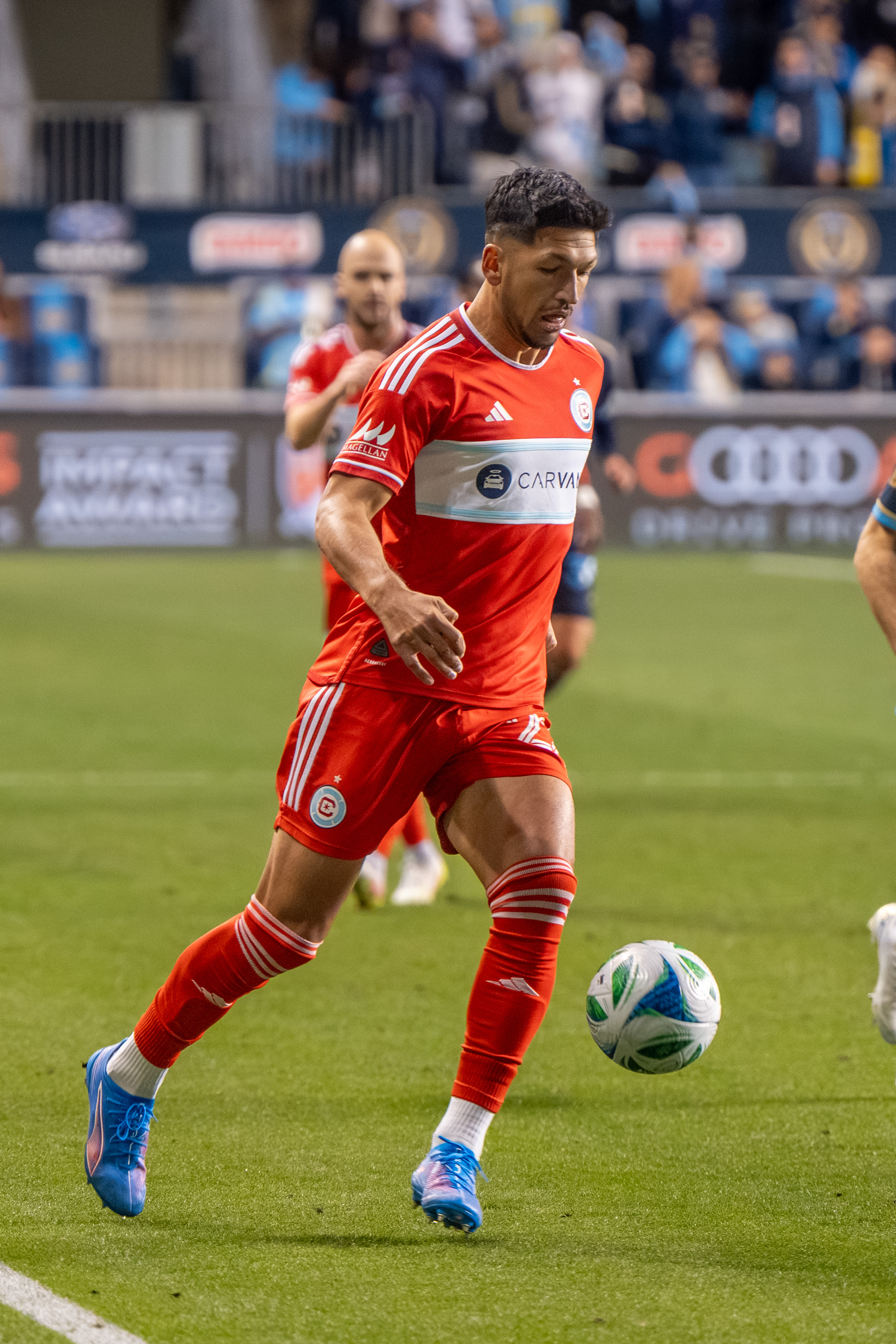
- Pineda with the Chicago Fire in 2025

Personal information
- Date of birth: October 17, 1997 (age 29)
- Place of birth: Bolingbrook, Illinois, U.S.
- Height: 6 ft 1 in (1.85 m)
- Positions: Center-back; defensive midfielder

Team information
- Current team: Chicago Fire
- Number: 22

Youth career
- 2015–2016: Chicago Fire

College career
Years	Team	Apps	(Gls)
2016–2019	North Carolina Tar Heels	79	(17)

Senior career*
Years	Team	Apps	(Gls)
2020–	Chicago Fire	173	(7)

International career
2021	United States U23	2	(0)
- * Club domestic league appearances and goals as of 23:14, 17 November 2026 (UTC)

Mauricio Pineda (born October 17, 1997) is an American professional soccer player who plays as a defensive midfielder for Major League Soccer club Chicago Fire.

== Club career ==
=== College and youth ===
Pineda was part of the Chicago Fire academy, before attending the University of North Carolina at Chapel Hill, where he played college soccer from 2016 to 2019, making 79 appearances, scoring 17 goals and tallying 8 assists.

While at college, Pineda also appeared for USL League Two sides Tobacco Road FC and North Carolina FC U23.

=== Chicago Fire ===
On January 17, 2020, Pineda signed a one-year contract with Chicago Fire as a Homegrown Player, with options for a further three seasons. Pineda made his professional debut on March 1, 2020, starting in a 2–1 loss to Seattle Sounders FC at CenturyLink Field.

On July 14, 2020, Pineda earned his first assist and scored his first professional goal for the Fire, also against Seattle in the MLS is Back Tournament. The Fire won 2–1 with Pineda's goal the game-winner. The following day he signed a contract for the club until 2021.

== International career ==
In December 2020 after his first professional season in MLS, Pineda was called up to the United States national team, the first call up he'd received at any age level. Pineda was named to the final 20-player United States under-23 roster for the 2020 CONCACAF Men's Olympic Qualifying Championship in March 2021.

== Personal life ==
Born in the United States, Pineda is of Mexican descent. He is the younger brother of former soccer player Victor Pineda, who also played for Chicago Fire.

== Career statistics ==
=== Club ===
As of match played October 26, 2024

Club	Season	League			National cup		Continental		Other		Total	
Club	Season	Division	Apps	Goals	Apps	Goals	Apps	Goals	Apps	Goals	Apps	Goals
Chicago Fire	2020	MLS	23	3	—		—		—		23	3
Chicago Fire	2021	MLS	29	1	—		—		—		29	1
Chicago Fire	2022	MLS	27	1	—		—		—		27	1
Chicago Fire	2023	MLS	24	1	4	0	—		3 (Note: Appearances in Leagues Cup)	0	31	1
Chicago Fire	2024	MLS	21	1	—		—		1	0	22	1
Chicago Fire	2025	MLS	0	0	—		—		—		0	0
Chicago Fire	Total		124	7	4	0	0	0	4	0	132	7
Career total			124	7	4	0	0	0	4	0	132	7
