= Souquet =

Souquet may refer to:

- Arnaud Souquet (born 1992), a French football player
- Ralf Souquet (born 1968), a German professional pool player
