= Chinonso Offor =

Nigerian association football player

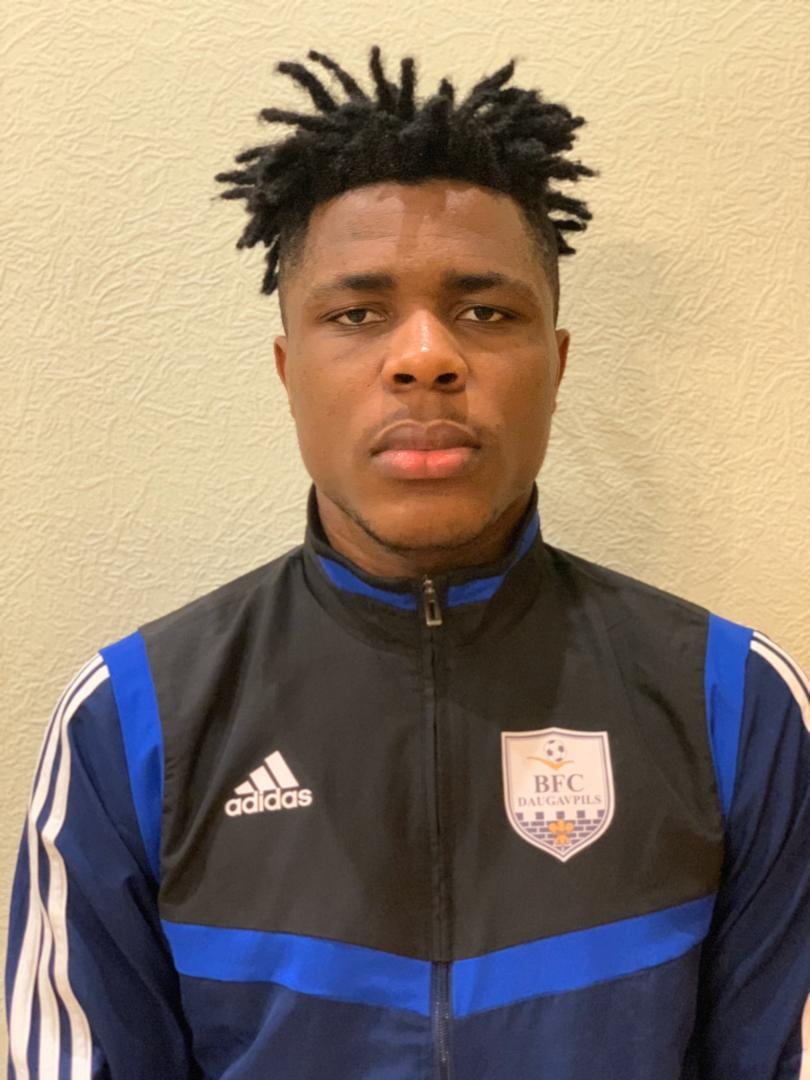

Personal information
- Full name: Chinonso Nnamdi Offor
- Date of birth: 27 May 2000 (age 26)
- Place of birth: Jos, Nigeria
- Height: 6 ft 3 in (1.91 m)
- Position: Striker

Team information
- Current team: Baltika Kaliningrad
- Number: 9

Youth career
- 2012–2016: Real Sapphire

Senior career*
| Years | Team | Apps | (Gls) |
| 2017–2018 | Binatlı Yılmaz | | |
| 2017–2018 | → Cihangir GSK (loan) | | |
| 2019–2020 | Daugavpils | 22 | (10) |
| 2020 | RFS | 13 | (6) |
| 2021–2022 | Chicago Fire | 41 | (2) |
| 2022 | Chicago Fire II | 3 | (2) |
| 2022–2024 | CF Montréal | 30 | (4) |
| 2022–2023 | → Zulte Waregem (loan) | 13 | (1) |
| 2024 | → Arda Kardzhali (loan) | 11 | (2) |
| 2024–2025 | Arda Kardzhali | 34 | (9) |
| 2025– | Baltika Kaliningrad | 34 | (5) |
- * Club domestic league appearances and goals as of 24 October 2026

Chinonso Nnamdi Offor (born 27 May 2000) is a Nigerian professional footballer who plays as a striker for Russian Premier League club Baltika Kaliningrad.

== Club career ==
Offor was born on 27 May 2000 in Jos, Nigeria but grew up in Ekwulobia in Anambra after having fled Jos due to riots. In 2012, he began playing for Real Sapphire in Lagos. In 2017, Offor moved to Northern Cyprus and joined Binatlı Yılmaz, a club that was not affiliated with FIFA or UEFA.

In 2019, Offor received an offer to join Latvian club Daugavpils and signed with them for the 2019 season. On 21 August 2019, Offor made his competitive debut for Daugavpils in the Latvian Cup against Jelgava, starting in the 2–1 defeat. He then scored his first goal in his Virslīga debut against Jelgava, scoring the opener in the 2nd minute of a 2–2 draw. Offor ended his first season in Latvia with 6 goals in 14 matches. The next season, Offor scored his first goal of the season on 25 June 2020 in a 6–0 victory over Tukums 2000. Offor then scored his first professional brace on 29 June in a 4–2 victory over Metta.

In July 2020, Offor moved to RFS, also in the Latvian league. He made his debut and scored his first goal for the club on 21 July in a 3–0 victory over Tukums 2000. He ended his second season in Latvia with 21 matches and 10 goals scored.

On 13 November 2020, Offor joined Major League Soccer club Chicago Fire. He made his debut for the Fire on 17 April 2021 against the New England Revolution, starting in the 2–2 draw. He then scored his first goal for the Fire on 7 July in a 3–1 victory against Orlando City.

On 5 February 2024, Offor moved on loan to Bulgarian side Arda Kardzhali for the rest of 2024. At the end of the season, the club activated their purchased option for a permanent transfer.

On 24 June 2025, Offor signed a four-year contract with Russian club Baltika Kaliningrad.

== Career statistics ==
As of match played 29 October 2026

Appearances and goals by club, season and competition
| Club | Season | League | | | National Cup | | Continental | | Other | | Total | |
| Club | Season | Division | Apps | Goals | Apps | Goals | Apps | Goals | Apps | Goals | Apps | Goals |
|---|---|---|---|---|---|---|---|---|---|---|---|---|
| Daugavpils | 2019 | Virslīga | 14 | 6 | 1 | 0 | — | | — | | 15 | 6 |
| Daugavpils | 2020 | Virslīga | 8 | 4 | 0 | 0 | — | | — | | 8 | 4 |
| Daugavpils | Total | | 22 | 10 | 0 | 0 | 1 | 0 | 0 | 0 | 23 | 10 |
| RFS | 2020 | Virslīga | 13 | 6 | 3 | 0 | 1 (Note: Appearance in UEFA Europa League) | 0 | — | | 17 | 6 |
| Chicago Fire | 2021 | Major League Soccer | 34 | 1 | — | | — | | — | | 34 | 1 |
| Chicago Fire | 2022 | Major League Soccer | 7 | 1 | 1 | 0 | — | | — | | 8 | 1 |
| Chicago Fire | Total | | 41 | 2 | 1 | 0 | 0 | 0 | 0 | 0 | 42 | 2 |
| Chicago Fire II | 2022 | MLS Next Pro | 3 | 2 | — | | — | | — | | 3 | 2 |
| Zulte Waregem (loan) | 2022–23 | Belgian Pro League | 13 | 1 | 3 | 0 | — | | — | | 16 | 1 |
| CF Montréal | 2023 | Major League Soccer | 30 | 4 | — | | — | | 6 (Note: Four appearances, one goal in Canadian Championship, two appearances in Leagues Cup) | 1 | 36 | 5 |
| Arda Kardzhali (loan) | 2023–24 | First Professional Football League | 11 | 2 | 0 | 0 | — | | — | | 11 | 2 |
| Arda Kardzhali | 2024–25 | First Professional Football League | 34 | 9 | 2 | 1 | — | | 1 (Note: Appearance in Parva Liga Conference League play-offs) | 0 | 37 | 10 |
| Baltika Kaliningrad | 2025–26 | Russian Premier League | 24 | 3 | 6 | 2 | — | | — | | 30 | 5 |
| Baltika Kaliningrad | 2026–27 | Russian Premier League | 10 | 2 | 3 | 0 | — | | — | | 13 | 2 |
| Baltika Kaliningrad | Total | | 34 | 5 | 9 | 2 | 0 | 0 | 0 | 0 | 43 | 7 |
| Career total | | | 201 | 41 | 19 | 3 | 1 | 0 | 7 | 1 | 228 | 45 |
