= Stanislav Ivanov (footballer, born 1999) =

Bulgarian association football player

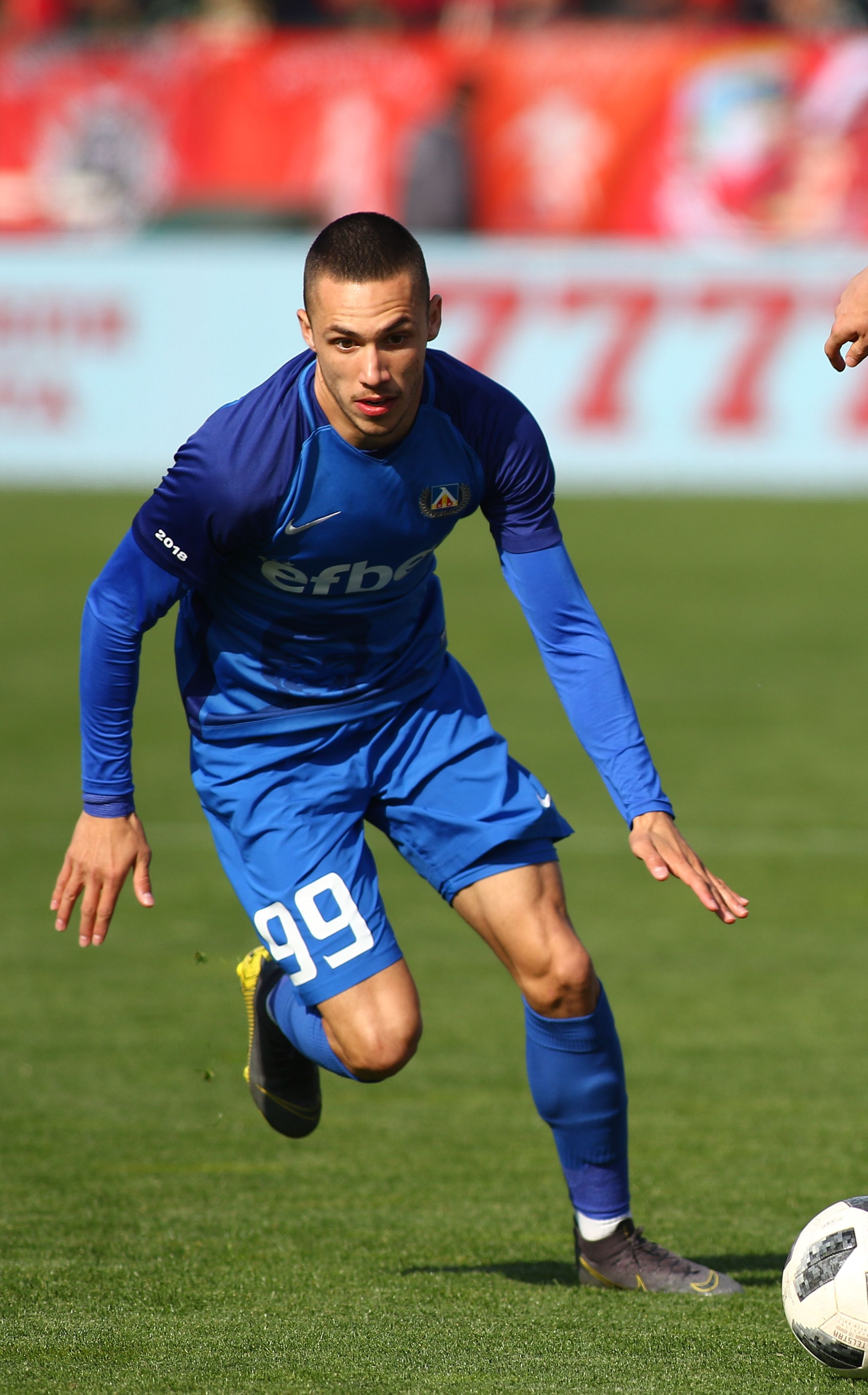
- Ivanov with Levski Sofia in 2019

Personal information
- Full name: Stanislav Ivaylov Ivanov
- Date of birth: 16 April 1999 (age 27)
- Place of birth: Gabrovo, Bulgaria
- Height: 1.77 m (5 ft 10 in)
- Position: Winger

Team information
- Current team: Arda Kardzhali
- Number: 91

Youth career
- 2005–2012: Yantra
- 2012–2016: Levski Sofia

Senior career*
Years	Team	Apps	(Gls)
2016–2021	Levski Sofia	75	(12)
2021–2022	Chicago Fire	26	(1)
2023–2025	Arda Kardzhali	83	(19)
2025–2026	Ludogorets Razgrad	13	(1)
2026–	Arda Kardzhali	7	(2)

International career^{‡}
2015–2016	Bulgaria U17	10	(6)
2016–2018	Bulgaria U19	19	(3)
2019–2020	Bulgaria U21	10	(4)
2023–	Bulgaria	8	(0)
- * Club domestic league appearances and goals as of 15:36, 6 October 2026 (UTC) ‡ National team caps and goals as of 6 October 2026

Stanislav Ivaylov Ivanov (Bulgarian: Станислав Ивайлов Иванов; born 16 April 1999) is a Bulgarian professional footballer who plays as a winger for First League club Arda Kardzhali and the Bulgaria national team.

== Club career ==
Born in Gabrovo, Ivanov began his football career playing for his hometown club Yantra at the age of six. In 2012, he joined Levski Sofia's youth academy. His first involvement in the first team was after coming on as a substitute and scoring the winning goal in a friendly game against Lazio on 23 May 2014, which finished 3–2.

Ivanov made his competitive debut for Levski at the age of 16 years and 10 months, in a 0–0 home league draw against Montana on 2 March 2016, coming on as a substitute for Miki Orachev. He began to establish himself in the Levski first team from the 2018–19 season, making 11 starts. His first senior goals came on 25 September 2018 when he scored twice in a 6–0 away win over Atletik Kuklen in the first round of the Bulgarian Cup. On 4 May 2019, Ivanov scored his first league goal in a 3–1 away win against Botev Plovdiv. He ended the season with four goals in 20 appearances in all competitions.

Ivanov continued his progress during 2019–20, becoming a regular in the midfield as a right winger. His form led to him being named Best Progressing Player in the Bulgarian First League for 2019. Over the course of the domestic campaign, Ivanov contributed 9 goals and 5 assists for the club.

On 9 December 2020, Stanislav joined Major League Soccer club Chicago Fire. He signed a two-year contract with an option for a further year, taking effect from 1 January 2021. He made his debut for Chicago on 21 July 2021, coming on as a substitute in their 2–2 draw against D.C. United. On 13 January 2023, Ivanov and Chicago mutually agreed to terminate his contract with the club.

On 13 June 2025 Ludogorets Razgrad announced Ivanov as their new signing, with a transfer fee of around 350 000 euro paid to Arda Kardzhali.

== International career ==
Ivanov was called up for the Bulgaria U19 team for the 2017 European Under-19 Championship qualification from 22 to 27 March 2017. After a draw and 2 wins the team qualified for the knockout phase which was held in July 2017. On 17 October 2023, he earned his first cap for the senior national team, coming on as a late second-half substitute for Lukas Petkov in the 0–2 loss against Albania in a friendly match.

== Career statistics ==
=== Club ===
As of 16 February 2026

Appearances and goals by club, season and competition
Club	Season	League			Cup		Continental		Other (Note: Includes Bulgarian Supercup matches.)		Total	
Club	Season	Division	Apps	Goals	Apps	Goals	Apps	Goals	Apps	Goals	Apps	Goals
Levski Sofia	First League	2015–16	1	0	0	0	—		—		1	0
Levski Sofia	First League	2016–17	12	0	0	0	0	0	1 (Note: Europa League play-off)	0	13	0
Levski Sofia	First League	2017–18	8	0	0	0	0	0	—		8	0
Levski Sofia	First League	2018–19	16	2	2	2	1	0	1 (Note: Europa League play-off)	0	20	4
Levski Sofia	First League	2019–20	27	9	4	0	4	0	—		35	9
Levski Sofia	First League	2020–21	11	1	0	0	—		—		11	1
Levski Sofia	Total		75	12	6	2	5	0	2	0	88	14
Chicago Fire	Major League Soccer	2021	11	0	0	0	—		—		11	0
Chicago Fire	Major League Soccer	2022	15	1	1	0	—		—		16	1
Chicago Fire	Total		26	1	1	0	0	0	0	0	27	1
Arda Kardzhali	First League	2022–23	12	2	1	0	—		1 (Note: Europa League play-off)	0	14	2
Arda Kardzhali	First League	2023–24	36	6	1	0	—		—		37	6
Arda Kardzhali	First League	2024–25	35	11	3	0	—		—		38	11
Arda Kardzhali	Total		83	19	5	0	0	0	1	0	89	19
Ludogorets Razgrad	First League	2025–26	11	1	1	0	12	1	0	0	24	2
Career total			195	33	13	2	17	1	3	0	228	36

=== International ===
As of match played 6 October 2026

Appearances and goals by national team and year
National team	Year	Apps	Goals
Bulgaria	2023	2	0
Bulgaria	2024	3	0
Bulgaria	2026	3	0
Total		8	0

== Honours ==
Individual

- Best Progressing Player in the Bulgarian First League: 2019
