= Jhon Espinoza =

Ecuador football player (born 1999)

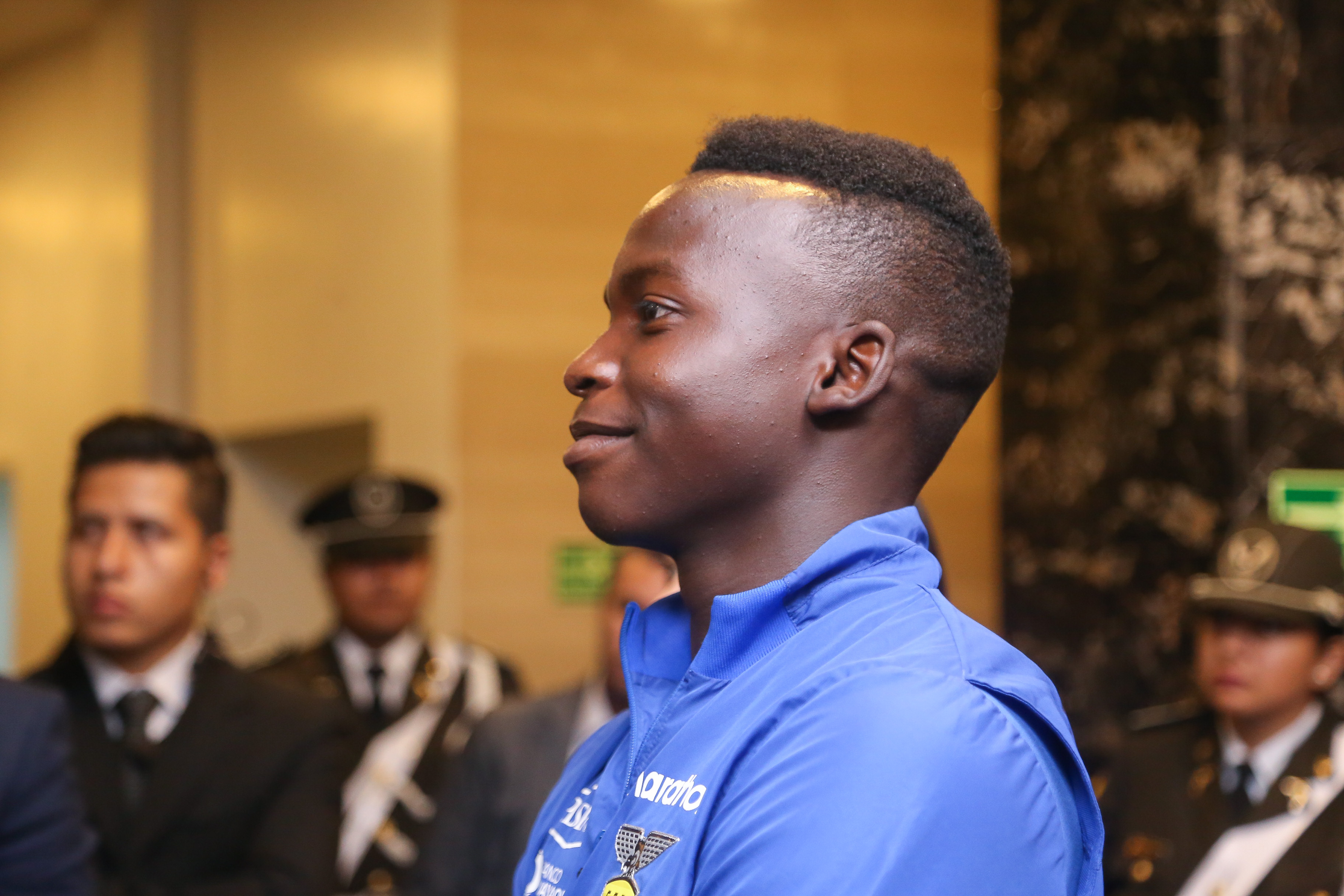
- Espinoza in 2019

Personal information
- Full name: Jhon Jairo Espinoza Izquierdo
- Date of birth: 24 February 1999 (age 27)
- Place of birth: Guayaquil, Ecuador
- Height: 5 ft 10 in (1.77 m)
- Position: Defender

Team information
- Current team: Independiente del Valle
- Number: 4

Youth career
- Cuenca

Senior career*
| Years | Team | Apps | (Gls) |
| 2017–2018 | Cuenca | 5 | (0) |
| 2018–2020 | Aucas | 51 | (0) |
| 2021–2022 | Chicago Fire | 39 | (0) |
| 2022 | Chicago Fire II | 4 | (0) |
| 2023–2024 | Lugano | 51 | (2) |
| 2024–2026 | Kasımpaşa | 32 | (0) |
| 2026– | Independiente del Valle | 16 | (0) |

International career^{‡}
| 2018–2019 | Ecuador U20 | 14 | (1) |
| 2019– | Ecuador | 2 | (0) |
Medal record
Men's football
Representing Ecuador
FIFA U-20 World Cup
| Third place | 2019 Poland |
- * Club domestic league appearances and goals as of 17 October 2026 ‡ National team caps and goals as of 13 October 2019

Jhon Jairo Espinoza Izquierdo (born 24 February 1999) is an Ecuadorian professional footballer who plays as a defender for Ecuadorian LigaPro Serie A club Independiente del Valle and the Ecuador national team.

== Club career ==
Born in Guayaquil, Espinoza began his career with Liga Pro club Cuenca, where he made his debut on 12 December 2017. A few games into the 2018 season, Espinoza moved to Aucas. He made his debut for the club on 30 July 2018 against Independiente Valle, starting in a 1–0 victory.

On 18 February 2020, Espinoza scored his first goal for Aucas in a 2–1 victory over Vélez Sarsfield in the Copa Sudamericana.

=== Chicago Fire ===
On 23 November 2020, Espinoza joined American Major League Soccer club Chicago Fire. He made his debut for the club on 24 June 2021 against Atlanta United, coming on as a late substitute in the 3–1 victory. On 27 December 2022, it was announced that Espinoza and Chicago had mutually agreed to terminate his deal immediately, and that he would join Swiss Super League side Lugano on 1 January 2023.

=== Lugano ===
On 27 December 2022, Espinoza signed a 1.5-year contract with Lugano in Switzerland.

=== Kasımpaşa ===
On 3 September 2024, Espinoza joined Kasımpaşa in Turkey.

== International career ==
Espinoza captained the Ecuadorian under-20 team at the 2019 FIFA U-20 World Cup, and scored the winning goal in a 2–1 win over the United States in the quarter-finals.

Espinoza made his senior debut in 2019. In a match against Argentina on 13 October 2019 Espinoza unfortunately scored an own goal in a 6–1 loss.

== Career statistics ==
=== Club ===
As of match played 13 August 2023

Appearances and goals by club, season and competition
| Club | Season | League | | | National cup (Note: Includes Copa Ecuador, U.S. Open Cup, Swiss Cup) | | Continental | | Total | |
| Club | Season | Division | Apps | Goals | Apps | Goals | Apps | Goals | Apps | Goals |
|---|---|---|---|---|---|---|---|---|---|---|
| Cuenca | 2017 | Serie A | 2 | 0 | 0 | 0 | – | | 2 | 0 |
| Cuenca | 2018 | Serie A | 3 | 0 | 0 | 0 | 0 | 0 | 3 | 0 |
| Cuenca | Total | | 5 | 0 | 0 | 0 | 0 | 0 | 5 | 0 |
| Aucas | 2018 | Serie A | 14 | 0 | 2 | 0 | – | | 16 | 0 |
| Aucas | 2019 | Serie A | 13 | 0 | 0 | 0 | – | | 13 | 0 |
| Aucas | 2020 | Serie A | 24 | 0 | 0 | 0 | 2 (Note: Appearances in Copa Sudamericana) | 1 | 26 | 1 |
| Aucas | Total | | 51 | 0 | 2 | 0 | 2 | 1 | 55 | 1 |
| Chicago Fire | 2021 | Major League Soccer | 20 | 0 | 0 | 0 | – | | 20 | 0 |
| Chicago Fire | 2022 | Major League Soccer | 19 | 0 | 1 | 0 | – | | 20 | 0 |
| Chicago Fire | Total | | 39 | 0 | 1 | 0 | – | | 40 | 0 |
| Lugano | 2022–23 | Swiss Super League | 16 | 0 | 2 | 0 | – | | 18 | 0 |
| Lugano | 2023–24 | Swiss Super League | 4 | 0 | 0 | 0 | – | | 4 | 0 |
| Lugano | Total | | 20 | 0 | 2 | 0 | – | | 22 | 0 |
| Career total | | | 115 | 0 | 5 | 0 | 2 | 1 | 122 | 1 |

=== International ===
As of match played 13 January 2019

Appearances and goals by national team and year
| National team | Year | Apps | Goals |
|---|---|---|---|
| Ecuador | 2019 | 2 | 0 |
| Total | | 2 | 0 |
