= Federico Navarro =

Argentine association football player

Personal information
- Full name: Federico Darío Navarro
- Date of birth: 9 March 2000 (age 26)
- Place of birth: Frontera, Argentina
- Height: 5 ft 8 in (1.72 m)
- Position: Defensive midfielder

Team information
- Current team: Rosario Central
- Number: 31

Youth career
- Deportivo Sebastian
- 2013–2018: Talleres

Senior career*
Years	Team	Apps	(Gls)
2018–2021	Talleres	43	(0)
2021–2024	Chicago Fire	74	(3)
2024	Chicago Fire II	1	(0)
2025–	Rosario Central	39	(0)

International career
2018	Argentina U19		
- * Club domestic league appearances and goals as of 17:14, 10 July 2026 (UTC)

Federico Darío Navarro (born 9 March 2000) is an Argentine professional footballer who plays as a defensive midfielder for Rosario Central in the Argentine Primera División.

== Club career ==
=== Talleres ===
Navarro was born in Frontera began his career with local side Deportivo Sebastian before joining the academy at Talleres in 2013. He went through the ranks at the club and in 2018 was promoted to the reserves. Prior to the 2018–19 season, Navarro was promoted to the first team by coach Juan Pablo Vojvoda. He made his professional debut for the club on 9 February 2019 in their 0–0 draw against Atlético Tucumán.

On 22 April 2021, Navarro made his Copa Sudamericana debut for Talleres in their 2–1 defeat against Emelec.

=== Chicago Fire ===
On 6 August 2021, it was announced that Navarro had signed with Major League Soccer club Chicago Fire for an undisclosed fee, with his contract lasting until 2025 and an option for the 2026 season. According to Talleres, the deal could go up to $5 million, with performance-related incentives.

=== Rosario Central ===
On 26 January 2025, Navarro returned to Argentina, signing with Rosario Central for an undisclosed transfer fee.

== International career ==
Navarro has represented Argentina at the under-19 level. He was part of the squad which participated in the South American Games in 2018.

== Career statistics ==
As of match played 1 August 2021

Appearances and goals by club, season and competition
Club	Season	League			National Cup		Continental		Total	
Club	Season	Division	Apps	Goals	Apps	Goals	Apps	Goals	Apps	Goals
Talleres	2018–19	Primera División	7	0	0	0	—		7	0
Talleres	2019–20	Primera División	10	0	3	0	—		13	0
Talleres	2020	Copa de la Liga Profesional	11	0	2	0	—		9	0
Talleres	2021	Primera División	15	0	0	0	2	0	17	0
Talleres	Total		43	0	5	0	1	0	51	0
Chicago Fire	2021	Major League Soccer	0	0	—		—		0	0
Career total			43	0	5	0	1	0	51	0

== Honours ==
Rosario Central

- Primera División: 2025 Liga
- Supercopa Internacional: 2026
