= Andre Reynolds II =

American soccer player (born 2001)

Personal information
- Full name: Andre Reynolds II
- Date of birth: May 2, 2001 (age 25)
- Place of birth: Chicago, Illinois, United States
- Height: 5 ft 9 in (1.75 m)
- Position: Full-back

Youth career
- 2015–2019: Chicago Fire

Senior career*
Years	Team	Apps	(Gls)
2019–2022	Chicago Fire	14	(0)
2021	→ Memphis 901 (loan)	22	(0)
2022	Chicago Fire II	6	(0)
- * Club domestic league appearances and goals as of October 10, 2022

Andre Reynolds II (born May 2, 2001) is an American professional soccer player who plays as a full-back.

== Club career ==
=== Chicago Fire ===
Born in Chicago, Illinois, Reynolds joined the academy side of local club Chicago Fire in 2015. On January 25, 2019, Reynolds signed a homegrown player deal with the Fire, joining the club's first team in Major League Soccer. With his signing, Reynolds became only the first academy player from the city of Chicago and the second-youngest academy signing for the club. Prior to signing with the Chicago Fire, Reynolds had already committed to playing college soccer with the Brown Bears.

On July 23, 2019, Reynolds made his professional debut for the Chicago Fire against Cruz Azul in the Leagues Cup. He started and played 58 minutes as the Fire were defeated 2–0. He then made his Major League Soccer debut on September 27, 2020, against Atlanta United, coming on as a second half stoppage-time substitute in a 2–0 victory.

Following the 2022 season, Reynolds was released by Chicago.

==== Memphis 901 (loan) ====
On May 14, 2021, it was announced that Reynolds had joined USL Championship side Memphis 901 on loan for the 2021 season. He made his debut for the club on May 23, 2021, as a starter in a 2–2 draw against Atlanta United 2.

== Career statistics ==
As of match played August 25, 2021

Appearances and goals by club, season and competition
Club	Season	League			National cup		Continental		Total	
Club	Season	Division	Apps	Goals	Apps	Goals	Apps	Goals	Apps	Goals
Chicago Fire	2019	Major League Soccer	0	0	0	0	1 (Note: Appearance(s) in Leagues Cup)	0	1	0
Chicago Fire	2020	Major League Soccer	2	0	—		—		2	0
Chicago Fire	Total		2	0	0	0	1	0	3	0
Memphis 901 (loan)	2021	USL Championship	15	0	—		—		15	0
Career total			17	0	0	0	1	0	18	0
