= 2022 Major League Soccer season =

27th season of Major League Soccer

Major League Soccer
- Season: 2022
- Dates: February 26 – October 9 (regular season); October 15 – November 5 (playoffs)
- Teams: 28
- MLS Cup: Los Angeles FC (1st title)
- Supporters' Shield: Los Angeles FC (2nd shield)
- Champions League (United States): Austin FC; Los Angeles FC; Orlando City SC; Philadelphia Union
- Champions League (Canada): Vancouver Whitecaps FC
- Matches: 476
- Goals: 1,409 (2.96 per match)
- Top goalscorer: Hany Mukhtar (23 goals)
- Biggest home win: 7 goals: Philadelphia 7–0 D.C. (July 8)
- Biggest away win: 6 goals: D.C. 0–6 Philadelphia (August 20)
- Highest scoring: 9 goals: New York City 5–4 Toronto (April 24); Portland 7–2 Kansas City (May 14); Red Bulls 4–5 Colorado (August 2)
- Longest winning run: 7 matches LAFC (July 9–August 17)
- Longest unbeaten run: 11 matches Cincinnati (July 23–September 27)
- Longest winless run: 10 matches Chicago (April 2–May 28)
- Longest losing run: 5 matches Toronto (April 24–May 14 and September 4–October 9)
- Total attendance: 10,011,578
- Average attendance: 21,033

The 2022 Major League Soccer season was the 27th season of Major League Soccer (MLS), the top professional soccer league in the United States and Canada. The league had 28 clubs following the addition of Charlotte FC as an expansion team.

The regular season began on February 26 and concluded on October 9. The playoffs began on October 15 and concluded with MLS Cup 2022 on November 5, fifteen days prior to the start of the 2022 FIFA World Cup. New York City FC entered the season as defending champions, having defeated the Portland Timbers in MLS Cup 2021, while the New England Revolution entered the season as the reigning Supporters' Shield winners. Western Conference regular season and playoff champions, Los Angeles FC won their second Supporters' Shield and their first MLS Cup, defeating the Eastern Conference regular season and playoff champions, the Philadelphia Union, in a penalty shootout.

A total of 476 matches were played over the course of the regular season and drew an average attendance of 21,038. Total attendance reached a record 10 million, but most teams in the league saw a decline in attendance since the 2019 season. In addition, this was the first season where all stadiums were open to full capacity since the 2019 season.

== Teams ==
=== Stadiums and locations ===
Locations of teams for the 2022 Major League Soccer season
Western Conference Eastern Conference

Team	Stadium	Capacity
Atlanta United FC	Mercedes-Benz Stadium	42,500
Austin FC	Q2 Stadium	20,738
Charlotte FC	Bank of America Stadium	40,000
Chicago Fire FC	Soldier Field	24,955
FC Cincinnati	TQL Stadium	26,000
Colorado Rapids	Dick's Sporting Goods Park	18,061
Columbus Crew	Lower.com Field	20,011
FC Dallas	Toyota Stadium	20,500
D.C. United	Audi Field	20,000
Houston Dynamo FC	PNC Stadium	22,039
LA Galaxy	Dignity Health Sports Park	27,000
Los Angeles FC	Banc of California Stadium	22,000
Minnesota United FC	Allianz Field	19,400
Inter Miami CF	DRV PNK Stadium	18,000
CF Montréal	Saputo Stadium	19,619
Nashville SC	Geodis Park	30,000
New England Revolution	Gillette Stadium	20,000
New York City FC	Yankee Stadium	30,321
New York Red Bulls	Red Bull Arena	25,000
Orlando City SC	Exploria Stadium	25,500
Philadelphia Union	Subaru Park	18,500
Portland Timbers	Providence Park	25,218
Real Salt Lake	America First Field	20,213
San Jose Earthquakes	PayPal Park	18,000
Seattle Sounders FC	Lumen Field	37,722
Sporting Kansas City	Children's Mercy Park	18,467
Toronto FC	BMO Field	28,351
Vancouver Whitecaps FC	BC Place	22,120

1. Non-soccer specific stadium and artificially reduced capacity.
2. Temporary stadium.
3. Nashville SC played the first two months of its schedule on the road, with Geodis Park opening on May 1.
4. Additional home matches were played at Citi Field in Queens, New York, and Red Bull Arena in Harrison, New Jersey, due to Yankee Stadium being unavailable for certain matches.
5. Three home matches were moved to SeatGeek Stadium in Bridgeview, Illinois, due to scheduling conflicts with the Chicago Bears.

=== Personnel and sponsorships ===
Note: All teams use Adidas as universal kit manufacturer.

Team	Head coach	Captain	Shirt sponsor	Sleeve sponsor
Atlanta United FC	(Mexico) Gonzalo Pineda	(United States) Brad Guzan	American Family Insurance	Piedmont Hospital
Austin FC	(United States) Josh Wolff	(Finland) Alexander Ring	Yeti	Netspend
Charlotte FC	(Italy) Christian Lattanzio (interim)	(Austria) Christian Fuchs	Ally	Centene
Chicago Fire FC	(Saint Vincent and the Grenadines) Ezra Hendrickson	(Germany) Rafael Czichos	Motorola	CIBC
FC Cincinnati	(United States) Pat Noonan	(Argentina) Luciano Acosta	Mercy Health	Kroger
Colorado Rapids	(United States) Robin Fraser	(England) Jack Price	—	
Columbus Crew	(United States) Caleb Porter (until October 10)	(Ghana) Jonathan Mensah	Nationwide	Tipico
D.C. United	(England) Wayne Rooney	(United States) Steve Birnbaum	XDC Network	EagleBank
FC Dallas	(Spain) Nico Estévez	(United States) Matt Hedges	MTX Group	AdvoCare
Houston Dynamo FC	(United States) Kenny Bundy (interim)	(United States) Tim Parker	MD Anderson	—
Inter Miami CF	(England) Phil Neville	(Brazil) Gregore	XBTO	Xmanna
LA Galaxy	(United States) Greg Vanney	(Mexico) Javier Hernández	Herbalife	Honey
Los Angeles FC	(United States) Steve Cherundolo	(Mexico) Carlos Vela	Flex	Target
Minnesota United FC	(England) Adrian Heath	(United States) Wil Trapp	Target	Bell Bank
CF Montréal	(France) Wilfried Nancy	(Canada) Samuel Piette	Bank of Montreal	—
Nashville SC	(England) Gary Smith	(United States) Dax McCarty	Renasant Bank	Hyundai
New England Revolution	(United States) Bruce Arena	(Spain) Carles Gil	UnitedHealth	Santander
New York City FC	(England) Nick Cushing (interim)	(United States) Sean Johnson	Etihad Airways	Dude Wipes
New York Red Bulls	(Austria) Gerhard Struber	(United States) Aaron Long	Red Bull	OANDA
Orlando City SC	(Colombia) Óscar Pareja	(Uruguay) Mauricio Pereyra	Orlando Health	Exploria
Philadelphia Union	(United States) Jim Curtin	(United States) Alejandro Bedoya	Bimbo Bakeries USA	Subaru
Portland Timbers	(Venezuela) Giovanni Savarese	(Colombia) Diego Chara	Alaska Airlines	TikTok
Real Salt Lake	(United States) Pablo Mastroeni	(Croatia) Damir Kreilach	LifeVantage	KeyBank, Ford
San Jose Earthquakes	(Spain) Alex Covelo (interim)	(United States) Jackson Yueill	Intermedia	PayPal, Adobe
Seattle Sounders FC	(United States) Brian Schmetzer	(Uruguay) Nicolás Lodeiro	Zulily	Emerald Queen Casino
Sporting Kansas City	(United States) Peter Vermes	(Scotland) Johnny Russell	Compass Minerals	—
Toronto FC	(United States) Bob Bradley	(United States) Michael Bradley	Bank of Montreal	GE Appliances
Vancouver Whitecaps FC	(Italy) Vanni Sartini	(Canada) Russell Teibert	Bell Canada	—

=== Coaching changes ===
Team	Outgoing coach	Manner of departure	Date of vacancy	Position in table	Incoming coach	Date of appointment
Houston Dynamo FC	(United States) Tab Ramos	Fired	November 4, 2021	Pre-season	(Brazil) Paulo Nagamura	January 3, 2022
Los Angeles FC	(United States) Bob Bradley	Mutual consent	November 18, 2021	Pre-season	(United States) Steve Cherundolo	January 3, 2022
Toronto FC	(Spain) Javier Pérez	Mutual consent	November 23, 2021	Pre-season	(United States) Bob Bradley	November 24, 2021
Chicago Fire FC	(United States) Frank Klopas (interim)	End of interim period	November 24, 2021	Pre-season	(Saint Vincent and the Grenadines) Ezra Hendrickson	November 24, 2021
FC Dallas	(United States) Marco Ferruzzi (interim)	End of interim period	December 2, 2021	Pre-season	(Spain) Nico Estévez	December 2, 2021
FC Cincinnati	(Jamaica) Tyrone Marshall (interim)	End of interim period	December 14, 2021	Pre-season	(United States) Pat Noonan	December 14, 2021
San Jose Earthquakes	(Argentina) Matías Almeyda	Mutual consent	April 18, 2022	14th in West, 28th overall	(Spain) Alex Covelo (interim)	April 18, 2022
D.C. United	(Argentina) Hernán Losada	Fired	April 20, 2022	14th in East, 25th overall	(United States) Chad Ashton (interim)	April 20, 2022
Charlotte FC	(Spain) Miguel Ángel Ramírez	Fired	May 31, 2022	8th in East, 18th overall	(Italy) Christian Lattanzio (interim)	May 31, 2022
New York City FC	(Norway) Ronny Deila	Signed by (Belgium) Standard Liège	June 13, 2022	1st in East, 2nd overall	(England) Nick Cushing (interim)	June 13, 2022
D.C. United	(United States) Chad Ashton (interim)	End of interim period	July 12, 2022	13th in East, 25th overall	(England) Wayne Rooney	July 12, 2022
Houston Dynamo FC	(Brazil) Paulo Nagamura	Fired	September 5, 2022	14th in West, 27th overall	(United States) Kenny Bundy (interim)	September 5, 2022
Columbus Crew	(United States) Caleb Porter	Fired	October 10, 2022	Post-season	TBD	TBD

== Regular season ==
=== Format ===
Each team played 34 matches, including 17 home games and 17 away games.

- All teams played every Conference opponent twice – home and away, plus eight cross-conference games against different opponents within the regular season.

=== Conference standings ===
==== Eastern Conference ====
Pos	Team	Pld	W	L	T	GF	GA	GD	Pts	Qualification
1	Philadelphia Union	34	19	5	10	72	26	+46	67	Qualification for the conference semifinals and the CONCACAF Champions League
2	CF Montréal (Note: Canadian clubs could not qualify for the 2023 CONCACAF Champions League through the MLS regular season or playoffs.)	34	20	9	5	63	50	+13	65	Qualification for the first round
3	New York City FC	34	16	11	7	57	41	+16	55	Qualification for the first round
4	New York Red Bulls	34	15	11	8	50	41	+9	53	Qualification for the first round
5	FC Cincinnati	34	12	9	13	64	56	+8	49	Qualification for the first round
6	Inter Miami CF	34	14	14	6	47	56	−9	48	Qualification for the first round
7	Orlando City SC	34	14	14	6	44	53	−9	48	Qualification for the first round and the CONCACAF Champions League (Note: as 2022 U.S. Open Cup champions)
8	Columbus Crew	34	10	8	16	46	41	+5	46	
9	Charlotte FC	34	13	18	3	44	52	−8	42	
10	New England Revolution	34	10	12	12	47	50	−3	42	
11	Atlanta United FC	34	10	14	10	48	54	−6	40	
12	Chicago Fire FC	34	10	15	9	39	48	−9	39	
13	Toronto FC	34	9	18	7	49	66	−17	34	
14	D.C. United	34	7	21	6	36	71	−35	27	

Source: MLS
Rules for classification: 1) points; 2) total wins; 3) total goal differential; 4) total goals scored; 5) fewer disciplinary points; 6) away goal differential; 7) away goals scored; 8) home goals differential; 9) home goals scored; 10) coin toss (2 clubs tied) or drawing of lots (≥3 clubs tied)

==== Western Conference ====
Pos	Team	Pld	W	L	T	GF	GA	GD	Pts	Qualification
1	Los Angeles FC	34	21	9	4	66	38	+28	67	Qualification for the conference semifinals and the CONCACAF Champions League
2	Austin FC	34	16	10	8	65	49	+16	56	Qualification for the first round and the CONCACAF Champions League
3	FC Dallas	34	14	9	11	48	37	+11	53	Qualification for the first round
4	LA Galaxy	34	14	12	8	58	51	+7	50	Qualification for the first round
5	Nashville SC	34	13	10	11	52	41	+11	50	Qualification for the first round
6	Minnesota United FC	34	14	14	6	48	51	−3	48	Qualification for the first round
7	Real Salt Lake	34	12	11	11	43	45	−2	47	Qualification for the first round
8	Portland Timbers	34	11	10	13	53	53	0	46	
9	Vancouver Whitecaps FC (Note: Canadian clubs could not qualify for the 2023 CONCACAF Champions League through the MLS regular season or playoffs.)	34	12	15	7	40	57	−17	43	Qualification for the CONCACAF Champions League (Note: as 2022 Canadian Championship winners.)
10	Colorado Rapids	34	11	13	10	46	57	−11	43	
11	Seattle Sounders FC	34	12	17	5	47	46	+1	41	
12	Sporting Kansas City	34	11	16	7	42	54	−12	40	
13	Houston Dynamo FC	34	10	18	6	43	56	−13	36	
14	San Jose Earthquakes	34	8	15	11	52	69	−17	35	

Source: MLS
Rules for classification: 1) points; 2) total wins; 3) total goal differential; 4) total goals scored; 5) fewer disciplinary points; 6) away goal differential; 7) away goals scored; 8) home goals differential; 9) home goals scored; 10) coin toss (2 clubs tied) or drawing of lots (≥3 clubs tied)

=== Overall table ===
The leading team in this table won the Supporters' Shield.

Pos	Team	Pld	W	L	T	GF	GA	GD	Pts	
1	Los Angeles FC (C, S)	34	21	9	4	66	38	+28	67	Qualification for the CONCACAF Champions League (Note: As MLS Cup 2022 champions and 2022 MLS Supporters' Shield champions (USA1))
2	Philadelphia Union	34	19	5	10	72	26	+46	67	Qualification for the CONCACAF Champions League (Note: As 2022 Eastern Conference regular season champions (USA2))
3	CF Montréal (Note: Canadian clubs could not qualify for the 2023 CONCACAF Champions League through the MLS regular season or playoffs.)	34	20	9	5	63	50	+13	65	
4	Austin FC	34	16	10	8	65	49	+16	56	Qualification for the CONCACAF Champions League (Note: As highest-ranked U.S. based Division I club (based on 2022 MLS regular season record) not already qualified (USA3))
5	New York City FC	34	16	11	7	57	41	+16	55	
6	New York Red Bulls	34	15	11	8	50	41	+9	53	
7	FC Dallas	34	14	9	11	48	37	+11	53	
8	LA Galaxy	34	14	12	8	58	51	+7	50	
9	Nashville SC	34	13	10	11	52	41	+11	50	
10	FC Cincinnati	34	12	9	13	64	56	+8	49	
11	Minnesota United FC	34	14	14	6	48	51	−3	48	
12	Inter Miami CF	34	14	14	6	47	56	−9	48	
13	Orlando City SC (U)	34	14	14	6	44	53	−9	48	Qualification for the CONCACAF Champions League (Note: As 2022 U.S. Open Cup champions (USA4))
14	Real Salt Lake	34	12	11	11	43	45	−2	47	
15	Portland Timbers	34	11	10	13	53	53	0	46	
16	Columbus Crew	34	10	8	16	46	41	+5	46	
17	Vancouver Whitecaps FC (V)	34	12	15	7	40	57	−17	43	Qualification for the CONCACAF Champions League (Note: As 2022 Canadian Championship winners (CAN1))
18	Colorado Rapids	34	11	13	10	46	57	−11	43	
19	Charlotte FC	34	13	18	3	44	52	−8	42	
20	New England Revolution	34	10	12	12	47	50	−3	42	
21	Seattle Sounders FC	34	12	17	5	47	46	+1	41	
22	Sporting Kansas City	34	11	16	7	42	54	−12	40	
23	Atlanta United FC	34	10	14	10	48	54	−6	40	
24	Chicago Fire FC	34	10	15	9	39	48	−9	39	
25	Houston Dynamo FC	34	10	18	6	43	56	−13	36	
26	San Jose Earthquakes	34	8	15	11	52	69	−17	35	
27	Toronto FC	34	9	18	7	49	66	−17	34	
28	D.C. United	34	7	21	6	36	71	−35	27	

Source: MLS
Rules for classification: 1) points; 2) total wins; 3) total goal differential; 4) total goals scored; 5) fewer disciplinary points; 6) away goal differential; 7) away goals scored; 8) home goals differential; 9) home goals scored; 10) coin toss (2 clubs tied) or drawing of lots (≥3 clubs tied)
(C) Champions; (S) Supporters' Shield winners; (U) U.S. Open Cup winners; (V) Canadian Championship winners

=== Results ===
Home \ Away	ATL	AUS	CHI	CIN	CLB	CLT	COL	DAL	DCU	HOU	LAX	LFC	MIA	MIN	MTL	NEW	NSH	NYC	NYR	ORL	PHI	POR	RSL	SEA	SJO	SKC	TOR	VAN
Atlanta United		0–3	4–1	0–0	1–2	2–1			3–2				2–0		3–3	2–2		1–2	1–2	1–1	0–0		2–1	2–1		3–1	4–2	
Austin FC				5–0			1–1	2–2		3–1	0–1	4–1	5–1	1–0			1–1		3–4	2–2		1–2	3–0	1–1	3–3	4–3		3–0
Chicago Fire	0–0			1–2	2–3	2–3		0–0	1–0		0–0		3–1		0–2	1–1		0–2	1–2	0–0	1–0			1–0		3–1	2–0	
FC Cincinnati	2–2		2–3		2–2	2–0			0–1			1–2	3–1		3–4	2–3	1–1	4–4	1–1	1–0	3–1				6–0		2–0	2–2
Columbus Crew	2–2		0–0	2–0		1–1			3–0			0–2	1–0		1–2	0–0	0–1	3–2	2–1	0–2	0–0	1–1					2–1	4–0
Charlotte FC	1–0	0–1	2–3	2–0	2–2				3–0		0–1		1–0		0–2	3–1	4–1	1–0	2–0	1–2	4–0						0–2	2–1
Colorado Rapids	3–0	2–3			1–1	0–0		1–0		1–1	2–0	2–0		4–3			1–3			1–1		2–0	1–1	1–0	2–1	2–0		3–1
FC Dallas		1–1					3–1			2–1	1–0	2–1	1–1	1–2			2–0	0–1			1–0	4–1	1–1	2–0	4–1	2–1	1–1	0–2
D.C. United	0–1	2–3	0–2	2–5	2–2	3–0	0–0			2–0			2–3		1–2	3–2	1–3	0–2	0–0	2–1	0–6						2–2	
Houston Dynamo		1–2	2–0			1–2	1–1	2–2			1–3	2–1		1–2	2–3	3–1	2–0					0–0	0–0	0–1	4–3	0–0		2–1
LA Galaxy	2–0	4–1					4–1	1–3		0–3		2–1		2–3	4–0		1–0	1–0		0–1		1–1	1–1	3–3	2–3	2–2		5–2
Los Angeles FC		1–2				5–0	3–0	3–1	1–0	3–1	3–2			2–0			0–1		2–0		2–2	1–1	2–0	2–1	3–2	3–1		3–1
Inter Miami	2–1		0–0	4–4	2–1	3–2			2–2	1–3		0–2		2–1	1–3	3–2		3–2	2–0	4–1	1–2	2–1					2–1	
Minnesota United		2–1	3–0	0–1			3–1	0–3	2–0	2–1	1–1	1–1					1–1	0–1				4–4	3–2	1–2	1–0	1–1		2–0
CF Montréal	2–1	0–1	3–2	4–3	2–2	2–1			1–0				2–2			4–0		0–0	0–1	4–1	1–2		1–2			1–2	1–0	2–1
New England Revolution	2–1		0–0	2–2	2–2	2–1		1–0	1–0		1–2		2–0	2–1	0–1			3–0	0–1	1–1	1–1		2–3				0–0	
Nashville SC	2–2	3–0					4–1	4–0		1–2	1–1	1–2		1–2	2–1						1–1	2–2	2–0	1–0	0–0	1–2	3–4	1–1
New York City FC	2–2		1–0	1–1	2–0	1–3	1–1		1–2				2–0		4–1	4–2			2–0	2–1	0–2		6–0		3–0	0–0	5–4	
New York Red Bulls	2–1		3–3	1–1	1–1	2–0	4–5	0–0	4–1				3–1	0–1	1–2	2–1		0–1		0–1	0–2	1–1					2–0	
Orlando City SC	0–1		1–0	1–2	2–1	2–1		1–3	3–5	2–1		2–4	1–0		2–0	0–3		2–1	0–3		0–1			3–2			4–0	
Philadelphia Union	4–1		4–1	1–1	1–0	2–0	6–0		7–0	6–0			0–0	1–1	1–1	2–1		2–1	1–1	5–1					2–0		4–0	
Portland Timbers	2–1	1–0					3–0	1–1		2–1	1–3	1–2		1–0		2–2	1–1			1–1	0–2		0–0	2–1	2–1	7–2		1–1
Real Salt Lake		2–1		1–2	0–0		2–2	0–1	0–0	3–0	1–0	1–4		3–0			2–1					3–1		1–0	2–0	3–0	2–2	1–1
Seattle Sounders FC		3–0		1–1		2–1	2–1	1–0		2–1	3–2	1–1	0–1	3–1	1–2		0–1					0–3	1–2		2–2	3–0		4–0
San Jose Earthquakes		2–2	2–1		3–3		1–0	1–1		1–2	2–3	2–1	0–1	2–0			2–2		1–3			3–2	2–2	4–3		1–1		2–0
Sporting Kansas City		0–2			0–0		2–1	2–2	3–0	1–0	4–2	0–2		4–1		1–2	1–2		0–1			4–1	1–0	1–0	1–0			0–1
Toronto FC	2–1		3–2	1–2	1–2	4–0			2–1		2–2		0–1		3–4	2–2		2–1	1–4	0–1	2–1	3–1		0–2	2–2			
Vancouver Whitecaps FC		2–0	1–3				2–1	2–1		2–1	3–0	1–0		1–3		0–0	0–3	0–0				2–3	2–1	2–1	3–3	1–0	1–0	

Source: Flashscore
Legend: Blue = home team win; Yellow = draw; Red = away team win.
For upcoming matches, an "a" indicates there is an article about the rivalry between the two participants.

=== MLS All-Star Game ===
2022 MLS All-Star Game
August 10, 2022
7:30 p.m. CDT (8:30 p.m. EDT)

MLS All-Stars (United States) (Canada)	2–1	(Mexico) Liga MX All-Stars
Vela 3'; Ruidíaz 73' (pen.)	Report	Álvarez 83'

Allianz Field, Saint Paul, Minnesota
Attendance: 19,727
Referee: Joe Dickerson (United States)

== MLS Cup playoffs ==
=== Bracket ===
First round October 15–17	Conference semifinals October 20–23
E1	Philadelphia Union	1
E5	FC Cincinnati	0
E4	New York Red Bulls	1
E5	FC Cincinnati	2
Eastern Conference
E3	New York City FC	3
E6	Inter Miami CF	0
E3	New York City FC	3
E2	CF Montréal	1
E2	CF Montréal	2
E7	Orlando City SC	0
W1	Los Angeles FC	3
W4	LA Galaxy	2
W4	LA Galaxy	1
W5	Nashville SC	0
Western Conference
W3	FC Dallas (p)	1 (5)
W6	Minnesota United FC	1 (4)
W3	FC Dallas	1
W2	Austin FC	2
W2	Austin FC (p)	2 (3)
W7	Real Salt Lake	2 (1)

Conference finals October 30
E1	Philadelphia Union	3
E3	New York City FC	1
W1	Los Angeles FC	3
W2	Austin FC	0

MLS Cup; November 5
E1	Philadelphia Union	3 (0)
W1	Los Angeles FC (p)	3 (3)

Note: The higher seeded teams hosted matches, with the MLS Cup host determined by overall points.

=== MLS Cup ===
November 5, 2022
1:00 p.m. PDT

Los Angeles FC	3–3 (a.e.t.)	Philadelphia Union
Acosta 28'; Murillo 83'; Bale 120+8'	Report	Gazdag 59'; Elliott 85', 120+4'
Penalties
Tello (penalty missed); Bouanga (penalty scored); Hollingshead (penalty scored); Ilie (penalty scored)	3–0	(penalty missed) Gazdag; (penalty missed) Martínez; (penalty missed) Wagner

Banc of California Stadium, Los Angeles, California
Attendance: 22,384
Referee: Ismail Elfath

== Player statistics ==
=== Goals ===
Rank	Player	Club	Goals
1	(Germany) Hany Mukhtar	Nashville SC	23
2	(Argentina) Sebastián Driussi	Austin FC	22
2	(Hungary) Dániel Gazdag	Philadelphia Union	22
4	(Brazil) Brenner	FC Cincinnati	18
4	(United States) Jesús Ferreira	FC Dallas	18
4	(Mexico) Javier Hernández	LA Galaxy	18
4	(United States) Brandon Vázquez	FC Cincinnati	18
8	(United States) Jeremy Ebobisse	San Jose Earthquakes	17
9	(Colombia) Cristian Arango	Los Angeles FC	16
9	(Argentina) Gonzalo Higuaín	Inter Miami CF	16
9	(Chile) Diego Rubio	Colorado Rapids	16

=== Hat-tricks ===
Player	For	Against	Score	Date
(Mexico) Carlos Vela	Los Angeles FC	Colorado Rapids	3–0 (H)	February 26, 2022
(Scotland) Lewis Morgan	New York Red Bulls	Toronto FC	4–1 (A)	March 5, 2022
(United States) Jesús Ferreira	FC Dallas	Portland Timbers	4–1 (H)	March 19, 2022
(Ecuador) Leonardo Campana	Inter Miami CF	New England Revolution	3–2 (H)	April 9, 2022
(Argentina) Valentín Castellanos^{4}	New York City FC	Real Salt Lake	6–0 (H)	April 17, 2022
(Argentina) Cristian Espinoza	San Jose Earthquakes	Seattle Sounders FC	4–3 (H)	April 23, 2022
(Mexico) Ronaldo Cisneros	Atlanta United FC	Chicago Fire FC	4–1 (H)	May 7, 2022
(Brazil) Brenner	FC Cincinnati	New York City FC	4–4 (H)	June 29, 2022
(Greece) Taxiarchis Fountas	D.C. United	Orlando City SC	5–3 (A)	July 4, 2022
(Argentina) Julián Carranza	Philadelphia Union	D.C. United	7–0 (H)	July 8, 2022
(Argentina) Gonzalo Higuaín	Inter Miami CF	FC Cincinnati	4–4 (H)	July 30, 2022
(United States) Gyasi Zardes	Colorado Rapids	Minnesota United FC	4–3 (H)	August 6, 2022
(Argentina) Julián Carranza	Philadelphia Union	D.C. United	6–0 (A)	August 20, 2022
(Hungary) Dániel Gazdag	Philadelphia Union	Colorado Rapids	6–0 (H)	August 27, 2022
(Germany) Hany Mukhtar	Nashville SC	Colorado Rapids	4–1 (H)	August 31, 2022
(Mexico) Juanjo Purata	Atlanta United FC	Toronto FC	4–2 (H)	September 10, 2022
(Brazil) Brenner	FC Cincinnati	San Jose Earthquakes	6–0 (H)	September 10, 2022
(Senegal) Moussa Djitté	Austin FC	Real Salt Lake	3–0 (H)	September 14, 2022
(Mexico) Daniel Ríos^{4}	Charlotte FC	Philadelphia Union	4–0 (H)	October 1, 2022
(Brazil) Brenner	FC Cincinnati	D.C. United	5–2 (A)	October 9, 2022
(Hungary) Dániel Gazdag	Philadelphia Union	Toronto FC	4–0 (H)	October 9, 2022

Notes

(H) – Home team
(A) – Away team
^{4} Scored 4 goals

=== Assists ===
Rank	Player	Club	Assists
1	(Argentina) Luciano Acosta	FC Cincinnati	19
2	(Uruguay) Diego Fagúndez	Austin FC	15
2	(Germany) Kai Wagner	Philadelphia Union	15
4	(Argentina) Cristian Espinoza	San Jose Earthquakes	14
4	(Spain) Carles Gil	New England Revolution	14
6	(Uruguay) Santiago Rodríguez	New York City FC	13
7	(Argentina) Thiago Almada	Atlanta United FC	12
7	(Armenia) Lucas Zelarayán	Columbus Crew	12
9	(Uruguay) Nicolás Lodeiro	Seattle Sounders FC	11
9	(Germany) Hany Mukhtar	Nashville SC	11
9	(Uruguay) Mauricio Pereyra	Orlando City SC	11
9	(Argentina) Emanuel Reynoso	Minnesota United FC	11
9	(Switzerland) Xherdan Shaqiri	Chicago Fire FC	11
9	(Mexico) Carlos Vela	Los Angeles FC	11

=== Clean sheets ===
Rank	Player	Club	Clean sheets
1	(Jamaica) Andre Blake	Philadelphia Union	15
2	(United States) Sean Johnson	New York City FC	14
3	(United States) Gabriel Slonina	Chicago Fire FC	12
4	(United States) Zac MacMath	Real Salt Lake	10
5	(Canada) Maxime Crépeau	Los Angeles FC	9
5	(Peru) Pedro Gallese	Orlando City SC	9
5	(Curaçao) Eloy Room	Columbus Crew	9
5	(United States) Joe Willis	Nashville SC	9
5	(United States) William Yarbrough	Colorado Rapids	9
10	(Brazil) Carlos Coronel	New York Red Bulls	8
10	(Netherlands) Maarten Paes	FC Dallas	8
10	(United States) Brad Stuver	Austin FC	8

== Awards ==
=== Team/Player of the Week ===
- **Bold** denotes League Player of the Week.

Team of the Week
Week	Goalkeeper	Defenders	Midfielders	Forwards	Bench	Coach
1	(United States) Hamid (DC)	(Canada) Edwards (LA) (Brazil) Carlos (ORL) (Canada) Marshall-Rutty (TOR)	(Paraguay) Domínguez (ATX) (Spain) Sánchez (LAFC) (Panama) Godoy (NSH) (Armenia) Zelarayán (CLB) (Colombia) Y. Chará (POR)	(Venezuela) Martínez (ATL) (Mexico) **Vela** (LAFC)	(United States) Slonina (CHI) (Jamaica) Lowe (MIA) (United States) Amaya (RBNY) (Spain) Gil (NE) (Finland) Lod (MIN) (Ecuador) Estrada (DC) (Mexico) Hernández (LA)	(England) Gary Smith (NSH)
2	(Canada) Hasal (VAN)	(Mali) Dibassy (MIN) (Costa Rica) Calvo (SJ) (Senegal) Fall (LAFC)	(Scotland) **Morgan** (RBNY) (Argentina) Driussi (ATX) (Spain) Gil (NE) (Armenia) Zelarayán (CLB) (Mexico) Álvarez (LA)	(Chile) Rubio (COL) (Colombia) Y. Chará (POR)	(United States) MacMath (RSL) (United States) Zimmerman (NSH) (United States) Delgado (LA) (France) Walter (SKC) (Hungary) Gazdag (PHI) (United States) Finlay (ATX) (Poland) Klimala (RBNY)	(United States) Josh Wolff (ATX)
3	(Canada) **St. Clair** (MIN)	(United States) Glad (RSL) (New Zealand) Tuiloma (POR) (United States) Omsberg (CHI)	(Colombia) Quintero (HOU) (Canada) Kaye (COL) (Spain) Sánchez (LAFC) (Armenia) Zelarayán (CLB)	(Brazil) Magno (NYC) (United States) Vázquez (CIN) (Argentina) Velasco (DAL)	(United States) Slonina (CHI) (Ecuador) Arreaga (SEA) (United States) Harriel (PHI) (Colombia) D. Chará (POR) (United States) Bender (CLT) (Haiti) Etienne (CLB) (Chile) Rubio (COL)	(United States) Pat Noonan (CIN)
4	(United States) MacMath (RSL)	(United States) Hollingshead (LAFC) (United States) Zimmerman (NSH) (United States) Harriel (PHI)	(Canada) Petrasso (TOR) (Canada) Koné (MTL) (United States) Nagbe (CLB) (United States) C. Roldan (SEA)	(United States) Vázquez (CIN) (United States) **Ferreira** (DAL) (Poland) Świderski (CLT)	(Peru) Gallese (ORL) (Mali) Dibassy (MIN) (Costa Rica) Matarrita (CIN) (United States) Lennon (ATL) (United States) Schmitt (RSL) (Mexico) Vela (LAFC) (Poland) Przybyłko (CHI)	(Spain) Miguel Ángel Ramírez (CLT)
5	(Brazil) Coronel (RBNY)	(Ghana) Abubakar (COL) (Colombia) Murillo (LAFC) (United States) Blackmon (VAN)	(Canada) Osorio (TOR) (Brazil) Paulo (SEA) (United States) Mihailovic (MTL) (Argentina) Moreno (ATL)	(Argentina) Carranza (PHI) (Mexico) **Hernández** (LA) (United States) Picault (HOU)	(United States) Bono (TOR) (Republic of Ireland) Williams (LA) (United States) Washington (NSH) (Spain) Sánchez (LAFC) (Hungary) Gazdag (PHI) (United States) Cowell (SJ) (Sierra Leone) Kamara (MTL)	(United States) Steve Cherundolo (LAFC)
6	(Croatia) Kahlina (CLT)	(United States) Romney (NSH) (France) Camacho (MTL) (England) Elliott (PHI)	(France) Grandsir (LA) (Costa Rica) Leal (NSH) (Ecuador) Alcívar (CLT) (Colombia) Y. Chará (POR)	(Ecuador) **Campana** (MIA) (United States) J. Ferreira (DAL) (Paraguay) S. Ferreira (HOU)	(Jamaica) Blake (PHI) (New Zealand) Boxall (MIN) (United States) Servania (DAL) (Scotland) Gauld (VAN) (Mexico) Hernández (LA) (United States) Ebobisse (SJ) (Brazil) Pato (ORL)	(Spain) Miguel Ángel Ramírez (CLT)
7	(Slovenia) Ivačič (POR)	(Zambia) Mabika (MIA) (Norway) Gabrielsen (ATX) (Senegal) Fall (LAFC)	(Uruguay) Torres (ORL) (Spain) Pozuelo (TOR) (United States) Mihailovic (MTL) (Germany) Mukhtar (NSH) (Finland) Lod (MIN)	(Argentina) **Castellanos** (NYC) (United States) Ebobisse (SJ)	(United States) Kann (CIN) (Democratic Republic of the Congo) Mavinga (TOR) (United States) Polster (NE) (Argentina) Reynoso (MIN) (Uruguay) Fagúndez (ATX) (Libya) Tajouri-Shradi (LAFC) (Brazil) Andrade (NYC)	(United States) Bob Bradley (TOR)
8	(United States) Yarbrough (COL)	(Republic of Ireland) Williams (LA) (United States) Long (RBNY) (United States) Ford (SKC)	(Greece) Fountas (DC) (Argentina) Reynoso (MIN) (United States) Acosta (LAFC) (Argentina) **Espinoza** (SJ)	(Argentina) Urruti (ATX) (Ecuador) Campana (MIA) (Spain) Jiménez (TOR)	(United States) Celentano (CIN) (New Zealand) Tuiloma (POR) (Argentina) Driussi (ATX) (Spain) Gil (NE) (Uruguay) Lodeiro (SEA) (Argentina) Velasco (DAL) (Argentina) Castellanos (NYC)	(Spain) Alex Covelo (SJ)
9	(Jamaica) Blake (PHI)	(Portugal) Santos (CLB) (Canada) **Miller** (MTL) (Uruguay) Silva (RSL) (Brazil) Ruan (ORL)	(Argentina) Acosta (CIN) (Spain) Gil (NE) (Canada) Kaye (COL) (United States) Parks (NYC) (Argentina) Driussi (ATX)	(Poland) Klimala (RBNY)	(United States) Tarbell (ATX) (United States) Herrera (RSL) (Ecuador) Palacios (LAFC) (United States) Nagbe (CLB) (United States) Mihailovic (MTL) (Brazil) Magno (NYC) (Hungary) Sallói (SKC)	(United States) Steve Cherundolo (LAFC)
10	(United States) Celentano (CIN)	(United States) Romney (NSH) (United States) Long (RBNY) (Brazil) Nathan (SJ)	(Hungary) Gazdag (PHI) (United States) Delgado (LA) (Argentina) Acosta (CIN) (Greece) Fountas (DC)	(United States) Arriola (DAL) (Mexico) **Cisneros** (ATL) (Argentina) Torres (MTL)	(United States) Marcinkowski (SJ) (United States) Hines-Ike (DC) (Haiti) Etienne (CLB) (United States) McCarty (NSH) (Colombia) Moreno (POR) (Canada) Ricketts (VAN) (Brazil) Shinyashiki (CLT)	(United States) Pat Noonan (CIN)
11	(Peru) Gallese (ORL)	(United States) Brody (RSL) (United States) Trusty (COL) (Canada) Johnston (MTL)	(Brazil) Luquinhas (RBNY) (United States) C. Roldan (SEA) (Argentina) **Blanco** (POR) (Argentina) Almada (ATL) (Greece) Fountas (DC)	(United States) Ferreira (DAL) (Poland) Buksa (NE)	(Canada) Breza (MTL) (United States) Smith (ORL) (Panama) Carrasquilla (HOU) (Argentina) Moralez (NYC) (Argentina) Acosta (CIN) (Brazil) Fogaça (POR) (United States) Ebobisse (SJ)	(United States) Robin Fraser (COL)
12	(United States) Stuver (ATX)	(Peru) Callens (NYC) (Jamaica) Lowe (MIA) (Norway) Gabrielsen (ATX)	(Switzerland) Shaqiri (CHI) (Cape Verde) **Monteiro** (SJ) (Germany) Mukhtar (NSH) (Argentina) Driussi (ATX)	(Canada) Cavallini (VAN) (Peru) Ruidíaz (SEA) (Hungary) Sallói (SKC)	(United States) Callender (MIA) (Colombia) Yeimar (SEA) (United States) Muyl (NSH) (United States) Morales (NYC) (United States) Yueill (SJ) (Argentina) Reynoso (MIN) (United States) Fernandez (RBNY)	(United States) Josh Wolff (ATX)
13	(United States) Callender (MIA)	(Germany) Wagner (PHI) (Peru) Callens (NYC) (United States) Bye (NE)	(Argentina) Almada (ATL) (England) Price (COL) (Argentina) Ruiz (RSL) (Argentina) Driussi (ATX)	(Mexico) Vela (LAFC) (United States) Sapong (NSH) (Paraguay) **Ferreira** (HOU)	(United States) Clark (HOU) (United States) Taylor (MIN) (United States) McNamara (NE) (United States) Bedoya (PHI) (United States) Arriola (DAL) (Ecuador) Estrada (DC) (Mexico) Ríos (CLT)	(England) Phil Neville (MIA)
14	(Curaçao) Room (CLB)	(United States) Glad (RSL) (Peru) Callens (NYC) (El Salvador) A. Roldan (SEA)	(United States) Arriola (DAL) (Brazil) Luquinhas (RBNY) (Spain) Pozuelo (TOR) (Uruguay) Rodríguez (LAFC)	(Honduras) Quioto (MTL) (Serbia) **Joveljić** (LA) (Germany) Mukhtar (NSH)	(United States) Johnson (NYC) (Ghana) Mensah (CLB) (Spain) Gil (NE) (Scotland) Morgan (RBNY) (Finland) Taylor (MIA) (United States) Ebobisse (SJ) (Canada) Cavallini (VAN)	(England) Gary Smith (NSH)
15	(Brazil) Coronel (RBNY)	(Republic of Ireland) Gallagher (ATX) (United States) Ragen (SEA) (United States) Zusi (SKC)	(Brazil) Magno (NYC) (Brazil) **Luquinhas** (RBNY) (Nigeria) Nwobodo (CIN) (Venezuela) Savarino (RSL)	(Argentina) Bou (NE) (Venezuela) Martínez (ATL) (Peru) Ruidíaz (SEA)	(United States) Stuver (ATX) (Uruguay) Silva (RSL) (United States) Morris (CLB) (Paraguay) Cubas (VAN) (Germany) Herbers (CHI) (Serbia) Joveljić (LA) (Austria) Kara (ORL)	(United States) Josh Wolff (ATX)
16	(Serbia) Petrović (NE)	(Ecuador) Palacios (LAFC) (New Zealand) Tuiloma (POR) (Sweden) Lundqvist (HOU)	(United States) Vassilev (MIA) (Canada) Osorio (TOR) (Venezuela) Martinez (PHI) (United States) C. Roldan (SEA)	(Germany) **Mukhtar** (NSH) (Poland) Niezgoda (POR) (Honduras) Quioto (MTL)	(Peru) Gallese (ORL) (Colombia) Murillo (LAFC) (England) Elliott (PHI) (Argentina) Driussi (ATX) (United States) Duke (MIA) (United States) Morris (SEA) (Mexico) Vela (LAFC)	(United States) Jim Curtin (PHI)
17	(Curaçao) Room (CLB)	(Colombia) Terán (CHI) (United States) Ibeagha (LAFC) (United States) Nealis (RBNY)	(Venezuela) Pereira (ATX) (Argentina) Navarro (CHI) (Argentina) Reynoso (MIN) (Colombia) Moreno (POR)	(Brazil) **Brenner** (CIN) (United States) Toye (MTL) (Mexico) Vela (LAFC)	(United States) Stuver (ATX) (Canada) Waterman (MTL) (Ecuador) Cifuentes (LAFC) (Argentina) Acosta (CIN) (United States) Ngoma (RBNY) (Canada) Russell-Rowe (CLB) (Brazil) Héber (NYC)	(France) Wilfried Nancy (MTL)
18	(Jamaica) Blake (PHI)	(Republic of Ireland) Gallagher (ATX) (United States) Long (RBNY) (Mexico) Araujo (LA)	(Argentina) Reynoso (MIN) (United States) Williamson (POR) (Paraguay) Cubas (VAN) (Madagascar) Raveloson (LA)	(United States) Kikanovic (SJ) (Argentina) Castellanos (NYC) (Greece) **Fountas** (DC)	(United States) Marcinkowski (SJ) (Jamaica) Lowe (MIA) (United States) Davis (NSH) (Argentina) Driussi (ATX) (Uruguay) Lodeiro (SEA) (Argentina) Bou (NE) (Brazil) Shinyashiki (CLT)	(United States) Greg Vanney (LA)
19	(United States) Stuver (ATX)	(Austria) Fuchs (CLT) (Zimbabwe) Hadebe (HOU) (Ghana) Abubakar (COL)	(United States) Finlay (ATX) (Ecuador) Cifuentes (LAFC) (United States) Bedoya (PHI) (Haiti) Etienne (CLB)	(Argentina) **Carranza** (PHI) (Argentina) Castellanos (NYC) (Poland) Niezgoda (POR)	(Slovenia) Ivačič (POR) (England) Elliott (PHI) (Uruguay) Araújo (ORL) (Honduras) Espinoza (SKC) (Canada) Osorio (TOR) (Mexico) Vela (LAFC) (Colombia) Hernández (CLB)	(Venezuela) Giovanni Savarese (POR)
20	(Peru) Gallese (ORL)	(Germany) Wagner (PHI) (Luxembourg) Chanot (NYC) (France) Isimat-Mirin (SKC)	(Costa Rica) Leal (NSH) (Cape Verde) Monteiro (SJ) (Scotland) Gauld (VAN) (Uruguay) Fagúndez (ATX)	(Mexico) Cisneros (ATL) (Colombia) Hernández (CLB) (Colombia) **Durán** (CHI)	(United States) Marcinkowski (SJ) (Norway) Gabrielsen (ATX) (Colombia) Dájome (VAN) (Scotland) Russell (SKC) (Germany) Mukhtar (NSH) (Brazil) Brenner (CIN) (Serbia) Joveljić (LA)	(Mexico) Gonzalo Pineda (ATL)
21	(United States) Bono (TOR)	(United States) Parker (HOU) (Germany) Czichos (CHI) (Mexico) Purata (ATL)	(Uruguay) Rodríguez (NYC) (Ecuador) Cifuentes (LAFC) (Argentina) **Reynoso** (MIN) (Armenia) Zelarayán (CLB)	(United States) Lewis (COL) (Argentina) Higuaín (MIA) (Venezuela) Savarino (RSL)	(Canada) Boehmer (VAN) (Germany) Wagner (PHI) (Colombia) D. Chará (POR) (Brazil) Gregore (MIA) (Peru) Reyna (CLT) (Uruguay) Fagúndez (ATX) (Colombia) Hernández (CLB)	(Saint Vincent and the Grenadines) Ezra Hendrickson (CHI)
22	(Slovenia) Ivačič (POR)	(Norway) Glesnes (PHI) (United States) Kessler (NE) (New Zealand) Boxall (MIN)	(United States) Morris (SEA) (United States) **Bradley** (TOR) (Switzerland) Shaqiri (CHI) (England) Yearwood (RBNY) (South Africa) Hlongwane (MIN)	(Colombia) Arango (LAFC) (Honduras) Quioto (MTL)	(Netherlands) Paes (DAL) (Germany) Czichos (CHI) (Argentina) Driussi (ATX) (Argentina) Moralez (NYC) (Uruguay) Lodeiro (SEA) (Italy) Bernardeschi (TOR) (Colombia) Asprilla (POR)	(Austria) Gerhard Struber (RBNY)
23	(Serbia) Petrović (NE)	(Canada) Miller (MTL) (Italy) Chiellini (LAFC) (Norway) Glesnes (PHI)	(United States) Bedoya (PHI) (Scotland) Gauld (VAN) (Argentina) Driussi (ATX) (Argentina) Blanco (POR)	(Denmark) Uhre (PHI) (Argentina) **Higuaín** (MIA) (Paraguay) Amarilla (MIN)	(Netherlands) Paes (DAL) (Mexico) Purata (ATL) (Argentina) Espinoza (SJ) (Germany) Mukhtar (NSH) (Greece) Fountas (DC) (Mexico) Vela (LAFC) (United States) Vázquez (CIN)	(England) Wayne Rooney (DC)
24	(United States) Callender (MIA)	(United States) Gutman (ATL) (Canada) Waterman (MTL) (United States) Kessler (NE) (Argentina) Barreal (CIN)	(Armenia) Zelarayán (CLB) (Canada) Osorio (TOR) (Argentina) Driussi (ATX)	(Colombia) Arango (LAFC) (United States) **Zardes** (COL) (Poland) Przybyłko (CHI)	(Serbia) Petrović (NE) (Serbia) Veselinović (VAN) (Switzerland) Shaqiri (CHI) (Italy) Insigne (TOR) (Colombia) Moreno (POR) (Chile) Rubio (COL) (Nigeria) Agada (SKC)	(United States) Robin Fraser (COL)
25	(Canada) St. Clair (MIN)	(United States) Brody (RSL) (England) Elliott (PHI) (Canada) Laryea (TOR)	(Spain) **Pozuelo** (MIA) (Argentina) Driussi (ATX) (Ecuador) Cifuentes (LAFC) (Spain) Gil (NE)	(France) Grandsir (LA) (Argentina) Carranza (PHI) (Argentina) Velasco (DAL)	(Serbia) Petrović (NE) (Finland) Lappalainen (MTL) (Argentina) Almada (ATL) (Uruguay) Torres (ORL) (Italy) Insigne (TOR) (United States) Ferreira (DAL) (Venezuela) Córdova (RSL)	(United States) Steve Cherundolo (LAFC)
26	(Canada) Hasal (VAN)	(United States) Tolkin (RBNY) (United States) Miazga (CIN) (Jamaica) Lowe (MIA) (United States) Thompson (SJ)	(Germany) Mukhtar (NSH) (Argentina) Reynoso (MIN) (Scotland) Gauld (VAN)	(Nigeria) Agada (SKC) (Argentina) **Carranza** (PHI) (Honduras) Quioto (MTL)	(United States) Pulskamp (SKC) (Italy) Criscito (TOR) (Uruguay) Araújo (ORL) (Uruguay) Rodríguez (NYC) (Ghana) Opoku (LAFC) (Colombia) Hernández (CLB) (Peru) Ruidíaz (SEA)	(England) Adrian Heath (MIN)
27	(Canada) Breza (MTL)	(Germany) Wagner (PHI) (United States) Maher (NSH) (France) Moreira (CLB)	(Germany) Thommy (SKC) (Venezuela) Casseres Jr. (RBNY) (Hungary) **Gazdag** (PHI) (Uruguay) Torres (ORL)	(Uruguay) Fagúndez (ATX) (Mexico) Hernández (LA) (Italy) Bernardeschi (TOR)	(England) Bond (LA) (Costa Rica) Cascante (ATX) (Argentina) Velasco (DAL) (Colombia) Asprilla (POR) (Italy) Insigne (TOR) (Paraguay) Amarilla (MIN) (Canada) Akindele (ORL)	(United States) Josh Wolff (ATX)
28	(United States) Clark (HOU)	(United States) Birnbaum (DCU) (United States) McGraw (POR) (Australia) Degenek (CLB)	(United States) Williamson (POR) (Germany) **Mukhtar** (NSH) (Spain) Puig (LA) (Panama) Carrasquilla (HOU)	(Scotland) Morgan (RBNY) (Denmark) Uhre (PHI) (Uruguay) Torres (ORL)	(Serbia) Petrović (NE) (United States) Parker (HOU) (France) Moreira (CLB) (Costa Rica) Leal (NSH) (Hungary) Gazdag (PHI) (Brazil) Costa (LA) (Venezuela) Savarino (RSL)	(Brazil) Paulo Nagamura (HOU)
29	(Serbia) Petrović (NE)	(Cameroon) Tolo (SEA) (Brazil) Rodrigues (SJ) (United States) Zimmerman (NSH) (United States) Hollingshead (LAFC)	(Argentina) Acosta (CIN) (Hungary) Gazdag (PHI) (United States) Lletget (DAL) (United States) Mihailovic (MTL)	(Sierra Leone) Kamara (MTL) (Germany) **Mukhtar** (NSH)	(United States) Slonina (CHI) (United States) Hagglund (CIN) (Chile) Gutierrez (COL) (Argentina) Velasco (DAL) (Colombia) Moreno (POR) (Italy) Insigne (TOR) (Mexico) Hernández (LA)	(United States) Jim Curtin (PHI)
30	(Slovenia) Ivačič (POR)	(England) Elliott (PHI) (Mexico) Purata (ATL) (Colombia) Yeimar (SEA)	(Spain) Puig (LA) (Kenya) Wanyama (MTL) (Argentina) Acosta (CIN) (Argentina) Almada (ATL)	(Brazil) **Brenner** (CIN) (Peru) Ruidíaz (SEA) (United States) J. Ferreira (DAL)	(Mexico) Ochoa (DCU) (France) Malanda (CLT) (Germany) Wagner (PHI) (United States) Leyva (SEA) (Venezuela) Casseres (RBNY) (Colombia) Durán (CHI) (United States) Zardes (COL)	(United States) Jim Curtin (PHI)
31	(Serbia) Petrović (NE)	(United States) Gutman (ATL) (Germany) Voloder (SKC) (United States) Rosenberry (COL)	(United States) Picault (HOU) (Argentina) Alamda (ATL) (Ecuador) Vite (VAN) (Mexico) Vela (LAFC)	(Argentina) Higuaín (MIA) (Senegal) **Djitté** (ATX) (Sierra Leone) Kamara (MTL)	(United States) Stuver (ATX) (United States) Kallman (MIN) (Canada) Koné (MTL) (Germany) Thommy (SKC) (Spain) Pozuelo (MIA) (Switzerland) Shaqiri (CHI) (United States) Baird (HOU)	(United States) Josh Wolff (ATX)
32	(Jamaica) Blake (PHI)	(Canada) Johnston (MTL) (Peru) Callens (NYC) (Germany) Gressel (VAN)	(Uruguay) Torres (ORL) (Spain) Puig (LA) (Uruguay) Brugman (LA) (Colombia) Moreno (POR)	(Poland) **Świderski** (CLT) (Brazil) Brenner (CIN) (Nigeria) Agada (SKC)	(United States) Celentano (CIN) (Norway) Glesnes (PHI) (Uruguay) Rodríguez (NYC) (Germany) Mukhtar (NSH) (United States) Ebobisse (SJ) (Mexico) Vela (LAFC) (Argentina) Higuaín (MIA)	(England) Nick Cushing (NYC)
33	(Canada) Hasal (VAN)	(Peru) Callens (NYC) (Italy) Corbo (MTL) (Brazil) Nathan (SJ)	(Haiti) Etienne (CLB) (Scotland) Gauld (VAN) (United States) Gutiérrez (CHI) (Gabon) Bouanga (LAFC)	(Colombia) Durán (CHI) (Mexico) **Ríos** (CLT) (Paraguay) Ferreira (HOU)	(Switzerland) Frei (SEA) (Argentina) Bravo (POR) (Spain) C. Gil (NE) (Chile) Rubio (COL) (Brazil) Costa (LA) (Argentina) Higuaín (MIA) (Brazil) Magno (NYC)	(United States) Steve Cherundolo (LAFC)
34	(United States) Willis (NSH)	(England) Elliott (PHI) (United States) Kallman (MIN) (Costa Rica) Oviedo (RSL)	(Hungary) Gazdag (PHI) (United States) Mihailovic (MTL) (Uruguay) Lodeiro (SEA) (Brazil) Urso (ORL)	(Brazil) Manoel (RBNY) (Brazil) **Brenner** (CIN) (Venezuela) Savarino (RSL)	(Brazil) Coronel (RBNY) (United States) Moore (NSH) (Uruguay) Brugman (LA) (United States) Lletget (DAL) (Argentina) Fragapane (MIN) (Uruguay) Torres (ORL) (United States) Vázquez (CIN)	(United States) Pablo Mastroeni (RSL)

=== Goal of the Week ===
Goal of the Week
Week	Player	Club	Ref.
1	(Colombia) Yimmi Chará	Portland Timbers	
2	(Mexico) Efraín Álvarez	LA Galaxy	
3	(Argentina) Alan Velasco	FC Dallas	
4	(Argentina) Thiago Almada	Atlanta United FC	
5	(Brazil) João Paulo	Seattle Sounders FC	
6	(Ecuador) Jordy Alcívar	Charlotte FC	
7	(Libya) Ismael Tajouri-Shradi	Los Angeles FC	
8	(Ecuador) Leonardo Campana	Inter Miami CF	
9	(Paraguay) Sebastián Ferreira	Houston Dynamo FC	
10	(Mexico) Ronaldo Cisneros	Atlanta United FC	
11	(United States) Cristian Roldan	Seattle Sounders FC	
12	(Peru) Raúl Ruidíaz	Seattle Sounders FC	
13	(Poland) Adam Buksa	New England Revolution	
14	(Peru) Raúl Ruidíaz	Seattle Sounders FC	
15	(Brazil) Luquinhas	New York Red Bulls	
16	(Brazil) Luiz Araújo	Atlanta United FC	
17	(Venezuela) Daniel Pereira	Austin FC	
18	(United States) Sean Davis	Nashville SC	
19	(Honduras) Roger Espinoza	Sporting Kansas City	
20	(Uruguay) Diego Fagúndez	Austin FC	
21	(Peru) Yordy Reyna	Charlotte FC	
22	(Argentina) Sebastián Driussi	Austin FC	
23	(Argentina) Gonzalo Higuaín	Inter Miami CF	
24	(Wales) Gareth Bale	Los Angeles FC	
25	(Argentina) Thiago Almada	Atlanta United FC	
26	(Italy) Domenico Criscito	Toronto FC	
27	(Uruguay) Diego Fagúndez	Austin FC	
28	(Spain) Riqui Puig	LA Galaxy	
29	(United States) Djordje Mihailovic	CF Montréal	
30	(Argentina) Thiago Almada	Atlanta United FC	
31	(Mexico) Carlos Vela	Los Angeles FC	
32	(Mexico) Javier Hernández	LA Galaxy	
33	(Venezuela) Josef Martínez	Atlanta United FC	
34	(Brazil) Brenner	FC Cincinnati	

=== Player of the Month ===
Month	Player	Club	Stats	Ref.
February/March	(Armenia) Lucas Zelarayán	Columbus Crew	4 games played, 4 goals, 1 assist	
April	(Argentina) Sebastián Driussi	Austin FC	5 games played, 4 goals, 1 assist	
May	(United States) Paul Arriola	FC Dallas	5 games played, 6 goals	
June	(Argentina) Luciano Acosta	FC Cincinnati	3 games played, 1 goal, 3 assists	
July	(Argentina) Sebastián Driussi	Austin FC	6 games played, 5 goals, 3 assists	
August	(Germany) Hany Mukhtar	Nashville SC	7 games played, 7 goals, 5 assists	
September/October	(Brazil) Brenner	FC Cincinnati	5 games played, 9 goals, 2 assists	

=== End-of-season awards ===
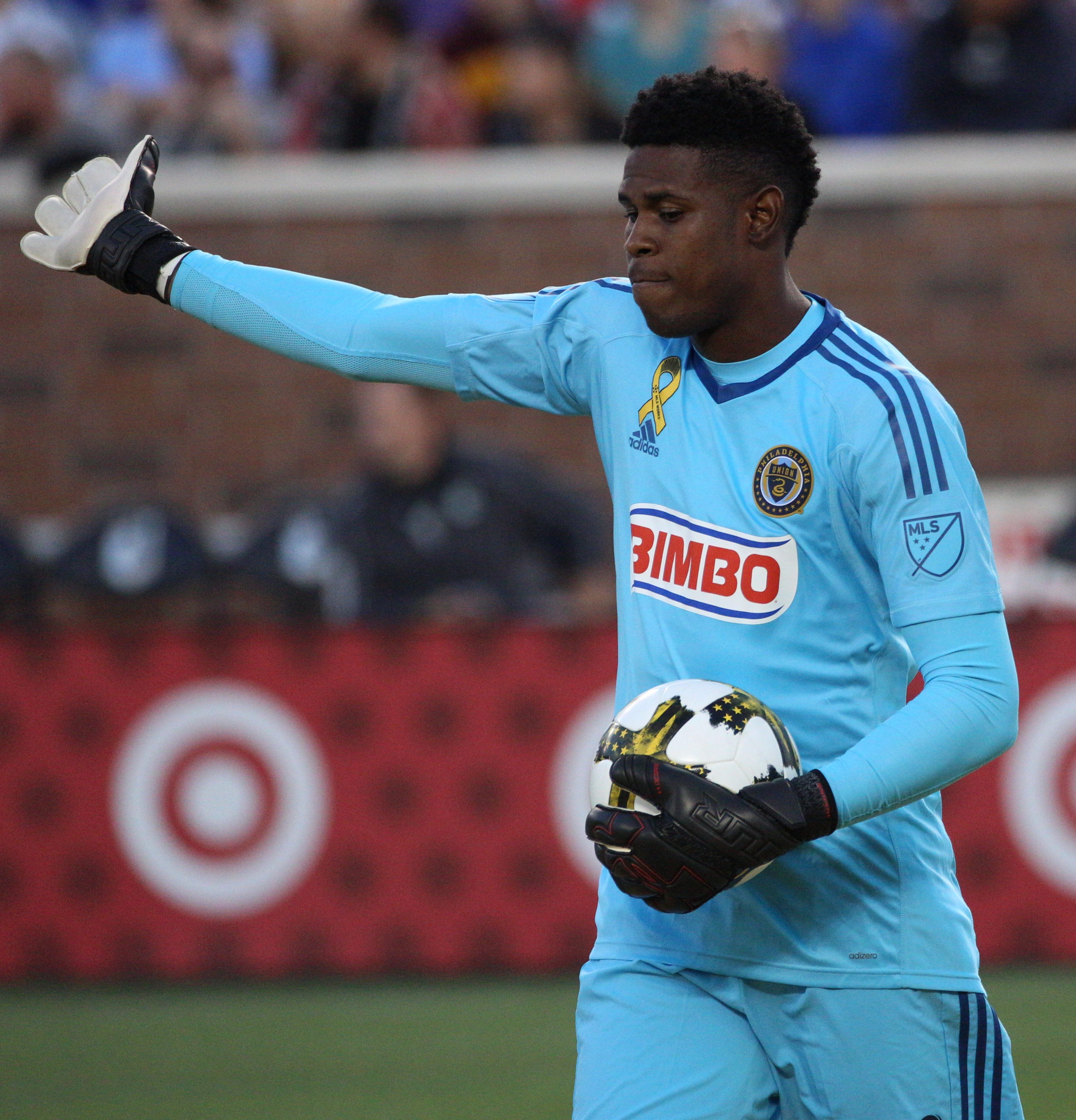
Winning his third Goalkeeper of the Year in 2022, Andre Blake has won the award more than any other goalkeeper.

Award	Winner (club)	Ref.
Most Valuable Player	Hany Mukhtar (Nashville SC)	
Defender of the Year	Jakob Glesnes (Philadelphia Union)	
Goalkeeper of the Year	Andre Blake (Philadelphia Union)	
Coach of the Year	Jim Curtin (Philadelphia Union)	
Young Player of the Year	Jesús Ferreira (FC Dallas)	
Newcomer of the Year	Thiago Almada (Atlanta United FC)	
Comeback Player of the Year	Gonzalo Higuaín (Inter Miami CF)	
Golden Boot	Hany Mukhtar (Nashville SC)	
Humanitarian of the Year	Alejandro Bedoya (Philadelphia Union)	
Referee of the Year	Ismail Elfath	
Assistant Referee of the Year	Corey Rockwell	
Goal of the Year	Josef Martínez (Atlanta United FC)	
Save of the Year	Pedro Gallese (Orlando City SC)	

=== MLS Best XI ===
Goalkeeper	Defenders	Midfielders	Forwards	Ref.
(Jamaica) Andre Blake, Philadelphia	(Norway) Jakob Glesnes, Philadelphia (Germany) Kai Wagner, Philadelphia (United States) Walker Zimmerman, Nashville	(Argentina) Luciano Acosta, Cincinnati (Argentina) Sebastián Driussi, Austin (Hungary) Dániel Gazdag, Philadelphia (Germany) Hany Mukhtar, Nashville	(United States) Jesús Ferreira, Dallas (United States) Brandon Vázquez, Cincinnati (Mexico) Carlos Vela, LAFC	
