= 2022 Chicago Fire FC season =

Chicago Fire FC
2022 season
- Chairman: Joe Mansueto
- Head coach: Ezra Hendrickson
- Stadium: Soldier Field (capacity: 61,500)
- MLS: Conference: 12th Overall: 24th
- MLS Cup Playoffs: DNQ
- U.S. Open Cup: 3rd Round
- Top goalscorer: Jhon Durán, 8 goals
- Highest home attendance: 30,282 (4/16 vs LA Galaxy)
- Lowest home attendance: 9,352 (3/19 vs Sporting Kansas City)
- Average home league attendance: 15,848
- Biggest win: DC 0–2 CHI (3/12); CHI 3–1 SKC (3/19); CHI 2–0 TOR; VAN 1–3 CHI (7/23); CHI 3–1 MIA
- Biggest defeat: MIN 3–0 CHI (4/23); ATL 4–1 CHI (5/7); PHI 4–1 CHI (8/13)
| Home colors | Away colors |

The 2022 Chicago Fire FC season was the club's 24th year of existence, as well as their 25th in Major League Soccer. On November 24, 2021, the Fire announced Columbus Crew assistant coach Ezra Hendrickson as the new head coach, making him the tenth full-time head coach in club history. For the fifth straight season and 12th season in club history, the Fire failed to qualify for the MLS Cup Playoffs. The Fire would begin with an unbeaten record in their first four games (2-0-2), but would start a 10-game winless run where the club went 0-7-3 following their 3–1 victory over Sporting Kansas City on March 19. Following an international break from May 29 until June 17, the Fire then went 6-3-1 over their next ten games, which ultimately led them to a 2-5-3 record to finish the season. The club also lost to Union Omaha on penalties in the Third Round of the Open Cup, their worst ever performance in the competition. Despite failing to make the playoffs, goalkeeper Gabriel Slonina set the club record for clean sheets in a season with 12 following the Fire's 0–0 draw with the Columbus Crew on September 3. Slonina would be sold to Chelsea on August 2 for a club record fee, with a loan back for the remainder of the season. On the reverse, the Fire also signed Swiss midfielder Xherdan Shaqiri for a club-record fee on February 9.

== Current squad ==
Players signed as of August 5, 2022

| No. | Name | Nationality | Position | Date of birth (age) | Previous club | Player Notes |
Goalkeepers
| 1 | Gabriel Slonina | (United States) | G | May 15, 2004 (aged 18) | (England) Chelsea F.C. | Loaned In |
| 18 | Spencer Richey | (United States) | G | May 30, 1992 (aged 30) | (United States) Seattle Sounders FC | |
| 34 | Chris Brady | (United States) | G | March 3, 2004 (aged 18) | (United States) Chicago Fire Academy | Homegrown |
Defenders
| 2 | Boris Sekulić | (Slovakia) | D | October 21, 1991 (aged 30) | (Poland) Górnik Zabrze | International |
| 3 | Jonathan Bornstein | (United States) | D | November 7, 1984 (aged 37) | (Israel) Maccabi Netanya F.C. | |
| 5 | Rafael Czichos | (Germany) | D | May 14, 1990 (aged 32) | (Germany) 1. FC Köln | Captain; International |
| 6 | Miguel Navarro | (Venezuela) | D | February 26, 1999 (aged 23) | (Venezuela) Deportivo La Guaira F.C. | |
| 14 | Jhon Espinoza | (Ecuador) | D | February 24, 1999 (aged 23) | (Ecuador) S.D. Aucas | |
| 20 | Wyatt Omsberg | (United States) | D | September 21, 1995 (aged 27) | (United States) Minnesota United FC | |
| 22 | Mauricio Pineda | (United States) | D | October 17, 1997 (aged 24) | (United States) North Carolina Tar Heels | Homegrown |
| 23 | Carlos Terán | (Colombia) | D | September 24, 2000 (aged 22) | (Colombia) Envigado F.C. | |
| 27 | Kendall Burks | (United States) | D | October 8, 1999 (aged 23) | (United States) Washington Huskies | |
| 36 | Andre Reynolds II | (United States) | D | May 2, 2001 (aged 21) | (United States) Chicago Fire Academy | Homegrown |
Midfielders
| 10 | Xherdan Shaqiri | (Switzerland) | M | October 10, 1991 (aged 30) | (France) Olympique Lyonnais | Designated Player; International |
| 21 | Fabian Herbers | (Germany) | M | August 17, 1993 (aged 29) | (United States) Philadelphia Union | |
| 30 | Gastón Giménez | (Paraguay) | M | July 27, 1991 (aged 31) | (Argentina) Vélez Sarsfield | Designated Player |
| 31 | Federico Navarro | (Argentina) | M | March 9, 2000 (aged 22) | (Argentina) Talleres de Cordoba | International; U-22 Initiative |
| 35 | Sergio Oregel | (United States) | M | May 16, 2005 (aged 17) | (United States) Chicago Fire Academy | Homegrown |
| 37 | Javier Casas | (United States) | M | May 14, 2003 (aged 19) | (United States) Chicago Fire Academy | Homegrown |
| 38 | Alex Monis | (United States) | M | March 20, 2003 (aged 19) | (United States) Chicago Fire Academy | Homegrown |
| 39 | Allan Rodriguez | (United States) | M | May 27, 2004 (aged 18) | (United States) Chicago Fire Academy | Homegrown |
| 40 | Brian Gutiérrez | (United States) | M | June 17, 2003 (aged 19) | (United States) Chicago Fire Academy | Homegrown |
Forwards
| 7 | Jairo Torres | (Mexico) | F | July 5, 2000 (aged 22) | (Mexico) Atlas F.C. | International; Young DP |
| 8 | Chris Mueller | (United States) | F | August 29, 1996 (aged 26) | (Scotland) Hibernian F.C. | |
| 11 | Kacper Przybyłko | (Poland) | F | March 25, 1993 (aged 29) | (United States) Philadelphia Union | |
| 26 | Jhon Durán | (Colombia) | F | December 15, 2003 (aged 18) | (Colombia) Envigado F.C. | International; U-22 Initiative |
| 32 | Missael Rodriguez | (United States) | F | February 9, 2003 (aged 19) | (United States) Chicago Fire Academy | Homegrown |
| 33 | Victor Bezerra | (United States) | F | February 5, 2000 (aged 22) | (United States) Indiana Hoosiers | Homegrown |
| 99 | Stanislav Ivanov | (Bulgaria) | F | April 16, 1999 (aged 23) | (Bulgaria) PFC Levski Sofia | |

== Player movement ==
=== Returning, options, and new contracts ===
| Date | Player | Position | Notes | Ref |
|---|---|---|---|---|
| November 29, 2021 | (United States) Jonathan Bornstein | D | Georg Heitz and Ezra Hendrickson confirmed Bornstein would be returning during a press conference; it was later announced that he'd signed a one-year deal | |
| December 3, 2021 | (United States) Wyatt Omsberg | D | Re-signed with the Fire on a contract for 2022 with options for 2023 and 2024 | |
| December 6, 2021 | (Venezuela) Miguel Navarro | D | Signed a new contract that runs through 2024 with an option for 2025 | |
| December 13, 2021 | (Paraguay) Gastón Giménez | M | Re-signed as a Designated Player through 2023 | |
| April 19, 2022 | (United States) Gabriel Slonina | GK | 2023 option was exercised | |
| May 16, 2022 | (United States) Chris Brady | GK | Signed a contract through 2026 with an option for 2027 | |
| September 20, 2022 | (United States) Brian Gutiérrez | MF | Signed to a contract through 2026 with an option for 2027 | |
| September 27, 2022 | (Argentina) Federico Navarro | MF | Signed to a new U-22 contract through 2027 with an option for 2028 | |
| October 7, 2022 | (Paraguay) Gastón Giménez | M | Signed to a new TAM deal through 2025 | |

=== In ===
| Date | Player | Position | Previous club | Notes | Ref |
|---|---|---|---|---|---|
| January 11, 2021 | (Colombia) Jhon Durán | F | (Colombia) Envigado F.C. | Signed as a U-22 Initiative Player to a contract starting in 2022 until 2024 with options for 2025 and 2026 | |
| October 12, 2021 | (United States) Missael Rodriguez | F | (United States) Chicago Fire Academy | Signed as a homegrown player to contract through 2025 with an option for 2026 | |
| October 23, 2021 | (United States) Sergio Oregel | M | (United States) Chicago Fire Academy | Signed as a homegrown player to a contract through 2025 with an option for 2026 | |
| December 20, 2021 | (United States) Spencer Richey | G | (United States) Seattle Sounders FC | Signed as a free agent to a contract through 2023 with an option for 2024 | |
| December 22, 2021 | (United States) Victor Bezerra | F | (United States) Indiana Hoosiers | Signed to a homegrown contract through 2024 with an option for 2025 | |
| January 2, 2021 | (Germany) Rafael Czichos | D | (Germany) 1. FC Köln | Acquired from 1. FC Köln on a contract through 2024 | |
| January 22, 2021 | (Poland) Kacper Przybyłko | F | (United States) Philadelphia Union | Acquired from Philadelphia in exchange for $1,150,000 in GAM spread out over 2022 and 2023, under contract through 2023 | |
| February 9, 2022 | (Switzerland) Xherdan Shaqiri | M | (France) Olympique Lyonnais | Acquired from Lyon for an undisclosed fee- though it was the highest in the team's history- on a Designated Player contract through 2024. | |
| February 19, 2022 | (Mexico) Jairo Torres | F | (Mexico) Atlas F.C. | Acquired from Atlas for an undisclosed fee as a young Designated Player on a contract through 2025 | |
| February 25, 2022 | (United States) Kendall Burks | D | (United States) Washington Huskies | Signed a contract through 2023 with options for 2024 and 2025 after being drafted eleventh overall in the 2022 MLS SuperDraft | |
| May 5, 2022 | (United States) Chris Mueller | F | (Scotland) Hibernian F.C. | Acquired from Hibernian for free on a contract through 2025 with an option for 2026; the Fire acquired Mueller's rights from Orlando City in exchange for $250k GAM in 2022 and 2023, the Fire's first round draft pick in the 2023 superdraft, and the rights to an unnamed player, while also retaining a percentage of any future sale with Mueller | |

=== Loaned in ===
| Date | Player | Position | Loaning Club | Notes | Ref |
|---|---|---|---|---|---|
| August, 2022 | (United States) Gabriel Slonina | G | (England) Chelsea F.C. | Loaned back to the Fire for the remainder of the season after being sold for a club record fee. | |

=== Out ===
| Date | Player | Position | Destination Club | Notes | Ref |
|---|---|---|---|---|---|
| November 8, 2021 | (Slovenia) Robert Berić | F | (China) Tianjin Jinmen Tiger F.C. | Option Declined; was drafted by Sporting Kansas City in the Re-Entry Draft, but has not signed with the club | |
| November 8, 2021 | (Costa Rica) Francisco Calvo | D | (United States) San Jose Earthquakes | Option Declined | |
| November 8, 2021 | (New Zealand) Elliot Collier | F | (United States) San Antonio FC | Option Declined | |
| November 8, 2021 | (Netherlands) Johan Kappelhof | D | (United States) Real Salt Lake | Out of Contract | |
| November 8, 2021 | (United States) Kenneth Kronholm | G | Retired | Option Declined | |
| November 8, 2021 | (Spain) Álvaro Medrán | M | (Saudi Arabia) Al Taawoun FC | Option Declined | |
| November 8, 2021 | (United States) Bobby Shuttleworth | G | (United States) Atlanta United FC | Out of Contract | |
| November 8, 2021 | (United States) Nicholas Slonina | D | Retired | Option Declined after stepping away from the game earlier in the 2021 season | |
| November 8, 2021 | (Serbia) Luka Stojanović | M | (Saudi Arabia) Al-Hazem F.C. | Option Declined | |
| December 13, 2021 | (Argentina) Ignacio Aliseda | F | (Switzerland) FC Lugano | Transferred to FC Lugano | |
| August 2, 2022 | (United States) Gabriel Slonina | G | (England) Chelsea F.C. | Sold for a club record fee- reportedly $10 million, with up to $5 million in add-ons. Loaned back to the Fire for the remainder of the season. | |
| August 5, 2022 | (Nigeria) Chinonso Offor | F | (Canada) CF Montreal | Sold to Montreal for $325k in 2023 GAM | |

=== Second team movement ===
| Player | Position | Movement | Notes | Ref |
|---|---|---|---|---|
| (United States) Allan Rodriguez | M | To second team | Was delisted from the senior roster and added to the second team's roster at an unknown time, with his bio page reflecting him as a Fire II player; he was later added back to the Fire's senior roster page prior to Fire II's final match on September 19 | |
| (Serbia) Mihajlo Mišković | GK | To first team temporarily | Signed a short-term contract with the Fire for the May 28th game against Toronto FC | |

=== Unsigned draft picks and trialists ===
| Pick | Player | Position | Previous club | Notes | Ref |
|---|---|---|---|---|---|
| Draft R2, P33 | (United States) Charlie Ostrem | D | Washington Huskies | Signed with Chicago Fire FC II | |
| Draft R3, P63 | (United States) Carlo Ritaccio | D | Akron Zips | Signed with Chicago Fire FC II | |
| Draft R3, P85 | (France) Yanis Leerman | D | UCF Knights | | |
| Trialist | (Jamaica) Jahmali Waite | G | UConn Huskies | Signed with Pittsburgh Riverhounds | |
| Trialist | (El Salvador) Alexis Cerritos | F | Rio Grande Valley FC | Signed with Central Valley Fuego FC | |
| Trialist | (Portugal) Diogo Pacheco | F | Akron Zips | Signed with Minnesota United FC 2 | |
| Trialist | (El Salvador) Harold Osorio | M | (El Salvador) Alianza F.C. | Trialed with the club from July 4–10, signed with Chicago Fire FC II | |
| Trialist | (Honduras) Aaron Zúñiga | D | (Honduras) Real España | Trialing with the club from about August 10-August 17 | |

== Technical staff ==
| Position | Staff |
|---|---|
| Sporting Director | (Switzerland) Georg Heitz |
| Technical Director | (Germany) Sebastian Pelzer |
| Head Coach | (Saint Vincent and the Grenadines) Ezra Hendrickson |
| Assistant Coach | (United States) C. J. Brown |
| Assistant Coach | (United States) Junior Gonzalez |
| Assistant Coach | (United States) Frank Klopas |
| Goalkeeping Coach | (United States) Adin Brown |

Last updated: December 20, 2021
Source: Chicago Fire Technical Staff

== Competitions ==
=== Major League Soccer ===
==== Eastern Conference table ====
| Pos | Team | Pld | W | L | T | GF | GA | GD | Pts | Qualification |
|---|---|---|---|---|---|---|---|---|---|---|
| 1 | Philadelphia Union | 34 | 19 | 5 | 10 | 72 | 26 | +46 | 67 | Qualification for the conference semifinals and the CONCACAF Champions League |
| 2 | CF Montréal (Note: Canadian clubs could not qualify for the 2023 CONCACAF Champions League through the MLS regular season or playoffs.) | 34 | 20 | 9 | 5 | 63 | 50 | +13 | 65 | Qualification for the first round |
| 3 | New York City FC | 34 | 16 | 11 | 7 | 57 | 41 | +16 | 55 | Qualification for the first round |
| 4 | New York Red Bulls | 34 | 15 | 11 | 8 | 50 | 41 | +9 | 53 | Qualification for the first round |
| 5 | FC Cincinnati | 34 | 12 | 9 | 13 | 64 | 56 | +8 | 49 | Qualification for the first round |
| 6 | Inter Miami CF | 34 | 14 | 14 | 6 | 47 | 56 | −9 | 48 | Qualification for the first round |
| 7 | Orlando City SC | 34 | 14 | 14 | 6 | 44 | 53 | −9 | 48 | Qualification for the first round and the CONCACAF Champions League (Note: as 2022 U.S. Open Cup champions) |
| 8 | Columbus Crew | 34 | 10 | 8 | 16 | 46 | 41 | +5 | 46 | |
| 9 | Charlotte FC | 34 | 13 | 18 | 3 | 44 | 52 | −8 | 42 | |
| 10 | New England Revolution | 34 | 10 | 12 | 12 | 47 | 50 | −3 | 42 | |
| 11 | Atlanta United FC | 34 | 10 | 14 | 10 | 48 | 54 | −6 | 40 | |
| 12 | Chicago Fire FC | 34 | 10 | 15 | 9 | 39 | 48 | −9 | 39 | |
| 13 | Toronto FC | 34 | 9 | 18 | 7 | 49 | 66 | −17 | 34 | |
| 14 | D.C. United | 34 | 7 | 21 | 6 | 36 | 71 | −35 | 27 | |

Source: MLS
Rules for classification: 1) points; 2) total wins; 3) total goal differential; 4) total goals scored; 5) fewer disciplinary points; 6) away goal differential; 7) away goals scored; 8) home goals differential; 9) home goals scored; 10) coin toss (2 clubs tied) or drawing of lots (≥3 clubs tied)

==== Overall table ====
| Pos | Team | Pld | W | L | T | GF | GA | GD | Pts | |
|---|---|---|---|---|---|---|---|---|---|---|
| 1 | Los Angeles FC (C, S) | 34 | 21 | 9 | 4 | 66 | 38 | +28 | 67 | Qualification for the CONCACAF Champions League (Note: As MLS Cup 2022 champions and 2022 MLS Supporters' Shield champions (USA1)) |
| 2 | Philadelphia Union | 34 | 19 | 5 | 10 | 72 | 26 | +46 | 67 | Qualification for the CONCACAF Champions League (Note: As 2022 Eastern Conference regular season champions (USA2)) |
| 3 | CF Montréal (Note: Canadian clubs could not qualify for the 2023 CONCACAF Champions League through the MLS regular season or playoffs.) | 34 | 20 | 9 | 5 | 63 | 50 | +13 | 65 | |
| 4 | Austin FC | 34 | 16 | 10 | 8 | 65 | 49 | +16 | 56 | Qualification for the CONCACAF Champions League (Note: As highest-ranked U.S. based Division I club (based on 2022 MLS regular season record) not already qualified (USA3)) |
| 5 | New York City FC | 34 | 16 | 11 | 7 | 57 | 41 | +16 | 55 | |
| 6 | New York Red Bulls | 34 | 15 | 11 | 8 | 50 | 41 | +9 | 53 | |
| 7 | FC Dallas | 34 | 14 | 9 | 11 | 48 | 37 | +11 | 53 | |
| 8 | LA Galaxy | 34 | 14 | 12 | 8 | 58 | 51 | +7 | 50 | |
| 9 | Nashville SC | 34 | 13 | 10 | 11 | 52 | 41 | +11 | 50 | |
| 10 | FC Cincinnati | 34 | 12 | 9 | 13 | 64 | 56 | +8 | 49 | |
| 11 | Minnesota United FC | 34 | 14 | 14 | 6 | 48 | 51 | −3 | 48 | |
| 12 | Inter Miami CF | 34 | 14 | 14 | 6 | 47 | 56 | −9 | 48 | |
| 13 | Orlando City SC (U) | 34 | 14 | 14 | 6 | 44 | 53 | −9 | 48 | Qualification for the CONCACAF Champions League (Note: As 2022 U.S. Open Cup champions (USA4)) |
| 14 | Real Salt Lake | 34 | 12 | 11 | 11 | 43 | 45 | −2 | 47 | |
| 15 | Portland Timbers | 34 | 11 | 10 | 13 | 53 | 53 | 0 | 46 | |
| 16 | Columbus Crew | 34 | 10 | 8 | 16 | 46 | 41 | +5 | 46 | |
| 17 | Vancouver Whitecaps FC (V) | 34 | 12 | 15 | 7 | 40 | 57 | −17 | 43 | Qualification for the CONCACAF Champions League (Note: As 2022 Canadian Championship winners (CAN1)) |
| 18 | Colorado Rapids | 34 | 11 | 13 | 10 | 46 | 57 | −11 | 43 | |
| 19 | Charlotte FC | 34 | 13 | 18 | 3 | 44 | 52 | −8 | 42 | |
| 20 | New England Revolution | 34 | 10 | 12 | 12 | 47 | 50 | −3 | 42 | |
| 21 | Seattle Sounders FC | 34 | 12 | 17 | 5 | 47 | 46 | +1 | 41 | |
| 22 | Sporting Kansas City | 34 | 11 | 16 | 7 | 42 | 54 | −12 | 40 | |
| 23 | Atlanta United FC | 34 | 10 | 14 | 10 | 48 | 54 | −6 | 40 | |
| 24 | Chicago Fire FC | 34 | 10 | 15 | 9 | 39 | 48 | −9 | 39 | |
| 25 | Houston Dynamo FC | 34 | 10 | 18 | 6 | 43 | 56 | −13 | 36 | |
| 26 | San Jose Earthquakes | 34 | 8 | 15 | 11 | 52 | 69 | −17 | 35 | |
| 27 | Toronto FC | 34 | 9 | 18 | 7 | 49 | 66 | −17 | 34 | |
| 28 | D.C. United | 34 | 7 | 21 | 6 | 36 | 71 | −35 | 27 | |

Source: MLS
Rules for classification: 1) points; 2) total wins; 3) total goal differential; 4) total goals scored; 5) fewer disciplinary points; 6) away goal differential; 7) away goals scored; 8) home goals differential; 9) home goals scored; 10) coin toss (2 clubs tied) or drawing of lots (≥3 clubs tied)
(C) Champions; (S) Supporters' Shield winners; (U) U.S. Open Cup winners; (V) Canadian Championship winners

==== Results summary ====
| Overall | | | | | | | | Home | | | | | | Away | | | | | |
| Pld | Pts | W | L | T | GF | GA | GD | W | L | T | GF | GA | GD | W | L | T | GF | GA | GD |
|---|---|---|---|---|---|---|---|---|---|---|---|---|---|---|---|---|---|---|---|
| 34 | 39 | 10 | 15 | 9 | 39 | 48 | −9 | 6 | 6 | 5 | 18 | 17 | +1 | 4 | 9 | 4 | 21 | 31 | −10 |

Last updated: October 9
Source: MLSsoccer.com standings
Pld = Matches played; Pts = Points; W = Matches won; T = Matches tied; L = Matches lost; GF = Goals for; GA = Goals against; GD = Goal difference

==== Match results ====
===== Preseason =====
| January 29 Preseason 1 | Minnesota United FC | 0–0 | Chicago Fire FC | Davenport, Florida |
| 2:00pm CDT | | Report | | Stadium: Omni Resort at ChampionsGate |

| February 12 Preseason 2 | Toronto FC | 1–0 | Chicago Fire FC | Austin, Texas |
| 2:00pm CDT | 55' Jiménez | CHI Report; TOR Report | | Stadium: St. David's Performance Center |

| February 16 Preseason 3 | FC Dallas | 0–0 | Chicago Fire FC | Austin, Texas |
| 1:00pm CDT | | CHI Report; FCD Report | | Stadium: St. David's Performance Center |

| February 19 Preseason 4 | Austin FC | 0–1 | Chicago Fire FC | Austin, Texas |
| 2:00pm CDT | | Report | 6' Giménez | Stadium: St. David's Performance Center |

===== Regular season =====
| February 26 1 | Inter Miami CF | 0–0 | Chicago Fire FC | Ft. Lauderdale, Florida |
| 17:00 CST | (yellow card) 53' Yedlin | Report | (yellow card) 87' Durán | Stadium: DRV PNK Stadium; Attendance: 15,973; Referee: Lukasz Szpala |

| March 5 2 | Chicago Fire FC | 0–0 | Orlando City SC | Chicago, Illinois |
| 17:00 CST | (yellow card) 12' Herbers; (yellow card) 63' M. Navarro; (yellow card) 79' Durán; (yellow card) 81' Sekulić; (yellow card) 90+3' Giménez | Report | (yellow card) 90' Araújo; (yellow card) 90+3' Pedro Gallese | Stadium: Soldier Field; Attendance: 25,477; Referee: Ismir Pekmic |

| March 12 3 | D.C. United | 0–2 | Chicago Fire FC | Washington, DC |
| 6:30 PM CST | (yellow card) 21' Najar; (yellow card) 45' Skundrich; (yellow card) 65' Hines-Ike | Report | 32' Ivanov; (yellow card) 45' Giménez; 80' Bornstein; (yellow card) 86' F. Navarro | Stadium: Audi Field; Attendance: 13,795; Referee: Rubiel Vazquez |

| March 19 4 | Chicago Fire FC | 3–1 | Sporting Kansas City | Chicago, Illinois |
| 5:00 PM CST | Przybyłko 30' 82'; Herbers (yellow card) 37'; Shaqiri 50' (pen.) (yellow card) 74' | Report | Fontàs (yellow card) 35'; Zusi (yellow card) 53'; Espinoza 56' | Stadium: Soldier Field; Attendance: 9,352; Referee: Timothy Ford |

| April 2 5 | Chicago Fire FC | 0–0 | FC Dallas | Chicago, Illinois |
| 2:30 PM CST | Omsberg (yellow card) 38'; Espinoza (yellow card) 62'; Przybyłko (yellow card) 69'; Casas (yellow card) 89' | Report | Quignón (yellow card) 17'; Farfan (yellow card) 47' | Stadium: Soldier Field; Attendance: 11,411; Referee: Pierre Lauziere |

| April 9 6 | Orlando City SC | 1–0 | Chicago Fire FC | Orlando, Florida |
| 12:00 PM CST | 59' Kara; (yellow card) 81' Jansson; (yellow card) 85' Méndez | | (yellow card) 5, 43' (yellow-red card) Gutiérrez; (yellow card) 54' Espinoza | Stadium: Exploria Stadium; Attendance: 16,051; Referee: Victor Rivas |

| April 16 7 | Chicago Fire FC | 0–0 | LA Galaxy | Chicago, Illinois |
| 7:00 PM CST | Czichos (yellow card) 24'; Pineda (yellow card) 44'; Giménez (yellow card) 49'; M. Navarro (yellow card) 69' | Report | Williams (yellow card) 38'; Coulibaly (yellow card) 76' | Stadium: Soldier Field; Attendance: 30,282; Referee: Ted Unkel |

| April 23 8 | Minnesota United FC | 3–0 | Chicago Fire FC | St. Paul, Minnesota |
| 4:00 PM CST | Trapp (yellow card) 36'; Reynoso 72'; Arriaga 84'; Lod 88' | Report | M. Navarro (yellow card) 35'; Giménez (yellow card) 41'; F. Navarro (yellow card) 52' (yellow-red card) 77' | Stadium: Allianz Field; Referee: Silviu Petrescu |

| April 30 9 | Chicago Fire FC | 1–2 | New York Red Bulls | Chicago, Illinois |
| 7:00 PM CDT | 17' (pen.) Shaqiri; (yellow card) 37' (yellow-red card) 83' Czichos; (yellow card) 45+1' M. Navarro; (yellow card) 72' (yellow-red card) 80' Durán | Report | (yellow card) 15' Fletcher; (yellow card) 27' Tolkin; (yellow card) 65', (goal) 75', 90+1' (pen.) Klimala | Stadium: Soldier Field; Attendance: 11,108; Referee: Jon Freemon |
Note: Near the end of the first half of the match at stoppage time (45' +3'), the match was haunted due to inclement weather. Play was later resumed at 9:22 PM CDT starting with the competition on the first-half stoppage time followed by three minute of half time before going into the second half.

| May 7 10 | Atlanta United FC | 4–1 | Chicago Fire FC | Atlanta, Georgia |
| 5:00 PM CST | Cisneros 3', 27', 36'; Araújo (yellow card) 45+4'; Lennon 90+1' | Report | Offor 11', (yellow card) 36'; M. Navarro (yellow card) 30'; Mueller (yellow card) 72' | Stadium: Mercedes-Benz Stadium; Attendance: 42,547; Referee: Ramy Touchan |

| May 14 11 | Chicago Fire FC | 1–2 | FC Cincinnati | Chicago, Illinois |
| 7:00 PM CST | 83' Durán | Report | (yellow card) 8' Moreno; (yellow card) 21' Acosta; 33' (o.g.) Rafael Czichos; 85' Acosta | Stadium: Soldier Field; Attendance: 14,049; Referee: Tori Penso |

| May 18 12 | New York Red Bulls | 3–3 | Chicago Fire FC | Harrison, New Jersey |
| 6:30 PM CST | (yellow card) 1' Terán; (yellow card) 19' Espinoza; 38' Mueller; 49', (yellow card) 85' Omsberg; (yellow card) 70' M. Navarro; 89' Shaqiri | Report | 20' (pen.) Morgan; (yellow card) 26', (goal) 58' Harper; (yellow card) 63' Edwards; (yellow card) 66' S. Nealis; 90+1' Klimala | Stadium: Red Bull Arena; Attendance: 13,257; Referee: Ted Unkel |

| May 22 13 | New York City FC | 1–0 | Chicago Fire FC | New York, New York |
| 4:00 PM CST | 23' (pen.) Héber; (yellow card) 46' Acevedo; (yellow card) 89' Martins; (yellow card) 90+4' Parks | Report | (yellow card) 63' Sekulic | Stadium: Citi Field; Attendance: 18,823; Referee: Fotis Bazakos |

| May 28 14 | Toronto FC | 3–2 | Chicago Fire FC | Toronto, Canada |
| 6:00 PM CST | 13' Kerr; (yellow card) 31', (goal) 71' (pen.), 78'; (yellow card) 87' Westberg; (yellow card) 88' Priso | Report | 52', (yellow card) 78' Terán; (yellow card) 62', (goal) 66' Przybyłko; (yellow card) 75' Shaqiri | Stadium: BMO Field; Attendance: 25,906; Referee: Guido Gonzalez, Jr. |

| June 18 15 | Chicago Fire FC | 1–0 | D.C. United | Chicago, Illinois |
| 7:00 PM CST | F. Navarro (yellow card) 30'; Herbers 78', (yellow card) 87' | Report | Pines (yellow card) 33'; Najar (yellow card) 72' | Stadium: Soldier Field; Attendance: 17,650; Referee: Nima Saghafi |

| June 25 16 | Houston Dynamo FC | 2–0 | Chicago Fire FC | Houston, Texas |
| 7:00 PM CST | Úlfarsson 23'; Rodríguez (yellow card) 41'; Quintero 45+2'; Steres (yellow card) 64'; Cerén (yellow card) 79'; Parker (yellow card) 90+2' | Report | Navarro (yellow card) 38'; Espinoza (yellow card) 81' | Stadium: PNC Stadium; Attendance: 13,081; Referee: Ismir Pekmic |

| June 29 17 | Chicago Fire FC | 1–0 | Philadelphia Union | Chicago, Illinois |
| 6:00 PM CST | (yellow card) 51' Terán | Report | (yellow card) 29' (yellow-red card) 72' Martínez; (yellow card) 35' Bedoya; (yellow card) 77' Wagner; (yellow card) 83' Gazdag | Stadium: Soldier Field; Attendance: 10,384; Referee: Michael Radchuk |

| July 3 18 | San Jose Earthquakes | 2–1 | Chicago Fire FC | San Jose, California |
| 8:00 PM CST | 47', 87', (yellow card) 73' Kikanovic; (yellow card) 63' Marie; (yellow card) 75' López | Report | (yellow card) 27' Mueller; (yellow card) 43' Giménez; 90+5' Gutiérrez | Stadium: PayPal Park; Attendance: 13,224; Referee: Victor Rivas |

| July 9 19 | Chicago Fire FC | 2–3 | Columbus Crew SC | Chicago, Illinois |
| 7:00 PM CST | (yellow card) 14' Giménez; 29', (yellow card) 43' Czichos; 41' Mueller; (yellow card) 50', (red card) 90' M. Navarro; (yellow card) 54' Gutiérrez; (yellow card) 60' Durán | Report | (yellow card) 8' Moreira; 63', 75' Etienne; (yellow card) 71' Mensah; 83', (yellow card) 84' Hernández | Stadium: Soldier Field; Attendance: 15,157; Referee: Ramy Touchan |

| July 13 20 | Chicago Fire FC | 2–0 | Toronto FC | Chicago, Illinois |
| 7:00 PM CST | 4', 16' Durán; (yellow card) 45+1' Mueller; (yellow card) 64' Gutiérrez | Report | (yellow card) 34' O'Neill; (yellow card) 37' MacNaughton; (yellow card) 65' Criscito; (yellow card) 90+4' Nelson | Stadium: Soldier Field; Attendance: 10,450; Referee: Lukasz Szpala |

| July 16 21 | Chicago Fire FC | 1–0 | Seattle Sounders FC | Chicago, Illinois |
| 7:00 PM CST | 23' Rafael Czichos | Report | (yellow card) 25' Kelyn Rowe | Stadium: Soldier Field; Attendance: 13,601; Referee: Pierre-Luc Lauziere |

| July 23 22 | Vancouver Whitecaps FC | 1–3 | Chicago Fire FC | Vancouver, Canada |
| 9:00 PM CST | Cavallini 54'; Dájome (yellow card) 65'; Jungwirth (yellow card) 82' | Report | Shaqiri 13'; Czichos 76'; Mueller 90' | Stadium: BC Place; Attendance: 14,984; Referee: Joseph Dickerson |

| July 30 23 | Chicago Fire FC | 0–0 | Atlanta United FC | Chicago, Illinois |
| 4:00 PM CST | Durán (yellow card) 41'; Shaqiri (yellow card) 63' | Report | Sosa (yellow card) 81'; Dwyer (yellow card) 90+5' | Stadium: Soldier Field; Attendance: 23,951; Referee: Timothy Ford |

| August 6 24 | Charlotte FC | 2–3 | Chicago Fire FC | Charlotte, North Carolina |
| 6:00 PM CST | 1' Reyna; 45' Świderski; (yellow card) 66' Gaines; (yellow card) 75' Jones | Report | 21', 52', (yellow card) 68' Przybyłko; 24' F. Navarro; (yellow card) 71' Sekulić; (yellow card) 78' Mueller | Stadium: Bank of America Stadium; Attendance: 32,538; Referee: Nima Saghafi |

| August 13 25 | Philadelphia Union | 4–1 | Chicago Fire FC | Chester, Pennsylvania |
| 6:30 PM CST | 16' Gazdag; (yellow card) 28' Bedoya; 37' Elliot; 53', (yellow card) 86' Carranza; 82', (yellow card) 85' Burke; (yellow card) 90+1' Mbaizo | Report | (yellow card) 2' Pineda; 49' Mueller; (yellow card) 70' Xherdan Shaqiri; (yellow card) 82' F. Navarro | Stadium: Subaru Park; Attendance: 18,682; Referee: Ismail Elfath |

| August 21 26 | Chicago Fire FC | 0–2 | New York City FC | Bridgeview, Illinois |
| 5:00 PM CST | Czichos (yellow card) 18'; Terán (yellow card) 60'; M. Navarro (yellow card) 77' | Report | Pereira 16'; Rodríguez 46', (yellow card) 72' | Stadium: SeatGeek Stadium; Attendance: 11,720; Referee: Rosendo Mendoza |

| August 28 27 | Chicago Fire FC | 0–2 | CF Montreal | Chicago, Illinois |
| 5:00 PM CST | (yellow card) 22' Terán; (yellow card) 57' Torres | Report | 19', (yellow card) 34' (yellow-red card) 45+3' Koné; 24' Romell Quioto; (yellow card) 45+6' Victor Wanyama; (yellow card) 59' Djordje Mihailovic; (yellow card) 62' Sebastian Breza | Stadium: Soldier Field; Attendance: 13,907; Referee: Michael Radchuk |

| August 31 28 | New England Revolution | 0–0 | Chicago Fire FC | Foxborough, Massachusetts |
| 6:30 PM CST | (yellow card) 21' Kessler | Report | (yellow card) 29' F. Navarro; (yellow card) 76' Pineda | Stadium: Gillette Stadium; Attendance: 13,325; Referee: Marcos de Oliveira |

| September 3 29 | Columbus Crew SC | 0–0 | Chicago Fire FC | Columbus, Ohio |
| 6:30 PM CST | (yellow card) 74' Díaz | Report | (yellow card) 85' Herbers; (yellow card) 90+7' Espinoza | Stadium: Lower.com Field; Attendance: 18,189; Referee: Ismir Pekmic |

| September 10 30 | Chicago Fire FC | 3–1 | Inter Miami CF | Bridgeview, Illinois |
| 7:00 PM CST | (yellow card) 33' Czichos; 40', 87' Durán; 64' Xherdan Shaqiri; (yellow card) 76' F. Navarro | Report | 77' (pen.) Higuain; (yellow card) 84' Neville (Coach); (yellow card) 90' McVey | Stadium: SeatGeek Stadium; Attendance: 15,104; Referee: Matt Conger |

| September 13 31 | CF Montreal | 3–2 | Chicago Fire FC | Montreal, Canada |
| 6:30 PM CST | 21', 29' Kamara; 44' Brault-Guillard; (yellow card) 57' Waterman; (yellow card) 61' Camacho; (yellow card) 69' Wanyama | Report | (yellow card) 19' Reynolds II; 39', 57' Xherdan Shaqiri; (yellow card) 85' Terán; (yellow card) 88' Czichos | Stadium: Saputo Stadium; Referee: Ted Unkel |

| September 17 32 | Chicago Fire FC | 2–3 | Charlotte FC | Chicago, Illinois |
| 7:00 PM CST | 3' Pineda; 30', (yellow card) 39' Durán; (yellow card) 89' Bezerra | Report | (yellow card) 39' Bronico; (yellow card) 53', (goal) 68', 90+6' Świderski; (yellow card) 54' Jones; 76' Santos; (yellow card) 79' Gaines | Stadium: Soldier Field; Attendance: 21,450; Referee: Tori Penso |

| October 1 33 | FC Cincinnati | 2–3 | Chicago Fire FC | Cincinnati, Ohio |
| 6:30 PM CST | 56', 75' Durán; 59' Gutiérrez; (yellow card) 68' Pineda; (yellow card) 90+4' Rafael Czichos | Report | (yellow card) 27' Hagglund; 78' Acosta; 89' Brandon Vazquez; (red card) 90+5' Santos | Stadium: TQL Stadium; Attendance: 25,316; Referee: Lukasz Szpala |

| October 9 34 | Chicago Fire FC | 1–1 | New England Revolution | Bridgeview, Illinois |
| 2:30 PM CST | (yellow card) 18' Pineda; (yellow card) 44' Mueller; 90+2' Monis | Report | (yellow card) 57' Vrioni; 88' Borrero; (yellow card) 90' Makoun | Stadium: SeatGeek Stadium; Attendance: 14,357; Referee: Michael Radchuk |

=== U.S. Open Cup ===
| April 19 Third Round | Chicago Fire FC (MLS) (Illinois) | 2–2 (4–5 p) | (Nebraska) Union Omaha (USL1) | Chicago, Illinois |
| 7:00 pm CDT | (yellow card) 7' Oregel; (yellow card) 42' Durán; 53' (pen.), 115' (pen.) Czichos; (yellow card) 97' Espinoza; (yellow card) 110' Casas | Report | (yellow card) 55' Ricardo Rivera; (yellow card) 60' Claudio; 68' Meza; (yellow card) 77' Alihodžić; 120+3' Touche | Stadium: Soldier Field; Referee: Calin Radosav |
| | Penalties |
| | (penalty missed) Przybyłko; (penalty scored) Czichos; (penalty scored) Espinoza; (penalty scored) Ivanov; (penalty scored) Bezerra; (penalty missed) M. Navarro | | (penalty scored) Kametani; (penalty scored) Alihodžić; (penalty missed) Meza; (penalty scored) Knutson; (penalty scored) Montesdeoca; (penalty scored) Acoff |

=== International friendlies ===
| September 24 | (United States) Chicago Fire FC | 1–1 (3–1 p) | (Mexico) Club León | Bridgeview, Illinois |
| 17:00 | (yellow card) 16', (goal) 48' Casas; (yellow card) 45' Rodriguez | Report | (yellow card) 17' Montes; 40' Alvarado; (yellow card) 71' Tesillo | Stadium: SeatGeek Stadium; Referee: Calin Radosav |
| | Penalties |
| | (penalty scored) Bornstein; (penalty scored) Ivanov; (penalty scored) Sekulić | | (penalty missed) Tesillo; (penalty missed) Ibarra; (penalty scored) Díaz; (penalty missed) Salazar |

== Statistics ==
Note: italics indicates a player who left during the season

=== Games played ===
| No. | Pos. | Nat. | Name | MLS | | | | Open Cup | | | | Total | | | |
| No. | Pos. | Nat. | Name | Starts | Apps | Minutes | Bench | Starts | Apps | Minutes | Bench | Starts | Apps | Minutes | Bench |
|---|---|---|---|---|---|---|---|---|---|---|---|---|---|---|---|
| 1 | GK | USA | Gabriel Slonina | 32 | 32 | 2880 | | | | | | 32 | 32 | 2880 | |
| 2 | DF | SVK | Boris Sekulić | 32 | 33 | 2822 | 1 | | | | | 32 | 33 | 2822 | 1 |
| 3 | DF | USA | Jonathan Bornstein | 13 | 22 | 1198 | 11 | | | | | 13 | 22 | 1198 | 11 |
| 5 | DF | GER | Rafael Czichos | 26 | 26 | 2332 | | 1 | 1 | 120 | | 27 | 27 | 2452 | |
| 6 | DF | VEN | Miguel Navarro | 24 | 25 | 2171 | 1 | | 1 | 15 | | 24 | 26 | 2186 | 1 |
| 7 | FW | MEX | Jairo Torres | 6 | 14 | 684 | | | | | | 6 | 14 | 684 | |
| 8 | FW | USA | Chris Mueller | 23 | 24 | 1974 | | | | | | 23 | 24 | 1974 | |
| 9 | FW | NGR | Chinonso Offor | 3 | 7 | 268 | 12 | 1 | 1 | 90 | | 4 | 8 | 358 | 12 |
| 10 | MF | SWI | Xherdan Shaqiri | 27 | 29 | 2258 | | | | | | 27 | 29 | 2258 | |
| 11 | FW | POL | Kacper Przybyłko | 18 | 25 | 1606 | 1 | | 1 | 30 | | 18 | 26 | 1636 | 1 |
| 14 | DF | ECU | Jhon Espinoza | 3 | 19 | 478 | 10 | 1 | 1 | 120 | | 4 | 20 | 598 | 10 |
| 18 | GK | USA | Spencer Richey | 1 | 1 | 90 | 27 | 1 | 1 | 120 | | 2 | 2 | 210 | 27 |
| 20 | DF | USA | Wyatt Omsberg | 14 | 14 | 1259 | | | | | | 14 | 14 | 1259 | |
| 21 | MF | GER | Fabian Herbers | 10 | 25 | 1070 | | | | | | 10 | 25 | 1070 | |
| 22 | DF | USA | Mauricio Pineda | 23 | 27 | 2002 | 2 | | | | | 23 | 27 | 2002 | 2 |
| 23 | DF | COL | Carlos Terán | 19 | 22 | 1676 | 5 | | | | | 19 | 22 | 1676 | 5 |
| 26 | FW | COL | Jhon Durán | 14 | 27 | 1363 | 3 | 1 | 1 | 77 | | 15 | 28 | 1440 | 3 |
| 27 | DF | USA | Kendall Burks | 2 | 4 | 182 | 17 | 1 | 1 | 120 | | 3 | 5 | 302 | 17 |
| 30 | MF | PAR | Gastón Giménez | 20 | 22 | 1700 | | | | | | 20 | 22 | 1700 | |
| 31 | MF | ARG | Federico Navarro | 27 | 30 | 2461 | 2 | | 1 | 30 | | 27 | 31 | 2491 | 2 |
| 32 | MF | USA | Missael Rodriguez | | | | 5 | 1 | 1 | 90 | | 1 | 1 | 90 | 5 |
| 33 | FW | USA | Victor Bezerra | | 5 | 43 | 16 | | 1 | 43 | | | 6 | 86 | 16 |
| 34 | GK | USA | Chris Brady | 1 | 1 | 90 | 6 | | | | 1 | 1 | 1 | 90 | 7 |
| 35 | MF | USA | Sergio Oregel | | 1 | 11 | 7 | 1 | 1 | 90 | | 1 | 2 | 101 | 7 |
| 36 | DF | USA | Andre Reynolds II | 4 | 12 | 400 | 10 | 1 | 1 | 105 | | 5 | 13 | 505 | 10 |
| 37 | MF | USA | Javier Casas | | 5 | 34 | 19 | 1 | 1 | 120 | | 1 | 6 | 154 | 19 |
| 38 | FW | USA | Alex Monis | | 1 | 1 | 7 | | | | | | 1 | 1 | 7 |
| 40 | MF | USA | Brian Gutiérrez | 20 | 33 | 1638 | | 1 | 1 | 120 | | 21 | 34 | 1758 | |
| 41 | GK | SER | Mihajlo Mišković | | | | 1 | | | | | | | | 1 |
| 99 | FW | BUL | Stanislav Ivanov | 12 | 15 | 891 | 10 | | 1 | 30 | | 12 | 16 | 921 | 10 |

==== Main starting XI ====
This starting group is based on players who started in the indicated position more than any other player across all competitions.

Detailed Starting Positions

| No. | Nat. | Name | GK | RB | RCB | LCB | LB | RDM | LDM | RW | AM | LW | ST |
|---|---|---|---|---|---|---|---|---|---|---|---|---|---|
| No. | Nat. | Name | 1 | USA | Gabriel Slonina | 32 | | | | | | | |
| 2 | SVK | Boris Sekulić | | 32 | | | | | | | | | |
| 3 | USA | Jonathan Bornstein | | | | 2 | 8 | 1 | | | | 2 | |
| 5 | GER | Rafael Czichos | | | | 27 | | | | | | | |
| 6 | VEN | Miguel Navarro | | | | | 24 | | | | | | |
| 7 | MEX | Jairo Torres | | | | | | 1 | | 4 | | 1 | |
| 8 | USA | Chris Mueller | | | | | | | | 7 | | 16 | |
| 9 | NGR | Chinonso Offor | | | | | | | | 2 | | | 2 |
| 10 | SWI | Xherdan Shaqiri | | | | | | | | | 26 | | |
| 11 | POL | Kacper Przybyłko | | | | | | | | | | | 18 |
| 14 | ECU | Jhon Espinoza | | 3 | | | 1 | | | | | | |
| 18 | USA | Spencer Richey | 2 | | | | | | | | | | |
| 20 | USA | Wyatt Omsberg | | | 12 | 2 | | | | | | | |
| 21 | GER | Fabian Herbers | | | | | | | 2 | 3 | | 5 | |
| 22 | USA | Mauricio Pineda | | | 2 | 3 | | 8 | 10 | | | | |
| 23 | COL | Carlos Terán | | | 20 | | | | | | | | |
| 26 | COL | Jhon Durán | | | | | | | | | | | 15 |
| 27 | USA | Kendall Burks | | | 2 | 1 | | | | | | | |
| 30 | PAR | Gastón Giménez | | | | | | 1 | 18 | | 1 | | |
| 31 | ARG | Federico Navarro | | | | | | 22 | 4 | | | | |
| 32 | USA | Missael Rodriguez | | | | | | | | | | 1 | |
| 33 | USA | Victor Bezerra | | | | | | | | | | | |
| 34 | USA | Chris Brady | 1 | | | | | | | | | | |
| 35 | USA | Sergio Oregel | | | | | | | 1 | | | | |
| 36 | USA | Andre Reynolds II | | | | | 2 | | | 2 | | 1 | |
| 37 | USA | Javier Casas | | | | | | 1 | | | | | |
| 38 | USA | Alex Monis | | | | | | | | | | | |
| 40 | USA | Brian Gutiérrez | | | | | | | | 3 | 7 | 11 | |
| 99 | BUL | Stanislav Ivanov | | | | | | | | 12 | | | |

=== Goalkeeping ===
| No. | Nat. | Name | MLS | | | Open Cup | | | Total | | |
| No. | Nat. | Name | Clean Sheets | Saves | GA | Clean Sheets | Saves | GA | Clean Sheets | Saves | GA |
|---|---|---|---|---|---|---|---|---|---|---|---|
| 1 | USA | Gabriel Slonina | 12 | 82 | 45 | | | | 12 | 82 | 45 |
| 18 | USA | Spencer Richey | | 2 | 2 | | 4 | 2 | | 6 | 4 |
| 34 | USA | Chris Brady | | 4 | 1 | | | | | 4 | 1 |

=== Goals and assists ===
MLS Regular Season
| Rank | Player | Goal | A |
|---|---|---|---|
| 1 | (Colombia) Jhon Durán | 8 | 3 |
| 2 | (Switzerland) Xherdan Shaqiri | 7 | 11 |
| 3 | (Poland) Kacper Przybyłko | 5 | 1 |
| 4 | (United States) Chris Mueller | 4 | 5 |
| 5 | (Germany) Rafael Czichos | 3 | 1 |
| 6 | (United States) Brian Gutiérrez | 2 | 7 |
| 7 | (Argentina) Federico Navarro | 2 | 3 |
| 8 | (Germany) Fabian Herbers | 1 | 1 |
| 8 | (United States) Mauricio Pineda | 1 | 1 |
| 10 | (United States) Jonathan Bornstein | 1 | |
| 10 | (Bulgaria) Stanislav Ivanov | 1 | |
| 10 | (United States) Alex Monis | 1 | |
| 10 | (Nigeria) Chinonso Offor | 1 | |
| 10 | (United States) Wyatt Omsberg | 1 | |
| 10 | (Colombia) Carlos Terán | 1 | |
| 16 | (Slovakia) Boris Sekulić | | 3 |
| 17 | (Paraguay) Gastón Giménez | | 2 |
| 18 | (Venezuela) Miguel Navarro | | 1 |
| 18 | (Mexico) Jairo Torres | | 1 |

Open Cup
| Rank | Player | Goal | A |
|---|---|---|---|
| 1 | (Germany) Rafael Czichos | 2 | |

=== Cards ===
MLS Regular Season
| Rank | Player | Yellow card | (yellow card) (yellow-red card) | Red card | Matches Missed |
|---|---|---|---|---|---|
| 1 | (Venezuela) Miguel Navarro | 9 | | 1 | *May 14 vs FC Cincinnati; *July 13 vs Toronto FC; *August 27 vs Montreal |
| 2 | (Germany) Rafael Czichos | 7 | 1 | | *May 7 vs Atlanta United; *October 9 vs New England Revolution |
| 2 | (Argentina) Federico Navarro | 7 | 1 | | *April 30 vs New York Red Bulls; *September 13 vs CF Montreal |
| 4 | (Colombia) Jhon Durán | 6 | 1 | | *May 7 vs Atlanta United |
| 5 | (United States) Brian Gutiérrez | 3 | 1 | | *April 16 vs LA Galaxy |
| 6 | (Paraguay) Gastón Giménez | 6 | | | *July 13 vs Toronto FC |
| 6 | (Colombia) Carlos Terán | 6 | | | *September 17 vs Charlotte |
| 8 | (Germany) Fabian Herbers | 5 | | | |
| 8 | (United States) Chris Mueller | 5 | | | |
| 8 | (United States) Mauricio Pineda | 5 | | | |
| 8 | (Slovakia) Boris Sekulić | 5 | | | |
| 8 | (Switzerland) Xherdan Shaqiri | 5 | | | |
| 13 | (Ecuador) Jhon Espinoza | 3 | | | |
| 13 | (Poland) Kacper Przybyłko | 3 | | | |
| 15 | (United States) Wyatt Omsberg | 2 | | | |
| 16 | (United States) Victor Bezerra | 1 | | | |
| 16 | (United States) Javier Casas | 1 | | | |
| 16 | (Nigeria) Chinonso Offor | 1 | | | |
| 16 | (United States) Andre Reynolds II | 1 | | | |
| 16 | (Mexico) Jairo Torres | 1 | | | |

Open Cup
| Rank | Player | Yellow card | (yellow card) (yellow-red card) | Red card | Matches Missed |
|---|---|---|---|---|---|
| 1 | (United States) Javier Casas | 1 | | | |
| 1 | (Colombia) Jhon Durán | 1 | | | |
| 1 | (Ecuador) Jhon Espinoza | 1 | | | |
| 1 | (United States) Sergio Oregel | 1 | | | |

== Awards ==
=== Man of the Match awards ===
| Game # | Player | Position | Reference |
|---|---|---|---|
| 1 | (Switzerland) Xherdan Shaqiri (1) | MF | |
| 2 | (Germany) Rafael Czichos (1) | DF | |
| 3 | (Bulgaria) Stanislav Ivanov | MF | |
| 4 | (Poland) Kacper Przybyłko (1) | FW | |
| 5 | (Paraguay) Gastón Giménez (1) | MF | |
| 6 | (United States) Wyatt Omsberg | DF | |
| 7 | (Paraguay) Gastón Giménez (2) | MF | |
| 8 | None awarded | | |
| 9 | None awarded | | |
| 10 | None awarded | | |
| 11 | (Switzerland) Xherdan Shaqiri (2) | MF | |
| 12 | (United States) Chris Mueller (1) | MF | |
| 13 | (United States) Gabriel Slonina (1) | GK | |
| 14 | (Switzerland) Xherdan Shaqiri (3) | MF | |
| 15 | (United States) Chris Mueller (2) | MF | |
| 16 | None awarded | | |
| 17 | (Argentina) Federico Navarro (1) | MF | |
| 18 | None awarded | | |
| 19 | (United States) Chris Mueller (3) | MF | |
| 20 | (Colombia) Jhon Durán (1) | FW | |
| 21 | (Germany) Rafael Czichos (2) | DF | |
| 22 | (Switzerland) Xherdan Shaqiri (4) | MF | |
| 23 | (Argentina) Federico Navarro (2) | MF | |
| 24 | (Poland) Kacper Przybyłko (2) | FW | |
| 25 | None awarded | | |
| 26 | None awarded | | |
| 27 | None awarded | | |
| 28 | (Germany) Fabian Herbers | MF | |
| 29 | (United States) Gabriel Slonina (2) | GK | |
| 30 | (Colombia) Jhon Durán (2) | FW | |
| 31 | None awarded | | |
| 32 | None awarded | | |
| 33 | (Colombia) Jhon Durán (3) | FW | |
| 34 | (Colombia) Carlos Terán | DF | |

=== MLS Team of the Week ===
| Week | Player | Position | Report |
|---|---|---|---|
| 1 | (United States) Gabriel Slonina (1) | Bench | |
| 3 | (United States) Wyatt Omsberg | Defender | |
| 3 | (United States) Gabriel Slonina (2) | Bench | |
| 4 | (Poland) Kacper Przybyłko (1) | Bench | |
| 12 | (Switzerland) Xherdan Shaqiri (1) | Midfielder | |
| 15 | (Germany) Fabian Herbers | Bench | |
| 17 | (Colombia) Carlos Terán | Defender | |
| 17 | (Argentina) Federico Navarro | Midfielder | |
| 20 | (Colombia) Jhon Durán (1) | Striker | |
| 21 | (Germany) Rafael Czichos (1) | Defender | |
| 21 | (Saint Vincent and the Grenadines) Ezra Hendrickson | Coach | |
| 22 | (Switzerland) Xherdan Shaqiri (2) | Midfielder | |
| 22 | (Germany) Rafael Czichos (2) | Bench | |
| 24 | (Poland) Kacper Przybyłko (2) | Forward | |
| 24 | (Switzerland) Xherdan Shaqiri (3) | Bench | |
| 29 | (United States) Gabriel Slonina (3) | Bench | |
| 30 | (Colombia) Jhon Durán (2) | Bench | |
| 31 | (Switzerland) Xherdan Shaqiri (4) | Bench | |
| 33 | (United States) Brian Gutiérrez | MF | |
| 33 | (Colombia) Jhon Durán | FW | |

=== MLS Player of the Week ===
| Week | Player | Statistics | Report |
|---|---|---|---|
| 20 | (Colombia) Jhon Durán | 2 goals vs Toronto FC | |

== Second team statistics ==
Note: italics indicates a player who left during the season.

=== Games played ===
| No. | Pos. | Nat. | Name | MLS Next Pro | | | |
| No. | Pos. | Nat. | Name | Starts | Apps | Minutes | Bench |
|---|---|---|---|---|---|---|---|
| 9 | FW | NGA | Chinonso Offor | 3 | 3 | 228 | |
| 14 | DF | ECU | Jhon Espinoza | 4 | 4 | 287 | |
| 23 | DF | COL | Carlos Terán | 2 | 2 | 94 | |
| 26 | FW | COL | Jhon Durán | 2 | 2 | 171 | |
| 27 | DF | USA | Kendall Burks | 10 | 12 | 750 | |
| 32 | MF | USA | Missael Rodriguez | 11 | 20 | 1123 | |
| 33 | FW | USA | Victor Bezerra | 13 | 16 | 938 | |
| 34 | GK | USA | Chris Brady | 12 | 12 | 1080 | |
| 35 | MF | USA | Sergio Oregel | 17 | 17 | 1321 | |
| 36 | DF | USA | Andre Reynolds II | 6 | 6 | 382 | |
| 37 | MF | USA | Javier Casas | 8 | 8 | 550 | |
| 38 | FW | USA | Alex Monis | 14 | 21 | 1085 | |

=== Goalkeeping ===
| No. | Nat. | Name | MLS Next Pro | | |
| No. | Nat. | Name | Clean Sheets | Saves | GA |
|---|---|---|---|---|---|
| 34 | USA | Chris Brady | 5 | 45 | 10 |

=== Goals and assists ===
MLS Next Pro
| Rank | Player | Goal | A |
|---|---|---|---|
| 1 | (United States) Victor Bezerra | 8 | 2 |
| 2 | (United States) Missael Rodriguez | 7 | 0 |
| 3 | (United States) Alex Monis | 4 | |
| 4 | (Nigeria) Chinonso Offor | 2 | |
| 5 | (United States) Javier Casas | 1 | 1 |
| 5 | (United States) Kendall Burks | 1 | 1 |
| 7 | (United States) Sergio Oregel | | 6 |
