= Gabriel Slonina =

American soccer player (born 2004)

Personal information
- Full name: Gabriel Pawel Slonina
- Date of birth: May 15, 2004 (age 22)
- Place of birth: Addison, Illinois, U.S.
- Height: 6 ft 4 in (1.93 m)
- Position: Goalkeeper

Team information
- Current team: Chelsea
- Number: 44

Youth career
- 2013–2020: Chicago Fire

Senior career*
| Years | Team | Apps | (Gls) |
| 2021–2022 | Chicago Fire | 34 | (0) |
| 2022– | Chelsea | 0 | (0) |
| 2022 | → Chicago Fire (loan) | 9 | (0) |
| 2023–2024 | → Eupen (loan) | 33 | (0) |
| 2024–2025 | → Barnsley (loan) | 11 | (0) |

International career^{‡}
| 2019 | United States U15 | 3 | (0) |
| 2019–2020 | United States U16 | 2 | (0) |
| 2019–2020 | United States U17 | 2 | (0) |
| 2021–2023 | United States U20 | 10 | (0) |
| 2025– | United States U23 | 1 | (0) |
| 2023 | United States | 1 | (0) |
- * Club domestic league appearances and goals as of December 1, 2024 ‡ National team caps and goals as of November 18, 2025

Gabriel Pawel "Gaga" Slonina (Polish: Słonina; born May 15, 2004) is an American professional soccer player who plays as a goalkeeper for Premier League club Chelsea.

In 2023, Slonina was the only goalkeeper included on Goal's NXGN list of the 50 best young players.

== Club career ==
=== Chicago Fire ===
Born in Addison, Illinois, Slonina joined the youth academy of Major League Soccer club Chicago Fire in 2013. On March 8, 2019, Slonina signed a professional homegrown player contract with the club. At the age of 14, Slonina became the second youngest signing in Major League Soccer history and the youngest signing ever for the Chicago Fire.

On August 4, 2021, Slonina made his professional debut for the Chicago Fire against New York City FC, becoming the youngest starting goalkeeper in league history at 17 years, 81 days. Slonina made four saves for the Fire as the match ended in a 0–0 draw which made him the youngest goalkeeper to record a clean sheet in Major League Soccer history.

=== Chelsea ===
On August 2, 2022, Slonina signed for Premier League club Chelsea for a transfer fee of $10 million, potentially rising to $11 million with add-ons. However, as part of the transfer, he remained with the Chicago Fire on loan to complete the remainder of the MLS season, before joining Chelsea on January 1, 2023. Slonina made his debut in a Chelsea shirt for the under-21 team in a Professional Development League match versus Wolverhampton Wanderers Development Squad on January 13, 2023.

==== Loan to Eupen ====
On August 10, 2023, Slonina agreed to join Belgian side K.A.S. Eupen on a season-long loan. On October 28, Slonina recorded his first clean sheet for Eupen in a 2–0 win over Sporting Charleroi. Slonina was Eupen's main goalkeeper for the season, which ended in relegation.

==== Loan to Barnsley ====
On August 9, 2024, Slonina joined League One club Barnsley on a season-long loan deal. However, the loan was terminated on January 1, 2025, due to injury.

==== Club World Cup ====
Slonina was a part of the Chelsea squad for the 2025 FIFA Club World Cup, held in the United States. While he did not play in the tournament, he was among those to receive a gold medal when Chelsea won the championship.

== International career ==
Born in the United States, he is of Polish descent and was eligible to represent the United States or Poland internationally.

Slonina has represented the United States at the under-15, under-16, under-17, and under-20 levels. Slonina was called into camp for the United States senior team in December 2021 but did not feature in a match. On January 21, 2022, Slonina was called into a World Cup Qualifying camp with the United States senior team but again did not feature in a match. On May 17, he was called up to the Polish senior team by coach Czesław Michniewicz for their upcoming Nations League fixtures against Wales, Belgium and the Netherlands. Three days later, Slonina rejected the call-up and declared his wish to represent United States on international level. On January 25, 2023, Slonina became the youngest-ever goalkeeper to play for the United States senior team, making several saves in a 2–1 loss to Serbia.

Slonina was the starting goalkeeper for the United States at the 2023 FIFA U-20 World Cup and posted four consecutive clean sheets as the Americans advanced to the quarterfinals. The only two goals Slonina allowed in the tournament, including one deflected past him by a teammate, came in a 2–0 quarterfinal loss to eventual champions Uruguay.

== Career statistics ==
=== Club ===
As of match played December 1, 2024

Appearances and goals by club, season and competition
| Club | Season | League | | | National cup (Note: Includes Belgian Cup) | | League cup (Note: Includes EFL Cup) | | Continental | | Other | | Total | |
| Club | Season | Division | Apps | Goals | Apps | Goals | Apps | Goals | Apps | Goals | Apps | Goals | Apps | Goals |
|---|---|---|---|---|---|---|---|---|---|---|---|---|---|---|
| Chicago Fire | 2021 | MLS | 11 | 0 | — | | — | | — | | — | | 11 | 0 |
| Chicago Fire | 2022 | MLS | 23 | 0 | 0 | 0 | — | | — | | — | | 23 | 0 |
| Chicago Fire | Total | | 34 | 0 | 0 | 0 | — | | — | | 0 | 0 | 34 | 0 |
| Chelsea | 2024–25 | Premier League | 0 | 0 | 0 | 0 | — | | 0 | 0 | 0 | 0 | 0 | 0 |
| Chelsea | 2025–26 | Premier League | 0 | 0 | 0 | 0 | 0 | 0 | 0 | 0 | — | | 0 | 0 |
| Chelsea | Total | | 0 | 0 | 0 | 0 | 0 | 0 | 0 | 0 | 0 | 0 | 0 | 0 |
| Chicago Fire (loan) | 2022 | Major League Soccer | 9 | 0 | — | | — | | — | | — | | 9 | 0 |
| Eupen (loan) | 2023–24 | Belgian Pro League | 33 | 0 | 1 | 0 | — | | — | | — | | 34 | 0 |
| Barnsley (loan) | 2024–25 | League One | 11 | 0 | — | | 3 | 0 | — | | 0 | 0 | 14 | 0 |
| Chelsea U21 | 2025–26 | — | | | — | | — | | — | | 2 (Note: Appearances in EFL Trophy) | 0 | 2 | 0 |
| Career total | | | 87 | 0 | 1 | 0 | 3 | 0 | 0 | 0 | 2 | 0 | 93 | 0 |

=== International ===
As of match played January 25, 2023

Appearances and goals by national team and year
| National team | Year | Apps | Goals |
|---|---|---|---|
| United States | 2023 | 1 | 0 |
| Total | | 1 | 0 |

== Honours ==
Chelsea

- FIFA Club World Cup: 2025

United States

- CONCACAF Nations League: 2023–24
