= Ezra Hendrickson =

Vincentian association football player and head coach (born 1972)

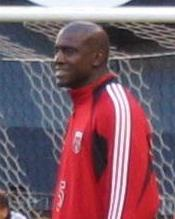
- Hendrickson playing for D.C. United in 2004

Personal information
- Full name: Ezra Hendrickson
- Date of birth: 16 January 1972 (age 54)
- Place of birth: Layou, Saint Vincent and the Grenadines
- Height: 1.91 m (6 ft 3 in)
- Position: Defender

College career
Years	Team	Apps	(Gls)
1990–1993	Drake Bulldogs		

Senior career*
Years	Team	Apps	(Gls)
1994	Des Moines Menace		
1995–1996	New Orleans Riverboat Gamblers	30	(9)
1997	NY/NJ MetroStars	8	(0)
1997–2003	Los Angeles Galaxy	139	(17)
2003	Dallas Burn	16	(1)
2004	Charleston Battery	5	(0)
2004	D.C. United	12	(0)
2005–2006	Chivas USA	31	(3)
2006–2008	Columbus Crew	60	(1)
Total		301	(32)

International career
1995–2008	Saint Vincent and the Grenadines	36	(2)

Managerial career
- 2009–2014: Seattle Sounders FC (assistant)
- 2015–2018: Seattle Sounders FC 2
- 2015–2018: Saint Vincent and the Grenadines (assistant)
- 2018: LA Galaxy (assistant)
- 2019–2021: Columbus Crew (assistant)
- 2022–2023: Chicago Fire
- 2024–2026: Saint Vincent and the Grenadines
- * Club domestic league appearances and goals

Ezra Hendrickson (born 16 January 1972) is a Vincentian professional football coach and former player. He was the head coach of Major League Soccer club Chicago Fire FC from November 24, 2021, until his dismissal on May 8, 2023 and was the manager of the Vincentian national team until 2026

Born in Layou, Hendrickson moved with his family to the United States at a young age and played college soccer with the Drake Bulldogs. A defender, he began his senior career with semi-professional clubs Des Moines Menace and New Orleans Riverboat Gamblers before being drafted in the 1997 MLS Supplemental Draft by the NY/NJ MetroStars. He was cut midseason by the MetroStars before joining the Los Angeles Galaxy. While with the Galaxy, Hendrickson formed part of the defense that would go on to win the Supporters' Shield in 1998 and then both the Shield and MLS Cup in 2002. In 2003, Hendrickson was traded by the Galaxy to the Dallas Burn.

Following the 2003 season, Hendrickson joined A-League club Charleston Battery before quickly moving back to Major League Soccer, joining D.C. United. With D.C. United, Hendrickson won his second MLS Cup but was an unused substitute during the match. He then moved to Chivas USA before joining the Columbus Crew in 2006. Hendrickson ended his playing career in 2008, winning both his third MLS Cup and second Supporters' Shield. He was also capped 36 times for the Saint Vincent and the Grenadines national team, scoring two goals internationally.

In 2009, Hendrickson began his coaching career, joining Major League Soccer expansion club Seattle Sounders FC as an assistant to his former head coach, Sigi Schmid. While an assistant, he would often coach the club's reserve side, finally becoming the first head coach of their professional reserve affiliate, Seattle Sounders FC 2, in 2015. While coaching with Sounders FC 2, Hendrickson was also an assistant with the Vincentian national team. He left both roles in 2018, returning as an assistant to Sigi Schmid with the LA Galaxy. From 2019 to 2021, he joined the Columbus Crew as an assistant to Caleb Porter before being announced as the head coach of the Chicago Fire for the 2022 season.

== Early life ==
Hendrickson was born in Layou, St. Vincent. He played club soccer and varsity basketball at Western High School in Russiaville, Indiana. He then played college soccer at Drake University from 1990 to 1993, where he was named all-Missouri Valley Conference three times, and was named an NSCAA third team All-American as a senior.

Upon graduating, Hendrickson joined the amateur Des Moines Menace in 1994, where he played striker, scoring 13 goals in his first year. After a season with the Menace, Hendrickson was signed to a professional contract by the New Orleans Riverboat Gamblers of the USISL. Hendrickson played for the Riverboat Gamblers, and was named Select League Defender of the Year in 1996.

== Professional career ==
After his exceptional 1996 season, Hendrickson was drafted 5th overall in the 1997 MLS Supplemental Draft by the New York/New Jersey MetroStars, for whom he played eight matches in 1997. During his time with NY/NJ, fans gave him the nickname 'The Caribbean Beckenbauer'. Midseason, Hendrickson was cut and picked up by the Los Angeles Galaxy, where he solidified his role as a starter, and earn a reputation as one of the best wing backs in MLS. After seven seasons with the Galaxy, Hendrickson was traded to the Dallas Burn in 2003.

When the Burn reorganised the team following their 2003 campaign, Hendrickson found himself without a team in MLS, and briefly signed with the Charleston Battery of the A-League. However, not long into the 2004 season, D.C. United acquired him to play a backup role in their central defence. Hendrickson was selected fifth overall by C.D. Chivas USA in the Expansion Draft after the season. After a year with Chivas, he was on a move again, sent to Columbus early in the 2006 season. He retired after helping the Crew to its first MLS title during the 2008 season.

== International ==
Hendrickson also spent time as the captain of the Saint Vincent and the Grenadines national team, and was one of the team's best players since earning his first cap in 1995 against Barbados. He made 24 appearances for Saint Vincent and the Grenadines in the 1998, 2002, and 2006 World Cup qualifiers and 123 overall, scoring twice during a 1996 Caribbean Cup match against Haiti on 27 May 1996.

Scores and results list Saint Vincent and the Grenadines' goal tally first, score column indicates score after each Hendrickson goal.

List of international goals scored by Ezra Hendrickson
No.	Date	Venue	Opponent	Score	Result	Competition	Ref.
1	27 May 1996	Manny Ramjohn Stadium, San Fernando, Trinidad and Tobago	Haiti	1–2	2–2	1996 Caribbean Cup	
2	27 May 1996	Manny Ramjohn Stadium, San Fernando, Trinidad and Tobago	Haiti	2–2	2–2	1996 Caribbean Cup	

== Coaching career ==
After retiring, Hendrickson joined the staff of Seattle Sounders FC, working as an assistant to his former coach, Sigi Schmid. After managing the Sounders reserves for several seasons, he was named head coach for Seattle Sounders FC 2 upon the club's entry into the United Soccer League.

=== Chicago Fire ===
On 24 November 2021, Hendrickson was appointed head coach at Major League Soccer club Chicago Fire from the 2022 season.

On May 8, 2023, with the club in second-to-last place in the Eastern Conference through 10 matches, the Fire announced that Hendrickson had been relieved of his duties, along with assistant coach Junior Gonzalez.

== Coaching statistics ==
As of 29 March 2026

Managerial record by team and tenure
Team	From	To	Record								Ref
Team	From	To	G	W	D	L	GF	GA	GD	Win %	Ref
Chicago Fire	24 November 2021	8 May 2023	46	13	15	18	57	66	−9	28.26	
Saint Vincent and the Grenadines	15 August 2024	Present	20	11	4	5	43	24	+19	55.00	
Total			66	24	19	23	100	90	+10	36.36	—

== Honours ==
=== Player ===
Los Angeles Galaxy

- CONCACAF: Champions Cup 2000
- MLS Cup: 2002
- Supporters' Shield: 1998, 2002

D.C. United

- MLS Cup: 2004

Columbus Crew

- MLS Cup: 2008
- Supporters' Shield: 2008

Individual

- USISL Select League Defender of the Year: 1996
