= Jhon Durán =

Colombian footballer (born 2003)

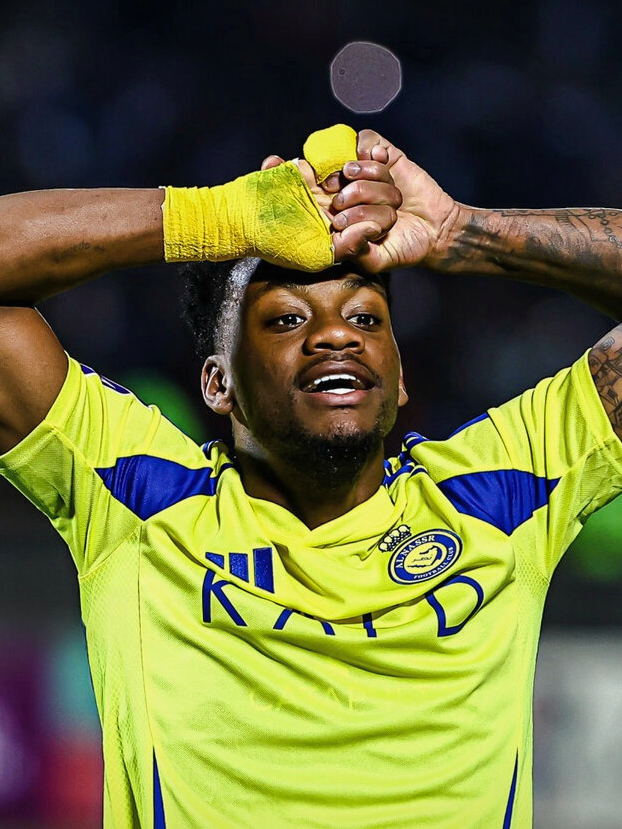
- Durán playing for Al-Nassr in 2025

Personal information
- Full name: Jhon Jader Durán Palacios
- Date of birth: 13 December 2003 (age 22)
- Place of birth: Zaragoza, Antioquia, Colombia
- Height: 1.85 m (6 ft 1 in)
- Position: Striker

Team information
- Current team: Benfica (on loan from Al-Nassr)
- Number: 22

Youth career
- 2015–2019: Envigado

Senior career*
Years	Team	Apps	(Gls)
2019–2021	Envigado	47	(9)
2022	Chicago Fire II	2	(0)
2022–2023	Chicago Fire	27	(8)
2023–2025	Aston Villa	55	(12)
2025–	Al-Nassr	13	(8)
2025–2026	→ Fenerbahçe (loan)	10	(3)
2026	→ Zenit Saint Petersburg (loan)	6	(1)
2026–	→ Benfica (loan)	10	(1)

International career^{‡}
2019	Colombia U17	2	(0)
2022–	Colombia	17	(3)
Medal record
Men's football
Representing Colombia
Copa América
Runner-up	2024 United States
- * Club domestic league appearances and goals as of 8 November 2026 ‡ National team caps and goals as of 6 June 2025

Jhon Jader Durán Palacios (born 13 December 2003) is a Colombian professional footballer who plays as a striker for Primeira Liga club Benfica, on loan from Saudi Pro League club Al-Nassr, and the Colombia national team.

Durán began his career at Envigado, making his professional debut in 2019. His performances earned him a move to Major League Soccer's Chicago Fire in 2022, where he scored 8 goals in 27 appearances. In January 2023, he joined Premier League club Aston Villa for a reported £14.75 million, later transferring to Al-Nassr in January 2025 for £64.2 million. In July 2025, he was loaned to Fenerbahçe for the 2025–26 season. After the cancellation of his Fenerbahçe move, he joined Zenit Saint Petersburg on loan in early 2026.

== Early life ==
Durán was born in Zaragoza, Antioquia, then moved with his family to Aranjuez neighbourhood in Medellín.

== Club career ==
=== Envigado ===
Durán made his professional debut for Envigado on 13 February 2019 against Jaguares de Córdoba in the Copa Colombia, having played for the club at youth level since he was 11 years old. Durán scored his first goal on 1 September, in his third appearance for the club, against Águilas Doradas Rionegro. This made Durán the second-youngest goalscorer in Categoría Primera A, at the age of 15 years and 8 months.

In October 2020, Durán was included in The Guardian's "60 of the best young talents in world football" list.

=== Chicago Fire ===
On 11 January 2021, Chicago Fire announced an agreement to acquire Durán from Envigado on an initial three-year deal, with options in place for a further two years. The contract would begin on 1 January 2022. The transfer fee was reported to be £1.5 million. The signing was sanctioned by Chicago Fire's technical director Sebastian Pelzer, who spotted 17-year old Durán while watching another player at his former club.

Durán made his Chicago Fire debut on 26 February 2022 against Inter Miami. He scored his first goal for the club on 14 May 2022 against FC Cincinnati.

=== Aston Villa ===
==== 2022–2023 season ====
On 16 January 2023, Premier League club Aston Villa announced an agreement to sign Durán: subject to a medical, personal terms and a work visa. Durán left the Colombian camp for the 2023 South American U-20 Championship to fly to England to complete the transfer, which was made official on 23 January. The transfer fee was reported to be an initial £14.75 million, with the potential of a further £3 million in add-ons. On 4 February, Durán made his Premier League debut as a late substitute in a 4–2 defeat to Leicester City.

==== 2023–2024 season ====
On 20 August, Durán scored his first Villa goal as a substitute in a 4–0 win against Everton. On 31 August, Durán scored his first goal in a European competition in a 3–0 UEFA Europa Conference League victory over Scottish club Hibernian. In September, Durán scored a chested half-volley in a league game against Crystal Palace, which went on to be awarded Villa's Goal of the Season at the club's End of Season Awards ceremony. On 13 May 2024, he scored his first (and only) brace at the club by netting late goals in a 3–3 draw against Liverpool following a two-goal deficit, keeping his club's pursuit for a UEFA Champions League berth.

==== 2024–2025 season ====
While being linked with transfers to West Ham United and Chelsea, Durán was not included in Villa's pre-season squad, and caused controversy by emulating West Ham's "hammers" gesture in a livestream. However, on 17 August, Durán scored the winning goal in a 2–1 victory over West Ham, having started as a substitute, celebrating by reinstating his commitment to Villa. He then scored consecutive winning goals as a substitute against Leicester City and Everton, with the latter being a widely lauded long-range effort. On 2 October, he scored his first Champions League goal, securing a 1–0 victory against Bayern Munich by lobbing Manuel Neuer from distance. Five days later, Durán signed a new contract with Villa until 2030. On the same day, his goal against Everton was named BBC Goal of the Month for September. Durán was named Villa's player of the month for September, and his goal against Everton was also awarded the official Premier League Goal of the Month award for that month. On 26 December, Durán was sent off in a league game against Newcastle United, and was subsequently fined and banned for three games.

=== Al-Nassr ===
On 31 January 2025, Durán joined Saudi Pro League club Al-Nassr from Aston Villa for an undisclosed fee, reported to be £64 million plus add-ons. He scored twice in his Saudi Pro League debut on 7 February in a 3–0 home win over Al-Fayha.

==== Loan to Fenerbahçe ====
On 6 July 2025, Durán was loaned to Turkish Süper Lig side Fenerbahçe for the 2025–26 season.

On 6 August 2025, he made his debut with Fenerbahçe in a UEFA Champions League third qualifying round match against Feyenoord as a substitute in 2–1 away loss. On 12 August, he scored his first goal for Fenerbahçe in the second leg against Feyenoord, a 5–2 home victory. On 16 August, he made his Süper Lig debut against Göztepe in a 0–0 away draw.

On 23 October 2025, he returned to the field after a 58-day treatment period following a diagnosis of osteoarthritis, as an 87th-minute substitute in a 1–0 win against VfB Stuttgart in the UEFA Europa League. On 2 November, he scored his first league goal for Fenerbahçe against rivals Beşiktaş in a 3–2 away victory. On 1 December, he scored in another derby, in 1–1 Süper Lig tie in the intercontinental derby against Galatasaray.

==== Loan to Zenit ====
On 9 February 2026, Durán moved on a new loan to Russian Premier League club Zenit St. Petersburg until the end of the 2025–26 season.

==== Loan to Benfica ====
On 20 July 2026, Durán moved on a new loan to Primeira Liga club Benfica until the end of the 2026–27 season. A few weeks later, on 6 August, he scored his first goal for the club in a 6–1 victory over Hearts in the Europa League third qualifying round.

== International career ==
Durán represented the Colombia national under-17 team at the 2019 South American U-17 Championship.

Durán made his senior international debut for Colombia against Guatemala on 24 September 2022, replacing Radamel Falcao as a half-time substitute. On 28 March 2023, he scored his first international goal against Japan, on his first full appearance for the Colombian team.

Despite being named in Colombia's 55-man preliminary squad for the 2026 FIFA World Cup, Durán was left out of the final 26-man squad.

== Career statistics ==
=== Club ===
As of match played 8 November 2026

Appearances and goals by club, season and competition
Club	Season	League			National cup (Note: Includes Copa Colombia, U.S. Open Cup, FA Cup, Turkish Cup, Russian Cup)		League cup (Note: Includes EFL Cup)		Continental		Other		Total	
Club	Season	Division	Apps	Goals	Apps	Goals	Apps	Goals	Apps	Goals	Apps	Goals	Apps	Goals
Envigado	2019	Categoría Primera A	10	1	1	0	—		—		—		11	1
Envigado	2020	Categoría Primera A	13	1	2	0	—		—		—		15	1
Envigado	2021	Categoría Primera A	24	7	1	1	—		—		—		25	8
Envigado	Total		47	9	4	1	—		—		—		51	10
Chicago Fire II	2022	MLS Next Pro	2	0	—		—		—		—		2	0
Chicago Fire	2022	Major League Soccer	27	8	1	0	—		—		—		28	8
Aston Villa	2022–23	Premier League	12	0	—		—		—		—		12	0
Aston Villa	2023–24	Premier League	23	5	1	0	1	0	12 (Note: Appearances in UEFA Europa Conference League)	3	—		37	8
Aston Villa	2024–25	Premier League	20	7	0	0	2	2	7 (Note: Appearances in UEFA Champions League)	3	—		29	12
Aston Villa	Total		55	12	1	0	3	2	19	6	—		78	20
Al-Nassr	2024–25	Saudi Pro League	13	8	—		—		5 (Note: Appearances in AFC Champions League Elite)	4	—		18	12
Fenerbahçe (loan)	2025–26	Süper Lig	10	3	1	0	—		8 (Note: Four appearances and one goal in UEFA Champions League, four appearances in UEFA Europa League)	1	2 (Note: Appearances in Turkish Super Cup)	1	21	5
Zenit Saint Petersburg (loan)	2025–26	Russian Premier League	6	1	3	1	—		—		—		9	2
Benfica (loan)	2026–27	Primeira Liga	10	1	0	0	1	1	8 (Note: Appearances in UEFA Europa League)	3	—		19	5
Career total			170	42	10	2	4	3	40	14	2	1	226	62

=== International ===
As of match played 6 June 2025

Appearances and goals by national team and year
National team	Year	Apps	Goals
Colombia	2022	3	0
Colombia	2023	5	1
Colombia	2024	7	1
Colombia	2025	2	1
Total		17	3

As of match played 25 March 2025
Colombia score listed first, score column indicates score after each Durán goal.

List of international goals scored by Jhon Durán
No.	Date	Venue	Cap	Opponent	Score	Result	Competition	Ref.
1	28 March 2023	Yodoko Sakura Stadium, Osaka, Japan	5	Japan	1–1	2–1	2023 Kirin Challenge Cup	
2	15 October 2024	Estadio Metropolitano Roberto Meléndez, Barranquilla, Colombia	13	Chile	3–0	4–0	2026 FIFA World Cup qualification	
3	25 March 2025	Estadio Metropolitano Roberto Meléndez, Barranquilla, Colombia	16	Paraguay	2–0	2–2	2026 FIFA World Cup qualification	

== Honours ==
Fenerbahçe

- Turkish Super Cup: 2025

Zenit Saint Petersburg

- Russian Premier League: 2025–26

Colombia

- Copa America runner-up: 2024

Individual

- Premier League Goal of the Month: September 2024
- BBC Goal of the Month: September 2024
- Aston Villa Player of the Month: September 2024
