= All-time Orlando City SC (MLS) roster =

This list comprises all players who have played for Orlando City SC which dates from their inaugural Major League Soccer season in 2015 to present. Players who were acquired by the team but were not available to play in matches (e.g. selected in a draft but not signed or acquired in a trade but immediately traded away) are not listed.

A "†" denotes players who did not appear in a single match but were available for fixtures.

A "‡" denotes players who also played for Orlando City in USL Pro before their expansion to MLS.

Bolded players are currently under contract by Orlando City SC.

Stats include all competitive matches (MLS, MLS Cup Playoffs, MLS is Back Tournament, U.S. Open Cup, CONCACAF Champions League, etc.) .

All stats accurate as of match played August 22, 2026.

== Players ==
=== Outfield players ===
Name	D.O.B.	Pos	Nationality	Years	Games	Goals	Debut	Most recent match	Ref
Danilo Acosta	November 17, 1997	DF	Honduras	2019	8	0	March 2, 2019	July 19, 2019	
Raul Aguilera	August 2, 1999	MF	United States	2021	3	0	August 21, 2021	September 19, 2021	
Matheus Aiás	December 30, 1996	FW	Brazil	2020–2022	6	1	October 24, 2020	April 23, 2021	
José Aja	May 10, 1993	DF	Uruguay	2016–2017	15	0	August 14, 2016	September 3, 2017	
Tesho Akindele	March 31, 1992	FW	Canada	2019–2022	121	21	March 2, 2019	October 16, 2022	
R. J. Allen	April 17, 1990	DF	United States	2018	20	0	March 4, 2018	October 14, 2018	
Kevin Alston	May 5, 1988	DF	United States	2016–2017	26	0	April 17, 2016	October 23, 2016	
Alexander Alvarado	April 21, 1999	FW	Ecuador	2020–2022	12	0	October 28, 2020	September 29, 2021	
Mikey Ambrose	October 5, 1993	DF	United States	2016	5	0	August 21, 2016	October 23, 2016	
**Iván Angulo**	March 22, 1999	FW	Colombia	2022–present	166	13	August 6, 2022	August 22, 2026	
César Araújo	April 2, 2001	MF	Uruguay	2022–2025	155	7	February 27, 2022	October 22, 2025	
**Clovis Archange**	July 1, 2008	DF	Canada	2026–present	0	0	N/A	N/A	
Carlos Ascues	June 19, 1992	MF	Peru	2018–2019	28	1	August 25, 2018	September 22, 2019	
Corey Ashe	March 14, 1986	DF	United States	2015	9	0	July 19, 2015	October 17, 2015	
**Eduard Atuesta**	June 18, 1997	MF	Colombia	2025–present	51	0	February 22, 2025	August 22, 2026	
Eric Avila	November 24, 1987	DF	United States	2015	24	1	March 14, 2015	September 14, 2015	
Júlio Baptista	October 1, 1981	FW	Brazil	2016	24	6	April 9, 2016	October 23, 2016	
Giles Barnes	August 5, 1988	FW	Jamaica	2017	35	4	March 5, 2017	October 22, 2017	
Hadji Barry	December 8, 1992	FW	Guinea	2016–2017	14	0	March 6, 2016	June 15, 2017	
Adam Bedell †	December 1, 1991	FW	United States	2015	0	0	N/A	N/A	
Jordan Bender	July 9, 2001	MF	United States	2020–2021	2	0	October 14, 2020	November 8, 2020	
Luke Boden ‡	November 26, 1988	DF	England	2015–2016	49	1	March 28, 2015	October 2, 2016	
**David Brekalo**	December 3, 1998	DF	Slovenia	2024–present	85	5	February 24, 2024	August 22, 2026	
**Gustavo Caraballo**	August 29, 2008	MF	Venezuela	2025–present	6	2	March 1, 2025	May 31, 2025	
Antônio Carlos	March 7, 1993	DF	Brazil	2020–2023	106	4	February 29, 2020	November 25, 2023	
Servando Carrasco	August 13, 1988	MF	United States	2015–2017	62	1	July 26, 2015	October 15, 2017	
**Wilder Cartagena**	September 23, 1994	MF	Peru	2022–present	94	4	August 13, 2022	August 22, 2026	
Tony Cascio †	March 28, 1990	MF	United States	2015	0	0	N/A	N/A	
Darwin Cerén ‡	December 31, 1989	MF	El Salvador	2015–2016	44	2	March 14, 2015	August 1, 2016	
Aurélien Collin	March 8, 1986	DF	France	2015–2016	30	2	March 8, 2015	April 9, 2016	
Josué Colmán	July 25, 1998	MF	Paraguay	2018–2020	35	1	March 17, 2018	May 25, 2019	
Pierre da Silva	July 28, 1998	MF	United States	2017–2019	4	0	March 19, 2017	September 16, 2018	
Danny Deakin †	September 6, 1993	MF	England	2017	0	0	N/A	N/A	
Alex DeJohn	May 10, 1991	DF	United States	2019–2020	15	0	March 2, 2019	October 18, 2020	
Joey DeZart	June 9, 1998	MF	Jamaica	2020–2022	30	0	July 25, 2020	May 28, 2022	
**Daryl Dike**	June 3, 2000	FW	United States	2020–2021; 2026–present	47	20	July 25, 2020	August 22, 2026	
Derek Dodson †	November 3, 1998	FW	United States	2021	0	0	N/A	N/A	
Conor Donovan	January 8, 1996	DF	United States	2015–2017	2	0	June 18, 2015	August 9, 2015	
**Griffin Dorsey**	March 5, 1999	DF	United States	2026–present	22	5	February 21, 2026	August 22, 2026	
Dom Dwyer ‡	July 30, 1990	FW	United States	2017–2020	70	24	July 29, 2017	July 14, 2020	
**Justin Ellis**	May 14, 2007	FW	United States	2025–present	21	3	May 14, 2025	August 22, 2026	
Mohamed El Monir	April 8, 1992	DF	Libya	2018	29	0	March 4, 2018	October 28, 2018	
Ramiro Enrique	May 21, 2001	FW	Argentina	2023–2025	102	25	February 25, 2023	September 25, 2025	
Estrela †‡	September 22, 1995	DF	Angola	2015	0	0	N/A	N/A	
Felipe	September 30, 1990	MF	Brazil	2023–2024	37	0	March 7, 2023	October 19, 2024	
Alex Freeman	August 9, 2004	DF	United States	2022–2026	42	6	April 29, 2023	October 22, 2025	
Devron García †	February 17, 1996	DF	Honduras	2016	0	0	N/A	N/A	
**Joran Gerbet**	June 30, 2001	MF	France	2025–present	27	0	February 22, 2025	August 22, 2026	
Luis Gil	September 29, 1993	MF	United States	2017	18	0	April 9, 2017	August 6, 2017	
Heine Gikling Bruseth †	April 6, 2004	MF	Norway	2024	0	0	N/A	N/A	
Nicholas Gioacchini	July 25, 2000	FW	United States	2022	7	0	July 27, 2022	September 17, 2022	
Ignacio Gómez	April 4, 2006	MF	Argentina	2026	2	1	April 18, 2026	April 22, 2026	
Gastón González	June 27, 2001	FW	Argentina	2022–2024	21	0	March 4, 2023	October 21, 2023	
Alejandro Granados	May 30, 2006	MF	Spain	2023	1	0	June 10, 2023	June 10, 2023	
**Antoine Griezmann**	March 21, 1991	FW	France	2026–present	9	4	July 22, 2026	August 22, 2026	
**Colin Guske**	January 29, 2007	MF	United States	2024–present	16	0	April 5, 2025	August 12, 2026	
Brandon Hackenberg †	July 2, 1999	DF	United States	2022	0	0	N/A	N/A	
Michael Halliday	January 22, 2003	DF	United States	2020–2024	43	0	May 29, 2021	October 5, 2024	
Harrison Heath ‡	March 6, 1996	MF	England	2015–2016	10	0	May 14, 2015	July 14, 2016	
Cristian Higuita	January 12, 1994	MF	Colombia	2015–2019	108	6	March 8, 2015	September 22, 2019	
Seb Hines	May 29, 1988	DF	England	2015–2017	59	5	March 8, 2015	October 22, 2017	
Rio Hope-Gund †	August 20, 1999	DF	United States	2021	0	0	N/A	N/A	
**Robin Jansson**	November 15, 1991	DF	Sweden	2019–present	256	7	March 24, 2019	August 22, 2026	
Will Johnson	January 21, 1987	MF	Canada	2017–2019	80	4	March 5, 2017	October 6, 2019	
Juninho	January 23, 2001	MF	Brazil	2023	2	0	June 17, 2023	July 21, 2023	
Kaká	April 22, 1982	MF	Brazil	2015–2017	78	25	March 8, 2015	October 15, 2017	
Ercan Kara	January 3, 1996	FW	Austria	2022–2023	53	18	February 27, 2022	August 2, 2023	
Sacha Kljestan	September 9, 1985	MF	United States	2018–2019	60	9	March 17, 2018	October 6, 2019	
Jeorgio Kocevski	August 19, 2002	MF	United States	2024	12	0	March 17, 2024	September 21, 2024	
Cyle Larin	April 17, 1995	FW	Canada	2015–2017	89	44	March 22, 2015	September 30, 2017	
Richie Laryea	January 7, 1995	MF	Canada	2016–2018	21	0	June 25, 2017	October 18, 2018	
Pedro Leão	June 28, 2006	FW	Brazil	2026	1	0	March 14, 2026	March 14, 2026	
Cameron Lindley	July 18, 1997	MF	United States	2018–2019	4	0	March 4, 2018	July 19, 2018	
Nicolás Lodeiro	March 21, 1989	MF	Uruguay	2024	46	2	February 21, 2024	November 30, 2024	
David Loera	September 10, 1998	MF	United States	2020–2021	4	0	October 3, 2020	August 12, 2021	
Favian Loyola	May 18, 2005	MF	Chile	2023–2025	1	0	July 1, 2023	July 1, 2023	
Jack Lynn	January 12, 2000	FW	United States	2022–2024	22	2	April 24, 2022	November 30, 2024	
**Adrián Marín**	January 9, 1997	DF	Spain	2025–present	29	0	August 23, 2025	August 19, 2026	
Emmanuel Mas	January 15, 1989	DF	Argentina	2021	18	0	July 25, 2021	November 23, 2021	
David Mateos	April 22, 1987	DF	Spain	2015–2017	28	1	August 16, 2015	October 2, 2016	
Duncan McGuire	February 5, 2001	FW	United States	2023–2026	109	32	March 11, 2023	May 23, 2026	
Jhegson Méndez	April 26, 1997	MF	Ecuador	2019–2022	83	1	March 2, 2019	July 4, 2022	
Randy Mendoza	March 21, 1996	DF	United States	2019	1	0	June 13, 2019	June 13, 2019	
Justin Meram	December 4, 1988	FW	Iraq	2018	18	2	March 4, 2018	July 7, 2018	
Benji Michel	October 23, 1997	FW	United States	2019–2022	118	19	April 1, 2019	October 16, 2022	
Kamal Miller	May 16, 1997	DF	Canada	2019–2020	30	0	March 2, 2019	November 29, 2020	
**Nolan Miller**	August 3, 2004	DF	United States	2026–	6	0	February 21, 2026	April 15, 2026	
Shak Mohammed	August 27, 2003	FW	Ghana	2023–2025	5	0	February 27, 2024	October 11, 2025	
Kevin Molino ‡	June 17, 1990	MF	Trinidad and Tobago	2015–2016	39	12	March 8, 2015	October 23, 2016	
João Moutinho	January 12, 1998	DF	Portugal	2019–2022	85	3	March 24, 2019	October 16, 2022	
Chris Mueller	August 29, 1996	FW	United States	2018–2021	126	22	March 4, 2018	November 23, 2021	
Jake Mulraney	April 5, 1996	MF	(Republic of Ireland) Ireland	2022	18	0	May 7, 2022	October 16, 2022	
Luis Muriel	April 16, 1991	FW	Colombia	2024–2026	84	17	February 27, 2024	October 22, 2025	
Danny Mwanga	July 17, 1991	FW	(Democratic Republic of the Congo) DR Congo	2015	7	0	March 28, 2015	September 6, 2015	
Nani	November 17, 1986	FW	Portugal	2019–2021	88	31	March 2, 2019	November 23, 2021	
Lewis Neal ‡	July 14, 1981	MF	England	2015	23	1	March 8, 2015	October 25, 2015	
Antonio Nocerino	April 9, 1985	MF	Italy	2016–2017	55	1	March 12, 2016	October 22, 2017	
**Vinícius Nogueira**	December 11, 2001	DF	Brazil	2026–present	0	0	N/A	N/A	
**Braian Ojeda**	June 27, 2000	MF	Paraguay	2026–present	21	1	February 21, 2026	August 1, 2026	
**Martín Ojeda**	November 27, 1998	MF	Argentina	2023–present	147	43	February 25, 2023	May 23, 2026	
Amobi Okugo	March 13, 1991	MF	United States	2015	17	0	March 8, 2015	July 12, 2015	
Shane O'Neill	September 2, 1993	DF	United States	2018–2019	26	0	July 19, 2018	October 6, 2019	
**Luis Otávio**	April 12, 2007	MF	Brazil	2026–present	20	1	March 7, 2026	August 22, 2026	
**Marco Pašalić**	September 14, 2000	FW	Croatia	2025–present	58	19	February 22, 2025	August 22, 2026	
Martin Paterson	May 10, 1987	FW	Northern Ireland	2015	4	0	May 17, 2015	July 26, 2015	
Santiago Patiño	March 10, 1997	FW	Colombia	2019–2020	17	2	March 16, 2019	August 11, 2020	
Alexandre Pato	September 2, 1989	FW	Brazil	2021–2022	32	4	April 17, 2021	August 13, 2022	
Victor "PC" Giro	March 10, 1994	DF	Brazil	2017–2018	18	1	May 18, 2017	August 25, 2018	
Andrés Perea	November 14, 2000	MF	United States	2020–2022	86	4	February 29, 2020	October 9, 2022	
Léo Pereira	January 31, 1996	DF	Brazil	2017	11	0	May 18, 2017	October 22, 2017	
Mauricio Pereyra	March 15, 1990	MF	Uruguay	2019–2023	136	7	August 18, 2019	November 25, 2023	
Matías Pérez García	October 13, 1984	MF	Argentina	2016–2017	28	1	August 8, 2016	June 25, 2017	
Luca Petrasso	June 16, 2000	DF	Canada	2023–2024	17	0	February 25, 2023	October 2, 2024	
Stefano Pinho	January 12, 1991	FW	Brazil	2018	26	3	March 4, 2018	September 23, 2018	
Dillon Powers	February 14, 1991	MF	United States	2017–2019	21	1	August 27, 2017	September 8, 2019	
Rafael Ramos ‡	January 9, 1995	DF	Portugal	2015–2017	44	0	March 8, 2015	July 6, 2017	
Tahir Reid-Brown	July 2, 2006	DF	United States	2024–2026	9	0	March 1, 2026	April 30, 2026	
Tommy Redding ‡	January 24, 1997	DF	United States	2015–2017	41	0	August 9, 2015	October 22, 2017	
**Bernardo Rhein**	September 21, 2007	MF	Brazil	2026–present	7	0	April 22, 2026	August 15, 2026	
Pedro Ribeiro	June 13, 1990	FW	Brazil	2015–2016	25	2	March 14, 2015	March 19, 2016	
Carlos Rivas	April 15, 1994	FW	Colombia	2015–2017	82	12	March 8, 2015	October 22, 2017	
Sidney Rivera †	November 15, 1993	DF	Puerto Rico	2015	0	0	N/A	N/A	
Wilfredo Rivera †	October 14, 2003	FW	Puerto Rico	2021–2024	0	0	N/A	N/A	
Robinho	January 19, 1995	FW	Brazil	2019–2020	12	0	July 19, 2019	November 29, 2020	
Tony Rocha	August 21, 1993	MF	Belize	2016–2018	26	0	June 16, 2016	October 14, 2018	
Bryan Róchez	January 1, 1995	FW	Honduras	2015–2017	17	3	March 8, 2015	October 17, 2015	
**Nicolás Rodríguez**	April 25, 2004	FW	Colombia	2025–present	17	1	February 22, 2025	October 11, 2025	
Oriol Rosell	July 7, 1992	MF	Spain	2018–2021	73	0	April 22, 2018	November 7, 2021	
Ruan	May 29, 1995	DF	Brazil	2019–2022	118	4	March 9, 2019	October 16, 2022	
Abdi Salim	April 1, 2001	DF	Somalia	2023–2024	4	0	March 4, 2023	February 27, 2024	
Moussa Sane †	January 18, 1997	FW	Senegal	2017	0	0	N/A	N/A	
Lamine Sané	March 22, 1987	DF	Senegal	2018–2019	47	1	March 17, 2018	September 29, 2019	
Rafael Santos	February 5, 1998	DF	Brazil	2023–2025	96	2	March 11, 2023	July 19, 2025	
**Harvey Sarajian**	January 26, 2005	FW	United States	2026–present	7	0	April 18, 2026	August 12, 2026	
Rodrigo Schlegel	April 3, 1997	DF	Argentina	2020–2025	180	4	March 7, 2020	October 22, 2025	
Chris Schuler	September 6, 1987	DF	United States	2018	10	1	May 6, 2018	October 28, 2018	
Brek Shea	February 28, 1990	DF	United States	2015–2016	47	3	March 8, 2015	September 29, 2016	
Kyle Smith	January 9, 1992	DF	United States	2019–2025	216	5	March 2, 2019	October 18, 2025	
Jonathan Spector	March 1, 1986	DF	United States	2017–2018	41	1	March 5, 2017	September 23, 2018	
**Tyrese Spicer**	December 4, 2000	FW	(Trinidad and Tobago) Trinidad & Tobago	2025–	33	9	August 10, 2025	August 22, 2026	
Sean St Ledger	December 28, 1984	DF	(Republic of Ireland) Ireland	2015	18	0	March 8, 2015	July 26, 2015	
Scott Sutter	May 13, 1986	DF	Switzerland	2017–2018	51	4	April 1, 2017	October 28, 2018	
**Zakaria Taifi**	October 1, 2005	DF	United States	2025–present	29	1	April 19, 2025	August 22, 2026	
Amro Tarek	May 17, 1992	DF	Egypt	2018	22	1	March 4, 2018	October 28, 2018	
**Iago Teodoro**	April 18, 2005	DF	Brazil	2026–present	17	1	February 21, 2026	August 12, 2026	
**Tiago**	April 8, 2005	FW	Brazil	2026–present	22	3	February 21, 2026	August 22, 2026	
Dagur Dan Þórhallsson	May 2, 2000	MF	Iceland	2023–2025	116	9	February 25, 2023	October 18, 2025	
Donny Toia	May 28, 1992	DF	United States	2017–2018	35	0	March 5, 2017	July 19, 2018	
Facundo Torres	April 13, 2000	FW	Uruguay	2022–2024	123	47	February 27, 2022	November 30, 2024	
**Yutaro Tsukada**	July 28, 2001	FW	Japan	2024–present	7	0	May 15, 2024	April 15, 2026	
Tyler Turner ‡	April 3, 1996	DF	United States	2015–2016	8	0	March 28, 2015	August 16, 2015	
Júnior Urso	March 10, 1989	MF	Brazil	2020–2022; 2023	112	14	February 29, 2020	November 25, 2023	
Silvester van der Water	September 30, 1996	FW	Netherlands	2021–2022	34	3	April 17, 2021	April 30, 2022	
Jose Villarreal	September 10, 1993	FW	United States	2018	5	0	June 3, 2018	August 25, 2018	
Thomas Williams	August 15, 2004	DF	United States	2021–2025	6	0	April 16, 2022	April 19, 2025	
Adrian Winter	July 8, 1986	MF	Switzerland	2015–2016	23	5	August 9, 2015	June 30, 2016	
Yoshimar Yotún	April 7, 1990	MF	Peru	2017–2018	32	5	August 13, 2017	October 28, 2018	

=== Goalkeepers ===
Name	D.O.B.	Pos	Nationality	Years	Games	Debut	Most recent match	Ref
Brandon Austin	January 7, 1999	GK	England	2021	5	June 19, 2021	July 7, 2021	
Joe Bendik	April 25, 1989	GK	United States	2016–2018	92	March 6, 2016	October 7, 2018	
**Maxime Crépeau**	May 11, 1994	GK	Canada	2026–	22	February 21, 2026	August 22, 2026	
Earl Edwards Jr.	January 24, 1992	GK	United States	2015–2018	12	June 17, 2015	August 5, 2018	
Jake Fenlason †	February 2, 1993	GK	United States	2017	0	N/A	N/A	
Josh Ford	November 6, 1987	GK	United States	2015	2	October 17, 2015	October 25, 2015	
Pedro Gallese	February 23, 1990	GK	Peru	2020–2025	201	February 29, 2020	October 22, 2025	
Adam Grinwis	April 21, 1992	GK	United States	2018–2019; 2021–2023	11	September 22, 2018	September 10, 2021	
Tally Hall	May 12, 1985	GK	United States	2015	25	May 17, 2015	October 17, 2015	
**Tristan Himes** †	July 15, 2003	GK	United States	2026–present	0	N/A	N/A	
Carlos Mercado †	September 27, 1999	GK	United States	2024–2025	0	N/A	N/A	
Trey Mitchell †	April 22, 1991	GK	United States	2015	0	N/A	N/A	
**Javier Otero**	November 18, 2002	GK	Venezuela	2022–present	10	June 28, 2024	August 12, 2026	
Greg Ranjitsingh	July 18, 1993	GK	Trinidad and Tobago	2019; 2021	2	May 15, 2019	July 19, 2019	
Donovan Ricketts	June 7, 1977	GK	Jamaica	2015	10	March 8, 2015	May 14, 2015	
Brian Rowe	November 16, 1988	GK	United States	2019–2020	37	March 2, 2019	November 29, 2020	
Josh Saunders	March 2, 1981	GK	Puerto Rico	2017	1	June 15, 2017	June 15, 2017	
Mason Stajduhar	December 2, 1997	GK	United States	2016–2024	22	July 30, 2021	June 28, 2024	

== By nationality ==
MLS regulations allow for eight international roster slots per team to be used on non-domestic players. However, this limit can be exceeded by trading international slots with another MLS team. Overseas players are exempt from counting towards this total if they have permanent residency rights in the U.S. (green card holder), other special dispensation such as refugee or asylum status, or qualify under the Homegrown International Rule. In total, 175 players representing 39 different nations have played for Orlando City.

Note: Countries indicate national team as defined under FIFA eligibility rules. Players may hold more than one non-FIFA nationality.

Country	Total players
Argentina	7
Austria	1
Belize	1
Brazil	21
Canada	8
Chile	1
Colombia	5
DR Congo	1
Ecuador	2
Egypt	1
El Salvador	1
England	5
France	2
Ghana	1
Guinea	1
Honduras	2
Iceland	1
Iraq	1
Italy	1
Jamaica	3
Japan	1
Libya	1
Netherlands	1
Northern Ireland	1
Paraguay	2
Peru	4
Portugal	3
Puerto Rico	1
Ireland	2
Senegal	1
Slovenia	1
Somalia	1
Spain	4
Sweden	1
Switzerland	2
Trinidad and Tobago	3
United States	51
Uruguay	5
Venezuela	2

== Sources ==
- By Season | MLSsoccer.com
