= Zakaria Taifi =

American soccer player (born 2005)

- Taifi with Orlando City in 2026

Personal information
- Date of birth: October 1, 2005 (age 21)
- Place of birth: Orlando, Florida, U.S.
- Height: 6 ft 0 in (1.83 m)
- Positions: Right-back; center-back

Team information
- Current team: Orlando City
- Number: 19

Youth career
- 2015–2024: Orlando City

Senior career*
Years	Team	Apps	(Gls)
2022–2025	Orlando City B	44	(1)
2025	→ Orlando City (loan)	1	(0)
2025–	Orlando City	31	(0)
2025–2026	→ Orlando City B (loan)	10	(1)
- * Club domestic league appearances and goals as of 23:42, November 7, 2026 (UTC)

Zakaria Taifi (born October 1, 2005) is an American professional soccer player who plays as a right-back or center-back for Major League Soccer club Orlando City.

Taifi was the first player to sign a permanent contract with the first team of Orlando City after joining the team's academy at the youngest possible age group when he became the team's 19th homegrown player in 2025.

== Youth career ==
Taifi joined the Orlando City academy in 2015 at the U9 level. In 2021, Taifi was a major contributor to the academy winning the 2021 U17 MLS Next Cup against the Player Development Academy.

On November 14, 2023, Taifi committed to attending the University of Portland and joining the Portland Pilots following graduation in 2024, but ultimately did not play college soccer.

== Club career ==
=== Orlando City B ===
Taifi made the bench four times in 2022 for Orlando City B in MLS Next Pro, first being made available from the academy on August 20 against Columbus Crew 2.

On March 16, 2023, Taifi made his professional debut when he came on as a 78th-minute substitute for Yutaro Tsukada in a 3–2 win over Atlanta United 2. In the following match six days later against Huntsville City, Taifi made his first start, helping the game to end 1–1. In the following penalty-kick shoot-out, Taifi missed his penalty, but the team would win the shoot-out 4–3 regardless.

On March 12, 2024, Taifi was promoted from the academy and signed a two-year contract with the developmental team. On March 9, 2025, Taifi scored the first goal of his senior career, the second goal of a 2–1 win over Columbus Crew 2.

=== Orlando City ===
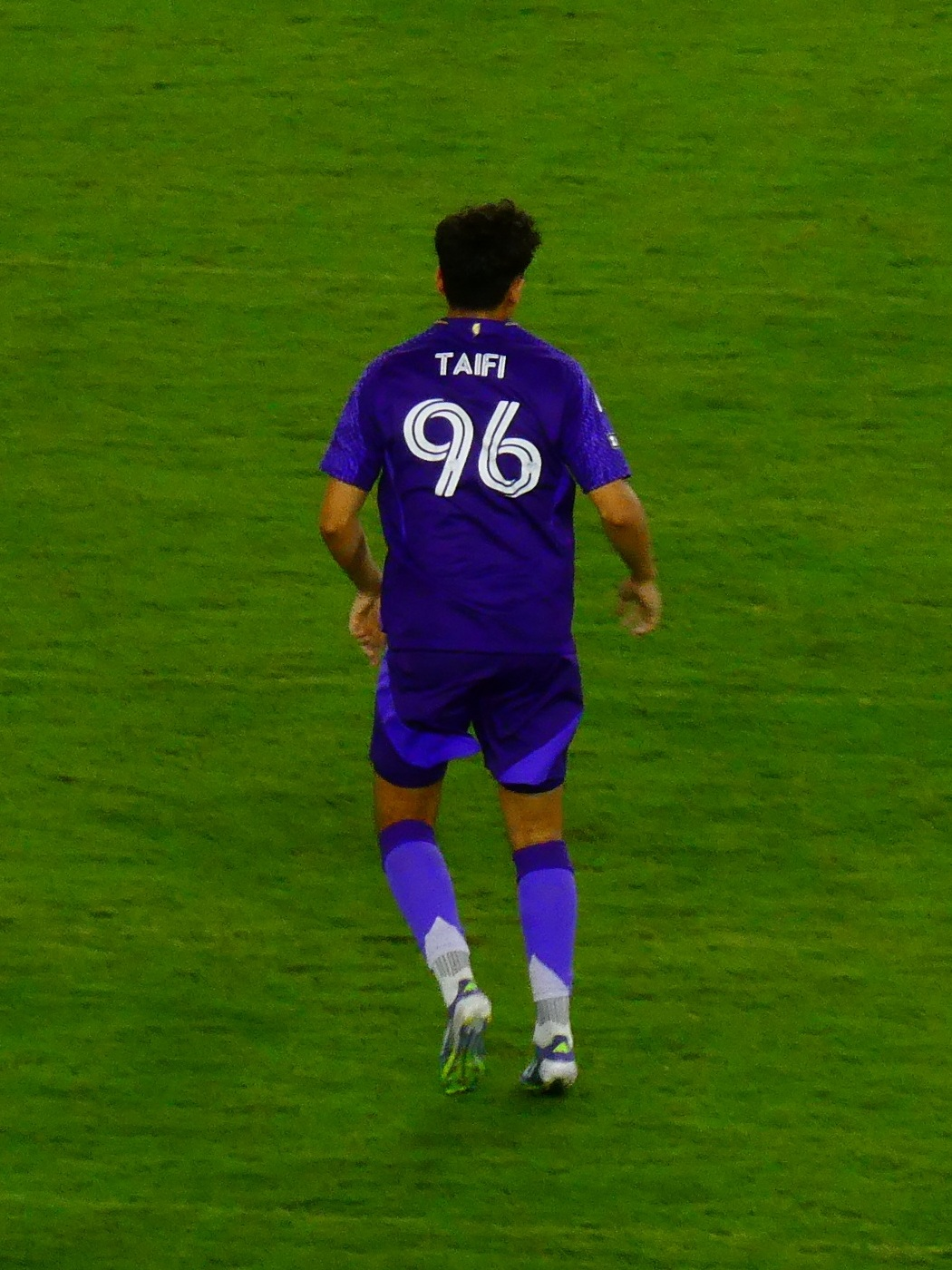
Taifi with his original number in 2025

On January 27, 2024, Taifi made his unofficial debut when he appeared as a 79th-minute substitute in a 1–1 draw with Brazilian club Flamengo during the 2024 FC Series. The following season, on March 1, 2025, Taifi signed his first short-term agreement with Orlando City which would see him made available for a match against Toronto FC on the same day, but he would be an unused substitute.

Ahead of a match at CF Montréal on April 19, Taifi signed another short-term agreement, and he would make his debut for the team as an 85th-minute substitute for Martín Ojeda in a scoreless draw.

On May 17, Taifi signed a homegrown contract through 2026 with club options for 2027, 2028, and 2029, making him the 19th homegrown player for the club. Taifi's signing also made him the first player to advance fully through Orlando's development pathway as he joined at the youngest possible age at the U9 youth level.

In November, Taifi trained with Portuguese club Moreirense, which is 70% owned by Black Knight Football Club UK Limited, the ownership group which Orlando City has an affiliation with, at the behest of Moreirense manager Vasco Botelho da Costa.

On February 21, 2026, Taifi came on as an 86th-minute substitute for Griffin Dorsey as Orlando City trailed the New York Red Bulls two goals to zero and provided his first goal contribution for Orlando City via an assist to Tiago, but Orlando City still lost 2–1. Taifi scored his first goal for Orlando City on April 29 in the U.S. Open Cup against the New England Revolution via a cross from Tyrese Spicer to secure a 4–3 win in added time.

== International career ==
Taifi was called up to the Morocco national under-23 for training camp in Salé, Morocco, in June 2026.

== Personal life ==
Taifi is eligible to represent Morocco. Taifi began playing soccer and practicing jiu-jitsu when he was 4-years-old, but made the full-time switch to soccer six years later after he earned his green belt, the highest belt he could earn before the age of 16. Taifi began attending Florida Virtual School in 8th grade. After his time at Florida Virtual School, Taifi attended SAI Academy in St. Cloud, Florida, where he graduated in 2024.

== Career statistics ==
As of match played November 7, 2026

Appearances and goals by club, season, and competition
Club	Season	League			U.S. Open Cup		Continental		Playoffs		Other		Total	
Club	Season	Division	Apps	Goals	Apps	Goals	Apps	Goals	Apps	Goals	Apps	Goals	Apps	Goals
Orlando City B	2022	MLS Next Pro	0	0	—		—		—		—		0	0
Orlando City B	2023	MLS Next Pro	23	0	—		—		0	0	—		23	0
Orlando City B	2024	MLS Next Pro	13	0	—		—		0	0	—		13	0
Orlando City B	2025	MLS Next Pro	8	1	—		—		—		—		13	1
Orlando City B	Total		49	1	0	0	0	0	0	0	0	0	49	1
Orlando City (loan)	2025	Major League Soccer	1	0	—		—		—		—		1	0
Orlando City	2025	Major League Soccer	5	0	1	0	—		0	0	2 (Note: Appearances in Leagues Cup)	0	8	0
Orlando City	2026	Major League Soccer	26	0	4	1	—		—		3	0	33	1
Orlando City	Orlando City total		32	0	5	1	0	0	0	0	5	0	42	1
Orlando City B (loan)	2025	MLS Next Pro	7	0	—		—		—		—		7	0
Orlando City B (loan)	2026	MLS Next Pro	3	1	—		—		—		—		3	1
Orlando City B (loan)	Total		10	1	0	0	0	0	0	0	0	0	10	1
Career total			86	2	5	1	0	0	0	0	5	0	96	3
