= Justin Ellis (soccer) =

American soccer player (born 2007)

- Ellis with Orlando City in 2026

Personal information
- Date of birth: May 14, 2007 (age 19)
- Place of birth: Wellington, Florida, US
- Height: 6 ft 0 in (1.83 m)
- Position: Forward

Team information
- Current team: Orlando City
- Number: 22

Youth career
- 2021–2022: Inter Miami
- 2023–2025: Orlando City

Senior career*
Years	Team	Apps	(Gls)
2024–2025	Orlando City B	40	(9)
2025	→ Orlando City (loan)	1	(0)
2026–	Orlando City	24	(1)
2026	→ Orlando City B (loan)	4	(3)

International career^{‡}
2024–2025	United States U18	7	(4)
2025–	United States U19	3	(1)
2026–	United States	4	(2)
- * Club domestic league appearances and goals as of 21:02, October 31, 2026 (UTC) ‡ National team caps and goals as of 02:24, November 15, 2026 (UTC)

Justin Ellis (born May 14, 2007) is an American professional soccer player who plays as a forward for Major League Soccer club Orlando City and the United States national team.

Ellis first joined a Major League Soccer academy in 2021 when he joined the academy of Inter Miami, but in 2023 he joined their rivals Orlando City, with whom he became Orlando's 19th homegrown signing after making his professional debut with their reserve team, Orlando City B, the year prior.

== Youth career ==
=== Inter Miami ===
Ellis participated in Major League Soccer club Inter Miami's under-15 team from 2021 to 2022. Ellis scored six goals across nine appearances in MLS Next under-15 and a further four goals across seven appearances in the 2022 under-15 Generation Adidas Cup.

In the next season, Ellis moved up to Inter Miami's under-17 team and made five appearances, but failed to score a goal.

=== Orlando City ===
Ellis transferred to the academy of Inter Miami's rival Orlando City for the remainder of the 2022/23 MLS Next under-17 season. With the academy, Ellis made 14 appearances and scored three goals.

Ellis finished as the top scorer with six goals in the 2025 U-18 Generation Adidas Cup, helping the academy side to the trophy on April 21. MLS Next named Ellis to the U-18 best starting eleven at the tournament a day later. On July 17, Ellis was named the 2024–25 U19 MLS NEXT most valuable player for scoring 18 goals across the regular season and for his performance at the aforementioned tournament.

== Club career ==
=== Orlando City B ===
On March 15, 2024, Ellis was announced as part of Orlando City's reserve affiliate roster, Orlando City B, for the 2024 MLS Next Pro season. A day later, Ellis made his professional debut in the first matchday of the season when he came on as an 86th-minute substitute for Wilfredo Rivera in a 3–2 loss to Atlanta United 2. In the following match against Huntsville City, Ellis made his first start and scored his first professional goal of his career, helping the game to end in a 1–1 draw, before he was substituted out in the 78th-minute for Majed Abdullah. Ellis scored just one more goal across a total of 18 appearances in his first professional season of his career.

On May 20, 2025, Ellis was named player of the matchweek for his performance against rivals Inter Miami II three days earlier in which he scored a penalty and provided two assists in a 3–0 win. On July 6, Ellis scored his first professional brace, one of which was a penalty, in a 2–2 draw against Crown Legacy in which the Young Lions won the penalty shootout for an extra point. In the following match on July 13, Ellis scored another brace, again with the help of a penalty, to help defeat Carolina Core 3–1. Ellis finished the 2025 season as the top goal contributor on the team with seven goals and five assists and as the second-highest goalscorer behind Shak Mohammed with 11.

=== Orlando City ===
Ellis with Orlando City in 2026

On May 10, 2025, Ellis signed his first short-term agreement with Orlando City to make him available for a match against the New England Revolution, but he would be an unused substitute as the team drew 3–3. On May 14, Ellis signed another short-term agreement ahead of a match against Charlotte FC and he would make his debut as an 88th-minute substitute for Martín Ojeda.

Ellis signed a two season homegrown player contract (with a team option for two more seasons) with Orlando City on February 20, 2026, becoming the team's 19th homegrown player. On April 22, Ellis made his first start for Orlando City in a match against Charlotte FC, and during the match he provided an assist to Martín Ojeda to help guide Orlando City to a 4–1 win. In the following match three days later, Ellis scored his first goal for the senior team when he scored off a rebound in a 3–2 loss to D.C. United. On April 29, Ellis continued his goal contributing form in a 4–3 win over the New England Revolution in the U.S. Open Cup. Ellis provided an assist to Griffin Dorsey via a one-two and later converted another rebounded ball off a cross from Tyrese Spicer. Ellis provided the game-winning assist on July 25 to Spicer in a 1–0 win over league leaders Nashville SC, and his overall performance throughout the match saw him named to the Team of the Matchday for the first time in his career. On October 20, Ellis was ranked fifth in the league's annual 22 Under 22 rankings, behind Cavan Sullivan, Julian Hall, Adri Mehmeti, and Mbekezeli Mbokazi.

== International career ==
Ellis was eligible to represent the United States as well as Uruguay through his mother; however, he is now cap-tied to the United States.

=== Youth career ===
On September 6, 2024, Ellis received his first call-up to the United States U18 squad by Michael Nsien for training camp in Niigata, Japan and for friendlies against a local select Niigata team, Japan, and Peru. On September 14, Ellis made his debut for the team and scored the winning goal in the 93rd-minute against Japan, securing a 4–3 victory. Ellis followed up his game-winning performance by scoring the opening goal of a 2–0 victory over Peru two days later.

On March 16, 2025, Ellis was once again called up to the U18 squad, this time by Marlon LeBlanc and for training camp in Marbella, Spain, and friendlies against Morocco and Norway. On March 22, Ellis scored the United States' opening goal in a 2–2 draw with Morocco. On May 28, Ellis received another call-up, this time to compete in the UEFA Friendship Cup in Nyon, Switzerland from May 30–June 11, in a group with France, Argentina, and Australia. The United States advanced to the final of the UEFA Friendship Cup by going undefeated, with Ellis scoring in extra time against Australia, allowing them to win their group and face Portugal. The United States and Portugal drew 1–1 and the United States won the subsequent penalty shoot-out 3–2.

On August 29, 2025, Ellis received his first call-up to the United States U19 squad for a training camp being hosted at McCurry Park in Fayetteville, Georgia from September 1 to 8. On October 3, Ellis received another call up, this time for training camp between October 6 and 15 in San Pedro del Pinatar, Spain and friendly matches against Northern Ireland and Belgium. On November 7, Ellis was again selected for the U19 squad, this time for the UEFA U-19 Youth Tournament from November 10 to 18 in which they would face Germany, Wales, and Japan.

On March 19, 2026, Ellis received his first call-up of the year to the U19 squad, this time for training camp in Alicante, Spain, in preparation for the 2026 CONCACAF U-20 Championship. Nine days after the call-up, the United States were scheduled to face Wales in a friendly. Ellis scored the final goal of the United States' 4–0 victory. On May 28, Ellis was again called up to the U19 squad, this time for training at the Arthur M. Blank US Soccer National Training Center and for a friendly against Japan on June 9.

=== Senior career ===
On September 17, 2026, Ellis was called up to the United States senior team by Mauricio Pochettino for friendlies against Peru, Chile, Mexico, and Canada from September 26 to October 6. The call-up consisted of multiple other, mostly young, players who had never been called up to the senior team before. The week prior to Ellis' call-up, he had been visited by Uruguay head coach Diego Forlán. Ellis started and scored during his debut on September 26 against Peru at Inter.co Stadium in Orlando. Ellis had drawn a foul near the sideline of the pitch about 25 yards (23 m) from goal, setting up a free kick into the penalty area which Giovanni Reyna delivered and Ellis headed into the back of the Peru net. The United States ultimately won the game 4–1. On October 6, Ellis scored the lone goal of a 1–0 win over Canada, after having suffered an injury earlier in the match and receiving medical treatment, to help the United States end the international window with all wins. On November 4, Pochettino recalled Ellis to the national team for the two legs of the CONCACAF Nations League quarter-finals matches against Haiti later that month.

== Style of play ==
Ellis has been described as a "complete striker" who can perform well in various tactical configurations and who is both comfortable making goal-scoring opportunities for himself and for others. Ellis has also been described as being very comfortable on the ball and able to withstand a lot of pressure from defenders.

== Career statistics ==
=== Club ===
As of match played November 19, 2026

Appearances and goals by club, season, and competition
Club	Season	League			U.S. Open Cup		North America		Playoffs		Other		Total	
Club	Season	Division	Apps	Goals	Apps	Goals	Apps	Goals	Apps	Goals	Apps	Goals	Apps	Goals
Orlando City B	2024	MLS Next Pro	18	2	—		—		0	0	—		18	2
Orlando City B	2025	MLS Next Pro	22	7	—		—		—		—		22	7
Orlando City B	Total		40	9	0	0	0	0	0	0	—		40	9
Orlando City (loan)	2025	Major League Soccer	1	0	—		—		—		—		1	0
Orlando City	2026	Major League Soccer	24	1	4	1	—		1		3 (Note: Appearances in Leagues Cup)	1	32	3
Orlando City	Orlando City total		25	1	4	1	0	0	1	0	3	1	33	3
Orlando City B (loan)	2026	MLS Next Pro	4	3	—		—		—		—		4	3
Career total			69	13	4	1	0	0	1	0	3	1	77	15

=== International ===
As of match played November 14, 2026

Appearances and goals by national team and year
National team	Year	Apps	Goals
United States	2026	4	2
Total		4	2

Scores and results list United States's goal tally first, score column indicates score after each Ellis goal.

List of international goals scored by Justin Ellis
No.	Date	Venue	Cap	Opponent	Score	Result	Competition
1	September 26, 2026	Inter.co Stadium, Orlando, United States	1	Peru	1–0	4–1	Friendly
2	October 6, 2026	Allianz Field, Saint Paul, United States	3	Canada	1–0	1–0	Friendly

== Honors ==
Individual

- MLS NEXT Pro Pathway Player of the Year: 2026
