= Inter Miami CF–Orlando City SC rivalry =

Soccer rivalry between Inter Miami CF and Orlando City SC

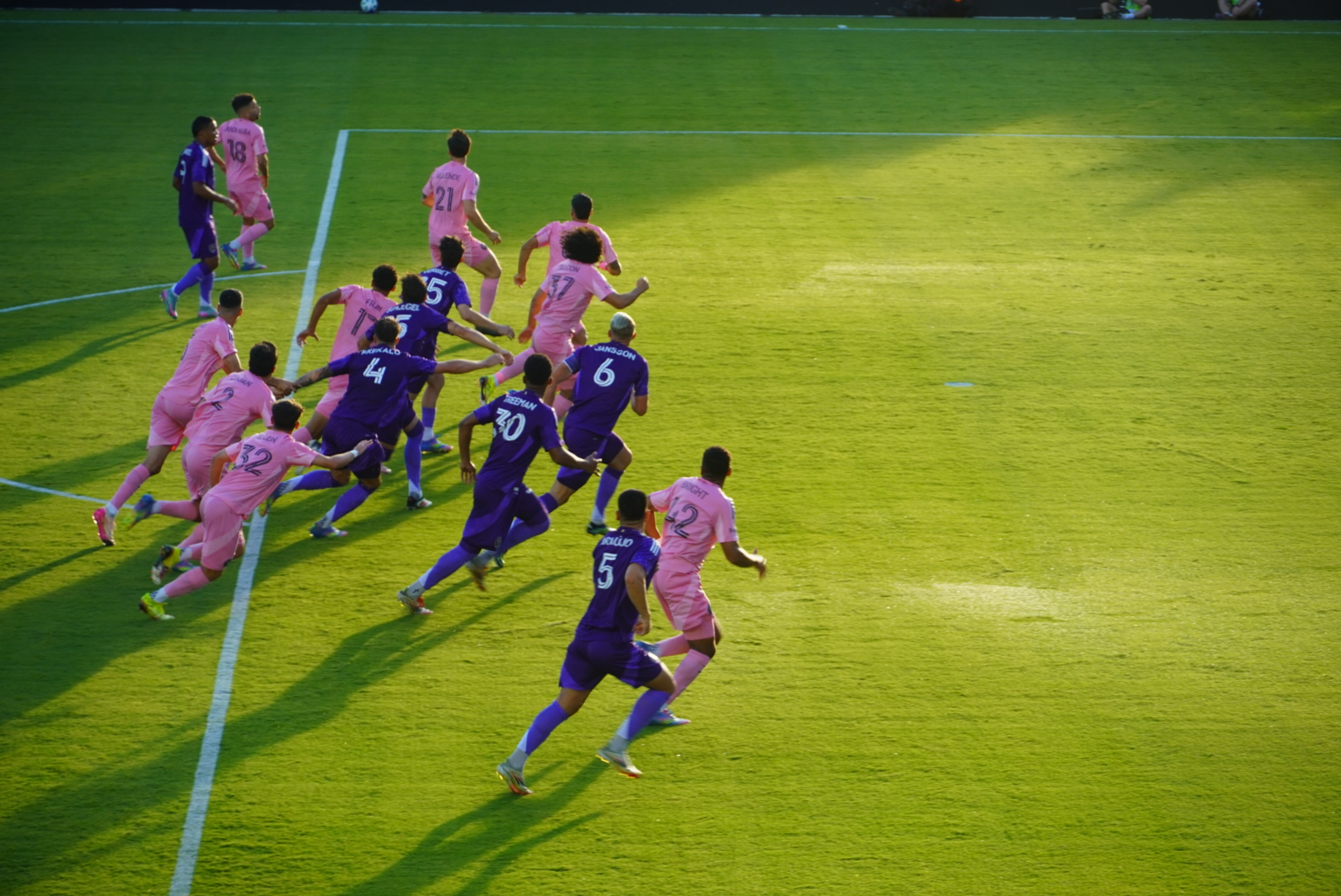
- Inter Miami and Orlando City players racing for the ball in 2025
- Other names: Florida Derby, Florida Clásico, El Clásico del Sol, Tropic Thunder
- Location: Florida
- Teams: Inter Miami CF; Orlando City SC
- First meeting: July 8, 2020; MLS is Back Tournament; ORL 2–1 MIA
- Latest meeting: May 2, 2026; MLS regular season MIA 3–4 ORL

Statistics
- Total meetings: 20
- Most wins: Orlando City (8)
- Most player appearances: Robin Jansson (16)
- Top scorer: Lionel Messi (9)
- Largest victory: MIA 5–0 ORL; MLS regular season (March 2, 2024)
- Location of the two teams' stadiums in Florida

The Inter Miami–Orlando City rivalry, also known as the Florida Derby, is a professional soccer rivalry between the two Florida-based Major League Soccer (MLS) clubs: Inter Miami and Orlando City.

== Background ==
Although not an official MLS rivalry cup, the clubs share an intrastate rivalry. Orlando City joined the MLS in 2015 whereas Inter Miami joined in 2020, meaning Orlando City had to wait until its sixth season to play a rival from the same state in the league. The fixture is mostly referred to as the Florida Derby, after the dormant previous soccer rivalry between clubs based in Fort Lauderdale (several iterations of the Fort Lauderdale Strikers) and the sides from Tampa Bay (the old Rowdies, Mutiny, and the current Rowdies).

Prior to the teams' entries to MLS, there was a separate rivalry that existed during the early years of the league. In that period, the Tampa Bay Mutiny and Miami Fusion were the teams that were involved in the Florida Derby. The Munity was one of the charter clubs in MLS, and Miami Fusion was one of the first expansion teams that joined the league. Due to financial troubles the league faced in those years, both teams had dissolved and ceased operations.

== History ==
The first ever match between the two teams was played on July 8, 2020 during the group stage of the one-off MLS is Back Tournament. The game ended as a 2–1 for Orlando City, with Inter Miami's Juan Agudelo scoring the first ever goal of the rivalry. Orlando City turned around the game with goals from Chris Mueller and Nani. The first three matchups between the teams were played behind closed doors due to the COVID-19 pandemic. The first game that saw a limited number of fans back in stadiums was Inter Miami's 2–1 triumph over Orlando City on October 24, 2020.

On May 25, 2022, Inter Miami and Orlando City played each other in a knockout match for the first time in the round of 16 of the 2022 U.S. Open Cup where Orlando City won 5–3 on penalties after a 1–1 draw. Orlando City went on to win the tournament, becoming only the second Floridian club to win the U.S. Open Cup behind the St. Petersburg Kickers in 1989, and the first in the rivalry to participate in the CONCACAF Champions League the following year.

The clubs faced each other in elimination again, this time for the round of 32 of the 2023 Leagues Cup. Newly-signed Argentine superstar Lionel Messi led Inter Miami to a 3–1 win over Orlando City, coincidentally, Inter Miami went on to win the tournament after defeating Nashville SC 10–9 on penalties in the final on August 19, 2023, becoming the first MLS club to win the competition. On August 27, 2025, the clubs faced each other once more in the Leagues Cup, this time for the semifinals of the 2025 edition where the score ended the exact same 3–1 for Inter Miami, however, Inter Miami ended up losing 3–0 in the final against Seattle Sounders FC.

== Results ==
=== Competitive matches ===
Season	Date	Competition	Stadium	Home team	Result	Away team	Attendance	Series	Ref.
2020	July 8	MLS is Back Tournament	ESPN Wide World of Sports Complex	Orlando City SC	2–1	Inter Miami CF	0	ORL 1–0–0	
2020	August 22	MLS	Inter Miami CF Stadium	Inter Miami CF	3–2	Orlando City SC	0	Tied 1–1–0	
2020	September 12	MLS	Exploria Stadium	Orlando City SC	2–1	Inter Miami CF	0	ORL 2–1–0	
2020	October 24	MLS	Inter Miami CF Stadium	Inter Miami CF	2–1	Orlando City SC	2,216	Tied 2–2–0	
2021	June 25	MLS	DRV PNK Stadium	Inter Miami CF	1–2	Orlando City SC	17,926	ORL 3–2–0	
2021	August 4	MLS	Exploria Stadium	Orlando City SC	1–1	Inter Miami CF	17,966	ORL 3–2–1	
2021	August 27	MLS	Exploria Stadium	Orlando City SC	0–0	Inter Miami CF	17,817	ORL 3–2–2	
2022	May 15	U.S. Open Cup	Exploria Stadium	Orlando City SC	1–1 (a.e.t.) (4–2 p)	Inter Miami CF	11,509	ORL 3–2–3	
2022	July 9	MLS	Exploria Stadium	Orlando City SC	1–0	Inter Miami CF	20,052	ORL 4–2–3	
2022	October 5	MLS	DRV PNK Stadium	Inter Miami CF	4–1	Orlando City SC	15,228	ORL 4–3–3	
2023	May 20	MLS	DRV PNK Stadium	Inter Miami CF	1–3	Orlando City SC	17,643	ORL 5–3–3	
2023	August 2	Leagues Cup	DRV PNK Stadium	Inter Miami CF	3–1	Orlando City SC	20,101	ORL 5–4–3	
2023	September 24	MLS	Exploria Stadium	Orlando City SC	1–1	Inter Miami CF	25,527	ORL 5–4–4	
2024	March 2	MLS	Chase Stadium	Inter Miami CF	5–0	Orlando City SC	21,352	Tied 5–5–4	
2024	May 15	MLS	Inter&Co Stadium	Orlando City SC	0–0	Inter Miami CF	25,046	Tied 5–5–5	
2025	May 18	MLS	Chase Stadium	Inter Miami CF	0–3	Orlando City SC	20,859	ORL 6–5–5	
2025	August 10	MLS	Inter&Co Stadium	Orlando City SC	4–1	Inter Miami CF	25,046	ORL 7–5–5	
2025	August 27	Leagues Cup	Chase Stadium	Inter Miami CF	3–1	Orlando City SC	17,878	ORL 7–6–5	
2026	March 1	MLS	Inter&Co Stadium	Orlando City SC	2–4	Inter Miami CF	24,453	Tied 7–7–5	
2026	May 2	MLS	Nu Stadium	Inter Miami CF	3–4	Orlando City SC	26,684	ORL 8–7–5	

=== Friendlies ===
Date	Stadium	Home team	Result	Away team	Attendance	Ref.
February 14, 2025	Raymond James Stadium	Orlando City SC	2–2	Inter Miami CF	42,017	

=== Eastern Conference standings finishes ===
Miami Orlando

P.	2020	2021	2022	2023	2024	2025	2026
1					1		
2				2			2
3						3	
4	4				4		
5							
6		6	6				
7			7				
8							8
9						9	
10	10						
11		11					
12							
13							
14				14			
15							

== Statistics ==
=== Matches summary ===
As of May 2, 2026

Competition	Matches	Wins		Draws	Goals	
Competition	Matches	MIA	ORL	Draws	MIA	ORL
Major League Soccer	16	5	7	4	27	27
U.S. Open Cup	1	0	0	1	1	1
Leagues Cup	2	2	0	0	6	2
MLS is Back Tournament	1	0	1	0	1	2
All competitions	20	7	8	5	35	32

=== Most appearances ===
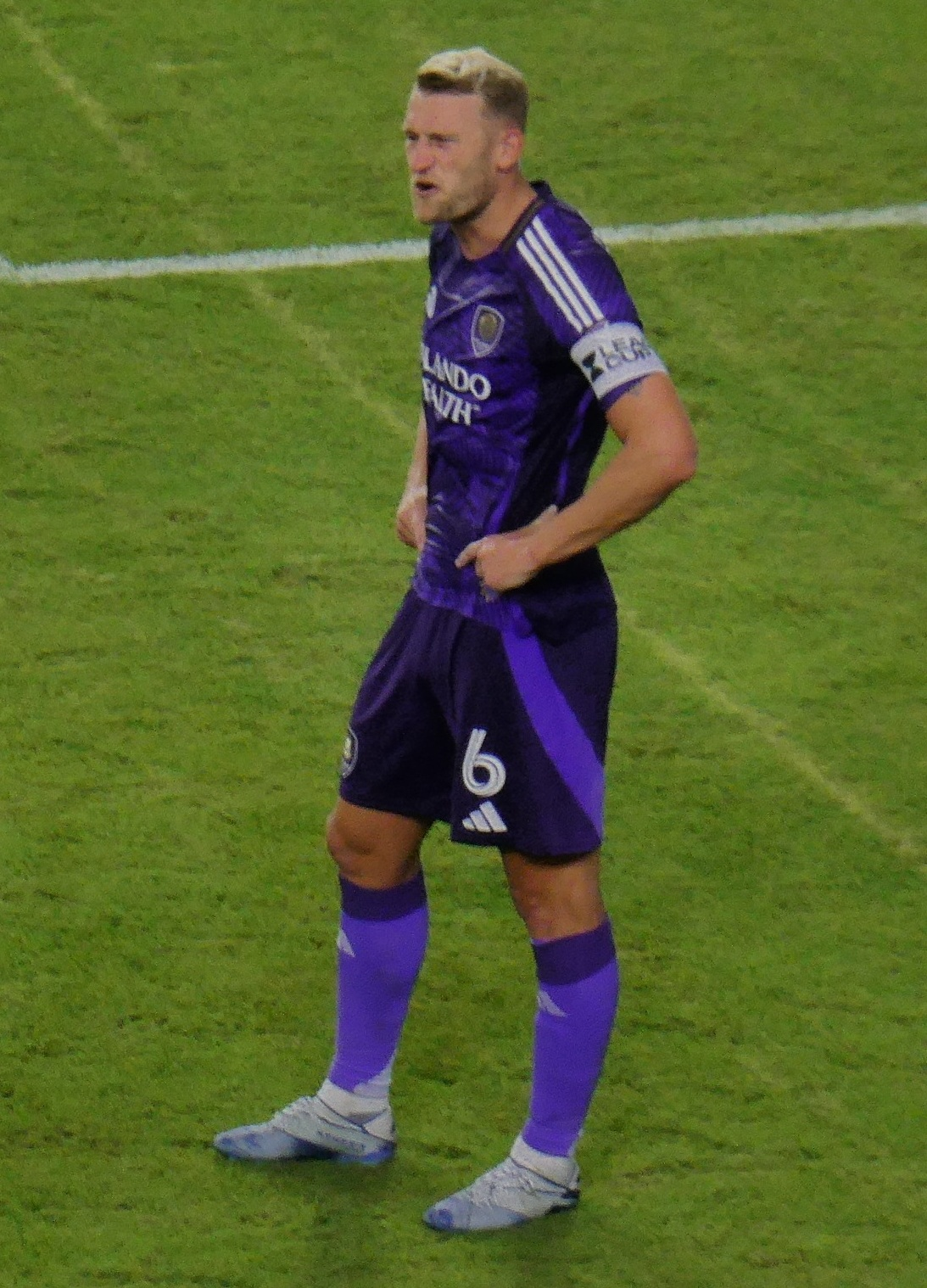
Robin Jansson is the player with the most appearances in the derby.

Players in bold are still active within the rivalry.

As of May 2, 2026

Position	Player	Team	Appearances
1	(Sweden) **Robin Jansson**	Orlando City SC	16
2	(Peru) Pedro Gallese	Orlando City SC	15
3	(Argentina) Rodrigo Schlegel	Orlando City SC	13
4	(Mexico) Víctor Ulloa	Inter Miami CF	12
4	(United States) Kyle Smith	Orlando City SC	12
6	(Colombia) **Iván Angulo**	Orlando City SC	11
6	(Uruguay) César Araújo	Orlando City SC	11
6	(Uruguay) Mauricio Pereyra	Orlando City SC	11
6	(Brazil) Júnior Urso	Orlando City SC	11
10	(Canada) Tesho Akindele	Orlando City SC	10
10	(Brazil) Antônio Carlos	Orlando City SC	10

=== Top goalscorers ===
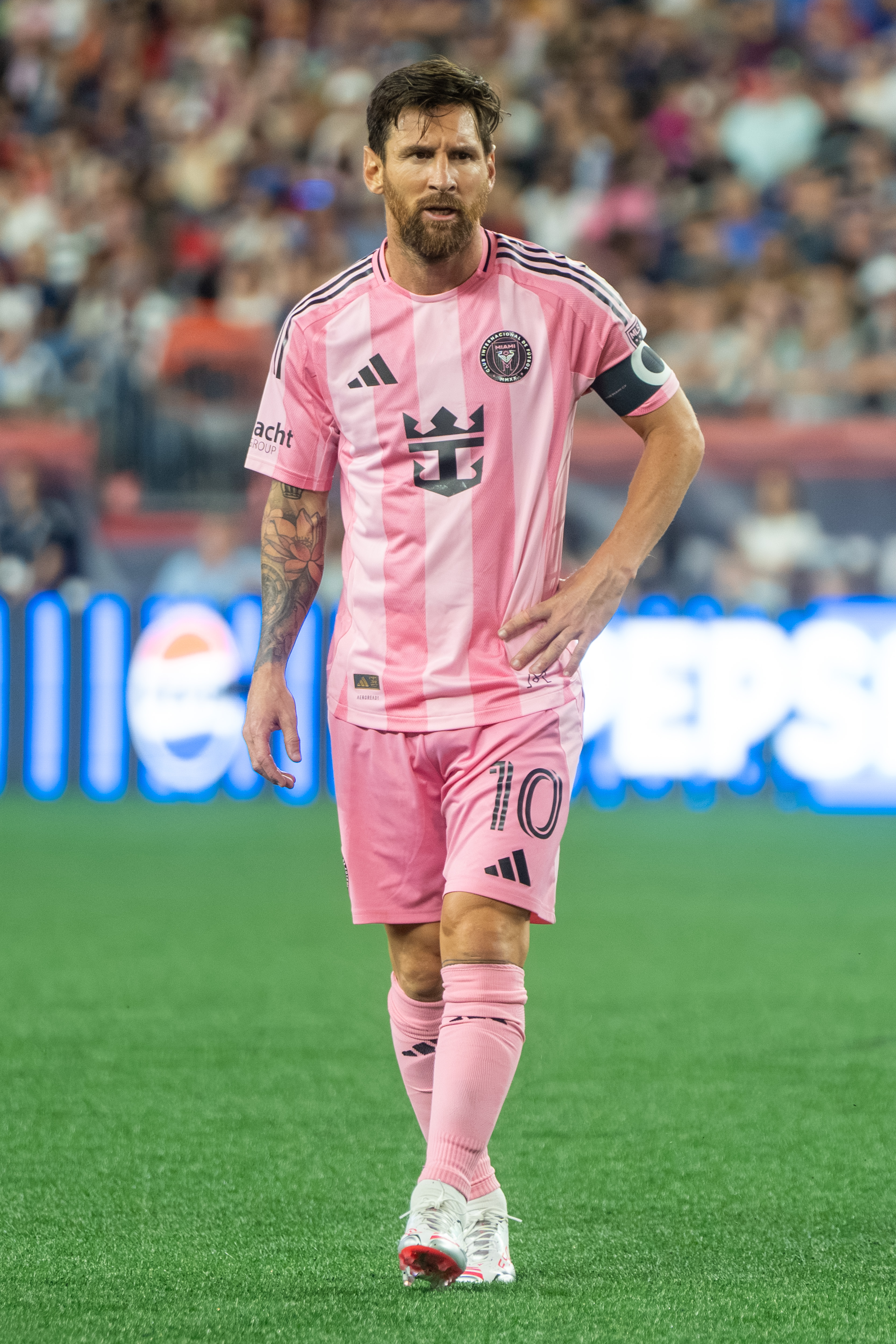
Lionel Messi is the player with the most goals scored with nine.

Players in bold are still active within the rivalry.

As of May 2, 2026

Position	Player	Team	Goals
1	(Argentina) **Lionel Messi**	Inter Miami CF	9
2	(Argentina) **Martín Ojeda**	Orlando City SC	6
3	(Croatia) **Marco Pašalić**	Orlando City SC	4
4	(Argentina) Gonzalo Higuaín	Inter Miami CF	3
4	(Colombia) Luis Muriel	Orlando City SC	3
4	(Portugal) Nani	Orlando City	3
4	(Venezuela) **Telasco Segovia**	Inter Miami CF	3
8	(Ecuador) Leonardo Campana	Inter Miami CF	2
8	(Argentina) Julián Carranza	Inter Miami CF	2
8	(United States) **Daryl Dike**	Orlando City SC	2
8	(Austria) Ercan Kara	Orlando City SC	2
8	(United States) Chris Mueller	Orlando City SC	2
8	(Uruguay) **Luis Suárez**	Inter Miami CF	2

== Honors ==
As of September 16, 2026

Inter Miami CF	Competition	Orlando City SC
—N/a	USL Pro (Player's Shield)	3
—N/a	USL Pro	2
1	Supporters' Shield	0
1	MLS Cup	0
0	U.S. Open Cup	1
1	Leagues Cup	0
1	Campeones Cup	0
4	Total aggregate	6
4	MLS eras total	1

== Players who played for both clubs ==
Player	Inter Miami CF career			Orlando City SC career		
Player	Span	Apps	Goals	Span	Apps	Goals
(United States) Mikey Ambrose	2020	7	1	2016	5	0
(United States) Brek Shea	2020–2022	47	6	2015–2016	47	3
(Canada) Kamal Miller	2023	35	0	2019–2020	30	0

== See also ==
- Buccaneers–Dolphins rivalry
- Heat–Magic rivalry
- Lightning–Panthers rivalry
