= 2026 Orlando City SC season =

Season of an American soccer team

Orlando City SC
2026 season
- Chairman: Mark Wilf
- Manager: Óscar Pareja (until March 11); Martín Perelman (interim, from March 11)
- Stadium: Inter.co Stadium
- MLS: Conference: 8th Overall: 15th
- MLS Cup playoffs: Wild card round
- U.S. Open Cup: Semifinals
- Leagues Cup: League phase
- Top goalscorer: League: Martín Ojeda (16); All: Martín Ojeda (17)
- Highest home attendance: 24,453
- Lowest home attendance: 7,544
- Average home league attendance: 20,090
Home colors	Away colors	Third colors

The 2026 Orlando City SC season is the club's 16th season of existence in Orlando and 12th season as a Major League Soccer franchise, the top-flight league in the United States soccer league system. Orlando played in two other competitions: the U.S. Open Cup and Leagues Cup.

On March 11, 2026, after starting the season with three consecutive losses, Orlando City announced that head coach Óscar Pareja, who had coached the club since December 2019, and the club had agreed to mutually terminate his contract. Pareja was replaced by assistant coach Martín Perelman as interim head coach. Three days later, in Perelman's first match as interim head coach, Orlando City secured its first win of the season with a 2–1 win over CF Montréal. On August 12, Orlando City were eliminated from the league phase of the Leagues Cup. Orlando City advanced to the semifinals of the U.S. Open Cup, but lost 2–1 to the Columbus Crew.

== Roster ==
Last updated on August 27, 2026

=== Current squad ===
No.	Nationality	Name	Position(s)	Date of birth (age)	Previous club	Notes
Goalkeepers
12	(Venezuela)	Javier Otero	GK	November 18, 2002 (age 24)	(United States) Orlando City B	HGP
40	(United States)	Tristan Himes	GK	July 15, 2003 (age 23)	(United States) Orlando City B	HGP
71	(Canada)	Maxime Crépeau	GK	May 11, 1994 (age 32)	(United States) Portland Timbers	–
Defenders
3	(Spain)	Adrián Marín	LB	January 9, 1997 (age 29)	(Portugal) Braga	–
4	(Slovenia)	David Brekalo	CB, LB	December 3, 1998 (age 27)	(Norway) Viking FK	TAM (Note: Targeted allocation money (TAM) players are players whose salary budget is above the maximum salary budget charge ($803,125) and at or below the maximum target allocation money amount ($1,803,125).)
6	(Sweden)	Robin Jansson	CB	November 15, 1991 (age 35)	(Sweden) AIK	SEI
19	(United States)	Zakaria Taifi	RB, CB, DM	October 1, 2005 (age 21)	(United States) Orlando City B	HGP
21	(United States)	Nolan Miller	CB	August 3, 2004 (age 22)	(United States) Michigan Wolverines	–
24	(United States)	Griffin Dorsey	RB, RW	March 5, 1999 (age 27)	(United States) Houston Dynamo	–
27	(Brazil)	Vinícius Nogueira	LB	December 11, 2001 (age 24)	(Bulgaria) Ludogorets Razgrad	on loan
33	(Canada)	Clovis Archange	CB	July 1, 2008 (age 18)	(United States) Orlando City B	HGP
44	(Brazil)	Bernardo Rhein	LB	September 21, 2007 (age 19)	(United States) Orlando City B	HGP
57	(Brazil)	Iago Teodoro	CB	April 18, 2005 (age 21)	(Brazil) Flamengo	U22 (Note: A player who was 22-years-old or younger in their first year they are eligible to play in the league, and may occupy the slot until age 25.), INT (Note: Non-US citizens or permanent residents.)
Midfielders
5	(Brazil)	Luis Otávio	DM	April 12, 2007 (age 19)	(Brazil) Internacional	U22, INT
8	(Paraguay)	Braian Ojeda	CM	June 27, 2000 (age 26)	(United States) Real Salt Lake	TAM
10	(Argentina)	Martín Ojeda	AM, LW, RW	November 27, 1998 (age 27)	(Argentina) Godoy Cruz	DP, INT
16	(Peru)	Wilder Cartagena	DM	September 23, 1994 (age 32)	(United Arab Emirates) Al-Ittihad Kalba	–
20	(Colombia)	Eduard Atuesta	CM, DM	June 18, 1997 (age 29)	(Brazil) Palmeiras	INT, TAM
35	(France)	Joran Gerbet	DM	June 30, 2001 (age 25)	(United States) Clemson Tigers	–
65	(Venezuela)	Gustavo Caraballo	AM, LW, RW	August 29, 2008 (age 18)	(United States) Orlando City B	HGP
Forwards
7	(France)	Antoine Griezmann	AM, FW	March 21, 1991 (age 35)	(Spain) Atlético Madrid	DP, INT
9	(United States)	Daryl Dike	ST	June 3, 2000 (age 26)	(England) West Bromwich Albion	–
11	(Brazil)	Tiago	LW	April 8, 2005 (age 21)	(Brazil) Bahia	U22, INT
14	(Trinidad and Tobago)	Tyrese Spicer	LW, RW	December 4, 2000 (age 25)	(Canada) Toronto FC	INT
22	(United States)	Justin Ellis	CF, AM	May 14, 2007 (age 19)	(United States) Orlando City B	HGP
23	(United States)	Harvey Sarajian	LW, RW, AM	January 26, 2005 (age 21)	(United States) Wake Forest Demon Deacons	–
77	(Colombia)	Iván Angulo	LW	March 22, 1999 (age 27)	(Brazil) Palmeiras	–
87	(Croatia)	Marco Pašalić	RW	September 14, 2000 (age 26)	(Croatia) HNK Rijeka	DP, INT

=== Out on loan ===
No.	Nationality	Name	Position(s)	Date of birth (age)	Current club	Notes
–	(Colombia)	Nicolás Rodríguez	RW, LW	April 25, 2004 (age 22)	(Colombia) Atlético Nacional	Returns December 2026; INT
25	(United States)	Colin Guske	DM	January 29, 2007 (age 19)	(United States) Real Salt Lake	Returns December 2026
34	(Japan)	Yutaro Tsukada	LW	July 28, 2001 (age 25)	(United States) Rhode Island FC	Returns December 2026

== Staff ==
Executive
Majority owner and chairman	(United States) Mark Wilf
Majority owner and vice-chair	(United States) Zygi Wilf
Majority owner and vice-chair	(United States) Leonard Wilf
President of business operations	(United States) Jarrod Dillon
General manager	(Brazil) Luiz Muzzi
Technical director	(Brazil) Ricardo Moreira
Coaching staff
Head coach	(Argentina) Martín Perelman (interim)
Assistant coach	(Argentina) Manuel Goldberg (interim)
Assistant coach	(Argentina) Sebastián Setti (interim)
Strength and conditioning coach	(Brazil) Sandro Graham (interim)
Goalkeeping coach	(Venezuela) César Baena

== Competitions ==
=== Friendlies ===
Orlando City opened preseason camp on January 12. On June 23, Orlando City announced two friendlies ahead of the resumption of the league season following a break for the 2026 FIFA World Cup.

January 24 Friendly	Orlando City SC	1–2	Lexington SC	Kissimmee, Florida
		Report		Stadium: Osceola County Stadium
Note: Closed-door scrimmage

February 7 Friendly	Nashville SC	2–2	Orlando City SC	Palm Beach, Florida
		Report
Note: Closed-door scrimmage; extra 30 minutes played

February 11 Friendly	FC Cincinnati	2–3	Orlando City SC	Tampa, Florida
	Evander 24'; Barlow 77'	Report	49', 50', 53'
Note: Closed-door scrimmage

February 14 Friendly	Orlando City SC	1–4	Colorado Rapids	Orlando, Florida
	Atuesta 61'	Report	Navarro 19', 37'; Yapi 63'; Herrington 79'	Stadium: Inter&Co Stadium
Note: Season ticket member exclusive match

July 8 Friendly	Orlando City SC	6–0	Tampa Bay Rowdies	Orlando, Florida
		Report		Stadium: Inter&Co Stadium
Note: Season ticket member exclusive match

July 15 Friendly	FC Dallas	1–2	Orlando City SC	Mansfield, Texas
		Report		Stadium: Texas Health Mansfield Stadium

=== Major League Soccer ===
MLS is Back opening weekend is scheduled for February 22–23. Regular season play will pause in on May 25 for the 2026 FIFA World Cup and then resume July 16 before the final.

==== League tables ====
===== Eastern Conference =====
MLS Eastern Conference table (2026)
Pos	Team	Pld	W	L	T	GF	GA	GD	Pts	Qualification
6	Philadelphia Union	34	14	12	8	66	52	+14	50	Qualification for round one
7	Columbus Crew	34	14	15	5	59	52	+7	47	Qualification for round one
8	Orlando City SC	34	13	14	7	63	78	−15	46	Qualification for the wild card round
9	FC Cincinnati	34	12	12	10	67	75	−8	46	Qualification for the wild card round
10	New York Red Bulls	34	12	16	6	48	62	−14	42	

Source: MLS
Rules for classification: 1) points; 2) total wins; 3) total goal differential; 4) total goals scored; 5) fewer disciplinary points; 6) away goal differential; 7) away goals scored; 8) home goals differential; 9) home goals scored; 10) coin toss (2 clubs tied) or drawing of lots (≥3 clubs tied)

===== Overall =====
Overall MLS standings table
Pos	Team	Pld	W	L	T	GF	GA	GD	Pts
13	Los Angeles FC	34	12	11	11	52	40	+12	47
14	Portland Timbers	34	13	14	7	62	61	+1	46
15	Orlando City SC	34	13	14	7	63	78	−15	46
16	Seattle Sounders FC	34	12	12	10	44	46	−2	46
17	FC Cincinnati	34	12	12	10	67	75	−8	46

Source: MLS
Rules for classification: 1) points; 2) total wins; 3) total goal differential; 4) total goals scored; 5) fewer disciplinary points; 6) away goal differential; 7) away goals scored; 8) home goals differential; 9) home goals scored; 10) coin toss (2 clubs tied) or drawing of lots (≥3 clubs tied)

==== Results summary ====
Overall								Home						Away					
Pld	W	D	L	GF	GA	GD	Pts	W	D	L	GF	GA	GD	W	D	L	GF	GA	GD
34	13	7	14	63	78	−15	46	10	3	4	33	22	+11	3	4	10	30	56	−26

Source: Match reports

==== Results by matchday ====
Round	1	2	3	4	5	6	7	8	9	10	11	12	13	14	15	16	17	18	19	20	21	22	23	24	25	26	27	28	29	30	31	32	33	34
Stadium	H	H	A	H	A	A	A	H	H	A	A	A	H	H	A	A	H	A	H	H	H	A	H	A	H	A	A	H	A	H	H	A	A	H
Result	L	L	L	W	L	L	D	L	W	L	W	L	W	D	L	W	W	L	D	L	W	D	W	W	W	L	L	W	D	W	D	D	L	W
Position (Note: ORL's position at the end of the matchweek, not their match.)	8	10	15	13	13	14	13	15	12	14	13	14	12	10	12	10	10	10	10	10	9	9	8	6	6	7	7	7	7	7	7	7	9	8
Points	0	0	0	3	3	3	4	4	7	7	10	10	13	14	14	17	20	20	21	21	24	25	28	31	34	34	34	37	38	41	42	43	43	46

Updated to match(es) played on November 7, 2026. Source: Match reports
A = Away; H = Home; W = Win; D = Draw; L = Loss

==== Results ====
February 21 1	Orlando City SC	1–2	New York Red Bulls	Orlando, Florida
7:30 pm	Spicer (yellow card) 45+2'; Tiago 90+6'	Report	Hall 8', 40'; Che (yellow card) 49'; Mehmeti (yellow card) 63'	Stadium: Inter&Co Stadium; Attendance: 24,453; Referee: Rubiel Vazquez

March 1 2	Orlando City SC	2–4	Inter Miami CF	Orlando, Florida
7:00 pm	Pašalić 18', (yellow card) 74'; M. Ojeda 24'; Guske (yellow card) 45' (yellow-red card) 88'; Miller (yellow card) 45+4'; Dorsey (yellow card) 71'	Report	Allende (yellow card) 45+4'; Silvetti 49'; Messi 57', 90'; Segovia 85', (yellow card) 90+4'; De Paul (yellow card) 90+8'	Stadium: Inter&Co Stadium; Attendance: 24,453; Referee: Ismail Elfath

March 7 3	New York City FC	5–0	Orlando City SC	New York, New York
2:30 pm	A. Ojeda 21'; Fernández 42'; Moralez 45+7' (pen.); Parks 49', 54'	Report	Reid-Brown (yellow card) 7'; Crépeau (red card) 16'	Stadium: Yankee Stadium; Attendance: 25,055; Referee: Guido Gonzales Jr.

March 14 4	Orlando City SC	2–1	CF Montréal	Orlando, Florida
7:30 pm	McGuire 19'; M. Ojeda 31'; Atuesta (yellow card) 33'	Report	Owusu 24'	Stadium: Inter&Co Stadium; Attendance: 18,035; Referee: Jair Marrufo

March 21 5	Nashville SC	5–0	Orlando City SC	Nashville, Tennessee
6:00 pm	Espinoza 5'; Surridge 28' (pen.), 55', 67'; Madrigal 80'; Najar (yellow card) 83'	Report	Miller (yellow card) 26'; Iago (yellow card) 73'	Stadium: Geodis Park; Attendance: 27,167; Referee: Victor Rivas

April 4 6	Los Angeles FC	6–0	Orlando City SC	Los Angeles, California
9:30 pm	Brekalo 7' (o.g.); Bounga 20', 23', 28'; Palencia 39'; Boyd 70'; Martínez (yellow card) 79'	Report	Atuesta (yellow card) 21'; McGuire (yellow card) 66'; Angulo (yellow card) 84'	Stadium: BMO Stadium; Attendance: 22,185; Referee: Alexis Da Silva

April 12 7	Columbus Crew	1–1	Orlando City SC	Columbus, Ohio
7:00 pm	Moreira (yellow card) 55'; Rossi 80'	Report	Pašalić 14', (yellow card) 86'; Iago (yellow card) 41'; Brekalo (yellow card) 43'; Marín (yellow card) 82'	Stadium: ScottsMiracle-Gro Field; Attendance: 19,834; Referee: Ricardo Montero

April 18 8	Orlando City SC	0–1	Houston Dynamo FC	Orlando, Florida
7:30 pm	Atuesta (yellow card) 18'; B. Ojeda (yellow card) 90+6'	Report	Andrade (yellow card) 28'; Herrera 75'; Maurer (yellow card) 78'	Stadium: Inter&Co Stadium; Attendance: 19,243; Referee: Pierre-Luc Lauziere

April 22 9	Orlando City SC	4–1	Charlotte FC	Orlando, Florida
7:30 pm	Otávio 21', (yellow card) 41'; Angulo (yellow card) 24'; M. Ojeda (yellow card) 45+3', (goal) 49', 61'; Tiago (yellow card) 66'; Gómez (yellow card) 79', (goal) 87'	Report	Agyemang 33'; Westwood (yellow card) 41'; Toffolo (yellow card) 59'	Stadium: Inter&Co Stadium; Attendance: 16,089; Referee: Filip Dujic

April 25 10	D.C. United	3–2	Orlando City SC	Washington, D.C.
7:00 pm	Hopkins 10'; Bartlett (yellow card) 21'; Munteanu 84'; Rowles 90'; Stroud (yellow card) 90+2'; Kurokawa (yellow card) 90+4'	Report	Iago (yellow card) 4'; Ellis 57'; Spicer 67'; Otávio (yellow card) 74'; Cartagena (yellow card) 90+8'	Stadium: Audi Field; Attendance: 14,040; Referee: Chris Penso

May 2 11	Inter Miami CF	3–4	Orlando City SC	Miami, Florida
7:00 pm	Fray 4'; Segovia 25'; Messi 33', (yellow card) 78'; Falcón (yellow card) 45+4'; St. Clair (yellow card) 45+5'; Bright (yellow card) 52'; De Paul (yellow card) 59'	Report	Jansson (yellow card) 18'; Marín (yellow card) 36'; M. Ojeda 39', 68', 79' (pen.); Spicer 90+3'; Crépeau (yellow card) 90+6'	Stadium: Nu Stadium; Attendance: 26,684; Referee: Guido Gonzales Jr.

May 9 12	CF Montréal	2–0	Orlando City SC	Montreal, Quebec
4:30 pm	Ríos 90+4' (pen.); Þórhallsson 90+8'	Report	Atuesta (yellow card) 62'; Iago (yellow card) 90+6'	Stadium: Saputo Stadium; Attendance: 14,044; Referee: Marcos de Oliveira

May 13 13	Orlando City SC	4–3	Philadelphia Union	Orlando, Florida
7:30 pm	M. Ojeda 19' (pen.), 90'; Dorsey 27'; Tiago (yellow card) 51'; McGuire 72'	Report	Rick (yellow card) 17'; Iloski 54'; Jean Jacques (yellow card) 59'; Rafanello (yellow card) 60'; C. Sullivan 75'; Bender 79'	Stadium: Inter&Co Stadium; Attendance: 15,656; Referee: Serhiy Boyko

May 16 14	Orlando City SC	1–1	Atlanta United FC	Orlando, Florida
7:30 pm	Dorsey 18'; Pašalić (yellow card) 28'; Crépeau (yellow card) 85'	Report	Reilly (yellow card) 41'; Fortune 86'	Stadium: Inter&Co Stadium; Attendance: 20,074; Referee: Tori Penso

May 23 15	FC Cincinnati	6–2	Orlando City SC	Cincinnati, Ohio
7:30 pm	Valenzuela (yellow card) 32'; Mboma Dem 42', 52'; Evander 45+3', 58'; Miazga (yellow card) 47'; Denkey 77'; Barlow 90+1'	Report	Marín (yellow card) 10'; M. Ojeda 16' (pen.), 48'; Tiago (yellow card) 41'; Brekalo (yellow card) 70'	Stadium: TQL Stadium; Attendance: 25,513; Referee: Rubiel Vazquez

July 22 16	San Jose Earthquakes	0–4	Orlando City SC	San Jose, California
10:30 pm	Werner (yellow card) 45+1'; Vieira (yellow card) 52'; Judd (yellow card) 67'; Munie (yellow card) 90+4'	Report	Brekalo 7'; Angulo 29'; Atuesta (yellow card) 36'; Griezmann 48'; B. Ojeda 73'; Sarajian (yellow card) 81'	Stadium: PayPal Park; Attendance: 16,211; Referee: Elijio Arreguin

July 25 17	Orlando City SC	1–0	Nashville SC	Orlando, Florida
7:30 pm	Tiago (yellow card) 20'; Spicer 72'	Report		Stadium: Inter.co Stadium; Attendance: 24,453; Referee: Ramy Touchan

August 1 18	New York Red Bulls	3–2	Orlando City SC	Harrison, New Jersey
10:30 pm	Jiménez 23', 60'; Nealis (yellow card) 27'; Forsberg 43'; Che (yellow card) 59'; Marshall-Rutty (yellow card) 90+6'	Report	Spicer 52'; Dorsey 63'; Angulo (yellow card) 69'; Sarajian (yellow card) 88'	Stadium: Sports Illustrated Stadium; Attendance: 22,104; Referee: Filip Dujic

August 15 19	Orlando City SC	1–1	FC Cincinnati	Orlando, Florida
7:30 pm	Jansson (yellow card) 29'; Spicer 48'	Report	Bucha 23'; Evander (yellow card) 55'; Miazga (yellow card) 85'	Stadium: Inter.co Stadium; Attendance: 19,015; Referee: Tori Penso

August 19 20	Orlando City SC	1–2	Chicago Fire FC	Orlando, Florida
7:30 pm	Brekalo 52'; Otávio (yellow card) 57'; Jansson (yellow card) 66'	Report	Dithejane 4'; Lewandowski 68' (pen.); Radojević (yellow card) 80'; Rogers (yellow card) 89'	Stadium: Inter.co Stadium; Attendance: 20,102; Referee: Rosendo Mendoza

August 22 21	Orlando City SC	2–1	Real Salt Lake	Orlando, Florida
7:30 pm	Griezmann 53', 81'; Atuesta (yellow card) 83'	Report	Marczuk 36'; Rodrigues (yellow card) 43'; Katranis (yellow card) 45+4'; Henry (yellow card) 71'	Stadium: Inter.co Stadium; Attendance: 17,612; Referee: Fotis Bazakos

August 29 22	Minnesota United FC	3–3	Orlando City SC	Saint Paul, Minnesota
8:30 pm	Markanich (yellow card) 30', (goal) 74'; Boxall (yellow card) 66'; Caldeira 71'; Yeboah 75'	Report	Dike 28'; Griezmann (yellow card) 54', (goal) 64'; Pašalić (yellow card) 90+2'; Spicer 90+3'	Stadium: Allianz Field; Attendance: 19,352; Referee: Allen Chapman

September 5 23	Orlando City SC	1–0	San Diego FC	Orlando, Florida
7:30 pm	Griezmann 28'; Otávio (yellow card) 85'; Brekalo (yellow card) 90+8'; Angulo (yellow card) 90+9'	Report	Vazquez (yellow card) 84'; Sargeant (yellow card) 90+4'	Stadium: Inter.co Stadium; Attendance: 19,007; Referee: Joe Dickerson

September 9 24	Atlanta United FC	2–3	Orlando City SC	Atlanta, Georgia
7:30 pm	Brekalo 7' (o.g.); Jacob (yellow card) 67'; Spicer 90+7' (o.g.)	Report	Griezmann 26', 77'; Brekalo (yellow card) 42'; Angulo 58'; Ellis (yellow card) 88'	Stadium: Mercedes-Benz Stadium; Attendance: 33,025; Referee: Armando Villarreal

September 12 25	Orlando City SC	3–0	Toronto FC	Orlando, Florida
7:30 pm	Otávio (yellow card) 20'; Gerbet (yellow card) 27'; Griezmann 45+1'; Sarajian 82'; Iago (yellow card) 90+1'; Angulo 90+6'	Report	Etienne Jr. (yellow card) 54'; Coello (yellow card) 60'	Stadium: Inter.co Stadium; Attendance: 19,617; Referee: Jon Freemon

September 19 26	New England Revolution	4–2	Orlando City SC	Foxborough, Massachusetts
7:30 pm	Gil 19', 90+6'; Raines (yellow card) 14'; Sands (yellow card) 47'; Miller 59', 90+3'; Feingold (yellow card) 80'	Report	Angulo 62'; M. Ojeda 88' (pen.)	Stadium: Gillette Stadium; Attendance: 26,100; Referee: Serhiy Boyko

September 26 27	Philadelphia Union	4–2	Orlando City SC	Chester, Pennsylvania
7:30 pm	Iloski 11' (pen.), 19', 51'; Vassilev 47'; Q. Sullivan (yellow card) 63'; Sery Larsen (yellow card) 77'	Report	Atuesta (yellow card) 11'; Iago (yellow card) 37'; Gerbet (yellow card) 43'; Angulo 78', (yellow card) 84'; M. Ojeda 90'	Stadium: Subaru Park; Attendance: 18,504; Referee: Sergii Demianchuk

October 10 28	Orlando City SC	3–2	Columbus Crew	Orlando, Florida
7:30 pm	Sarajian 1'; Nogueira (yellow card) 3'; Griezmann 16'; Jansson (yellow card) 23'; Brekalo (yellow card) 42'; Angulo 89'	Report	Habroune 8', (yellow card) 21'; Méndez (yellow card) 36', (goal) 53'	Stadium: Inter.co Stadium; Attendance: 20,018; Referee: Rosendo Mendoza

October 14 29	Toronto FC	3–3	Orlando City SC	Toronto, Ontario
7:30 pm	Morgan 27'; Corbeanu 49'; Coello (yellow card) 66'; Kuscevic (yellow card) 76'; Pereira 90'; Laryea (yellow card) 90+5'	Report	M. Ojeda 45+1' (pen.); Griezmann 77'; Nogueira (yellow card) 82'; Dike 83'	Stadium: BMO Field; Attendance: 17,303; Referee: Armando Villarreal

October 17 30	Orlando City SC	4–1	D.C. United	Orlando, Florida
7:30 pm	Griezmann 15', 50'; M. Ojeda 22'; Otávio (yellow card) 38'; Pašalić 90+5'	Report	Baribo 45+2' (pen.), (yellow card) 88'; Nono (yellow card) 77'; Hopkins (yellow card) 82'	Stadium: Inter.co Stadium; Attendance: 19,661; Referee: Pierre-Luc Lauzière

October 24 31	Orlando City SC	2–2	New York City FC	Orlando, Florida
7:30 pm	Griezmann 32'; Nogueira (yellow card) 38'; M. Ojeda 49'; Iago (yellow card) 63'; Cartagena (yellow card) 78'; Atuesta (yellow card) 86'	Report	Martínez 18'; Sands (yellow card) 44'; Shore 90+10'	Stadium: Inter.co Stadium; Attendance: 21,525; Referee: Elijio Arreguin

October 28 32	Chicago Fire FC	2–2	Orlando City SC	Chicago, Illinois
8:30 pm	Oregel (yellow card) 30'; Elliott (yellow card) 45'; Bamba 57'; Haile-Selassie 69'	Report	Angulo 6'; Griezmann 35'; Ellis (yellow card) 45+2'; Brekalo (yellow card) 76'	Stadium: Soldier Field; Attendance: 25,841; Referee: Marcos de Oliveira

October 31 33	Charlotte FC	4–0	Orlando City SC	Charlotte, North Carolina
1:00 pm	Kessler 6'; Saint-Maximin 49', (red card) 89'; Westwood (yellow card) 61'; Doucouré 84'; Smalls (yellow card) 90+3'; Aloko 90+4'	Report	Iago (yellow card) 25'; Angulo (yellow card) 82'	Stadium: Bank of America Stadium; Attendance: 28,538; Referee: Victor Rivas

November 7 34	Orlando City SC	1–0	New England Revolution	Orlando, Florida
4:00 pm	B. Ojeda 45'; Crépeau (yellow card) 90+1'	Report		Stadium: Inter.co Stadium; Attendance: 22,509; Referee: Guido Gonzales Jr.

=== MLS Cup playoffs ===
November 19 Wild card	Orlando City SC	1–3	FC Cincinnati	Orlando, Florida
7:30 pm EST	M. Ojeda 26'; Dike (yellow card) 78'; Marín (yellow card) 90+2'	Report	Evander 43' (pen.), 50'; Barlow (yellow card) 51'; Bucha (yellow card) 60'; Nwobodo (yellow card) 63'; Martínez (yellow card) 76'; Gidi 85'	Stadium: Inter.co Stadium; Attendance: 17,147; Referee: Rubiel Vazquez

=== U.S. Open Cup ===
Orlando qualified as one of the teams not entering another cup competition who ranked highest in the previous season's Supporters' Shield standings (excluding Canadian teams), and those competing in CONCACAF Champions Cup. Orlando City entered the tournament in the Round of 32 and were drawn against USL League One club FC Naples. Orlando City defeated FC Naples 1–0 and advanced to the Round of 16, where they were drawn away to fellow Major League Soccer side New England Revolution. After defeating the New England Revolution, Orlando City were drawn against Atlanta United FC. Orlando City comfortably defeated Atlanta United 4–1, and faced Columbus Crew on September 16, 2026, who they lost 2–1 to and were eliminated from the tournament by.

April 15 Round of 32	FC Naples (Florida)	0–1	(Florida) Orlando City SC	Collier County, Florida
7:00 pm	Garcia (yellow card) 71'	Report	Spicer 18'; Brekalo (yellow card) 40'; Ellis (yellow card) 90+7'; Guske (yellow card) 90+8'	Stadium: Paradise Coast Sports Complex; Attendance: 4,782; Referee: Elvis Osmanovic

April 29 Round of 16	New England Revolution (Massachusetts)	3–4	(Florida) Orlando City SC	Pawtucket, Rhode Island
7:30 pm	Fry 21'; Farrell 38'; Zambrano 58'; Fagúndez (yellow card) 78'; Oyirwoth (yellow card) 88'	Report	Guske (yellow card) 1'; Iago 31'; Dorsey 40'; Gómez (yellow card) 41'; Ellis 70'; Taifi 90+2'	Stadium: Centreville Bank Stadium; Referee: Abdou Ndiaye

May 19 Quarterfinals	Orlando City SC (Florida)	4–1	(Georgia (U.S. state)) Atlanta United FC	Orlando, Florida
7:30 pm	Brekalo 5'; Dorsey 16'; Tiago 24', 45+5'; Cartagena (yellow card) 90+2'	Report	Gregersen (yellow card) 45+4'; Sanchez (yellow card) 64'; Muyumba (yellow card) 67'; Latte Lath 84'; Amador (yellow card) 89'; Santos (yellow card) 90+2'	Stadium: Inter&Co Stadium; Attendance: 14,254; Referee: Lorenzo Hernandez

September 16 Semifinals	Columbus Crew (Ohio)	2–1	(Florida) Orlando City SC	Columbus, Ohio
7:00 pm	Martínez 9'; Habroune (yellow card) 48'; Méndez 52'	Report	M. Ojeda 40'; Cartagena (yellow card) 75'	Stadium: ScottsMiracle-Gro Field; Referee: Joe Dickerson

=== Leagues Cup ===
The 2026 Leagues Cup will be played from August 4 to September 6 with all of Orlando City's phase one matches being played at Inter.co Stadium. On March 5, Orlando City's schedule and opponents were announced, with Orlando City facing Monterrey, León, and Atlético San Luis in phase one. Orlando City were eliminated during the league phase.

August 5 1	Monterrey (Mexico)	1–2	(United States) Orlando City SC	Orlando, Florida
7:30 pm	Orellano (yellow card) 21'; J. Rodríguez (yellow card) 34'; De la Rosa (yellow card) 34'; Reyes (yellow card) 53'; Cárdenas (yellow card) 57'; Cuypers 90+9'	Report	Griezmann 28'; Brekalo (yellow card) 45+3'; Crépeau (yellow card) 49'; Spicer 60' (pen.); Cartagena (yellow card) 73'	Stadium: Inter.co Stadium; Attendance: 16,603; Referee: Adonai Escobedo

August 8 2	Orlando City SC (United States)	1–2	(Mexico) León	Orlando, Florida
6:30 pm	Rhein (yellow card) 21'; Pašalić 38'; Cartagena (yellow card) 59'	Report	Romaña (yellow card) 19'; Guevara 54'; Arcila 72'; Vegas (yellow card) 90+5'	Stadium: Inter.co Stadium; Attendance: 12,021; Referee: Jose Espinoza

August 12 3	Orlando City SC (United States)	2–2 (5–3 p)	(Mexico) Atlético San Luis	Orlando, Florida
7:30 pm	Cartagena (yellow card) 17'; Dike 31'; Iago (yellow card) 35'; Ellis 69'; Otero (yellow card) 90+7'	Report	Duarte (yellow card) 15'; Caicedo (yellow card) 40'; Pérez Bouquet 79'; Galdames (yellow card) 87'; Rodríguez 90+7'	Stadium: Inter.co Stadium; Attendance: 7,544; Referee: Katia García
	Penalties
	Griezmann (penalty scored); Ellis (penalty scored); Caraballo (penalty scored); Iago (penalty scored); Marín (penalty scored)		(penalty scored) Salles-Lamonge; (penalty scored) Mora; (penalty scored) Galdames; (penalty missed) Cruz

== Squad statistics ==
=== Appearances ===
As of match played November 19, 2026

Starting appearances are listed first, followed by substitute appearances after the + symbol where applicable.

No.	Pos	Nat	Player	Total		MLS		Open Cup		Leagues Cup		Playoffs	
No.	Pos	Nat	Player	Apps	Goals	Apps	Goals	Apps	Goals	Apps	Goals	Apps	Goals
Goalkeepers
12	GK	(Venezuela) VEN	Javier Otero	6	0	1+1	0	3+0	0	1+0	0	0	0
40	GK	(United States) USA	Tristan Himes	0	0	0	0	0	0	0	0	0	0
71	GK	(Canada) CAN	Maxime Crépeau	37	0	33+0	0	1+0	0	2+0	0	1	0
Defenders
3	DF	(Spain) ESP	Adrián Marín	28	0	13+10	0	3+0	0	1+0	0	0+1	0
4	DF	(Slovenia) SLO	David Brekalo	34	3	28+1	2	3+0	1	1+0	0	1	0
6	DF	(Sweden) SWE	Robin Jansson	26	0	21+0	0	2+1	0	2+0	0	0	0
19	DF	(United States) USA	Zakaria Taifi	33	1	11+15	0	2+2	1	2+1	0	0	0
21	DF	(United States) USA	Nolan Miller	6	0	4+1	0	1+0	0	0	0	0	0
24	DF	(United States) USA	Griffin Dorsey	27	5	20+2	3	2+0	2	1+1	0	1	0
27	DF	(Brazil) BRA	Vinícius Nogueira	8	0	6+1	0	0	0	0	0	1	0
33	DF	(Canada) CAN	Clovis Archange	1	0	0	0	0	0	0	0	1	0
44	DF	(Brazil) BRA	Bernardo Rhein	15	0	6+5	0	1+0	0	2+0	0	1	0
57	DF	(Brazil) BRA	Iago Teodoro	26	1	18+4	0	1+0	1	2+0	0	1	0
Midfielders
5	MF	(Brazil) BRA	Luis Otávio	32	1	15+11	1	1+2	0	2+0	0	1	0
8	MF	(Paraguay) PAR	Braian Ojeda	27	2	22+2	2	3+0	0	0	0	0	0
10	MF	(Argentina) ARG	Martín Ojeda	33	18	26+2	16	3+1	1	0	0	1	1
16	MF	(Peru) PER	Wilder Cartagena	23	0	8+10	0	0+2	0	2+1	0	0	0
20	MF	(Colombia) COL	Eduard Atuesta	31	0	20+6	0	2+1	0	1+0	0	1	0
35	MF	(France) FRA	Joran Gerbet	15	0	7+4	0	1+0	0	0+2	0	0+1	0
65	MF	(Venezuela) VEN	Gustavo Caraballo	1	0	0	0	0	0	0+1	0	0	0
Forwards
7	FW	(France) FRA	Antoine Griezmann	23	15	18+0	14	1+0	0	2+1	1	1	0
9	FW	(United States) USA	Daryl Dike	20	3	4+11	2	0+1	0	1+2	1	0+1	0
11	FW	(Brazil) BRA	Tiago	25	3	13+8	1	2+1	2	1+0	0	0	0
14	FW	(Trinidad and Tobago) TTO	Tyrese Spicer	27	8	8+14	6	1+2	1	2+0	1	0	0
22	FW	(United States) USA	Justin Ellis	32	3	18+6	1	4+0	1	1+2	1	0+1	0
23	FW	(United States) USA	Harvey Sarajian	14	2	2+10	2	0	0	1+1	0	0	0
77	FW	(Colombia) COL	Iván Angulo	41	7	33+1	7	3+1	0	2+0	0	1	0
87	FW	(Croatia) CRO	Marco Pašalić	30	4	14+10	3	0+2	0	2+1	1	1	0
Reserves
38	MF	(Ghana) GHA	Issah Haruna	1	0	0	0	0	0	0+1	0	0	0
Player(s) who featured but departed the club permanently or on loan during the season:
13	FW	(United States) USA	Duncan McGuire	12	2	4+7	2	0+1	0	0	0	0	0
25	MF	(United States) USA	Colin Guske	9	0	2+4	0	1+1	0	1+0	0	0	0
29	DF	(United States) USA	Tahir Reid-Brown	9	0	2+5	0	1+1	0	0	0	0	0
34	FW	(Japan) JPN	Yutaro Tsukada	3	0	0+2	0	1+0	0	0	0	0	0
80	MF	(Argentina) ARG	Ignacio Gómez (Note: Reserve player from Orlando City B)	4	1	0+2	1	1+0	0	1+0	0	0	0
90	FW	(Brazil) BRA	Pedro Leão (Note: Reserve player from Orlando City B)	1	0	0+1	0	0	0	0	0	0	0

=== Discipline ===
As of match played November 19, 2026

Rank	No.	Pos.	Player	MLS			Open Cup			Leagues Cup			Playoffs			Total		
Rank	No.	Pos.	Player	Yellow card	(yellow card) (yellow-red card)	Red card	Yellow card	(yellow card) (yellow-red card)	Red card	Yellow card	(yellow card) (yellow-red card)	Red card	Yellow card	(yellow card) (yellow-red card)	Red card	Yellow card	(yellow card) (yellow-red card)	Red card
1	20	MF	(Colombia) Eduard Atuesta	8	0	0	0	0	0	0	0	0	0	0	0	8	0	0
1	4	DF	(Slovenia) David Brekalo	6	0	0	1	0	0	1	0	0	0	0	0	8	0	0
1	57	DF	(Brazil) Iago Teodoro	7	0	0	0	0	0	1	0	0	0	0	0	8	0	0
4	77	FW	(Colombia) Iván Angulo	6	0	0	0	0	0	0	0	0	1	0	0	7	0	0
4	16	MF	(Peru) Wilder Cartagena	2	0	0	2	0	0	3	0	0	0	0	0	7	0	0
6	5	MF	(Brazil) Luis Otávio	6	0	0	0	0	0	0	0	0	0	0	0	6	0	0
7	71	GK	(Canada) Maxime Crépeau	3	0	1	0	0	0	1	0	0	0	0	0	5	0	1
8	25	MF	(United States) Colin Guske	2	1	0	2	0	0	0	0	0	0	0	0	4	1	0
8	6	DF	(Sweden) Robin Jansson	4	0	0	0	0	0	0	0	0	0	0	0	4	0	0
8	87	FW	(Croatia) Marco Pašalić	4	0	0	0	0	0	0	0	0	0	0	0	4	0	0
8	11	FW	(Brazil) Tiago	4	0	0	0	0	0	0	0	0	0	0	0	4	0	0
12	22	FW	(United States) Justin Ellis	2	0	0	1	0	0	0	0	0	0	0	0	3	0	0
12	3	DF	(Spain) Adrián Marín	3	0	0	0	0	0	0	0	0	0	0	0	3	0	0
14	35	MF	(France) Joran Gerbet	2	0	0	0	0	0	0	0	0	0	0	0	2	0	0
14	80	MF	(Argentina) Ignacio Gómez	1	0	0	1	0	0	0	0	0	0	0	0	2	0	0
14	21	DF	(United States) Nolan Miller	2	0	0	0	0	0	0	0	0	0	0	0	2	0	0
14	27	DF	(Brazil) Vinícius Nogueira	2	0	0	0	0	0	0	0	0	0	0	0	2	0	0
14	23	FW	(United States) Harvey Sarajian	2	0	0	0	0	0	0	0	0	0	0	0	2	0	0
19	9	FW	(United States) Daryl Dike	0	0	0	0	0	0	0	0	0	1	0	0	1	0	0
19	24	DF	(United States) Griffin Dorsey	1	0	0	0	0	0	0	0	0	0	0	0	1	0	0
19	7	FW	(France) Antoine Griezmann	1	0	0	0	0	0	0	0	0	0	0	0	1	0	0
19	13	FW	(United States) Duncan McGuire	1	0	0	0	0	0	0	0	0	0	0	0	1	0	0
19	8	MF	(Paraguay) Braian Ojeda	1	0	0	0	0	0	0	0	0	0	0	0	1	0	0
19	10	MF	(Argentina) Martín Ojeda	1	0	0	0	0	0	0	0	0	0	0	0	1	0	0
19	12	GK	(Venezuela) Javier Otero	0	0	0	0	0	0	1	0	0	0	0	0	1	0	0
19	29	DF	(United States) Tahir Reid-Brown	1	0	0	0	0	0	0	0	0	0	0	0	1	0	0
19	44	DF	(Brazil) Bernardo Rhein	0	0	0	0	0	0	1	0	0	0	0	0	1	0	0
19	14	FW	(Trinidad and Tobago) Tyrese Spicer	1	0	0	0	0	0	0	0	0	0	0	0	1	0	0
Total				75	1	1	7	0	0	8	0	0	2	0	0	92	1	1

== Player movement ==
Per Major League Soccer and club policies, terms of the deals do not get disclosed.

=== MLS SuperDraft picks ===
Draft picks are not automatically signed to the team roster. The 2026 MLS SuperDraft was held on December 18, 2025. Orlando made five selections.

2026 Orlando City MLS SuperDraft Picks
Round	Selection	Player	Position	College	Status
1	5	(United States) Harvey Sarajian	FW	(North Carolina) Wake Forest Demon Deacons	Signed
1	9	(United States) Nolan Miller	DF	Michigan Wolverines	Signed
1	14	(Trinidad and Tobago) Jaylen Yearwood	DF	North Florida Ospreys	Signed with Orlando City B
1	20	(Ghana) Issah Haruna	MF	(North Carolina) UNC Greensboro Spartans	Signed with Orlando City B
3	74	(United States) Mitch Ferguson	DF	(Louisiana) Notre Dame Fighting Irish	Signed with Sporting Kansas City II

=== Transfers in ===
No.	Name	Pos.	Transferred from	Fee/notes	Date	Ref.
11	(Brazil) Tiago	LW	(Brazil) Bahia	Undisclosed fee, reportedly $6m; signed U-22 contract	December 19, 2025	
5	(Brazil) Luis Otávio	DM	(Brazil) Internacional	Undisclosed fee, reportedly $3.2m; signed U-22 contract	December 26, 2025	
8	(Paraguay) Braian Ojeda	CM	(United States) Real Salt Lake	$1.3m in general allocation money split across two seasons	January 2, 2026	
71	(Canada) Maxime Crépeau	GK	—N/a	Signed through free agency	January 6, 2026	
57	(Brazil) Iago Teodoro	CB	(Brazil) Flamengo	Undisclosed fee, reportedly $1.4m; signed U-22 contract	February 7, 2026	
24	(United States) Griffin Dorsey	RB	(United States) Houston Dynamo	$1m in general allocation money split across two seasons	February 18, 2026	
22	(United States) Justin Ellis	CF	(United States) Orlando City B	Homegrown player contract	February 20, 2026	
7	(France) Antoine Griezmann	FW	(Spain) Atlético Madrid	Free transfer and designated player contract; joined July 13	March 24, 2026	
40	(United States) Tristan Himes	GK	(United States) Orlando City B	Homegrown player contract	July 16, 2026	
33	(Canada) Clovis Archange	CB	(United States) Orlando City B	Homegrown player contract	July 17, 2026	
9	(United States) Daryl Dike	ST	(England) West Bromwich Albion	Signed through free agency; up to $150,000 in general allocation money to Seattle Sounders	July 17, 2026	
44	(Brazil) Bernardo Rhein	LB	(United States) Orlando City B	Homegrown player contract	July 25, 2026	
27	(Brazil) Vinícius Nogueira	LB	(Bulgaria) Ludogorets Razgrad	Loan through the 2027 season with an option to buy	August 27, 2026	

=== Transfers/loans out ===
No.	Name	Pos.	Transferred/loaned to	Fee/notes	Date	Ref.
1	(Peru) Pedro Gallese	GK	(Colombia) Deportivo Cali	Contract expired; signed with Deportivo Cali on December 30, 2025	November 17, 2025	
5	(Uruguay) César Araújo	CM	(Mexico) Tigres UANL	Contract expired; signed with Tigres UANL on February 2, 2026	November 17, 2025	
23	(Ghana) Shak Mohammed	AM	(United States) Nashville SC	Contract option declined; signed with Nashville SC on January 7, 2026	November 17, 2025	
24	(United States) Kyle Smith	RB	(United States) FC Cincinnati	Contract expired; signed with FC Cincinnati on January 7, 2026	November 17, 2025	
95	(Chile) Favian Loyola	AM	(Chile) Audax Italiano	Contract option declined; signed with Audax Italiano on January 15, 2026	November 17, 2025	
99	(United States) Carlos Mercado	GK		Contract option declined	November 17, 2025	
68	(United States) Thomas Williams	CB	(United States) Nashville SC	Up to $100,000 in general allocation money	December 8, 2025	
17	(Iceland) Dagur Dan Þórhallsson	RB	(Canada) CF Montréal	Up to $625,000 in general allocation money	December 10, 2025	
15	(Argentina) Rodrigo Schlegel	CB	(Mexico) Atlas	Undisclosed fee, reportedly $600,000	December 16, 2025	
11	(Colombia) Nicolás Rodríguez	RW	(Colombia) Atlético Nacional	Season-long loan to Atlético Nacional with an option to buy	January 8, 2026	
9	(Colombia) Luis Muriel	CF	(Colombia) Junior	Undisclosed fee with sell-on percentage	January 14, 2026	
30	(United States) Alex Freeman	RB	(Spain) Villarreal	Up to near-$7m fee ($4m base) with a sell-on percentage	January 29, 2026	
13	(United States) Duncan McGuire	ST	(United States) Houston Dynamo FC	Up to $2.4m in general allocation money	July 10, 2026	
34	(Japan) Yutaro Tsukada	LW	(United States) Rhode Island FC	Season-long loan to Rhode Island FC	July 30, 2026	
29	(United States) Tahir Reid-Brown	LB	(United States) St. Louis City SC	Up to $425,000 in general allocation money	August 13, 2026	
25	(United States) Colin Guske	DM	(United States) Real Salt Lake	Season-long loan to Real Salt Lake in exchange for $50,000 in general allocation money and an option to buy	August 21, 2026	
