= Iago Teodoro =

Brazilian footballer (born 2005)

- Iago with Orlando City in 2026

Personal information
- Full name: Iago Teodoro da Silva Nogueira
- Date of birth: 18 April 2005 (age 21)
- Place of birth: Volta Redonda, Brazil
- Height: 1.89 m (6 ft 2 in)
- Position: Centre-back

Team information
- Current team: Orlando City
- Number: 57

Youth career
- 2018–2020: Volta Redonda
- 2021–2024: Flamengo

Senior career*
Years	Team	Apps	(Gls)
2024–2026	Flamengo	5	(1)
2026–	Orlando City	22	(0)

International career^{‡}
2025	Brazil U20	12	(3)
Medal record
Men's football
Representing Brazil
South American U-20 Championship
Winner	2025 Venezuela
- * Club domestic league appearances and goals as of 20:55, 31 October 2026 (UTC) ‡ National team caps and goals as of 21:28, 18 January 2026 (UTC)

Iago Teodoro da Silva Nogueira (born 18 April 2005) is a Brazilian professional footballer who plays as centre-back for Major League Soccer club Orlando City.

== Club career ==
Iago Teodoro was 13 years old when he joined the academy of Volta Redonda, and in 2021 he joined the youth academy of Flamengo. In April 2022, he signed his first professional contract with Flamengo until 2025. In 2024, he was named captain for their U20s. He made his senior and professional debut with Flamengo as a substitute in a scoreless tie with Associação Atlética Portuguesa on 27 January 2024. On 29 February 2024, he extended his contract with the club until 2026.

On 11 January 2026, Iago scored his first goal for the Flamengo senior team when he equalized against Associação Atlética Portuguesa in the final minutes of the opening Campeonato Carioca match, resulting in a 1–1 draw.

On 7 February 2026, Iago signed with Major League Soccer club Orlando City through the 2028–29 season for a reported $1.4 million fee. Iago made his first start and his team debut on 21 February against the New York Red Bulls, conceding two goals in the first half, before being substituted during halftime as Orlando City lost 2–1. On 29 April, Iago scored his first goal for Orlando City when he scored a header through a free kick from Tiago in a 4–3 win over New England Revolution in the U.S. Open Cup.

== International career ==
Iago Teodoro was first called up to the Brazil U20s for a set of friendlies in August 2024. He made the final Brazil U20 squad that played at the 2025 South American U-20 Championship in Venezuela. In Brazil's opening match against Argentina on 24 January 2025, they were routed 6–0, but on 16 February, Brazil defeated Chile 3–0 to finish top of the final stage standings and win the tournament ahead of Argentina in second. Iago scored his first international goal during the tournament, the second goal of a 3–2 win over Ecuador on 31 January.

On 1 September, Iago received another call-up to the Brazil U20 team, this time for the FIFA U-20 World Cup in Chile. Iago represented Brazil as captain as they were defeated 2–1 by Morocco and eliminated in the group stage.

== Career statistics ==
As of match played 19 November 2026

Appearances and goals by club, season and competition
Club	Season	League			National cup (Note: Includes Copa do Brasil and U.S. Open Cup)		State league (Note: Includes Campeonato Carioca)		Continental		Other		Total	
Club	Season	Division	Apps	Goals	Apps	Goals	Apps	Goals	Apps	Goals	Apps	Goals	Apps	Goals
Flamengo	2024	Série A	0	0	0	0	1	0	0	0	—		1	0
Flamengo	2025	Série A	1	0	0	0	0	0	0	0	—		1	0
Flamengo	2026	Série A	0	0	0	0	3	1	0	0	—		3	1
Flamengo	Total		1	0	0	0	4	1	0	0	0	0	5	1
Orlando City	2026	Major League Soccer	22	0	1	1	—		0	0	3 (Note: Two appearances in Leagues Cup; one appearance in MLS Cup playoffs)	0	26	1
Career total			23	0	1	1	4	1	0	0	3	0	31	2

== Honours ==
Flamengo U20

- Under-20 Intercontinental Cup: 2024, 2025
- U-20 Copa Libertadores: 2024, 2025

Flamengo

- Campeonato Brasileiro Série A: 2025
- Copa do Brasil: 2022, 2024
- Campeonato Carioca: 2024, 2025

Brazil U20

- South American U-20 Championship: 2025
