= Luis Otávio (footballer, born 2007) =

Brazilian footballer (born 2007)

- Luis Otávio with Orlando City in 2026

Personal information
- Full name: Luis Otávio Costa de Aquino
- Date of birth: 12 April 2007 (age 19)
- Place of birth: Beberibe, Brazil
- Height: 1.81 m (5 ft 11 in)
- Position: Defensive midfielder

Team information
- Current team: Orlando City
- Number: 5

Youth career
- 2022: Juazeiro
- 2022–2025: Internacional

Senior career*
Years	Team	Apps	(Gls)
2024–2025	Internacional	28	(0)
2026–	Orlando City	26	(1)
- * Club domestic league appearances and goals as of 20:52, 31 October 2026 (UTC)

Luis Otávio Costa de Aquino (born 12 April 2007) is a Brazilian professional footballer who plays as a defensive midfielder for Major League Soccer club Orlando City.

== Club career ==
=== Internacional ===
Born in Beberibe, Ceará, Luis Otávio joined Internacional's youth sides in October 2022, from local side Juazeiro EE. In April 2024, he signed his first professional contract with the club.

Luis Otávio made his professional – and Série A – debut on 19 October 2024, coming on as a late substitute for Wesley in a 1–0 home win over rivals Grêmio.

=== Orlando City ===
On 26 December 2025, Luis Otávio signed with Major League Soccer club Orlando City on a two-season contract with a club option for another year in exchange for a $3.2 million transfer fee and 60% of his rights. On 7 March 2026, Luis Otávio made his debut for Orlando City as a starter against New York City FC, but the club fell 5–0 in their joint-worst defeat in their history after their starting goalkeeper, Maxime Crépeau, received a red card in the 16th-minute of the game for handling the ball outside the penalty box. On 22 April, Luis Otávio scored his first goal of his professional career when he scored the first goal of a 4–1 win over Charlotte FC.

== International career ==
On 13 March 2026, Luis Otávio received his first international call-up after being selected by Brazil U20 coach Paulo Victor Gomes for two friendlies against Paraguay on 28 and 31 March.

== Career statistics ==
As of 19 November 2026

Appearances and goals by club, season and competition
Club	Season	League			State league (Note: Includes Campeonato Gaúcho)		National cup (Note: Includes Copa do Brasil and U.S. Open Cup)		Continental (Note: Includes Copa Sudamericana and Copa Libertadores)		Other		Total	
Club	Season	Division	Apps	Goals	Apps	Goals	Apps	Goals	Apps	Goals	Apps	Goals	Apps	Goals
Internacional	2024	Série A	6	0	0	0	0	0	0	0	—		6	0
Internacional	2025	Série A	20	0	2	0	0	0	0	0	—		22	0
Internacional	Total		26	0	2	0	0	0	0	0	0	0	28	0
Orlando City	2026	Major League Soccer	26	1	—		2	0	—		3 (Note: Two appearance in Leagues Cup, one appearance in MLS Cup playoffs)	0	31	1
Career total			52	1	2	0	2	0	0	0	3	0	59	1

== Honours ==
Internacional

- Campeonato Gaúcho: 2025
