= Harvey Sarajian =

American soccer player (born 2005)

- Sarajian with Orlando City in 2026

Personal information
- Date of birth: January 26, 2005 (age 21)
- Place of birth: Naples, Florida, US
- Height: 6 ft 2 in (1.88 m)
- Positions: Winger; attacking midfielder

Team information
- Current team: Orlando City
- Number: 23

Youth career
- Florida West F.C.
- Real Salt Lake

College career
Years	Team	Apps	(Gls)
2024	Georgia Southern Eagles	17	(4)
2025	Wake Forest Demon Deacons	17	(2)

Senior career*
Years	Team	Apps	(Gls)
2023	Naples Captains		
2024–2025	Inter City FC		
2026–	Orlando City	12	(2)
2026–	→ Orlando City B (loan)	16	(6)
- * Club domestic league appearances and goals as of 21:03, October 31, 2026 (UTC)

Harvey Sarajian (born January 26, 2005) is an American professional soccer player who plays as a winger or attacking midfielder for Major League Soccer club Orlando City.

Sarajian spent two seasons playing college soccer with Georgia Southern Eagles and the Wake Forest Demon Deacons respectively, and also played as a placekicker for the Southern Eagles' football team. While playing college soccer, Sarajian also played in the United Premier Soccer League. He was picked fifth overall in the 2026 MLS SuperDraft by Orlando City and signed a professional contract eight days later.

== Early career ==
Sarajian played youth soccer with Florida West F.C., a youth soccer program based in Fort Myers. Sarajian described his experience with Florida West F.C. as having given him "a solid foundation to prepare" for the rest of his sporting career. Sarajian's performances before he began competing in high school soccer were described as "unbelievable" by Naples High School head soccer coach Bob Prange after Prange watched Sarajian play youth soccer shortly before he began his high school soccer career under him. Prange said that Sarajian would score "three, four, five goals a game".

As a high school senior, Sarajian scored 23 goals and made 12 assists to help Naples High School to the Class 5A state championship game. Sarajian graduated from Naples High School where, during his senior year, he was named Class 5A Player of the Year and Southwest Florida Boys Soccer Player of the Year for his performances for the school's soccer team in 2023. Additionally, Sarajian was a finalist for the Gatorade Player of the Year award in the men's soccer category. While studying at Naples High School, Sarajian also kicked for the school's American football team and competed in track and field.

In October 2019, Sarajian took part in regional qualifiers for the 2019–20 Generations Adidas Cup with the Real Salt Lake under-15s. Real Salt Lake finished top of their group, with Sarajian scoring one goal across three games. Sarajian also took part in the second leg of regional qualifiers in February 2020, with the Real Salt Lake under-15s losing against the New York Red Bulls under-15s and D.C. United under-15s.

=== College career ===
In 2024, Sarajian moved to Georgia to attend Georgia Southern University, where he played for the school's soccer team. With the Georgia Southern Eagles, Sarajian made his first collegiate goal contribution when he provided an assist to Mitch Picksley in a 2–0 win over the Florida Gulf Coast Eagles on August 30. On September 9, Sarajian scored his first collegiate goal in a 4–1 win at the North Florida Ospreys. In his freshman season, Sarajian provided four goals and six assists across 17 appearances. After the end of the season, Sarajian was named the 2024 Sun Belt Conference Freshman of the Year and was selected for the 2024 First-Team All Conference. While studying at Georgia Southern, Sarajian also played as a placekicker for the school's football team.

On December 21, Sarajian transferred to Wake Forest University where he was added to the Wake Forest Demon Deacons roster. In Sarajian's ninth game for the Demon Deacons on September 22, 2025, he scored his first goal for his new team in a 7–0 win over the Liberty Flames. Overall, over the course of his second season of college soccer, his offensive output decreased to two goals and two assists across 17 appearances.

== Club career ==
=== Semi-professional ===
Prior to attending university at Georgia Southern University and playing for their men's soccer team, Sarajian played a single season with United Premier Soccer League (UPSL) team Naples Captains. In 2024 and 2025, Sarajian continued to play in the UPSL, but represented Inter City FC instead.

=== Orlando City ===
On December 10, 2025, Major League Soccer announced that Sarajian had been invited to attend the 2025 MLS College Showcase in Mesa, Arizona from December 10–13. Eight days later, Sarajian was picked fifth overall in the 2026 MLS SuperDraft by Orlando City. A few weeks later, Sarajian signed a three-season contract with a team option for three more seasons on January 16, 2026. Sarajian made his professional debut for Orlando City's reserve affiliate, Orlando City B, in MLS Next Pro on March 2, scoring his side's only goal as they lost 3–1 to Huntsville City FC. On April 18, Sarajian made his debut for the first team as a second-half substitute in a 1–0 home loss to the Houston Dynamo. Sarajian scored his first goal for Orlando City's senior team on September 12 in a 3–0 win over Toronto FC. Sarajian made his way past three Toronto defenders before passing the ball to Daryl Dike, who returned the pass to Sarajian, allowing Sarajian to take a shot on goal and shoot it into the back of the net past Toronto goalkeeper Luka Gavran. Sarajian described his first goal for Orlando City as a "surreal moment". On October 10, Sarajian made his first start for the senior team in a league match against Columbus Crew, and scored 46 seconds into the match, which Orlando City ultimately won 3–2.

== Personal life ==
Born in the United States, Sarajian is of Armenian descent.

At age 10, Sarajian attended his first-ever professional soccer match: an Orlando City match against the Chicago Fire at Camping World Stadium in 2015. Sarajian would end up signing his first professional contract with Orlando City around 11 years later, and he described it as "a dream come true". Sarajian has three brothers and two sisters, and his father played college football for the Temple Owls.

== Career statistics ==
As of match played October 31, 2026

Appearances and goals by club, season and competition
Club	Season	League			U.S. Open Cup		Continental		Playoffs		Other		Total	
Club	Season	Division	Apps	Goals	Apps	Goals	Apps	Goals	Apps	Goals	Apps	Goals	Apps	Goals
Orlando City	2026	Major League Soccer	12	2	0	0	—		—		2 (Note: Appearances in Leagues Cup)	0	14	2
Orlando City B (loan)	2026	MLS Next Pro	16	6	—		—		—		—		16	6
Career total			28	8	0	0	0	0	0	0	2	0	30	8

== Honors ==
Individual

- Sun Belt Conference Freshman of the Year: 2024
- First-Team All Conference: 2024
