= Fort Lauderdale Strikers =

Fort Lauderdale Strikers may refer to:

- Fort Lauderdale Strikers (1977–1983), member of North American Soccer League from 1977 to 1983
- Fort Lauderdale Strikers (1988–1994), member of American Soccer League from 1988 to 1989 and American Professional Soccer League from 1990 to 1994
- Florida Strikers, member of USISL from 1994 to 1997, known as Fort Lauderdale Strikers for the 1995 season
- Fort Lauderdale Strikers (2006–2016), member of USL First Division from 2006 to 2009 and North American Soccer League from 2011 to 2016.
