= Tyrese Spicer =

Trinidadian footballer (born 2000)

- Spicer with Orlando City in 2026

Personal information
- Date of birth: 4 December 2000 (age 25)
- Place of birth: Trincity, Trinidad and Tobago
- Height: 6 ft 1 in (1.85 m)
- Position: Winger

Team information
- Current team: Orlando City
- Number: 14

Youth career
- Trincity Nationals
- Central FC

College career
Years	Team	Apps	(Gls)
2020–2023	Lipscomb Bisons	58	(29)

Senior career*
Years	Team	Apps	(Gls)
2022	Tennessee SC	10	(3)
2023	Des Moines Menace	8	(2)
2024–2025	Toronto FC	40	(4)
2025–	Orlando City	30	(7)

International career^{‡}
	Trinidad and Tobago U15	2	(0)
2025–	Trinidad and Tobago	12	(2)
- * Club domestic league appearances and goals as of 02:57, 20 September 2026 (UTC) ‡ National team caps and goals as of 02:25, 25 September 2026 (UTC)

Tyrese Spicer (born 4 December 2000) is a Trinidadian professional footballer who plays as a winger for Major League Soccer club Orlando City and the Trinidad and Tobago national team.

A Lipscomb Bisons alumni, Spicer was selected as the number one pick in the 2024 MLS SuperDraft by Toronto FC. In 2025, Spicer was traded to Orlando City. Prior to being drafted, Spicer had played two single seasons with Tennessee SC and Des Moines Menace respectively.

== Early life ==
Spicer began playing youth football at age six with the Trincity Nationals, later playing with Central FC in the Youth Pro League.

Spicer attended St. Mary's College in Trinidad, helping the school become North Zone Champions in 2017. In 2019, he switched to St. Augustine Secondary School, earning SSFL All-Star honours.

== College career ==
In 2020, Spicer was to begin attending Lipscomb University and play with the men's soccer team on an athletic scholarship. However, due to the COVID-19 pandemic, he began attending in January 2021, and debuted in the spring 2021 season (which was delayed from the previous fall).

On 6 February 2021, he made his collegiate debut and also scored his first goal in a victory over the Evansville Purple Aces. On 6 September 2021, Spicer scored a hat-trick in a victory over Evansville, which earned him ASUN Conference Player of the Week honours.

At the end of his sophomore season, he was named to the ASUN Conference All-Conference First Team, the All Region Second Team, was the ASUN Championship Co-MVP, and named to the ASUN All-Tournament Team, as Lipscomb won the ASUN title.

Ahead of his junior season in 2022, Spicer was named the ASUN Preseason Player of the Year, named to the Preseason All-Conference Team, named a USC Player to Watch, and named #65 on the TopDrawerSoccer Top 100 List. At the end of the season, after helping them to another ASUN title, he was named to the All-Conference Second Team, All-Atlantic Region First Team, a Third Team All-American, and the ASUN All-Tournament Team.

Ahead of his senior season, Spicer was again named a USC Player to Watch, was named to the Preseason All-ASUN Team, and was named to the MAC Hermann Trophy Watchlist. In September 2023, he was named the TSWA Men's Soccer Player of the Week. At the end of the season, he was named the ASUN Player of the Year, was named to the All-Conference First Team, All-Region First Team, and a First Team All-American.

== Club career ==
=== Semi-professional ===
On 6 May 2022, Spicer was named to the roster of USL League Two club Tennessee SC ahead of their inaugural season. Two days later, Spicer scored the first goal in team history when he scored the first goal of a 2–2 draw against the Dalton Red Wolves in the opening match of the season. On 5 June, Spicer scored the second goal of a 2–0 win over East Atlanta FC, helping to secure the team's first ever win. In total, Spicer would contribute three goals and an assist across ten appearances for the team as the club placed fifth in the South Central Division, losing out on the playoffs.

Spicer played with USL League Two club Des Moines Menace for the 2023 USL League Two season. On 14 June, Spicer scored a brace as Des Moines defeated Springfield ASC 6–0. Des Moines Menace would ultimately qualify for the playoffs after placing second in the Heartland Division, but Spicer would not participate in the playoffs. In total, Spicer would score two goals and contribute at least three assists across all competitions, including a brace of assists against the Menace's rivals Des Moines United FC.

=== Toronto FC ===
At the 2024 MLS SuperDraft, Spicer was selected first overall by Toronto FC. He pre-signed a contract prior to the draft, and his selection was announced by Toronto Maple Leafs captain John Tavares. Upon being drafted, Spicer said that he "will definitely surprise MLS" with his abilities. Spicer made his club debut on 16 March, in a substitute appearance against New York City FC, and followed that up the following week on 23 March, scoring his first professional goal in his first start, in a 2–0 victory over Atlanta United, becoming the sixth MLS SuperDraft first pick to score on his first start. Spicer's performance against Atlanta United saw him named to the Team of the Matchday two days later. In Spicer's first professional season he would contribute three goals and two assists in 20 appearances across all competitions.

=== Orlando City ===
On 1 August 2025, Spicer was traded to Orlando City, in exchange for up to $550,000 in General Allocation Money across two seasons. Toronto FC also retained a sell-on percentage for any future potential transfer. Following Spicer's departure from the club, Toronto FC general manager Jason Hernandez thanked Spicer for his contributions to the team over the past two seasons, but said the transfer came about because it was communicated that Spicer "only wanted to continue with the club if certain contractual commitments and conditions were secured this summer" ahead of the end of his contract at the end of the season. Toronto FC found Spicer's demands unacceptable and opted to move him on ahead of the expiration of his contract. In an interview with The Canadian Press, Hernandez revealed that Spicer's agent had demanded "four or five times" his current annual contract, which was US$83,122, the third-lowest on Toronto FC's roster, and that it was an easy decision to make for him to move Spicer to Orlando City.

When signing with Orlando, Spicer spoke to the captain of the Trinidad & Tobago national team, Kevin Molino, who used to play for Orlando City, about his experience with the team, and Spicer described carrying on the Trinidadian legacy in the team as a motivating factor in choosing to play for Orlando City. On 10 August, Spicer made his debut when he substituted on for Iván Angulo in the 90th-minute in a 4–1 win over Orlando City's rivals Inter Miami. Following his first match with Orlando, Spicer said that Orlando City is a much better team than Toronto FC and that Toronto did not contend for titles, and that his development as a professional footballer was being stunted with his former team.

In the following match, six days later against Sporting Kansas City, Spicer made his first start and scored his first goal for the team in just one minute and ten seconds. Spicer's goal trumped the previous record of 17 minutes and 54 seconds for the fastest goal scored by an Orlando City player in their first start. After the conclusion of Spicer's first season with Orlando City, the team opted to exercise his contract option, which would see him under contract through 2026. Later, on 20 December, Spicer signed a new contract which would see him signed to the club through the 2027–28 season and a club option for the next season.

On 2 May 2026, Spicer scored the final goal of a 4–3 comeback win over Inter Miami, a feat which made Orlando City only the third team in league history to come back from a 3–0 deficit and win the game.

== International career ==
Spicer played two matches with the Trinidad and Tobago U15 team, recording two assists. In June 2020, he attended a training camp with the Trinidad and Tobago senior team.

On 21 March 2025, he made his debut for the Trinidad and Tobago senior team in a 2–1 victory over Cuba in a 2025 CONCACAF Gold Cup qualification match. On 29 August, Spicer was called up by head coach Dwight Yorke for 2026 FIFA World Cup qualifying matches against Curaçao, Jamaica, and Bermuda. Spicer was retained for the following international window and qualifying matches against Bermuda and Curaçao. On 10 August, Spicer scored his first goal for the national team in a 3–0 win at Bermuda. In the following match at Curaçao, Spicer scored an equalizing goal to help the game end 1–1. Spicer was again called up for the final qualifying matches against Jamaica and Bermuda and entering the final two matches Trinidad and Tobago needed to defeat Jamaica and improve their goal difference. The Soca Warriors drew Jamaica 1–1 and subsequently failed to qualify for the 2026 FIFA World Cup behind Jamaica and Curaçao.

Spicer was recalled to the national team by Derek King on 15 September 2026 for CONCACAF Nations League matches against Haiti, the Dominican Republic, and Curaçao from 24 September to 4 October. Spicer suffered an injury during their match against Haiti, which they lost 3–2, and later underwent surgery to repair a Jones fracture to his right foot.

== Personal life ==
Spicer originated from a poor background in Trinidad & Tobago. Spicer described how he sometimes went hungry but that, because of God and his faith in himself and God, he was able to work through his poverty to become a professional footballer.

== Career statistics ==
=== Club ===
As of match played 19 September 2026

Appearances and goals by club, season and competition
Club	Season	League			National cup (Note: Includes Canadian Championship and U.S. Open Cup)		Continental		Playoffs		Other		Total	
Club	Season	Division	Apps	Goals	Apps	Goals	Apps	Goals	Apps	Goals	Apps	Goals	Apps	Goals
Tennessee SC	2022	USL League Two	10	3	—		—		—		—		10	3
Des Moines Menace	2023	USL League Two	8	2	0	0	—		0	0	—		8	2
Toronto FC	2024	Major League Soccer	19	2	1	1	—		—		0	0	20	3
Toronto FC	2025	Major League Soccer	21	2	1	1	—		—		—		22	3
Toronto FC	Total		40	4	2	2	0	0	0	0	0	0	42	6
Orlando City	2025	Major League Soccer	8	1	—		—		1	1	3 (Note: Appearances in Leagues Cup)	0	12	2
Orlando City	2026	Major League Soccer	22	6	3	1	—		—		2	1	27	8
Orlando City	Total		30	7	3	1	0	0	1	0	5	1	39	10
Career total			88	16	5	3	0	0	1	1	5	1	99	21

=== International ===
As of match played 24 September 2026

Appearances and goals by national team and year
National team	Year	Apps	Goals
Trinidad and Tobago	2025	11	2
Trinidad and Tobago	2026	1	0
Total		12	2

Scores and results list Trinidad and Tobago goal tally first, score column indicates score after each Spicer goal

List of international goals scored by Tyrese Spicer
No.	Date	Venue	Opponent	Score	Result	Competition
1	10 October 2025	Bermuda National Stadium, Hamilton, Bermuda	Bermuda	2–0	3–0	2026 FIFA World Cup qualification
2	14 October 2025	Ergilio Hato Stadium, Willemstad, Curaçao	Curaçao	1–1	1–1	2026 FIFA World Cup qualification

== Honours ==
Toronto FC

- Canadian Championship runner-up: 2024

Lipscomb Bisons

- Atlantic Sun Conference men's soccer regular season champions: 2021, 2022, 2023
- Atlantic Sun Conference men's soccer tournament: 2021, 2022, 2023

Individual

- Atlantic Sun Conference All-Conference First Team: 2021
- United Soccer Coaches All-Region Second Team: 2021
- Atlantic Sun Conference men's soccer tournament MVP: 2021
- Atlantic Sun Conference All-Tournament Team: 2021, 2022
- Atlantic Sun Conference All-Conference Second Team: 2022
- United Soccer Coaches All-Atlantic First Team: 2022
- United Soccer Coaches All-Americans Third Team: 2022
- Atlantic Sun Conference Player of the Year: 2023
- Atlantic Sun Conference All-Conference First Team: 2023
- United Soccer Coaches All-Region First Team: 2023
- United Soccer Coaches All-Americans First Team: 2023
