= Tiago (footballer, born 2005) =

Brazilian footballer (born 2005)

- Tiago with Orlando City in 2026

Personal information
- Full name: Tiago Souza de Jesus Carvalho
- Date of birth: 8 April 2005 (age 21)
- Place of birth: Ipirá, Brazil
- Height: 1.78 m (5 ft 10 in)
- Position: Forward

Team information
- Current team: Orlando City
- Number: 11

Youth career
- 2018–2024: Bahia

Senior career*
Years	Team	Apps	(Gls)
2023–2025	Bahia	39	(5)
2026–	Orlando City	19	(1)
- * Club domestic league appearances and goals as of 03:00, 20 September 2026 (UTC)

Tiago Souza de Jesus Carvalho (born 8 April 2005), simply known as Tiago, is a Brazilian professional footballer who plays as a forward for Major League Soccer club Orlando City.

== Career ==
=== Bahia ===
Born in Ipirá, Bahia, Tiago was an Esporte Clube Bahia's youth graduate, and trained with the main squad for the first time in February 2022. He made his senior debut on 11 February 2023, coming on as a second-half substitute in a 1–0 Campeonato Baiano away win over Doce Mel, as Bahia lined up players from the under-20 squad.

In October 2023, Tiago renewed his contract with the Esquadrão de aço until 2026. He made his Série A debut on 25 July 2024, replacing Thaciano late into a 1–1 away draw against Atlético Goianiense.

=== Orlando City ===
On 19 December 2025, Tiago signed with Major League Soccer club Orlando City in exchange for a reported $6 million transfer fee. Tiago signed a two-season contract with a club option for another season. On 21 February 2026, Tiago scored in his debut for Orlando City in a 2–1 loss to the New York Red Bulls. Tiago scored a brace on 19 May in the quarter-finals of the U.S. Open Cup against Atlanta United to help advance Orlando to the semi-finals through a 4–1 win.

== Career statistics ==
As of 19 September 2026

Appearances and goals by club, season and competition
Club	Season	League			State league		National cup (Note: Includes Copa do Brasil and U.S. Open Cup)		Continental		Other		Total	
Club	Season	Division	Apps	Goals	Apps	Goals	Apps	Goals	Apps	Goals	Apps	Goals	Apps	Goals
Bahia	2023	Série A	0	0	2	0	0	0	—		0	0	1	0
Bahia	2024	Série A	4	0	2	0	0	0	—		1 (Note: Appearance(s) in Copa do Nordeste)	0	7	0
Bahia	2025	Série A	25	3	6	2	4	0	1	0	7	6	43	11
Bahia	Total		29	3	10	2	4	0	1	0	8	6	51	11
Orlando City	2026	Major League Soccer	19	1	—		3	2	—		1 (Note: Appearances in Leagues Cup)	0	23	3
Career total			48	4	10	2	7	2	1	0	9	6	74	14

== Honours ==
Bahia

- Campeonato Baiano: 2025
- Copa do Nordeste: 2025
