= Martín Ojeda =

Argentine footballer (born 1998)

- Ojeda with Orlando City in 2026

Personal information
- Full name: Martín Exequiel Ojeda
- Date of birth: 27 November 1998 (age 27)
- Place of birth: Gualeguaychú, Entre Ríos, Argentina
- Height: 1.73 m (5 ft 8 in)
- Positions: Winger; attacking midfielder

Team information
- Current team: Orlando City
- Number: 10

Youth career
- Ferro Carril Oeste

Senior career*
Years	Team	Apps	(Gls)
2016–2017	Ferro Carril Oeste	43	(5)
2017–2020	Racing Club	14	(0)
2019–2020	→ Huracán (loan)	9	(1)
2020–2022	Godoy Cruz	50	(18)
2023–	Orlando City	129	(42)
- * Club domestic league appearances and goals as of 23:48, 7 November 2026 (UTC)

Martín Exequiel Ojeda (born 27 November 1998) is an Argentine professional footballer who plays as a winger or attacking midfielder for Major League Soccer club Orlando City.

== Club career ==
Ojeda began his senior career with Ferro Carril Oeste of Primera B Nacional. His debut appearance for the club arrived on 30 January 2016 against Atlético Paraná, playing eighty-five minutes and scoring Ferro Carril Oeste's only goal in a 1–1 draw. He scored two more goals in twenty further appearances during 2016. After twenty-four appearances and two goals in his second campaign, Ojeda departed in July 2017 to join Primera División side Racing Club. He made his first top-flight appearance on 17 September versus Banfield, which was one of sixteen matches in his opening season as they finished in seventh place.

After appearing just twice in 2018–19, in the Copa Sudamericana against Corinthians on both occasions, Ojeda left on loan in July 2019 to fellow Primera División team Huracán. He made a total of twelve appearances, scoring in his final league match on 7 March 2020 against Banfield.

=== Orlando City ===
==== 2023–24 seasons ====
On 7 January 2023, Ojeda signed a three-year designated player contract with an additional two option years with Orlando City of Major League Soccer. Ojeda scored his first goal for the club in a 2–1 loss to Charlotte FC on 18 March. In his first season, Ojeda only contributed five goals and did not record any assists. Ojeda described his debut season as not meeting his expectations, saying that at times he "felt good", but that he often felt "incomplete" and that he wasn't being good enough of a use to the team.

On 20 July 2024, during a match against New York City FC, Ojeda simulated getting struck by NYCFC player Strahinja Tanasijević, causing Tanasijević to receive a yellow card. Six days later for Ojeda's actions against Tanasijević, Major League Soccer's Disciplinary Committee announced that Ojeda was fined for violating the Simulation-Embellishment policy. By the end of the 2024 season, Ojeda scored seven goals and made 13 assists in 45 appearances across all competitions, tying him with Nicolás Lodeiro for the most assists for the club in the season and making him only second to Facundo Torres in total goal contributions with twenty. However, Ojeda led the club for the most assists with 12 in the regular season.

==== 2025 season ====
On 25 January 2025, it was announced that Ojeda would be moved to the number 10 kit, which was previously worn by the departing Facundo Torres. On 22 March, Ojeda scored the second goal of a 4–1 win over D.C. United with an assist from Iván Angulo and later made two assists, first to Alex Freeman when he delivered a free kick into the box and later when he passed to Marco Pašalić to help Pašalić score the fourth Orlando City goal of the match. Ojeda's performance would see him named to the Team of the Matchday two days later. On 10 May, Ojeda scored his first career hat-trick and the first hat-trick for an Orlando City player since Cyle Larin in September 2015 in a 3–3 draw with the New England Revolution. For Ojeda's hat-trick performance he was once again named to the Team of the Matchday. In the following league match, Ojeda was once again named to the Team of the Matchday for his goal-scoring performance, this time against Charlotte FC, in a 3–1 win.

On 12 July, Ojeda's goal in a 1–1 draw with CF Montréal saw him set a new club record for the most consecutive games with a goal contribution with seven matches in a row seeing him either score or assist. Ojeda's goal also saw him become only the third player for the club to reach double digits goals and assists in a single season after Nani in 2019 and Facundo Torres in 2022. On 19 July, Ojeda scored a brace in a 2–1 win at New England Revolution, which brought him to 12 goals and 10 assists across the regular season, tying Nani's record for the most goal contributions in a regular season and further extended his goal contribution record to nine. Ojeda's performance saw him named to the Team of the Matchday for the fourth time in the season a day later.

On 25 July, Ojeda surpassed Nani for the most goal contributions in a regular season, tied Facundo Torres for the most goal contributions in club history, and extended his consecutive goal contribution record to ten when he scored the final goal of a 3–1 win at Columbus Crew. His performance against Columbus Crew would see him named to the Team of the Matchday three days later. On 2 August, Ojeda scored his team's second goal and assisted on Marco Pašalić's final goal in a 3–1 win over Atlas in the Leagues Cup. Ojeda's goal and assist saw him surpass Facundo Torres' club record for the most goal contributions in a single season with 29 total. On 16 August, Ojeda provided an assist to Ramiro Enrique, tying Sebastian Giovinco for the second longest goal contribution streak in league history with 12, in a 3–1 win over Sporting Kansas City. On 20 September, Ojeda scored a brace in a 3–2 win over Nashville SC to reach 74 all-time goal contributions for the club across all competitions, surpassing the previous record set by Facundo Torres (72). Ojeda's performance would see him named to the Team of the Matchday for the sixth time in the season. In total, Ojeda scored 20 goals and made 13 assists for a total of 33 goal contributions across all competitions. After the conclusion of Ojeda's breakout season with Orlando City, the club exercised their contract option for the 2026 season.

==== 2026 season ====
On 15 January 2026, Ojeda signed a new four-season contract with a team option through the 2029–30 season. On 22 April, after a difficult start to the season for the team, Ojeda scored a brace in a 4–1 win over Charlotte FC, which saw him named to the Team of the Matchday for the first time that season. The following month, Ojeda scored the second hat-trick of his career in a 4–3 comeback win against rivals Inter Miami on 2 May, which was only the third time in league history that a team had recovered from a 3–0 deficit to win; and as a result, he was named Player of the Matchday for the first time in his career for his performance against Inter Miami. On 14 October, Ojeda broke the team record for the most goals scored across all competitions when he scored his 48th in a 3–3 draw at Toronto FC. Three days later, Ojeda scored a midair back-heel goal against D.C. United, and his goal and performance throughout the match, in which he also provided an assist to Antoine Griezmann, saw him named to the Team of the Matchday and win the Goal of the Matchday. Ojeda scored the goal with a scorpion kick, using the outside of his right foot, after a chip from Griezmann into the penalty area. It was his 15th goal of the season. The goal would ultimately win the MLS Goal of the Year.

== Career statistics ==
As of match played 19 November 2026

Appearances and goals by club, season and competition
Club	Season	League			National cup (Note: Includes Copa Argentina)		League cup (Note: Includes Copa de la Liga Profesional, Copa de la Superliga, MLS Cup playoffs)		Continental		Other		Total	
Club	Season	Division	Apps	Goals	Apps	Goals	Apps	Goals	Apps	Goals	Apps	Goals	Apps	Goals
Ferro Carril Oeste	2016	Primera B Nacional	20	3	1	0	—		—		—		21	3
Ferro Carril Oeste	2016–17	Primera B Nacional	23	2	1	0	—		—		—		24	2
Ferro Carril Oeste	Total		43	5	2	0	0	0	0	0	0	0	45	5
Racing Club	2017–18	Argentine Primera División	14	0	1	0	—		1 (Note: Appearance(s) in Copa Libertadores)	0	—		16	0
Racing Club	2018–19	Argentine Primera División	0	0	0	0	—		2 (Note: Appearance(s) in Copa Sudamericana)	0	—		2	0
Racing Club	2019–20	Argentine Primera División	0	0	0	0	—		0	0	—		0	0
Racing Club	2020–21	Argentine Primera División	0	0	0	0	—		0	0	—		0	0
Racing Club	Total		14	0	1	0	0	0	3	0	0	0	18	0
Huracán (loan)	2019–20	Argentine Primera División	9	1	0	0	1	0	2	0	—		12	1
Godoy Cruz (loan)	2020–21	Argentine Primera División	—		5 (Note: Delayed 2019–20 Copa Argentina played in 2021)	2	11	2	—		—		16	4
Godoy Cruz	2021	Argentine Primera División	23	12	—		13	3	—		—		36	15
Godoy Cruz	2022	Argentine Primera División	27	6	4	1	14	6	—		—		45	13
Godoy Cruz	Godoy Cruz total		50	18	9	3	38	11	2	0	0	0	97	32
Orlando City	2023	Major League Soccer	34	6	1	0	2	0	2 (Note: Appearances in CONCACAF Champions Cup)	0	3 (Note: Appearances in Leagues Cup)	0	42	6
Orlando City	2024	Major League Soccer	34	4	—		5	1	4	1	3	1	45	7
Orlando City	2025	Major League Soccer	33	16	2	0	1	0	—		6	4	42	20
Orlando City	2026	Major League Soccer	28	16	4	1	1	1	—		0	0	33	18
Orlando City	Total		129	42	7	1	9	2	6	1	12	5	162	51
Career total			245	66	19	4	47	13	11	1	12	5	334	89

== Honours ==
Individual

- MLS Goal of the Year: 2026
