= Iván Angulo =

Colombian footballer (born 1999)

- Angulo with Orlando City in 2026

Personal information
- Full name: Iván Darío Angulo Cortés
- Date of birth: 22 March 1999 (age 27)
- Place of birth: Tumaco, Colombia
- Height: 1.70 m (5 ft 7 in)
- Position: Winger

Team information
- Current team: Orlando City
- Number: 77

Youth career
- Envigado
- 2019: → Palmeiras (loan)

Senior career*
Years	Team	Apps	(Gls)
2017–2018	Envigado	29	(2)
2019–2023	Palmeiras	1	(0)
2020	→ Cruzeiro (loan)	1	(0)
2020–2021	→ Botafogo (loan)	3	(0)
2021–2022	→ Portimonense (loan)	32	(1)
2022–2023	→ Orlando City (loan)	43	(5)
2022	→ Orlando City B (loan)	1	(1)
2024–	Orlando City	101	(12)

International career^{‡}
2019	Colombia U20	14	(3)
2020	Colombia U23	4	(0)
- * Club domestic league appearances and goals as of 23:45, 7 November 2026 (UTC) ‡ National team caps and goals as of 31 January 2020

Iván Darío Angulo Cortés (born 22 March 1999) is a Colombian professional footballer who plays as a winger for Major League Soccer club Orlando City.

== Career ==
On 14 January 2019, Angulo was loaned out to Palmeiras for one year with an option to buy at the end of the deal. Angulo was going to start out with playing for the clubs U-20 team.

On 11 August 2021, he joined Portimonense in Portugal on loan.

On 25 July 2022, Angulo joined Major League Soccer club Orlando City on a 12-month loan with an additional six-month extension option.

On 3 January 2024, Angulo joined Orlando City on a permanent deal, signing a two-year contract with an option for a further year. Angulo scored a late equalizer, his first competitive goal of the season, on 20 April in a 2–2 draw against CF Montréal.

On 25 July 2025, Angulo provided two assists to Ramiro Enrique to help Orlando City to a 3–1 comeback victory over Columbus Crew. For Angulo's performance he was named to the bench of the Team of the Matchday three days later. Orlando City opted to exercise Angulo's contract option after the conclusion of the season, despite only scoring one goal and providing just seven assists across all competitions.

Angulo was named to the Team of the Matchday for the first time in his career on 14 September 2026, following his performance during a 3–0 win over Toronto FC in which he scored a goal. On 10 October, Angulo scored the final goal of a 3–2 win over the Columbus Crew, extending his league goal scoring streak to five games in a row and tying the club record for the most consecutive league games with a goal scored. Angulo was also named to the Team of the Matchday for the second time in his career for his performance.

== International career ==
On 2 January 2019, Angulo was called up to the Colombia national under-20 team for the 2019 South American U-20 Championship. Angulo would make his international debut in a 1–0 loss to Venezuela on 17 January in the first match of the group stage of the tournament. On 21 January, Angulo scored his first international goal in a 1–0 victory over Bolivia after coming on as a 59th-minute substitute for Johan Carbonero.

On 27 December 2019, Angulo was called up to the Colombia national under-23 team for the 2020 CONMEBOL Pre-Olympic Tournament and he would make four appearances in the tournament, but Colombia would fail to qualify for the 2020 Olympic Games in Tokyo, Japan after they placed bottom of the final stage of the tournament.

== Career statistics ==
As of match played 19 November 2026

Appearances and goals by club, season and competition
Club	Season	League			National cup (Note: Includes Copa Colombia, Copa do Brasil, Taça de Portugal, and U.S. Open Cup)		Continental		Other		Total	
Club	Season	Division	Apps	Goals	Apps	Goals	Apps	Goals	Apps	Goals	Apps	Goals
Envigado	2016	Primera A	0	0	0	0	—		—		0	0
Envigado	2017	Primera A	8	0	4	0	—		—		12	0
Envigado	2018	Primera A	21	2	2	0	—		—		23	2
Envigado	Total		29	2	6	0	0	0	0	0	35	2
Palmeiras	2019	Série A	0	0	—		—		—		0	0
Palmeiras	2020	Campeonato Paulista	1	0	—		—		—		1	0
Palmeiras	Total		1	0	0	0	0	0	0	0	1	0
Cruzeiro (loan)	2020	Campeonato Mineiro	1	0	—		—		—		1	0
Botafogo (loan)	2020	Série A	3	0	1	0	—		—		3	0
Portimonense (loan)	2021–22	Primeira Liga	32	1	4	1	—		—		36	2
Orlando City (loan)	2022	Major League Soccer	9	0	1	0	—		1 (Note: Appearance in MLS Cup playoffs)	0	11	0
Orlando City (loan)	2023	Major League Soccer	35	5	1	0	2	0	6 (Note: One goal and three appearances in Leagues Cup and three appearances in MLS Cup playoffs)	1	44	6
Orlando City	2024	Major League Soccer	34	5	—		3	0	7 (Note: Two appearances in Leagues Cup and five appearances in MLS Cup playoffs)	0	44	5
Orlando City	2025	Major League Soccer	33	0	2	0	—		7 (Note: Six appearances in Leagues Cup and one appearance in MLS Cup playoffs)	1	42	1
Orlando City	2026	Major League Soccer	34	7	4	0	—		3 (Note: One appearance in Leagues Cup, one appearance in MLS Cup playoffs)	0	41	7
Orlando City	Orlando City total		145	17	8	0	5	0	24	2	182	19
Orlando City B (loan)	2022	MLS Next Pro	1	1	—		—		—		1	1
Career total			212	21	19	1	5	0	24	2	259	24

== Honours ==
Orlando City

- U.S. Open Cup: 2022
