= Wilf =

Wilf is a masculine given name, most commonly a diminutive form of Wilfred or Wilfrid. It is also a nickname and a surname.

== People ==
=== Given name ===
- Wilfred Arthur (1919–2000), Australian World War II fighter ace
- Wilf Barber (1901–1968), English cricketer
- Charles Wilf Carter (musician) (1904–1996), Canadian country music singer and yodeler
- Wilf Copping (1909–1980), English footballer
- Wilf Cude (1910–1968), Welsh hockey player
- Wilf Field (1915–1979), Canadian hockey player
- Wilf Hanni, politician and oil industry consultant
- Wilf Homenuik (born 1935), Canadian golfer
- Wilf Hurd (born 1950), Canadian politician
- Wilf Kirkham (1901–1974), British football player
- Wilf Low (1884–1933), Scottish footballer
- Wilf Loughlin, Canadian hockey player
- Wilf Lunn, British television presenter
- Wilf Mannion (1918–2000), English footballer
- Wilf McGuinness (born 1937), English football player and manager
- Wilf O'Reilly (born 1964), British speed skater
- Wilf Paiement (born 1955), Canadian hockey player
- Wilf Proudfoot (born 1921), British politician
- Wilf Rostron (born 1956), English footballer
- Wilf Slack (1954–1989), English cricketer
- Wilf Toman (1874–1917), English footballer
- Wilf Waller (1877–?), South African football player
- Wilf Wedmann (born 1948), Canadian high jumper
- Wilf Wild (1893–1950), British football manager
- Wilf Wooller (1912–1997), Welsh cricketer, rugby union footballer, administrator and journalist

=== Surname ===
- Einat Wilf (born 1970), Israeli politician and member of the Knesset
- Harry Wilf (1921–1992), Polish-born American businessman, brother of Joseph Wilf
- Herbert Wilf (1931–2012), American mathematician
- Joseph Wilf (1925–2016), Polish-born American businessman, brother of Harry Wilf
- Leonard Wilf, American businessman, co-owner of the Minnesota Vikings, son of Harry
- Mark Wilf (born 1962), president and co-owner of the Minnesota Vikings, son of Joseph
- Orin Wilf (born 1973/74), American real estate developer, son of Leonard
- Steven Wilf, American law professor
- Zygi Wilf (born 1950), co-owner of the Minnesota Vikings, son of Joseph

== Fictional characters ==
- Wilfred Mott, a recurring character in the Doctor Who television series
- Wilf, a character in the Chaos Walking book series

== See also ==
- Wilf Campus, the main campus of Yeshiva University, a private university in New York City
- Wilfried (given name)
- Wilfred (given name)
- Wilfredo
- Wilfie, a nickname
