= Wifred =

Wifred (Catalan: Guifré; French: Guifred; Latin: Wifredus; Spanish: Wifredo) may refer to:

- Wifred I of Girona, also count of Besalú (r. 848–852)
- Wifred the Hairy (died 897), count of Barcelona (as Wifred I), Ausona, Girona, Urgell, Cerdanya (as Wifred I) and Conflent
- Wifred II of Barcelona (died 911), also count of Girona and Ausona
- Wifred II of Besalú (died 957), count
- Wifred II of Cerdanya (died 1049), also count of Berga
- Wifred of Cerdanya (archbishop of Narbonne) (died 1081)

== See also ==
- Wilfred (given name)
- Wifredo
