= Wilfred =

Wilfred may refer to:

- Wilfred (given name), a given name and list of people (and fictional characters) with the name
- Wilfred, Indiana, an unincorporated community in the United States
- Wilfred (Australian TV series), a comedy series
- Wilfred (American TV series), a remake of the Australian series
- Wilfred (Thames barge)
- Operation Wilfred, a British Second World War naval operation
- "Wilfred" (Not Going Out), a 2023 television episode

== People with the surname ==
- Harmon Wilfred, stateless businessman in New Zealand
- Thomas Wilfred (1889–1968), Danish musician and inventor

== See also ==
- Wilf
- Wilfredo
- Wilfrid (c. 633 – c. 709), English bishop and saint
- Wilfried
- Wilford (disambiguation)
