= Littlechap Family =

Doll series

The Littlechap Family was a series of dolls released by Remco in the early 1960s. They were an idealized Kennedy-like family consisting on Dr. John Littlechap (who shared the first name and resemblance to the US President), his wife Lisa and their two daughters, Judith, 17 and Libby, 10. Each doll came boxed in a terrycloth robe. There were some outfits and playsets available which sold separately. The dolls were discontinued following the assassination of President Kennedy in 1963.
