= Wilford (disambiguation) =

Wilford is a village in Nottinghamshire, England.

Wilford may also refer to:

== Places ==
- Wilford, Arizona, a ghost town in the United States
- Wilford, Idaho, an unincorporated community in the United States
- Wilford, a townland in County Mayo, Ireland
- Wilford Hundred, a division of Suffolk, England

== Oher uses ==
- Wilford (surname), including a list of people bearing the name
- Wilford Gyroplane

== See also ==
- , including people with the first name "Wilford"
- Wilfred (disambiguation)
