= Demar Stewart =

Jamaican footballer (born 1984)

Personal information
- Full name: Demar Stewart
- Date of birth: 15 December 1984 (age 41)
- Place of birth: Jamaica
- Height: 1.88 m (6 ft 2 in)
- Position: Defender

Senior career*
Years	Team	Apps	(Gls)
2002	Bull Bay		
2003–2007	Portmore United	42	(2)
2007–2009	Sheffield United	0	(0)
2007	→ White Star Woluwé (loan)	9	(1)
2008–2009	→ Chengdu Blades (loan)	47	(0)
2011	Orlando City	15	(2)

International career^{‡}
2006–	Jamaica	10	(0)
- * Club domestic league appearances and goals as of 4 September 2011 ‡ National team caps and goals as of 4 September 2011

Demar Stewart (born 15 December 1984) is a Jamaican footballer who plays football. He is the brother of Bristol City defender Damion Stewart.

== Career ==
=== Club ===
Stewart played for Jamaican sides Bull Bay and Portmore United before being signed up by Sheffield United in England in 2007. He then loaned out to Belgian lower league outfit White Star Woluwé FC because he did not qualify for a United Kingdom work permit, and was loaned again in early 2008 to Sheffield Unioted's Chinese affiliate Chengdu Blades, becoming the inaugural Jamaican player in the Chinese league.

Stewart made his debut for Chengdu against Dalian Shide in Round 4 of the 2008 season, and went on to play 47 games for the team over the next two season. When Chengdu Blades were relegated following a match-fixing scandal, Stewart left the club.

In 2011, Stewart entered training camp with Orlando City, and played in their first match against Philadelphia Union on 19 February. He signed a contract with the club on 21 February, but did not return for the 2012 season.

=== International ===
Stewart progressed through Jamaica's youth programme, representing the country at the Under-17, Under-20 and Under-23 levels, before making his debut for the national team in 2006 in an international friendly against Peru. He has since gone on to make 10 appearances for the Reggae Boyz.
