= Isaac Heller =

American toy manufacturer

- Born: July 23, 1926; Ellenville, New York, U.S.
- Died: March 7, 2015 (aged 88); Scotch Plains, New Jersey, U.S.
- Occupation: Toy manufacturer
- Known for: Co-founder of Remco
- Relatives: Saul Robbins (cousin)

Isaac "Ike" Heller (July 23, 1926 – March 7, 2015) was an American toy manufacturer and engineer, the co-founder of Remco with his cousin Saul Robbins.

== Early life and education ==
Isaac Heller was born on July 23, 1926, in Ellenville, New York, the son of Russian Jewish immigrants, Morris Heller and Yetta Shapiro. Heller moved with his family to Brooklyn, where he attended Brooklyn Technical High School as part of the class of 1943. After attending engineering classes at Cooper Union, he served in the United States Navy at the end of World War II, where he worked on the repair of electronic equipment and built toys using excess work materials. Following the war, he returned to Cooper Union in 1946 to finish his engineering degree, which he completed in 1952.

== Career ==
In 1949, while he was still a student at Cooper Union, Heller co-founded the toy company Remco in Newark, New Jersey, with his cousin Saul Robbins. The name was a contraction of "REMote COntrol", and its first products were children's walkie-talkies. Building on his experience as a U.S. Navy electronics technician, they started by buying large amounts of military surplus and "transforming it into toys that could zoom, soar or otherwise move."

Until the 1960s, they only made toys for boys, and they were the first toy company to use television advertising. Their toys included the Whirlybird helicopter, the Barracuda atomic submarine, the Johnny Reb cannon, the Dick Tracy wrist radio, the Screaming Mee Mee-e rifle and Mr. Kelly's Automatic Car Wash.

After selling the company in 1966, Heller turned his experiences to industrial park development. He founded Heller Industrial Parks, Inc., which he developed into one of the largest industrial park owner / developers in the United States.

== Personal life ==
In 1953, Heller married Helaine Hirsh, and they had four daughters.

Ike and Helaine were generous philanthropists. He donated $1 million to Brooklyn Tech, and was inducted into the school's hall of fame, in 2013. That same year, he donated $1 million to Cooper Union in response to their financial crisis. He used his resources to build the John Kenney Childcare Center in Edison, NJ. Other causes he supported included hospitals, community foundations, libraries, senior centers, and schools.

Heller died at his home in Scotch Plains, New Jersey, on March 7, 2015, and was survived by his wife and four daughters, Audrey Romberg, Laurie Kaufman, Hollie Heller, and Hillary Granfield.

== Honors ==
In 1999, Heller received the President's Citation Award from Cooper Union, and was inducted into the Cooper Union Alumni Hall of Fame. He received a Humanitarian Award from the National Conference of the State of New Jersey, and was frequently recognized by the many charitable causes that he supported.
