= Orlando City SC =

American professional soccer club based in Orlando, Florida

- Nickname: The Lions
- Founded: 2010; 16 years ago: (Note: MLS franchise granted in 2013. Original team founded in 2010.)
- Stadium: Inter.co Stadium; Orlando, Florida
- Capacity: 24,453
- Owner(s): Zygi, Leonard and Mark Wilf
- Head coach: Martín Perelman (interim)
- League: Major League Soccer
- 2026: Eastern Conference: 8th; Overall: 15th; Playoffs: Wild card round
- Website: orlandocitysc.com
Home colors	Away colors	Third colors

Orlando City Soccer Club is an American professional soccer club based in Orlando, Florida. The club competes in Major League Soccer (MLS) as a member of the Eastern Conference. Owned by Zygi, Leonard, and Mark Wilf, it is the sister club of the National Women's Soccer League's Orlando Pride and MLS Next Pro's Orlando City B. The team plays its home games in downtown Orlando at Inter.co Stadium, which is owned and operated by the club.

The team played as a charter member of the USL Pro, winning three Commissioner's Cups and two league championships in its first four seasons. The victories led to a successful bid to enter MLS, the highest level of the United States soccer league system, debuting in its 2015 season alongside New York City FC, and selling their USL franchise rights to Louisville City FC. Since its purchase by the Wilf family in 2021, the club has qualified twice for the CONCACAF Champions Cup, and won the U.S. Open Cup in 2022.

== History ==
=== Background ===
Originally a United Soccer League (USL) club, Orlando City was founded in 2010 by Stoke City board member Phil Rawlins. Following the conclusion of the 2010 season, Rawlins bought the USL franchise rights of Orlando Pro Soccer – an stillbirth club affiliated with the Orlando Titans of the National Lacrosse League that failed to field a team, despite Steve Donner leaving the Titans to focus his efforts on the soccer team. Rawlins subsequently moved Austin Aztex FC to Orlando, bringing with him the Aztex's manager and most of its roster, and unveiled its rebranding as Orlando City SC in an October 2010 press conference. Rawlins stated at the press conference that he intends to bring a Major League Soccer franchise to Orlando "within 3–5 years", and intends to bring international matches to the city. On February 28, 2011, Orlando City announced it met with commissioner Don Garber and league officials concerning expansion. Topics covered included the demographics of the Orlando marketplace, the local corporate and fan support for soccer, and developing a roadmap for a future Major League Soccer franchise in Orlando.

Orlando City's first preseason began with a home match against Major League Soccer club Philadelphia Union, winning 1–0, with Lewis Neal scoring the first goal in club history. Orlando City opened their first season on April 2, 2011, at Richmond Kickers, losing 2–0, and played their first home game on April 9 against F.C. New York, winning 3–0 with Maxwell Griffin scoring the first competitive goal for the club. They finished the regular season top of the American Division on 51 points, which resulted in the USL Pro regular season title. On September 3, they played the Harrisburg City Islanders in the final. This match ended in a 1–1 draw, and after extra time the score was still tied at 2–2. Orlando went on to win 3–2 in penalty kicks making them the 2011 USL Pro champions.

Following their inaugural season, Orlando City team officials met with Garber again on November 10, 2011, for further discussions about joining MLS as its 20th club (which ultimately went to New York City FC).

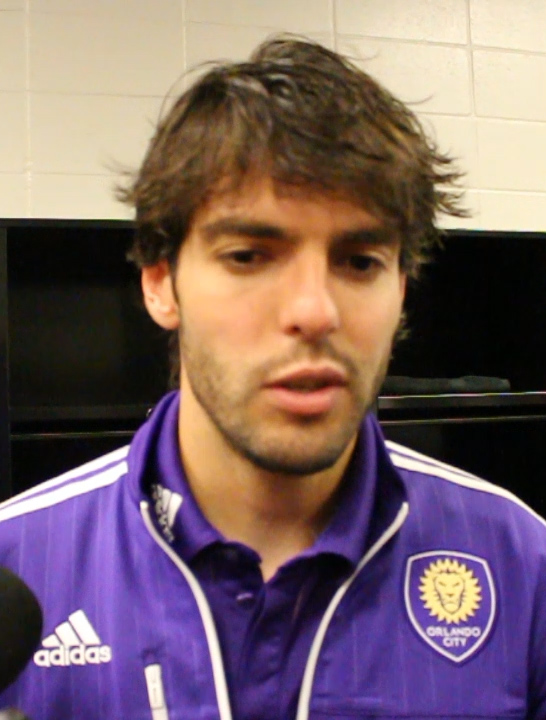
Brazilian World Cup-winner Kaká was the team's first Designated Player

On March 1, 2012, Garber visited Orlando to meet with city and county officials. He stated, "It's not a matter of if, but when", addressing Orlando's chances of joining MLS. Later on August 31, Rawlins told the Orlando Business Journal the team could get the Major League Soccer approval as early as late 2013, and be ready to play in the league by 2014 or 2015. Rawlins said to make that happen, the league had asked the team to explore building a 22,000-seat soccer-specific stadium. "They didn't say we had to have a stadium built before we could join, but they at least would like a plan that it's happening." Orlando City repeated as regular season champions, but exited the playoffs in the semi-finals with a 4–3 loss to Wilmington Hammerheads.

In their third year in USL Pro, the Lions took second place in the regular season. Their first game in the playoffs was a 5–0 win against the Pittsburgh Riverhounds. The semi-finals were a 3–2 win over the defending champions, the Charleston Battery. The result in the finals was a 7–4 win over the Charlotte Eagles. This marked Orlando City's second championship in three years.

On November 19, 2013, led by Flávio Augusto da Silva, Orlando City was announced as the league's twenty-first franchise.

The team's new logo was unveiled in May 2014 and Silva signed their first player to an MLS contract, former Brazil international Kaká, a month later. Kaká, who also became the team's first Designated Player after his release from AC Milan, was immediately loaned to São Paulo until the start of the MLS season. In the same month, Orlando City announced a partnership with Benfica. As part of that partnership, Orlando City later signed two players from Benfica U19s – Estrela and Rafael Ramos – to MLS contracts on August 7, 2014. On July 6, 2014, four Orlando City supporters were arrested following an altercation at Al Lang Field in St. Petersburg during a game against the Tampa Bay Rowdies in which fans were assaulted and illegal fireworks were used after members from both supporters groups had hidden themselves in the crowd. One of the arrested had previously identified himself as a co-president of the Iron Lion Firm. In response, the club "indefinitely suspended" both the Ruckus and Iron Lion Firm, pending their agreement to a new Fan Code of Conduct. One week after the St. Petersburg incident, members of the Iron Lion Firm were ejected from a home game after profane language was chanted in their section. The majority of the remaining Firm members walked out before the end of the game. The Ruckus was reinstated on July 21, 2014, after agreeing to abide by a new Code of Conduct. Weeks later the club reinstated the Iron Lion Firm as a recognized supporter's group as well. On November 21, 2014, head coach Adrian Heath signed a contract extension committing him to the club until the end of the 2017 MLS season.

The fourth year in the USL Pro was its last in the league. In the preseason they competed in the 2014 Walt Disney World Pro Soccer Classic, placing second in their group with three draws and drawing in the third place match against the New York Red Bulls. By finishing the season 19–5–4, Orlando City won its 3rd Commissioner's Cup. As an expansion team, Orlando had the first overall pick in the 2015 MLS SuperDraft and used it to select Canadian forward Cyle Larin. Orlando City's USL Pro license was acquired by minority owner Wayne Estopinal in June 2014. Using the license, Estopinal founded Louisville City FC, based in Louisville, Kentucky, and began play in the 2015 USL season as Orlando City's affiliate.

=== 2015–2019: MLS arrival and subsequent struggles ===
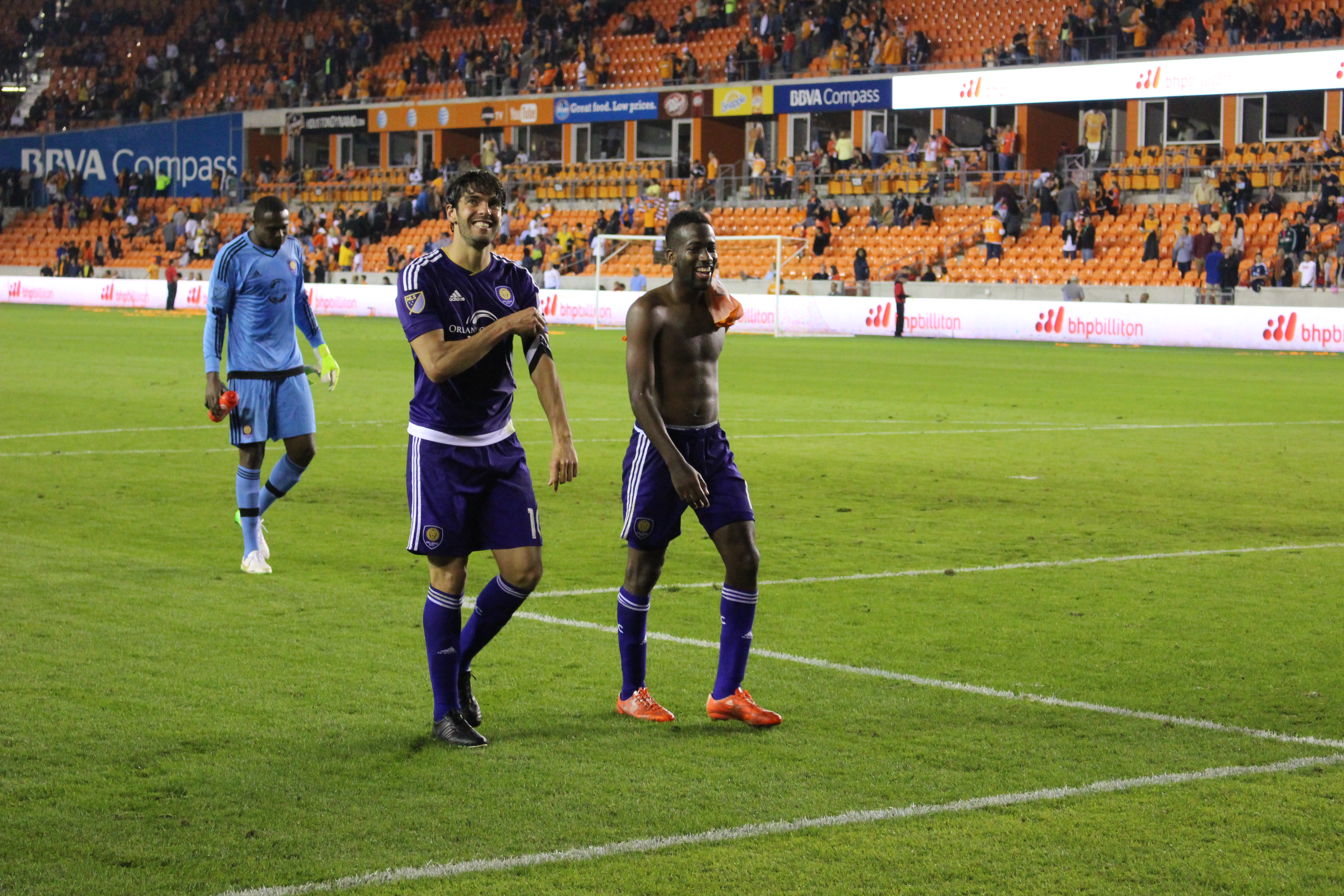
Kaká, Kevin Molino (foreground), and Donovan Ricketts (background) after a match against Houston Dynamo FC in 2015

The team hosted their first MLS game at the Citrus Bowl on March 8, 2015, against fellow expansion team New York City FC, in front of a crowd of 62,510. Kaká scored in stoppage time to earn a 1–1 draw. In the following game, they defeated Houston Dynamo 1–0 on the road to earn their first victory. On March 21, Orlando conceded a late stoppage time goal to Octavio Rivero of Vancouver Whitecaps for their first defeat. In their inaugural season Orlando City finished 7th in the Eastern Conference and 14th in the overall standings, falling short of the playoffs by one point. Larin scored 17 goals across the season, breaking Damani Ralph's record of 13 as a rookie and earned the MLS Rookie of the Year Award.

Midway through the 2016 season, following disappointing results and performance of the team, head coach Adrian Heath was fired in July 2016. He was replaced by Jason Kreis. However, the Lions ended the season missing the playoffs once again.

In 2017, the Lions moved to the purpose-built Orlando City Stadium. With the team again struggling, they attempted to improve during the summer transfer window by acquiring Sporting Kansas City striker Dom Dwyer who had played for Orlando City's USL Pro team on-loan in 2013, notably scoring four goals in the USL Pro Championship final. The club traded incentives totaling to $1.6 million, a record trade between two MLS clubs at the time. The team again failed to reach the postseason. Kaká announced that he would not return for Orlando City and soon after confirmed his retirement.

On January 15, 2018, Orlando City signed Josué Colmán from Paraguayan club Cerro Porteño for a club record fee of reportedly $3 million. Later that same month on January 30, Orlando City transferred Cyle Larin to Turkish club Beşiktaş for a club record fee of reportedly $2.3 million following Larin's "unacceptable behavior" during transfer negotiations in which he had traveled to Turkey and claimed he was a free agent. Fifteen games into the 2018 season, Orlando City released head coach Jason Kreis after nearly two seasons. Two weeks later, USL club Louisville City FC announced head coach James O'Connor, a former defender and assistant coach of the original Orlando City team, was to become Kreis's replacement. However, O'Connor only managed two wins in his 18 games in charge in 2018 as City missed the playoffs for the fourth consecutive season and also set a new MLS record with 74 goals conceded on the year. At the end of the season on December 27, Orlando City transferred Yoshimar Yotún to Mexican club Cruz Azul for a new club record fee of reportedly $4 million.

O'Connor was fired at the end of the 2019 season with the team missing out on playoffs again and remaining 11th in the Eastern Conference.

=== 2020–present: Consistent success and first post-USL trophy ===
Ahead of the 2020 season, Orlando hired former Colorado Rapids and FC Dallas head coach Óscar Pareja. With the season disrupted due to the COVID-19 pandemic, Orlando competed in the MLS is Back Tournament held at the ESPN Wide World of Sports Complex in July and August. The Lions reached the final, eventually losing to the Portland Timbers 2–1. MLS resumed the regular season on August 12. After failing to make the postseason the previous five years, Orlando snapped the joint second-longest MLS playoff drought in history under the guidance of Pareja. The Lions reached the conference semi-finals, eliminating New York City FC in a dramatic penalty shootout in the first round before losing to New England Revolution.

On May 12, 2021, Orlando City majority owner Flavio Augusto da Silva announced he was in advanced negotiations with Zygi and Mark Wilf, owners of National Football League franchise Minnesota Vikings, for the sale of the club including the Orlando Pride, Inter.co Stadium (which at the time was called Exploria Stadium), and other related soccer assets. The combined value of the deal was estimated at $400–450 million. The sale was officially completed on July 21, 2021. Orlando qualified for the playoffs for a second season in a row, but were eliminated in the first round by Nashville SC.

On January 1, 2022, Orlando City transferred Daryl Dike to English club West Bromwich Albion for a club record transfer fee of $9.5 million. Later on January 24, Orlando City broke their transfer record, previously held by the signing of Josué Colmán, with the signing of Facundo Torres from Uruguayan club Peñarol by reportedly paying a combined total of $9 million to sign the player. On September 7, 2022, Orlando City won their first trophy as an MLS team, beating USL Championship side Sacramento Republic 3–0 in the 2022 U.S. Open Cup final. Orlando once again qualified for the playoffs, but were defeated again in the first round, this time by CF Montréal.

Orlando debuted in the CONCACAF Champions League in 2023, qualifying as U.S. Open Cup winners. The team's first opponent was Mexican-side Tigres UANL in the round of 16. The Lions were eliminated by Tigres on the away goals rule after a 1–1 draw on aggregate. Orlando finished the regular season in second place overall and in the eastern conference with 63 points, the club's highest points total and highest placement in both the overall and eastern conference tables. The Lions would make it past their first playoffs game for the first time since their playoffs debut, but would be knocked out by Columbus Crew, the eventual champions, in the conference semifinals.

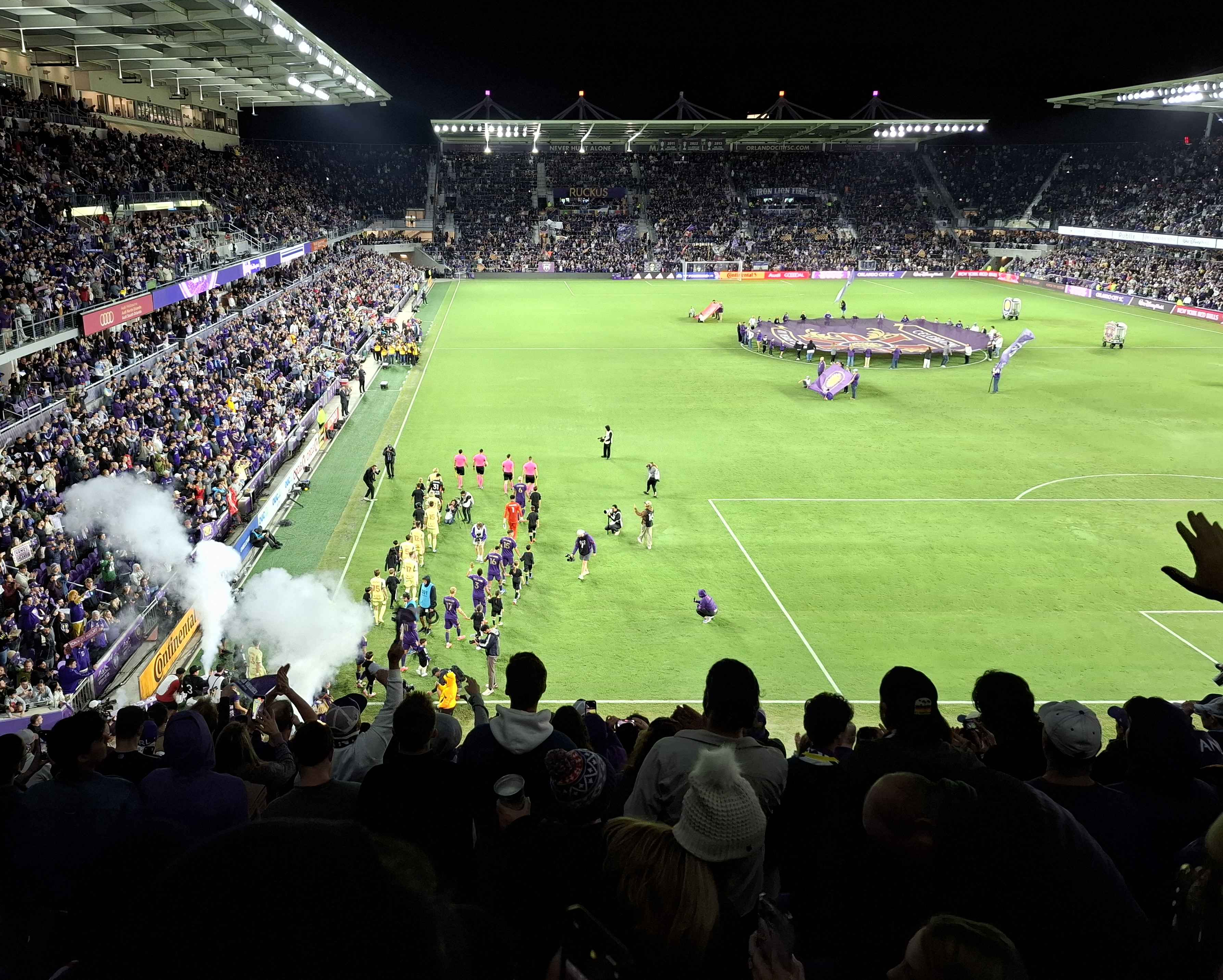
Orlando City and New York Red Bulls players emerge onto the field at the start of the 2024 Eastern Conference final

Orlando qualified for the 2024 CONCACAF Champions Cup due to their placement in the 2023 MLS Supporters' Shield standings. In round one, Orlando faced Canadian-side Cavalry FC, and defeated them 6–1 on aggregate, the first time the club had won in the competition. In the following round, Orlando once again faced Tigres UANL, and were subsequently defeated 4–2 on aggregate after a goalless draw at home. On March 1, the United States Soccer Federation announced the format for the 2024 U.S. Open Cup, confirming that only eight MLS teams, not including Orlando City despite the club winning the competition two years prior, would be participating due to the league's failed attempt to withdraw from the competition entirely. Orlando finished the regular season in 4th place in the Eastern Conference with 59 goals scored in the regular season, a club record. Orlando later advanced the furthest they ever had in the playoffs, but were eliminated in the Eastern Conference final by the New York Red Bulls. On December 20, Orlando transferred Facundo Torres to Brazilian club Palmeiras for a new club record fee of reportedly up to $14 million.

In 2025, Orlando City returned to the U.S. Open Cup where they were defeated by Nashville SC in the round of 16. Orlando also participated in the Leagues Cup for the third consecutive season. In the Leagues Cup, Orlando City placed fourth after being knocked out of the semi-finals by rivals Inter Miami and losing in the third place match to LA Galaxy, a match which, if they won, would've secured qualification to the 2026 CONCACAF Champions Cup. Orlando City finished the regular season with their most prolific offense of all time, with 63 goals scored, but placed ninth in the Eastern Conference, resulting in them qualifying for the wild card round in the playoffs. Orlando City lost the wild card match 3–1 to the Chicago Fire, resulting in the earliest exit from the playoffs in team history. After the conclusion of the season, Alex Freeman became the second player in team history to win the MLS Young Player of the Year Award after Cyle Larin in 2015 and the first player in team history to be named to the MLS Best XI. On January 29, 2026, Freeman moved to La Liga club Villarreal for a reported transfer fee of up to $7,000,000, a club‑record fee for a Homegrown Player. Additionally, Pedro Gallese, who had become the starting goalkeeper in 2020 and had become the team's most successful player in that position left the team.

Griezmann playing for the club in 2026

On March 11, 2026, Orlando City announced that the club and Pareja had reached a mutual agreement to terminate his contract. The 2026 season began with Orlando recording three consecutive losses to start a season for the first time in their history. Pareja was replaced on an interim-basis by assistant coach Martín Perelman. On March 23, Orlando City negotiated the signing of Antoine Griezmann as a designated player, with Griezmann joining the club following the expiration of his contract with La Liga club Atlético Madrid and the opening of the next MLS transfer window on July 13. Griezmann's signing made him the second FIFA World Cup winner to sign for the club, after Kaká in 2015, and only the 21st former World Cup winning player to play in the league.

== Stadium ==
=== Prior stadiums ===
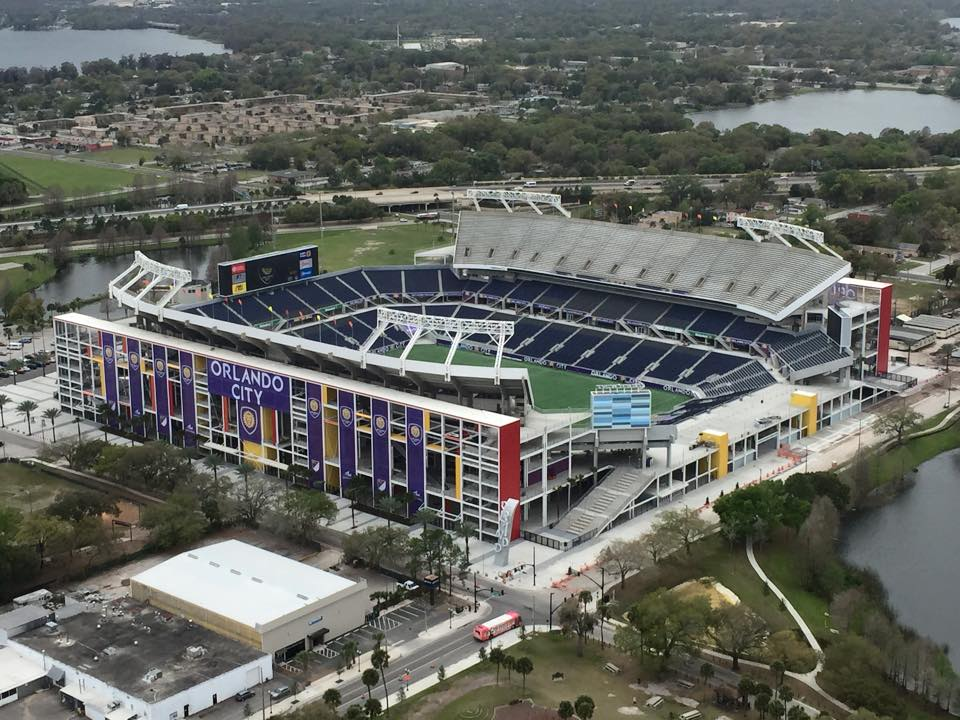
Camping World Stadium (pictured), Orlando City's home venue for five seasons

Before 2014, and from 2015-2016, Orlando City played its games at the 70,000 seat Camping World Stadium (which at the time was called the Citrus Bowl), located in Orlando, Florida. The club's 2012 season drew an average of over 6,900 fans per match, the highest average in the league. On February 15, 2013, the team announced that Fifth Third Bank had purchased naming rights for the stadium for Orlando City matches.

Due to the Citrus Bowl refurbishments, the team played the 2014 season at ESPN Wide World of Sports Complex. In 2014 the club had its lowest average attendance, 4,657 people a game up to July. In the opening home matches of the 2015 and 2016 seasons, Orlando City ran their "fill the bowl" campaign, which led to sell-out crowds of over 60,000. Orlando City averaged over 30,000 in attendance while using the stadium.

=== Current stadium ===
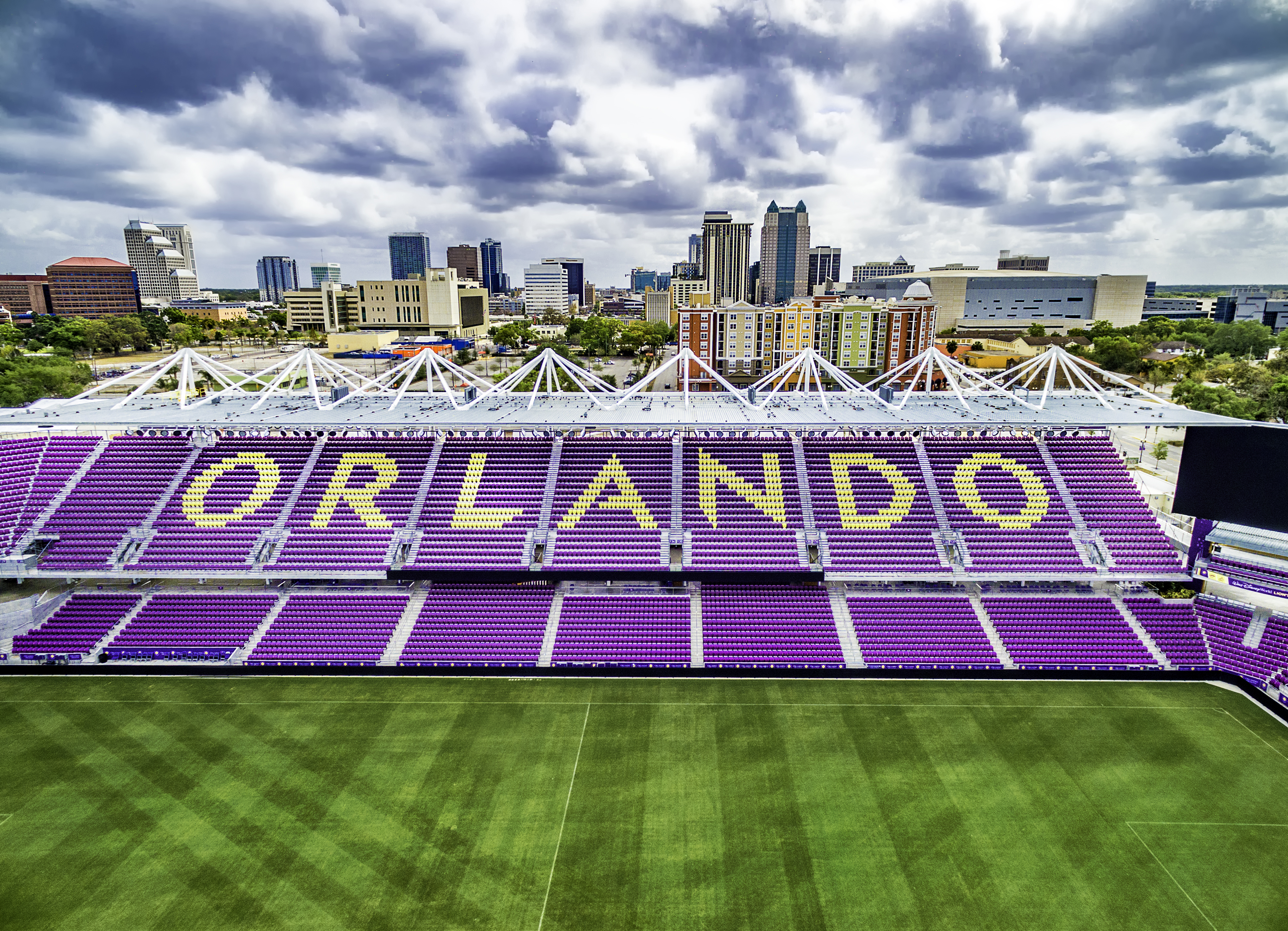
Inter.co Stadium

In April 2013, the City of Orlando purchased downtown land for $8.2 million to be used towards the construction of a $110 million MLS soccer stadium. However, in May, the Florida House of Representatives failed to vote on a bill that had passed the Senate that would have provided up to $30 million in state funds towards the stadium project. Phil Rawlins responded by expressing his intent to find alternative funding and keep seeking MLS expansion. The mechanism to allow for the sales tax rebate for the MLS team was ultimately passed on April 25, 2014.

The Orlando downtown soccer stadium moved closer to securing funding on August 8, 2013, when Orange County Mayor Teresa Jacobs and Orlando mayor Buddy Dyer reached an agreement on a deal to provide financial support for a variety of Orlando projects including the new MLS soccer stadium. The last piece in stadium funding was an October 2013 vote on using an existing tourism tax to fund the final quarter of the $80 million stadium project. On October 22, 2013, the Orange County Board of Commissioners voted 5–2 to approve the use of $20 million in tourist development tax funds to build an $84 million multi-purpose soccer stadium in downtown Orlando.

On May 29, 2015, after two years trying to get funding from the state of Florida, Flávio Augusto da Silva announced that the stadium would be privately funded in its entirety and would be owned and operated by the club. He also announced plans to increase capacity to between 25,000 and 28,000 and that the club would buy the initial location from the City of Orlando.

Orlando City moved to Inter.co Stadium (which at the time was called the Orlando City Stadium) at the beginning of the 2017 season. Its inaugural match was on March 5, 2017, when Orlando City hosted New York City FC. Cyle Larin scored the first goal in stadium history as Orlando City won 1–0 in front of a sellout crowd of 25,550.

In 2017, Inter.co Stadium became the first venue to host an MLS, NWSL, and USL team all in the same location.

The stadium has also played host to several nationally relevant matches. On October 6, 2017, the stadium hosted the United States men's national team for the first time in a 2018 FIFA World Cup qualifier against Panama. The following week the 2017 NWSL Championship game between North Carolina Courage and Portland Thorns was also played there. The United States women's national team made its stadium debut during the 2018 SheBelieves Cup.

On June 4, 2019, the naming rights to the stadium were sold to Florida-based time share and vacation rental company Exploria Resorts. As a result, the stadium was renamed Exploria Stadium.

On July 31, 2019, the stadium hosted the 2019 MLS All-Star Game between Atlético Madrid and the MLS All-Stars, which Atlético won 3–0.

On January 18, 2024, Inter&Co secured the naming rights to the stadium. On March 9, a trophy case called "The Vault" opened behind section 15, featuring trophies and other memorabilia. The name was later changed to "Inter.co Stadium" as part of a rebrand on July 23, 2026.

== Developmental system ==
Like most MLS teams, Orlando has a reserve affiliate by way of Orlando City B, which is based at Osceola County Stadium and currently competes in MLS Next Pro. Originally, after MLS dissolved its reserve league in 2014, Orlando City had an affiliation agreement with Louisville City FC, the club that bought the USL license from the owners of the Orlando City. The agreement provided that Orlando City will loan at least four players to Louisville City during the season. In 2016, Orlando City ended their affiliation with Louisville and began its own USL expansion franchise, Orlando City B, which originally played at the Titan Soccer Complex. The team played two seasons in USL before going on hiatus in 2018. The team returned in 2019 following a league restructure and became a founding member of USL League One, the third tier of the US Soccer pyramid, contesting two seasons and finishing in last place both years before going on hiatus again with a view to joining a potential relaunched MLS reserve league in the future. In OCB's absence in 2021, Orlando City resurrected their under-23 team to play in the developmental United Premier Soccer League. Following the decision by MLS to resurrect the reserve league system, it was announced that Orlando City B was returning in 2022 for the inaugural MLS Next Pro season.

In 2010, the founding year of Orlando City's original USL franchise, the team allied with Central Florida Kraze of the Premier Development League to assist player development. Following their successful first season, Orlando City acquired a controlling interest in the Kraze and renamed them Orlando City U-23. The team has a legacy that includes several current and past MLS players, and won the PDL Championship in 2004. In lieu of OCB's creation, the U-23 team was folded after the 2015 season.

After their 2011 season, Orlando City also acquired controlling interest in the Florida Soccer Alliance youth soccer club, renaming them Orlando City Youth Soccer Club. The club is now a member of the Elite Club National League (ECNL) and has several boys and girls teams competing at local, state and national level with age groups ranging from 8 to 18.

On January 17, 2025, Orlando City and Orlando Pride partnered with the YMCA of Central Florida to begin a soccer program called The Lions Pride Jr. for children ages 3–14 at all Central Florida YMCA locations that host youth soccer starting in February of that year. The stated goal of the program is to "share the joy of the game" while simultaneously "developing their skills and promoting healthy sportsmanship". Participants were given reversible jerseys for their games, with one side having the crest of Orlando City and the other having the crest of Orlando Pride, and all participants were given a complimentary ticket to both a City and Pride game for the 2025 season. Players were to make appearances at YMCA locations and all players and their families and the staff were given discounted tickets for home games.

=== Facilities ===
In May 2019, the team announced plans to move all of Orlando City's development pyramid to one single shared facility, creating a 20-acre (8.1 ha) training complex at Osceola Heritage Park to house the senior MLS team, OCB and Development Academy. The site, in Kissimmee, Florida, includes four practice fields—three natural grass and one artificial turf—a fitness, training and recovery center; a players' lounge, meal room and a film room as well as 30,000 square feet (2,800 m^{2}) of office space for working staff and facilities to support media operations. Osceola County Stadium was converted into a soccer-specific stadium and acts as the home stadium of OCB. It was a vision first set out by the club's executive vice president of soccer operations, Luiz Muzzi, upon his appointment in December 2018 as a means of solidifying the in-house pipeline from youth to professional. The facility was officially opened on January 17, 2020.

On November 17, 2025, Osceola County commissioners voted unanimously to begin negotiations with the team regarding the future development of Osceola Heritage Park. The proposed plan would see the training center expanded with additional fields and the eventual relocation of the Orlando Pride to the facility at the end of 2029 following the expiration of their lease at the Sylvan Lake Park training grounds in Seminole County. Additionally, the plan would see the team and county provide $50 million, evenly split between them, for improvements to the county's facilities and public-use area located within the facility and Osceola County Stadium. A 25-year lease of Osceola Heritage Park with an option to purchase the land at the expiration of the lease was also proposed and a tentative deadline of July 31, 2026, was set for negotiations.

== Colors and badge ==
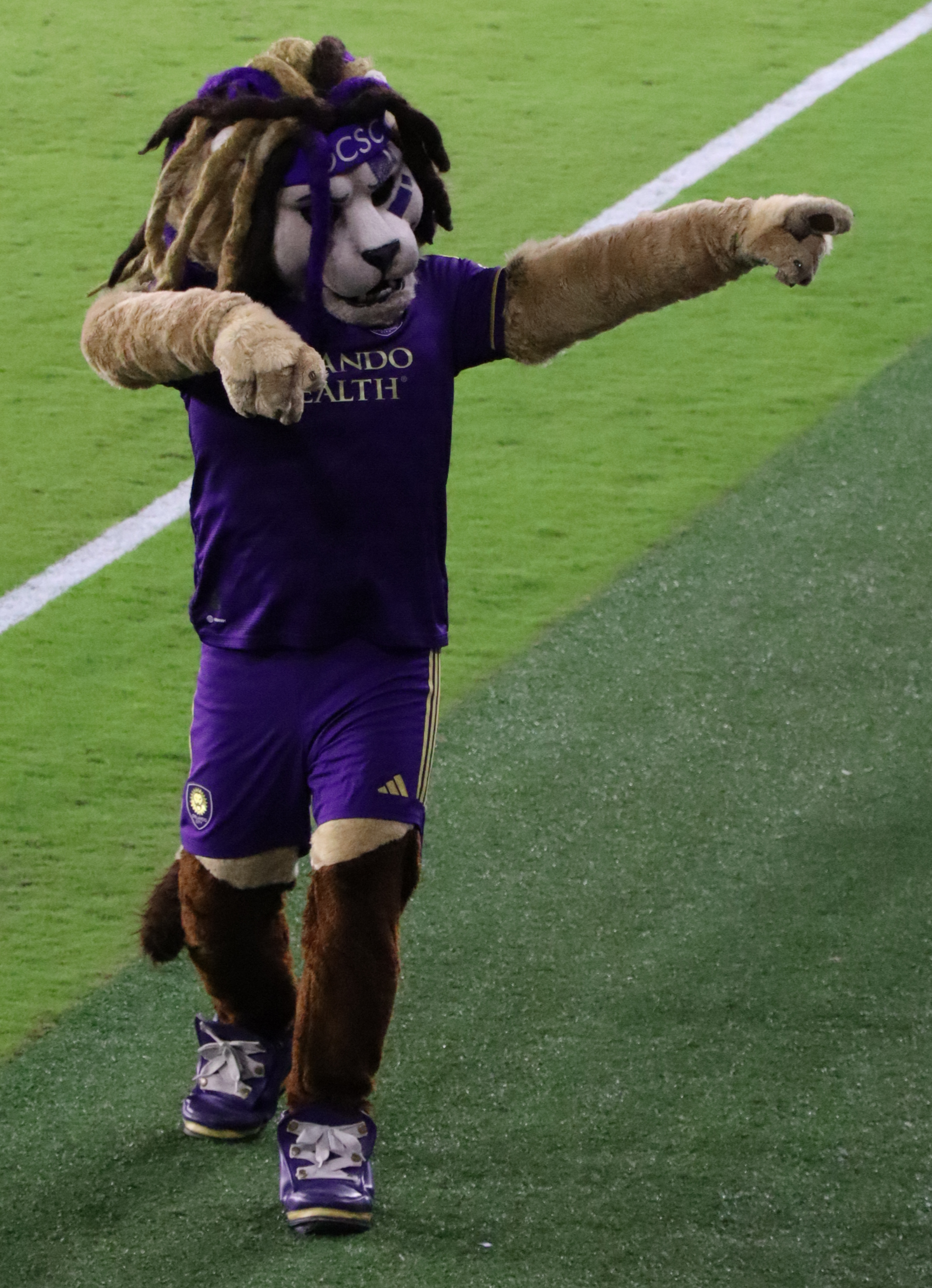
Kingston on the sideline during a match in 2024

Their first logo was unveiled during local morning news on Orlando TV station WOFL at 7:00am EST on December 16, 2010, and was launched at 10:00am with the team's website.

The club adopted the nickname "Lions" from previous uses of the nickname in Orlando, particularly the Orlando Lions. The colors chosen were "Regal Red", "Pride Purple", and "Championship Gold". The red represented their passion to perform at their best and their willingness to spill blood in the pursuit of their goals and the desire to "rule over" their opponents. The purple represented the pride of the city, fans, and the club, while the gold represented the trophies the club strived for. The design of the crest carried the lions over from the defunct Orlando Lions team, the original professional soccer team in Orlando which existed from 1985 to 1996. The three lions were meant to symbolize the group effort of the team and to connect the past and present of soccer in Orlando and to represent the defense, midfield, and attack of the team and to make it a pride of lions, which provided the team with the nickname "The Lions".

The branding was developed by Dixon Minear Design Marketing, the same firm that created the original branding for the Orlando Magic.

Their home uniform, white shirt with red shoulders and solid white shorts, was unveiled at their inaugural home friendly, and used without a sponsor through the 2011 Walt Disney World Pro Soccer Classic. Their away outfit consisted of a red shirt with white armpits and solid red shorts. At the home uniform unveiling, they also announced Orlando Health as their uniform sponsor. Their uniform brand was Lotto.

For the club's ascension to MLS, the Lions unvield a new logo. The main aspects, including the purple color scheme and lion ident, carried over from their first logo. New features and changes were introduced to represent the transition of the franchise into a first division team. The logo consists of a gold Lion face with 21 sun flares making up its mane sitting within a purple shield. The Lion logo and purple color scheme pays homage to the Orlando Lions. The number of flares represents the club's position as the twenty-first team in MLS, while the sun-shaped mane is in reference to Florida's nickname as The Sunshine State. The team name is also seen in the crest in white.

=== Mascot ===
Orlando City's mascot is Kingston, an anthropomorphized and "bulked up" lion complete with brown and purple dreadlocks. He has purple war paint on his face, wears a headband with the team initials on and is often dressed in the team's uniform.

=== Sponsorship ===
Season	Kit manufacturer	Shirt sponsor	Ref.
2011–2012	Umbro	Orlando Health	
2013–2014	Lotto	Orlando Health	
2015–present	Adidas	Orlando Health	

Orlando Health has been the official shirt sponsor for Orlando City since the team's inception as a USL franchise in 2010. In 2013, Orlando Health extended its partnership with the club, becoming the first jersey partner in MLS history to commit to an expansion club prior to its admittance to the league. Adidas also signed on as the club's kit provider for the 2015 season as per the league-wide deal made by MLS. The deal means that there are no longer third kits and only one kit (between the home and away) is permitted to change per season, rotating on an annual basis.

== Club culture ==
=== Supporters ===
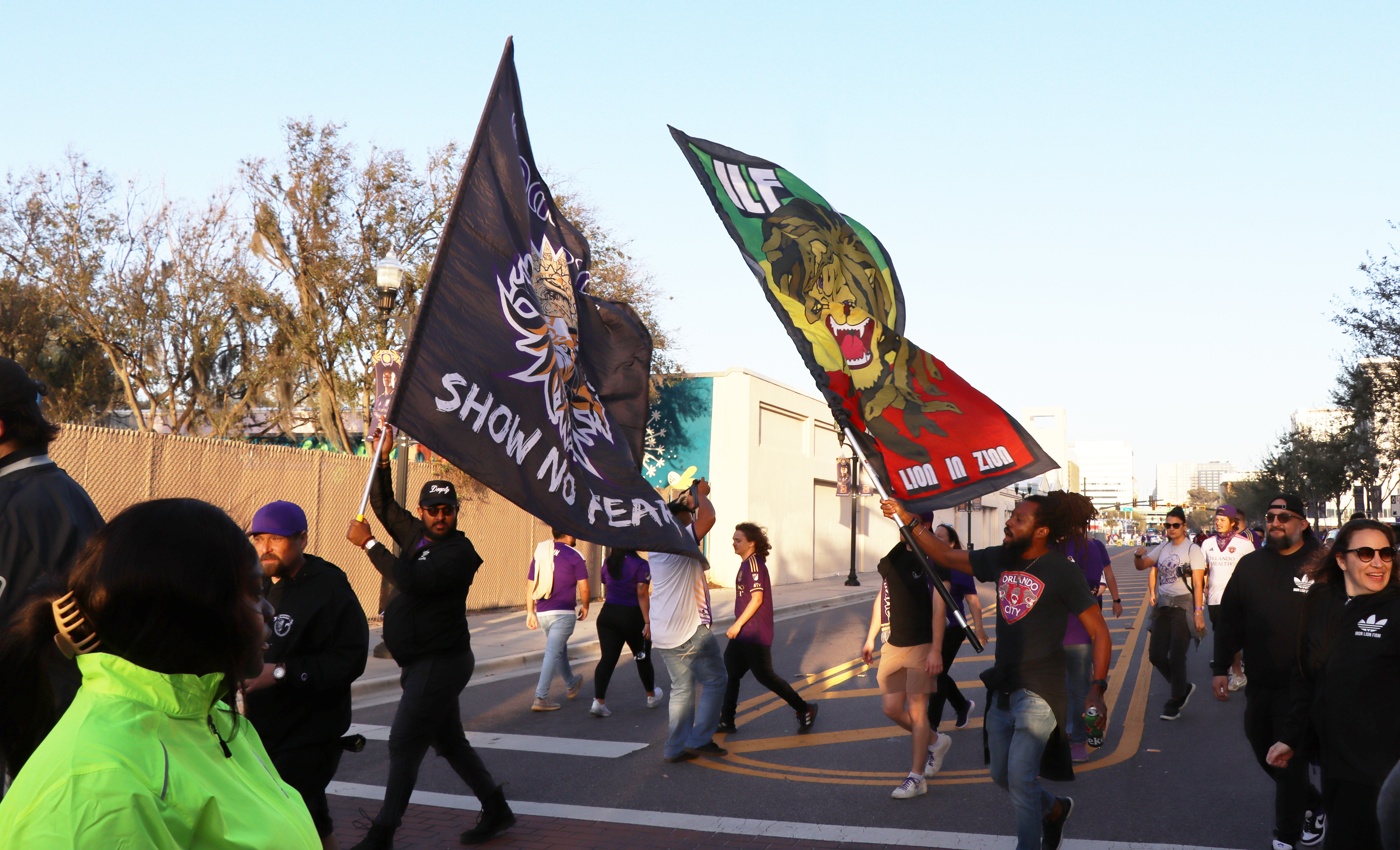
Orlando City ultras outside the stadium in February 2024

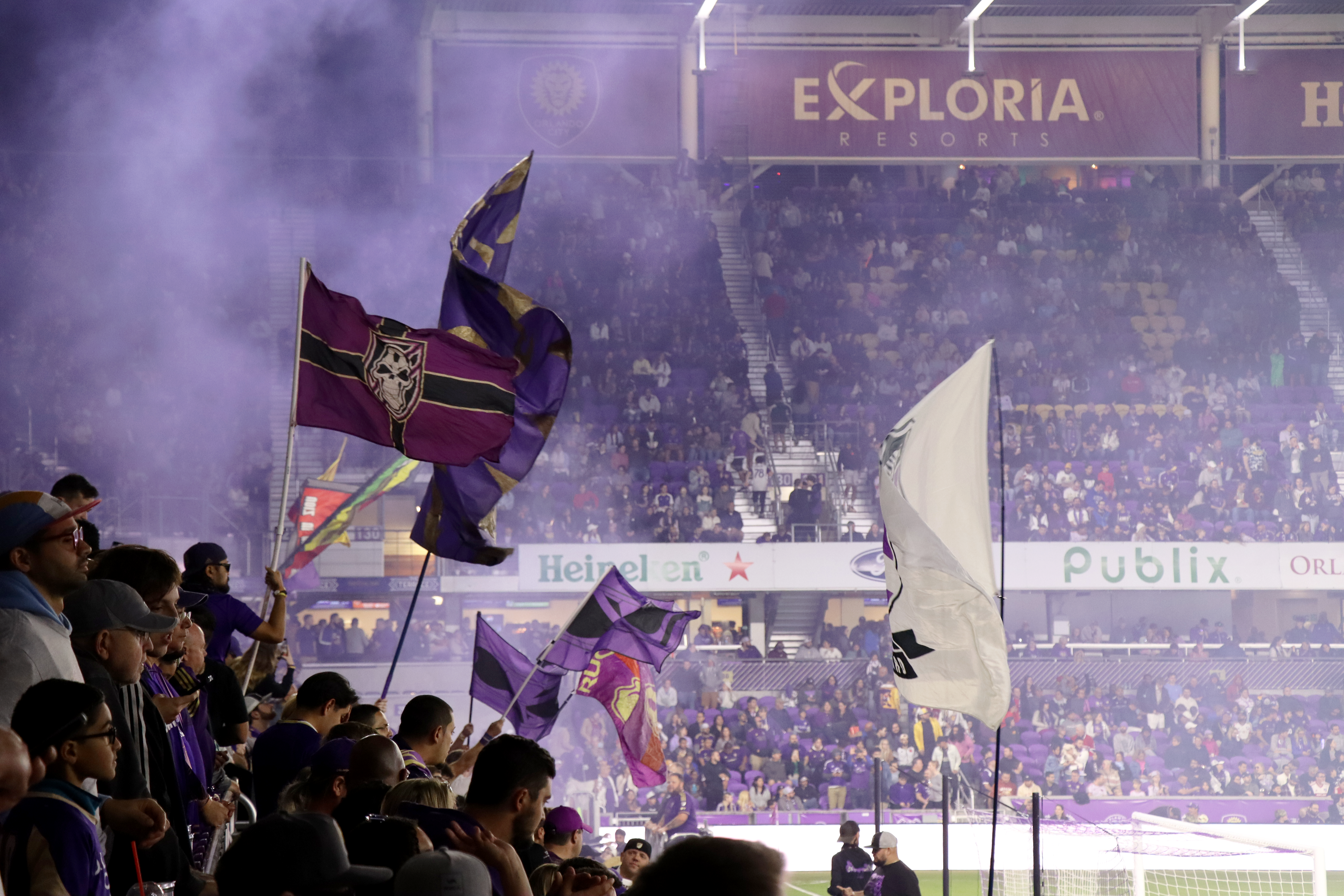
Orlando City's The Wall in February 2024

The club had sold over 13,000 season tickets before playing its first match in March 2015, selling all 14,000 available season tickets later that month. As of the 2017 season, Orlando City's season ticket base stands at a cap of 18,000. On March 8, 2015, 62,510 people were in attendance for Orlando's home opener versus New York City FC, a record of any expansion team, and finished the year with the second-highest average attendance figures behind only Seattle Sounders, again setting a new record for an expansion team.

The club has two major active supporters groups:

- The Ruckus is the oldest of these groups, whose basis was formed in 2009 as the "Orlando Soccer Supporters Club" without an affiliation to any particular soccer team. They occupy section 120.
- The Iron Lion Firm, which separated from The Ruckus prior to the start of City's first season, occupies section 121. Another group, The 407, was merged into the Iron Lion Firm prior to the start of the 2014 season.

The club's two major active supporters groups, combine forces on game days to create "The Wall", now housed in the safe standing section. Additionally, the club also has officially recognized international fan clubs in both Brazil and the United Kingdom.

=== Rivalries ===
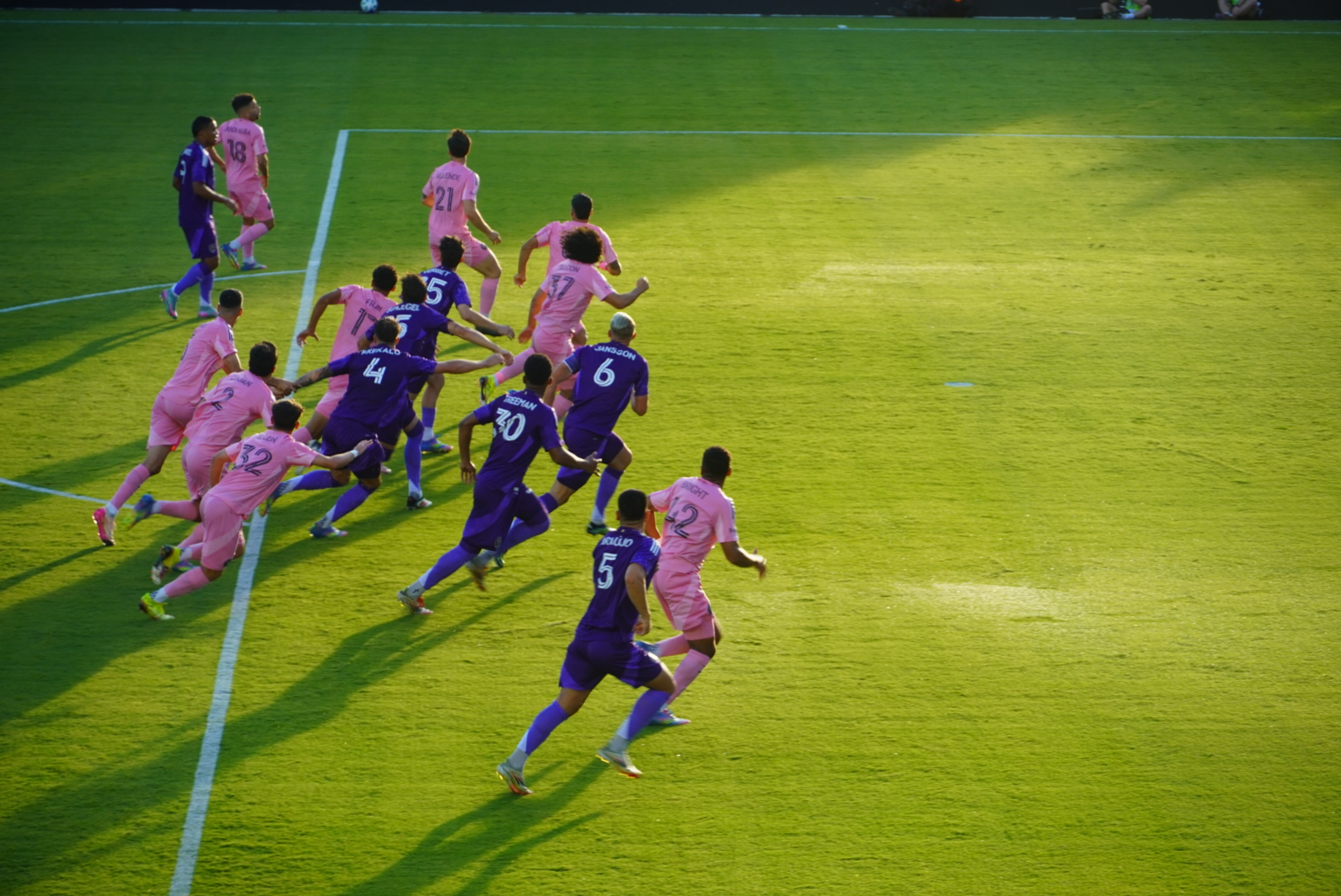
Orlando City and Inter Miami players race for an incoming ball in 2025

Orlando City does not compete for any official MLS rivalry trophy.

The club has an intrastate rivalry with Inter Miami, currently the team's closest neighbors and only other Florida-based team in MLS. Orlando City joined MLS in 2015 but had to wait until its sixth season to play a first interstate match against an MLS opponent following the introduction of Inter Miami as an expansion franchise in 2020. Unlike a lot of rivalries in Major League Soccer, there is no name for this series although several have been mooted to little to no success. Prior to the creation of Inter Miami, Orlando City had established a geographical rivalry with Atlanta United as the only two MLS clubs in the southeastern region of the United States when Atlanta joined MLS in 2017. From the beginning, the series has seen several fan incidents as well as player and front office animosity including both teams banning the others' supporters groups.

Before Orlando City had obvious geographical rivalries, there were several competitive rivalries that formed, particularly with regular Eastern Conference opponents. New York City FC was considered an immediate de facto rival by virtue of being a fellow 2015 expansion franchise although it was felt to a lesser degree by New York City as they already had multiple close geographical rivals. Nevertheless, the two teams made their MLS debut against each other with 10-man Orlando rescuing a dramatic 1–1 draw in stoppage time, and used each other as a bench mark in that first campaign. Tensions peaked when the two teams met in the 2020 MLS Cup playoffs, a chaotic game that saw NYCFC's season end in farcical fashion and re-established Orlando's status as a rival in the eyes of New York City fans. Some of Orlando City's most intense and controversial moments in the inaugural season occurred against Columbus Crew, leaving Orlando fans feeling aggrieved and sowed the seeds for a potential minor rivalry although more uneventful subsequent meetings quelled these early sentiments.

== Players ==
=== Roster ===
As of August 27, 2026

Note: Flags indicate national team as defined under FIFA eligibility rules; some limited exceptions apply. Players may hold more than one non-FIFA nationality.

No.	Pos.	Nation	Player
3	DF	ESP	Adrián Marín
4	DF	SLO	David Brekalo
5	MF	BRA	Luis Otávio
6	DF	SWE	Robin Jansson (captain)
7	FW	FRA	Antoine Griezmann (DP)
8	MF	PAR	Braian Ojeda
9	FW	USA	Daryl Dike
10	MF	ARG	Martín Ojeda (DP)
11	FW	BRA	Tiago
12	GK	VEN	Javier Otero (HG)
14	FW	TTO	Tyrese Spicer
16	MF	PER	Wilder Cartagena
19	DF	USA	Zakaria Taifi (HG)
20	MF	COL	Eduard Atuesta

No.	Pos.	Nation	Player
21	DF	USA	Nolan Miller
22	FW	USA	Justin Ellis (HG)
23	FW	USA	Harvey Sarajian
24	DF	USA	Griffin Dorsey
27	DF	BRA	Vinícius Nogueira (on loan from Ludogorets Razgrad)
33	DF	CAN	Clovis Archange (HG)
35	MF	FRA	Joran Gerbet
40	GK	USA	Tristan Himes (HG)
44	DF	BRA	Bernardo Rhein (HG)
57	DF	BRA	Iago Teodoro
65	MF	VEN	Gustavo Caraballo (HG)
71	GK	CAN	Maxime Crépeau
77	FW	COL	Iván Angulo
87	FW	CRO	Marco Pašalić (DP)

=== Out on loan ===
Note: Flags indicate national team as defined under FIFA eligibility rules; some limited exceptions apply. Players may hold more than one non-FIFA nationality.

No.	Pos.	Nation	Player
25	MF	USA	Colin Guske (HG; on loan to Real Salt Lake)
34	FW	JPN	Yutaro Tsukada (on loan to Rhode Island FC)

No.	Pos.	Nation	Player
—	FW	COL	Nicolás Rodríguez (on loan to Atlético Nacional)

=== Reserve ===
As of August 12, 2026
Players with at least one first-team appearance for Orlando City.

Note: Flags indicate national team as defined under FIFA eligibility rules; some limited exceptions apply. Players may hold more than one non-FIFA nationality.

No.	Pos.	Nation	Player
38	MF	GHA	Issah Haruna

== Staff ==
As of April 17, 2026

Executive
Majority owner and chairman	Mark Wilf
Majority owner and vice-chair	Zygi Wilf
Majority owner and vice-chair	Leonard Wilf
General manager and sporting director	Ricardo Moreira
Coaching staff
Head coach	Martín Perelman (interim)
Assistant coach	Manual Goldberg (interim)
Assistant coach	Sebastián Setti (interim)
Strength and conditioning coach	Sandro Graham (interim)
Goalkeeping coach	César Baena

=== Ownership ===
The founding ownership group was announced on March 4, 2010, as Orlando Pro Soccer. It was affiliated with the Orlando Titans National Lacrosse League team. However, the Titans ran into financial difficulties. Steve Donner left the Titans club after the 2010 NLL season to focus on the soccer effort. In October 2010, the Orlando Pro Soccer USL rights were purchased by Phil Rawlins, a board member of English Premier League club Stoke City, who moved the Austin Aztex organization to Orlando.

The club's next majority owner was Flávio Augusto da Silva. Da Silva, founder of the Wise Up ESL program, joined the club's ownership group on February 17, 2013. After the club's successful expansion bid into Major League Soccer, he became the club's majority owner.

There are many other individuals in the ownership group, including Phil Rawlins, the club's President; John Bonner, the club's chairman; and Brendan Flood, a board member of English club Burnley.

On May 12, 2021, Da Silva announced he was in advanced negotiations with Zygi and Mark Wilf, owners of National Football League franchise Minnesota Vikings, for the sale of the club including the Orlando Pride, Inter.co Stadium, and other related soccer assets. The combined value of the deal was estimated at $400–450 million. The sale was officially completed on July 21, 2021.

== Honors ==
Domestic
Competitions	Titles	Seasons
U.S. Open Cup	1	2022
USL Pro Championship	2^{s}	2011, 2013
USL Pro Commissioner's Cup	3	2011, 2012, 2014
USL Pro American Division	1	2011

Notes

- record
- ^{s} shared record

== Team records ==
This is a partial list of the last five seasons completed by Orlando City. For the full season-by-season history, see List of Orlando City SC seasons.

=== List of seasons ===
Season	League											Position		Playoffs	USOC	Continental	Other		Average attendance	Top goalscorer(s)		Head coach(es)
Season	Div	League	Pld	W	D	L	GF	GA	GD	Pts	PPG	Conf.	Overall	Playoffs	USOC	Continental	Other		Average attendance	Name(s)	Goals	Head coach(es)
2022	1	MLS	34	14	6	14	44	53	–9	48	1.41	7th	13th	R1	W	DNQ	DNQ		17,283	(Uruguay) Facundo Torres	13	(Colombia) Óscar Pareja
2023	1	MLS	34	18	9	7	55	39	+16	63	1.82	2nd	2nd	QF	R4	Ro16	Leagues Cup	Ro32	20,590	(United States) Duncan McGuire	15	(Colombia) Óscar Pareja
2024	1	MLS	34	15	7	12	59	50	+9	52	1.53	4th	9th	SF	DNE	Ro16	Leagues Cup	Ro32	22,804	(Uruguay) Facundo Torres	20	(Colombia) Óscar Pareja
2025	1	MLS	34	14	11	9	63	51	+12	53	1.56	9th	14th	WC	Ro16	DNQ	Leagues Cup	4th	20,573	(Argentina) Martín Ojeda	20	(Colombia) Óscar Pareja
2026	1	MLS	34	13	7	14	63	78	–15	46	1.35	8th	15th	WC	Semi-final	DNW	Leagues Cup	League phase	20,090	(Argentina) Martín Ojeda	17	(Colombia) Óscar Pareja (Note: Until March 11) (Argentina) Martín Perelman (interim) (Note: From March 11)
Total	–	–	465	213	128	158	797	728	+69	767	1.38	–	–	–	–	–	–		–	(Argentina) Martín Ojeda	51	–

1. Avg. attendance include statistics from league matches only.
2. Top goalscorer(s) includes all goals scored in MLS, Playoffs, U.S. Open Cup, MLS is Back Tournament, Leagues Cup, CONCACAF Champions League, FIFA Club World Cup, and other competitive matches.

=== North American record ===
Season	Competition	Round	Country	Opponent	Home	Away	Aggregate
2023	CONCACAF Champions League	Round of 16	(Mexico)	Tigres UANL	1–1	0–0	1–1 (Note: Lost on away goals)
2024	CONCACAF Champions Cup	Round one	(Canada)	Cavalry FC	3–1	3–0	6–1
2024	CONCACAF Champions Cup	Round of 16	(Mexico)	Tigres UANL	0–0	2–4	2–4

=== Head coaches ===
- Only competitive games counted. Includes USL Pro regular season, USL Pro playoffs, MLS regular season, MLS playoffs, MLS is Back Tournament, Leagues Cup, CONCACAF Champions League/Cup, and U.S. Open Cup.

As of match played March 7, 2026

All-time Orlando City coaching stats
Name	Nationality	From	To	P	W	D	L	GF	GA	Win% (Note: Win% is rounded to two decimal places)
Adrian Heath	England	October 25, 2010	July 6, 2016	200	108	44	48	296	178	54.00
Bobby Murphy (interim)	United States	July 7, 2016	July 23, 2016	4	0	3	1	4	6	0.00
Jason Kreis	United States	July 24, 2016	June 15, 2018	65	22	13	30	90	117	33.85
Bobby Murphy (interim)	United States	June 16, 2018	July 1, 2018	3	0	1	2	1	7	0.00
James O'Connor	Ireland	July 2, 2018	October 7, 2019	56	13	14	29	69	95	23.21
Óscar Pareja	Colombia	December 4, 2019	March 11, 2026	240	102	67	71	381	328	42.50
Martín Perelman (interim)	Argentina	March 11, 2026	present	0	0	0	0	0	0	—

=== Club captains ===
Years	Name	Nation
2015–2017	Kaká	Brazil
2018	Jonathan Spector	United States
2019–2021	Nani	Portugal
2022–2023	Mauricio Pereyra	Uruguay
2024–present	Robin Jansson	Sweden

== Affiliated clubs ==
=== Orlando City ownership ===
- Orlando Pride (NWSL)
- Orlando City B (MLS Next Pro)

=== Technical partnerships ===
- Sporting CP
- Black Knight Football Club UK Limited
  - AFC Bournemouth, Auckland FC, Hibernian FC, FC Lorient, and Moreirense

== See also ==
- Expansion of Major League Soccer
