= Wilfie =

Wilfie is a nickname of:

- Wilf Greaves (born 1935), Canadian retired boxer
- Wilfrid Reid (1884-1973), English golfer and golf course designer
- Wilfrid Wilfie Starr (1908-1976), Canadian National Hockey League player

== See also ==
- Wilf
