= Wilfrith =

Wilfrith is a masculine given name which may refer to:

- Wilfrith I (bishop of Worcester) (died c. 744)
- Wilfrith II (bishop of Worcester) (died 929)
- Wilfrith Elstob (1888–1918), English First World War recipient of the Victoria Cross
- Wilfrith Green (1872–1937), Welsh officer in the British Army and British Indian Army

== See also ==
- Wilfred (given name)
