= AWA Remco Action Figure line =

1980s American toy line

AWA action figure line
- Type: Action figures
- Invented by: Remco
- Company: Remco
- Country: United States
- Availability: 1984–86
- Materials: Plastic
- Features: AWA wrestlers

The AWA Remco Action Figure Line was an action figure toyline based on the wrestlers of the now defunct American Wrestling Association Promotion, or AWA. They were made by the toy company Remco from 1985 to 1986. The toys were made of a solid plastic pose, with moveable waists, legs, arms, and heads. Most came with accessories, from outfits to championship belts. This was actually the first line of wrestling figures available for sale in the United States, preceding the very popular WWF Wrestling Superstars line from LJN which also debuted in 1985.

This set is unique for releasing figures in 2 or 3 packs as opposed to single figure packs. the only figures available in single figure packs was the final series in the collection, the highly collectible Mat Mania series released in 1986.

The set has become increasingly valuable in recent years. The most common figures are the figures released the earliest, and the most sought after are the final series. Loose figures are valuable if they come with the original accessories. The Mat Mania series released in 1986 have been sold on eBay for anywhere from $400-$1200 MOC.

Referee's Nasty Ned and Curly Brown heads were redesigned using the 1982 Remco Lost World of the Warlord MIKOLA and MACHISTE 6" Action Figures.

== The Complete Collection ==
=== Series 1 (Yellow Banner)- 1984 ===
- The Fabulous Ones - Steve Keirn & Stan Lane (red/white plastic vest and bowties, 2-pack includes AWA Souvenir Badge)
- The Road Warriors - Road Warrior Animal & Road Warrior Hawk (with & without Tag Team Belts, black pants and collars, 2-pack includes AWA Souvenir Badge)
- The High Flyers - Greg Gagne & Jim Brunzell (Red and white collared jackets with screen printing, 2-pack includes AWA Souvenir Ring)
- Rick Martel vs. Baron von Raschke (Martel includes a white collar-less jacket and heavyweight belt, von Rschke includes a red robe and black belt, 2-pack includes AWA Souvenir Ring)

=== Series 2 (Red Banner)- 1985 ===
- Gagne's Raiders - Greg Gagne & Curt Hennig (Gagne has two different head-sculpts and both figures came with three alternative camouflage patterns, body variants include black trunks or black tights, 2-pack includes free sticker)
- The Long Riders - Bill Irwin & Scott Irwin (both Riders came with a white robe, helmet and glasses, helmets will vary including one closed cap and one open cap, body variants include muscular or flabby body and Scott Irwin had a black vest over his white robe, 2-pack includes free sticker)
- Rick Martel vs. Baron von Raschke (Martel includes a white collar-less jacket, von Raschke includes a red robe and black belt, 2-pack includes free sticker)
- Larry Zbyszko vs. Ric Flair (Zbyszko includes a red collared jacket, Flair includes a white robe, 2-pack includes free sticker)

=== Series 3 (3-Packs) - 1985 ===
- The Road Warriors & Paul Ellering (Road Warriors include black chaps and collars, Ellering includes screen printed shirt, 3-pack includes Ringside Interview, a print variant in black and blue ink)
- "Gorgeous" Jimmy Garvin, Steve Regal, & their Valet Precious (Garvin variants include muscular or flabby body, Precious includes spray can, 3-pack includes Ringside Interview, a print variant in black and blue ink)
- The Fabulous Freebirds - Michael Hayes, Terry Gordy, & Buddy Roberts (Gordy variants include a muscular or flabby body with a secondary paint variant for the muscular body for single and double lined socks, Gordy include red vest, Hayes includes blue/red jacket, Roberts includes blue/red jacket, 3-pack includes Ringside Interview, a print variant in black and blue ink)

Fight to the Finish 2 Packs with VHS Cassette

- Steve Regal vs. Curt Hennig
- Buddy Roberts vs. Greg Gagne
- Michael Hayes vs. Rick Martel

=== Series 4 (Black Cards)- 1986 ===
Greatest Grudge Matches 2 Packs

- Nick Bockwinkel vs. Larry Zbyszko (Zbyszko includes a white collared jacket, Bockwinkel includes white kneepads and a white collarless jacket)
- Scott Hall vs. "Gorgeous" Jimmy Garvin (Garvin includes a blue robe, there is no body variant for Garvin, Hall includes a Black jacket with gold fringe)
- Stan Hansen vs. Jerry Blackwell (Hansen includes a plastic cowbody hat, leather chaps, and vest, Blackwell includes black cloth jumpsuit)
- Carlos Colón vs. Abdullah the Butcher (Colon variants include orange and red-colored singlets and Butcher includes red pants and red boots)

Rings and Accessories - 1985

- Allstar Wrestling Ring (Wood ring base)
- Battle Royal Playset with 7 figures (Cardboard ring base figures include Road Warriors Animal & Hawk, the Fabulous Ones Stan Lane, and Steve Keirn, Rick Martel, Baron von Raschke, and a referee. Referee variants include Curley Brown, Nasty Ned, or Dick Woehrle. The playset also includes a $100,000 "Winner Take All" Playcheck, Battle Royal Poster, and AWA Interview Booklet Playset includes 3 title belts)
- 2nd Battle Royal Playset with 7 figures (Cardboard ring base figures include Ric Flair, Larry Zbyszko, the Fabulous Ones Stan Lane and Steve Keirn, Rick Martel, Baron von Raschke, and a referee. Referee variants include Curley Brown, Nasty Ned, or Dick Woehrle. The playset also includes a $100,000 "Winner Take All" Playcheck, Battle Royal Poster, and AWA Interview Booklet Playset includes 3 title belts)
- Steel Cage Match Playset (Plastic ring base, includes updated plastic ring posts, turnbuckles, steel cage walls, corner clips, door lock, and two forks)

Thumbsters - 1985

- Ric Flair vs Larry Zbyszko
- Greg Gagne vs Road Warrior Hawk
- Rick Martel vs Road Warrior Animal

Championship Belt - 1985 Could hold up to 5 different figures

Power Slam Wrestling VCR Game - 1985

=== Series 5 (Single Card Release) - 1986 ===
Mat Mania (All Mat Mania figures are stamped with All Star Wrestling)

- Shawn Michaels (with t-shirt and glasses)
- Marty Jannetty (with t-shirt and glasses)
- Nord The Barbarian (with cloth kneepads, vest and chain)
- Boris Zhukov (with red singlet and chain)
- Doug Somers (with name embroidered on the back of his black jacket)
- Buddy Rose (with name embroidered on the back of his black jacket)
- Dick Woehrle (Had two different eye color variants)
- Sheik Adnan Al-Kaissie (with red cloth outfit, head dress and gold belt)

Re-Releases on Mat Mania Card

- Nick Bockwinkel
- Ric Flair
- Paul Ellering

Mini Mashers - 1986 Came in a 12 pack, 8 pack or 4 pack with assorted AWA colored silicone plastic figures, 12 figures in all: Animal, Hawk, Scott Hall, Boris Zhukov, Stan Hansen, Shawn Michaels, Marty Jannetty, John Nord, Larry Zybszko, Ric Flair, Curt Hennig, and Nick Bockwinkel.
