= Saul Robbins =

American toy manufacturer

- Born: February 16, 1922; New York City, U.S.
- Died: June 13, 2010 (aged 88); Verona, New Jersey, U.S.
- Education: Rutgers University
- Occupation: Toy manufacturer
- Known for: Co-founder of Remco
- Spouse: Ruth Fern
- Children: 2
- Relatives: Isaac Heller (cousin); Leonard Wilf (son-in-law)

Saul Robbins (February 16, 1922 – June 13, 2010) was an American toy manufacturer, the co-founder of Remco, with his cousin Isaac Heller.

== Personal life ==
Saul Robbins was born on February 16, 1922, in Brooklyn, New York. He earned a bachelor's degree from Rutgers University. Robbins served in the US Army in the Second World War.

== Career ==
In 1949, he co-founded the toy company Remco in Newark, New Jersey, with his cousin Isaac Heller. The name was a contraction of "REMote COntrol", and its first products were children's walkie-talkies. Heller had been a U.S. Navy electronics technician, and they started by buying large amounts of military surplus and "transforming it into toys that could zoom, soar or otherwise move."

Until the 1960s, they only made toys for boys, and they were the first toy company to use television advertising. Their toys included the Whirlybird helicopter, the Barracuda atomic submarine, the Johnny Reb cannon, the Dick Tracy wrist radio, the Screaming Mee Mee-e rifle and Mr. Kelly's Automatic Car Wash.

Robbins was president of the Toy Manufacturers Association of America, and of the YM-YWHA of Metrowest.

== Personal life ==
Robbins and his wife Ruth Fern had two children, Ralph Robbins and Dr Marcia Robbins-Wilf. His daughter Marcia Robbins-Wilf was married to Leonard Wilf.

Saul Robbins died at his home in Verona, New Jersey on June 13, 2010, aged 88.
