= Garden Homes =

American real estate development company

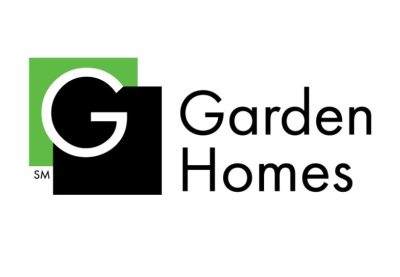
- Company type: Private
- Industry: Real estate
- Founded: 1954
- Founder: Harry Wilf, Joseph Wilf
- Headquarters: Short Hills, New Jersey, United States
- Key people: Jonathan Wilf, Leonard Wilf, Mark Wilf, Orin Wilf, Zygmunt Wilf

Garden Homes is an American real estate development company, founded in 1954. Garden Homes owns and manages over 50,000 apartments and over 25 million square feet of retail, office, and hotel space.

Garden Homes, and its subsidiaries, offer home rentals in Arizona, California, Florida, New Jersey, New York and Connecticut. Subsidiaries include Garden Commercial Properties and Skyline Developers.

== History ==
Garden Homes was founded in 1954 by the brothers Harry and Joseph Wilf, and is now run by Leonard, Zygmunt, Mark, Orin and Jonathan Wilf.

Garden Homes is based in Short Hills, New Jersey, and the Wilf family has a net worth of US$5 billion as of 2015.
