= Wilfried =

Wilfried, Wilfrid
- Gender: Male

Origin
- Origin: (germanic) Willo (will) and Fridu (peace) in German
- Meaning: "He who wants peace"

Other names
- Related names: Wilfred, Wifred

Wilfried is a masculine German given name derived from Germanic roots meaning "will" and "peace" (Wille and Frieden in German). The English spelling is Wilfrid. Wilfred and Wifred (also Wifredo) are closely related to Wilfried with the same roots (Old English wil and frið).

- Wilfried Auerbach (1960–2025), Austrian rower
- Wilfried Benjamin Balima (born 1985), Burkinabé footballer
- Wilfried Behre (born 1956), German artist
- Wilfried Bingangoye (born 1985), Gabonese sprinter
- Wilfried Bock (21st century), German biathlete
- Wilfried Bony (born 1989), Ivorian football player
- Wilfried Böse (1949–1976), German terrorist
- Wilfried Brauer (1937–2014), German computer scientist
- Wilfried Brookhuis (born 1961), Dutch footballer
- Wilfried Cretskens (born 1976), Belgian cyclist
- Wilfried Daim (1923–2016), Austrian psychologist
- Wilfried Dalmat (born 1982), French footballer
- Wilfried David (1946–2015), Belgian cyclist
- Wilfried Dietrich (1933–1992), German wrestler
- Wilfried Domoraud (born 1988), French footballer
- Wilfried Urbain Elvis Endzanga (born 1980), Congolese footballer
- Wilfried Erdmann (1940–2023), German sailor
- Wilfried Gnonto (born 2003), Italian footballer
- Wilfried Gröbner (born 1949), German footballer
- Wilfried Hannes (born 1957), German footballer
- Wilfried Hartung (born 1953), German swimmer
- Wilfried Herling (1920–1943), German pilot
- Murad Wilfried Hofmann (1931–2020), German diplomat and author
- Wilfried Huber (born 1970), Italian luger
- Wilfried Klaus (born 1941), German actor
- Wilfried Kohlars (1939–2019), German footballer
- Wilfried Lemke (1946–2024), German official of the United Nations
- Wilfried Maaß (1931–2005), German politician
- Wilfried Martens (1936–2013), Belgian politician
- Wilfried Nancy (born 1977) French professional football manager
- Wilfried Nelissen (born 1970), Belgian cyclist
- Wilfried Niflore (born 1981), French footballer
- Wilfried Pallhuber (born 1967), Italian biathlete
- Wilfried Paulsen (1828–1901), German chess player
- Wilfried Peeters (born 1964), Belgian cyclist
- Wilfried Puis (1943–1981), Belgian footballer
- Wilfried Richter (1916-1981), German military officer
- Wilfried Sanou (born 1984), Burkinabé footballer
- Wilfried Sauerland (born 1940), German boxing promoter
- Wilfried Schmid (born 1943), German-American mathematician
- Wilfried Soltau (1912–1995), German canoeist
- Wilfried Stephan (born 1955), German canoeist
- Wilfried Strik-Strikfeldt (1896–1977), German soldier
- Wilfried Tekovi (born 1989), Togolese footballer
- Wilfried Thurner (1927–1981), Austrian bobsledder
- Jo-Wilfried Tsonga, French tennis player
- Wilfried Van Moer (1945–2021), Belgian footballer
- Wilfried Wesch (1940–2024), German racewalker
- Wilfried Zaha (born 1992), Ivorian-born footballer

== See also ==
- Wilfred (given name)
- Wilfredo
- Wilf
