= Zygi Wilf =

American businessman and sports team owner (born 1950)

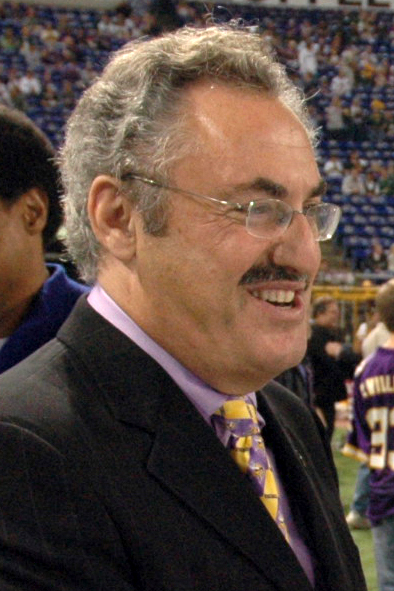
- Wilf in August 2007
- Born: April 22, 1950 (age 76); West Berlin, Germany
- Education: Fairleigh Dickinson University (BA); New York Law School (JD)
- Occupation: Real estate developer
- Known for: Chairman & co-owner of the Minnesota Vikings
- Spouse: Audrey Wilf
- Parent(s): Joseph Wilf; Elizabeth Wilf
- Relatives: Mark Wilf (brother); Leonard Wilf (cousin)
- Football career

Minnesota Vikings
- Title: Owner

Career history
- Minnesota Vikings (2005–present) Chairman & co-owner

Zygmunt "Zygi" Wilf (born April 22, 1950) is an American billionaire businessman and real estate developer. He is the chairman and co-owner of the NFL's Minnesota Vikings and the majority owner of Major League Soccer's Orlando City SC.

== Early life ==
Wilf was born in West Berlin on April 22, 1950. His parents, Joseph (1925–2016) and Elizabeth Wilf (1932–), are Polish Jews and Holocaust survivors from Nazi occupied Poland. The Wilf family immigrated to the United States from Europe in the early 1950s and settled in Hillside, New Jersey. After a brief stint as a used car salesmen, Joseph and his brother Harry Wilf began purchasing apartment buildings and renting units. Eventually, the brothers began building single-family homes and founded Garden Homes. A real estate developer, his two main family-run businesses, Garden Homes and Garden Commercial Properties, have constructed some 25,000 homes in 39 states across the country since their initial ventures; the two entities and their affiliates own and manage 25,000,000 square feet (2,300,000 m^{2}) in retail and business property.

Wilf attended Fairleigh Dickinson University, earning a bachelor's degree in economics in 1971, and later earned a J.D. degree from New York Law School in Manhattan in June 1974. President Richard Joel presented him with an honorary doctorate from Yeshiva University in May 2010 at the university's 79th commencement. Zygi, along with his brother Mark Wilf, serve as trustees of Yeshiva University. He received an honorary degree at Fairleigh Dickinson's 69th Commencement Ceremony in May 2012.

== Career ==
After working as an attorney, Wilf joined the family business and became head of one of the company's affiliates, Garden Commercial Properties. Wilf has grown the company from four shopping centers in Northern New Jersey to over a hundred properties, including several large malls. In addition to the commercial properties, the Garden companies also own and manage 90,000 apartment units around the country.

=== Minnesota Vikings ===
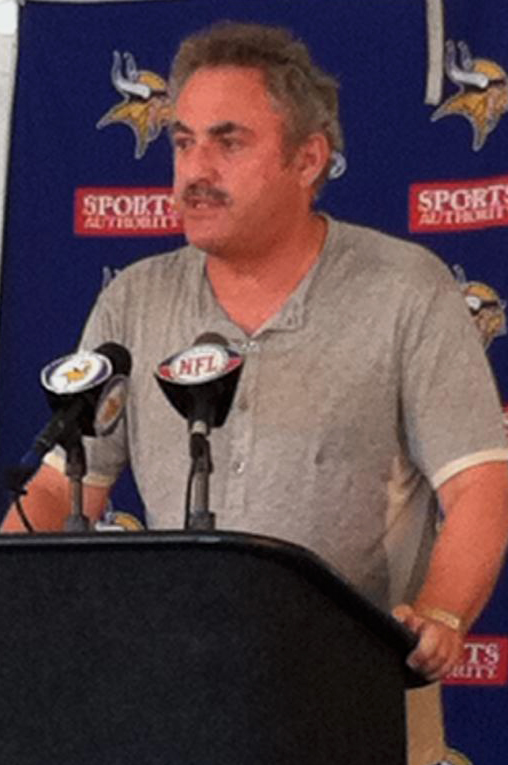
Wilf in 2011

Wilf and five partners purchased the Minnesota Vikings of the National Football League from Red McCombs in 2005 for a reported US$600 million. Forbes estimated the 2020 value of the franchise at US$2.95 billion, 17th of the 32 NFL teams or the 33rd of the 50 most valuable sports teams.

For several years, the Vikings and Wilf stated that their former home, the Hubert H. Humphrey Metrodome, was inadequate and lobbied for a new stadium. In May 2012, the Minnesota Vikings moved closer to getting a new $975 million stadium after the state senate approved a plan that relies heavily on public financing. Later that month the deal was signed by Governor Mark Dayton and narrowly approved by the Minneapolis City Council, ending any speculation of relocation. The new stadium, U.S. Bank Stadium, opened in July 2016 on the site of the former Metrodome.

=== Nashville SC ===
In August 2017, Wilf, his brother Mark, and his cousin Leonard became minority owners of the Nashville SC alongside lead investor John Ingram.

=== Orlando City SC ===
On May 12, 2021, it was announced that Zygi, Mark, and Leonard were purchasing Major League Soccer club Orlando City SC, along with Orlando Pride of the National Women's Soccer League, and Exploria Stadium, from their ownership group led by Brazilian entrepreneur Flávio Augusto da Silva. The value of the deal has been estimated at $400–450 million. The sale will require the Wilfs to sell their minority stake in Nashville SC.

== Legal issues ==
In August 2013, Wilf, along with his brother, Mark Wilf, and cousin, Leonard Wilf, were found liable by a New Jersey court for breaking civil state racketeering laws and keeping separate accounting books to fleece former business partners of shared revenue. The presiding judge noted that Wilf had used organized crime-like tactics to commit fraud against his business partners. In September, the judge awarded the two business partner plaintiffs Ada Reichmann and Josef Halpern $84.5 million in compensatory damages, punitive damages and interest that the Wilfs must pay. In June 2018, an appeal reduced this amount to roughly $32 million.

== Personal life ==
In 2011, Zygi and Audrey Wilf purchased an apartment occupying the entire 18th floor of New York's 778 Park Avenue for $19 million, reduced from its original December 2009 asking price of $24.5 million, while they still resided in their home in Springfield, New Jersey.
