= Joseph Wilf =

Polish-American businessman (1925–2016)

- Born: 1925; Jarosław, Poland
- Died: August 3, 2016 (aged 90–91); Hillside, New Jersey, US
- Citizenship: Polish, American
- Occupation: Businessman
- Known for: Co-founder, Garden Homes
- Political party: Democratic
- Spouse: Suzie Fisch
- Children: Zygi Wilf; Mark Wilf
- Relatives: Leonard Wilf (nephew)

Joseph Wilf (1925 – August 3, 2016) was a Polish-American businessman, Holocaust survivor, and the co-founder of Garden Homes, one of the largest real estate development companies in the United States.

== Early life ==
Joseph Wilf was born in Jarosław, Poland in 1925.

In 1950, Wilf, his brother, and their wives, emigrated to the US, and settled in New Jersey.

== Career ==
In 1954, together with his older brother, Harry Wilf, he co-founded Garden Homes, one of the largest real estate development companies in the United States.

In 1964, they founded the Wilf Family Foundation, which later expanded into seven foundations.

Joe Wilf volunteered with and donated to numerous organizations, including Yeshiva University, American Society for Yad Vashem, United Jewish Appeal, Israel Bonds, Jewish Agency for Israel, Joint Distribution Committee, Conference on Material Claims Against Germany, United States Holocaust Memorial Museum and many other organizations.

He was also the first North American chair of the March of the Living, which dedicated the 2017 March of the Living to his memory.

== Personal life ==
In 1949, Wilf married Suzie Fisch in Germany, the daughter of Miriam and Markus Fisch from a pre-war Polish city of Lwów, now Lviv.

Wilf died on August 3, 2016, at his home in Hillside, New Jersey.
