= Brendan Flood =

English businessman and entrepreneur

Brendan Flood is an English businessman and entrepreneur.

From 2007 until January 2013 and from March 2014 until December 2020, Flood was a major investor and operational director of Burnley Football Club. In 2009, he published "Big Club, Small Town and Me", an autobiographical account of his experiences as a director of Burnley and their rise to the Premier League. Flood founded UCFB at Burnley's Turf Moor in 2011, the world's first higher education institution with university degrees in the football and sports industry.

He was also the co-founder of American MLS team Orlando City SC.

Flood was Managing Director of Modus Properties, based in Manchester. Modus specialised in property investment and shopping mall development. They were recognized as leaders in the field of urban regeneration. The development management team reformed as RED Partnerships Ltd in 2010, with Flood acting as chairman. Flood led the development of Jacksons Row Manchester which included the Reform Synagogue, with partners Gary Neville and Ryan Giggs. Prior to Modus, Flood had career in banking with Barclays PLC.
