= Marcos Machado =

Brazilian footballer

Personal information
- Full name: Marcos Antônio de Sousa Pimenta Machado
- Date of birth: 8 July 1957 (age 69)
- Place of birth: Recife, Pernambuco, Brazil
- Height: 1.80 m (5 ft 11 in)
- Position: Goalkeeper

Team information
- Current team: Orlando Pride (coach)

Senior career*
Years	Team	Apps	(Gls)
1971–1975	Sport Recife		
1976	América-PE		
1977–1982	Santa Amaro		
1983–1985	Náutico		
1985	Esportivo		
1986–1987	América-RJ		
1987	Central		
1987–1988	Rio Ave	20	(0)
1988–1991	União da Madeira	52	(0)
1991–1994	Nacional	68	(0)
1997	Orlando Sundogs	26	(0)
1999	Central Florida Kraze	6	(0)
- * Club domestic league appearances and goals

Marcos Antônio de Sousa Pimenta Machado (born 8 July 1957) is a Brazilian former professional footballer who played as a goalkeeper.

== Club career ==
Marcos Machado started his professional playing career at Sport Recife in Brazil starting in 1971. He became the youngest player to play in the National Championship in the first division during the 1973 season. Machado joined America Recife Club of Brazil in 1975 and played one season for them before joining Associação Atlética Santo Amaro in 1977. He played with Santo Amaro from 1977 to 1982, becoming one of the staple goalkeepers in Brazil. Other clubs Machado played from include Esportivo Bento Gonçalves in 1985, Central Sports Clube in 1987, and the União Futebol Clube from 1988 to 1990. During the 1988–89 season with União, the club won the Portugal Second Division Championship with Machado as the keeper. Machado continued to play with different squads until 2000, where he ended his career with the Central Florida Kraze of the USSL.

== Coaching career ==
Machado has been the keeper coach for the Olympic Development Program (ODP) in Florida since 1998, Pine Castle Christian Academy Head Coach from 1998 to 2000, along with coaching various clubs in Central Florida area from 1997 on. In those 15 years of coaching, he spent six years as Technical Director with two different squads. From 2005 to 2007, he was the Technical Director for the IUS Elite Boys Program. In 2008, Machado became the Technical Director of the Florida Rush Soccer Boys program.
