= Orin Wilf =

American real estate developer

- Born: Orin S. Wilf; 1973 or 1974 (age 51–52)
- Education: Hun School of Princeton
- Occupations: founder and president of Skyline Developers
- Spouse: Lisa Wilf
- Children: 2 sons
- Parent(s): Leonard Wilf; Marcia Robbins-Wilf
- Relatives: Harry Wilf (grandfather)

Orin S. Wilf (born 1974) is an American real estate developer, the founder and president of Skyline Developers, a division of Garden Homes, a company founded by his grandfather, Harry Wilf.

== Early life ==
He is the only son of Leonard Wilf and his first wife, Marcia Robbins-Wilf, and the grandson of Harry Wilf, the co-founder of Garden Homes.

Wilf was educated at the Hun School in Princeton, New Jersey, and graduated in 1992.

== Career ==
In 1998, he founded Skyline Developers.

Together with his father, he owns 5-10% of the New York Yankees.

Wilf is a member of the board of trustees of the Hun School of Princeton.

== Personal life ==
In 2001, Wilf married Lisa, and they have two sons together. In 2013, it was reported that they were "estranged" and in divorce proceedings after 12 years of marriage, following allegations that Wilf had "gambled away up to $20 million of their fortune in the Bahamas and Atlantic City over the 12 years they were married."

Wilf lives in New York City.
