= Azrak-Hamway =

American toy company

Azrak-Hamway International, Inc. (AHI) was a New York toy company founded in 1964 that initially offered inexpensive novelty-type toy items.

== History ==
In 1974, Azrak-Hamway acquired the Remco toy name and produced toys of more substance under the Remco brand, including several popular culture licensed items such as Universal Monsters, Space: 1999, Batman, Marvel Super Heroes, and other TV tie-in products. In 1994, Azrak-Hamway began marketing a line of child learning toys under the Child Guidance name; Child Guidance was an older toy brand, dating to the 1950s, that had previously belonged to several other companies before its use had lapsed in the mid-1980s. In 1997, Jakks Pacific acquired the Child Guidance and Remco brands from Azrak-Hamway.

== Products ==
Many of the inexpensive items offered by Azrak-Hamway were licensed products that featured climbing, hanging, or parachuting figures sold on simple bubble cards. These toys include:

- 1973–1981 Official World's Famous Super Monsters
- 1973 Spider-Man Spider-Car (basis of the Spider-Mobile)
- 1974 Batman Batcycle
- 1974 Planet of the Apes Water Gun, Parachutist, Helicopter, Stunt Cycle, On Horse, Prison Wagon
- 1974 Action Apeman
- 1974 Spider-Man Cycle
- 1974 Popeye Boatmobile
- 1974 M*A*S*H Emergency Helicopter
- 1974 Mickey Mouse Die Cast Fast Wheels
- 1974 Superman Zing Wing
- 1974 The Flintstones Flintmobile
- 1974 The Flintstones Flintmobile Road Racing Set
- 1975 The Flintstones Flintmobile (with Flintboat on trailer)
- 1975 The Flintstones Flintmobile Pull-Strap
- 1975 Batman Batmobile & Batboat with trailer
- 1975 Batman Stunt Cycle
- 1975 Batman Pat Blane with Launcher
- 1975 Star Trek Sky Diving Parachutist, Phaser Ray-Gun, U.S.S. Enterprise Water Gun, Phaser Saucer Gun, Flying Enterprise, Pin Ball Game
- 1976 Batman Batmobile
- 1976 Batman Walkie-Talkie Playset
- 1976 Sky Diving Parachutist (Batman, Penguin, Joker, Shazam!, Spider-Man, Robin)
- 1976 Jet Discs for Star Trek and Space: 1999
- 1977 Batman Batmobile Remote Control Car
- 1977 Welcome Back, Kotter Desk Set accessories
- 1977 Space: 1999 toys
- 1977 The Shadow Mobile and Crime Fighter Super Jet
- 1978 Parachuting toys (Spider-Man, Hulk, Planet of the Apes)
- 1979 Captain America, Fantastic Four Parachutists
- 1979 The Incredible Hulk Power Spouter Water Gun, Parachutist, Van, Stunt Cycle
- 1979 Neck Pets
- 1979 Star Fleet Wind-Up Robot and Walkie-Talkie
- 1982 Sgt. Rock Stunt Cycle and Parachutist Commando
- 1983 The Mighty Crusaders Helicopter

For toy collectors, the most significant AHI toy contribution was the Official World's Famous Super Monsters toyline, licensed from Universal Studios. These toys, released in 1973 (with additional monsters added through 1976), were an effort to capitalize on the Mego Corporation's popular Mad Monster line. The set of 8-inch action figures included Frankenstein, Dracula, the Wolf Man, the Mummy, and the Creature from the Black Lagoon. All except Dracula were officially licensed from Universal Studios.

The Mego Corporation forced Azrak-Hamway to withdraw its "Action Apemen" line by injunction, on the grounds that it infringed on Mego's licence to produce Planet of the Apes figures (Mego had outbid AHI for the figure license, although AHI continued to produce ancillary Planet of the Apes products).
