= Wilfredo =

Wilfredo is a given name which may refer to:

- Wilfredo Alicdan (born 1965), Filipino figurative artist
- Wilfredo Alvarado (born 1970), Venezuelan football defender
- Wilfredo Bustillo Castellanos (born 1958), Honduran politician
- Willy Caballero (born 1981), Argentine football goalkeeper
- Wilfredo Caraballo (born 1947), American politician
- Wil Cordero (born 1971), Puerto Rican former Major League Baseball player
- Wilfredo Gómez (born 1956), three-time world boxing champion from Puerto Rico
- Wilfredo Iraheta (born 1967), El Salvadoran retired football defender
- Wil Ledezma (born 1981), Major League Baseball pitcher from Venezuela
- Wilfredo Martínez (born 1985), Cuban long jumper
- Wilfredo Negrón (born 1973), Puerto Rican boxer
- Wilfredo Pedraza, Peruvian politician
- Wilfredo Santa-Gómez (born 1948), Puerto Rican author
- Wilfredo Vázquez (born 1960), three-time world boxing champion from Puerto Rico
- Wilfredo Vázquez, Jr. (born 1984), winner of two superbantamweight world boxing titles
- Wilfredo León (born 1993), Cuban-Polish volleyball player
- Wilfredo (character), performed by the comedian Matt Roper

== See also ==
- Wifredo
- Wilfred (disambiguation)
- Wilfried
- Wilf
