= Mark Wilf =

American businessman (born 1962)

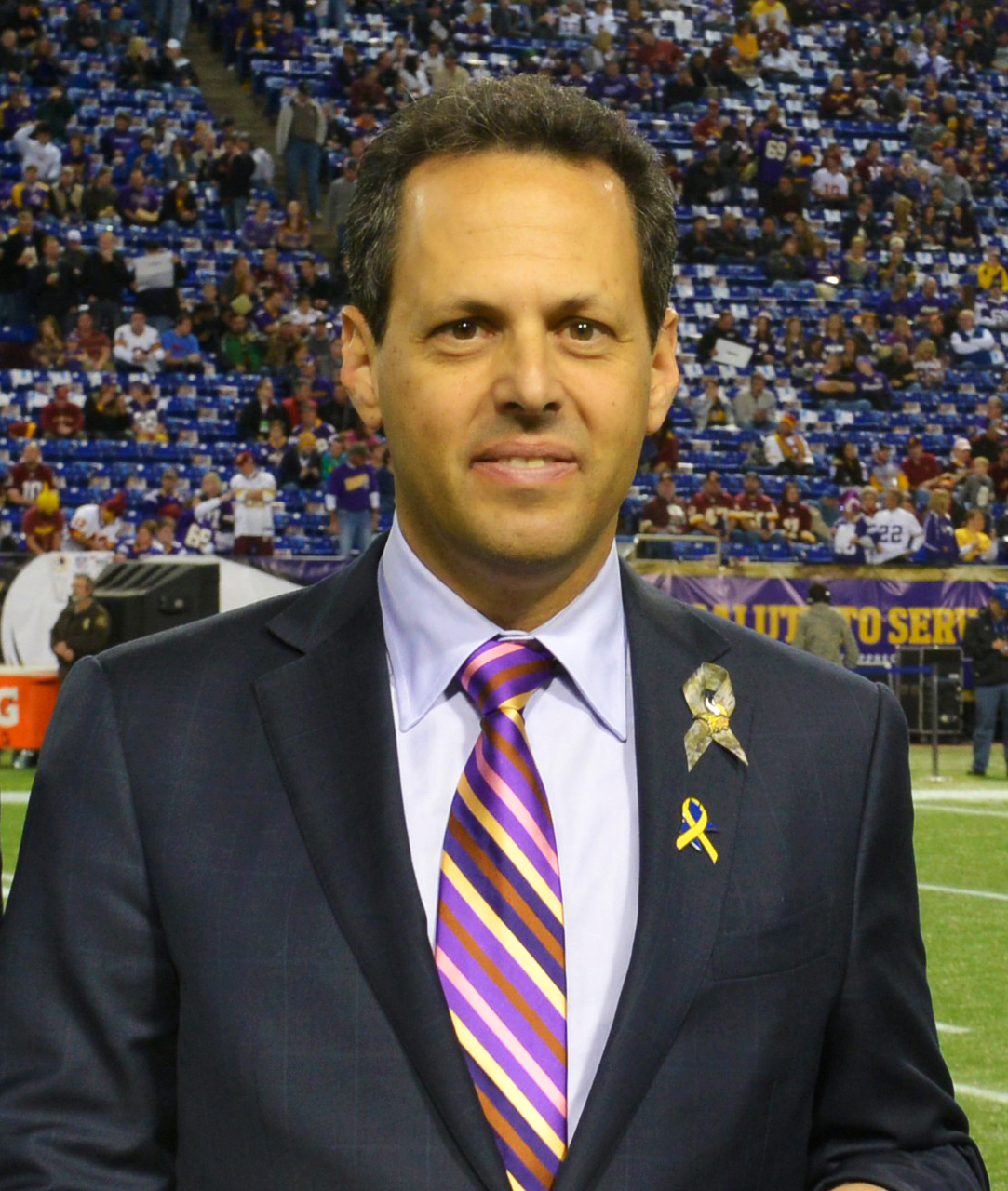
- Wilf in 2013
- Born: 1962 (age 63–64)
- Education: Princeton University (BA); New York University School of Law (JD)
- Occupation: Real estate developer
- Known for: Co-owner of Minnesota Vikings & Orlando City SC
- Spouse: Jane E. Frieder
- Children: 4
- Parent(s): Joseph Wilf and Elizabeth Wilf
- Family: Zygi Wilf (brother); Leonard Wilf (cousin)

Mark Wilf (born 1962) is an American businessman who is the president and co-owner of the Minnesota Vikings, and chairman and co-owner of Orlando City SC and Orlando Pride.

== Biography ==
Born to a Jewish family, the son of Joseph and Elizabeth Wilf, who were both Holocaust survivors from Nazi occupied Poland. Mark's father, Joseph Wilf (1925–2016), was the first North American Chair of the March of the Living, which dedicated the 2017 March of the Living to his memory. Mark has one brother, Zygi Wilf. The Wilf family immigrated to the United States from Europe in the early 1950s and settled in Hillside, New Jersey. After a brief stint as used car salesmen, Joseph and his brother Harry Wilf began purchasing apartment buildings and renting units. Eventually, the brothers began building single-family homes and founded Garden Homes. A successful real estate developer, his two main family-run businesses, Garden Homes and Garden Commercial Properties, have constructed some 25,000 homes in 39 states across the country since their initial ventures; the two entities and their affiliates own and manage 25,000,000 square feet (2,300,000 m^{2}) in retail and business property.

Wilf received a B.A. from Princeton University and then a J.D from the New York University School of Law. After graduation, Wilf joined the family real estate business, Garden Homes. In 2005, Wilf and his brother Zygi Wilf, took control of the Minnesota Vikings with advisement on the deal coming from international law firm Greenberg Traurig and former Vikings COO Kevin Warren. Wilf was appointed president and his brother Zygi, CEO. As president, Wilf manages the day-to-day operations of the team and directs all its business departments.

== Philanthropy ==
Wilf is a major donor to the Jewish community including Yad Vashem and the Holocaust memorial museum in Israel. Wilf served as national campaign chairman for the Jewish Federations of North America (JFNA) and was elected chair of their board of trustees in 2018. He was also appointed by the JFNA to lead a new initiative that addresses the needs of impoverished Holocaust survivors living in the United States. He serves as a Trustee of Yeshiva University. He also serves on the Board of Trust of Vanderbilt University.

In July 2022, he was elected Chairman of the Board of Governors of the Jewish Agency, and served in this role until October 2026.

== Personal life ==
In 1990, Wilf married Jane E. Frieder in a Jewish ceremony in Philadelphia; they have four children.

In May 2016, they bought a $7 million house in Palm Beach, Florida from Peter W. May, using a Florida LLC company.
