= Wilfried Tekovi =

French-born Togolese footballer (born 1989)

Personal information
- Date of birth: 10 October 1989 (age 37)
- Place of birth: Bordeaux, France
- Position: Defender

Team information
- Current team: FC Gueugnon

Youth career
- 2001–2004: SCO Angers
- 2004–2006: Peterborough United
- 2006–2007: Girondins Bordeaux
- 2007–2009: FC Gueugnon

Senior career*
Years	Team	Apps	(Gls)
2009–	FC Gueugnon	0	(0)

International career^{‡}
2008–	Togo	2	(0)
- * Club domestic league appearances and goals as of 17:02, 29 October 2009 (UTC) ‡ National team caps and goals as of 17:02, 29 October 2009 (UTC)

Wilfried Tekovi (born 10 October 1989) is a Togolese international footballer who plays professionally as a defender for French side FC Gueugnon.

== Career ==
=== Club career ===
Born in Bordeaux, France, Tekovi began his career by SCO Angers before moving in 2004 to join English side Peterborough United. He later joined the reserve team of Girondins Bordeaux, playing for one year before signing in 2007 with FC Gueugnon.

=== International career ===
Tekovi made his international debut in November 2008.
