= Flávio Augusto da Silva =

Brazilian businessman (born 1972)

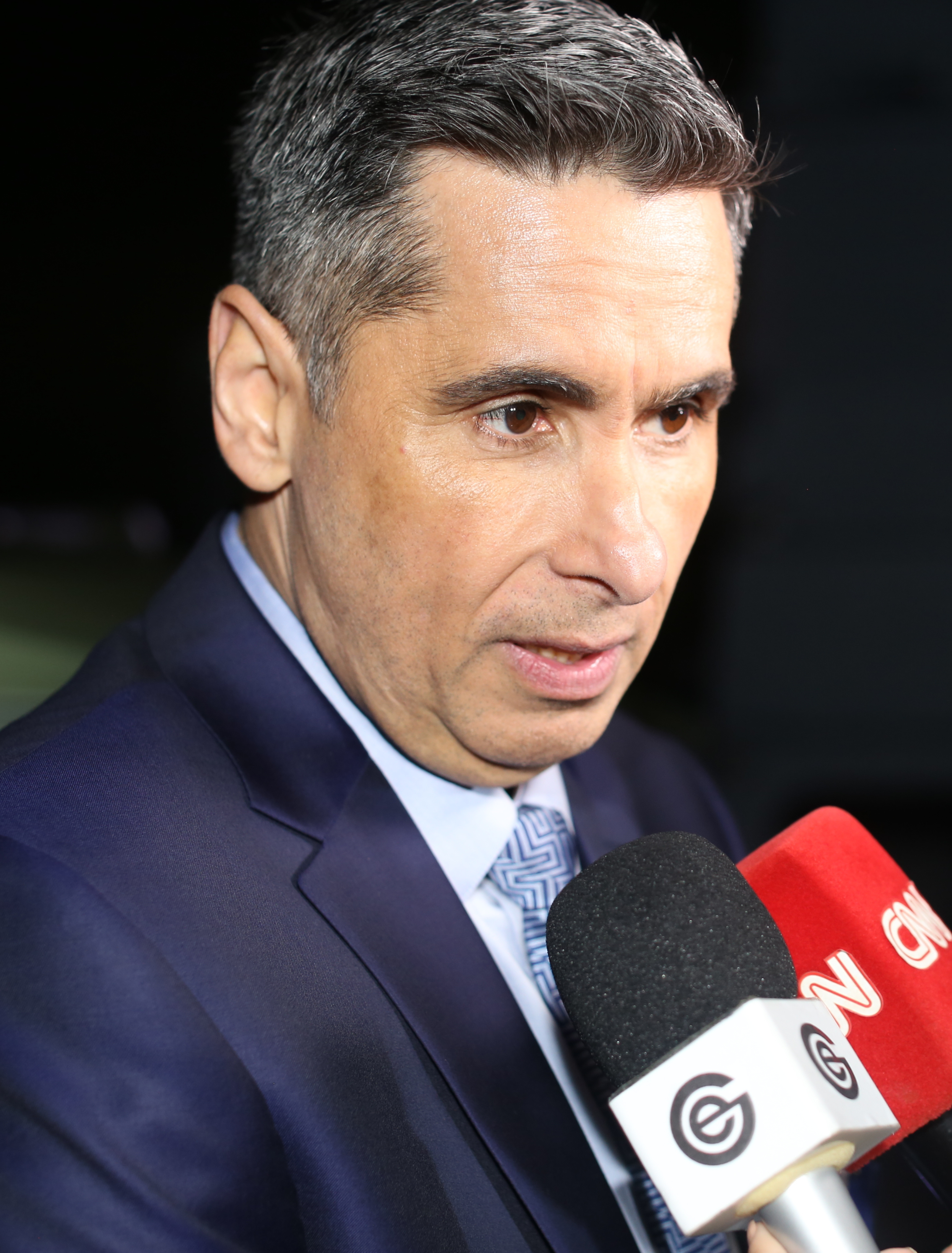

Flávio Augusto da Silva (born 7 February 1972) is a Brazilian businessman. He founded the Wise Up chain of English-language schools, which he sold in 2013 for R$877 million and bought back in 2015 for R$398 million. In 2013, he bought Orlando City SC for US$80 million, obtaining a Major League Soccer franchise that year and overseeing the construction of a new stadium, before selling the club in 2021 for an estimated US$400 million.

Silva's wealth was estimated by Forbes in 2022 to be R$1.3 billion. In 2024, he was appointed as communications ambassador for the Brazilian Navy, a voluntary and non-paid role.

== Biography ==
=== Early life and Wise Up ===
Silva was born and raised in the outskirts of Rio de Janeiro in a lower-middle class family in which his father was in the military and his mother was a teacher. Aged 17, he entered the Colégio Naval but was asked to leave two years later due to not exhibiting discipline.

Aged 19, Silva began working for an English-language school, by using tokens to sell courses from a public telephone box. He rose to regional sales director. When he was 23, he used a loan to set up his own language school, which earned him 1 million Brazilian reais in his first year and became the company Wise Up. He and his wife each took a loan of R$10,000 to set up the English-language school for adults, considering that jobs in the future would demand the language. He had no university degree, having not completed a computer science course at the Fluminense Federal University, and did not speak English.

In 2013, Silva sold Wise Up and its 393 schools to Grupo Abril Educação for R$877 million, before buying it back in 2015 for R$398 million due to its financial problems. In 2017, Carlos Wizard bought 35% of the company for R$200 million. Two years later, private equity firm Kinea invested the same amount.

In 2011 Silva set up the Facebook page "Geração de Valor" (Generation of Value) to share business advice, which had 3.3 million followers in 2018.

=== Orlando City SC ===
In early 2013, after having sold Wise Up, Silva bought Orlando City SC for US$80 million, pledging to build a 25,000-seater stadium and obtain a Major League Soccer franchise. In November that year, the club obtained the MLS franchise. In July 2014, he signed former Brazil international Kaká, a friend and business contact.

In 2016, having failed in getting city or state support for the new stadium, Silva used the EB-5 visa programme, in which investors would pay US$500,000 for a stake in the stadium in exchange for a green card. He had obtained his green card in 2009 through an investment in Vermont.

Silva sold Orlando City SC in 2021 to the Wilf family, owners of the National Football League's Minnesota Vikings. The deal, which included women's team Orlando Pride, had an estimated value of US$400 million.

=== Return to Brazil ===
Forbes in Brazil ranked Silva as the country's 232nd richest person in 2022, with a net worth of R$1.3 billion. In February 2023, his former home in Orlando, Florida which had been built in 2019 was sold for R$190 million.

In September 2024, Silva was appointed as a communications ambassador for the Brazilian Navy, a voluntary and non-paid role promoting the Navy on social media. He was sworn in by Admiral Marcos Sampaio Olsen aboard the NAM Atlântico (A-140).
