= List of Orlando City SC seasons =

Orlando City SC is a soccer team based in Orlando, Florida. The Lions competed in the USL Pro, in their early years of existence, and competes in Major League Soccer (MLS).

== Key ==
Key to competitions

- Major League Soccer (MLS) – The top-flight of soccer in the United States, established in 1996.
- USL Pro – The third division of soccer in the United States from its 2010 establishment through 2017. The league has been successively known as USL and USL Championship and is now the second division of American soccer since its status elevation in 2017.
- U.S. Open Cup (USOC) – The premier knockout cup competition in U.S. soccer, first contested in 1914.
- CONCACAF Champions League (CCL) – The premier competition in North American soccer since 1962. It went by the name of Champions' Cup until 2008.

Key to colors and symbols

1st or W	Winners
2nd or RU	Runners-up
3rd	Third place
Last	Last place
♦	League golden boot winner
	Highest average attendance
Italics	Ongoing competition

Key to league record

- Season = The year and article of the season
- Div = Division/level on pyramid
- League = League name
- Pld = Games played
- W = Games won
- D = Games drawn
- L = Games lost
- GF = Goals for
- GA = Goals against
- GD = Goal difference
- Pts = Points
- PPG = Points per game
- Conf. = Conference position
- Overall = League position

Key to cup record

- DNE = Did not enter
- DNQ = Did not qualify
- NH = Competition not held or canceled
- GS = Group stage
- R1 = First round
- R2 = Second round
- R3 = Third round
- R4 = Fourth round
- R5 = Fifth round
- Ro32 = Round of 32
- Ro16 = Round of 16
- QF = Quarterfinals
- SF = Semifinals
- F = Final
- RU = Runners-up
- W = Winners

== Seasons ==
Season	League											Position		Playoffs	USOC	Continental	Other		Average attendance (Note: Average attendance only includes statistics from regular season matches.)	Top goalscorer(s) (Note: Top goalscorer(s) includes all goals scored in the regular season, MLS Cup Playoffs, U.S. Open Cup, MLS is Back Tournament, CONCACAF Champions League, FIFA Club World Cup, and other competitive continental matches.)		Head coach(es)
Season	Div	League	Pld	W	D	L	GF	GA	GD	Pts	PPG	Conf.	Overall	Playoffs	USOC	Continental	Other		Average attendance	Name(s)	Goals	Head coach(es)
2011	3	USL Pro	24	15	6	3	36	16	+20	51	2.13	1st	1st	W	Ro16	DNE	NH		5,265	(United States) Maxwell Griffin	12	(England) Heath
2012	3	USL Pro	24	17	6	1	50	18	+32	57	2.38	N/A	1st	SF	R3	DNE	NH		6,606	(Jamaica) Dennis Chin	12♦	(England) Heath
2013	3	USL Pro	26	16	6	4	54	26	+28	54	2.08	N/A	2nd	W	QF	DNE	NH		8,197	(United States) Dom Dwyer	22♦	(England) Heath
2014	3	USL Pro	28	19	5	4	56	24	+32	62	2.21	N/A	1st	QF	R4	DNE	NH		4,743	(Trinidad and Tobago) Kevin Molino	22♦	(England) Heath
2015	1	MLS	34	12	8	14	46	56	–10	44	1.29	7th	14th	DNQ	QF	DNE	NH		32,847	(Canada) Cyle Larin	18	(England) Heath
2016	1	MLS	34	9	14	11	55	60	–5	41	1.21	8th	15th	DNQ	Ro16	DNQ	NH		31,323	(Canada) Cyle Larin	14	(England) Heath (United States) Murphy^{i} (United States) Kreis
2017	1	MLS	34	10	9	15	39	58	–19	39	1.15	10th	18th	DNQ	R4	DNQ	NH		25,028	(Canada) Cyle Larin	12	(United States) Kreis
2018	1	MLS	34	8	4	22	43	74	–31	28	0.82	11th	22nd	DNQ	QF	DNQ	NH		23,979	(United States) Dom Dwyer	13	(United States) Kreis (United States) Murphy^{i} (Republic of Ireland) O'Connor
2019	1	MLS	34	9	10	15	44	52	–8	37	1.09	11th	22nd	DNQ	SF	DNQ	DNQ		22,761	(Portugal) Nani	12	(Republic of Ireland) O'Connor
2020	1	MLS	23	11	8	4	40	25	+15	41	1.78	4th	5th	QF	NH	DNQ	MLS is Back Tournament	RU	6,346	(United States) Chris Mueller	10	(Colombia) Pareja
2021	1	MLS	34	13	12	9	50	48	+2	51	1.50	6th	10th	R1	NH	DNQ	Leagues Cup	QF	15,644	(United States) Daryl Dike	11	(Colombia) Pareja
2022	1	MLS	34	14	6	14	44	53	–9	48	1.41	7th	13th	R1	W	DNQ	DNQ		17,283	(Uruguay) Facundo Torres	13	(Colombia) Pareja
2023	1	MLS	34	18	9	7	55	39	+16	63	1.82	2nd	2nd	QF	R4	Ro16	Leagues Cup	Ro32	20,590	(United States) Duncan McGuire	15	(Colombia) Pareja
2024	1	MLS	34	15	7	12	59	50	+9	52	1.53	4th	9th	SF	DNE	Ro16	Leagues Cup	Ro32	22,804	(Uruguay) Facundo Torres	20	(Colombia) Pareja
2025	1	MLS	34	14	11	9	63	51	+12	53	1.56	9th	14th	WC	Ro16	DNQ	Leagues Cup	4th	20,573	(Argentina) Martín Ojeda	20	(Colombia) Pareja
Total	–	–	465	200	121	144	734	650	+84	721	1.60	–	–	–	–	–	–		–	(Uruguay) Facundo Torres	47	–

== International competitions ==
=== Matches ===
Season	Competition	Round	Opposition	Home (Note: Orlando City score listed first)	Away	Aggregate
2023	CONCACAF Champions League	Round of 16	(Mexico) Tigres UANL	1–1	0–0	1–1 (Note: Eliminated on away goals)

=== By competition ===
As of April 20, 2023

Competition	Pld	W	D	L	GF	GA	GD	Win% (Note: Win% is rounded to two decimal places.)
CONCACAF Champions League	2	0	2	0	1	1	+0	0.00
Total	2	0	2	0	1	1	+0	0.00

=== By country ===
Country	Pld	W	D	L	GF	GA	GD	Win%
Mexico	2	0	2	0	1	1	+0	0.00

=== By club ===
Club	Pld	W	D	L	GF	GA	GD	Win%
(Mexico) Tigres UANL	2	0	2	0	1	1	+0	0.00
