= Wifredo =

Wifredo is a masculine given name. Notable people with the name include:

- Wifredo A. Ferrer (born 1966), American attorney
- Wifredo Lam (1902–1982), Cuban artist
- Wifredo Ricart (1897–1974), Spanish engineer, designer and executive manager

== See also ==
- Wilfredo
