= Wilford Gyroplane =

1930s American autogyro

Gyroplane
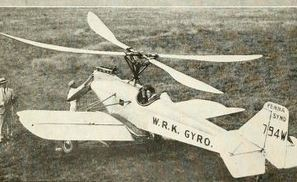
- Cirrus-engined Gyroplane, 1931

General information
- Type: experimental autogyo
- National origin: US
- Manufacturer: (post 1933) Pennsylvania Aircraft
- Designer: Walter Rieseler and Walter Kreisler

History
- First flight: 1931

The Wilford Gyroplane was based on a German autogyro first flown in 1926. After E. Burke Wilford bought the rights and patents, it was developed in the US until 1936.

== Design and development ==
=== 1926-1930 ===
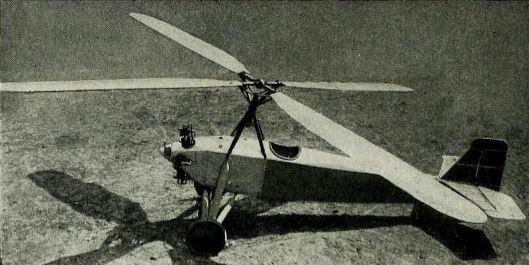
Rieseler and Kreisler's 1926 autogyro in Germany

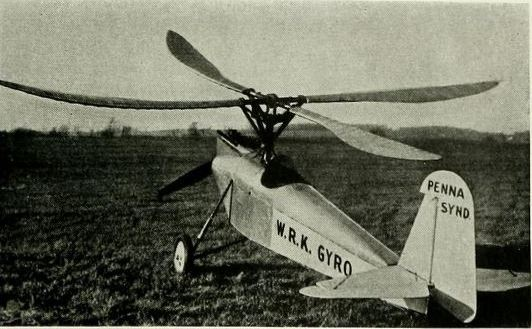
Wilford's 1930 wingless prototype

The idea for an auto-rotating and auto-feathering rotor for what became known as autogyros was developed and patented in the mid-1920s in Germany by Walter Rieseler and Walter Kreisler. They built a wingless example in 1926. In the autumn of 1928 E. Burke Wilford bought the patent rights and in March 1930 a similar wingless autogyro with a conventional tail was built in the US at the Uppercu works in Keyport, New Jersey with Rieseler and Kreisler supervising. Powered by an 85 hp (63 kW) Cirrus upright engine, this ambitious design failed because of its choice of a Göttingen 429 airfoil section for the four rotor blades. The next iteration added stub wings and new rotor blades of USA 35B section to the earlier fuselage and engine. It also had a revised undercarriage. Built at Paoli by the Pennsylvania Syndicate, this became known as the Wilford Gyroplane.

Its rotor had a diameter of 25 ft (7.6 m), though the broad blades began about 1 ft 3 in (0.38 m) from their common vertical mast. Each blade had an area of about 15 sq ft (1.4 m^{2}) and an aspect ratio of 8.4. Opposing pairs of blades were rigidly fixed together but free to rotate on their common axis. This allowed the blades to alter incidence as they rotated: with the blade axis ahead of its centre of pressure the advancing blade, moving at a higher airspeed, lowered its angle of attack, thus increasing the angle of incidence of the receding blade to compensate for its lower airspeed. So long as the blade incidences varied by only small angles the blade lifts remained in balance. Various mechanical ways of damping the excursions, like springs or counterweights, were tested. As on most auto-rotating-wing aircraft, the blades were attached to a rotor hub free to rotate on a vertical mast. This hub comprised four short V-struts, each with a collar bearing a blade shaft. The shafts met on a central bearing which allowed the opposing pairs to rotate independently over a small angular range.

In 1930 the emphasis was on the development of a stable autogyro and lateral and pitch control was provided by traditional aircraft control surfaces adapted to low speeds. The stub wings, mounted on the lower fuselage longerons and braced with V-struts to the upper longerons, carried full span, broad chord balanced ailerons as a safeguard while lateral control by differential rotor pitch was developed. Its straight-edged tail surfaces were no different from those of other, contemporary, small aircraft, with a rectangular tailplane mounted on top of the fuselage carrying a balanced elevator with a large cut-out for rudder movement. The fin was triangular, the balanced rudder rectangular.

The Gyroplane's Cirrus engine was mounted in the nose with upper cylinders exposed for cooling. It was flown from a single seat open cockpit just behind the rotor mast; behind it the flat-sided fuselage had a rounded upper decking.

Its fixed undercarriage was of the split axle type, centrally mounted on struts from the stub wings, but with an unusually wide track. The wheels and outer axles were mounted on near-vertical V-struts from the stub wings. There was a large, sprung, tailwheel on the extreme rear fuselage.

=== 1931-34 ===
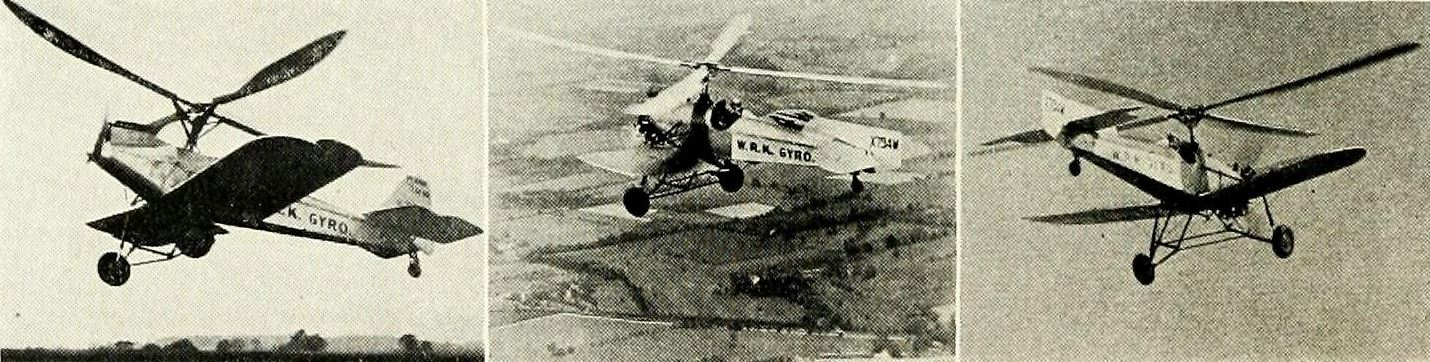
Development: 1931 with Cirrus engine and in 1932 and 1933 with Kinner

The 1931 machine was first flown in 1931 by Frank Brown and during 1932 about ten hours flight testing was piloted by Paul Hovgaard. These flights led to major changes including a more powerful, 155 hp (116 kW) Kinner R-5 radial engine. Lateral control was still shared between rotor and ailerons, though these were reduced in area. Pitch control was now also shared between rotor and elevator. Directional stability and yaw control continued to be provided by a much broader fin and rudder. By 1934 it was flying with a revised undercarriage with wheels independently mounted on V-struts from the ends of a rectangular frame held under the fuselage.

Early in 1933 Wilford replaced the Pennsylvania Syndicate with Pennsylvania Aircraft.

=== 1935-6 ===
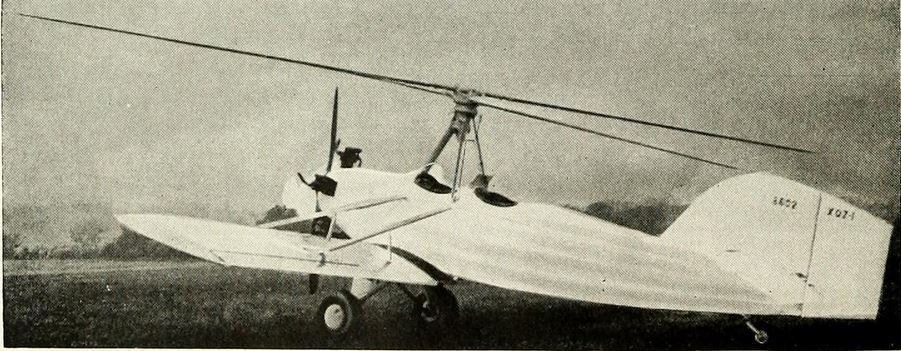
The XOZ-1 naval autogyro, as a landplane

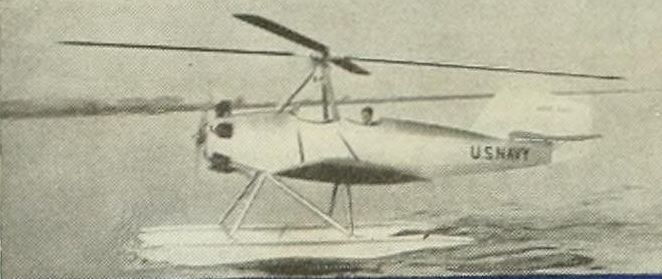
The XOZ-1 naval autogyro, as a floatplane

In 1935 Pennsylvania Aircraft produced a two-seat trainer version of the Gyroplane, generally known by its US Navy name Pennsylvania XOZ-1. This used the fuselage of a Kinner K-5-powered Fleet 2 trainer, though the Fleet vertical tail was replaced by the much broader one of the 1934 Gyroplane. The relatively small, triangular plan tailplane was mounted on top of the fuselage, carrying approximately rectangular elevators. The XOZ-1 had fabric-covered stub wings, with wooden spars and dural ribs from the lower fuselage braced by pairs of parallel struts to the upper longerons with ailerons similar in area to those of conventional aircraft. The fuselage, fabric-covered over a welded steel tube frame, had two separate, open cockpits, one just ahead of the hub but within its support pylon, and the other over the wing trailing edge.

To cope with the increase in weight the disk diameter was increased by 28%. The plan of individual blades, apart from tips and roots, was rectangular and the hub was much simplified and neatly enclosed.

The two-seater retained the undercarriage of the Fleet 2, a split-axle type with outer axle ends on V-struts from the lower fuselage longerons and centrally hinged from a strut pylon just below the fuselage centreline. Its track was 67.5 in (1.71 m). It also flew as a floatplane, with Edo floats mounted on N-form struts from the lower fuselage.

After trials, the U.S.N. returned the XOZ-1 to Pennsylvania Aircraft, who ceased trading in 1936.

== Specifications (XOZ-1) ==
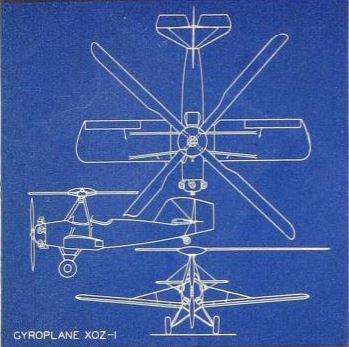
Wilford Gyroplane XOZ-1

Data from Aero Digest, April 1935.

General characteristics

- Crew: two, instructor and pupil
- Length: 21 ft 4 in (6.50 m)
- Wingspan: 27 ft 4 in (8.33 m)
- Height: 10 ft (3.0 m)
- Wing area: 110 sq ft (10 m^{2})
- Empty weight: 1,455 lb (660 kg)
- Gross weight: 1,985 lb (900 kg)
- Fuel capacity: 16 US gal (13 imp gal; 61 L)
- Powerplant: 1 × Kinner R-5 five cylinder radial, 155 hp (116 kW) at 1,975 rpm
- Main rotor diameter: one × 32 ft (9.8 m)
- Main rotor area: 804 sq ft (74.7 m^{2}) swept. Four blades, each of area 17.1 sq ft (1.59 m^{2})
- Propellers: 2-bladed metal

Performance

- Maximum speed: 107 mph (172 km/h, 93 kn)
- Cruise speed: 90 mph (140 km/h, 78 kn)
- Range: 148 mi (238 km, 129 nmi)
- Landing speed: 30 mph (48 km/h; 26 kn)
