= Leonard Wilf =

American businessman

- Born: 1947 (age 78–79); Göggingen, Allied-occupied Germany
- Education: Boston University (BA); Georgetown University (JD); New York University (LLM)
- Occupations: President of Garden Homes; Co-owner of the Minnesota Vikings, Orlando City SC, and Orlando Pride
- Spouses: Marcia Robbins-Wilf; Beth Wilf
- Children: 4, including Orin Wilf
- Parent(s): Harry and Judith Wilf
- Relatives: Zygi Wilf (cousin); Mark Wilf (cousin); Saul Robbins (father-in-law)

Leonard A. Wilf (born 1947) is an American businessman, the president of real estate development company Garden Homes, the co-owner and vice chairman of the Minnesota Vikings football team, and co-owner of Orlando City SC.

== Early life ==
Leonard Wilf was born in Göggingen, Germany, the son of Holocaust survivors Harry Wilf and Judith Wilf (died 2006). From the age of nine, he grew up in New Jersey. Wilf earned a B.A. degree from Boston University, a J.D. degree from Georgetown University, and an LL.M. degree in taxation from New York University.

Wilf grew up in Hillside, New Jersey in a home adjoining that of his cousin Zygi.

== Career ==
Wilf is president of the family-owned real estate development company, Garden Homes.

With his cousins, brothers Zygi and Mark Wilf, he co-owns the Minnesota Vikings football team. In August 2017, Wilf and his cousins became co-owners of the Nashville SC alongside lead investor John Ingram. In 2015, the Wilf family had an estimated net worth of $5 billion.

== Philanthropy ==
Wilf has sat on the Board of Trustees of NewYork–Presbyterian Hospital since 2009. Wilf is chairman of the American Society for Yad Vashem, and has been on the United States Holocaust Memorial Museum Council.

== Personal life ==
Wilf was married to the educator and philanthropist Dr. Marcia Robbins-Wilf. She is the daughter of Saul Robbins, the co-founder of the Remco toy company, and his wife Ruth. Their divorce negotiations took 12 years, with $20 million in fees for lawyers and accountants. According to Wilf, "I was divorced, married and had a baby all in one week."

Wilf and his wife Beth have four children and live in New York City. He is a member of Mountain Ridge Country Club in West Caldwell, and a keen golfer.
