= Wilfred (given name) =

Wilfred, Wilfrid, Wilfrith, Wifred
- Gender: Male

Origin
- Origin: (germanic) wil (will) and frið (peace) in Old English
- Meaning: "He who wants peace"

Other names
- Related names: Wilfried, Wilfrid, Wilf

Wilfred is a masculine given name derived from Germanic roots meaning "will" and "peace" (like Old English wil and frið). The name was popular in the United Kingdom in the early twentieth century. Wilfried and its English spelling, Wilfrid, are closely related to Wilfred, with the same roots (Will and Frieden in German).

== People named Wilfred ==
- Wilfred the Hairy (died 897), a count in what is now Spain
- Wilfred Abrahams, Barbadian politician
- Wilfred Arthur (1919–2000), Australian fighter ace
- Wilfred Baddeley (1872–1929), British tennis player
- Wilfred Benítez (born 1958), Puerto Rican boxer
- Wilfred Gordon Bigelow (1913–2005), Canadian heart surgeon
- Wilfred Bion (1897–1979), British psychoanalyst
- Wilfred Bouma (born 1978), Dutch footballer
- Wilfred Bungei (born 1980), Kenyan middle-distance runner
- Wilfred Burchett (1911–1983), Australian journalist
- Wilfred Codrington (born 1983), American legal scholar
- Wilfred de Soysa (1884–1968), Sri Lankan entrepreneur, landed proprietor, and philanthropist
- Wilfred Edwards (disambiguation)
- Wilfred Greatorex (1922–2002), English television and film writer, script editor and producer
- Wilfred Grenfell (1865–1940), British medical missionary to Newfoundland and Labrador
- Wilfred Hamilton-Shimmen, British executive director based in Singapore
- Wilfred Johnson (1935–1988), FBI informant against the Gambino organized crime family
- Wilfred Kitching (1893–1977), British, seventh General of the Salvation Army
- Wilfred Lau, Hong Kong singer and actor
- Wilfred Ndidi (born 1996), Nigerian football player
- Wilfred Iván Ojeda (1955–2011), Venezuelan journalist and politician
- Wilfred Owen (1893–1918), British poet and soldier
- Wilfred Pickles (1904–1978), English actor and radio presenter
- Wilfred Potter (1910–1994), English cricketer
- Wilfred A. Ratwatte, Sri Lankan politician
- Wilfred Rhodes (1877–1973), English cricketer
- Wilfred Rose (1922–2008), Trinidad and Tobago diplomat and politician
- Wilfred Skinner (1934-2003), Singaporean football goalkeeper and field hockey player
- Wilfred Cantwell Smith (1916–2000), Canadian professor of comparative religion
- Wilfred Stokes (1860–1927), British inventor of the Stokes mortar
- Wilfred Thesiger (1910–2003), British explorer and travel writer
- Wilfred Trotter (1872–1939), British surgeon, pioneer in neurosurgery and contributor to social psychology
- Wilfred Steven Uytengsu, Filipino businessman
- Wilfred Wood (1897–1982), British First World War recipient of the Victoria Cross
- Wilfred Wood (bishop) (born 1936), first black bishop in the Church of England

== People named Wilfrid ==
- Wilfrid (c. 634–709), Anglo-Saxon saint and Bishop of York
- Wilfrid II (bishop of York) or Saint Wilfrid the Younger (d. either 745 or 746), also an Anglo-Saxon saint and Bishop of York
- Wilfrid Scawen Blunt (1840-1922), English poet, anti-imperialist and horse-breeder
- Wilfrid Brambell (1912–1985), Irish actor
- Wilfrid Wilson Gibson (1878–1962), British poet
- Wilfrid de Glehn (1870–1951), British Impressionist painter
- Wilfrid Hall (1892–1965), British entomologist
- Wilfrid Kent Hughes (1895–1970), Australian soldier, Olympian and Olympic Games organiser, author and federal and state government minister
- Wilfrid Hyde-White (1903–1991), English character actor
- Wilfrid Laurier (1841–1919), seventh prime minister of Canada
- Wilfrid Lawson (disambiguation)
- Wilfrid Wop May (1896–1952), Canadian First World War flying ace and aviation pioneer
- Wilfrid Napier (born 1941), Roman Catholic cardinal and Archbishop of Durbin, South Africa
- Wilfrid Noyce (1917–1962), English mountaineer and author
- Wilfrid Pelletier (1896–1982), Canadian conductor, pianist, composer and administrator
- Wilfred Martin Rajapakse (1864-?), Sri Lankan lawyer and politician
- Wilfrid Schroder (1946–2013), Associate Justice of the Kentucky Supreme Court
- Wilfrid Sellars (1912–1989), American philosopher
- Wilfred Senanayake (1918-2008), Sri Lankan Trotskyist MP
- Wilfrid Michael Voynich (1865–1930), Polish revolutionary, antiquarian and bibliophile
- Wilfrid Wood (1888–1976), English artist

== Fictional characters ==
- Wilfrid, one of The Bash Street Kids
- Wilfred, one of the title characters of Pip, Squeak and Wilfred, a British newspaper strip cartoon (1919-1956)
- Wilfred, title character of Wilfred (Australian TV series) and its remake, Wilfred (U.S. TV series)
- Wilfred of Ivanhoe, the hero of Sir Walter Scott's novel Ivanhoe
- Wilfred James, the protagonist of the 2017 film 1922
- Wilfred Mott, in the TV show Doctor Who

== See also ==
- Wilfred (disambiguation)
- Wilf
- Wilfried (given name)
- Wilfrith, a given name
