= Remco =

American toy manufacturer

Remco Industries Inc.
- Company type: Private (1949–66); Subsidiary (1974–97)
- Industry: Entertainment
- Founded: 1949
- Founder: Isaac Heller; Saul Robbins
- Defunct: 1997; 29 years ago
- Fate: Taken over by Jakks Pacific in 1997 and absorbed into it
- Key people: Marvin Azrak; Ezra Hamway
- Products: Toys, Action figures
- Parent: Azrak-Hamway (1974–97)

Remco Industries Inc. was an American toy company. Founded in 1949, it is known for toys integrating technology and innovation from their inception.

== History ==
Remco was founded in 1949 in New York City by cousins Isaac Heller and Saul Robbins. The name was a portmanteau of "remote control". As Heller had been an electronics technician at the US Navy, Remco's first toys were 2-way communication devices such as walkie-talkies. Some products by Remco in the 1950s included the Tiny Tim Pocket Toy Radio, Movieland Drive-In Theatre, Coney Island Penny Machine, Dick Tracy Electronic Wrist Radios, and Yankee Doodle Secret Rocket Test Center. The slogan "every boy wants a Remco toy" was used in Remco's early TV commercials.

Remco began to expand its line in the 1960s starting with their slogan which was adaapted to the more inclusive "every boy wants a Remco toy... and so do girls!" Those changes including the production of several doll lines such as Littlechap family, Baby Walk Alone, Snugglebun, Heidi, Baby Glad ‘N Sad, Bottle Baby, Tippy Tumbles, among others. In 1964, the short-lived Hamilton's Invaders line of monstrous insects was launched.

Apart from their own lines of products, Remco acquired many licenses such as Star Trek, Batman, The Munsters, Lost in Space, Dave Clark Five, and The Beatles. Nevertheless Heller and Robbins sold the company in 1966 in search of other business interests. Remco filled for bankruptcy in 1971, being purchased by another toy company, Azrak-Hamway International (AHI), which kept the "Remco" brandname using it to commercialise the Universal Monsters line of horror figures.

In 1984, AHI nearly acquired the World Wrestling Federation (WWF) toy license, but lost out to LJN.

In 1997, Jakks Pacific acquired Remco and AHI's Child Guidance from Azrak-Hamway. Under Jakks Pacific, the brand was absorbed into its other products.

== Toys ==
=== 1950s ===
- 1950s Space Commander Walkie Talkies
- 1959 Coney Island Penny Machine (Combination crane game and coin bank)
- 1959 Yankee Doodle Secret Rocket Test Center

=== 1960s ===
- 1962 Caravelle Radio Transmitter and Receiver
- 1964 Thimble City "Magnetic Powered" Playset Style 670

- 1969 Tru-Smoke Trucks
- 1969 Frustration Ball

=== 1970s ===
- 1970 Mister Brain

=== 1980s ===
- 1983 Crystar for Marvel Comics
- 1985 AWA Remco Action Figures Wrestling Figures
- 1986 Karate Kid Action Figures

=== 1990s ===
- 1991 WWF Hulk Hogan 110 Signature Camera
- 1992 Steel Tec Motorized Construction Set
