= Harry Wilf =

American businessman (1921-1992)

- Born: 1921; Poland
- Died: 1992 (aged 70–71); US
- Occupation: Businessman
- Known for: Co-founder, Garden Homes
- Spouse: Judith Jakubowiez
- Children: Leonard Wilf
- Relatives: Joseph Wilf (brother)

Harry Wilf (1921 – 1992) was a Polish-born American businessman, and the co-founder of Garden Homes, one of the largest real estate development companies in the United States.

== Early life ==
Harry Wilf was born in Poland in 1921, the son of Ella and Oscar Wilf. At the start of World War II, the Russians deported the family from Jaroslaw, Poland, to a Siberian labor camp.

In 1950, they emigrated to the US, and settled in Hillside, New Jersey.

== Career ==
In 1954, together with his brother, Joseph Wilf, he co-founded Garden Homes, one of the largest real estate development companies in the United States.

In 1964, they founded the Wilf Family Foundation, which later expanded into seven foundations.

== Personal life ==
He was married to Judith Jakubowiez (died 2006), and they had a son, Leonard Wilf.

== Legacy ==
In 1996, the Jerusalem Foundation renovated a 12-acre (4.9 ha) park in central Jerusalem (originally called Independence Park, and planted in 1958 by the South African Zionist Federation to commemorate the tenth anniversary of Israel), and rededicated it as Harry Wilf Park.
