= List of Orlando City SC records and statistics =

Orlando City SC is an American professional soccer team based in Orlando, Florida, that competes in Major League Soccer (MLS).

This is a list of franchise records for Orlando, which dates from their inaugural MLS season in 2015 to present.

All stats accurate as of match played April 26, 2025.

== Honors ==
=== Domestic ===
U.S. Open Cup: 1

- Winners: 2022

== Player records ==
=== Appearances ===
- Youngest first-team player: Gustavo Caraballo – **16 years, 184 days** (against Toronto FC, MLS, March 1, 2025)
- Oldest first-team player: Donovan Ricketts – **37 years, 341 days** (against D.C. United, MLS, May 14, 2015)
- Oldest first-team player (outfield): Nicolás Lodeiro – **35 years, 254 days** (against New York Red Bulls, November 30, 2024)
- Youngest playoff appearance: Colin Guske – **18 years, 266 days** (against Chicago Fire, October 22, 2025)
- Oldest playoff appearance: Nicolás Lodeiro – **35 years, 254 days** (against New York Red Bulls, November 30, 2024)
- Youngest continental appearance: Michael Halliday – **20 years, 44 days** (against Tigres UANL, CONCACAF Champions League, March 7, 2023)
- Oldest continental appearance: Nicolás Lodeiro – **34 years, 357 days** (against Tigres UANL, CONCACAF Champions Cup, March 12, 2024)

Most appearances

Competitive, professional matches only.

#	Pos.	Name	Nationality	Years	MLS	Playoffs	USOC	Continent	Other	Total
1	Defender	**Robin Jansson**	Sweden	2019–present	214	12	12	5	16	263
2	Defender	Kyle Smith	United States	2019–2025	178	10	8	5	15	216
3	Goalkeeper	Pedro Gallese	Peru	2020–2025	164	12	4	5	16	201
4	Defender	Rodrigo Schlegel	Argentina	2020–2025	147	11	9	4	9	180
5	Forward	**Iván Angulo**	Colombia	2022–present	142	10	7	5	11	177
6	Midfielder	**Martín Ojeda**	Argentina	2023–present	126	8	7	6	12	157
7	Midfielder	César Araújo	Uruguay	2022–2025	120	10	9	5	12	155
8	Defender	Kevin Molino	Trinidad and Tobago	2011–2016	131	—	9	0	0	140
9	Midfielder	Mauricio Pereyra	Uruguay	2019–2023	114	7	6	2	7	136
10	Forward	Chris Mueller	United States	2018–2021	112	3	6	0	5	126

As of October 24, 2026

USOC = U.S. Open Cup; Continent = CONCACAF Champions League/Cup; Other = Other competitions include Leagues Cup and Campeones Cup

Bolded players are currently on the Orlando City SC roster.

=== Goals ===
- Youngest goalscorer: Gustavo Caraballo – **16 years, 251 days** (against Tampa Bay Rowdies, U.S. Open Cup, May 7, 2025)
- Oldest goalscorer: Kaká – **35 years, 159 days** (against New England Revolution, MLS, September 27, 2017)
- Most goals in a season in all competitions: **20**

Facundo Torres, 2024
Martín Ojeda, 2025

- Most league goals in a season: **17** – Cyle Larin, 2015
- Most goals scored in a match: **3**

Carlos Rivas vs. Charleston Battery, U.S. Open Cup, June 17, 2015
Cyle Larin vs. New York City FC, MLS, July 26, 2015
Cyle Larin vs. New York Red Bulls, MLS, September 25, 2015
Martín Ojeda vs. New England Revolution, MLS, May 10, 2025
Luis Muriel vs. Club Necaxa, Leagues Cup, August 6, 2025
Martín Ojeda vs. Inter Miami CF, MLS, May 2, 2026

- Goals in consecutive league matches: **5 consecutive matches**

Antoine Griezmann, August 22, 2026 to September 12, 2026
Iván Angulo, September 9, 2026 to October 10, 2026
Antoine Griezmann, October 10, 2026 to October 28, 2026

- Fastest goal: **0 minutes 13 seconds** – Duncan McGuire vs. Minnesota United FC, MLS, March 9, 2024
- Latest goal (not AET): **102 minutes**

Facundo Torres vs. Charlotte FC, MLS Cup playoffs, November 9, 2024
Marco Pašalić vs. Atlas, Leagues Cup, August 2, 2025

- Fastest hat-trick: **11 minutes 30 seconds** – Luis Muriel vs. Club Necaxa, Leagues Cup, August 6, 2025
- Most hat-tricks: **2**

Cyle Larin (July 26, 2015 to September 25, 2015)
Martín Ojeda (May 10, 2025 to May 2, 2026)

Overall goals

Competitive, professional matches only, appearances including substitutes appear in brackets.

#	Pos.	Name	Nationality	Years	MLS	Playoffs	USOC	Continent	Other	Total	Goals per game
1	Midfielder	**Martín Ojeda**	Argentina	2023–present	42 (126)	1 (8)	1 (7)	1 (6)	5 (12)	**50** (157)	0.32
2	Forward	Facundo Torres	Uruguay	2022–2024	37 (95)	2 (9)	4 (7)	3 (6)	1 (6)	**47** (123)	0.38
3	Forward	Cyle Larin	Canada	2015–2017	43 (87)	0 (0)	1 (2)	0 (0)	0 (0)	**44** (89)	0.49
4	Forward	Duncan McGuire	United States	2023–2026	28 (85)	0 (9)	1 (3)	1 (4)	2 (6)	**32** (109)	0.29
5	Forward	Nani	Portugal	2019–2021	28 (77)	1 (3)	0 (3)	0 (0)	2 (5)	**31** (88)	0.35
6	Midfielder	Kaká	Brazil	2015–2017	24 (75)	0 (0)	1 (3)	0 (0)	0 (0)	**25** (78)	0.32
6	Forward	Ramiro Enrique	Argentina	2023–2025	20 (74)	1 (8)	2 (3)	0 (6)	2 (11)	**25** (102)	0.25
8	Forward	Dom Dwyer	United States	2017–2020	24 (67)	0 (0)	0 (3)	0 (0)	0 (0)	**24** (70)	0.34
9	Forward	Chris Mueller	United States	2018–2021	21 (112)	0 (2)	1 (6)	0 (0)	0 (6)	**22** (126)	0.17
10	Forward	Tesho Akindele	Canada	2019–2022	19 (104)	0 (4)	1 (8)	0 (0)	1 (5)	**21** (121)	0.17

As of October 24, 2026

USOC = U.S. Open Cup; Continent = CONCACAF Champions League/Cup; Other = Other competitions include Leagues Cup and Campeones Cup

Bolded players are currently on the Orlando City SC roster.

=== Goalkeeping ===
- Youngest goalkeeper: Javier Otero – **21 years, 223 days** (against New York City FC, MLS, June 28, 2024)
- Oldest goalkeeper: Donovan Ricketts – **37 years, 341 days** (against D.C. United, MLS, May 14, 2015)
- Most saves in a single game: **12** – Maxime Crépeau vs. Columbus Crew, MLS, October 10, 2026

Most shutouts

Competitive, professional matches only, appearances including substitutes appear in brackets.

#	Name	Nationality	Years	MLS	Playoffs	USOC	Continent	Other	Total
1	Pedro Gallese	Peru	2020–2025	46 (164)	5 (12)	0 (4)	3 (5)	3 (17)	**57** (201)
2	Joe Bendik	United States	2016–2018	13 (92)	0 (0)	0 (0)	0 (0)	0 (0)	**13** (92)
3	Brian Rowe	United States	2019–2020	8 (36)	0 (1)	0 (0)	0 (0)	0 (0)	**8** (37)
4	Tally Hall	United States	2015	5 (23)	0 (0)	1 (2)	0 (0)	0 (0)	**6** (25)
5	**Maxime Crépeau**	Canada	2026–present	4 (30)	0 (0)	0 (1)	0 (0)	0 (2)	**4** (33)
6	Earl Edwards Jr.	United States	2015–2018	1 (6)	0 (0)	2 (6)	0 (0)	0 (0)	**3** (12)
6	Mason Stajduhar	United States	2021–2024	3 (16)	0 (0)	0 (4)	0 (1)	0 (1)	**3** (22)
8	**Javier Otero**	Venezuela	2023–present	0 (5)	0 (0)	2 (4)	0 (0)	0 (0)	**2** (9)
8	Donovan Ricketts	Jamaica	2015	2 (10)	0 (0)	0 (0)	0 (0)	0 (0)	**2** (10)
10	Brandon Austin	England	2021	1 (5)	0 (0)	0 (0)	0 (0)	0 (0)	**1** (5)
10	Josh Ford	United States	2015	1 (2)	0 (0)	0 (0)	0 (0)	0 (0)	**1** (2)
10	Adam Grinwis	United States	2018–2019; 2021–2023	1 (7)	0 (0)	0 (4)	0 (0)	0 (0)	**1** (11)

As of October 24, 2026

USOC = U.S. Open Cup; Continent = CONCACAF Champions League/Cup; Other = Other competitions include Leagues Cup and Campeones Cup

Bolded players are currently on the Orlando City SC roster.

== Team records ==
=== Record wins ===
- Record MLS win:

6–1 vs. New England Revolution, September 27, 2017
5–0 vs. San Jose Earthquakes, June 22, 2021
5–0 vs. D.C. United, July 6, 2024

- Record MLS Cup Playoffs win: 2–0 vs Charlotte FC, October 28, 2024
- Record U.S. Open Cup win: 5–1 vs New York Red Bulls, July 27, 2022
- Record continental win: 3–0 vs Cavalry FC, CONCACAF Champions Cup, February 21, 2024
- Record home win:

6–1 vs. New England Revolution, MLS, September 27, 2017
5–0 vs. San Jose Earthquakes, MLS, June 22, 2021
5–0 vs. D.C. United, MLS, July 6, 2024

- Record road win:

5–2 vs. New York Red Bulls, MLS, September 25, 2015
4–1 vs. Montreal Impact, MLS, September 7, 2016
3–0 vs. Montreal Impact, MLS, June 1, 2019
3–0 vs. New York Red Bulls, MLS, June 3, 2023

=== Record defeats ===
- Record MLS defeat: 0–6 vs. Los Angeles FC, April 4, 2026
- Record MLS Cup Playoffs defeat:

1–3 vs. New England Revolution, November 29, 2020
1–3 vs. Nashville SC, November 23, 2021
0–2 vs. CF Montréal, October 16, 2022
0–2 vs. Columbus Crew, November 25, 2023

- Record U.S. Open Cup defeat:

1–3 vs. Chicago Fire, July 22, 2015
1–3 vs. Miami FC, June 14, 2017
0–2 vs. Atlanta United FC, August 6, 2019

- Record continental defeat: 2–4 vs Tigres UANL, CONCACAF Champions Cup, March 12, 2024
- Record home defeat:

1–4 vs. Columbus Crew, MLS, September 17, 2016
0–3 vs. New York City FC, MLS, May 21, 2017
2–5 vs. Chicago Fire, MLS, October 6, 2019
0–3 vs. New York Red Bulls, MLS, April 24, 2022

- Record road defeat: 0–6 vs. Los Angeles FC, MLS, April 4, 2026

=== Highest scores ===
Orlando City score listed first

- Highest scoring MLS game: 8 goals

3–5 vs. New York City FC, July 26, 2015
3–5 vs. D.C. United, July 4, 2022

- Highest scoring MLS Cup Playoffs game: 4 goals, 1–3 vs. New England Revolution, November 29, 2020
- Highest scoring U.S. Open Cup game: 8 goals, 4–4 vs. Charleston Battery, June 17, 2015
- Highest scoring continental game: 6 goals 2–4 vs. Tigres UANL, CONCACAF Champions Cup, March 12, 2024
- Highest scoring home game: 8 goals, 3–5 vs. D.C. United, July 4, 2022
- Highest scoring road game: 8 goals

4–4 vs. Charleston Battery, U.S. Open Cup, June 17, 2015
3–5 vs. New York City FC, MLS, July 26, 2015

=== Streaks ===
- Longest unbeaten run (competitive matches): 12 matches

August 26, 2020 to October 24, 2020
March 15, 2025 to May 18, 2025

- Longest unbeaten run (MLS): 12 matches

August 26, 2020 to October 24, 2020
March 15, 2025 to May 24, 2025

- Longest winning streak (competitive matches): 6 matches

March 31, 2018 to May 13, 2018
September 30, 2023 to November 25, 2023

- Longest winning streak (MLS): 6 matches, March 31, 2018 to May 13, 2018
- Longest tying streak (competitive matches): 4 matches, March 4, 2023 to March 18, 2023
- Longest tying streak (MLS): 3 matches

May 25, 2016 to June 25, 2016
June 4, 2017 to June 24, 2017
October 7, 2020 to October 24, 2020
August 4, 2021 to August 21, 2021
April 5, 2025 to April 19, 2025

- Longest losing streak (competitive matches): 4 matches

July 11, 2015 to August 1, 2015
May 13, 2018 to June 6, 2018
July 18, 2018 to August 4, 2018
September 10, 2021 to September 29, 2021
August 27, 2025 to March 1, 2026

- Longest losing streak (MLS): 9 matches, May 13, 2018 to July 14, 2018
- Longest streak without a win (competitive matches): 14 matches, July 18, 2018 to October 21, 2018
- Longest streak without a win (MLS): 13 matches, July 21, 2018 to October 21, 2018
- Longest scoring run (competitive matches): 17 matches, March 6, 2016 to July 4, 2016
- Longest scoring run (MLS): 15 matches, March 6, 2016 to July 4, 2016
- Longest scoreless run (competitive matches): 5 matches, September 8, 2018 to October 17, 2018
- Longest scoreless run (MLS): 5 matches, September 8, 2018 to October 17, 2018
- Longest streak without conceding a goal (competitive matches): 5 matches

April 5, 2025 to May 3, 2025

- Longest streak without conceding a goal (MLS): 5 matches

April 5, 2025 to May 3, 2025

- Longest streak without a shutout (competitive matches): 17 matches, June 9, 2018 to September 22, 2018
- Longest streak without a shutout (MLS): 22 matches, April 21, 2018 to September 22, 2018

== Coaching records ==
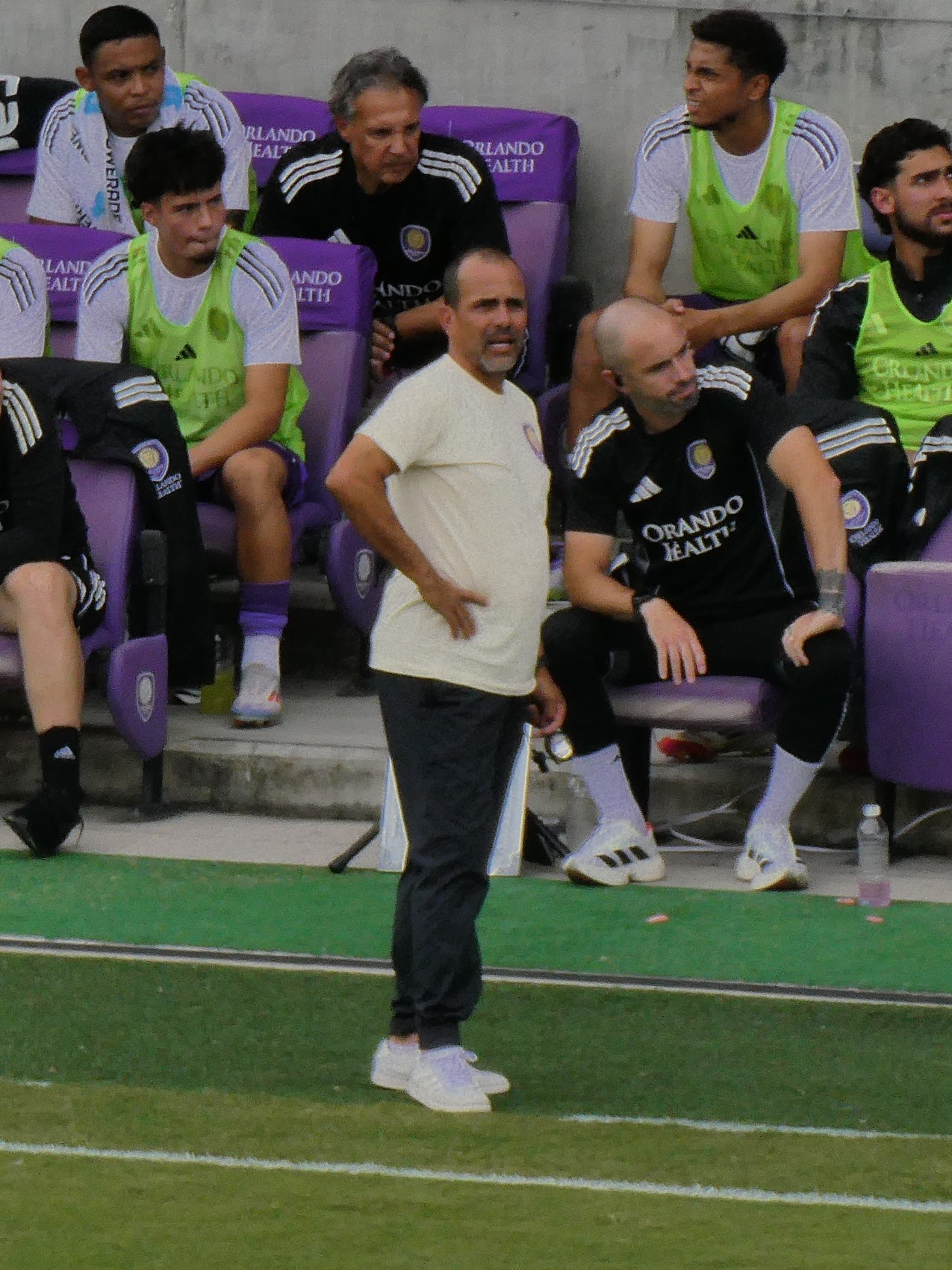
Óscar Pareja is the longest serving Orlando City head coach

- First head coach: Adrian Heath – Heath was Orlando City's first head coach, staying with the team following their MLS expansion having also coached the previous incarnation to two USL Pro League titles.
- Longest-serving head coach: Óscar Pareja – 6 years, 97 days (240 matches) (December 4, 2019 to March 11, 2026)

All-time Orlando City SC coaching stats (Note: Competitive matches only. Includes Major League Soccer, MLS Cup Playoffs, U.S. Open Cup, CONCACAF Champions League, Leagues Cup and MLS is Back Tournament)
Name	Nationality	From	To	P	W	D	L	GF	GA	Win% (Note: Win% is rounded to two decimal places)
Adrian Heath	England	November 21, 2014	July 6, 2016	55	18	17	20	83	94	32.73
Bobby Murphy (interim)	United States	July 7, 2016	July 23, 2016	4	0	3	1	4	6	0.00
Jason Kreis	United States	July 24, 2016	June 15, 2018	65	22	13	30	90	117	33.85
Bobby Murphy (interim)	United States	June 16, 2018	July 1, 2018	3	0	1	2	1	7	0.00
James O'Connor	Ireland	July 2, 2018	October 7, 2019	56	13	14	29	69	95	23.21
Óscar Pareja	Colombia	December 4, 2019	March 11, 2026	240	102	67	71	381	328	42.50
Martín Perelman (interim)	Argentina	March 11, 2026	present	35	17	6	12	71	72	48.57
Total				458	172	121	165	699	719	37.55

As of October 24, 2026

== List of seasons ==
Year	MLS Regular season							Position		Playoffs	USOC	Continent	Other		Top goalscorer(s) (Note: Goals scored in all competitions)	
Year	Pld	W	D	L	GF	GA	Pts	Conf.	Overall	Playoffs	USOC	Continent	Other		Player(s)	Goals
2015	34	12	8	14	46	56	44	7th	14th	DNQ	QF	DNE	N/A		(Canada) Cyle Larin	18
2016	34	9	14	11	55	60	41	8th	15th	DNQ	Ro16	DNQ	N/A		(Canada) Cyle Larin	14
2017	34	10	9	15	39	58	39	10th	18th	DNQ	R4	DNQ	N/A		(Canada) Cyle Larin	12
2018	34	8	4	22	43	74	28	11th	22nd	DNQ	QF	DNQ	N/A		(United States) Dom Dwyer	13
2019	34	9	10	15	44	52	37	11th	22nd	DNQ	SF	DNQ	DNQ		(Portugal) Nani	12
2020	23	11	8	4	40	25	41	4th	5th	QF	Canc.	DNQ	MLS is Back Tournament	RU	(United States) Chris Mueller	10
2021	34	13	12	9	50	48	51	6th	10th	R1	Canc.	DNQ	Leagues Cup	QF	(United States) Daryl Dike	11
2022	34	14	6	14	44	53	48	7th	13th	R1	W	DNQ	DNQ		(Uruguay) Facundo Torres	13
2023	34	18	9	7	55	39	63	2nd	2nd	QF	Ro32	Ro16	Leagues Cup	GS	(United States) Duncan McGuire	15
2024	34	15	7	12	59	50	52	4th	9th	SF	DNE	Ro16	Leagues Cup	Ro32	(Uruguay) Facundo Torres	20
2025	34	14	11	9	63	51	53	9th	14th	WC	Ro16	DNQ	Leagues Cup	4th	(Argentina) Martín Ojeda	20

== Average MLS regular season attendance ==
Season	Stadium	Average		Highest		Lowest	
Season	Stadium	Attendance	Change	Attendance	Fixture	Attendance	Fixture
2015	Citrus Bowl (Note: Renamed Camping World Stadium in April 2016)	32,847	–	62,510	vs. New York City FC	22,241	vs. Sporting Kansas City
2016	Citrus Bowl	31,323	−4.64%	60,147	vs. Real Salt Lake	23,802	vs. Toronto FC
2017	Orlando City Stadium (Note: Renamed Exploria Stadium in June 2019)	25,028	–	25,527 (Note: Sellout, first of ten in 2017)	vs. New York City FC	23,018	vs. New England Revolution
2018	Orlando City Stadium	23,979	−4.19%	25,527 (Note: Sellout, first of two in 2018)	vs. D.C. United	22,337	vs. Portland Timbers
2019	Orlando City Stadium	22,761	−5.08%	25,527 (Note: Sellout)	vs. New York City FC	22,341	vs. FC Cincinnati
2020	Orlando City Stadium	6,346 (Note: Attendance for MLS matches were restricted during the 2020 season due to the COVID-19 pandemic following Orlando City's first home match)	–	25,527 (Note: Sellout)	vs. Real Salt Lake	2,745	vs. New York City FC
2021	Orlando City Stadium	15,644	–	19,009	vs. New York Red Bulls	11,503	vs. New York City FC
2022	Orlando City Stadium	17,283	+10.48%	21,693	vs. Columbus Crew	14,483	vs. Seattle Sounders FC
2023	Orlando City Stadium	20,590	+19.13%	25,527	vs. Inter Miami CF	17,012	vs. New York City FC
2024	Orlando City Stadium	22,804	+10.75%	25,046	vs. Atlanta United FC	20,985	vs. Austin FC

== Individual honors ==
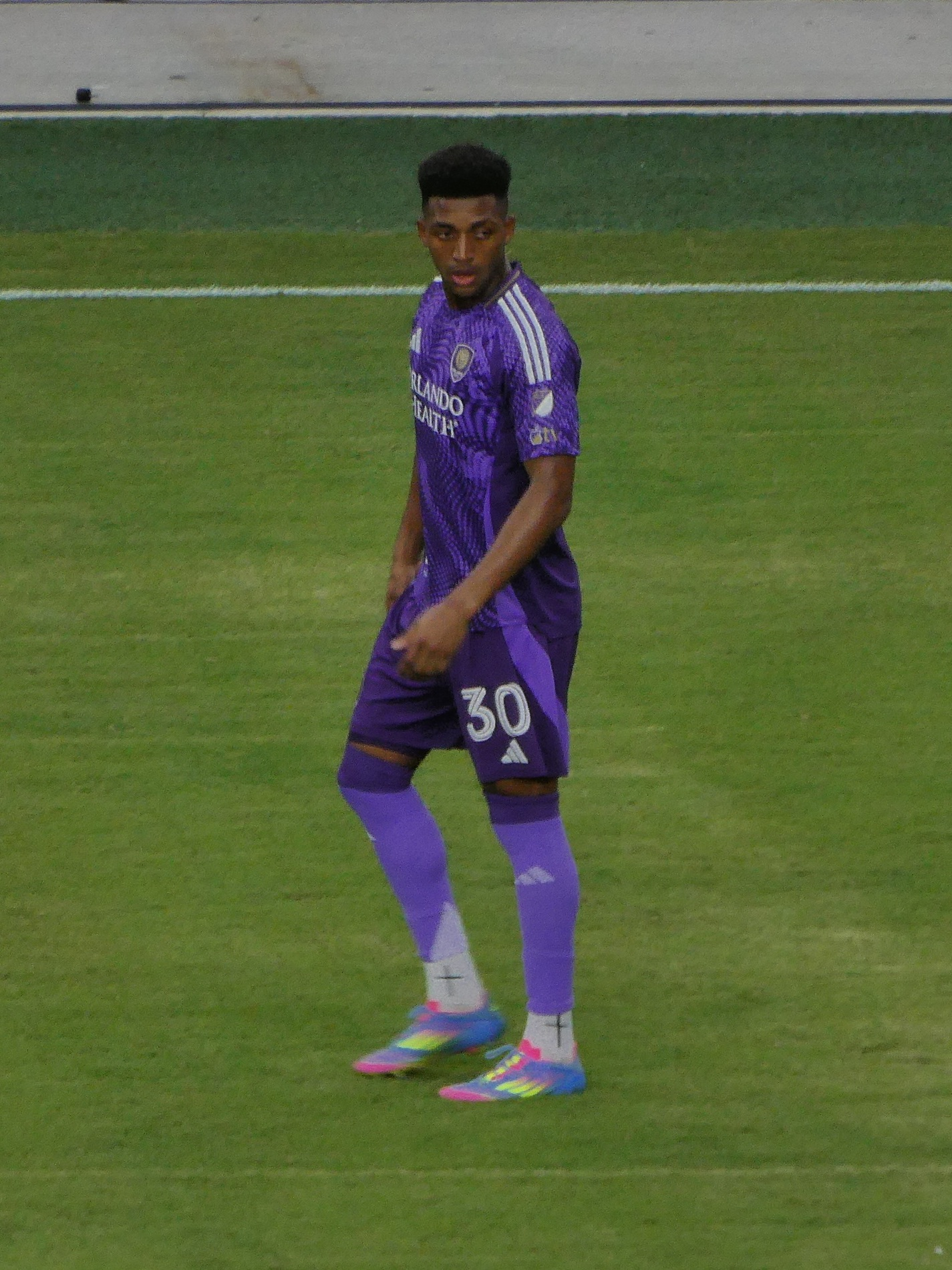
Alex Freeman was the first player in team history to be named to the MLS Best XI and he also won the MLS Young Player of the Year Award in the same season.

=== MLS Best XI ===
Year	Player	Ref
2025	(United States) Alex Freeman	

=== MLS Newcomer of the Year Award ===
Year	Player	Ref
2026	(France) Antoine Griezmann	

=== MLS Young Player of the Year Award ===
Year	Player	Ref
2015	(Canada) Cyle Larin	
2025	(United States) Alex Freeman	

=== MLS All-Star ===
Year	Player	Notes	Opposition	Venue	Ref
2015	(Brazil) Kaká	45', (c), and MVP	(England) Tottenham Hotspur	(Colorado) Dick's Sporting Goods Park	
2016	(Brazil) Kaká	45', (c)	(England) Arsenal	(California) Avaya Stadium	
2016	(Canada) Cyle Larin	13'	(England) Arsenal	(California) Avaya Stadium	
2017	(Brazil) Kaká	45'	(Spain) Real Madrid	(Illinois) Soldier Field	
2017	(United States) Dom Dwyer	45',	(Spain) Real Madrid	(Illinois) Soldier Field	
2018	(Peru) Yoshimar Yotún	27'	(Italy) Juventus	(Georgia (U.S. state)) Mercedes-Benz Stadium	
2019	(Portugal) Nani	45'	(Spain) Atlético Madrid	(Florida) Exploria Stadium	
2020	Canceled due to the COVID-19 pandemic				
2021	(Peru) Pedro Gallese	30'	(Mexico) Liga MX All-Stars	Banc of California Stadium	
2021	(Portugal) Nani	14'	(Mexico) Liga MX All-Stars	Banc of California Stadium	
2022	No players selected				
2023	No players selected				
2024	No players selected				
2025	(United States) Alex Freeman	61'	(Mexico) Liga MX All-Stars	(Texas) Q2 Stadium	
2025	(Croatia) Marco Pašalić	34'	(Mexico) Liga MX All-Stars	(Texas) Q2 Stadium	
2026	(Canada) Maxime Crépeau	63'	(Mexico) Liga MX All-Stars	(North Carolina) Bank of America Stadium	

== Transfer records ==
As per MLS policy, transfer fees are not disclosed and the figures shown are reported fees. Totals may also include allocation money.

In February 2017, MLS lifted its policy to not publicly disclose the figures of allocation money involved in intra-league trades, allowing for greater transparency. Prior to this, figures were either not known or reported by journalists but never official.

=== Highest transfer fees paid ===
#	Pos.	Player	Club	Fee	Date	Ref
1	Forward	(Uruguay) Facundo Torres	(Uruguay) Peñarol	$9,000,000	January 24, 2022	
2	Forward	(Brazil) Tiago	(Brazil) Bahia	$6,000,000	December 19, 2025	
3	Forward	(Croatia) Marco Pašalić	(Croatia) HNK Rijeka	$5,000,000	February 5, 2025	
4	Forward	(Argentina) Martín Ojeda	(Argentina) Godoy Cruz	$4,000,000	January 7, 2023	
5	Midfielder	(Brazil) Luis Otávio	(Brazil) Internacional	$3,200,000	December 26, 2025	
6	Midfielder	(Paraguay) Josué Colmán	(Paraguay) Cerro Porteño	$3,000,000	January 15, 2018	
7	Defender	(Slovenia) David Brekalo	(Norway) Viking FK	$2,500,000	February 8, 2024	
8	Midfielder	(Uruguay) César Araújo	(Uruguay) Montevideo Wanderers	$2,000,000	January 7, 2022	
8	Forward	(Argentina) Ramiro Enrique	(Argentina) Banfield	$2,000,000	January 26, 2023	
10	Midfielder	(Ecuador) Sebas Méndez	(Ecuador) Independiente del Valle	$1,800,000	December 28, 2018	

=== Progression of record fee paid ===
Amobi Okugo was one of the first players to be signed by the club using allocation money ahead of the inaugural 2015 season, costing a reported $100,000 from Philadelphia Union in December 2014. This figure was not reportedly surpassed until the arrival of David Mateos in July 2015 although the transfer of Bryan Róchez from Honduran club Real España in December 2014 was financially significant enough to be a Designated Player deal despite no figures ever being reported. In July 2017, Orlando set a record for a trade between two MLS teams when they sent $1,600,000 in allocation money to Sporting Kansas City for Dom Dwyer. A new club record was set in January 2018 when Orlando paid $3,000,000 to Paraguayan club Cerro Porteño for the transfer of teenager Josué Colmán. Colmán's fee stood as a record for four years until Orlando, under new ownership by the Wilf family, spent $9,000,000 on 21-year-old Uruguay international Facundo Torres.

Date	Pos.	Player	Club	Fee	Ref
December 8, 2014	Midfielder	(United States) Amobi Okugo	(United States) Philadelphia Union	$100,000	
July 29, 2015	Defender	(Spain) David Mateos	(Hungary) Ferencváros	$221,200	
July 25, 2017	Forward	(United States) Dom Dwyer	(United States) Sporting Kansas City	$1,600,000	
January 15, 2018	Midfielder	(Paraguay) Josué Colmán	(Paraguay) Cerro Porteño	$3,000,000	
January 24, 2022	Forward	(Uruguay) Facundo Torres	(Uruguay) Peñarol	$9,000,000	

=== Highest transfer fees received ===
#	Pos.	Player	Club	Fee	Date	Ref
1	Forward	(Uruguay) Facundo Torres	(Brazil) Palmeiras	$14,000,000	December 20, 2024	
2	Forward	(United States) Daryl Dike	(England) West Bromwich Albion	$9,500,000	January 1, 2022	
3	Defender	(United States) Alex Freeman	(Spain) Villarreal	$4,000,000	January 29, 2026	
3	Midfielder	(Peru) Yoshimar Yotún	(Mexico) Cruz Azul	$4,000,000	December 27, 2018	
5	Forward	(Argentina) Ramiro Enrique	(Saudi Arabia) Al-Kholood	$3,300,000	September 8, 2025	
6	Forward	(Canada) Cyle Larin	(Turkey) Beşiktaş	$2,300,000	January 30, 2018	
7	Forward	(United States) Duncan McGuire	(United States) Houston Dynamo FC	$1,250,000	July 10, 2026	
8	Midfielder	(Iraq) Justin Meram	(United States) Columbus Crew	$750,000	August 3, 2018	
8	Midfielder	(United States) Andrés Perea	(United States) Philadelphia Union	$750,000	December 6, 2022	
10	Midfielder	(Trinidad and Tobago) Kevin Molino	(United States) Minnesota United	$650,000	January 26, 2017	

=== Progression of record fee received ===
The trade between Orlando City and Minnesota United FC for Kevin Molino in January 2017 was the first time Orlando had received a transfer fee: a total of $650,000 in allocation money. This was surpassed when Turkish club Beşiktaş negotiated a $2,300,000 fee for Cyle Larin in January 2018, the first draft pick in the club's history from the 2015 MLS SuperDraft. The record increased to $4,000,000 when Yoshimar Yotún was sold at the end of the 2018 season to Mexican club Cruz Azul. Another draft pick, Daryl Dike, broke that record in January 2022 when his sale to West Bromwich Albion amounted to $9,500,000. That stood until December 2024 when Facundo Torres, Orlando's record purchase three years earlier, was sold for $14,000,000 to Palmeiras.

Date	Pos.	Player	Club	Fee	Ref
January 26, 2017	Midfielder	(Trinidad and Tobago) Kevin Molino	(United States) Minnesota United FC	$650,000	
January 30, 2018	Forward	(Canada) Cyle Larin	(Turkey) Beşiktaş	$2,300,000	
December 27, 2018	Midfielder	(Peru) Yoshimar Yotún	(Mexico) Cruz Azul	$4,000,000	
January 1, 2022	Forward	(United States) Daryl Dike	(England) West Bromwich Albion	$9,500,000	
December 20, 2024	Forward	(Uruguay) Facundo Torres	(Brazil) Palmeiras	$14,000,000	

== Designated players ==
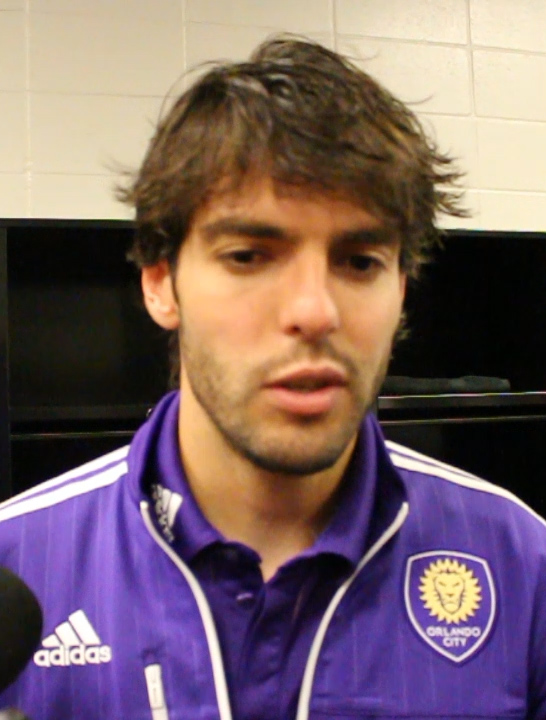
Kaká was the club's first ever designated player.

Player	Previous club	Years as DP
(Brazil) Kaká	(Italy) AC Milan	2015–2017
(Colombia) Carlos Rivas	(Colombia) Deportivo Cali	2015–2017
(Honduras) Bryan Róchez	(Honduras) Real España	2015–2016
(Argentina) Matías Pérez García	(United States) San Jose Earthquakes	2016–2017
(Jamaica) Giles Barnes	(Canada) Vancouver Whitecaps FC	2017
(Peru) Yoshimar Yotún	(Sweden) Malmö FF	2017
(United States) Dom Dwyer	(United States) Sporting Kansas City	2018–2020
(United States) Sacha Kljestan	(United States) New York Red Bulls	2018
(Paraguay) Josué Colmán	(Paraguay) Cerro Porteño	2018–2019
(Portugal) Nani	(Portugal) Sporting CP	2019–2021
(Uruguay) Mauricio Pereyra	(Russia) FC Krasnodar	2019–2022
(Uruguay) Facundo Torres	(Uruguay) Peñarol	2022–2024
(Austria) Ercan Kara	(Austria) Rapid Wien	2022–2023
(Argentina) **Martín Ojeda**	(Argentina) Godoy Cruz	2023–present
(Colombia) Luis Muriel	(Italy) Atalanta	2024–2026
(Croatia) **Marco Pašalić**	(Croatia) HNK Rijeka	2025–present
(Paraguay) **Braian Ojeda**	(United States) Real Salt Lake	2026
(France) **Antoine Griezmann**	(Spain) Atlético Madrid	2026–present

Bolded players are currently on the Orlando City SC roster.

== Homegrown players ==
Player	Years	Ref
(United States) Tommy Redding	2015–2017	
(United States) Tyler Turner	2015–2016	
(England) Harrison Heath	2015–2016	
(United States) Mason Stajduhar	2016–2024	
(United States) Benji Michel	2019–2022	
(United States) David Loera	2020–2021	
(United States) Jordan Bender	2020–2021	
(United States) Michael Halliday	2020–2024	
(Puerto Rico) Wilfredo Rivera	2021–2023	
(United States) Raul Aguilera	2021	
(United States) Thomas Williams	2021–2025	
(United States) Alex Freeman	2022–2026	
(Chile) Favian Loyola	2023–2025	
(Venezuela) **Javier Otero**	2023–present	
(United States) **Tahir Reid-Brown**	2024–present	
(United States) **Colin Guske**	2025–present	
(Venezuela) **Gustavo Caraballo**	2025–present	
(United States) **Zakaria Taifi**	2025–present	
(United States) **Justin Ellis**	2026–present	
(United States) **Tristan Himes**	2026–present	
(Canada) **Clovis Archange**	2026–present	
(Brazil) **Bernardo Rhein**	2026–present	

Bolded players are currently on the Orlando City SC roster.

== MLS SuperDraft picks ==
Below is a list of players Orlando City has selected in an MLS SuperDraft. A total of 39 players have been drafted by Orlando.

All-time Orlando City MLS SuperDraft picks
Draft	Round	Selection	Player	Position	College team
2015	1	1	(Canada) Cyle Larin	FW	(Connecticut) UConn Huskies
2015	2	22	(United States) Conor Donovan	DF	(North Carolina) NC State Wolfpack
2015	2	25	(Jamaica) Akeil Barrett	FW	(Oklahoma) Tulsa Golden Hurricane
2015	3	43	(United States) Earl Edwards Jr.	GK	(California) UCLA Bruins
2015	4	63	(Puerto Rico) Sidney Rivera	FW	(Virginia) Old Dominion Monarchs
2016	1	7	(Canada) Richie Laryea	MF	(Ohio) Akron Zips
2016	1	13	(Guinea) Hadji Barry	MF	(Florida) UCF Knights
2016	3	48	(United States) Antonio Matarazzo	MF	(New York (state)) Columbia Lions
2016	4	68	(Nigeria) Tobenna Uzo	FW	(South Carolina) Coastal Carolina Chanticleers
2017	3	64	(England) Danny Deakin	FW	South Carolina Gamecocks
2018	1	6	(United States) Chris Mueller	FW	Wisconsin Badgers
2019	1	3	(Colombia) Santiago Patiño	FW	(Florida) FIU Panthers
2019	2	27	(Canada) Kamal Miller	DF	(New York (state)) Syracuse Orange
2019	2	38	(United States) Tommy Madden	DF	(North Carolina) Charlotte 49ers
2019	3	59	(United States) Scott DeVoss	DF	(Colorado) Denver Pioneers
2020	1	5	(United States) **Daryl Dike**	FW	Virginia Cavaliers
2020	2	31	(Jamaica) Joey DeZart	MF	(North Carolina) Wake Forest Demon Deacons
2020	2	39	(United States) Jonathan Dean	DF	(Florida) UCF Knights
2020	2	44	(United States) Austin Aviza	GK	(Rhode Island) Providence Friars
2020	3	57	(United States) Nick O'Callaghan	DF	(Florida) FIU Panthers
2021	1	8	(United States) Derek Dodson	FW	(Washington, D.C.) Georgetown Hoyas
2021	1	19	(United States) Rio Hope-Gund	DF	(Washington, D.C.) Georgetown Hoyas
2021	1	22	(United States) Brandon Hackenberg	DF	(Pennsylvania) Penn State Nittany Lions
2021	2	49	(United States) Andrew Pannenberg	GK	(North Carolina) Wake Forest Demon Deacons
2022	1	18	(United States) Jack Lynn	FW	(Indiana) Notre Dame Fighting Irish
2022	2	46	(Canada) Nathan Dossantos	DF	(West Virginia) Marshall Thundering Herd
2022	3	74	(Cambodia) Nick Taylor	FW	(Florida) UCF Knights
2023	1	2	(Ghana) Shak Mohammed	FW	(North Carolina) Duke Blue Devils
2023	1	6	(United States) Duncan McGuire	FW	(Nebraska) Creighton Bluejays
2023	1	17	(Somalia) Abdi Salim	DF	(New York (state)) Syracuse Orange
2023	2	46	(Germany) Luis Grassow	DF	Kentucky Wildcats
2024	1	21	(United States) Jeorgio Kocevski	MF	(New York (state)) Syracuse Orange
2024	1	25	(Japan) **Yutaro Tsukada**	FW	West Virginia Mountaineers
2024	2	54	(United States) Filip Mirkovic	MF	(Pennsylvania) Pittsburgh Panthers
2024	3	83	(Japan) Riyon Tori	MF	(North Carolina) Charlotte 49ers
2025	1	27	(France) **Joran Gerbet**	MF	(South Carolina) Clemson Tigers
2025	2	46	(Dominica) Titus Sandy Jr	DF	(South Carolina) Clemson Tigers
2025	2	57	(Ghana) Collins Oduro	FW	Indiana Hoosiers
2025	3	87	(Japan) Takahiro Fujita	DF	(West Virginia) Marshall Thundering Herd
2026	1	5	(United States) **Harvey Sarajian**	FW	(North Carolina) Wake Forest Demon Deacons
2026	1	9	(United States) **Nolan Miller**	DF	Michigan Wolverines
2026	1	14	(Trinidad and Tobago) Jaylen Yearwood	DF	North Florida Ospreys
2026	1	20	(Ghana) Issah Haruna	MF	(North Carolina) UNC Greensboro Spartans
2026	3	74	(United States) Mitch Ferguson	DF	(Louisiana) Notre Dame Fighting Irish

Bolded players are currently on the Orlando City SC roster.

== Internationals ==
Below is a list of players capped internationally while with Orlando City and the number of caps they earned during that time. A total of 32 players have represented 17 different senior national teams during their Orlando City tenure. Players are listed according to the date of their first senior international appearance while under contract with Orlando.

Note: Countries indicate national team as defined under FIFA eligibility rules. Players may hold more than one non-FIFA nationality.

Debuted while with Orlando

Player	Nation	Years	Caps
Brek Shea	United States	2015–2016	7
Kevin Molino	Trinidad and Tobago	2015–2016	6
Darwin Cerén	El Salvador	2015–2016	12
Cyle Larin	Canada	2015–2017	18
Kaká	Brazil	2015–2017	3
Bryan Róchez	Honduras	2015–2017	1
Will Johnson	Canada	2017–2019	4
Yoshimar Yotún	Peru	2017–2018	18
Dom Dwyer	United States	2017–2020	1
Justin Meram	Iraq	2018	2
Mohamed El Monir	Libya	2018	3
Amro Tarek	Egypt	2018	1
Sebas Méndez	Ecuador	2019–2022	25
Kamal Miller	Canada	2019–2020	5
Carlos Ascues	Peru	2018–2019	2
Tesho Akindele	Canada	2019–2022	5
Pedro Gallese	Peru	2020–2025	130
Chris Mueller	United States	2018–2021	2
Daniel Rosario	Puerto Rico	2020–2021	5
Wilfredo Rivera	Puerto Rico	2020–2024	26
Andrés Perea	United States	2020–2022	1
**Daryl Dike**	United States	2020–2021	10
Ian Silva	Puerto Rico	2022–2023	11
Nick Taylor	Cambodia	2022	22
Facundo Torres	Uruguay	2022–2024	23
**Wilder Cartagena**	Peru	2022–present	44
Abdi Salim	Somalia	2023–2024	5
Nabilai Kibunguchy	Kenya	2023–2024	1
Dagur Dan Þórhallsson	Iceland	2023–2025	10
Duncan McGuire	United States	2023–2026	1
**David Brekalo**	Slovenia	2024–present	32
César Araújo	Uruguay	2022–2025	1
**Javier Otero**	Venezuela	2022–present	1
**Maxime Crépeau**	Canada	2026–present	37
Alex Freeman	United States	2022–2025	26
**Marco Pašalić**	Croatia	2025–present	20
**Tyrese Spicer**	Trinidad and Tobago	2025–present	12
**Braian Ojeda**	Paraguay	2026–present	18
**Titus Sandy Jr**	Dominica	2025–present	2
**Justin Ellis**	United States	2026–present	3

As of October 6, 2026

Academy or Orlando City B contract, never signed to Orlando City SC.

Bolded players are currently on the Orlando City SC roster.

== Record by opponent ==
=== Major League Soccer ===
Orlando City joined MLS in 2015 and competes as a member of the Eastern Conference. The team qualified for the MLS Cup Playoffs for the first time in 2020 after failing to make the postseason the previous five seasons, snapping the joint second-longest MLS playoff drought in history at the time.

==== Regular season ====
Team competes in Eastern Conference
Team competes in Western Conference

Orlando City league record by opponent
Opponent	P	W	D	L	P	W	D	L	P	W	D	L	GF	GA	Win%	First
Opponent	Home				Away				Total						Win%	First
(United States) Austin FC	1	1	0	0	1	0	1	0	2	1	1	0	4	2	50.00	May 22, 2022
(United States) Atlanta United FC	11	2	3	6	10	2	4	4	21	4	7	10	22	31	19.05	July 21, 2017
(United States) Charlotte FC	3	2	0	1	3	1	2	0	6	3	2	1	10	7	50.00	April 30, 2022
(United States) Chicago Fire	10	5	3	2	10	3	4	3	20	8	7	5	30	31	40.00	June 6, 2015
(United States) FC Cincinnati	5	2	1	2	6	3	2	1	11	5	3	3	16	8	45.45	May 19, 2019
(United States) Colorado Rapids	4	4	0	0	4	1	2	1	8	5	2	1	14	7	62.50	June 24, 2015
(United States) Columbus Crew	12	7	2	3	9	2	2	5	21	9	4	8	38	39	42.86	April 18, 2015
(United States) FC Dallas	4	1	1	2	4	1	1	2	8	2	2	4	6	12	25.00	July 11, 2015
(United States) D.C. United	10	5	1	4	9	3	1	5	19	8	2	9	32	31	42.11	April 3, 2015
(United States) Houston Dynamo	3	1	2	0	3	1	0	2	6	2	2	2	4	5	33.33	March 13, 2015
(United States) Inter Miami CF	7	3	4	0	6	2	0	4	13	5	4	4	16	20	38.46	July 8, 2020
(United States) LA Galaxy	4	3	0	1	3	1	0	2	7	4	0	3	14	10	57.14	May 17, 2015
(United States) Los Angeles FC	3	0	1	2	1	0	0	1	4	0	1	3	6	13	0.00	July 7, 2018
(United States) Minnesota United FC	2	0	0	2	3	1	1	1	5	1	1	3	6	8	20.00	May 27, 2017
(Canada) CF Montréal	11	4	3	4	11	4	2	5	22	8	5	9	32	34	36.36	March 28, 2015
(United States) Nashville SC	5	2	1	2	5	2	3	0	10	4	4	2	17	11	40.00	August 26, 2020
(United States) New England Revolution	10	4	5	1	9	1	2	6	19	5	7	7	36	41	26.32	May 8, 2015
(United States) New York City FC	13	5	6	2	11	2	2	7	24	7	8	9	29	43	29.17	March 8, 2015
(United States) New York Red Bulls	10	4	2	4	11	4	1	6	21	8	3	10	27	29	38.10	July 19, 2015
(United States) Philadelphia Union	10	3	5	2	10	4	1	5	20	7	6	7	29	36	35.00	August 8, 2015
(United States) Portland Timbers	2	2	0	0	4	1	2	1	6	3	2	1	11	8	50.00	April 12, 2015
(United States) Real Salt Lake	3	1	2	0	4	1	1	2	7	2	3	2	8	10	28.57	July 4, 2015
(United States) San Jose Earthquakes	3	2	1	0	4	1	2	1	7	3	3	1	13	9	42.86	May 24, 2015
(United States) Seattle Sounders FC	3	1	0	2	4	0	2	2	7	1	2	4	7	14	14.29	August 16, 2015
(United States) Sporting Kansas City	3	2	1	0	5	1	1	3	8	3	2	3	10	11	37.50	September 13, 2015
(United States) St. Louis City SC	1	1	0	0	0	0	0	0	1	1	0	0	2	1	100.00	August 26, 2023
(Canada) Toronto FC	10	5	0	5	11	4	3	4	21	9	3	9	30	32	42.86	April 26, 2015
(Canada) Vancouver Whitecaps FC	3	1	0	2	2	0	1	1	5	1	1	3	6	10	20.00	March 21, 2015
Total	166	73	44	49	163	46	43	74	329	119	87	123	473	515	36.17	

During the 2020 season, Orlando competed in the MLS is Back Tournament. While the group stage games were counted towards the MLS regular season standings, the knockout round fixtures were not. The results of those games are listed below:

July 25 Round of 16	Orlando City	1–0	Montreal Impact	Orlando, Florida
8:00pm	Akindele 60'	Report		Stadium: ESPN Wide World of Sports Complex; Attendance: Behind-closed-doors; Referee: Marcos De Oliveira

July 31 Quarter-final	Orlando City	1–1 (5–4 p)	Los Angeles FC	Orlando, Florida
7:30pm	Moutinho 90'	Report	Wright-Phillips 60'	Stadium: ESPN Wide World of Sports Complex; Attendance: Behind-closed-doors; Referee: Joseph Dickerson
	Penalties
	Pereyra (penalty scored); Smith (penalty scored); Moutinho (penalty scored); Carlos (penalty scored); Nani (penalty scored)		(penalty scored) Ginella; (penalty missed) Harvey; (penalty scored) Rossi; (penalty scored) Rodríguez; (penalty scored) Blessing

August 6 Semi-final	Orlando City	3–1	Minnesota United FC	Orlando, Florida
8:00pm	Nani 36', 42'; Michel 90+6'	Report	Toye 83'	Stadium: ESPN Wide World of Sports Complex; Attendance: Behind-closed-doors; Referee: Drew Fischer
Note: Kickoff delayed until 9:20pm due to lightning

August 11 Final	Portland Timbers	2–1	Orlando City	Orlando, Florida
8:30pm	Mabiala 27'; Župarić 66'	Report	Pereyra 39'	Stadium: ESPN Wide World of Sports Complex; Attendance: Behind-closed-doors; Referee: Ismail Elfath

==== MLS Cup Playoffs ====
Orlando City playoff record by opponent
Opponent	P	W	D	L	P	W	D	L	P	W	D	L	GF	GA	Win%	First
Opponent	Home				Away				Total						Win%	First
(United States) Atlanta United FC	1	1	0	0	0	0	0	0	1	1	0	0	1	0	100.00	November 24, 2024
(United States) Charlotte FC	2	1	1	0	1	0	1	0	3	1	2	0	3	1	33.33	October 28, 2024
(United States) Columbus Crew	1	0	0	1	0	0	0	0	1	0	0	1	0	2	0.00	November 25, 2023
(Canada) CF Montréal	0	0	0	0	1	0	0	1	1	0	0	1	0	2	0.00	October 16, 2022
(United States) Nashville SC	1	1	0	0	2	1	0	1	3	2	0	1	3	3	66.67	November 23, 2021
(United States) New England Revolution	1	0	0	1	0	0	0	0	1	0	0	1	1	3	0.00	November 29, 2020
(United States) New York City FC	1	0	1	0	0	0	0	0	1	0	1	0	1	1	0.00	November 21, 2020
(United States) New York Red Bulls	1	0	0	1	0	0	0	0	1	0	0	1	0	1	0.00	November 30, 2024
Total	8	3	2	3	4	1	1	2	12	4	3	5	9	13	33.33	

=== U.S. Open Cup ===
Orlando City has competed in the U.S. Open Cup since 2015. The team won the competition in 2022, the first trophy of their MLS era. The club's previous best result as a USL team was reaching the quarter-finals in 2013.

Orlando City Open Cup record by opponent
Opponent	P	W	D	L	P	W	D	L	P	W	D	L	GF	GA	Win%	First
Opponent	Home				Away				Total						Win%	First
(Georgia (U.S. state)) Atlanta United FC	1	0	0	1	0	0	0	0	1	0	0	1	0	2	0.00	August 6, 2019
(South Carolina) Charleston Battery	0	0	0	0	1	0	1	0	1	0	1	0	4	4	0.00	June 17, 2015
(North Carolina) Charlotte FC	0	0	0	0	1	0	0	1	1	0	0	1	0	1	0.00	May 9, 2023
(Illinois) Chicago Fire	0	0	0	0	1	0	0	1	1	0	0	1	1	3	0.00	July 22, 2015
(Ohio) Columbus Crew	1	1	0	0	0	0	0	0	1	1	0	0	2	0	100.00	June 30, 2015
(Washington, D.C.) D.C. United	0	0	0	0	1	0	1	0	1	0	1	0	1	1	0.00	June 20, 2018
(Florida) Fort Lauderdale Strikers	1	0	0	1	0	0	0	0	1	0	0	1	1	2	0.00	June 29, 2016
(Florida) Inter Miami CF	1	0	1	0	0	0	0	0	1	0	1	0	1	1	0.00	May 25, 2022
(Florida) Jacksonville Armada	0	0	0	0	1	1	0	0	1	1	0	0	1	0	100.00	June 15, 2016
(Tennessee) Memphis 901	0	0	0	0	1	1	0	0	1	1	0	0	3	1	100.00	June 12, 2019
(Florida) Miami FC	1	0	0	1	0	0	0	0	1	0	0	1	1	3	0.00	June 14, 2017
(Florida) Miami United	0	0	0	0	1	1	0	0	1	1	0	0	3	0	100.00	June 6, 2018
(Tennessee) Nashville SC	1	0	1	0	0	0	0	0	1	0	1	0	1	1	0.00	June 29, 2022
(Massachusetts) New England Revolution	1	1	0	0	0	0	0	0	1	1	0	0	2	1	100.00	June 19, 2019
(New York (state)) New York City FC	1	0	1	0	0	0	0	0	1	0	1	0	1	1	0.00	July 10, 2019
(New Jersey) New York Red Bulls	1	1	0	0	0	0	0	0	1	1	0	0	5	1	100.00	July 27, 2019
(Pennsylvania) Philadelphia Union	1	1	0	0	1	0	0	1	2	1	0	1	2	2	50.00	July 18, 2018
(California) Sacramento Republic	1	1	0	0	0	0	0	0	1	1	0	0	3	0	100.00	September 7, 2022
(Florida) Tampa Bay Rowdies	1	1	0	0	0	0	0	0	1	1	0	0	2	1	100.00	April 20, 2022
Total	12	6	3	3	8	3	2	3	20	9	5	6	34	25	45	

=== CONCACAF Champions League/Cup ===
Orlando City first qualified for the CONCACAF Champions League for the 2023 season having earned a berth as 2022 U.S. Open Cup champions.

Matches

Season	Round	Opposition	Home (Note: Orlando City score listed first)	Away	Aggregate
2023	Round of 16	(Mexico) Tigres UANL	1–1	0–0	1–1 (Note: Eliminated on away goals)
2024	Round one	(Canada) Cavalry FC	3–1	3–0	6–1
2024	Round of 16	(Mexico) Tigres UANL	0–0	2–4	2–4

Summary

Orlando City CONCACAF Champions League/Cup record by opponent
Opponent	P	W	D	L	P	W	D	L	P	W	D	L	GF	GA	Win%	First
Opponent	Home				Away				Total						Win%	First
(Canada) Cavalry FC	1	1	0	0	1	1	0	0	2	2	0	0	6	1	100.00	February 21, 2024
(Mexico) Tigres UANL	2	0	2	0	2	0	1	1	4	0	3	1	3	5	0.00	March 7, 2023
Total	3	1	2	0	3	1	1	1	6	2	3	1	9	6	33.33	

=== Other competitions ===
==== Leagues Cup ====
Orlando City first qualified for the Leagues Cup for the 2021 season as one of the top two teams from each conference based on the 2020 regular season standings not scheduled to participate in the Champions League, marking the first time the club had qualified for any continental competition. The competition's format changed in 2023 to include every team from both Major League Soccer and Liga MX.

Orlando City Leagues Cup record by opponent
Opponent	P	W	D	L	GF	GA	Win%	First
(Mexico) Atlético San Luis	1	0	1	0	1	1	0.00	August 4, 2024
(Canada) CF Montréal	1	1	0	0	4	1	100.00	July 26, 2024
(Mexico) Cruz Azul	1	0	1	0	0	0	0.00	August 9, 2024
(United States) Houston Dynamo	1	0	1	0	1	1	0.00	July 21, 2023
(United States) Inter Miami CF	1	0	0	1	1	3	0.00	August 2, 2023
(Mexico) Santos Laguna	2	1	0	1	3	3	50.00	August 12, 2021
Total	7	2	3	2	10	9	28.57	

=== International friendlies ===
Additionally, Orlando City has featured in a number of friendlies against international opposition.

May 2, 2015	Orlando City	3–2	(Brazil) Ponte Preta	Orlando, Florida
7:30pm	Róchez 45+1'; St. Ledger 55'; Larin 90+2' (pen.)	Report	Tiago Alves 11'; Renato Cajá 59'	Stadium: Citrus Bowl; Attendance: 20,501

July 15, 2015	Orlando City	3–1	(England) West Bromwich Albion	Orlando, Florida
7:30pm	Kaká 45+2'; Rivas 49'; Róchez 87'	Report	McManaman 14'	Stadium: Citrus Bowl; Attendance: 15,172

November 15, 2015	Flamengo (Brazil)	1–0	Orlando City	Rio de Janeiro, Brazil
11:30pm	Luiz Antônio 67'	Report		Stadium: Estádio do Maracanã; Attendance: 12,371

February 27, 2016	Orlando City	6–1	(Brazil) Bahia	Orlando, Florida
6:00pm	Hines 12', 58', 71', 86'; Ribeiro 78'; Cerén 88'	Report	Zé Roberto 1'	Stadium: Camping World Stadium; Referee: Ted Unkel

November 4, 2017	Orlando City	6–1	Puerto Rico	Orlando, Florida
7:30pm	Dwyer 39'; Larin 59', 90+1'; Barry 69'; Hines 79'; Rocha 86'	Report	Cabán 19'	Stadium: Orlando City Stadium; Attendance: 8,231
Note: Fundraiser for Puerto Rico Relief in aftermath of Hurricane Maria; Kaka's final match for Orlando City

February 18, 2020	Orlando City	3–1	(Iceland) KR Reykjavík	Orlando, Florida
6:00pm	Nani 2', 42'; Michel 8'	Report	Sævarsson 22'	Stadium: Exploria Stadium

July 20, 2022 2022 Florida Cup	Orlando City	1–3	(England) Arsenal	Orlando, Florida
8:30pm	Jansson (yellow card) 13'; Torres 29'; Smith (yellow card) 61'; Ruan (yellow card) 90+3'	Report	Holding (yellow card) 2'; Martinelli 5'; Maitland-Niles (yellow card) 19'; Nketiah 66'; Nelson 80'	Stadium: Exploria Stadium; Attendance: 19,738; Referee: Kevin Broadley

January 27, 2024 2024 FC Series	Orlando City	1–1	(Brazil) Flamengo	Orlando, Florida
2:00 pm	Angulo 41'	Report	Pedro 13'	Stadium: Exploria Stadium
