= Colin Guske =

American soccer player (born 2007)

Personal information
- Date of birth: January 29, 2007 (age 19)
- Place of birth: St. Johns, Florida, U.S.
- Height: 6 ft 0 in (1.83 m)
- Position: Defensive midfielder

Team information
- Current team: Real Salt Lake (on loan from Orlando City)
- Number: 25

Youth career
- –2021: Jacksonville FC
- 2021–2025: Orlando City

Senior career*
Years	Team	Apps	(Gls)
2024	Orlando City B	24	(1)
2024	→ Orlando City (loan)	0	(0)
2024–	Orlando City	11	(0)
2025–2026	→ Orlando City B (loan)	21	(0)
2026–	→ Real Salt Lake (loan)	7	(0)

International career^{‡}
2024–2025	United States U18	6	(2)
2024–	United States U19	2	(0)
2026–	United States U20	6	(0)
- * Club domestic league appearances and goals as of 03:40, October 25, 2026 (UTC) ‡ National team caps and goals as of 00:56, August 10, 2026 (UTC)

Colin Guske (born January 29, 2007) is an American professional soccer player who plays as a defensive midfielder for Major League Soccer (MLS) club Real Salt Lake, on loan from fellow MLS club Orlando City.

Guske began his development with the Jacksonville FC academy. In 2021, he transferred to the academy of Major League Soccer franchise Orlando City. In March 2024, Guske made his professional debut for the reserve side, Orlando City B, in MLS Next Pro, and a month later signed a professional contract. Ahead of the 2025 season, Guske signed a homegrown contract with Orlando City and became the team's 16th homegrown signing.

== Early career ==
Guske was born in St. Johns, Florida. In 2019, Guske was training with the academy of Jacksonville FC, but in 2021, Guske moved to the academy of Orlando City and played for the U15 and U17 age groups until 2023. While training with Orlando City, he would make a two-hour drive from Jacksonville with his parents to the academy every day. Guske also participated in the 2022 U-15 Generation Adidas Cup and 2022 and 2023 U-17 Generation Adidas Cups with Orlando City.

Guske participated in the 2025 U-18 Generation Adidas Cup and in the final he provided the game-winning assist to Gustavo Caraballo in extra time as Orlando City won their first ever Generation Adidas Cup.

== Club career ==
=== Orlando City B ===
On March 15, 2024, Guske was announced as part of Orlando City B's roster for the 2024 MLS Next Pro season. A day later, Guske scored the winning goal of Orlando City B's opener at Atlanta United 2 in a 3–2 win. On April 24, Guske was signed to a one-year MLS Next Pro contract through 2024. On July 2, Guske was one of two Orlando City B players to be selected for the 2024 MLS NEXT All-Star Game. At the conclusion of the season, Guske clocked the most minutes for any player born in 2007 in the league.

=== Orlando City ===
On August 4, 2024, Guske was signed to a short-term agreement to Orlando City for the club's Leagues Cup match against Atlético San Luis on the same day. Guske made the bench, but did not make an appearance. On December 16, Guske was signed to a homegrown contract through 2027, with a club option for 2028, making him the 16th homegrown player signed by the club.

Guske made his unofficial debut on January 25, 2025 in a Florida Cup friendly match against Atlético Mineiro when he came on as an 80th-minute substitute for César Araújo. The match would end scoreless and be decided 6–5 in penalties in favor of Orlando City. On April 5, Guske made his debut when he came on as a 90th-minute substitute for Martín Ojeda in a scoreless draw with Philadelphia Union. Guske became the youngest Orlando City player to make a playoffs appearance on October 22 when he came on as a 75th-minute substitute for César Araújo in a 3–1 loss to the Chicago Fire. On March 1, 2026, Guske made his first start in a 4–2 Florida Derby loss to Inter Miami. Guske was sent off in the second half after receiving a second yellow card.

Guske was sent on loan to fellow MLS club Real Salt Lake on a season-long loan on August 21, 2026, in exchange for $50,000 in general allocation money. As part of the deal, Real Salt Lake gained the option to purchase Guske at the end of the loan. Guske learned of Real Salt Lake's interest in him while in the middle of the 2026 CONCACAF U-20 Championship, and Guske said he agreed to the move due to Real Salt Lake's emphasis on developing young players. Guske made his debut for Real Salt Lake on September 1 as a substitute in a 1–0 loss to the Colorado Rapids. Before being substituted on, Real Salt Lake head coach Pablo Mastroeni instructed Guske to "Go have fun, make a difference, and enjoy it". After Guske received a yellow card for a tactical foul in the midfield, Mastroeni praised Guske, saying that he made a "great tactical foul" and that it "speaks to his level of understanding".

== International career ==
On September 6, 2024, it was announced that Guske had been called up by Michael Nsien to the United States U18 training camp in Niigata, Japan and for friendlies against a local Niigata select team, Japan, and Peru. On September 14, Guske made his debut when he came on as a 75th-minute substitute for Jonathan Shore in a 4–3 loss to Japan. In the following match two days later against Peru, Guske started and played the full match and scored his first international goal in a 2–0 win.

On October 3, 2024, it was publicized that Guske had been called up by Nsien to the United States U19 training camp in Oliva, Spain and for friendlies against Sweden and Japan. Guske made his debut against Sweden on October 11 when he came on as an 81st-minute substitute for Paulo Rudisill in a 4–1 victory.

On March 16, 2025, Guske received another call up to the United States U18 squad, this time by Marlon LeBlanc, for training camp in Marbella, Spain from March 17 to 25 and friendlies against Morocco and Norway. Guske scored his second international goal in a 2–2 draw with Morocco. On May 28, Guske was once again called up to the squad, this time to compete in the UEFA Friendship Cup in Nyon, Switzerland from May 30–June 11, in a group with France, Argentina, and Australia. The United States advanced to the final of the UEFA Friendship Cup by going undefeated and winning their group and faced Portugal. The United States and Portugal drew 1–1 and, despite Guske missing the first penalty of the subsequent shoot-out, the United States won 3–2.

On August 29, 2025, Guske was called up to the U19 squad for a training camp at McCurry Park in Fayetteville, Georgia from September 1 to 8. On October 3, Guske received a call up for training camp between October 6 and 15 in San Pedro del Pinatar, Spain and friendly matches against Northern Ireland and Belgium. On November 7, Guske was again selected for the U19 squad, this time for the UEFA U-19 Youth Tournament from November 10 to 18 in which they would face Germany, Wales, and Japan.

On March 19, 2026, Guske received his first call-up of the year to the U19 squad, this time for training camp in Alicante, Spain, in preparation for the 2026 CONCACAF U-20 Championship. Nine days after the call-up, the United States are scheduled to face Wales in a friendly. On May 28, Guske was again called up to the U19 squad, this time for training at the Arthur M. Blank US Soccer National Training Center and for a friendly against Japan on June 9. On July 16, Guske was announced to have made the final squad for the CONCACAF U-20 Championship. In the first match of the tournament, which was against Haiti, Guske provided an assist to Dino Klapija to help the United States win 3–0. The United States advanced to the final of the tournament, but lost 2–0 to Mexico on August 9.

== Personal life ==
Guske has two older brothers, Owen and Liam, who also were developed by the Orlando City Academy, as well as a younger sister. After the academy, Owen played collegiate soccer for the UCF Knights and Jacksonville Dolphins, while Liam played collegiate soccer with the Seton Hall Pirates. Guske is also a fan of Chelsea alongside his siblings, except for Liam who supports Manchester United.

== Career statistics ==
As of match played October 24, 2026

Appearances and goals by club, season, and competition
Club	Season	League			U.S. Open Cup		Continental		Playoffs (Note: Includes MLS Next Pro playoffs and MLS Cup playoffs)		Other		Total	
Club	Season	Division	Apps	Goals	Apps	Goals	Apps	Goals	Apps	Goals	Apps	Goals	Apps	Goals
Orlando City B	2024	MLS Next Pro	24	1	—		—		1	0	—		25	1
Orlando City (loan)	2025	Major League Soccer	—		—		—		—		0	0	0	0
Orlando City	2025	Major League Soccer	5	0	1	0	—		1	0	0	0	7	0
Orlando City	2026	Major League Soccer	6	0	2	0	—		—		1 (Note: Appearances in Leagues Cup)	0	9	0
Orlando City	Orlando City total		11	0	3	0	0	0	1	0	1	0	16	0
Orlando City B (loan)	2025	MLS Next Pro	18	0	—		—		—		—		18	0
Orlando City B (loan)	2026	MLS Next Pro	3	0	—		—		—		—		3	0
Orlando City B (loan)	Total		21	0	0	0	0	0	0	0	0	0	21	0
Real Salt Lake (loan)	2026	Major League Soccer	7	0	—		—		—		0	0	7	0
Career total			63	1	3	0	0	0	2	0	1	0	69	1

== Honors ==
United States U20

- CONCACAF U-20 Championship: 2026 (runners-up)

Individual

- MLS Next All Star: 2024
