= Joran Gerbet =

French footballer (born 2001)

- Gerbet with Orlando City in 2026

Personal information
- Date of birth: 30 June 2001 (age 25)
- Place of birth: Saint-Laurent-du-Pape, France
- Height: 1.80 m (5 ft 11 in)
- Position: Defensive midfielder

Team information
- Current team: Orlando City
- Number: 35

Youth career
- FC Eyrieux Embroye
- Rhône Crussol Foot 07
- Olympique de Valence
- 2018–2021: AJ Auxerre

College career
Years	Team	Apps	(Gls)
2021–2022	Oregon State Beavers	36	(2)
2023–2024	Clemson Tigers	42	(10)

Senior career*
Years	Team	Apps	(Gls)
2025–	Orlando City	31	(0)
- * Club domestic league appearances and goals as of 23:52, 7 November 2026 (UTC)

Joran Gerbet (born 30 June 2001) is a French professional footballer who plays as a defensive midfielder for Major League Soccer club Orlando City.

Gerbet spent his last three years of youth football in the academy of AJ Auxerre before moving to the United States to attend university and join the Oregon State Beavers, whom he spent two seasons with. Gerbet then transferred schools and joined the Clemson Tigers, with whom he won the 2023 ACC men's soccer tournament. Gerbet was picked 27th overall in the 2025 MLS SuperDraft by Orlando City, and the team opted to sign him to his first professional contract in mid-February 2025.

== Early career ==
Gerbet was born in Saint-Laurent-du-Pape in the Ardèche department of France and joined the AJ Auxerre academy after playing in the youth ranks of FC Eyrieux Embroye, Rhône Crussol Foot 07, and Olympique de Valence, but later moved to the United States and attended Oregon State University where he joined the school's soccer team.

=== Oregon State Beavers ===
On 27 August 2021, Gerbet made his college debut with the Oregon State Beavers in a 3–0 win at the Denver Pioneers and played the full match. On 3 October, Gerbet provided his first goal contribution when he provided an assist to Adrian Molina-Diaz's opening goal of a 2–0 victory at the San Diego State Aztecs. Gerbet scored his first collegiate goal, the second of a 3–2 win over the Washington Huskies on 22 October. By the end of Gerbet's first season with the Oregon State Beavers he contributed two goals and two assists across 20 games and was given the Pac-12 Conference Men's Soccer Freshman of the Year award.

In Gerbet's second and final season with the Oregon State Beavers he tallied a further two assists across 16 appearances and was given the Pac-12 Conference Men's Soccer Player of the Year award.

=== Clemson Tigers ===
Gerbet transferred to Clemson University and joined the Clemson Tigers. On 1 September 2023, Gerbet scored his first collegiate goal on his second appearance for the university in a 2–0 win over the South Carolina Gamecocks. Gerbet and the Clemson Tigers made it to the 2023 ACC men's soccer tournament final against the North Carolina Tar Heels. The game ended 1–1 with Gerbet supplying the game-tying assist to Ousmane Sylla. In the subsequent penalty shootout, which the Tigers won 5–3, Gerbet successfully converted his penalty. In Gerbet's debut season he provided three goals and three assists.

In Gerbet's senior year he provided his first double goal contribution in a 3–2 loss to Stanford Cardinal on 6 September 2024. On 4 October, Gerbet scored his first brace in a 3–2 win over the North Carolina Tar Heels and on 25 October, Gerbet provided a hat-trick of assists in a 6–1 rout of Syracuse Orange.

By the end of the season, Gerbet had contributed seven goals and eight assists, a career high in both metrics and he was awarded as the Atlantic Coast Conference Men's Soccer Player of the Year. Gerbet was also selected to the 2024 NCAA Division I men's soccer First-Team All-America team by the United Soccer Coaches. On 10 December, it was announced that Gerbet was invited to attend the 2024 adidas MLS College Showcase in San Diego, California from 11 to 14 December alongside 44 other players.

== Club career ==
On 20 December 2024, Gerbet was selected as pick number 27 by Major League Soccer club Orlando City in the 2025 MLS SuperDraft alongside fellow Clemson alumni Titus Sandy Jr in the second round. On 25 January 2025, Gerbet made his unofficial debut with Orlando City in a Florida Cup friendly match against Brazilian club Atlético Minero after he came on as a substitute for Rafael Santos in the second half. The game ended scoreless, but in the subsequent penalty-kick shootout Gerbet converted the game-winning penalty, ending the shootout 6–5 in favor of the Lions.

On 17 February, the club signed Gerbet to a one-year contract with club options for 2026, 2027, and 2028. Gerbet made his official debut when he came on as a 71st-minute substitute for Eduard Atuesta in the opening match of the season five days later against Philadelphia Union, which ended in a 4–2 loss.

On 10 May, Gerbet made his first professional goal contribution when he provided an assist to Martín Ojeda's second goal in his hat-trick performance in a 3–3 draw with the New England Revolution. On 18 May, during a match against rivals Inter Miami, Gerbet was praised for his "tremendous job" marking Lionel Messi as the Lions won 3–0. For his performance, he was named to the bench of the Team of the Matchday a day later.

Orlando City head coach Óscar Pareja praised Gerbet for quality of play and development during his debut season, saying that controlling the midfield is very difficult, but that Gerbet "has the talent and the qualities to [do it]." Gerbet described the hardest part of transitioning to professional play from college soccer as the mental side of the game.

On 17 October, Orlando City announced that Gerbet had undergone a successful surgery to repair his left anterior cruciate ligament after injuring it on 4 October against the Columbus Crew. Following the end of the season, Orlando City opted to exercise his contract option for 2026. Gerbet made his return from injury on 8 August 2026 as a second-half substitute in a 2–1 loss to León in the Leagues Cup.

== Career statistics ==
As of match played 19 November 2026

Appearances and goals by club, season and competition
Club	Season	League			U.S. Open Cup		Playoffs		Other		Total	
Club	Season	Division	Apps	Goals	Apps	Goals	Apps	Goals	Apps	Goals	Apps	Goals
Orlando City	2025	Major League Soccer	20	0	1	0	0	0	2 (Note: Appearances in Leagues Cup)	0	23	0
Orlando City	2026	Major League Soccer	11	0	1	0	1	0	2	0	15	0
Career total			31	0	2	0	1	0	4	0	38	0

== Honours ==
Clemson Tigers

- ACC men's soccer tournament: 2023

Individual

- Pac-12 Conference Men's Soccer Freshman of the Year: 2021
- Pac-12 Conference Men's Soccer Player of the Year: 2022
- Third Team All-ACC: 2023
- Atlantic Coast Conference Men's Soccer Player of the Year: 2024
- Atlantic Coast Conference Men's Soccer Midfielder of the Year: 2024
- First Team All-ACC: 2024
- United Soccer Coaches First-Team All-America: 2024
- United Soccer Coaches First Team All-South Region: 2024
