= Nicolás Rodríguez (footballer, born 2004) =

Colombian footballer (born 2004)

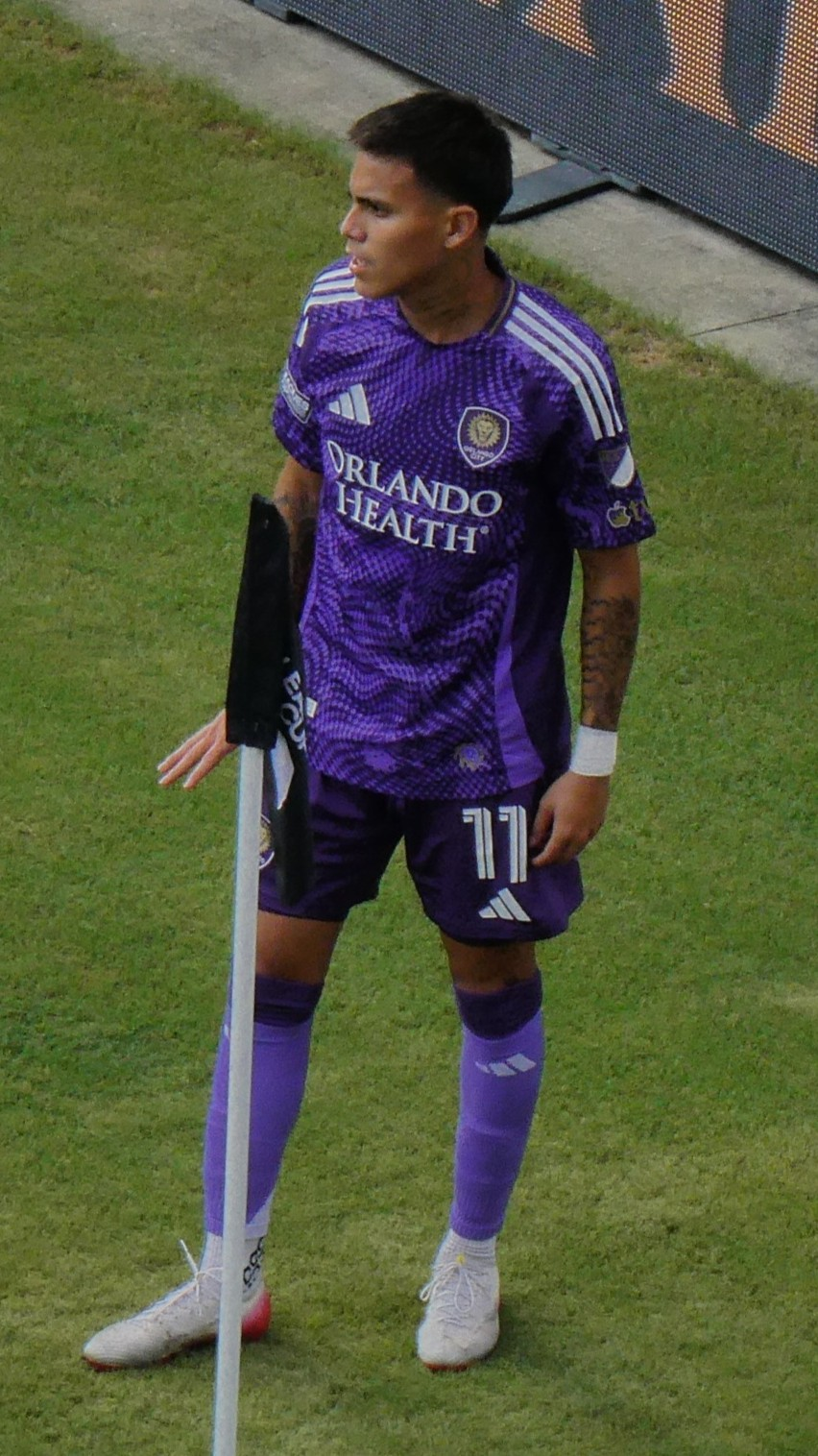
- Rodríguez with Orlando City in 2025

Personal information
- Full name: Nicolás Santiago Rodríguez Calderón
- Date of birth: 25 April 2004 (age 22)
- Place of birth: San José del Guaviare, Colombia
- Height: 1.72 m (5 ft 8 in)
- Position: Winger

Team information
- Current team: Atlético Nacional (on loan from Orlando City)
- Number: 13

Youth career
- 2021–2022: Fortaleza CEIF

Senior career*
Years	Team	Apps	(Gls)
2021–2025	Fortaleza CEIF	86	(15)
2025–	Orlando City	12	(1)
2025	→ Orlando City B (loan)	2	(0)
2026–	→ Atlético Nacional (loan)	27	(0)
- * Club domestic league appearances and goals as of 04:00, 10 November 2026 (UTC)

Nicolás Santiago Rodríguez Calderón (born 25 April 2004) is a Colombian professional footballer who plays as a winger for Categoría Primera A club Atlético Nacional, on loan from Major League Soccer club Orlando City.

== Early life ==
Born in San José del Guaviare, Rodríguez moved to Bogotá in 2021 to join Fortaleza CEIF's youth sides.

== Club career ==
=== Fortaleza CEIF ===
Rodríguez made his first team debut on 12 October 2021, coming on in the 81st-minute for Carlos Lucumí in a 0–0 Categoría Primera B home draw against Boyacá Chicó. After also featuring rarely in the 2022 season, Rodríguez became an undisputed starter in the 2023 campaign, scoring his first senior goal on 9 April of that year, in a 1–0 away win over Cortuluá. He scored a further seven goals as the club achieved promotion to the top tier.

Rodríguez remained a starter in 2024, becoming a key unit for Fortaleza. Rodríguez scored his first goal in the Colombian top tier on 11 February when he scored the second goal of a 2–0 win over Atlético Junior. On 9 April, Rodríguez scored his first and only non-league goal for the club when he netted the deciding goal of a 2–1 victory over Once Caldas in the first leg on their tie in the second stage of the 2024 Copa Colombia.

=== Orlando City ===
On 17 January 2025, Rodríguez was signed by Major League Soccer club Orlando City as a U22 initiative player through 2027 with a club option for 2028. On the opening game of the season, Rodríguez made his debut for the club when he came on as an 80th-minute substitute for Iván Angulo in a 2–4 loss to Philadelphia Union. On 13 July, Rodríguez started a game with Orlando City B, the reserve affiliate of Orlando City, playing the first half of the match as Orlando City B defeated Carolina Core 3–1. On 16 August, Rodríguez scored his first goal for the team to close out a 3–1 home win over Sporting Kansas City.

==== Loan to Atlético Nacional ====
On 8 January 2026, Rodríguez returned to Colombia, and signed on loan to Liga DIMAYOR club Atlético Nacional through the 2026 season with an option to buy. Rodríguez made his debut for the club on 17 January when he came on as a 66th-minute substitute for Andrés Sarmiento in a 4–0 win against Boyacá Chicó. On 4 March, Rodríguez scored his first goal for the club in a 3–1 loss to Millonarios in the Copa Sudamericana. Following Rodríguez's suspension on 24 March by Atlético Nacional for an alleged sexual assault nine days earlier, Atlético Nacional manager Diego Arias confirmed on 23 April that Rodríguez had begun training with the squad again. On 1 May, Rodríguez made his first appearance since the allegations as a substitute in a 1–0 loss to Once Caldas.

== Personal life ==
On 24 March 2026, Rodríguez was suspended by Atlético Nacional after a 19-year-old woman accused him and at least one other man of sexually assaulting her in Rionegro after she became intoxicated at a nightclub on 15 March. In the criminal complaint filed four days after the alleged incident, the woman alleges that she was contacted by the men through Instagram, and after she became too intoxicated to defend herself at the nightclub, she was brought to an apartment in Rionegro and sexually assaulted by Rodríguez and the other men. After the alleged assault, she sought treatment at a medical center. The woman's lawyers made public alleged text messages between her and Rodríguez in which Rodríguez allegedly asked her to have an intimate encounter with him and another man at the same time before the alleged rape, to which she refused. Her lawyer also shared text messages allegedly showing another player reaching out to her to try to prevent the situation between her and Rodríguez from escalating. Rodríguez's lawyer, Luis Felipe Henríquez del Castillo, said that he and Rodríguez "emphatically reject the complaint" and that "the accusations do not conform to the reality of what happened".

== Career statistics ==
As of 2 November 2026

Club	Season	League			National cup (Note: Includes Copa Colombia and U.S. Open Cup)		Continental		Other		Total	
Club	Season	Division	Apps	Goals	Apps	Goals	Apps	Goals	Apps	Goals	Apps	Goals
Fortaleza CEIF	2021	Categoría Primera B	3	0	0	0	—		—		3	0
Fortaleza CEIF	2022	Categoría Primera B	2	0	0	0	—		—		2	0
Fortaleza CEIF	2023	Categoría Primera B	44	8	2	0	—		—		46	8
Fortaleza CEIF	2024	Categoría Primera A	37	7	5	1	—		—		42	8
Fortaleza CEIF	Total		86	15	7	1	—		—		93	16
Orlando City	2025	Major League Soccer	12	1	1	0	—		4 (Note: Appearances in Leagues Cup)	0	17	1
Orlando City B (loan)	2025	MLS Next Pro	2	0	—		—		—		2	0
Atlético Nacional (loan)	2026	Categoría Primera A	27	0	1	1	1 (Note: Appearance in Copa Sudamericana)	1	—		29	2
Career total			127	17	9	1	1	1	4	0	141	19
