= Pac-12 Conference Men's Soccer Freshman of the Year =

The Pac-12 Conference Men's Soccer Freshman of the Year award is a currently dormant annual award given to the top freshman soccer player in the Pac-12 Conference. The award was first given out in 2000.

After the conference's 2024 collapse, it suspended men's soccer competition. Pac-12 men's soccer will resume in 2026, with legacy full member Oregon State, plus incoming full members Gonzaga and San Diego State, joined by four new affiliates from the Big West Conference.

== Key ==
†	Co-Players of the Year

== Winners ==
=== Freshman of the Year (2000–present) ===
Season	Player	School	Position	Reference
2000	Alex Yi	UCLA	Defender	
2001	C. J. Klaas	Washington	Defender	
2002	Joe Zaher	Oregon State	Midfielder	
2003	Chad Barrett; Robbie Findley	UCLA; Oregon State	Forward; Forward	
2004	Ely Allen	Washington	Midfielder	
2005	Sal Zizzo	UCLA	Midfielder	
2006	Nick Cardenas	San Diego	Defender	
2007	Bobby Warshaw	Stanford	Midfielder	
2008	Danny Mwanga	Oregon State	Forward	
2009	Amobi Okugo	UCLA	Defender	
2010	Kelyn Rowe	UCLA	Midfielder	
2011	Seth Casiple	California	Midfielder	
2012	Aaron Kovar	Stanford	Midfielder	
2013	Cristian Roldan	Washington	Midfielder	
2014	Timmy Mueller	Oregon State	Forward	
2015	José Hernández	UCLA	Midfielder	
2016	Handwalla Bwana	Washington	Forward	
2017	Blake Bodily	Washington	Midfielder	
2018	Sofiane Djeffal	Oregon State	Midfielder	
2019	Ousseni Bouda	Stanford	Midfielder	
2020	Mark Fisher	Stanford	Midfielder	
2021	Joran Gerbet	Oregon State	Midfielder	
2022	CJ Fodrey	San Diego State	Forward	

=== Newcomer of the Year (2026–present) ===
Season	Player	School	Position	Reference
2026	John Koutelieris	Oregon State	Midfielder	
2026	Justin Ojo	Cal Baptist	Forward	
