= 2025 Orlando City SC season =

Season of an American soccer team

Orlando City SC
2025 season
- Manager: Óscar Pareja
- Stadium: Inter&Co Stadium
- MLS: Conference: 9th Overall: 14th
- MLS Cup Playoffs: Wild card
- U.S. Open Cup: Round of 16
- Leagues Cup: Fourth place
- Top goalscorer: League: Martín Ojeda (16); All: Martín Ojeda (20)
- Average home league attendance: 20,573
Home colors	Away colors

The 2025 Orlando City SC season was the club's 15th season of existence in Orlando and 11th season as a Major League Soccer franchise, the top-flight league in the United States soccer league system. Orlando played in two other competitions: the U.S. Open Cup and Leagues Cup.

== Roster ==
Last updated on September 8, 2025

No.	Nationality	Name	Position(s)	Date of birth (age)	Previous club	Notes
Goalkeepers
1	(Peru)	Pedro Gallese	GK	February 23, 1990 (age 36)	(Mexico) Veracruz	INT
12	(Venezuela)	Javier Otero	GK	November 18, 2002 (age 23)	(United States) Orlando City B	HGP
99	(United States)	Carlos Mercado	GK	September 27, 1999 (age 26)	(United States) Orlando City B	–
Defenders
4	(Slovenia)	David Brekalo	CB	December 3, 1998 (age 27)	(Norway) Viking FK	INT
6	(Sweden)	Robin Jansson	CB	November 15, 1991 (age 34)	(Sweden) AIK	–
15	(Argentina)	Rodrigo Schlegel	CB	April 3, 1997 (age 29)	(Argentina) Racing Club	INT
17	(Iceland)	Dagur Dan Þórhallsson	RB	May 2, 2000 (age 26)	(Iceland) Breiðablik	INT
21	(Spain)	Adrián Marín	LB	January 9, 1997 (age 29)	(Portugal) Braga	INT
24	(United States)	Kyle Smith	RB	January 9, 1992 (age 34)	(United States) Louisville City	–
29	(United States)	Tahir Reid-Brown	RB	July 2, 2006 (age 20)	(United States) Orlando City B	HGP
30	(United States)	Alex Freeman	RB	August 9, 2004 (age 22)	(United States) Orlando City Academy	HGP
68	(United States)	Thomas Williams	CB	August 15, 2004 (age 22)	(United States) Orlando City B	HGP
96	(United States)	Zakaria Taifi	RB	October 1, 2005 (age 20)	(United States) Orlando City B	HGP
Midfielders
5	(Uruguay)	César Araújo	CM	April 2, 2001 (age 25)	(Uruguay) Montevideo Wanderers	U22, INT
10	(Argentina)	Martín Ojeda	AM	November 27, 1998 (age 27)	(Argentina) Godoy Cruz	DP, INT
16	(Peru)	Wilder Cartagena	DM	September 23, 1994 (age 32)	(United Arab Emirates) Kalba FC	INT, SEI
20	(Colombia)	Eduard Atuesta	DM	June 18, 1997 (age 29)	(Brazil) Palmeiras	INT
23	(Ghana)	Shak Mohammed	AM	August 27, 2003 (age 23)	(United States) Duke Blue Devils	GA
25	(United States)	Colin Guske	DM	January 29, 2007 (age 19)	(United States) Orlando City B	HGP
35	(France)	Joran Gerbet	DM	June 30, 2001 (age 25)	(United States) Clemson Tigers	–
65	(Venezuela)	Gustavo Caraballo	AM	August 29, 2008 (age 18)	(United States) Orlando City B	HGP
95	(Chile)	Favian Loyola	AM	May 18, 2005 (age 21)	(United States) Orlando City B	HGP
Forwards
9	(Colombia)	Luis Muriel	CF	April 16, 1991 (age 35)	(Italy) Atalanta	DP
11	(Colombia)	Nicolás Rodríguez	RW	April 25, 2004 (age 22)	(Colombia) Fortaleza	U22, INT
13	(United States)	Duncan McGuire	ST	February 5, 2001 (age 25)	(United States) Creighton Bluejays	–
14	(Trinidad and Tobago)	Tyrese Spicer	LW	December 4, 2000 (age 25)	(Canada) Toronto FC	–
34	(Japan)	Yutaro Tsukada	LW	July 28, 2001 (age 25)	(United States) Orlando City B	SEI
77	(Colombia)	Iván Angulo	LW	March 22, 1999 (age 27)	(Brazil) Palmeiras	INT
87	(Croatia)	Marco Pašalić	RW	September 14, 2000 (age 26)	(Croatia) HNK Rijeka	DP, INT

== Staff ==
Executive
Majority owner and chairman	(United States) Mark Wilf
Majority owner and vice-chair	(United States) Zygi Wilf
Majority owner and vice-chair	(United States) Leonard Wilf
President of business operations	(United States) Jarrod Dillon
General manager	(Brazil) Luiz Muzzi
Technical director	(Brazil) Ricardo Moreira
Coaching staff
Head coach	(Colombia) Óscar Pareja
First assistant coach	(Mexico) Diego Torres Ortiz
Second assistant coach	(Argentina) Martín Perelman
Strength and conditioning coach	(Argentina) Fabian Bazán
Goalkeeping coach	(Venezuela) César Baena

== Competitions ==
=== Friendlies ===
Orlando City opened preseason camp on January 13.

January 25 Florida Cup	Orlando City SC	0–0 (6–5 p)	Atlético Mineiro	Orlando, Florida
3:00 pm		Report		Stadium: Inter&Co Stadium
	Penalties
	Smith (penalty scored); Enrique (penalty scored); Brekalo (penalty scored); Angulo (penalty missed); Gallese (penalty scored); Freeman (penalty scored); Gerbet (penalty scored)		(penalty scored) Igor Gomes; (penalty scored) Palacios; (penalty scored) Rubens; (penalty missed) Deyverson; (penalty scored) Everson; (penalty scored) Rômulo; (penalty missed) Fuchs

January 28 Friendly	Orlando City SC	0–0	Forge FC	Cancún, Mexico
		Report
Note: Closed-door scrimmage

February 5 Friendly	Orlando City SC	–	Atlanta United FC
Note: Closed-door scrimmage. No scoreline announced.

February 8 Friendly	Orlando City SC	1–2 (a.e.t.)	CF Montréal	Orlando, Florida
	Lodeiro 120'	Report	Yankov 97'; Ibrahim 110'	Stadium: Inter&Co Stadium
Note: Season ticket member exclusive match

February 11 Friendly	Orlando City SC	0–4	Rhode Island FC	Orlando, Florida
2:00 pm		Report

February 14 Friendly	Orlando City SC	2–2	Inter Miami CF	Tampa, Florida
7:30 pm	Ojeda 15'; Schlegel (yellow card) 17'; Araújo (yellow card) 40'; Enrique 54'	Report	Allende 22'; Busquets (yellow card) 53'; Cremaschi (yellow card) 82'; Picault 90+3'	Stadium: Raymond James Stadium; Referee: Filip Dujic

=== Major League Soccer ===
MLS is Back opening weekend is scheduled for February 22–23. Regular season play paused from June 15 to 24 for the 2025 FIFA Club World Cup and the 2025 CONCACAF Gold Cup.

=== Results summary ===
Overall								Home						Away					
Pld	W	D	L	GF	GA	GD	Pts	W	D	L	GF	GA	GD	W	D	L	GF	GA	GD
34	14	11	9	63	51	+12	53	8	5	5	37	27	+10	6	6	4	26	24	+2

Last updated: October 18, 2025.
Source: Match reports

Round	1	2	3	4	5	6	7	8	9	10	11	12	13	14	15	16	17	18	19	20	21	22	23	24	25	26	27	28	29	30	31	32	33	34
Stadium	H	H	A	A	H	A	A	H	A	H	A	H	H	A	H	A	H	A	A	H	A	H	H	A	A	H	H	A	H	H	A	H	H	A
Result	L	W	L	D	W	W	D	D	D	W	D	D	W	W	W	L	L	W	W	L	D	D	L	W	W	W	W	L	D	W	D	D	L	L
Position (Note: ORL's position at the end of the matchweek, not their match.)	14	6	12	11	9	7	6	7	7	7	7	8	6	4	4	5	7	5	5	5	5	6	6	6	6	4	4	5	6	6	7	7	7	9

Updated to match(es) played on October 18, 2025. Source: Match reports
A = Away; H = Home; W = Win; D = Draw; L = Loss

==== Results ====
February 22 1	Orlando City SC	2–4	Philadelphia Union	Orlando, Florida
7:30 pm	Pašalić 8', 79'; Araújo (yellow card) 31'	Report	Baribo 24', 64'; Uhre (yellow card) 33', (goal) 51'; Gazdag 48'; Lukić (yellow card) 58'	Stadium: Inter&Co Stadium; Attendance: 22,689; Referee: Rubiel Vazquez

March 1 2	Orlando City SC	4–2	Toronto FC	Orlando, Florida
7:30 pm	Araújo 33'; Freeman 35'; Santos (yellow card) 57'; Ojeda 63'; Atuesta (yellow card) 73'; Þórhallsson 81'	Report	Rosted 72'; Flores 86'	Stadium: Inter&Co Stadium; Attendance: 18,582; Referee: Alexis Da Silva

March 8 3	New York City FC	2–1	Orlando City SC	New York, New York
7:30 pm	Martínez 59'; Moralez (yellow card) 66'; Wolf 71'; O'Toole (yellow card) 77' (yellow-red card) 86'	Report	Angulo (yellow card) 61'; Muriel 69'; Atuesta (yellow card) 82'	Stadium: Yankee Stadium; Attendance: 25,846; Referee: Pierre-Luc Lauziere

March 15 4	New York Red Bulls	2–2	Orlando City SC	Harrison, New Jersey
2:30 pm	Choupo-Moting 29' (pen.); Gjengaar 47'; Stroud (yellow card) 68'; Nealis (yellow card) 74'; Ngoma (yellow card) 90+1'	Report	Ojeda 18'; Pašalić 39'; Jansson (yellow card) 82'	Stadium: Sports Illustrated Stadium; Attendance: 16,713; Referee: Armando Villarreal

March 22 5	Orlando City SC	4–1	D.C. United	Orlando, Florida
7:30 pm	Muriel 21'; Ojeda 44'; Freeman 50'; Pašalić 56'; Otero (yellow card) 67'; Angulo (yellow card) 72'	Report	MacNaughton 90+1'	Stadium: Inter&Co Stadium; Attendance: 19,817; Referee: Tori Penso

March 29 6	LA Galaxy	1–2	Orlando City SC	Carson, California
10:30 pm	Ramírez 14'; Yamane (yellow card) 28'; Pec (yellow card) 62'; Parente (yellow card) 89'	Report	Araújo (yellow card) 52'; Atuesta (yellow card) 60'; Ojeda 76' (pen.); Muriel 90'; Gallese (yellow card) 90+6'	Stadium: Dignity Health Sports Park; Attendance: 21,722; Referee: Jon Freemon

April 5 7	Philadelphia Union	0–0	Orlando City SC	Chester, Pennsylvania
7:30 pm	Damiani (yellow card) 65'; Harriel (yellow card) 74'; Sullivan (yellow card) 76'; Vassilev (yellow card) 90+3'	Report	Jansson (yellow card) 35'; Muriel (yellow card) 52'; Gerbet (yellow card) 58'; Þórhallsson (yellow card) 75'; Gallese (yellow card) 90+4'	Stadium: Subaru Park; Attendance: 18,127; Referee: Ismir Pekmic

April 12 8	Orlando City SC	0–0	New York Red Bulls	Orlando, Florida
4:30 pm	Pašalić (yellow card) 19'; Schlegel (yellow card) 31' (yellow-red card) 56'	Report	Ngoma (yellow card) 47'; Stroud (yellow card) 64'; Valencia (yellow card) 89'	Stadium: Inter&Co Stadium; Attendance: 21,418; Referee: Chris Penso

April 19 9	CF Montréal	0–0	Orlando City SC	Montreal, Quebec
7:30 pm	Campbell (yellow card) 38'; Clark (yellow card) 90'	Report	Smith (yellow card) 3'; Santos (yellow card) 60' (yellow-red card) 76'	Stadium: Saputo Stadium; Attendance: 16,038; Referee: Fotis Bazakos

April 26 10	Orlando City SC	3–0	Atlanta United FC	Orlando, Florida
7:00 pm	Muriel 42' (pen.); Freeman 51'; Pašalić 67'; Schlegel (yellow card) 90+6'	Report	Slisz (yellow card) 79'; Fortune (yellow card) 90+1'	Stadium: Inter&Co Stadium; Attendance: 20,184; Referee: Marcos de Oliveira

May 3 11	Chicago Fire FC	0–0	Orlando City SC	Chicago, Illinois
8:30 pm	Oregel (yellow card) 27'; Brady (red card) 36'; Gutiérrez (yellow card) 45'; Gutman (yellow card) 70'	Report	Þórhallsson (yellow card) 90'	Stadium: Soldier Field; Attendance: 17,876; Referee: Victor Rivas

May 10 12	Orlando City SC	3–3	New England Revolution	Orlando, Florida
7:30 pm	Ojeda 24', 33', 55' (pen.); Brekalo (yellow card) 76'; Araújo (yellow card) 77'; Gallese (yellow card) 80'; Þórhallsson (yellow card) 90+11'	Report	Yusuf 38'; Polster 44'; Gil 85' (pen.); Ivačič (yellow card) 90+1'	Stadium: Inter&Co Stadium; Attendance: 18,805; Referee: Rubiel Vazquez

May 14 13	Orlando City SC	3–1	Charlotte FC	Orlando, Florida
7:30 pm	Muriel 8'; Ojeda 24'; Araújo (yellow card) 58'; Gerbet (yellow card) 80'; Enrique 82'	Report	Zaha (yellow card) 27', (goal) 34'	Stadium: Inter&Co Stadium; Attendance: 17,007; Referee: Sergii Boiko

May 18 14	Inter Miami CF	0–3	Orlando City SC	Fort Lauderdale, Florida
7:00 pm	Allen (yellow card) 11'; Falcón (yellow card) 55'; Suárez (yellow card) 73'; Messi (yellow card) 75'	Report	Muriel 43'; Pašalić 53'; Þórhallsson 90+4'	Stadium: Chase Stadium; Attendance: 20,859; Referee: Guido Gonzales Jr.

May 24 15	Orlando City SC	1–0	Portland Timbers	Orlando, Florida
7:30 pm	McGuire 39'; Angulo (yellow card) 74'; Schlegel (yellow card) 90+5'	Report	Antony (yellow card) 66'; Župarić (yellow card) 90+3'	Stadium: Inter&Co Stadium; Attendance: 21,256; Referee: Jair Marrufo

May 28 16	Atlanta United FC	3–2	Orlando City SC	Atlanta, Georgia
7:30 pm	Miranchuk 19'; Slisz (yellow card) 63', (goal) 83'; Klich (yellow card) 79'; Fortune (yellow card) 82'; Thiaré 90+5'	Report	Araújo 4', (red card) 77'; Enrique 32'; Atuesta (yellow card) 90+1'; Gallese (yellow card) 90+3'	Stadium: Mercedes-Benz Stadium; Attendance: 39,275; Referee: Filip Dujic

May 31 17	Orlando City SC	1–3	Chicago Fire FC	Orlando, Florida
7:30 pm	Freeman 40'; Jansson (yellow card) 45'; Schlegel (yellow card) 49'	Report	Zinckernagel 5'; Cupps (yellow card) 22'; Pineda (yellow card) 28'; Cuypers 31', 32'	Stadium: Inter&Co Stadium; Attendance: 21,024; Referee: Ricardo Fierro

June 14 18	Colorado Rapids	0–1	Orlando City SC	Commerce City, Colorado
9:30 pm	Cannon (yellow card) 66'; Basset (yellow card) 68'	Report	Ojeda 24'; Schlegel (yellow card) 32'; Smith (yellow card) 84'; Guske (yellow card) 90+2'	Stadium: Dick's Sporting Goods Park; Attendance: 16,473; Referee: Ramy Touchan

June 25 19	St. Louis City SC	2–4	Orlando City SC	St. Louis, Missouri
8:30 pm	Becher 40'; Klauss 45+3'; Reid (yellow card) 67'; Wentzel (yellow card) 90'	Report	Enrique 7', 22'; Pašalić 9', 82'	Stadium: Energizer Park; Attendance: 22,422; Referee: Guido Gonzales Jr.

June 28 20	Orlando City SC	1–2	FC Cincinnati	Orlando, Florida
7:30 pm	Pašalić (yellow card) 45', (goal) 87'; Enrique (yellow card) 54'; Brekalo (yellow card) 90+5'	Report	Flores (yellow card) 43'; Yedlin (yellow card) 45'; Evander 45+4', 74'; Baird (yellow card) 90+4'	Stadium: Inter&Co Stadium; Attendance: 20,061; Referee: Marcos de Oliveira

July 5 21	Charlotte FC	2–2	Orlando City SC	Charlotte, North Carolina
7:30 pm	Biel 40'; Toklomati (yellow card) 49'; Tuiloma 65'; Westwood (yellow card) 68'	Report	Brekalo (yellow card) 17'; Gallese (yellow card) 64'; Enrique 69'; Jansson (yellow card) 75'; Pašalić 80'; Araújo (yellow card) 90+6'	Stadium: Bank of America Stadium; Attendance: 28,734; Referee: Rosendo Mendoza

July 12 22	Orlando City SC	1–1	CF Montréal	Orlando, Florida
7:30 pm	Ojeda 28'; Enrique (yellow card) 48'; Schlegel (yellow card) 53'; Freeman (yellow card) 67'; Brekalo (yellow card) 74'	Report	Waterman (yellow card) 45+4'; Owusu (yellow card) 62', (goal) 83' (pen.); Sealy (yellow card) 90+3'	Stadium: Inter&Co Stadium; Attendance: 20,323; Referee: Ramy Touchan

July 16 23	Orlando City SC	1–2	New York City FC	Orlando, Florida
7:30 pm	Jansson 36'; Araújo (yellow card) 60'	Report	Tanasijević (yellow card) 39'; O'Neill (yellow card) 85'; Smith 87' (o.g.); Martínez 90+1'	Stadium: Inter&Co Stadium; Attendance: 18,521; Referee: Jair Marrufo

July 19 24	New England Revolution	1–2	Orlando City SC	Foxborough, Massachusetts
7:30 pm	Polster (yellow card) 30'; Chancalay 55'; Ceballos (yellow card) 67'	Report	Ojeda 18', 58'; Pašalić (yellow card) 55'; Gallese (yellow card) 66'	Stadium: Gillette Stadium; Attendance: 24,954; Referee: Lukasz Szpala

July 25 25	Columbus Crew	1–3	Orlando City SC	Columbus, Ohio
7:30 pm	Rossi 66' (pen.); Zawadzki (yellow card) 82'	Report	Enrique 76', 79'; Jansson (yellow card) 78'; Ojeda 90+6'	Stadium: Lower.com Field; Attendance: 20,641; Referee: Timothy Ford

August 10 26	Orlando City SC	4–1	Inter Miami CF	Orlando, Florida
8:00 pm	Muriel 2', 50'; Freeman (yellow card) 26'; Araújo (yellow card) 38'; Jansson (yellow card) 40'; Ojeda 58'; Pašalić 88'	Report	Bright 5'; Falcón (yellow card) 34'; Allen (yellow card) 45'	Stadium: Inter&Co Stadium; Attendance: 25,046; Referee: Armando Villarreal

August 16 27	Orlando City SC	3–1	Sporting Kansas City	Orlando, Florida
7:30 pm	Spicer 2'; Enrique 76'; Rodríguez 77'	Report	Joveljić 25'	Stadium: Inter&Co Stadium; Attendance: 20,026; Referee: Ricardo Montero

August 23 28	Nashville SC	5–1	Orlando City SC	Nashville, Tennessee
8:30 pm	Surridge 3', 43'; Mukhtar 17', 40'; Qasem (yellow card) 82'; Palacios 90+4'	Report	Smith (yellow card) 50'; Muriel 76', (red card) 81'; Schlegel (yellow card) 90+1'	Stadium: Geodis Park; Attendance: 28,014; Referee: Timothy Ford

September 13 29	D.C. United	1–1	Orlando City SC	Washington, D.C.
7:30 pm	Servania (yellow card) 24'; Hopkins 33'; Bartlett (yellow card) 45'; MacNaughton (red card) 57'; Antley (yellow card) 82'; Peltola (yellow card) 90+2'	Report	Freeman 53'; Atuesta (yellow card) 64'	Stadium: Audi Field; Attendance: 16,195; Referee: Chris Penso

September 20 30	Orlando City SC	3–2	Nashville SC	Orlando, Florida
7:30 pm	Schlegel (yellow card) 22'; Ojeda 30', 32'; McGuire 90+5'	Report	Mukhtar (yellow card) 28', (goal) 45+1'; Tagseth (yellow card) 45+1'; Shaffelburg 51', (yellow card) 90+3'	Stadium: Inter&Co Stadium; Attendance: 20,516; Referee: Pierre-Luc Lauziere

September 28 31	FC Cincinnati	1–1	Orlando City SC	Cincinnati, Ohio
7:00 pm	Gidi (yellow card) 45+2'; Evander (yellow card) 66'; Denkey 73'	Report	Atuesta (yellow card) 32'; Brekalo (yellow card) 37'; Freeman (yellow card) 54', (goal) 90+6'; Smith (yellow card) 67'; Schlegel (yellow card) 86'	Stadium: TQL Stadium; Attendance: 24,135; Referee: Rosendo Mendoza
Note: Match originally scheduled for September 27.

October 4 32	Orlando City SC	1–1	Columbus Crew	Orlando, Florida
7:30 pm	Pašalić 34'; Freeman (yellow card) 63'; Rodríguez (yellow card) 90+2'	Report	Amundsen (yellow card) 24'; Herrera 32'	Stadium: Inter&Co Stadium; Attendance: 21,006; Referee: Victor Rivas

October 11 33	Orlando City SC	1–2	Vancouver Whitecaps FC	Orlando, Florida
7:30 pm	Þórhallsson 24'; Schlegel (yellow card) 48'; Angulo (yellow card) 77'; Smith (yellow card) 90+9'	Report	Pierre 81'; Müller 90+7'	Stadium: Inter&Co Stadium; Attendance: 23,465; Referee: Serhiy Boyko
Note: This match was originally scheduled for August 30, but was rescheduled due to Orlando City SC's participation in the semifinals of the 2025 Leagues Cup.

October 18 34	Toronto FC	4–2	Orlando City SC	Toronto, Ontario
6:00 pm	Osorio 7'; Mihailovic 34', 48'; Etienne Jr. (yellow card) 46'; Corbeneau (yellow card) 49'; Laryea (yellow card) 56'; Kerr 61'; Henry (yellow card) 90'	Report	Marín (yellow card) 32'; Brekalo 54'; McGuire 90+2', (yellow card) 90+5'	Stadium: BMO Field; Referee: Fotis Bazakos

=== MLS Cup Playoffs ===
==== Wild card ====
October 22 Wild card	Chicago Fire FC	3–1	Orlando City SC	Bridgeview, Illinois
8:30 pm EDT	Gutman (yellow card) 45'; Gutiérrez 48'; Cuypers 56', 68'	Report	Atuesta (yellow card) 58'; Schlegel (yellow card) 74'; Spicer 89'; Brekalo (yellow card) 90'	Stadium: SeatGeek Stadium; Attendance: 13,783; Referee: Drew Fischer

=== U.S. Open Cup ===
Orlando entered the 2025 U.S. Open Cup following a one year absence from the competition as a result of MLS decision making. MLS increased its number of teams participating from 10 to 16 in 2025. Following the entry of any eligible MLS team not entering another cup competition (nine in this instance), Orlando qualified as one of the remaining seven teams ranked highest in the previous season's Supporters' Shield standings excluding Canadian teams and those competing in CONCACAF Champions Cup.

May 7 Round of 32	Tampa Bay Rowdies (Florida)	0–5	(Florida) Orlando City SC	St. Petersburg, Florida
7:30 p.m. EDT	Crisostomo (yellow card) 13'; Wyke (yellow card) 83'	Report	Caraballo 34', 36', (yellow card) 55'; Enrique 42'; McGuire 59'; Þórhallsson 90'	Stadium: Al Lang Stadium; Attendance: 3,735; Referee: Natalie Simon

May 21 Round of 16	Orlando City SC (Florida)	2–3	(Tennessee) Nashville SC	Orlando, Florida
7:30 p.m. EDT	Pašalić 17'; Enrique 58'; Freeman (yellow card) 72'	Report	Schlegel 23' (o.g.); Qasem 41'; Yazbek (yellow card) 57'; Corcoran (yellow card) 69'; Meyer 79'	Stadium: Inter&Co Stadium; Referee: Joshua Encarnación

=== Leagues Cup ===
The 2025 Leagues Cup was played from July 29 to August 31. Orlando qualified for the competition by reaching the 2024 MLS Cup playoffs.

July 30 Group Stage	UNAM (Mexico)	1–1 (4–3 p)	(United States) Orlando City SC	Orlando, Florida
8:00 p.m. EDT	Ruvalcaba (yellow card) 44'; Silva (yellow card) 68'; Carrasquilla 80'	Report	Schlegel 5', (yellow card) 90+5'; Freeman (yellow card) 44'; Brekalo (yellow card) 45+1'; I. Angulo (yellow card) 45+2'; Gallese (yellow card) 59'	Stadium: Inter&Co Stadium; Attendance: 14,744; Referee: Adonai Escobedo
	Penalties
	Martínez (penalty missed); A. Angulo (penalty scored); Silva (penalty scored); Quispe (penalty scored); Carrasquilla (penalty scored)		Ojeda (penalty scored); Atuesta (penalty missed); Smith (penalty scored); Araújo (penalty missed); Muriel (penalty scored)

August 2 Group Stage	Orlando City SC (United States)	3–1	(Mexico) Atlas	Orlando, Florida
6:00 p.m. EDT	Angulo 9'; Ojeda 57', (yellow card) 90+9'; Jansson (yellow card) 90+7'; Pašalić 90+12'	Report	Cóccaro 50', (red card) 90+7'	Stadium: Inter&Co Stadium; Attendance: 15,772; Referee: Humberto Panjoj

August 6 Group Stage	Orlando City SC (United States)	5–1	(Mexico) Necaxa	Orlando, Florida
7:00 p.m. EDT	Brekalo (yellow card) 5'; Ojeda 15', 51'; Muriel 35', 37', 45+1'; Smith (yellow card) 69'	Report	Monreal (yellow card) 67'; Peña 71'	Stadium: Inter&Co Stadium; Attendance: 13,255; Referee: Fernando Hernández

August 20 Quarterfinals	Toluca (Mexico)	0–0 (5–6 p)	(United States) Orlando City SC	Carson, California
9:00 p.m. EDT	Pereira (yellow card) 45+2'	Report	Brekalo (yellow card) 63'; Schlegel (yellow card) 65'; Atuesta (yellow card) 76'	Stadium: Dignity Health Sports Park; Attendance: 16,559; Referee: Saíd Martínez
	Penalties
	Vega (penalty scored); Pereira (penalty scored); Morales (penalty scored); Gallardo (penalty scored); Romero (penalty scored); Castro (penalty missed); Domínguez (penalty missed)		Ojeda (penalty scored); Jansson (penalty scored); Freeman (penalty scored); Gerbet (penalty scored); Smith (penalty scored); Enrique (penalty missed); Gallese (penalty scored)

August 27 Semifinals	Inter Miami CF (United States)	3–1	(United States) Orlando City SC	Fort Lauderdale, Florida
8:30 p.m. EDT	Fray (yellow card) 65'; Messi 77' (pen.), 88', (yellow card) 90+4'; Suárez (yellow card) 80'; Segovia 90+1'; Busquets (yellow card) 90+3'	Report	Brekalo (yellow card) 18' (yellow-red card) 75'; Atuesta (yellow card) 19'; Pašalić 45+1'; Araújo (yellow card) 69'	Stadium: Chase Stadium; Attendance: 17,878; Referee: Walter López

August 31 3rd Place	LA Galaxy (United States)	2–1	(United States) Orlando City SC	Carson, California
5:00 p.m. EDT	Reus 9'; Paintsil 67'; Pec (yellow card) 90+6'	Report	Atuesta (yellow card) 37'; Ojeda 60'	Stadium: Dignity Health Sports Park; Attendance: 12,129; Referee: Pierre-Luc Lauziere (Canada)

== Squad statistics ==
=== Appearances ===
Starting appearances are listed first, followed by substitute appearances after the + symbol where applicable.

No.	Pos	Nat	Player	Total		MLS		Playoffs		Open Cup		Leagues Cup	
No.	Pos	Nat	Player	Apps	Goals	Apps	Goals	Apps	Goals	Apps	Goals	Apps	Goals
Goalkeepers
1	GK	(Peru) PER	Pedro Gallese	40	0	32	0	1	0	1	0	6	0
12	GK	(Venezuela) VEN	Javier Otero	3	0	2	0	0	0	1	0	0	0
99	GK	(United States) USA	Carlos Mercado	0	0	0	0	0	0	0	0	0	0
Defenders
3	DF	(Brazil) BRA	Rafael Santos	19	0	6+11	0	0	0	1+1	0	0	0
4	DF	(Slovenia) SLO	David Brekalo	37	1	27+2	1	1	0	1+1	0	5	0
6	DF	(Sweden) SWE	Robin Jansson	37	1	30	1	1	0	1	0	5	0
15	DF	(Argentina) ARG	Rodrigo Schlegel	40	1	31	0	1	0	2	0	6	1
17	DF	(Iceland) ISL	Dagur Dan Þórhallsson	35	4	11+20	3	0	0	2	1	1+1	0
21	DF	(Spain) ESP	Adrián Marín	8	0	4+1	0	0+1	0	0	0	1+1	0
24	DF	(United States) USA	Kyle Smith	35	0	12+17	0	0	0	1	0	3+2	0
29	DF	(United States) USA	Tahir Reid-Brown	0	0	0	0	0	0	0	0	0	0
30	DF	(United States) USA	Alex Freeman	38	6	26+3	6	1	0	2	0	5+1	0
68	DF	(United States) USA	Thomas Williams	1	0	0+1	0	0	0	0	0	0	0
96	DF	(United States) USA	Zakaria Taifi	9	0	0+6	0	0	0	0+1	0	0+2	0
Midfielders
5	MF	(Uruguay) URU	César Araújo	31	2	20+2	2	1	0	2	0	6	0
10	MF	(Argentina) ARG	Martín Ojeda	42	20	30+3	16	1	0	2	0	6	4
16	MF	(Peru) PER	Wilder Cartagena	0	0	0	0	0	0	0	0	0	0
20	MF	(Colombia) COL	Eduard Atuesta	33	0	25+3	0	1	0	0	0	4	0
25	MF	(United States) USA	Colin Guske	7	0	0+5	0	0+1	0	0+1	0	0	0
23	MF	(Ghana) GHA	Shak Mohammed	2	0	0+2	0	0	0	0	0	0	0
35	MF	(France) FRA	Joran Gerbet	23	0	13+7	0	0	0	1	0	0+2	0
65	MF	(Venezuela) VEN	Gustavo Caraballo	6	2	0+5	0	0	0	1	2	0	0
95	MF	(Chile) CHI	Favian Loyola	0	0	0	0	0	0	0	0	0	0
Forwards
7	FW	(Argentina) ARG	Ramiro Enrique	31	10	9+15	8	0	0	2	2	2+3	0
9	FW	(Colombia) COL	Luis Muriel	41	12	25+8	9	0+1	0	0+1	0	4+2	3
11	FW	(Colombia) COL	Nicolás Rodríguez	17	1	2+10	1	0	0	1	0	1+3	0
13	FW	(United States) USA	Duncan McGuire	23	4	6+12	3	1	0	0+2	1	0+2	0
14	FW	(Trinidad and Tobago) TTO	Tyrese Spicer	12	2	2+6	1	0+1	1	0	0	0+3	0
34	FW	(Japan) JPN	Yutaro Tsukada	0	0	0	0	0	0	0	0	0	0
77	FW	(Colombia) COL	Iván Angulo	42	1	30+3	0	1	0	0+2	0	6	1
87	FW	(Croatia) CRO	Marco Pašalić	41	15	32+1	12	1	0	1	1	5+1	2

== Player movement ==
Per Major League Soccer and club policies, terms of the deals do not get disclosed.

=== MLS SuperDraft picks ===
Draft picks are not automatically signed to the team roster. The 2025 MLS SuperDraft was held on December 20, 2024. Orlando made four selections.

2024 Orlando City MLS SuperDraft Picks
Round	Selection	Player	Position	College	Status
1	27	(France) Joran Gerbet	MF	(South Carolina) Clemson Tigers	Signed
2	46	(United States) Titus Sandy Jr	DF	(South Carolina) Clemson Tigers	Signed with Orlando City B in August 2025
2	57	(Ghana) Collins Oduro	FW	Indiana Hoosiers	Returned to school
3	87	(Japan) Takahiro Fujita	DF	(West Virginia) Marshall Thundering Herd	Returned to school

=== Transfers in ===
No.	Name	Pos.	Transferred from	Fee/notes	Date	Ref.
25	(United States) Colin Guske	DM	(United States) Orlando City B	Signed Homegrown contract	December 16, 2024	
11	(Colombia) Nicolás Rodríguez	RW	(Colombia) Fortaleza	Undisclosed fee, reportedly $1.5m	January 17, 2025	
87	(Croatia) Marco Pašalić	RW	(Croatia) HNK Rijeka	Undisclosed fee, reportedly $5m	February 5, 2025	
20	(Colombia) Eduard Atuesta	DM	(Brazil) Palmeiras	Undisclosed fee	February 10, 2025	
65	(Venezuela) Gustavo Caraballo	AM	(United States) Orlando City B	Signed Homegrown contract	March 14, 2025	
96	(United States) Zakaria Taifi	RB	(United States) Orlando City B	Signed Homegrown contract	May 17, 2025	
14	(Trinidad and Tobago) Tyrese Spicer	LW	(Canada) Toronto FC	Up to $550K in GAM	August 1, 2025	
21	(Spain) Adrián Marín	LB	(Portugal) Braga	Undisclosed fee	August 7, 2025	

=== Transfers out ===
No.	Name	Pos.	Transferred to	Fee/notes	Date	Ref.
8	(Brazil) Felipe Martins	CM	(Brazil) FC Cascavel	Contract expired; signed with Cascavel on January 17, 2025	December 5, 2024	
22	(Argentina) Gastón González	LW	(Argentina) Defensa y Justicia	Option declined; signed with Defensa y Justicia on January 25, 2025	December 5, 2024	
33	(United States) Jeorgio Kocevski	CM	(United States) Ventura County FC	Option declined; announced on Ventura County FC roster on March 6, 2025	December 5, 2024	
20	(Canada) Luca Petrasso	LB	(Canada) CF Montréal	Option declined; signed with CF Montréal on February 7, 2025	December 5, 2024	
28	(Somalia) Abdi Salim	CB	(United States) San Antonio FC	Option declined; signed with San Antonio FC on June 20, 2025	December 5, 2024	
18	(Norway) Heine Gikling Bruseth	CM	(United States) San Diego FC	Selected in 2024 MLS expansion draft	December 11, 2024	
10	(Uruguay) Facundo Torres	LW	(Brazil) Palmeiras	Undisclosed fee, reportedly $14m	December 20, 2024	
31	(United States) Mason Stajduhar	GK	(United States) Real Salt Lake	Traded in exchange for $50,000 GAM with a potential further $150,000 GAM and Real Salt Lake's natural second round pick in 2026 MLS SuperDraft pending performance-based conditions	January 15, 2025	
27	(United States) Jack Lynn	CF	Retired		January 18, 2025	
26	(United States) Michael Halliday	RB	(United States) Houston Dynamo	Traded in exchange for Houston's natural first round pick in the 2026 MLS SuperDraft and a sell-on percentage	February 18, 2025	
14	(Uruguay) Nicolás Lodeiro	AM	(United States) Houston Dynamo	Mutually terminated contract; signed with Houston Dynamo on February 19, 2025	February 18, 2025	
3	(Brazil) Rafael Santos	LB	(United States) Colorado Rapids	Up to $325,000 in GAM plus sell-on percentage	August 15, 2025	
7	(Argentina) Ramiro Enrique	CF	(Saudi Arabia) Al-Kholood	Undisclosed fee	September 8, 2025	
