= David Brekalo =

Slovenian footballer (born 1998)

- Brekalo with Orlando City in 2026

Personal information
- Date of birth: 3 December 1998 (age 27)
- Place of birth: Ljubljana, Slovenia
- Height: 1.86 m (6 ft 1 in)
- Positions: Centre-back; left-back

Team information
- Current team: Orlando City
- Number: 4

Youth career
- 2007–2017: Bravo

Senior career*
Years	Team	Apps	(Gls)
2017–2021	Bravo	124	(12)
2021–2024	Viking	60	(7)
2024–	Orlando City	76	(4)

International career^{‡}
2016	Slovenia U18	6	(0)
2016	Slovenia U19	7	(0)
2018–2021	Slovenia U21	14	(1)
2022–	Slovenia	32	(1)
- * Club domestic league appearances and goals as of 23:41, 7 November 2026 (UTC) ‡ National team caps and goals as of 22:58, 6 October 2026 (UTC)

David Brekalo (born 3 December 1998) is a Slovenian professional footballer who plays as a centre-back or left-back for Major League Soccer club Orlando City and the Slovenia national team.

Brekalo began his club career with Bravo in the Slovenian Third League in the 2016–17 season, and by the 2019–20 season, he had helped them get promoted to the top tier of Slovenian football, winning two lower league titles on the way. In 2021, Brekalo moved abroad for the first time and signed with Eliteserien club Viking. He made his senior international debut for Slovenia in 2022 and represented the country at UEFA Euro 2024. In 2024, Brekalo signed with Major League Soccer club Orlando City.

== Youth career ==
Brekalo is a youth product of Bravo, where he began his football career in 2007. He initially played as a left-back when he was younger, but ultimately transitioned to playing primarily as a centre-back.

== Club career ==
=== Bravo ===
Brekalo made his senior debut for Bravo during the 2016–17 Slovenian Third League season, making 13 appearances and helping the club gain promotion to the second tier. Two seasons later, in 2018–19, Bravo won the Slovenian Second League title and gained promotion to the top tier of Slovenian football, the Slovenian PrvaLiga, for the first time. Brekalo made his top flight debut on 14 July 2019 in a game against Olimpija Ljubljana, starting the match and playing the full 90 minutes in an eventual 2–0 defeat.

=== Viking ===
In January 2021, he was linked to Swedish club Malmö FF. On 11 August 2021, he instead joined Norwegian club Viking FK, signing a three-and-a-half-year contract. He made his debut only four days later, in a 3–2 win against Molde, where he scored the winning goal in added time. On 28 November 2021, he received a red card for pushing teammate Patrik Gunnarsson in the final minutes of a 3–2 win against Kristiansund.

=== Orlando City ===
On 8 February 2024, Brekalo signed with Major League Soccer (MLS) club Orlando City. The transfer fee was approximately $2.5 million. He made his Orlando City debut on 24 February, against CF Montréal. He scored his first goal for the club on 13 April against D.C. United.

Brekalo began playing as a left-back for Orlando City during their 2025 season after struggling with injuries during his first season in MLS. Orlando City head coach Óscar Pareja said that Brekalo's ability to play both as a centre-back and a left-back made the team better overall. On 15 May 2025, Brekalo was named to the Team of the Matchday for providing two assists in a 3–1 victory over Charlotte FC a day earlier. On 22 July 2026, Brekalo scored the opening goal in a 4–0 win at the San Jose Earthquakes, and his performance throughout the game saw him named to the Team of the Matchday for the second time in his MLS career.

== International career ==
Brekalo made his international debut for Slovenia on 26 March 2022 in a 1–1 draw against Croatia.

He was included in Slovenia's 26-man roster for UEFA Euro 2024.

== Career statistics ==
=== Club ===
As of 19 November 2026

Appearances and goals by club, season and competition
Club	Season	League			National cup (Note: Includes Slovenian Football Cup, Norwegian Football Cup, U.S. Open Cup)		Continental (Note: Includes UEFA Europa Conference League, CONCACAF Champions Cup)		Other		Total	
Club	Season	Division	Apps	Goals	Apps	Goals	Apps	Goals	Apps	Goals	Apps	Goals
Bravo	2016–17	Slovenian Third League	13	0	0	0	—		—		13	0
Bravo	2017–18	Slovenian Second League	26	2	0	0	—		—		26	2
Bravo	2018–19	Slovenian Second League	28	4	1	0	—		—		29	4
Bravo	2019–20	Slovenian PrvaLiga	23	3	0	0	—		—		23	3
Bravo	2020–21	Slovenian PrvaLiga	31	3	0	0	—		—		31	3
Bravo	2021–22	Slovenian PrvaLiga	3	0	0	0	—		—		3	0
Bravo	Total		124	12	1	0	0	0	0	0	125	12
Viking	2021	Eliteserien	11	2	0	0	—		—		11	2
Viking	2022	Eliteserien	26	2	4	1	6	0	—		36	3
Viking	2023	Eliteserien	23	3	4	0	—		—		27	3
Viking	Total		60	7	8	1	6	0	0	0	74	8
Orlando City	2024	Major League Soccer	19	1	—		2	0	7 (Note: Three appearances in Leagues Cup, four appearances in MLS Cup playoffs)	0	28	1
Orlando City	2025	Major League Soccer	29	1	2	0	—		6 (Note: Five appearances in Leagues Cup, one appearance in MLS Cup playoffs)	0	37	1
Orlando City	2026	Major League Soccer	28	2	3	1	—		2 (Note: One appearance in Leagues Cup, one appearance in MLS Cup playoffs)	0	33	3
Orlando City	Total		76	4	5	1	2	0	15	0	98	5
Career total			260	23	14	2	8	0	15	0	297	25

=== International ===
As of match played 6 October 2026

Appearances and goals by national team and year
National team	Year	Apps	Goals
Slovenia	2022	6	0
Slovenia	2023	5	1
Slovenia	2024	8	0
Slovenia	2025	7	0
Slovenia	2026	6	0
Total		32	1

Scores and results list Slovenia's goal tally first, score column indicates score after each Brekalo goal.

List of international goals scored by David Brekalo
No.	Date	Venue	Opponent	Score	Result	Competition
1	23 March 2023	Astana Arena, Astana, Kazakhstan	Kazakhstan	1–1	2–1	UEFA Euro 2024 qualifying

== Honours ==
Bravo

- Slovenian Second League: 2018–19
- Slovenian Third League – Centre: 2016–17

Individual

- Eliteserien Player of the Month: August 2023
