= Rafael Santos (footballer, born 5 February 1998) =

Brazilian footballer (born 1998)

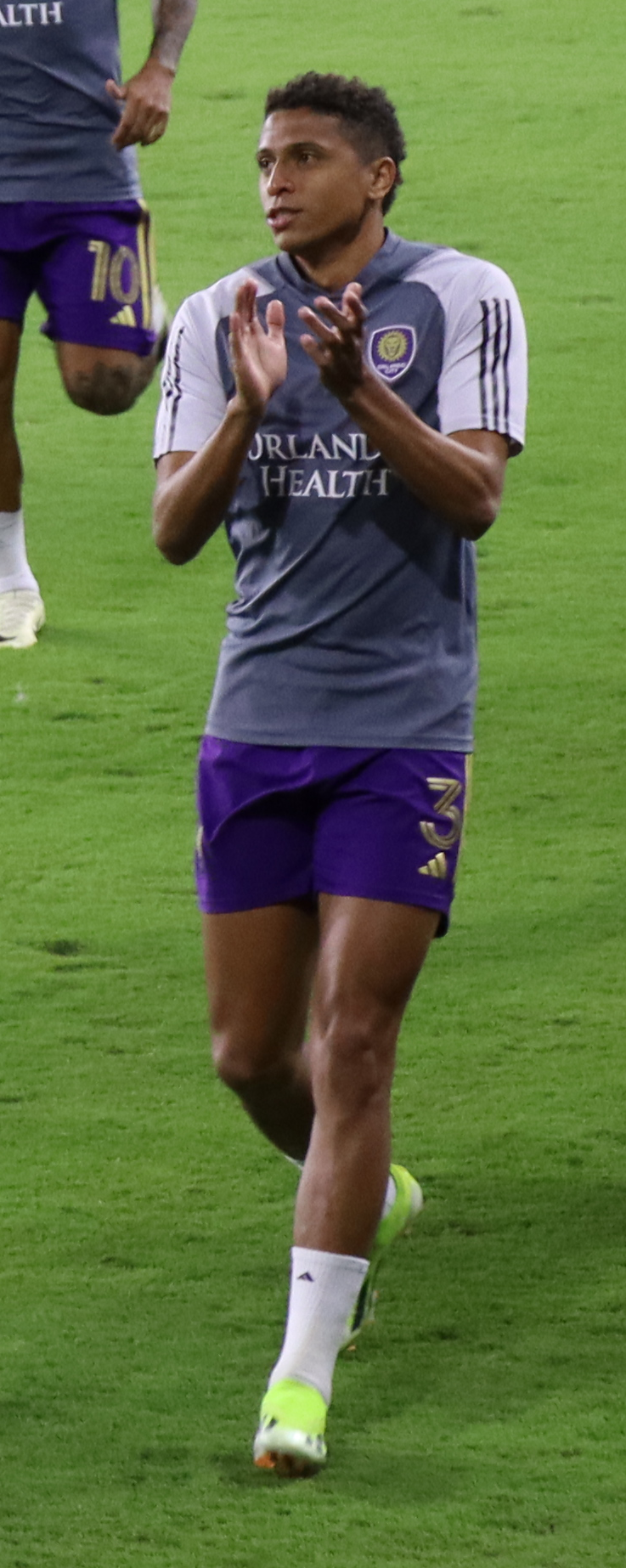
- Santos with Orlando City in 2024

Personal information
- Full name: Rafael Lucas Cardoso dos Santos
- Date of birth: 5 February 1998 (age 28)
- Place of birth: Londrina, Paraná, Brazil
- Height: 1.80 m (5 ft 11 in)
- Position: Left-back

Team information
- Current team: St. Louis City SC
- Number: 20

Youth career
- 2012–2013: Figueirense
- 2014–2015: Inter de Limeira
- 2016–2017: Mirassol
- 2017: → Atlético Madrid (youth loan)

Senior career*
Years	Team	Apps	(Gls)
2017	Mirassol	13	(1)
2018	→ Cruzeiro (loan)	1	(0)
2019–2022	Cruzeiro	30	(1)
2020	→ Chapecoense (loan)	5	(0)
2021	→ Inter de Limeira (loan)	10	(1)
2021	→ Ponte Preta (loan)	26	(3)
2022	→ Coritiba (loan)	15	(0)
2023–2025	Orlando City	75	(2)
2025	Colorado Rapids	7	(1)
2026–	St. Louis City SC	19	(1)
- * Club domestic league appearances and goals as of 03:41, 25 October 2026 (UTC)

Rafael Lucas Cardoso dos Santos (born 5 February 1998) is a Brazilian professional footballer who plays as a left-back for Major League Soccer club St. Louis City SC.

== Career ==
=== Mirassol ===
Santos developed in the academy of Mirassol, making his senior debut for the club on 2 July 2017 in the 2017 Campeonato Paulista, playing the full 90 minutes against Ferroviária in a 2–1 defeat. He scored his first goal on 27 August 2017, the opening goal in a 4–2 win over Penapolense in the same competition.

=== Cruzeiro ===
In 2018, he joined Cruzeiro, initially on loan. He made 27 appearances for the club's under-20 team including in the 2018 U-20 Copa Libertadores. On 14 August 2018, Santos made his first team debut for the club as a 76th-minute substitute for David in a 2–0 Série A defeat to Vasco da Gama. Having joined Cruzeiro permanently in 2019, Santos went on loan for spells with Chapecoense, Inter de Limeira and Ponte Preta in Série B and later with Coritiba in Série A. He made a combined 106 senior appearances while in Brazil in all competitions.

=== Orlando City ===
On 5 January 2023, Santos joined Major League Soccer club Orlando City ahead of the 2023 season on a two-year contract with an additional two club option years. On 20 May, Santos scored his first goal for the club in a 3–1 win at Inter Miami with the help of an assist from Duncan McGuire.

On 9 March 2024, Santos assisted in the fastest goal in club history when he won the ball from Minnesota United and passed it to McGuire, who scored in under thirteen seconds, beating Tesho Akindele's previous record of 31 seconds. However, Orlando would go on to lose the game 3–2. On 19 April, Santos received a second yellow card in a match at CF Montréal after coming on as a half-time substitute for Kyle Smith after Smith had received a yellow card early in the match. Santos would later be fined by the MLS Disciplinary Committee for failing to leave the field in a timely manner after receiving the second yellow card.

=== Colorado Rapids ===
On 15 August 2025, Santos was transferred to fellow MLS club Colorado Rapids in exchange for $125,000 in General Allocation Money (GAM) and a sell-on percentage plus an additional $200,000 in GAM if performance metrics were met. On 23 August, Santos made his debut for his new team when he came on as an 80th-minute substitute for Sam Vines in a 3–0 defeat to LA Galaxy. On 27 September, Santos scored his first goal for the Rapids when he converted a free kick in a 1–1 draw with Minnesota United. On 26 November, the Rapids announced that they had declined Santos' contract option, but were attempting to sign him to a new contract.

=== St. Louis City SC ===
A new contract with the Rapids ultimately did not materialize, and on 27 January 2026, Santos signed with MLS club St. Louis City SC through 30 June 2027 and with a team option for the 2027–28 and 2028–29 seasons. Santos made his debut in a season opening 1–1 draw against Charlotte FC on 21 February. On 13 May, Santos scored his first goal for St. Louis City SC, the team's second in a 2–1 win over Los Angeles FC, after entering in the 10th-minute as a substitute for Jaziel Orozco, who came off injured.

== Career statistics ==
As of match played 24 October 2026

Appearances and goals by club, season and competition
Club	Season	League			State league (Note: Includes Campeonato Paulista and Campeonato Mineiro)		National cup (Note: Includes Copa do Brasil and U.S. Open Cup)		Continental (Note: Includes Copa Libertadores and CONCACAF Champions Cup)		Other		Total	
Club	Season	Division	Apps	Goals	Apps	Goals	Apps	Goals	Apps	Goals	Apps	Goals	Apps	Goals
Mirassol	2017	—			13	1	—		—		—		13	1
Cruzeiro (loan)	2018	Série A	1	0	—		—		0	0	—		1	0
Cruzeiro	2019	Série A	2	0	—		—		0	0	—		2	0
Cruzeiro	2020	Série A	0	0	3	0	1	0	—		—		4	0
Cruzeiro	2021	Série B	0	0	0	0	0	0	—		—		0	0
Cruzeiro	2022	Série B	13	0	12	1	5	0	—		—		30	1
Cruzeiro	Total		15	0	15	1	6	0	0	0	0	0	36	1
Chapecoense (loan)	2020	Série B	5	0	0	0	—		—		—		5	0
Inter de Limeira (loan)	2021	—			10	1	—		—		—		10	1
Ponte Preta (loan)	2021	Série B	26	3	—		—		—		—		26	3
Coritiba (loan)	2022	Série A	15	0	—		—		—		—		15	0
Orlando City	2023	Major League Soccer	26	1	—		1	0	1	0	3 (Note: Appearances in MLS Cup playoffs)	0	34	1
Orlando City	2024	Major League Soccer	32	1	—		—		3	0	5	0	42	1
Orlando City	2025	Major League Soccer	17	0	—		2	0	—		—		19	0
Orlando City	Total		75	2	0	0	3	0	4	0	8	0	96	2
Colorado Rapids	2025	Major League Soccer	7	1	—		—		—		—		7	1
St. Louis City SC	2026	Major League Soccer	19	1	—		0	0	—		—		19	1
Career total			163	7	38	3	9	0	4	0	8	0	228	10

== Honors ==
Chapecoense

- Série B: 2020

Cruzeiro

- Série B: 2022
