= Titus Sandy Jr =

Dominican footballer (born 2002)

Personal information
- Date of birth: 19 January 2002 (age 24)
- Place of birth: Charlotte, North Carolina, US
- Height: 1.83 m (6 ft 0 in)
- Position: Centre-back

Team information
- Current team: Orlando City B
- Number: 36

Youth career
- 2016–2021: Charlotte Soccer Academy

College career
Years	Team	Apps	(Gls)
2021–2024	Clemson Tigers	48	(0)

Senior career*
Years	Team	Apps	(Gls)
2025–	Orlando City B	29	(0)
2025	→ Orlando City (loan)	0	(0)

International career^{‡}
2026–	Dominica	4	(0)
- * Club domestic league appearances and goals as of 03:03, September 5, 2026 (UTC) ‡ National team caps and goals as of 23:42, 29 October 2026 (UTC)

Titus Sandy Jr (born 19 January 2002) is a professional footballer who plays as an centre-back for MLS Next Pro club Orlando City B. Born in the United States, he plays for the Dominica national team.

== Club career ==
A product of the Charlotte Soccer Academy, Sandy played college soccer with the Clemson Tigers, and helped them win the 2023 ACC men's soccer tournament.

On 20 December 2024, he was drafted 46th overall by Orlando City during the 2025 MLS SuperDraft. In June 2025, Sandy Jr competed in the 2025 edition of The Soccer Tournament with Drip FC, scoring three goals across six games.

On 17 August 2025, he signed with Orlando City B through the 2026 season. On 11 October, he signed with the senior Orlando City SC on a short-term contract for a Major League Soccer match against Vancouver Whitecaps FC. On 27 October 2026, Sandy Jr's contract option was declined by Orlando City B.

== International career ==
Born in the United States, Sandy is of Dominica descent. He was called up to the Dominica national team for a set of 2025–26 CONCACAF Series matches in March 2026. He debuted with Dominica in a 2–0 loss to Guyana on 27 March 2026.

== Career statistics ==
=== Club ===
As of match played 4 September 2026

Club	Season	League			Other		Total	
Club	Season	Division	Apps	Goals	Apps	Goals	Apps	Goals
Orlando City B	2025	MLS Next Pro	6	0	—		6	0
Orlando City B	2026	MLS Next Pro	23	0	—		23	0
Orlando City B	Total		29	0	0	0	29	0
Orlando City (loan)	2025	Major League Soccer	0	0	—		0	0
Career total			29	0	0	0	29	0

=== International ===
As of match played 4 October 2026

Appearances and goals by national team and year
National team	Year	Apps	Goals
Dominica	2026	4	0
Total		4	0

== Honours ==
Clemson Tigers

- ACC men's soccer tournament: 2023
