= Gustavo Caraballo =

Venezuelan footballer (born 2008)

Personal information
- Full name: Gustavo Andrés Caraballo Delgado
- Date of birth: 29 August 2008 (age 18)
- Place of birth: Valencia, Venezuela
- Height: 1.75 m (5 ft 9 in)
- Positions: Attacking midfielder; winger

Team information
- Current team: Orlando City
- Number: 65

Youth career
- 2022–2023: Orlando City

Senior career*
Years	Team	Apps	(Gls)
2023–2025	Orlando City B	2	(0)
2025	→ Orlando City (loan)	2	(0)
2025–	Orlando City	3	(0)
2025–	→ Orlando City B (loan)	34	(9)

International career^{‡}
2025	Venezuela U17	10	(3)
2026–	Venezuela U20	2	(0)
- * Club domestic league appearances and goals as of 22:20, 20 September 2026 (UTC) ‡ National team caps and goals as of 05:58, 25 June 2026 (UTC)

Gustavo Andrés Caraballo Delgado (born 29 August 2008) is a Venezuelan professional footballer who plays as an attacking midfielder or winger for Major League Soccer club Orlando City.

== Youth career ==
Caraballo joined the Orlando City Academy and played for the academy's under-15 side. With the under-15 side Caraballo won the golden boot award of the 2023 U-15 Generation Adidas Cup.

On 20 April 2025, Caraballo scored a brace for the under-18 team in a 2–1 overtime triumph over Colorado Rapids' under-18 squad to help secure the 2025 U-18 Generation Adidas Cup. Caraballo's goals helped Orlando City's under-18 squad win the championship for the first time. Caraballo's efforts throughout the tournament saw him named the most valuable player. On 2 July, Caraballo was named to the Eastern Conference roster for the 2025 MLS NEXT All-Star Game at Parmer Field in Austin, Texas on 21 July. The Eastern Conference defeated the Western Conference 4–3, with Caraballo scoring the second goal for the East.

== Club career ==
=== Orlando City B ===
On 14 August 2023, Caraballo signed with Orlando City B in MLS Next Pro, the reserve affiliate of Orlando City. At 14 years, 11 months, and 16 days, Caraballo became the youngest player to sign a professional contract with the club. On 28 August 2024, Caraballo made his professional debut when he came on as a 91st-minute substitute for Jorge Almaguer in a 5–2 loss to New York City FC II. In Caraballo's first season, he only made two brief appearances at the end of matches.

=== Orlando City ===
On 25 January 2025, Caraballo made his unofficial debut with the first team when he started a Florida Cup pre-season friendly match against Atlético Mineiro. On 22 February, Caraballo signed a short-term agreement with Orlando City ahead of the opening match of the season against Philadelphia Union. Caraballo was an unused substitute as the Lions lost 2–4. In the following match on 1 March, Caraballo made his debut as a 97th-minute substitute for Ramiro Enrique in a 4–2 win over Toronto FC. Caraballo's debut made him the youngest player, at 16 years and 184 days old, to make an appearance for the club, beating Alejandro Granados' record set in 2023. On 14 March, Caraballo signed a first-team contract with the club through 2027 with a club option for 2028, making him the 18th homegrown player and the youngest homegrown player to sign a first team contract. On 7 May, Caraballo made his first career start for the team and scored his first goals when he secured a brace in a 5–0 win over the Tampa Bay Rowdies in the U.S. Open Cup. Caraballo's goals also made him the youngest goalscorer in team history at 16 years and 251 days, beating Cyle Larin's previous record of 19 years and 360 days. On 17 May, Caraballo scored his first professional league goal, the first of a 3–0 win over rivals Inter Miami II.

== Personal life ==
Caraballo is the son of Venezuelan international Gustavo Caraballo Sr. who played professionally in Venezuela.

== International career ==
=== Youth ===
In August 2022, Caraballo received his first call-up to the United States U15 for training. However, he did not play in any matches.

Caraballo was added to the Venezuela U17 squad for preparations ahead of the 2025 FIFA U-17 World Cup. Caraballo arrived for two friendlies against Panama ahead of traveling to Europe to face England, Germany, and Israel in friendly matches hosted in Duisburg, Germany. Caraballo made his debut on 29 August against Panama and scored as Venezuela won 4–0. In the following match against Panama, Caraballo scored a brace to secure a 5–1 scoreline. On 16 September, Caraballo received another call-up, this time for two friendly matches against Colombia. He would play the second match on 20 September as Venezuela lost 1–0. Caraballo rejoined the U17 squad for the Dubai Youth Challenge, and he came on as a 60th-minute substitution in a 1–1 draw with Uzbekistan on 20 October. Caraballo started against Uganda in another 1–1 draw and against Morocco in a 3–3 draw on 23 October and 25 October respectively. Two days after the match against Morocco, Caraballo substituted on in a 2–0 win over Burkina Faso.

Caraballo was selected to represent Venezuela at the 2025 FIFA U-17 World Cup and they were drawn in Group E with England, Egypt, and Haiti. On 7 November, Caraballo made his competition debut as a 75th-minute substitute for Juan Uribe in a 1–1 draw with Egypt. In the following match against Haiti, Caraballo started as Venezuela won 4–2 and finished top of their group unbeaten. In the round of 32, Venezuela were defeated 2–1 by North Korea.

On 27 May 2026, Caraballo was called up to the Venezuela U20 team for the 2026 Maurice Revello Tournament. Caraballo made his debut for the U20s as a starter in a 3–1 loss to Ivory Coast.

=== Senior ===
On 30 September 2025, Caraballo received a call-up to the Venezuela national team for friendlies against Argentina and Belize on 10 October and 14 October, respectively. Venezuela's match against Belize in Chicago was canceled after the event's production company failed to find an alternative venue due to security issues in the city caused by protests from the U.S. National Guard being deployed to the city.

== Career statistics ==
As of match played 20 September 2026

Appearances and goals by club, season, and competition
Club	Season	League			U.S. Open Cup		Continental		Playoffs		Other		Total	
Club	Season	Division	Apps	Goals	Apps	Goals	Apps	Goals	Apps	Goals	Apps	Goals	Apps	Goals
Orlando City B	2023	MLS Next Pro	0	0	—		—		0	0	—		0	0
Orlando City B	2024	MLS Next Pro	2	0	—		—		0	0	—		2	0
Orlando City B	Total		2	0	0	0	0	0	0	0	0	0	2	0
Orlando City (loan)	2025	Major League Soccer	2	0	—		—		—		—		2	0
Orlando City	2025	Major League Soccer	3	0	1	2	—		0	0	0	0	4	2
Orlando City	2026	Major League Soccer	0	0	0	0	—		—		1 (Note: Appearances in Leagues Cup)	0	1	0
Orlando City	Orlando City total		5	0	1	2	0	0	0	0	1	0	7	2
Orlando City B (loan)	2025	MLS Next Pro	15	2	—		—		—		—		15	2
Orlando City B (loan)	2026	MLS Next Pro	19	7	—		—		—		—		19	7
Orlando City B (loan)	Total		34	9	0	0	0	0	0	0	0	0	34	9
Career total			40	9	1	2	0	0	0	0	1	0	42	11
