= 2022 U.S. Open Cup final =

2022 final of the Lamar Hunt U.S. Open Cup

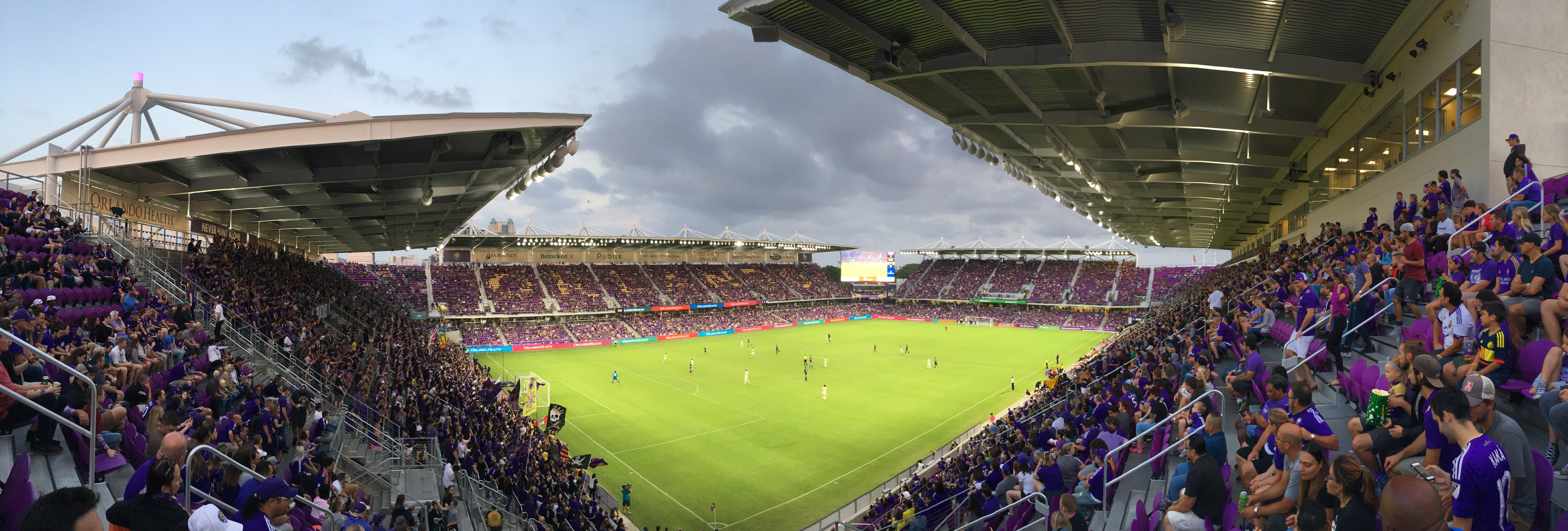
- Exploria Stadium, the host venue for the final
- Event: 2022 U.S. Open Cup
| Orlando City SC | Sacramento Republic FC |
| MLS | USLC |
| 3 | 0 |
- Date: September 7, 2022
- Venue: Exploria Stadium, Orlando, Florida
- Man of the Match: Facundo Torres (Orlando City SC)
- Referee: Ramy Touchan
- Attendance: 25,527

The 2022 Lamar Hunt U.S. Open Cup final was a soccer match played on September 7, 2022, at Exploria Stadium in Orlando, Florida, United States. It was played to determine the winner of the 2022 U.S. Open Cup, the 107th edition of the oldest competition in U.S. soccer, which is open to amateur and professional soccer teams affiliated with the United States Soccer Federation.

Orlando City defeated Sacramento, winning 3–0 with three goals in the second half to clinch their first championship as an MLS club. They became the second team from Florida to win the U.S. Open Cup and qualified for the 2023 CONCACAF Champions League.

== Road to the final ==
The Lamar Hunt U.S. Open Cup is an annual soccer competition open to adult teams in the United States that are affiliated with the United States Soccer Federation. Its 103 participants include professional and amateur teams, with the exception of reserve and academy teams that are directly owned and operated by Major League Soccer (MLS) clubs. The 2022 tournament was the 107th edition of the U.S. Open Cup, the oldest ongoing soccer tournament in the United States. It was the first U.S. Open Cup to be played since 2019 due to the COVID-19 pandemic, which resulted in the cancellation of the 2020 and 2021 editions.

The 25 eligible MLS teams entered in the third and fourth rounds, facing teams from USL Championship (USLC), USL League One (USL1), the National Independent Soccer Association (NISA), and amateur leagues. From the third round onward, participants were organized into groups of four to six teams based on geographic location and pairings were drawn accordingly. Hosts were also determined with a random draw with priority given to venues that met minimum tournament standards.

The finalists, Orlando City SC and Sacramento Republic FC, play in MLS and USLC, respectively. Orlando City entered the tournament in the third round, while Sacramento Republic entered in the second round. It is the first Open Cup final for both teams and the first to feature a non-MLS club since the 2008 final.

=== Orlando City SC ===
| Round | Opponent | Score |
|---|---|---|
| 3rd | Tampa Bay Rowdies (H) | 2–1 |
| R32 | Philadelphia Union (H) | 2–1 |
| R16 | Inter Miami CF (H) | 1–1 (a.e.t.); 4–2 (p) |
| QF | Nashville SC (H) | 1–1 (a.e.t.); 6–5 (p) |
| SF | New York Red Bulls (H) | 5–1 |
Key: (H) = Home; (A) = Away

Orlando City SC (nicknamed the Lions) entered MLS in 2015 as an expansion team, succeeding an earlier second division team that also competed in the U.S. Open Cup. In the 2019 edition, the club advanced to the semifinals for the first time but were eliminated at home by Atlanta United FC, who went on to win the tournament. Orlando City had yet to win a championship in MLS play, finishing as runners-up in the MLS is Back Tournament in 2020 but failing to progress beyond the Conference Semifinals in the MLS Cup Playoffs.

The Lions played their entire 2022 U.S. Open Cup campaign at their home venue, Exploria Stadium in Orlando, having been drawn into high hosting priority in each round. Orlando City entered in the third round alongside most MLS teams and was drawn in the Florida region to play against the Tampa Bay Rowdies of the USLC. The Lions conceded an early goal to the Rowdies, but won 2–1 through a penalty from Alexandre Pato in the 52nd minute and a tap-in goal by Júnior Urso.

Orlando advanced to the Round of 32 in May, where they defeated the Philadelphia Union 2–1 with two goals early in the second half. Ercan Kara opened the scoring in the 54th minute and was followed by Andrés Perea three minutes later; Philadelphia's Stuart Findlay scored a consolation goal in the 77th minute. The Lions faced Florida's other MLS club, Inter Miami CF, in the Round of 16 two weeks later. Following a scoreless draw in regulation, Jean Mota scored with the near-post shot in the 94th minute to give the visitors a lead, but Facundo Torres equalized for Orlando three minutes later with a shot that beat three defenders. The match ended in a 1–1 draw after extra time and was decided in a penalty shootout, which Orlando City won 4–2 following a save from Mason Stajduhar on Bryce Duke and a miss by DeAndre Yedlin.

The Lions then played the other remaining team in the Southeast, Nashville SC of MLS, in the quarterfinal round. Hany Mukhtar scored in the 52nd minute for Nashville to take the lead, but Orlando earned an equalizer through Rodrigo Schlegel in the fourth minute of stoppage time to force extra time, which went on to end in a 1–1 draw. Orlando won the ensuing penalty shootout 6–5, benefitting from a miss by Alex Muyl in the first round and Pedro Gallese's save of a strike by Eric Miller in sudden death. The Lions hosted New York Red Bulls in the semifinals and earned a 5–1 comeback victory. New York's Lewis Morgan scored in the first half stoppage time, but César Araújo equalized off a rebound for Orlando just before half-time. The home side took the lead two minutes into the second half through a strike by Mauricio Pereyra and extended it with Araújo's second goal on a volleyed shot in the 62nd minute. Facundo Torres scored a fourth for the Lions in the 75th minute which was reviewed by the video assistant referee for a potential offside but granted; the final goal was scored seven minutes later by Benji Michel, who was assisted by Torres.

=== Sacramento Republic FC ===
| Round | Opponent | Score |
|---|---|---|
| 2nd | Portland Timbers U23s (H) | 6–0 |
| 3rd | Central Valley Fuego FC (H) | 2–1 |
| R32 | Phoenix Rising FC (H) | 2–0 |
| R16 | San Jose Earthquakes (H) | 2–0 |
| QF | LA Galaxy (A) | 2–1 |
| SF | Sporting Kansas City (H) | 0–0 (a.e.t.); 5–4 (p) |
Key: (H) = Home; (A) = Away

Sacramento Republic FC joined USL Pro, the second-division league now known as the USL Championship (USLC), in 2014 as an expansion team and won the league championship in their inaugural season. The club first participated in the U.S. Open Cup in 2014 and made it as far as the Round of 16 in 2017 and 2018. Republic FC were awarded an MLS expansion team in 2019 that would begin play in 2022, but the bid collapsed after investment was withdrawn in 2021.

Sacramento entered in the second round and hosted the Portland Timbers U23s of USL League Two, who qualified through the open division. Republic FC defeated them 6–0 with six goals in the first half, including a brace from Duke Lacroix. In the next round, Sacramento defeated Central Valley Fuego FC of USL League One 2–1, taking the lead before halftime through a deflection by Dan Casey on a curling shot by captain Rodrigo López. Fuego FC equalized in the 78th minute with a goal by substitute Renato Bustamante but conceded a penalty in stoppage time, which was converted by López.

Republic FC advanced to host fellow USLC club Phoenix Rising FC in the Round of 32 and won 2–0 with goals from Luis Felipe Fernandes and Douglas Martínez off set-pieces. The result left Sacramento as one of three remaining non-MLS teams in the tournament as they were drawn to play the San Jose Earthquakes in the Round of 16. A header from Luis Felipe in the 28th minute and a long-range strike by López in the 84th minute gave Republic FC a 2–0 win over the Earthquakes and a quarterfinal berth.

In the quarterfinals, Sacramento defeated the LA Galaxy 2–1 to continue their Open Cup run and earn their first away victory of the tournament. López scored in the fourth minute, but Republic FC conceded an own goal fourteen minutes later. Several of the Galaxy's starting players were rested for the match but entered in the second half, but were unable to take the lead; the winning goal for Sacramento came from Luis Felipe in the 70th minute. The match came three days after Sacramento had defeated reserve side LA Galaxy II, part of the USLC, in regular season play.

Republic FC then hosted Sporting Kansas City in the semifinals at Heart Health Park with a sellout crowd of 11,569 in attendance. The two sides exchanged 44 shots—31 from Kansas City and 13 from Sacramento—and had several chances to score but were unable to break the 0–0 draw through regulation and extra time. The penalty shootout opened with four rounds of converted shots despite a save from Sacramento goalkeeper Danny Vitiello on William Agada, which was called back and retaken, and a panenka by Maalique Foster for Republic FC. In the fifth round, Vitiello saved MLS veteran Graham Zusi's shot and López converted his to clinch Sacramento's 5–4 shootout victory and a berth in the final.

Sacramento's 2022 Open Cup campaign has seen them defeat teams from four divisions of the United States soccer pyramid. Republic FC are the first lower-division team to play in the U.S. Open Cup final since the Charleston Battery in 2008. They are also the first lower-division team to defeat three MLS teams since the Rochester Raging Rhinos during their successful campaign to win the 1999 U.S. Open Cup. Sacramento's run has also inspired hopes of earning a second MLS expansion bid from a new investor group.

== Venue ==
The 2022 final was played at the 25,500-seat Exploria Stadium, the home venue of Orlando City SC, in Orlando, Florida. The club played all their matches of the tournament at Exploria Stadium, having won hosting priority in each round. Tickets were released to season ticket holders on July 28 and the general public the following day. As of August 2, the supporters' section of the stadium was sold out and 5,000 total tickets remained. A full sellout was announced on August 24.

Sacramento Republic FC organized a free watch party at the Sacramento Convention Center Complex in Downtown Sacramento that was attended by several thousand fans.

== Pre-match ==
=== Spying allegations ===
Prior to the final, Republic FC trained and practiced at Central Winds Park, a public park in Winter Springs, Florida. The club chose to book two fields at the park before training at Exploria Stadium. On September 6, Sacramento filed a complaint with the USSF alleging that an Orlando City SC staffer had spied on the training session held the day before. According to ESPN, the staffer claimed to be meeting a friend at a nearby soccer field but refused to leave after multiple requests from Republic FC staff; the staffer also moved to avoid two vans that were parked to obstruct his view. A fine of an undisclosed amount was issued by the USSF on September 17.

== Match ==
=== Summary ===
The final was watched by 25,527 spectators, including several thousand traveling Sacramento fans. Orlando controlled possession and outshot the visitors in the first half, but were unable to beat Republic FC's defense. In the 75th minute, a turnover from Sacramento defender Dan Casey was collected by Benji Michel and passed to Facundo Torres, who scored from 18 yards. Michel earned a penalty for Orlando five minutes later after a tackle by Casey during a counter-attack. Torres converted the penalty by sending Danny Vitiello the wrong way and gave the hosts a 2–0 lead. In the fifth minute of stoppage time, Torres sent a through-ball to Michel, who ran between two defenders and shot across the goal to score Orlando's third of the final. The match ended in a 3–0 victory for Orlando City, clinching their first U.S. Open Cup title.

=== Details ===
September 7, 2022
8:00 pm EDT

| Orlando City SC (MLS) | 3–0 | Sacramento Republic FC (USLC) |
|---|---|---|
| Torres 75', 80' (pen.); Michel 90+6' | Report |

Exploria Stadium, Orlando, Florida
Attendance: 25,527
Referee: Ramy Touchan

| Orlando City SC | Sacramento Republic FC |

| GK | 1 | (Peru) Pedro Gallese |
| DF | 4 | (Portugal) João Moutinho |
| DF | 15 | (Argentina) Rodrigo Schlegel |
| DF | 25 | (Brazil) Antônio Carlos | (yellow card) 69' |
| DF | 2 | (Brazil) Ruan | | (substituted off) 83' |
| MF | 10 | (Uruguay) Mauricio Pereyra (c) | (yellow card) 90+1' | (substituted off) 90+1' |
| MF | 5 | (Uruguay) César Araújo |
| MF | 11 | (Brazil) Júnior Urso | | (substituted off) 90+1' |
| FW | 77 | (Colombia) Iván Angulo | | (substituted off) 83' |
| FW | 9 | (Austria) Ercan Kara | | (substituted off) 61' |
| FW | 17 | (Uruguay) Facundo Torres |
Substitutes:
| GK | 31 | (United States) Mason Stajduhar |
| DF | 6 | (Sweden) Robin Jansson |
| DF | 24 | (United States) Kyle Smith | | (substituted in) 83' |
| MF | 21 | (United States) Andrés Perea | | (substituted in) 90+1' |
| MF | 16 | (Peru) Wilder Cartagena | | (substituted in) 90+1' |
| FW | 13 | (United States) Benji Michel | | (substituted in) 61' |
| FW | 19 | (Canada) Tesho Akindele | | (substituted in) 83' |
Manager:
(Colombia) Oscar Pareja

| GK | 31 | (United States) Danny Vitiello |
| DF | 4 | (Republic of Ireland) Lee Desmond | (yellow card) 74' |
| DF | 24 | (United States) Conor Donovan | | (substituted off) 88' |
| DF | 5 | (Republic of Ireland) Dan Casey |
| MF | 3 | (Spain) Damià Viader |
| MF | 96 | (United States) Luis Felipe | (yellow card) 77' |
| MF | 20 | (United States) Matt LaGrassa | | (substituted off) 78' |
| MF | 2 | (England) Jack Gurr |
| FW | 8 | (United States) Rodrigo López (c) | (yellow card) 79' |
| FW | 99 | (Jamaica) Maalique Foster | | (substituted off) 78' |
| FW | 7 | (Spain) Keko | | (substituted off) 65' |
Substitutes:
| GK | 1 | (Mexico) Carlos Saldaña |
| DF | 14 | (United States) Duke Lacroix |
| DF | 6 | (United States) Josh Bauer |
| MF | 19 | (Scotland) Nick Ross | | (substituted in) 88' |
| FW | 17 | (Guadeloupe) Luther Archimède | | (substituted in) 78' |
| FW | 42 | (Honduras) Douglas Martínez | | (substituted in) 65' |
| FW | 11 | (Argentina) Emil Cuello | | (substituted in) 78' |
Manager:
(England) Mark Briggs

Man of the Match: Facundo Torres (Orlando City SC)

Assistant referees:
Kevin Klinger
Ian McKay
Fourth official:
Jose Da Silva

Match rules

- 90 minutes
- 30 minutes of extra time if necessary.
- Penalty shootout if scores still tied.
- Seven named substitutes, of which five can be used during three windows and half-time.

== Post-match ==
The 2022 U.S. Open Cup was the first championship clinched by Orlando City since they entered MLS in 2015. As winners of the match, they earned $300,000 in prize money as well as qualification for the 2023 CONCACAF Champions League—their first continental competition. Orlando City are the second Floridian club to win the U.S. Open Cup, having been preceded by the St. Petersburg Kickers in 1989, and the first to participate in the CONCACAF Champions League. As runners-up, Sacramento earned $100,000 as well as a $15,000 bonus as the top team in the tournament from the USL Championship. Both clubs reached the round of 32 in the 2023 edition of the U.S. Open Cup, but were eliminated on the same day.
