= 2022 Orlando City SC season =

Season of American association football team

Orlando City SC
2022 season
- Manager: Óscar Pareja
- Stadium: Exploria Stadium
- MLS: Conference: 7th Overall: 13th
- MLS Cup Playoffs: First round
- U.S. Open Cup: Winners
- Top goalscorer: League: Ercan Kara (11); All: Facundo Torres (13)
- Highest home attendance: 25,527 (September 7 vs. Sacramento Republic, U.S. Open Cup Final)
- Lowest home attendance: League: 14,483 (August 31 vs. Seattle Sounders FC); All: 7,601 (May 10 vs. Philadelphia Union, U.S. Open Cup fourth round)
- Average home league attendance: 17,283
- Biggest win: ORL 5–1 NYRB (Jul. 27); ORL 4–0 TOR (Sep. 17)
- Biggest defeat: PHI 5–1 ORL (Sep. 10)
Home colors	Away colors

The 2022 Orlando City SC season was the club's 12th season of existence in Orlando and eighth season as a Major League Soccer franchise, the top-flight league in the United States soccer league system. The season was highlighted by a first trophy since joining MLS, winning the 2022 U.S. Open Cup with a 3–0 home victory over USL Championship team Sacramento Republic FC. Orlando City also reached the 2022 MLS Cup Playoffs but were eliminated in the first round by CF Montréal.

== Season review ==
=== Pre-season ===
After an evaluation of club structure following their acquisition of the club during the 2021 season, the Wilf family announced the hiring of Jarrod Dillon as president of business operations, a newly created position, on November 30, 2021.

On December 1, 2021, Orlando City announced the club had exercised 11 contract options and declined the contract options of seven players, most notably captain and Designated Player Nani after three seasons. Four players including Orlando's only other DP, Mauricio Pereyra, were out of contract at the end of the 2021 season with all but club-record appearance maker Chris Mueller, who had already agreed a pre-contract with Hibernian in July 2021, in discussions to return. Pereyra re-signed on a one-year deal on December 17 with Pato also later re-signing on a one-year contract on January 15.

On December 6, 2021, it was announced Orlando City's reserve affiliate team Orlando City B would be returning from hiatus for the inaugural 21-team MLS Next Pro season starting in 2022.

With the addition of Charlotte FC in 2022, MLS held an Expansion Draft on December 14, 2021. Orlando was exempt having had Kamal Miller selected in the previous year's expansion draft.

On January 1, Orlando finalized the permanent transfer of Daryl Dike, the club's top goalscorer during the previous season, to English EFL Championship team West Bromwich Albion. The fee was reportedly an initial club-record $9,500,000 plus performance bonuses and a 20% sell-on clause. Six days later, Orlando made their first signing of the season, acquiring Uruguayan midfielder César Araújo from Montevideo Wanderers for a reported $2,000,000. The move was the first Orlando had made under the new MLS U22 initiative launched the previous April which allowed clubs to sign three young players to lucrative contracts at a reduced budget charge.

On January 11, Orlando made three selections in the 2021 MLS SuperDraft, one in each of the three rounds. Only Jack Lynn was signed to a first team contract. Nick Taylor signed with Orlando City B.

On January 24, Orlando made another purchase from Uruguay, this time for new designated player Facundo Torres from Peñarol on a four-year contract. He joined for a reported club record $9,000,000 fee. It broke the previous record of $3,000,000 set by the purchase of Josué Colmán in January 2018. Three days later, Orlando signed another DP: Austrian striker Ercan Kara from Rapid Wien for a reported $800,000. Orlando had acquired an international roster spot from CF Montréal earlier in the week in exchange for $200,000 in 2022 General Allocation Money and the natural third-round pick in the 2023 MLS SuperDraft. Orlando's only other signing in the offseason was 17 year old academy product Alex Freeman.

=== February ===
Having ended the 2021 regular season with a 2–0 victory away at CF Montréal, Orlando opened the 2022 regular season with a 2–0 home victory against the same opposition. Alexandre Pato, who missed the majority of his first season in Orlando with an injury sustained on opening weekend, marked his first start since that day by scoring Orlando's first goal of the season and his first as a Lion early in the second half. Fourth-year homegrown Benji Michel added a second in the 59th minute before Montreal's Romell Quioto was sent off for punching Robin Jansson in the chest in the 66th minute with the Swede also receiving a yellow card for his part in the altercation. Both sides finished the game down to 10 players when Jansson later received a second yellow in the 81st minute for shoulder checking Joaquín Torres on the counter. The result preserved Orlando's opening day unbeaten streak since joining MLS in 2015 (2W 6D 0L).

=== March ===
Orlando's first road game of the season was away to Chicago Fire FC at Soldier Field on March 5. After a goalless first half, Orlando thought they had taken the lead through a long-range Júnior Urso strike in the 73rd minute. As Chicago were about to restart the game, VAR intervened and asked the referee to consult the monitor. After a lengthy 3 minute 40 second stoppage, the referee adjudged Ercan Kara to have controlled the ball with his arm instead of his chest in the build up and disallowed the goal. After the game, head coach Óscar Pareja disputed the clear and obvious nature of the review given it took so long for the video assistant to scrutinize a play the referee was so close to in real time and none of the Chicago players initially appealed, questioning how something as significant as a goal can be overturned without a conclusive angle. The Professional Referee Organization later stated in an analysis of the incident: "PRO does not feel there was enough evidence for the VAR to intervene and would have preferred for the on-field decision to stand." Meanwhile, Urso lamented the physicality of the opposition, claiming they were more interested in fighting than playing after committing 21 fouls and receiving five yellow cards. With another shutout, Pedro Gallese tied Joe Bendik's club-record 13 all-time in 49 appearances compared to Bendik's 92. He also became the first Orlando City goalkeeper to keep three successive clean sheets in regular season play dating back to the final game of the previous season. On March 12, Orlando welcomed the visit of FC Cincinnati, a team on a 14-game losing streak stretching back to September 15, 2021, and without a goal through the opening two games. Brandon Vazquez gave the visitors an early 13th-minute lead having been played in on goal by Luciano Acosta. Having had a goal disallowed the previous week, Júnior Urso scored his first goal of the season, heading home a Facundo Torres cross to level the scores before the break. Despite outshooting the opposition 18 to 9, Orlando were dealt their first defeat of the season as Vazquez scored the only goal of the second half when Dominique Badji shrugged off Ruan before firing in a cross for Vazquez to glance past Gallese. Cincinnati goalkeeper Alec Kann recorded five saves. Roles reversed in the next match as Orlando traveled to LA Galaxy and were forced to soak up pressure, conceding 63% possession and 20 shots although only three were on target. The Lions made Galaxy's wastefulness pay, taking all three points as Facundo Torres scored his first goal for Orlando, finishing off a swift 9th minute attack, one of six shots Orlando had in the game. A third clean sheet in the opening four games meant Pedro Gallese moved past Bendik outright for the club's clean sheet record. It also marked the team's first win in California at the seventh attempt since joining MLS in 2015. Orlando ended March with a second consecutive weekend playing out west, this time against Portland Timbers. It was the first meeting between the teams since the MLS is Back Tournament Final. Short-handed through the loss of Pedro Gallese, Sebas Méndez and Facundo Torres during a FIFA international window, the game saw Mason Stajduhar deputize in goal. After an even but goalless first half with few clear cut chances, Orlando struck early in the second half as Alexandre Pato lifted to ball into the Portland penalty area for Urso to take a touch and pick his spot. Having picked up a yellow card for wrestling Pato the floor five minutes earlier, Josecarlos Van Rankin was dismissed in the 76th minute for a second yellow on Pato after cynically tugging the Brazilian back. Despite the man advantage, Orlando quickly found themselves level just four minutes after the sending off when substitute Andrés Perea tripped Cristhian Paredes in the box; the Paraguayan calmly rolling the resultant penalty kick down the middle past Stajduhar. Although both teams carved out good chances in the closing minutes, neither found a winner as the game finished 1–1.

=== April ===
Orlando began April by hosting Los Angeles FC. Having lost starting central defender Antônio Carlos to injury in the 18th minute, the Lions' defense struggled to hold up, conceding two first half goals from two Ruan lapses. However, the teams went into the break level as Orlando hit back twice: first through a volley from Pato who had earlier had a goal narrowly called offside before João Moutinho, who had been drafted by LAFC in 2018 and notably scored his only other Orlando City goal against his former club in 2020, was picked out alone in the box and found the bottom corner. A dart from the top of the box by Ilie Sánchez gave LAFC their third lead of the evening early in the second half and, despite having had their goal peppered by shots forcing Maxime Crépeau into some acrobatic saves, made the points safe in stoppage time when Kwadwo Opoku eventually scrambled the ball home as the visitors hit with numbers on the counter. It was announced on April 7 that Antônio Carlos would be ruled out for 12 to 16 weeks with the hamstring injury he had sustained during the match although he did not need surgery. The Lions remained at home the following week for the visit of the as yet undefeated Chicago Fire FC on April 9. The teams had already met five weeks earlier to play out a goalless draw in Chicago. The home side benefited from a numerical advantage as Brian Gutiérrez, the teenage replacement for the injured Xherdan Shaqiri, was sent off for two first-half yellows: one for cynically blocking the taking of a freekick in the fifth minute, something Fire head coach Ezra Hendrickson later called "inexcusable" and "a learning moment," before being dismissed after stepping across Araújo to prevent a breakaway in the 43rd minute. A man up, Orlando dominated possession and ended the game with 21 shots in total but were largely wasteful, only running out 1–0 winners as offseason DP signing Ercan Kara scored his first goal for the club. It came just before the hour mark from a well worked freekick as Pato peeled away to the back post, heading the ball back across goal and into the path of the waiting Austrian. Orlando earned a second consecutive shutout victory, the first time the team had won back to back games without conceding since June 2015, on the road at Columbus Crew the following weekend. Columbus looked dangerous in the first half hour as Derrick Etienne saw a close range effort blocked by Kyle Smith and Lucas Zelarayán hit the crossbar from a freekick but Orlando grew into the game and eventually found the lead as Rodrigo Schlegel scored his first goal for the club, finishing from inside the six-yard box on a recycled set piece in the 37th minute. Orlando's second came in the 51st minute as Pereyra, Torres and Kara strung a tiki-taka passing sequence together to pick their way through the Crew defense culminating in Kara powerfully striking past Eloy Room on the swivel. With a two-goal lead, the Lions largely controlled the second half to see out the game. Thomas Williams made his debut in stoppage time. At 17 years, 245 days old, he broke the previous youngest first-team appearance record of 18 years, 127 days set by Michael Halliday in the previous season. With the return of the U.S. Open Cup for the first time since 2019, Orlando entered in the third round and were drawn against rivals Tampa Bay Rowdies of the USL Championship. The Lions had won all six previous competitive meetings as a USL Pro franchise: once in the 2013 Walt Disney World Pro Soccer Classic, once in the 2014 Open Cup third round, and four times in the two-legged preseason I-4 Derby tournament. Pareja fielded a fairly strong lineup but took the opportunity to hand starts to the likes of Stajduhar, Smith, Williams, Perea and van der Water who had started the season as backups. After a lackluster first half, Orlando made three halftime changes including Pereyra who played Michel in behind the Tampa defense to see Aarón Guillén drag him down for a penalty. Pato converted to give Orlando a 52nd-minute lead which was doubled when Pereyra's chipped pass fell to Urso six yards out ten minutes later. The Rowdies retaliated immediately and scrambled a goal back through Lucky Mkosana but struggled to trouble the Orlando goal again as they pushed for an equalizer and saw head coach Neill Collins, who received a yellow card in the first half for dissent, sent off in stoppage time for running on to the pitch to retrieve the ball and had to watch the last moments of his team's 2022 cup run from the stands. The fourth round draw was conducted the following day, pairing Orlando with Philadelphia Union who were a new entrant for the fourth round as one of the eight highest seeded MLS teams from the previous season. Orlando returned to MLS play on April 24 and were beaten by a club-record equalling three goal margin at home for only the fourth time as New York Red Bulls dominated in a 3–0 victory for the visitors. Orlando closed out April hosting new expansion team Charlotte FC. The Lions took a two-goal lead into halftime with Ruan breaking the deadlock in the 16th minute having made a late run at the back post to meet a Michel pull back before wheeling off to the sideline to celebrate by donning a Flash mask in recognition of his nickname. He showed the speed that earned him the nickname for the second goal in first half stoppage time, sprinting away on the counter before unselfishly playing in Torres for a tap in, his second goal of the season. The visitors pulled one back on the hour mark via a Christian Fuchs penalty after Alan Franco split the defense and was brought down but Orlando held on for all three points.

=== May ===
On May 5, Orlando acquired a natural first round pick in the 2023 MLS SuperDraft, $500,000 in General Allocation Money, Discovery Priority to an unnamed player from Chicago Fire FC as well as a potential additional $150,000 in General Allocation Money for performance-based conditions and a percentage of any future transfer fee in exchange for the MLS priority to former Lions forward Chris Mueller who was returning to MLS as a free agent after four months with Hibernian. Later that day, Orlando acquired Jake Mulraney in a trade with Atlanta United FC in exchange for $200,000 in General Allocation Money with a potential further $75,000 in GAM pending performance-based conditions. The club also announced the signing of Gastón González from Unión Santa Fe as an U22 initiative player on a three-year contract although he was immediately placed on the Season Ending Injury list having torn his ACL in what was scheduled to be his final appearance for Unión on April 19. The team's first match in May was a bruising 4–1 defeat to CF Montréal who jumped Orlando to move third in the conference. The hosts dominated the first half but only held a one-goal lead through Joel Waterman before doubling it through Djordje Mihailovic on the counter shortly after the restart. Orlando pulled one back when Moutinho headed home a corner but Montreal piled on two late goals in the closing stages through man of the match Joaquín Torres and Zachary Brault-Guillard. Three days later, the Lions returned to US Open Cup action, hosting Philadelphia Union, one of eight MLS teams to begin at this stage. The deadlock wasn't broken until the 54th minute when Kara pounced on a loose ball in the box before Andrés Perea's 30-yard laser three minutes later doubled the lead. The Union found a consolation goal from a recycled freekick but Orlando held out to progress to the round of 16. Returning to Canada for a consecutive weekend, Orlando stole all three points from Toronto FC as a game high in chances (Orlando outshot Toronto 17–8) was goalless until second-half stoppage time when Kyle Smith glance home the winner from a corner. On May 22, Orlando played 2021 expansion franchise Austin FC for the first time having not met the previous season. The Lions took an early lead at Q2 Stadium when goalkeeper Brad Stuver gifted Orlando possession and Ercan Kara capitalized with a simple tap in before Ruan doubled the lead in the 22nd minute. The game changed when referee Joseph Dickerson intervened, first showing two yellow cards to Schlegel within minutes of each other for handballs with the second gifting Austin a penalty which was scored by Sebastián Driussi. Dickerson then went to VAR to send off Araújo for kicking out at Alexander Ring in the 69th minute. Despite the numerical disadvantage, Orlando held on to the lead until stoppage time when Dickerson inexplicably awarded Austin a corner which Moussa Djitté found a 90+5th-minute equalizer from. After the game, Óscar Pareja called the officiating "unbelievable," claiming Dickerson had given Austin the game with the questionable awarding of a penalty and sending off of Schlegel, and the decision to incorrectly give Austin the corner the equalizer came from. Off the back of an emotional draw, Orlando hosted Inter Miami in the US Open Cup Round of 16 three days later. Goalless in regulation, Miami took the lead in extra-time but were immediately pegged back by Facundo Torres. Level after 120 minutes, Orlando prevailed in the penalty shootout as all four Lions scored while Mason Stajduhar made a stop on Bryce Duke and DeAndre Yedlin shot over the bar. Orlando played their sixth and final game of a busy month on May 28 as Pareja's former club, FC Dallas, came to town. Kara headed Orlando in to the lead in first half stoppage time, connecting with a Pereyra freekick. Dallas mounted a comeback led by Paul Arriola, scoring three unanswered goals in the second half to take the victory. Both teams wore Adidas x Parley for the Oceans jerseys made from recycled materials which also included remembrance patches to honor the victims of the Robb Elementary School shooting which had happened in Uvalde, Texas earlier that week.

=== June ===
After a two-week international FIFA break, Orlando returned to action on June 15 away at New England Revolution. Goalkeeper Gallese notably started the match despite playing in Peru's World Cup qualification playoff shootout defeat to Australia two days earlier in Qatar. The game finished 1–1 as both teams scored in the first half: Carles Gil gave New England the lead, curling a shot from outside the box past Gallese in the 22nd minute before Jansson struck back, recycling a cleared corner and firing low between the legs of Djordje Petrović in the 35th minute. Orlando returned home three days later to host Houston Dynamo, claiming a 2–1 victory off the back of a Kara brace. The opener saw all three designated players combine when Pereyra played in Torres to cut back to Kara who slid the ball in to the goal. The Lions doubled their lead in the second half when a fierce Pereyra shot deflected off the heels of Kara to wrong-foot Steve Clark. Houston halved the deficit less than two minutes later, Sebastián Ferreira cushioned a header in to the bottom corner. Both teams hit the woodwork before Kara and Michel missed gilt-edged chances. Houston piled on the pressure looking for an equalizer, momentarily thinking they found one in the final minute of stoppage time via a Darwin Quintero bicycle kick but the linesman quickly flagged for offside, denying Houston a late point. All MLS teams wore commemorative Juneteenth jersey numbers during the weekend's games. On June 24, Orlando played away at FC Cincinnati without key players such Pereyra as well as three starting defenders; Carlos (long-term injury), Jansson (yellow card accumulation) and Moutinho (injured in warm-up). Defensively unsettled, Gallese made a spectacular eight saves, earning him a place as a substitute in the MLS team of the week despite the Lions succumbing to a 1–0 defeat as Brenner capitalized on a rebound after Gallese saved a Luciano Acosta shot. Three days later, Orlando returned to U.S. Open Cup play to finish off June at home to Nashville SC in the quarter-finals. A slow first half gave way to a chaotic second: Hany Mukhtar gave the visitors the lead in the 52nd minute with a far post tap in as Schlegel was too busy playing the man to deal with a seemingly harmless Alex Muyl cross. Schlegel turned hero in second half stoppage time, instinctively swinging his foot at a knock down from a freekick, sending the game in to extra-time. Referee Mark Allatin brandished 13 yellow cards to players, 10 of which went to Nashville, with all but one coming after halftime. The flurry of cards ultimately led to the dismissal of Sean Davis who earned a second yellow in the opening minute of extra-time for dragging down Torres on the counter. Despite the numerical advantage, Orlando could not break the deadlock and the game was decided by a penalty shoot-out. Muyl shot over and Perea had his saved by Elliot Panicco as the kicks went to two rounds of sudden death before Gallese made the stop on Eric Miller to secure the Lions' progress.

=== July ===
After going the full 120 minutes in the Open Cup, Orlando had four days rest before returning to MLS action on the Fourth of July, hosting D.C. United. The game tied the club record for highest scoring game as Orlando lost 5–3. Taxiarchis Fountas scored a brace inside the opening 10 minutes, twice taking advantage of a disjointed Orlando defence failing to pick him up in the penalty box. He secured his hat-trick early in the second half off a freekick fired low to Gallese's right through the wall. Orlando battled back to within a goal first through substitute Torres who then got the assist as Kara rose to meet his freekick. D.C.'s two-goal lead was briefly restored by a breaking Kimarni Smith before Pato pulled the Lions back to within a goal from the penalty spot. Despite forcing Rafael Romo into some impressive saves, Orlando could not equalize before D.C. secured the win in stoppage time through Nigel Robertha. Five days later, the Lions hosted intra-state rivals Inter Miami CF, taking the victory on a 90+2-minute own goal from Damion Lowe, the first time a one-goal game had been decided by a stoppage time own goal in MLS history. Next on the slate was two road trips in the space of five days, away to Colorado Rapids on July 13 and Atlanta United FC on July 23. Orlando drew both games 1–1 having held the lead in both at half-time as the team struggled to build on leads and see out games defensively. Gallese was named to MLS team of the week for his six-save performance against Colorado before making a further three in Atlanta including a spectacular leaping stop on former-Lion Dom Dwyer. Three days later, Orlando hosted a friendly against English Premier League team Arsenal who were taking part in the 2022 Florida Cup as part of their preseason tour. Having conceded early to Gabriel Martinelli, a largely full strength Orlando held Arsenal 1–1 at the break before eventually falling 3–1. With three first-team departures; selling Silvester van der Water to Cambuur, Matheus Aias to Racing Santander and most notably, trading Ecuador international Sebas Méndez to Los Angeles FC; On July 20, Orlando completed the free transfer Nicholas Gioacchini, a forward with eight caps for the United States who had most recently spent the 2021–22 season in France with first division Montpellier, on loan from Caen. On July 23, Orlando hosted Philadelphia Union in league play. The visitors won 1–0, scoring with their only shot on goal. On the end of a flick on from a corner, Dániel Gazdag had originally been called offside. But despite no definitive angle to overturn the decision, referee Alex Chilowicz decided to award the goal after consulting VAR in the 39th minute. Despite a barrage of crosses, Philadelphia hang on and were relieved to once again be on the right side of refereeing controversy when, in second half stoppage time, Gazdag appeared to pull down Antônio Carlos by his shirt in the penalty area, preventing him from reaching a header on a corner. Chilowicz was sent to the monitor but, after consulting the replays, opted against awarding Orlando a penalty and instead motioned that Carlos had dived. However, when questioned later by reporters, he instead claimed he had determined Carlos had pulled on Gazdag's shirt and awarded a foul. Coach Paeja called the decision "incredible... It frustrated us all." With only one win in their last seven matches in all competitions, Orlando entered July 27's U.S. Open Cup semi-final against New York Red Bulls, a team sat 3rd-place in the East, in poor form. The Lions had only reached the semi-final stage once before, in 2019, ending in a 2–0 defeat to Atlanta United. On a rain-soaked night, an even but open first half saw the deadlock broken by the visitors in stoppage-time as Lewis Morgan arrived at the far post to fire a fierce strike past Gallese. Orlando responded immediately, going on the attack and forcing an equalizer on a corner when offseason signing César Araújo reacted to a rebound to score his first ever senior career goal. After a flurry of action to end a tight first half tied at 1–1, Orlando took the lead less than two minutes after the break as Pereyra stabbed Moutinho's pull-back past a helpless Carlos Coronel. Araújo doubed the lead with his second career goal on 62 minutes, again capitalizing on a loose ball from a corner. Growing increasingly dominant, Orlando piled on two more goals through Torres and Michel to run out emphatic 5–1 winners and send the team to its first Open Cup final, to be held at Exploria Stadium in September. Orlando ended July by returning to MLS action on the road at D.C. United, featuring Wayne Rooney on his coaching debut for the team he had scored two goals and three assists for in three appearances against Orlando during his brief MLS stint. The Lions took the lead early through Urso and looked to be seeing out the game before capitulating, conceding twice in second-half stoppage time to fall to a 2–1 defeat.

=== August ===
Orlando's run of league games without a win extended to five matches as New England Revolution visited Exploria Stadium on August 6 to inflict a third successive MLS defeat on the Lions as the visitors cruised to a comfortable 3–0 win. The result dropped Orlando below the playoff line for the first time since March 12. The winless streak ended on August 13 when Orlando visited New York Red Bulls. Despite New York creating the majority of the chances, outshooting the visitors 15 to two, it was Torres who scored the only goal of the game, squeezing a shot from a narrow angle underneath Coronel and in off the post. Gallese's eighth clean sheet of the season set a new club single-season record. The team won back to back league games for the first time since April the following week, traveling to Charlotte FC for the first time and winning 2-1. DP striker Kara returned from injury after two games out and opened the scoring after Urso picked him out ghosting in behind the Charlotte defensive line in the 62nd minute only for Charlotte to respond four minutes later through a powerful McKinze Gaines header. Substitute Akindele grabbed his first goal of the season on his 23rd appearance, breaking away on the counter and burying the rebound after his first shot was parried by goalkeeper Kristijan Kahlina to claim all three points as the Lions moved up to 5th place. Akindele again provided late heroics the following week as Orlando beat New York City FC at home 2–1 with a 90+6th-minute winner. Urso had given Orlando an early 7th-minute lead with an emphatic volley after a give and go with Torres. Shortly after VAR had intervened to rescind an Antônio Carlos red card, NYCFC capitalized on a turnover in midfield, slicing open the Orlando back line for Maxi Moralez to run in behind and score. Summer signing Iván Angulo registered his first assist from a corner as the Lions claimed all three points at the death with Akindele flicking a near post header on and past Sean Johnson. Three days later, on August 31, Orlando hosted Western Conference strugglers Seattle Sounders FC. In a game delayed by weather by nearly two hours, Albert Rusnák gave Seattle a halftime lead, perfectly whipping a freekick over the wall, between Gallese and the goalpost. Orlando had the chance to level when Nicholas Gioacchini won a penalty but captain Pereyra was denied by Stefan Frei in the 32nd minute having previously failed to convert his only other non-shootout penalty for Orlando in July 2021. Raúl Ruidíaz doubled the lead early in the second half, as Jordan Morris steamed past Schlegel before crossing with Ruidíaz bumbling the ball past Gallese at the second attempt in the 52nd minute. Orlando responded in 93 seconds courtesy of Torres who was found by Moutinho at the top of the box. The Lions were level by the 68th minute when Morris committed a handball in the box and this time Kara stepped up to convert the penalty, tying the game. Orlando claimed a fourth consecutive MLS victory and third in the final minutes, when Kyle Smith chopped inside off the right and fired a speculative left-footed shot which deflected in off Seattle defender Jackson Ragen. Initially called offside on Kara, referee Alex Chilowicz awarded the goal after consulting VAR and deemed the Austrian to not be active during the play.

=== September ===
On September 7, Orlando City won the 2022 U.S. Open Cup, winning 3–0 against USL Championship side Sacramento Republic in the final. It was the first trophy the Lions had won in their MLS era having last won the 2014 Commissioner's Cup and marked the first time a team from outside the top division of American soccer had contested a final since Charleston Battery did so in 2008. Despite controlling the first half and peppering the Sacramento goal, Orlando had to wait until midway through the second half to open the scoring through Torres in the 75th minute when Angulo pressed Dan Casey into turning the ball over. Torres then doubled the lead from the penalty spot five minutes later when Casey slid in and took out Orlando City homegrown Benji Michel who himself added a third in stoppage time, rolling the ball into the bottom corner as Sacramento once again paid for giving up possession in their own half. On the back of the Open Cup win, the Lions traveled to Eastern Conference leaders Philadelphia Union three days later. Pareja made six changes to the lineup including a second MLS appearance of the season for backup goalkeeper Mason Stajduhar. By halftime the Union led Orlando by two goals courtesy of a Moutinho own goal that looped high over Stajduhar and then Mikael Uhre who caught the Lions on the counter. Dániel Gazdag added a third early in the second half from the penalty spot when Stajduhar fumbled a cross and was adjudged to have taken Uhre down trying to recover. Alejandro Bedoya added another with a stooping header before Orlando pulled one back in the 75th minute as Perea found the top corner from the top of the box. The game finished 5–1 after Jack Elliott scored Philadelphia's fifth from a corner in the closing minutes, handing Orlando their biggest loss of the season. A second consecutive defeat followed four days later as Orlando fell to a 1–0 defeat at home to Atlanta United FC. Despite outshooting the visitors 20–10, the Lions' wastefulness was punished when Thiago Almada scored the only goal of the game, playing a give and go off Andrew Gutman before dribbling his way past Carlos to leave himself one on one with Gallese. It marked the first time Atlanta won back to back games in 2022. Although remaining in 5th place after the defeat, Cincinnati's 6–0 victory over San Jose the previous weekend meant the teams were level on 42 points with four games left to play each. After back to back defeats, Orlando registered a first win since the Open Cup final on September 17, beating Toronto FC 4–0 at home to sweep the Canadian side in 2022. The Lions scored early through Torres cutting inside from the right wing and firing past Quentin Westberg from outside the box. The lead was doubled in the 22nd minute when Pereyra played a through ball behind the Toronto defence to find the onrushing Kara. Shortly after the break, Lukas MacNaughton scored an own goal, turning a Moutinho cross into his own net for a third goal and Orlando's largest winning margin of the season was equaled six minutes from time through substitute Akindele. Orlando City became the first team in MLS history to have at least one 10-goal scorer in each of the club's first eight regular seasons with Ercan Kara's 10th goal of the campaign.

=== October ===
Orlando entered the final month of the regular season in 6th place, having dropped one point behind FC Cincinnati following Cincy's tie with Seattle Sounders on September 27, level on points with Inter Miami in the final playoff spot, and three points ahead of Columbus Crew and the playoff line. A 2–1 defeat to New York City FC at Red Bull Arena on October 2, inflicted in the 81st minute by Talles Magno strike, clinched a home playoff game for NYCFC and interim head coach Nick Cushing while setting up a win and in scenario against in-state rivals Miami for Orlando with two games remaining. Two days later, Orlando traveled to Fort Lauderdale but had the worst possible start, conceding in 35 seconds when Leonardo Campana outsprinted Carlos and Schlegel to a loose ball and chipped Gallese from 35 yards. Gonzalo Higuaín added one either side of half time and including from the penalty spot when referee Victor Rivas adjudged Ruan to have handballed when the ball flicked up and rolled across his upper arm from close range. Ariel Lassiter added a fourth before Kara netted a consolation in a 4–1 defeat.

==== Decision Day ====
All Eastern Conference games kicked off at 2:30 p.m. ET with Orlando City v Columbus Crew selected to be nationally televised on Fox Sports 1 and Fox Deportes. At the start of the day Orlando sat in 8th, one point below the playoff line and decision day opponents Columbus as well as FC Cincinnati. A win would leapfrog the Lions above the Crew and secure a postseason berth while a draw would rely on Cincinnati losing against bottom-of-the-table D.C. United with the Lions holding the tiebreaker between the two. In the first half, both teams were limited to few opportunities but Columbus went into the break with a one-goal lead when Lucas Zelarayán drew four defenders before playing in a free Derrick Etienne who slotted past Gallese. With FC Cincinnati holding a comfortable 4–1 lead at D.C. United at the half, Orlando knew only a win would put the team in the playoffs. Urso got the Lions back level in the 56th minute with a smart turn and shot. The game was decided in the 84th minute when Facundo Torres converted a penalty to secure a 2–1 victory and send Orlando to the postseason. Appeals for the penalty had originally been ignored by referee Alex Chilowicz but, after VAR recommended he go to the monitor, a quick review confirmed Miloš Degenek had blocked a fierce Benji Michel shot with an outstretched arm and the spot kick awarded. Having dropped out of the playoffs, Columbus head coach Caleb Porter was fired after the match.

=== Playoffs ===
For the third consecutive season, Orlando qualified for the MLS Cup Playoffs under the stewardship of Óscar Pareja. Entering as the #7 seed, Orlando traveled to #2 CF Montréal in the first round. The Lions bowed out of the 2022 season with a 2–0 defeat. The game lacked any real offensive quality with Orlando failing to register a shot on target while Montreal scored with their only two shots on target. It took until the 68th minute for the hosts to break the deadlock when some neat interplay between Kei Kamara and Djordje Mihailovic opened up space for Ismaël Koné to steal into the box and score. A Moutinho trip on Mihailovic deep in stoppage time gifted Montreal a penalty to seal the win.

== Roster ==
Last updated on September 16, 2022

No.	Nationality	Name	Position(s)	Date of birth (age)	Previous club	Notes
Goalkeepers
1	(Peru)	Pedro Gallese	GK	February 23, 1990 (aged 32)	(Mexico) Veracruz	INT
31	(United States)	Mason Stajduhar	GK	December 2, 1997 (aged 24)	(United States) Orlando City U-23	HGP
40	(United States)	Adam Grinwis	GK	April 21, 1992 (aged 29)	(United States) Sacramento Republic	–
Defenders
2	(Brazil)	Ruan	RB	May 29, 1995 (aged 26)	(Brazil) Barra da Tijuca	INT
4	(Portugal)	João Moutinho	LB	January 12, 1998 (aged 24)	(United States) Los Angeles FC	GA
6	(Sweden)	Robin Jansson	CB	November 15, 1991 (aged 30)	(Sweden) AIK	–
15	(Argentina)	Rodrigo Schlegel	CB	April 3, 1997 (aged 24)	(Argentina) Racing Club	INT
24	(United States)	Kyle Smith	RB	January 9, 1992 (aged 30)	(United States) Louisville City	–
25	(Brazil)	Antônio Carlos	CB	March 7, 1993 (aged 28)	(Brazil) Palmeiras	INT
26	(United States)	Michael Halliday	RB	January 22, 2003 (aged 19)	(United States) Orlando City B	HGP
30	(United States)	Alex Freeman	RB	August 9, 2004 (aged 17)	(United States) Orlando City Academy	HGP
68	(United States)	Thomas Williams	CB	August 15, 2004 (aged 17)	(United States) Orlando City B	HGP
Midfielders
5	(Uruguay)	César Araújo	CM	April 2, 2001 (aged 20)	(Uruguay) Montevideo Wanderers	U22, INT
10	(Uruguay)	Mauricio Pereyra	AM	March 15, 1990 (aged 31)	(Russia) FC Krasnodar	DP, INT
11	(Brazil)	Júnior Urso	CM	March 10, 1989 (aged 32)	(Brazil) Corinthians	INT
16	(Peru)	Wilder Cartagena	DM	September 23, 1994 (aged 27)	(United Arab Emirates) Al-Ittihad Kalba	INT, Loan in
21	(United States)	Andrés Perea	CM	November 14, 2000 (aged 21)	(Colombia) Atlético Nacional	U22
23	(Republic of Ireland)	Jake Mulraney	LM	April 5, 1996 (aged 25)	(United States) Atlanta United FC	INT
34	(Jamaica)	Joey DeZart	DM	June 9, 1998 (aged 23)	(United States) Wake Forest Demon Deacons	–
Forwards
7	(Brazil)	Alexandre Pato	CF	September 2, 1989 (aged 32)	(Brazil) São Paulo	INT
9	(Austria)	Ercan Kara	CF	January 3, 1996 (aged 26)	(Austria) Rapid Wien	DP, INT
13	(Canada)	Tesho Akindele	CF	March 31, 1992 (aged 29)	(United States) FC Dallas	–
17	(Uruguay)	Facundo Torres	LW	April 13, 2000 (aged 21)	(Uruguay) Peñarol	DP, INT
19	(United States)	Benji Michel	RW	October 23, 1997 (aged 24)	(United States) Portland Pilots	HGP
20	(United States)	Nicholas Gioacchini	CF	July 25, 2000 (aged 21)	(France) Caen	–
22	(Argentina)	Gastón González	LW	June 27, 2001 (aged 20)	(Argentina) Unión Santa Fe	INT, SEI
77	(Colombia)	Iván Angulo	LW	March 22, 1999 (aged 22)	(Brazil) Palmeiras	INT, Loan in

== Staff ==
Executive
Majority owner and chairman	(United States) Mark Wilf
Majority owner and vice-chair	(United States) Zygi Wilf
Majority owner and vice-chair	(United States) Leonard Wilf
President of business operations	(United States) Jarrod Dillon
General manager	(Brazil) Luiz Muzzi
Technical director	(Brazil) Ricardo Moreira
Coaching staff
Head coach	(Colombia) Óscar Pareja
Assistant coach	(Argentina) Josema Bazán
Assistant coach	(Mexico) Diego Torres Ortiz
Strength and conditioning coach	(Argentina) Fabian Bazán
Goalkeeping coach	(Venezuela) César Baena

== Competitions ==
=== Friendlies ===
Orlando City preseason opened on January 18. Seven friendly matches were scheduled, all to played behind closed doors. The New York City FC scrimmage scheduled for January 23 was later canceled. On January 28, Orlando announced the friendly against Colorado would no longer be played behind closed doors and instead be open to the public. On April 19, it was announced Orlando City would host a game against Premier League side Arsenal on their preseason tour on July 20 as part of the "FC Series" expansion of the Florida Cup.

January 23 Preseason	Orlando City	Canceled	New York City FC
Note: Closed-door scrimmage

February 3 Preseason	Orlando City	4–5	Minnesota United FC	Orlando, Florida
2:00 pm	Michel 2'; Freeman 58'; Akindele 72' (pen.); Lynn 76'	Report	Danladi 9'; Reynoso 22'; Hayes 23'; Trapp 55'; Iwe 79'	Stadium: Exploria Stadium
Note: Closed-door scrimmage

February 5 Preseason	Orlando City	0–1	FC Dallas	Kissimmee, Florida
11:00 am		Report	Servania 32'	Stadium: Osceola County Stadium
Note: Closed-door scrimmage

February 11 Preseason	Orlando City	1–1	Colorado Rapids	Orlando, Florida
7:00 pm	Jansson 3'	Report	Rubio 45'	Stadium: Exploria Stadium

February 16 Preseason	Orlando City	0–0	Miami FC	Kissimmee, Florida
2:00 pm		Report		Stadium: Osceola County Stadium
Note: Closed-door scrimmage

February 18 Preseason	Orlando City	2–2	FC Cincinnati	Orlando, Florida
1:15 pm	Pato 53'; Akindele 90+2'	Report	Acosta 25', 77'	Stadium: Exploria Stadium
Note: Closed-door scrimmage

February 19 Preseason	Orlando City	3–1	Tampa Bay Rowdies	Florida
1:00 pm	Akindele 36'; Pereyra 44' (pen.); Lynn 55'	Report	LaCava 21'	Stadium: Undisclosed
Note: Closed-door scrimmage

July 20 Florida Cup	Orlando City	1–3	Arsenal	Orlando, Florida
8:30 pm	Jansson (yellow card) 13'; Torres 29'; Smith (yellow card) 61'; Ruan (yellow card) 90+3'	Report	Holding (yellow card) 2'; Martinelli 5'; Maitland-Niles (yellow card) 19'; Nketiah 66'; Nelson 80'	Stadium: Exploria Stadium; Attendance: 19,738; Referee: Kevin Broadley

=== Major League Soccer ===
Outside of the club, Charlotte FC joined the league as an expansion franchise, bringing the total number of MLS clubs to 28. Orlando's first meeting with Charlotte will be at home on April 30 with the first away trip on August 21. Orlando will also play 2021 expansion franchise Austin FC for the first time on May 22 on the road, having not met during the previous season. The Lions were not scheduled to face six Western Conference teams during the 2022 regular season: Sporting Kansas City, Minnesota United, Nashville SC, Real Salt Lake, San Jose Earthquakes and Vancouver Whitecaps. The top seven teams from each conference will qualify for the playoffs.

Results summary

Overall								Home						Away					
Pld	W	D	L	GF	GA	GD	Pts	W	D	L	GF	GA	GD	W	D	L	GF	GA	GD
34	14	6	14	44	53	−9	48	9	0	8	26	28	−2	5	6	6	18	25	−7

Last updated: October 9.
Source: Match reports

Round	1	2	3	4	5	6	7	8	9	10	11	12	13	14	15	16	17	18	19	20	21	22	23	24	25	26	27	28	29	30	31	32	33	34
Stadium	H	A	H	A	A	H	H	A	H	H	A	A	A	H	A	H	A	H	H	A	A	H	A	H	A	A	H	H	A	H	H	A	A	H
Result	W	D	L	W	D	L	W	W	L	W	L	W	D	L	D	W	L	L	W	D	D	L	L	L	W	W	W	W	L	L	W	L	L	W
Position (Note: ORL's position at the end of the matchweek, not their match.)	5	4	8	5	4	6	2	2	3	3	4	4	3	5	5	4	5	6	5	5	5	5	5	8	7	5	5	5	5	5	5	6	8	7

Updated to match(es) played on October 9. Source: Match reports
A = Away; H = Home; W = Win; D = Draw; L = Loss

Results

February 27 1	Orlando City	2–0	CF Montréal	Orlando, Florida
1:00 pm	Pato 49'; Araújo (yellow card) 56'; Michel 59'; Jansson (yellow card) 67' (yellow-red card) 81'; Moutinho (yellow card) 85'	Report	Quioto (red card) 66'; Wanyama (yellow card) 87'; Waterman (yellow card) 90+4'; J. Torres (yellow card) 90+5'	Stadium: Exploria Stadium; Attendance: 21,283; Referee: Marcos DeOliveira

March 5 2	Chicago Fire FC	0–0	Orlando City	Chicago, Illinois
6:00 pm	Herbers (yellow card) 12'; M. Navarro (yellow card) 63'; Durán (yellow card) 79'; Sekulić (yellow card) 81'; Giménez (yellow card) 90+3'	Report	Araújo (yellow card) 90'; Gallese (yellow card) 90+3'	Stadium: Soldier Field; Attendance: 25,477; Referee: Ismir Pekmic

March 12 3	Orlando City	1–2	FC Cincinnati	Orlando, Florida
7:30 pm	Urso 42', (yellow card) 73'; Jansson (yellow card) 58'; Carlos (yellow card) 81'	Report	Vazquez 13', 53', (yellow card) 37'; Blackett (yellow card) 61'; Kubo (yellow card) 63'; Kann (yellow card) 90+2'	Stadium: Exploria Stadium; Attendance: 16,512; Referee: Chris Penso

March 19 4	LA Galaxy	0–1	Orlando City	Carson, California
3:30 pm		Report	Torres 9'; Ruan (yellow card) 44'; Moutinho (yellow card) 70'; Araújo (yellow card) 90+3'	Stadium: Dignity Health Sports Park; Attendance: 25,174; Referee: Alex Chilowicz

March 27 5	Portland Timbers	1–1	Orlando City	Portland, Oregon
4:00 pm	Bravo (yellow card) 65'; Van Rankin (yellow card) 71' (yellow-red card) 76'; Paredes 80' (pen.), (yellow card) 81'; Bodily (yellow card) 90+4'	Report	Urso 52'; Michel (yellow card) 90+4'; Jansson (yellow card) 90+5'	Stadium: Providence Park; Attendance: 22,948; Referee: Marcos de Oliveira

April 2 6	Orlando City	2–4	Los Angeles FC	Orlando, Florida
7:30 pm	Araújo (yellow card) 31'; Pato 36'; Moutinho 45'	Report	Ginella (yellow card) 10'; Murillo (yellow card) 13', (goal) 38'; Rodríguez 24'; Sánchez 51'; Palacios (yellow card) 59'; Cifuentes (yellow card) 71'; Fall (yellow card) 77'; Opoku 90+3'	Stadium: Exploria Stadium; Attendance: 16,753; Referee: Joseph Dickerson

April 9 7	Orlando City	1–0	Chicago Fire FC	Orlando, Florida
1:00 pm	Kara 59'; Jansson (yellow card) 81'; Méndez (yellow card) 85'	Report	Gutiérrez (yellow card) 5' (yellow-red card) 43'; Espinoza (yellow card) 54'	Stadium: Exploria Stadium; Attendance: 16,051; Referee: Victor Rivas

April 16 8	Columbus Crew	0–2	Orlando City	Columbus, Ohio
7:30 pm	Moreira (yellow card) 45+1'; Artur (yellow card) 90+3'	Report	Schlegel 37', (yellow card) 77'; Kara 51'; Perea (yellow card) 71'; Smith (yellow card) 73'	Stadium: Lower.com Field; Attendance: 18,030; Referee: Drew Fischer

April 24 9	Orlando City	0–3	New York Red Bulls	Orlando, Florida
3:30 pm	Urso (yellow card) 45+3'	Report	Luquinhas 26', (yellow card) 41'; Fletcher (yellow card) 33'; Morgan (yellow card) 42'; Cásseres 48'; Coronel (yellow card) 83'; Morgan 88' (pen.)	Stadium: Exploria Stadium; Attendance: 17,503; Referee: Alex Chilowicz

April 30 10	Orlando City	2–1	Charlotte FC	Orlando, Florida
7:30 pm	Ruan 16', (yellow card) 17'; Torres 45+1'; Schlegel (yellow card) 54'; Jansson (yellow card) 88'	Report	Corujo (yellow card) 28'; Alcívar (yellow card) 54'; Fuchs 60' (pen.); Bronico (yellow card) 60'	Stadium: Exploria Stadium; Attendance: 17,012; Referee: Fotis Bazakos

May 7 11	CF Montréal	4–1	Orlando City	Montreal, Quebec, Canada
4:00 pm	Waterman 21', (yellow card) 24'; Mihailovic (yellow card) 42', (goal) 52'; Quioto (yellow card) 55'; Piette (yellow card) 79'; Torres 81'; Brault-Guillard 84'	Report	Kara (yellow card) 68'; Moutinho 72'; Williams (yellow card) 88'	Stadium: Saputo Stadium; Referee: Guido Gonzales Jr.

May 14 12	Toronto FC	0–1	Orlando City	Toronto, Ontario, Canada
3:00 pm	Bradley (yellow card) 42'	Report	Moutinho (yellow card) 71'; Schlegel (yellow card) 72'; Jansson (yellow card) 88'; Smith 90+2'	Stadium: BMO Field; Attendance: 26,146; Referee: Nima Saghafi

May 22 13	Austin FC	2–2	Orlando City	Austin, Texas
8:00 pm	Driussi 63' (pen.); Djitté 90+5'	Report	Kara 2'; Ruan 22'; Schlegel (yellow card) 58' (yellow-red card) 60'; Pereyra (yellow card) 60'; Araújo (red card) 69'; Jansson (yellow card) 82'; Gallese (yellow card) 90+9'	Stadium: Q2 Stadium; Attendance: 20,738; Referee: Joseph Dickerson

May 28 14	Orlando City	1–3	FC Dallas	Orlando, Florida
7:30 pm	Méndez (yellow card) 12'; Kara 45+3'	Report	Ferreira (yellow card) 42'; Velasco (yellow card) 64'; Arriola 67', 84'; Jara 70'; Quignón (yellow card) 80'; Obrian (yellow card) 86'	Stadium: Exploria Stadium; Attendance: 17,380; Referee: Marcos de Oliveira

June 15 15	New England Revolution	1–1	Orlando City	Foxborough, Massachusetts
7:30 pm	Gil 22'; Kaptoum (yellow card) 24'; Farrell (yellow card) 27'; Borrero (yellow card) 56'; Jones (yellow card) 60'	Report	Jansson (yellow card) 6', (goal) 35'; Mulraney (yellow card) 44'; Schlegel (yellow card) 77'; Smith (yellow card) 88'	Stadium: Gillette Stadium; Attendance: 15,308; Referee: Ramy Touchan

June 18 16	Orlando City	2–1	Houston Dynamo FC	Orlando, Florida
7:30 pm	Jansson (yellow card) 14'; Kara 25', 58'; Pereyra (yellow card) 39'; Gallese (yellow card) 64'	Report	Avila (yellow card) 16'; Lundqvist (yellow card) 20'; Vera (yellow card) 21'; Zeca (yellow card) 32'; Hadebe (yellow card) 44'; Ferreira 59'; Úlfarsson (yellow card) 87'	Stadium: Exploria Stadium; Attendance: 16,333; Referee: Rosendo Mendoza

June 24 17	FC Cincinnati	1–0	Orlando City	Cincinnati, Ohio
7:30 pm	Brenner 65', (yellow card) 80'	Report	Smith (yellow card) 72'	Stadium: TQL Stadium; Attendance: 24,263; Referee: Guido Gonzales Jr.

July 4 18	Orlando City	3–5	D.C. United	Orlando, Florida
7:00 pm	Schlegel (yellow card) 50'; Torres 57'; Kara 66'; Pato 80' (pen.)	Report	Fountas 5', 8', 51'; Smith 74'; Robertha (yellow card) 89', (goal) 90+6'	Stadium: Exploria Stadium; Attendance: 16,631; Referee: Allen Chapman

July 9 19	Orlando City	1–0	Inter Miami CF	Orlando, Florida
8:00 pm	Smith (yellow card) 45+3'; Lowe 90+2' (o.g.)	Report	Duke (yellow card) 52'	Stadium: Exploria Stadium; Attendance: 20,052; Referee: Nima Saghafi
Note: Kick off delayed 1hr 25mins for inclement weather.

July 13 20	Colorado Rapids	1–1	Orlando City	Commerce City, Colorado
9:00 pm	Esteves (yellow card) 40'; Zardes 65'; Abubakar (yellow card) 69'; Lewis (yellow card) 77'; Wilson (yellow card) 82'; Rosenberry (yellow card) 86'	Report	Torres 22'; Pereyra (yellow card) 66'; Urso (yellow card) 77'; Halliday (yellow card) 83'	Stadium: Dick's Sporting Goods Park; Attendance: 12,538; Referee: Fotis Bazakos

July 17 21	Atlanta United FC	1–1	Orlando City	Atlanta, Georgia
3:00 pm	Sejdić (yellow card) 45+1'; McFadden (yellow card) 59'; Purata 71'; L. Araújo (yellow card) 90'	Report	Pereyra 10', (yellow card) 69'; Urso (yellow card) 36'; Michel (yellow card) 73'; Ruan (yellow card) 90+1'	Stadium: Mercedes-Benz Stadium; Referee: Victor Rivas

July 23 22	Orlando City	0–1	Philadelphia Union	Orlando, Florida
7:30 pm	Kara (yellow card) 31'; Moutinho (yellow card) 37'; Araújo (yellow card) 63'	Report	Martínez (yellow card) 8'; Gazdag 39'; Carranza (yellow card) 44'	Stadium: Exploria Stadium; Attendance: 16,031; Referee: Alex Chilowicz

July 31 23	D.C. United	2–1	Orlando City	Washington, D.C.
5:00 pm	Djeffal (yellow card) 8'; Durkin 90+1'; Fountas 90+5'	Report	Urso 9'; Moutinho (yellow card) 69'; Michel (yellow card) 89'	Stadium: Audi Field; Attendance: 15,805; Referee: Armando Villarreal

August 6 24	Orlando City	0–3	New England Revolution	Orlando, Florida
7:30 pm	Carlos (yellow card) 6'; Jansson (yellow card) 66'; Araújo (yellow card) 85'	Report	Polster 20'; Kaptoum 51'; Kessler 75'	Stadium: Exploria Stadium; Referee: Ramy Touchan

August 13 25	New York Red Bulls	0–1	Orlando City	Harrison, New Jersey
6:00 pm	Tolkin (yellow card) 12'; Cásseres (yellow card) 32'	Report	Moutinho (yellow card) 16'; Torres 17'	Stadium: Red Bull Arena; Referee: Rubiel Vazquez

August 21 26	Charlotte FC	1–2	Orlando City	Charlotte, North Carolina
7:00 pm	McNeill (yellow card) 23'; Gaines 66'; Jones (yellow card) 68'	Report	Mulraney (yellow card) 8'; Torres (yellow card) 42'; Carlos (yellow card) 48'; Kara 62'; Pereyra (yellow card) 82'; Akindele 89'	Stadium: Bank of America Stadium; Attendance: 30,855; Referee: Lukasz Szpala

August 28 27	Orlando City	2–1	New York City FC	Orlando, Florida
7:30 pm	Urso 7'; Carlos (yellow card) 50'; Akindele 90+6'	Report	Haak (yellow card) 45+1'; Moralez 53', (yellow card) 89'; Chanot (yellow card) 90+3'	Stadium: Exploria Stadium; Attendance: 16,289; Referee: Chris Penso

August 31 28	Orlando City	3–2	Seattle Sounders FC	Orlando, Florida
7:30 pm	Torres 53'; Carlos (yellow card) 61'; Kara 68' (pen.); Moutinho (yellow card) 90'; Smith 90+1'	Report	Rusnák 26'; Roldán (yellow card) 36'; Ruidíaz 52'	Stadium: Exploria Stadium; Attendance: 14,483; Referee: Alex Chilowicz
Note: Kick off delayed 1hr 52mins for inclement weather.

September 4	Inter Miami CF	v	Orlando City	Fort Lauderdale, Florida
8:00 pm				Stadium: DRV PNK Stadium
Note: Rescheduled to October 5 due to Orlando's participation in the 2022 U.S. Open Cup Final.

September 10 29	Philadelphia Union	5–1	Orlando City	Chester, Pennsylvania
7:30 pm	Moutinho 39' (o.g.); Uhre 43'; Gazdag 55'; Bedoya 63'; Flach (yellow card) 85'; Elliott 87'	Report	Schlegel (yellow card) 65'; Perea 75'	Stadium: Subaru Park; Attendance: 19,079; Referee: Armando Villarreal

September 14 30	Orlando City	0–1	Atlanta United FC	Orlando, Florida
6:00 pm	Cartagena (yellow card) 37'	Report	Dwyer (yellow card) 50'; Almada 72'; Araújo (yellow card) 78'; Mosquera (yellow card) 90+4'	Stadium: Exploria Stadium; Attendance: 15,340; Referee: Rubiel Vazquez
Note: Kick off delayed 55mins for inclement weather.

September 17 31	Orlando City	4–0	Toronto FC	Orlando, Florida
7:30 pm	Torres 9'; Kara 22'; Moutinho (yellow card) 38'; MacNaughton 47' (o.g.); Akindele 84'	Report	Criscito (yellow card) 32'; MacNaughton (yellow card) 82'; Bernardeschi (yellow card) 90'	Stadium: Exploria Stadium; Attendance: 17,189; Referee: Nima Saghafi

October 2 32	New York City FC	2–1	Orlando City	Harrison, New Jersey
1:00 pm	Callens 66'; Moralez (yellow card) 69'; Magno 81', (yellow card) 82'	Report	Torres 47'; Araújo (yellow card) 57'; Urso (yellow card) 89'	Stadium: Red Bull Arena; Attendance: 13,169; Referee: Joseph Dickerson
Note: Moved from October 1 at Citi Field due to New York Mets schedule disruption following MLB lockout.

October 5 33	Inter Miami CF	4–1	Orlando City	Fort Lauderdale, Florida
8:00 pm	Campana 1'; Higuaín 38', 52' (pen.); Lassiter 56'	Report	Carlos (yellow card) 59'; Kara 71'; Urso (yellow card) 83'	Stadium: DRV PNK Stadium; Attendance: 15,228; Referee: Victor Rivas
Note: Rescheduled from September 4 due to Orlando's participation in the 2022 U.S. Open Cup Final.

October 9 34	Orlando City	2–1	Columbus Crew	Orlando, Florida
2:30 pm	Urso 56', (yellow card) 87'; Araújo (yellow card) 58'; Smith (yellow card) 78'; Torres 84' (pen.); Angulo (yellow card) 90'; Michel (yellow card) 90'; Cartagena (yellow card) 90+5'	Report	Santos (yellow card) 9'; Etienne 38'; Nagbe (yellow card) 73'; Degenek (yellow card) 82'	Stadium: Exploria Stadium; Attendance: 21,693; Referee: Alex Chilowicz

==== Standings ====
Eastern Conference table

Pos	Team	Pld	W	L	T	GF	GA	GD	Pts	Qualification
5	FC Cincinnati	34	12	9	13	64	56	+8	49	Qualification for the first round
6	Inter Miami CF	34	14	14	6	47	56	−9	48	Qualification for the first round
7	Orlando City SC	34	14	14	6	44	53	−9	48	Qualification for the first round & 2023 CONCACAF Champions League (Note: as 2022 U.S. Open Cup champions)
8	Columbus Crew	34	10	8	16	46	41	+5	46	
9	Charlotte FC	34	13	18	3	44	52	−8	42	

Source: MLS
Rules for classification: 1) points; 2) total wins; 3) total goal differential; 4) total goals scored; 5) fewer disciplinary points; 6) away goal differential; 7) away goals scored; 8) home goals differential; 9) home goals scored; 10) coin toss (2 clubs tied) or drawing of lots (≥3 clubs tied)
Notes:

Overall table

Pos	Team	Pld	W	L	T	GF	GA	GD	Pts	Qualification
11	Minnesota United FC	34	14	14	6	48	51	−3	48	
12	Inter Miami CF	34	14	14	6	47	56	−9	48	
13	Orlando City SC (U)	34	14	14	6	44	53	−9	48	Qualification for the 2023 CONCACAF Champions League (Note: As 2022 U.S. Open Cup champions (USA4))
14	Real Salt Lake	34	12	11	11	43	45	−2	47	
15	Portland Timbers	34	11	10	13	53	53	0	46	

Source: MLS
Rules for classification: 1) points; 2) total wins; 3) total goal differential; 4) total goals scored; 5) fewer disciplinary points; 6) away goal differential; 7) away goals scored; 8) home goals differential; 9) home goals scored; 10) coin toss (2 clubs tied) or drawing of lots (≥3 clubs tied)
(U) U.S. Open Cup winners

=== MLS Cup Playoffs ===
October 16 First round	#2 CF Montréal	2–0	#7 Orlando City	Montreal, Quebec, Canada
8:00 pm	Kamara (yellow card) 52'; Koné (yellow card) 60', (goal) 68'; Mihailovic 90+9' (pen.)	Report	Carlos (yellow card) 13'; Angulo (yellow card) 31'; Moutinho (yellow card) 77'; Pereyra (yellow card) 90+2'	Stadium: Saputo Stadium; Attendance: 19,619; Referee: Ismail Elfath

=== U.S. Open Cup ===
Following a two-year hiatus as a result of the COVID-19 pandemic, the U.S. Open Cup returned in 2022. Orlando entered in the third round, a round earlier than in previous years, along with all but the eight highest seeded MLS teams from the previous season's regular season standings. All MLS teams were drawn against a lower division team in their allocated regional group for the third round.

April 20 Third round	Orlando City (Florida)	2–1	(Florida) Tampa Bay Rowdies	Orlando, Florida
7:00 pm	Méndez (yellow card) 37'; Pato 52' (pen.); Jansson (yellow card) 61'; Urso 63'	Report	Hilton (yellow card) 10'; Antley (yellow card) 32'; Guillén (yellow card) 51'; Wyke (yellow card) 60'; Mkosana 65'; Scarlett (yellow card) 77'	Stadium: Exploria Stadium; Attendance: 8,057; Referee: Daniel Gutierrez

May 10 Fourth round	Orlando City (Florida)	2–1	(Pennsylvania) Philadelphia Union	Orlando, Florida
7:00 pm	Kara 54'; Perea 57'; Méndez (yellow card) 90+3'	Report	Real (yellow card) 13'; Martínez (yellow card) 68'; Findlay 77'; McGlynn (yellow card) 83'; Wagner (yellow card) 88'	Stadium: Exploria Stadium; Attendance: 7,601; Referee: Elvis Osmanovic

May 25 Round of 16	Orlando City (Florida)	1–1 (a.e.t.) (4–2 p)	(Florida) Inter Miami CF	Orlando, Florida
7:00 pm	Jansson (yellow card) 4'; Schlegel (yellow card) 57'; Torres 97'; Araújo (yellow card) 98'; Pereyra (yellow card) 118'	Report	Gregore (yellow card) 44'; Rodríguez (yellow card) 57'; Lowe (yellow card) 67'; Mota 94'; McVey (yellow card) 113'	Stadium: Exploria Stadium; Attendance: 11,509; Referee: Kevin Broadley
	Penalties
	Kara (penalty scored); Jansson (penalty scored); Perea (penalty scored); Pereya (penalty scored)		(penalty scored) Campana; (penalty missed) Duke; (penalty missed) Yedlin; (penalty scored) Lassiter

June 29 Quarter-final	Orlando City (Florida)	1–1 (a.e.t.) (6–5 p)	(Tennessee) Nashville SC	Orlando, Florida
7:00 pm	Schlegel (yellow card) 60', (goal) 90+4'; Pereyra (yellow card) 71'; Perea (yellow card) 109'	Report	Lovitz (yellow card) 39'; Mukhtar 52', (yellow card) 55'; Sapong (yellow card) 71'; McCarty (yellow card) 72'; Davis (yellow card) 87' (yellow-red card) 91'; Panicco (yellow card) 90+1'; Zubak (yellow card) 90+3'; Maher (yellow card) 102'; Anunga (yellow card) 105+1'	Stadium: Exploria Stadium; Attendance: 11,940; Referee: Mark Allatin
	Penalties
	Kara (penalty scored); Jansson (penalty scored); Perea (penalty missed); Smith (penalty scored); Pato (penalty scored); Carlos (penalty scored); Torres (penalty scored)		(penalty missed) Muyl; (penalty scored) Loba; (penalty scored) Maher; (penalty scored) Zimmerman; (penalty scored) Zubak; (penalty scored) Romney; (penalty missed) Miller

July 27 Semi-final	Orlando City (Florida)	5–1	(New Jersey) New York Red Bulls	Orlando, Florida
7:30 pm	Araújo 45+5', 62', (yellow card) 71'; Pereyra 47'; Ruan (yellow card) 51'; Pato (yellow card) 52'; Torres 75'; Michel 83'; Gioacchini (yellow card) 89'	Report	Luquinhas (yellow card) 30'; Morgan 45+1'; S. Nealis (yellow card) 55'; Coronel (yellow card) 77'	Stadium: Exploria Stadium; Attendance: 11,612; Referee: Victor Rivas

September 7 Final	Orlando City (Florida)	3–0	(California) Sacramento Republic	Orlando, Florida
8:00 pm	Carlos (yellow card) 69'; Torres 75', 80' (pen.); Pereyra (yellow card) 90+1'; Michel 90+6'	Report	Desmond (yellow card) 74'; Felipe (yellow card) 77'; López (yellow card) 79'	Stadium: Exploria Stadium; Attendance: 25,527; Referee: Ramy Touchan

== Squad statistics ==
=== Appearances ===
As of match played October 16, 2022

Starting appearances are listed first, followed by substitute appearances after the + symbol where applicable.

No.	Pos	Nat	Player	Total		MLS		Playoffs		Open Cup	
No.	Pos	Nat	Player	Apps	Goals	Apps	Goals	Apps	Goals	Apps	Goals
Goalkeepers
1	GK	(Peru) PER	Pedro Gallese	36	0	32	0	1	0	3	0
31	GK	(United States) USA	Mason Stajduhar	5	0	2	0	0	0	3	0
40	GK	(United States) USA	Adam Grinwis	0	0	0	0	0	0	0	0
50	GK	(Venezuela) VEN	Javier Otero	0	0	0	0	0	0	0	0
Defenders
2	DF	(Brazil) BRA	Ruan	38	2	29+2	2	1	0	5+1	0
4	DF	(Portugal) POR	João Moutinho	34	2	28	2	1	0	2+3	0
6	DF	(Sweden) SWE	Robin Jansson	27	1	22	1	0	0	4+1	0
15	DF	(Argentina) ARG	Rodrigo Schlegel	36	2	23+6	1	1	0	5+1	1
24	DF	(United States) USA	Kyle Smith	35	2	14+15	2	0	0	4+2	0
25	DF	(Brazil) BRA	Antônio Carlos	25	0	18+3	0	1	0	2+1	0
26	DF	(United States) USA	Michael Halliday	9	0	0+6	0	0+1	0	1+1	0
30	DF	(United States) USA	Alex Freeman	0	0	0	0	0	0	0	0
35	DF	(United States) USA	Brandon Hackenberg	0	0	0	0	0	0	0	0
68	DF	(United States) USA	Thomas Williams	5	0	2+2	0	0	0	1	0
Midfielders
5	MF	(Uruguay) URU	César Araújo	38	2	28+3	0	1	0	5+1	2
10	MF	(Uruguay) URU	Mauricio Pereyra	39	2	31+1	1	1	0	3+3	1
11	MF	(Brazil) BRA	Júnior Urso	41	6	29+5	5	1	0	6	1
16	MF	(Peru) PER	Wilder Cartagena	9	0	4+4	0	0	0	0+1	0
21	MF	(United States) USA	Andrés Perea	30	2	7+17	1	0	0	2+4	1
23	MF	(Republic of Ireland) IRL	Jake Mulraney	18	0	10+7	0	0+1	0	0	0
34	MF	(Jamaica) JAM	Joey DeZart	1	0	0+1	0	0	0	0	0
Forwards
7	FW	(Brazil) BRA	Alexandre Pato	27	4	14+8	3	0	0	4+1	1
9	FW	(Austria) AUT	Ercan Kara	34	12	22+7	11	1	0	3+1	1
13	FW	(Canada) CAN	Tesho Akindele	32	3	4+23	3	0+1	0	2+2	0
17	FW	(Uruguay) URU	Facundo Torres	40	13	29+4	9	1	0	5+1	4
19	FW	(United States) USA	Benji Michel	36	3	14+17	1	0+1	0	2+2	2
20	FW	(United States) USA	Nicholas Gioacchini	7	0	2+4	0	0	0	0+1	0
22	FW	(Argentina) ARG	Gastón González	0	0	0	0	0	0	0	0
77	FW	(Colombia) COL	Iván Angulo	11	0	5+4	0	1	0	1	0
Players away from the club on loan:
22	FW	(Ecuador) ECU	Alexander Alvarado	0	0	0	0	0	0	0	0
27	FW	(United States) USA	Jack Lynn	4	0	0+3	0	0	0	0+1	0
32	FW	(Puerto Rico) PUR	Wilfredo Rivera	0	0	0	0	0	0	0	0
99	FW	(Brazil) BRA	Matheus Aiás	0	0	0	0	0	0	0	0
Players who appeared for the club but left during the season:
8	MF	(Ecuador) ECU	Sebas Méndez	17	0	5+8	0	0	0	2+2	0
14	FW	(Netherlands) NED	Silvester van der Water	5	0	0+4	0	0	0	1	0

=== Goalscorers ===
As of match played October 16, 2022

Rank	No.	Pos.	Name	MLS	Playoffs	Open Cup	Total
1	17	FW	(Uruguay) Facundo Torres	9	0	4	13
2	9	FW	(Austria) Ercan Kara	11	0	1	12
3	11	MF	(Brazil) Júnior Urso	5	0	1	6
4	7	FW	(Brazil) Alexandre Pato	3	0	1	4
5	13	FW	(Canada) Tesho Akindele	3	0	0	3
5	19	FW	(United States) Benji Michel	1	0	2	3
7	2	DF	(Brazil) Ruan	2	0	0	2
7	4	DF	(Portugal) João Moutinho	2	0	0	2
7	5	MF	(Uruguay) César Araújo	0	0	2	2
7	10	MF	(Uruguay) Mauricio Pereyra	1	0	1	2
7	15	DF	(Argentina) Rodrigo Schlegel	1	0	1	2
7	21	MF	(United States) Andrés Perea	1	0	1	2
7	24	DF	(United States) Kyle Smith	2	0	0	2
14	6	DF	(Sweden) Robin Jansson	1	0	0	1
Own goal				2	0	0	2
Total				44	0	14	58

=== Shutouts ===
As of match played October 16, 2022

Rank	No.	Pos.	Name	MLS	Playoffs	Open Cup	Total
1	1	GK	(Peru) Pedro Gallese	9	0	1	10
Total				9	0	1	10

=== Disciplinary record ===
As of match played October 16, 2022

No.	Pos.	Name	MLS			Playoffs			Open Cup			Total		
No.	Pos.	Name	Booked	(yellow card) (yellow-red card)	Sent off (straight red)	Booked	(yellow card) (yellow-red card)	Sent off (straight red)	Booked	(yellow card) (yellow-red card)	Sent off (straight red)	Booked	(yellow card) (yellow-red card)	Sent off (straight red)
1	GK	(Peru) Pedro Gallese	3	0	0	0	0	0	0	0	0	3	0	0
2	DF	(Brazil) Ruan	3	0	0	0	0	0	1	0	0	4	0	0
4	DF	(Portugal) João Moutinho	8	0	0	1	0	0	0	0	0	9	0	0
5	CM	(Uruguay) César Araújo	8	0	1	0	0	0	2	0	0	10	0	1
6	DF	(Sweden) Robin Jansson	9	1	0	0	0	0	2	0	0	11	1	0
7	FW	(Brazil) Alexandre Pato	0	0	0	0	0	0	1	0	0	1	0	0
8	MF	(Ecuador) Sebas Méndez	2	0	0	0	0	0	2	0	0	4	0	0
9	FW	(Austria) Ercan Kara	2	0	0	0	0	0	0	0	0	2	0	0
10	MF	(Uruguay) Mauricio Pereyra	5	0	0	1	0	0	3	0	0	9	0	0
11	MF	(Brazil) Júnior Urso	7	0	0	0	0	0	0	0	0	7	0	0
15	DF	(Argentina) Rodrigo Schlegel	6	1	0	0	0	0	2	0	0	8	1	0
16	MF	(Peru) Wilder Cartagena	2	0	0	0	0	0	0	0	0	2	0	0
17	FW	(Uruguay) Facundo Torres	1	0	0	0	0	0	0	0	0	1	0	0
19	FW	(United States) Benji Michel	4	0	0	0	0	0	0	0	0	4	0	0
20	FW	(United States) Nicholas Gioacchini	0	0	0	0	0	0	1	0	0	1	0	0
21	MF	(Brazil) Andrés Perea	1	0	0	0	0	0	1	0	0	2	0	0
23	MF	(Republic of Ireland) Jake Mulraney	2	0	0	0	0	0	0	0	0	2	0	0
24	DF	(United States) Kyle Smith	5	0	0	0	0	0	0	0	0	5	0	0
25	DF	(Brazil) Antônio Carlos	6	0	0	1	0	0	1	0	0	8	0	0
26	DF	(United States) Michael Halliday	1	0	0	0	0	0	0	0	0	1	0	0
68	DF	(United States) Thomas Williams	1	0	0	0	0	0	0	0	0	1	0	0
77	FW	(Colombia) Iván Angulo	1	0	0	1	0	0	0	0	0	2	0	0
Total			77	2	1	4	0	0	13	0	0	94	2	1

== Player movement ==
Per Major League Soccer and club policies, terms of the deals do not get disclosed.

=== MLS SuperDraft picks ===
Draft picks are not automatically signed to the team roster. The 2022 MLS SuperDraft was held on January 11, 2022. Orlando made three selections.

2022 Orlando City MLS SuperDraft Picks
Round	Selection	Player	Position	College	Status
1	18	(United States) Jack Lynn	CF	(Indiana) University of Notre Dame	Signed
2	46	(Canada) Nathan Dossantos	CB	(West Virginia) Marshall University	Not signed
3	74	(Cambodia) Nick Taylor	LW	University of Central Florida	Signed to OCB

=== Transfers in ===
No.	Name	Pos.	Transferred from	Fee/notes	Date	Ref.
5	(Uruguay) César Araújo	CM	(Uruguay) Montevideo Wanderers	Undisclosed fee, reportedly $2m	January 7, 2022	
17	(Uruguay) Facundo Torres	LW	(Uruguay) Peñarol	Undisclosed fee, reportedly $9m	January 24, 2022	
9	(Austria) Ercan Kara	CF	(Austria) Rapid Wien	Undisclosed fee; reportedly $800k	January 27, 2022	
30	(United States) Alex Freeman	RB	(United States) Orlando City Academy	Signed Homegrown contract	February 15, 2022	
23	(Republic of Ireland) Jake Mulraney	LM	(United States) Atlanta United FC	Traded in exchange for $200,000 GAM with a potential $75,000 GAM pending performance-based conditions.	May 5, 2022	
22	(Argentina) Gastón González	LW	(Argentina) Unión Santa Fe	Undisclosed fee	May 5, 2022	
20	(United States) Nicholas Gioacchini	CF	(France) Caen	Free transfer	July 20, 2022	

=== Loans in ===
No.	Name	Pos.	Loaned from	Notes	Date	Ref.
35	(United States) Brandon Hackenberg	CB	(United States) Orlando City B	Short-term loan from MLS Next Pro contract until May 11	May 7, 2022	
50	(Venezuela) Javier Otero	GK	(United States) Orlando City B	Short-term loan from MLS Next Pro contract until June 16	June 15, 2022	
77	(Colombia) Iván Angulo	LW	(Brazil) Palmeiras	12-month loan with option for six-month extension	July 25, 2022	
16	(Peru) Wilder Cartagena	DM	(United Arab Emirates) Al-Ittihad Kalba	Until end of 2022 season with 2023 loan extension option	August 2, 2022	

=== Transfers out ===
No.	Name	Pos.	Transferred to	Fee/notes	Date	Ref.
3	(Argentina) Emmanuel Mas	LB	(Argentina) Estudiantes LP	Option declined; signed with Estudiantes on 1/6/22	December 1, 2021	
17	(Portugal) Nani	LW	(Italy) Venezia	Option declined; signed with Venezia on 1/14/22	December 1, 2021	
28	(United States) Raul Aguilera	DM	(United States) Indy Eleven	Option declined; signed with Indy Eleven on 1/13/22	December 1, 2021	
29	(United States) Rio Hope-Gund	CB	(United States) Loudoun United	Option declined; signed with Loudoun United on 2/11/22	December 1, 2021	
30	(United States) David Loera	AM	(United States) San Antonio FC	Option declined; signed with San Antonio FC on 1/11/22	December 1, 2021	
33	(United States) Jordan Bender	AM	(South Africa) Cape Town City	Option declined; signed with Cape Town City on 7/26/22	December 1, 2021	
35	(United States) Derek Dodson	CF	(United States) Memphis 901	Option declined; signed with Memphis 901 on 2/18/22	December 1, 2021	
9	(United States) Chris Mueller	RW	(Scotland) Hibernian	Contract expired; agreed pre-contract with Hibernian on 7/21/21	December 1, 2021	
20	(Spain) Uri Rosell	DM	(United States) Sporting Kansas City	Contract expired; signed with Sporting Kansas City on 12/21/21	December 1, 2021	
18	(United States) Daryl Dike	CF	(England) West Bromwich Albion	Undisclosed fee, reportedly $9.5m	January 1, 2022	
14	(Netherlands) Silvester van der Water	RW	(Netherlands) SC Cambuur	Undisclosed fee	July 1, 2022	
99	(Brazil) Matheus Aias	CF	(Spain) Racing Santander	Undisclosed fee	July 8, 2022	
8	(Ecuador) Sebas Méndez	DM	(United States) Los Angeles FC	Traded in exchange for $300,000 GAM with a potential $450,000 GAM pending performance-based conditions. Orlando retain an undisclosed sell-on percentage	July 19, 2022	

=== Loans out ===
No.	Name	Pos.	Loaned to	Notes	Date	Ref.
99	(Brazil) Matheus Aiás	CF	(Spain) Real Oviedo	Continuation of 12-month loan until June 30, 2022	July 4, 2021	
22	(Ecuador) Alexander Alvarado	LW	(Ecuador) L.D.U. Quito	Until December 31, 2022, with option to buy	January 19, 2022	
32	(Puerto Rico) Wilfredo Rivera	LW	(United States) Indy Eleven	Until December 31, 2022 with right of recall	July 25, 2022	
27	(United States) Jack Lynn	CF	(United States) San Antonio FC	Until December 31, 2022 with right of recall	September 16, 2022	
