= César Araújo =

Uruguayan footballer (born 2001)

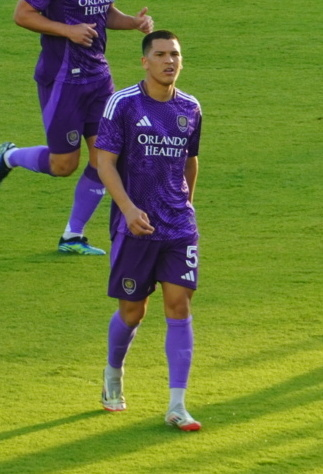
- Araújo with Orlando City in 2025

Personal information
- Full name: César Nahuel Araújo Vilches
- Date of birth: 2 April 2001 (age 25)
- Place of birth: Cerrito, Montevideo, Uruguay
- Height: 1.89 m (6 ft 2 in)
- Positions: Defensive midfielder; central midfielder

Team information
- Current team: Tigres UANL
- Number: 5

Youth career
- Marconi FC
- Montevideo Wanderers

Senior career*
Years	Team	Apps	(Gls)
2019–2022	Montevideo Wanderers	58	(0)
2022–2025	Orlando City	120	(4)
2026–	Tigres UANL	18	(0)

International career
2024	Uruguay U23	5	(1)
2024	Uruguay	1	(0)
- * Club domestic league appearances and goals as of 06:56, 8 August 2026 (UTC)

César Nahuel Araújo Vilches (born 2 April 2001) is a Uruguayan professional footballer who plays as a defensive or central midfielder for Liga MX club Tigres UANL.

Araújo began his senior football career with Montevideo Wanderers, with whom he was named to the Uruguayan Primera División Team of the Year in 2021. In 2022, Araújo joined Major League Soccer (MLS) franchise Orlando City, and he helped to win the team's first trophy since joining MLS through winning the 2022 U.S. Open Cup. In 2024, Araújo received his first call-up to the Uruguay national football team.

== Club career ==
=== Montevideo Wanderers ===
Growing up in Cerrito, Montevideo, Araújo played for youth club Marconi FC before joining the academy at Montevideo Wanderers. On 1 August 2019, Araújo made his professional debut as a 68th-minute substitute in a 2–1 defeat to Brazilian side Corinthians in the 2019 Copa Sudamericana round of 16.

He didn't make another senior appearance for 12 months until substituting on for his Uruguayan Primera División debut on 9 August 2020 in a 2–0 win against Boston River. At the end of the 2021 season, Araújo was named on the bench in the Primera División Team of the Year. He was also named Wanderers' Player of the Year in 2021.

=== Orlando City ===
On 7 January 2022, Araújo transferred to Major League Soccer team Orlando City for a reported $2,000,000 fee. He signed a three-year contract with an additional option year and joined as part of the new MLS U22 initiative. On 27 May, Araújo was fined by the MLS Disciplinary Committee for failing to leave the field in a timely manner after receiving a red card during a match against Austin FC five days earlier.

Having never previously scored a goal in his senior club career spanning 88 matches, Araújo scored his first goals on 27 July when he netted twice during a 5–1 victory over New York Red Bulls in the U.S. Open Cup semifinal. On 7 September, Araújo was part of the squad that won the U.S. Open Cup final 3–0 over Sacramento Republic.

On 4 April 2023, Araújo was fined by the MLS Disciplinary Committee for violating the league's simulation/embellishment policy in a match against Nashville SC three days earlier.

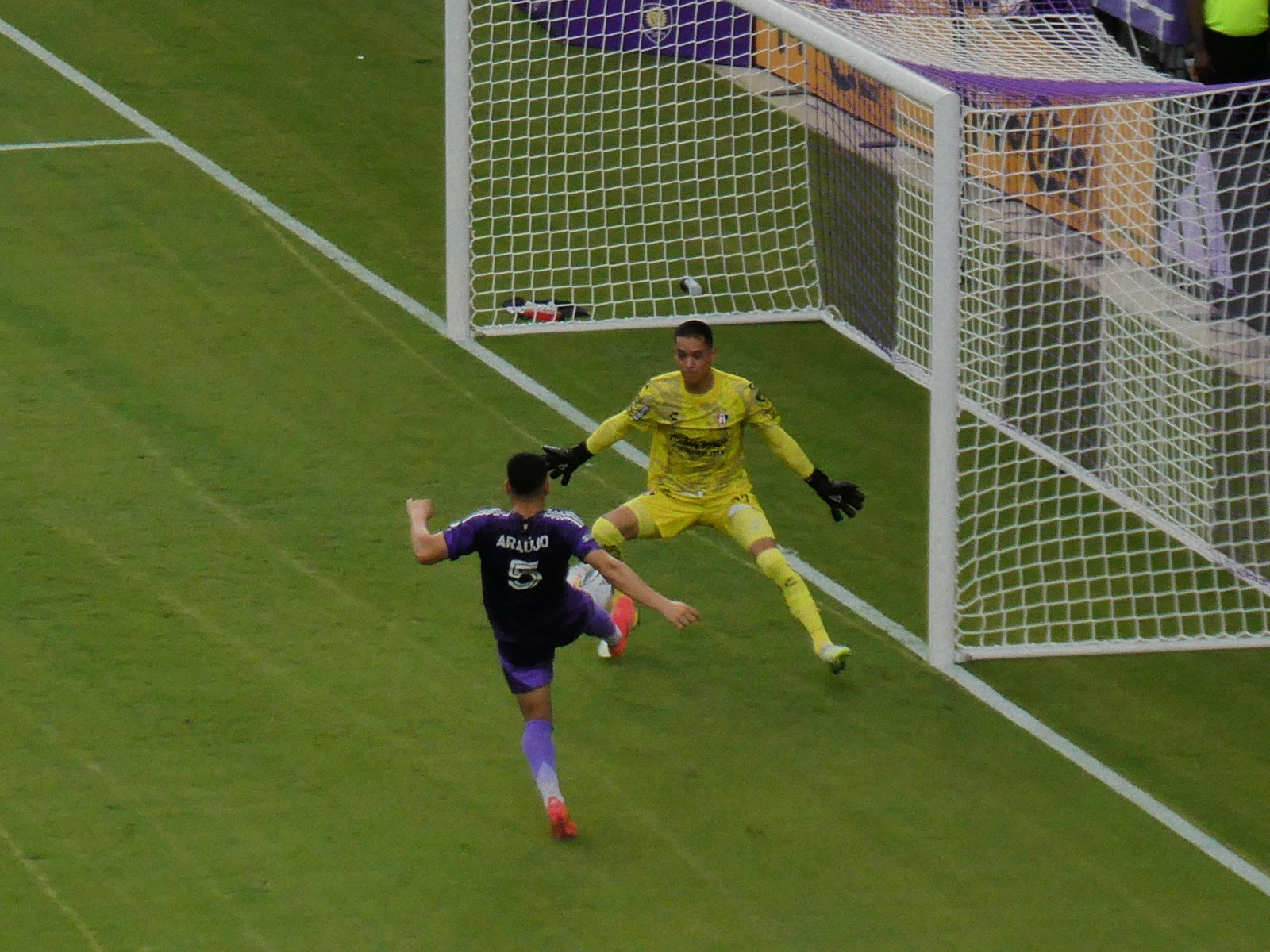
Araújo attacking the Atlas goal in 2025

On 1 March 2025, Araújo made his 100th appearance for the club in a match against Toronto FC. Araújo scored the opening goal, a free kick which hit the post before going into the goal, before assisting in the third goal of the match scored by Martín Ojeda, helping the match end 4–2 in Orlando City's favor. Araújo's performance saw him named to the Team of the Matchday.

On 30 May, Araújo was fined by the MLS Disciplinary Committee for failing to leave the field in a timely manner after receiving a red card in a 3–2 loss to Atlanta United two days earlier in which he had scored the opening goal. At the conclusion of the season, Araújo elected to leave at the end of his contract.

=== Tigres UANL ===
On 2 February 2026, Araújo joined Liga MX club Tigres UANL. Araújo made his debut four days later as a 77th-minute substitute for Juan Brunetta in a 5–1 win over Santos Laguna. Tigres UANL advanced to the final of the 2026 CONCACAF Champions Cup, where they lost 6–5 on penalties to Toluca after a 1–1 full-time draw.

== International career ==
Araújo was named to multiple Uruguay under-20 training camps in 2020 and 2021.

On 7 January 2022, Araújo received his first senior Uruguay national team call-up as part of a 50-player preliminary roster for 2022 FIFA World Cup qualifiers. On 21 October 2022, he was named in Uruguay's 55-man preliminary squad for the 2022 FIFA World Cup. However, he was not included in the final squad, which was announced three weeks later.

Araújo made his debut on 5 June 2024 in a friendly against Mexico at the Empower Field at Mile High in Denver. He substituted Rodrigo Bentancur in the 89th minute as Uruguay won 4–0.

== Personal life ==
Araújo is also the younger brother of professional footballer Maximiliano Araújo.

== Career statistics ==
=== Club ===
As of 11 August 2026

Appearances and goals by club, season and competition
Club	Season	League			National cup		Continental (Note: Includes Copa Sudamericana, Copa Libertadores, and CONCACAF Champions Cup)		Playoffs		Other		Total	
Club	Season	Division	Apps	Goals	Apps	Goals	Apps	Goals	Apps	Goals	Apps	Goals	Apps	Goals
Montevideo Wanderers	2019	Uruguayan; Primera División	0	0	—		1 (Note: Appearance in Copa Sudamericana)	0	—		—		1	0
Montevideo Wanderers	2020	Uruguayan; Primera División	29	0	—		—		1 (Note: Appearance in the Torneo Intermedio Final)	0	—		30	0
Montevideo Wanderers	2021	Uruguayan; Primera División	29	0	—		2 (Note: Appearances in Copa Libertadores)	0	—		1 (Note: Appearance in the Supercopa Uruguaya)	0	32	0
Montevideo Wanderers	Total		58	0	0	0	3	0	1	0	1	0	63	0
Orlando City	2022	Major League Soccer	32	0	6	2	—		1	0	—		39	2
Orlando City	2023	Major League Soccer	36	1	1	0	2	0	3	0	3 (Note: Appearances in Leagues Cup)	1	45	2
Orlando City	2024	Major League Soccer	30	1	—		3	0	5	0	3	0	41	1
Orlando City	2025	Major League Soccer	22	2	2	0	—		1	0	6	0	31	2
Orlando City	Total		120	4	9	2	5	0	10	0	12	1	155	7
Tigres UANL	2025–26	Liga MX	15	0	—		7	0	—		—		22	0
Tigres UANL	2026–27	Liga MX	3	0	0	0	0	0	—		3	0	6	0
Tigres UANL	Total		123	4	9	2	5	0	10	0	15	1	161	7
Career total			196	4	9	2	15	0	11	0	16	0	247	7

=== International ===
As of match played on 5 June 2024

Appearances and goals by national team and year
National team	Year	Apps	Goals
Uruguay	2024	1	0
Total		1	0

== Honours ==
Tigres UANL

- CONCACAF Champions Cup: 2026 runners-up

Orlando City

- U.S. Open Cup: 2022

Individual

- Uruguayan Primera División Team of the Year: 2021
