= Robin Jansson =

Swedish footballer (born 1991)

- Jansson with Orlando City in 2026

Personal information
- Full name: Per Tony Robin Jansson
- Date of birth: 15 November 1991 (age 34)
- Place of birth: Trollhättan, Sweden
- Height: 1.86 m (6 ft 1 in)
- Position: Centre-back

Team information
- Current team: Orlando City
- Number: 6

Youth career
- 1997–2005: Bengtsfors IF
- 2005–2006: Dals Långeds IK
- 2007: Melleruds IF
- 2008–2010: BK Häcken

Senior career*
Years	Team	Apps	(Gls)
2010–2011	BK Häcken	0	(0)
2011	→ FC Trollhättan (loan)	1	(0)
2012–2015	Bengtsfors IF		
2016–2018	IK Oddevold	46	(2)
2018–2019	AIK	25	(2)
2019–	Orlando City	214	(6)

International career^{‡}
2019	Sweden	1	(0)
- * Club domestic league appearances and goals as of 01:56, 11 October 2026 (UTC) ‡ National team caps and goals as of 9 January 2019

Per Tony Robin Jansson (Swedish pronunciation: [ˈrɔ̌bːɪn ˈjɑ̌ːnsɔn]; born 15 November 1991) is a Swedish professional footballer who plays as a centre-back for Major League Soccer club Orlando City, whom he captains.

Jansson made his professional debut with BK Häcken in a 2010 Svenska Cupen game. Jansson would be sent on loan to FC Trollhättan in the third tier of Swedish football, where he would make a single league appearance. Jansson spent several seasons playing semi-professional football, before returning to the third tier of Swedish football with IK Oddevold in 2016. After two seasons with IK Oddevold, Jansson was signed by Allsvenskan club AIK to shore up the squad due to injury issues within the team. Jansson played a pivotal part in AIK's season as they won the league, and he made a single appearance with the Sweden national team. In 2019, Jansson signed with Major League Soccer franchise Orlando City, and in 2024 he became the team's captain.

== Professional career ==
=== Early career ===
Jansson began his career with BK Häcken, starting in their youth academy and making his professional debut on 19 May 2010 in a Svenska Cupen third round game against Östersunds FK, his only appearance of the season. He went on loan to Division 1 Södra side FC Trollhättan for the 2011 season before leaving Häcken at the end of the year.

He spent several seasons in the fifth tier with semi-professional outfit Bengtsfors IF before returning to the third tier with IK Oddevold. During this time, Jansson also had to work a second job in a horseshoe factory.

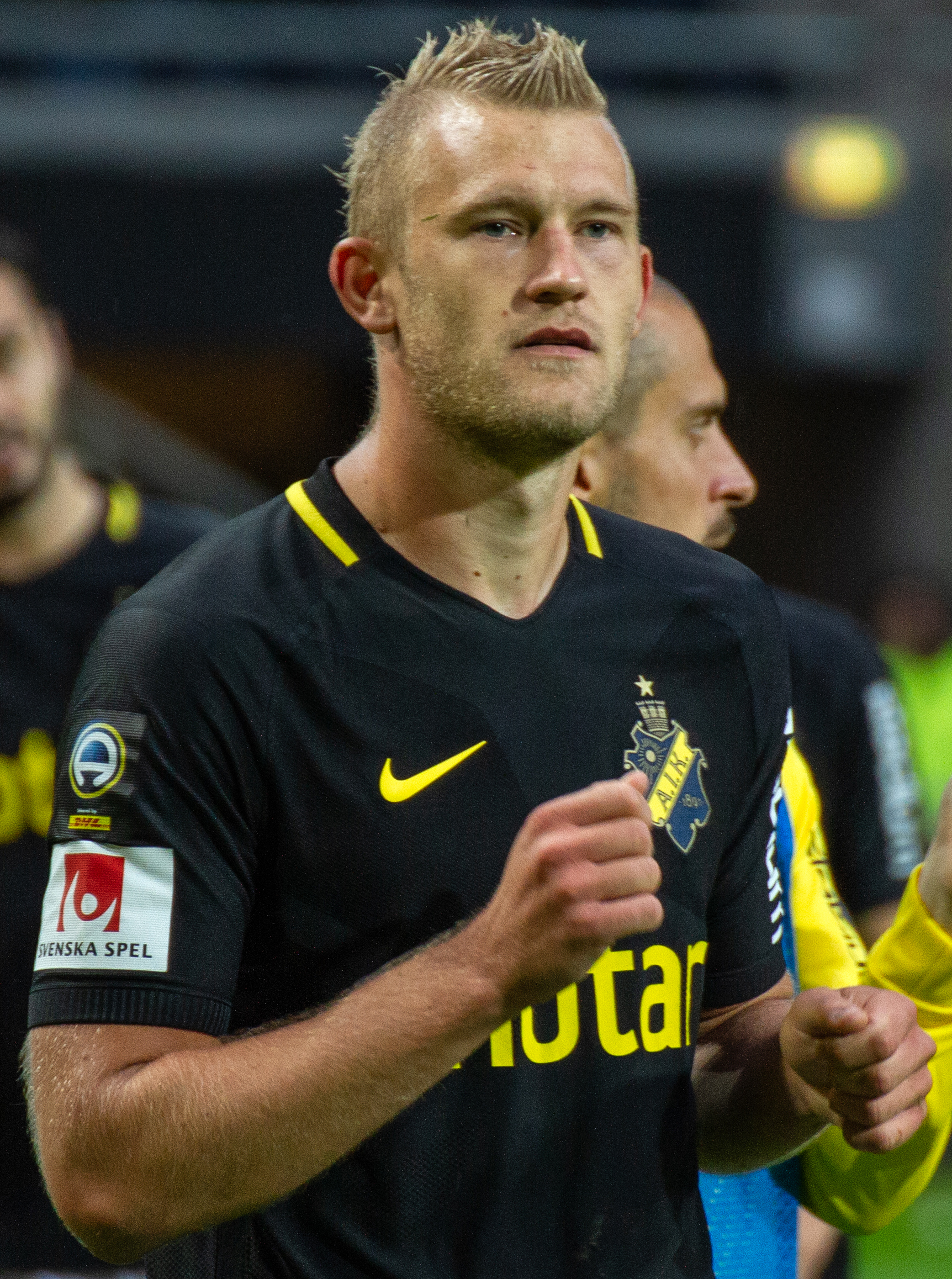
Jansson with AIK in 2018

=== AIK ===
Jansson signed for Allsvenskan team AIK in April 2018 and made his debut against Örebro SK on 18 April 2018. Having joined from the Swedish third division as emergency injury cover, Jansson was a surprise success at AIK, featuring as a regular starter in one of the league's best defensive teams. On 11 November 2018, he scored the decisive goal in a 1–0 win over Kalmar FF as the team secured the Allsvenskan title for the first time in nine years.

=== Orlando City ===
On 12 March 2019 it was announced Jansson had signed with MLS side Orlando City. He made his debut on 23 March in a 1–0 win away to New York Red Bulls. He scored his first goal for the team on 13 June in a 3–1 U.S. Open Cup win over Memphis 901. On 27 October 2021, Jansson surpassed 7,693 minutes played for Orlando City, breaking the previous club record for minutes played by an outfield player set by Cristian Higuita in 2019. He marked the occasion with a stoppage-time goal during Orlando's 3–2 defeat to Columbus Crew.

Ahead of the 2024 season, Jansson was named club captain following the departure of Mauricio Pereyra. On 24 November, Jansson became the first Orlando player to reach 200 appearances across all competitions for the club when he started in Orlando's MLS Cup playoffs semi-finals victory over Atlanta United. On 18 September 2025, Orlando City launched a limited time Robin Jansson collection of merchandise which included two t-shirts, a hoodie, and an adjustable hat. After the conclusion of the season, Orlando City declined to exercise Jansson's contract option, but began negotiations to sign him to a new contract. On 1 December, Jansson signed a new two-year contract with the team, and over the off-season Jansson underwent surgery to repair a Jones fracture in the fifth metatarsal bone of his right foot.

In October 2026, Jansson suffered an injury during a training which required him to undergo another surgery to repair a Jones fracture in the fifth metatarsal bone of his right foot, and it ruled him out for the remainder of the season. However, on 6 November, Jansson announced his retirement from professional football at the end of the season. Jansson will retire as Orlando City's record holder for appearances, starts, and minutes played across all competitions. Orlando City sporting director and general manager Ricardo Moreira described Jansson as "a club legend" due to his performances, accomplishments, leadership, and teamwork during his tenure with the club.

== International career ==
Having never played for Sweden at youth level, Jansson's league-winning form with AIK caught the eye of Janne Andersson who called him up in December 2018. He made his international debut on 8 January 2019, playing the full 90 minutes in a 1–0 friendly defeat to Finland.

== Career statistics ==
=== Club ===
As of match played 10 October 2026

Appearances and goals by club, season and competition
Club	Season	League			National cup (Note: Includes Svenska Cupen and U.S. Open Cup)		Continental (Note: Includes UEFA Europa League and CONCACAF Champions Cup)		Playoffs		Other		Total	
Club	Season	Division	Apps	Goals	Apps	Goals	Apps	Goals	Apps	Goals	Apps	Goals	Apps	Goals
IK Oddevold	2016	Division 1 Södra	23	2	2	0	—		—		—		25	2
IK Oddevold	2017	Division 1 Södra	23	0	3	0	—		—		—		26	0
IK Oddevold	Total		46	2	5	0	0	0	0	0	0	0	51	2
AIK	2018	Allsvenskan	25	2	3	1	3	0	—		—		31	3
Orlando City	2019	Major League Soccer	28	0	4	1	—		—		—		32	1
Orlando City	2020	Major League Soccer	22	0	—		—		2	0	4 (Note: Appearances in MLS is Back Tournament)	0	28	0
Orlando City	2021	Major League Soccer	28	3	—		—		1	0	1 (Note: Appearances in Leagues Cup)	0	30	3
Orlando City	2022	Major League Soccer	22	1	5	0	—		0	0	—		27	1
Orlando City	2023	Major League Soccer	33	0	1	0	2	0	3	0	3	0	42	0
Orlando City	2024	Major League Soccer	30	1	—		3	0	5	0	3	0	40	1
Orlando City	2025	Major League Soccer	30	1	1	0	—		1	0	5	0	37	1
Orlando City	2026	Major League Soccer	21	0	3	0	—		—		2	0	26	0
Orlando City	Total		214	6	14	1	5	0	12	0	18	0	263	7
Career total			285	10	22	2	8	0	12	0	18	0	344	12

=== International ===
Appearances and goals by national team and year
National team	Year	Apps	Goals
Sweden	2019	1	0
Total		1	0

== Honours ==
AIK

- Allsvenskan: 2018

Orlando City

- U.S. Open Cup: 2022
