= Andrés Perea =

American soccer player (born 2000)

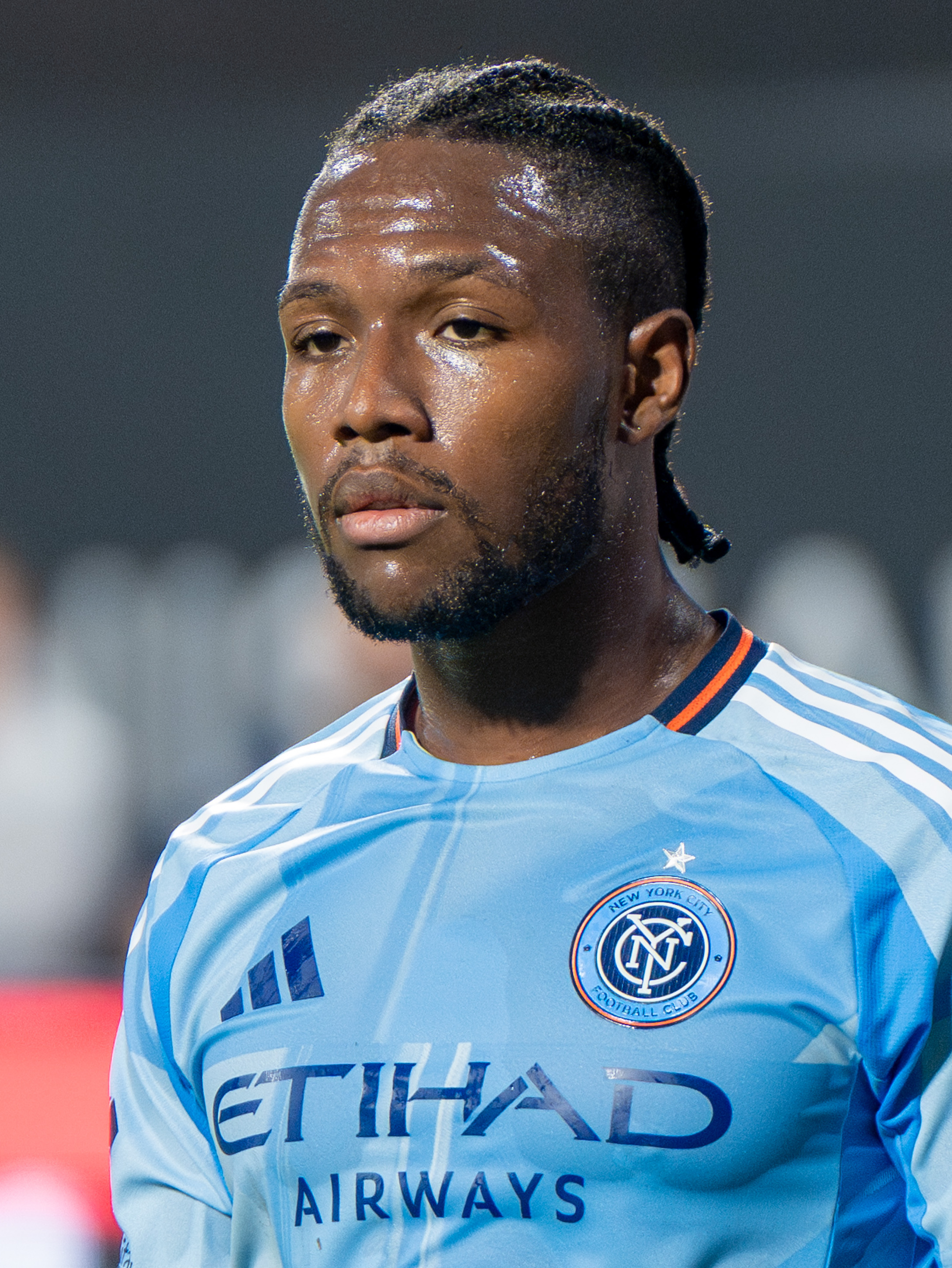
- Perea with New York City FC in 2025

Personal information
- Full name: Andrés Felipe Perea Castañeda
- Date of birth: November 14, 2000 (age 25)
- Place of birth: Tampa, Florida, United States
- Height: 6 ft 0 in (1.83 m)
- Position: Defensive midfielder

Team information
- Current team: New York City FC
- Number: 8

Youth career
- 2006–2017: Atlético Nacional

Senior career*
Years	Team	Apps	(Gls)
2017–2020	Atlético Nacional	14	(1)
2020	→ Orlando City (loan)	23	(0)
2021–2022	Orlando City	51	(3)
2023	Philadelphia Union	8	(1)
2023	→ New York City (loan)	10	(1)
2024–	New York City	52	(6)

International career^{‡}
2017	Colombia U17	12	(1)
2019–2020	Colombia U20	5	(0)
2021	United States U23	4	(0)
2021	United States	1	(0)
- * Club domestic league appearances and goals as of October 18, 2025 ‡ National team caps and goals as of March 28, 2021

Andrés Felipe Perea Castañeda (born November 14, 2000) is an American professional soccer player who plays as a defensive midfielder for Major League Soccer club New York City FC.

== Youth ==
Perea lived in Tampa, Florida, United States, for the first five years of his life, playing for Old Mars FC and West Florida Premier. He moved to Colombia where he enrolled in the Atlético Nacional youth academy aged six. In 2013, Perea was part of the Atlético Nacional team that won the prestigious national youth tournament Torneo de Pony Fútbol.

== Club career ==
=== Atlético Nacional ===
On July 10, 2017, Perea made his senior debut for Atlético Nacional as a 77th-minute substitute in a 1–0 defeat to Santa Fe. In doing so he became the first player born in the 21st century to play for the club. He scored his first goal for the team on April 19, 2019, in a 4–0 victory over Patriotas.

=== Orlando City ===
On December 9, 2019, Perea joined MLS team Orlando City on loan ahead of the 2020 season. He made his debut for the team as a substitute on February 29, 2020, in the season opener as the team drew 0–0 with Real Salt Lake. A week later, Perea made his first start, registering an assist on the team's first goal of the season scored by Chris Mueller as Orlando lost 2–1 away to Colorado Rapids.

After making 28 appearances in his debut season with Orlando, Perea had his loan move made permanent as part of the club's end of season roster moves on December 2, 2020.

Perea scored his first goal in U.S. Open Cup competition on May 10, 2022, the winner in a 2–1 round of 32 victory over the Philadelphia Union.

=== Philadelphia Union ===
On December 6, 2022, Perea was traded to Philadelphia Union in exchange for $750,000 in General Allocation Money with the potential for an additional $100,000 in GAM if certain contract conditions are met and will also retain a portion of any future transfer fee.

== International career ==
Born in Tampa, Florida, Perea holds dual citizenship with the United States and Colombia.

In 2017, Perea was part of the Colombia under-17 teams at both the Campeonato Sudamericano Sub-17 and FIFA U-17 World Cup. In May 2019, Perea was called up to the Colombia under-20 squad for the FIFA U-20 World Cup as an injury replacement for Yéiler Góez and started all five games as Colombia reached the quarter-finals before being eliminated by eventual winners Ukraine.

In December 2020, Perea was called up to the United States national team for the first time for a friendly against El Salvador as a replacement following Frankie Amaya's withdrawal but did not appear in the game. On January 12, 2021, while at a training camp with the United States under-23 team, it was announced that Perea was granted a one-time switch by FIFA to represent the United States competitively. He made his debut for the United States on January 31, 2021, as a half-time substitute for Sebastian Lletget in a 7–0 friendly win over Trinidad and Tobago. Perea conceded a penalty which was saved by Matt Turner.

Perea was named to the final 20-player United States under-23 roster for the 2020 CONCACAF Men's Olympic Qualifying Championship in March 2021.

== Personal life ==
Andrés is the son of former soccer player and Atlético Nacional under-20 coach Nixon Perea.

== Career statistics ==
=== Club ===
As of match played October 18, 2025

Appearances and goals by club, season, and competition
Club	Season	League			National cup		Continental		Playoffs		Other		Total	
Club	Season	Division	Apps	Goals	Apps	Goals	Apps	Goals	Apps	Goals	Apps	Goals	Apps	Goals
Atlético Nacional	2017	Categoría Primera A	2	0	0	0	0	0	—		—		2	0
Atlético Nacional	2018	Categoría Primera A	1	0	1	0	0	0	—		—		2	0
Atlético Nacional	2019	Categoría Primera A	11	1	0	0	0	0	—		—		11	1
Atlético Nacional	Total		14	1	1	0	0	0	—		—		15	1
Orlando City (loan)	2020	MLS	23	0	—		—		2	0	3 (Note: Appearances in MLS is Back Tournament knockout stage)	0	28	0
Orlando City	2021	MLS	27	2	—		—		—		1 (Note: Appearance in Leagues Cup)	0	28	2
Orlando City	2022	MLS	24	1	6	1	—		—		—		30	2
Orlando City	Total		74	3	6	1	—		2	0	4	0	86	4
Philadelphia Union	2023	MLS	8	1	1	0	2 (Note: Appearances in CONCACAF Champions Cup)	2	—		—		11	3
New York City FC (loan)	2023	MLS	10	1	—		—		—		—		10	1
New York City FC	2024	MLS	28	3	—		—		4	0	—		32	3
New York City FC	2025	MLS	24	3	1	0	—		0	0	3	0	28	3
New York City FC	Total		62	7	1	0	—		4	0	3	0	70	7
Career totals			158	12	9	1	2	2	6	0	7	0	182	15

=== International ===
As of match played March 28, 2021

Appearances and goals by national team and year
National team	Year	Apps	Goals
United States	2021	1	0
Total		1	0

== Honors ==
Orlando City

- U.S. Open Cup: 2022
