= Ruan (footballer, born 1995) =

Brazilian footballer (born 1995)

Personal information
- Full name: Ruan Gregório Teixeira
- Date of birth: 29 May 1995 (age 31)
- Place of birth: Rio de Janeiro, Brazil
- Height: 1.70 m (5 ft 7 in)
- Position: Right-back

Youth career
- –2016: Barra da Tijuca

Senior career*
Years	Team	Apps	(Gls)
2016–2019	Barra da Tijuca	0	(0)
2016–2017	→ Madureira (loan)	4	(0)
2017	→ Boa (loan)	25	(0)
2018	→ Internacional (loan)	0	(0)
2018	→ Ponte Preta (loan)	17	(0)
2019	→ Orlando City (loan)	25	(0)
2020–2022	Orlando City	76	(4)
2023	D.C. United	10	(0)
2024	CF Montréal	25	(2)
2024	FC Dallas	6	(0)
2025	Atlético Goianiense	16	(0)
2025–2026	Göztepe	2	(0)
2026	Sakaryaspor	13	(1)
- * Club domestic league appearances and goals as of 7 May 2026

Ruan Gregório Teixeira (born 29 May 1995), known simply as Ruan, is a Brazilian professional footballer who plays as a right-back.

== Career ==
On 16 January 2019, Ruan joined Major League Soccer club Orlando City on a one-year loan from Brazilian club Barra da Tijuca. He had previously had loan spells in Brazil with Madureira, Boa, Internacional and Ponte Preta. He made 28 appearances for Orlando across all competitions and was named to the MLS Team of the Week three times in 2019.

On 22 November 2019, Orlando announced the permanent transfer of Ruan ahead of the 2020 season, signing him to a two-year contract with an option for a third. Ruan remained the first choice right-back for Orlando when available, making 52 appearances across the next two seasons including 46 starts. He registered four assists in each of the 2020 and 2021 seasons. Following the team's run to the MLS is Back Tournament final, Ruan was named in the MLS is Back Best XI. Having not scored during 2019 or 2020, Ruan scored his first goal for the club on 15 September 2021 in a 4–2 defeat to CF Montréal, before scoring again in the following game four days later, a 3–1 defeat against Philadelphia Union.

Ahead of the 2022 season, Ruan signed a new two-year deal with the option for a third year.

On 21 December 2022, Ruan was traded to D.C. United in exchange for the #2 overall selection in the 2023 MLS SuperDraft.

== Career statistics ==
As of 16 October 2022

Appearances and goals by club, season and competition
Club	Season	League			National cup		Continental		Playoffs		Other		Total	
Club	Season	Division	Apps	Goals	Apps	Goals	Apps	Goals	Apps	Goals	Apps	Goals	Apps	Goals
Barra da Tijuca	2014	CB1	0	0	0	0	—		—		8	0	8	0
Barra da Tijuca	2016	CB1	0	0	0	0	—		—		15	1	15	1
Barra da Tijuca	Total		0	0	0	0	0	0	0	0	23	1	23	1
Madureira (loan)	2016	Série D	4	0	7	0	—		—		0	0	11	0
Madureira (loan)	2017	CA1	0	0	0	0	—		—		8	0	8	0
Madureira (loan)	Total		4	0	7	0	0	0	0	0	8	0	19	0
Boa (loan)	2017	Série B	25	0	0	0	—		—		0	0	25	0
Internacional (loan)	2018	Série A	0	0	1	0	—		—		6 (Note: Campeonato Gaúcho)	0	7	0
Ponte Preta (loan)	2018	Série B	17	0	0	0	—		—		0	0	17	0
Orlando City (loan)	2019	MLS	25	0	3	0	—		—		—		28	0
Orlando City	2020	MLS	21	0	—		—		1	0	4 (Note: MLS is Back Tournament knockout stage)	0	26	0
Orlando City	2021	MLS	24	2	—		1 (Note: Leagues Cup)	0	1	0	—		26	2
Orlando City	2022	MLS	31	2	6	0	—		1	0	—		38	2
Orlando City	Total		76	4	6	0	1	0	3	0	4	0	90	4
Career total			147	4	17	0	1	0	3	0	41	1	209	5

== Honours ==
Orlando City

- U.S. Open Cup: 2022
