= Benji Michel =

American soccer player (born 1997)

Personal information
- Full name: Benjamin Stanley Michel
- Date of birth: 23 October 1997 (age 29)
- Place of birth: Orlando, Florida, United States
- Height: 1.77 m (5 ft 10 in)
- Position: Winger

Team information
- Current team: Ulsan HD
- Number: 91

Youth career
- 2013–2016: Orlando City
- 2016: Montverde Academy

College career
Years	Team	Apps	(Gls)
2016–2018	Portland Pilots	53	(31)

Senior career*
Years	Team	Apps	(Gls)
2019–2022	Orlando City	103	(15)
2023–2024	Arouca	17	(1)
2024	Real Salt Lake	2	(0)
2024	Real Monarchs	2	(0)
2025–2026	HJK	29	(8)
2026–	Ulsan HD	11	(0)

International career^{‡}
2021	United States U23	3	(0)
- * Club domestic league appearances and goals as of July 10, 2026 ‡ National team caps and goals as of March 24, 2021

Benjamin Stanley "Benji" Michel (born October 23, 1997) is an American professional soccer player who plays for K League 1 club Ulsan HD.

== Club career ==
=== Youth and college ===
Michel grew up in Orlando, Florida, and played for the Orlando City U-18s, where he scored 25 goals for the U.S. Development Academy. While at Montverde, Michel helped the team build on a record 136-game unbeaten streak, which started in 2010.

He played college soccer at the University of Portland from 2016 to 2018, scoring 31 goals in 53 matches. In his freshman year, Michel was named West Coast Conference (WCC) Freshman of the Year. In 2018, he was named to the USC All-American Second Team and was the first Pilot since 2002 to be named an All-American by the United Soccer Coaches.

In May 2018, Michel featured twice for Portland Timbers U23s during their U.S. Open Cup campaign.

=== Orlando City ===
On December 31, 2018, Orlando City announced the signing of Michel to a Homegrown contract. He became the club's fifth homegrown player and the first to be born in Orlando and come up through the Development Academy. He made his professional debut as a substitute on March 31, 2019, in a 2–1 defeat to D.C. United. On June 19, Michel scored his first professional goal in extra-time of Orlando's 2–1 U.S. Open Cup win over New England Revolution. He scored his first MLS goal on July 13, 2019, in a 1–0 victory over Columbus Crew. In July 2019, Michel was selected to take part in the MLS Homegrown Game. He left Orlando upon the expiration of his contract at the end of the 2022 season. On November 6, 2020, Michel was awarded Goal of the Week due to his winning goal against Columbus Crew in a 2–1 victory two days earlier.

=== Arouca ===
On January 6, 2023, Michel officially joined Portuguese side Arouca, signing a contract until June 2025. On January 15, 2023, Michel made his debut in a 1–1 draw against Chaves, entering the match at the 68th minute. Five days later, Michel scored his first goal in a 4–0 win over Portimonense.

=== Real Salt Lake ===
On July 19, 2024, Michel returned to the United States, joining Real Salt Lake for the remainder of the 2024 season in exchange for a 2nd round 2025 MLS SuperDraft selection and $50,000 in 2026 General Allocation Money.

=== HJK Helsinki ===
On March 28, 2025, Michel signed with Finnish Veikkausliiga club HJK Helsinki on a two-year deal. On 26 April, Michel scored his first goal in Veikkausliiga, in a 3–1 home win over VPS.

== International career ==
Although born in Orlando, Florida, Michel is also eligible to play for Haiti through his Haitian parentage.

On March 12, 2019, Michel received his first call up to the Haitian national team for their final CONCACAF Nations League qualifying match against Cuba. However, he declined the call up. On May 20, 2019, Michel was added to Haiti's preliminary 2019 Gold Cup roster.

In June 2019, Michel was called into the United States under-23 Summer Training Camp by Jason Kreis. In January 2021, Michel was called up to the senior United States national team for the first time for a friendly against Trinidad and Tobago but was an unused substitute. Michel was named to the final 20-player United States under-23 roster for the 2020 CONCACAF Men's Olympic Qualifying Championship in March 2021.

== Career statistics ==
As of 20 July 2025

Club	Season	League			National cup (Note: Includes U.S. Open Cup, Taça de Portugal and Suomen Cup)		League cup (Note: Includes MLS Cup Playoffs, Taça da Liga and Finnish League Cup)		Continental		Other		Total	
Club	Season	Division	Apps	Goals	Apps	Goals	Apps	Goals	Apps	Goals	Apps	Goals	Apps	Goals
Orlando City	2019	MLS	17	5	3	1	—		—		—		20	6
Orlando City	2020	MLS	21	5	—		2	0	—		3 (Note: Appearances in MLS is Back Tournament knockout stage)	1	26	6
Orlando City	2021	MLS	34	4	—		1	0	—		1 (Note: Appearances in Leagues Cup)	0	36	4
Orlando City	2022	MLS	31	1	4	2	1	0	—		—		36	3
Orlando City	Total		103	15	7	3	4	0	0	0	4	1	118	19
Arouca	2022–23	Primeira Liga	12	1	—		1	0	—		—		13	1
Arouca	2023–24	Primeira Liga	5	0	1	0	—		—		—		6	0
Arouca	Total		17	1	1	0	1	0	—		—		19	1
Real Salt Lake	2024	MLS	2	0	0	0	–		–		2	0	4	0
Real Monarchs	2024	MLS Next Pro	2	0	–		–		–		–		2	0
HJK Helsinki	2025	Veikkausliiga	14	4	2	1	0	0	2 (Note: Appearances in UEFA Conference League)	0	–		18	5
Career total			138	20	10	4	5	0	2	0	6	1	161	25

== Honors ==
HJK

- Finnish Cup: 2025

Orlando City

- U.S. Open Cup: 2022

Individual

- Veikkausliiga Player of the Month: July 2025
