= Antônio Carlos (footballer, born 1993) =

Brazilian footballer (born 1993)

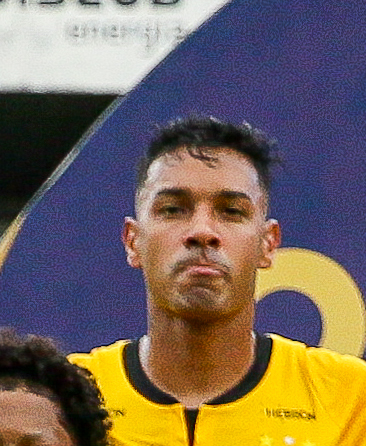
- Antônio Carlos in 2025

Personal information
- Full name: Antônio Carlos Cunha Capocasali Júnior
- Date of birth: 7 March 1993 (age 33)
- Place of birth: Rio de Janeiro, Brazil
- Height: 1.91 m (6 ft 3 in)
- Position: Centre-back

Team information
- Current team: Houston Dynamo
- Number: 3

Youth career
- 2002–2007: Fluminense
- 2009: Sendas
- 2010–2012: Audax-SP
- 2011–2012: → Corinthians (loan)

Senior career*
Years	Team	Apps	(Gls)
2012–2014	Corinthians	3	(0)
2013	→ Oeste (loan)	1	(0)
2014	→ Avaí (loan)	32	(2)
2015–2018	Tombense	0	(0)
2015	→ Avaí (loan)	29	(1)
2016	→ Flamengo (loan)	0	(0)
2016	→ Ponte Preta (loan)	14	(1)
2017–2018	→ Palmeiras (loan)	5	(0)
2018–2021	Palmeiras	31	(1)
2020	→ Orlando City (loan)	20	(1)
2021–2023	Orlando City	68	(3)
2023–2025	Fluminense	24	(0)
2025	→ Sport Recife (loan)	12	(0)
2025–	Houston Dynamo	29	(1)

International career^{‡}
2012	Brazil U20	0	(0)
- * Club domestic league appearances and goals as of 1:17, 2 November 2026 (UTC) ‡ National team caps and goals as of 06:10, 14 March 2026 (UTC)

Antônio Carlos Cunha Capocasali Júnior (born 7 March 1993), known as Antônio Carlos, is a Brazilian footballer who plays as a central defender for Houston Dynamo.

== Club career ==
=== Early years ===
Growing up in the Coelho Neto neighbourhood of northern Rio de Janeiro, Antônio Carlos began his youth career at Fluminense and won three youth Carioca titles before questions over his height meant he was released. In search of first team opportunities as a teenager, Carlos turned to non-league team Sendas, winning the Copa Rio in 2010.

=== Corinthians ===
In 2011, Carlos joined the youth setup at Corinthians initially on a loan deal before Corinthians bought 40% of his economic rights from Audax. He first appeared in a friendly against Osasco. Scoring twice in a 2–1 win over former-team Fluminense in the 2012 São Paulo Youth Cup final, he was promoted to the main squad a month later and made his professional debut on 10 March 2012, starting in a 1–1 home draw against Guarani for the Campeonato Paulista championship.

Antônio Carlos had subsequent loan spells with Série B teams Oeste and Avaí before being released at the end of 2014.

=== Tombense ===
Antônio Carlos signed as a free agent with Tombense, a Série C team owned by Eduardo Uram, one of the leading agents in Brazil. From Tombense, Carlos was loaned to multiple Série A teams, first back to Avaí and then Flamengo, Ponte Preta and Palmeiras.

=== Palmeiras ===
Antônio Carlos' one-year loan deal with Palmeiras in 2017 was initially extended by the club for the start of the 2018 season before they decided to permanently purchase 50% of his economic rights in July 2018, signed the defender until June 2023. Carlos made 22 appearances in Série A as Palmeiras won the title in 2018.

==== Loan to Orlando City ====
On 30 December 2019, Carlos joined MLS team Orlando City on loan ahead of the 2020 season. He made his debut for the team in the season opener on 29 February as the team kept clean sheet in a 0–0 draw against Real Salt Lake. He scored his first goal for the team on 3 October 2020 in a 3–1 win over New York Red Bulls.

=== Orlando City ===
On 1 December 2020, Carlos made the move to Orlando City permanent ahead of the 2021 season.

=== Fluminense ===
On 16 December 2023, Orlando City announced the sale of Carlos for an undisclosed fee to Fluminense.

=== Houston Dynamo ===
On 30 July 2025, Carlos returned to the United States and joined Houston Dynamo.

== International career ==
In March 2012, Antônio Carlos was called up to the Brazil U20s to compete in the International Mediterranean Cup in Barcelona, Spain. In March 2013, he was again called up, this time to play in the 2013 South American Youth Football Championship in Argentina but was a last minute cut after the coaching staff decided to add Jordi Almeida, a third goalkeeper, to the squad instead.

== Career statistics ==
As of match played 8 November 2023

Appearances and goals by club, season and competition
Club	Season	League			National cup		Continental		Playoffs		Other		Total	
Club	Season	Division	Apps	Goals	Apps	Goals	Apps	Goals	Apps	Goals	Apps	Goals	Apps	Goals
Corinthians	2012	Série A	3	0	0	0	0	0	—		2	0	5	0
Oeste (loan)	2013	Série B	1	0	0	0	—		—		10	0	11	0
Avaí (loan)	2014	Série B	32	2	0	0	—		—		16	1	48	3
Tombense	2015	Série C	0	0	0	0	—		—		0	0	0	0
Avaí (loan)	2015	Série A	29	1	3	0	—		—		9	1	41	2
Flamengo (loan)	2016	Série A	0	0	0	0	0	0	—		0	0	0	0
Ponte Preta (loan)	2016	Série A	14	1	1	0	—		—		0	0	15	1
Palmeiras (loan)	2017	Série A	5	0	0	0	1	0	—		2	0	8	0
Palmeiras	2018	Série A	22	1	6	0	8	0	—		16	2	52	3
Palmeiras	2019	Série A	9	0	2	0	3	0	—		9	0	23	0
Palmeiras	Total		36	1	8	0	12	0	0	0	27	2	83	3
Orlando City (loan)	2020	MLS	20	1	—		—		2	0	4 (Note: MLS is Back Tournament knockout stage)	0	26	1
Orlando City	2021	MLS	29	2	—		—		1	0	1 (Note: Leagues Cup)	0	31	2
Orlando City	2022	MLS	21	0	3	0	—		1	0	—		25	0
Orlando City	2023	MLS	18	1	0	0	0	0	3	0	3 (Note: Leagues Cup)	0	24	1
Orlando City	Total		88	4	3	0	0	0	7	0	8	0	106	4
Career total			203	9	15	0	12	0	6	0	72	4	309	13

== Honours ==
Sendas

- Copa Rio: 2010

Corinthians

- Copa São Paulo de Futebol Júnior: 2012

Palmeiras

- Campeonato Brasileiro Série A: 2018

Orlando City

- U.S. Open Cup: 2022

Fluminense

- Recopa Sudamericana: 2024

Individual

- Campeonato Paulista Team of the year: 2018
