= Mauricio Pereyra =

Uruguayan footballer (born 1990)

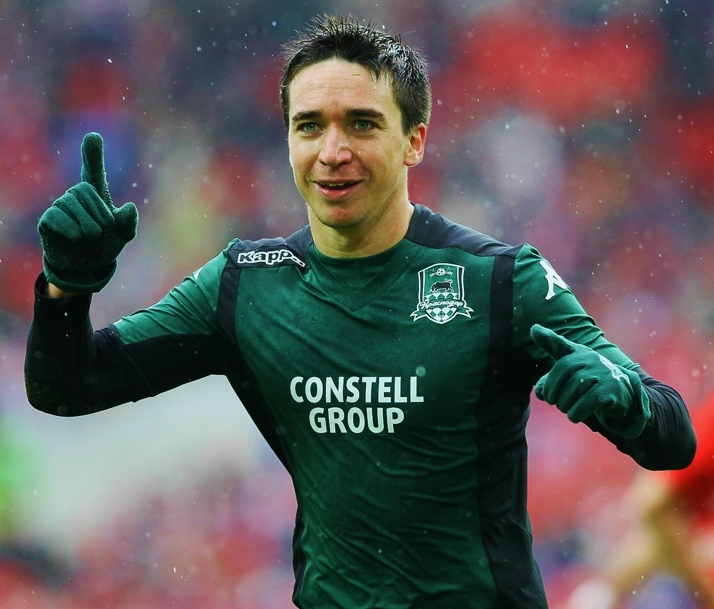
- Pereyra with Krasnodar in 2015

Personal information
- Full name: Mauricio Ernesto Pereyra Antonini
- Date of birth: 15 March 1990 (age 36)
- Place of birth: Montevideo, Uruguay
- Height: 1.70 m (5 ft 7 in)
- Position: Attacking midfielder

Youth career
- 2007–2008: Nacional

Senior career*
Years	Team	Apps	(Gls)
2009–2011	Nacional	45	(3)
2011–2013	Lanús	47	(3)
2013–2019	Krasnodar	154	(23)
2019–2023	Orlando City	114	(4)
2024–2025	Nacional	51	(3)
Total		414	(36)

International career
2009	Uruguay U20	12	(0)
- * Club domestic league appearances and goals

Mauricio Ernesto Pereyra Antonini (born 15 March 1990) is a Uruguayan former professional footballer who played as an attacking midfielder.

== Career ==
=== Nacional ===
Pereyra made his professional debut for Nacional in a 2009 Copa Libertadores qualifying match against Paraguayan Club Nacional, on 18 February 2009.

=== Lanús ===
On 2 August 2011, Pereyra joined Lanús of Argentina for a fee of US$1,300,000. On 26 September 2011 he scored his first goal in the 1–1 home draw against Club Atlético Colón.

=== Krasnodar ===
On 24 February 2013, Pereyra signed for Krasnodar on a three-and-a-half-year contract, extending his contract on 30 April 2015, until the summer of 2019.

On 20 May 2019, FC Krasnodar confirmed that Pereyra will leave the club after his contract expires at the end of the 2018–19 season.

=== Orlando City ===
On 30 July 2019, Orlando City announced they had signed Pereyra, initially to a Designated Player contract. He made his debut for the team on 17 August 2019, appearing as a half-time substitute in a 1–1 draw away to Minnesota United. He scored his first goal for the club on 20 July 2020 in a 1–1 draw against Philadelphia Union during the MLS is Back Tournament. He scored again in the tournament's final on 11 August as Orlando finished runners-up, losing to Portland Timbers 2–1. Ahead of the 2022 season, Pereyra signed a new one-year DP contract with Orlando and was named captain following the offseason departure of Nani. On November 23, 2022, Orlando signed Pereyra to a new two-year contract using allocation money meaning he would no longer occupy a Designated Player slot. Pereyra and Orlando mutually agreed to terminate his contract on 6 December 2023.

=== Return to Nacional ===
In December 2023, it was announced Pereyra would return to Nacional ahead of the 2024 Uruguayan Primera División season, 12 years after he originally departed the club. On 30 November 2025, Nacional defeated Peñarol 3–2 on aggregate following a goal in extra time to win the 2025 Liga AUF Uruguaya title. On 12 December, Pereyra announced his retirement from professional football.

== Personal life ==
Born in Uruguay, Pereyra is of Italian descent and holds dual-citizenship.

== Career statistics ==
=== Club ===
As of match played 23 November 2025

Appearances and goals by club, season and competition
Club	Season	League			National cup		League cup		Continental		Other		Total	
Club	Season	Division	Apps	Goals	Apps	Goals	Apps	Goals	Apps	Goals	Apps	Goals	Apps	Goals
Nacional	2009–10	Uruguayan; Primera División	19	1	—		—		11	1	—		30	2
Nacional	2010–11	Uruguayan; Primera División	26	2	—		—		5	0	—		31	2
Nacional	Total		45	3	0	0	0	0	16	1	0	0	61	4
Lanús	2011–12	Argentine; Primera División	28	1	1	0	—		5	0	—		34	1
Lanús	2012–13	Argentine; Primera División	19	2	0	0	—		—		—		19	2
Lanús	Total		47	3	1	0	0	0	5	0	0	0	53	3
Krasnodar	2012–13	Russian; Premier League	9	1	0	0	—		—		—		9	1
Krasnodar	2013–14	Russian; Premier League	24	6	3	0	—		—		—		27	6
Krasnodar	2014–15	Russian; Premier League	27	9	0	0	—		11	2	—		38	11
Krasnodar	2015–16	Russian; Premier League	20	1	2	0	—		6	1	—		28	2
Krasnodar	2016–17	Russian; Premier League	21	2	0	0	—		10	0	—		31	2
Krasnodar	2017–18	Russian; Premier League	27	1	0	0	—		3	2	—		30	3
Krasnodar	2018–19	Russian; Premier League	25	3	3	0	—		9	1	—		37	4
Krasnodar	Total		154	23	8	0	0	0	38	6	0	0	200	29
Orlando City	2019	MLS	6	0	0	0	—		—		—		6	0
Orlando City	2020	MLS	16	2	—		2	0	—		4 (Note: MLS is Back Tournament knockout stage)	1	22	3
Orlando City	2021	MLS	29	1	—		1	0	—		1 (Note: Leagues Cup)	0	31	1
Orlando City	2022	MLS	32	1	6	1	1	0	—		—		39	2
Orlando City	2023	MLS	31	0	0	0	3	0	2	0	2	1	38	1
Orlando City	Total		114	4	6	1	7	0	2	0	7	2	136	7
Nacional	2024	Uruguayan; Primera División	28	3	1	0	—		11	0	—		40	3
Nacional	2025	Liga AUF Uruguaya	23	0	0	0	—		2	0	—		25	0
Nacional	Total		51	3	1	0	0	0	13	0	0	0	65	3
Career total			414	36	16	1	10	0	74	7	7	2	515	46

== Honours ==
Nacional

- Uruguayan Primera División (3): 2008–09, 2010–11, 2025

Orlando City

- U.S. Open Cup: 2022
