= Shak Mohammed =

Ghanaian footballer (born 2003)

- Mohammed with Nashville SC in 2026

Personal information
- Full name: Abdul Shakur Mohammed
- Date of birth: 27 August 2003 (age 23)
- Place of birth: Kumasi, Ghana
- Height: 5 ft 10 in (1.78 m)
- Positions: Right winger; right midfielder

Team information
- Current team: Nashville SC
- Number: 14

Youth career
- Right to Dream Academy
- Black Rock FC

College career
Years	Team	Apps	(Gls)
2021–2022	Duke Blue Devils	37	(13)

Senior career*
Years	Team	Apps	(Gls)
2022	Manhattan SC	4	(0)
2023–2025	Orlando City	4	(0)
2023–2025	→ Orlando City B (loan)	77	(28)
2026–	Nashville SC	22	(4)
2026–	→ Huntsville City FC (loan)	3	(3)
- * Club domestic league appearances and goals as of 00:07, 8 November 2026 (UTC)

Abdul Shakur Mohammed (born 27 August 2003) is a Ghanaian professional footballer who plays as a right winger and right midfielder for Major League Soccer club Nashville SC.

A Right to Dream Academy graduate, Mohammed played college soccer for two seasons at Duke University before being selected by Orlando City as the second-overall pick in the 2023 MLS SuperDraft.

== Early life ==
=== Youth career ===
Born in Kumasi, Ghana, Mohammed graduated from the Right to Dream Academy before emigrating to the United States to complete his high school studies at Millbrook School in Stanford, New York. While at Millbrook he helped lead the school's soccer team to the Class C New England Preparatory School Athletic Council (NEPSAC) Championship in 2018. He also played club soccer at Black Rock FC. In July 2020, Mohammed verbally committed to Duke University and took summer classes to accelerate his high school graduation.

=== College career ===
Mohammed played two seasons of college soccer as a two-year starter for the Duke Blue Devils between 2021 and 2022. As a freshman he totaled three goals and seven assists in 18 appearances. Duke reached the 2021 ACC tournament final before losing 2–0 to Notre Dame Fighting Irish. Individually he was named ACC Freshman of the Year as well as All-ACC Second Team. TopDrawerSoccer named him to the Freshman Best XI.

In his second season, Mohammed started all 19 of Duke's games and led the team in scoring with 10 goals as well as registering two assists. He was named ACC Offensive Player of the Year, earned All-ACC First Team and All-American First Team honours, and was a Hermann Trophy semi-finalist.

== Club career ==
=== Manhattan SC ===
While at college, Mohammed also played for Manhattan SC during the 2022 USL League Two season. On 15 June, Mohammed made his club debut against the Long Island Rough Riders, assisting in the lone winning goal and marking his only goal contribution for the team. In total, Mohammed made five appearances, including one in the playoffs, as the team topped the Metropolitan Division.

=== Orlando City ===
In December 2022, Mohammed declared early for the 2023 MLS SuperDraft, signing a Generation Adidas contract with Major League Soccer to forgo the remainder of his college eligibility. He was drafted in the first round (2nd overall) by Orlando City after the club traded away Ruan to D.C. United earlier in the day to acquire the pick. On 26 March 2023, Mohammed made his professional debut with the reserve team, Orlando City B, when he came on for Cristofer Acuña in the 67th-minute of a 3–1 win at Philadelphia Union II. On 29 May, Mohammed scored his first goal for the reserve side when he netted the deciding goal of a 3–2 win over New York Red Bulls II. In Mohammed's debut season with the reserve team, he scored six goals and made four assists across 25 appearances, making him the second highest goalscorer and goal contributor for the team behind Jack Lynn.

On 27 February 2024, Mohammed made his debut for the club in round one of the 2024 CONCACAF Champions Cup when he started in a 3–1 win over Cavalry FC before he came off in the 46-minute for César Araújo. On 18 March, Mohammed made his league debut for the senior team when he came on as an 87th-minute substitute for Nicolás Lodeiro in a 2–0 loss to Atlanta United. In the 2024 season, Mohammed tallied 11 goals and two assists across 27 appearances, making him the top goalscorer for the reserve side and third highest goal contributor behind Alex Freeman and Yutaro Tsukada.

In the 2025 season for the reserve team, Mohammed finished as the top goalscorer for the team for a second consecutive season with 11 goals, but made zero assists, across 27 appearances. Mohammed placed second behind Justin Ellis for the most goal contributions across the season for the team. After the conclusion of the season, Orlando City opted not to extend his contract.

=== Nashville SC ===
On 7 January 2026, Orlando City announced that they had acquired Nashville SC's natural third-round pick in the 2027 MLS SuperDraft in exchange for Orlando's right of first refusal on Mohammed. Later the same day, Nashville SC signed Mohammed through the 2026 season with a team option for the 2027 and 2027–28 seasons. Upon joining Nashville SC, Mohammed was reunited with his childhood friend Maxwell Woledzi, who was also a player at the club. The pair had developed together in the Right to Dream Academy. Mohammed made his Nashville SC debut as a substitute in their CONCACAF Champions Cup second leg tie against Atlético Ottawa on 24 February. Mohammed provided his first goal contribution for the club, an assist to Ahmed Qasem, to win the game 5–0 and 7–0 on aggregate. On 2 March, Mohammed made his debut for and scored two goals for Nashville SC's MLS Next Pro affiliate, Huntsville City FC, in a 3–1 win over his former club Orlando City B. Mohammed made his league debut for Nashville SC on 18 April, and scored his first Major League Soccer goal in a 2–0 win at Atlanta United. On 2 May, Mohammed made his first Major League Soccer start in a scoreless draw against the Philadelphia Union. Mohammed made his second start on 17 July in another match against Atlanta United and scored the only goal of the game. On 10 October, Mohammed scored and assisted in a 4–1 win over Austin FC, a performance which would see him named to the Team of the Matchday bench for the first time in his career.

== Personal life ==
Mohammed comes from a family of five. Mohammed's mother sold goods in the markets in Kumasi in order to provide for her family. Mohammed said that where he grew up, people did not have "vision about life" and that people had "no idea" where their lives were going to be the "next day" or "even the next minute". Mohammed also said that seeing people becomes "failures" motivated him to have a "bigger vision" so that he could "make it out".

Mohammed would play football throughout the weekend, and would forgo eating in order to play longer. While playing, Mohammed played barefoot and described it as a "humbling experience" because it showed that he and the other players enjoyed playing football so much that they would risk injuring their feet, but he also said that it "enhances your technique" because of the lower control and grip of the ball that resulted. In order to get their hands on a ball to play with, Mohammed and the other players would either have to get "fortunate" that one of the participants' parents were wealthy enough to own one, or they'd pool their money together in order to purchase one.

When Mohammed moved to the United States, he stayed with a foster family. Mohammed said that his foster family "for sure became a family to me" and that they filled in a part of his life that was "missing" from when he first moved to the country. Mohammed is a Muslim, and he said that to him, Islam "is a religion that teaches tranquility" and that he "always wanted to live with those principles" while growing up.

== Career statistics ==
=== College ===
Team	Season	ACC regular season			ACC Tournament		NCAA Tournament		Total	
Team	Season	Division	Apps	Goals	Apps	Goals	Apps	Goals	Apps	Goals
Duke Blue Devils	2021	Div. I	13	3	3	0	2	0	18	3
Duke Blue Devils	2022	Div. I	15	9	1	0	3	1	19	10
Career total			28	12	4	0	5	1	37	13

=== Club ===
As of 7 November 2026

Club	Season	League			U.S. Open Cup		North America		Playoffs		Other		Total	
Club	Season	Division	Apps	Goals	Apps	Goals	Apps	Goals	Apps	Goals	Apps	Goals	Apps	Goals
Manhattan SC	2022	USL League Two	4	0	—		—		1	0	—		5	0
Orlando City	2023	Major League Soccer	0	0	0	0	0	0	0	0	0	0	0	0
Orlando City	2024	Major League Soccer	2	0	—		1	0	0	0	0	0	3	0
Orlando City	2025	Major League Soccer	2	0	0	0	—		0	0	0	0	2	0
Orlando City	Total		4	0	0	0	1	0	0	0	0	0	5	0
Orlando City B (loan)	2023	MLS Next Pro	24	6	—		—		1	0	—		25	6
Orlando City B (loan)	2024	MLS Next Pro	26	11	—		—		1	0	—		27	11
Orlando City B (loan)	2025	MLS Next Pro	27	11	—		—		—		—		27	11
Orlando City B (loan)	Total		77	28	0	0	0	0	2	0	0	0	80	28
Nashville SC	2026	Major League Soccer	22	4	—		2	0	0	0	3 (Note: Appearances in Leagues Cup)	0	27	4
Huntsville City FC (loan)	2026	MLS Next Pro	3	3	—		—		—		—		3	3
Career total			110	35	0	0	3	0	3	0	3	0	119	35

== Honours ==
Nashville SC

- Supporters' Shield: 2026

Manhattan SC

- USL League Two Metropolitan Division: 2022

Individual

- ACC Freshman of the Year: 2021
- ACC Offensive Player of the Year: 2022
- NCAA First Team All-America: 2022
- All-ACC First Team: 2022
