= Sam Surridge =

English footballer (born 1998)

- Surridge with Nashville SC in 2026

Personal information
- Full name: Samuel William Surridge
- Date of birth: 28 July 1998 (age 28)
- Place of birth: Slough, Berkshire, England
- Height: 6 ft 3 in (1.91 m)
- Position: Striker

Team information
- Current team: Nashville SC
- Number: 9

Youth career
- 200?–2012: Bournemouth Sports
- 2012–2015: AFC Bournemouth

Senior career*
Years	Team	Apps	(Gls)
2015–2021	AFC Bournemouth	35	(4)
2015–2016	→ Weymouth (loan)	7	(1)
2016	→ Poole Town (loan)	12	(7)
2017–2018	→ Yeovil Town (loan)	41	(8)
2018–2019	→ Oldham Athletic (loan)	15	(8)
2019–2020	→ Swansea City (loan)	20	(4)
2021–2022	Stoke City	20	(2)
2022–2023	Nottingham Forest	37	(8)
2023–	Nashville SC	99	(59)

International career
2019–2020	England U21	3	(1)
- * Club domestic league appearances and goals as of 03:20, 8 November 2026 (UTC)

Samuel William Surridge (born 28 July 1998) is an English professional footballer who plays as a striker for Major League Soccer club Nashville SC.

== Club career ==
=== Early career ===
Surridge was born in Slough, Berkshire, and moved to Ferndown, Dorset, at the age of seven. He joined the AFC Bournemouth academy at the age of 14 from local club Bournemouth Sports.

=== AFC Bournemouth ===
Surridge returned to the Cherries academy when he joined the under-15s and was soon offered a scholarship, scoring freely for the club's youth team, before impressing during a productive loan spell with Poole Town during their debut season in the National League South in the 2016–17 season.

==== League Two loans and Premier League debut ====
On 3 August 2017, Surridge joined League Two club Yeovil Town on loan until the end of the season. Surridge made his Football League debut as a second-half substitute for Yeovil against Luton Town, on 5 August 2017. He scored his first goal for Yeovil in an EFL Trophy tie against Exeter City on 29 August 2017. Surridge finished the season with Yeovil having scored 10 goals in 53 total appearances across all competitions for the club.

On 30 July 2018, Surridge joined League Two club Oldham Athletic on a season-long loan deal. Five goals from four matches in September earned him the League Two Player of the Month award, and by 6 January, he had twelve goals from twenty appearances in all competitions. Surridge scored against Premier League opposition in the third round of the FA Cup, scoring a penalty as Oldham came from behind to beat Fulham 2–1. He was then recalled by his parent club in early January.

Surridge made his Premier League debut for the Cherries in a 5–1 loss to Arsenal on 28 February 2019, replacing Ryan Fraser on the 80-minute mark. Surridge was awarded the club award for Under-21 Player of the Year on 14 May 2019, after a fruitful loan spell at Oldham Athletic and making his Premier League debut for the club against Arsenal.

==== Loan to Swansea City and first-team breakthrough ====
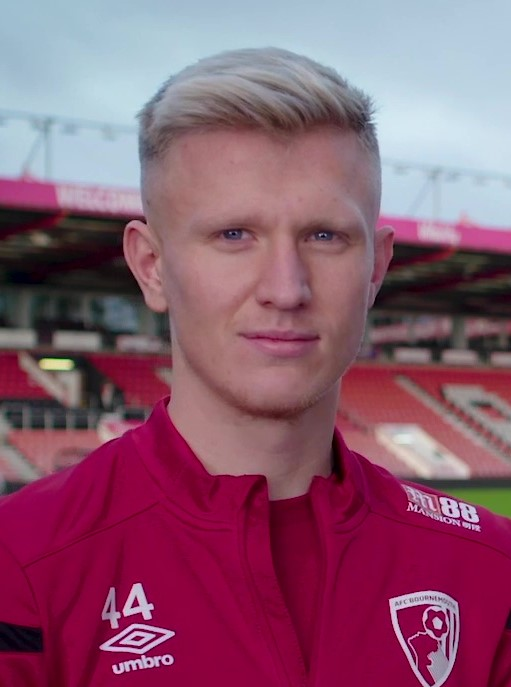
Surridge with AFC Bournemouth in 2020

On 6 August 2019, Championship club Swansea City signed Surridge on a season-long loan deal. He scored his first Swansea goal in a 3–1 away win at Queens Park Rangers on 21 August 2019 before being recalled on 1 January 2020 by AFC Bournemouth. Surridge finished the season with Swansea having scored 7 goals in 23 total appearances across all competitions for the club.

Surridge signed a new contract with the Cherries in early January 2020, a four-and-a-half-year deal that would keep him with the club until the summer of 2024. He scored his first professional goal for the Cherries in the FA Cup fourth round, with a late goal against Arsenal in a 2–1 defeat on 27 January 2020. Surridge was thought to have scored his first Premier League goal for the club, equalising 1–1 in the penultimate game of the 2019–20 season against south coast rivals Southampton. However, it was ruled out by VAR due to teammate Callum Wilson adjudged as being in an offside position. The game finished 2–0 to Southampton. Surridge was described by Cherries coach Mark Molesley as being the perfect example to loan players at non-league clubs in how to make the grade, citing his successes in loan spells at non-league level and football league clubs like Yeovil, Oldham and Swansea as being evidence of Surridge "climbing the ladder and earning his stripes".

=== Stoke City ===
On 4 August 2021, Surridge joined Stoke City on a four-year contract for an undisclosed fee. Surridge scored the winning goal on his debut three days later in a home match against Reading. He scored in the first two rounds of the EFL Cup against Fleetwood Town and Doncaster Rovers and in the league against Barnsley. He then failed to find the net in his next 15 appearances and was sent-off against Peterborough United following an altercation with Josh Knight. He was allowed to leave Stoke in the January transfer window just six months after joining by manager Michael O'Neill who stated that Surridge had struggled to settle into the team. "He got off to a decent start, scored on his debut and the early games were very promising but his form suffered a little bit after that and I think generally he struggled to settle at the club. Sometimes that happens".

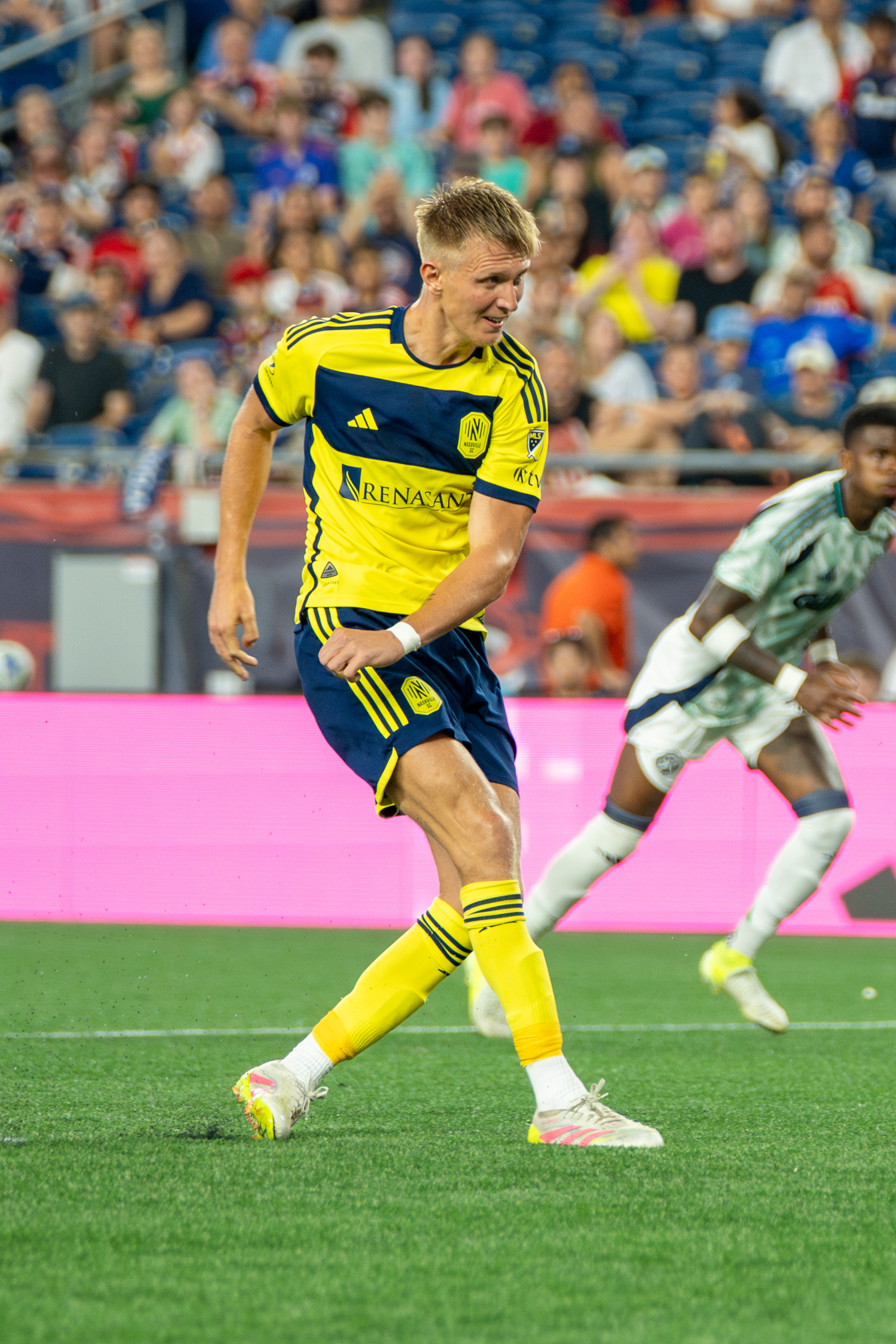
Surridge with Nashville SC in 2025

=== Nottingham Forest ===
On 31 January 2022, Surridge joined Nottingham Forest for an undisclosed fee. The transfer fee was reported to be £2.2 million. He made his debut for the club on 6 February, coming off the bench on the 71st minute of a 4–1 home win over Premier League side Leicester City in the 4th round of the FA Cup. On 7 March, on the next round of the tournament, Surridge scored his first goal for Forest, in a 2–1 home win over Huddersfield Town. In the second half of the 2021–22 season, Surridge scored 7 goals in 20 appearances for Forest in the Championship, helping the club achieve promotion to the Premier League via the play-offs.

The following season, with Nottingham Forest in the Premier League, Surridge made 20 league appearances, with only 1 of those as a starter. He scored just 1 league goal, on 21 January 2023, in a 1–1 draw away at Bournemouth.

=== Nashville SC ===
On 25 July 2023, Major League Soccer side Nashville SC announced the signing of Surridge as a Designated Player, for a reported fee of $6.5 million (around £5 million). The striker signed a contract until 2026, with an option to extend it for the 2027 season. On 4 May 2024, Surridge knocked in a hat-trick in a 4–1 win over CF Montréal, the second player to do so in the club's history after Hany Mukhtar. On 26 April 2025, Surridge scored four times during a 7–2 win over Chicago Fire. On 16 September 2025, Surridge scored a hat-trick in a 3–1 victory against Philadelphia Union in the U.S. Open Cup semi-final, sending his team to their first ever U.S. Open Cup final. Nashville were victorious in the final, as Surridge scored the winning goal from the penalty spot.

== International career ==
On 8 October 2019, Surridge received his first call up to the England U21 squad, and made a goalscoring debut during a 2–2 draw against Slovenia in Maribor on 11 October 2019.

== Career statistics ==
As of match played 7 November 2026

Appearances and goals by club, season and competition
Club	Season	League			National cup (Note: Includes FA Cup, U.S. Open Cup)		League cup (Note: Includes EFL Cup)		Continental		Other		Total	
Club	Season	Division	Apps	Goals	Apps	Goals	Apps	Goals	Apps	Goals	Apps	Goals	Apps	Goals
AFC Bournemouth	2015–16	Premier League	0	0	0	0	0	0	—		—		0	0
AFC Bournemouth	2016–17	Premier League	0	0	0	0	0	0	—		—		0	0
AFC Bournemouth	2017–18	Premier League	0	0	0	0	0	0	—		—		0	0
AFC Bournemouth	2018–19	Premier League	2	0	0	0	0	0	—		—		2	0
AFC Bournemouth	2019–20	Premier League	4	0	1	1	0	0	—		—		5	1
AFC Bournemouth	2020–21	Championship	29	4	4	1	2	1	—		0	0	35	6
AFC Bournemouth	Total		35	4	5	2	2	1	—		0	0	42	7
Weymouth (loan)	2015–16	SL Premier Division	7	1	—		—		—		—		7	1
Poole Town (loan)	2016–17	National League South	12	7	—		—		—		3 (Note: Two appearances in FA Trophy, one appearance and one goal in Dorset Senior Cup)	1	15	8
Yeovil Town (loan)	2017–18	League Two	41	8	4	0	1	0	—		7 (Note: Appearances in EFL Trophy)	2	53	10
Oldham Athletic (loan)	2018–19	League Two	15	8	2	1	0	0	—		3	3	20	12
Swansea City (loan)	2019–20	Championship	20	4	0	0	3	3	—		—		23	7
Stoke City	2021–22	Championship	20	2	0	0	4	2	—		—		24	4
Nottingham Forest	2021–22	Championship	17	7	3	1	—		—		3 (Note: Appearances in Championship play-offs)	0	23	8
Nottingham Forest	2022–23	Premier League	20	1	1	0	6	2	—		—		27	3
Nottingham Forest	Total		37	8	4	1	6	2	—		3	0	50	11
Nashville SC	2023	Major League Soccer	9	2	—		—		—		6 (Note: Four appearances and three goals in Leagues Cup, two appearances in MLS Cup playoffs)	3	15	5
Nashville SC	2024	Major League Soccer	28	12	—		—		2 (Note: Appearances in CONCACAF Champions Cup)	2	2 (Note: Appearances in Leagues Cup)	1	32	15
Nashville SC	2025	Major League Soccer	34	24	3	6	—		—		3 (Note: Appearances in MLS Cup playoffs)	1	40	31
Nashville SC	2026	Major League Soccer	28	21	—		—		4	1	3	1	35	23
Nashville SC	Total		99	59	3	6	—		6	3	14	6	122	74
Career total			286	101	18	10	16	8	6	3	30	12	356	133

== Honours ==
Nottingham Forest

- EFL Championship play-offs: 2022

Nashville SC

- U.S. Open Cup: 2025
- Supporters' Shield: 2026

Individual

- EFL League Two Player of the Month: September 2018
- AFC Bournemouth Under-21 Player of the Year: 2018–19
- MLS All-Star: 2025, 2026
- MLS Player of the Month: February/March 2026
