= 2026 Nashville SC season =

Season of an American soccer team

Nashville SC
2026 season
- General manager: Mike Jacobs
- Head coach: B. J. Callaghan
- Stadium: Geodis Park
- MLS: Conference: 1st Overall: 1st
- MLS Cup playoffs: Round one
- CONCACAF Champions Cup: Semifinals
- Leagues Cup: League phase
- Top goalscorer: League: Sam Surridge (21); All: Sam Surridge (23)
Home colors	Away colors	Third colors

The 2026 Nashville SC season is the seventh season for Nashville SC as a member of Major League Soccer (MLS), the top flight of professional soccer in the United States. It is their ninth overall season, including two years in the second-division USL Championship.

== Preseason ==
January 20 Preseason	Nashville SC	1–4	Chicago Fire FC	Palm Beach Gardens, Florida
10:00 CDT	Brunet 60'	Report	Poreba 5'; Salétros 20'; Zinckernagel 50'; 65' (o.g.)

January 26 Preseason	Colorado Rapids	1–3	Nashville SC	Palm Beach Gardens, Florida
9:30 CDT	Yapi 16'	Report	Mukhtar 36'; Pacius 46'; Madrigal 67'

February 7 Preseason	Orlando City SC	2–2	Nashville SC	Palm Beach Gardens, Florida
11:00 CDT		Report

February 11 Preseason	Nashville SC	1–0	Columbus Crew	Palm Beach Gardens, Florida
10:00 CDT	Bauer 55'	Report

February 14 Preseason	Nashville SC	1–2	Lexington SC	Nashville, Tennessee
14:00 CDT	Espinoza 55'	Report	Epps 43'; Henry-Scott 80'	Stadium: Geodis Park

== Competitions ==
=== Overview ===
Competition	First match	Last match	Starting round	Final position	Record							
Competition	First match	Last match	Starting round	Final position	Pld	W	D	L	GF	GA	GD	Win %
Major League Soccer	February 21	November 7	Matchday 1	Winners	34	23	8	3	71	25	+46	67.65
MLS Cup playoffs	November 22	TBD	Round one	TBD	0	0	0	0	0	0	+0	—
CONCACAF Champions Cup	February 17	May 5	Round one	Semi-finals	8	3	3	2	9	3	+6	37.50
Leagues Cup	August 5	August 12	League phase	League phase	3	1	0	2	5	4	+1	33.33
Total					45	27	11	7	85	32	+53	60.00

Last updated: November 7, 2026
Source: Nashville SC

=== Major League Soccer ===
==== Standings ====
===== Eastern Conference =====
MLS Eastern Conference table (2026)
Pos	Team	Pld	W	L	T	GF	GA	GD	Pts	Qualification
1	Nashville SC	34	23	3	8	71	25	+46	77	Qualification for round one and the CONCACAF Champions Cup round one
2	Inter Miami CF	34	16	6	12	80	59	+21	60	Qualification for round one
3	New England Revolution	34	18	12	4	55	47	+8	58	Qualification for round one
4	Chicago Fire FC	34	16	11	7	64	54	+10	55	Qualification for round one
5	Charlotte FC	34	15	10	9	66	51	+15	54	Qualification for round one

Source: MLS
Rules for classification: 1) points; 2) total wins; 3) total goal differential; 4) total goals scored; 5) fewer disciplinary points; 6) away goal differential; 7) away goals scored; 8) home goals differential; 9) home goals scored; 10) coin toss (2 clubs tied) or drawing of lots (≥3 clubs tied)

===== Overall =====
Overall MLS standings table
Pos	Team	Pld	W	L	T	GF	GA	GD	Pts	Qualification
1	Nashville SC (S)	34	23	3	8	71	25	+46	77	Qualification for the CONCACAF Champions Cup round one (Note: As 2026 MLS Supporters' Shield champions)
2	Vancouver Whitecaps FC	34	19	8	7	74	34	+40	64	Qualification for the CONCACAF Champions Cup round one (Note: As Western Conference regular season winners)
3	Inter Miami CF	34	16	6	12	80	59	+21	60	Qualification for the CONCACAF Champions Cup round one (Note: As one of the next two highest-ranked clubs in 2026 MLS Supporters' Shield not already qualified)
4	New England Revolution	34	18	12	4	55	47	+8	58	Qualification for the CONCACAF Champions Cup round one
5	FC Dallas	34	16	8	10	62	51	+11	58	

Source: MLS
Rules for classification: 1) points; 2) total wins; 3) total goal differential; 4) total goals scored; 5) fewer disciplinary points; 6) away goal differential; 7) away goals scored; 8) home goals differential; 9) home goals scored; 10) coin toss (2 clubs tied) or drawing of lots (≥3 clubs tied)
(S) Supporters' Shield winners

==== Match results ====
The MLS regular season schedule was released on November 20, 2025. Nashville SC played 34 matches—17 at home and 17 away—primarily against opponents from the Eastern Conference. The team also played six matches against teams in the Western Conference.

February 21 1	Nashville SC	4–1	New England Revolution	Nashville, Tennessee
7:30 p.m. CST	Surridge 6', 16'; Mukhtar 39'; Madrigal 49'	Report	Campana 47'; Yow (yellow card) 48'	Stadium: Geodis Park; Attendance: 25,044; Referee: Tori Penso

February 28 2	FC Dallas	0–0	Nashville SC	Frisco, Texas
5:30 p.m. CST	Kaick (yellow card) 51'; Urhoghide (yellow card) 76'; Sarver (yellow card) 90+5'	Report	Corcoran (yellow card) 74' (yellow-red card) 84'; Lovitz (yellow card) 76'	Stadium: Toyota Stadium; Attendance: 11,004; Referee: Sergii Boiko

March 7 3	Nashville SC	3–1	Minnesota United FC	Nashville, Tennessee
5:30 p.m. CST	Surridge 26', 47'; Espinoza 33'; Palacios (yellow card) 81'	Report	Triantis 35'; Gressel (yellow card) 89'	Stadium: Geodis Park; Attendance: 24,387; Referee: Pierre-Luc Lauziere

March 14 4	Columbus Crew	0–1	Nashville SC	Columbus, Ohio
3:00 p.m. CDT	Amundsen (yellow card) 51'	Report	Maher (yellow card) 10'; Qasem (yellow card) 41'; Pacius (yellow card) 42'; Bauer (yellow card) 72'; Nájar (yellow card) 87'; Mukhtar 90+4'	Stadium: ScottsMiracle-Gro Field; Attendance: 19,960; Referee: Fotis Bazakos

March 21 5	Nashville SC	5–0	Orlando City SC	Nashville, Tennessee
3:00 p.m. CDT	Espinoza 5'; Surridge 28' (pen.), 55', 67'; Madrigal 80'; Nájar (yellow card) 83'	Report	Miller (yellow card) 26'; Iago (yellow card) 73'	Stadium: Geodis Park; Attendance: 27,167; Referee: Victor Rivas

April 4 6	Chicago Fire FC	1–0	Nashville SC	Chicago, Illinois
5:30 p.m. CDT	Zinckernagel 1'; Salétros (yellow card) 72'; D'Avilla (yellow card) 78'	Report	Tagseth (yellow card) 80'	Stadium: Soldier Field; Attendance: 15,392; Referee: Marcos de Oliveira

April 11 7	Charlotte FC	1–2	Nashville SC	Charlotte, North Carolina
4:30 p.m. CDT	Goodwin 90' (pen.)	Report	Tagseth 14'; Muyl (yellow card) 35'; Yazbek 62'; Lovitz (yellow card) 64'; Mukhtar (yellow card) 90+2'	Stadium: Bank of America Stadium; Attendance: 26,012; Referee: Rubiel Vazquez

April 18 8	Atlanta United FC	0–2	Nashville SC	Atlanta, Georgia
4:30 p.m. CDT	Muyumba (yellow card) 45+1'; Hoyos (yellow card) 76'	Report	Espinoza 61'; Mohammed 90+1'	Stadium: Mercedes-Benz Stadium; Attendance: 36,895; Referee: Allen Chapman

April 25 9	Nashville SC	4–2	Charlotte FC	Nashville, Tennessee
5:30 p.m. CDT	Mukhtar 19'; Qasem 25'; Surridge 60', 74'; Muyl (yellow card) 78'; Schwake (yellow card) 87'	Report	Agyemang 42'; Biel 68'; Schnegg (yellow card) 85'	Stadium: Geodis Park; Attendance: 30,109; Referee: Joe Dickerson

May 2 10	Philadelphia Union	0–0	Nashville SC	Chester, Pennsylvania
4:30 p.m. CDT	Martínez (yellow card) 64'	Report	Lovitz (yellow card) 90+1'	Stadium: Subaru Park; Attendance: 17,430; Referee: Elijio Arreguin

May 9 11	Nashville SC	2–2	D.C. United	Nashville, Tennessee
6:00 p.m. CDT	Mukhtar (yellow card) 37'; Acosta (yellow card) 55'; Palacios (yellow card) 72'; Madrigal 76', 89'	Report	Munteanu 25'; Bartlett 30'; Hefti (yellow card) 45+3' (yellow-red card) 75'	Stadium: Geodis Park; Attendance: 28,384; Referee: Randy Encarnacion

May 13 12	New England Revolution	0–3	Nashville SC	Foxborough, Massachusetts
4:30 p.m. CDT	Raines (yellow card) 56'; Yusuf (yellow card) 90'	Report	Nájar (yellow card) 23'; Acosta 34', 74'; Corcoran (yellow card) 40'; Madrigal 41'; Lovitz (yellow card) 83'	Stadium: Gillette Stadium; Attendance: 14,287; Referee: Sergii Demianchuk

May 17 13	Nashville SC	3–2	Los Angeles FC	Nashville, Tennessee
5:00 p.m. CDT	Mukhtar 13', 21', 59'; Qasem (yellow card) 67'; Baker-Whiting (yellow card) 88'; Acosta (yellow card) 90+7'	Report	Martínez 22'; Porteous (yellow card) 58'; Bouanga 68'; Segura (yellow card) 76'	Stadium: Geodis Park; Attendance: 27,948; Referee: Rubiel Vazquez

May 23 14	Nashville SC	2–1	New York City FC	Nashville, Tennessee
5:30 p.m. CDT	Palacios 23'; Woledzi 49'; Qasem (yellow card) 66'; Espinoza (yellow card) 86'	Report	Fernández 23' (pen.); Trewin (yellow card) 26'	Stadium: Geodis Park; Attendance: 25,835; Referee: Alexis Da Silva

July 17 15	Nashville SC	1–0	Atlanta United FC	Nashville, Tennessee
5:15 p.m. CDT	Mohammed 79', (yellow card) 85'	Report	Mihaj (yellow card) 90+10'	Stadium: Geodis Park; Attendance: 30,109; Referee: Filip Dujic

July 22 16	Nashville SC	1–0	CF Montréal	Nashville, Tennessee
5:30 p.m. CDT	Surridge 68' (pen.), (yellow card) 86'	Report	Owusu (yellow card) 90+7'	Stadium: Geodis Park; Attendance: 25,490; Referee: Marcos de Oliveira

July 25 17	Orlando City SC	1–0	Nashville SC	Orlando, Florida
6:30 p.m. CDT	Tiago (yellow card) 20'; Spicer 72'	Report		Stadium: Inter.co Stadium; Attendance: 24,453; Referee: Ramy Touchan

August 1 18	D.C. United	2–2	Nashville SC	Washington, D.C.
4:30 p.m. CDT	Baribo (yellow card) 45+3', (goal) 77'; Hefti 56'; Bartlett (yellow card) 72'	Report	Surridge 32' (pen.); Mohammed 40', (yellow card) 45+3'; Saad (yellow card) 84'	Stadium: Audi Field; Attendance: 19,215; Referee: Ricardo Montero

August 15 19	Nashville SC	4–1	Inter Miami CF	Nashville, Tennessee
5:30 p.m. CDT	Nájar 17'; Surridge (yellow card) 45+6', (goal) 56'; Mukhtar 49', 63'	Report	Segovia 45+3'; Casemiro (yellow card) 48'; Messi (yellow card) 59'; Ruiz (yellow card) 79'	Stadium: Geodis Park; Attendance: 30,109; Referee: Drew Fischer

August 19 20	New York Red Bulls	0–1	Nashville SC	Harrison, New Jersey
6:30 p.m. CDT	Bazán (yellow card) 90+1'	Report	Lovitz (yellow card) 12'; Corcoran (yellow card) 58'; Woledzi 90+2'	Stadium: Sports Illustrated Stadium; Attendance: 15,148; Referee: Lorenzo Hernandez

August 22 21	Nashville SC	3–2	Columbus Crew	Nashville, Tennessee
5:30 p.m. CDT	Mukhtar 27'; Lovitz (yellow card) 39'; Baker-Whiting 90+3'; Najar 90+5'	Report	Ruvalcaba (yellow card) 49'; Farsi 58'; Gomes 68'	Stadium: Geodis Park; Attendance: 25,173; Referee: Victor Rivas

August 29 22	Nashville SC	4–0	FC Cincinnati	Nashville, Tennessee
5:30 p.m. CDT	Surridge 43'; Najar (yellow card) 49'; Mukhtar 53'; Palacios (yellow card) 70'; Tagseth (yellow card) 79'; Acosta 89'; Qasem 90+6'	Report	Nwobodo (yellow card) 44'; Ramírez (yellow card) 89'	Stadium: Geodis Park; Attendance: 26,730; Referee: Armando Villarreal

September 4 23	New York City FC	0–0	Nashville SC	New York, New York
4:30 p.m. CDT	O'Toole (yellow card) 68'; Jones (yellow card) 90'	Report	Najar (yellow card) 13'; Yazbek (yellow card) 49'; Mukhtar (yellow card) 53'; Acosta (yellow card) 90+2'	Stadium: Yankee Stadium; Attendance: 20,393; Referee: Rosendo Mendoza

September 9 24	Toronto FC	2–1	Nashville SC	Toronto, Ontario
4:30 p.m. CDT	Sallói 72'; Aristizábal 90+3'; Gavran (yellow card) 90+7'	Report	Dorsch 3' (o.g.)	Stadium: BMO Field; Attendance: 13,769; Referee: Filip Dujic

September 12 25	Inter Miami CF	2–2	Nashville SC	Miami, Florida
4:30 p.m. CDT	Baker-Whiting 19' (o.g.); Caicedo (yellow card) 41'; Messi 62'; Berterame (yellow card) 86'; Galarza (yellow card) 90'	Report	Surridge 4', 90+1'; Muyl (yellow card) 9'; Woledzi (yellow card) 43'	Stadium: Nu Stadium; Attendance: 26,603; Referee: Guido Gonzales Jr.

September 19 26	Nashville SC	3–0	Chicago Fire FC	Nashville, Tennessee
6:30 p.m. CDT	Surridge 33'; Mukhtar (yellow card) 36', (goal) 87'; Espinoza 78'	Report	Elliott (yellow card) 57'	Stadium: Geodis Park; Attendance: 25,521; Referee: Lorenzo Hernandez

September 26 27	Nashville SC	2–0	Toronto FC	Nashville, Tennessee
5:30 p.m. CDT	Mukhtar 16', 43'; Surridge (yellow card) 81'	Report		Stadium: Geodis Park; Attendance: 26,720; Referee: Ramy Touchan

October 10 28	Austin FC	1–4	Nashville SC	Austin, Texas
5:30 p.m. CDT	Biro (yellow card) 37'; Vázquez 76'	Report	Baker-Whiting 30'; Saad 67'; Mohammed (yellow card) 78', (goal) 88'; Schwake (yellow card) 83'; Mukhtar 90+1'	Stadium: Q2 Stadium; Attendance: 20,738; Referee: Ismail Elfath

October 14 29	Nashville SC	4–0	Sporting Kansas City	Nashville, Tennessee
5:30 p.m. CDT	Mukhtar 10'; Surridge 17'; Najar 29'; Madrigal 90+5' (pen.)	Report		Stadium: Geodis Park; Attendance: 23,807; Referee: Joshua Encarnación

October 17 30	San Jose Earthquakes	1–1	Nashville SC	San Jose, California
7:30 p.m. CDT	Leroux (yellow card) 39'; Judd (yellow card) 45+3', (goal) 70'; Harkes (yellow card) 90'	Report	Mohammed (yellow card) 28'; Mukhtar 34'	Stadium: PayPal Park; Attendance: 16,425; Referee: Joe Dickerson

October 24 31	CF Montréal	0–2	Nashville SC	Montreal, Quebec
10:30 a.m. CDT	Pereira (yellow card) 13'; Radojević (yellow card) 48'	Report	Surridge 51'; Saad (yellow card) 65'; Palacios (yellow card) 70'; Mukhtar 76'	Stadium: Saputo Stadium; Attendance: 13,016; Referee: Lukasz Szpala

October 28 32	Nashville SC	0–0	Philadelphia Union	Nashville, Tennessee
5:30 p.m. CDT	Tagseth (yellow card) 22'	Report	Lukić (yellow card) 40'; Jacques (yellow card) 90+2'	Stadium: Geodis Park; Attendance: 24,115; Referee: Pierre-Luc Lauzière

November 1 33	Nashville SC	3–2	New York Red Bulls	Nashville, Tennessee
3:30 p.m. CST	Parker 45' (o.g.); Bazán 78' (o.g.); Surridge 90+1'	Report	Cowell (penalty missed) 19'; Koné (yellow card) 25'; Hall 34'; Mosquera 40'; Ruvalcaba (yellow card) 45+2'	Stadium: Geodis Park; Attendance: 30,109; Referee: Sergii Demianchuk

November 7 34	FC Cincinnati	0–2	Nashville SC	Cincinnati, Ohio
1:00 p.m. CST	Nwobodo (yellow card) 31'; Evander (yellow card) 41'; Gidi (yellow card) 45+3'; Smith (yellow card) 65'; Bucha (yellow card) 88'	Report	Surridge 61', 86'; Muyl (yellow card) 90'; Woledzi (yellow card) 90+6'	Stadium: TQL Stadium; Attendance: 25,513; Referee: Tori Penso

=== MLS Cup playoffs ===
==== Round one ====
November 22 Game 1	Nashville SC	0–1	FC Cincinnati	Nashville, Tennessee
3:00 p.m. CST	Yazbek (yellow card) 45+2'	Report	Yazbek 7' (o.g.); Robinson (yellow card) 39'; Martínez (yellow card) 45'; Malacia (yellow card) 78'; Douděra (yellow card) 85'; Jabbari (yellow card) 90'	Stadium: Geodis Park; Referee: Fotis Bazakos

November 28 Game 2	FC Cincinnati	v	Nashville SC	Cincinnati, Ohio
5:30 p.m. CST				Stadium: TQL Stadium

December 2 Game 3	Nashville SC	v	FC Cincinnati	Nashville, Tennessee
TBA				Stadium: Geodis Park

=== CONCACAF Champions Cup ===
==== Round one ====
February 17 First leg	Atlético Ottawa (Canada)	0–2	(United States) Nashville SC	Hamilton, Ontario (Note: Atlético Ottawa played their home first round match at Hamilton Stadium instead of their regular stadium, TD Place Stadium, Ottawa, which was being renovated.)
8:00 p.m. CST		Report	Pacius 66'; Surridge 90+5'	Stadium: Hamilton Stadium; Attendance: 290; Referee: Steven Madrigal (Costa Rica)

February 24 Second leg	Nashville SC (United States)	5–0 (7–0 agg.)	(Canada) Atlético Ottawa	Nashville, Tennessee
8:00 p.m. CST	Muyl 21'; Knight 36'; Pacius 55'; Maher 63'; Qasem 83'	Report		Stadium: Geodis Park; Attendance: 11,849; Referee: Selvin Brown (Honduras)

==== Round of 16 ====
March 11 First leg	Nashville SC (United States)	0–0	(United States) Inter Miami CF	Nashville, Tennessee
6:30 p.m. CDT		Report	Berterame (yellow card) 51'	Stadium: Geodis Park; Attendance: 25,616; Referee: Juan Gabriel Calderón (Costa Rica)

March 18 Second leg	Inter Miami CF (United States)	1–1 (1–1 (a) agg.)	(United States) Nashville SC	Fort Lauderdale, Florida
6:00 p.m. CDT	Messi 7'; Luján (yellow card) 38'	Report	Espinoza 74'	Stadium: Chase Stadium; Attendance: 17,263; Referee: Adonai Escobedo (Mexico)

==== Quarterfinals ====
April 7 First leg	Nashville SC (United States)	0–0	(Mexico) América	Nashville, Tennessee
7:00 p.m. CDT	Mukhtar (yellow card) 53'	Report	Dourado (yellow card) 77'; Vázquez (yellow card) 85'	Stadium: Geodis Park; Attendance: 27,167; Referee: Oshane Nation (Jamaica)

April 14 Second leg	América (Mexico)	0–1 (0–1 agg.)	(United States) Nashville SC	Mexico City, Mexico
10:30 p.m. CDT		Report	Mukhtar 51'; Yazbek (yellow card) 63'; Schwake (yellow card) 90+2'	Stadium: Estadio Azteca; Attendance: 28,994; Referee: Walter López (Guatemala)

==== Semifinals ====
April 28 First leg	Nashville SC (United States)	0–1	(Mexico) Tigres UANL	Nashville, Tennessee
7:30 p.m. CDT	Palacios (yellow card) 86'	Report	Correa 33'; Brunetta (yellow card) 67'; Vigón (yellow card) 73'; Araújo (yellow card) 85'	Stadium: Geodis Park; Attendance: 14,597; Referee: Keylor Herrera (Costa Rica)

May 5 Second leg	Tigres UANL (Mexico)	1–0 (2–0 agg.)	(United States) Nashville SC	San Nicolás de los Garza, Mexico
8:30 p.m. CDT	Angulo (yellow card) 36'; Brunetta 68'	Report	Madrigal (yellow card) 33'; Palacios (yellow card) 76'	Stadium: Estadio Universitario; Attendance: 41,615; Referee: Mario Escobar (Guatemala)

=== Leagues Cup ===
==== League phase ====
Pos	Team	Pld	W	PW	PL	L	GF	GA	GD	Pts
11	Orlando City SC	3	1	1	0	1	5	5	0	5
12	Minnesota United FC	3	1	0	1	1	4	3	+1	4
13	Nashville SC	3	1	0	0	2	5	4	+1	3
14	Inter Miami CF	3	1	0	0	2	7	7	0	3
15	New York City FC	3	1	0	0	2	4	4	0	3

Source: Leagues Cup

August 5 1	Nashville SC (United States)	0–1	(Mexico) León	Nashville, Tennessee
7:30 p.m. CDT	Williams (yellow card) 11'; Acosta (yellow card) 45'; Najar (yellow card) 76'	Report	Cortizo (yellow card) 17'; Vegas (yellow card) 27'; Arcila 79'	Stadium: Geodis Park; Attendance: 18,436; Referee: Sergio Reyna

August 9 2	Nashville SC (United States)	4–1	(Mexico) Atlético San Luis	Nashville, Tennessee
7:00 p.m. CDT	Espinoza 36', 45+7'; Surridge 38'; Muyl (yellow card) 61'; Lovitz (yellow card) 80'; Baker-Whiting 88'	Report	Torres (yellow card) 13'; Llorente 18'; Águila (yellow card) 45+6'	Stadium: Geodis Park; Attendance: 11,887; Referee: Carly Shaw-MacLaren

August 12 3	Monterrey (Mexico)	2–1	(United States) Nashville SC	Nashville, Tennessee
7:00 p.m. CDT	Rodríguez (yellow card) 23'; Pineda 52'; Cuypers 90+2'	Report	Qasem 1'; Muyl (yellow card) 43'; Maher (yellow card) 81'	Stadium: Geodis Park; Referee: Said Martínez

== Roster ==
As of February 21, 2026

Note: Flags indicate national team as defined under FIFA eligibility rules; some limited exceptions apply. Players may hold more than one non-FIFA nationality.

No.	Pos.	Nation	Player
1	GK	USA	Joe Willis
2	DF	USA	Dan Lovitz
3	DF	GHA	Maxwell Woledzi
4	DF	COL	Jeisson Palacios
5	DF	USA	Jack Maher
6	MF	HON	Bryan Acosta
7	FW	ARG	Cristian Espinoza (DP)
8	MF	AUS	Patrick Yazbek
9	FW	ENG	Sam Surridge (DP)
10	MF	GER	Hany Mukhtar (DP)
12	MF	CAN	Charles-Emile Brunet
13	GK	DOM	Xavier Valdez
14	MF	GHA	Shak Mohammed
16	MF	USA	Matthew Corcoran

No.	Pos.	Nation	Player
17	FW	HAI	Woobens Pacius
18	DF	USA	Isaiah LeFlore
19	MF	USA	Alex Muyl
20	MF	NOR	Edvard Tagseth
21	DF	USA	Thomas Williams
22	DF	USA	Josh Bauer
23	DF	CAN	Jordan Knight
27	MF	USA	Reed Baker-Whiting
31	DF	HON	Andy Najar
33	DF	USA	Chris Applewhite (HG)
37	MF	IRQ	Ahmed Qasem
41	FW	CRC	Warren Madrigal
99	GK	USA	Brian Schwake
—	DF	JAM	Malachi Molina (on loan from FC Dallas)
