= 2024 Nashville SC season =

Nashville SC
2024 season
- General manager: Mike Jacobs
- Head coach: Gary Smith
- Stadium: Geodis Park
- MLS: Conference: 13th Overall: 25th
- MLS Cup Playoffs: Did not qualify
- Leagues Cup: Group stage
- CONCACAF Champions Cup: Round of 16
- Top goalscorer: League: Sam Surridge (12); All: Sam Surridge (15)
- Average home league attendance: 28,587

The 2024 Nashville SC season was the fifth season for Nashville SC as a member of Major League Soccer (MLS), the top flight of professional soccer in the United States.

As runners-up in the 2023 Leagues Cup, they earned a berth to compete in the 2024 CONCACAF Champions Cup opening the season against Dominican club Moca FC. They opened the MLS season shortly afterwards facing the New York Red Bulls.

== Roster ==
As of February 29, 2024

Note: Flags indicate national team as defined under FIFA eligibility rules; some limited exceptions apply. Players may hold more than one non-FIFA nationality.

No.	Pos.	Nation	Player
1	GK	USA	Joe Willis
2	DF	USA	Daniel Lovitz
3	DF	CAN	Lukas MacNaughton
5	DF	USA	Jack Maher
6	MF	GER	Amar Sejdić
8	MF	CRC	Randall Leal
9	FW	ENG	Sam Surridge
10	MF	GER	Hany Mukhtar
11	FW	USA	Tyler Boyd
12	FW	USA	Teal Bunbury
13	DF	USA	Joey Skinner
14	FW	CAN	Jacob Shaffelburg
16	MF	ENG	Dru Yearwood
17	FW	USA	McKinze Gaines
18	DF	USA	Shaq Moore

No.	Pos.	Nation	Player
19	MF	USA	Alex Muyl
20	MF	PAN	Aníbal Godoy
21	FW	GHA	Forster Ajago
22	DF	USA	Josh Bauer
23	DF	USA	Taylor Washington
25	DF	USA	Walker Zimmerman
27	MF	CMR	Brian Anunga
28	FW	CAN	Woobens Pacius
29	DF	USA	Julian Gaines
30	GK	USA	Elliot Panicco
44	DF	USA	Brent Kallman
47	MF	SLE	Isaiah Jones
54	MF	USA	Sean Davis
67	GK	USA	Ben Martino
77	FW	USA	Adem Sipić

== Competitions ==
=== Major League Soccer ===
==== Standings ====
===== Eastern Conference =====
MLS Eastern Conference table (2024)
Pos	Team	Pld	W	L	T	GF	GA	GD	Pts
11	Toronto FC	34	11	19	4	40	61	−21	37
12	Philadelphia Union	34	9	15	10	62	55	+7	37
13	Nashville SC	34	9	16	9	38	54	−16	36
14	New England Revolution	34	9	21	4	37	74	−37	31
15	Chicago Fire FC	34	7	18	9	40	62	−22	30

Source: MLS
Rules for classification: 1) points; 2) total wins; 3) total goal differential; 4) total goals scored; 5) fewer disciplinary points; 6) away goal differential; 7) away goals scored; 8) home goals differential; 9) home goals scored; 10) coin toss (2 clubs tied) or drawing of lots (≥3 clubs tied)

===== Overall =====
Overall MLS standings table
Pos	Team	Pld	W	L	T	GF	GA	GD	Pts	Qualification
23	Philadelphia Union	34	9	15	10	62	55	+7	37	Qualification for the U.S. Open Cup Round of 32 (Note: As one of the U.S. teams who did not qualify for the 2025 CONCACAF Champions Cup or the 2025 Leagues Cup)
24	St. Louis City SC	34	8	13	13	50	63	−13	37	Qualification for the U.S. Open Cup Round of 32
25	Nashville SC	34	9	16	9	38	54	−16	36	Qualification for the U.S. Open Cup Round of 32
26	New England Revolution	34	9	21	4	37	74	−37	31	Qualification for the U.S. Open Cup Round of 32
27	Sporting Kansas City	34	8	19	7	51	66	−15	31	Qualification for the CONCACAF Champions Cup Round One (Note: Sporting Kansas City qualified as 2024 U.S. Open Cup finalists as the winners, Los Angeles FC, had already qualified via the 2024 Leagues Cup)

Source: MLS
Rules for classification: 1) points; 2) total wins; 3) total goal differential; 4) total goals scored; 5) fewer disciplinary points; 6) away goal differential; 7) away goals scored; 8) home goals differential; 9) home goals scored; 10) coin toss (2 clubs tied) or drawing of lots (≥3 clubs tied)

==== Match results ====
February 25 1	Nashville SC	0–0	New York Red Bulls	Nashville, Tennessee
4:00 p.m. CST	Davis (yellow card) 26'; Anunga (yellow card) 73'; Godoy (yellow card) 90+4'	Report		Stadium: Geodis Park; Attendance: 30,109; Referee: Cristian Campo Hernandez

March 2 2	Colorado Rapids	1−1	Nashville SC	Commerce City, Colorado
8:30 p.m. CST	Moore 47' (o.g.); Yapi (yellow card) 74'	Report	Bunbury 90' (pen.)	Stadium: Dick's Sporting Goods Park; Attendance: 16,223; Referee: Esteban Rosano

March 10 3	Nashville SC	2–2	LA Galaxy	Nashville, Tennessee
2:00 p.m. CDT	Yearwood (yellow card) 39', (goal) 58'; Bunbury 54' (pen.); Shaffelburg (yellow card) 90+6'	Report	Cáceres (yellow card) 42'; Puig 67', (yellow card) 89'; Joveljić 82'	Stadium: Geodis Park; Attendance: 28,316; Referee: Wesley Costa

March 16 4	Nashville SC	2–1	Charlotte FC	Nashville, Tennessee
7:30 p.m. CDT	Surridge 32'; Muyl 40'; Maher (yellow card) 55'	Report	Dejaegere 45+4'; Tavares (yellow card) 56'; Byrne (yellow card) 57'; Privett (yellow card) 81'	Stadium: Geodis Park; Attendance: 28,008; Referee: Esteban Rosano

March 23 5	Los Angeles FC	5–0	Nashville SC	Los Angeles, California
9:30 p.m. CDT	Tillman 9'; Bouanga 18' (pen.), 48'; Hollingshead (yellow card) 39'; Palencia (yellow card) 42'; Atuesta (yellow card) 52', (goal) 90+6'; Olivera 75'; Ordaz (yellow card) 90'	Report	Moore (yellow card) 7'; Yearwood (yellow card) 43'; Willis (red card) 62'	Stadium: BMO Stadium; Attendance: 22,000; Referee: Erick Lezama

March 30 6	Nashville SC	2–2	Columbus Crew	Nashville, Tennessee
7:30 p.m. CDT	Mukhtar 45+3', (yellow card) 90+2'; Godoy 45+9'; Maher (yellow card) 48'; Bauer (yellow card) 90'	Report	Zawadzki 17'; Amundsen (yellow card) 66'; Hinestroza 79'	Stadium: Geodis Park; Attendance: 28,613; Referee: Jon Freemon

April 6 7	Nashville SC	1–2	Philadelphia Union	Nashville, Tennessee
7:30 p.m. CDT	Surridge 42'; Godoy (yellow card) 84'	Report	Carranza 62'; Gazdag 90'	Stadium: Geodis Park; Attendance: 27,739; Referee: Victor Rivas

April 20 8	Inter Miami CF	3–1	Nashville SC	Fort Lauderdale, Florida
6:30 p.m. CDT	Messi 11', 81'; Ruiz (yellow card) 27'; Busquets 39'; Weigandt (yellow card) 40'	Report	Negri 2' (o.g.); MacNaughton (yellow card) 50'	Stadium: Chase Stadium; Attendance: 21,398; Referee: Ismail Elfath

April 27 9	Nashville SC	1–1	San Jose Earthquakes	Nashville, Tennessee
7:30 p.m. CDT	Lovitz (yellow card) 4'; Mukhtar 19'	Report	Tsakiris (yellow card) 14'; Kikanović (yellow card) 40'; Akapo (yellow card) 51'; Skahan 63'; Vítor Costa (yellow card) 90'	Stadium: Geodis Park; Attendance: 28,984; Referee: Allen Chapman

May 4 10	Nashville SC	4–1	CF Montréal	Nashville, Tennessee
7:30 p.m. CDT	Surridge 12', 47', 82'; Zimmerman 21'; Godoy (yellow card) 58'; Muyl (yellow card) 61'	Report	Piette (yellow card) 29'; Zimmerman 65' (o.g.); Wanyama (yellow card) 90'; Zouhir (yellow card) 90+8'	Stadium: Geodis Park; Attendance: 28,600; Referee: Rosendo Mendoza

May 11 11	Charlotte FC	1–0	Nashville SC	Charlotte, North Carolina
6:30 p.m. CDT	Agyemang 52'; Vargas (yellow card) 76'; Smalls (yellow card) 90+6'	Report	Boyd (yellow card) 22'; Lovitz (yellow card) 56'; Davis (yellow card) 88'	Stadium: Bank of America Stadium; Attendance: 36,319; Referee: Tori Penso

May 15 12	Nashville SC	2–0	Toronto FC	Nashville, Tennessee
7:30 p.m. CDT	Yearwood (yellow card) 36'; Moore 81'; Boyd (yellow card) 86'; Bunbury 90+1'	Report	Thompson (yellow card) 60'	Stadium: Geodis Park; Attendance: 27,868; Referee: Marcos DeOliveira II

May 18 13	Nashville SC	1–1	Atlanta United FC	Nashville, Tennessee
12:30 p.m. CDT	Mukhtar 40' (pen.); Surridge (yellow card) 45+3'; Bauer (yellow card) 90'	Report	Guzan (yellow card) 37'; Gregersen (yellow card) 44'; Slisz 55'	Stadium: Geodis Park; Attendance: 28,377; Referee: Drew Fischer

May 25 14	CF Montréal	0–0	Nashville SC	Montreal, Quebec
6:30 p.m. CDT	Lassiter (yellow card) 28'; Sosa (yellow card) 83'; Yankov (yellow card) 90+2'	Report	Godoy (yellow card) 26'	Stadium: Saputo Stadium; Attendance: 19,619; Referee: Timothy Ford

May 29 15	FC Cincinnati	0–2	Nashville SC	Cincinnati, Ohio
6:30 p.m. CDT		Report	Maher 25'; Shaffelburg 29'	Stadium: TQL Stadium; Attendance: 25,513; Referee: Jair Marrufo

June 1 16	Nashville SC	1–2	New England Revolution	Nashville, Tennessee
7:30 p.m. CDT	Mukhtar 80'; Yearwood (yellow card) 90+8'	Report	C. Gil 18'; Bajraktarevic 51'; Arreaga (yellow card) 53'; Polster (yellow card) 73'; Ivačič (yellow card) 88'	Stadium: Geodis Park; Attendance: 26,842; Referee: Ismail Elfath

June 15 17	New York Red Bulls	0–0	Nashville SC	Harrison, New Jersey
6:30 p.m. CDT	Eile (yellow card) 40'; Edelman (yellow card) 75'	Report	Bauer (yellow card) 32'	Stadium: Red Bull Arena; Referee: Guido Gonzales, Jr.

June 19 18	Toronto FC	1–2	Nashville SC	Toronto, Ontario
6:30 p.m. CDT	Coello 34'; Flores (yellow card) 71'; Long (yellow card) 72'	Report	Surridge 65', 90'; Mukhtar (yellow card) 71'	Stadium: BMO Field; Attendance: 23,361; Referee: Chris Penso

June 22 19	Nashville SC	1–0	New York City FC	Nashville, Tennessee
7:30 p.m. CDT	Boyd 23'	Report	Rodríguez (yellow card) 26'; Gray (yellow card) 86'	Stadium: Geodis Park; Attendance: 29,663; Referee: Victor Rivas

June 29 20	Nashville SC	1–2	Inter Miami CF	Nashville, Tennessee
7:30 p.m. CDT	Mukhtar 73', (yellow card) 83'	Report	Bright (yellow card) 31'; Fray 40'; Alba 44'	Stadium: Geodis Park; Attendance: 30,109; Referee: Lukasz Szpala

July 3 21	Columbus Crew	2–0	Nashville SC	Columbus, Ohio
6:30 p.m. CDT	Ramirez 30'; Rossi 65'	Report	Anunga (yellow card) 46'; Yearwood (yellow card) 78'	Stadium: Lower.com Field; Attendance: 20,411; Referee: Joe Dickerson

July 7 22	Portland Timbers	4–1	Nashville SC	Portland, Oregon
9:30 p.m. CDT	Mora 18'; Rodríguez 21', 24'; Williamson 29'	Report	Anunga (red card) 35'; Surridge 82'; Kallman (yellow card) 90+3'	Stadium: Providence Park; Referee: Jon Freemon

July 13 23	D.C. United	2–1	Nashville SC	Washington, D.C.
6:30 p.m. CDT	Dájome 51', 55'; Peltola (yellow card) 84'	Report	Boyd 19'; Surridge (yellow card) 73'	Stadium: Audi Field; Referee: Filip Dujic

July 17 24	Nashville SC	0–3	Orlando City SC	Nashville, Tennessee
7:30 p.m. CDT	Muyl (yellow card) 18'; Bauer (yellow card) 29'; Ajago (yellow card) 88'	Report	Araújo 19'; Thórhallsson (yellow card) 22'; Muyl 41' (o.g.); Torres (yellow card) 64'; Enrique 81'	Stadium: Geodis Park; Attendance: 29,070; Referee: Pierre-Luc Lauziere

July 20 25	Philadelphia Union	3–0	Nashville SC	Chester, Pennsylvania
6:30 p.m. CDT	Gazdag 10', 38', 89'; Lowe (yellow card) 2'; Uhre (yellow card) 20'; Elliott (yellow card) 61'	Report	Muyl (yellow card) 60'; Bauer (yellow card) 67'; Godoy (yellow card) 76'	Stadium: Subaru Park; Attendance: 18,962; Referee: Chris Penso

August 24 26	Nashville SC	0–2	Austin FC	Nashville, Tennessee
7:30 p.m. CDT	Mukhtar (yellow card) 51'	Report	Hines-Ike (yellow card) 6'; Gallagher 43'; Ring (yellow card) 65'; Bukari 84'; Valencia (yellow card) 90+5'	Stadium: Geodis Park; Attendance: 28,876; Referee: Rosendo Mendoza

August 31 27	Orlando City SC	3–0	Nashville SC	Orlando, Florida
6:30 p.m. CDT	Angulo 10'; F. Torres 14', 85'; Schlegel (yellow card) 17'; Enrique (yellow card) 20'; Jansson (yellow card) 39'; Santos (yellow card) 47'; Cartagena (yellow card) 64'; Araújo (yellow card) 83'	Report	Anunga (yellow card) 68'	Stadium: Inter&Co Stadium; Attendance: 22,853; Referee: Victor Rivas

September 14 28	Atlanta United FC	0–2	Nashville SC	Atlanta, Georgia
6:30 p.m. CDT	Williams (yellow card) 55'	Report	Muyl 5'; Surridge (yellow card) 45+4'; Mukhtar (yellow card) 56', (goal) 76'	Stadium: Mercedes-Benz Stadium; Attendance: 43,330; Referee: Armando Villarreal

September 18 29	Nashville SC	1–0	Chicago Fire FC	Nashville, Tennessee
7:30 p.m. CDT	Surridge 19'; Godoy (yellow card) 21'; Lovitz (yellow card) 26'; Yazbek (yellow card) 85'; Ajago (yellow card) 85'; Willis (yellow card) 91'	Report	Omsberg (yellow card) 64'	Stadium: Geodis Park; Attendance: 27,967; Referee: Rubiel Vazquez

September 21 30	Nashville SC	2–2	FC Cincinnati	Nashville, Tennessee
7:30 p.m. CDT	Surridge 5', 25', (yellow card) 41'; Godoy (yellow card) 75'; Lovitz (yellow card) 90'	Report	Acosta 9'; Orellano 52'; Murphy (yellow card) 74'; Yedlin (yellow card) 79'; Hadebe (yellow card) 90'	Stadium: Geodis Park; Attendance: 27,976; Referee: Sergii Demianchuk

September 28 31	New England Revolution	1–0	Nashville SC	Foxborough, Massachusetts
6:30 p.m. CDT	Polster (yellow card) 43'; Bye 86'	Report	Moore (yellow card) 41'	Stadium: Gillette Stadium; Attendance: 42,312; Referee: Marcos de Oliveira

October 2 32	Nashville SC	3–4	D.C. United	Nashville, Tennessee
7:30 p.m. CDT	Muyl 6', 62'; Mukhtar 45'; Zimmerman (yellow card) 74'; Bunbury (yellow card) 83'; Lovitz (yellow card) 90+2'	Report	Bartlett 24', (yellow card) 43'; McVey (yellow card) 38'; Herrera (yellow card) 41'; Benteke 76'; Pirani 90+4', 90+7'	Stadium: Geodis Park; Attendance: 28,863; Referee: Lukasz Szpala

October 5 33	New York City FC	3–1	Nashville SC	Harrison, New Jersey
6:30 p.m. CDT	Rodríguez 1', 18'; Martínez 21'	Report	Zimmerman (yellow card) 45+2'; Mukhtar 58'; Yazbek (yellow card) 60'	Stadium: Red Bull Arena; Referee: Serhiy Boyko

October 19 34	Chicago Fire FC	0–3	Nashville SC	Chicago, Illinois
5:00 p.m. CDT	Navarro (yellow card) 57'	Report	Muyl 54'; Gaines (yellow card) 60'; Shaffelburg (yellow card) 63', (goal) 90+1'; Godoy (yellow card) 69'; Sam Surridge 87'	Stadium: Soldier Field; Attendance: 23,942; Referee: Jon Freemon

=== U.S. Open Cup ===
Nashville SC was not sent to the tournament, and neither was their MLS Next Pro team Huntsville City FC following the deal reached on March 1, 2024 due to participation in the 2024 CONCACAF Champions Cup.

=== CONCACAF Champions Cup ===
==== Round one ====
February 22 Round one 1st Leg	Moca (Dominican Republic)	0–3	(United States) Nashville SC	Santiago, Dominican Republic
6:00 p.m. CST		Report	Mukhtar 12'; Surridge 25'; Boyd 75'; Bunbury (yellow card) 82'	Stadium: Estadio Cibao FC; Referee: Bryan López (Guatemala)

February 28 Round one 2nd Leg	Nashville SC (United States)	4–0 (7–0 agg.)	(Dominican Republic) Moca	Nashville, Tennessee
8:15 p.m. CST	Gaines 13'; Ajago 38', 53'; Shaffelburg 45'	Report	Jiménez (yellow card) 82'	Stadium: Geodis Park; Attendance: 6,289; Referee: Oshane Nation (Jamaica)
Note: Nashville SC won 7–0 on aggregate.

==== Round of 16 ====
March 7 Round of 16 1st Leg	Nashville SC (United States)	2–2	(United States) Inter Miami CF	Nashville, Tennessee
8:00 p.m. CST	Shaffelburg 4', 47'	Report	Redondo (yellow card) 26'; Messi 52'; Suárez 90+5'	Stadium: Geodis Park; Attendance: 31,109; Referee: Marco Ortíz (Mexico)

March 13 Round of 16 2nd Leg	Inter Miami CF (United States)	3–1 (5–3 agg.)	(United States) Nashville SC	Fort Lauderdale, Florida
7:15 p.m. CDT	Suárez 8'; Messi 23'; Taylor 63'	Report	Godoy (yellow card) 4'; Surridge 90+3'	Stadium: Chase Stadium; Attendance: 18,143; Referee: Drew Fischer (Canada)
Note: Inter Miami CF won 5–3 on aggregate.

=== Leagues Cup ===
==== Group Stage (East 5) ====
Pos	Team	Pld	W	PW	PL	L	GF	GA	GD	Pts	Qualification	NER	MAZ	NAS
1	(United States Soccer Federation) New England Revolution	2	1	1	0	0	2	1	+1	5	Advance to knockout stage	—	1–0	1–1
2	(Mexican Football Federation) Mazatlán	2	1	0	0	1	2	1	+1	3	Advance to knockout stage	—	—	—
3	(United States Soccer Federation) Nashville SC	2	0	0	1	1	1	3	−2	1		—	0–2	—

Source: Leagues Cup
Rules for classification: Tiebreakers

July 31 Group stage	Nashville SC (United States)	0–2	(Mexico) Mazatlán	Nashville, Tennessee
8:00 p.m. CDT	Bunbury (yellow card) 60'; Mukhtar (yellow card) 60'	Report	Árciga 47', 54'; Rubio (yellow card) 62'; Escoboza (yellow card) 64'; Almada (yellow card) 67'; Amarilla (yellow card) 90'; Del Prete (yellow card) 90+1'	Stadium: Geodis Park; Attendance: 25,772; Referee: Lizzet García

August 6 Group stage	New England Revolution (United States)	1–1 (5–4 p)	(United States) Nashville SC	Foxborough, Massachusetts
7:30 p.m. CDT	Wood 3'; Miller (yellow card) 14'; Harkes (yellow card) 45+3'; Fry (yellow card) 90+3'	Report	Surridge (yellow card) 39', (goal) 45+1'	Stadium: Gillette Stadium; Attendance: 13,538; Referee: Alyssa Nichols
	Penalties
	McNamara (penalty scored); Polster (penalty scored); Harkes (penalty scored); Arreaga (penalty scored); Boateng (penalty missed); Bye (penalty scored)		(penalty scored) Mukhtar; (penalty scored) Sejdić; (penalty scored) Godoy; (penalty scored) Pérez; (penalty missed) Muyl; (penalty missed) Lovitz

== Statistics ==
=== Goalscorers ===
Rank	Player	MLS	CONCACAF	Leagues Cup	Total
1	(England) Sam Surridge	12	2	1	15
2	(Germany) Hany Mukhtar	8	1	0	9
3	(United States) Alex Muyl	5	0	0	5
4	(Canada) Jacob Shaffelburg	2	2	0	4
5	(United States) Tyler Boyd	2	1	0	3
5	(United States) Teal Bunbury	3	0	0	3
7	(Ghana) Forster Ajago	0	2	0	2
8	(United States) McKinze Gaines	0	1	0	1
8	(Panama) Aníbal Godoy	1	0	0	1
8	(United States) Jack Maher	1	0	0	1
8	(United States) Shaq Moore	1	0	0	1
8	(England) Dru Yearwood	1	0	0	1
8	(United States) Walker Zimmerman	1	0	0	1
Own goals		1	1	0	2
Total		38	10	1	49
