= MLS Player of the Month =

Monthly soccer award given to players in Major League Soccer

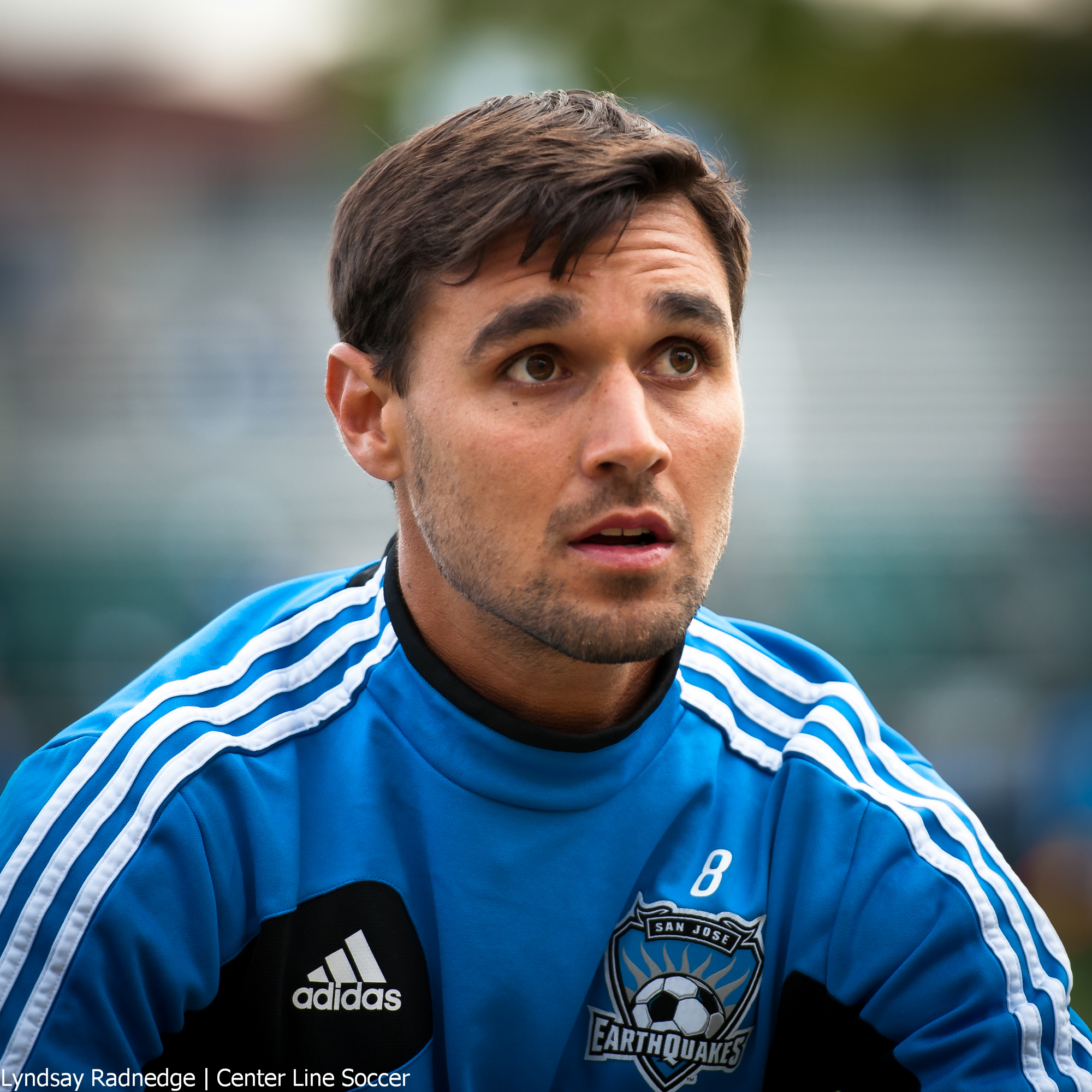
Chris Wondolowski has won a record seven Player of the Month awards, winning four of them in the 2012 season alone.

The Major League Soccer Player of Month is a monthly soccer award given to players in Major League Soccer. The honor is given to the player deemed to have had the best cumulative performance in each month by a panel of journalists from the North American Soccer Reporters organization. The award was formerly voted on by the Professional Soccer Reporters Association.

== Winners ==
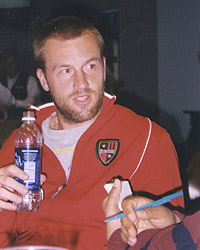
Clint Mathis was the first player to win the award twice in one season.

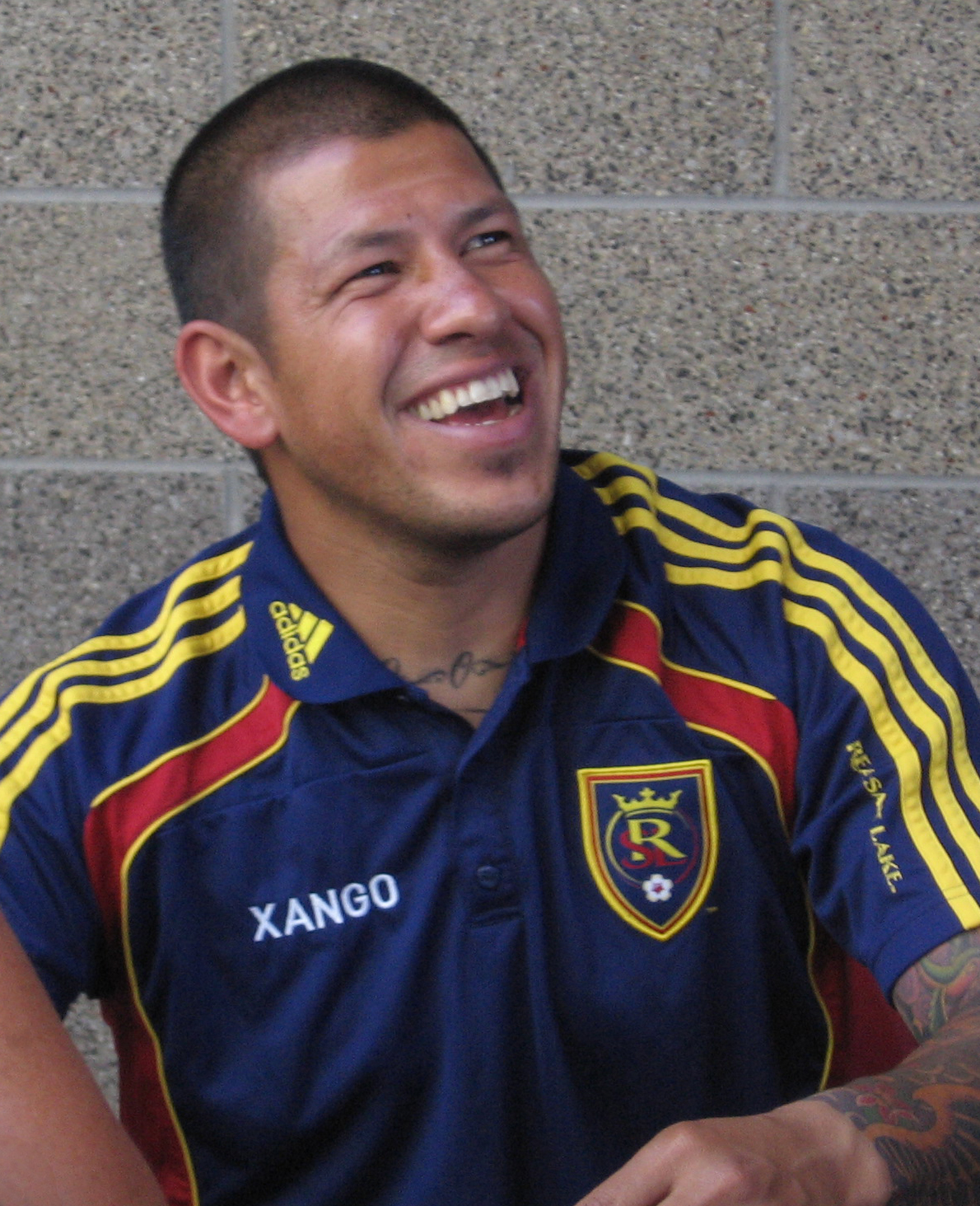
Nick Rimando is the goalkeeper with the most Player of the Month awards, with three.

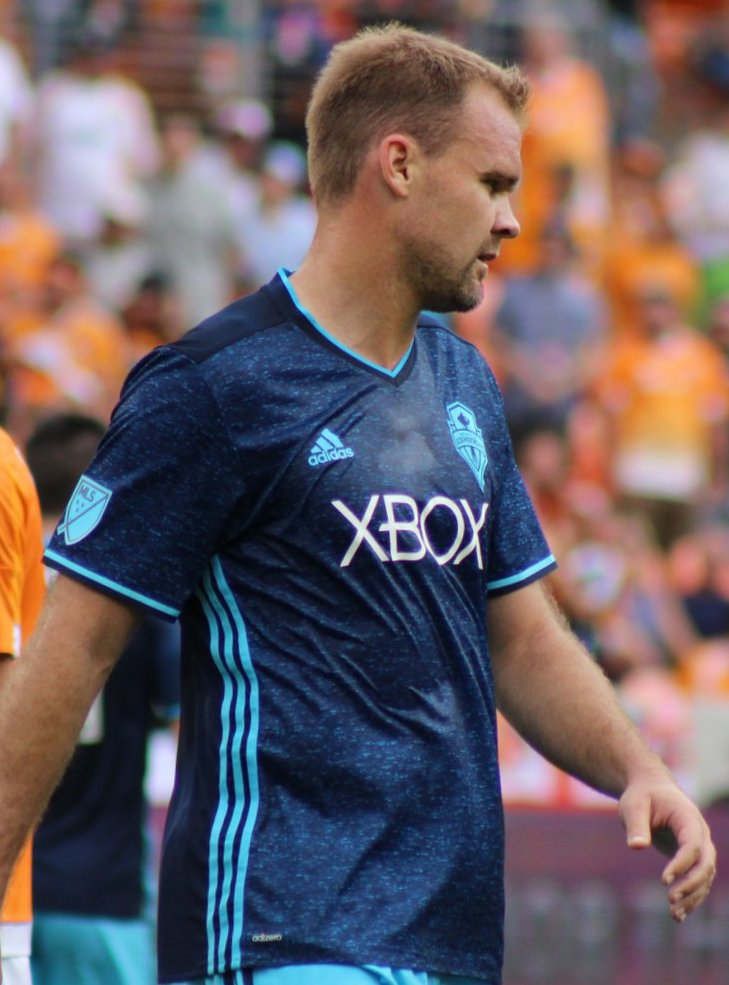
Chad Marshall is the defender with the most Player of the Month awards, with two.

Cavan Sullivan was the youngest Player of the Month winner, aged seventeen years and two days old.

Month	Year (Note: Each year is linked to an article on the particular season associated with the month of that year.)	Player	Nationality	Pos.	Club	Ref.
April	1996	Mauricio Cienfuegos	El Salvador	MF	Los Angeles Galaxy	
May	1996	Carlos Valderrama	Colombia	MF	Tampa Bay Mutiny	
June	1996	Eduardo Hurtado	Ecuador	FW	Los Angeles Galaxy	
July	1996	Jason Kreis	United States	FW	Dallas Burn	
August	1996	Marco Etcheverry	Bolivia	MF	D.C. United	
September	1996	Brad Friedel	United States	GK	Columbus Crew	
April	1997	Jaime Moreno	Bolivia	MF	D.C. United	
May	1997	Alain Sutter	Switzerland	MF	Dallas Burn	
June	1997	John Harkes	United States	MF	D.C. United	
July	1997	Wélton	Brazil	FW	Los Angeles Galaxy	
August	1997	Brad Friedel	United States	GK	Columbus Crew	
September	1997	Walter Zenga	Italy	GK	New England Revolution	
March	1998	Cobi Jones	United States	MF	Los Angeles Galaxy	
April	1998	Juergen Sommer	United States	GK	Columbus Crew	
May	1998	Piotr Nowak	Poland	MF	Chicago Fire	
June	1998	Ross Paule	United States	MF	Colorado Rapids	
July	1998	Roy Lassiter	United States	FW	D.C. United	
August	1998	Stern John	Trinidad and Tobago	FW	Columbus Crew	
September	1998	Diego Serna	Colombia	FW	Miami Fusion	
March	1999	Ante Razov	United States	FW	Chicago Fire	
April	1999	Musa Shannon	United States (Note: Represented Liberia at international level after the award was given.)	FW	Tampa Bay Mutiny	
May	1999	Roy Lassiter	United States	FW	D.C. United	
June	1999	Jason Kreis	United States	FW	Dallas Burn	
July	1999	Raúl Díaz Arce	El Salvador	FW	Tampa Bay Mutiny	
August	1999	Matt Jordan	United States	GK	Dallas Burn	
September	1999	Ronald Cerritos	El Salvador	FW	San Jose Clash	
April	2000	Miklos Molnar	Denmark	FW	Kansas City Wizards	
May	2000	Tony Meola	United States	GK	Kansas City Wizards	
June	2000	Clint Mathis	United States	MF	MetroStars	
July	2000	Dante Washington	United States	FW	Columbus Crew	
August	2000	Clint Mathis	United States	MF	MetroStars	
September	2000	Diego Serna	Colombia	FW	Miami Fusion	
April	2001	Alex Pineda Chacón	Honduras	MF	Miami Fusion	
May	2001	Clint Mathis	United States	MF	MetroStars	
June	2001	Diego Serna	Colombia	FW	Miami Fusion	
July	2001	Hristo Stoichkov	Bulgaria	FW	Chicago Fire	
August	2001	Brian Maisonneuve	United States	MF	Columbus Crew	
April	2002	Carlos Ruiz	Guatemala	FW	Los Angeles Galaxy	
May	2002	Taylor Twellman	United States	FW	New England Revolution	
June	2002	Ariel Graziani	Ecuador	FW	San Jose Earthquakes	
July	2002	Carlos Ruiz	Guatemala	FW	Los Angeles Galaxy	
August	2002	Edson Buddle	United States	FW	Columbus Crew	
April	2003	Landon Donovan	United States	FW	San Jose Earthquakes	
May	2003	Preki	United States	MF	Kansas City Wizards	
June	2003	Ante Razov	United States	FW	Chicago Fire	
July	2003	Mark Chung	United States	MF	Colorado Rapids	
August	2003	Carlos Ruiz	Guatemala	FW	Los Angeles Galaxy	
September	2003	Landon Donovan	United States	FW	San Jose Earthquakes	
October	2003	Pat Noonan	United States	FW	New England Revolution	
April	2004	Carlos Ruiz	Guatemala	FW	Los Angeles Galaxy	
May	2004	Alejandro Moreno	Venezuela	FW	Los Angeles Galaxy	
June	2004	Chris Klein	United States	MF	Kansas City Wizards	
July	2004	Amado Guevara	Honduras	MF	MetroStars	
August	2004	Pat Onstad	Canada	GK	San Jose Earthquakes	
September	2004	Jon Busch	United States	GK	Columbus Crew	
October	2004	Andy Herron	Costa Rica	FW	Chicago Fire	
April	2005	Clint Dempsey	United States	FW	New England Revolution	
May	2005	Carlos Ruiz	Guatemala	FW	FC Dallas	
June	2005	Nate Jaqua	United States	FW	Chicago Fire	
July	2005	Ricardo Clark	United States	MF	San Jose Earthquakes	
August	2005	Scott Sealy	Trinidad and Tobago	FW	Kansas City Wizards	
September	2005	Taylor Twellman	United States	FW	New England Revolution	
October	2005	Dwayne De Rosario	Canada	FW	San Jose Earthquakes	
April	2006	Brian Ching	United States	FW	Houston Dynamo	
May	2006	Carlos Ruiz	Guatemala	FW	FC Dallas	
June	2006	José Burciaga Jr.	United States	DF	Kansas City Wizards	
July	2006	Jonathan Bornstein	United States	DF	Chivas USA	
August	2006	Jeff Cunningham	United States	FW	Real Salt Lake	
September	2006	Matt Pickens	United States	GK	Chicago Fire	
October	2006	Amado Guevara	Honduras	MF	New York Red Bulls	
April	2007	Eddie Johnson	United States	FW	Kansas City Wizards	
May	2007	Juan Pablo Ángel	Colombia	FW	New York Red Bulls	
June	2007	Juan Pablo Ángel	Colombia	FW	New York Red Bulls	
July	2007	Guillermo Barros Schelotto	Argentina	FW	Columbus Crew	
August	2007	Troy Perkins	United States	GK	D.C. United	
September	2007	Luciano Emílio	Brazil	FW	D.C. United	
October	2007	Matt Pickens	United States	GK	Chicago Fire	
April	2008	Landon Donovan	United States	FW	Los Angeles Galaxy	
May	2008	Cuauhtémoc Blanco	Mexico	FW	Chicago Fire	
June	2008	Luciano Emílio	Brazil	FW	D.C. United	
July	2008	Nick Rimando	United States	GK	Real Salt Lake	
August	2008	Guillermo Barros Schelotto	Argentina	FW	Columbus Crew	
September	2008	Darren Huckerby	England	FW	San Jose Earthquakes	
October	2008	Juan Pablo Ángel	Colombia	FW	New York Red Bulls	
March	2009	Fredy Montero	Colombia	FW	Seattle Sounders FC	
April	2009	Brian McBride	United States	FW	Chicago Fire	
May	2009	Conor Casey	United States	FW	Colorado Rapids	
June	2009	Guillermo Barros Schelotto	Argentina	FW	Columbus Crew	
July	2009	Landon Donovan	United States	FW	Los Angeles Galaxy	
August	2009	Chad Marshall	United States	DF	Columbus Crew	
September	2009	Jeff Cunningham	United States	FW	FC Dallas	
October	2009	Freddie Ljungberg	Sweden	FW	Seattle Sounders FC	
April	2010	Edson Buddle	United States	FW	Los Angeles Galaxy	
May	2010	Álvaro Saborío	Costa Rica	FW	Real Salt Lake	
June	2010	Nick Rimando	United States	GK	Real Salt Lake	
July	2010	Fredy Montero	Colombia	FW	Seattle Sounders FC	
August	2010	Kevin Hartman	United States	GK	FC Dallas	
September	2010	Omar Cummings	Jamaica	FW	Colorado Rapids	
October	2010	Chris Wondolowski	United States	FW	San Jose Earthquakes	
March	2011	Nick Rimando	United States	GK	Real Salt Lake	
April	2011	Brad Davis	United States	MF	Houston Dynamo	
May	2011	Landon Donovan	United States	FW	LA Galaxy	
June	2011	Graham Zusi	United States	MF	Sporting Kansas City	
July	2011	Kevin Hartman	United States	GK	FC Dallas	
August	2011	Dwayne De Rosario	Canada	FW	D.C. United	
September	2011	Sébastien Le Toux	France	FW	Philadelphia Union	
October	2011	Chris Wondolowski	United States	FW	San Jose Earthquakes	
March	2012	Thierry Henry	France	FW	New York Red Bulls	
April	2012	Chris Wondolowski	United States	FW	San Jose Earthquakes	
May	2012	Dwayne De Rosario	Canada	FW	D.C. United	
June	2012	Chris Wondolowski	United States	FW	San Jose Earthquakes	
July	2012	Robbie Keane	Republic of Ireland	FW	LA Galaxy	
August	2012	Patrice Bernier	Canada	MF	Montreal Impact	
September	2012	Chris Wondolowski	United States	FW	San Jose Earthquakes	
October	2012	Chris Wondolowski	United States	FW	San Jose Earthquakes	
March	2013	Mike Magee	United States	FW	LA Galaxy	
April	2013	Jack McInerney	United States	FW	Philadelphia Union	
May	2013	Jack McInerney	United States	FW	Philadelphia Union	
June	2013	Mike Magee	United States	FW	LA Galaxy	
July	2013	Camilo Sanvezzo	Brazil	FW	Vancouver Whitecaps FC	
August	2013	Robbie Keane	Republic of Ireland	FW	LA Galaxy	
September	2013	Dominic Oduro	Ghana	FW	Columbus Crew	
October	2013	Camilo Sanvezzo	Brazil	FW	Vancouver Whitecaps FC	
March	2014	Mauro Díaz	Argentina	MF	FC Dallas	
April	2014	Clint Dempsey	United States	FW	Seattle Sounders FC	
May	2014	Dom Dwyer	England (Note: Represented the United States at international level after the award was given.)	FW	Sporting Kansas City	
June	2014	Eric Kronberg	United States	GK	Sporting Kansas City	
July	2014	Benny Feilhaber	United States	MF	Sporting Kansas City	
August	2014	Landon Donovan	United States	FW	LA Galaxy	
September	2014	Obafemi Martins	Nigeria	FW	Seattle Sounders FC	
October	2014	Lee Nguyen	United States	MF	New England Revolution	
March	2015	Octavio Rivero	Uruguay	FW	Vancouver Whitecaps FC	
April	2015	Benny Feilhaber	United States	MF	Sporting Kansas City	
May	2015	Krisztián Németh	Hungary	FW	Sporting Kansas City	
June	2015	David Ousted	Denmark	GK	Vancouver Whitecaps FC	
July	2015	Sebastian Giovinco	Italy	FW	Toronto FC	
August	2015	Sebastian Giovinco	Italy	FW	Toronto FC	
September	2015	Didier Drogba	Ivory Coast	FW	Montreal Impact	
October	2015	Didier Drogba	Ivory Coast	FW	Montreal Impact	
March	2016	Joao Plata	Ecuador	FW	Real Salt Lake	
April	2016	Fanendo Adi	Nigeria	FW	Portland Timbers	
May	2016	Bradley Wright-Phillips	England	FW	New York Red Bulls	
June	2016	Yura Movsisyan	Armenia	FW	Real Salt Lake	
July	2016	Frank Lampard	England	MF	New York City FC	
August	2016	Nicolás Lodeiro	Uruguay	MF	Seattle Sounders FC	
September	2016	Chad Marshall	United States	DF	Seattle Sounders FC	
October	2016	Justin Meram	Iraq	MF	Columbus Crew SC	
March	2017	Josef Martínez	Venezuela	FW	Atlanta United FC	
April	2017	Joe Bendik	United States	GK	Orlando City SC	
May	2017	Nemanja Nikolić	Hungary	FW	Chicago Fire	
June	2017	David Villa	Spain	FW	New York City FC	
July	2017	Daniel Royer	Austria	MF	New York Red Bulls	
August	2017	Ignacio Piatti	Argentina	MF	Montreal Impact	
September	2017	Josef Martínez	Venezuela	FW	Atlanta United FC	
March	2018	Felipe Gutiérrez	Chile	MF	Sporting Kansas City	
April	2018	Miguel Almirón	Paraguay	MF	Atlanta United FC	
May	2018	Zack Steffen	United States	GK	Columbus Crew SC	
June	2018	Adama Diomande	Norway	FW	Los Angeles FC	
July	2018	Josef Martínez	Venezuela	FW	Atlanta United FC	
August	2018	Josef Martínez	Venezuela	FW	Atlanta United FC	
September	2018	Luciano Acosta	Argentina	MF	D.C. United	
October	2018	Wayne Rooney	England	FW	D.C. United	
March	2019	Carlos Vela	Mexico	FW	Los Angeles FC	
April	2019	Carlos Vela	Mexico	FW	Los Angeles FC	
May	2019	Chris Wondolowski	United States	FW	San Jose Earthquakes	
June	2019	Maximiliano Moralez	Argentina	MF	New York City FC	
July	2019	Josef Martínez	Venezuela	FW	Atlanta United FC	
August	2019	Josef Martínez	Venezuela	FW	Atlanta United FC	
September	2019	Carlos Vela	Mexico	FW	Los Angeles FC	
August	2020	Daryl Dike	United States	FW	Orlando City SC	
September	2020	Alejandro Pozuelo	Spain	MF	Toronto FC	
October & November	2020	Taty Castellanos	Argentina	FW	New York City FC	
April & May	2021	Javier Hernández	Mexico	FW	LA Galaxy	
June	2021	Carles Gil	Spain	MF	New England Revolution	
July	2021	Gustavo Bou	Argentina	FW	New England Revolution	
August	2021	Taty Castellanos	Argentina	FW	New York City FC	
September	2021	Javier Eduardo López	Mexico	MF	San Jose Earthquakes	
February & March	2022	Lucas Zelarayán	Armenia	MF	Columbus Crew	
April	2022	Sebastián Driussi	Argentina	FW	Austin FC	
May	2022	Paul Arriola	United States	MF	FC Dallas	
June	2022	Luciano Acosta	Argentina	MF	FC Cincinnati	
July	2022	Sebastián Driussi	Argentina	FW	Austin FC	
August	2022	Hany Mukhtar	Germany	MF	Nashville SC	
September & October	2022	Brenner	Brazil	FW	FC Cincinnati	
February & March	2023	Thiago Almada	Argentina	MF	Atlanta United FC	
April	2023	Cristian Espinoza	Argentina	MF	San Jose Earthquakes	
May	2023	Hany Mukhtar	Germany	MF	Nashville SC	
June	2023	Alan Pulido	Mexico	FW	Sporting Kansas City	
July	2023	Luciano Acosta	Argentina	MF	FC Cincinnati	
August	2023	Luciano Acosta	Argentina	MF	FC Cincinnati	
September	2023	Cucho Hernández	Colombia	FW	Columbus Crew	
October	2023	Denis Bouanga	Gabon	FW	Los Angeles FC	
February & March	2024	Luis Suárez	Uruguay	FW	Inter Miami CF	
April	2024	Lionel Messi	Argentina	FW	Inter Miami CF	
May	2024	Luciano Acosta	Argentina	MF	FC Cincinnati	
June	2024	Mateusz Bogusz	Poland	MF	Los Angeles FC	
July	2024	Cucho Hernández	Colombia	FW	Columbus Crew	
August & September	2024	Evander	Brazil	MF	Portland Timbers	
October	2024	Lionel Messi	Argentina	FW	Inter Miami CF	
February & March	2025	Tai Baribo	Israel	FW	Philadelphia Union	
April	2025	Brian White	United States	FW	Vancouver Whitecaps FC	
May	2025	Lionel Messi	Argentina	FW	Inter Miami CF	
June	2025	Anders Dreyer	Denmark	FW	San Diego FC	
July	2025	Lionel Messi	Argentina	FW	Inter Miami CF	
August	2025	Anders Dreyer	Denmark	FW	San Diego FC	
September	2025	Denis Bouanga	Gabon	FW	Los Angeles FC	
October	2025	Lionel Messi	Argentina	FW	Inter Miami CF	
February & March	2026	Sam Surridge	England	FW	Nashville SC	
April	2026	Timo Werner	Germany	FW	San Jose Earthquakes	
May	2026	Evander	Brazil	MF	FC Cincinnati	
July & August	2026	Evander	Brazil	MF	FC Cincinnati	
September	2026	Cavan Sullivan	United States	MF	Philadelphia Union	
October & November	2026	Antoine Griezmann	France	FW	Orlando City SC	

== Multiple winners ==
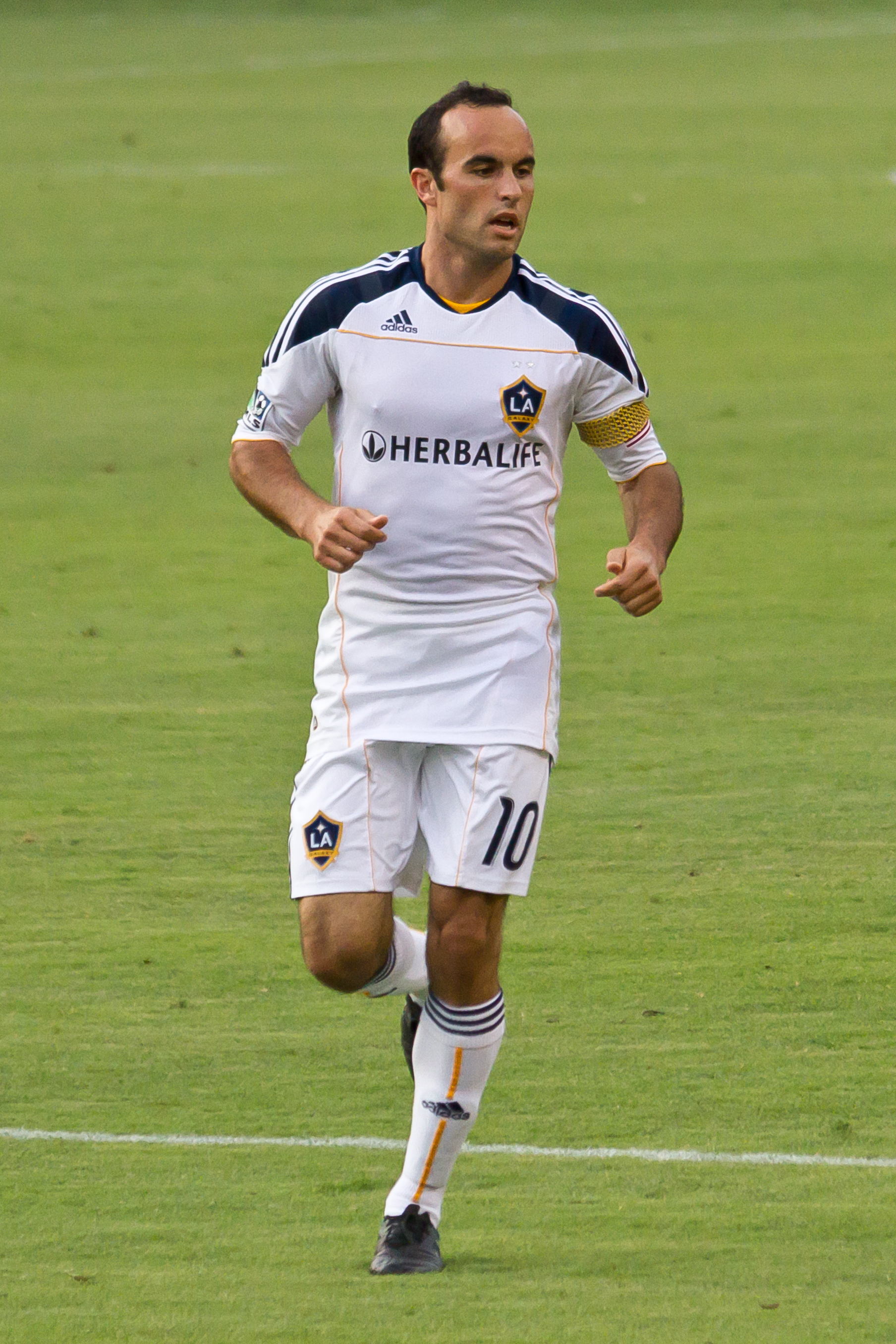
Landon Donovan won six awards over the span of eleven seasons.

The following table lists the number of awards won by players who have won at least two Player of the Month awards.
Players in bold are still active in MLS while players in italic are still active outside MLS.

Rank	Player	Wins
1st	(United States) Chris Wondolowski	7
2nd	(United States) Landon Donovan	6
2nd	(Venezuela) **Josef Martínez**	6
2nd	(Guatemala) Carlos Ruiz	6
5th	(Argentina) Luciano Acosta	5
5th	(Argentina) **Lionel Messi**	5
7th	(Colombia) Juan Pablo Ángel	3
7th	(Argentina) Guillermo Barros Schelotto	3
7th	(Canada) Dwayne De Rosario	3
7th	(Brazil) **Evander**	3
7th	(United States) Clint Mathis	3
7th	(United States) Nick Rimando	3
7th	(Colombia) Diego Serna	3
7th	(Mexico) Carlos Vela	3
15th	(Gabon) **Denis Bouanga**	2
15th	(United States) Edson Buddle	2
15th	(Argentina) Taty Castellanos	2
15th	(United States) Jeff Cunningham	2
15th	(United States) Clint Dempsey	2
15th	(Denmark) **Anders Dreyer**	2
15th	(Argentina) Sebastián Driussi	2
15th	(Ivory Coast) Didier Drogba	2
15th	(Brazil) Luciano Emílio	2
15th	(United States) Benny Feilhaber	2
15th	(United States) Brad Friedel	2
15th	(Italy) Sebastian Giovinco	2
15th	(Honduras) Amado Guevara	2
15th	(United States) Kevin Hartman	2
15th	(Colombia) Cucho Hernández	2
15th	(Republic of Ireland) Robbie Keane	2
15th	(United States) Jason Kreis	2
15th	(United States) Roy Lassiter	2
15th	(United States) Mike Magee	2
15th	(United States) Chad Marshall	2
15th	(United States) Jack McInerney	2
15th	(Colombia) Fredy Montero	2
15th	(Germany) **Hany Mukhtar**	2
15th	(United States) Matt Pickens	2
15th	(United States) Ante Razov	2
15th	(Brazil) Camilo Sanvezzo	2
15th	(United States) Taylor Twellman	2

== Awards won by nationality ==
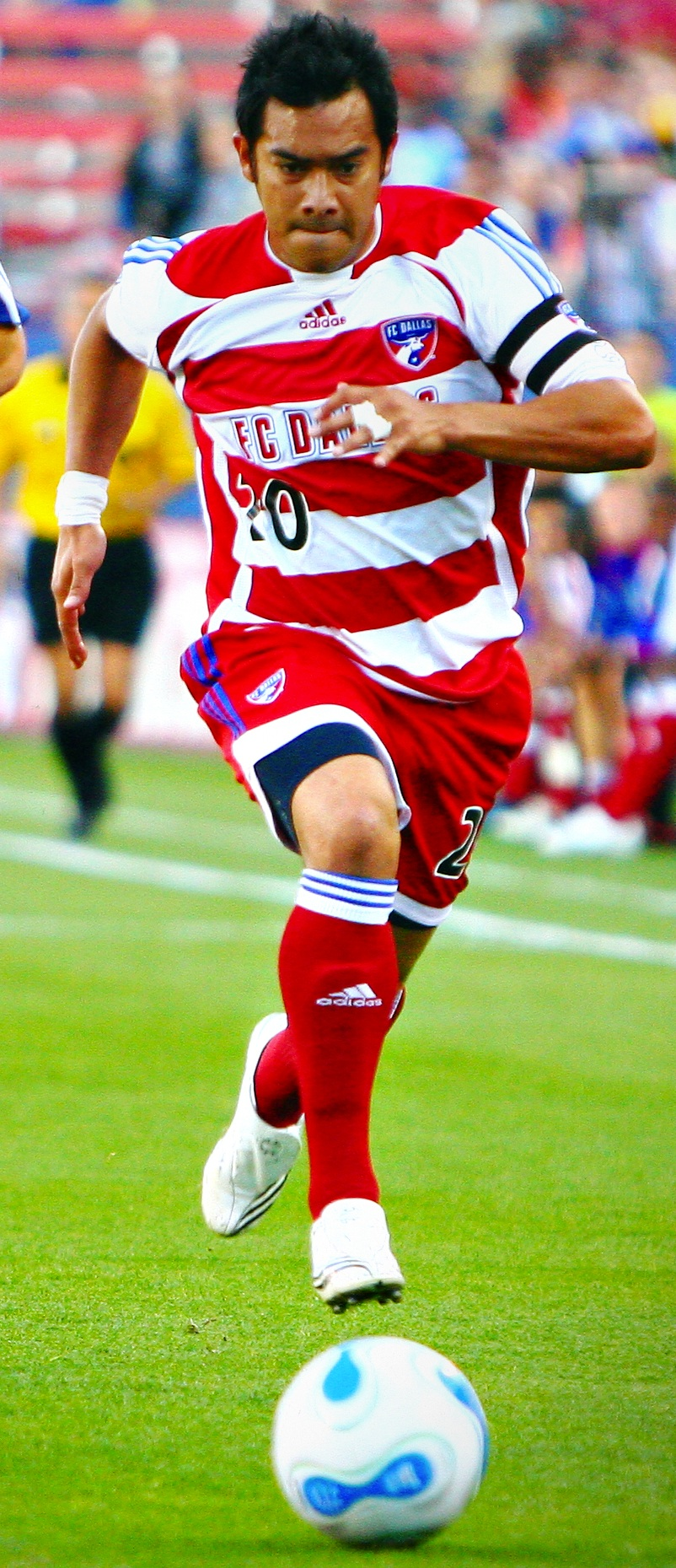
Carlos Ruiz has won all of Guatemala's six awards.

As of November 2026

Nationality	Players	Wins
United States	51	80
Argentina	10	23
Colombia	5	11
Brazil	5	9
Mexico	5	7
Venezuela	2	7
England	6	6
Guatemala	1	6
Canada	3	5
Denmark	3	4
Germany	3	4
Ecuador	3	3
El Salvador	3	3
France	3	3
Spain	3	3
Uruguay	3	3
Honduras	2	3
Italy	2	3
Armenia	2	2
Bolivia	2	2
Costa Rica	2	2
Hungary	2	2
Nigeria	2	2
Poland	2	2
Trinidad and Tobago	2	2
Gabon	1	2
Ivory Coast	1	2
Republic of Ireland	1	2
Austria	1	1
Bulgaria	1	1
Chile	1	1
Ghana	1	1
Iraq	1	1
Israel	1	1
Jamaica	1	1
Norway	1	1
Paraguay	1	1
Sweden	1	1
Switzerland	1	1

== Awards won by club ==
As of November 2026

Club	Players	Wins
LA Galaxy (Note: Formerly named Los Angeles Galaxy.)	11	19
Columbus Crew	13	18
San Jose Earthquakes (Note: Formerly named San Jose Clash.)	11	18
Sporting Kansas City (Note: Formerly named Kansas City Wizards.)	14	15
D.C. United	9	12
Chicago Fire FC	9	11
FC Dallas (Note: Formerly named Dallas Burn.)	8	11
New York Red Bulls (Note: Formerly named MetroStars.)	7	11
New England Revolution	7	8
Atlanta United FC	3	8
Seattle Sounders FC	6	7
Real Salt Lake	5	7
Los Angeles FC	4	7
FC Cincinnati	2	7
Inter Miami CF	2	6
New York City FC	4	5
Philadelphia Union	4	5
Vancouver Whitecaps FC	3	5
Colorado Rapids	4	4
CF Montréal (Note: Formerly named Montreal Impact.)	3	4
Miami Fusion (Note: Dissolved in 2002.)	2	4
Nashville SC	2	3
Orlando City SC	3	3
Tampa Bay Mutiny	3	3
Toronto FC	2	3
Houston Dynamo FC	2	2
Portland Timbers	2	2
Austin FC	1	2
San Diego FC	1	2
Chivas USA (Note: Dissolved in 2014.)	1	1

== Awards won by position ==
As of November 2026

Position	Wins
Forward	135
Midfielder	54
Goalkeeper	20
Defender	4
