= Cristian Espinoza =

Argentine footballer (born 1995)

- Espinoza with Nashville SC in 2026

Personal information
- Full name: Cristian Omar Espinoza
- Date of birth: 3 April 1995 (age 31)
- Place of birth: Buenos Aires, Argentina
- Height: 1.70 m (5 ft 7 in)
- Position: Winger

Team information
- Current team: Nashville SC
- Number: 7

Youth career
- Huracán

Senior career*
Years	Team	Apps	(Gls)
2013–2016	Huracán	90	(9)
2016–2020	Villarreal	0	(0)
2016	→ Alavés (loan)	6	(0)
2017	→ Valladolid (loan)	10	(0)
2017–2018	→ Boca Juniors (loan)	15	(2)
2019	→ San Jose Earthquakes (loan)	30	(2)
2020–2025	San Jose Earthquakes	188	(34)
2026–	Nashville SC	23	(4)

International career^{‡}
2015	Argentina U20	11	(0)
- * Club domestic league appearances and goals as of 6 April 2024 ‡ National team caps and goals as of 16 July 2015

Cristian Omar Espinoza (born 3 April 1995) is an Argentine professional footballer who plays as a winger for Major League Soccer club Nashville SC.

== Club career ==
=== Huracán ===
Born in Buenos Aires, Espinoza graduated from Huracán's youth setup. He made his first team debut on 24 March 2013, coming on as a second half substitute in a 2–2 home draw against Instituto for the Primera B Nacional championship.

Espinoza scored his first professional goal on 26 May, netting his side's last in a 3–1 home win against Crucero del Norte. He subsequently established himself as a regular starter, scoring two goals in 2014 and helping his side promote to Primera División.

Espinoza made his debut in the main category of Argentine football on 3 May 2015, in a 1–1 away draw against Rosario Central. His first goals in the category came on 2 August, netting a brace in a 3–3 draw at Crucero del Norte.

=== Villarreal ===
On 4 August 2016, Espinoza signed a five-year contract with La Liga side Villarreal CF. Fifteen days later, he was loaned to fellow league team Deportivo Alavés until the end of the season.

Espinoza made his debut in the main category of Spanish football on 28 August 2016, replacing Ibai Gómez in a 0–0 home draw against Sporting de Gijón. After being rarely used, he left the club the following 30 January.

On 31 January 2017, Espinoza was loaned to Segunda División side Real Valladolid until June.

=== San Jose Earthquakes ===
On 2 January 2019, Espinoza was loaned to Major League Soccer side San Jose Earthquakes on a season-long loan. On December 11, it was announced that he had joined San Jose on a permanent deal for a then-club-record transfer fee.

Espinoza thrived in San Jose as a creative playmaker, becoming the club's all-time assist leader with 51 on July 12, 2023, before eventually extending the record to 83, in addition to adding two assists in two playoff appearances. He also holds the club record for appearances in consecutive matches at 122. He earned MLS All-Star selections in 2023 and 2025.

=== Nashville SC ===
On 7 January 2026, Espinoza signed a contract with Major League Soccer side Nashville SC as a designated player.

== International career ==
On 11 December 2014 Espinoza was included in Argentina under-20's 32-man list for the 2015 South American Youth Football Championship, held in Uruguay. He was included in the final call-up, and made his debut in the competition on 14 January, starting and assisting Tomás Martínez in the third of a 5–2 routing over Ecuador.

== Career statistics ==
As of match played 24 March 2026

Appearances and goals by club, season and competition
Club	Season	League			National cup (Note: Includes Copa Argentina, Copa del Rey, U.S. Open Cup)		Continental		Other		Total	
Club	Season	Division	Apps	Goals	Apps	Goals	Apps	Goals	Apps	Goals	Apps	Goals
Huracán	2012–13	Primera B Nacional	10	1	0	0	—		—		10	1
Huracán	2013–14	Primera B Nacional	28	2	—		—		—		28	2
Huracán	2014	Primera B Nacional	21	2	4	0	—		—		25	2
Huracán	2015	Argentine Primera División	17	2	1	0	10 (Note: One appearance in Copa Libertadores, nine appearances and four goals in Copa Sudamericana)	4	1 (Note: Appearance in Supercopa Argentina)	0	29	6
Huracán	2016	Argentine Primera División	14	2	—		6 (Note: Appearances in Copa Libertadores)	1	1 (Note: Appearance(s) in Torneos de Verano)	0	21	3
Huracán	Total		90	9	5	0	16	5	2	0	113	14
Alavés (loan)	2016–17	La Liga	6	0	2	0	—		—		8	0
Valladolid (loan)	2016–17	Segunda División	10	0	—		—		—		10	0
Boca Juniors (loan)	2017–18	Argentine Primera División	11	0	1	0	2	0	3	0	17	0
Boca Juniors (loan)	2018–19	Argentine Primera División	4	2	1	0	—		—		5	2
Boca Juniors (loan)	Total		15	2	2	0	2	0	3	0	22	2
San Jose Earthquakes (loan)	2019	MLS	30	2	2	1	—		—		32	3
San Jose Earthquakes	2020	MLS	23	3	—		—		—		26	4
San Jose Earthquakes	2021	MLS	32	3	—		—		—		32	3
San Jose Earthquakes	2022	MLS	34	7	2	0	—		—		36	7
San Jose Earthquakes	2023	MLS	34	13	1	0	—		2 (Note: Appearances in Leagues Cup)	0	38	13
San Jose Earthquakes	2024	MLS	34	4	1	1	—		4	0	39	5
San Jose Earthquakes	2025	MLS	31	4	2	0	—		—		33	4
San Jose Earthquakes	Total		218	36	6	1	—		6	0	236	36
Nashville SC	2026	MLS	23	4	—		3 (Note: Appearances in CONCACAF Champions Cup)	1	0	0	7	2
Career total			344	49	17	2	21	6	11	0	396	57

== Honours ==
Huracán

- Copa Argentina: 2013–14
- Supercopa Argentina: 2014

Boca Juniors

- Primera División: 2017-18

Argentina Youth

- South American U-20 Championship: 2015

Individual

- MLS All-Star: 2023, 2025
- MLS Player of the Month: April 2023
