= Patrick Yazbek =

Australian soccer player (born 2002)

- Yazbek with Nashville SC in 2026

Personal information
- Full name: Patrick Yazbek
- Date of birth: 5 April 2002 (age 24)
- Place of birth: Liverpool, New South Wales, Australia
- Height: 1.85 m (6 ft 1 in)
- Position: Defensive midfielder

Team information
- Current team: Nashville SC
- Number: 8

Youth career
- 2006–2009: Austral
- 2010–2011: Football NSW SAP
- 2012: Club Marconi
- 2013–2015: Sydney United
- 2016: Western Sydney Wanderers
- 2017–2020: Sydney FC

Senior career*
Years	Team	Apps	(Gls)
2020–2021	Sydney FC Youth	23	(1)
2021–2023	Sydney FC	28	(1)
2023–2024	Viking	39	(2)
2024–	Nashville SC	64	(2)
2024	Huntsville City FC	1	(0)

International career^{‡}
2021–2023	Australia U23	10	(0)
2024–	Australia	11	(0)
- * Club domestic league appearances and goals as of 1 November 2026 ‡ National team caps and goals as of 29 September 2026

Patrick Yazbek (born 5 April 2002) is an Australian professional soccer player who plays as a defensive midfielder for Major League Soccer club Nashville SC and the Australia national team.

== Early life ==
Yazbek was born in Liverpool, New South Wales, Australia, and is of Lebanese descent. His father was born in Lebanon, while his mother was born in Australia to Lebanese parents.

Having begun playing soccer aged three, Yazbek joined Austral Soccer Club's under-5s. In 2010, he moved Football NSW's "Skill Acquisition Program". Yazbek then played for other youth teams, namely Club Marconi, Sydney United, Western Sydney Wanderers and Sydney FC.

== Club career ==
=== Sydney FC ===
After making a few bench appearances during the 2020–21 A-League season, Yazbek signed a two-year scholarship contract with Sydney FC in July 2021. He made his senior debut in the 2021 FFA Cup round of 32, in a 4–2 victory over Sydney Olympic. Yazbek's A-League debut came on 12 December 2021, as a substitute in a 2–0 defeat to Central Coast Mariners. On 19 December, he made his starting debut for Sydney FC in a 2–1 win over Wellington Phoenix.

=== Viking FK ===
On 2 February 2023, Norwegian Eliteserien club Viking announced the signing of Yazbek. On 15 April 2023, he scored his first goal for the club in a 2–0 home win against Lillestrøm.

=== Nashville SC ===
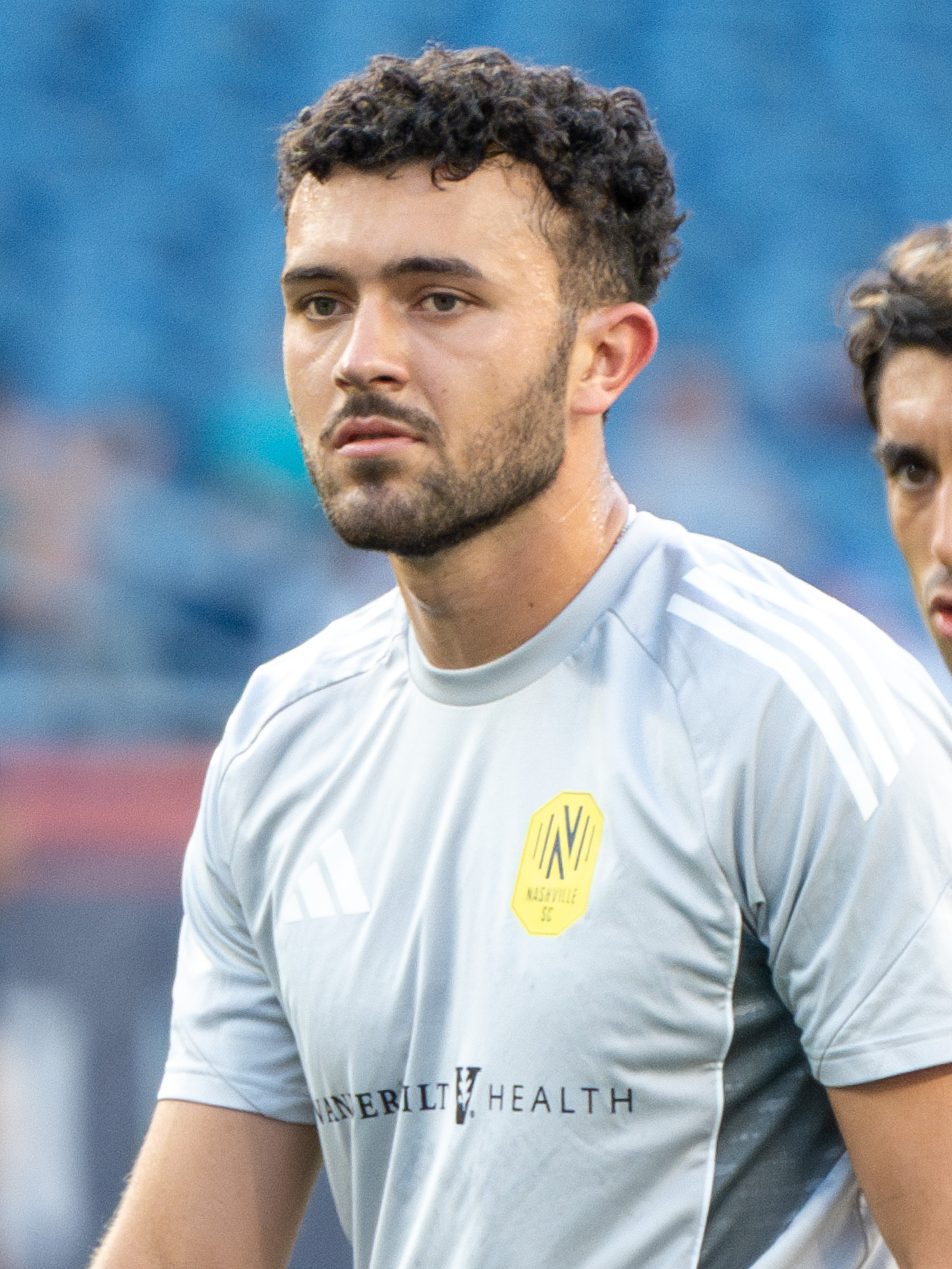
Yazbek with Nashville SC in 2025

On 22 July 2024, Yazbek joined Major League Soccer club Nashville SC. He made his league debut on 24 August against Austin FC but was removed from the match in the first half. Yazbek was suspended for the following two matches for a violation of the league's anti-discrimination policy. According to Outsports, the suspension was a result of Yazbek's use of a homophobic slur during the match after a foul was called against him.

== International career ==
=== Youth ===
Yazbek was selected for the Australia national under-23 team ahead of their qualifiers for the 2022 AFC U-23 Asian Cup. He played in both of Australia's games against Indonesia in October 2021, helping his side qualify for the final tournament. In the 2022 AFC U-23 Asian Cup, Yazbek played six games; Australia finished in fourth place, losing the third place match against Japan.

=== Senior ===
Yazbek was first called up to the Australian senior national team as a train-on player in October 2023, ahead of friendly matches against England and New Zealand. He was subsequently named in Australia's squad for the 2023 AFC Asian Cup, held in January and February 2024, but did not make an appearance during the tournament.

Yazbek was named in the Australia squad for the 2026 FIFA World Cup qualification matches against Lebanon, the country from which his parents were from and who he was also eligible to represent. Ahead of the matches, Lebanon manager Miodrag Radulović criticised Yazbek for his decision to represent Australia, stating "it would be better to be one of the leaders in our team than sitting on the bench [for Australia]". Yazbek did not feature in the first match at Western Sydney Stadium on 21 March, instead making his debut on 26 March at the Canberra Stadium, entering as a second-half substitute and assisting John Iredale in a 5–0 victory.

In October 2024, Yazbek was recalled to the Australian squad as an injury replacement for Massimo Luongo and Connor Metcalfe ahead of World Cup qualifying matches against China and Japan.

== Style of play ==
In 2021, Yazbek described himself as a "hardworking box-to-box midfielder".

== Personal life ==
Yazbek grew up as a Sydney FC supporter. He studied at Holy Spirit Catholic Primary School in Carnes Hill and at Clancy Catholic College in West Hoxton. As of 2021, he was a construction management student at the University of New South Wales.

== Career statistics ==
=== Club ===
As of match played 11 October 2026

Appearances and goals by club, season and competition
Club	Season	League			National cup (Note: Includes Australia Cup, Norwegian Cup, U.S. Open Cup)		Continental		Other		Total	
Club	Season	Division	Apps	Goals	Apps	Goals	Apps	Goals	Apps	Goals	Apps	Goals
Sydney FC Youth	2020	NPL NSW	11	0	—		—		—		11	0
Sydney FC Youth	2021	NPL NSW	12	1	—		—		—		12	1
Sydney FC Youth	Total		23	1	0	0	0	0	0	0	23	1
Sydney FC	2020–21	A-League	0	0	—		—		—		0	0
Sydney FC	2021–22	A-League	14	1	4	0	7 (Note: Appearances in AFC Asian Champions League)	0	—		25	1
Sydney FC	2022–23	A-League	14	0	3	0	0	0	1 (Note: Appearance in Sydney Super Cup)	0	18	0
Sydney FC	Total		28	1	7	0	7	0	1	0	43	1
Viking	2023	Eliteserien	26	2	4	0	—		—		30	2
Viking	2024	Eliteserien	13	0	2	0	—		—		15	0
Viking	Total		39	2	6	0	0	0	0	0	45	2
Nashville SC	2024	MLS	7	0	0	0	—		2 (Note: Appearances in Leagues Cup)	0	9	0
Nashville SC	2025	MLS	32	1	5	0	—		3 (Note: Appearances in MLS Cup playoffs)	0	40	1
Nashville SC	2026	MLS	18	1	0	0	7 (Note: Appearances in CONCACAF Champions Cup)	0	0	0	25	1
Nashville SC	Total		57	2	5	0	7	0	5	0	74	2
Huntsville City FC	2024	MLS Next Pro	1	0	—		—		—		1	0
Career total			148	6	18	0	14	0	6	0	186	6

=== International ===
As of match played 29 September 2026

Appearances and goals by national team and year
National team	Year	Apps	Goals
Australia	2024	2	0
Australia	2025	6	0
Australia	2026	3	0
Total		11	0

== Honours ==
Nashville SC

- U.S. Open Cup: 2025
