= Maxwell Woledzi =

Ghanaian footballer (born 2001)

- Woledzi with Nashville SC in 2026

Personal information
- Date of birth: 2 July 2001 (age 25)
- Place of birth: Accra, Ghana
- Height: 1.89 m (6 ft 2 in)
- Position: Centre-back

Team information
- Current team: Nashville SC
- Number: 3

Youth career
- –2019: Right to Dream Academy
- 2019–2020: Nordsjælland

Senior career*
Years	Team	Apps	(Gls)
2020–2022	Nordsjælland	28	(1)
2022–2023	Vitória SC B	13	(0)
2023–2025	Fredrikstad	73	(0)
2026–	Nashville SC	34	(2)
- * Club domestic league appearances and goals as of 7 November 2026

Maxwell Woledzi (MAX-well WOAH-leh-gee)(born 2 July 2001) is a Ghanaian professional footballer who plays as a centre-back for Major League Soccer club Nashville SC.

== Club career ==
Woledzi made his professional debut for FC Nordsjælland on 9 July 2020, starting in a 4–0 defeat against Brøndby IF.

On 24 June 2022, Woledzi joined Primeira Liga side Vitoria SC on a three-year deal.

On 13 July 2023, Woledzi joined Eliteserien club Fredrikstad, signing a three-year contract.

On 2 December 2025, Woledzi joined Major League Soccer club Nashville SC for an undisclosed fee, signing a three-year contract with an option for an additional year.

On 16 November 2026, after his first regular season with Nashville SC, Woledzi was named the MLS Defender of the Year, beating out teammates Jeisson Palacios and Andy Najar. Nashville's defence in 2026 had set MLS records for fewest goals allowed in a 34-game season (25) and most shutouts (17).

== Career statistics ==
=== Club ===
As of 16 November 2026

Appearances and goals by club, season and competition
Club	Season	League			National cup		Continental		Total	
Club	Season	Division	Apps	Goals	Apps	Goals	Apps	Goals	Apps	Goals
Nordsjælland	2019–20	Danish Superliga	4	0	0	0	—		4	0
Nordsjælland	2020–21	Danish Superliga	10	1	0	0	—		10	1
Nordsjælland	2021–22	Danish Superliga	14	0	2	0	—		16	0
Nordsjælland	Total		28	1	2	0			30	1
Vitória SC B	2022–23	Liga 3	13	0	—		—		13	0
Fredrikstad	2023	1. divisjon	15	0	0	0	—		15	0
Fredrikstad	2024	Eliteserien	29	0	6	0	—		35	0
Fredrikstad	2025	Eliteserien	27	0	5	0	—		32	0
Fredrikstad	Total		73	0	11	0			82	0
Nashville SC	2026	Major League Soccer	34	2	0	0	0	0	34	2
Career total			135	3	13	0			148	3

== Honours ==
Fredrikstad

- Norwegian Cup: 2024
- 1. divisjon: 2023

Nashville SC

- Supporters' Shield: 2026

Individual

- MLS Defender of the Year: 2026
