= Hany Mukhtar =

German footballer (born 1995)

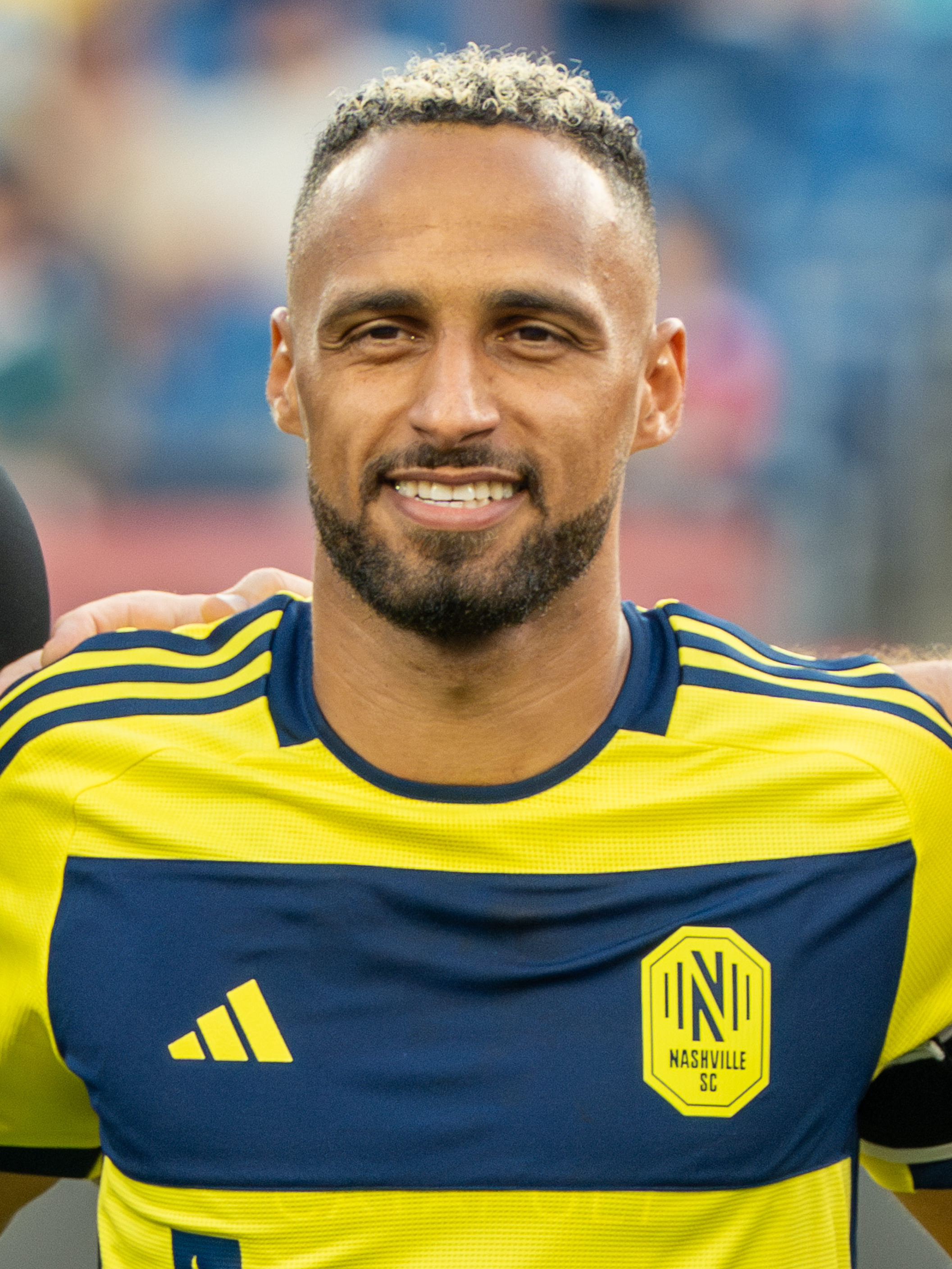
- Mukhtar with Nashville SC in 2025

Personal information
- Full name: Hany Abubakr Mukhtar
- Date of birth: 21 March 1995 (age 31)
- Place of birth: Berlin, Germany
- Height: 1.73 m (5 ft 8 in)
- Positions: Attacking midfielder; forward

Team information
- Current team: Nashville SC
- Number: 10

Youth career
- 2000–2002: FC Stern Marienfelde
- 2002–2012: Hertha BSC

Senior career*
Years	Team	Apps	(Gls)
2012–2015	Hertha BSC II	21	(7)
2012–2015	Hertha BSC	17	(0)
2015-2016	Benfica B	1	(1)
2015–2017	Benfica	1	(0)
2015–2016	→ Red Bull Salzburg (loan)	13	(1)
2016–2017	→ Brøndby (loan)	29	(6)
2017–2020	Brøndby	77	(18)
2020–	Nashville SC	213	(99)

International career^{‡}
2009–2010	Germany U15	3	(1)
2010–2011	Germany U16	10	(3)
2011	Germany U17	3	(1)
2013	Germany U18	4	(0)
2014	Germany U19	16	(9)
2014–2016	Germany U20	15	(7)
2016–2017	Germany U21	3	(0)
Medal record
Representing Germany
European Under-19 Championship
Winner	2014 Hungary
- * Club domestic league appearances and goals as of 03:22, 8 November 2026 (UTC) ‡ National team caps and goals as of 4 October 2017

Hany Abubakr Mukhtar (born 21 March 1995) is a German professional footballer who plays as an attacking midfielder or forward for Major League Soccer club Nashville SC, whom he captains.

== Club career ==
=== Hertha BSC ===
Mukhtar began playing football at a very early age, initially for FC Stern Marienfelde. He was recruited into the youth academy of then-Bundesliga club Hertha BSC at the age of seven. Rising through Hertha's ranks, he captained the club's U-17 squad to a Championship title in 2012. The following season, he joined Hertha's reserves, and was surprisingly called to the first team when Israeli international Ben Sahar missed a match for Yom Kippur. In the final minute of the match against Dynamo Dresden, Mukhtar came on as a substitute for Ronny, making him the second youngest professional debutant in Hertha's history.

=== Benfica ===
On 15 January 2015, Mukhtar signed for Portuguese champions Benfica until 2020. The transfer fee was believed to be €500,000 and Hertha BSC would allegedly participate in a potential resale. On 10 April 2015, Mukhtar debuted for the reserve team and scored a goal in a home draw against Chaves (2–2) in Segunda Liga. On 23 May, he played his first match for the first team, as a substitute in a home win against Marítimo (4–1) in their last league match of the season.

On 28 August 2015, he joined Austrian Red Bull Salzburg on a season-long loan deal. Salzburg were also granted a subsequent transfer option.

=== Brøndby ===
For the following season he was again loaned, this time to Danish club Brøndby IF. On 24 July 2016, he made his Danish Superliga debut by replacing Andrew Hjulsager for the final fifteen minutes of a 2–0 away win over Silkeborg IF. On 21 August, he scored his first goal for Brøndby in a 7–0 away rout over AGF.

On 17 April 2017, Brøndby exercised their option to sign Mukhtar permanently from Benfica. Mukthar penned a four-year contract with Brøndby which tied him to the club until the summer 2021.

On 22 April 2018, Mukhtar was awarded the Superliga Player of the Season, with him being named on the Superligaen Team of the Year by newspaper B.T. On 10 May 2018, Mukhtar played as Brøndby beat Silkeborg IF 3–1 in the Danish Cup final.

=== Nashville SC ===
On 27 August 2019, Mukhtar became the first designated player in Nashville SC franchise history. The right to sign him was acquired by Nashville SC from Seattle Sounders FC in exchange for $100,000 in general allocation money. At the time, Mukhtar had never been to the United States, but agreed to Nashville's terms because his mother was a fan of Johnny Cash and that he was aware of the singer's connection to the city. Although the transfer became official in August 2019, Mukhtar remained at Brøndby IF until 1 January 2020.

His debut with Nashville SC was disrupted by the COVID-19 pandemic, which cancelled all league matches beginning in March 2020; while the league restarted operations during the MLS is Back Tournament in July, Nashville SC withdrew from the tournament due to a COVID-19 outbreak within the team. On 12 September 2020, Mukhtar scored his first goal for Nashville in a 2–1 win over Atlanta United FC. On 17 July 2021, Mukhtar scored the first hat-trick in Nashville SC history over Chicago Fire FC. This was the fastest hat-trick from the start of a game in MLS history; Mukhtar scored in the 10th, 13th and 16th minutes. He finished the season with the most combined goals and assists in the season and was a finalist for the Landon Donovan MVP Award, which was eventually awarded to Carles Gil.

On 31 August 2022, Mukhtar scored his second hat-trick of his career in a 4–1 victory over the Colorado Rapids, the first goal of which was a penalty kick. On 1 November 2022, Mukhtar was named the 2022 Landon Donovan MLS MVP after receiving 48.03% of total votes. Mukhtar led the league with 34 goal contributions (23 goals, 11 assists) in 2022, tied for the fifth-most in a single MLS season.

On 6 May 2023, Mukhtar scored his third career hat-trick in a 3–0 victory over Chicago Fire FC, the second goal of which was a penalty kick. He was also awarded his seventh Player of the Matchday award as a result of his performance.

On 18 May 2026, Mukhtar scored a hat-trick in a Nashville's 3–2 home victory against Los Angeles FC.

== International career ==
A German youth international, Mukhtar scored the only and winning goal for the Germany U19 national team in the 2014 UEFA European Under-19 Championship final against Portugal. On 1 June 2015, he scored a hat-trick for Germany's under-20 in an 8–1 win against Fiji in his first match at the FIFA U-20 World Cup.

== Personal life ==
Mukhtar was born in Berlin, Germany, to a Polish-German mother and Sudanese father.

== Career statistics ==
As of match played 7 November 2026

Appearances and goals by club, season and competition
Club	Season	League			National cup (Note: Includes DFB-Pokal, Austrian Cup, Danish Cup, U.S. Open Cup)		Continental		Other		Total	
Club	Season	Division	Apps	Goals	Apps	Goals	Apps	Goals	Apps	Goals	Apps	Goals
Hertha BSC II	2012–13	Regionalliga Nordost	13	5	—		—		—		13	5
Hertha BSC II	2013–14	Regionalliga Nordost	2	0	—		—		—		2	0
Hertha BSC II	2014–15	Regionalliga Nordost	6	2	—		—		—		6	2
Hertha BSC II	Total		21	7	—		—		—		21	7
Hertha BSC	2012–13	2. Bundesliga	7	0	0	0	—		—		7	0
Hertha BSC	2013–14	Bundesliga	10	0	1	0	—		—		11	0
Hertha BSC	2014–15	Bundesliga	0	0	0	0	—		—		0	0
Hertha BSC	Total		17	0	1	0	—		—		18	0
Benfica B	2014–15	Segunda Liga	1	1	—		—		—		1	1
Benfica	2014–15	Primeira Liga	1	0	0	0	0	0	0	0	1	0
Red Bull Salzburg (loan)	2015–16	Austrian Bundesliga	13	1	2	0	0	0	—		15	1
Brøndby (loan)	2016–17	Danish Superliga	29	6	5	2	4 (Note: Appearances in UEFA Europa League)	1	—		38	9
Brøndby	2017–18	Danish Superliga	36	10	5	0	4	0	—		45	10
Brøndby	2018–19	Danish Superliga	29	6	3	0	4	1	—		36	7
Brøndby	2019–20	Danish Superliga	12	2	0	0	0	0	—		12	2
Brøndby	Total		106	24	13	2	12	2	—		131	28
Nashville SC	2020	MLS	15	4	—		—		3 (Note: Appearance(s) in MLS Cup playoffs)	1	18	5
Nashville SC	2021	MLS	31	16	—		—		2	3	33	19
Nashville SC	2022	MLS	33	23	3	3	—		1	0	37	26
Nashville SC	2023	MLS	34	15	1	0	—		9 (Note: Seven appearances and two goals in Leagues Cup, two appearances in MLS Cup playoffs)	2	44	17
Nashville SC	2024	MLS	32	8	—		3 (Note: Appearances in CONCACAF Champions Cup)	1	2 (Note: Appearances in Leagues Cup)	0	37	9
Nashville SC	2025	MLS	34	16	3	1	—		3	1	40	18
Nashville SC	2026	MLS	34	17	—		7	1	2	0	43	18
Nashville SC	Total		213	99	7	4	10	2	22	7	252	112
Career total			372	132	23	6	22	4	22	7	443	149

== Honours ==
Hertha BSC

- 2. Bundesliga: 2012–13

Benfica

- Primeira Liga: 2014–15

Red Bull Salzburg

- Austrian Bundesliga: 2015–16
- Austrian Cup: 2015–16

Brøndby

- Danish Cup: 2017–18

Nashville SC

- U.S. Open Cup: 2025
- Supporters' Shield: 2026

Germany U19

- UEFA Under-19 Championship: 2014

Individual

- UEFA European Under-19 Championship Team of the Tournament: 2014
- MLS Best XI: 2021, 2022, 2023
- MLS Golden Boot: 2022
- MLS All-Star: 2022, 2023, 2024, 2025, 2026
- MLS Player of the Month: August 2022, May 2023
- MLS Most Valuable Player: 2022
