= Ahmed Qasem =

Swedish-Iraqi footballer (born 2003)

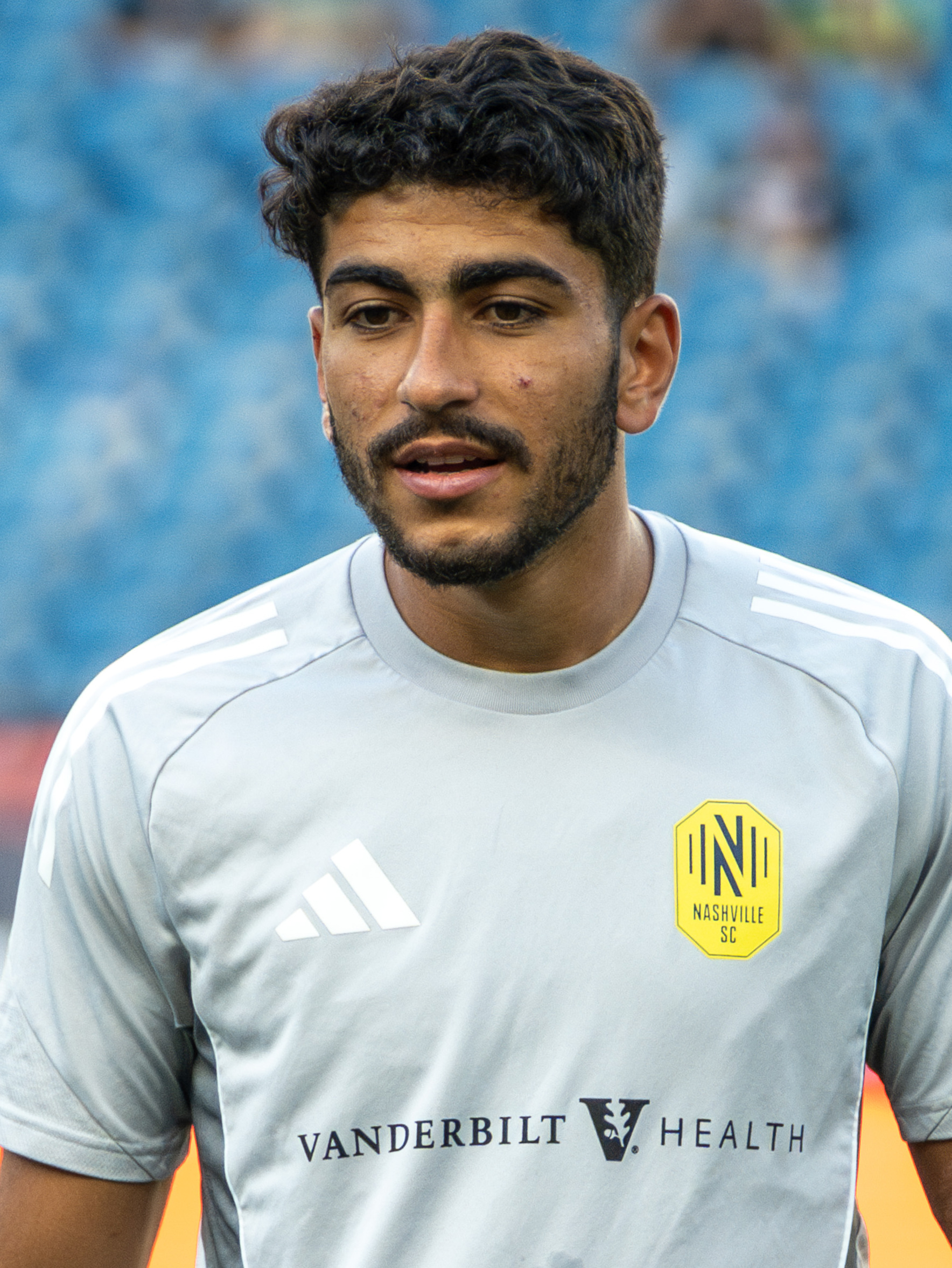
- Qasem with Nashville SC in 2025

Personal information
- Full name: Ahmed Ihab Ahmed
- Date of birth: 12 July 2003 (age 23)
- Place of birth: Motala, Sweden
- Height: 1.83 m (6 ft 0 in)
- Position: Attacking midfielder

Team information
- Current team: Nashville SC
- Number: 37

Youth career
- LSW IF
- 2018: Motala AIF

Senior career*
Years	Team	Apps	(Gls)
2019–2020	Motala AIF	54	(8)
2021–2024	IF Elfsborg	67	(7)
2025–	Nashville SC	49	(4)

International career^{‡}
2020	Sweden U17	3	(2)
2021–2022	Sweden U19	10	(3)
2023–2024	Sweden U21	5	(0)
2026–	Iraq	6	(0)
- * Club domestic league appearances and goals as of 30 August 2026 ‡ National team caps and goals as of 30 August 2026

Ahmed Ihab Ahmed, known as Ahmed Qasem (Arabic: أحمد قاسم, romanized: ʾAḥmad Qāsim pronounced [ˈ(ʔ)aħmad ˈqaː.sɪm]; born 12 July 2003), is a professional footballer who plays as an attacking midfielder for Major League Soccer club Nashville SC. Born in Sweden, he plays for the Iraq national team.

== Club career ==
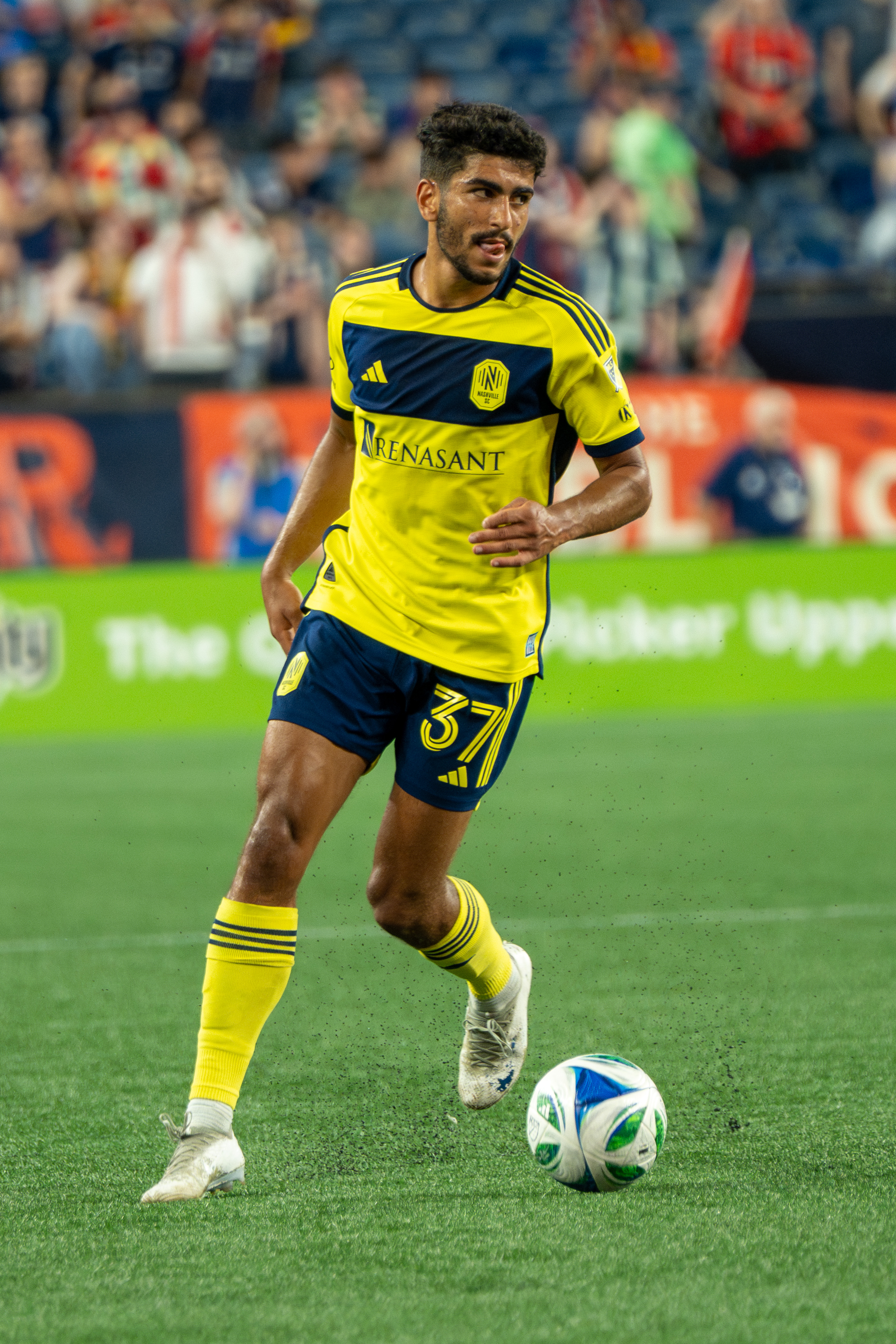
Qasem with Nashville SC in 2025

On 18 February 2025, Qasem signed with Nashville SC. Qasem made his Nashville debut on 22 February 2025 against New England Revolution. He scored his first goal for the club on 8 March 2025 against Portland Timbers.

== International career ==
Qasem represented Sweden internationally at under-17, under-18, under-19 and under-21 levels.

On 11 May 2026, Qasem's request to switch allegiance to Iraq was approved by FIFA. He was called up to the Iraq national team for the 2026 FIFA World Cup.

On 29 May 2026, Qasem made his senior international debut for Iraq in their pre-World Cup friendly against Andorra, starting the match and playing 65 minutes before being replaced by Jussef Nasrawe as Iraq continued their preparations for the upcoming FIFA World Cup.

== Personal life ==
Born in Sweden, Qasem is of Palestinian and Iraqi descent.
