= List of MLS Cup winning head coaches =

The list of MLS Cup winning head coaches includes seven head coaches who have won multiple MLS Cup titles — Bruce Arena, who has won MLS Cup five times, and Sigi Schmid, Frank Yallop, Dominic Kinnear, Brian Schmetzer, Caleb Porter and Greg Vanney, who have each won MLS Cup twice.

To date, four head coaches have led two different clubs to win the MLS Cup: Sigi Schmid (with Los Angeles Galaxy in 2002 and Columbus Crew in 2008), Bruce Arena (with D.C. United in 1996 and 1997 and LA Galaxy in 2011, 2012 and 2014), Caleb Porter (with Portland Timbers in 2015 and Columbus Crew in 2020) and Greg Vanney (with Toronto FC in 2017 and LA Galaxy in 2024).

Only two head coaches have won the playoffs as both a player and head coach. Piotr Nowak played for Chicago Fire during their 1998 MLS Cup title (in which he was named the Man of the Match), and subsequently led D.C. United as a coach to their fourth MLS Cup title in 2004. Peter Vermes won the 2000 MLS Cup with Sporting Kansas City (then known as the Kansas City Wizards) as a player, then won MLS Cup with the same team as a coach in 2013. The next closest head coaches to such an achievement are Dominic Kinnear and Greg Vanney. Kinnear was on the Colorado Rapids squad that lost the 1997 MLS Cup final; however, he led the Houston Dynamo to two straight MLS Cup titles in 2006 and 2007. Vanney was on the LA Galaxy roster that finished as runners-up in 1996 and 2001, and coached Toronto FC and the LA Galaxy to victory in 2017 and 2024, respectively.

Wilfried Nancy led the Columbus Crew to an MLS Cup victory in 2023 and became the first Black manager of a cup-winning team.

== Winning head coaches ==
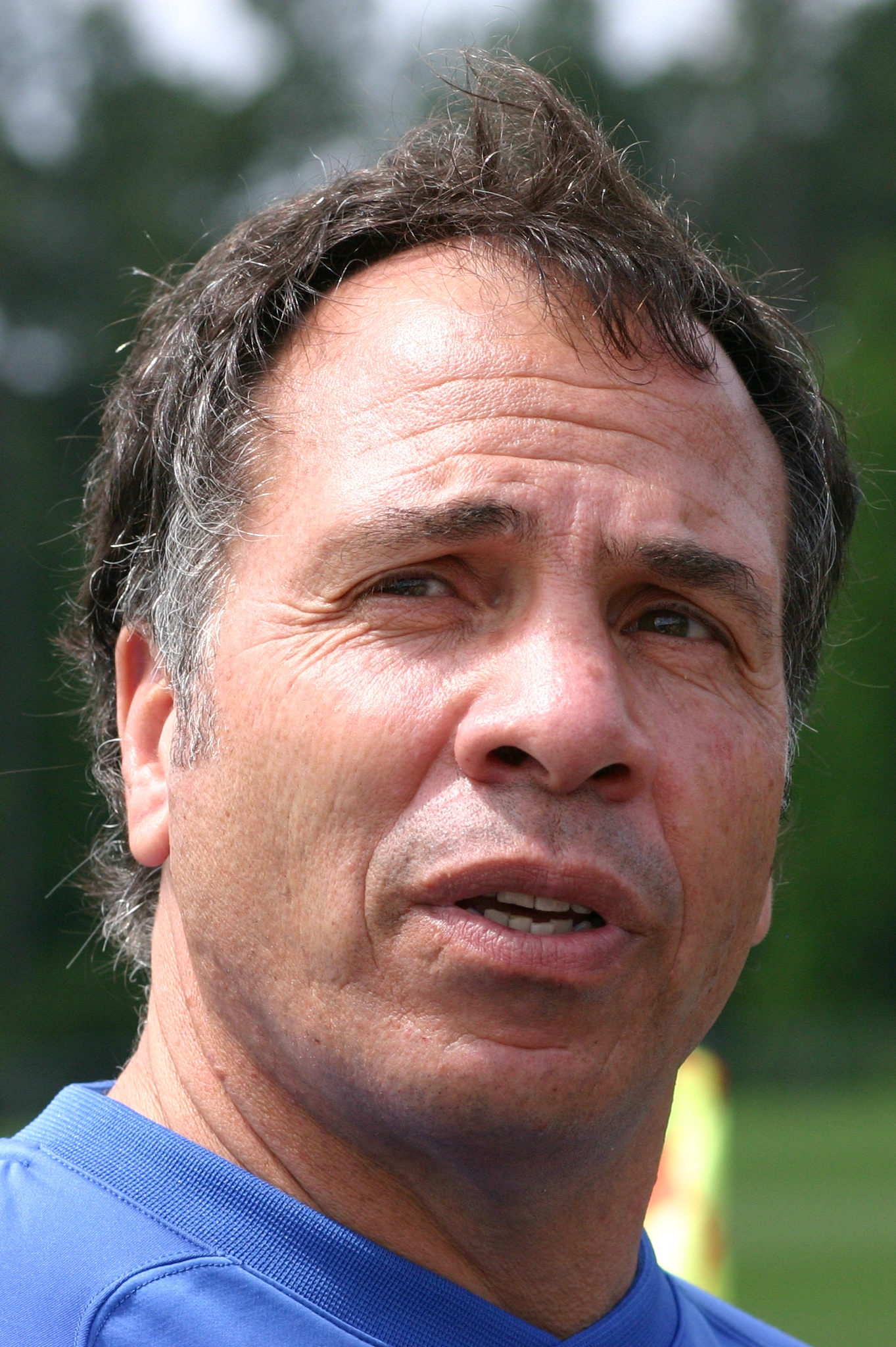
Bruce Arena, winning head coach in 1996, 1997, 2011, 2012 and 2014

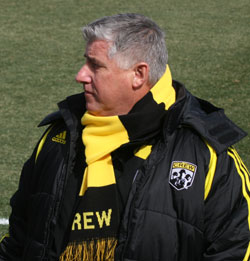
Sigi Schmid, winning head coach in 2002 and 2008

Final	Winning head coach	Nationality	Club
1996	Bruce Arena	United States	D.C. United
1997	Bruce Arena (2)	United States	D.C. United
1998	Bob Bradley	United States	Chicago Fire
1999	Thomas Rongen	Netherlands	D.C. United
2000	Bob Gansler	United States	Kansas City Wizards
2001	Frank Yallop	Canada	San Jose Earthquakes
2002	Sigi Schmid	Germany	Los Angeles Galaxy
2003	Frank Yallop (2)	Canada	San Jose Earthquakes
2004	Piotr Nowak	Poland	D.C. United
2005	Steve Sampson	United States	Los Angeles Galaxy
2006	Dominic Kinnear	United States	Houston Dynamo
2007	Dominic Kinnear (2)	United States	Houston Dynamo
2008	Sigi Schmid (2)	Germany	Columbus Crew
2009	Jason Kreis	United States	Real Salt Lake
2010	Gary Smith	England	Colorado Rapids
2011	Bruce Arena (3)	United States	LA Galaxy
2012	Bruce Arena (4)	United States	LA Galaxy
2013	Peter Vermes	United States	Sporting Kansas City
2014	Bruce Arena (5)	United States	LA Galaxy
2015	Caleb Porter	United States	Portland Timbers
2016	Brian Schmetzer	United States	Seattle Sounders FC
2017	Greg Vanney	United States	Toronto FC
2018	Gerardo Martino	Argentina	Atlanta United FC
2019	Brian Schmetzer (2)	United States	Seattle Sounders FC
2020	Caleb Porter (2)	United States	Columbus Crew SC
2021	Ronny Deila	Norway	New York City FC
2022	Steve Cherundolo	United States	Los Angeles FC
2023	Wilfried Nancy	France	Columbus Crew
2024	Greg Vanney (2)	United States	LA Galaxy
2025	Javier Mascherano	Argentina	Inter Miami CF

== Coaches with multiple MLS Cup victories ==
Wins	Head coach	Team(s) won with (years)	MLS coaching career
5	Bruce Arena	D.C. United (1996, 1997); LA Galaxy (2011, 2012, 2014)	1996–1998; 2006–2016; 2019–2023
2	Sigi Schmid	Los Angeles Galaxy (2002); Columbus Crew (2008)	1999–2004; 2006–2018
2	Frank Yallop	San Jose Earthquakes (2001, 2003)	2001–2003; 2006–2015
2	Dominic Kinnear	Houston Dynamo (2006, 2007)	2004–2018
2	Brian Schmetzer	Seattle Sounders FC (2016, 2019)	2016–present
2	Caleb Porter	Portland Timbers (2015); Columbus Crew SC (2020)	2013–2017; 2019–2022
2	Greg Vanney	Toronto FC (2017); LA Galaxy (2024)	2014–present

== By nationality ==
Nation	Head coaches	Total
United States	11	19
Argentina	2	2
Canada	1	2
Germany	1	2
France	1	1
England	1	1
Norway	1	1
Netherlands	1	1
Poland	1	1

== See also ==
- List of Major League Soccer head coaches
