= List of Major League Soccer head coaches =

The following is a list of Major League Soccer head coaches — including lists of current head coaches and head coaches with most wins. Major League Soccer is a Division 1 professional soccer league, with 30 teams — 27 in the United States and 3 in Canada.

== Current MLS head coaches ==
Coach	Nationality	Age	Club	Date appointed	Time as coach	Played in MLS
Gerardo Martino	Argentina	63	Atlanta United FC	November 6, 2025	1 year, 4 days	N/A
Davy Arnaud (interim)	United States	46	Austin FC	May 18, 2026	176 days	2002–2015
Dean Smith	England	55	Charlotte FC	December 12, 2023	2 years, 333 days	N/A
Gregg Berhalter	United States	53	Chicago Fire FC	October 8, 2024	2 years, 33 days	2009–2011
Pat Noonan	United States	46	FC Cincinnati	December 14, 2021	5 years, 27 days	2003–2007; 2008–2012
Matt Wells	England	38	Colorado Rapids	December 23, 2025	322 days	N/A
Laurent Courtois (interim)	France	48	Columbus Crew	May 17, 2026	177 days	2011–2013
Eric Quill	United States	48	FC Dallas	November 21, 2024	1 year, 354 days	1997–2005
René Weiler	Switzerland	53	D.C. United	July 16, 2025	1 year, 117 days	N/A
Ben Olsen	United States	49	Houston Dynamo FC	November 8, 2022	4 years, 2 days	1998–2009
Kily González	Argentina	52	Inter Miami CF	September 15, 2026	56 days	N/A
Greg Vanney	United States	52	LA Galaxy	January 5, 2021	5 years, 309 days	1996–2001; 2005–2008
Xavi Tamarit (interim)	Spain	44	Los Angeles FC	October 1, 2026	40 days	N/A
Cameron Knowles	New Zealand	44	Minnesota United FC	January 12, 2026	302 days	2005–2011
Philippe Eullaffroy (interim)	France	62	CF Montréal	April 12, 2026	212 days	N/A
B. J. Callaghan	United States	45	Nashville SC	July 22, 2024	2 years, 111 days	N/A
Marko Mitrović	Serbia	48	New England Revolution	November 7, 2025	1 year, 3 days	N/A
Pascal Jansen	Netherlands	53	New York City FC	January 6, 2025	1 year, 308 days	N/A
Michael Bradley	United States	39	New York Red Bulls	December 15, 2025	330 days	2004–2005; 2014–2023
Martín Perelman (interim)	Argentina	40	Orlando City SC	March 11, 2026	244 days	N/A
Ryan Richter (interim)	United States	37	Philadelphia Union	May 27, 2026	167 days	2011; 2013–2014
Martí Cifuentes	Spain	44	Portland Timbers	August 11, 2026	91 days	N/A
Pablo Mastroeni	United States	50	Real Salt Lake	August 27, 2021	5 years, 75 days	1998–2013
Mikey Varas	United States	43	San Diego FC	September 16, 2024	2 years, 55 days	N/A
Bruce Arena	United States	75	San Jose Earthquakes	November 7, 2024	2 years, 3 days	N/A
Brian Schmetzer	United States	64	Seattle Sounders FC	July 26, 2016	10 years, 107 days	N/A (Note: Schmetzer played for previous incarnations of the Sounders prior to the establishment as an MLS team, including four years on the NASL team and one year on the APSL team.)
Raphaël Wicky	Switzerland	49	Sporting Kansas City	January 5, 2026	309 days	2008
Yoann Damet	France	36	St. Louis City SC	December 16, 2025	329 days	N/A
Robin Fraser	United States	59	Toronto FC	January 10, 2025	1 year, 304 days	1996–2005
Jesper Sørensen	Denmark	53	Vancouver Whitecaps FC	January 14, 2025	1 year, 300 days	N/A

== Most coaching wins ==
=== Regular season wins ===
1. **Bruce Arena** (267)
2. Sigi Schmid (240)
3. Peter Vermes (203)
4. Bob Bradley (194)
5. Óscar Pareja (178)
6. Dominic Kinnear (170)
7. **Brian Schmetzer** (146)
8. **Ben Olsen** (144)
9. **Greg Vanney** (141)
10. Jim Curtin (141)

Notes

- Last updated: Middle of 2025 regular season
- Coaches in bold are still coaching in MLS.

=== Postseason wins ===
1. **Bruce Arena** (35)
2. Sigi Schmid (26)
3. **Brian Schmetzer** (17)
4. **Greg Vanney** (16)
5. Bob Bradley (15)
6. Dominic Kinnear (15)

== Achievements ==
The following table shows the MLS head coaches that have won the Coach of the Year, MLS Cup, or Supporters' Shield at least twice.

Coach	Coach of the Year	MLS Cup	Supporters' Shield
Bruce Arena	4 (1997, 2009, 2011, 2021)	5 (1996, 1997, 2011, 2012, 2014)	4 (1997, 2010, 2011, 2021)
Bob Bradley	3 (1998, 2006, 2019)	1 (1998)	1 (2019)
Sigi Schmid	2 (1999, 2008)	2 (2002, 2008)	3 (2002, 2008, 2014)
Frank Yallop	2 (2001, 2012)	2 (2001, 2003)	1 (2012)
Jim Curtin	2 (2020, 2022)	—	1 (2020)
Dominic Kinnear	1 (2005)	2 (2006, 2007)	1 (2005)
Greg Vanney	1 (2017)	2 (2017, 2024)	1 (2017)
Caleb Porter	1 (2013)	2 (2015, 2020)	—
Thomas Rongen	1 (1996)	1 (1999)	2 (1996, 1999)
Brian Schmetzer	—	2 (2016, 2019)	—

== List of all-time coaches ==
The list of coaches includes everyone who has coached a club while they were in the MLS, whether in a permanent or temporary role. Interim coaches are listed only when they managed the team for at least one match in that period.

Coaches highlighted in yellow and in italics are currently head coach of the listed MLS club.

As of November 9, 2026.

Coach	Nationality	Club	From	Until
Gerardo Martino	Argentina	Atlanta United FC	2017	2018
Frank de Boer	Netherlands	Atlanta United FC	2019	2020
Stephen Glass (interim)	Scotland	Atlanta United FC	2020	2020
Gabriel Heinze	Argentina	Atlanta United FC	2021	2021
Rob Valentino (interim)	United States	Atlanta United FC	2021	2021
Gonzalo Pineda	Mexico	Atlanta United FC	2021	2024
Rob Valentino (interim)	United States	Atlanta United FC	2024	2024
Ronny Deila	Norway	Atlanta United FC	2025	2025
Gerardo Martino	Argentina	Atlanta United FC	2026	present
Josh Wolff	United States	Austin FC	2021	2024
Nico Estévez	Spain	Austin FC	2025	2026
Davy Arnaud (interim)	United States	Austin FC	2026	2026
Miguel Ángel Ramírez	Spain	Charlotte FC	2022	2022
Christian Lattanzio	Italy	Charlotte FC	2022	2023
Dean Smith	England	Charlotte FC	2024	present
Bob Bradley	United States	Chicago Fire	1998	2002
Dave Sarachan	United States	Chicago Fire	2003	2007
Denis Hamlett (interim)	Costa Rica	Chicago Fire	2007	2007
Juan Carlos Osorio	Colombia	Chicago Fire	2007	2007
Denis Hamlett	Costa Rica	Chicago Fire	2008	2009
Carlos de los Cobos	Mexico	Chicago Fire	2010	2011
Frank Klopas	United States	Chicago Fire	2011	2013
Frank Yallop	Canada	Chicago Fire	2014	2015
Brian Bliss (interim)	United States	Chicago Fire	2015	2015
Veljko Paunović	Serbia	Chicago Fire	2016	2019
Raphaël Wicky	Switzerland	Chicago Fire	2020	2021
Frank Klopas (interim)	United States	Chicago Fire	2021	2021
Ezra Hendrickson	Saint Vincent and the Grenadines	Chicago Fire	2022	2023
Frank Klopas	United States	Chicago Fire	2023	2024
Gregg Berhalter	United States	Chicago Fire	2025	present
Thomas Rongen	Netherlands	Chivas USA	2005	2005
Javier Ledesma (interim)	Mexico	Chivas USA	2005	2005
Hans Westerhof	Netherlands	Chivas USA	2005	2005
Bob Bradley	United States	Chivas USA	2006	2006
Preki	United States	Chivas USA	2007	2009
Martín Vásquez	United States	Chivas USA	2010	2010
Robin Fraser	United States	Chivas USA	2011	2012
Chelís	Mexico	Chivas USA	2013	2013
Sacha van der Most (interim)	Netherlands	Chivas USA	2013	2013
José Luis Real	Mexico	Chivas USA	2013	2013
Wílmer Cabrera	Colombia	Chivas USA	2014	2014
Alan Koch	South Africa	FC Cincinnati	2019	2019
Yoann Damet (interim)	France	FC Cincinnati	2019	2019
Ron Jans	Netherlands	FC Cincinnati	2019	2020
Yoann Damet (interim)	France	FC Cincinnati	2020	2020
Jaap Stam	Netherlands	FC Cincinnati	2020	2021
Tyrone Marshall (interim)	Jamaica	FC Cincinnati	2021	2021
Pat Noonan	United States	FC Cincinnati	2022	present
Bobby Houghton	England	Colorado Rapids	1996	1996
Roy Wegerle (interim)	United States	Colorado Rapids	1996	1996
Glenn Myernick	United States	Colorado Rapids	1997	2000
Tim Hankinson	United States	Colorado Rapids	2001	2004
Fernando Clavijo	United States	Colorado Rapids	2005	2008
Gary Smith	England	Colorado Rapids	2008	2011
Óscar Pareja	Colombia	Colorado Rapids	2012	2013
Pablo Mastroeni	United States	Colorado Rapids	2014	2017
Steve Cooke (interim)	England	Colorado Rapids	2017	2017
Anthony Hudson	England	Colorado Rapids	2017	2019
Conor Casey (interim)	United States	Colorado Rapids	2019	2019
Robin Fraser	United States	Colorado Rapids	2019	2023
Chris Little (interim)	Scotland	Colorado Rapids	2023	2023
Chris Armas	United States	Colorado Rapids	2024	2025
Matt Wells	England	Colorado Rapids	2026	present
Timo Liekoski	Finland	Columbus Crew	1996	1996
Tom Fitzgerald	United States	Columbus Crew	1996	2001
Greg Andrulis	United States	Columbus Crew	2001	2005
Robert Warzycha (interim)	Poland	Columbus Crew	2005	2005
Sigi Schmid	United States	Columbus Crew	2006	2008
Robert Warzycha	Poland	Columbus Crew	2009	2013
Brian Bliss (interim)	United States	Columbus Crew	2013	2013
Gregg Berhalter	United States	Columbus Crew	2014	2018
Caleb Porter	United States	Columbus Crew	2019	2022
Wilfried Nancy	France	Columbus Crew	2023	2025
Henrik Rydström	Sweden	Columbus Crew	2026	2026
Laurent Courtois (interim)	France	Columbus Crew	2026	present
Dave Dir	United States	Dallas Burn	1996	2000
Mike Jeffries	United States	Dallas Burn	2001	2003
Colin Clarke	Northern Ireland	Dallas Burn/FC Dallas	2003	2006
Steve Morrow	Northern Ireland	FC Dallas	2007	2008
Marco Ferruzzi (interim)	United States	FC Dallas	2008	2008
Schellas Hyndman	United States	FC Dallas	2008	2013
Óscar Pareja	Colombia	FC Dallas	2014	2018
Luchi Gonzalez	United States	FC Dallas	2019	2021
Marco Ferruzzi (interim)	United States	FC Dallas	2021	2021
Nico Estévez	Spain	FC Dallas	2022	2024
Peter Luccin (interim)	France	FC Dallas	2024	2024
Eric Quill	United States	FC Dallas	2025	present
Bruce Arena	United States	D.C. United	1996	1998
Thomas Rongen	Netherlands	D.C. United	1999	2001
Ray Hudson	England	D.C. United	2002	2003
Piotr Nowak	Poland	D.C. United	2004	2006
Tom Soehn	United States	D.C. United	2006	2009
Curt Onalfo	United States	D.C. United	2010	2010
Ben Olsen	United States	D.C. United	2010	2020
Chad Ashton (interim)	United States	D.C. United	2020	2020
Hernán Losada	Argentina	D.C. United	2021	2022
Chad Ashton (interim)	United States	D.C. United	2022	2022
Wayne Rooney	England	D.C. United	2022	2023
Troy Lesesne	United States	D.C. United	2024	2025
Kevin Flanagan (interim)	United States	D.C. United	2025	2025
René Weiler	Switzerland	D.C. United	2025	present
Dominic Kinnear	United States	Houston Dynamo	2006	2014
Owen Coyle	Republic of Ireland	Houston Dynamo	2015	2016
Wade Barrett (interim)	United States	Houston Dynamo	2016	2016
Wílmer Cabrera	Colombia	Houston Dynamo	2017	2019
Davy Arnaud (interim)	United States	Houston Dynamo	2019	2019
Tab Ramos	United States	Houston Dynamo	2020	2021
Paulo Nagamura	Brazil	Houston Dynamo	2022	2022
Kenny Bundy (interim)	United States	Houston Dynamo	2022	2022
Ben Olsen	United States	Houston Dynamo	2023	present
Diego Alonso	Uruguay	Inter Miami CF	2020	2020
Phil Neville	England	Inter Miami CF	2021	2023
Javier Morales (interim)	Argentina	Inter Miami CF	2023	2023
Gerardo Martino	Argentina	Inter Miami CF	2023	2024
Javier Mascherano	Argentina	Inter Miami CF	2025	2026
Guillermo Hoyos (interim)	Argentina	Inter Miami CF	2026	2026
Kily González	Argentina	Inter Miami CF	2026	present
Ron Newman	England	Kansas City Wiz/Wizards	1996	1999
Ken Fogarty (interim)	England	Kansas City Wizards	1999	1999
Bob Gansler	United States	Kansas City Wizards	1999	2006
Brian Bliss (interim)	United States	Kansas City Wizards	2006	2006
Curt Onalfo	United States	Kansas City Wizards	2007	2009
Peter Vermes	United States	Kansas City Wizards/Sporting Kansas City	2009	2025
Kerry Zavagnin (interim)	United States	Sporting Kansas City	2025	2025
Raphaël Wicky	Switzerland	Sporting Kansas City	2026	2026
Lothar Osiander	Germany	LA Galaxy	1996	1997
Octavio Zambrano	Ecuador	LA Galaxy	1997	1999
Sigi Schmid	United States	LA Galaxy	1999	2004
Steve Sampson	United States	LA Galaxy	2004	2006
Frank Yallop	Canada	LA Galaxy	2006	2007
Ruud Gullit	Netherlands	LA Galaxy	2008	2008
Cobi Jones (interim)	United States	LA Galaxy	2008	2008
Bruce Arena	United States	LA Galaxy	2008	2016
Curt Onalfo	United States	LA Galaxy	2017	2017
Sigi Schmid	United States	LA Galaxy	2017	2018
Dominic Kinnear (interim)	United States	LA Galaxy	2018	2018
Guillermo Barros Schelotto	Argentina	LA Galaxy	2019	2020
Dominic Kinnear (interim)	United States	LA Galaxy	2020	2020
Greg Vanney	United States	LA Galaxy	2021	present
Bob Bradley	United States	Los Angeles FC	2018	2021
Steve Cherundolo	United States	Los Angeles FC	2022	2025
Marc Dos Santos	Canada	Los Angeles FC	2026	2026
Xavi Tamarit (interim)	Spain	Los Angeles FC	2026	present
Carlos Córdoba	Argentina	Miami Fusion	1998	1998
Ivo Wortmann	Brazil	Miami Fusion	1998	2000
Ray Hudson	England	Miami Fusion	2000	2001
Adrian Heath	England	Minnesota United FC	2017	2023
Sean McAuley (interim)	England	Minnesota United FC	2023	2023
Cameron Knowles (interim)	New Zealand	Minnesota United FC	2024	2024
Eric Ramsay	Wales	Minnesota United FC	2024	2025
Cameron Knowles	New Zealand	Minnesota United FC	2026	present
Jesse Marsch	United States	Montreal Impact	2012	2012
Marco Schällibaum	Switzerland	Montreal Impact	2013	2013
Frank Klopas	United States	Montreal Impact	2014	2015
Mauro Biello	Canada	Montreal Impact	2015	2017
Rémi Garde	France	Montreal Impact	2017	2019
Wílmer Cabrera	Colombia	Montreal Impact	2019	2019
Thierry Henry	France	Montreal Impact	2020	2020
Wilfried Nancy	France	CF Montréal	2021	2022
Hernán Losada	Argentina	CF Montréal	2023	2023
Laurent Courtois	France	CF Montréal	2024	2025
Marco Donadel	Italy	CF Montréal	2025	2026
Philippe Eullaffroy (interim)	France	CF Montréal	2026	present
Gary Smith	England	Nashville SC	2020	2024
Rumba Munthali (interim)	Canada	Nashville SC	2024	2024
B. J. Callaghan	United States	Nashville SC	2024	present
Frank Stapleton	Republic of Ireland	New England Revolution	1996	1996
Thomas Rongen	Netherlands	New England Revolution	1997	1998
Walter Zenga	Italy	New England Revolution	1999	1999
Steve Nicol (interim)	Scotland	New England Revolution	1999	1999
Fernando Clavijo	United States	New England Revolution	2000	2002
Steve Nicol	Scotland	New England Revolution	2002	2011
Jay Heaps	United States	New England Revolution	2012	2017
Brad Friedel	United States	New England Revolution	2017	2019
Mike Lapper (interim)	United States	New England Revolution	2019	2019
Bruce Arena	United States	New England Revolution	2019	2023
Richie Williams (interim)	United States	New England Revolution	2023	2023
Clint Peay (interim)	United States	New England Revolution	2023	2023
Caleb Porter	United States	New England Revolution	2024	2025
Pablo Moreira (interim)	Uruguay	New England Revolution	2025	2025
Marko Mitrović	Serbia	New England Revolution	2026	present
Jason Kreis	United States	New York City FC	2015	2015
Patrick Vieira	France	New York City FC	2016	2018
Domènec Torrent	Spain	New York City FC	2018	2019
Ronny Deila	Norway	New York City FC	2020	2022
Nick Cushing	England	New York City FC	2022	2024
Pascal Jansen	Netherlands	New York City FC	2025	2026
Eddie Firmani	Italy	New York/New Jersey MetroStars	1996	1996
Carlos Queiroz	Portugal	New York/New Jersey MetroStars	1996	1996
Carlos Alberto Parreira	Brazil	New York/New Jersey MetroStars	1997	1997
Alfonso Mondelo	Spain	MetroStars	1998	1998
Bora Milutinović	Serbia	MetroStars	1998	1999
Octavio Zambrano	Ecuador	MetroStars	2000	2002
Bob Bradley	United States	MetroStars	2003	2005
Mo Johnston	Scotland	MetroStars/New York Red Bulls	2005	2006
Richie Williams (interim)	United States	New York Red Bulls	2006	2006
Bruce Arena	United States	New York Red Bulls	2006	2007
Juan Carlos Osorio	Colombia	New York Red Bulls	2008	2009
Richie Williams (interim)	United States	New York Red Bulls	2009	2009
Hans Backe	Sweden	New York Red Bulls	2010	2012
Mike Petke	United States	New York Red Bulls	2013	2014
Jesse Marsch	United States	New York Red Bulls	2015	2018
Chris Armas	United States	New York Red Bulls	2018	2020
Bradley Carnell (interim)	South Africa	New York Red Bulls	2020	2020
Gerhard Struber	Austria	New York Red Bulls	2020	2023
Troy Lesesne	United States	New York Red Bulls	2023	2023
Sandro Schwarz	Germany	New York Red Bulls	2024	2025
Michael Bradley	United States	New York Red Bulls	2026	present
Adrian Heath	England	Orlando City SC	2015	2016
Bobby Murphy (interim)	United States	Orlando City SC	2016	2016
Jason Kreis	United States	Orlando City SC	2016	2018
Bobby Murphy (interim)	United States	Orlando City SC	2018	2018
James O'Connor	Republic of Ireland	Orlando City SC	2018	2019
Óscar Pareja	Colombia	Orlando City SC	2020	2026
Martín Perelman (interim)	Argentina	Orlando City SC	2026	present
Piotr Nowak	Poland	Philadelphia Union	2010	2012
John Hackworth	United States	Philadelphia Union	2012	2014
Jim Curtin	United States	Philadelphia Union	2014	2024
Bradley Carnell	South Africa	Philadelphia Union	2025	2026
Ryan Richter (interim)	United States	Philadelphia Union	2026	present
John Spencer	Scotland	Portland Timbers	2011	2012
Gavin Wilkinson (interim)	New Zealand	Portland Timbers	2012	2012
Caleb Porter	United States	Portland Timbers	2013	2017
Giovanni Savarese	Venezuela	Portland Timbers	2018	2023
Miles Joseph (interim)	United States	Portland Timbers	2023	2023
Phil Neville	England	Portland Timbers	2024	2026
Jack Cassidy (interim)	Republic of Ireland	Portland Timbers	2026	2026
Martí Cifuentes	Spain	Portland Timbers	2026	present
John Ellinger	United States	Real Salt Lake	2005	2007
Jason Kreis	United States	Real Salt Lake	2007	2013
Jeff Cassar	United States	Real Salt Lake	2014	2017
Daryl Shore (interim)	United States	Real Salt Lake	2017	2017
Mike Petke	United States	Real Salt Lake	2017	2019
Freddy Juarez	United States	Real Salt Lake	2019	2021
Pablo Mastroeni	United States	Real Salt Lake	2021	present
Mikey Varas	United States	San Diego FC	2025	present
Laurie Calloway	England	San Jose Clash	1996	1997
Brian Quinn	Northern Ireland	San Jose Clash	1997	1999
Jorge Espinoza (interim)	Chile	San Jose Clash	1999	1999
Lothar Osiander	Germany	San Jose Clash/Earthquakes	1999	2000
Frank Yallop	Canada	San Jose Earthquakes	2001	2003
Dominic Kinnear	United States	San Jose Earthquakes	2004	2005
Frank Yallop	Canada	San Jose Earthquakes	2008	2013
Mark Watson	Canada	San Jose Earthquakes	2013	2014
Ian Russell (interim)	United States	San Jose Earthquakes	2014	2014
Dominic Kinnear	United States	San Jose Earthquakes	2015	2017
Chris Leitch	United States	San Jose Earthquakes	2017	2017
Mikael Stahre	Sweden	San Jose Earthquakes	2017	2018
Steve Ralston (interim)	United States	San Jose Earthquakes	2018	2018
Matías Almeyda	Argentina	San Jose Earthquakes	2019	2022
Alex Covelo (interim)	Spain	San Jose Earthquakes	2022	2022
Luchi Gonzalez	United States	San Jose Earthquakes	2023	2024
Ian Russell (interim)	United States	San Jose Earthquakes	2024	2024
Bruce Arena	United States	San Jose Earthquakes	2025	present
Sigi Schmid	United States	Seattle Sounders FC	2009	2016
Brian Schmetzer	United States	Seattle Sounders FC	2016	present
Bradley Carnell	South Africa	St. Louis City SC	2023	2024
John Hackworth (interim)	United States	St. Louis City SC	2024	2024
Olof Mellberg	Sweden	St. Louis City SC	2025	2025
David Critchley (interim)	United States	St. Louis City SC	2025	2025
Yoann Damet	France	St. Louis City SC	2026	present
Thomas Rongen	Netherlands	Tampa Bay Mutiny	1996	1996
John Kowalski	United States	Tampa Bay Mutiny	1997	1998
Tim Hankinson	United States	Tampa Bay Mutiny	1998	2000
Alfonso Mondelo	Spain	Tampa Bay Mutiny	2001	2001
Perry Van der Beck	United States	Tampa Bay Mutiny	2001	2001
Mo Johnston	Scotland	Toronto FC	2007	2007
John Carver	England	Toronto FC	2008	2009
Chris Cummins (interim)	England	Toronto FC	2009	2009
Preki	United States	Toronto FC	2010	2010
Nick Dasovic (interim)	Canada	Toronto FC	2010	2010
Aron Winter	Netherlands	Toronto FC	2011	2012
Paul Mariner	England	Toronto FC	2012	2012
Ryan Nelsen	New Zealand	Toronto FC	2013	2014
Greg Vanney	United States	Toronto FC	2014	2020
Chris Armas	United States	Toronto FC	2021	2021
Javier Pérez	Spain	Toronto FC	2021	2021
Bob Bradley	United States	Toronto FC	2022	2023
Terry Dunfield (interim)	Canada	Toronto FC	2023	2023
John Herdman	England	Toronto FC	2023	2024
Robin Fraser	United States	Toronto FC	2025	2026
Teitur Thordarson	Iceland	Vancouver Whitecaps FC	2011	2011
Tom Soehn (interim)	United States	Vancouver Whitecaps FC	2011	2011
Martin Rennie	Scotland	Vancouver Whitecaps FC	2012	2013
Carl Robinson	Wales	Vancouver Whitecaps FC	2014	2018
Craig Dalrymple (interim)	England	Vancouver Whitecaps FC	2018	2018
Marc Dos Santos	Canada	Vancouver Whitecaps FC	2019	2021
Vanni Sartini	Italy	Vancouver Whitecaps FC	2021	2024
Jesper Sørensen	Denmark	Vancouver Whitecaps FC	2025	present

== See also ==
- Sigi Schmid Coach of the Year Award
- List of MLS Cup winning head coaches
