= Sigi Schmid Coach of the Year Award =

North American soccer award

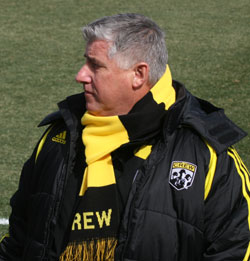
Sigi Schmid is a two-time winner and the namesake of the Coach of the Year Award.

The Sigi Schmid Coach of the Year Award is given by Major League Soccer to the best coach in any given season. The award has been given since the league's inception in 1996 and is determined by a vote from players, club personnel, and members of the media. Bruce Arena has won the award four times, more than any other coach.

The award was renamed in January 2019 for Sigi Schmid, the coach with the most league regular season wins and two-time award winner, shortly after his death.

Thomas Rongen won the inaugural award with the now defunct Tampa Bay Mutiny for the 1996 Major League Soccer season.

== Winners ==
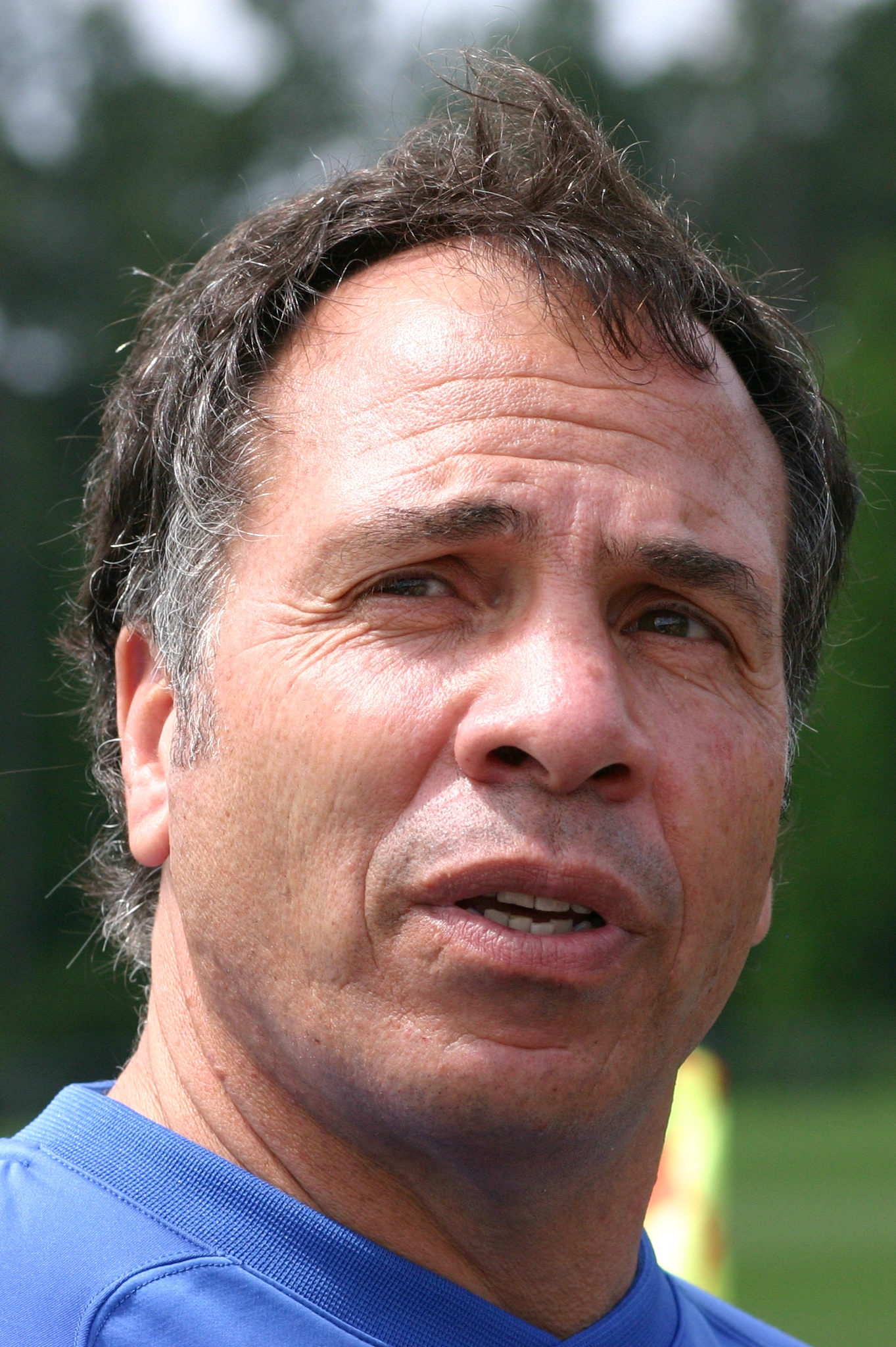
With four wins, Bruce Arena has won the award more than any other coach.

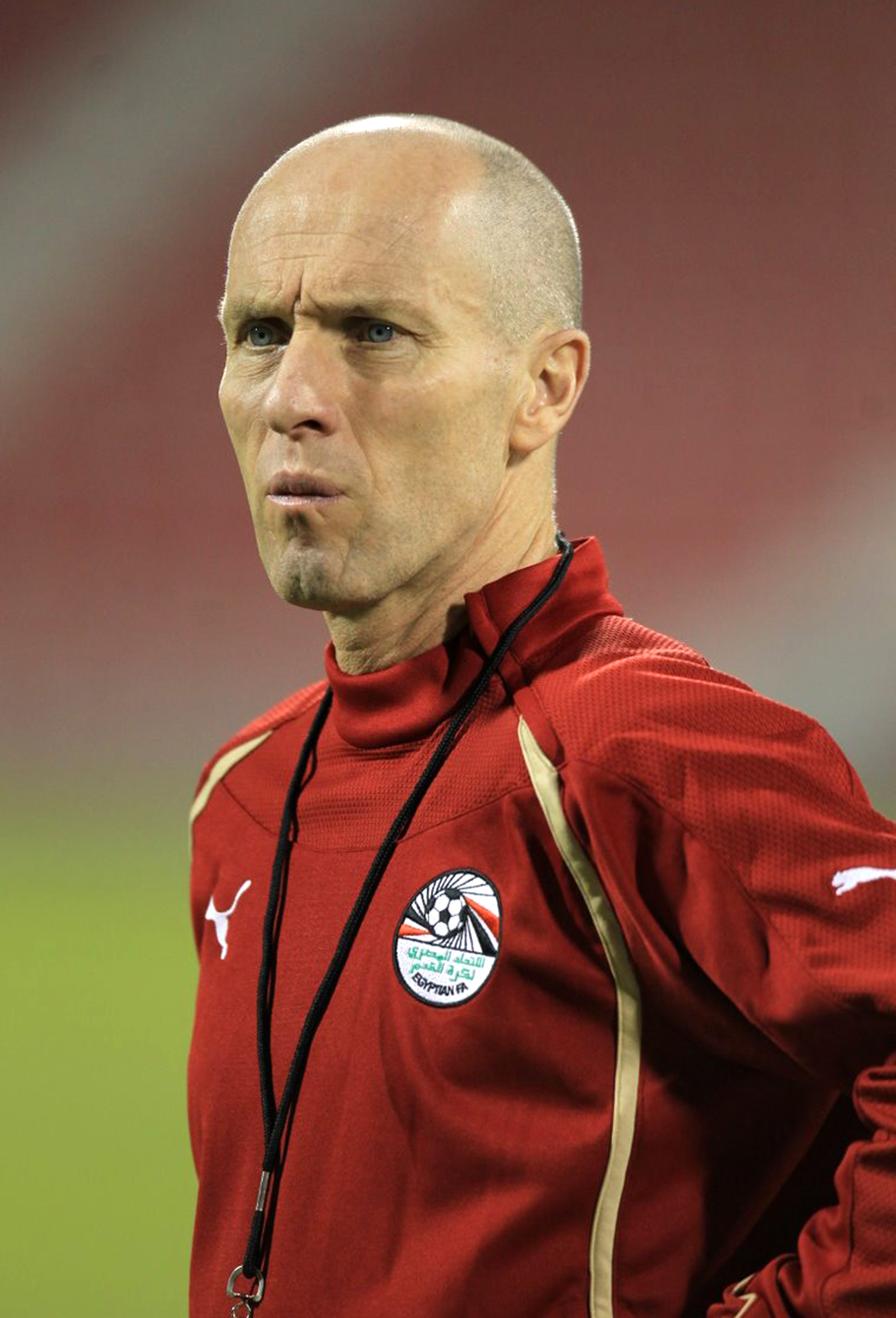
Bob Bradley has won the award three times, each one with a separate team: Chicago Fire, Chivas USA, and Los Angeles FC.

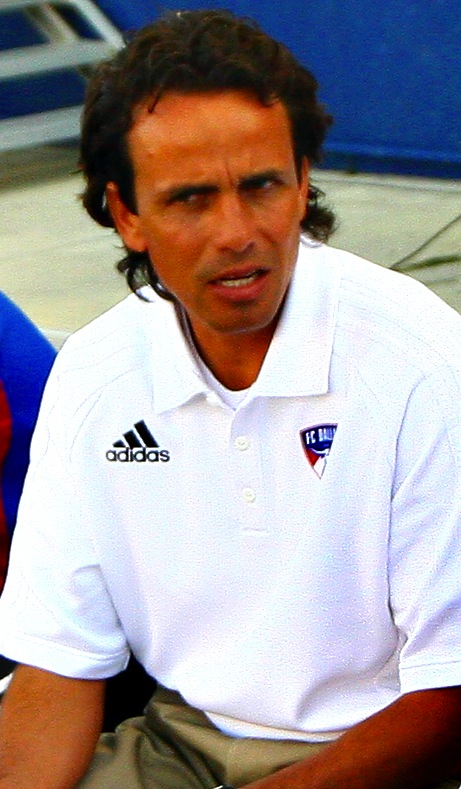
After winning the award for the 2016 season, Óscar Pareja became the first coach from Latin America to with the award.

**Bold**	Team won MLS Cup for that season
†	Elected to the National Soccer Hall of Fame

Season	Coach	Team
1996	(Netherlands) Thomas Rongen	Tampa Bay Mutiny
1997	(United States) Bruce Arena †	**D.C. United**
1998	(United States) Bob Bradley †	**Chicago Fire**
1999	(United States) Sigi Schmid †	Los Angeles Galaxy
2000	(United States) Bob Gansler	**Kansas City Wizards**
2001	(Canada) Frank Yallop	**San Jose Earthquakes**
2002	(Scotland) Steve Nicol	New England Revolution
2003	(United States) Dave Sarachan	Chicago Fire
2004	(United States) Greg Andrulis	Columbus Crew
2005	(United States) Dominic Kinnear	San Jose Earthquakes
2006	(United States) Bob Bradley † (2)	Chivas USA
2007	(United States) Preki	Chivas USA
2008	(United States) Sigi Schmid † (2)	**Columbus Crew**
2009	(United States) Bruce Arena † (2)	Los Angeles Galaxy
2010	(United States) Schellas Hyndman	FC Dallas
2011	(United States) Bruce Arena † (3)	**Los Angeles Galaxy**
2012	(Canada) Frank Yallop (2)	San Jose Earthquakes
2013	(United States) Caleb Porter	Portland Timbers
2014	(United States) Ben Olsen	D.C. United
2015	(United States) Jesse Marsch	New York Red Bulls
2016	(Colombia) Óscar Pareja	FC Dallas
2017	(United States) Greg Vanney	**Toronto FC**
2018	(Argentina) Gerardo Martino	**Atlanta United FC**
2019	(United States) Bob Bradley † (3)	Los Angeles FC
2020	(United States) Jim Curtin	Philadelphia Union
2021	(United States) Bruce Arena † (4)	New England Revolution
2022	(United States) Jim Curtin (2)	Philadelphia Union
2023	(United States) Pat Noonan	FC Cincinnati
2024	(France) Wilfried Nancy	Columbus Crew
2025	(South Africa) Bradley Carnell	Philadelphia Union

== Wins by team ==
Club	Wins
Columbus Crew	3
LA Galaxy	3
Philadelphia Union	3
San Jose Earthquakes	3
Chicago Fire FC	2
Chivas USA	2
D.C. United	2
FC Dallas	2
New England Revolution	2
Atlanta United FC	1
Kansas City Wizards/Sporting KC	1
Los Angeles FC	1
New York Red Bulls	1
Portland Timbers	1
Tampa Bay Mutiny	1
Toronto FC	1
FC Cincinnati	1

== Wins by nationality ==
Nationality	Wins
United States	22
Canada	2
Argentina	1
Colombia	1
Netherlands	1
Scotland	1
France	1
South Africa	1

== See also ==
- List of Major League Soccer coaches
