= Luchi Gonzalez =

American soccer player and coach

Personal information
- Birth name: Luis Aquilino Gonzalez
- Date of birth: July 14, 1980 (age 46)
- Place of birth: Hialeah, Florida, United States
- Height: 5 ft 8 in (1.73 m)
- Position: Forward

College career
Years	Team	Apps	(Gls)
1998–2001	SMU Mustangs	?	(48)

Senior career*
Years	Team	Apps	(Gls)
2002	San Jose Earthquakes	8	(0)
2003	Bodens BK	?	(8)
2004	Sporting Cristal	?	(5)
2005–2006	Colorado Rapids	22	(2)
2007	Miami FC	26	(4)
2008	Minnesota Thunder	29	(2)

International career^{‡}
1997	United States U17	3	(0)

Managerial career
- 2012–2018: FC Dallas (academy director)
- 2018–2021: FC Dallas
- 2021–2022: United States (assistant)
- 2023–2024: San Jose Earthquakes
- * Club domestic league appearances and goals as of July 10, 2019 ‡ National team caps and goals as of July 10, 2019

Luis Aquilino Gonzalez (born July 14, 1980) is an American-Peruvian soccer coach and former player who was recently the head coach of San Jose Earthquakes in MLS.

== Youth and college ==
Gonzalez was born in Hialeah, Florida, to a Peruvian father and an American mother.

Gonzalez represented the United States U17s at the 1997 FIFA U-17 World Championship making 3 appearances in their group stage exit. He played four years of college soccer at Southern Methodist University, emerging in 2001, his senior season, to win the Hermann Trophy as college soccer's best player. He had 128 points during his career, including 48 goals and 32 assists.

== Playing career ==
Upon graduating, Gonzalez was drafted 6th overall in the 2002 MLS SuperDraft by the San Jose Earthquakes. Gonzalez failed to make a mark with the Earthquakes, however, playing only 47 minutes in his rookie season. In the offseason he was acquired by the Columbus Crew and made the roster, but could not agree to a deal.

He left the United States for Sweden, where he signed with second-division club Bodens BK. Gonzalez scored 8 goals and had 4 assists in his first season in Europe; along with Leighton O'Brien, Gonzalez was one of the most respected players in the squad. He left Boden in late October 2003. Gonzalez joined Peruvian Sporting Cristal, where he was acquired to be a backup striker. Gonzalez appeared in the prestigious Copa Libertadores tournament, playing against the likes of Boca Juniors during his time.

Gonzalez came back to MLS in 2005. He signed with the Colorado Rapids, but following the 2006 season he was waived. He signed for Miami FC in 2007.

== Coaching career ==
In December 2018, Gonzalez was named Head Coach of FC Dallas in MLS, earning a promotion from his academy director role. Gonzalez has adopted a style of play dubbed 'Luchi Ball' by fans, emphasizing possession and counter-pressing.

Gonzalez coached Dallas to playoff appearances in 2019 and 2020. On September 19, 2021, he was fired by FC Dallas after missing the playoffs.

On December 4, 2021, Gonzalez was appointed assistant coach of the United States men's national soccer team.

On August 17, 2022, it was announced that Gonzalez would take over as head coach of the San Jose Earthquakes prior to the start of the 2023 Major League Soccer season. He would officially join the club following the conclusion of the 2022 FIFA World Cup.

Gonzalez qualified his team to the playoffs in his first season, but the Earthquakes were eliminated by Sporting Kansas City on penalties in the first edition of the Wild-card round as part of the new playoff format. However, in 2024, he was only able to coach his team to three wins in their first 19 matches and a placement at the bottom of the league table, and Gonzalez was fired on June 24.

== Coaching statistics ==
As of match played June 22, 2024

Coaching record by team and tenure
Team	From	To	Record							
Team	From	To	G	W	D	L	GF	GA	GD	Win %
FC Dallas	December 16, 2018	September 19, 2021	87	29	26	32	129	121	+8	33.33
San Jose Earthquakes	January 1, 2023	June 24, 2024	59	14	17	28	72	102	−30	23.73
Total			146	43	43	60	201	223	−22	29.45

== See also ==
- List of MLS coaches
