= Caleb Porter =

American soccer coach (born 1975)

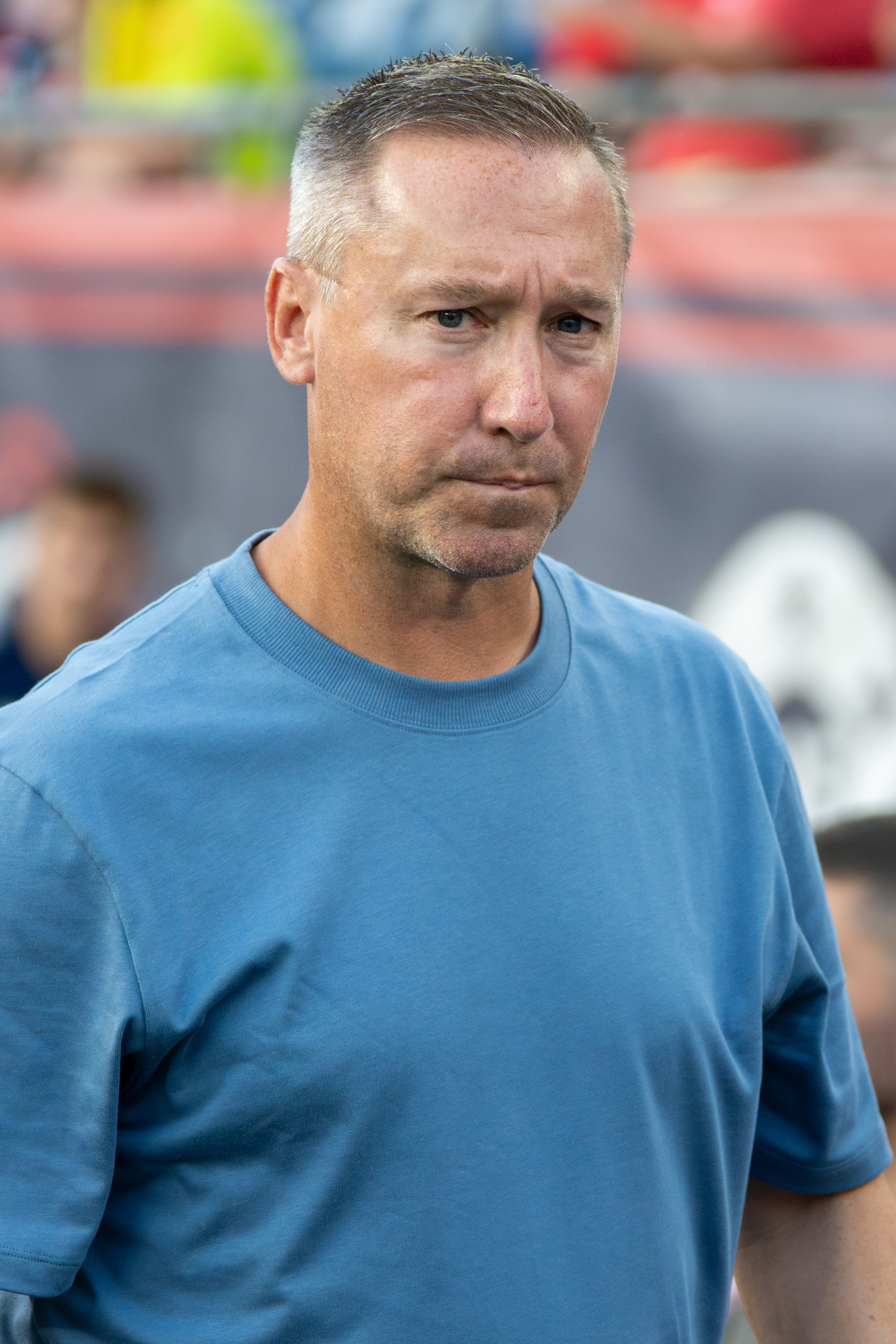
- Porter in 2025

Personal information
- Date of birth: February 18, 1975 (age 51)
- Place of birth: Tacoma, Washington, United States
- Height: 5 ft 9 in (1.75 m)
- Position: Midfielder

Youth career
- 1994–1997: Indiana Hoosiers

Senior career*
Years	Team	Apps	(Gls)
1998–1999	San Jose Clash	4	(0)
1999	→ Sacramento Geckos (loan)	2	(0)
1999–2000	Tampa Bay Mutiny	7	(0)

Managerial career
- 2000–2005: Indiana Hoosiers (assistant)
- 2006–2012: Akron Zips
- 2011–2012: United States U23
- 2013–2017: Portland Timbers
- 2019–2022: Columbus Crew
- 2023–2025: New England Revolution
- * Club domestic league appearances and goals

Caleb Porter (born February 18, 1975) is an American soccer coach who was most recently the head coach of Major League Soccer club New England Revolution. He was previously head coach of the Portland Timbers from 2013 until 2017. He won MLS Cup in 2015 with Portland and 2020 with Columbus. In addition to MLS, he coached the United States U-23 team in 2011–12, and the University of Akron men's team from 2006 to 2012, winning the NCAA title in 2010.

A former midfielder, he played college soccer for Indiana University before his short professional career in Major League Soccer and the United Soccer League was ended by persistent knee injuries.

== Player ==
Porter attended Indiana University where he played on the men's soccer team from 1994 to 1997 as defensive center midfielder. Lifetime Mentor Jerry Yeagley labelled his players as Piano Players or Piano Carriers. Caleb was a Piano Carrier. He was one of only two all time Indiana Hoosers to be Captain for three years of his team. He graduated in 1997 with a Bachelor's degree in sports management. In February 1998, the San Jose Clash selected Porter with the 3rd round (27th overall) in the 1998 MLS College Draft. He did not join the Clash until 1999 but his tenure there was short - he made just four appearances and, in his one start, was ejected in the 32nd minute. Following that performance, the Clash sent him on loan to the Sacramento Geckos of the A-League before waiving him in June. He quickly returned to MLS after being signed by the Tampa Bay Mutiny in July. He suffered from several knee injuries and had arthroscopic surgery on both knees during the off-season before retiring on June 30, 2000. In 1997, Porter was a member of the U.S. soccer team which took the bronze medal at the 1997 World University Games.

== College coach ==
In 2000, Porter returned to Indiana University as an assistant soccer coach. While at Indiana as Assistant Coach, the Hoosers won two National Championships. After Ken Lolla left the University of Akron in December 2005, the Zips hired Porter as head soccer coach. After taking the Zips to two consecutive Mid-American Conference titles, and being named the 2007 MAC Coach of the Year, Porter signed a two-year contract extension in June 2008.

Following Akron's near-perfect season of 2009, Porter was rumored to be in talks with Major League Soccer club D.C. United about their vacant head coaching position. However, the University of Akron and Porter agreed on terms of a new contract, keeping him in Akron for the next five years.

Under Porter, the 2010 Akron squad captured the NCAA Men's Division I Soccer Championship, defeating the Louisville Cardinals, 1–0.

== National U-23 team coach ==
Porter was named the head coach of the U.S. Under-23 Men's National Team on October 20, 2011, while retaining his duties as coach of the Akron Zips. His first task was attempting to guide the U-23 team to a successful qualifying run in March 2012 for the 2012 Olympic Games in London; however, following a 2–0 loss to Canada and a 3–3 draw with El Salvador, the Americans were eliminated.

== Professional coach ==
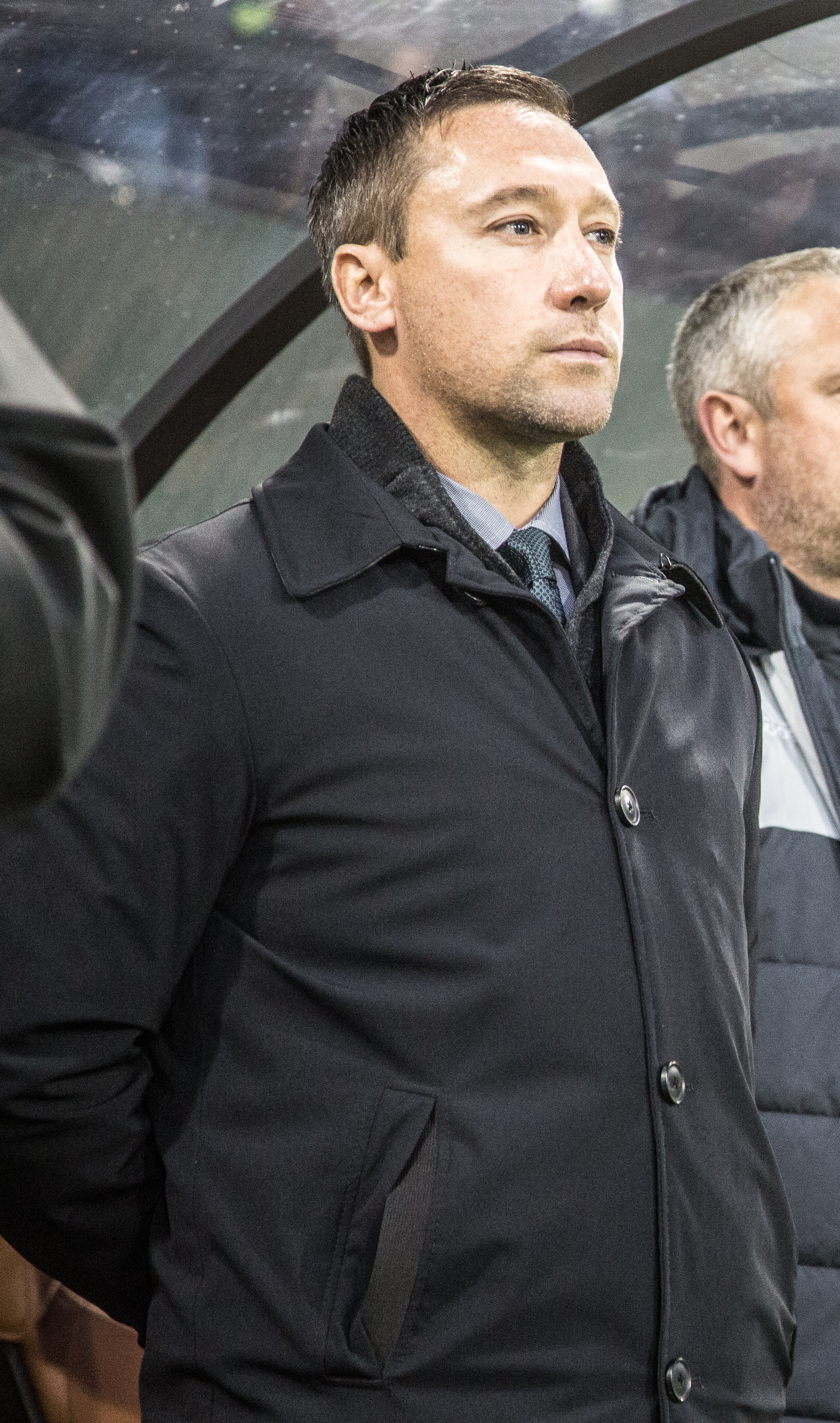
Porter as Portland Timbers head coach in 2015.

On August 29, 2012, it was announced that he would become the head coach of MLS club Portland Timbers after the conclusion of the 2012 NCAA season.

Porter was named the 2013 MLS Coach of the Year after leading Portland to a 14–5–15 (57 pts) record, finishing the regular season in first place in the Western Conference and with the third-best record in the league – two points shy of MLS Supporters' Shield-winners New York Red Bulls. In 2013, the Timbers set new single-season club marks in points, wins, goals (54), goal differential (+21), shutouts (15) and fewest goals allowed (33). Porter was awarded the 2013 Slats Gill Sportsperson of the Year Award from the Oregon Sports Awards.

In the 2014 MLS All-Star Game, Porter coached the MLS All-Star team to a 2–1 victory against a Pep Guardiola-led Bayern Munich.

Helping guide the Timbers to the MLS Western Conference Championship twice in three seasons (2013–2015), Porter compiled one of the league's top winning percentages among active MLS head coaches (41 wins - 25 losses – 36 draws, .578). The 25 career losses in his first 100 career games as an MLS head coach ranks tied for the fewest losses with San Jose's Dominic Kinnear among all MLS coaches who have reached 100 or more games in the league. Under Porter's guidance, the Timbers made Providence Park one of the toughest places to play in the league, registering a regular-season mark of 24–7–20 at Providence Park over the three seasons 2013–15.

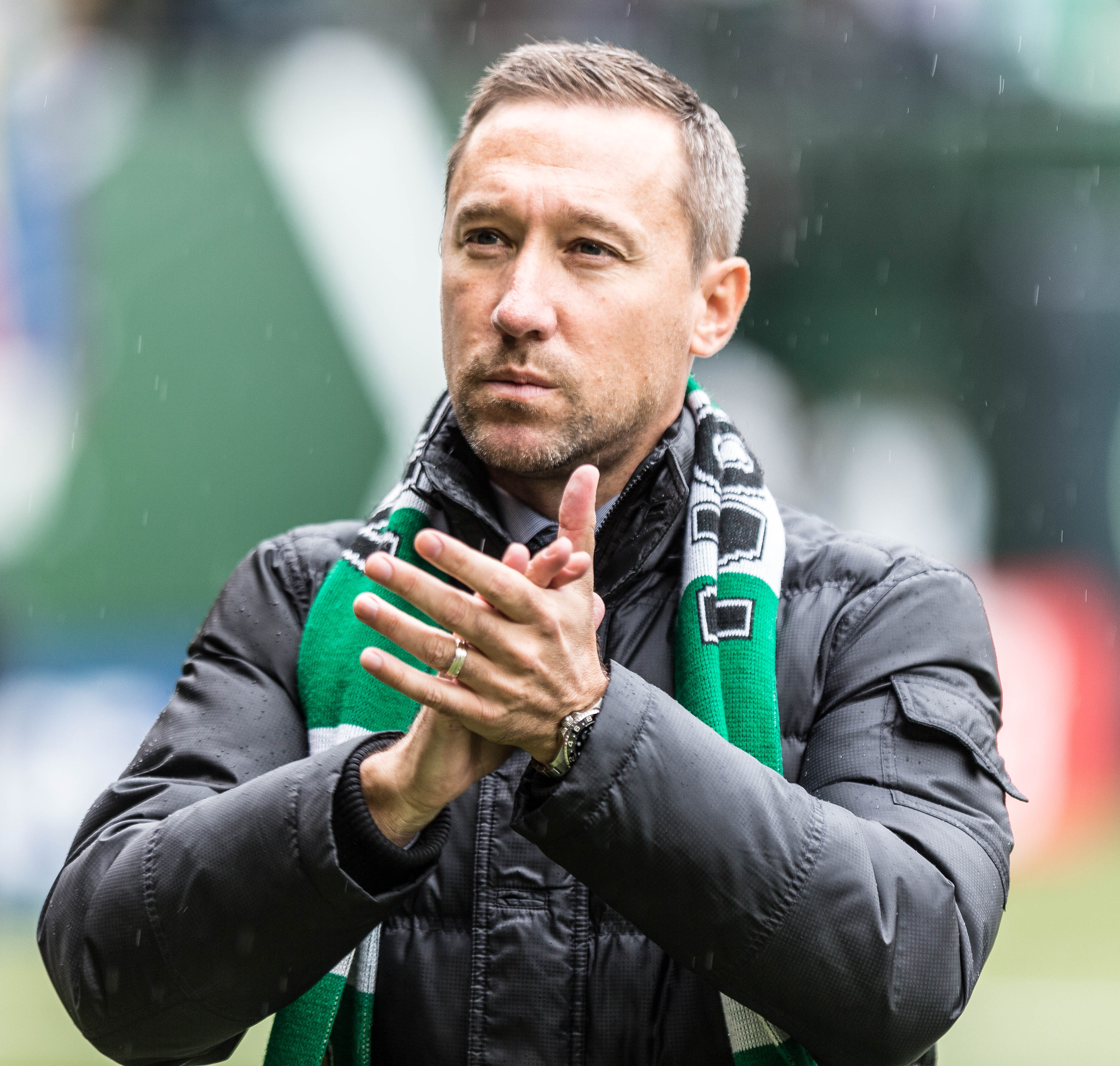
Porter in 2016

In 2015, the Timbers once again reached the MLS Cup Playoffs, setting a new single-season club record in wins (15), while leading the league with 13 shutouts. Porter led the Timbers to their first MLS Cup final, which they won, 2–1, against Columbus Crew SC. From 2013 to 2015, Porter helped guide the Timbers to the fourth-most points (159) among all MLS clubs, behind only the New York Red Bulls (169), Seattle Sounders FC (167) and LA Galaxy (165).

On January 27, 2016, Porter signed a long-term contract extension with the Timbers. On November 16, 2017, Porter and the Timbers mutually agreed to separate.

On January 4, 2019, Columbus Crew announced Porter as their new head coach, to replace Gregg Berhalter, who had left to become the head coach of the United States men's national soccer team. Porter's appointment was made simultaneously with the announcement of Tim Bezbatchenko as Crew SC's new president.

Porter helped lead Columbus to victory in MLS Cup 2020, making him one of only three coaches ever to win MLS Cup with different teams. However he failed to lead the Crew to the playoffs in any other season. On October 10, 2022, after missing consecutive post-seasons — including a loss on the final day of the 2022 season — Porter was fired as Crew head coach.

On December 19, 2023, the New England Revolution announced that it had appointed Porter as its head coach, filling the void left by Bruce Arena several months prior. In 2024, Porter led New England to a 9-21-4 (W-L-D) record in the regular season, second-worst in the Eastern Conference. On September 15, 2025, Porter was dismissed from his role as head coach.

== Coaching statistics ==
=== College ===
Record table
Season	Team	Overall	Conference	Standing	Postseason
Akron Zips (Mid-American Conference) (2006–2012)
2006	Akron	14–6–1	4–0–1	1st	
2007	Akron	15–4–2	5–0–1	1st	NCAA 2nd Round
2008	Akron	17–2–4	6–0–0	1st	NCAA 3rd Round
2009	Akron	23–1–1	6–0–0	1st	NCAA Final
2010	Akron	22–1–2	6–0–0	1st	NCAA Champions
2011	Akron	15–4–4	6–0–0	1st	NCAA 3rd Round
2012	Akron	18–1–3	6–0–0	1st	NCAA 3rd Round
Total:		119–18–17			
National champion Postseason invitational champion Conference regular season champion Conference regular season and conference tournament champion Division regular season champion Division regular season and conference tournament champion Conference tournament champion

=== Professional ===
As of match played 13 September 2025

Coaching record by team and tenure
Team	Nat	From	To	Record							
Team	Nat	From	To	G	W	D	L	GF	GA	GD	Win %
Portland Timbers	(United States)	January 8, 2013	November 17, 2017	202	85	57	60	329	271	+58	42.08
Columbus Crew	(United States)	January 4, 2019	October 10, 2022	138	53	39	46	190	167	+23	38.41
New England Revolution	(United States)	December 19, 2023	September 15, 2025	75	22	15	38	93	133	−40	29.33
Total				415	160	111	144	612	571	+41	38.55

== Honors ==
=== Coaching ===
Portland Timbers

- MLS Cup: 2015
- Western Conference (playoffs): 2015
- Western Conference (regular season): 2013, 2017

Columbus Crew SC

- MLS Cup: 2020
- Eastern Conference (playoffs): 2020
- Campeones Cup: 2021

=== Individual ===
- MLS Coach of the Year: 2013

== See also ==
- List of Major League Soccer coaches
