= MLS Cup 2020 =

2020 edition of the MLS Cup

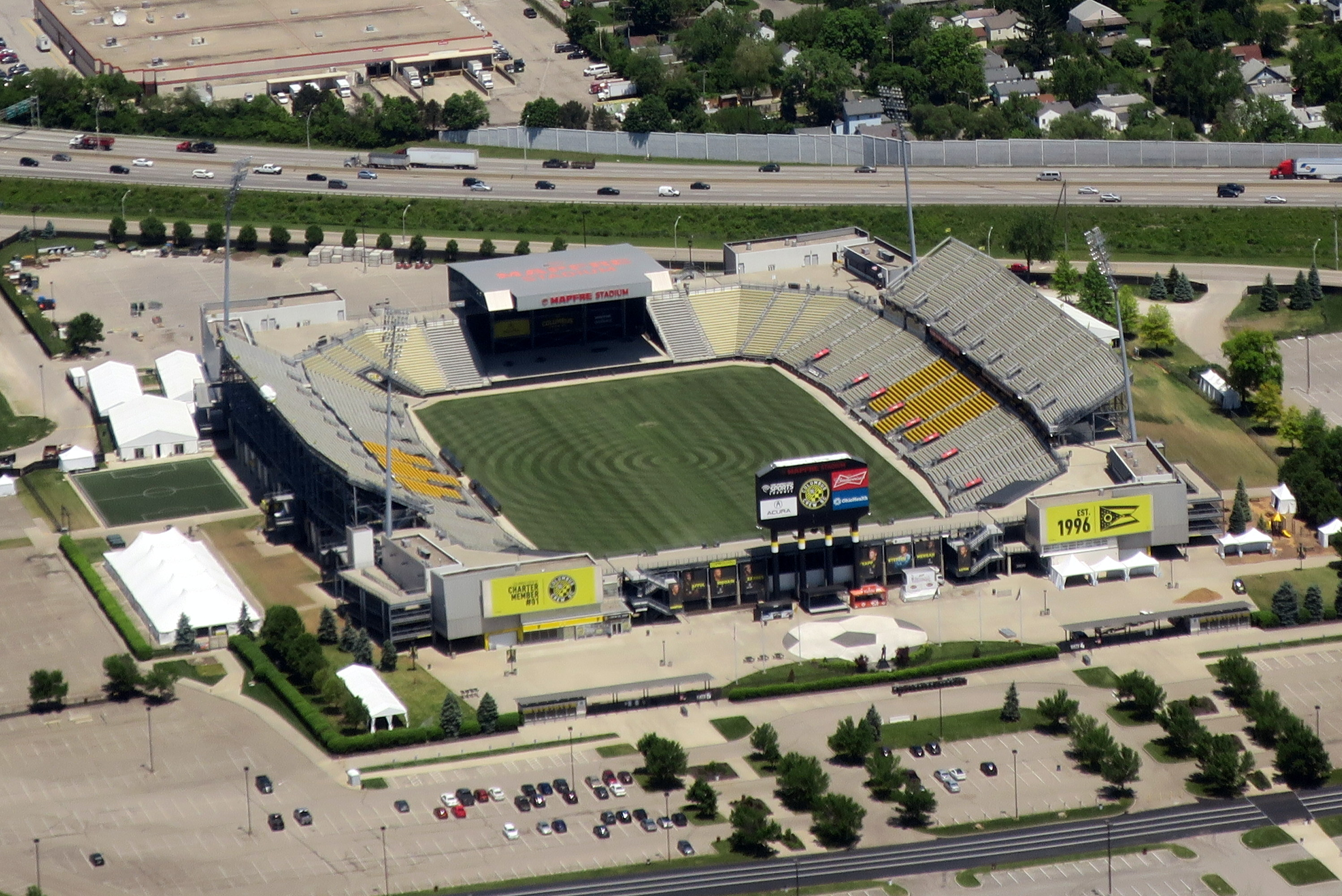
- Aerial view of Mapfre Stadium, the host venue of MLS Cup 2020
- Event: MLS Cup
Columbus Crew SC	Seattle Sounders FC
3	0
- Date: December 12, 2020
- Venue: Mapfre Stadium, Columbus, Ohio, U.S.
- MLS Cup MVP: Lucas Zelarayán (Columbus Crew SC)
- Referee: Jair Marrufo
- Attendance: 1,500
- Weather: Cloudy, 48 °F (9 °C)

MLS Cup 2020 was the 25th edition of the MLS Cup, the championship match of Major League Soccer (MLS). It was played at Mapfre Stadium in Columbus, Ohio, United States. The match was originally set to take place on November 7, 2020, but was postponed to December 12 due to the COVID-19 pandemic and the adjusted MLS season schedule. The match was contested by Columbus Crew SC and Seattle Sounders FC, the defending champions from MLS Cup 2019.

A limited crowd of 1,500 spectators was permitted to attend the match; it was the final playoff match played at Mapfre Stadium, which was replaced by a new stadium in 2021. Both teams had previously won the MLS Cup and were seeded to host their playoffs matches at their respective home stadiums.

The Crew won 3–0 to secure their second MLS Cup championship, scoring twice in the first half and preventing a Sounders comeback in the second half. Lucas Zelarayán scored two goals and provided an assist to Derrick Etienne; he was later named the most valuable player. Columbus manager Caleb Porter became the third coach to win the MLS Cup with different teams, repeating his feat from MLS Cup 2015, where the Portland Timbers defeated the Crew at Mapfre Stadium.

== Road to the final ==
The MLS Cup is the post-season championship of Major League Soccer (MLS), a professional club soccer league in the United States and Canada. The 2020 season was the 25th in MLS history, and was contested by 26 teams organized into the Eastern and Western conferences. The 2020 regular season began on February 29, 2020, and was originally scheduled to conclude on October 4, 2020. The league was divided into two conferences of 13 teams, with each scheduled to play a 34-game schedule with 17 each of home and away matches. Each team was to play their intra-conference opponents twice—once home and once away for a total of 24 matches—and one match against 10 of the members of the opposite conference. The 2020 season was to be the first MLS season in which each team did not play every other team at least once.

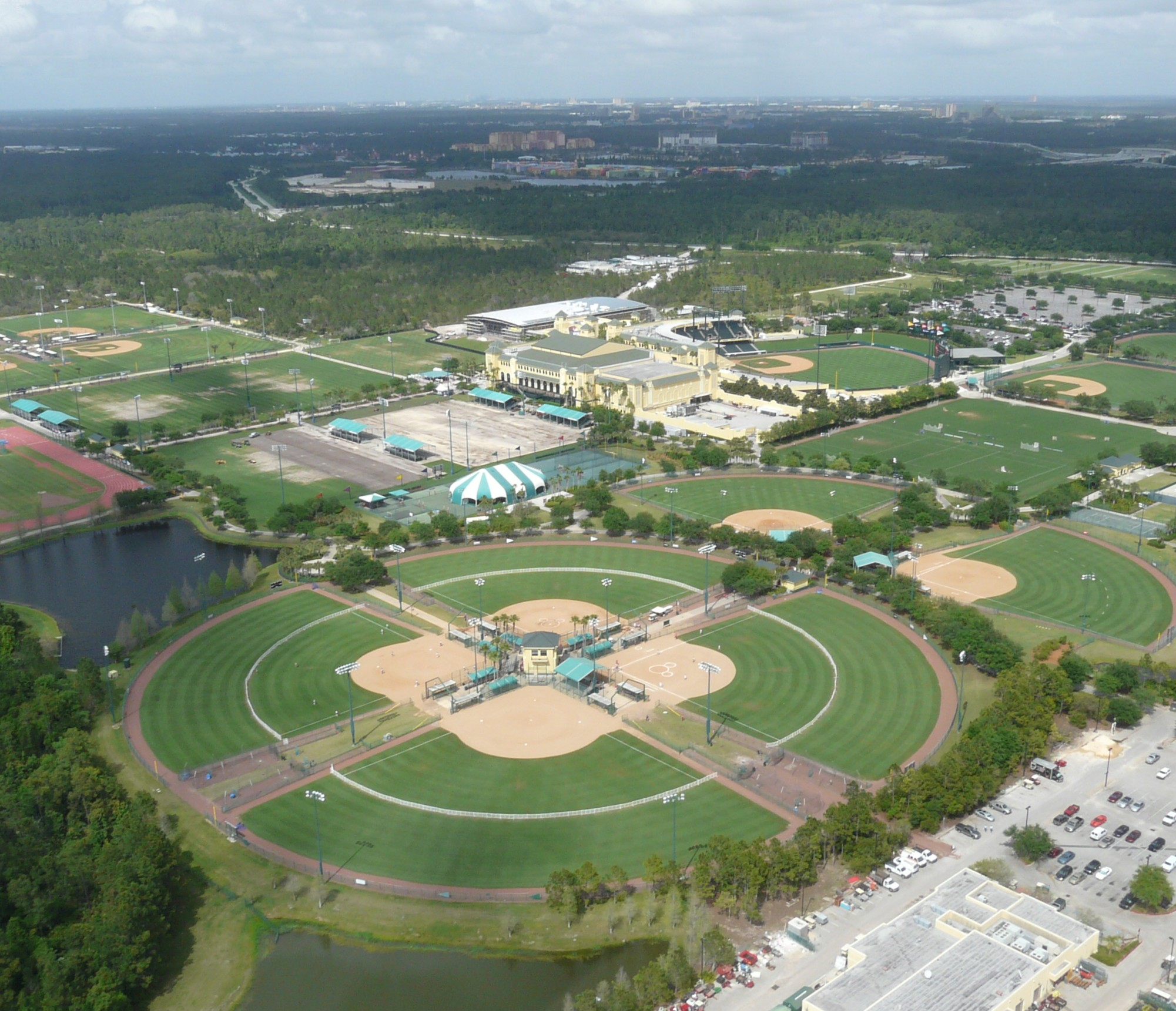
The season resumed at the ESPN Wide World of Sports Complex (pictured); both teams were eliminated in the Round of 16.

Due to the outbreak of the COVID-19 pandemic, which caused several matches to be cancelled, MLS suspended all play on March 12—the first total interruption of league play since the September 11 attacks in 2001. The league resumed play with the MLS is Back Tournament, a special tournament of regular season matches played at the ESPN Wide World of Sports Complex at Walt Disney World in Bay Lake, Florida, with 24 teams participating following the withdrawal of FC Dallas and Nashville SC. The tournament, which included isolation of personnel and frequent COVID-19 testing, was organized into a group stage of three matches and a knockout bracket for the top 16 teams. It was played from July 8 to August 11 and concluded with the Portland Timbers defeating Orlando City SC.

MLS announced that the regular season would resume in home markets on August 12 with all teams playing a total of 23 matches over the course of several phases. The first phase comprised six matches between conference opponents for U.S. clubs, while FC Dallas and Nashville SC (who were moved to the Eastern Conference) played each other an additional three times to make up for missed matches from the MLS is Back Tournament. The three Canadian clubs played six matches between themselves, as they were unable to play in the United States due to cross-border travel restrictions, including a mandatory 14-day quarantine. The second phase began September 18 with clubs continuing to play intra-conference matches within a smaller geographic bubble; the three Canadian clubs played their home matches from temporary venues in the U.S. The regular season concluded with Decision Day on November 8 and conference standings for the playoffs were determined by calculating points per game due to cancellations of matches late in the season, including an eight-match deficit for the Colorado Rapids after a COVID-19 outbreak.

The MLS Cup Playoffs was contested using the single-elimination format adopted in 2019 by an expanded field of 18 teams—ten from the East and eight from the West. It began on November 20 with a play-in round for the four lowest seeds in the East and continued for four rounds hosted by the team with higher ranking as determined by points per game. A scheduled international break in the FIFA International Match Calendar between Decision Day and the first playoff matches forced clubs to play without some players due to quarantine rules, despite league-funded charter flights to circumvent it. The MLS Cup final was scheduled for December 12, its latest-ever staging.

The finalists, Columbus Crew SC and Seattle Sounders FC, played each other in the 2010 U.S. Open Cup Final, which was won 2–1 by Seattle. The two teams had each previously won the MLS Cup, with the Crew defeating the New York Red Bulls in the 2008 final and losing in 2015 to the Portland Timbers. The Sounders were appearing in their fourth MLS Cup final in five years, having played Toronto FC in their three previous finals—winning in 2016 and 2019 and losing in 2017. The Sounders and Crew played each other once in the 2020 regular season, on March 7 in Seattle, which finished in a 1–1 draw.

=== Columbus Crew SC ===
The Columbus Crew underwent a major reorganization in January 2019, when the club's ownership was transferred from Anthony Precourt (who was awarded the rights to Austin FC by the league) to the Haslam and Edwards families. The Crew also announced the hiring of former Portland manager Caleb Porter and former Toronto FC team president Tim Bezbatchenko to rebuild the team ahead of the opening of a new stadium in 2021. The team missed the 2019 playoffs, finishing 10th in the Eastern Conference, but Porter and Bezbatchenko had begun rebuilding the roster with several acquisitions during the summer transfer window, including midfielders Luis Díaz and Youness Mokhtar.

The club declined options on several key players, including star midfielder Federico Higuaín and former captain Wil Trapp, and was left with 13 empty roster positions to fill with new offseason signings. Columbus acquired midfielder Darlington Nagbe through a trade from Atlanta United FC and signed Lucas Zelarayán from UANL Tigres of Liga MX for a club-record $7 million transfer fee. Nagbe and Zelarayán were placed at the center of Porter's preferred 4–2–3–1 formation and went on to contribute to the team's improved 2020 performance despite injury issues.

The Crew opened their season with a 1–0 win against New York City FC at home, with Zelarayán scoring on his league debut. Following a 1–1 draw with the Sounders in Seattle, the MLS season was suspended due to the COVID-19 pandemic. During the suspension, the club sent at-home workout plans and nutrition advice to its players, who were also monitored through video conferencing during training exercises. Players returned to the Crew's training facility in on May 13 for individual workouts, which was replaced by group training on June 4 and full-team sessions on June 12.

Columbus was drawn into Group E at the MLS is Back Tournament alongside Atlanta United FC, in-state rivals FC Cincinnati, and the New York Red Bulls. The Crew topped Group E with three victories, all shutouts, and advanced to face Minnesota United FC in the Round of 16. Minnesota won 5–3 in a penalty shootout after a 1–1 draw, with one shot from the Crew saved by goalkeeper Tyler Miller.

The Crew resumed the regular season atop the Eastern Conference and remained there through late September. The team, playing mostly at home, went on a six-match unbeaten streak but lost Nagbe and Zelarayán to multi-week injuries. The unbeaten streak was snapped by a 3–1 loss to Toronto, the first of several away matches that saw Columbus win only three of their remaining ten matches. The Crew finished third in the Eastern Conference, having tied Orlando City SC on points but bumped ahead by the wins tiebreaker, and were winless in away matches; the team went on to play the entire playoffs at home due to their seeding and regained Nagbe and Zelarayan, the latter of whom was named MLS Newcomer of the Year.

Columbus played New York Red Bulls in the first round of the playoffs following a week-long break after the regular season ended. The Crew conceded a 23rd-minute goal to the Red Bulls, but responded with three goals from Pedro Santos, Nagbe, and Gyasi Zardes to win 3–2. Ahead of their Conference Semifinals fixture against expansion side Nashville SC, the team lost seven players to positive COVID-19 tests, including starting goalkeeper Eloy Room and midfielder Derrick Etienne. The semifinal match, the last of the season to be played behind closed doors, remained scoreless until extra time despite several chances from Nashville. Zardes assisted on the opening goal, finished by Pedro Santos in the 99th minute, and scored himself four minutes later to secure a 2–0 victory.

The Crew faced the eighth-seeded New England Revolution in the Eastern Conference Final with 1,500 fans in attendance at Mapfre Stadium. Columbus advanced to their third MLS Cup final with a 1–0 win against New England, with the lone goal scored in the 59th minute by midfielder Artur after controlling the majority of shots but failing to create scoring chances.

=== Seattle Sounders FC ===
The Sounders won their second MLS Cup in 2019 by defeating Toronto 3–1 at CenturyLink Field in Seattle. The club retained most of their roster under head coach Brian Schmetzer, but lost midfielder Víctor Rodríguez and defenders Román Torres, Kim Kee-hee, and Brad Smith during the offseason. In January 2020, Seattle signed central midfielder João Paulo to a Designated Player contract and also acquired defenders Yeimar Gómez Andrade and Shane O'Neill to fill open positions in the backline. After a short preseason, the club played in the 2020 CONCACAF Champions League, where they were eliminated in the Round of 16 by Honduran champions C.D. Olimpia, who won in a penalty shootout following a 4–4 draw on aggregate.

Seattle opened the regular season in March with two matches at home played in front of crowds despite the severe COVID-19 outbreak in Washington state and a state of emergency declared by Governor Jay Inslee. The Sounders won 2–1 against the Chicago Fire in the first match as striker Jordan Morris scored twice in the second half to overcome an earlier deficit. The following week, in front of the smallest attendance for a home match since 2009, the team drew 1–1 with the Columbus Crew. The club suspended all operations until further notice on March 12, days before a planned away fixture with the Houston Dynamo; a home match against FC Dallas on March 21 had already been postponed due to the state government's ban on large events amid the pandemic.

The club organized virtual training sessions through video conferencing and nutrition plans to maintain fitness during the suspension, which was lifted for socially distant training at Starfire Sports on May 18 with approval from the state government. The Sounders were seeded during the MLS is Back Tournament draw and placed in Group B alongside Vancouver Whitecaps FC, the San Jose Earthquakes, and FC Dallas, who later withdrew due to a COVID-19 outbreak at the club. They finished second in Group B behind San Jose with a 1–1–1 record and a goal difference of +2. Seattle went on to be eliminated in the Round of 16 by Los Angeles FC, losing 4–1 due to several defensive mistakes.

The Sounders returned to regular season play with a 3–0 victory against the Timbers in Portland that brought them to second place in the West, which was followed by the players cancelling an away match against the LA Galaxy by joining a multi-team boycott to protest racial injustice. The team returned to play their first home match of the restarted regular season on August 30, defeating Los Angeles FC 3–1, followed two days later by an away match against Real Salt Lake that ended in a 2–2 draw. The Sounders played their next three matches at home, losing 2–1 to the Timbers, but winning 7–1 against San Jose (setting a franchise record for goals scored) and 3–0 against Los Angeles FC to move to first in the Western Conference.

Following a loss to the Timbers, Seattle went on a three-match winning streak to continue their lead in the West and contend for the Supporters' Shield title. Two defenders who left during the offseason, Brad Smith and Román Torres, returned to the club by early October to provide lineup flexibility ahead of the push to the playoffs, which came amid international call-ups for several starting players. A match on October 14 against the Colorado Rapids was postponed and later cancelled due to their COVID-19 outbreak; the Sounders were also without star forward Raúl Ruidíaz for two matches after he tested positive for COVID-19 while playing for the Peru national team. Seattle played to draws against San Jose and Portland before defeating the Vancouver Whitecaps to clinch their twelfth consecutive playoff berth. The Sounders fell to second in the West after losing 3–1 to the Colorado Rapids and tying 1–1 with the LA Galaxy, but won their Decision Day fixture against San Jose.

The Sounders opened their playoffs campaign at home against seventh-place Los Angeles FC in a rematch of the previous Western Conference Final. While Seattle were expected to play with a full-strength squad, LAFC were missing several starting players who tested positive for COVID-19, among them MLS top goalscorer Diego Rossi and assists leader Brian Rodríguez. The home side won 3–1, with Ruidíaz scoring once and recording two assists as the team controlled possession against LAFC, who were unable to equalize after Carlos Vela missed an early penalty kick. Seattle hosted the Conference Semifinals against FC Dallas, who had upset Portland as the sixth seed, but were without midfielder Gustav Svensson due to quarantine protocols following an international call-up. The match ended in a 1–0 victory for the Sounders, with the lone goal scored by defender Shane O'Neill, who headed in a corner kick in the 49th minute amid a defensive stalemate between the two teams.

Seattle hosted the Western Conference Final against Minnesota United FC, who had upset conference-leading Sporting Kansas City as the fourth seed with a 3–0 away victory. Minnesota led 2–0 early in the second half with a free kick scored by Emanuel Reynoso in the 27th minute and a header from Bakaye Dibassy in the 67th minute. The Sounders scored three goals in the final 18 minutes of the match to earn a 3–2 comeback victory, continuing a 15-match home unbeaten streak in the playoffs. Will Bruin scored two minutes after entering the match in the 73rd minute and was followed by an equalizer from Raúl Ruidíaz in the 89th minute, who shot off a rebound after a corner kick was deflected to him. Midfielder Gustav Svensson, who had returned from a COVID quarantine, scored the winning goal with a header in the third minute of stoppage time.

=== Summary of results ===
Note: In all results below, the score of the finalist is given first (H: home; A: away).

Columbus Crew SC		Round	Seattle Sounders FC	
3rd place in Eastern Conference: Pos / Team / Pld / Pts / PPG; 1 / Philadelphia Union / 23 / 47 / 2.04; 2 / Toronto FC / 23 / 44 / 1.91; 3 / Columbus Crew SC (C) / 23 / 41 / 1.78; 4 / Orlando City SC / 23 / 41 / 1.78; 5 / New York City FC / 23 / 39 / 1.70; 6 / New York Red Bulls / 23 / 32 / 1.39; 7 / Nashville SC / 23 / 32 / 1.39; 8 / New England Revolution / 23 / 32 / 1.39; Source: MLS (C) Champions Qualified for playoffs Qualified for CONCACAF Champions League		Regular season	2nd place in Western Conference: Pos / Team / Pld / Pts / PPG; 1 / Sporting Kansas City / 21 / 39 / 1.86; 2 / Seattle Sounders FC / 22 / 39 / 1.77; 3 / Portland Timbers / 23 / 39 / 1.70; 4 / Minnesota United FC / 21 / 34 / 1.62; 5 / Colorado Rapids / 18 / 28 / 1.56; 6 / FC Dallas / 22 / 34 / 1.55; 7 / Los Angeles FC / 22 / 32 / 1.45; 8 / San Jose Earthquakes / 23 / 30 / 1.30; Source: MLS Qualified for playoffs Qualified for CONCACAF Champions League	
Opponent	Score	MLS Cup Playoffs	Opponent	Score
New York Red Bulls	3–2 (H)	First round	Los Angeles FC	3–1 (H)
Nashville SC	2–0 (a.e.t.) (H)	Conference Semifinals	FC Dallas	1–0 (H)
New England Revolution	1–0 (H)	Conference Finals	Minnesota United FC	3–2 (H)

== Venue ==
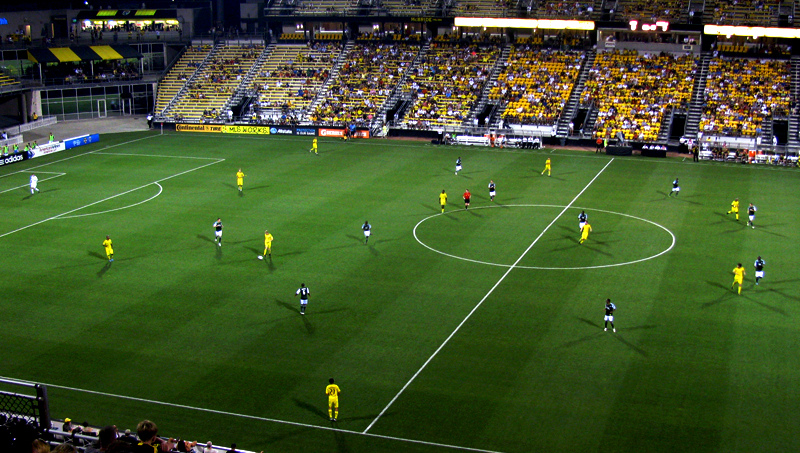
Mapfre Stadium hosted the final.

The MLS Cup final was played at Mapfre Stadium, the home venue of the Columbus Crew, who finished ahead of the Seattle Sounders on points per game. It opened in 1999 as the first soccer-specific stadium to be built for a MLS team and was replaced during the 2021 season by the new Lower.com Field in the Arena District. Mapfre Stadium previously hosted the MLS Cup in 2001 and 2015. Due to the COVID-19 pandemic, the 20,000-seat venue was limited to 1,500 spectators in distanced seating to comply with local regulations. Earlier in the season, MLS officials had also prepared contingency plans to move the MLS Cup final to a neutral venue, such as Exploria Stadium in Orlando, Florida, in the event that a host market restricted all sporting activities. A statewide COVID-19 curfew issued on December 10 by Ohio governor Mike DeWine exempted the match and other sporting events held in large outdoor venues.

== Broadcasting ==
The match was broadcast in English by Fox in the United States and TSN in Canada. UniMás and Univision Deportes carried the Spanish broadcast in the United States, while TVA Sports carried the French broadcast in Canada. The match was also broadcast in 190 countries by several international networks, including ESPN Latin America, BeIN Sports, and Abu Dhabi Sports. The MLS Cup final was watched by 1.071 million spectators on Fox, an increase of 30 percent from 2019, and 459,000 on UniMás in the United States.

== Match ==
=== Pre-match ===
Two days before the match, the Columbus Crew announced that two players had tested positive for COVID-19 and would not be able to play; Darlington Nagbe, Pedro Santos, and Vito Wormgoor were listed as being "medically not cleared to play". Eight Columbus players had previously tested positive for COVID during the MLS Cup Playoffs, but recovered and were allowed to play. The Sounders also announced that defender Xavier Arreaga, who had not played in the playoffs, would miss the match as he had remained in Seattle to await the birth of his child. Seattle was named as favorites to win the MLS Cup by FiveThirtyEight, ESPN FC, and USA Today based on their experience and stronger projected lineup.

Jair Marrufo was announced as the head referee for the match, having previously officiated two MLS Cup finals in 2006 and 2015, the latter of which was also held at Mapfre Stadium. Kathryn Nesbitt was announced as an assistant referee, becoming the first woman to referee a championship match in North American professional men's sports.

=== Summary ===
The match kicked off at 8:30 p.m. Eastern Time at Mapfre Stadium in front of 1,500 spectators. Both teams fielded their starting lineup in a 4–2–3–1 formation, with Columbus making several key changes, including starting 19-year-old Aidan Morris, setting a record for youngest MLS Cup starter; Seattle had an unchanged lineup from the Conference Final. After trading various chances, the Crew earned four set-pieces and had the first major shot on goal, as Gyasi Zardes's shot off a corner kick rebound in the 17th minute was saved by Stefan Frei; an immediate counter-attack by the Sounders led to a strike by Jordan Morris from outside of the penalty area that went wide of the goal.

Columbus opened the scoring in the 25th minute after a cross to the backpost from Harrison Afful found Lucas Zelarayán, whose left-footed volley rolled into the goal after deflecting off Frei. The Crew extended their lead six minutes later as Zelarayán received a cleared header at the top of the penalty area, faked a shot, and provided a square ball to Derrick Etienne, who scored with a curling shot. After attempts by Nouhou for Seattle and Aidan Morris for Columbus were deflected over the goal, the first half ended at 2–0. The Crew entered halftime with an 8–2 lead in shots and the majority of possession.

The Sounders brought on leftback Brad Smith and midfielder Gustav Svensson at halftime and had several unsuccessful chances to score, including two Cristian Roldan shots and a deflection off Afful that turned into a conceded corner kick instead of an own goal. After a few missed attempts from Columbus, Seattle captain Nicolás Lodeiro received a laid-off ball from Jordan Morris at the top of the penalty area that he converted for a wide shot in the 71st minute that narrowly missed the outer post. Svensson added his own attempt with a header three minutes later that also went wide.

Columbus goalkeeper Eloy Room made a one-handed save on a header from Jordan Morris in the 80th minute to preserve a shutout. Two minutes later, Zelarayán received a pass from Luis Díaz and scored his second goal of the match with a left-footed, upper-corner shot to extend the lead to three goals. The Sounders eventually took the majority of possession but were unable to convert their remaining chances, including a long-distance strike from Raúl Ruidíaz in stoppage time, into a consolation goal. The Crew won 3–0, clinching their second MLS Cup title.

=== Details ===
December 12, 2020
8:30 PM EST

Columbus Crew SC	3–0	Seattle Sounders FC
Zelarayán 25', 82'; Etienne 31'	Report

Mapfre Stadium, Columbus, Ohio
Attendance: 1,500
Referee: Jair Marrufo

Columbus Crew SC	Seattle Sounders FC

GK	1	(Curaçao) Eloy Room
RB	25	(Ghana) Harrison Afful
CB	4	(Ghana) Jonathan Mensah (c)
CB	3	(United States) Josh Williams
LB	19	(Argentina) Milton Valenzuela
CM	21	(United States) Aidan Morris
CM	8	(Brazil) Artur	(substituted off) 88'
RW	12	(Costa Rica) Luis Díaz	(substituted off) 90'
AM	10	(Armenia) Lucas Zelarayán
LW	22	(Haiti) Derrick Etienne	(substituted off) 83'
CF	11	(United States) Gyasi Zardes
Substitutes:
GK	13	(United States) Andrew Tarbell
DF	14	(Costa Rica) Waylon Francis	(substituted on) 90'
DF	30	(United States) Aboubacar Keita
MF	16	(United States) Hector Jiménez	(substituted on) 83'
MF	20	(Ghana) Emmanuel Boateng
MF	26	(United States) Fatai Alashe	(substituted on) 88'
MF	34	(Morocco) Youness Mokhtar
FW	9	(Nigeria) Fanendo Adi
FW	29	(Hungary) Krisztián Németh
Manager:
(United States) Caleb Porter

GK	24	(Switzerland) Stefan Frei
RB	16	(United States) Alex Roldan		(substituted off) 60'
CB	28	(Colombia) Yeimar Gómez Andrade
CB	27	(United States) Shane O'Neill		(substituted off) 77'
LB	5	(Cameroon) Nouhou Tolo		(substituted off) 46'
CM	7	(United States) Cristian Roldan
CM	6	(Brazil) João Paulo	(yellow card) 28'	(substituted off) 60'
RW	33	(Trinidad and Tobago) Joevin Jones		(substituted off) 46'
AM	10	(Uruguay) Nicolás Lodeiro (c)
LW	13	(United States) Jordan Morris
CF	9	(Peru) Raúl Ruidíaz
Substitutes:
GK	30	(United States) Stefan Cleveland
DF	2	(Australia) Brad Smith	(yellow card) 49'	(substituted on) 46'
DF	18	(Suriname) Kelvin Leerdam		(substituted on) 60'
DF	29	(Panama) Román Torres
DF	94	(Colombia) Jimmy Medranda		(substituted on) 77'
MF	4	(Sweden) Gustav Svensson		(substituted on) 46'
MF	8	(Martinique) Jordy Delem
MF	11	(United States) Miguel Ibarra
FW	17	(United States) Will Bruin		(substituted on) 60'
Manager:
(United States) Brian Schmetzer

MLS Cup MVP:
Lucas Zelarayán (Columbus Crew SC)

Assistant referees:
Corey Parker
Kathryn Nesbitt
Fourth official:
Alex Chilowicz
Reserve assistant referee:
Cory Richardson
Video assistant referee:
Drew Fischer
Assistant video assistant referee:
Fabio Tovar

Match rules

- 90 minutes.
- 30 minutes of extra time if necessary.
- Penalty shootout if scores still level.
- Maximum of nine named substitutes.
- Maximum of five substitutions, with a sixth allowed in extra time. (Note: Each team was only given three opportunities to make substitutions, with a fourth opportunity in extra time, excluding substitutions made at half-time, before the start of extra time and at half-time in extra time.)

== Post-match ==
The Columbus Crew became the seventh team to win multiple MLS Cups and the seventh to score three or more goals in the title match. Caleb Porter became the third coach to win MLS Cup titles with multiple teams, having also won in 2015 with the Portland Timbers at Mapfre Stadium. Lucas Zelarayán was named the MLS Cup Most Valuable Player and became the first player to score twice in an MLS Cup since Alecko Eskandarian in 2004. The playoffs winning streak for Seattle Sounders FC was halted at eight matches, tied for the longest MLS Cup Playoffs streak in the post-shootout era.

A virtual celebration for the Crew was held at Mapfre Stadium on December 13 in lieu of the traditional victory parade due to the COVID-19 pandemic, with speeches from Bezbatchenko, Porter, and several players. The club announced plans for a large in-person event at a later date after pandemic restrictions were lifted.

As MLS Cup champions, Columbus earned a berth in the 2021 CONCACAF Champions League, the premier international club competition in North America. They were seeded into Pot 1 and faced Nicaraguan club Real Estelí FC in the Round of 16, winning 4–0 away and 1–0 at home to advance 5–0 on aggregate. In the quarterfinals, the Crew drew 2–2 with Mexican champions Monterrey at home but were eliminated after a 3–0 away loss. The Crew also qualified for the 2021 Campeones Cup, where they defeated Liga MX champion Cruz Azul 2–0 at Lower.com Field on September 29, 2021.
