= Óscar Pareja =

Colombian footballer and manager (born 1968)

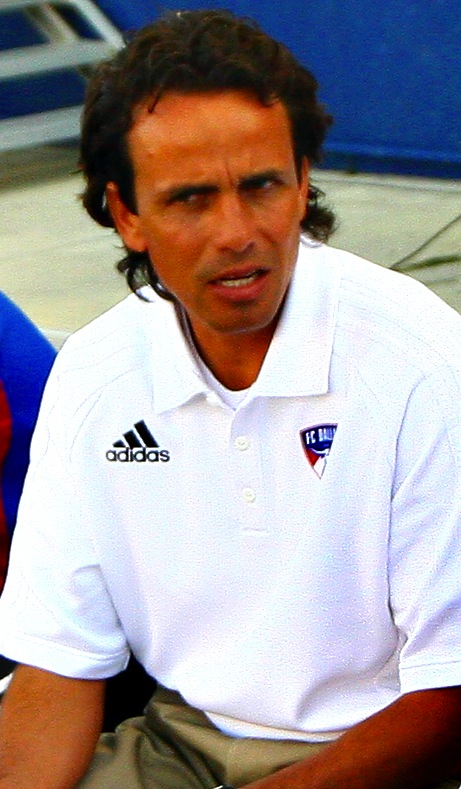
- Pareja with FC Dallas in 2008

Personal information
- Full name: Óscar Alexander Pareja Gómez
- Date of birth: 10 August 1968 (age 58)
- Place of birth: Medellín, Colombia
- Height: 1.73 m (5 ft 8 in)
- Position: Midfielder

Senior career*
Years	Team	Apps	(Gls)
1987–1995	Independiente Medellín	263	(18)
1995–1998	Deportivo Cali	122	(11)
1998	New England Revolution	13	(0)
1998–2005	FC Dallas	170	(13)
Total		568	(42)

International career
1991–1996	Colombia	11	(3)

Managerial career
- 2012–2014: Colorado Rapids
- 2014–2018: FC Dallas
- 2018–2019: Tijuana
- 2019–2026: Orlando City
- * Club domestic league appearances and goals

Óscar Alexander Pareja Gómez (born 10 August 1968) is a Colombian professional football manager and former player who will become head coach of Major League Soccer club D.C. United at the beginning of the 2027 season. Pareja is nicknamed El Generalito, the Little General, but is now called Papi.

Pareja came up through the youth ranks of Independiente Medellín and spent eight years playing for the club, and with them, he broke into the Colombia national team, before transferring to fellow Colombian club Deportivo Cali. Pareja then moved to the United States, where he spent a single season with the New England Revolution before moving to FC Dallas, where he stayed seven years and then retired from playing.

After retiring from playing football, Pareja began his management career as an assistant at FC Dallas before spending a year as an assistant coach to the United States U17s. Pareja then returned for three years to FC Dallas before taking his first head coach job at the Colorado Rapids. Following two years at the helm of the Rapids, Pareja returned to FC Dallas as head coach for four years before moving for a year to Mexican club Tijuana. In 2019, Pareja took the head coaching job at Orlando City. On 11 March 2026, Pareja and Orlando City mutually agreed to part ways after losing its first three matches of the 2026 MLS season.

== Playing career ==
Pareja came up through the youth system of Independiente Medellín; however, he began his professional career in 1987, debuting for renowned club Independiente Medellín. In his debut, he assisted on the winning goal in a 1–0 victory. He played eight years with the club, from 1987 to 1995, helping them to be Categoría Primera A runners-up in 1993, and leading them to a respectable performance in the 1994 Copa Libertadores. In 1995, Deportivo Cali purchased Pareja from Independiente Medellín; he paid immediate dividends, helping Cali to a championship in the 1995–1996 season, their first in 22 years. He would stay with them four years.

Pareja then signed with Major League Soccer (MLS) of the United States. After joining MLS, Pareja was allocated to the New England Revolution on 26 May 1998, but was soon traded to the Dallas Burn for Mexican forward Damian Alvarez. Although Pareja played little for Dallas in 1998, he earned himself a place at the center of Dallas's midfield for the 1999 season, playing 27 games and scoring four goals and six assists, while coordinating the Burn attack. He remained in this position for six more years, playing in 189 regular season games for Dallas, while scoring 13 goals and 52 assists, and was named to the MLS Best XI in 2002. He announced he would retire following the 2005 MLS season and remained with the club, now renamed as FC Dallas, as an assistant coach.

=== International ===
Pareja also played for the Colombia national football team. In 11 caps, he scored three goals and played in the 1991 Copa América.

== Coaching career ==
=== Assistant coach for FC Dallas and US men's U17 ===
Pareja spent two seasons as an assistant coach with FC Dallas in 2006 and 2007. He then left the club to join the United States men's national under-17 soccer team as an assistant coach at the IMG Soccer Academy in 2007–08. He then returned to the coaching staff at FC Dallas as a director and coach in their youth system. He was praised for the system's achievements and was named the U-18 Academy Coach of the Year for the 2010–11 season. For the 2011 MLS season, Pareja returned to the first team as an assistant coach. He was also head coach for the reserve team.

=== Colorado Rapids ===
The Colorado Rapids signed Pareja to his first head coach job on 5 January 2012. After finishing 7th in his debut season, Pareja led the Rapids to the playoffs in 2013. After two seasons he stepped down as Colorado head coach on 4 January 2014.

=== FC Dallas ===
Pareja was announced as the head coach of his former club, FC Dallas, on 10 January 2014, after Dallas traded a first-round 2015 MLS SuperDraft pick and allocation money to Colorado. Having missed the playoffs the last two seasons prior to Pareja's arrival, FC Dallas made the postseason in his debut season as head coach. In 2015, Dallas topped the Western Conference regular season table, finishing runners-up for the Supporters' Shield to New York Red Bulls. The following year the club did a domestic double winning both the Supporters' Shield and the U.S. Open Cup, defeating New England Revolution 4–2 in the final. It was the club's first Supporters' Shield win and second time lifting the U.S. Open Cup having last done so in 1997. Amid speculation about interest from Liga MX, Pareja stepped down as manager of Dallas following the completion of the 2018 season. He had a combined 18 years at the club as a player, coach, and manager.

=== Club Tijuana ===
Club Tijuana announced Pareja as their new manager on 27 November 2018. After 12 months, Pareja left Tijuana under mutual agreement

=== Orlando City ===
On 4 December 2019, Pareja returned to MLS, becoming the fourth permanent head coach of Orlando City. With the season affected by the COVID-19 pandemic two rounds into the season, Pareja guided Orlando to the MLS is Back Tournament final on the resumption of play, the team's first final in their MLS era. Orlando finished top of Group A taking 7 points from three matches and notably eliminated reigning Supporters' Shield winners Los Angeles FC in the quarter-final before eventually losing to Portland Timbers 2–1 in the final. In 2022, Pareja led Orlando City to its first title since joining Major League Soccer, winning the U.S. Open Cup.

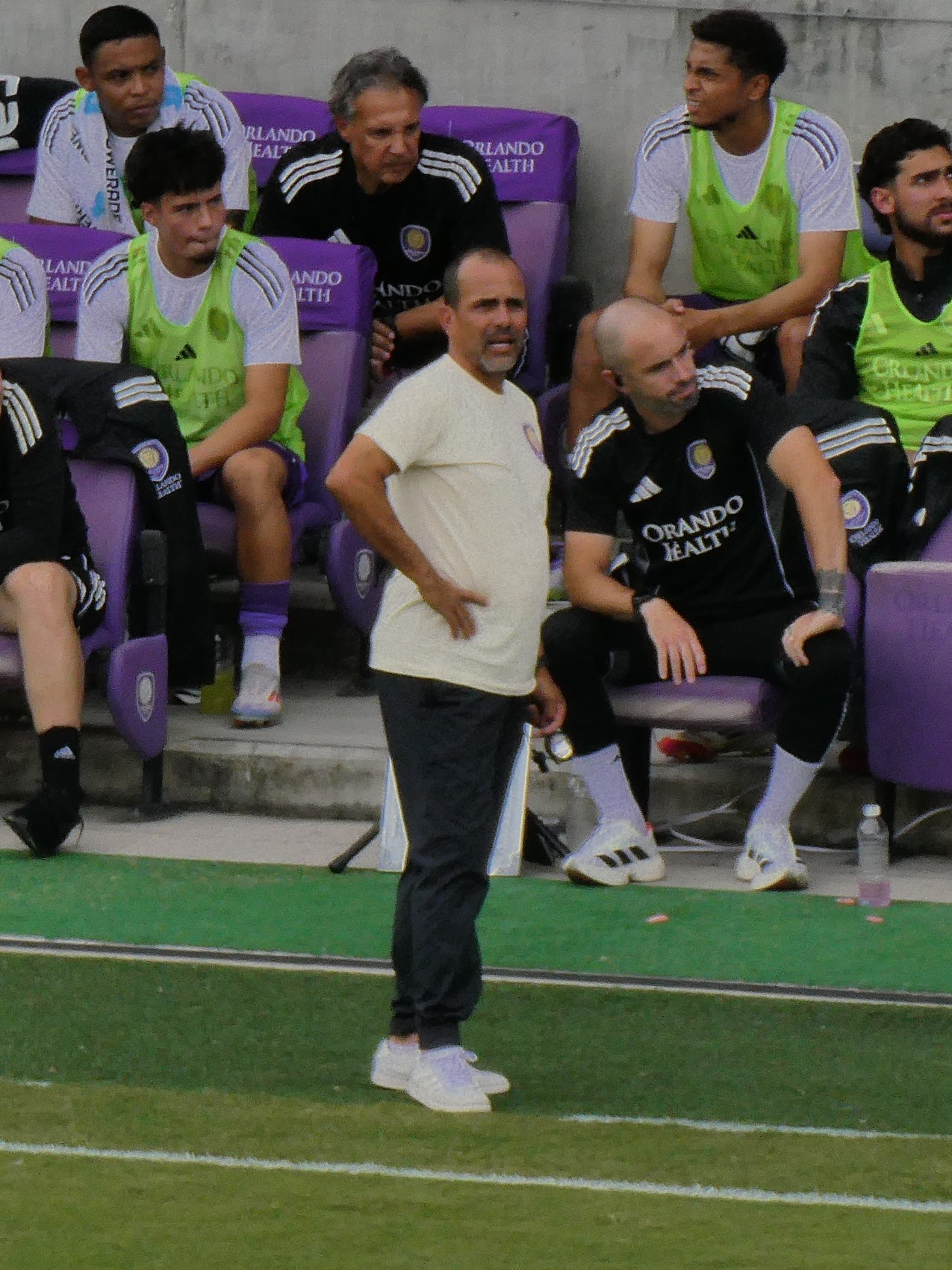
Pareja with Orlando City in 2025

On 16 April 2025, Pareja signed a contract extension with Orlando City which would see him contracted to the club until 2028. On 15 May, Pareja was named coach of the Team of the Matchday for managing the team to their second ever 10-match unbeaten streak in a 3–1 win over Charlotte FC. Four days later, Pareja was once again named coach of the Team of the Matchday for extending that streak to 11 unbeaten league games and 12 unbeaten games across all competitions–tying the team's all-time record in the latter–in a 3–0 win at rivals Inter Miami. On 28 July, Pareja was again named coach of the Team of the Matchday, this time for leading his team to a 3–1 comeback victory at the Columbus Crew three days earlier, only the second home loss of the Crew's season. Pareja was again named coach of the Team of the Matchday the following matchweek for leading Orlando City to a 4–1 win over Inter Miami, completing a 7–1 sweep of the Lions' rivals across the regular season.

After starting the 2026 season with three consecutive losses, Pareja and Orlando City mutually agreed to part ways. In an interview later, Pareja reiterated that the decision was mutual and that he asked for a "settlement because I had another three years" because he believed it was "time to stop". Pareja also said that he would be taking a hiatus from management.

=== D.C. United ===
On 14 November 2026, Pareja was announced by D.C. United as their next head coach on a multiyear contract beginning at the start of the 2027 season.

== Personal life ==
Pareja's son, Diego, is a professional footballer with Orlando City's reserve affiliate, Orlando City B, which plays in MLS Next Pro. Diego also trained with the academy of FC Dallas during Pareja's tenure at the team.

== Coaching record ==
All competitive games are included.

As of 11 March 2026

Coaching record by team and tenure
Team	Nat	From	To	Record							
Team	Nat	From	To	P	W	D	L	GF	GA	GD	Win %
Colorado Rapids	(United States)	5 January 2012	4 January 2014	72	26	13	33	93	96	−3	36.11
FC Dallas	(United States)	10 January 2014	16 November 2018	207	97	52	58	327	267	+60	46.86
Club Tijuana	(Mexico)	27 November 2018	25 November 2019	48	22	6	20	65	70	−5	45.83
Orlando City SC	(United States)	4 December 2019	11 March 2026	240	102	67	71	381	328	+53	42.50
Career totals				567	247	138	182	866	761	+105	43.56

== Player honors ==
Individual

- MLS Best XI: 2002

== Coaching honors ==
FC Dallas

- Supporters' Shield: 2016
  - Runners-up: 2015
- U.S. Open Cup: 2016

Orlando City SC

- U.S. Open Cup: 2022
- Supporters' Shield
  - Runners-up: 2023
- Eastern Conference (regular season)
  - Runners-up: 2023
- Eastern Conference (play-offs)
  - Runners-up: 2024

== See also ==
- List of MLS coaches
