= Gary Smith (footballer, born 1968) =

English football player and manager (born 1968)

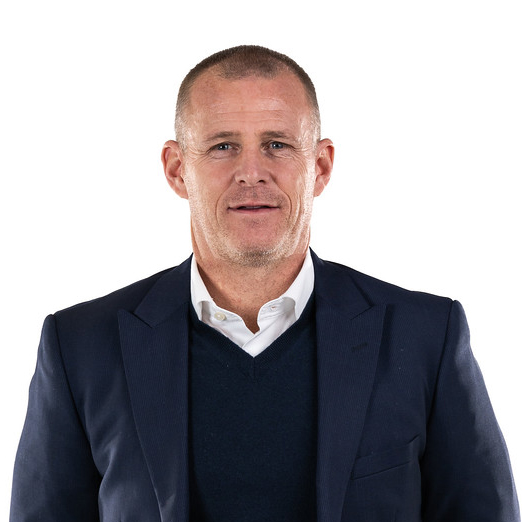

Personal information
- Full name: Gary Neil Smith
- Date of birth: 3 December 1968 (age 57)
- Place of birth: Harlow, England
- Position: Midfielder

Youth career
- 1982–1983: Arsenal
- 1983–1985: Fulham

Senior career*
Years	Team	Apps	(Gls)
1985–1987	Fulham	1	(0)
1987–1988	Colchester United	11	(0)
1989	Enfield	44	(0)
1990–1992	Wycombe Wanderers	66	(4)
1992–1993	Welling United	27	(0)
1993–1995	Barnet	14	(0)
1995–1997	Aylesbury United	48	(0)
1997–1998	Gravesend & Northfleet	28	(2)
Total		211	(4)

Managerial career
- 2008–2011: Colorado Rapids
- 2012–2013: Stevenage
- 2015: Atlanta Silverbacks
- 2018–2024: Nashville SC
- * Club domestic league appearances and goals

Gary Neil Smith (born 3 December 1968) is an English football manager and former player who most recently managed Major League Soccer side Nashville SC.

Smith's playing career began at Fulham, progressing through the youth team before making one first-team appearance for the club. After a brief spell with Colchester United, Smith joined non-league side Enfield in 1989. His most successful spell during his playing days was at Wycombe Wanderers, spending two seasons with the club. After a season with Welling United, Smith returned to the Football League in 1993, when he signed for Barnet. Following a spell at Aylesbury United, Smith retired as a professional player, with his career blighted through numerous injuries.

He turned to the coaching side of the game in an attempt to forge a career for himself following his premature retirement. After a spell coaching at Wimbledon, Smith was appointed youth team coach at Wycombe Wanderers in 2004. He joined Watford ahead of the 2005–06 campaign, combining the roles of reserve team manager with his U18 managerial duties. Smith then worked as a scout for Arsenal in 2007. His first managerial post was at MLS side Colorado Rapids, when he was appointed as manager in November 2008, following a successful spell as interim head coach. He spent three seasons at Colorado, with the club winning the 2010 MLS Cup, the first major trophy in the club's history. Despite his success, Colorado opted against renewing Smith's contract in November 2011. In January 2012, Smith was appointed as manager of League One side Stevenage. He guided the club to the League One play-offs that season, where they were defeated over two legs in the semi-final. In March 2013, he was sacked by the club after a poor run of form during the second half of the 2012–13 season.

== Playing career ==
After a brief spell at Arsenal as a schoolboy, Smith joined Fulham's youth academy in 1983. He progressed through the youth ranks at the club, and made one first-team appearance during the 1985–86 season. Smith was released in 1987, having spent four years on the books at Fulham. Smith signed for Colchester United on a free transfer in November 1987, making his debut at the age of 18 in a 2–1 away victory at Halifax Town. He went on to make 12 appearances for Colchester in all competitions during the 1987–88 season, his last a 4–0 defeat to Bolton Wanderers on 2 May 1988. He was released by the club at the end of the season. After a spell at Enfield in the first half of the 1989–90 season, where he appeared against Darlington in October 1989, Smith joined Wycombe Wanderers in January 1990. It was to be Smith's most successful spell during his playing days, scoring four goals in 66 Football Conference games over two seasons. However, towards the end of his time at the club, he suffered a number of injuries, including a compound fracture that Smith would never fully recover from. After spending a season at Welling United, Smith returned to the Football League in 1993, signing for Barnet, spending two seasons with the club, with Smith suffering similar injury problems. He spent time at Aylesbury United during the 1995–96 campaign, making his debut in 1–0 away defeat to Dulwich Hamlet on the opening day of the season. Smith went on to make 43 appearances in all competitions for Aylesbury during the season. He remained at Aylesbury for a further season, making his final appearance for the club in a 3–1 victory against Heybridge Swifts in April 1997. He moved on to Gravesend & Northfleet after that, retiring following his final game there in December 1998.

== Coaching career ==
Smith began his coaching career with Wimbledon at the age of 28, gaining his UEFA 'A' licence coaching badge two years later. After Wimbledon's relocation to Milton Keynes, manager Tony Adams offered Smith the chance to take up the role of youth team coach at Wycombe Wanderers in 2004, where he later became assistant first team coach. Following the resignation of Adams, Smith briefly filled the role of assistant manager to caretaker manager Keith Ryan in November 2004, and the club were unbeaten under their guidance. Smith reverted to his previous role of youth team coach when Wycombe appointed manager John Gorman on 30 November 2004. Ahead of the 2005–06 campaign, Smith was offered the chance to take up the post of assistant academy manager at Championship side Watford, formally taking the position on 24 June 2005. Wycombe manager Gorman stated — "I will miss Gary. He helped Keith Ryan in the time between Tony leaving and me arriving and they did a great job. We didn't want to lose him but he's been headhunted and you can't stop someone from having an opportunity. He's a very good coach at this level and I think he'll go onto do a great job".

In July 2005, after just a month as assistant academy manager, Smith was appointed as reserve team coach for Watford. It was announced that Smith would take control of the reserve side on matchdays, as well as act as the Academy U18 team manager, thus taking on dual responsibilities. Smith later worked as a scout for Arsenal in 2007.

=== Colorado Rapids ===
Smith joined MLS side Colorado Rapids in February 2008, originally to establish Arsenal's academy in Colorado – with Arsenal and Colorado Rapids having forged a strong "strategic partnership" due to Stan Kroenke's ownership. However, Smith stated his role "unexpectedly took on a different nature" as he spent more time supporting the first-team, subsequently taking the job as assistant manager. He assumed an interim head coach position during the latter half of 2008 following the resignation of his predecessor, Fernando Clavijo, with Colorado bottom of the league table. After a successful ten-game trial period, Smith was formally given the head coach position on 11 November 2008, signing a three-year contract with the club. Smith's first game in-charge as head coach was a 2–1 defeat to Chivas USA on 22 March 2009, the club's first match of the 2009 MLS campaign. He secured his first win as head coach a week later as Colorado beat Kansas City Wizards 2–1 at Dick's Sporting Goods Park. During Colorado's 2009 campaign, Smith guided the club to a ninth-place finish, narrowly missing out on the MLS Cup play-offs following a 3–0 away defeat to eventual MLS Cup winners Real Salt Lake on the last day of the season. The victory subsequently meant that RSL took the final play-off position on goal difference ahead of Colorado.

Smith remained at Colorado ahead of the 2010 season, revamping the squad from the previous season, as well as making numerous inexpensive moves to sign low-key MLS players. The club started the season positively, and ultimately secured a spot in the MLS Cup play-offs after finishing in seventh place. During the regular season, Colorado boasted the best home record in the division, similarly to the 2009 campaign under Smith. Smith's side beat Columbus Crew on penalties following a 2–2 aggregate draw in the play-off semi-finals, before disposing of San Jose Earthquakes in the Conference Final courtesy of a 1–0 home victory on 13 November 2010. Eight days later, on 21 November 2010, Colorado beat FC Dallas in the Final following a 2–1 extra-time victory, to win the 2010 MLS Cup. The victory meant that Smith had guided Colorado to their first MLS Cup championship, and also the first major trophy in the club's history. Smith also became the first English coach to win the MLS Cup championship.

Smith's third season at Colorado got off to a strong start, with the club recording three successive league victories. However, Colorado "endured a difficult season" from then onwards, with the club struggling with injuries to key players such as Conor Casey, Caleb Folan, Pablo Mastroeni, Drew Moor and Jamie Smith. As a result of the 2010 MLS Cup victory, Colorado were also participating in the CONCACAF Champions League for the first time in their history, but were knocked out in the group stage as a result of a 2–0 defeat to Santos Laguna in the last group match, consequently finishing in third place. Smith guided the club to a sixth-place finish in the league, with Colorado defeating Columbus Crew in the first-round wild-card match. They were, however, defeated 4–0 on aggregate by Sporting Kansas City in the Conference semi-finals in November 2011.

Five days after the defeat to Kansas City, it was announced that Colorado had opted against renewing Smith's contract at the end of the 2011 MLS season. Colorado had initially offered Smith a four-year contract extension following the progression the club had made, but disagreement over decision-making processes resulted in the club and Smith parting ways. On ending Smith's three-year tenure with the club, Colorado's managing director Jeff Plush, announced that "it would be in the best interest of both parties to move in a different direction". Following his departure from Colorado, Smith stated that his role at the club had become untenable because Plush, alongside technical director Paul Bravo and, "bizarrely", chief marketing officer Tim Hinchey, had an "increased role in the construction of the roster". Smith stated — "Paul, Jeff, Tim, they were involved in the player decisions, and they were the source of a lot of conflict. When I took the job, I was told I would have the final say. But over time that required more confrontation, more energy, and I was sick and tired of the backbiting".

=== Stevenage ===
Smith was appointed as manager of League One side Stevenage on 25 January 2012, signing a contract until 2014. He had watched Stevenage's 4–2 victory against Milton Keynes at Broadhall Way a day prior to his appointment. On joining Stevenage, Smith stated — "This team is on such a good run, there isn't an awful lot I want to change about the group. I hope I can be a support for some of the guys and point them in a direction if needed". Smith's first game in-charge of the club was a home FA Cup tie against Notts County, played on 28 January, with Stevenage winning the match 1–0. The victory meant Stevenage progressed to the Fifth Round of the competition for the first time in their history. Stevenage would go on to take Premier League side Tottenham Hotspur to a replay, before losing 3–1 at White Hart Lane. Smith's first league game as manager was a trip to Hillsborough to face Sheffield Wednesday on 14 February, with Stevenage securing a 1–0 away victory. Stevenage went on to win just one league game out of the following thirteen, although nine of which were draws. The run of form left Stevenage in ninth position, and six points behind the play-off places with just five games remaining. A run of four wins out of their last five matches, two of which against play-off rivals Carlisle United and Brentford, and another a 6–0 away win against Yeovil Town, meant that Stevenage ended up securing the final play-off spot on goal difference – following a 3–0 home victory against Bury on the last day of the season. Smith's side went on to lose to Sheffield United in the play-off semi-final by an aggregate scoreline of 1–0.

Smith went about trying to rebuild the squad ahead of the 2012–13 season following a mass exodus of players. Despite his best efforts to retain a number of players from the previous season, fifteen players departed during the summer; seven of which were released, four rejected contracts to move to Preston North End, while a further three moved for undisclosed fees. Smith signed thirteen players before the summer transfer window closed, most of which on free transfers, although James Dunne and Lucas Akins joined for undisclosed fees. Despite the squad overhaul, Stevenage began the season positively, going on an eleven match unbeaten run. After a 2–1 home victory over Portsmouth in late October 2012, Stevenage found themselves in second place, just a point behind league leaders Tranmere Rovers. However, Stevenage were defeated heavily in three of their next four matches, conceding four goals in each of the three losses. From December 2012 onwards, Stevenage would go on to lose 14 out of their following 18 league games, including a run of six straight defeats. Although they secured impressive home victories over two promotion-chasing sides in March 2013; a 1–0 win over Brentford, and a 4–0 home victory against Sheffield United, Stevenage had fallen to 15th place. Three days after the victory over Sheffield United, on 19 March, Stevenage lost 2–0 away to bottom placed Bury. A day later, Stevenage released a statement announcing Smith had been sacked after a "worrying" run of results.

=== Atlanta Silverbacks ===
On 23 December 2014, the Atlanta Silverbacks, a team in the second-tier North American Soccer league, announced that Smith would take over as the team's head coach for the 2015 season. The announcement came only weeks after the league announced that it would take over the ownership of the team to prevent it from folding when the previous owners could not find buyers for the team.

=== Nashville SC ===
On 12 April 2017, Smith was announced as the team's first head coach for the inaugural season of Nashville SC, a new professional club in the United Soccer League. Smith's first match in charge of the club was a preseason exhibition match against Atlanta United FC of MLS. In a rain-soaked contest, Nashville was defeated by Atlanta, 3–1. Smith's first USL victory came on 31 March, when Nashville SC defeated Bethlehem Steel FC 1–0.

Smith coached Nashville SC to a 12-9-13 record in USL play, good enough for a playoff appearance before being knocked out by Cincinnati FC in penalties. Nashville also won three U.S. Open Cup games in its inaugural season, which included a victory over Smith's former club, the Colorado Rapids of MLS.

On 6 March 2019, the club announced Smith would be the head coach for 2020, when Nashville SC joined Major League Soccer as an expansion team. "As we set out to build our MLS team and (general manager Mike Jacobs) and I conducted our search throughout the game for a head coach, we always kept coming back to Gary as the first and best candidate for the job," Nashville SC CEO Ian Ayre said in a statement.

Smith's second season at Nashville got off to a stronger start, with the club winning its first match 2–0 against Loudon United FC. His team's four consecutive victories from 17 July to 7 August vaulted the club to the third spot in the Eastern Conference table.

As Nashville made the transition to MLS, much of the success Smith enjoyed in USL transferred over, with his Nashville side reaching the Eastern Conference Semifinals in each of the club's first two seasons in the top flight, and only losing at home twice across the two campaigns, the most recent home defeat coming on 4 November 2020 against FC Dallas.

To begin the 2022 season, Nashville would play each of its first eight contests on the road due to ongoing construction of Geodis Park. Smith guided his side to an impressive eleven points before the new 30,000 seat venue opened against Philadelphia Union. Smith also guided Nashville to the quarterfinals of the Lamar Hunt US Open Cup.

On 16 May 2024, a day after a 2-0 win over Toronto FC, Nashville announced that Smith had departed the club with immediate effect.

== Personal life ==
Smith was born in Harlow, Essex, and grew up in Cheshunt, Hertfordshire, with most of his family hailing from Tottenham. His grandparents lived next to White Hart Lane, with Smith recalling being able to hear the roar of the crowd from their back garden. Despite his family all supporting Tottenham Hotspur, Smith supports Arsenal. Smith, his wife, Emma, and their three children moved recently to the Nashville area.

Smith's father, Roger, played for Tottenham Hotspur for six years. After his playing days, Roger became a youth academy coach at Arsenal, before later becoming a scout for the club. Roger was appointed chief scout at Cardiff City in 2008.

== Managerial statistics ==
As of 15 May 2024

Team	Nation	From	To	Record				
Team	Nation	From	To	G	W	D	L	Win %
Colorado Rapids	(United States)	20 August 2008	7 November 2011	122	45	37	40	36.89
Stevenage	(England)	25 January 2012	20 March 2013	67	22	19	26	32.84
Atlanta Silverbacks	(United States)	23 December 2014	11 January 2016	32	8	12	12	25.00
Nashville SC (USL)	(United States)	12 April 2017	3 November 2019	77	37	22	18	48.05
Nashville SC	(United States)	3 November 2019	16 May 2024	161	61	57	43	37.89
Total				459	173	147	139	37.69

== Honours ==
=== As manager ===
Colorado Rapids

- MLS Cup: 2010
