= Bob Bradley =

American soccer coach (born 1958)

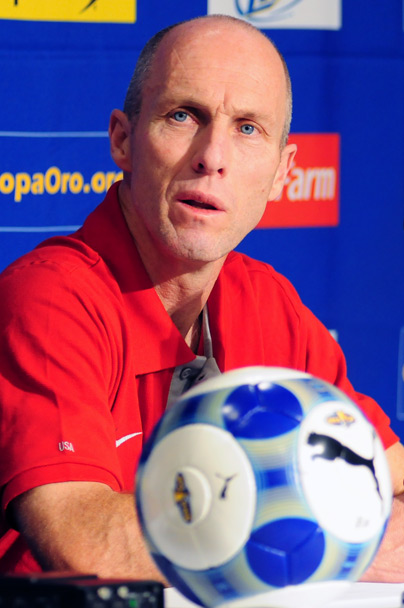
- Bradley in 2009

Personal information
- Full name: Robert Frank Bradley
- Date of birth: March 3, 1958 (age 68)
- Place of birth: Montclair, New Jersey, U.S.

College career
Years	Team	Apps	(Gls)
1977–1980	Princeton Tigers		

Managerial career
- 1981–1982: Ohio Bobcats
- 1984–1995: Princeton Tigers
- 1997–2002: Chicago Fire
- 2002–2005: MetroStars
- 2005–2006: Chivas USA
- 2006–2007: United States U23
- 2006–2011: United States
- 2011–2013: Egypt
- 2014–2015: Stabæk
- 2015–2016: Le Havre
- 2016: Swansea City
- 2017–2021: Los Angeles FC
- 2021–2023: Toronto FC
- 2023–2024: Stabæk
Medal record
Men's soccer
Representing United States (as manager)
CONCACAF Gold Cup
Winner	2007
Runner-up	2009
Runner-up	2011
FIFA Confederations Cup
Runner-up	2009

Robert Frank Bradley (born March 3, 1958) is an American soccer coach, who most recently managed Norwegian football team Stabæk.

A native of New Jersey and graduate of Princeton University, Bradley coached in the American college game and Major League Soccer (MLS), managing the Chicago Fire, MetroStars, and Chivas USA over nine seasons. In 2006, he was appointed manager of the United States men's team, winning the CONCACAF Gold Cup in 2007 and finishing runner-up in 2009 and 2011 as well as in the 2009 FIFA Confederations Cup. His team also reached the last 16 of the 2010 FIFA World Cup. He subsequently managed the Egyptian national football team for two years.

He then became the first American to manage a team in a European first division with Stabæk of Norway in 2014. He moved on to French club Le Havre and Welsh side Swansea City, becoming the first American to manage a Premier League club, but was fired less than three months later. He returned to MLS, managing Los Angeles FC and Toronto FC.

== Early life and career ==
Bradley was born and raised in New Jersey, playing soccer at West Essex High School and Princeton University. Following his graduation from Princeton, Bradley briefly worked in the Procter & Gamble executive training program before entering the Ohio University sports management graduate school in 1981. While there, Bradley's coaching career began when he was named head coach of the Ohio University Bobcats's NCAA Division I soccer program at the age of 22. After two seasons with Ohio, Bradley worked as an assistant coach and scout for University of Virginia manager Bruce Arena for two years before taking the top job at his alma mater, Princeton. Bradley led the Tigers from 1984 to 1995, winning two Ivy League titles and reaching the NCAA Final Four in 1993.

== Coaching career ==
=== Major League Soccer ===
In 1996, Bradley was hired again as Arena's assistant, this time with D.C. United of Major League Soccer, the then newly formed U.S. professional league. After back-to-back championship seasons with DC, he became the first head coach of the Chicago Fire, an expansion team that began play in 1998. Bradley steered the newly assembled squad to the MLS Cup and U.S. Open Cup double in its first season and was named MLS Coach of the Year for his achievements. He won a third trophy in 2000, when the Fire again won the Open Cup.

After the 2002 MLS season, Bradley resigned as coach of the Fire to return to New Jersey as head coach of the MetroStars (now the New York Red Bulls). Bradley began his tenure with the historically underachieving team headed in the right direction as the MetroStars advanced to the U.S. Open Cup final for the first time in club history in 2003 as well as earning a playoff berth. Bradley also gained attention for an infamous incident in a match against D.C. United that season in which he exploited an MLS rule allowing a 4th substitution for a goalkeeper by switching starting goalkeeper Tim Howard into an outfield player so that midfielder Eddie Gaven (who would go on to score the winning goal) could enter the game classified as a goalkeeper, before switching positions with Howard after ten seconds of play.

Bradley stayed with the MetroStars for three years before he was fired with three games left in the 2005 regular season. The club had suffered losses in back-to-back fixtures and diminishing playoff prospects prior to Bradley's firing. Shortly after leaving the MetroStars, Bradley was named the coach at Los Angeles club Chivas USA for the 2006 season. Bradley revived a Chivas USA team that had endured a poor inaugural season in 2005, discovering young talents such as Sacha Kljestan and Jonathan Bornstein and leading the team to a third-place finish in the Western Conference before losing in the playoffs to eventual champions Houston Dynamo.

=== United States ===
Following the U.S. men's national team's disappointing showing at the 2006 FIFA World Cup, U.S. Soccer appointed Bradley the interim coach of the team, succeeding Arena in December 2006. On his debut on January 20, his team defeated Denmark 3–1 in a friendly in Los Angeles. In May, having won three out of four games, he was appointed permanently. His team won the 2007 CONCACAF Gold Cup in June, with a 2–1 final win over Mexico. Weeks later at the 2007 Copa América in Venezuela, the team lost all three games, his first defeats in charge.

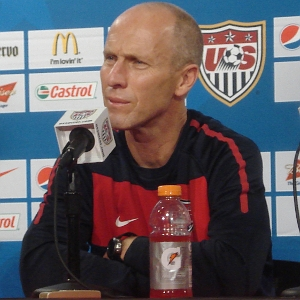
Bradley as manager of the United States in May 2010

Bradley led the U.S. team to an unlikely second-place finish in the 2009 Confederations Cup, including a 2–0 semi-final victory over European champions Spain, ending the Spaniards' 35-game unbeaten streak and 15-game winning streak. In the final, Bradley's U.S. team opened up a 2–0 lead on Brazil before losing 3–2. With the 2009 CONCACAF Gold Cup taking place immediately following the Confederations Cup, Bradley selected a largely second-tier squad, which advanced to the final before losing 5–0 to Mexico. With a 3–2 away win against Honduras on October 10, the team secured qualification for the 2010 FIFA World Cup.

At the World Cup finals in South Africa, the U.S. finished on top of Group C after a 1–1 draw with England, a 2–2 draw with Slovenia, and a 1–0 victory over Algeria through a dramatic late goal by Landon Donovan. In the knockout round, Bradley and the U.S. faced Ghana, who eliminated the Americans for the second consecutive World Cup with a 2–1 victory in extra time following a 1–1 draw.

Following the World Cup, Bradley signed a contract extension in August 2010 to remain as the U.S. coach until the 2014 World Cup after a reported approach from English club Aston Villa. In June 2011 he led the U.S. to the final of the 2011 CONCACAF Gold Cup, but an early 2–0 lead in the final was overturned by Mexico, who eventually won 4–2. On July 28, 2011, he was relieved of his duties by the United States Soccer Federation to be replaced by former Germany national team manager Jürgen Klinsmann.

=== Egypt ===
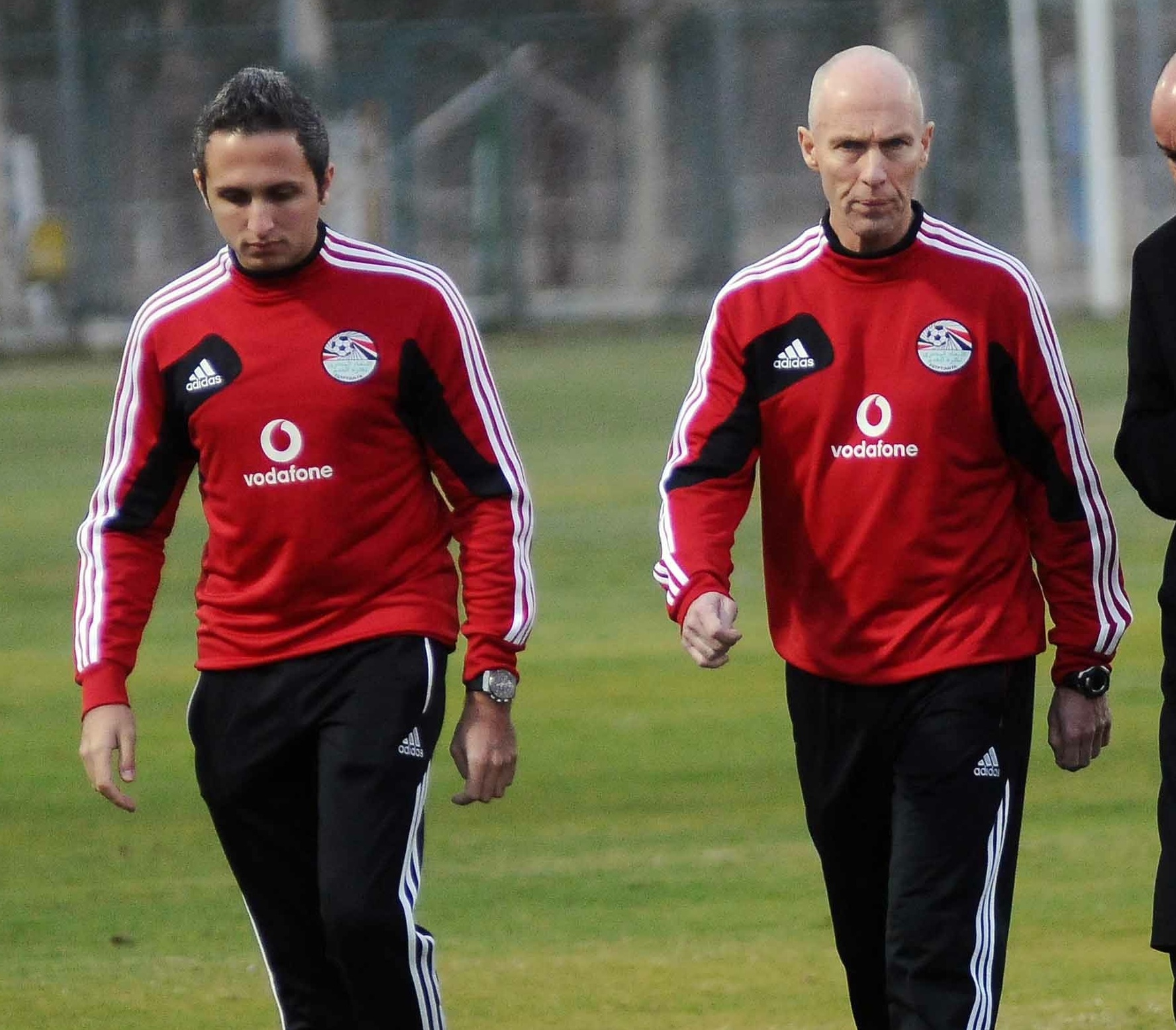
Bradley (right) during a training session for the Egyptian national team in December 2012

On September 14, 2011, Bradley reached a deal to take over as manager of the Egypt national team beginning October 15, 2011. He made his debut on November 14, in a friendly against Brazil, losing 2–0. Bradley was praised for choosing to live in Egypt despite the unrest following the Egyptian Revolution of 2011 and continuing to guide the Pharaohs despite the suspension of the Egyptian Premier League following the Port Said Stadium riot.

Egypt was perfect in its first six matches of qualifying for the 2014 FIFA World Cup, but fell decisively to Ghana in the third round playoffs. Bradley was not retained following Egypt's elimination. American Pharaoh, a documentary by Hossam Aboul-Magd about Bradley's tenure in Egypt, aired on PBS on June 16, 2014.

=== Stabæk Fotball ===
It was reported on January 2, 2014, that Bradley had agreed to manage Stabæk in Norway, making him the first American to manage a club in a European top flight. His competitive debut came on March 30, in a 3–0 home win over Sogndal. During this tenure the club reached the qualifying phase of the Europa League, also a first for an American coach. On November 5, 2015, Stabæk announced that Bradley would be leaving the club at the end of the season to pursue other jobs.

=== Le Havre ===
On November 10, 2015, Bradley was officially named as the new manager of French Ligue 2 side Le Havre, signing a two-year contract. He recorded his first win at the club on December 1 against Evian TG in a 3–2 victory at home. Bradley led the team to a tie on points with Metz for third place in the league and the final promotion place, but the team was left in fourth based on the goals scored tiebreaker.

Bradley managed his final match on October 3, 2016, a league home game against Sochaux, which Le Havre won 2–1.

=== Swansea City ===
On October 3, 2016, Bradley was appointed as the new Swansea City manager after Francesco Guidolin's dismissal. The Swansea supporters trust – who own a 21% stake in the club – issued a statement saying they were 'disappointed' in the new appointment given Bradley had been appointed without them being consulted. With the appointment, Bradley became the first American to manage a Premier League club. Many fans and pundits criticized the appointment, suggesting that he had been given the job by the club's new American owners by virtue of being American.

On December 27, 2016, following a 1–4 defeat by West Ham United, Bradley was sacked by Swansea after only 85 days and 11 games in charge of the club, the fourth shortest reign of any manager in the history of the Premier League. He left with a 2–7–2 record, conceding 29 goals – the most goals conceded by any Premier League club in the same time period, with Swansea gaining only 8 (24.2%) out of a maximum 33 points available for the 11 game period – an average of 0.73 points per game. In a club statement, Huw Jenkins, the Swansea chairman, said: "We are sorry to lose Bob after such a short period of time. Unfortunately things haven't worked out as planned and we felt we had to make the change with half the Premier League season remaining. Personally, I have nothing but praise for Bob. He is a good man; a good person who gave everything to the job. His work-rate is phenomenal and we wish him well for the future."

Following his sacking, Bradley said that the club's owners Steve Kaplan and Jason Levien were swayed by a "negative atmosphere" at the club and failed to realize this was a project and that they needed to stick to the plan. He also said: "You can look at even top managers and recognize that in a league as competitive as the Premier League, anyone can go through a stretch of 10 or 11 games where you don't get the results you should.''

At Swansea, Bradley had been criticized for using American soccer vocabulary such as "PK" for a penalty kick and "road game" for what the British call an away game. He defended himself by saying that the vocabulary for the game varies in every country. Sky Sports program Soccer AM parodied him as the character "Brad Bobley", an American coach who uses exaggeratedly American words. Analysis by The Wall Street Journal found that Bradley in fact used British terms such as training, supporters and clean sheet far more frequently than their American equivalents practice, fans and shutout, and had never once called the sport soccer in a British interview.

=== Los Angeles FC ===
On July 27, 2017, Bradley was announced as the team's first head coach for the inaugural season of Los Angeles FC, an expansion MLS team that started playing in the 2018 season. On March 4, 2018, Los Angeles FC won 1–0 against the Seattle Sounders in the team's first ever game. It was Bradley's first domestic club job since leaving Chivas USA for the USMNT in 2006.

During Bradley's time in Los Angeles, he established LAFC as a leading club in the league, guiding the club to the post-season in their first three seasons of existence. In 2019, the Black and Gold amassed the most points at that time in MLS history with 72, winning the Supporters' Shield in the process. The club lost to the Seattle Sounders in that year's conference final, 2–1.

On November 18, 2021, 11 days after LAFC failed to qualify for the playoffs for the first time, Bradley and Los Angeles FC parted ways.

=== Toronto FC ===
On November 24, 2021, Bradley was announced as head coach and sporting director of Toronto FC, reuniting with his son Michael, who had been the club's captain since 2015. He tied 1–1 at FC Dallas on his debut the following February 26, concluding his first season in second-from-bottom in the Eastern Conference; the team signed Italian international trio Domenico Criscito, Lorenzo Insigne and Federico Bernardeschi in July 2022.

Bradley's Toronto FC won the delayed 2020 Canadian Championship on June 5, 2022, with a penalty shootout win over Forge FC in Hamilton, Ontario. The following month, they lost the 2022 edition to the Vancouver Whitecaps on the same method.

On June 26, 2023, Toronto FC announced that it had parted ways with Bradley after a 3W-10D-4L record to start the season.

=== Return to Stabæk ===
In September 2023, Bradley returned to Stabæk on a deal until the end of the 2023 Eliteserien season, with the option for a further year. His new team was in second-last place with 11 games remaining. He was unable to prevent the team from relegation to the Norwegian First Division, but his contract was renewed, with his son Michael joining him as a volunteer coach. In September 2024, he departed the club, agreeing to a mutual termination of his contract, with the club sitting in seventh place in the second tier.

== Personal life ==
Bob Bradley is the eldest of three brothers. The middle sibling, Scott, played for the Seattle Mariners and three other Major League Baseball teams in the 1980s and 1990s, and is the current baseball coach at Princeton University. The youngest, Jeff, was a sports journalist who has worked for ESPN and the New York Daily News.

Bradley is married to Lindsay (née Sheehan), a former University of Virginia lacrosse player. Their son, Michael, was drafted by the MetroStars in the 2004 MLS SuperDraft, and played in the Eredivisie, Bundesliga, Premier League and Serie A before transferring to Toronto FC in January 2014. Bob also has a daughter named Ryan, who is married to Andy Rose, a former professional soccer player for Vancouver Whitecaps FC and current assistant coach for Seattle Sounders.

== Coaching statistics ==
As of match played 21 September 2024

Coaching record by team and tenure
Team	Nat.	From	To	Record				
Team	Nat.	From	To	G	W	D	L	Win %
Chicago Fire	(United States)	October 30, 1997	October 5, 2002	197	103	33	61	52.28
MetroStars	(United States)	October 22, 2002	October 4, 2005	100	36	27	37	36.00
Chivas USA	(United States)	November 23, 2005	December 8, 2006	35	11	14	10	31.43
United States	(United States)	December 8, 2006	July 28, 2011	80	43	12	25	53.75
Egypt	(Egypt)	September 14, 2011	November 20, 2013	36	22	6	8	61.11
Stabæk	(Norway)	January 3, 2014	November 8, 2015	72	38	11	23	52.78
Le Havre	(France)	November 10, 2015	October 3, 2016	37	17	10	10	45.95
Swansea City	(Wales)	October 3, 2016	December 27, 2016	11	2	2	7	18.18
Los Angeles FC	(United States)	July 27, 2017	November 18, 2021	142	68	34	40	47.89
Toronto FC	(Canada)	November 24, 2021	June 26, 2023	59	14	19	26	23.73
Stabæk	(Norway)	September 10, 2023	September 22, 2024	38	16	10	12	42.11
Total				807	370	179	258	45.85

== Honors ==
Chicago Fire

- MLS Cup: 1998
- U.S. Open Cup: 1998, 2000

Los Angeles FC

- Supporters' Shield: 2019

Toronto FC

- Canadian Championship: 2020 (played 2022)

United States

- CONCACAF Gold Cup: 2007

Individual

- MLS Coach of the Year: 1998, 2006, 2019
- National Soccer Hall of Fame: 2014
- Eliteserien Manager of the Year: 2015
