= 2025 Nashville SC season =

Nashville SC
2025 season
- General manager: Mike Jacobs
- Head coach: B. J. Callaghan
- Stadium: Geodis Park
- MLS: Conference: 6th Overall: 11th
- MLS Cup playoffs: Round one
- U.S. Open Cup: Winners
- Top goalscorer: League: Sam Surridge (24); All: Sam Surridge (31)
- Average home league attendance: 25,618
Home colors	Away colors	Third colors

The 2025 season was the sixth season for Nashville SC as a member of Major League Soccer (MLS), the top flight of professional soccer in the United States. It was their eighth overall season, including two years in the second-division USL Championship.

It was the first full season for head coach B.J. Callaghan, who took over the position in July 2024. The team finished the 2024 season with a 9–9–16 record, their worst in their MLS history, and did not qualify for the MLS Cup playoffs. During the offseason, several long-time players were released from their contracts or traded away, including Aníbal Godoy and Brian Anunga—both of whom joined for the inaugural MLS season in 2020. Nashville SC played 34 matches during the 2025 MLS regular season from February to October; matches were paused from June 14 to 25 during the 2025 FIFA Club World Cup and 2025 CONCACAF Gold Cup, both of which were hosted in the United States.

== Preseason ==
January 18 Preseason	Nashville SC	3–0	United States U-20	Palm Beach Gardens, Florida
10:00 CDT	Mukhtar 7'; Pacius 50'; Sipic 53'	Report

January 24 Preseason	Nashville SC	0–0	Charlotte FC	Palm Beach Gardens, Florida
12:30 CDT		Report

February 1 Preseason	Nashville SC	3–0	Lexington SC	Nashville, Tennessee
14:00 CDT	Surridge 17', 26', 45'	Report		Stadium: Geodis Park

February 12 Preseason	Nashville SC	4–1	D.C. United	Palm Beach Gardens, Florida
10:00 CDT	Tasgeth 7'; Washington 85'; Bauer 95'; Jones 105'	Report	Hosei Kijima 37'

February 15 Preseason	Nashville SC	2–1	Austin FC	Austin, Texas
14:00 CDT	Bukari 12', 69'	Report	Muyl 17'	Stadium: Q2 Stadium

== Friendlies ==
August 2 Friendly	Nashville SC	2–2	Aston Villa F.C.	Nashville, Tennessee
19:00 CDT	Corcoran 76'; Bauer (yellow card) 82'; Surridge 85'	Report	Watkins 18'; Kamara (yellow card) 32'; Malen 64'	Stadium: Geodis Park; Attendance: 20,905

== Competitions ==
=== Overview ===
Competition	First match	Last match	Starting round	Final position	Record							
Competition	First match	Last match	Starting round	Final position	Pld	W	D	L	GF	GA	GD	Win %
Major League Soccer	February 22	October 18	Matchday 1	11th (6th Conf)	34	16	6	12	58	45	+13	47.06
MLS Cup playoffs	October 24	November 8	Round one	Round one	3	1	0	2	3	8	−5	33.33
U.S. Open Cup	May 6	October 1	Round of 32	Winners	5	5	0	0	14	6	+8	100.00
Total					42	22	6	14	75	59	+16	52.38

Source: ESPN

=== Major League Soccer ===
==== Standings ====
===== Eastern Conference =====
MLS Eastern Conference table (2025)
Pos	Team	Pld	W	L	T	GF	GA	GD	Pts	Qualification
4	Charlotte FC	34	19	13	2	55	46	+9	59	Qualification for round one
5	New York City FC	34	17	12	5	50	44	+6	56	Qualification for round one
6	Nashville SC	34	16	12	6	58	45	+13	54	Qualification for round one
7	Columbus Crew	34	14	8	12	55	51	+4	54	Qualification for round one
8	Chicago Fire FC	34	15	11	8	68	60	+8	53	Qualification for the wild-card round

Source: MLS
Rules for classification: 1) points; 2) total wins; 3) total goal differential; 4) total goals scored; 5) fewer disciplinary points; 6) away goal differential; 7) away goals scored; 8) home goals differential; 9) home goals scored; 10) coin toss (2 clubs tied) or drawing of lots (≥3 clubs tied)

===== Overall =====
Overall MLS standings table (2025)
Pos	Team	Pld	W	L	T	GF	GA	GD	Pts	Qualification
9	New York City FC	34	17	12	5	50	44	+6	56	
10	Seattle Sounders FC (L)	34	15	9	10	58	48	+10	55	Qualification for the CONCACAF Champions Cup Round of 16 (Note: As winners of Leagues Cup)
11	Nashville SC (U)	34	16	12	6	58	45	+13	54	Qualification for the CONCACAF Champions Cup Round one (Note: As winners of 2025 U.S. Open Cup)
12	Columbus Crew	34	14	8	12	55	51	+4	54	
13	Chicago Fire FC	34	15	11	8	68	60	+8	53	

Source: MLS
Rules for classification: 1) points; 2) total wins; 3) total goal differential; 4) total goals scored; 5) fewer disciplinary points; 6) away goal differential; 7) away goals scored; 8) home goals differential; 9) home goals scored; 10) coin toss (2 clubs tied) or drawing of lots (≥3 clubs tied)
(L) Leagues Cup winners; (U) U.S. Open Cup winners

==== Match results ====
The MLS regular season schedule was released on December 19, 2024. Nashville SC will play 34 matches—17 at home and 17 away—primarily against opponents from the Eastern Conference. The team will play six matches against teams in the Western Conference.

February 22 1	Nashville SC	0–0	New England Revolution	Nashville, Tennessee
7:30 p.m. CST	Corcoran (yellow card) 64'	Report	Fofana (yellow card) 36'; Yueill (yellow card) 65'	Stadium: Geodis Park; Attendance: 23,494; Referee: Marcos de Oliveira

March 1 2	New York Red Bulls	2–0	Nashville SC	Harrison, New Jersey
6:30 p.m. CST	Sofo 7'; Valencia (yellow card) 12'; Forsberg 30'; Choupo-Moting (yellow card) 57'; Eile (yellow card) 90+3'	Report	Yazbek (yellow card) 59'; Zimmerman (yellow card) 67'	Stadium: Sports Illustrated Stadium; Attendance: 18,843; Referee: Rosendo Mendoza

March 8 3	Nashville SC	2–0	Portland Timbers	Nashville, Tennessee
7:30 p.m. CST	Najar 45+3'; Qasem 68'	Report	McGraw (yellow card) 5'; Ayala (yellow card) 83'	Stadium: Geodis Park; Attendance: 24,432; Referee: Filip Dujic

March 16 4	Philadelphia Union	1–3	Nashville SC	Chester, Pennsylvania
1:00 p.m. CDT	Lukić 33'; Wagner (yellow card) 88'; Damiani (yellow card) 90+3'; Makhanya (red card) 90+12'	Report	Surridge 15'; Qasem 44'; Yazbek (yellow card) 45+2'; Mukhtar 82' (pen.)	Stadium: Subaru Park; Attendance: 18,535; Referee: Pierre-Luc Lauziere

March 22 5	Nashville SC	3–0	CF Montréal	Nashville, Tennessee
7:30 p.m. CDT	Muyl 56'; Bauer 62'; Pérez 67'	Report	Loturi (yellow card) 69'	Stadium: Geodis Park; Attendance: 25,301; Referee: Lorenzo Hernandez

March 29 6	Nashville SC	1–2	FC Cincinnati	Nashville, Tennessee
7:30 p.m. CDT	Bauer 39'; Tagseth (yellow card) 90+2'	Report	Evander 43'; Denkey 90+1' (pen.)	Stadium: Geodis Park; Attendance: 25,640; Referee: Drew Fischer

April 5 7	Charlotte FC	2–1	Nashville SC	Charlotte, North Carolina
1:30 p.m. CDT	Westwood (yellow card) 52'; Vargas (yellow card) 72'; Zaha 85' (pen.); Toklomati 90'; Byrne (yellow card) 90+11'	Report	Najar (yellow card) 13'; Mukhtar 32'; Tagseth (yellow card) 68'	Stadium: Bank of America Stadium; Attendance: 29,591; Referee: Lukasz Szpala

April 12 8	Nashville SC	2–1	Real Salt Lake	Nashville, Tennessee
7:30 p.m. CDT	Mukhtar (yellow card) 22'; Lovitz (yellow card) 26', (goal) 30'; Brugman (yellow card) 47'; Tagseth (yellow card) 61'; Surridge 90+1' (pen.)	Report	Marczuk 12'; Gonçalves (yellow card) 51'; Glad (yellow card) 64'; Ojeda (yellow card) 64'	Stadium: Geodis Park; Attendance: 25,625; Referee: Jair Marrufo

April 19 9	Seattle Sounders FC	3–0	Nashville SC	Seattle, Washington
6:30 p.m. CDT	Musovski 19'; de la Vega 30'; Rothrock 34'; Vargas (yellow card) 37'; Kossa-Rienzi (yellow card) 51'; Kim (yellow card) 56'; João Paulo (yellow card) 82'	Report		Stadium: Lumen Field; Attendance: 31,867; Referee: Ricardo Fierro

April 26 10	Nashville SC	7–2	Chicago Fire FC	Nashville, Tennessee
7:30 p.m. CDT	Surridge 15' (pen.), 45+9' (pen.), 50', 57'; Palacios 23'; Mukhtar 25', 31'	Report	D'Avilla (yellow card) 43'; Brady (yellow card) 45+7'; Zinckernagel (yellow card) 51', (goal) 63'; Elliott (yellow card) 65'; Cuypers 71'	Stadium: Geodis Park; Attendance: 24,771; Referee: Rosendo Mendoza

May 3 11	Atlanta United FC	1–1	Nashville SC	Atlanta, Georgia
1:30 p.m. CDT	Almirón 20', (yellow card) 82'; Klich (yellow card) 43'; Slisz (yellow card) 78'	Report	Lovitz 66'; Pérez (yellow card) 90+4'	Stadium: Mercedes-Benz Stadium; Attendance: 41,893; Referee: Sergii Boiko

May 10 12	Nashville SC	2–1	Charlotte FC	Nashville, Tennessee
7:30 p.m. CDT	Palacios (yellow card) 23'; Lovitz (yellow card) 44'; Mukhtar 49'; Shaffelburg 54'; Yazbek (yellow card) 58'	Report	Abada 48'; Toklomati (yellow card) 72'; Westwood (yellow card) 79'	Stadium: Geodis Park; Attendance: 25,002; Referee: Alexis Da Silva

May 14 13	Nashville SC	2–1	New York Red Bulls	Nashville, Tennessee
7:30 p.m. CDT	Yazbek 34'; Mukhtar 63'; Qasem (yellow card) 80'; Surridge (yellow card) 86'; Lovitz (yellow card) 90+5'	Report	Valencia (yellow card) 36'; Choupo-Moting 56'; Harper (yellow card) 73'; Edwards (yellow card) 83'	Stadium: Geodis Park; Attendance: 22,549; Referee: Marcos de Oliveira

May 17 14	Nashville SC	0–0	D.C. United	Nashville, Tennessee
7:30 p.m. CDT	Yazbek (yellow card) 30'; Surridge (yellow card) 80'	Report	Peltola (yellow card) 24'; Barraza (yellow card) 70'	Stadium: Geodis Park; Attendance: 25,110; Referee: Sergii Demianchuk

May 24 15	Toronto FC	1–2	Nashville SC	Toronto, Ontario
6:30 p.m. CDT	Bernardeschi (yellow card) 86'; Osorio 90+1'; Thompson (yellow card) 90+2'	Report	Surridge 57', 89'	Stadium: BMO Field; Attendance: 19,504; Referee: Armando Villarreal

May 28 16	Columbus Crew	2–2	Nashville SC	Columbus, Ohio
7:00 p.m. CDT	Nagbe (yellow card) 66'; Rossi 69'; Palacios 81' (o.g.); Chambost (yellow card) 90+3'	Report	Surridge 2'; Pérez (yellow card) 54'; Mukhtar 78', (yellow card) 87'; Muyl (yellow card) 90+3'	Stadium: Lower.com Field; Attendance: 20,022; Referee: Victor Rivas

May 31 17	Nashville SC	2–2	New York City FC	Nashville, Tennessee
3:30 p.m. CDT	Surridge 27', 41'; Acosta (yellow card) 84'	Report	O'Neill (yellow card) 40'; Wolf 54', 87'; Tanasijević (yellow card) 75'; Parks (yellow card) 83'	Stadium: Geodis Park; Attendance: 28,351; Referee: Jon Freemon

June 14 18	Chicago Fire FC	0–2	Nashville SC	Chicago, Illinois
7:30 p.m. CDT	Oregel (yellow card) 44'; Gonzalez (yellow card) 63'	Report	Maher (yellow card) 37'; Mukhtar 56'; Brugman (yellow card) 65'; Surridge 75'; Pérez (yellow card) 90'; Tagseth (yellow card) 90+3'; Willis (yellow card) 90+4'	Stadium: Soldier Field; Attendance: 26,942; Referee: Alexis Da Silva

June 25 19	New England Revolution	2–3	Nashville SC	Foxborough, Massachusetts
6:30 p.m. CDT	Chancalay 15'; Urruti (yellow card) 39'; Ceballos 49'; Yusuf (yellow card) 86'	Report	Muyl (yellow card) 21'; Surridge 45+2', 51', 58' (pen.); Tagseth (yellow card) 48'; Pérez (yellow card) 59'	Stadium: Gillette Stadium; Attendance: 16,354; Referee: Lorenzo Hernandez

June 28 20	D.C. United	0–1	Nashville SC	Washington, D.C.
6:30 p.m. CDT	Bartlett (yellow card) 16'; J. Stroud (yellow card) 43'; Pirani (yellow card) 83'	Report	Surridge 18' (pen.); Muyl (yellow card) 53'	Stadium: Audi Field; Attendance: 16,085; Referee: Ricardo Fierro

July 5 21	Nashville SC	1–0	Philadelphia Union	Nashville, Tennessee
7:30 p.m. CDT	Pérez (red card) 63'; Tagseth (yellow card) 89'; Mukhtar 90+11' (pen.)	Report	C. Sullivan (yellow card) 46'; Wagner (yellow card) 71'; Glesnes (yellow card) 73'; Bender (yellow card) 79'	Stadium: Geodis Park; Attendance: 28,896; Referee: Rubiel Vazquez

July 12 22	Inter Miami CF	2–1	Nashville SC	Fort Lauderdale, Florida
6:30 p.m. CDT	Messi 17', 62'; Segovia (yellow card) 52'; Weigandt (yellow card) 87'	Report	Yazbek (yellow card) 24'; Mukhtar 49'; Maher (yellow card) 90+3'	Stadium: Chase Stadium; Attendance: 21,108; Referee: Filip Dujic

July 16 23	Nashville SC	3–0	Columbus Crew	Nashville, Tennessee
7:30 p.m. CDT	Zawadzki 2' (o.g.); Mukhtar 30'; Pérez (yellow card) 49'; Surridge 82'	Report	Arfsten (yellow card) 57'; Gazdag (yellow card) 82'	Stadium: Geodis Park; Attendance: 28,254; Referee: Ricardo Montero

July 19 24	Nashville SC	1–0	Toronto FC	Nashville, Tennessee
7:30 p.m. CDT	Surridge 28'; Zimmerman (yellow card) 60'; Muyl (yellow card) 68'; Mukhtar (yellow card) 80'	Report	Franklin (yellow card) 68'; Long (yellow card) 73'	Stadium: Geodis Park; Attendance: 28,786; Referee: Sergii Boiko

July 25 25	San Diego FC	1–0	Nashville SC	San Diego, California
9:30 p.m. CDT	Lozano 53'; Bombino (yellow card) 71'; Tverskov (yellow card) 88'	Report	Zimmerman (yellow card) 18'; Palacios (yellow card) 32'; Lovitz (yellow card) 69'	Stadium: Snapdragon Stadium; Attendance: 28,114; Referee: Drew Fischer

August 9 26	St. Louis City SC	3−1	Nashville SC	St. Louis, Missouri
7:30 p.m. CDT	Orozco 23'; Klauss 39'; Morales (yellow card) 55'; Jeong Sang-bin 66'; Joyner (yellow card) 90+3'	Report	Mukhtar 85' (pen.); Muyl (yellow card) 90+6'	Stadium: Energizer Park; Attendance: 22,423; Referee: Lorenzo Hernandez

August 17 27	New York City FC	2–1	Nashville SC	New York, New York
4:00 p.m. CDT	Perea 40' (yellow card) 90+4'; Moralez (yellow card) 58'; Martínez 77' (yellow card) 82'	Report	Shaffelburg 10'; Tagseth (yellow card) 48'; Surridge (yellow card) 82'	Stadium: Yankee Stadium; Attendance: 20,077; Referee: Filip Dujic

August 23 28	Nashville SC	5–1	Orlando City SC	Nashville, Tennessee
7:30 p.m. CDT	Surridge 3', 43'; Mukhtar 17', 40'; Qasem (yellow card) 82'; Palacios 90+4'	Report	Smith (yellow card) 50'; Muriel 76', (red card) 81'; Schlegel (yellow card) 90+1'	Stadium: Geodis Park; Attendance: 28,014; Referee: Timothy Ford

August 30 29	Nashville SC	0–1	Atlanta United FC	Nashville, Tennessee
7:30 p.m. CDT	Najar (yellow card) 37'; Palacios (yellow card) 71'	Report	Hernández 24', (yellow card) 58'; Thiaré (yellow card) 43'; Amador (yellow card) 53'; Hibbert (yellow card) 62'; Slisz (yellow card) 76'; Almirón (yellow card) 79'; Miranchuk (yellow card) 90+4'	Stadium: Geodis Park; Attendance: 27,270; Referee: Ismir Pekmic

September 13 30	FC Cincinnati	2–1	Nashville SC	Cincinnati, Ohio
6:30 p.m. CDT	Bucha (yellow card) 48'; Brenner 73', (yellow card) 74'; Evander 90+8'	Report	Surridge 84'	Stadium: TQL Stadium; Attendance: 24,749; Referee: Marcos de Oliveira

September 20 31	Orlando City SC	3–2	Nashville SC	Orlando, Florida
6:30 p.m. CDT	Schlegel (yellow card) 22'; Ojeda 30', 32'; McGuire 90+5'	Report	Mukhtar (yellow card) 28', (goal) 45+1'; Tagseth (yellow card) 45+1'; Shaffelburg 51', (yellow card) 90+3'	Stadium: Inter&Co Stadium; Attendance: 20,516; Referee: Pierre-Luc Lauziere

September 27 32	Nashville SC	3–1	Houston Dynamo FC	Nashville, Tennessee
7:30 p.m. CDT	Mukhtar 2'; Najar (yellow card) 13', (goal) 50'; Yazbek (yellow card) 38'; Surridge 48'	Report	Sviatchenko (red card) 9'; Urso 40'	Stadium: Geodis Park; Attendance: 27,763; Referee: Sergii Boiko

October 4 33	CF Montréal	1–1	Nashville SC	Montreal, Quebec
6:30 p.m. CDT	Sealy 9'; Jamie (yellow card) 64'	Report	Maher (yellow card) 8'; Lovitz (yellow card) 69'; Nájar (yellow card) 73'; Surridge 81'	Stadium: Saputo Stadium; Attendance: 16,244; Referee: Fotis Bazakos

October 18 34	Nashville SC	2–5	Inter Miami CF	Nashville, Tennessee
5:00 p.m. CDT	Surridge 43'; Shaffelburg 45+6'; Mukhtar (yellow card) 64'		Allende (yellow card) 22'; Messi 34', 63' (pen.), 81'; Rodríguez 67'; De Paul (yellow card) 68'; Segovia 90+1'	Stadium: Geodis Park; Referee: Jon Freemon

=== MLS Cup playoffs ===
==== Round one ====
October 24 Match 1	Inter Miami CF	3–1	Nashville SC	Fort Lauderdale, Florida
7:00 pm CDT	Messi 19', 90+6'; Busquets (yellow card) 54'; De Paul (yellow card) 56'; Allende 62'	Report	Surridge (yellow card) 56'; Mukhtar 90+11'	Stadium: Chase Stadium; Attendance: 21,550; Referee: Filip Dujic

November 1 Match 2	Nashville SC	2–1	Inter Miami CF	Nashville, Tennessee
6:30 pm CDT	Tagseth (yellow card) 4'; Surridge 9' (pen.), (yellow card) 78'; Yazbek (yellow card) 15'; Bauer 45'; Shaffelburg (yellow card) 84'; Acosta (yellow card) 90+6'	Report	Messi 90'	Stadium: Geodis Park; Attendance: 30,109; Referee: Allen Chapman

November 8 Match 3	Inter Miami CF	4–0	Nashville SC	Fort Lauderdale, Florida
7:00 pm CST	Messi 10', 39', (yellow card) 77'; Baltasar Rodríguez (yellow card) 34'; De Paul (yellow card) 43'; Silvetti (yellow card) 69'; Allende 73', 76'	Report	Zimmerman (yellow card) 45+1'; Maher (yellow card) 67'; Bunbury (yellow card) 79'; Lovitz (yellow card) 80'	Stadium: Chase Stadium; Attendance: 19,049; Referee: Rosendo Mendoza

=== U.S. Open Cup ===
May 6 Round of 32	Nashville SC (Tennessee)	1–0	(Tennessee) Chattanooga Red Wolves SC	Nashville, Tennessee
7:00 p.m. CDT	Bauer 18'; Acosta (yellow card) 58'	Report	Ualefi (yellow card) 32'; Green (yellow card) 58'; Alhassan (yellow card) 65' (red card) 80'; Bentley (yellow card) 84'; Knapp (yellow card) 87'	Stadium: Geodis Park; Attendance: 18,544; Referee: Jeremy Scheer

May 21 Round of 16	Orlando City SC (Florida)	2–3	(Tennessee) Nashville SC	Orlando, Florida
6:30 p.m. CDT	Pašalić 17'; Enrique 58'; Freeman (yellow card) 72'	Report	Schlegel 23' (o.g.); Qasem 41'; Yazbek (yellow card) 57'; Corcoran (yellow card) 69'; Meyer 79'	Stadium: Inter&Co Stadium; Referee: Joshua Encarnación

July 9 Quarterfinals	Nashville SC (Tennessee)	5–2	(Washington, D.C.) D.C. United	Nashville, Tennessee
8:00 p.m. CDT	Pérez 25'; Surridge 53' (pen.), 72'; Tagseth (yellow card) 56'; Najar 81'; Zimmerman 87'	Report	Pirani 5'; Maher 24' (o.g.); Schnegg (yellow card) 49'	Stadium: Geodis Park; Attendance: 21,238; Referee: Greg Dopka

September 16 Semifinals	Nashville SC (Tennessee)	3–1	(Pennsylvania) Philadelphia Union	Nashville, Tennessee
7:30 p.m. CDT	Surridge 36', 50', 85'; Lovitz (yellow card) 75'; Mukhtar (yellow card) 78'	Report	Damiani (yellow card) 5'; Westfield (yellow card) 21'; Makhanya (yellow card) 37'; Iloski (yellow card) 62'; Wagner (yellow card) 66'; Q. Sullivan 70'	Stadium: Geodis Park; Attendance: 24,432; Referee: Victor Rivas

October 1 Final	Austin FC (Texas)	1–2	(Tennessee) Nashville SC	Austin, Texas
7:00 p.m. CDT	Pereira (yellow card) 30'; Uzuni 45+1'; Sánchez (yellow card) 52'; Cascante (yellow card) 61'; Wolff (yellow card) 90+3'	Report	Mukhtar 17'; Surridge 60' (pen.), (yellow card) 90+3' (yellow-red card) 90+6'; Maher (yellow card) 66'; Bauer (yellow card) 85'	Stadium: Q2 Stadium; Attendance: 20,738; Referee: Tori Penso

== Roster ==
As of April 1, 2025

Note: Flags indicate national team as defined under FIFA eligibility rules; some limited exceptions apply. Players may hold more than one non-FIFA nationality.

No.	Pos.	Nation	Player
1	GK	USA	Joe Willis
2	DF	USA	Dan Lovitz
4	DF	COL	Jeisson Palacios
5	DF	USA	Jack Maher
6	MF	HON	Bryan Acosta
7	MF	URU	Gastón Brugman
8	MF	AUS	Patrick Yazbek
9	FW	ENG	Sam Surridge
10	MF	GER	Hany Mukhtar
11	FW	USA	Tyler Boyd
12	FW	USA	Teal Bunbury
13	GK	DOM	Xavier Valdez
14	MF	CAN	Jacob Shaffelburg
16	MF	USA	Matthew Corcoran
19	MF	USA	Alex Muyl

No.	Pos.	Nation	Player
20	MF	NOR	Edvard Tagseth
21	FW	USA	Maximus Ekk
22	DF	USA	Josh Bauer
23	DF	USA	Taylor Washington
25	DF	USA	Walker Zimmerman
28	DF	USA	Wyatt Meyer
29	DF	USA	Julian Gaines
31	DF	HON	Andy Najar
33	DF	USA	Christopher Applewhite
37	MF	SWE	Ahmed Qasem
47	MF	SLE	Isaiah Jones
77	FW	USA	Adem Sipić
99	GK	USA	Brian Schwake
