= 2025 U.S. Open Cup final =

Final match in U.S. soccer tournament

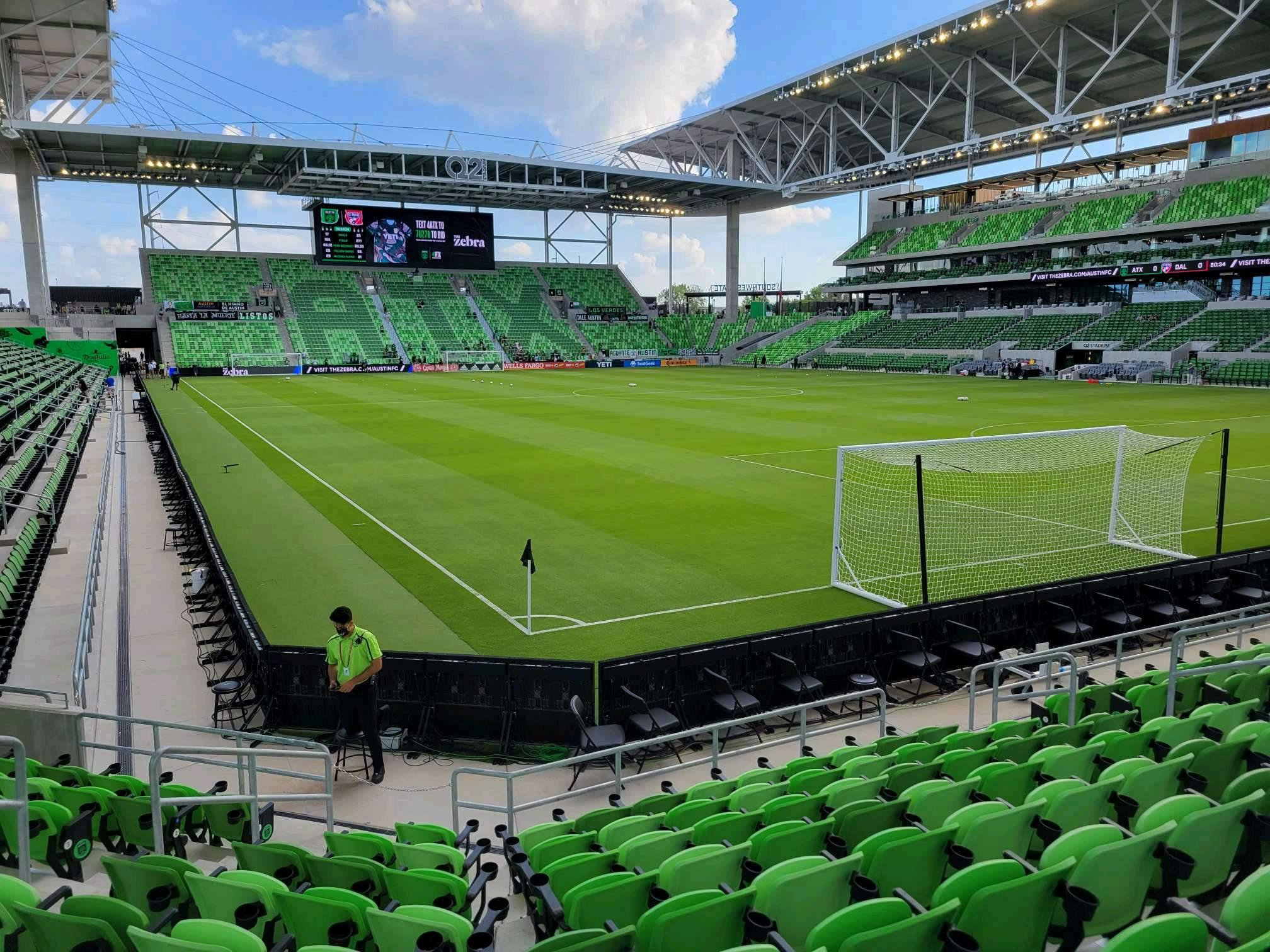
- The match was played at Q2 Stadium in Austin, Texas
- Event: 2025 U.S. Open Cup
Austin FC	Nashville SC
MLS	MLS
1	2
- Date: October 1, 2025
- Venue: Q2 Stadium, Austin, Texas, U.S.
- Referee: Tori Penso
- Attendance: 20,738
- Weather: Sunny, 93 °F (34 °C)

The 2025 Lamar Hunt U.S. Open Cup final was a soccer match played on October 1, 2025. It was contested by Austin FC against Nashville SC at Q2 Stadium in Austin, Texas. The match determined the winner of the 110th edition of the Lamar Hunt U.S. Open Cup, the oldest cup competition in U.S. soccer. The tournament is open to amateur and professional soccer teams affiliated with the United States Soccer Federation.

Nashville SC won 2–1 in the final with goals from Hany Mukhtar and Sam Surridge. It was the first sports championship for a major professional team from the state of Tennessee. As the winner, Nashville SC qualified for the 2026 CONCACAF Champions Cup. The match was broadcast on the CBS Sports Network and Paramount+ in the United States.

== Road to the final ==
The Lamar Hunt U.S. Open Cup is an annual men's soccer competition open to adult teams in the United States that are affiliated with the United States Soccer Federation. The 110th edition in 2025 had 96 participants, among which were professional and amateur teams. Professional leagues entered in later rounds, with 16 Major League Soccer (MLS) teams beginning in the round of 32. The MLS participants were determined by the 2024 regular season standings; teams that had not qualified for the 2025 CONCACAF Champions Cup or 2025 Leagues Cup were eligible. The tournament was organized into geographic brackets beginning in the round of 16, with teams broadly divided into eastern and western groups in the quarterfinals draw. The winner of the western group was designated as the host for the U.S. Open Cup final.

The finalists, Austin FC and Nashville SC, were both in their first U.S. Open Cup final and had yet to win a major domestic trophy. The two teams previously played each other in four MLS regular season matches that finished in two wins for Nashville, one win for Austin, and one draw. The most recent match was in August 2024, a 2–0 win for Austin FC at home.

=== Austin FC ===
Austin FC results in 2025 U.S. Open Cup
Round	Opponent	Score
R32	El Paso Locomotive FC (H)	3–2
R16	Houston Dynamo FC (H)	3–1
QF	San Jose Earthquakes (A)	2–2 (a.e.t.); 4–2 (p)
SF	Minnesota United FC (A)	2–1 (a.e.t.)
Key: (H) = Home; (A) = Away

Austin FC entered MLS as an expansion team in the 2021 season and participated in their first U.S. Open Cup the following year. Their best previous performance was in the round of 16 in the 2023 edition; they were represented by reserve team Austin FC II in the 2024 edition. Austin FC entered the 2025 tournament in the round of 32 and hosted El Paso Locomotive FC, a second-division team from the USL Championship, and conceded two goals in the first half. Brandon Vázquez scored twice to lead the hosts to a 3–2 comeback victory and secure the team's first win in U.S. Open Cup play.

The team hosted fellow Texan MLS team Houston Dynamo FC in the round of 16 and earned a 3–1 win through a goal and assist from Osman Bukari. Austin FC then defeated the San Jose Earthquakes in the quarterfinals after conceding a goal in the first half. They earned a penalty kick that was converted by Vázquez in the 65th minute to tie the match through the end of regulation time. The Earthquakes then lost captain Cristian Espinoza to a knee injury after a collision with Austin defender Mikkel Desler in extra time, but retook the lead through Benji Kikanović in the 99th minute. They conceded another penalty kick to Austin that was converted by Myrto Uzuni to tie the match at 2–2 at the end of extra time. In the ensuing penalty shootout, Austin FC converted all of their kicks to win 4–2 and advance.

Austin FC traveled north for their semifinal match against Minnesota United FC, who had one available striker on their roster due to injuries and tournament cap restrictions. Bukari scored on a long run at the end of the first half, but Minnesota equalized through a free kick from 25 yards (23 m) taken by Joaquín Pereyra in the 67th minute. The match remained tied through most of extra time until the final ten seconds, when CJ Fodrey scored from a rebound off a save by goalkeeper Dayne St. Clair.

=== Nashville SC ===
Nashville SC results in 2025 U.S. Open Cup
Round	Opponent	Score
R32	Chattanooga Red Wolves SC (H)	1–0
R16	Orlando City SC (A)	3–2
QF	D.C. United (H)	5–2
SF	Philadelphia Union (H)	3–1
Key: (H) = Home; (A) = Away

Nashville SC was originally a team in the USL Championship, the second-division league in the United States, from 2018 to 2019 and joined MLS as an expansion team in 2020. The team had reached the round of 16 in the 2018 U.S. Open Cup while in the USL Championship and the quarterfinals of the 2022 edition, where they lost to Orlando City SC in a penalty shootout. Their only previous experience in a tournament final was finishing as runners-up to Inter Miami CF in the 2023 Leagues Cup final, which they had hosted at Geodis Park in Nashville, Tennessee.

Nashville opened their 2025 campaign in the round of 32 at home against Chattanooga Red Wolves SC, a third-tier team from USL League One, and defeated them 1–0 with a goal scored by Josh Bauer in the first half. The team traveled to Florida for their round of 16 match against Orlando City SC, who took the lead in the 17th minute with Marco Pašalić's strike from outside the box. Nashville took the lead before halftime through an own goal and later a low shot from Ahmed Qasem that rolled into the net. Ramiro Enrique's goal for the hosts in the 58th minute equalized the score until rookie defender Wyatt Meyer scored from 25 yards (23 m) in the 79th minute off a backheel assist from Patrick Yazbek for the 3–2 Nashville victory.

The team then hosted D.C. United in the quarterfinal and conceded twice in the opening 24 minutes—from a long-distance strike by Gabriel Pirani and an own goal directed in by Jack Maher. Nashville responded a minute later with a goal after a D.C. defensive mistake and equalized through a penalty kick converted by Sam Surridge in the 53rd minute. Surridge added his second goal and was followed by a 24-yard (22 m) strike from Andy Najar and a Walker Zimmerman header to secure a 5–2 win. Nashville hosted the eastern semifinal match against the Philadelphia Union and won 3–1 through Surridge's hat-trick with goals in both halves.

== Broadcasting ==
The U.S. Open Cup final was broadcast in the United States on the CBS Sports Network and streamed on Paramount+. Radio broadcasts were available in the Austin, Texas, market on Alt 97.5 in English and TUDN Radio Austin in Spanish. Nashville SC hosted a watch party outside their home stadium, Geodis Park, for the final.

== Match ==
=== Summary ===
The all-women officiating crew, the first in the tournament's 111-year history, was led by center referee Tori Penso. Penso, along with assistant referees Brooke Mayo and Kathryn Nesbitt, had previously worked together at the 2023 FIFA Women's World Cup and two editions of the FIFA Club World Cup.

=== Details ===
October 1, 2025
7:00 p.m. CDT

Austin FC (Texas)	1–2	(Tennessee) Nashville SC
Uzuni 45+1'	Report	Mukhtar 17'; Surridge 60' (pen.)

Q2 Stadium, Austin, Texas
Attendance: 20,738
Referee: Tori Penso

Austin FC	Nashville SC

GK	1	(United States) Brad Stuver
DF	3	(Denmark) Mikkel Desler		(substituted off) 84'
DF	18	(Costa Rica) Julio Cascante	(yellow card) 61'
DF	4	(United States) Brendan Hines-Ike
DF	29	(Brazil) Guilherme Biro
MF	11	(Ghana) Osman Bukari
MF	6	(Spain) Ilie Sánchez (c)	(yellow card) 52'	(substituted off) 85'
MF	8	(Venezuela) Daniel Pereira	(yellow card) 30'
MF	33	(United States) Owen Wolff	(yellow card) 90+3'
FW	21	(Chile) Diego Rubio		(substituted off) 77'
FW	10	(Albania) Myrto Uzuni
Substitutes:
GK	30	(United States) Stefan Cleveland
DF	5	(Ukraine) Oleksandr Svatok
DF	17	(Republic of Ireland) Jon Gallagher		(substituted on) 84'
MF	7	(Colombia) Jáder Obrian		(substituted on) 85'
MF	14	(Sweden) Besard Šabović
MF	20	(Argentina) Nicolás Dubersarsky
FW	19	(United States) CJ Fodrey		(substituted on) 99'
Manager:
(Spain) Nico Estévez

GK	99	(United States) Brian Schwake
DF	2	(United States) Daniel Lovitz
DF	5	(United States) Jack Maher	(yellow card) 66'
DF	4	(Colombia) Jeisson Palacios		(substituted off) 68'
DF	31	(Honduras) Andy Najar		(substituted off) 68'
MF	8	(Australia) Patrick Yazbek		(substituted off) 80'
MF	19	(United States) Alex Muyl
MF	20	(Norway) Edvard Tagseth
FW	14	(Canada) Jacob Shaffelburg
FW	10	(Germany) Hany Mukhtar (c)		(substituted off) 90+5'
FW	9	(England) Sam Surridge	(yellow card) 90+3' (yellow-red card) 90+6'
Substitutes:
GK	13	(Dominican Republic) Xavier Valdez
DF	22	(United States) Josh Bauer	(yellow card) 85'	(substituted on) 68'
DF	25	(United States) Walker Zimmerman		(substituted on) 68'
MF	6	(Honduras) Bryan Acosta		(substituted on) 80'
MF	7	(Uruguay) Gastón Brugman		(substituted on) 80'
MF	11	(United States) Tyler Boyd
MF	12	(United States) Teal Bunbury		(substituted on) 90+5'
Manager:
(United States) B. J. Callaghan

Assistant referees:
Brooke Mayo
Kathryn Nesbitt
Fourth official:
Rosendo Mendoza
Reserve assistant referee:
Meghan Mullen
Video assistant referee:
Shawn Tehini
Assistant video assistant referee:
Fabio Tovar

Team stats
Statistics	Austin	Nashville
Goals	1	2
Shots	16	7
Shots on target	8	2
Saves	0	7
Ball possession	54%	46%
Corners	6	4
Fouls	10	15
Offsides	1	2
Cautions	4	2
Ejections	0	0
References: U.S. Soccer and ESPN

Scoring summary
Team	No.	Scorer (Assists)	Minute	Score
NSH	10	Hany Mukhtar (Jacob Shaffelburg)	17	1–0 NSH
ATX	10	Myrto Uzuni (Ilie Sánchez)	45+1	1–1
NSH	9	Sam Surridge (Penalty)	60	2–1 NSH

Misconducts: 8 cautions
Team	Player (type)	Minute
ATX	Dani Pereira (Caution)	30
ATX	Ilie Sanchez (Caution)	52
ATX	Julio Cascante (Caution)	61
NSH	Jack Maher (Caution)	66
NSH	Josh Bauer (Caution)	85
ATX	Owen Wolff (Caution)	90+3
NSH	Sam Surridge (Caution)	90+3
NSH	Sam Surridge (Ejection, Second caution)	90+6

== Post-match ==
The U.S. Open Cup is the first trophy to be won by Nashville SC and the first for a major professional sports team from the state of Tennessee. Austin FC head coach Nico Estévez criticized the call that led to the match-winning penalty kick but congratulated Nashville.
