= 2021 Nashville SC season =

Nashville SC
2021 season
- General manager: Mike Jacobs
- Head coach: Gary Smith
- Stadium: Nissan Stadium
- MLS: Conference: 3rd
- MLS Cup Playoffs: Conference Semi-finals
- U.S. Open Cup: Canceled
- Top goalscorer: League: Hany Mukhtar (16); All: Hany Mukhtar (19)
- Highest home attendance: 23,832 (7/24 v. CIN)
- Lowest home attendance: 12,164 (4/24 v. CHI)
- Average home league attendance: 18,882
- Biggest win: NAS 5–1 CHI (7/17)
- Biggest defeat: RBNY 2–0 NAS (6/18)
Home colors	Away colors

The 2021 Nashville SC season was the club's second season as a member of Major League Soccer. This was the club's last season in the Eastern Conference after being added to the Conference in 2020 after the MLS is Back Tournament as the club returns to the Western Conference the following season in 2022 due to the addition of Charlotte FC.

== Club ==
=== Current roster ===
As of September 23, 2021

Squad no.	Name	Nationality	Position(s)	Date of birth (age)	Previous club	Apps	Goals
Goalkeepers
1	Joe Willis	(United States)	GK	August 10, 1988 (age 37)	(United States) Houston Dynamo FC	51	0
35	Bryan Meredith	(United States)	GK	August 2, 1989 (age 36)	(United States) Vancouver Whitecaps FC	0	0
—	Tor Saunders	(United States)	GK	April 30, 1998 (age 27)	(United States) Coastal Carolina	0	0
Defenders
2	Daniel Lovitz	(United States)	DF	August 27, 1991 (age 34)	(Canada) CF Montréal	46	1
3	Jalil Anibaba	(United States)	DF	October 19, 1988 (age 37)	(United States) New England Revolution	22	1
4	Dave Romney	(United States)	DF	June 12, 1993 (age 32)	(United States) LA Galaxy	51	1
5	Jack Maher (GA)	(United States)	DF	October 28, 1999 (age 26)	(United States) Indiana University	15	1
12	Alistair Johnston	(Canada)	DF	October 8, 1998 (age 27)	(United States) Wake Forest University	39	1
15	Eric Miller	(United States)	DF	January 15, 1993 (age 33)	(United States) New York City FC	14	0
18	Dylan Nealis	(United States)	DF	July 30, 1998 (age 27)	(United States) Inter Miami CF	3	0
23	Taylor Washington	(United States)	DF	August 16, 1993 (age 32)	(United States) Nashville SC (USL)	29	0
24	Robert Castellanos	(United States)	DF	May 11, 1998 (age 27)	(United States) Rio Grande Valley FC	1	1
25	Walker Zimmerman	(United States)	DF	May 19, 1993 (age 32)	(United States) Los Angeles FC	41	5
Midfielders
6	Dax McCarty (C)	(United States)	MF	April 30, 1987 (age 38)	(United States) Chicago Fire FC	46	2
8	Randall Leal (INTL)	(Costa Rica)	MF	January 14, 1997 (age 29)	(Costa Rica) Deportivo Saprissa	47	9
10	Hany Mukhtar (DP)	(Germany)	MF	March 21, 1995 (age 30)	(Denmark) Brøndby IF	42	17
19	Alex Muyl (HG)	(United States)	MF	September 30, 1995 (age 30)	(United States) New York Red Bulls	46	3
20	Aníbal Godoy	(Panama)	MF	February 10, 1990 (age 36)	(United States) San Jose Earthquakes	39	1
22	Matt LaGrassa	(United States)	MF	January 27, 1993 (age 33)	(United States) Nashville SC (USL)	20	0
26	Luke Haakenson	(United States)	MF	September 10, 1997 (age 28)	(United States) Creighton University	13	2
27	Tah Brian Anunga	(Cameroon)	MF	August 10, 1996 (age 29)	(United States) Charleston Battery	34	1
Forwards
7	Abu Danladi	(Ghana)	FW	October 18, 1995 (age 30)	(United States) Minnesota United FC	24	3
11	Rodrigo Piñeiro (INTL)	(Uruguay)	FW	May 5, 1999 (age 26)	(Uruguay) Danubio F.C.	2	0
14	Daniel Rios	(Mexico)	FW	February 22, 1995 (age 31)	(United States) Nashville SC (USL)	28	6
17	C. J. Sapong	(United States)	FW	December 27, 1988 (age 37)	(United States) Chicago Fire FC	25	10
70	Handwalla Bwana (HG)	(Kenya)	FW	June 25, 1999 (age 26)	(United States) Seattle Sounders FC	8	0
72	Aké Loba (DP, INTL)	(Ivory Coast)	FW	April 1, 1998 (age 27)	(Mexico) C.F. Monterrey	12	0
99	Jhonder Cádiz (DP, INTL)	(Venezuela)	FW	July 25, 1995 (age 30)	(France) Dijon FCO	27	4

== Roster transactions ==
=== In ===
#	Pos.	Player	Signed from	Details	Date	Source
26	MF	(United States) Luke Haakenson	(United States) Charlotte Independence	Loan period ended, option exercised	December 2, 2020	
11	MF	(Uruguay) Rodrigo Piñeiro	(Uruguay) Danubio F.C.	Guaranteed contract through 2023	February 3, 2021	
17	FW	(United States) C. J. Sapong	Free Agent	Two year contract with a third year option	February 10, 2021	
24	DF	(United States) Robert Castellanos	Free Agent	Free transfer	February 17, 2021	
31	DF	(United States) Nick Hinds	(United States) Seattle Sounders FC	Traded for $50,000 in GAM	February 22, 2021	
35	GK	(United States) Bryan Meredith	Free Agent	Free transfer	February 24, 2021	
15	DF	(United States) Eric Miller	(United States) Nashville SC	Contract extension through the 2021 MLS season, with an option for 2022	March 8, 2021	
14	FW	(Mexico) Daniel Ríos	(United States) Nashville SC	Contract extension through the 2022 MLS season, with an option for 2023	March 15, 2021	
18	DF	(United States) Dylan Nealis	(United States) Inter Miami CF	Traded for $175,000 in GAM and an additional $50,000 in GAM conditionally	April 10, 2021	
5	DF	(United States) Jack Maher	(United States) San Diego Loyal SC	Loan agreement terminated	June 23, 2021	
99	FW	(Venezuela) Jhonder Cádiz	(Portugal) S.L. Benfica	Loan extended through the end of the 2021 MLS season	June 28, 2021	
72	FW	(Ivory Coast) Aké Loba	(Mexico) C.F. Monterrey	Signed through 2023, with option for 2024	July 7, 2021	

=== Out ===
#	Pos.	Player	Signed by	Details	Date	Source
55	DF	(Honduras) Brayan Beckeles	Free Agent	Option declined	December 2, 2020	
24	DF	(United States) Tanner Dieterich	Free Agent	Option declined	December 2, 2020	
16	DF	(United States) Ken Tribbett	Free Agent	Option declined	December 2, 2020	
19	FW	(United States) Alan Winn	Free Agent	Option declined	December 2, 2020	
31	GK	(United States) Brady Scott	(United States) Austin FC	Selected in the 2020 MLS Expansion Draft	December 15, 2020	
21	DF	(United States) Derrick Jones	(United States) Houston Dynamo FC	Traded for $250,000 in GAM	January 21, 2021	
5	DF	(Colombia) Miguel Nazarit	(Colombia) Independiente Santa Fe	Loan for the 2021 Categoría Primera A season	January 22, 2021	
11	FW	(Ghana) David Accam	(Sweden) Hammarby	Loan for 12 months with the option to transfer	January 27, 2021	
31	DF	(United States) Nick Hinds	(United States) Austin Bold FC	Loan for the 2021 USL Championship season	May 6, 2021	
35	GK	(United States) Elliot Panicco	(United States) Austin Bold FC	Loan for the 2021 USL Championship season	May 6, 2021	
5	DF	(United States) Jack Maher	(United States) San Diego Loyal SC	Loan for the 2021 USL Championship season	May 28, 2021	
—	DF	(United States) Tom Judge	(United States) Pittsburgh Riverhounds SC	Loan for the 2021 USL Championship season	July 6, 2021	
9	FW	(Senegal) Dominique Badji	(United States) Colorado Rapids	Traded for up to $100,000 in GAM	July 29, 2021	
13	MW	(Tanzania) Irakoze Donasiyano	(United States) OKC Energy FC	Loan for the 2021 USL Championship season	August 14, 2021	

=== SuperDraft picks ===
Round	Position	Player	College	Reference
1 (20)	MF	(Tanzania) Irakoze Donasiyano	Virginia	
2 (36)	DF	(United States) Tom Judge	James Madison	
3 (73)	DF	(Norway) Sondre Norheim	Syracuse	
3 (74)	GK	(United States) Tor Saunders	Coastal Carolina	
4 (86)	FW	(Kenya) Leroy Enzugusi	Drake	

Signed to 2021 season roster

== Non-competitive ==
=== Preseason ===
March 20	Nashville SC	4–0	Louisville City	Brentwood, Tennessee
15:30 CST	Sapong 7' (Mukhtar); Mukhtar 17' (pen.), 19' (Godoy); Trialist 58' (Haakenson)	NSH Report; LOU Report		Stadium: Jeffrey Kuhn Field at Currey Ingram Academy
Note: Played in three 30-minute periods.

March 24	Nashville SC	—	New York Red Bulls	Bradenton, Florida
14:00 CST		Report		Stadium: IMG Academy
Note: Cancelled due to COVID-19 concerns.

March 27	New York City FC	—	Nashville SC	St. Petersburg, Florida
12:00 CST		Report		Stadium: Al Lang Stadium
Note: Cancelled due to health and safety concerns.

March 31	Nashville SC	1–0	Tampa Bay Rowdies	Bradenton, Florida
18:00 CST	Unsigned Player 22'	Report		Stadium: IMG Academy

April 3	Inter Miami CF	—	Nashville SC	Bradenton, Florida
12:30 CST		Report		Stadium: IMG Academy
Note: Cancelled due to health and safety concerns.

April 10	Nashville SC	—	Birmingham Legion	Nashville, Tennessee
TBA		Report		Stadium: Nissan Stadium
Note: Cancelled due to transportation difficulties.

== Major League Soccer season ==
=== Eastern Conference ===
Pos	Team	Pld	W	L	T	GF	GA	GD	Pts	Qualification
1	New England Revolution	34	22	5	7	65	41	+24	73	MLS Cup Conference Semifinals
2	Philadelphia Union	34	14	8	12	48	35	+13	54	MLS Cup First Round
3	Nashville SC	34	12	4	18	55	33	+22	54	MLS Cup First Round
4	New York City FC	34	14	11	9	56	36	+20	51	MLS Cup First Round
5	Atlanta United FC	34	13	9	12	45	37	+8	51	MLS Cup First Round
6	Orlando City SC	34	13	9	12	50	48	+2	51	MLS Cup First Round
7	New York Red Bulls	34	13	12	9	39	33	+6	48	MLS Cup First Round
8	D.C. United	34	14	15	5	56	54	+2	47	
9	Columbus Crew	34	13	13	8	46	45	+1	47	
10	CF Montréal	34	12	12	10	46	44	+2	46	
11	Inter Miami CF	34	12	17	5	36	53	−17	41	
12	Chicago Fire FC	34	9	18	7	36	54	−18	34	
13	Toronto FC	34	6	18	10	39	66	−27	28	
14	FC Cincinnati	34	4	22	8	37	74	−37	20	

Source: MLS
Rules for classification: 1) points; 2) total wins; 3) total goal differential; 4) total goals scored; 5) fewer disciplinary points; 6) away goal differential; 7) away goals scored; 8) home goals differential; 9) home goals scored; 10) coin toss (2 clubs tied) or drawing of lots (≥3 clubs tied)

=== Overall ===
Pos	Team	Pld	W	L	T	GF	GA	GD	Pts	Qualification
5	Portland Timbers	34	17	13	4	56	52	+4	55	
6	Philadelphia Union	34	14	8	12	48	35	+13	54	
7	Nashville SC	34	12	4	18	55	33	+22	54	
8	New York City FC (C)	34	14	11	9	56	36	+20	51	CONCACAF Champions League
9	Atlanta United FC	34	13	9	12	45	37	+8	51	

Source: MLS
Rules for classification: 1) points; 2) total wins; 3) total goal differential; 4) total goals scored; 5) fewer disciplinary points; 6) away goal differential; 7) away goals scored; 8) home goals differential; 9) home goals scored; 10) coin toss (2 clubs tied) or drawing of lots (≥3 clubs tied)
(C) MLS Cup champions

=== Results summary ===
Overall								Home						Away					
Pld	W	D	L	GF	GA	GD	Pts	W	D	L	GF	GA	GD	W	D	L	GF	GA	GD
7	1	5	1	7	8	−1	8	1	3	0	5	4	+1	0	2	1	2	4	−2

=== Matches ===
April 17 1	Nashville SC	2–2	FC Cincinnati	Nashville, TN
7:30 p.m. CDT	Muyl (yellow card) 18'; Cádiz 20'; Leal 64'; Johnston (yellow card) 66'	Report	Acosta 8'; Brenner 12' (pen.); Mokotjo (yellow card) 38'; Stanko (yellow card) 77'	Stadium: Nissan Stadium; Referee: Rubiel Vazquez

April 24 2	Nashville SC	2–2	CF Montréal	Nashville, TN
1:00 p.m. CDT	Godoy (yellow card) 50'; Cádiz 54'; Muyl (yellow card) 56'; Mukhtar 77'	Report	Piette (yellow card) 2'; Toye 13'; Brault-Guillard 42'; Quioto (yellow card) 48'; Struna (yellow card) 63'	Stadium: Nissan Stadium; Attendance: 12,164; Referee: Nima Saghafi

May 2 3	Nashville SC	0–0	Inter Miami CF	Nashville, TN
12:00 p.m. CDT	Godoy (yellow card) 24'; Zimmerman (yellow card) 70'	Report	Gregore (yellow card) 65'	Stadium: Nissan Stadium; Attendance: 13,855; Referee: Rosendo Mendoza

May 8 4	Nashville SC	2–0	New England Revolution	Nashville, TN
12:30 p.m. CDT	Sapong 25'; Lovitz (yellow card) 28'; Muyl 75'; Godoy (yellow card) 90+3'	Report	Jones (yellow card) 57'	Stadium: Nissan Stadium; Attendance: 12,510; Referee: Victor Rivas

May 15 5	Real Salt Lake	0–0	Nashville SC	Sandy, UT
8:30 p.m. CDT	Glad (yellow card) 27'	Report	Muyl (yellow card) 50'	Stadium: Rio Tinto Stadium; Attendance: 10,555; Referee: Marcos DeOliviera

May 23 6	Nashville SC	1–0	Austin FC	Nashville, Tennessee
8:00 p.m. CDT	Leal 35'	Report	Pereira (yellow card) 69'	Stadium: Nissan Stadium; Attendance: 22,421; Referee: Chris Penso

May 29 7	Atlanta United FC	2–2	Nashville SC	Atlanta, Georgia
2:30 p.m. CDT	Moreno 6', (yellow card) 41'; López 51'	Report	McCarty (yellow card) 57'; Lovitz (yellow card) 60'; Mukhtar 80', 83'; Haakenson (yellow card) 90+2'	Stadium: Mercedes-Benz Stadium; Attendance: 40,748; Referee: Alan Kelly

June 18 8	New York Red Bulls	2–0	Nashville SC	Harrison, New Jersey
7:00 p.m. CDT	Fábio 37'; Duncan 56' (yellow card) 71'; Klimala (yellow card) 58'	Report		Stadium: Red Bull Arena; Attendance: 10,173; Referee: Nima Saghafi

June 23 9	Nashville SC	3–2	Toronto FC	Nashville, Tennessee
7:30 p.m. CDT	Godoy (yellow card) 32'; Muyl (yellow card) 41'; Maher 62'; Haakenson 83', 90+2' (yellow card) 90+3'	Report	Zavaleta (yellow card) 2'; Osorio 26'; Auro (yellow card) 53'; Bradley (yellow card) 69'; Mullins 81'	Stadium: Nissan Stadium; Attendance: 17,008; Referee: Ramy Touchan

June 26 10	Nashville SC	1–1	CF Montréal	Nashville, Tennessee
7:30 p.m. CDT	Lovitz (yellow card) 89'; Danladi 90+4'	Report	Camacho (yellow card) 33'; Toye (yellow card) 43'; Struna 63'; Miller (yellow card) 84'	Stadium: Nissan Stadium; Attendance: 22,523; Referee: Jon Freemon

July 3 11	Nashville SC	1–0	Philadelphia Union	Nashville, Tennessee
7:00 p.m. CDT	Sapong 2'	Report	Martínez (yellow card) 79'	Stadium: Nissan Stadium; Attendance: 21,822; Referee: Robert Sibiga

July 8 12	Nashville SC	2–2	Atlanta United FC	Nashville, Tennessee
7:30 p.m. CDT	Anibaba 14'; Leal (yellow card) 28'; Mukhtar 49' (pen.); Haakenson (yellow card) 82'; McCarty (yellow card) 89'	Report	Walkes 5'; Wolff (yellow card) 39'; Sosa (yellow card) 44'; Torres (yellow card) 47'; Conway 58'; Moreno (yellow card) 67'; Mulraney (red card) 74'	Stadium: Nissan Stadium; Attendance: 22,913; Referee: Joe Dickerson

July 17 13	Nashville SC	5–1	Chicago Fire FC	Nashville, Tennessee
7:30 p.m. CDT	Mukhtar 10', 13', 16'; Sapong 39'; Anuga 62'	Report	Kappelhof (red card) 14'; Pineda (yellow card) 27'; Aliseda 47'; Navarro (yellow card) 49'	Stadium: Nissan Stadium; Attendance: 23,113; Referee: Lukasz Szpala

July 21 14	Columbus Crew	0–0	Nashville SC	Columbus, Ohio
6:30 p.m. CDT	Kitchen (yellow card) 18'; Hurtado (yellow card) 43'	Report	LaGrassa (yellow card) 21'	Stadium: Mapfre Stadium; Attendance: 18,395; Referee: Rosendo Mendoza

July 24 15	Nashville SC	3–0	FC Cincinnati	Nashville, Tennessee
6:30 CDT	Sapong 13', 57', (yellow card) 68'; Leal 35'; Mukhtar (yellow card) 84'	Report	Vallecilla (yellow card) 38'; Cameron (yellow card) 81'	Stadium: Nissan Stadium; Attendance: 23,832; Referee: Guido Gonzales Jr.

August 1 16	Toronto FC	1–1	Nashville SC	Toronto, Ontario
6:30 CDT	Gonzalez 20'	Report	Castellanos 41'; McCarty (yellow card) 67'	Stadium: BMO Field; Referee: Fotis Bazakos

August 4 17	New England Revolution	0–0	Nashville SC	Foxborough, Massachusetts
6:00 p.m. CDT	Bou (yellow card) 34'; Farrell (yellow card) 37'; Kaptoum (yellow card) 48'	Report	LaGrassa (yellow card) 33'	Stadium: Gillette Stadium; Attendance: 10,279; Referee: Silviu Petrescu

August 8 18	Inter Miami CF	2–1	Nashville SC	Fort Lauderdale, Florida
5:00 p.m. CDT	Higuaín 60'; Vassilev 90+5'	Report	McCarty (yellow card) 45+2'; Sapong 48'	Stadium: DRV PNK Stadium; Attendance: 14,062; Referee: Nima Saghafi

August 15 19	Nashville SC	5–2	D.C. United	Nashville, Tennessee
6:00 p.m. CDT	Sapong 14', 31'; Mukhtar 37'; Muyl 80', 87' (pen.)	Report	Brillant 3'; Kamara 41'	Stadium: Nissan Stadium; Attendance: 20,022; Referee: Drew Fischer

August 18 20	Nashville SC	1–1	Orlando City SC	Nashville, Tennessee
7:30 p.m. CDT	Sapong 23'; Maher (yellow card) 32'; Anunga (yellow card) 65'; McCarty (yellow card) 81'	Report	Smith (yellow card) 40'; Jansson (yellow card) 49'; Carlos 58', (yellow card) 78'	Stadium: Nissan Stadium; Attendance: 13.154; Referee: Fotis Bazakos

August 28 22	Atlanta United	0–2	Nashville SC	Atlanta, Georgia
3:30 PM EDT	Barco (yellow card) 37'; Sejdič (yellow card) 61'	Report	Lovitz (yellow card) 26'; Ríos 45+2'; Anunga (yellow card) 74'; Leal 90+5'	Stadium: Mercedes-Benz Stadium; Attendance: 42,506; Referee: Rosendo Mendoza

September 3 22	Nashville SC	3–1	New York City FC	Nashville, Tennessee
7:30 p.m. CDT	Mukhtar 30', 68', (yellow card) 73'; Latinovich 32' (o.g.); McCarty (red card) 45'; Muyl (yellow card) 71'; Haakenson (yellow card) 89'	Report	Medina (yellow card) 38'; Moralez (red card) 45'; Castellanos (yellow card) 64', (goal) 90'; Acevedo (yellow card) 73'	Stadium: Nissan Stadium; Attendance: 20,126; Referee: TImothy Ford

September 11 23	CF Montréal	0–1	Nashville SC	Fort Lauderdale, Florida
12:00 p.m. CDT	Bassong (yellow card) 44'	Report	Mukhtar (yellow card) 41'; Anunga (yellow card) 58'; Zimmerman 66'; Willis (yellow card) 85'	Stadium: DRV PNK Stadium; Referee: Silviu Petrescu

September 18 24	Toronto FC	2–1	Nashville SC	Toronto, Ontario
6:30 p.m. CDT	Shaffelburg 18'; Bradley (yellow card) 39'; Gonzalez 79'	Report	Lovitz (yellow card) 32'; Sapong 74'	Stadium: BMO Field; Attendance: 9,892; Referee: Pierre-Luc Lauziere

September 22 25	Inter Miami CF	1–5	Nashville SC	Fort Lauderdale, Florida
6:30 p.m. CDT	Higuaín 64'; Gregore (yellow card) 75' (yellow-red card) 86'	Report	Mukhtar 6', 48', (yellow card) 67'; Zimmerman 39'; Leal 70'; Johnston 90+6'	Stadium: DRV PNK Stadium; Attendance: 13,033; Referee: Jon Freemon

September 26 26	Chicago Fire FC	0–0	Nashville SC	Chicago, Illinois
12:00 p.m. CDT	Pineda (yellow card) 50'	Report	Anunga (yellow card) 56'	Stadium: Soldier Field; Attendance: 15,915; Referee: Timothy Ford

September 29 27	Nashville SC	2–2	Orlando City SC	Nashville, Tennessee
7:30 p.m. CDT	Mukhtar 11'; Godoy (yellow card) 34'; Leal 59'; Johnston (yellow card) 82'	Report	Pereyra (yellow card) 31'; Schlegel (yellow card) 62'; Dike 76' (pen.); Carlos (yellow card) 81'; Anunga 90+3' (o.g.)	Stadium: Nissan Stadium; Attendance: 18,648; Referee: Drew Fischer

October 3 28	New York City FC	0–0	Nashville SC	New York, New York
5:00 p.m. CDT	Moralez (yellow card) 70'; Gray (yellow card) 88'	Report		Stadium: Yankee Stadium; Referee: Marcos de Oliveira

October 16 29	D.C. United	0–0	Nashville SC	Washington D.C.
6:30 p.m. CDT	Canouse (yellow card) 33'; Mora (yellow card) 46'	Report	Mukhtar (yellow card) 62'; McCarty (yellow card) 90+4'	Stadium: Audi Field; Attendance: 18,034; Referee: Ismail Elfath

October 20 30	Nashville SC	1–1	Columbus Crew	Nashville, Tennessee
7:30 p.m. CDT	Mukhtar 77', (yellow card) 90'; Haakenson (yellow card) 90+5'	Report	Nagbe (yellow card) 71'; Zelarayán 75'	Stadium: Nissan Stadium; Attendance: 18,381; Referee: Alex Chilowicz

October 23 31	Philadelphia Union	1–0	Nashville SC	Chester, Pennsylvania
6:30 p.m. CDT	Przybyłko 18' (pen.), (yellow card) 27'; Glesnes (yellow card) 55'; Monteiro (yellow card) 62'	Report	Loba (yellow card) 23'; Godoy (yellow card) 53'; Nealis (yellow card) 90+2'	Stadium: Subaru Park; Attendance: 18,575; Referee: Armando Villarreal

October 27 32	FC Cincinnati	3–6	Nashville SC	Cincinnati, Ohio
6:30 p.m. CDT	Brenner 17' (pen.); Brandon Vazquez 32'; Cameron (yellow card) 35'; Acosta (yellow card) 70'	Report	Romney 6' (o.g.); Lovitz (yellow card) 21'; Zimmerman 28'; Leal 45+2', 76'; Sapong 71', 90+2'; Loba 80'	Stadium: TQL Stadium; Attendance: 20,581; Referee: Ramy Touchan

October 31 33	Orlando City SC	1–1	Nashville SC	Orlando, Florida
6:30 p.m. CDT	Dike 18'; Méndez (yellow card) 49'; Urso (yellow card) 57'	Report	Zimmerman (yellow card) 40'; Mukhtar 53'; Johnston (yellow card) 56'	Stadium: Exploria Stadium; Attendance: 15,959; Referee: Allen Chapman

November 7 34	Nashville SC	1–1	New York Red Bulls	Nashville, Tennessee
2:30 p.m. CST	Mukhtar 37'; Godoy (yellow card) 76'	Report	Fábio 1'; Davis (yellow card) 14'; Diarra (yellow card) 86'	Stadium: Nissan Stadium; Attendance: 26,913; Referee: Drew Fischer

=== MLS Cup Playoffs ===
November 23 First round	Nashville SC	3–1	Orlando City SC	Nashville, Tennessee
7:00 pm	Mukhtar 21', 74'; Anibaba (yellow card) 85'; Cádiz 90+4'	Report	Dike 14'; Pereyra (yellow card) 39'; Méndez (yellow card) 65'	Stadium: Nissan Stadium; Attendance: 26,043; Referee: Ismail Elfath

November 28 Conf. Semifinals	Philadelphia Union	1–1 (a.e.t.) (2–0 p)	Nashville SC	Chester, Pennsylvania
4:30 PM CST	Gazdag 45+2'	Report	Mukhtar 38'	Stadium: Subaru Park; Referee: Allen Chapman
	Penalties
	Elliott (penalty scored); Santos (penalty missed); McGlynn (penalty scored)		(penalty missed) Mukhtar; (penalty missed) Godoy; (penalty missed) Muyl; (penalty missed) Zimmerman
Note: Philadelphia advance on penalties 2–0
