= Nashville SC =

American professional soccer club in Tennessee

- Full name: Nashville Soccer Club
- Nicknames: Coyotes; Boys in Gold
- Founded: May 19, 2016; 10 years ago (Note: Club founded in 2016. MLS franchise granted in 2017.)
- Stadium: Geodis Park; Nashville, Tennessee
- Capacity: 30,000
- Owners: List: John Ingram Jim Toth Derrick Henry Reese Witherspoon Steve and Jay Turner Justin Ishbia Filip Forsberg Giannis, Thanasis, Alex and Kostas Antetokounmpo
- CEO: Ian Ayre
- Head coach: B. J. Callaghan
- League: Major League Soccer
- 2026: Eastern Conference: 1st Overall: 1st Playoffs: TBD
- Website: nashvillesc.com
Home colors	Away colors	Third colors

Nashville Soccer Club is an American professional soccer club based in Nashville, Tennessee. The club competes in Major League Soccer (MLS) as a member of the Eastern Conference. The team spent two seasons in the USL Championship before joining MLS as an expansion team. The club plays its home matches at Geodis Park, the largest soccer-specific stadium in the United States. It is principally owned by John Ingram, owner of Ingram Industries, along with investors and partial owners the Turner family of Dollar General Stores.

== History ==
=== Soccer in Nashville ===
Prior to the arrival of Nashville's MLS team, the city had various soccer teams which played in the lower divisions of American soccer. The most notable teams were the Nashville Metros who played from 1989 until 2012 and Nashville FC, who played in the National Premier Soccer League (NPSL) from 2013 to 2016. The city also hosts two NCAA Division I men's soccer teams, the Belmont Bruins and Lipscomb Bisons. The Vanderbilt Commodores also played Division I men's soccer until the team's demise after the 2005 season. Prior to these teams, the Nashville Diamonds participated in the then-second division American Soccer League for one season in 1982.

The NPSL team, Nashville FC, was founded by a supporters group that intended to form a team as a fan-owned group. Chris Jones, Nashville FC's president, cited existing fan-owned clubs as inspiration for NFC's foundation, in particular the English club F.C. United of Manchester. In February 2014, the two groups merged to form a single club for the 2014 NPSL season. The club had two teams participating in the Middle Tennessee Soccer Alliance, Nashville's largest competitive adult league, and had partnered with the Tennessee State Soccer Association (TSSA), an organization with over 20,000 registered players in the Middle Tennessee area alone. The team played its matches at Vanderbilt Stadium. The NPSL club had ambitions of climbing the American soccer pyramid, with the reported target an entry into the then third-tier United Soccer League (USL; now known as the USL Championship) by 2017, and then ascension into the Division II North American Soccer League by 2020.

=== Expansion bid ===
Nashville SC was founded in 2016, when the USL awarded a franchise to the founding ownership group of the club. An existing team at the time, Nashville FC subsequently sold its team name, logo, and color scheme to then new USL franchise, in exchange for a 1 percent equity stake in the USL team and a voting seat on its board. In August 2016, a group of Nashville business leaders led by Bill Hagerty formed the Nashville MLS Organizing Committee and began efforts to secure funding for an MLS stadium.

The group fully supported the recently awarded Nashville SC, which began play in 2018. Both groups supported each other in their common vision to grow the sport in Tennessee. Former 2010 MLS Cup winning coach Gary Smith was announced as the team's first manager in April 2017. In October 2017, the group unveiled their plans for a $275 million stadium and redevelopment project, which was approved by the city in November.

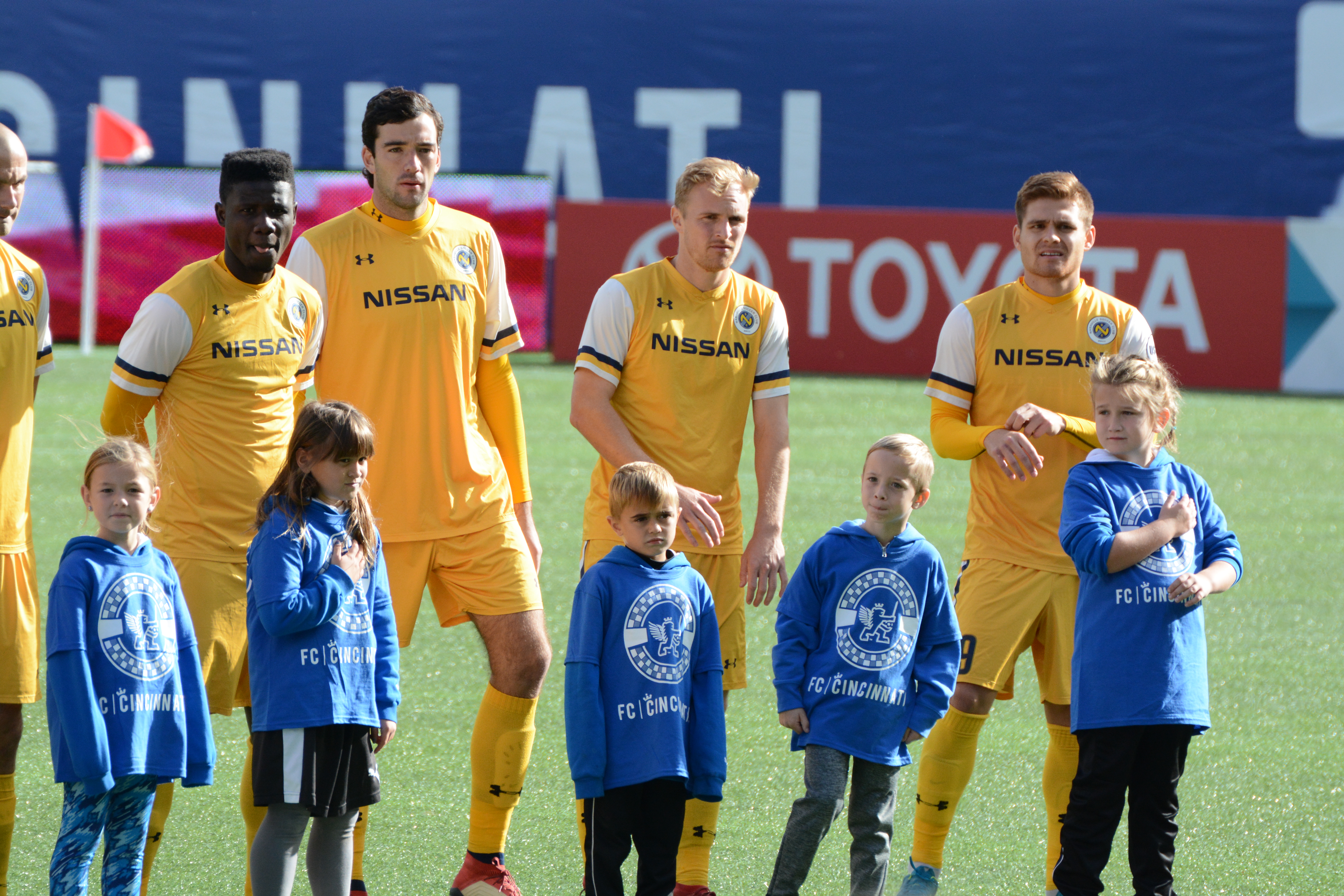
Nashville SC players: Ropapa Mensah, Tucker Hume, Matt LaGrassa, Alan Winn, in October 2018

The formal bid to add an MLS franchise to Nashville began in January 2017. On March 4, 2017, businessman John Ingram, under the entity Nashville Holdings LLC, bought a majority stake in DMD Soccer, the ownership group of Nashville SC. Ingram also headed up the bid to bring an MLS franchise to Nashville, and the partnership between Ingram and Nashville SC was an effort to present a united front to MLS after Nashville was named one of ten finalist cities for four MLS franchises.

MLS officially awarded an expansion team to Nashville on December 20, 2017, and announced that they would join the league in 2020. Mike Jacobs and Ian Ayre was announced as the Nashville's first general manager and CEO respectively. On February 10, 2018, Nashville SC competed in their first game; in preseason against Atlanta United FC. In the rain-soaked contest, Nashville was defeated by Atlanta, 3–1, in front of 9,059 spectators.

Nashville SC finished 4th in the Eastern Conference in their first season in the USL Championship. The team advanced to the Conference Semifinals in the playoffs, where they were defeated by Indy Eleven. In 2019, the final season in USL Championship, Nashville finished 2nd in the Eastern Conference regular season and advanced to the Conference Semifinals, losing to Indy Eleven 1–0 in front of 4,174 fans at First Horizon Park.

=== MLS ===
Nashville SC's inaugural MLS match was February 29, 2020, with the club hosting Atlanta United FC at Nissan Stadium. The game was played in front of 59,069, becoming the highest attended soccer event in Tennessee. Walker Zimmerman scored the team's first goal in the 2–1 loss. The inaugural season came to a halt on March 12, 2020, after only two games when the MLS suspended the season for thirty days due to the COVID-19 pandemic, then extended to until May 10, 2020. On June 10, MLS announced MLS is Back Tournament, but Nashville were unable to participate in the tournament due to multiple COVID cases on the team. Their next game was an August 12 win against FC Dallas. Nashville SC finished the 2020 regular season 8–8–7 with 32 points. They entered the MLS Cup playoffs in the play-in round defeating Inter Miami 3–0 and knocking off Toronto FC 1–0 in the first round, before being defeated by the eventual champions Columbus Crew in the conference semi-finals in extra time. Nashville performed well defensively in the 2021 season, only allowing a tied for league-leading 33 goals and going undefeated at home. The 2021 team also tied a league record for draws in a season at 18. Nashville returned to the playoffs, but was again eliminated in the conference semi-finals, this time by Philadelphia Union in a penalty shootout.

In 2022, Geodis Park opened and Hany Mukhtar won both the Landon Donovan MVP and Golden Boot awards after being a finalist for the former in the previous season. Mukhtar led the league with 34 goal contributions, nearly two thirds of Nashville's goals in 2022 and leading the team to a third consecutive playoff berth. Despite Mukhtar's success the club was eliminated in the first round of the playoffs by the LA Galaxy. The 2023 season saw a similar record to 2022, winning 13 matches in the regular season, then getting eliminated in the first round again, this time by Orlando City. During the 2023 Leagues Cup, Nashville brought in Sam Surridge, an English striker from Nottingham Forest, who made an immediate impact scoring the equalizing goal against Club America to send the game into penalties. The team had a disappointing year in 2024, only winning 9 matches, finishing 13th in the east, and missing the playoffs. After starting with a record of 3 wins, 4 losses, and 5 draws, Nashville SC fired their first manager Gary Smith. Rumba Munthali took over as an interim until July 3, when Nashville hired B.J. Callaghan as their next coach. 2025 started off great for the Boys in Gold, holding onto one of the longest unbeaten streaks across all competitions in MLS history, spanning 15 matches from April 26 to July 12. The 2025 season ended with a club-best 16 wins on 58 goals scored, but the curse of Inter Miami CF continued to haunt NSC as they lost in 3 games of the first round of the 2025 MLS Playoffs.

=== CONCACAF Champions Cup ===
The CONCACAF Champions Cup is the top tournament for clubs in CONCACAF, one of the six FIFA governing bodies of football. Nashville first qualified in 2024 by making the final of the 2023 Leagues Cup. They opened with a 7–0 aggregate over Dominican Republic side Moca FC. In the round of 16, they played Inter Miami in a rematch of the Leagues Cup final that sent them both into the cup. Despite getting out to a 2–0 in the home leg, Nashville could not hold on to it and Miami tied the first leg 2–2. Miami then won the away leg at Chase Stadium 3–1 to eliminate Nashville from the tournament.

The Boys in Gold qualified for their second Champions Cup in 2026 after winning the 2025 U.S. Open Cup. Their first matchup came against Canadian Premier League champion Atlético Ottawa. For the away leg, which Nashville won 2–0, the game was actually played at Hamilton Stadium in Hamilton, Ontario, as Atlético's home stadium TD Place was undergoing renovations. They then won the home leg 5–0 to eliminate Ottawa and advance to the round of 16. From there, Nashville had to face Inter Miami for the second time in the round of 16 in the Champions Cup. The game was a scoreless draw at 0–0 in GEODIS Park. In the away leg, Miami would strike first, with Messi scoring his 900th career goal in the 7th minute, but a Cristian Espinoza strike in the 74th minute to make the aggregate 1–1 was good for Nashville to upset Miami and advance on away goals. In Nashville's first CCC quarterfinal appearance, they went up against Club América. Despite the Mexico City side's storied history, Nashville prior to this point maintained an unbeaten record against them, drawing 3–3 in a friendly and advancing after penalties following a 2–2 draw in the 2023 Leagues Cup. In the first leg, the clubs tied 0–0 for their third draw in a row. As the team traveled to Mexico City for the second leg, Nashville would be the victors as Hany Mukhtar would score the only goal of a 1–0 aggregate. With the win, Nashville SC would also become the first MLS team to win a competitive match at the historic Estadio Azteca. As Nashville advanced deeper into the tournament, they would be matched up against their second Mexican opponent, the UANL Tigres, a team from the Monterrey metropolitan area. An injured squad lacking Surridge, Tasgeth, and Yazbek could not break through and lost on a 0–2 aggregate, ending their furthest run in Champions Cup history.

=== Leagues Cup ===
2023 saw the inaugural Leagues Cup, a competition between the MLS and Liga MX, the highest level of football in Mexico. Nashville made a historic run to the final of that tournament, eliminating FC Cincinnati, Club América, Minnesota United, and C.F. Monterrey, before facing the newly signed Lionel Messi and Inter Miami in the final, losing in the 11th round of penalties in Geodis Park. Sam Surridge played his first game in Nashville against América, scoring the game-tying goal in the 99th minute.

In 2024, Nashville qualified for the Leagues Cup in East 5 of the group stage along with the New England Revolution and Mazatlán FC, but failed to beat either of them and did not qualify for the round of 16. Nashville did not qualify for the 2025 Leagues Cup since they did not qualify for the 2024 MLS Cup Playoffs. However, they did qualify for the 2026 edition and will face Club Léon, Atlético San Luis, and CF Monterrey in the Eastern 2 regional grouping.

=== US Open Cup ===
The U.S. Open Cup is the oldest national soccer tournament in the United States, beginning in 1913.

==== 2018–2019 ====
Nashville's first Open Cup berth, back in their USL days, came in their inaugural season in 2018. They opened in the second round with a 2–0 win over crosstown rivals Inter Nashville FC. They then beat Premier Development League side Mississippi Brilla 3–1. In the fourth round, NSC upset MLS side Colorado Rapids 2–0 off an own goal from Colorado in the 38th minute for their first win against an MLS opponent. Their inaugural run ended with a 2–1 loss to USL rivals Louisville City FC at Lynn Family Stadium.

In their second appearance in 2019, Nashville, playing on the Middle Tennessee State University(MTSU) campus in Murfreesboro, their first home game outside Davidson County, managed to outlast a late effort from South Georgia Tormenta FC 2 3–2. Staying on the MTSU campus, they hosted USL side Charleston Battery, where they lost on 3–0 on penalties after holding them to a 1–1 draw after extra time.

==== 2020–present ====
Nashville first qualified as an MLS team for the 2020 U.S. Open Cup but did not play as the tournament was cancelled due to the pandemic. They first played in the 2022 version, opening with a win over the defending champions Atlanta United in the round of 32 with a three-goal comeback down from 2–0. Nashville then beat Louisville City FC in the round of 16 but fell in the quarterfinals to Orlando City SC on penalties. In the 2023 Open Cup, Nashville opened with a 1–0 win over San Antonio FC and a 2–0 win over FC Dallas before losing to Inter Miami 2–1 in the round of 16.

The 2025 Open Cup was the most important tournament in the club's history. Nashville started by squeaking out a 1–0 win over in-state USL League One side Chattanooga Red Wolves SC in the round of 32 with the lone goal in the 27th minute scored by Josh Bauer. They then beat Orlando City SC on the road in their Open Cup rematch 2–3 thanks to an own goal from Rodrigo Schlegel in the 23rd minute. Nashville then returned home to face DC United. They started down 2–0 off a goal in the 5th minute and an own goal from Jack Maher in the 24th minute. However, Nashville responded one minute later with a goal of their own from Jonathan Pérez and then scored four more unanswered goals to win 5–2 and advance to their first Open Cup semifinal. After that, Nashville eliminated Philadelphia Union 3–1 off a Surridge hat trick to advance to their first finals appearance in Open Cup history and first finals appearance in any tournament since the 2023 Leagues Cup. In the final, the Boys in Gold beat Austin FC 2–1 off a penalty kick from Surridge in the 60th minute, who would get shown the red card in the 96th minute. The win was the first championship for the club and first championship for any major professional team in the state of Tennessee. The win also allowed Nashville to qualify for the 2026 CONCACAF Champions Cup. In November 2026 Nashville won the Supporters Shield for the first time in their history. Nashville went on to finish the regular season with a league record 77 points.

== Club crest and colors ==
The first logo of Nashville SC, originally carried over the same blue and yellow colors, of the previous Nashville FC logo. Due to trademark issues, the team revealed a different logo and change to their name, being Nashville SC. The center of the updated white and blue circular logo, featured a yellow stylized N crossed under six stripes, to emulate guitar strings with the letters "SC" included in the circle.

Nashville SC's primary colors are electric gold and acoustic blue, referencing the colors of Nashville's flag. The club's crest is a gold octagon with a monogram "N" and several vertical bars in blue. The vertical bars were chosen to represent sound waves and vibrations, referencing the city's musical history.

=== Sponsorship ===
Period	Kit manufacturer	Shirt sponsor	Sleeve sponsor	Ref.
2018–2019	Under Armour	Nissan	—	
2020–present	Adidas	Renasant Bank	Hyundai	

== Supporters ==
Nashville SC's original organized supporter group is The Roadies. Established in February 2014 with the creation of Nashville FC, the city's NPSL amateur franchise with the club's transition from NPSL amateur to USL pro status and finally MLS, The Roadies similarly transitioned to maintain their support for "Our Town, Our Club".

== Stadium ==
The team plays at the 30,000 seat Geodis Park, the largest soccer-specific stadium in the United States and Canada. The $275 million stadium was mostly funded by revenue bonds from the Nashville government, per an agreement with the Nashville Metro Council that was approved in November 2017. The council approved the stadium on September 4, 2018, in front of an audience with mixed opinions on the project, with the votes 31-yes and 8-no. A proposal to submit the plan to a referendum based on Metro government's "partial funding" was rejected by the council, with the votes 25-yes (to reject the referendum) and 12-no (to permit).

In January 2019, John Rose, a U.S. representative from Cookeville led the nonprofit that operates the Tennessee State Fair to sue the team to halt construction, citing that the stadium would not leave adequate space required for the functions of the fair. However, in February of the same year, Rose and the nonprofit dismissed the lawsuit citing that city officials would not meet with the nonprofit while this suit was pending. Demolition on the Fairgrounds site began in March 2020.

The agreement of the stadium and its funding details was amended on February 13, 2020, with the help of Nashville Mayor John Cooper to make the stadium 100 percent privately funded with the team will also funding $19 million of infrastructure improvements in the immediate area. Nashville, during the USL era primarily played at First Tennessee Park before switching to Nissan Stadium for their first two seasons in MLS. Due to the COVID-19 pandemic, there were limited seating capacity in their tenure while using Nissan Stadium.

== Players and staff ==
=== Current roster ===
As of September 1, 2026

Note: Flags indicate national team as defined under FIFA eligibility rules; some limited exceptions apply. Players may hold more than one non-FIFA nationality.

No.	Pos.	Nation	Player
1	GK	USA	Joe Willis
2	DF	USA	Dan Lovitz
3	DF	GHA	Maxwell Woledzi
4	DF	COL	Jeisson Palacios
5	DF	USA	Jack Maher
6	MF	HON	Bryan Acosta
7	FW	ARG	Cristian Espinoza (DP)
8	MF	AUS	Patrick Yazbek
9	FW	ENG	Sam Surridge (DP)
10	MF	GER	Hany Mukhtar (DP)
11	FW	TUN	Elias Saad (on loan from FC Augsburg)
13	GK	DOM	Xavier Valdez
14	MF	GHA	Shak Mohammed
15	FW	CHI	Zidane Yáñez

No.	Pos.	Nation	Player
16	MF	USA	Matthew Corcoran
17	DF	USA	Owen Presthus (on loan from Columbus Crew)
19	MF	USA	Alex Muyl
20	MF	NOR	Edvard Tagseth
21	DF	USA	Thomas Williams
22	DF	USA	Josh Bauer
23	DF	CAN	Jordan Knight
26	MF	SEN	Famara Camara
27	DF	USA	Reed Baker-Whiting
31	DF	HON	Andy Najar
35	DF	JAM	Malachi Molina (on loan from FC Dallas)
37	MF	IRQ	Ahmed Qasem
41	FW	CRC	Warren Madrigal
99	GK	USA	Brian Schwake

=== Out on loan ===
Note: Flags indicate national team as defined under FIFA eligibility rules; some limited exceptions apply. Players may hold more than one non-FIFA nationality.

No.	Pos.	Nation	Player
12	MF	CAN	Charles-Emile Brunet (on loan to St. Louis City)
18	DF	USA	Isaiah LeFlore (on loan to Tampa Bay Rowdies)
33	DF	USA	Chris Applewhite (HG; on loan to Austin FC)

No.	Pos.	Nation	Player
47	MF	SLE	Isaiah Jones (HG; on loan to Chattanooga FC)
77	FW	USA	Adem Sipić (HG; on loan to Gefle)

=== Staff ===
As of May 16, 2024

Technical Staff
Head coach	B.J. Callaghan
Assistant coach	John Bello
Assistant coach	Michael Nsien
Goalkeeping coach	Danny Cepero
General manager	Mike Jacobs
Assistant general manager	Oliver Miller-Farrell
Chief scout	Luke Sassano

=== Head coach history ===
- Gary Smith (2017–2024)
- B.J. Callaghan (2024–present)

== Team records ==
=== Seasons ===
Season	League												Position		Playoffs	USOC	Continental / Other		Average attendance (Note: Average attendance only includes statistics from regular season matches.)	Top goalscorer(s) (Note: Top goalscorer(s) includes all goals scored in the regular season, playoffs, U.S. Open Cup, MLS is Back Tournament, Leagues Cup, CONCACAF Champions League, FIFA Club World Cup, and other competitive continental matches.)		Ref.
Season	Div	League	Con	Pld	W	L	D	GF	GA	GD	Pts	PPG	Conf.	Overall	Playoffs	USOC	Continental / Other		Average attendance	Player(s)	Goals	Ref.
2018	2	USL	E	34	12	13	9	42	31	+11	49	1.44	8th	17th	R1	Ro16	DNQ		9,561	(United States) Brandon Allen	9	
2019	2	USLC	E	34	20	7	7	59	26	+33	67	1.97	2nd	3rd	QF	R3	DNQ		6,999	(Mexico) Daniel Ríos	21	
2020	1	MLS	E (Note: In 2020, Nashville SC switched from the Western Conference to the Eastern Conference after playing 2 matches.)	23	8	7	8	24	22	+2	32	1.39	7th	14th	QF	NH	MLS is Back Tournament	DNE	12,925	(Germany) Hany Mukhtar	5	
2021	1	MLS	E	34	12	4	18	55	33	+22	54	1.59	3rd	7th	QF	NH	DNQ		19,338	(Germany) Hany Mukhtar	19	
2022	1	MLS	W	34	13	10	11	52	41	+11	50	1.47	5th	10th	R1	QF	DNQ		27,554	(Germany) Hany Mukhtar	26 ♦	
2023	1	MLS	E	34	13	11	10	39	32	+7	49	1.44	7th	12th	R1	R16	Leagues Cup	RU	28,257	(Germany) Hany Mukhtar	17	
2024	1	MLS	E	34	9	16	9	38	54	–16	36	1.06	13th	25th	DNQ	DNE	CONCACAF Champions Cup Leagues Cup	R16 GS	28,599	(England) Sam Surridge	12	
2025	1	MLS	E	34	16	12	6	58	45	13	54	1.59	6th	11th	R1	W	DNQ		26,638	(England) Sam Surridge	24	
Total				261	103	80	78	367	284	+83	391	1.5	—	—	—	—	—		—	(Germany) Hany Mukhtar	66	—

== Honors ==
=== Domestic ===
Runners-up indicated in italics

Domestic
Competitions	Titles	Runners-up	Seasons
Eastern Conference (Regular Season)	1	1	2026, 2019
Supporters' Shield	1	0	2026
U.S. Open Cup	1	0	2025
International
Competitions	Titles	Runners-up	Seasons
Leagues Cup	0	1	2023

== Player records ==
- MLS = Major League Soccer
- PO = MLS Cup playoffs
- OC = U.S. Open Cup
- LC = Leagues Cup
- CCC = CONCACAF Champions Cup

Statistics include all competitive matches since Nashville SC entered the MLS in 2020. Current players on the club's roster are shown in bold.

As of November 22, 2026

=== Most appearances ===
Rank	Name	Nat.	Period	MLS	PO	OC	LC	CCC	Total
1	**Hany Mukhtar**	(Germany)	2020–	213	12	7	11	10	253
2	**Alex Muyl**	(United States)	2020–	203	11	11	10	12	247
3	**Daniel Lovitz**	(United States)	2020–	200	10	8	12	7	237
4	**Joe Willis**	(United States)	2020–	186	11	1	5	3	206
5	**Jack Maher**	(United States)	2020–	151	6	11	7	5	180
6	Walker Zimmerman	(United States)	2020–2025	147	11	5	7	2	172
7	Aníbal Godoy	(Panama)	2020–2024	111	6	1	9	4	131
8	Brian Anunga	(Cameroon)	2020–2024	109	7	6	3	3	128
9	**Sam Surridge**	(England)	2023–	99	6	3	9	6	123
10	Dax McCarty	(United States)	2020–2023	105	7	3	6	0	121

=== Top goalscorers ===
Rank	Name	Nat.	Period	MLS	PO	OC	LC	CCC	Total (Note: Numbers in brackets indicate appearances made.)	Ratio
1	**Hany Mukhtar**	(Germany)	2020–	99	5	4	2	2	**112** (253)	0.44
2	**Sam Surridge**	(England)	2023–	59	1	6	5	3	**74** (123)	0.60
3	C. J. Sapong	(United States)	2021–2023	17	0	1	0	0	**18** (80)	0.23
4	Randall Leal	(Costa Rica)	2020–2024	16	1	0	0	0	**17** (116)	0.15
5	Walker Zimmerman	(United States)	2020–2025	13	0	1	2	0	**16** (172)	0.09
5	**Alex Muyl**	(United States)	2020–	12	0	2	1	1	**16** (247)	0.06
7	Jacob Shaffelburg	(Canada)	2022–2025	11	0	0	1	2	**14** (106)	0.13
8	Teal Bunbury	(United States)	2022–2025	11	0	0	1	0	**12** (116)	0.10
9	Fafà Picault	(Haiti)	2023	5	0	1	3	0	**9** (39)	0.23
10	**Cristian Espinoza**	(Argentina)	2026–	4	0	0	2	1	**7** (39)	0.18
10	**Ahmed Qasem**	(Iraq)	2025–	4	0	1	1	1	**7** (64)	0.11
