= Randall Leal =

Costa Rican footballer (born 1997)

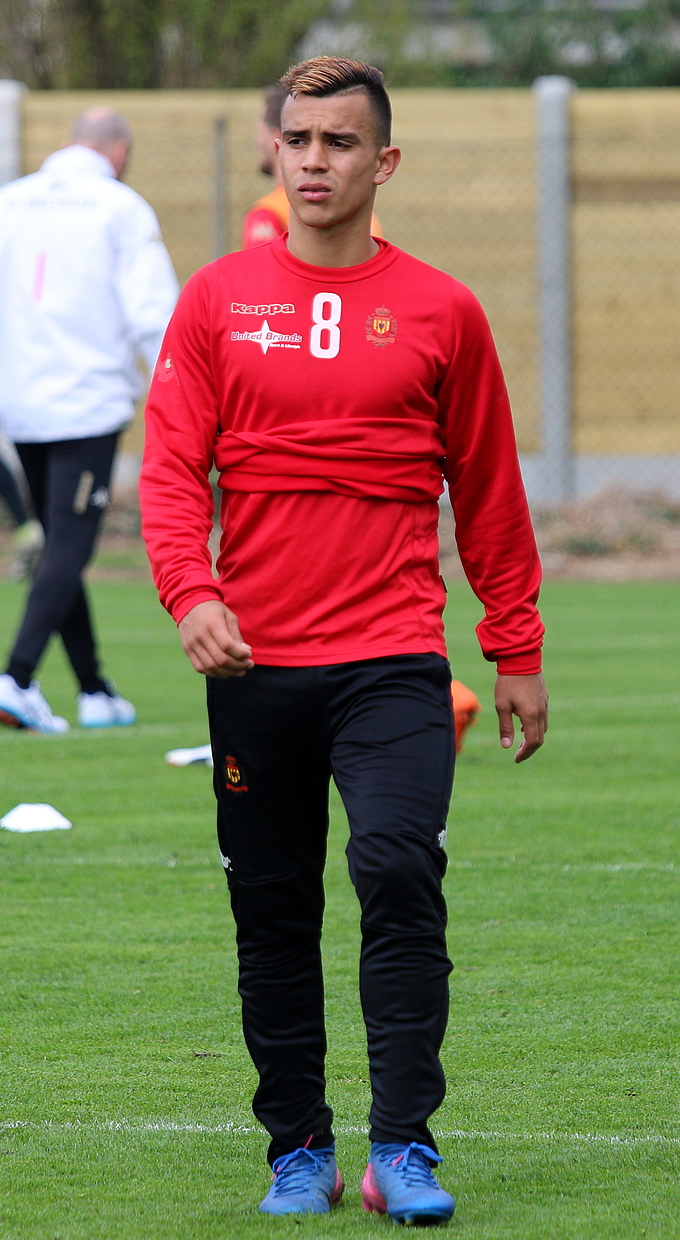
- Leal with KV Mechelen in 2017

Personal information
- Full name: Randall Enrique Leal Arley
- Date of birth: 14 January 1997 (age 29)
- Place of birth: San José, Costa Rica
- Height: 1.69 m (5 ft 7 in)
- Positions: Attacking midfielder; winger

Team information
- Current team: Herediano

Senior career*
Years	Team	Apps	(Gls)
2013–2015	Belén	23	(2)
2015–2018	KV Mechelen	13	(0)
2018–2019	Saprissa	45	(8)
2020–2024	Nashville SC	105	(16)
2023–2024	→ Huntsville City	2	(0)
2025	D.C. United	15	(0)
2026–	Herediano	0	(0)

International career^{‡}
2016–2017	Costa Rica U20	9	(4)
2021	Costa Rica U23	3	(2)
2018–	Costa Rica	29	(1)
- * Club domestic league appearances and goals as of 23:08, 1 January 2026 (UTC) ‡ National team caps and goals as of 18 November 2024

Randall Enrique Leal Arley (born 14 January 1997) is a Costa Rican professional footballer who plays for Liga FPD club Herediano and the Costa Rica national team.

In January 2025, D.C. United claimed Leal off waivers. He signed a one-year contract with an option for 2026. On 26 November, the team announced that they had declined his contract option. On 31 December, Liga FPD club Herediano announced that they had signed Leal.

== Career statistics ==
=== Club ===
As of match played 10 May 2025

Appearances and goals by club, season and competition
Club	Season	League			National cup		Continental		Other		Total	
Club	Season	Division	Apps	Goals	Apps	Goals	Apps	Goals	Apps	Goals	Apps	Goals
Belén	2013–14	Costa Rican Primera División	18	1	—		—		—		18	1
Belén	2014–15	Liga FPD	5	1	—		—		—		5	1
Belén	Total		23	2	—		—		—		23	2
KV Mechelen	2015–16	Belgian Pro League	11	0	—		—		—		11	0
KV Mechelen	2016–17	Belgian Pro League	1	0	—		—		5 (Note: Appearance(s) in UEFA Europa League Playoffs)	0	6	0
KV Mechelen	2017–18	Belgian Pro League	1	0	1	0	—		—		2	0
KV Mechelen	Total		13	0	1	0	—		5	0	19	0
Saprissa	2018–19	Liga FPD	26	4	—		2 (Note: Appearance(s) in CONCACAF Champions League)	0	—		28	4
Saprissa	2019–20	Liga FPD	19	4	—		9 (Note: Appearance(s) in CONCACAF League)	0	—		28	4
Saprissa	Total		45	8	—		11	0	—		56	8
Nashville SC	2020	MLS	21	3	—		—		3 (Note: Appearance(s) in MLS Cup Playoffs)	1	24	4
Nashville SC	2021	MLS	31	8	—		—		2	0	33	8
Nashville SC	2022	MLS	28	2	1	0	—		2 (Note: Appearance in MLS Cup Playoffs and Leagues Cup)	0	31	2
Nashville SC	2023	MLS	21	3	2	0	—		2 (Note: Appearances in Leagues Cup)	0	25	3
Nashville SC	2024	MLS	4	0	0	0	—		—		4	0
Nashville SC	Total		105	16	3	0	—		9	1	117	17
Huntsville FC	2023	MLS Next Pro	1	0	—		—		—		1	0
Huntsville FC	2024	MLS Next Pro	1	0	—		—		—		1	0
Huntsville FC	Total		2	0	—		—		—		2	0
D.C. United	2025	MLS	4	0	1	0	—		0	0	5	0
Career total			192	26	5	0	11	0	14	1	222	27

=== International ===
As of match played 18 November 2024

Appearances and goals by national team and year
National team	Year	Apps	Goals
Costa Rica	2018	6	0
Costa Rica	2019	9	0
Costa Rica	2020	2	0
Costa Rica	2021	9	0
Costa Rica	2023	2	1
Costa Rica	2024	1	0
Total		29	1

No.	Date	Venue	Opponent	Score	Result	Competition
1.	8 September 2023	St James' Park, Newcastle, England	Saudi Arabia	3–1	3–1	Friendly

== Honours ==
Saprissa

- CONCACAF League: 2019

Individual

- CONCACAF U-20 Championship Best XI: 2017
