= Jonathan Pérez (footballer, born 2003) =

Professional footballer

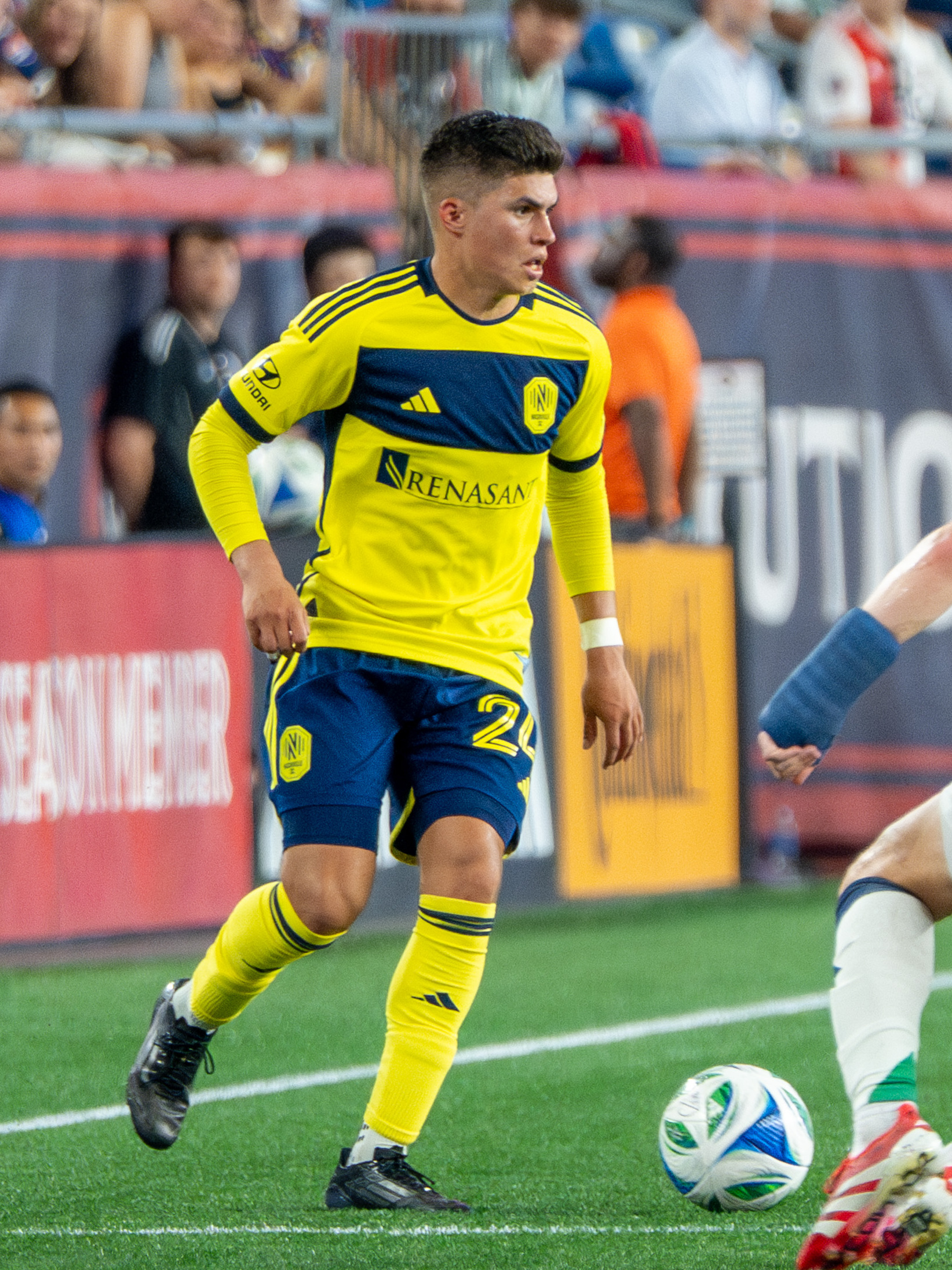
- Pérez with Nashville SC in 2025

Personal information
- Date of birth: January 18, 2003 (age 23)
- Place of birth: Pico Rivera, California, United States
- Height: 1.68 m (5 ft 6 in)
- Positions: Attacking midfielder; winger

Team information
- Current team: Guadalajara
- Number: 18

Youth career
- 2016–2020: LA Galaxy

Senior career*
Years	Team	Apps	(Gls)
2020–2023	Ventura County	53	(11)
2021–2025	LA Galaxy	16	(0)
2024–2025	→ Nashville SC (loan)	25	(1)
2024–2025	→ Huntsville City (loan)	4	(2)
2025	Nashville SC	3	(0)
2026–	Guadalajara	3	(0)
2026–	→ Tapatío	1	(0)

International career^{‡}
2019	United States U16	3	(0)
2019	Mexico U16	3	(0)
2020	Mexico U18	2	(0)
2021–2022	Mexico U20	10	(2)
2023–	Mexico U23	4	(0)
Medal record
Men's football
Representing Mexico
Toulon Tournament
Second place	2023 France	Team
Central American and Caribbean Games
Silver medal – second place	2026 Santo Domingo
- * Club domestic league appearances and goals as of September 19, 2025 ‡ National team caps and goals as of June 18, 2023

Jonathan Alexánder Pérez Lara (born January 18, 2003) is a professional footballer who plays as a winger for Liga MX club Guadalajara. Born in the United States, he plays for the Mexico national under-23 team.

== Club career ==
Pérez began his career with the LA Galaxy youth academy in 2016. On February 21, 2020, he signed a homegrown player deal with the club's first team in Major League Soccer. He made his professional debut on March 8, 2020, for LA Galaxy's USL Championship side, appearing as a 56th-minute substitute in a 5–1 win over Rio Grande Valley FC.

On July 30, 2024, Pérez was loaned to Nashville SC for the remainder of the season. On August 21, 2025, Nashville made Pérez's stay permanent in exchange for $1.5 million guaranteed and up to an additional $300,000 if certain performance requirements get met.

On February 10, 2026, Pérez was transferred to Mexican club Guadalajara, with Nashville receiving a club-record fee.

== International career ==
Born in the United States, Pérez is of Mexican descent. He represented the Mexico U-18 team in January 2020 in the Copa del Atlantico.

Pérez was called up to the Mexico U-20 team by Luis Ernesto Pérez to participate at the 2021 Revelations Cup, scoring one goal in three appearances, where Mexico won the competition. He was included in the under-20 side that participated in the 2022 CONCACAF U-20 Championship, in which Mexico failed to qualify for the FIFA U-20 World Cup and Olympics.

== Career statistics ==
=== Club ===
As of match played on September 19, 2026

Club	Season	League			Cup		Continental		Other		Total	
Club	Season	Division	Apps	Goals	Apps	Goals	Apps	Goals	Apps	Goals	Apps	Goals
Ventura County	2020	USL	13	4	—		—		—		13	4
Ventura County	2021	USL	17	1	—		—		—		17	1
Ventura County	2022	USL	4	3	—		—		—		4	3
Ventura County	2023	MLS Next Pro	14	2	—		—		—		14	2
Ventura County	2024	MLS Next Pro	5	1	—		—		—		5	1
Ventura County	Total		53	11	—		—		—		53	11
LA Galaxy	2021	MLS	3	0	—		—		—		3	0
LA Galaxy	2022	MLS	1	0	3	0	—		1 (Note: Appearances in Leagues Cup)	1	5	1
LA Galaxy	2023	MLS	6	0	—		—		—		6	0
LA Galaxy	2024	MLS	6	0	—		—		—		6	0
LA Galaxy	Total		16	0	3	0	—		1	1	20	1
Nashville SC (loan)	2024	MLS	6	0	—		—		1	0	7	0
Nashville SC (loan)	2025	MLS	19	1	3	1	—		—		22	2
Nashville SC (loan)	Total		25	1	3	1	—		1	0	29	2
Huntsville City (loan)	2024	MLS Next Pro	3	2	—		—		—		3	2
Huntsville City (loan)	2025	MLS Next Pro	1	0	—		—		—		1	0
Huntsville City (loan)	Total		4	2	—		—		—		4	2
Nashville SC	2025	MLS	3	0	—		—		—		3	0
Guadalajara	2025–26	Liga MX	1	0	—		—		—		1	0
Guadalajara	2026–27	Liga MX	2	0	—		—		—		2	0
Guadalajara	Total		3	0	—		—		—		3	0
Tapatío (loan)	2026–27	Liga de Expansión MX	1	0	—		—		—		1	0
Career total			105	14	6	1	0	0	2	1	113	16

== Honours ==
Mexico U20

- Revelations Cup: 2021
