= Jack Maher (soccer) =

American soccer player (born 1999)

- Maher with Nashville SC in 2026

Personal information
- Full name: Jack Michael Maher
- Date of birth: October 28, 1999 (age 27)
- Place of birth: Caseyville, Illinois, United States
- Height: 6 ft 3 in (1.91 m)
- Position: Defender

Team information
- Current team: Nashville SC
- Number: 5

Youth career
- 2011–2016: St. Louis Scott Gallagher

College career
Years	Team	Apps	(Gls)
2018–2019	Indiana Hoosiers	46	(4)

Senior career*
Years	Team	Apps	(Gls)
2016–2017	Saint Louis FC U23	13	(0)
2017–2018	Saint Louis FC	2	(0)
2020–	Nashville SC	110	(5)
2020	→ Charlotte Independence (loan)	1	(0)
2021	→ San Diego Loyal (loan)	5	(0)

International career
2015–2017	United States U18		
- * Club domestic league appearances and goals as of October 23, 2024

Jack Michael Maher (born October 28, 1999) is an American professional soccer player who plays as a defender for Major League Soccer club Nashville SC.

== Career ==
=== Early career ===
Maher played on an amateur contract with United Soccer League side Saint Louis FC during their 2017 season. He committed to play for the Indiana Hoosiers at Indiana University the following year.

=== Nashville SC ===
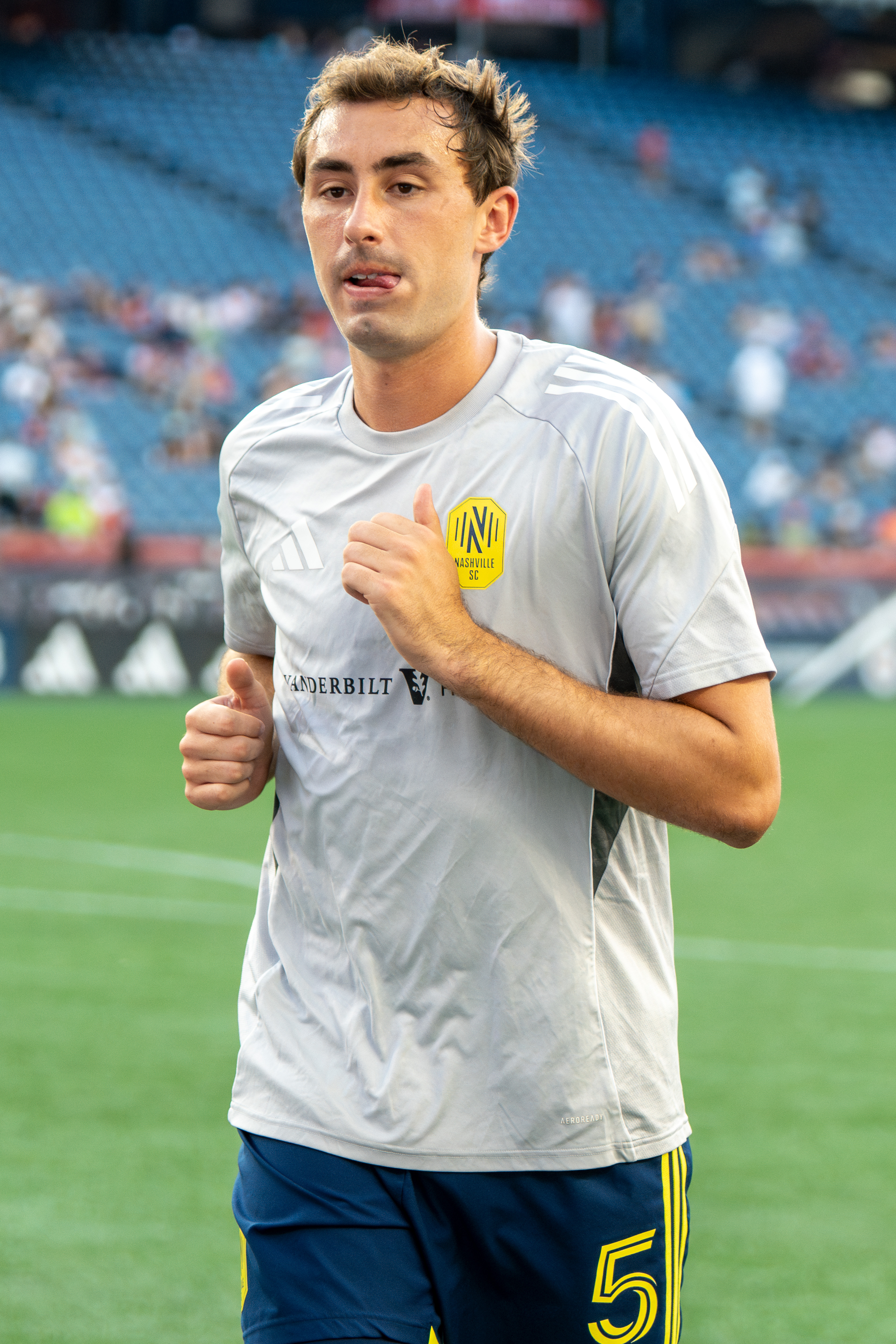
Maher with Nashville SC in 2025

Maher was signed by MLS as a Generation Adidas in December 2019, making him available in 2020 MLS SuperDraft. Maher was drafted by Nashville with the second overall pick in the SuperDraft on January 9, 2020.

==== Charlotte Independence (loan) ====
On March 6, 2020, Maher joined USL Championship club Charlotte Independence on loan ahead of the 2020 season.

==== San Diego Loyal (loan) ====
On May 28, 2021, Maher joined San Diego Loyal SC on loan for the 2021 season. However, he was recalled by Nashville on June 23, 2021.

== Personal life ==
Maher has three brothers: J.D., Joey, and Josh; the latter two also play professional soccer.

== Career statistics ==
As of match played 6 October 2024

Appearances and goals by club, season and competition
Club	Season	League			National cup		Continental		Other		Total	
Club	Season	Division	Apps	Goals	Apps	Goals	Apps	Goals	Apps	Goals	Apps	Goals
Saint Louis FC	2017	USL Championship	1	0	0	0	—		—		1	0
Saint Louis FC	2018	USL Championship	1	0	1	0	—		—		2	0
Saint Louis FC	Total		2	0	1	0	—		—		3	0
Nashville SC	2020	MLS	3	0	—		—		0	0	3	0
Nashville SC	2021	MLS	20	1	—		—		2	0	22	1
Nashville SC	2022	MLS	27	2	3	0	—		2	1	32	3
Nashville SC	2023	MLS	32	1	3	0	—		4	0	39	1
Nashville SC	2024	MLS	28	1	—		2	0	1	0	31	1
Nashville SC	2025	MLS	30	0	5	0	—				35	0
Nashville SC	Total		140	5	11	0	2	0	9	1	162	6
Charlotte Independence (loan)	2020	USL Championship	1	0	—		—		0	0	1	0
San Diego Loyal (loan)	2021	USL Championship	5	0	—		—		—		5	0
Career total			118	5	7	0	2	0	9	1	136	6
