= Alex Muyl =

American soccer player (born 1995)

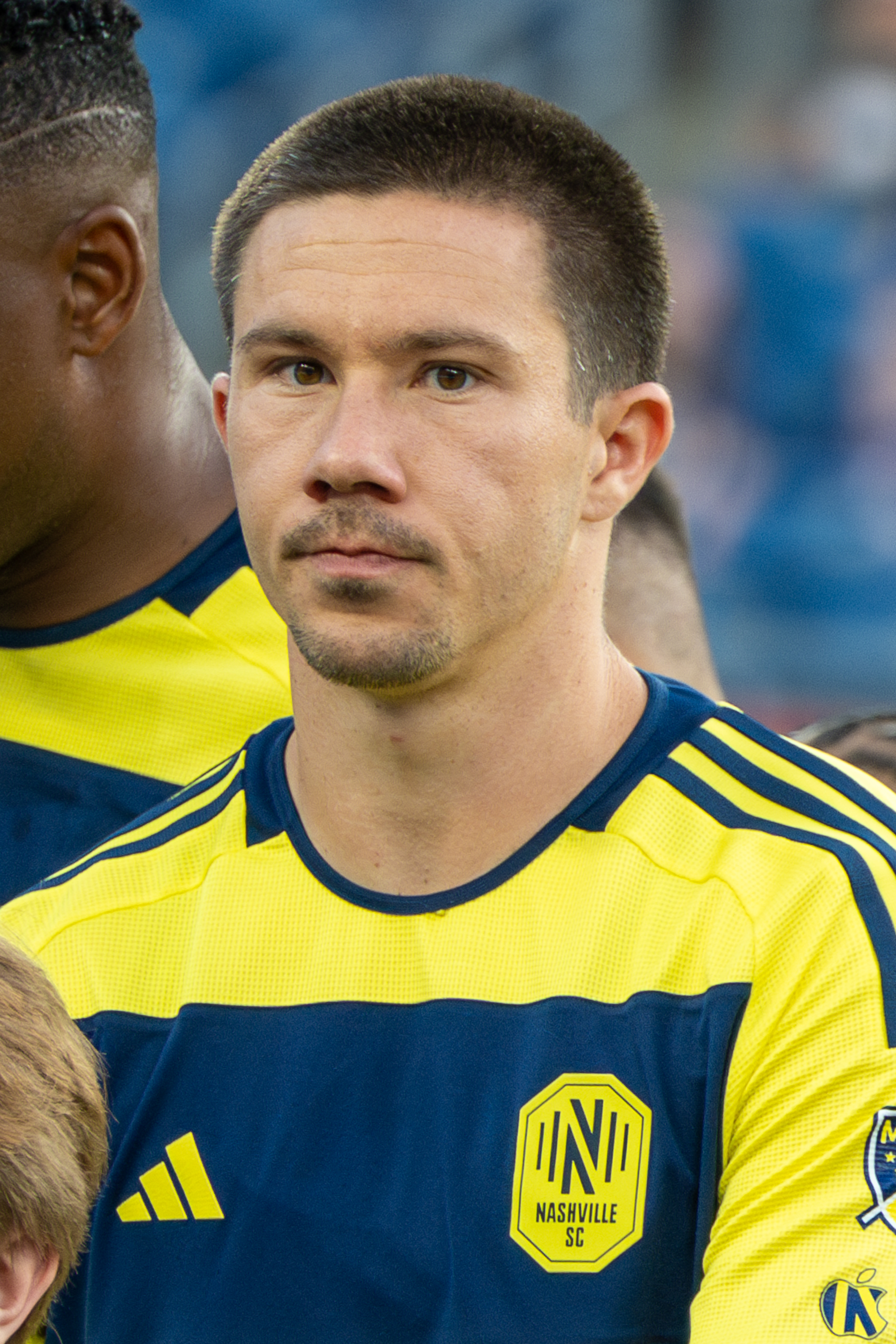
- Muyl with Nashville SC in 2025

Personal information
- Full name: Alexandre Burke Muyl
- Date of birth: September 30, 1995 (age 31)
- Place of birth: New York City, New York, United States
- Height: 5 ft 11 in (1.80 m)
- Position: Winger

Team information
- Current team: Nashville SC
- Number: 19

Youth career
- 2001–2009: Manhattan Kickers
- 2009–2010: BW Gottschee
- 2010–2011: New York Cosmos
- 2011–2013: New York Red Bulls

College career
Years	Team	Apps	(Gls)
2013–2015	Georgetown Hoyas	62	(12)

Senior career*
Years	Team	Apps	(Gls)
2015	New York Red Bulls U-23	8	(1)
2016–2020	New York Red Bulls	113	(11)
2016–2020	New York Red Bulls II	9	(1)
2020–	Nashville SC	145	(11)

International career^{‡}
2010–2012	United States U17		
2013	United States U18	3	(1)
- * Club domestic league appearances and goals as of October 23, 2024 ‡ National team caps and goals as of December 22, 2015

Alexandre Burke Muyl (born September 30, 1995) is an American professional soccer player who plays as a winger for Major League Soccer club Nashville SC.

== Early career ==
Muyl was raised by French immigrant parents in Manhattan, New York and attended Bard High School Early College on the Lower East Side. Muyl played in the New York Red Bulls Academy system and later trained with the U.S. national team residency program at Bradenton. While with the Red Bulls' academy, Muyl won two national championships as a member of the U-16 and U-18 squads, and was the team's top scorer during both seasons. He played at college level for three years at Georgetown University, appearing in 62 matches scoring 12 goals and tallying 25 assists. He led the team in assists in each of his three seasons.

== Club career ==
=== New York Red Bulls ===
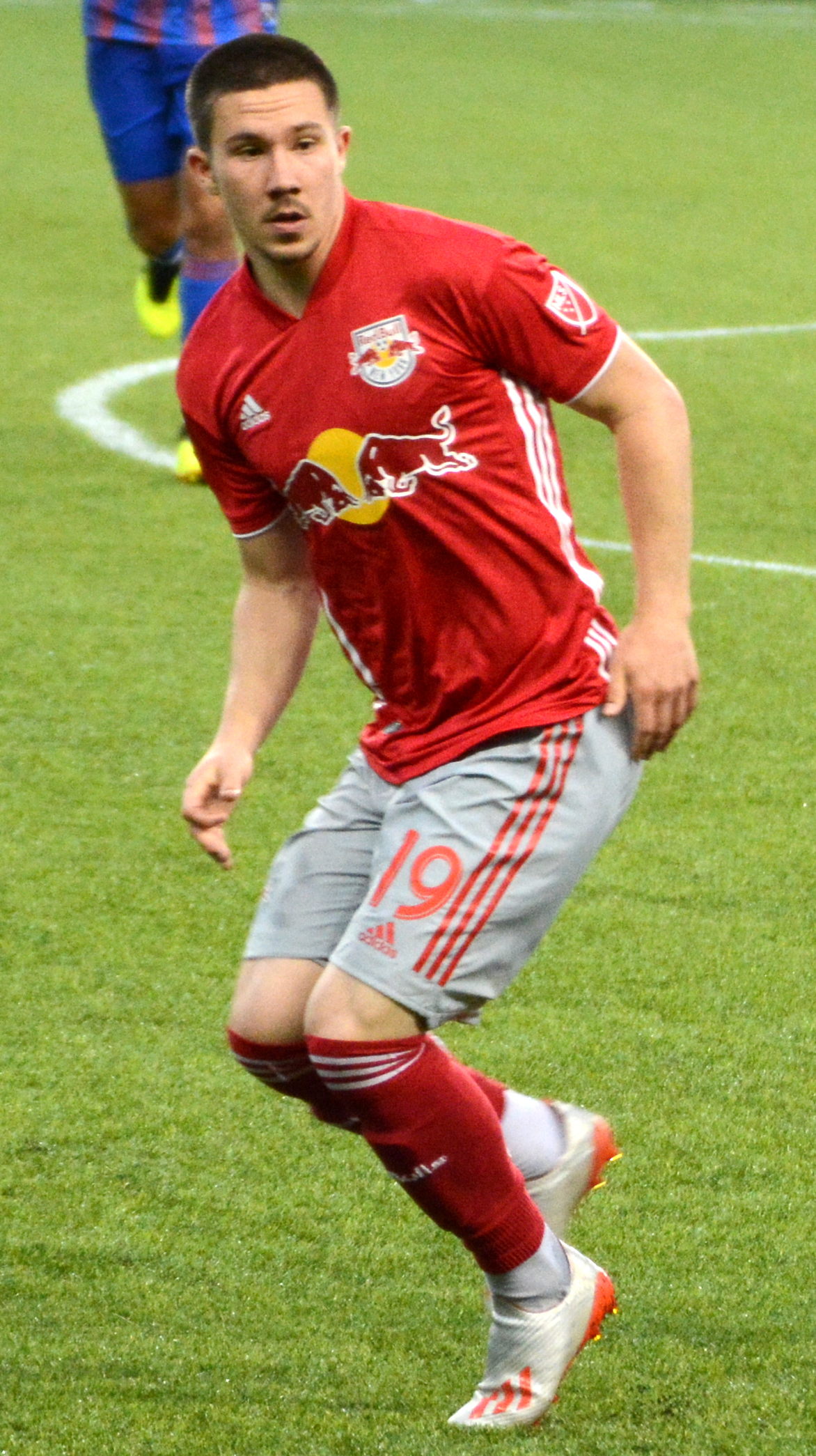
Muyl with the New York Red Bulls in 2019

On December 22, 2015, Muyl signed a Homegrown Contract with the New York Red Bulls. He joined former Georgetown teammate, Brandon Allen and former academy and New York Red Bulls II players, Derrick Etienne and Tyler Adams as the fourth homegrown player signing in the 2015 season. Muyl made his professional debut for New York Red Bulls II on March 26, appearing as a starter in a 2–2 draw against Toronto FC II.

On April 9 against Sporting Kansas City; Muyl made his first MLS appearance coming on in the 85th minute for Dax McCarty. The following day he scored his first goal as a professional, helping New York Red Bulls II to a 4–0 victory over Bethlehem Steel FC. During a 4–0 victory against FC Dallas on April 29; Muyl recorded his first MLS assist, setting up Felipe for the final goal of the match. Muyl scored his first MLS goal in a 7–0 Hudson River Derby victory against New York City FC on May 21, 2016. He was the first player from the New York metropolitan area to score in the derby. On June 15, he made his first U.S. Open Cup appearance in a 1–0 victory against the Rochester Rhinos. After a strong defensive effort in the Hudson River Derby, Muyl was voted to his first ever MLS Team of the Week appearance. He was lauded by many for shutting down Jack Harrison and played a crucial role in the Red Bulls' 4–1 victory. Sports Illustrated also recognized Muyl for his performance and named his as their Defensive Player of the Week. On August 3, Muyl made his first CONCACAF Champions League appearance and scored his first goal in the competition in a 3–0 victory against Antigua GFC.

=== Nashville SC ===
On August 13, 2020, Muyl was traded to Nashville SC in exchange for Nashville's 2020 and 2021 international picks, as well as an additional $50,000 in General Allocation Money in 2021 if Muyl meets certain performance-based metrics.

== International career ==
In 2013, Muyl was named to the United States U-18 squad to participate in the 2013 Milk Cup in Northern Ireland. He has also been called into the U-20 and U-23 camps and was part of the residency program.

== Career statistics ==
As of match played October 19, 2024

Appearances and goals by club, season and competition
Club	Season	League			U.S. Open Cup		Continental		Other		Total	
Club	Season	Division	Apps	Goals	Apps	Goals	Apps	Goals	Apps	Goals	Apps	Goals
New York Red Bulls	2016	MLS	27	2	1	0	3 (Note: Appearance(s) in CONCACAF Champions League)	1	2 (Note: Appearance(s) in MLS Cup Playoffs)	0	33	3
New York Red Bulls	2017	MLS	30	3	4	0	1	0	1	0	36	3
New York Red Bulls	2018	MLS	30	3	1	0	5	0	4	1	40	4
New York Red Bulls	2019	MLS	24	3	1	0	3	0	1	0	29	3
New York Red Bulls	2020	MLS	2	0	—		—		—		2	0
New York Red Bulls	Total		113	11	7	0	12	1	8	1	140	13
New York Red Bulls II	2016	USL	5	1	—		—		—		5	1
New York Red Bulls II	2017	USL	1	0	—		—		—		1	0
New York Red Bulls II	2018	USL	2	0	—		—		—		2	0
New York Red Bulls II	2020	USL	1	0	—		—		—		1	0
New York Red Bulls II	Total		9	1	—		—		—		9	1
Nashville SC	2020	MLS	18	0	—		—		3	0	21	0
Nashville SC	2021	MLS	32	3	—		—		2	0	34	3
Nashville SC	2022	MLS	29	2	3	0	—		0	0	32	2
Nashville SC	2023	MLS	32	1	3	2	—		8 (Note: Six appearances and one goal in Leagues Cup, two appearances in MLS Cup Playoffs)	1	43	4
Nashville SC	2024	MLS	34	5	—		4 (Note: Appearances in CONCACAF Champions Cup)	0	2 (Note: Appearances in Leagues Cup)	0	40	5
Nashville SC	Total		145	11	6	2	4	0	15	1	170	14
Career total			267	23	13	2	16	1	23	2	319	28

== Honors ==
New York Red Bulls II

- USL Cup: 2016

New York Red Bulls

- Supporters' Shield: 2018

Nashville SC

- U.S. Open Cup: 2025

== Personal life ==
Muyl is childhood friends with actor Timothée Chalamet.
