= Jacob Shaffelburg =

Canadian soccer player (born 1999)

- Shaffelburg with Los Angeles FC in 2026

Personal information
- Full name: Jacob Everett Shaffelburg
- Date of birth: November 26, 1999 (age 26)
- Place of birth: Kentville, Nova Scotia, Canada
- Height: 1.78 m (5 ft 10 in)
- Position: Winger

Team information
- Current team: Los Angeles FC
- Number: 18

Youth career
- Valley United SC
- 2012–2014: FC Nashville Heroes
- 2014: Sporting Kansas City
- Manhattan SC
- 2016–2019: Toronto FC

Senior career*
Years	Team	Apps	(Gls)
2017	Toronto FC III	1	(0)
2018	Black Rock FC	7	(8)
2019	Toronto FC II	15	(2)
2019–2022	Toronto FC	46	(3)
2021–2022	→ Toronto FC II (loan)	2	(0)
2022	→ Nashville SC (loan)	8	(2)
2023–2025	Nashville SC	74	(9)
2026–	Los Angeles FC	21	(0)

International career^{‡}
2020–	Canada	39	(8)
- * Club domestic league appearances and goals as of November 7, 2026 ‡ National team caps and goals as of October 6, 2026

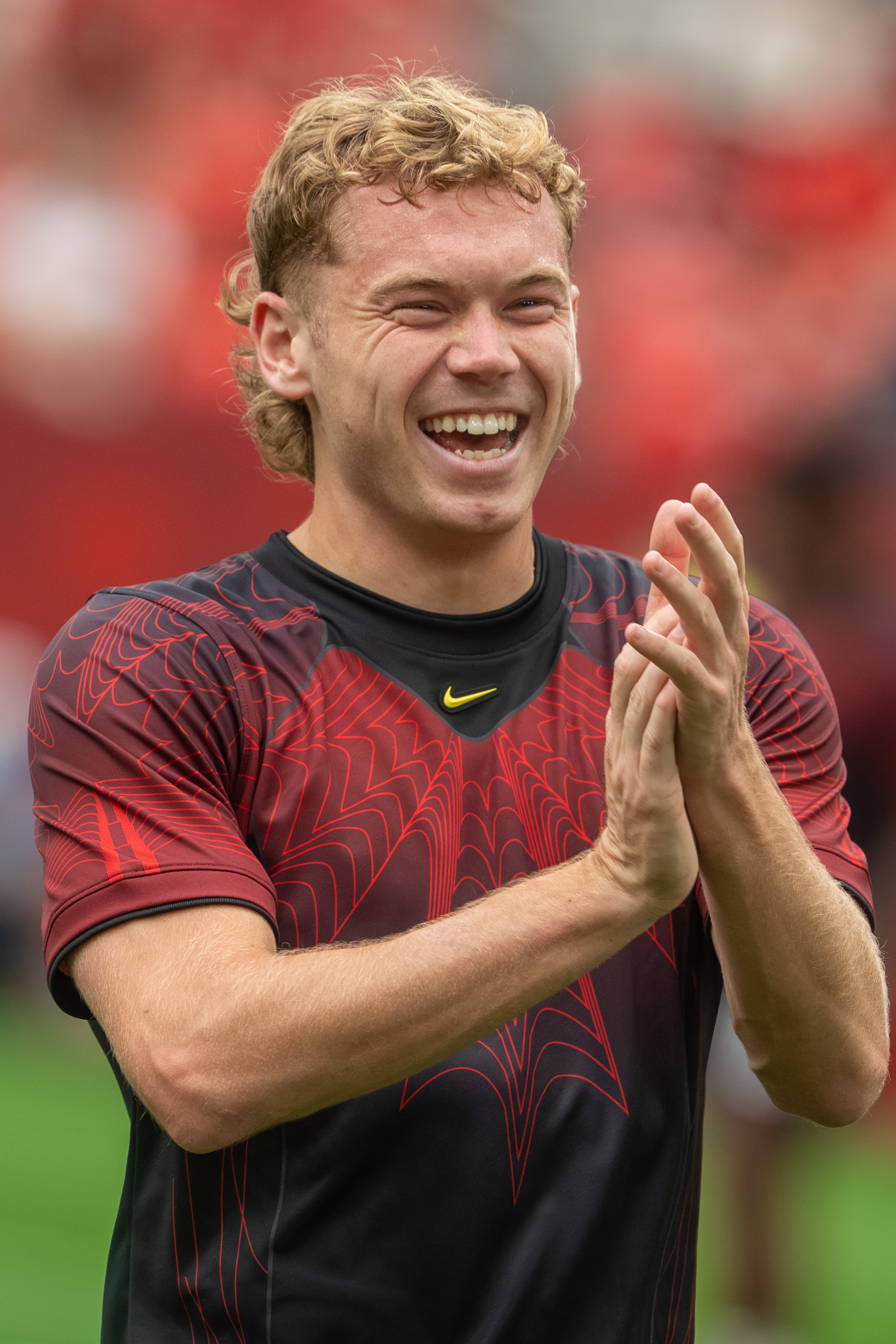
Shaffelburg with Canada in 2026

Jacob Everett Shaffelburg (born November 26, 1999) is a Canadian professional soccer player who plays as a winger for Major League Soccer club Los Angeles FC and the Canada national team.

== Early life ==
Shaffelburg played youth soccer for Valley United SC and Team Nova Scotia. In 2012, he joined FC Nashville Heroes, where he played in the 2012 U.S. Club Soccer National Cup. In January 2014, he joined the Sporting Kansas City Academy, where he played for a month. Shaffelburg demonstrated dominance in cross country running and track and field in his middle school years. He won the NSSAF junior boys 3000m in June 2014 with a spectacular sub 10 minute performance. College scouts still speculate what levels he could have reached if he stuck with running.

At age 15, he began attending high school in Massachusetts at the Berkshire School, where he played for their highly regarded soccer program. He played an instrumental part in the team, scoring four goals in two games in the NEPSAC playoffs his senior year (2018), helping Berkshire win their fifth title in seven years and he was named 2017–18 Gatorade Massachusetts Boys Soccer Player of the Year. While in the US, he also played youth soccer with Manhattan SC where he won U.S. Club Soccer U-16 National Championship in 2016.

He joined the Toronto FC Academy in 2016. He appeared in a friendly for the HFX Wanderers FC Atlantic Selects team in 2018 against Fortuna Düsseldorf's U-21 team, where he scored a goal. He had originally committed to the University of Virginia on a soccer scholarship, but ultimately decided to sign a professional contract instead.

== Club career ==
=== Toronto FC II ===
He played a game with Toronto FC III in League1 Ontario in 2017.

=== Black Rock ===
In 2018, he played with Black Rock FC in the Premier Development League. He finished as the team's leading scorer with eight goals, tied with Ifunanyachi Achara.

=== Toronto FC ===
In November 2018, he signed his first professional contract with Toronto FC II and began the 2019 season with them in USL League One.

Shaffelburg made his first appearance for Toronto FC in the 2019 CONCACAF Champions League on February 19, 2019, and then signed with Toronto FC as a Homegrown Player on June 21, 2019. He made his first MLS appearance the following day, playing 31 minutes against FC Dallas in Frisco, Texas. Four days later, on June 26, he had his first start for Toronto FC at BMO Field scoring an assist in a 3–2 win against Atlanta United FC, setting up the fastest goal in TFC history only 29 seconds into the game. Shaffelburg would quickly find himself in the starting lineup shortly after signing, earning rave reviews for his pace from the coaching staff. Teammate Richie Laryea, who joined Toronto FC from Orlando City in 2019, has said that Shaffelburg's rise coincided with several senior players departing for Gold Cup duty that summer, opening a window for younger players to make an impression, and that Shaffelburg's pace and left foot stood out immediately.

He scored his first goal in the 74th minute on May 15, 2021, in a 1–1 draw against New York City. On September 3, he was loaned to Toronto FC II. Upon completion of the 2021 season, Shaffelburg's option for the 2022 season would be picked up by Toronto. He went on a short loan to the second team again in 2022. Shaffelburg's playing time decreased significantly in 2022 following the arrivals of Italian wingers Lorenzo Insigne and Federico Bernardeschi; he has since said he was regularly left out of both squads in intra-squad training scrimmages during this period and doubted whether he would continue playing professionally, at points considering a move back to Nova Scotia to play for the Halifax Wanderers FC to be closer to his family.

=== Nashville SC ===
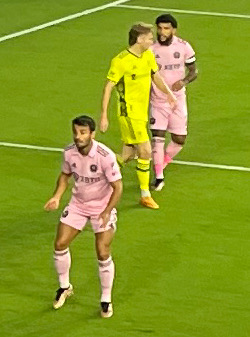
Shaffelburg (in yellow) playing for Nashville SC 2023

In August 2022, Shaffelburg joined Nashville SC on loan for the remainder of the 2022 season, with an option for a permanent transfer in 2023. He made his debut for Nashville on August 21 against FC Dallas and scored a goal in a 4–0 victory. After the season, Nashville exercised the purchase option for the 2023 season and signed him to a four-year contract extension with a club option for 2027. Shaffelburg has since described the move to Nashville as a turning point in his career, saying "Nashville saved my career." At Nashville, his direct, high-intensity playing style earned him a following among Geodis Park supporters, who nicknamed his blond mullet the "Tennessee Waterslide." During the 2024 CONCACAF Champions Cup round of 16, Shaffelburg scored twice in a match against Inter Miami that featured Lionel Messi, Luis Suárez, and Sergio Busquets.

=== Los Angeles FC ===
On December 29, 2025, Shaffelburg was acquired by Los Angeles FC from Nashville SC for $1,000,000 in General Allocation Money (GAM).

== International career ==
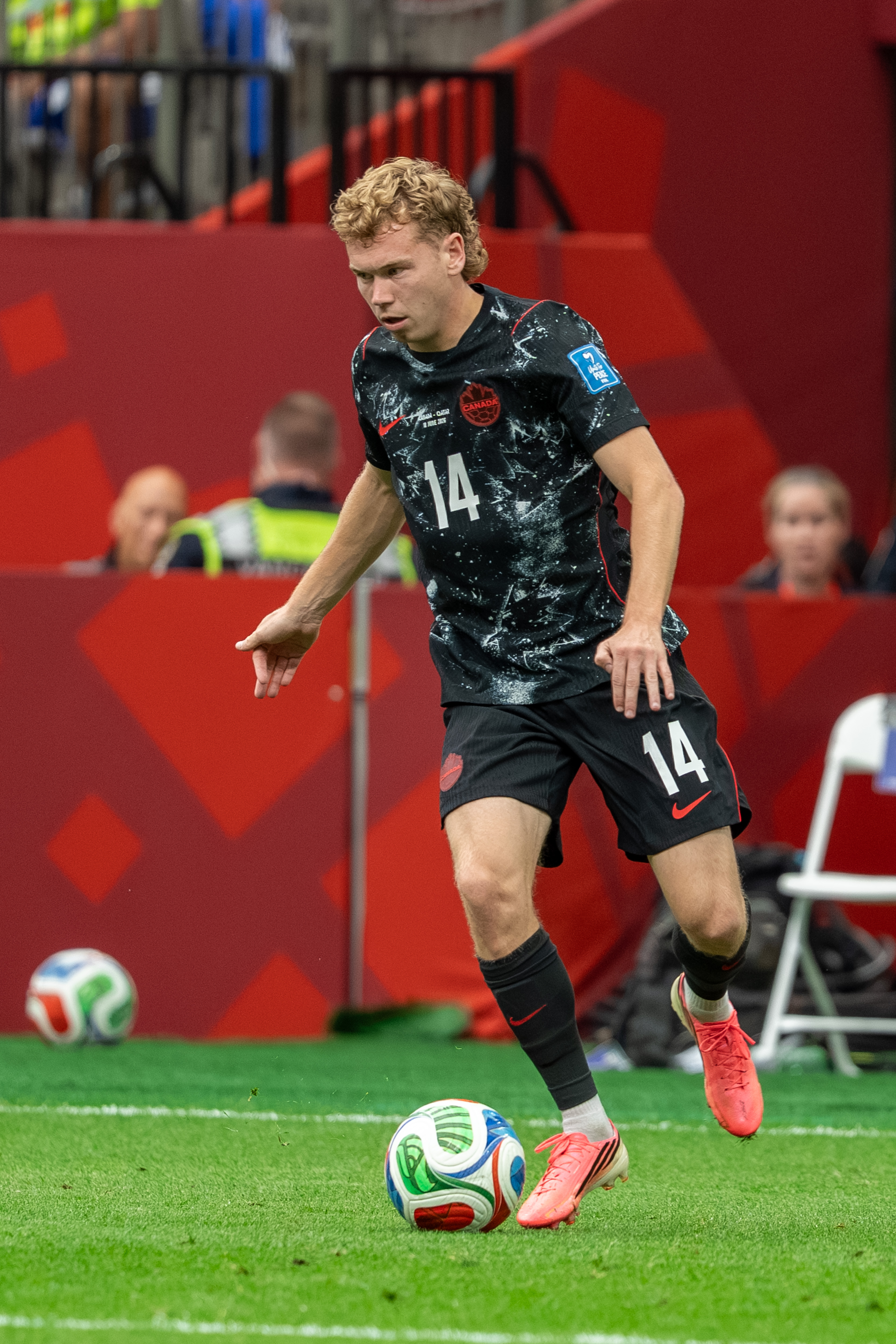
Shaffelburg with Canada at the 2026 FIFA World Cup

=== Youth ===
Shaffelburg was named to the Canadian U-23 provisional roster for the 2020 CONCACAF Men's Olympic Qualifying Championship on February 26, 2020.

=== Senior ===
Shaffelburg received his first senior international call-up to Canada on January 3, 2020, for matches against Barbados and Iceland. On January 10, 2020, he made his debut as a substitute against Barbados.

In June 2023, Shaffelburg was called up to Canada's squad for the 2023 CONCACAF Gold Cup. On July 9 he scored his first goal for Canada during the quarter-finals of the tournament against the United States. The match ended in a 2–2 draw, though Canada lost 3–2 in the ensuing penalty shoot-out.

In June 2024, Shaffelburg was named in Canada's 26-man roster for the 2024 Copa América. In the tournament opener, Shaffelburg troubled Argentina's back line for extended stretches of the match without scoring. In Canada's second group match of the tournament, he assisted Jonathan David, who scored Canada's first ever goal at the tournament in a 1–0 victory over Peru; this was Canada's first ever win in the competition. In their quarter-final victory against Venezuela, he scored for Canada in a 1–1 draw, converting on his weaker right foot after David drew defenders and squared the ball to him; the goal, and his tournament performance broadly, earned Shaffelburg the nickname "Maritime Messi". Canada was defeated in the semi-final against Argentina.

Following the appointment of Jesse Marsch as Canada's head coach in May 2024, Shaffelburg became a regular starter under the new manager, who has described him as a "big part of what we do" and praised his willingness to "wear his heart on his sleeve." In September 2025, he scored the opening goal in a 2–1 win over the United States at Children's Mercy Park, Canada's first victory over the U.S. men's national team on American soil since 1957, and later scored twice against Suriname in a CONCACAF Nations League quarter-final.

At the 2025 CONCACAF Gold Cup quarter-finals, Shaffelburg was sent off for a second yellow card in the first half of a match against Guatemala after a collision with defender Stheven Robles, having earlier given Canada a 1–0 lead; Canada, reduced to ten men, was eliminated after Guatemala equalized and won the ensuing penalty shoot-out. It was the first red card of Shaffelburg's career, and he has since called it "the lowest point" of his career.

In May 2026, Shaffelburg was selected for Canada's squad for the 2026 FIFA World Cup.

== Personal life ==
Shaffelburg was born in Kentville, Nova Scotia, but grew up in the nearby village of Port Williams, home to about 1,100 people, and is the youngest of three siblings; his sister, Jessica, played college soccer for Jacksonville University, and his brother, Zach, played for Acadia University before becoming a rheumatologist in Lunenburg. He has been nicknamed Maritime Messi. He and his wife, Robyne, have two children, daughter Daisy and son Baker; Shaffelburg has described becoming a father as a "surreal" change for the better.

== Career statistics ==
=== Club ===
As of match played November 7, 2026

Appearances and goals by club, season and competition
Club	Season	League			National cup (Note: Includes Canadian Championship, U.S. Open Cup)		Continental		Other		Total	
Club	Season	Division	Apps	Goals	Apps	Goals	Apps	Goals	Apps	Goals	Apps	Goals
Toronto FC III	2017	League1 Ontario	1	0	—		—		—		1	0
Black Rock FC	2018	PDL	7	8	—		—		—		7	8
Toronto FC II	2019	USL League One	15	2	—		—		—		15	2
Toronto FC	2019	Major League Soccer	10	0	2	0	1 (Note: Appearance(s) in CONCACAF Champions League/Cup)	0	—		13	0
Toronto FC	2020	Major League Soccer	4 (Note: Includes two appearances in MLS is Back Tournament group stage)	0	—		—		1 (Note: Appearance in MLS is Back Tournament knockout stage)	0	5	0
Toronto FC	2021	Major League Soccer	19	3	3	1	4	0	—		26	4
Toronto FC	2022	Major League Soccer	13	0	3 (Note: Includes appearance in 2020 Canadian Championship final (played in 2022))	0	—		—		16	0
Toronto FC	Total		46	3	8	1	5	0	1	0	60	4
Nashville SC (loan)	2022	Major League Soccer	8	2	—		—		1 (Note: Appearance(s) in MLS Cup playoffs)	0	9	2
Nashville SC	2023	Major League Soccer	28	3	3	0	—		8 (Note: Six appearances and one goal in Leagues Cup, two appearances in MLS Cup playoffs)	1	39	4
Nashville SC	2024	Major League Soccer	23	2	—		4	3	2 (Note: Appearances in Leagues Cup)	0	29	6
Nashville SC	2025	Major League Soccer	23	4	3	0	—		3	0	29	4
Nashville SC	Nashville total		82	11	6	0	4	3	14	1	106	15
Los Angeles FC	2026	Major League Soccer	21	0	—		4	0	3	0	28	0
Career total			172	24	14	1	13	3	18	1	217	29

=== International ===
As of match played October 6, 2026

Appearances and goals by national team and year
National team	Year	Apps	Goals
Canada	2020	1	0
Canada	2021	2	0
Canada	2022	1	0
Canada	2023	3	1
Canada	2024	13	5
Canada	2025	11	0
Canada	2026	8	2
Total		39	8

Scores and results list Canada's goal tally first.

List of international goals scored by Jacob Shaffelburg
No.	Date	Venue	Cap	Opponent	Score	Result	Competition
1	July 9, 2023	TQL Stadium, Cincinnati, United States	7	United States	2–1	2–2 (2–3 p)	2023 CONCACAF Gold Cup
2	March 23, 2024	Toyota Stadium, Frisco, United States	8	Trinidad and Tobago	2–0	2–0	2024 Copa América qualifying play-offs
3	July 5, 2024	AT&T Stadium, Arlington, United States	14	Venezuela	1–0	1–1 (4–3 p)	2024 Copa América
4	September 7, 2024	Children's Mercy Park, Kansas City, United States	17	United States	1–0	2–1	Friendly
5	19 November 2024	BMO Field, Toronto, Canada	20	Suriname	2–0	3–0	2024-25 CONCACAF Nations League
6	19 November 2024	BMO Field, Toronto, Canada	20	Suriname	3–0	3–0	2024-25 CONCACAF Nations League
7	3 October 2026	Stade Saputo, Montreal, Canada	38	Peru	1–0	2–0	Friendly
8	3 October 2026	Stade Saputo, Montreal, Canada	38	Peru	2–0	2–0	Friendly

== Honours ==
Toronto FC

- Canadian Championship: 2020

Nashville SC

- U.S. Open Cup: 2025

Individual

- Canadian Championship Best Young Canadian Player Award: 2021
