= 2026 Major League Soccer season =

31st season of Major League Soccer

Major League Soccer
- Season: 2026
- Dates: February 21 – November 7 (regular season); November 19 – December 18 (playoffs)
- Teams: 30
- Supporters' Shield: Nashville SC (1st shield)
- Champions Cup (United States): Nashville SC; Inter Miami CF; New England Revolution; St. Louis City SC
- Champions Cup (Canada): Vancouver Whitecaps FC
- Matches: 510
- Goals: 1,658 (3.25 per match)
- Top goalscorer: Lionel Messi (26 goals)
- Best goalkeeper: Brian Schwake (16 clean sheets)
- Biggest home win: Vancouver 6–0 Minnesota (March 15); Los Angeles 6–0 Orlando (April 4); Portland 6–0 Kansas City (May 9); Miami 7–1 Montréal (August 29)
- Biggest away win: San Diego 0–5 Philadelphia (September 13)
- Highest scoring: 10 goals: Miami 6–4 Philadelphia (May 24)
- Longest winning run: 8 matches: Philadelphia (August 29 – October 14)
- Longest unbeaten run: 19 matches: St. Louis (May 9 – October 14)
- Longest winless run: 13 matches: Seattle (May 16 – September 19)
- Longest losing run: 8 matches: Seattle (May 16 – August 19)
- Highest attendance: 75,824; COL 2–3 MIA (April 18)
- Lowest attendance: 10,115; DC 2–1 CLB (September 9)
- Total attendance: 11,253,623
- Average attendance: 22,066
- All statistics correct as of November 7, 2026.

The 2026 Major League Soccer season is the ongoing 31st season of Major League Soccer (MLS), the top professional soccer league in the United States and Canada. It is also the 48th overall season of a national first-division men's soccer league in the United States overseen by the United States Soccer Federation. The league has 30 clubs that are divided into the Eastern and Western conferences, each with 15 teams.

The regular season ran from February 21 to November 7, with 34 matches for each team, primarily against opponents in the same conference. A six-week break was taken from May 25 to July 16 for the 2026 FIFA World Cup, which was hosted in the United States, Canada, and Mexico. The playoffs are scheduled to be played during an uninterrupted period, beginning on November 19 and culminating in MLS Cup 2026, the league's postseason championship, on December 18. The 2026 season will be the final full season played under the spring–autumn format, as MLS plans to transition to a summer–spring format beginning with the 2027–28 season; a shortened season with 14 matches is scheduled to be played in early 2027.

All MLS matches during the regular season and playoffs are planned to be broadcast on Apple TV, an online streaming service operated by Apple. It replaces MLS Season Pass, which was a standalone streaming service by Apple, used from 2023 to 2025.

Inter Miami CF enters the season as reigning MLS Cup champions, while the Philadelphia Union entered as holders of the Supporters' Shield. Nashville SC won the Supporters' Shield for the first time, earning a league-record 77 points.

== Teams ==
MLS had been expanding at the rate of nearly one team a year since 2005, when Real Salt Lake joined the league, through 2025, with the introduction of San Diego FC. Commissioner Don Garber stated that the league would put a pause on expansion once reaching thirty teams until after the 2026 FIFA World Cup. As such, the 2026 MLS season represents the first season played without an expansion team added or planned in over twenty years.

=== Stadiums and locations ===
Locations of teams for the 2026 Major League Soccer season
Western Conference Eastern Conference

Nu Stadium opened on April 4, 2026, as the new home stadium of Inter Miami CF. In addition to their normal home venues, some teams have scheduled matches at other stadiums to increase capacity.

Team	Stadium	Capacity
Atlanta United FC	Mercedes-Benz Stadium	42,500
Austin FC	Q2 Stadium	20,738
CF Montréal	Saputo Stadium	19,619
Charlotte FC	Bank of America Stadium	38,000
Chicago Fire FC	Soldier Field	24,955
Colorado Rapids	Dick's Sporting Goods Park	18,061
Columbus Crew	ScottsMiracle-Gro Field	20,011
D.C. United	Audi Field	20,000
FC Cincinnati	TQL Stadium	26,000
FC Dallas	Toyota Stadium	20,500
Houston Dynamo FC	Shell Energy Stadium	22,039
Inter Miami CF	Nu Stadium	26,700
LA Galaxy	Dignity Health Sports Park	27,000
Los Angeles FC	BMO Stadium	22,000
Minnesota United FC	Allianz Field	19,400
Nashville SC	Geodis Park	30,000
New England Revolution	Gillette Stadium	20,000
New York City FC	Yankee Stadium Citi Field	28,743 41,992
New York Red Bulls	Sports Illustrated Stadium	25,000
Orlando City SC	Inter&Co Stadium	25,500
Philadelphia Union	Subaru Park	18,500
Portland Timbers	Providence Park	25,218
Real Salt Lake	America First Field	20,213
San Diego FC	Snapdragon Stadium	35,000
San Jose Earthquakes	PayPal Park	18,000
Seattle Sounders FC	Lumen Field	37,722
Sporting Kansas City	Sporting Park	18,467
St. Louis City SC	Energizer Park	22,423
Toronto FC	BMO Field	28,351
Vancouver Whitecaps FC	BC Place	22,120

1. Non-soccer specific stadium and artificially reduced capacity. Capacity may be increased to full capacity if demand requires.

=== Personnel and sponsorships ===
Note: All teams use Adidas as universal kit manufacturer. As part of Apple's broadcast contract, all MLS kits include Apple TV+ as a sleeve sponsor.

Team	Head coach	Captain	Shirt sponsor	Sleeve sponsor	Back sponsor
Atlanta United FC	(Argentina) Gerardo Martino	(Paraguay) Miguel Almirón	American Family Insurance	Emory Healthcare	—
Austin FC	(United States) Davy Arnaud (interim)	(Spain) Ilie Sánchez	Yeti	Siete Foods	—
Charlotte FC	(England) Dean Smith	(England) Ashley Westwood	Ally	Rugs.com	Frigidaire
Chicago Fire FC	(United States) Gregg Berhalter	(England) Jack Elliott	Carvana	Magellan Corporation	—
FC Cincinnati	(United States) Pat Noonan	(United States) Miles Robinson	Mercy Health	Kroger	—
Colorado Rapids	(England) Matt Wells	(United States) Keegan Rosenberry	UCHealth	Kiewit	—
Columbus Crew	(France) Laurent Courtois (interim)	(United States) Sean Zawadzki	Nationwide	DHL Supply Chain	—
FC Dallas	(United States) Eric Quill	(Brazil) Ramiro	Children's Health (Home) UT Southwestern (Away)	—	—
D.C. United	(Switzerland) René Weiler	(United States) Lucas Bartlett	Guidehouse	Fruitist	—
Houston Dynamo FC	(United States) Ben Olsen	(Brazil) Artur	MD Anderson	—	Dude Wipes
Inter Miami CF	(Argentina) Kily González	(Argentina) Lionel Messi	Royal Caribbean	Lowe's	Nubank
LA Galaxy	(United States) Greg Vanney	(Japan) Maya Yoshida	Herbalife	RBC	—
Los Angeles FC	(Spain) Xavi Tamarit (interim)	(United States) Aaron Long	BMO Bank (Note: Rockstar sponsors training and special event jerseys)	Ford	El Mexicano
Minnesota United FC	(New Zealand) Cameron Knowles	(New Zealand) Michael Boxall	Target (Note: Blue Cross and Blue Shield of Minnesota sponsors training and special event jerseys)	NutriSource	—
CF Montréal	(France) Philippe Eullaffroy (interim)	(Canada) Samuel Piette	Bank of Montreal	Telus	—
Nashville SC	(United States) B.J. Callaghan	(Germany) Hany Mukhtar	Renasant Bank (Note: Vanderbilt Health sponsors training and special event jerseys)	Hyundai	—
New England Revolution	(Serbia) Marko Mitrović	(Spain) Carles Gil	Gillette	—	—
New York City FC	(Netherlands) Pascal Jansen	(Brazil) Thiago Martins	Etihad Airways (Note: Montefiore Einstein sponsors training and special event jerseys)	Judi Health	—
New York Red Bulls	(United States) Michael Bradley	(Sweden) Emil Forsberg	Red Bull	OANDA	—
Orlando City SC	(Argentina) Martín Perelman (interim)	(Sweden) Robin Jansson	Orlando Health	Exploria	—
Philadelphia Union	(United States) Ryan Richter (interim)	(United States) Alejandro Bedoya	Bimbo Bakeries USA	Independence Blue Cross	—
Portland Timbers	(Spain) Martí Cifuentes	(Colombia) Diego Chará	Bank of America (Note: Dutch Bros. Coffee sponsors training and special event jerseys)	Tillamook	—
Real Salt Lake	(United States) Pablo Mastroeni	(Brazil) Rafael Cabral	Select Health	Intermountain Health	—
San Diego FC	(United States) Mikey Varas	(Denmark) Jeppe Tverskov	DirecTV	Adriana's Insurance	—
San Jose Earthquakes	(United States) Bruce Arena	(Guinea-Bissau) Ronaldo Vieira	El Camino Health	Apollo	—
Seattle Sounders FC	(United States) Brian Schmetzer	(Switzerland) Stefan Frei	Providence (Note: Providence Swedish sponsors training and special event jerseys)	Emerald Queen Casino	—
Sporting Kansas City	(Switzerland) Raphaël Wicky	(Canada) Zorhan Bassong	Compass Minerals	Saint Luke's	—
St. Louis City SC	(France) Yoann Damet	(Switzerland) Roman Bürki	Purina	BJC HealthCare	—
Toronto FC	(United States) Robin Fraser	(Canada) Jonathan Osorio	Bank of Montreal	LG	—
Vancouver Whitecaps FC	(Denmark) Jesper Sørensen	(Scotland) Ryan Gauld	Telus (Note: Bank of Montreal sponsors training and special event jerseys)	BLG	—

=== Coaching changes ===
Team	Outgoing coach	Manner of departure	Date of vacancy	Position in table	Incoming coach	Date of appointment
Atlanta United FC	(Norway) Ronny Deila	Fired	October 19, 2025	Pre-season	(Argentina) Gerardo Martino	November 6, 2025
Colorado Rapids	(United States) Chris Armas	End of contract	October 27, 2025	Pre-season	(England) Matt Wells	December 23, 2025
New York Red Bulls	(Germany) Sandro Schwarz	Mutual consent	October 27, 2025	Pre-season	(United States) Michael Bradley	December 15, 2025
New England Revolution	(Uruguay) Pablo Moreira	End of interim period	November 7, 2025	Pre-season	(Serbia) Marko Mitrović	November 7, 2025
Los Angeles FC	(United States) Steve Cherundolo	Mutual consent (Note: Announcement was made originally on April 18, 2025)	December 1, 2025	Pre-season	(Canada) Marc Dos Santos	December 5, 2025
Columbus Crew	(France) Wilfried Nancy	Signed by Celtic	December 3, 2025	Pre-season	(Sweden) Henrik Rydström	December 31, 2025
St. Louis City SC	(England) David Critchley	End of interim period	December 16, 2025	Pre-season	(France) Yoann Damet	December 16, 2025
Sporting Kansas City	(United States) Kerry Zavagnin	End of interim period	January 5, 2026	Pre-season	(Switzerland) Raphaël Wicky	January 5, 2026
Minnesota United FC	(Wales) Eric Ramsay	Signed by West Bromwich Albion	January 11, 2026	Pre-season	(New Zealand) Cameron Knowles	January 12, 2026
Orlando City SC	(Colombia) Óscar Pareja	Mutual consent	March 11, 2026	15th in East, 30th overall	(Argentina) Martín Perelman (interim)	March 11, 2026
CF Montréal	(Italy) Marco Donadel	Fired	April 12, 2026	15th in East, 29th overall	(France) Philippe Eullaffroy (interim)	April 12, 2026
Inter Miami CF	(Argentina) Javier Mascherano	Resigned	April 14, 2026	3rd in East, 10th overall	(Argentina) Guillermo Hoyos (interim)	April 14, 2026
Columbus Crew	(Sweden) Henrik Rydström	Fired	May 17, 2026	13th in East, 26th overall	(France) Laurent Courtois (interim)	May 17, 2026
Austin FC	(Spain) Nico Estévez	Fired	May 18, 2026	13th in West, 24th overall	(United States) Davy Arnaud (interim)	May 18, 2026
Portland Timbers	(England) Phil Neville	Mutual consent	May 25, 2026	13th in West, 23rd overall	(Republic of Ireland) Jack Cassidy (interim)	June 5, 2026
Philadelphia Union	(South Africa) Bradley Carnell	Mutual consent	May 27, 2026	15th in East, 30th overall	(United States) Ryan Richter (interim)	May 27, 2026
Portland Timbers	(Republic of Ireland) Jack Cassidy	End of interim period (Note: Announcement was made originally on July 21, 2026)	August 11, 2026	8th in West, 16th overall	(Spain) Martí Cifuentes	August 11, 2026
Inter Miami CF	(Argentina) Guillermo Hoyos	End of interim period (Note: Announcement was made originally on August 27, 2026)	September 15, 2026	2nd in East, 3rd overall	(Argentina) Kily González	September 15, 2026
Los Angeles FC	(Canada) Marc Dos Santos	Fired	September 27, 2026	6th in West, 11th overall	(Spain) Xavi Tamarit (interim)	October 1, 2026

== Regular season ==
=== Conference standings ===
MLS Eastern Conference table (2026)
Pos	Team	Pld	W	L	T	GF	GA	GD	Pts	Qualification
1	Nashville SC	34	23	3	8	71	25	+46	77	Qualification for round one and the CONCACAF Champions Cup round one
2	Inter Miami CF	34	16	6	12	80	59	+21	60	Qualification for round one
3	New England Revolution	34	18	12	4	55	47	+8	58	Qualification for round one
4	Chicago Fire FC	34	16	11	7	64	54	+10	55	Qualification for round one
5	Charlotte FC	34	15	10	9	66	51	+15	54	Qualification for round one
6	Philadelphia Union	34	14	12	8	66	52	+14	50	Qualification for round one
7	Columbus Crew	34	14	15	5	59	52	+7	47	Qualification for round one
8	Orlando City SC	34	13	14	7	63	78	−15	46	Qualification for the wild card round
9	FC Cincinnati	34	12	12	10	67	75	−8	46	Qualification for the wild card round
10	New York Red Bulls	34	12	16	6	48	62	−14	42	
11	New York City FC	34	10	12	12	49	45	+4	42	
12	Toronto FC	34	9	13	12	52	67	−15	39	
13	Atlanta United FC	34	9	19	6	43	60	−17	33	
14	D.C. United	34	7	15	12	39	61	−22	33	
15	CF Montréal	34	6	20	8	37	69	−32	26	

Source: MLS
Rules for classification: 1) points; 2) total wins; 3) total goal differential; 4) total goals scored; 5) fewer disciplinary points; 6) away goal differential; 7) away goals scored; 8) home goals differential; 9) home goals scored; 10) coin toss (2 clubs tied) or drawing of lots (≥3 clubs tied)

MLS Western Conference table (2026)
Pos	Team	Pld	W	L	T	GF	GA	GD	Pts	Qualification
1	Vancouver Whitecaps FC	34	19	8	7	74	34	+40	64	Qualification for round one and the CONCACAF Champions Cup round one
2	FC Dallas	34	16	8	10	62	51	+11	58	Qualification for round one
3	St. Louis City SC	34	15	10	9	59	48	+11	54	Qualification for round one
4	San Jose Earthquakes	34	14	10	10	57	51	+6	52	Qualification for round one
5	Houston Dynamo FC	34	14	11	9	43	43	0	51	Qualification for round one
6	Los Angeles FC	34	12	11	11	52	40	+12	47	Qualification for round one
7	Portland Timbers	34	13	14	7	62	61	+1	46	Qualification for round one
8	Seattle Sounders FC	34	12	12	10	44	46	−2	46	Qualification for the wild card round
9	Real Salt Lake	34	13	15	6	53	52	+1	45	Qualification for the wild card round
10	Minnesota United FC	34	11	12	11	56	58	−2	44	
11	LA Galaxy	34	11	12	11	50	57	−7	44	
12	Colorado Rapids	34	12	15	7	47	50	−3	43	
13	San Diego FC	34	9	14	11	57	63	−6	38	
14	Austin FC	34	8	16	10	42	65	−23	34	
15	Sporting Kansas City	34	7	22	5	40	81	−41	26	

Source: MLS
Rules for classification: 1) points; 2) total wins; 3) total goal differential; 4) total goals scored; 5) fewer disciplinary points; 6) away goal differential; 7) away goals scored; 8) home goals differential; 9) home goals scored; 10) coin toss (2 clubs tied) or drawing of lots (≥3 clubs tied)

=== Overall table ===
The leading team in this table won the Supporters' Shield.

Overall MLS standings table
Pos	Team	Pld	W	L	T	GF	GA	GD	Pts	Qualification
1	Nashville SC (S)	34	23	3	8	71	25	+46	77	Qualification for the CONCACAF Champions Cup round one (Note: As 2026 MLS Supporters' Shield champions)
2	Vancouver Whitecaps FC	34	19	8	7	74	34	+40	64	Qualification for the CONCACAF Champions Cup round one (Note: As Western Conference regular season winners)
3	Inter Miami CF	34	16	6	12	80	59	+21	60	Qualification for the CONCACAF Champions Cup round one (Note: As one of the next two highest-ranked clubs in 2026 MLS Supporters' Shield not already qualified)
4	New England Revolution	34	18	12	4	55	47	+8	58	Qualification for the CONCACAF Champions Cup round one
5	FC Dallas	34	16	8	10	62	51	+11	58	
6	Chicago Fire FC	34	16	11	7	64	54	+10	55	
7	Charlotte FC	34	15	10	9	66	51	+15	54	
8	St. Louis City SC (U)	34	15	10	9	59	48	+11	54	Qualification for the CONCACAF Champions Cup round one (Note: As winners of U.S. Open Cup)
9	San Jose Earthquakes	34	14	10	10	57	51	+6	52	
10	Houston Dynamo FC	34	14	11	9	43	43	0	51	
11	Philadelphia Union	34	14	12	8	66	52	+14	50	
12	Columbus Crew	34	14	15	5	59	52	+7	47	
13	Los Angeles FC	34	12	11	11	52	40	+12	47	
14	Portland Timbers	34	13	14	7	62	61	+1	46	
15	Orlando City SC	34	13	14	7	63	78	−15	46	
16	Seattle Sounders FC	34	12	12	10	44	46	−2	46	
17	FC Cincinnati	34	12	12	10	67	75	−8	46	
18	Real Salt Lake	34	13	15	6	53	52	+1	45	
19	Minnesota United FC	34	11	12	11	56	58	−2	44	
20	LA Galaxy	34	11	12	11	50	57	−7	44	
21	Colorado Rapids	34	12	15	7	47	50	−3	43	
22	New York Red Bulls	34	12	16	6	48	62	−14	42	
23	New York City FC	34	10	12	12	49	45	+4	42	
24	Toronto FC	34	9	13	12	52	67	−15	39	
25	San Diego FC	34	9	14	11	57	63	−6	38	
26	Austin FC	34	8	16	10	42	65	−23	34	
27	Atlanta United FC	34	9	19	6	43	60	−17	33	
28	D.C. United	34	7	15	12	39	61	−22	33	
29	Sporting Kansas City	34	7	22	5	40	81	−41	26	
30	CF Montréal	34	6	20	8	37	69	−32	26	

Source: MLS
Rules for classification: 1) points; 2) total wins; 3) total goal differential; 4) total goals scored; 5) fewer disciplinary points; 6) away goal differential; 7) away goals scored; 8) home goals differential; 9) home goals scored; 10) coin toss (2 clubs tied) or drawing of lots (≥3 clubs tied)
(S) Supporters' Shield winners; (U) U.S. Open Cup winners

=== Results table ===
Home \ Away	ATL	AUS	CHI	CIN	CLB	CLT	COL	DAL	DCU	HOU	LAX	LFC	MIA	MIN	MTL	NEW	NSH	NYC	NYR	ORL	PHI	POR	RSL	SEA	SDC	SJO	SKC	STL	TOR	VAN
Atlanta United FC			2–3	1–3	1–3	0–2			0–0		1–2		1–3		3–1	1–2	0–2	2–2	2–1	2–3	3–1		2–3				2–1		3–1	
Austin FC							1–1	1–2	1–0	2–0	1–2	0–0		2–2			1–4				1–1	0–2	1–2	3–1	3–3	1–1	1–2	2–0		1–2
Chicago Fire FC	1–0			2–3	3–4	2–1			1–2				1–1		3–0	1–2	1–0	2–1	1–3	2–2	1–3	2–1					5–0		2–1	3–1
FC Cincinnati	2–0		3–3		0–2	3–3			2–1				3–5		4–3	2–3	0–2	2–1	2–0	6–2	1–0			1–1		4–2			0–1	4–3
Columbus Crew	2–0		0–0	2–1		3–1	3–0		3–0		2–1		2–1	2–3	1–2	1–3	0–1	1–2	0–1	1–1	2–0								4–2	
Charlotte FC	2–2	3–1	0–1	2–2	3–1			3–2	3–1	0–0			0–0		4–0	1–0	1–2	0–1	6–1	4–0	2–1								3–1	
Colorado Rapids		1–0	2–4					1–2		6–2	4–1	1–0	2–3	2–2	1–0							2–0	1–0	3–3	1–0	1–1	2–0	0–1		1–0
FC Dallas		0–0			0–2		3–1			4–3	2–2	1–0		0–1			0–0					2–1	3–1	1–0	3–3	3–0	4–3	1–1	3–2	2–3
D.C. United	0–0		1–3	0–2	2–1	1–2		0–4				0–0	1–2		4–4	0–3	2–2	0–1	2–1	3–2	1–0							1–1	2–1	
Houston Dynamo FC		3–0	2–1	2–2			1–0	2–2	1–1		1–0	0–2		0–0								3–2	2–1	0–1	1–0	0–0	0–2	0–1		1–0
LA Galaxy		4–1				3–0	3–2	0–0		1–1		0–3		1–2		2–1		1–1				2–0	2–1	1–1	2–2	1–0	1–2	1–3		1–1
Los Angeles FC		3–1					0–0	1–0		1–4	2–2		3–0	1–3					2–0	6–0		1–1	3–1	1–0	0–1	1–4	4–0	2–0		1–1
Inter Miami CF	2–2	2–2	3–2	2–2	2–2	3–3			4–0						7–1	1–1	2–2	2–0	2–2	3–4	6–4	2–0			2–2				1–2	
Minnesota United FC	1–2	2–2		1–0			0–1	1–2		2–2	2–3	0–1								3–3		2–0	1–1	0–0	1–1	3–1	3–1	3–2		0–0
CF Montréal	0–3		0–2	3–1	0–2	1–2			1–1		2–2		0–1			2–2	0–2	1–0	4–1	2–0	1–2	2–2							0–0	0–2
New England Revolution	4–1		1–0	6–1	2–1	1–0			1–0	0–2			1–2	2–1	3–0		0–3	1–1	3–2	4–2	2–1			0–3					0–0	
Nashville SC	1–0		3–0	4–0	3–2	4–2			2–2			3–2	4–1	3–1	1–0	4–1		2–1	3–2	5–0	0–0						4–0		2–0	
New York City FC	2–1		3–1	4–4	3–0	1–2	3–1		0–2			1–1	2–3		1–1	1–2	0–0		0–1	5–0	2–3							1–1	1–1	
New York Red Bulls	3–0		1–1	4–2	3–2	0–2		0–2	4–4				2–0		0–3	1–0	0–1	1–1		3–2	1–3				4–1			0–3	0–2	
Orlando City SC	1–1		1–2	1–1	3–2	4–1			4–1	0–1			2–4		2–1	1–0	1–0	2–2	1–2		4–3		2–1		1–0				3–0	
Philadelphia Union	3–2		1–2	5–0	1–1	2–2			0–0				2–2		2–0	1–2	0–0	1–2	3–1	4–2			2–1	1–0		0–1			4–1	
Portland Timbers	0–1	1–2			3–2	3–2	0–0	2–2		3–1	1–1	2–1		5–4									2–1	2–1	3–1	1–3	6–0	2–2		1–4
Real Salt Lake		2–1					2–1	3–4		3–0	2–1	2–2	0–2	1–1		3–0		0–2				2–0		2–1	4–2	1–1	3–1	3–0		0–3
Seattle Sounders FC		1–2	2–2				2–0	2–1		0–1	0–2	2–1		3–1	1–1				0–0			1–5	2–0		1–1	3–2	2–1	4–1		0–2
San Diego FC		5–0		3–3			3–0	1–0		3–3	3–1	2–2		1–2	5–0						0–5	1–2	2–2	2–2		2–3	0–1	2–0		2–4
San Jose Earthquakes	2–0	5–1					2–2	2–3		1–0	1–1	2–2		1–5			1–1			0–4		3–1	2–1	0–1	3–0		3–0	1–3		1–1
Sporting Kansas City		1–2			2–2		1–4	1–1		0–2	3–1	3–1		2–1					1–2		3–4	3–3	1–3	1–1	0–1	1–3		1–1		0–3
St. Louis City SC		3–0				1–1	1–0	3–3		2–1	6–2	2–1		4–2		3–1						2–3	1–1	0–1	0–1	2–3	3–2		3–1	0–0
Toronto FC	1–2	3–3	4–4	1–1	2–1	3–3	3–2		2–1				2–4		2–1	2–1	2–1	1–1	1–1	3–3	3–3					1–1				
Vancouver Whitecaps FC		1–2					3–1	5–0	3–3	0–1	3–0	1–1		6–0				2–0				3–2	1–0	5–1	4–1	0–1	3–0	1–3	3–0	

Source: MLS
Legend: Blue = home team win; Yellow = draw; Red = away team win.

=== MLS All-Star Game ===
2026 MLS All-Star Game
July 29, 2026
8:00 p.m. EDT

MLS All-Stars (United States) (Canada)	4–3	(Mexico) Liga MX All-Stars
Son Heung-min 20', 23'; Zinckernagel 42'; Evander 58'	Report	Rey 9'; Rondón 55'; Paradela 90+1'

Bank of America Stadium, Charlotte, North Carolina
Attendance: 35,197
Referee: Rubiel Vazquez (United States)

== MLS Cup playoffs ==
=== Bracket ===
The higher seeded teams host single-elimination matches, with the MLS Cup host determined by overall points in the Supporters' Shield table. During the best-of-three round, the team with higher seed hosts the first match (and the third match, if required).

Wild card single match
E8	Orlando City SC	1
E9	FC Cincinnati	3
W8	Seattle Sounders FC	1 (2)
W9	Real Salt Lake (p)	1 (4)

Round one best-of-three series
E1	Nashville SC
E9	FC Cincinnati
E4	Chicago Fire FC
E5	Charlotte FC
E2	Inter Miami CF	0
E7	Columbus Crew	3
E3	New England Revolution	2
E6	Philadelphia Union	0
W1	Vancouver Whitecaps FC
W9	Real Salt Lake
W4	San Jose Earthquakes
W5	Houston Dynamo FC
W2	FC Dallas	3
W7	Portland Timbers	0
W3	St. Louis City SC
W6	Los Angeles FC

Conference semifinals single match
Eastern Conference
Western Conference

Conference finals single match

MLS Cup single match

== Attendance ==
=== Average home attendances ===
Rank	Team	GP	Cumulative	High	Low	Mean
1	Atlanta United FC	17	651,192	53,862	30,306	38,305
2	Seattle Sounders FC	17	542,904	40,171	28,587	31,936
3	Charlotte FC	17	472,175	35,611	23,903	27,775
4	Nashville SC	17	456,757	30,109	23,807	26,868
5	Inter Miami CF	17	448,150	26,854	25,123	26,362
6	Chicago Fire FC	17	438,911	63,094	15,845	25,818
7	Los Angeles FC	17	430,420	75,673	21,531	25,319
8	FC Cincinnati	17	428,972	25,513	23,717	25,234
9	Vancouver Whitecaps FC	17	428,842	40,086	20,947	25,226
10	New England Revolution	17	406,449	54,112	14,287	23,909
11	San Diego FC	17	392,281	28,459	18,650	23,075
12	New York City FC	17	384,883	45,845	17,197	22,640
13	Portland Timbers	17	381,576	24,686	19,351	22,446
14	St. Louis City SC	17	381,191	22,423	22,423	22,423
15	Austin FC	17	352,546	20,738	20,738	20,738
16	Real Salt Lake	17	351,281	21,512	19,783	20,664
17	Orlando City SC	17	341,522	24,453	15,656	20,090
18	Toronto FC	17	334,644	44,828	13,754	19,685
19	LA Galaxy	17	334,126	25,025	15,435	19,654
20	D.C. United	17	330,445	72,026	10,115	19,438
21	Columbus Crew	17	329,235	20,307	17,039	19,367
22	New York Red Bulls	17	328,389	26,287	13,309	19,317
23	Minnesota United FC	17	327,410	19,714	18,109	19,259
24	Colorado Rapids	17	326,413	75,824	14,568	19,201
25	San Jose Earthquakes	17	321,555	43,026	12,276	18,915
26	Houston Dynamo FC	17	318,227	21,063	14,742	18,719
27	Philadelphia Union	17	313,696	19,778	17,410	18,453
28	Sporting Kansas City	17	263,524	18,522	12,831	15,501
29	CF Montréal	17	249,471	19,619	12,022	14,675
30	FC Dallas (Note: Construction at Toyota Stadium temporarily lowered attendance seating to about 11,000.)	17	186,436	11,004	10,925	10,967
Total		510	11,253,623	75,824	10,115	22,066

=== Highest attendances ===
Regular season

Rank	Home team	Score	Away team	Attendance	Date	Matchday	Stadium	Ref.
1	Colorado Rapids	2–3	Inter Miami CF	75,824	April 18, 2025	8	Empower Field at Mile High	
2	Los Angeles FC	3–0	Inter Miami CF	75,673	February 21, 2026	1	Los Angeles Memorial Coliseum	
3	D.C. United	1–2	Inter Miami CF	72,026	March 7, 2026	3	M&T Bank Stadium	
4	Chicago Fire FC	1–1	Inter Miami CF	63,094	September 9, 2026	25	Soldier Field	
5	New England Revolution	1–2	Inter Miami CF	54,112	November 1, 2026	34	Gillette Stadium	
6	Atlanta United FC	2–3	Real Salt Lake	53,862	March 7, 2026	3	Mercedes-Benz Stadium	
7	Atlanta United FC	1–3	Inter Miami CF	46,686	October 17, 2026	31	Mercedes-Benz Stadium	
8	New York City FC	2–3	Inter Miami CF	45,845	March 22, 2026	5	Yankee Stadium	
9	Toronto FC	2–4	Inter Miami CF	44,828	May 9, 2026	12	BMO Field	
10	San Jose Earthquakes	1–1	LA Galaxy	43,026	July 25, 2026	18	Stanford Stadium	

2026 MLS Cup playoffs

Rank	Home team	Score	Away team	Attendance	Date	Stadium	Ref.
1	Seattle Sounders FC	1–1 (2–4 pen.)	Real Salt Lake	29,628	November 19, 2026	Lumen Field	
2	New England Revolution	2–0	Philadelphia Union	18,084	November 21, 2026	Gillette Stadium	
3	Orlando City SC	1–3	FC Cincinnati	17,147	November 19, 2026	Inter.co Stadium	
4	FC Dallas	3–0	Portland Timbers	10,925	November 21, 2026	Toyota Stadium	

== Player statistics ==
=== Goals ===
Rank	Player	Club	Goals
1	(Argentina) Lionel Messi	Inter Miami CF	26
2	(Croatia) Petar Musa	FC Dallas	22
3	(England) Sam Surridge	Nashville SC	21
4	(United States) Brian White	Vancouver Whitecaps FC	20
5	(United States) Milan Iloski	Philadelphia Union	19
5	(Brazil) Rafael Navarro	Colorado Rapids/St. Louis City SC (Note: Ten goals for Colorado Rapids; nine goals for St. Louis City SC)	19
7	(Gabon) Denis Bouanga	Los Angeles FC	18
7	(Italy) Kelvin Yeboah	Minnesota United FC	18
9	(Togo) Kévin Denkey	FC Cincinnati	17
9	(United States) Preston Judd	San Jose Earthquakes	17
9	(Germany) Hany Mukhtar	Nashville SC	17
9	(Uruguay) Luis Suárez	Inter Miami CF	17

=== Hat-tricks ===
Player	For	Against	Score	Date
(Croatia) Petar Musa	FC Dallas	San Diego FC	3–3 (H)	March 14
(England) Sam Surridge	Nashville SC	Orlando City SC	5–0 (H)	March 21
(Gabon) Denis Bouanga	Los Angeles FC	Orlando City SC	6–0 (H)	April 4
(Israel) Tai Baribo	D.C. United	New York Red Bulls	4–4 (A)	April 22
(Argentina) Martín Ojeda	Orlando City SC	Inter Miami CF	4–3 (A)	May 2
(Brazil) Evander	FC Cincinnati	Chicago Fire FC	3–2 (A)	May 2
(Austria) Hannes Wolf	New York City FC	Columbus Crew	3–0 (H)	May 10
(United States) Julian Hall	New York Red Bulls	Columbus Crew	3–2 (H)	May 13
(Germany) Hany Mukhtar	Nashville SC	Los Angeles FC	3–2 (H)	May 17
(Ghana) Prince Owusu	CF Montréal	D.C. United	4–4 (A)	May 23
(United States) Milan Iloski	Philadelphia Union	Inter Miami CF	4–6 (A)	May 24
(Uruguay) Luis Suárez	Inter Miami CF	Philadelphia Union	6–4 (H)	May 24
(Nigeria) Alhassan Yusuf	New England Revolution	D.C. United	3–0 (A)	August 20
(Argentina) Lionel Messi^{4}	Inter Miami CF	CF Montréal	7–1 (H)	August 29
(United States) Josh Sargent	Toronto FC	Chicago Fire FC	4–4 (H)	September 5
(Netherlands) Vincent Janssen	Portland Timbers	Minnesota United FC	5–4 (H)	September 5
(Uruguay) Bruno Damiani	Philadelphia Union	FC Cincinnati	5–0 (H)	September 9
(United States) Milan Iloski	Philadelphia Union	Orlando City SC	4–2 (H)	September 26
(Denmark) Carlo Holse	St. Louis City SC	LA Galaxy	6–2 (H)	October 11
(Israel) Liel Abada	Charlotte FC	CF Montréal	4–0 (H)	October 28

Notes

(H) – Home team
(A) – Away team
^{4} Scored 4 goals

=== Assists ===
Rank	Player	Club	Assists
1	(Spain) Pep Biel	Charlotte FC	18
2	(Brazil) Evander	FC Cincinnati	17
2	(Argentina) Lionel Messi	Inter Miami CF	17
4	(Argentina) Rodrigo De Paul	Inter Miami CF	16
4	(Slovakia) Albert Rusnák	Seattle Sounders FC	16
6	(Argentina) Cristian Espinoza	Nashville SC	15
6	(Argentina) Joaquín Pereyra	Minnesota United FC	15
6	(Germany) Marco Reus	LA Galaxy	15
6	(South Korea) Son Heung-min	Los Angeles FC	15
10	(United States) Cavan Sullivan	Philadelphia Union	14

=== Clean sheets ===
Rank	Player	Club	Clean sheets
1	(United States) Brian Schwake	Nashville SC	16
2	(Japan) Yohei Takaoka	Vancouver Whitecaps FC	14
3	(England) Jonathan Bond	Houston Dynamo FC	13
4	(France) Hugo Lloris	Los Angeles FC	12
5	(Brazil) Daniel	San Jose Earthquakes/FC Dallas (Note: Five clean sheets with San Jose Earthquakes; four clean sheets with FC Dallas)	9
6	(Denmark) Nicolas Hansen	Colorado Rapids	8
6	(United States) Patrick Schulte	Columbus Crew	8
6	(United States) Andrew Thomas	Seattle Sounders FC	8
9	(Jamaica) Andre Blake	Philadelphia Union	7
9	(United States) Matt Freese	New York City FC	7
9	(Croatia) Kristijan Kahlina	Charlotte FC	7

== Awards ==
=== Team/Player of the Matchday ===
- **Bold** denotes the Player of the Matchday.

Team of the Matchday
Matchday	Goalkeeper	Defenders	Midfielders	Forwards	Bench	Coach
1	(Croatia) Kahlina (CLT)	(United States) Munie (SJ) (United States) Robinson (CIN) (Sweden) McVey (SD)	(Gabon) Bouanga (LAFC) (United States) Mehmeti (RBNY) (Canada) Eustáquio (LAFC) (Brazil) Guilherme (HOU)	(Croatia) Musa (DAL) (United States) **Hall** (RBNY) (England) Surridge (NSH)	(Canada) Crépeau (ORL) (United States) Bassett (POR) (United States) Berhalter (VAN) (Germany) Hartel (STL) (Costa Rica) Madrigal (NSH) (United States) Rothrock (SEA) (Denmark) Dreyer (SD) (United States) Farrington (DAL) (Israel) Baribo (DC)	(Canada) Marc Dos Santos (LAFC)
2	(Brazil) Rafael (RSL)	(Netherlands) Urhoghide (DAL) (Australia) Herrington (COL) (Jamaica) Gray (NYC)	(Venezuela) Segovia (MIA) (United States) Delgado (LAFC) (Germany) Müller (VAN) (Denmark) Dreyer (SD)	(Serbia) Joveljić (SKC) (Brazil) Klauss (LA) (Argentina) **Messi** (MIA)	(United States) Callender (MIN) (United States) Che (RBNY) (United States) Mehmeti (RBNY) (United States) Gozo (RSL) (United States) Ricketts (SJ) (Argentina) Silvetti (MIA) (Italy) Yeboah (MIN) (United States) Ramirez (ATX) (Denmark) Ingvartsen (SD)	(Argentina) Javier Mascherano (MIA)
3	(United States) Brady (CHI)	(United States) Kossa-Rienzi (SEA) (United States) Blackmon (VAN) (United States) Gozo (RSL)	(Spain) Biel (CLT) (United States) Parks (NYC) (Argentina) Moralez (NYC) (Venezuela) **Carmona** (MTL)	(England) Surridge (NSH) (United States) White (VAN) (Brazil) Navarro (COL)	(Chile) Gillier (MTL) (Canada) Laryea (TOR) (Australia) Yazbeck (NSH) (United States) Berhalter (VAN) (Russia) Miranchuk (ATL) (Venezuela) Martínez (LAFC) (Denmark) Dreyer (SD) (Germany) Werner (SJ) (United States) Yapi (COL)	(Denmark) Jesper Sørensen (VAN)
4	(United States) Thomas (SEA)	(Uruguay) Laborda (VAN) (Colombia) Ceballos (NE) (Argentina) Jacob (ATL)	(Paraguay) Almirón (ATL) (United States) Berhalter (VAN) (Canada) Choinière (LAFC) (Argentina) Langoni (NE)	(Croatia) **Musa** (DAL) (Argentina) Fernández (NYC) (United States) White (VAN)	(Argentina) Ríos Novo (MIA) (Ghana) Woledzi (NSH) (Finland) Peltola (DC) (Norway) Berg Johnsen (SKC) (Finland) Valakari (SD) (Brazil) Guilherme (HOU) (Poland) Bogusz (HOU) (Serbia) Joveljić (SKC) (Ivory Coast) Latte Lath (ATL)	(United States) Brian Schmetzer (SEA)
5	(Brazil) Daniel (SJ)	(Scotland) Porteous (LAFC) (Argentina) Luján (MIA) (United States) Zimmerman (TOR)	(Venezuela) Echenique (CIN) (United States) Aaronson (COL) (Spain) Biel (CLT) (Argentina) Espinoza (NSH)	(United States) Farrington (DAL) (England) **Surridge** (NSH) (Belgium) Cuypers (CHI)	(Canada) Pantemis (POR) (Cameroon) Nouhou (SEA) (United States) Edelman (STL) (United States) Leroux (SJ) (Brazil) Guilherme (HOU) (Ghana) Owusu (MTL) (Argentina) Messi (MIA) (Australia) Goodwin (CTL) (Brazil) Navarro (COL)	(United States) B. J. Callaghan (NSH)
6	(United States) Brady (CHI)	(United States) Markanich (MIN) (Mali) Fofana (NE) (Netherlands) Urhoghide (DAL)	(Argentina) Langoni (NE) (United States) Tsakiris (SJ) (United States) Berhalter (VAN) (United States) Gozo (RSL)	(Gabon) **Bouanga** (LAFC) (Palestine) Abou Ali (CLB) (South Korea) Son (LAFC)	(France) Lloris (LAFC) (Colombia) Mosquera (POR) (Germany) Caliskan (RSL) (United States) Arfsten (CLB) (United States) Rothrock (SEA) (Ivory Coast) Zaha (CLT) (Argentina) Messi (MIA) (United States) Sargent (TOR) (United States) Judd (SJ)	(Canada) Marc Dos Santos (LAFC)
7	(United States) Callender (MIN)	(Germany) Baumgartl (STL) (Japan) Yoshida (LA) (Canada) Thompson (COL)	(Nigeria) Yusuf (NE) (United States) Mehmeti (RBNY) (Australia) Yazbek (NSH) (United States) Skahan (SJ)	(United States) Hall (RBNY) (Brazil) **Navarro** (COL) (United States) White (VAN)	(United States) Freese (NYC) (South Africa) Mbokazi (CHI) (Denmark) Sery (PHI) (United States) Duncan (MIN) (Venezuela) Bueno (PHI) (United States) Atencio (COL) (United States) Tsakiris (SJ) (Uruguay) Rossi (COL) (Venezuela) Kelsy (POR)	(England) Matt Wells (COL)
8	(Croatia) Kahlina (CLT)	(Colombia) Díaz (MIN) (South Africa) Makhanya (PHI) (Ghana) Woledzi (NSH)	(Burkina Faso) Bouda (SJ) (United States) Luna (RSL) (United States) C. Roldan (SEA) (Argentina) **Messi** (MIA)	(Croatia) Musa (DAL) (Spain) Solans (RSL) (Ghana) Owusu (MTL)	(United States) Johnson (DC) (Mexico) Herrera (HOU) (Brazil) Evander (CIN) (Germany) Mukhtar (NSH) (Argentina) Chancalay (MIN) (Ghana) Paintsil (LA) (Germany) Werner (SJ) (United States) Sabbi (VAN) (Belgium) Cuypers (CHI)	(United States) Bruce Arena (SJ)
9	(United States) Turner (NE)	(United States) Markanich (MIN) (Mali) Fofana (NE) (France) Marie (SJ)	(Argentina) M. Ojeda (ORL) (Argentina) De Paul (MIA) (Ghana) Donkor (RBNY) (Mexico) Ruvalcaba (RBNY)	(Israel) **Baribo** (DC) (Argentina) Fernández (NYC) (United States) Judd (SJ)	(Canada) Gavran (TOR) (Australia) Herrington (COL) (United States) Habroune (CLB) (Ecuador) Cifuentes (TOR) (Brazil) Luis Otávio (ORL) (Nigeria) Aliyu (HOU) (Argentina) A. Ojeda (NYC) (Togo) Denkey (CIN) (Germany) Werner (SJ)	(Argentina) Guillermo Hoyos (MIA)
10	(United States) Turner (NE)	(Australia) Rowles (DC) (Australia) Bonetig (POR) (Honduras) Najar (NSH)	(Germany) **Werner** (SJ) (Germany) Reus (LA) (Denmark) Zinckernagel (CHI) (United States) Arfsten (CLB)	(Togo) Denkey (CIN) (United States) White (VAN) (England) Surridge (NSH)	(United States) Celentano (CIN) (United States) Zawadzki (CLB) (France) Muyumba (ATL) (United States) Tillman (LAFC) (Spain) Gil (NE) (Germany) Mukhtar (NSH) (United States) Morris (SEA) (Belgium) Cuypers (CHI) (Albania) Uzuni (ATX)	(United States) Bruce Arena (SJ)
11	(Canada) Pantemis (POR)	(United States) Markanich (MIN) (United States) Roberts (SJ) (Uruguay) Laborda (VAN)	(Brazil) Evander (CIN) (United States) Luna (RSL) (Spain) Gil (NE) (Georgia (country)) Lobzhanidze (ATL)	(Italy) Yeboah (MIN) (Romania) Munteanu (DC) (Argentina) **M. Ojeda** (ORL)	(United States) Celentano (CIN) (United States) Hollingshead (LAFC) (Germany) Ennali (HOU) (United States) Gozo (RSL) (Russia) Miranchuk (ATL) (Argentina) Messi (MIA) (Trinidad and Tobago) Spicer (ORL) (United States) Ramirez (ATX) (Denmark) Ingvartsen (SD)	(Argentina) Martín Perelman (ORL)
12	(Brazil) Daniel (SJ)	(Mali) Fofana (NE) (United States) Nealis (RBNY) (Honduras) Najar (NSH)	(Austria) **Wolf** (NYC) (United States) McGlynn (HOU) (Argentina) De Paul (MIA) (Costa Rica) Madrigal (NSH)	(Brazil) Gabriel Pec (LA) (Venezuela) Kelsy (POR) (Argentina) Messi (MIA)	(United States) Ferree (SD) (Brazil) Kaick (DAL) (United States) Berhalter (VAN) (Spain) Gil (NE) (Spain) Biel (CLT) (Colombia) Rodríguez (MIN) (Argentina) Fernández (NYC) (Norway) Velde (POR) (Colombia) Aristizábal (TOR)	(Serbia) Marko Mitrović (NE)
13	(United States) Brady (CHI)	(Cameroon) Nouhou (SEA) (Australia) Herrington (COL) (Norway) Totland (STL)	(United States) Vazquez (SD) (Honduras) Acosta (NSH) (United States) Berhalter (VAN) (England) Harris (SKC)	(United States) Gozo (RSL) (United States) **Hall** (RBNY) (Argentina) Messi (MIA)	(United States) Freese (NYC) (Colombia) Palacios (NSH) (Italy) Bright (MIA) (England) Longstaff (MTL) (United States) Soma (SD) (United States) C. Sullivan (PHI) (United States) Cowell (RBNY) (Argentina) Espinoza (NSH) (Argentina) M. Ojeda (ORL)	(United States) B. J. Callaghan (NSH)
14	(United States) Brady (CHI)	(Uruguay) Sanabria (RSL) (Ghana) Agyemang (CLT) (South Africa) Mbokazi (CHI)	(Brazil) Gabriel Pec (LA) (Brazil) Guilherme (HOU) (Spain) Gil (NE) (Argentina) Messi (MIA)	(United States) Barlow (CIN) (Denmark) Ingvartsen (SD) (Germany) **Mukhtar** (NSH)	(United States) Schwake (NSH) (Austria) Schnegg (CLT) (Trinidad and Tobago) Fortune (ATL) (Brazil) Evander (CIN) (Denmark) Zinckernagel (CHI) (Brazil) Peglow (DC) (Canada) Afrifa (SKC) (United States) Sarver (DAL) (Spain) Solans (RSL)	(United States) Greg Vanney (LA)
15	(Brazil) Daniel (SJ)	(United States) Gutman (CHI) (Senegal) Fall (STL) (Ghana) Woledzi (NSH)	(Algeria) Farsi (CLB) (Mexico) Ruvalcaba (RBNY) (Brazil) **Evander** (CIN) (United States) Tillman (LAFC)	(Ghana) Owusu (MTL) (United States) White (VAN) (Uruguay) Suárez (MIA)	(United States) Turner (NE) (Czech Republic) Bucha (CIN) (United States) Skahan (SJ) (Germany) Müller (VAN) (France) Mboma Dem (CIN) (United States) Iloski (PHI) (Uruguay) Rossi (CLB) (United States) Judd (SJ) (Mexico) Berterame (MIA)	(Denmark) Jesper Sørensen (VAN)
16 & 17	(Canada) Crépeau (ORL)	(Germany) Wagner (PHI) (Spain) Williams (COL) (Slovenia) Brekalo (ORL)	(France) Griezmann (ORL) (Germany) Hartel (STL) (Colombia) Atuesta (ORL) (Czech Republic) Bucha (CIN)	(Uruguay) **Suárez** (MIA) (Venezuela) Kelsy (POR) (South Korea) Son (LAFC)	(United States) Schwake (NSH) (Argentina) Báez (ATL) (United States) Delgado (LAFC) (Brazil) Evander (CIN) (Scotland) Gauld (VAN) (Argentina) Fernández (NYC) (Gabon) Bouanga (LAFC) (Albania) Uzuni (ATX) (Serbia) Joveljić (SKC)	(Canada) Marc Dos Santos (LAFC)
18	(United States) Marcinkowski (LA)	(Norway) Totland (STL) (United States) Roberts (SJ) (United States) Westfield (PHI)	(United States) Alvarado Jr. (SD) (Poland) Bogusz (HOU) (Spain) Gil (NE) (Argentina) A. Ojeda (NYC)	(Gabon) **Bouanga** (LAFC) (Chile) Mora (POR) (United States) Ellis (ORL)	(Croatia) Kahlina (CLT) (Scotland) Porteous (LAFC) (United States) Raines (NE) (Brazil) Guilherme (HOU) (Czech Republic) Ostrák (STL) (Norway) Velde (POR) (Senegal) Thiaré (CLB) (Israel) Baribo (DC) (Uruguay) Suárez (MIA)	(Argentina) Martín Perelman (ORL)
19	(Canada) Sirois (DAL)	(Germany) Wagner (PHI) (United States) Pierre (PHI) (United States) Bye (POR)	(Brazil) Guilherme (HOU) (Brazil) Evander (CIN) (Spain) Gil (NE) (Denmark) Zinckernagel (CHI)	(Panama) Jiménez (RBNY) (Poland) **Lewandowski** (CHI) (Uruguay) Suárez (MIA)	(Cape Verde) Dos Santos (SD) (Colombia) Vera (MTL) (Spain) Méndez (CLB) (Germany) Müller (VAN) (United States) Cowell (RBNY) (Germany) Werner (SJ) (Brazil) Navarro (COL) (Israel) Baribo (DC) (United States) Iloski (PHI)	(Republic of Ireland) Jack Cassidy (POR)
20	(United States) Johnson (DC)	(United States) Gutman (CHI) (Ghana) Abubakar (DAL) (United States) Cannon (COL)	(Tunisia) Saad (NSH) (Ivory Coast) D'Avilla (CHI) (Germany) Dorsch (TOR) (United States) C. Sullivan (PHI)	(United States) Becher (STL) (Uruguay) Damiani (PHI) (Germany) **Mukhtar** (NSH)	(Cape Verde) Dos Santos (SD) (United States) Polvara (STL) (Honduras) Najar (NSH) (France) Muyumba (ATL) (Argentina) Pereyra (MIN) (Israel) Abada (CLT) (Brazil) Guilherme (HOU) (Germany) Müller (VAN) (Croatia) Musa (DAL)	(United States) B.J. Callaghan (NSH)
21	(United States) Celentano (CIN)	(Argentina) Negri (HOU) (United States) Pierre (PHI) (Ghana) Woledzi (NSH)	(Nigeria) **Yusuf** (NE) (Brazil) Evander (CIN) (France) Muyumba (ATL) (Uruguay) Valiente (DAL)	(Norway) Velde (POR) (Croatia) Musa (DAL) (England) Harrison (NE)	(United States) Las (ATX) (Argentina) Jacob (ATL) (Brazil) Ramiro (DAL) (Germany) Dorsch (TOR) (United States) Luna (RSL) (England) Harris (SKC) (Switzerland) Streit (MTL) (Ghana) Paintsil (LA) (Poland) Lewandowski (CHI)	(United States) Ben Olsen (HOU)
22	(Canada) Pantemis (POR)	(Colombia) Ocampo (VAN) (United States) Polvara (STL) (Honduras) Najar (NSH)	(Spain) Biel (CTL) (Germany) Mukhtar (NSH) (Argentina) Pereyra (MIN) (Paraguay) Almirón (ATL)	(Italy) Yeboah (MIN) (United States) White (VAN) (France) **Griezmann** (ORL)	(United States) Thomas (SEA) (Japan) Yoshida (LA) (United States) Sands (NYC) (United States) Duncan (MIN) (Brazil) Pirani (SD) (United States) C. Sullivan (PHI) (United States) Miller (NE) (Gabon) Bouanga (LAFC) (United States) Sargent (TOR)	(France) Yoann Damet (STL)
23	(United States) Schwake (NSH)	(Brazil) Casemiro (MIA) (United States) Pierre (PHI) (United States) Cannon (COL)	(France) Saint-Maximin (CLT) (Spain) Gil (NE) (Germany) Mukhtar (NSH) (United States) C. Sullivan (PHI)	(France) Griezmann (ORL) (Serbia) Joveljić (SEA) (Argentina) **Messi** (MIA)	(France) Lloris (LAFC) (Ukraine) Svatok (ATX) (Mali) Fofana (NE) (Germany) Müller (VAN) (Argentina) Fernández (NYC) (Denmark) Dreyer (SD) (Poland) Lewandowski (CHI) (England) Surridge (NSH) (Italy) Yeboah (MIN)	(United States) B.J. Callaghan (NSH)
24	(Jamaica) Blake (PHI)	(Brazil) Biro (ATX) (United States) Yedlin (RSL) (Norway) Totland (STL)	(Gabon) Bouanga (LAFC) (Haiti) Jean Jacques (PHI) (Germany) Reus (LA) (Switzerland) Haile-Selassie (CHI)	(Netherlands) **Janssen** (POR) (United States) Sargent (TOR) (Croatia) Musa (DAL)	(United States) Horvath (RBNY) (Ghana) Woledzi (NSH) (Brazil) Halter (HOU) (Norway) Wallem (STL) (United States) Leroux (SJ) (Canada) Caldeira (MIN) (France) Griezmann (ORL) (Switzerland) Embolo (ATL) (Chile) Tapia (CLB)	(France) Yoann Damet (STL)
25	(United States) Brady (CHI)	(United States) Gutman (CHI) (Brazil) Casemiro (MIA) (Israel) Feingold (NE)	(France) Griezmann (ORL) (United States) Tsakiris (SJ) (United States) C. Sullivan (PHI) (Norway) Velde (POR)	(Brazil) Navarro (STL) (Israel) Baribo (DC) (Uruguay) **Damiani** (PHI)	(Japan) Takaoka (VAN) (Brazil) Kaick (DAL) (United States) Terry (LAFC) (Scotland) Gauld (VAN) (United States) Q. Sullivan (PHI) (Hungary) Sallói (TOR) (France) Saint-Maximin (CLT) (Poland) Bogusz (HOU) (Brazil) Guilherme (HOU)	(United States) Ryan Richter (PHI)
26	(United States) Freese (NYC)	(Colombia) Angulo (ORL) (United States) Munie (SJ) (United States) Westfield (PHI)	(Brazil) André Luiz (SKC) (Argentina) Fernández (NYC) (Ghana) Donkor (RBNY) (United States) **C. Sullivan** (PHI)	(England) Surridge (NSH) (United States) Ramirez (ATX) (Brazil) Navarro (STL)	(Scotland) Gunn (SJ) (Germany) Reus (LA) (Spain) Biel (CTL) (Denmark) Holse (STL) (Argentina) A. Ojeda (NYC) (Argentina) Messi (MIA) (United States) Vassilev (PHI) (Togo) Denkey (CIN) (Israel) Turgeman (NE)	(Serbia) Marko Mitrović (NE)
27	(Cape Verde) Dos Santos (SD)	(Norway) Totland (STL) (United States) Roberts (SJ) (Algeria) Farsi (CLB)	(United States) **Miller** (NE) (Germany) Reus (LA) (Spain) Gil (NE) (England) Whittaker (COL)	(Denmark) Dreyer (SD) (Guinea) Diaby (VAN) (Argentina) Espinoza (NSH)	(United States) Stuver (ATX) (England) Westwood (CLT) (Romania) Mățan (STL) (United States) C. Sullivan (PHI) (Slovakia) Rusnák (SEA) (Russia) Miranchuk (ATL) (Brazil) André Luiz (SKC) (South Korea) Son (LAFC) (Togo) Denkey (CIN)	(United States) B. J. Callaghan (NSH)
28	(United States) Cleveland (SKC)	(Netherlands) Urhoghide (DAL) (England) Elliott (CHI) (United States) Haak (LA)	(United States) Vassilev (PHI) (Germany) Mukhtar (NSH) (Germany) Müller (VAN) (Japan) Nono (DC)	(United States) **Iloski** (PHI) (Ghana) Owusu (MTL) (United States) Judd (SJ)	(Canada) Gavran (TOR) (United States) Zawadzki (CLB) (Slovakia) Rusnák (SEA) (Germany) Löwen (SJ) (Brazil) André Luiz (SKC) (Mexico) Ríos (MTL) (Spain) Solans (RSL) (United States) Ramirez (ATX) (Senegal) Thiaré (CLB)	(France) Laurent Courtois (CLB)
29	(Canada) Crépeau (ORL)	(United States) Baker-Whiting (NSH) (United States) Romney (SJ) (Colombia) Angulo (ORL)	(Brazil) André Luiz (SKC) (Switzerland) Haile-Selassie (CHI) (Denmark) **Holse** (STL) (Argentina) Messi (MIA)	(Uruguay) Suárez (MIA) (Brazil) Navarro (STL) (Israel) Toklomati (CTL)	(United States) Edwards Jr. (SJ) (United States) Larraz (VAN) (United States) Durkin (STL) (United States) C. Sullivan (PHI) (Ghana) Mohammed (NSH) (United States) Arriola (SEA) (Mexico) Ruvalcaba (RBNY) (France) Griezmann (ORL) (Togo) Denkey (CIN)	(France) Yoann Damet (STL)
30	(Brazil) Daniel (DAL)	(Switzerland) Hefti (DC) (Canada) De Fougerolles (RSL) (Honduras) Najar (NSH)	(South Korea) Son (LAFC) (Germany) Reus (LA) (Germany) Mukhtar (NSH) (Brazil) Guilherme (HOU)	(Israel) Turgeman (NE) (Uruguay) **Damiani** (PHI) (Gabon) Bouanga (LAFC)	(Canada) St. Clair (MIA) (United States) Wynder (NE) (Argentina) De Paul (MIA) (Argentina) Galoppo (ATL) (Spain) Méndez (CLB) (United States) Miller (NE) (Canada) Corbeanu (TOR) (France) Griezmann (ORL) (Israel) Baribo (DC)	(United States) B.J. Callaghan (NSH)
31	(United States) Turner (NE)	(United States) Pierre (PHI) (Colombia) Yeimar (SEA) (United States) Miller (LA)	(Guinea) Guilavogui (RSL) (Mexico) Herrera (HOU) (Argentina) M. Ojeda (ORL) (Argentina) Messi (MIA)	(Israel) Toklomati (CLT) (Chile) Tapia (CLB) (France) **Griezmann** (ORL)	(United States) Schulte (CLB) (United States) Wynder (NE) (Germany) Caliskan (RSL) (Canada) Osorio (TOR) (Finland) Walta (LAFC) (United States) Jackson (MIN) (Guinea) Diaby (VAN) (Mexico) Berterame (MIA) (Uruguay) Suárez (MIA)	(France) Laurent Courtois (CLB)
32	(United States) Turner (NE)	(Netherlands) Urhoghide (DAL) (Denmark) Amundsen (CLB) (Poland) Marczuk (RSL)	(Ghana) Paintsil (LA) (France) **Chambost** (CLB) (Brazil) Evander (CIN) (Albania) Uzuni (ATX)	(Spain) Solans (RSL) (Croatia) Musa (DAL) (Democratic Republic of the Congo) Bakambu (SD)	(England) Bond (HOU) (United States) Mehmeti (RBNY) (Sweden) Salétros (CHI) (United States) Shore (NYC) (United States) Izoita (POR) (Spain) Gil (NE) (England) Whittaker (COL) (Costa Rica) Lassiter (POR) (Argentina) M. Ojeda (ORL)	(United States) B. J. Callaghan (NSH)
33	(United States) Schulte (CLB)	(United States) Markanich (MIN) (Brazil) Halter (HOU) (Uruguay) Laborda (VAN)	(France) Griezmann (ORL) (Scotland) Gauld (VAN) (Uruguay) Rodríguez (CLB) (Spain) Gil (NE)	(Norway) Velde (POR) (Israel) Turgeman (NE) (Israel) **Abada** (CLT)	(England) Bond (HOU) (Ghana) Woledzi (NSH) (Slovakia) Gidi (CIN) (United States) Jasinski (SJ) (Ivory Coast) Bamba (CHI) (Portugal) Da Costa (POR) (Guinea) Guilavogui (RSL) (United States) Sargent (TOR) (Israel) Toklomati (CLT)	(England) Dean Smith (CLT)
34	(Croatia) Kahlina (CLT)	(United States) Kessler (CLT) (United States) Zawadzki (CLB) (United States) Kikanović (SJ)	(Scotland) Gauld (VAN) (Argentina) Pereyra (MIN) (Germany) Reus (LA) (Argentina) Messi (MIA)	(Poland) Lewandowski (CHI) (United States) **White** (VAN) (Netherlands) Janssen (POR)	(Mexico) Sisniega (SD) (Uruguay) Laborda (VAN) (United States) Miller (LA) (Curaçao) Valerius (MIN) (France) Chambost (CLB) (Paraguay) Almirón (ATL) (Portugal) Da Costa (POR) (Argentina) Espinoza (NSH) (Ivory Coast) Bamba (CHI)	(United States) B. J. Callaghan (NSH)
35	(United States) Thomas (SEA)	(Moldova) Gherasimencov (VAN) (Canada) MacNaughton (STL) (United States) Booth (RSL)	(Slovakia) Rusnák (SEA) (Brazil) Kaick (DAL) (Paraguay) B. Ojeda (ORL) (United States) **C. Sullivan** (PHI)	(England) Surridge (NSH) (Chile) Tapia (CLB) (Israel) Abada (CLT)	(United States) Schwake (NSH) (Canada) Marshall-Rutty (RBNY) (Australia) Yazbek (NSH) (United States) Mehmeti (RBNY) (Greece) Triantis (MIN) (Norway) Velde (POR) (Senegal) Sabaly (VAN) (United States) Q. Sullivan (PHI) (Poland) Lewandowski (CHI)	(United States) Pablo Mastroeni (RSL)

=== Goal of the Matchday ===
Goal of the Matchday
Matchday	Player	Club	Ref.
1	(Uruguay) Diego Rossi	Columbus Crew	
2	(Argentina) Lionel Messi	Inter Miami CF	
3	(Greece) Nectarios Triantis	Minnesota United FC	
4	(Netherlands) Stijn Spierings	Real Salt Lake	
5	(Germany) Marcel Hartel	St. Louis City SC	
6	(United States) Zavier Gozo	Real Salt Lake	
7	(United States) Jude Terry	Los Angeles FC	
8	(Argentina) Lionel Messi	Inter Miami CF	
9	(Canada) Luka Gavran	Toronto FC	
10	(Iraq) Ahmed Qasem	Nashville SC	
11	(Argentina) Lionel Messi	Inter Miami CF	
12	(Brazil) Evander	FC Cincinnati	
13	(United States) Sebastian Berhalter	Vancouver Whitecaps FC	
14	(Canada) Stephen Afrifa	Sporting Kansas City	
15	(Uruguay) Luis Suárez	Inter Miami CF	
16 & 17	(South Korea) Son Heung-min	Los Angeles FC	
18	(Czech Republic) Tomáš Ostrák	St. Louis City SC	
19	(Brazil) Evander	FC Cincinnati	
20	(France) Tristan Muyumba	Atlanta United FC	
21	(Brazil) Guilherme Biro	Austin FC	
22	(Argentina) Joaquín Pereyra	Minnesota United FC	
23	(Argentina) Lionel Messi	Inter Miami CF	
24	(Chile) Gonzalo Tapia	Columbus Crew	
25	(Poland) Robert Lewandowski	Chicago Fire FC	
26	(Argentina) Lionel Messi	Inter Miami CF	
27	(South Korea) Son Heung-min	Los Angeles FC	
28	(Argentina) Lionel Messi	Inter Miami CF	
29	(Argentina) Lionel Messi	Inter Miami CF	
30	(Germany) Hany Mukhtar	Nashville SC	
31	(Argentina) Martín Ojeda	Orlando City SC	
32	(Brazil) Evander	FC Cincinnati	
33	(France) Antoine Griezmann	Orlando City SC	
34	(Ecuador) Sergio Vásquez	Los Angeles FC	

=== Player of the Month ===
Month	Player	Club	Stats	Ref.
February/March	(England) Sam Surridge	Nashville SC	4 matches played, 7 goals, 0 assists	
April	(Germany) Timo Werner	San Jose Earthquakes	3 matches played, 4 goals, 3 assists	
May	(Brazil) Evander	FC Cincinnati	5 matches played, 7 goals, 5 assists	
July/August	(Brazil) Evander	FC Cincinnati	7 matches played, 4 goals, 5 assists	
September	(United States) Cavan Sullivan	Philadelphia Union	4 matches played, 4 goals, 5 assists	
October/November	(France) Antoine Griezmann	Orlando City SC	7 matches played, 6 goals, 4 assists	

=== End-of-season awards ===
Award	Winner (club)	Ref.
Most Valuable Player		
Defender of the Year	Maxwell Woledzi (Nashville SC)	
Goalkeeper of the Year		
Coach of the Year		
Young Player of the Year		
Newcomer of the Year	Antoine Griezmann (Orlando City SC)	
Comeback Player of the Year		
Golden Boot	Lionel Messi (Inter Miami CF)	
Audi Goals Drive Progress Impact Award		
Referee of the Year	Jon Freemon	
Assistant Referee of the Year	Felisha Mariscal	
Goal of the Year	Martín Ojeda (Orlando City SC)	
Save of the Year	Brian Schwake (Nashville SC)	
