= Matthew Wells =

Matthew or Matt Wells may refer to:

- Matthew Wells (field hockey) (born 1978), Australian Olympic field hockey defender
- Matthew Wells (linebacker) (born 1990), American football player
- Matthew Wells (rower) (born 1979), British Olympic rower
- Matt Wells (television presenter), Canadian television presenter and musician
- Matt Wells (boxer) (1886–1953), British boxer
- Matt Wells (American football coach) (born 1973), Texas Tech head football coach
- Matt Wells (football manager) (born 1988), head coach of Colorado Rapids
