= Brian Schwake =

American soccer player (born 2001)

- Schwake with Nashville SC in 2026

Personal information
- Full name: Brian Oliver Schwake
- Date of birth: August 24, 2001 (age 25)
- Place of birth: West Hartford, Connecticut, U.S.
- Height: 6 ft 2 in (1.88 m)
- Position: Goalkeeper

Team information
- Current team: Nashville SC
- Number: 99

Youth career
- 2017–2019: Sockers FC

College career
Years	Team	Apps	(Gls)
2019–2020	DePaul Blue Demons	0	(0)

Senior career*
Years	Team	Apps	(Gls)
2020–2023	Livingston	0	(0)
2020–2021	→ Linlithgow Rose (loan)	23	(0)
2021–2022	→ Edinburgh City (loan)	34	(0)
2022–2023	→ Greenock Morton (loan)	36	(0)
2023–2025	Castellón	1	(0)
2025–	Nashville SC	27	(0)
2025	→ Huntsville City FC (loan)	6	(0)

International career^{‡}
2026–	United States	2	(0)
- * Club domestic league appearances and goals as of 05:11, October 11, 2026 (UTC) ‡ National team caps and goals as of October 6, 2026

Brian Oliver Schwake (/ˈbraɪən ˈʃwɑːkiː/ BRY-ən SHWAH-kee; born August 24, 2001) is an American professional soccer player who plays as a goalkeeper for Major League Soccer club Nashville SC and the United States national team.

== Club career ==
=== Livingston FC ===
Schwake was signed by Livingston after a freshman college season at DePaul Blue Demons in his native United States. Schwake's first months in Scotland were complicated by the restrictions of the COVID-19 pandemic. He spent a loan spell with Linlithgow Rose in 2020, featuring in their run in the 2020–21 Scottish Cup, and another loan with Edinburgh City in the 2021–22 season.

==== Edinburgh City (loan) ====
Schwake had a successful 2021–22 season on loan with Edinburgh City. He appeared in 34 league games with 125 saves, second to Craig Gordon for number of saves in the SPFL. He was named to SPFL Team of the Week on August 17, 2021, and again on March 15, 2022. Schwake played a key role in Edinburgh City's promotion to League 1, being named Man of the Match by BBC Alba for his saves in the second leg of the promotion play-off final. Schwake was named to SPFL League 2 Team of the Season for 2021–22.

==== Greenock Morton (loan) ====
On June 16, 2022, Livingston announced that Schwake had been loaned to Greenock Morton for the 2022–23 season. He was named to SPFL Team of the Round on 21 July 2022 and SPFL Team of the Week on 22 November 2022. Schwake is "highly accurate in possession, completing 73% of long passes." He ended the season with the joint most clean sheets at 11 and second for most saves. On 29 May 2023, Livingston announced Brian Schwake had been offered terms for a new contract but he declined, ending his tenure with the team.

=== CD Castellón ===
On August 4, 2023, CD Castellón announced an agreement with Schwake until June 2024. Since moving to Spain, he has been used as a 'cup goalkeeper', appearing only in Copa del Rey matches. Schwake made his debut on October 31, in a 3–2 win after extra time over Cacereño in the first round and another appearance in the second round as Castellón overcame Segunda División side Real Oviedo 2–1 on December 5. In his third Copa del Rey match against La Liga club and the previous season's runners-up Osasuna on January 7, 2024, Schwake made ten saves and was named to Fútbol Total's Team of the Round (Osasuna eventually prevailed 1–0 after extra time). On March 1, 2024, CD Castellón announced they reached an agreement to renew the American goalkeeper until 2025.

=== Nashville SC ===
On January 23, 2025, Castellón announced the transfer of Schwake to Major League Soccer side Nashville SC. Schwake debuted for Nashville SC in the 2025 U.S. Open Cup on May 6, 2025, with a victory against Chattanooga Red Wolves. He became the first goalkeeper in club history to keep a clean sheet in his debut. Schwake appeared in all subsequent U.S. Open Cup games. Schwake backed up Joe Willis for every league game, appearing with Huntsville in preparation for the U.S. Open Cup games. On October 1, 2025, Schwake made his fifth consecutive U.S. Open Cup start for the Boys in Gold, and stopped seven shots to win the Cup and bring the first professional trophy to Tennessee. He was named Man of the Match for his performance in the game.

For the 2026 season, Schwake became the starting keeper and continued to make history with Nashville SC. He was unbeaten for his first 14 games across both seasons, breaking the MLS record set by Jorge Campos in 1996. As Nashville progressed in the 2026 CONCACAF Champions Cup, he was named Best XI for his performance in the Round of 16. Schwake was the first goalkeeper in Nashville SC history to make the MLS All-Star team by leading the league with 10 wins, the second most shutouts with six and the second lowest goals against average among starting goalkeepers at 0.79. On November 18, Schwake won the 2026 MLS Save of the Year Award for a save against a close-range shot from Ben Bender to preserve a goalless draw against the Philadelphia Union on October 28.

== Personal life ==
Born in the United States, Schwake is also a citizen of Luxembourg through descent.

== Career statistics ==
=== International ===
As of match played October 6, 2026

Appearances and goals by national team and year
National team	Year	Apps	Goals
United States	2026	2	0
Total		2	0

== Honors ==
Nashville SC

- Supporters' Shield: 2026

Individual

- MLS All-Star: 2026
- MLS Save of the Year: 2026
