= MLS Save of the Year Award =

Annual award in Major League Soccer

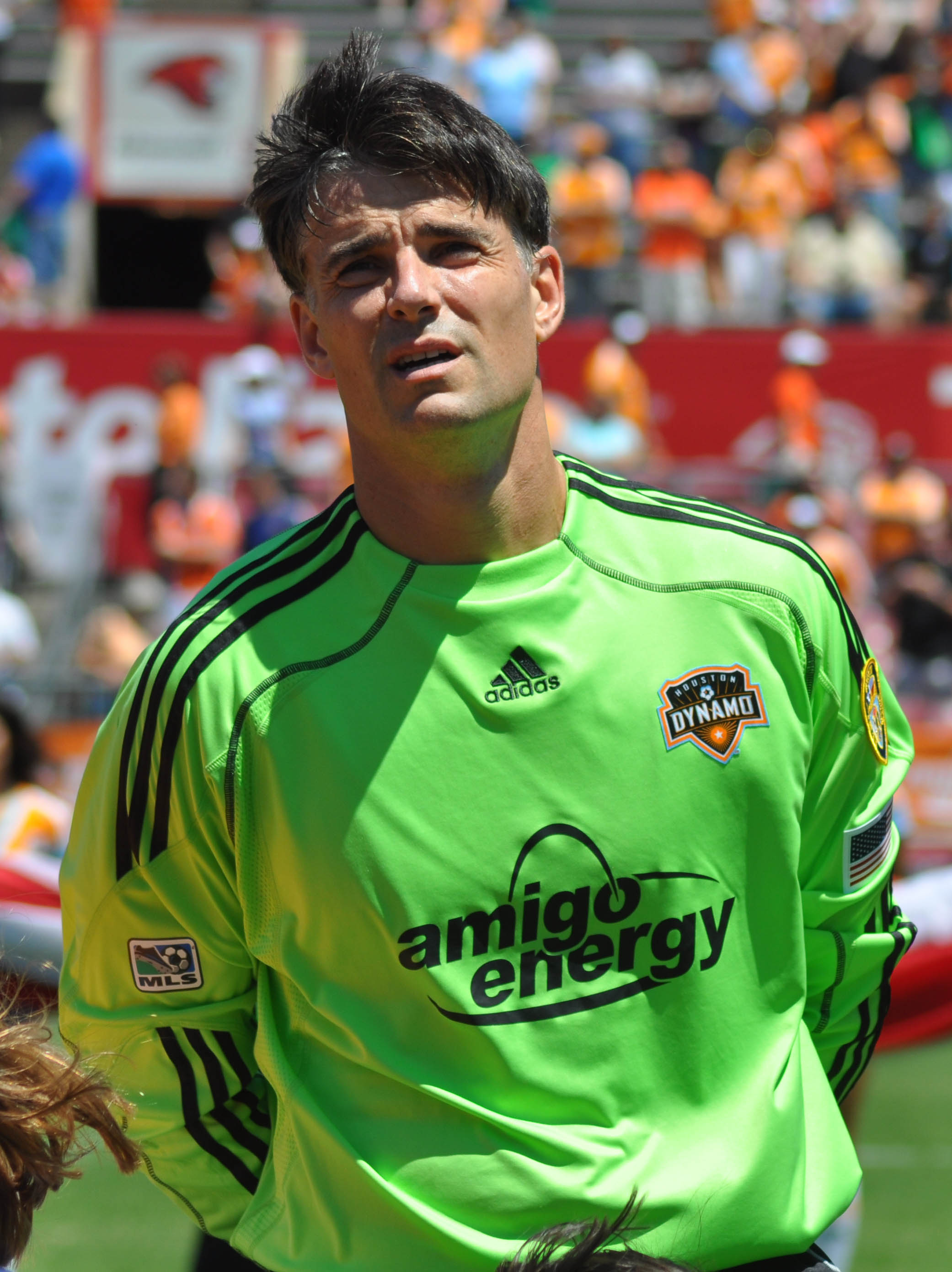
Pat Onstad won the inaugural award in 2009

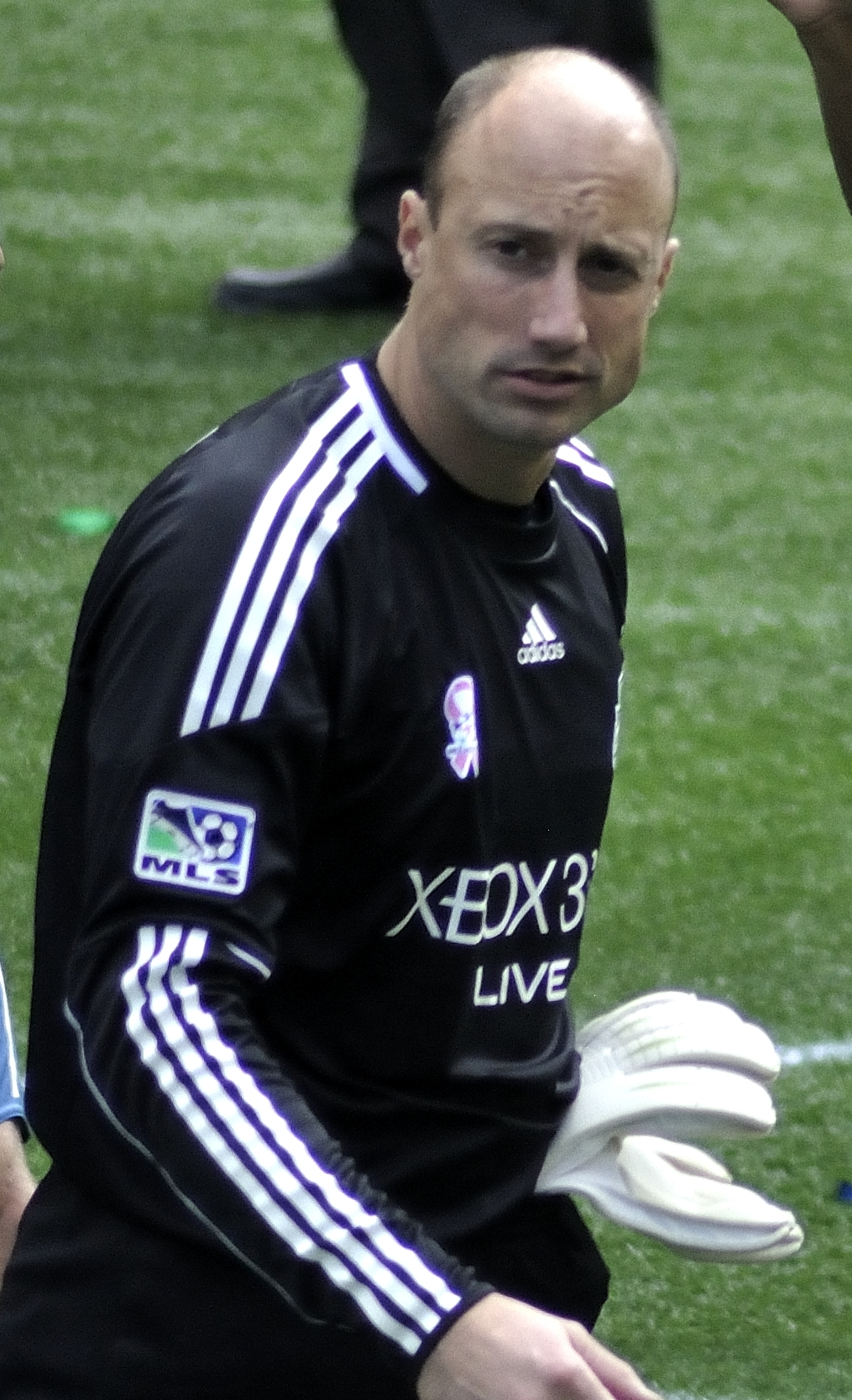
Kasey Keller was the first player to win the award more than once

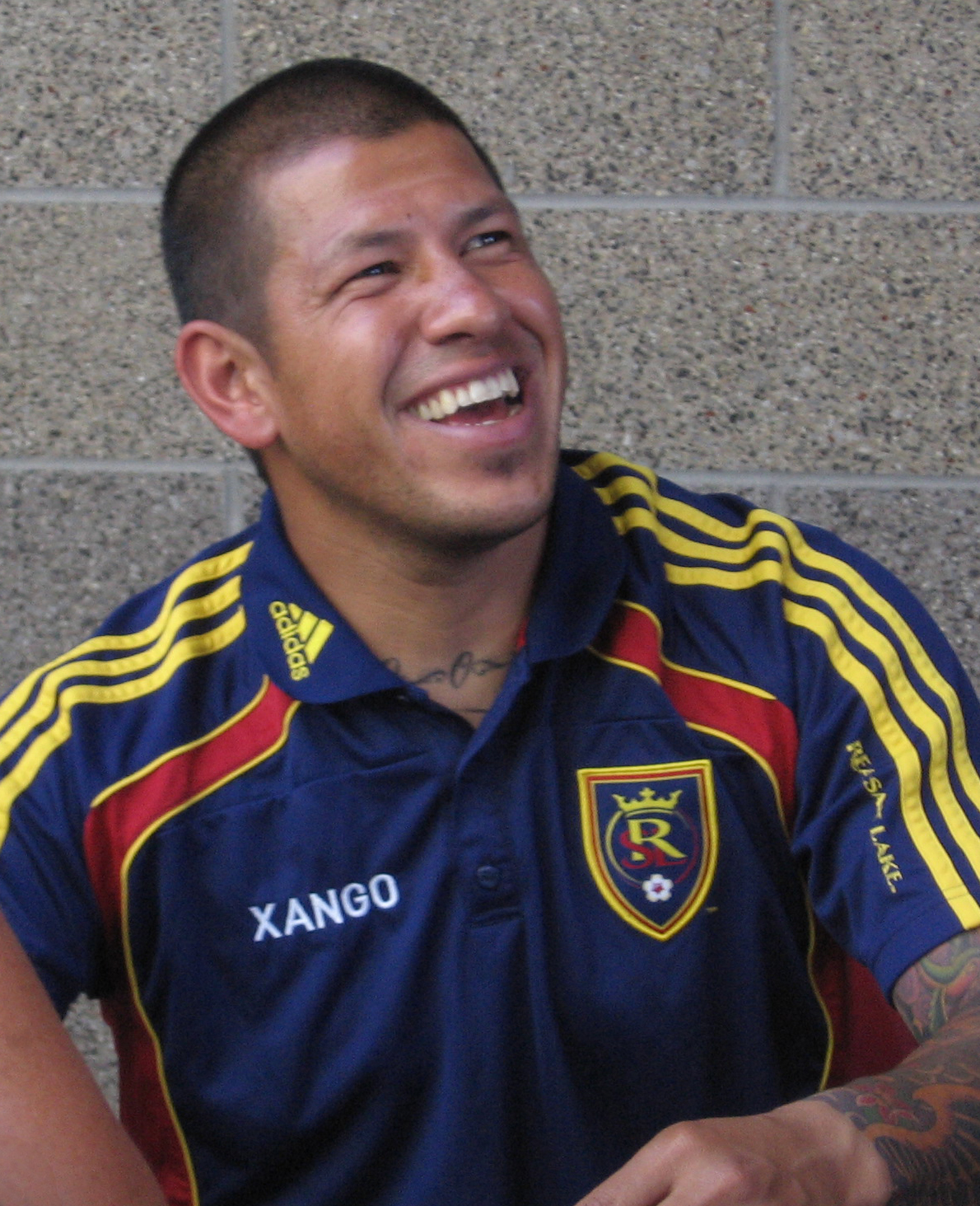
Nick Rimando has won the most MLS Save of the Year Awards, with three

The MLS Save of the Year Award is awarded by Major League Soccer to a player who is voted by fans as having the best save of the MLS season.

== Winners ==
Season	Player	Club	Opponent	Stadium	Date	Ref.
2009	(Canada) Pat Onstad	Houston Dynamo	Colorado Rapids	Robertson Stadium	April 19, 2009	
2010	(United States) Kasey Keller	Seattle Sounders FC	Sporting Kansas City	Qwest Field	April 17, 2010	
2011	(United States) Kasey Keller (2)	Seattle Sounders FC	San Jose Earthquakes	CenturyLink Field	October 15, 2011	
2012	(United States) Nick Rimando	Real Salt Lake	Sporting Kansas City	Livestrong Sporting Park	April 14, 2012	
2013	(United States) Nick Rimando (2)	Real Salt Lake	Colorado Rapids	Dick's Sporting Goods Park	August 3, 2013	
2014	(United States) Luis Robles	New York Red Bulls	Seattle Sounders FC	Red Bull Arena	September 20, 2014	
2015	(Ghana) Adam Larsen Kwarasey	Portland Timbers	Real Salt Lake	Rio Tinto Stadium	August 15, 2015	
2016	(United States) Joe Bendik	Orlando City SC	Sporting Kansas City	Children's Mercy Park	May 15, 2016	
2017	(United States) Brad Guzan	Atlanta United FC	New York Red Bulls	Red Bull Arena	October 15, 2017	
2018	(Switzerland) Stefan Frei	Seattle Sounders FC	Colorado Rapids	Dick's Sporting Goods Park	July 4, 2018	
2019	(United States) Nick Rimando (3)	Real Salt Lake	Colorado Rapids	Rio Tinto Stadium	August 24, 2019	
2020	(Curaçao) Eloy Room	Columbus Crew SC	Orlando City SC	Exploria Stadium	November 4, 2020	
2021	(Switzerland) Stefan Frei (2)	Seattle Sounders FC	Real Salt Lake	Rio Tinto Stadium	September 18, 2021	
2022	(Peru) Pedro Gallese	Orlando City SC	Atlanta United FC	Mercedes-Benz Stadium	July 17, 2022	
2023	(United States) Roman Celentano	FC Cincinnati	Columbus Crew	TQL Stadium	May 20, 2023	
2024	(Indonesia) Maarten Paes	FC Dallas	LA Galaxy	Dignity Health Sports Park	May 29, 2024	
2025	(United States) Roman Celentano (2)	FC Cincinnati	Nashville SC	Geodis Park	March 29, 2025	
2026	(United States) Brian Schwake	Nashville SC	Philadelphia Union	Geodis Park	October 28, 2026	
