= Said Bakkati =

Dutch footballer and coach (born 1982)

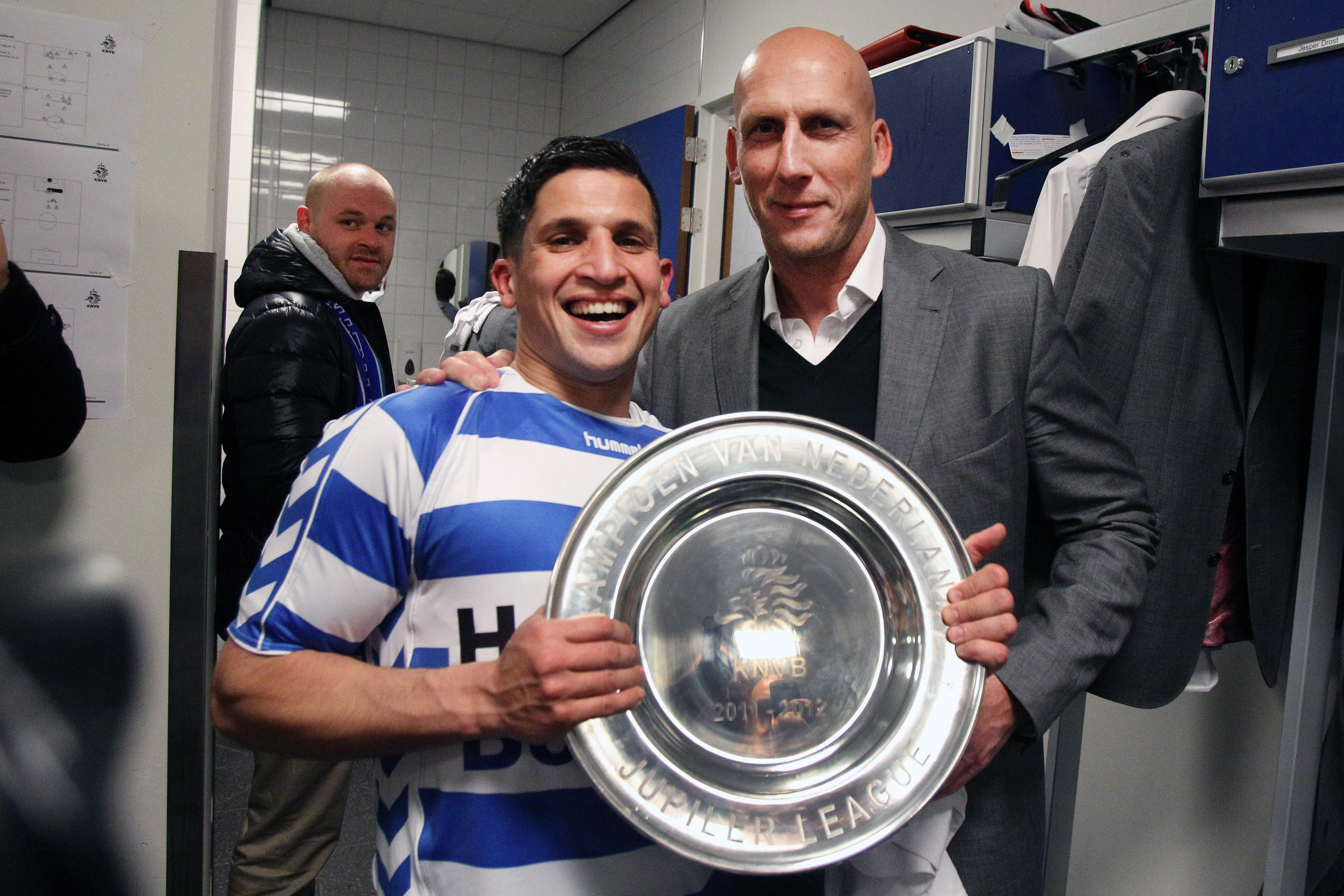
- Bakkati (left) with Jaap Stam (right) with the champion shield after FC Zwolle became champion of the Eerste Divisie.

Personal information
- Date of birth: 23 March 1982 (age 44)
- Place of birth: Groningen, Netherlands
- Height: 1.72 m (5 ft 8 in)
- Position: Right-back

Team information
- Current team: Feyenoord (assistant)

Youth career
- –1998: GVAV-Rapiditas
- 1998–2000: Heerenveen

Senior career*
Years	Team	Apps	(Gls)
2000–2006	Heerenveen	86	(0)
2006–2007	ADO Den Haag	32	(0)
2007–2009	Go Ahead Eagles	42	(0)
2009–2012	FC Zwolle	70	(0)
2012–2015	Emmen	73	(1)
Total		303	(1)

Managerial career
- 2015–2016: Jong Ajax (assistant)
- 2016–2018: Reading (assistant)
- 2018–2019: PEC Zwolle (assistant)
- 2019-2020: Feyenoord (assistant)
- 2020–2021: FC Cincinnati (assistant)
- 2022–2023: ADO Den Haag (assistant)
- 2023–2025: Ajax (assistant)
- 2025–2026: Sparta (assistant)
- 2025–: Netherlands U-21 (assistant)
- 2026-: Feyenoord (assistant)
- * Club domestic league appearances and goals

Said Bakkati (Arabic: سعيد بقّاتي; born 23 March 1982) is a Dutch former footballer who serves as assistant manager of Feyenoord. During his playing career, he played as a right-back. Born in the Netherlands, he is of Moroccan descent.

== Playing career ==
=== Club ===
Bakkati's career began when he signed a professional contract with Heerenveen, making his first first-team appearance in 2000, at the age of 18. After five-and-a-half years with the team from Friesland, he joined fellow Eredivisie participants ADO Den Haag during the 2005–06 season.

After playing for Go Ahead Eagles and PEC Zwolle, Bakkati ended his playing career with Emmen. He was then appointed trainer in the youth academy of Ajax.

== Managerial career ==
On 13 June 2016, Bakkati was appointed as an assistant manager to Jaap Stam at English Championship side Reading. Bakkati left the club on 23 March 2018.

On 29 December 2018, Bakkati joined Dutch club PEC Zwolle as assistant manager, where he once again is assisting Jaap Stam.

On 6 March 2019, it was announced that Bakkati would be joining Feyenoord as an assistant manager alongside Jaap Stam at the start of the new season.

On 21 May 2020, Bakkati joined Jaap Stam at MLS side FC Cincinnati. He was released from the club along with the other assistant coach, Yoann Damet, in September 2021. In summer 2025 he was appointed assistant manager at the Netherlands national under-21 football team alongside a similar role at Sparta.
