= B. J. Callaghan =

American soccer coach (born 1981)

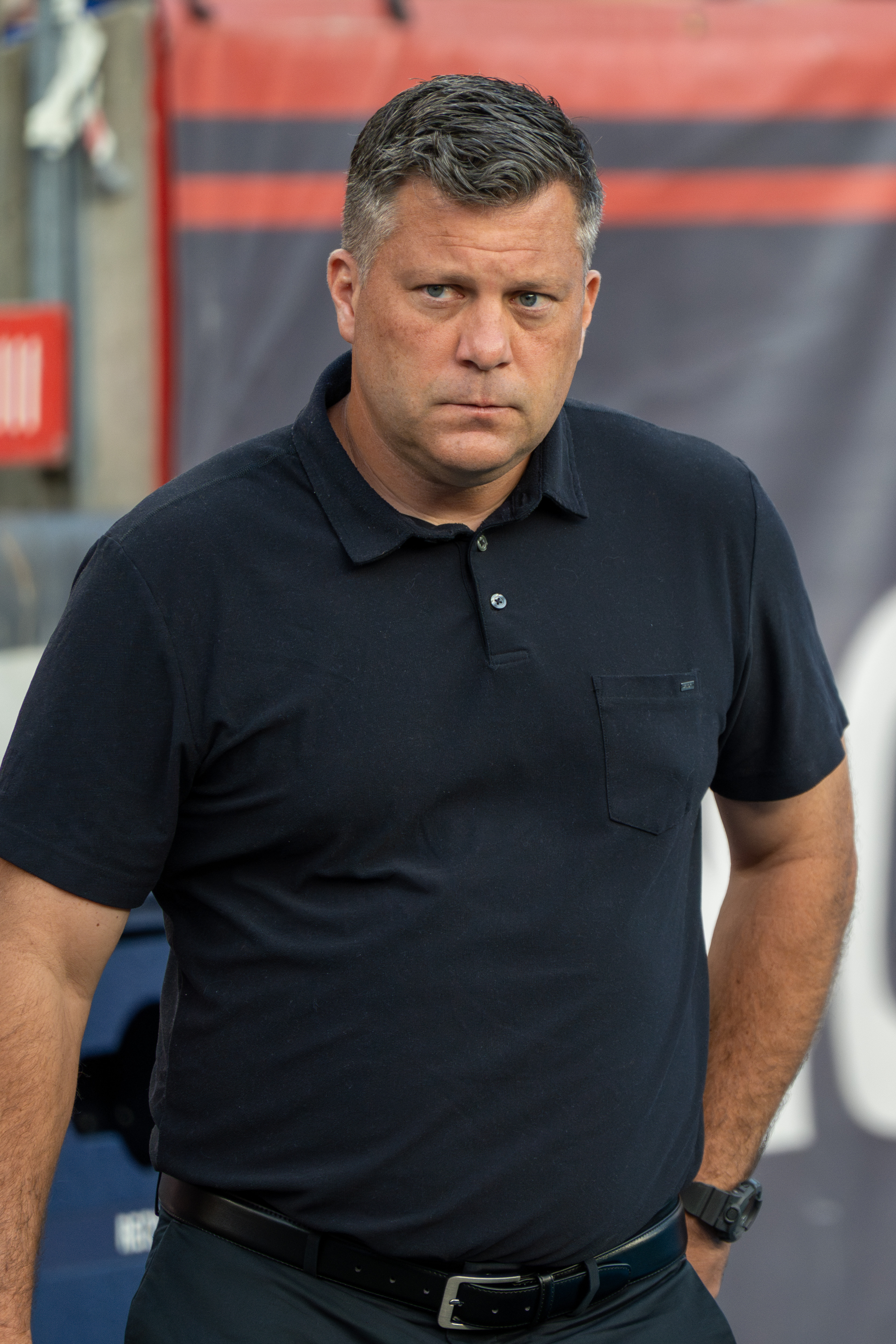
- Callaghan in 2025

Personal information
- Full name: Brian Joseph Callaghan II
- Date of birth: July 1, 1981 (age 45)
- Place of birth: Ventnor City, New Jersey, U.S.
- Position: Goalkeeper

Team information
- Current team: Nashville SC (head coach)

Youth career
- –1999: Holy Spirit Spartans

College career
Years	Team	Apps	(Gls)
1999–2002	Ursinus Bears		

Managerial career
- 2023: United States (interim)
- 2024–: Nashville SC

Brian Joseph Callaghan II (born July 1, 1981) is an American professional soccer coach and former college player who is the head coach of Major League Soccer club Nashville SC. He was previously the interim head coach of the United States national team.

== Playing career ==
Callaghan was a collegiate soccer player at Ursinus College. A goalkeeper, he made 250 career saves. By the end of his final season he had the fourth highest amount of saves in the history of the college's soccer program. He was the captain of the team in the 2002 season.

== Coaching career ==
After graduation, Callaghan was an assistant coach at his alma mater for one year and had been the coach of the FC Delco before joining the staff at Saint Joseph's University, where he was the assistant coach of the women's soccer program for two seasons. In 2006, he became the top assistant coach of the women's soccer program of Villanova University, where his grandfather, Jack Kraft, had been the men's basketball head coach for over a decade and led the Wildcats to the 1971 national championship game. Callaghan joined the staff of the university's men's soccer program as an assistant coach under Tom Carlin in 2008, and was later promoted to associate head coach of the Wildcats in 2010.

While at Villanova, Callaghan met Jim Curtin, a Wildcats standout from 1997 to 2000 who was a volunteer assistant. Following Curtin's eventual hiring by the Major League Soccer club Philadelphia Union as a member of the club's academy staff, Callaghan was also hired in 2012 as an academy coach while he was continuing to be an associate head coach at Villanova. Curtin alongside Callaghan guided the Union U-17's to the 2012 Generation Adidas Cup trophy. Callaghan went on to leave Villanova to work full-time for the Union in 2013 following Curtin's promotion as the first team assistant coach. Callaghan was later one of Curtin's initial hires after the latter's appointment to interim head coach and later to permanent head coach after the firing of John Hackworth.

Callaghan remained with the Union through 2018, before joining the United States men's national team as an assistant coach and strategy analyst under Gregg Berhalter in January 2019. After Berhalter's contract expired at the end of 2022, Callaghan stayed with the program following Anthony Hudson's promotion from assistant coach to interim head coach.

On May 30, 2023, the United States Soccer Federation announced that Callaghan would succeed Hudson as interim head coach of the men's national team. In June 2023, the United States Soccer Federation re-appointed Berhalter as head coach and announced that Callaghan's stint as interim head coach will conclude after the 2023 CONCACAF Gold Cup. He made his debut as head coach on June 15 against rivals Mexico in the semi-finals of the 2023 CONCACAF Nations League Finals. The United States won 3–0 and Callaghan became the first coach of the men's national soccer team to win on their debut against Mexico since David Gould in the final round of 1934 FIFA World Cup qualification. The team went on to defeat Canada in the tournament final three days later.

On July 3, 2024, Callaghan was hired by Major League Soccer club Nashville SC as their head coach. He is the club's second head coach in its history after Gary Smith, who was fired on May 16 and replaced by an interim coach. Callaghan officially joined Nashville SC on July 22, 2024, in preparation of the 2024 Leagues Cup. Since his appointment as head coach of Nashville SC, the team has won the 2025 U.S. Open Cup and the 2026 Supporters' Shield.

== Coaching statistics ==
As of match played 7 November 2026

Coaching record by team and tenure
Team	From	To	Record					Ref.
Team	From	To	G	W	D	L	Win %	Ref.
United States (interim)	May 30, 2023	July 12, 2023	7	4	3	0	57.14	
Nashville SC	July 22, 2024	present	98	52	19	27	53.06	
Total			105	56	22	27	53.33	

== Honors ==
=== United States ===
- CONCACAF Nations League: 2022–23

=== Nashville SC ===
- U.S. Open Cup: 2025
- Supporters' Shield: 2026

== Personal life ==
Raised in Ventnor City, New Jersey, Callaghan played prep soccer at Holy Spirit High School.

Callaghan graduated from Ursinus College in 2003 with a bachelor's degree in economics and business administration. He was reportedly working on a Master of Education degree at Saint Joseph's University in 2006.

He is married to Ursinus alumna Leigh Maggi Callaghan who also graduated in 2003.
