= Supporters' Shield =

Trophy for the MLS team with the best regular season record

- Sport: Soccer
- League: Major League Soccer
- Awarded for: Team with the best record in the regular season
- Presented by: The Supporters' Shield Foundation

History
- First award: 1999, 1996 (retroactively)
- First winner: Tampa Bay Mutiny (1996, retroactively)
- Most wins: D.C. United; LA Galaxy (4 shields each)
- Most recent: Nashville SC (1st shield)

The Supporters' Shield is an annual award given to the Major League Soccer (MLS) team with the best regular season record, as determined by the MLS points system. The Supporters' Shield has been annually awarded at the MLS Supporters' Summit since 1999 (with the winners between 1996 and 1998 awarded retroactively), and has been recognized as a major trophy by the league. It echoes the practice of the top European leagues in which the team with the best record is the champion. Since 2006, the Supporters' Shield winner has earned a berth in the CONCACAF Champions Cup. (Note: Canadian MLS teams could not earn a berth through the Supporters' Shield until 2023.)

D.C. United and the LA Galaxy, with four Supporters' Shields each, have won the most shields of any MLS team. Nashville SC are the 2026 holders of the Supporters' Shield, clinching their first shield with three regular season matches remaining. Nashville SC also currently holds the record for the most points in a regular season, with 77 in the 2026 campaign.

== History ==
=== Conception and fundraising ===
When Major League Soccer had its inaugural season in 1996, the league resembled its contemporary North American leagues. After the regular season, the campaign culminated with the MLS Cup playoffs, en route to the postseason championship match, the MLS Cup. The club with the best regular season record received nothing more than the top seed in the playoffs.

In 1997, soccer fan Nick Lawrus on a listserv proposed the notion of a "Supporters' Scudetto", as a result of the Tampa Bay Mutiny earning the best regular season record but failing to win the 1996 MLS Cup Final. A committee composed of members of all MLS teams' supporters changed the name to "Supporters' Shield" but, due to disagreements between members of the committee, the proposal failed to come to fruition.

The following year, another group led by soccer enthusiast Sam Pierron tried to revive the idea by giving an award to the regular season champions. Since MLS refused to fund the idea, Pierron began fundraising to purchase a trophy with the help of supporters from various MLS clubs. Fundraising was boosted with donations from ESPN commentator Phil Schoen and MLS commissioner Doug Logan. In the end, nearly $3,000 was donated to commission the trophy, which was a chevron made by University of Missouri-Kansas City art student Paula Richardson out of sterling silver sheet metal, for $2,200.

The process to create and purchase the Supporters' Shield was not completed until the last weeks of the 1999 season. Although D.C. United were the first MLS club to win the award, the first-place finishes between 1996 and 1998 have all been awarded the honor retroactively, with their names included on the shield at the time of its creation.

Throughout the early to mid-2000s, the Shield received little praise or recognition from MLS or the general public, as the league awarded the MLS Cup winner and runner-up with spots in continental tournaments.

=== First Shield incentives arrive ===
In February 2006, USSF decided that the Supporters' Shield winner and the MLS Cup winner would represent the United States in the CONCACAF Champions Cup. If the Supporters Shield winner also wins the MLS Cup, the U.S. Open Cup, or if either spot is won by a Canadian team, the U.S.-based team with the second-highest regular season point total qualifies as well. When the Champions Cup became the CONCACAF Champions League, the United States Soccer Federation gave both the Supporters' Shield winner and the MLS Cup winner direct Group stage spots.

On eight occasions (1997, 1999, 2000, 2002, 2008, 2011, 2017, and 2022) the winner of the Supporters' Shield also won the MLS Cup that same year, becoming the overall champion of the MLS season. In 2011, the league announced that the Shield winner's opponent in the MLS Cup quarterfinals would be the lowest-seeded team remaining.

=== Redesign ===
As the Shield began to become more prized and grow in significance along with "supporter culture" growing throughout the league, the idea of creating a new Supporters' Shield began at the MLS Supporters Summit during the 2010 MLS Cup in Toronto. The idea continued to gain traction at the then recently formed Independent Supporters Council (ISC) the following two years in Los Angeles and Portland, Oregon. The Supporter's Shield Foundation was created out of the ISC meeting in Portland in 2012 with a mission to fund the creation of a new shield and to promote and manage the trophy going forward. The cost of the new Shield was quoted at $18,000 with a majority of the funds raised through the "I Support the Shield" scarf drive that culminated in the sale of 2000 supporter scarves.

With the fundraising complete, in early 2013 the new Supporter's Shield was created. The new shield weighs 35 pounds (16 kg) and is made of sterling silver and stainless steel. The outside of the shield contains a Telstar football design while the middle of the shield pays homage to the chevron design of the original trophy. The middle of the trophy was designed to be expandable as its winners' names are added to it annually around the chevron. The newly designed shield was first awarded to the New York Red Bulls on the final day of the 2013 MLS season.

=== 2020 cancellation and reinstatement ===
On October 17, 2020, Major League Soccer announced that, following a decision made by the ISC, the Supporters' Shield would not be awarded at the end of the 2020 regular season, largely in part due to the effects that the COVID-19 pandemic had on the league. In an official announcement, the Supporters' Shield Foundation stated, "After much consideration and discussion, the Supporters' Shield Foundation has decided to forego awarding the Supporters' Shield for the 2020 season. This is not an easy decision to make. With the inability for supporters to be in attendance and fill their stadiums with passion, however, we feel as though the current climate goes against the spirit of the Shield."

This decision caused a great amount of backlash from the MLS community, and was criticized by several members of MLS clubs, including Toronto FC head coach Greg Vanney (whose team was top of the Supporters' Shield standings at the time of the decision). Following these negative responses, on October 23 the Supporters' Shield Foundation announced they had reversed their original decision, and the Shield was reinstated for the 2020 season. The Philadelphia Union won the Supporters' Shield, but were unable to use the actual shield due to a delay in shipping from Los Angeles. A temporary replacement was fashioned from a repurposed Captain America shield with a vinyl cover by the Union's fabricator shop and lifted by the players.

== Winners ==
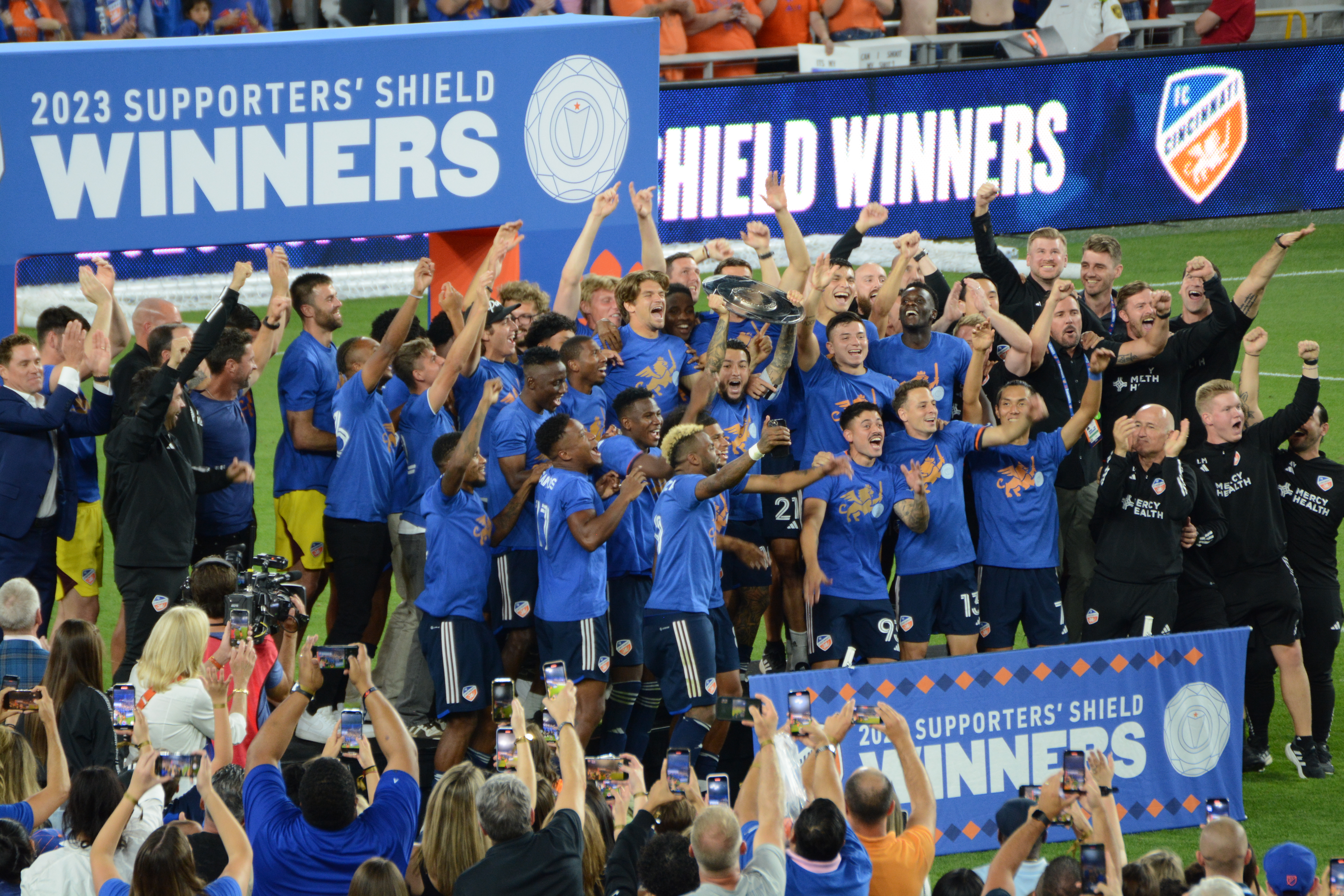
FC Cincinnati players celebrate after clinching the Supporters' Shield in 2023

Keys

Team also won the MLS Cup.
Team also won the U.S. Open Cup / Canadian Championship.
Team also won the MLS Cup and U.S. Open Cup / Canadian Championship.

Eighteen different teams have won at least one Supporters' Shield, with the LA Galaxy and D.C. United level with the most wins at four each. Seven teams have gone on to win the MLS Cup after winning the Supporters' Shield, with both the Galaxy and D.C. achieving this double twice. While three teams have secured a Supporters' Shield and U.S. Open Cup double, no American team has won all three major domestic trophies (the Supporters' Shield, MLS Cup and U.S. Open Cup). However, in the 2017 season, Toronto FC managed the Canadian version of this achievement, lifting the Supporters' Shield, MLS Cup and Canadian Championship.

Ed.	Season	Teams	Winner	Record				Points (Note: From 1996 to 1999, 3 points were awarded for a win in 90 minutes, 1 point for a shootout win, and 0 points for a loss in 90 minutes or shootout. Since the 2000 season, 3 points are awarded for a win, 1 point for a tie, and 0 points for a loss.) (PPG)	Playoffs result	Coach
Ed.	Season	Teams	Winner	Games	Won	Lost	Tied (Note: From 1996 until 1999, tied games were decided by a golden goal, culminating with a shoot-out.)	Points (PPG)	Playoffs result	Coach
1	1996	10	Tampa Bay Mutiny	32	20	12	—	58 (1.81)	Lost Conf Finals (DC)	Thomas Rongen
2	1997	10	D.C. United	32	21	11	—	55 (1.72)	Won MLS Cup	Bruce Arena
3	1998	12	Los Angeles Galaxy	32	24	8	—	68 (2.12)	Lost Conf Finals (CHI)	Octavio Zambrano
4	1999	12	D.C. United (2)	32	23	9	—	57 (1.78)	Won MLS Cup	Thomas Rongen
5	2000	12	Kansas City Wizards	32	16	7	9	57 (1.78)	Won MLS Cup	Bob Gansler
6	2001	12	Miami Fusion	26	16	5	5	53 (2.04)	Lost Semifinals (SJO)	Ray Hudson
7	2002	10	Los Angeles Galaxy (2)	28	16	9	3	51 (1.82)	Won MLS Cup	Sigi Schmid
8	2003	10	Chicago Fire	30	15	7	8	53 (1.77)	Lost MLS Cup (SJO)	Dave Sarachan
9	2004	10	Columbus Crew	30	12	5	13	49 (1.63)	Lost Conf Semifinals (NE)	Greg Andrulis
10	2005	12	San Jose Earthquakes	32	18	4	10	64 (2.00)	Lost Conf Semifinals (LA)	Dominic Kinnear
11	2006	12	D.C. United (3)	32	15	7	10	55 (1.72)	Lost Conf Finals (NE)	Piotr Nowak
12	2007	13	D.C. United (4)	30	16	7	7	55 (1.83)	Lost Conf Semifinals (CHI)	Tom Soehn
13	2008	14	Columbus Crew (2)	30	17	7	6	57 (1.90)	Won MLS Cup	Sigi Schmid
14	2009	15	Columbus Crew (3)	30	13	7	10	49 (1.63)	Lost Conf Semifinals (RSL)	Robert Warzycha
15	2010	16	Los Angeles Galaxy (3)	30	18	7	5	59 (1.97)	Lost Conf Finals (DAL)	Bruce Arena
16	2011	18	Los Angeles Galaxy (4)	34	19	5	10	67 (1.97)	Won MLS Cup	Bruce Arena
17	2012	19	San Jose Earthquakes (2)	34	19	6	9	66 (1.94)	Lost Conf Semifinals (LA)	Frank Yallop
18	2013	19	New York Red Bulls	34	17	9	8	59 (1.74)	Lost Conf Semifinals (HOU)	Mike Petke
19	2014	19	Seattle Sounders FC	34	20	10	4	64 (1.88)	Lost Conf Finals (LA)	Sigi Schmid
20	2015	20	New York Red Bulls (2)	34	18	10	6	60 (1.76)	Lost Conf Finals (CLB)	Jesse Marsch
21	2016	20	FC Dallas	34	17	8	9	60 (1.76)	Lost Conf Semifinals (SEA)	Óscar Pareja
22	2017	22	Toronto FC	34	20	5	9	69 (2.03)	Won MLS Cup	Greg Vanney
23	2018	23	New York Red Bulls (3)	34	22	7	5	71 (2.09)	Lost Conf Finals (ATL)	Chris Armas
24	2019	24	Los Angeles FC	34	21	4	9	72 (2.12)	Lost Conf Finals (SEA)	Bob Bradley
25	2020	26	Philadelphia Union	23	14	4	5	47 (2.04)	Lost first round (NE)	Jim Curtin
26	2021	27	New England Revolution	34	22	5	7	73 (2.15)	Lost Conf Semifinals (NYC)	Bruce Arena
27	2022	28	Los Angeles FC (2)	34	21	9	4	67 (1.97)	Won MLS Cup	Steve Cherundolo
28	2023	29	FC Cincinnati	34	20	5	9	69 (2.03)	Lost Conf Finals (CLB)	Pat Noonan
29	2024	29	Inter Miami CF	34	22	4	8	74 (2.18)	Lost first round (ATL)	Gerardo Martino
30	2025	30	Philadelphia Union (2)	34	20	8	6	66 (1.94)	Lost Conf Semifinals (NYC)	Bradley Carnell
31	2026	30	Nashville SC	34	23	3	8	77 (2.26)	TBD	B. J. Callaghan

== Records ==
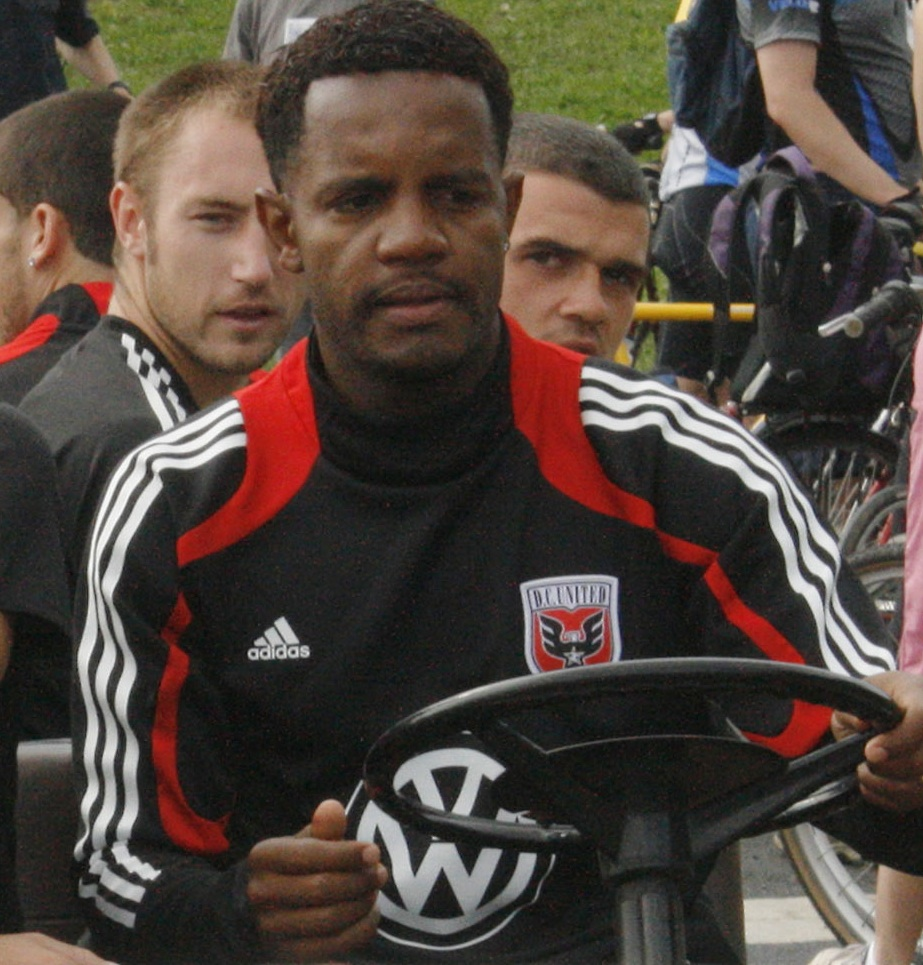
Luciano Emílio won the Golden Boot in 2007, the second year of D.C. United's back-to-back Shield winning seasons.

=== Shield winners ===
Team	Winners	Runners-up	Year(s) won	Year(s) runners-up
LA Galaxy	4	4	1998, 2002, 2010, 2011	1996, 1999, 2009, 2014
D.C. United	4	1	1997, 1999, 2006, 2007	1998
Columbus Crew	3	1	2004, 2008, 2009	2024
New York Red Bulls	3	0	2013, 2015, 2018	
San Jose Earthquakes	2	2	2005, 2012	2002, 2003
Philadelphia Union	2	1	2020, 2025	2022
Los Angeles FC	2	0	2019, 2022	
Sporting Kansas City	1	4	2000	1997, 2004, 2012, 2013
Chicago Fire	1	2	2003	2000, 2001
FC Dallas	1	2	2016	2006, 2015
Seattle Sounders FC	1	1	2014	2011
Toronto FC	1	1	2017	2020
New England Revolution	1	1	2021	2005
FC Cincinnati	1	1	2023	2025
Inter Miami CF	1	0	2024	
Nashville SC	1	0	2026	
Tampa Bay Mutiny	1	0	1996	
Miami Fusion	1	0	2001	
Colorado Rapids	0	2		2016, 2021
New York City FC	0	2		2017, 2019
Chivas USA	0	1		2007
Houston Dynamo	0	1		2008
Real Salt Lake	0	1		2010
Atlanta United FC	0	1		2018
Orlando City SC	0	1		2023
Vancouver Whitecaps FC	0	1		2026

- Defunct teams in italics.

=== Performance in CONCACAF competition ===
Before 2006, Shield winners were not guaranteed a berth into CONCACAF competitions. Most regular season champions to earn berths into CONCACAF competitions typically earned them from earning a berth into the MLS Cup, or earning a berth due to the number of berths allocated to the United States for MLS. Most times, the United States was allocated two berths into the tournament, which went to the MLS Cup champion and runner-up.

Since 2007, the Shield winner replaced the MLS Cup runner-up as the second American representative for the CONCACAF Champions' Cup. In 2008, with the arrival of the newly formatted CONCACAF Champions League, the Shield winner, along with the MLS Cup winner both earned direct byes into the group stage of the Champions League.

Toronto FC and Los Angeles FC are the only Shield winners to reach the final of a CONCACAF competition. However, as a Canadian team, Toronto FC qualified for the tournament by winning the Canadian Championship and not the Supporters' Shield. D.C. United and the New York Red Bulls hold the record for the earliest exit in a CONCACAF competition as the Shield winners, being eliminated from the group stage in the 2008–09 and 2014–15 editions of the Champions League, respectively.

Key

Champions	Runners-up	Semi-finals

- QR1 = Qualification first round
- PR = Preliminary round
- GS = Group stage
- R16 = Round of 16
- QF = Quarter-finals
- SF = Semi-finals or consolation match
- F = Final

Performance table

Season	Shield winner	Result
1997	Did not qualify	
1998	Did not qualify	
1999	Los Angeles Galaxy	QR1
2000	D.C. United	SF
2002	Kansas City Wizards	SF
2003	Los Angeles Galaxy	QF
2004	Chicago Fire	SF
2005	Did not qualify	
2006	Did not qualify	
2007	D.C. United	SF
2008	D.C. United	SF
2008–09	D.C. United	GS
2009–10	Columbus Crew	QF
2010–11	Columbus Crew	QF
2011–12	Los Angeles Galaxy	QF
2012–13	Los Angeles Galaxy	SF
2013–14	San Jose Earthquakes	QF
2014–15	New York Red Bulls	GS
2015–16	Seattle Sounders FC	QF
2016–17	New York Red Bulls	QF
2018	Toronto FC (Note: Toronto FC participated in the 2018 CONCACAF Champions League by virtue of their Canadian Championship win, not the Supporters' Shield.)	F
2019	New York Red Bulls (Note: Due to the restructuring of the 2019 CONCACAF Champions League, the United States' berths were allocated to the 2017 and 2018 MLS Cup winners and the 2017 and 2018 U.S. Open Cup winners, and the 2017 and 2018 Supporters' Shield winners were not guaranteed a berth. As Toronto FC won MLS Cup 2017, the vacated berth was reallocated to the New York Red Bulls as the U.S.-based non-champion with the best aggregate record for the 2017 and 2018 MLS regular seasons.)	QF
2020	Los Angeles FC	F
2021	Philadelphia Union	SF
2022	New England Revolution	QF
2023	Los Angeles FC	F
2024	FC Cincinnati	R16
2025	Inter Miami CF	SF
2026	Philadelphia Union	R16
2027	Nashville SC	TBD

== See also ==
- List of American and Canadian soccer champions
- CPL Shield, a Canadian Premier League trophy with the same function as the MLS Supporters' Shield
- Presidents' Trophy, an NHL trophy with the same function as the MLS Supporters' Shield
- Maurice Podoloff Trophy, an NBA trophy with the same function as the MLS Supporters' Shield
- NWSL Shield, a National Women's Soccer League trophy with the same function as the MLS Supporters' Shield
- Minor premiership, a similar concept in Australian sports leagues
- Major League Soccer's Wooden Spoon award
