= Yoann Damet =

French football manager

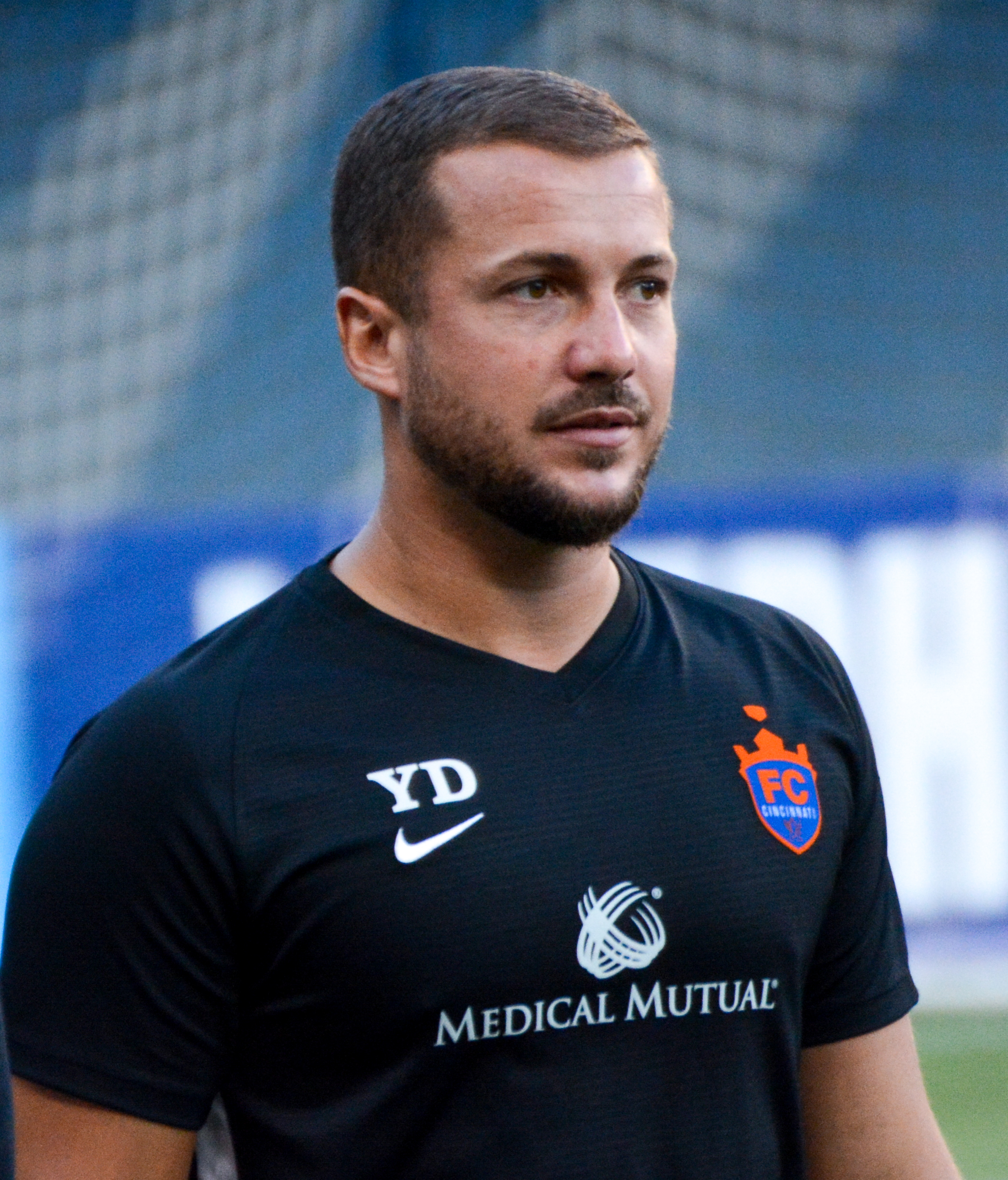
- Damet with FC Cincinnati in 2018

Personal information
- Date of birth: 19 March 1990 (age 36)
- Place of birth: Marseille, France

Team information
- Current team: St. Louis City SC (head coach)

Managerial career
- Years: Team
- 2017–2021: FC Cincinnati (assistant)
- 2019: FC Cincinnati (interim)
- 2020: FC Cincinnati (interim)
- 2021: United States U20 (assistant)
- 2022: LA Galaxy II
- 2022: LA Galaxy (assistant)
- 2023–2025: Columbus Crew (assistant)
- 2026–: St. Louis City SC

Yoann Damet (born 19 March 1990) is a French professional association football coach who is currently the head coach of Major League Soccer club St. Louis City SC.

Damet began his managerial career at age 16, coaching several youth squads in France and Canada. He then spent four years as an assistant coach with FC Cincinnati, twice serving as interim head coach. At 29 years of age, Damet was the youngest head or assistant coach in Major League Soccer when Cincinnati joined the league in 2019. He then served in assistant and second-team coaching roles at LA Galaxy and Columbus Crew. In December 2025, he was named head coach of St. Louis City SC, his first permanent position as head coach of a top-division team.

== Early life ==
Damet was born on 19 March 1990 in Marseille, France. He first started playing football at age 8 following the 1998 FIFA World Cup, which was both hosted and won by France. At age 17 he played club football at the fifth tier of the French league system. However, he did not think he would make it to a professional level as a player, so he developed an early interest in coaching. In 2011, he earned a degree in sports training with a specialty in football from the University of Burgundy in Dijon, France.

== Career ==
=== Youth coaching ===
Damet began his managerial career at age 16 with the sixth-tier club Beaune, where he coached the under-13 level from 2006 to 2011. He then moved on to the fourth division club Jura Sud, where he was the head coach of the U-15 and U-17 teams from 2011 to 2012. He also spent a season managing the U-14 district tournament of the department of Jura in the Bourgogne-Franche-Comté region. In 2013, he joined the academy staff of Dijon, then in Ligue 2, and served as the U-11 head coach.

In 2014, he moved to Canada to work for the Montreal Impact Academy. Initially he worked as the U-12 head coach, then became the U-18 head coach in December 2015.

=== FC Cincinnati ===
In March 2017, he left Montreal to join FC Cincinnati in the United Soccer League as an assistant coach. FC Cincinnati retained Damet through their transition up to Major League Soccer in 2019.

On 7 May 2019, Cincinnati head coach Alan Koch was fired after starting the season with just 8 points through 11 games and, according to club president Jeff Berding, "a series of recent issues and a team culture that had deteriorated". As a result, Damet was named interim head coach while an international search was undertaken for a permanent replacement. At 29 years old, Damet was the youngest head or assistant coach in the league.

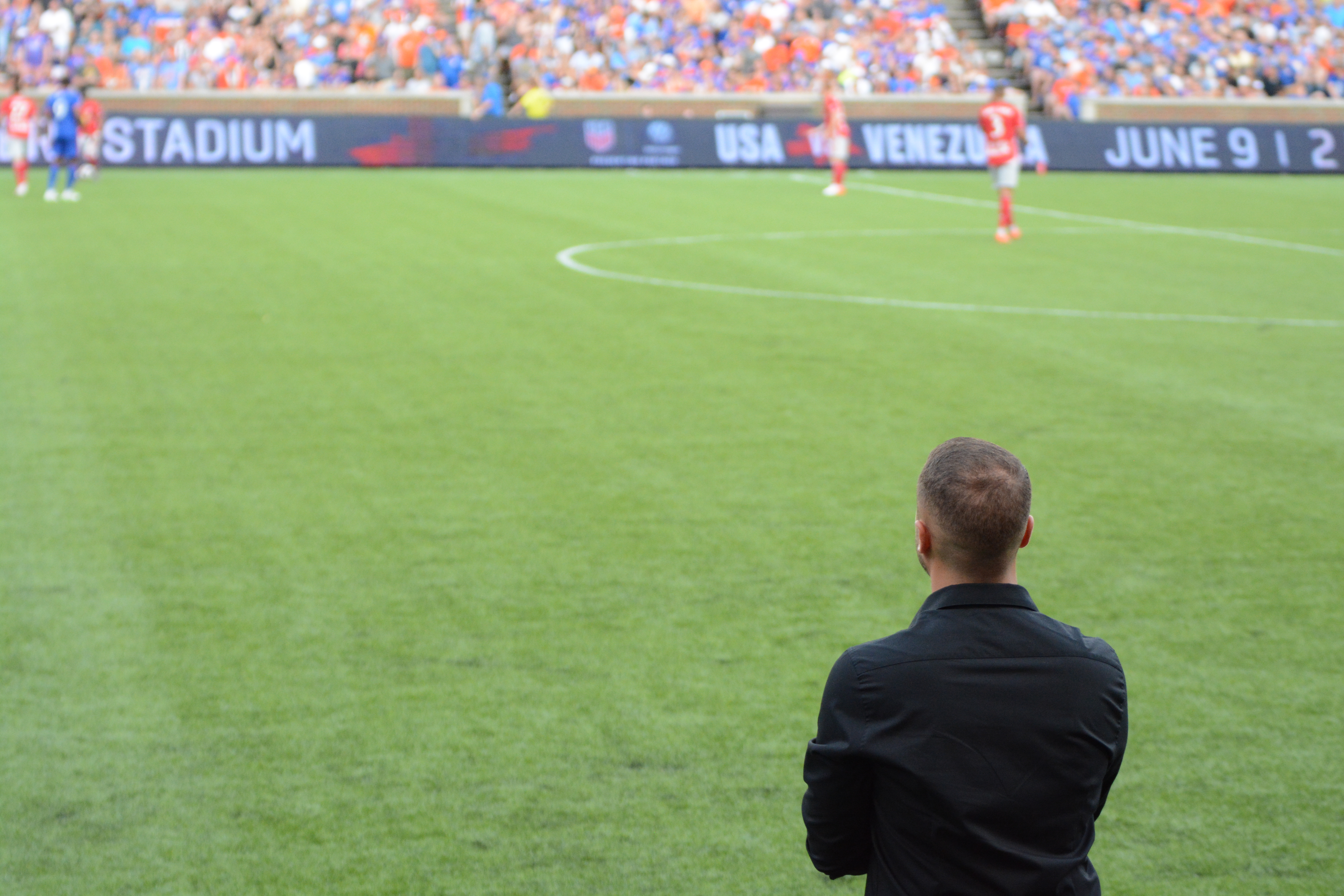
Damet during his 2019 stint as interim head coach of FC Cincinnati

Damet's first match as head coach was a 2–1 win on 11 May against his former club Montreal Impact. This ended both a seven-match winless streak and a 528-minute scoring drought for the club. However, this was followed by another losing streak which lasted six regular season matches. Damet's tenure as interim coach ended after 15 matches when FC Cincinnati announced the hiring of Ron Jans on 4 August.

Jans resigned from his head coach position on 17 February 2020 amidst an investigation into his alleged use of a racial slur. The club once again selected Damet to serve as interim coach while a permanent replacement was sought.

On 27 September 2021, Damet was released from the club along with head coach Jaap Stam and fellow assistant coach Said Bakkati.

=== LA Galaxy ===
Damet was named head coach of LA Galaxy II in USL Championship on 28 January 2022. Damet joined the LA Galaxy first team staff as an assistant coach on 26 August 2022.

=== Columbus Crew ===
On 17 January 2023, Columbus Crew announced the hire of several first-team coaching staffers, including Damet as an assistant coach. The hires came one month after Wilfried Nancy had taken over as Columbus's head coach in December. During Damet's time with the club, Columbus won MLS Cup 2023 and the 2024 Leagues Cup.

=== St. Louis City SC ===
After Nancy departed Columbus for Scottish club Celtic on 3 December 2025, some media outlets mentioned Damet as a possible next head coach for the club. But instead, on 16 December, Damet was named as the new head coach of St. Louis City SC, his first permanent head coaching position in Major League Soccer. Damet's hire came seven months after the firing of his predecessor, Olof Mellberg, and one month after the hire of sporting director Corey Wray.

== Managerial statistics ==
As of 7 November 2026

Managerial record by team and tenure
Team	Nat	From	To	Record								Ref
Team	Nat	From	To	G	W	D	L	GF	GA	GD	Win %	Ref
FC Cincinnati (interim)	(United States)	7 May 2019	4 August 2019	15	4	0	11	17	40	−23	26.67	
FC Cincinnati (interim)	(United States)	17 February 2020	21 May 2020	2	0	0	2	3	5	−2	0.00	
LA Galaxy II	(United States)	28 January 2022	1 July 2022	18	7	3	8	26	33	−7	38.89	
St. Louis City SC	(United States)	16 December 2025	Present	38	17	10	11	67	53	+14	44.74	
Total				73	28	13	32	113	131	−18	38.36	

== Honours ==
=== Head coach ===
St. Louis City SC

- U.S. Open Cup: 2026

=== Assistant coach ===
Columbus Crew

- MLS Cup: 2023
- Eastern Conference: 2023
