= Martín Perelman =

Argentine football manager (born 1986)

- Perelman with Orlando City in 2026

Personal information
- Date of birth: August 20, 1986 (age 40)
- Place of birth: Buenos Aires, Argentina
- Height: 1.81 m (5 ft 11 in)
- Position: Midfielder

Team information
- Current team: Orlando City (interim head coach)

Youth career
- Defensores de Belgrano

Senior career*
Years	Team	Apps	(Gls)
2006	Excursionistas	0	(0)
2006–2007	Hapoel Tel Aviv	0	(0)
2007–2008	Wellington United	0	(0)
2008–2009	Hapoel Be'er Sheva	0	(0)
2009–2010	Yupanqui	15	(0)
2010–2011	Centro Español	17	(0)
2011	El Porvenir	0	(0)
2012	Berazategui	3	(0)
2012–2013	Sportivo Italiano	9	(0)
2013–2014	Zakynthos	6	(0)
2014	Asteras Magoula	9	(0)
2014–2015	PSM Futbol	14	(0)
2015	Deportivo Armenio	0	(0)
2016–2019	Argentino de Merlo	45	(0)
Total		118	(0)

Managerial career
- 2019: Argentino de Merlo
- 2021: Cañuelas
- 2021–2022: Comunicaciones
- 2022–2024: Orlando City B
- 2024–2026: Orlando City (assistant)
- 2026–: Orlando City (interim)
- * Club domestic league appearances and goals

Martín Perelman (born 20 August 1986) is an Argentine professional football manager and former player who is currently the interim head coach of Major League Soccer club Orlando City.

== Playing career ==
Born in Buenos Aires, Perelman came through the youth ranks of Defensores de Belgrano before moving abroad, making his professional debut with Hapoel Tel Aviv in Israel. He followed that up with stints at Wellington United in New Zealand and for clubs in Greece, before returning to Argentina, where he played for semi-professional teams before retiring as a player at Argentino de Merlo at the age of 31.

== Coaching career ==
Perelman began his coaching career at Argentino de Merlo in May 2019. In February 2021 he took over Cañuelas, before moving to Comunicaciones in August 2021.

On 11 March 2026, Orlando City announced that long-term head coach Óscar Pareja and the club had reached a mutual agreement to terminate his contract, and that assistant head coach Diego Torres would be leaving the club with him. Perelman took over as interim head coach, with Orlando City B head coach Manual Goldberg being appointed as interim assistant head coach. On 9 June, Orlando City sporting director and general manager Ricardo Moreira confirmed that Perelman would continue as interim head coach following the mid-season break caused by the 2026 FIFA World Cup.

== Personal life ==
Perelman is Jewish and nationalized as Israeli, which allowed him to be considered a local player while playing in Israel. He graduated as a psychologist while playing football, and ventured into business with a sports brand, GIOCO Indumentaria.
