= Matt Wells (football manager) =

English football coach

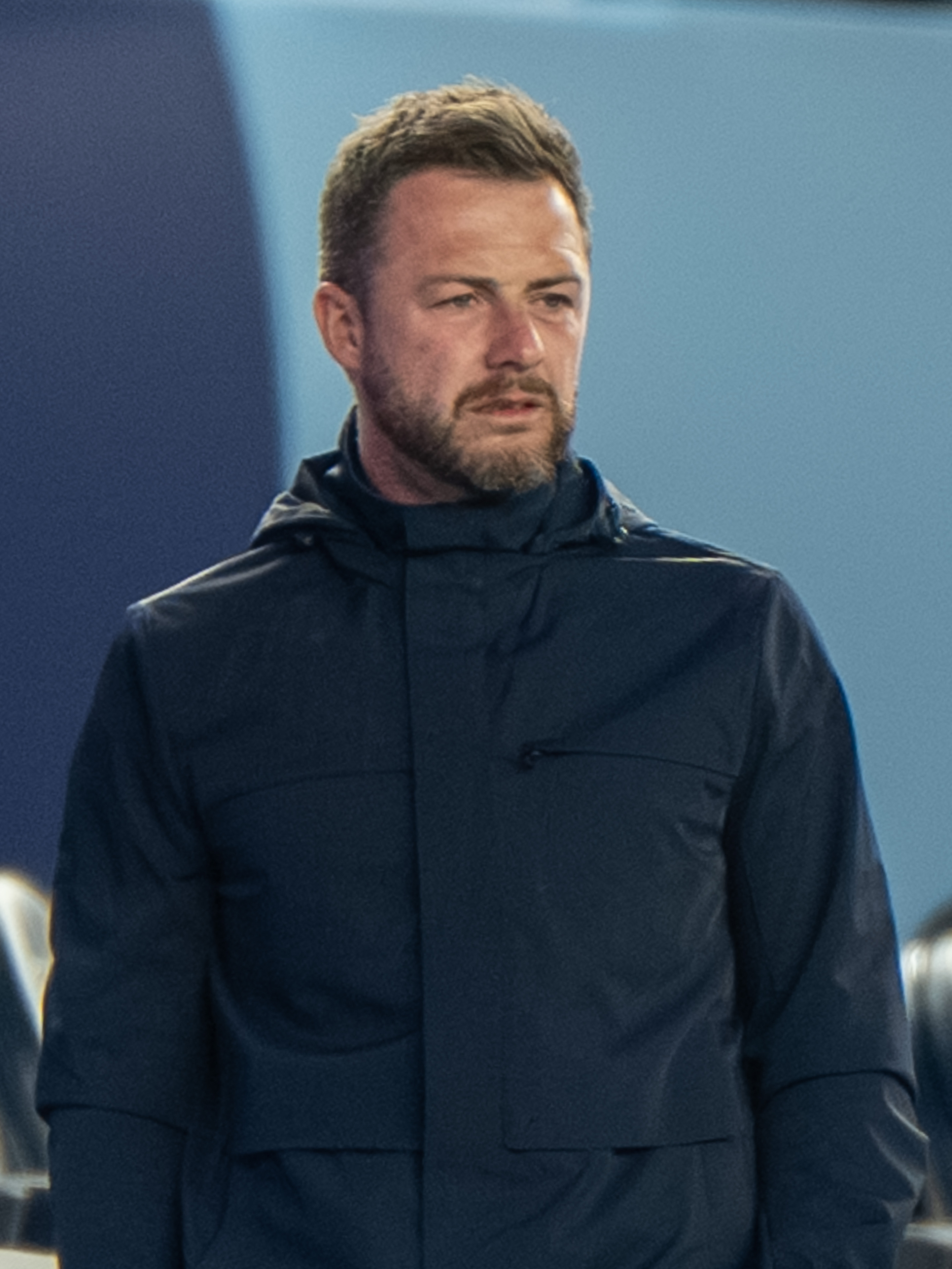
- Matt Wells with the Colorado Rapids in 2026

Personal information
- Full name: Matthew Elliott Wells
- Date of birth: 22 September 1988 (age 38)
- Place of birth: Enfield, London, England
- Height: 5 ft 11 in (1.80 m)
- Position: Central midfielder

Team information
- Current team: Colorado Rapids (head coach)

Youth career
- Years: Team
- 1997–2008: Tottenham Hotspur

Managerial career
- 2025–: Colorado Rapids

Matthew Elliott Wells (born 22 September 1988) is an English professional football coach and former player, who played as a central midfielder. He is currently the head coach of Major League Soccer club Colorado Rapids.

Wells worked his way up through the youth ranks of Tottenham Hotspur, from the age of nine. Unfortunately, Wells never made a senior debut, with his career at the North London club severely hampered by injuries. As a result, he focused upon football coaching and successfully gained his UEFA B Licence at the age of just 20, whilst learning from the likes of John McDermott and Alex Inglethorpe.

== Early life ==
Wells was born in Enfield, Greater London, and attended The John Warner School in Hoddesdon.

== Coaching career ==
Wells was formerly the assistant coach to Ugo Ehiogu and Scott Parker at Tottenham Hotspur's development squad and under-18s respectively, going on to become head coach for the under-18s at the start of the 2018-2019 season. He left Spurs in March 2019 to rejoin Parker, who was at that time in interim charge at Fulham. He later became assistant head coach to Parker at AFC Bournemouth and, on 31 December 2022, he joined Parker's coaching team at Club Brugge. On 25 April 2023, Wells was confirmed as the acting assistant head coach at Tottenham Hotspur, becoming one of the assistant coaches to Ange Postecoglou on 27 June 2023 and the senior assistant coach on 25 June 2024. He reverted from senior assistant to assistant in July 2025.

On 23 December 2025, the MLS club Colorado Rapids appointed Wells as their head coach.

== Personal life ==
Wells is the grandson of former Wales international and Tottenham Hotspur player, Cliff Jones. He is also the cousin of professional footballer, Scott Neilson, who had spells at Crawley Town, Luton Town, and Grimsby Town, amongst others.

== Managerial statistics ==
As of 7 November 2026

Managerial record by team and tenure
Team	Nat.	From	To	Record							
Team	Nat.	From	To	G	W	D	L	GF	GA	GD	Win %
Colorado Rapids	(United States)	23 December 2025	present	37	14	8	15	52	52	+0	37.84
