= 2022 Orlando City B season =

Orlando City B
2022 season
- Manager: Martín Perelman
- Stadium: Osceola County Stadium
- MLS Next Pro: 9th
- Playoffs: DNQ
- Biggest win: ORL 6–0 MIA (May 2)
- Biggest defeat: CLB 6–1 ORL (June 19); PHI 6–1 ORL (September 11)

The 2022 Orlando City B season was the club's fifth season of existence and their first since returning from hiatus during the 2021 season. It is the debut season as a founding member of MLS Next Pro after most recently competing in USL League One.

Martín Perelman was appointed head coach on March 9, 2022.

== Roster ==
As of August 20, 2022

No.	Nationality	Name	Position(s)	Date of birth (age)	Previous club	Notes
Goalkeepers
31	(United States)	Mason Stajduhar	GK	December 2, 1997 (aged 24)	(United States) Orlando City U-23	First team
40	(United States)	Adam Grinwis	GK	April 21, 1992 (aged 29)	(United States) Sacramento Republic	First team
50	(Venezuela)	Javier Otero	GK	November 18, 2002 (aged 19)	(United States) Orlando City Development Academy	–
60	(Colombia)	Isaac Delgado	GK	December 30, 2004 (aged 17)	(United States) Orlando City Development Academy	Academy
70	(United States)	Dominic Pereira	GK	February 26, 2005 (aged 17)	(United States) Orlando City Development Academy	Academy
Defenders
15	(Argentina)	Rodrigo Schlegel	DF	April 3, 1997 (aged 24)	(Argentina) Racing Club	First team
26	(United States)	Michael Halliday	DF	January 22, 2003 (aged 19)	(United States) Orlando City Development Academy	First team
30	(United States)	Alex Freeman	DF	August 9, 2004 (aged 17)	(United States) Orlando City Development Academy	First team
35	(United States)	Brandon Hackenberg	DF	July 2, 1997 (aged 24)	(United States) Penn State Nittany Lions	–
41	(Argentina)	Ignacio Galván	DF	September 6, 2002 (aged 19)	(Argentina) Racing Club	Loan
43	(Argentina)	Matias Cruz	DF	February 1, 2002 (aged 20)	(United States) Lake Erie Storm	–
44	(United States)	Liam Guske	DF	March 24, 2004 (aged 18)	(United States) Orlando City Development Academy	Academy
53	(Peru)	Quembol Guadalupe	DF	February 3, 2004 (aged 18)	(United States) Orlando City Development Academy	–
58	(United States)	Owen Van Marter	DF	February 2, 2004 (aged 18)	(United States) Orlando City Development Academy	Academy
61	(United States)	Tahir Reid-Brown	DF	July 2, 2006 (aged 15)	(United States) Orlando City Development Academy	Academy
62	(United States)	Andrew Forth	DF	October 9, 1998 (aged 23)	(United States) Cal Poly Mustangs	–
64	(United States)	Dominic Bell	DF	April 6, 2006 (aged 15)	(United States) Orlando City Development Academy	Academy
68	(United States)	Thomas Williams	DF	August 15, 2004 (aged 17)	(United States) Orlando City Development Academy	First team
87	(United States)	Tyler Prebenda	DF	May 24, 2005 (aged 16)	(United States) Orlando City Development Academy	Academy
	(United States)	Zach Martens	DF	January 11, 2004 (aged 18)	(United States) Orlando City Development Academy	Academy
Midfielders
16	(Peru)	Wilder Cartagena	MF	September 23, 1994 (aged 27)	(United Arab Emirates) Al-Ittihad Kalba	First team, loan
23	(Republic of Ireland)	Jake Mulraney	MF	April 5, 1996 (aged 25)	(United States) Atlanta United FC	First team
34	(Jamaica)	Joey DeZart	MF	June 9, 1998 (aged 23)	(United States) Wake Forest Demon Deacons	First team
42	(United States)	David Boccuzzo	MF	January 9, 2004 (aged 18)	(United States) Orlando City Development Academy	Academy
45	(Honduras)	Brian Lopez	MF	June 15, 2003 (aged 18)	(United States) Orlando City Development Academy	Academy
46	(United States)	Theo Franca	MF	March 25, 2007 (aged 15)	(United States) Orlando City Development Academy	Academy
47	(Brazil)	Victor Yan	MF	April 9, 2001 (aged 20)	(Brazil) Santos	–
48	(United States)	Diego Pareja	MF	October 7, 2000 (aged 21)	(United States) MSU Mustangs	–
54	(Honduras)	Erick Gunera-Calix	MF	November 26, 2002 (aged 19)	(United States) FC Dallas	–
56	(Ecuador)	Neicer Acosta	MF	December 12, 2002 (aged 19)	(Ecuador) Independiente del Valle	–
57	(United States)	Diego Valles	MF	December 8, 2004 (aged 17)	(United States) Orlando City Development Academy	Academy
59	(Spain)	Alejandro Granados	MF	May 30, 2006 (aged 15)	(United States) Orlando City Development Academy	Academy
63	(United States)	Favian Loyola	MF	May 18, 2005 (aged 16)	(United States) Orlando City Development Academy	Academy
79	(Mexico)	Jared Romero	MF	December 6, 2000 (aged 21)	(Mexico) Tijuana	
96	(United States)	Zakaria Taifi	MF	October 1, 2005 (aged 16)	(United States) Orlando City Development Academy	Academy
Forwards
20	(United States)	Nicholas Gioacchini	FW	July 25, 2000 (aged 21)	(France) Caen	First team
27	(United States)	Jack Lynn	FW	January 12, 2000 (aged 22)	(United States) Notre Dame Fighting Irish	First team
32	(Puerto Rico)	Wilfredo Rivera	FW	October 14, 2003 (aged 18)	(United States) Orlando City Development Academy	First team
49	(Puerto Rico)	Ian Silva	FW	November 6, 2004 (aged 17)	(United States) Orlando City Development Academy	Academy
51	(Venezuela)	Moises Tablante	FW	July 4, 2001 (aged 20)	(United States) Orlando City Development Academy	–
52	(United States)	Gonzalo Agustoni-Chagas	FW	February 25, 2004 (aged 18)	(United States) FC Dallas	–
55	(United States)	Ethan Subachan	FW	June 2, 2005 (aged 16)	(United States) Orlando City Development Academy	Academy
65	(Spain)	Mauro Bravo	FW	July 30, 1999 (aged 22)	(United States) FIU Panthers	–
66	(Spain)	Alejo Tangredi	FW	November 23, 2004 (aged 17)	(United States) Orlando City Development Academy	Academy
67	(Cambodia)	Nick Taylor	FW	September 2, 1998 (aged 23)	(United States) UCF Knights	–
77	(Colombia)	Iván Angulo	FW	March 22, 1999 (aged 23)	(Brazil) Palmeiras	First team, loan

== Competitions ==
=== MLS Next Pro ===
For the 2022 season, MLS Next Pro is split into four divisions across two conferences. Orlando were placed in the Central Division of the Eastern Conference. In total, eight teams will qualify for the playoffs: the four divisional winners plus the two teams with the next most points in each conference. In the event a match is tied after 90 minutes, each team will receive a single point with an additional bonus point awarded to the winner of a penalty shootout.

==== Match results ====
March 26 1	Orlando City B	2–0	Chicago Fire FC II	Kissimmee, Florida
3:00pm	Gunera-Calix (yellow card) 30' (yellow-red card) 63'; Lynn 50', 87'	Report	Ostrem (yellow card) 16'; Reynolds (red card) 37'; Espinonza (yellow card) 56'	Stadium: Osceola County Stadium; Referee: Gabriele Giusti

April 3 2	Orlando City B	2–2 (5–4 SO)	New York City FC II	Kissimmee, Florida
6:00pm	Tablante 18'; Williams (yellow card) 32'; Boccuzzo 39' (pen.); Rivera (yellow card) 73'	Report	Denis 36' (pen.); Hot 45+3', (yellow card) 80'; Haxhari (yellow card) 85'	Stadium: Osceola County Stadium; Referee: Brandon Stevis
	Shootout
	Boccuzzo (penalty scored); Bravo (penalty scored); DeZart (penalty missed); Lynn (penalty scored); Guske (penalty scored); Tablante (penalty scored)		(penalty scored) Denis; (penalty scored) Beer; (penalty scored) Elias; (penalty scored) Benalcazar; (penalty missed) Turnbull; (penalty missed) Jimenez

April 10 3	Inter Miami CF II	2–0	Orlando City B	Fort Lauderdale, Florida
5:30pm	Rodríguez 17', (yellow card) 45+3'; Borgelin (yellow card) 30', (goal) 55'; Beckham (yellow card) 72'; Neville (yellow card) 90+4'	Report	Williams (yellow card) 11'	Stadium: DRV PNK Stadium; Referee: Adam Kilpatrick

April 15 4	Columbus Crew 2	2–0	Orlando City B	Columbus, Ohio
7:00pm	Russell-Rowe 45+3'; Hurtado 81'; Parente (yellow card) 86'	Report	Yan (yellow card) 45+1'; Bravo (yellow card) 75'	Stadium: Historic Crew Stadium; Referee: Alex Billeter

April 24 5	Orlando City B	0–0 (4–3 SO)	New England Revolution II	Orlando, Florida
6:30pm	Gunera-Calix (yellow card) 59' (yellow-red card) 68'; Boccuzzo (yellow card) 86'	Report	Zwetsloot (yellow card) 33'	Stadium: Exploria Stadium; Referee: Amiel Aleman
	Shootout
	Boccuzzo (penalty scored); Acosta (penalty missed); Tablante (penalty scored); Franca (penalty scored); Granados (penalty scored)		(penalty missed) O'Hearn; (penalty scored) Buck; (penalty scored) Reveno; (penalty missed) Cayet; (penalty scored) Fujiwara
Note: Double header with Orlando City SC

April 29	Rochester New York FC	P–P	Orlando City B	Brighton, New York
7:00pm				Stadium: John L. DiMarco Field
Note: Postponed due to stadium seating issue

May 16 6	Philadelphia Union II	1–0	Orlando City B	Chester, Pennsylvania
7:00pm	Sorenson (yellow card) 43'; Aaronson 51'; Darboe (yellow card) 68'	Report	Guske (yellow card) 29'; Rivera (yellow card) 32'; Lopez (yellow card) 70'; Tablante (yellow card) 71'; Yan (yellow card) 74'	Stadium: Subaru Park; Referee: John Griggs

May 21 7	Orlando City B	6–0	Inter Miami CF II	Kissimmee, Florida
6:00pm	Lynn 8', 63', 85'; Rivera 21', (yellow card) 57'; Hackenberg 31'; Yan 74'	Report	Cremaschi (yellow card) 12'; Hardin (yellow card) 42' (yellow-red card) 45+1'; Allen (yellow card) 62'	Stadium: Osceola County Stadium; Referee: Anya Voigt

May 29 8	Orlando City B	3–5	FC Cincinnati 2	Kissimmee, Florida
7:00pm	Tablante 14', (yellow card) 54'; Lynn 24', 64' (pen.); Freeman (yellow card) 54'; Boccuzzo (yellow card) 56'; Rivera (yellow card) 66'; Van Marter (yellow card) 73'	Report	Markanich 23', 43'; Hackenberg 48' (o.g.); Flanagan 79'; Kamdem (yellow card) 82'; Ruszel (yellow card) 83'; Akindele 85'	Stadium: Osceola County Stadium; Referee: Amiel Aleman

June 4 9	Orlando City B	1–1 (3–5 SO)	New York City FC II	Kissimmee, Florida
7:00pm	Lynn 14'; Hackenberg (yellow card) 48'; Yan (yellow card) 61'; Granados (yellow card) 86'; Van Marter (yellow card) 90+1'	Report	Turnbull (yellow card) 52'; Denis 62'; Owusu (yellow card) 90+3'	Stadium: Osceola County Stadium; Referee: Adam Brzozowiec
	Shootout
	Boccuzzo (penalty scored); Lynn (penalty scored); Guske (penalty scored); Bravo (penalty missed)		(penalty scored) Denis; (penalty scored) Murania Yankowitz; (penalty scored) Elias; (penalty scored) Benalcazar; (penalty scored) Beer

June 11 10	New England Revolution II	2–1	Orlando City B	Foxborough, Massachusetts
8:00pm	Buck 5'; Rozhanksy (yellow card) 38'; Dias 56'	Report	Otero (yellow card) 5'; Granados (yellow card) 44'; Forth (yellow card) 57'; Tablante (yellow card) 65'; Lynn 71'; Bravo (yellow card) 77'; Guadelupe (red card) 90+3'	Stadium: Gillette Stadium; Referee: José Carlos Rivero

June 19 11	Columbus Crew 2	6–1	Orlando City B	Columbus, Ohio
2:00pm	Fuson 16'; Micaletto 20' (pen.); Russell-Rowe 25', 32'; Telfer 51'; Zawadzki (yellow card) 54'; Morris (yellow card) 71'; Angking 84'	Report	Gunera-Calix (yellow card) 42'; Otero (yellow card) 52'; Taylor 72'; Tablante (yellow card) 89'	Stadium: Historic Crew Stadium; Referee: Ricardo Fierro

June 25 12	FC Cincinnati 2	1–3	Orlando City B	Highland Heights, Kentucky
1:00pm	Cruz 35'; Kann (yellow card) 58'; Ramathan (yellow card) 60'; Markanich (yellow card) 65'	Report	Lynn 22'; Hackenberg (yellow card) 29'; Bravo 30'; Forth (yellow card) 76'; Tablante 85'; Pareja (yellow card) 90+5'	Stadium: NKU Soccer Stadium; Referee: Laura Waliski

July 1 13	Rochester New York FC	3–2	Orlando City B	Brighton, New York
7:00pm	Batista 19', (yellow card) 69'; Rayo 45+1', 62'; Garrett (yellow card) 68'; Rissi (yellow card) 71'; Lopez (yellow card) 82'	Report	Yan (yellow card) 54'; Lynn 65'; Rivera (yellow card) 69'; Acosta 90+6'	Stadium: John L. DiMarco Field; Referee: Kaitlyn Trowbridge
Note: Rescheduled from April 29

July 10 14	Orlando City B	1–3	Inter Miami CF II	Kissimmee, Florida
7:00pm	Tablante 13', (yellow card) 89'; Acosta (yellow card) 20'	Report	Neville (yellow card) 30'; Batiste (yellow card) 52'; Taghvai-Najib (yellow card) 64'; Hundal 70' (pen.); Borgelin 78'; Beckham 84'	Stadium: Osceola County Stadium; Referee: Greg Dopka

July 17 15	Chicago Fire FC II	3–4	Orlando City B	Bridgeview, Illinois
7:00pm	Quintos (yellow card) 5'; Bezerra 35', 39', 49'; Kidd (yellow card) 58'	Report	Lynn 19'; Freeman (yellow card) 40'; Loyola 70', 83'; Gunera-Calix (yellow card) 80'; Pareja (yellow card) 88'; Acosta 90'	Stadium: SeatGeek Stadium; Referee: Rebecca Pagan

July 24 16	Orlando City B	1–3	Philadelphia Union II	Kissimmee, Florida
7:00pm	Otero (red card) 77'; Pareja (yellow card) 82' (yellow-red card) 90+6'; Subachan 85'; Forth (yellow card) 90+5'	Report	Perdomo (yellow card) 9'; Diallo (yellow card) 24'; Real 52'; Freese (red card) 69'; Bueno 87'; Pierre 90+4', (yellow card) 90+4'; Villero (yellow card) 90+6'	Stadium: Osceola County Stadium; Referee: Anya Voigt

August 7 17	Toronto FC II	3–0	Orlando City B	Toronto, Ontario, Canada
7:00pm	Perruzza (yellow card) 39'; Goulbourne (yellow card) 48'; Walkes 67', 84'; Altobelli 71'; Antonoglou (yellow card) 89'	Report	Forth (yellow card) 24'; Gunera-Calix (yellow card) 54'; Acosta (yellow card) 77'	Stadium: York Lions Stadium; Referee: Sebastian Noshinravani

August 12 18	New York City FC II	0–2	Orlando City B	Queens, New York
8:00pm		Report	Lynn 30', 51'; Pareja (yellow card) 34'; Yan (yellow card) 56'; Forth (yellow card) 66'; Silva (red card) 90+3'	Stadium: Belson Stadium; Referee: José Carlos Rivero

August 17 19	Orlando City B	5–2	Rochester New York FC	Kissimmee, Florida
7:00pm	Mulraney (yellow card) 13'; Akindele 34'; Lynn 47'; Cartagena 58'; Angulo 68'; Loyola 69'	Report	Batiz 25'; Wood (yellow card) 33'; Lopez (yellow card) 57'; Djaló 72'; Costa (yellow card) 85'	Stadium: Osceola County Stadium; Referee: Katherine McCormick

August 20 20	Orlando City B	2–2 (1–3 SO)	Columbus Crew 2	Kissimmee, Florida
7:00pm	Tablante 19', (yellow card) 35' (yellow-red card) 90'; Acosta 25' (pen.); Loyola (yellow card) 28'; Yan (yellow card) 39'; Williams (yellow card) 42'; Freeman (yellow card) 45+3'; Galván (yellow card) 58'; Subachan (red card) 85'; Otero (yellow card) 89'	Report	Parente 7' (pen.); Mohamed (yellow card) 24'; Weber (yellow card) 68'; Micaletto 76'	Stadium: Osceola County Stadium; Referee: Abdou Ndiaye
	Shootout
	Taylor (penalty missed); Galván (penalty missed); Freeman (penalty scored); Gunera-Calix (penalty missed)		(penalty missed) Mohamed; (penalty scored) Russell-Rowe; (penalty scored) Vang; (penalty scored) Parente

August 29 21	Orlando City B	2–2 (6–7 SO)	FC Cincinnati 2	Kissimmee, Florida
7:00pm	Loyola 14', 60'; Yan (yellow card) 25'; Pareja (yellow card) 33'; Freeman (yellow card) 40'; Forth (yellow card) 75'	Report	Musa (yellow card) 38'; Harris 54'; Markanich 56'	Stadium: Osceola County Stadium; Referee: Luis Arroyo
	Shootout
	Loyola (penalty scored); Williams (penalty scored); Hackenberg (penalty scored); Prebenda (penalty scored); Granados (penalty scored); Otero (penalty scored); Forth (penalty missed)		(penalty scored) Harris; (penalty scored) Musa; (penalty scored) Marshall; (penalty scored) Turcios; (penalty scored) Daley; (penalty scored) Thomas; (penalty scored) Bailey

September 3 22	New England Revolution II	2–0	Orlando City B	Foxborough, Massachusetts
7:00pm	Fry 40'; Ítalo 53', (yellow card) 90+1'; Lima (yellow card) 63'; Silva (yellow card) 70'	Report	Williams (yellow card) 32'; Loyola (yellow card) 48'; Reid-Brown (yellow card) 77'; Yan (yellow card) 82'; Prebenda (yellow card) 89'	Stadium: Gillette Stadium; Referee: Wes Caouette

September 11 23	Philadelphia Union II	6–1	Orlando City B	Chester, Pennsylvania
1:00pm	Donovan 6', 22'; Bueno (yellow card) 9'; Sullivan 24', 25'; Riasco 46', (yellow card) 78'; Harriel (yellow card) 53'; Aaronson 56' (pen.)	Report	Reid-Brown (yellow card) 2'; Romero (yellow card) 45'; Forth (yellow card) 55'; Loyola 69', (yellow card) 85'; Granados (yellow card) 74'	Stadium: Subaru Park; Referee: Sergii Demianchuk

September 18 24	Orlando City B	1–2	Toronto FC II	Kissimmee, Florida
3:00pm	Granados (yellow card) 9'; Tablante 55'; Gunera-Calix (yellow card) 60'; Yan (yellow card) 69'; Galván (yellow card) 72'; Forth (yellow card) 75'	Report	Goulbourne (yellow card) 41'; Curic (yellow card) 62'; Altobelli (yellow card) 67'; Walkes 86'; Franklin 90', (yellow card) 90+1'	Stadium: Osceola County Stadium; Referee: Matthew Franz

==== Standings ====
Eastern Conference

Pos	Div	Team	Pld	W	SOW	SOL	L	GF	GA	GD	Pts
6	CT	Inter Miami CF II	24	10	1	4	9	40	49	−9	36
7	NE	New England Revolution II	24	9	1	4	10	27	42	−15	33
8	CT	Chicago Fire FC II	24	8	2	3	11	41	44	−3	31
9	CT	Orlando City B	24	6	2	3	13	40	53	−13	25
10	CT	FC Cincinnati 2	24	4	2	1	17	27	65	−38	17

Source: MLSNP Eastern Conference
Rules for classification: 1) points; 2) total wins; 3) total goal differential; 4) total goals scored; 5) fewer disciplinary points; 6) away goal differential; 7) away goals scored; 8) home goals differential; 9) home goals scored; 10) coin toss (2 clubs tied) or drawing of lots (≥3 clubs tied)

Overall table

Pos	Team	Pld	W	SOW	SOL	L	GF	GA	GD	Pts
16	Chicago Fire FC II	24	8	2	3	11	41	44	−3	31
17	Colorado Rapids 2	24	7	4	2	11	33	56	−23	31
18	Orlando City B	24	6	2	3	13	40	53	−13	25
19	Real Monarchs	24	6	1	3	14	28	50	−22	23
20	FC Cincinnati 2	24	4	2	1	17	27	65	−38	17

Source: MLSNP
Rules for classification: 1) points; 2) total wins; 3) total goal differential; 4) total goals scored; 5) fewer disciplinary points; 6) away goal differential; 7) away goals scored; 8) home goals differential; 9) home goals scored; 10) coin toss (2 clubs tied) or drawing of lots (≥3 clubs tied)
