= Alex Freeman =

American soccer player (born 2004)

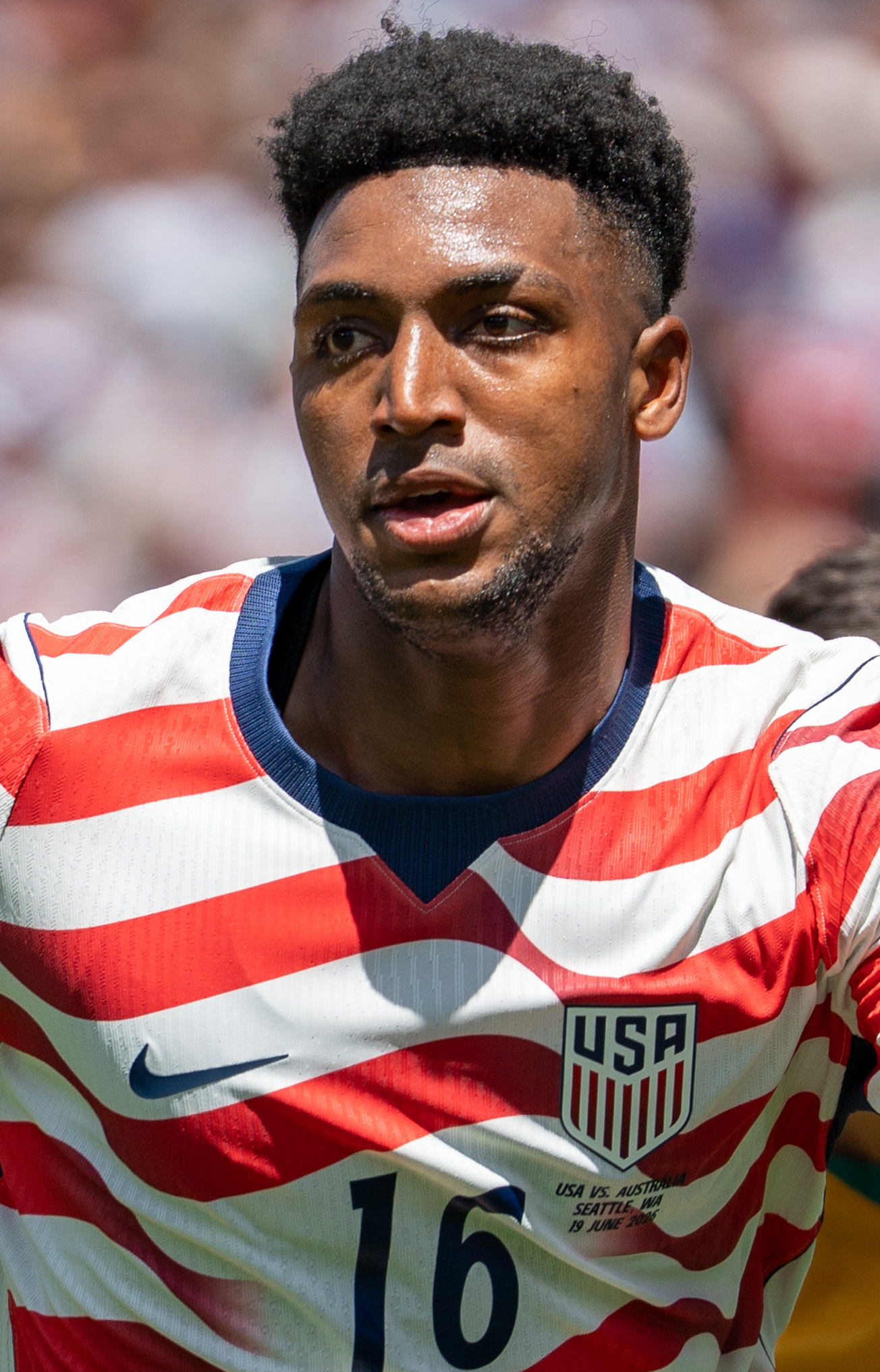
- Freeman with the United States in 2026

Personal information
- Full name: Alexander Michael Freeman
- Date of birth: August 9, 2004 (age 22)
- Place of birth: Baltimore, Maryland, U.S.
- Height: 6 ft 2 in (1.88 m)
- Positions: Right-back; right winger; center back

Team information
- Current team: Villarreal
- Number: 3

Youth career
- 2017–2019: Weston FC
- 2020–2021: Orlando City

Senior career*
Years	Team	Apps	(Gls)
2022–2026	Orlando City	32	(6)
2022–2024	→ Orlando City B (loan)	70	(12)
2026–	Villarreal	21	(1)

International career^{‡}
2022	United States U17	1	(0)
2022–2024	United States U19	6	(1)
2023	United States U23	5	(0)
2025–	United States	28	(3)
Medal record
Representing United States
Men's football
CONCACAF Gold Cup
Runner-up	2025 Canada–United States
- * Club domestic league appearances and goals as of 14:02, November 22, 2026 (UTC) ‡ National team caps and goals as of 01:58, November 18, 2026 (UTC)

Alexander Michael Freeman (born August 9, 2004) is an American professional soccer player who plays as a right-back, right winger, or center back for La Liga club Villarreal and the United States national team.

In 2022, Freeman signed with Major League Soccer club Orlando City, but spent the first three seasons of his professional career primarily playing for the reserve team, Orlando City B, in MLS Next Pro. In 2024, during his last season with Orlando City B, Freeman contributed the most assists and total goal contributions in the team. In 2025, Freeman broke into the first team of Orlando City and was named the MLS Young Player of the Year. In January 2026, he transferred to La Liga club Villarreal for an Orlando City team-record transfer fee for a homegrown player.

Freeman made his senior debut to the United States national team in June 2025 and represented the United States at the 2025 CONCACAF Gold Cup, during which he became the youngest player to make six consecutive appearances for the national team in the tournament as they finished runners-up behind Mexico.

== Youth career ==
Freeman was born in Baltimore, Maryland, but grew up in Fort Lauderdale, Florida. Freeman's first soccer coach was his stepfather, Jake Hinkle, who introduced him to the sport. Freeman attended American Heritage School in Plantation, Florida and played three seasons for Weston FC Academy before joining the Orlando City Academy in 2020. Freeman had tried out for Inter Miami's academy earlier, but he didn't make the team. However, Freeman's coach at Weston FC, Javier Carrillo, convinced him to try out for Orlando City's academy, despite the distance from his home. Freeman's mother, Rochelle, hesitated allowing Freeman to attend Orlando City's academy due to the distance and the ongoing COVID-19 pandemic, but allowed him to stay with another academy player's family. Freeman celebrated his 16th birthday without his family for the first time after making the move to Orlando and said that it took a toll on him, but that "it was something that needed to happen".

In 2021, he made 30 appearances for the under-17 team, scoring eight goals and providing 15 assists as Orlando City were crowned the inaugural MLS Next Cup U17 champions.

== Club career ==
=== Orlando City ===
==== 2022–2024: Time with the reserve team ====
On February 15, 2022, Orlando City signed Freeman to a four-year homegrown contract with an additional option year having spent preseason with the first-team, making him the club's 12th homegrown signing. Freeman made his first senior appearance on March 26, in the reserve team's first MLS Next Pro match when he started in a 2–0 victory over Chicago Fire II. Freeman would finish the 2022 campaign with Orlando City B with 19 appearances and three assists.

On March 31, 2023, Freeman scored his first professional goals when he netted a brace in a 2–1 victory over new expansion side Huntsville City in a match for Orlando City B. On April 29, 2023, Freeman made his debut for the club when he came on as a 93rd-minute substitute for Michael Halliday in a 2–0 victory over LA Galaxy. Freeman made his MLS Next Pro playoffs debut on October 1 when he came on as a 95th-minute substitute for Dominic Pereira in a 2–1 quarterfinals loss to Columbus Crew 2. Freeman would finish the 2023 season with Orlando City B with 25 appearances, four goals, and three assists.

On July 6, 2024, Freeman made his first goal contribution for the senior team after he came on as an 82nd-minute substitute for Kyle Smith against D.C. United. Freeman passed the ball to Ramiro Enrique from a redirected Nicolás Lodeiro free-kick, and Enrique scored to help the game end 5–0 in Orlando's favor. On September 8, Freeman made his first triple goal contribution when he scored two goals and assisted in another in a 4–1 victory at Crown Legacy FC. Later, on September 25, Freeman was named MLS Next Pro Player of the Matchweek for contributing two assists in a 3–0 win over Chicago Fire II two days earlier, helping to clinch the playoffs. Freeman's performances throughout the month of September also saw him voted MLS Next Pro Player of the Month for the first time. On October 20, Freeman started his first playoffs game in a 1–1 draw at Chicago Fire II, which then went into a penalty kick shootout. Freeman took Orlando's first penalty and successfully converted it, but Orlando would go on to lose the penalty kick shootout 5–4. Freeman finished the 2024 campaign with Orlando City B with 26 appearances, eight goals, and nine assists, the most assists and total goal contributions on the team.

==== 2025: Breakout season ====
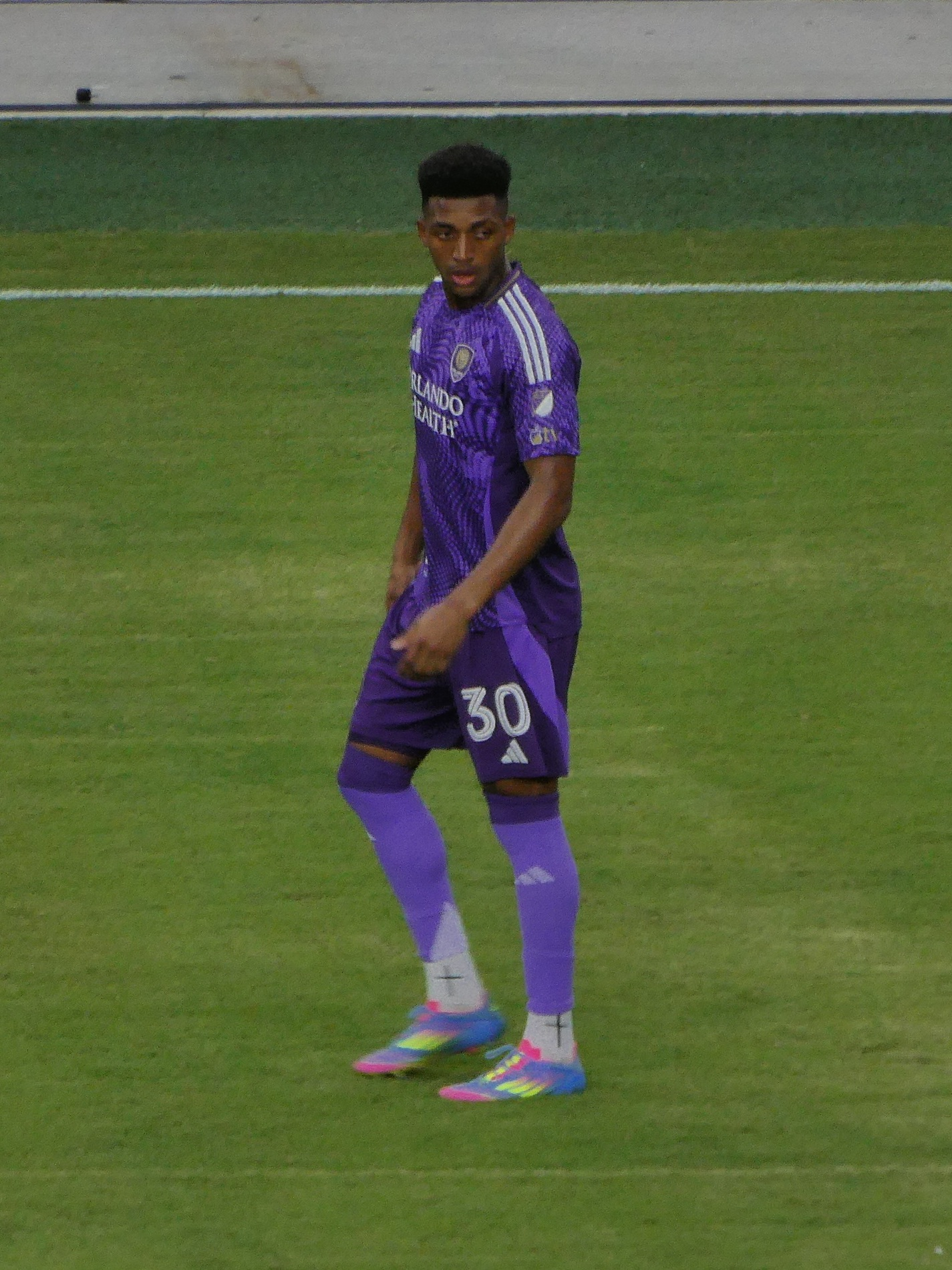
Freeman with Orlando City in 2025

On March 1, 2025, Freeman made his first career start for the club in a match against Toronto FC, and in the 35th-minute through an assist from Kyle Smith, he scored his first goal for the club. Freeman's goal helped the match end 4–2 in Orlando City's favor. For his performance, Freeman was named to the bench of the Team of the Matchday for the first time in his career two days later. On March 22, Freeman assisted in Luis Muriel's opening goal in a 4–1 win over D.C. United and later he scored the third goal of the match when he headed a free kick from Martín Ojeda. Freeman's performance would see him named to the starting Team of the Matchday for the first time in his career two days later.

On June 25, Major League Soccer announced Freeman had been voted in to represent the league in the 2025 MLS All-Star Game against the Liga MX All-Stars on July 23 at Q2 Stadium in Austin, Texas. Freeman's selection to the All-Star team made him the youngest player to ever be picked for the exhibition match. On July 15, Freeman was selected to represent the league in the MLS All-Star Touch Challenge during the MLS All-Star Skills Challenge a day before the game. Liga MX All-Stars defeated the MLS All-Stars in the All-Star Touch Challenge, but the MLS All-Stars won 4–2. Freeman also participated alongside YouTube and Twitch star IShowSpeed in the Shooting and Passing challenges. MLS All-Stars would also ultimately defeat the Liga MX All-Stars 3–1 in the All-Star Game with Freeman coming on as a 61st-minute substitute for Orlando City teammate Marco Pašalić.

On September 13, Freeman scored the equalizing goal in a 1–1 draw at D.C. United when he headed a rebounded shot from Pašalić into goal. After heading the ball, Freeman was struck in the head by a high boot from Lukas MacNaughton, who was sent off with a red card as a result. As a result, Freeman was named to the Team of the Matchday for the second time in his career. Freeman was again named to the Team of the Matchday for scoring another late equalizing goal, this time against FC Cincinnati on September 28, to secure a 1–1 draw. Freeman placed second in the 2025 22 Under 22 rankings with 1,220 points, only behind Seattle Sounders' Obed Vargas, who had 1,231 points. Freeman was named the MLS Young Player of the Year ahead of Vargas and Real Salt Lake's Diego Luna and became the first player in team history to be named to the MLS Best XI. In Freeman's breakout season, he registered six goals and six assists across all competitions for a total of 12 goal contributions. The club exercised Freeman's contract option after the conclusion of the season, which would see him contracted to the club through the 2026 season.

=== Villarreal ===
On January 29, 2026, Freeman moved to La Liga club Villarreal for a reported transfer fee of up to $7,000,000 on a six-year contract until June 2032. Freeman's move to Villarreal was described as risky by analysts, as Freeman was pining for a 2026 FIFA World Cup spot with the United States national team, and he would be moving from a settled starting position with Orlando City in Major League Soccer, to a new team and league. According to analysts, if he didn't secure regular playing time, his World Cup prospects might be put in jeopardy. Freeman was granted international clearance ahead of Villarreal's match against Osasuna two days after his signing, and featured on the bench as Villarreal drew 2–2. On February 9, Freeman made his debut as a 73rd-minute substitute for Santiago Mouriño in a 4–1 win over Espanyol. He made his first start for Villarreal in a 2–1 win over Celta Vigo on April 26, and the club praised him for winning all five duels he faced during the match.

In the following season, Freeman made his international debut in a UEFA Champions League match against Borussia Dortmund, coming on as a halftime substitute for Villarreal in a 3–2 loss on September 8. On October 10, Freeman started in a 1–0 loss to Real Madrid. Despite the loss, Freeman's performance during the match was lauded, with Marca's Matias Wodner writing that Freeman "dominated" Real Madrid during the match, and that he was "almost flawless in possession" and highlighting the number of defensive contributions Freeman made during the match. Freeman scored his first goal for Villarreal on October 24 against Valencia while playing in the right midfield position, helping his team come from behind to win 2–1. During that match, Freeman began in the left-back position, which Villarreal head coach Íñigo Pérez ascribed to his confidence in Freeman being able to handle the pace of Valencia winger David Otorbi. Later on in the match, Freeman switched back to the right-back position following substitutions, but then was moved up to right midfield after Pérez brought on an additional defender.

== International career ==
=== Youth ===
In March 2021, Freeman was called up to a 28-player United States youth regional identification camp.

On May 27, 2022, Freeman was called up by Marko Mitrović to the United States U19 squad alongside teammates Thomas Williams and Favian Loyola for friendly matches against the England U17 and Norway U19 the following month in Marbella, Spain. Freeman started against England as the United States won 2–1. Freeman started again as the United States faced Norway, defeating them 3–0. On September 16, Freeman was again selected by Mitrović, this time for the friendly Slovenia Nations Cup tournament against Malta, Croatia, and Scotland. On September 21, Freeman scored his first international goal, the final of a 5–0 rout of Malta. The United States would go on to defeat Croatia 4–3 and Scotland 2–1 to win the tournament.

On October 11, 2023, Freeman was selected by Michael Nsien alongside Williams to represent the United States U23 at the 2023 Pan American Games. The United States conceded a late goal after Freeman was substituted off as they lost their opening match 1–0 against Brazil. In the following match against Honduras, Freeman assisted Theodore Ku-DiPietro's winning goal to help end the game 2–1. Freeman started again the following match as the United States defeated Colombia 2–0 in the final group stage match in order to advance to the knockouts. However, the United States were eliminated by hosts, Chile, after conceding two unanswered goals.

=== Senior ===
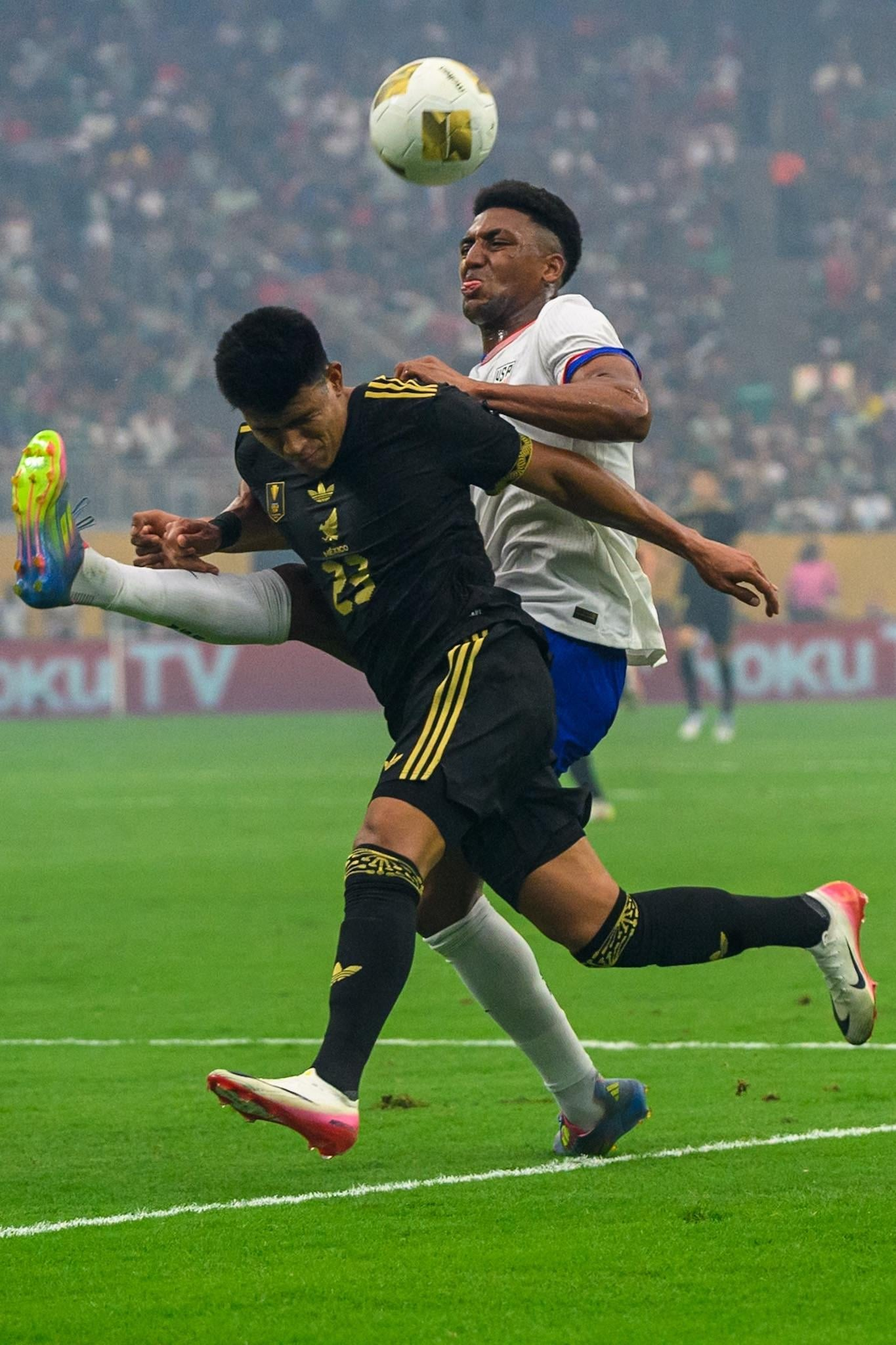
Freeman challenging Mexico's Jesús Gallardo during the 2025 CONCACAF Gold Cup final

On May 22, 2025, Freeman was called up by United States national team coach Mauricio Pochettino for training camp in Chicago ahead of matches against Turkey and Switzerland. Freeman later said that receiving the call-up was an "unexpected surprise", but that it was a result of "the hard work I've been putting out the past 3–4 years" and that his father, Antonio Freeman, told him to "keep [his] head down". On June 5, Freeman was selected for the 2025 CONCACAF Gold Cup, and two days later Freeman started against Turkey as they lost 2–1. Ten days later, Freeman made his competitive debut for the national team when he started and played the full match of the United States' 5–0 win over Trinidad and Tobago in the first match of the group stage. The United States advanced to the final of the tournament where they were defeated 2–1 by Mexico. Freeman's start against Mexico made him the youngest player to make six consecutive starts for the national team during the tournament.

Freeman received another call-up on August 26 for friendly matches against South Korea and Japan on September 6 and 9 respectively. Freeman was called up again for friendlies against Ecuador and Australia on October 10 and 14, respectively, and for the final call-up window for friendlies against Paraguay and Uruguay on November 15 and 18 respectively. In the match against Paraguay, which ultimately ended in a 2–1 victory, Freeman attempted to retrieve the ball after it went out of play for a United States throw-in and ended up in a scuffle with Paraguay's Gustavo Gómez in which Gómez appeared to put Freeman into a headlock. Their altercation resulted in a fight breaking out between the staff and players of the teams and a red card for Paraguay's Omar Alderete and yellow cards for Júnior Alonso and Freeman's teammate Cristian Roldan. On November 18, Freeman scored a brace against Uruguay, his first senior international goals of his career, and was named Man of the Match. The United States would ultimately win 5–1. Freeman was nominated by the United States Soccer Federation as a candidate for the USMNT Player of the Year alongside Chris Richards, Max Arfsten, Matt Freese, and Malik Tillman.

Freeman challenging Belgium's Jérémy Doku at the 2026 FIFA World Cup

On March 17, 2026, Freeman received his first call-up of the year for friendly matches at Mercedes-Benz Stadium in Atlanta against Belgium and Portugal on March 28 and 31 respectively. On May 26, Freeman's selection for the 2026 FIFA World Cup squad was officially revealed, and with his selection he became the first player to progress from Orlando City's academy and go on to play at the tournament. On June 12, ahead of the United States' opening game against Paraguay, Freeman's stepsister, Diamond, posted a reply to a TikTok video in which the creator urged her viewers to support the United States national team, which read: "My lil brother playing for the US so cheer for #16". The comment went viral and became a meme, and after TikTok users identified Freeman, he was given the nickname "Diamond's little brother" and his follower count on social media doubled. Diamond and one of her friends launched a website and a Linktree and, following Freeman's approval of designs, began selling meme-inspired merchandise. The same day the reply went viral, Freeman assisted Giovanni Reyna, helping to secure a 4–1 win against Paraguay. The result saw the United States score the most goals in a single match in their World Cup history. In the following World Cup match seven days later, Freeman scored his first competitive goal for the United States when he headed in a deflected shot on goal from Sergiño Dest to secure a 2–0 win over Australia. The celebration caused by Freeman's goal caused measurable seismic activity at Lumen Field in Seattle, tying the seventh-most intense vertical ground motion recorded at the stadium at 0.13 inches (3.3 mm) per second squared of vertical ground motion. The win secured United States' advancement to the knockout rounds. The United States were ultimately eliminated by Belgium in the round of 16.

Freeman was recalled to the national team by Pochettino on September 17 for friendlies against Peru, Chile, Mexico, and Canada later that month into October. On November 4, Freeman received his first competitive call-up by Pochettino since the World Cup, when he was recalled for CONCACAF Nations League quarter-final matches against Haiti later that month.

== Style of play ==
Freeman is both a playmaker and a goal-scoring threat from the fullback position who likes to provide a goal-scoring threat inside the penalty area. Freeman uses his speed and height to be both an effective attacker as well as an imposing defender. With the United States national team, Freeman has often been deployed as a third center back. Villarreal head coach Íñigo Pérez said that Freeman is capable of playing in both full-back positions, center back, wing back, and also further forward on the pitch.

== Personal life ==
Freeman is the son of former professional football player Antonio Freeman, who played as a wide receiver and won Super Bowl XXXI with the Green Bay Packers in 1997. In his youth, Freeman played both basketball and soccer alongside his father's sport and described having a "secret love for soccer". Freeman was initially hesitant to tell his father that he wasn't interested in pursuing American football, but that choosing soccer was a "clear choice" for him.

Freeman's mother, Rochelle, is a Liverpool fan and jokingly calls Freeman her "little Trent Alexander-Arnold". Freeman also has two younger brothers, Tyler and Josh, who both play soccer as well.

== Career statistics ==
=== Club ===
As of match played November 22, 2026

Appearances and goals by club, season and division
Club	Season	League			National cup (Note: Includes U.S. Open Cup and Copa del Rey)		Continental		Playoffs (Note: Includes MLS Cup playoffs and MLS Next Pro playoffs)		Other		Total	
Club	Season	Division	Apps	Goals	Apps	Goals	Apps	Goals	Apps	Goals	Apps	Goals	Apps	Goals
Orlando City B (loan)	2022	MLS Next Pro	19	0	—		—		—		—		19	0
Orlando City B (loan)	2023	MLS Next Pro	24	4	—		—		1	0	—		25	4
Orlando City B (loan)	2024	MLS Next Pro	27	8	—		—		1	0	—		28	8
Orlando City B (loan)	Total		70	12	—		—		2	0	—		72	12
Orlando City	2023	Major League Soccer	1	0	0	0	0	0	0	0	0	0	1	0
Orlando City	2024	Major League Soccer	2	0	—		0	0	0	0	1 (Note: Appearance(s) in Leagues Cup)	0	3	0
Orlando City	2025	Major League Soccer	29	6	2	0	—		1	0	6	0	38	6
Orlando City	Total		32	6	2	0	0	0	1	0	7	0	42	6
Villarreal	2025–26	La Liga	9	0	—		—		—		—		9	0
Villarreal	2026–27	La Liga	12	1	1	0	4 (Note: Appearances in UEFA Champions League)	0	—		—		17	1
Villarreal	Total		21	1	1	0	4	0	—		—		26	1
Career total			123	19	3	0	4	0	3	0	7	0	140	19

=== International ===
As of match played November 17, 2026

Appearances and goals by national team and year
National team	Year	Apps	Goals
United States	2025	13	2
United States	2026	15	1
Total		28	3

United States score listed first, score column indicates score after each Freeman goal.

List of international goals scored by Alex Freeman
No.	Date	Venue	Cap	Opponent	Score	Result	Competition
1	November 18, 2025	Raymond James Stadium, Tampa, United States	13	Uruguay	2–0	5–1	Friendly
2	November 18, 2025	Raymond James Stadium, Tampa, United States	13	Uruguay	3–0	5–1	Friendly
3	June 19, 2026	Lumen Field, Seattle, United States	19	Australia	2–0	2–0	2026 FIFA World Cup

== Honors ==
United States

- CONCACAF Gold Cup runner-up: 2025

Individual

- MLS Next Pro Player of the Month: September 2024
- MLS All-Star: 2025
- MLS Young Player of the Year: 2025
- MLS Best XI: 2025
