= 2022 MLS Next All-Star Game =

2022 MLS Next All-Star Game presented by Allstate
- Event: 2022 MLS Next Pro season, 2022–23 MLS Next season
MLS Next East	MLS Next West
(United States) (Canada)	(United States) (Canada)
2	1
- Date: August 10, 2022
- Venue: National Sports Center, Blaine, Minnesota

The 2022 MLS Next All-Star Game (known as the 2022 MLS Next All-Star Game presented by Allstate for sponsorship reasons) is the first edition of the MLS Next All-Star Game under its current format and the seventh edition of the game including the MLS Homegrown Game matches. The game will be played between the East and West All-Stars at the National Sports Center in Blaine, Minnesota as part of MLS All-Star Week, specifically leading up to the 2022 MLS All-Star Game.

This is the first homegrown All-Star game in MLS since 2019 due to the COVID-19 pandemic.

== Venue ==
Corresponding with the MLS All-Star Game being held at Allianz Field in St. Paul, Minnesota, the MLS Next All-Star Game will also be played in the Twin Cities.

== Squads ==
The rosters for the MLS Next All-Star Game was announced on June 27, 2022.

=== MLS Next East ===
Note: Flags indicate national team as defined under FIFA eligibility rules; some limited exceptions apply. Players may hold more than one non-FIFA nationality.

No.	Pos.	Nation	Player
1	GK	BLR	Stanislav Lapkes (Columbus Crew)
2	FW	USA	Ignacio Alem (D.C. United)
3	MF	BIH	Esmir Bajraktarević (New England Revolution)
4	DF	DOM	Israel Boatwright (Inter Miami CF)
5	DF	CAN	Thomas Bouffard (CF Montréal)
6	MF	USA	Brian Romero (Charlotte FC)
7	DF	USA	Noah Cobb (Atlanta United FC)
8	MF	USA	Benjamin Cremaschi (Inter Miami)
9	MF	USA	Giorgio DeLibera (Columbus Crew)
10	FW	POR	Bento Estrela (New York Red Bulls)
11	DF	USA	David Garcia (FC Cincinnati)

No.	Pos.	Nation	Player
12	MF	ESP	Alejandro Granados Torres (Orlando City SC)
13	DF	JAM	Malachi Grant (Atlanta United)
14	FW	BRB	Colin Griffith (PDA (Note: Committed to University of Maryland, College Park ahead of the 2022 NCAA Division I men's soccer season.))
15	DF	USA	Daniel Krueger (Philadelphia Union)
16	FW	CHI	Favian Loyola (Orlando City)
17	MF	USA	Jack Panayotou (New England Revolution)
18	GK	USA	Andrew Rick (Philadelphia Union)
19	DF	CAN	Adam Pearlman (Toronto FC)
20	DF	PUR	Diego Rossi (New York City FC (Note: Committed to University of Virginia ahead of the 2022 NCAA Division I men's soccer season.))
21	MF	JAM	Kobi Thomas (Inter Miami)
22	FW	USA	Marcos Zambrano (Philadelphia Union)

Coach: (Argentina) Javier Morales (Inter Miami CF) and (United States) Rob Becerra (New England Revolution)

=== MLS Next West ===
Note: Flags indicate national team as defined under FIFA eligibility rules; some limited exceptions apply. Players may hold more than one non-FIFA nationality.

No.	Pos.	Nation	Player
1		USA	Adam Beaudry (Colorado Rapids)
2		MEX	Alejandro Alcala (LA Galaxy)
3		USA	Christopher Aquino (Seattle Sounders FC)
4		USA	Edgar Bazan (Sporting Kansas City)
5		USA	Alejandro Carrillo (Nashville SC)
6		USA	Keith Chavarria (Colorado Rapids)
7		MDA	Mihail Gherasimencov (Vancouver Whitecaps FC)
8		USA	Andre Gitau (Houston Dynamo)
9		USA	Anthony Gonzalez (Austin FC)
10		USA	Stuart Hawkins (Seattle Sounders)
11		FIN	Gershon Henry (Real Salt Lake)

No.	Pos.	Nation	Player
12		USA	Bryce Jamison (Barça Residence Academy)
13		USA	Marcus Lee (California United Strikers)
14		USA	Carlos Leatherman (Minnesota United FC)
15		USA	Cruz Medina (San Jose Earthquakes)
16		JAM	Malachi Molina (FC Dallas)
17		USA	Bryan Moyado (Los Angeles FC)
18		MEX	Emmanuel Ochoa (San Jose Earthquakes)
19		USA	Drew Murray (San Jose Earthquakes)
20		USA	Kevin Rodriguez Andrade (San Francisco Glens)
21		USA	Ian Shaul (Portland Timbers)
22		JPN	Roka Tsunehara (De Anza Force)
23		USA	Fritz Volmar (St. Louis City SC)

Coaches: (Puerto Rico) Jeremy Hall (Minnesota United FC) and (United States) Antonio Medina (San Francisco Glens)

== Broadcasting ==
The match will be streamed live on MLSSoccer.com and on Twitch.

== See also ==
- 2022 MLS All-Star Game
