= 2023 Orlando City SC season =

Season of American association football team

Orlando City SC
2023 season
- Manager: Óscar Pareja
- Stadium: Exploria Stadium
- MLS: Conference: 2nd Overall: 2nd
- MLS Cup playoffs: Conference semi-finals
- U.S. Open Cup: Round of 32
- CONCACAF Champions League: Round of 16
- Leagues Cup: Round of 32
- Top goalscorer: League: Facundo Torres (14); All: Duncan McGuire (15)
- Highest home attendance: 25,527 (September 24 vs. Inter Miami CF)
- Lowest home attendance: League: 17,012 (May 17 vs. New York City FC); All: 14,005 (July 21 vs. Houston Dynamo, Leagues Cup)
- Average home league attendance: 20,590
- Biggest win: ORL 4–0 TOR (Jul. 4)
- Biggest defeat: RSL 4–0 ORL (Jul. 8)
| Home colors | Away colors |

The 2023 Orlando City SC season was the club's 13th season of existence in Orlando and ninth season as a Major League Soccer franchise, the top-flight league in the United States soccer league system. Orlando also played in three other competitions: the U.S. Open Cup as defending champions, Leagues Cup, as well as the CONCACAF Champions League for the first time.

== Season review ==
=== Pre-season ===
Orlando made its first offseason move on November 9, trading $300,000 in general allocation money plus potential future add-ons to Toronto FC in exchange for Luca Petrasso. A day later it was announced Júnior Urso and the club had agreed to mutually terminate his contract so he could return to Brazil due to personal circumstances. At the time of his departure, he had made the eighth-most appearances for the club. As part of the end of season roster decisions, Orlando City announced the departures of Tesho Akindele, who ranked second all-time in appearances for the club in all competitions with 121 behind only Chris Mueller and sixth for goals with 21 at the time of his departure, as well as injury-plagued Alexandre Pato and former draft pick Joey DeZart. Wilder Cartagena had his loan extension option exercised. Club captain Mauricio Pereyra was signed to a new two-year contract using allocation money meaning he would no longer occupy a Designated Player slot. 11-year MLS veteran Felipe Martins was signed as a free agent and Favian Loyola became the third offseason signing when he was signed to a homegrown contract.

With the addition of St. Louis City SC in 2023, MLS held an Expansion Draft on November 11, 2022. St. Louis selected Nicholas Gioacchini who had joined Orlando in July 2022 and made seven appearances in all competitions for the team.

In December, Orlando confirmed further player departures: João Moutinho sealed a move to Italian side Spezia following the expiration of his contract, while the club traded away both Andrés Perea to Philadelphia Union for allocation money and Ruan to D.C. United in exchange for the #2 overall pick in the 2023 MLS SuperDraft, later used to select Generation Adidas signee Shak Mohammed. He was one of four players selected by Orlando. Homegrown player Benji Michel departed for Portugal as a free agent, joining Arouca, while Jake Mulraney was sold, returning home to Ireland to sign with St Patrick's Athletic. With a flurry of key departures, Orlando undertook significant recruitment in January, signing defender Rafael Santos from Cruzeiro, new Designated Player Martín Ojeda and Under-22 initiative player Ramiro Enrique both out of Argentina, as well as Icelandic international midfielder Dagur Dan Þórhallsson.

Also during the offseason, Ercan Kara, Facundo Torres and Gastón González all received green cards meaning they no longer occupied international roster spots.

=== February ===
Orlando City opened the season on February 25 at home to New York Red Bulls. Having weathered heavy New York pressure in the first half, the Lions opened the scoring with their first shot of the match in the 56th minute courtesy of a Facundo Torres penalty after Sean Nealis was ajudged to have handled the ball. Orlando held on for the 1–0 victory, preserving their opening day unbeaten streak since joining MLS in 2015 (3W 6D 0L).

=== March ===
The team remained at home for week two, hosting FC Cincinnati. Pareja made five changes to his starting lineup including handing debuts to Gastón González and Abdi Salim but the offensive struggles continued as the Lions registered only one shot on goal in a 0–0 draw. Three days later, on March 7, Orlando debuted in the CONCACAF Champions League away to 2020 winners Tigres UANL. The Lions took a goalless draw from the round of 16 first leg, largely thanks to an eight-save performance from Pedro Gallese who kept his third shutout in as many games to start the season. The team finally conceded for the first time on March 11 as part of a 1–1 draw with D.C. United. Rookie Duncan McGuire debuted from the start and, after a goalless first half, gave the Lions the lead in the 53rd minute when he guided a Dagur Dan Þórhallsson header home from two yards. D.C. were awarded a penalty five minutes later for a supposed handball from Wilder Cartagena before a VAR review overturned the decision after judging it hit his body instead. D.C. eventually found an equalizer through Chris Durkin who cut back and struck a fierce left-footed shot across goal from the top of the box in the 80th minute. Orlando remained unbeaten in all competitions to begin the year but extended the winless streak to three.

Four days later, Orlando returned to Champions League action for the second leg against Tigres. In a game of two halves, Tigres went in to the break with a one-goal lead after Sebastián Córdova managed to find himself with enough time and space inside the penalty area to bring down a looping cross and slide the ball under Gallese. However, Orlando were the better side in the second half as they pushed forward for an equaliser. It eventually came in the 89th minute as substitute Ercan Kara scored his first goal of the season, an acrobatic bicycle kick, but it was a case of too little too late as Orlando were eliminated on the away goals rule as the game finished 1–1 both on the night and on aggregate. Head coach Óscar Pareja received a red card after the final whistle for confronting the referee about the lack of time added on as Tigres tried to waste time to see out the game: "We scored in minute 89 and between 89 and 96:45 it was four minutes 50 seconds that they did not play the game."

Orlando's undefeated start to the season ended at home to bottom of the table Charlotte FC on March 18. Having controlled the opening exchanges and had an early goal ruled out for offside, Orlando were caught out when Charlotte capitalized on the Lions' high line as Enzo Copetti found himself one on one with Gallese from a long ball and was able to slot home before the visitors double the lead through Kerwin Vargas' speculative shot from the edge of the box. Orlando responded after half time with a goal in the 57th minute as Martín Ojeda was first to a loose ball in the penalty area to score his first for the club, and spent much of the second half threatening to equalize, seeing the ball in the back of the net again only for the goal to be ruled offside for a second time. Despite attempting 19 shots to Charlotte's eight, the Lions lost 2–1, giving Charlotte their first points of the season.

== Roster ==
Last updated on September 2, 2023

| No. | Nationality | Name | Position(s) | Date of birth (age) | Previous club | Notes |
Goalkeepers
| 1 | (Peru) | Pedro Gallese | GK | February 23, 1990 (aged 33) | (Mexico) Veracruz | INT |
| 31 | (United States) | Mason Stajduhar | GK | December 2, 1997 (aged 25) | (United States) Orlando City U-23 | HGP |
| 50 | (Venezuela) | Javier Otero | GK | November 18, 2002 (aged 20) | (United States) Orlando City B | HGP |
| 99 | (United States) | Adam Grinwis | GK | April 21, 1992 (aged 30) | (United States) Sacramento Republic | – |
Defenders
| 3 | (Brazil) | Rafael Santos | LB | February 5, 1998 (aged 25) | (Brazil) Cruzeiro | INT |
| 6 | (Sweden) | Robin Jansson | CB | November 15, 1991 (aged 31) | (Sweden) AIK | – |
| 15 | (Argentina) | Rodrigo Schlegel | CB | April 3, 1997 (aged 25) | (Argentina) Racing Club | INT |
| 20 | (Canada) | Luca Petrasso | LB | June 16, 2000 (aged 22) | (Canada) Toronto FC | HGP |
| 24 | (United States) | Kyle Smith | RB | January 9, 1992 (aged 31) | (United States) Louisville City | – |
| 25 | (Brazil) | Antônio Carlos | CB | March 7, 1993 (aged 29) | (Brazil) Palmeiras | INT |
| 26 | (United States) | Michael Halliday | RB | January 22, 2003 (aged 20) | (United States) Orlando City B | HGP |
| 28 | (Somalia) | Abdi Salim | CB | April 1, 2001 (aged 21) | (United States) Syracuse Orange | – |
| 30 | (United States) | Alex Freeman | RB | August 9, 2004 (aged 18) | (United States) Orlando City Academy | HGP |
| 68 | (United States) | Thomas Williams | CB | August 15, 2004 (aged 18) | (United States) Orlando City B | HGP |
Midfielders
| 5 | (Uruguay) | César Araújo | CM | April 2, 2001 (aged 21) | (Uruguay) Montevideo Wanderers | U22, INT |
| 8 | (Brazil) | Felipe Martins | CM | September 30, 1990 (aged 32) | (United States) Austin FC | – |
| 10 | (Uruguay) | Mauricio Pereyra | AM | March 15, 1990 (aged 32) | (Russia) FC Krasnodar | INT |
| 16 | (Peru) | Wilder Cartagena | DM | September 23, 1994 (aged 28) | (United Arab Emirates) Al-Ittihad Kalba | INT, Loan in |
| 21 | (Brazil) | Júnior Urso | CM | March 10, 1989 (aged 33) | (Brazil) Corinthians | INT |
| 23 | (Iceland) | Dagur Dan Þórhallsson | CM | May 2, 2000 (aged 22) | (Iceland) Breiðablik | INT |
| 95 | (United States) | Favian Loyola | AM | May 18, 2005 (aged 17) | (United States) Orlando City B | HGP |
Forwards
| 7 | (Argentina) | Ramiro Enrique | CF | May 4, 2001 (aged 21) | (Argentina) Banfield | U22, INT |
| 11 | (Argentina) | Martín Ojeda | LW | November 27, 1998 (aged 24) | (Argentina) Godoy Cruz | DP, INT |
| 13 | (United States) | Duncan McGuire | ST | February 5, 2001 (aged 22) | (United States) Creighton Bluejays | – |
| 14 | (Ghana) | Shak Mohammed | ST | August 27, 2003 (aged 19) | (United States) Duke Blue Devils | GA |
| 17 | (Uruguay) | Facundo Torres | LW | April 13, 2000 (aged 22) | (Uruguay) Peñarol | DP |
| 22 | (Argentina) | Gastón González | LW | June 27, 2001 (aged 21) | (Argentina) Unión Santa Fe | – |
| 27 | (United States) | Jack Lynn | CF | January 12, 2000 (aged 23) | (United States) Notre Dame Fighting Irish | – |
| 32 | (Puerto Rico) | Wilfredo Rivera | LW | October 14, 2003 (aged 19) | (United States) Orlando City B | HGP |
| 77 | (Colombia) | Iván Angulo | LW | March 22, 1999 (aged 23) | (Brazil) Palmeiras | INT, Loan in |

== Staff ==
Executive
| Majority owner and chairman | (United States) Mark Wilf |
| Majority owner and vice-chair | (United States) Zygi Wilf |
| Majority owner and vice-chair | (United States) Leonard Wilf |
| President of business operations | (United States) Jarrod Dillon |
| General manager | (Brazil) Luiz Muzzi |
| Technical director | (Brazil) Ricardo Moreira |
Coaching staff
| Head coach | (Colombia) Óscar Pareja |
| Assistant coach | (Argentina) Josema Bazán |
| Assistant coach | (Mexico) Diego Torres Ortiz |
| Strength and conditioning coach | (Argentina) Fabian Bazán |
| Goalkeeping coach | (Venezuela) César Baena |

== Competitions ==
=== Friendlies ===
Orlando City opened preseason camp on January 9. Six friendly matches were scheduled with all but one to be played behind closed doors.

| February 1 Preseason | Orlando City | 2–0 | Minnesota United FC | Kissimmee, Florida |
| 4:00 pm | Kara 5'; Thórhallsson 90' | Report | | Stadium: Osceola County Stadium |
Note: Closed-door scrimmage

| February 4 Preseason | Orlando City | 3–1 | FIU Panthers | Kissimmee, Florida |
| 7:00 pm | McGuire 47'; Ojeda 50', 59' | Report | Unknown | Stadium: Osceola County Stadium |
Note: Closed-door scrimmage

| February 7 Preseason | Orlando City | Canceled | Nashville SC | Tampa, Florida |
Note: Closed-door scrimmage. Canceled due to venue availability issues.

| February 11 Preseason | Orlando City | 2–2 | Colorado Rapids | Orlando, Florida |
| 7:30 pm | González 70'; Lynn 79' | Report | Bassett 58'; Rubio 68' (pen.) | Stadium: Exploria Stadium |
Note: Closed-door scrimmage

| February 15 Preseason | Orlando City | 5–0 | Stetson Hatters | Kissimmee, Florida |
| 9:00 am | Rivera; Mohammed; Vazquez | Report | | Stadium: Osceola County Stadium |
Note: Closed-door scrimmage

| February 18 Preseason | Orlando City | 1–2 | New England Revolution | Orlando, Florida |
| 7:30 pm | Angulo 17' | Report | Vrioni 71', 82' | Stadium: Exploria Stadium |

=== Major League Soccer ===
Outside of the club, St. Louis City joined the league as an expansion franchise, bringing the total number of MLS clubs to 29.

Results summary

| Overall | | | | | | | | Home | | | | | | Away | | | | | |
| Pld | W | D | L | GF | GA | GD | Pts | W | D | L | GF | GA | GD | W | D | L | GF | GA | GD |
|---|---|---|---|---|---|---|---|---|---|---|---|---|---|---|---|---|---|---|---|
| 34 | 18 | 9 | 7 | 54 | 39 | +15 | 63 | 9 | 5 | 3 | 31 | 19 | +12 | 9 | 4 | 4 | 23 | 20 | +3 |

Last updated: October 21.
Source: Match reports

| Round | 1 | 2 | 3 | 4 | 5 | 6 | 7 | 8 | 9 | 10 | 11 | 12 | 13 | 14 | 15 | 16 | 17 | 18 | 19 | 20 | 21 | 22 | 23 | 24 | 25 | 26 | 27 | 28 | 29 | 30 | 31 | 32 | 33 | 34 |
|---|---|---|---|---|---|---|---|---|---|---|---|---|---|---|---|---|---|---|---|---|---|---|---|---|---|---|---|---|---|---|---|---|---|---|
| Stadium | H | H | A | H | A | H | A | H | H | A | A | H | A | H | A | H | A | H | A | H | H | A | A | A | H | A | A | H | A | H | H | A | H | A |
| Result | W | D | D | L | W | L | W | L | W | L | D | D | W | D | W | W | L | D | D | W | W | L | W | W | W | D | W | W | L | D | W | W | W | W |
| Position (Note: ORL's position at the end of the matchweek, not their match.) | 8 | 6 | 7 | 9 | 4 | 7 | 7 | 9 | 8 | 9 | 11 | 10 | 7 | 7 | 8 | 7 | 7 | 7 | 7 | 7 | 6 | 7 | 5 | 4 | 4 | 3 | 3 | 2 | 2 | 2 | 2 | 2 | 2 | 2 |

Updated to match(es) played on October 21. Source: Match reports
A = Away; H = Home; W = Win; D = Draw; L = Loss

Results

| February 25 1 | Orlando City | 1–0 | New York Red Bulls | Orlando, Florida |
| 7:30 pm | Jansson (yellow card) 23'; Torres 56' (pen.); Angulo (yellow card) 76'; Pereyra (yellow card) 76'; Araújo (yellow card) 82' | Report | Reyes (yellow card) 6'; Barlow (yellow card) 49'; Amaya (yellow card) 72' | Stadium: Exploria Stadium; Attendance: 24,088; Referee: Guido Gonzales Jr. |

| March 4 2 | Orlando City | 0–0 | FC Cincinnati | Orlando, Florida |
| 7:30 pm | Cartagena (yellow card) 27' | Report | Santos (yellow card) 90+1' | Stadium: Exploria Stadium; Attendance: 18,062; Referee: Ismail Elfath |

| March 11 3 | D.C. United | 1–1 | Orlando City | Washington, D.C. |
| 7:30 pm | Asad (yellow card) 65'; Durkin 80'; Ruan (yellow card) 87' | Report | McGuire 53'; Smith (yellow card) 77' | Stadium: Audi Field; Attendance: 15,994; Referee: Jon Freemon |

| March 18 4 | Orlando City | 1–2 | Charlotte FC | Orlando, Florida |
| 7:30 pm | Ojeda 57' | Report | Copetti 26', (yellow card) 80'; Afful (yellow card) 28'; Vargas 37'; Marks (yellow card) 69'; Bronico (yellow card) 76'; Jóźwiak (yellow card) 77' | Stadium: Exploria Stadium; Attendance: 18,123; Referee: Armando Villarreal |

| March 25 5 | Philadelphia Union | 1–2 | Orlando City | Chester, Pennsylvania |
| 7:30 pm | Perea 17'; J. Torres (yellow card) 88'; Wagner (yellow card) 88' | Report | Ojeda 2'; Angulo 9', (yellow card) 36'; Felipe (yellow card) 20' | Stadium: Subaru Park; Attendance: 18,725; Referee: Allen Chapman |

| April 1 6 | Orlando City | 0–2 | Nashville SC | Orlando, Florida |
| 7:30 pm | Schlegel (yellow card) 48'; Smith (yellow card) 64' | Report | Haakenson (yellow card) 26'; Godoy (yellow card) 27'; Picault 28', (yellow card) 64'; Mukhtar 74' | Stadium: Exploria Stadium; Attendance: 20,115; Referee: Chris Penso |

| April 15 7 | Minnesota United FC | 1–2 | Orlando City | Saint Paul, Minnesota |
| 8:30 pm | Hlongwane 58'; Arriaga (yellow card) 90+3' | Report | Angulo 66'; McGuire 88' | Stadium: Allianz Field; Attendance: 19,685; Referee: Pierre-Luc Lauziere |

| April 22 8 | Orlando City | 1–3 | D.C. United | Orlando, Florida |
| 7:30 pm | McGuire 23'; Angulo (yellow card) 27'; Carlos (yellow card) 56'; Araujo (yellow card) 90+1' | Report | Ruan (yellow card) 11'; Fountas 15'; Klich (yellow card) 42'; Pines 52', (yellow card) 85'; Benteke 62'; Canouse (yellow card) 74' | Stadium: Exploria Stadium; Attendance: 19,514; Referee: Lukasz Szpala |

| April 29 9 | Orlando City | 2–0 | LA Galaxy | Orlando, Florida |
| 7:30 pm | Kara 38'; Torres 57' | Report | Aude (yellow card) 37'; Brugman (yellow card) 59'; Zavaleta (yellow card) 73' | Stadium: Exploria Stadium; Attendance: 22,519; Referee: Jon Freemon |

| May 6 10 | CF Montréal | 2–0 | Orlando City | Montreal, Quebec, Canada |
| 7:30 pm | Jansson 62' (o.g.); Quioto 66'; Camacho (yellow card) 79'; Waterman (yellow card) 83' | Report | Smith (yellow card) 23'; Halliday (yellow card) 41'; Araujo (yellow card) 74'; Enrique (yellow card) 76'; Felipe (yellow card) 89' | Stadium: Saputo Stadium; Attendance: 16,112; Referee: Marcos de Oliveira |

| May 13 11 | Columbus Crew | 2–2 | Orlando City | Columbus, Ohio |
| 7:30 pm | Moreira (yellow card) 28'; Quinton (yellow card) 35'; Nagbe 39', (yellow card) 71'; Russell-Rowe 45+2'; Vallecilla (yellow card) 52' | Report | Carlos (yellow card) 14'; Kara 49'; Cartagena (yellow card) 73'; McGuire 90+2' | Stadium: Lower.com Field; Attendance: 20,488; Referee: Drew Fischer |

| May 17 12 | Orlando City | 1–1 | New York City FC | Orlando, Florida |
| 7:30 pm | Kara 7'; Smith (yellow card) 33'; McGuire (yellow card) 67' | Report | Chanot (yellow card) 71'; Segal 89' | Stadium: Exploria Stadium; Attendance: 17,012; Referee: Sergii Boiko |

| May 20 13 | Inter Miami CF | 1–3 | Orlando City | Fort Lauderdale, Florida |
| 7:30 pm | Campana (yellow card) 16', (goal) 57'; Cremaschi (yellow card) 75'; Fray (yellow card) 89'; McVey (yellow card) 90+1' | Report | Kara 19'; Carlos (yellow card) 23'; Cartagena (yellow card) 36'; Angulo (yellow card) 41'; Ojeda 68'; Santos 86' | Stadium: DRV PNK Stadium; Attendance: 17,643; Referee: Ramy Touchan |

| May 27 14 | Orlando City | 1–1 | Atlanta United FC | Orlando, Florida |
| 7:30 pm | Carlos (yellow card) 25'; Smith 30' | Report | Hernández (yellow card) 66'; Wolff 86'; Rossetto (yellow card) 90+4' | Stadium: Exploria Stadium; Attendance: 20,127; Referee: Allen Chapman |

| June 3 15 | New York Red Bulls | 0–3 | Orlando City | Harrison, New Jersey |
| 7:30 pm | Yearwood (yellow card) 30'; Reyes (yellow card) 45+3' (yellow-red card) 47'; Nealis (yellow card) 50' | Report | Angulo 18'; Jansson (yellow card) 45+6'; Torres 51' (pen.), 72'; Santos (yellow card) 90'; Felipe (yellow card) 90+6' | Stadium: Red Bull Arena; Attendance: 19,871; Referee: Victor Rivas |

| June 10 16 | Orlando City | 2–0 | Colorado Rapids | Orlando, Florida |
| 7:30 pm | Carlos (yellow card) 24'; Smith (yellow card) 52'; Torres 56'; Enrique 83' | Report | Abubakar (yellow card) 6' (yellow-red card) 75'; Galván (red card) 39'; Yapi (yellow card) 89' | Stadium: Exploria Stadium; Attendance: 18,711; Referee: Rosendo Mendoza |

| June 17 17 | New England Revolution | 3–1 | Orlando City | Foxborough, Massachusetts |
| 7:30 pm | Boateng 51'; Bou 69'; Buck (yellow card) 84'; Gil 85'; Edwards Jr. (yellow card) 90+3' | Report | Araújo (yellow card) 3'; Halliday (yellow card) 22'; McGuire 80' | Stadium: Gillette Stadium; Attendance: 21,492; Referee: Fotis Bazakos |

| June 21 18 | Orlando City | 2–2 | Philadelphia Union | Orlando, Florida |
| 7:30 pm | McGuire 13'; Ojeda 54'; Stajduhar (yellow card) 61'; Enrique (yellow card) 82'; Kara (yellow card) 88' | Report | Mbaizo (yellow card) 28'; Flach (yellow card) 38'; McGlynn 60'; Carranza (yellow card) 62'; Wagner (yellow card) 83'; Martínez 90' | Stadium: Exploria Stadium; Attendance: 17,516; Referee: Alex Chilowicz |

| June 24 19 | Seattle Sounders FC | 0–0 | Orlando City | Seattle, Washington |
| 10:30 pm | Ragen (yellow card) 20'; Baker (yellow card) 61'; Lodeiro (yellow card) 90+2' | Report | Torres (yellow card) 41'; Araújo (yellow card) 59' | Stadium: Lumen Field; Attendance: 30,693; Referee: Pierre-Luc Lauziere |

| July 1 20 | Orlando City | 3–1 | Chicago Fire FC | Orlando, Florida |
| 7:30 pm | Jansson (yellow card) 35'; Torres 38', 55' (pen.); Enrique 75'; Thórhallsson (yellow card) 90+9' | Report | Souquet (yellow card) 20' (yellow-red card) 84'; Shaqiri 66' (pen.); Navarro (yellow card) 72' | Stadium: Exploria Stadium; Attendance: 22,070; Referee: Nima Saghafi |

| July 4 21 | Orlando City | 4–0 | Toronto FC | Orlando, Florida |
| 7:30 pm | Araújo 16'; McGuire 22'; Gallese (yellow card) 62'; Thórhallsson 77'; Kara 84' | Report | Coello (yellow card) 45+1'; Bernardeschi (yellow card) 47' (yellow-red card) 62'; Petretta (yellow card) 80' | Stadium: Exploria Stadium; Attendance: 17,604; Referee: Guido Gonzales Jr. |

| July 8 22 | Real Salt Lake | 4–0 | Orlando City | Sandy, Utah |
| 9:30 pm | Arango 23'; Glad 41'; Luna (yellow card) 53'; Ojeda (yellow card) 62'; Vera (yellow card) 70'; Savarino 78'; Julio 88' | Report | Cartagena (yellow card) 38' | Stadium: America First Field; Attendance: 20,800; Referee: Mark Allatin |

| July 15 23 | Atlanta United FC | 1–2 | Orlando City | Atlanta, Georgia |
| 7:30 pm | Wiley 22'; Alonso (yellow card) 59'; Giakoumakis (yellow card) 90+1' | Report | Carlos 25', (yellow card) 90+6'; Cartagena (yellow card) 45+2'; Jansson (yellow card) 45+3'; McGuire 60', (yellow card) 65'; Angulo (yellow card) 87'; Gallese (yellow card) 90+8' | Stadium: Mercedes-Benz Stadium; Attendance: 43,576; Referee: Víctor Rivas |

| August 20 24 | Chicago Fire FC | 1–3 | Orlando City | Chicago, Illinois |
| 8:30 pm | Pineda 47', (yellow card) 76'; Giménez (yellow card) 59'; Doumbia (yellow card) 71'; Shaqiri (yellow card) 74' | Report | Schlegel (yellow card) 34'; Cartagena 50'; Angulo 54'; Torres (yellow card) 55', (goal) 68' (pen.) | Stadium: Soldier Field; Attendance: 18,103; Referee: Lukasz Szpala |

| August 26 25 | Orlando City | 2–1 | St. Louis City SC | Orlando, Florida |
| 7:30 pm | Torres 48', 90+1' (pen.); Pereyra (yellow card) 56'; Cartagena (yellow card) 73' | Report | Jackson (yellow card) 50'; Adeniran (yellow card) 50'; Alm 79'; Nerwinski (yellow card) 87' (red card) 90+10'; Markanich (yellow card) 90' | Stadium: Exploria Stadium; Attendance: 22,156; Referee: Joseph Dickerson |

| August 30 26 | Charlotte FC | 1–1 | Orlando City | Charlotte, North Carolina |
| 7:30 pm | Jones (yellow card) 72'; Copetti 81' (pen.), (yellow card) 90+5' | Report | Martins (yellow card) 68'; Araújo (yellow card) 75'; Ojeda 88' | Stadium: Bank of America Stadium; Attendance: 27,236; Referee: Rosendo Mendoza |

| September 2 27 | FC Cincinnati | 0–1 | Orlando City | Cincinnati, Ohio |
| 7:30 pm | Acosta (yellow card) 44'; Boupendza (yellow card) 90+4' | Report | Santos (yellow card) 13'; Thórhallsson (yellow card) 41'; Torres 44'; Araújo (yellow card) 55'; Urso (yellow card) 90+5'; Cartagena (red card) 90+5'; Gallese (yellow card) 90+11' | Stadium: TQL Stadium; Attendance: 25,513; Referee: Drew Fischer |

| September 16 28 | Orlando City | 4–3 | Columbus Crew | Orlando, Florida |
| 7:30 pm | Ojeda 48'; Torres 73'; Enrique 86', 90+7', (yellow card) 90+8' | Report | Gressel 16'; Rossi 56'; Hernández 68'; Morris (yellow card) 82' | Stadium: Exploria Stadium; Attendance: 22,802; Referee: Rubiel Vazquez |

| September 20 29 | New York City FC | 2–0 | Orlando City | New York, New York |
| 7:30 pm | Bakrar 37'; Ledezma (yellow card) 41'; Talles Magno 68' | Report | Pereyra (yellow card) 45+1'; Cartagena (yellow card) 54' | Stadium: Yankee Stadium; Attendance: 15,238; Referee: Ismail Elfath |

| September 24 30 | Orlando City | 1–1 | Inter Miami CF | Orlando, Florida |
| 7:30 pm | Schlegel (yellow card) 60'; McGuire 66'; Jansson (yellow card) 90+1' | Report | Avilés (yellow card) 23'; Cremaschi (yellow card) 31'; Ruiz 52', (yellow card) 54'; Yedlin (yellow card) 55'; Arroyo (yellow card) 78' | Stadium: Exploria Stadium; Attendance: 25,527; Referee: Armando Villarreal |

| September 30 31 | Orlando City | 3–0 | CF Montréal | Orlando, Florida |
| 7:30 pm | Sirois 19' (o.g.); Thórhallsson 50'; Torres 54'; Enrique (yellow card) 68'; Araújo (yellow card) 75' | Report | Campbell (yellow card) 24'; Corbo (yellow card) 60'; Saliba (yellow card) 69' | Stadium: Exploria Stadium; Attendance: 19,637; Referee: Sergii Boiko |

| October 4 32 | Nashville SC | 0–1 | Orlando City | Nashville, Tennessee |
| 7:30 pm | Anunga (yellow card) 34'; Mukhtar (yellow card) 38'; Surridge (yellow card) 41'; Lovitz (yellow card) 79' (yellow-red card) 90+11'; Bunbury (yellow card) 90+12' | Report | McGuire 44'; Cartagena (yellow card) 46' | Stadium: Geodis Park; Attendance: 25,273; Referee: Rosendo Mendoza |

| October 7 33 | Orlando City | 3–2 | New England Revolution | Orlando, Florida |
| 7:30 pm | McGuire 31'; Torres 37'; Angulo 45' | Report | C. Gil 42', 90+3'; McNamara (yellow card) 84' | Stadium: Exploria Stadium; Attendance: 24,440; Referee: Allen Chapman |

| October 21 34 | Toronto FC | 0–2 | Orlando City | Toronto, Ontario, Canada |
| 6:00 pm | | Report | McGuire 63', 74' | Stadium: BMO Field; Attendance: 27,556; Referee: Mathieu Souaré |

==== Standings ====
Eastern Conference table

MLS Eastern Conference table (2023)
| Pos | Team | Pld | W | L | T | GF | GA | GD | Pts | Qualification |
|---|---|---|---|---|---|---|---|---|---|---|
| 1 | FC Cincinnati | 34 | 20 | 5 | 9 | 57 | 39 | +18 | 69 | Qualification for round one and the CONCACAF Champions Cup round one |
| 2 | Orlando City SC | 34 | 18 | 7 | 9 | 55 | 39 | +16 | 63 | Qualification for round one |
| 3 | Columbus Crew | 34 | 16 | 9 | 9 | 67 | 46 | +21 | 57 | Qualification for round one |
| 4 | Philadelphia Union | 34 | 15 | 9 | 10 | 57 | 41 | +16 | 55 | Qualification for round one |
| 5 | New England Revolution | 34 | 15 | 9 | 10 | 58 | 46 | +12 | 55 | Qualification for round one |

Source: MLS
Rules for classification: 1) points; 2) total wins; 3) total goal differential; 4) total goals scored; 5) fewer disciplinary points; 6) away goal differential; 7) away goals scored; 8) home goals differential; 9) home goals scored; 10) coin toss (2 clubs tied) or drawing of lots (≥3 clubs tied)

Overall table

Overall MLS standings table
| Pos | Team | Pld | W | L | T | GF | GA | GD | Pts | Qualification |
|---|---|---|---|---|---|---|---|---|---|---|
| 1 | FC Cincinnati (S) | 34 | 20 | 5 | 9 | 57 | 39 | +18 | 69 | Qualification for the CONCACAF Champions Cup round one (Note: As 2023 MLS Supporters' Shield champions) |
| 2 | Orlando City SC | 34 | 18 | 7 | 9 | 55 | 39 | +16 | 63 | Qualification for the CONCACAF Champions Cup round one (Note: As highest-ranked club in 2023 MLS Supporters' Shield not already qualified) |
| 3 | Columbus Crew (C) | 34 | 16 | 9 | 9 | 67 | 46 | +21 | 57 | Qualification for the CONCACAF Champions Cup round of 16 (Note: As MLS Cup 2023 champions) |
| 4 | St. Louis City SC | 34 | 17 | 12 | 5 | 62 | 45 | +17 | 56 | Qualification for the CONCACAF Champions Cup round one (Note: As 2023 Western Conference regular season champions) |
| 5 | Philadelphia Union | 34 | 15 | 9 | 10 | 57 | 41 | +16 | 55 | Qualification for the CONCACAF Champions Cup round one (Note: As 2023 Leagues Cup third place) |

Source: MLS
Rules for classification: 1) points; 2) total wins; 3) total goal differential; 4) total goals scored; 5) fewer disciplinary points; 6) away goal differential; 7) away goals scored; 8) home goals differential; 9) home goals scored; 10) coin toss (2 clubs tied) or drawing of lots (≥3 clubs tied)
(C) MLS Cup champion; (S) Supporters' Shield winner

=== MLS Cup Playoffs ===
In 2023, Major League Soccer introduced a new playoff format with an expanded field of 18 teams—the top nine teams from each conference with the #8 and #9 seeds playing a one-off wildcard game prior to the first round. Orlando qualified as the #2 seed in the East, entering in the first round which consisted of a best-of-three series. The round had no aggregate score and tied matches were decided by penalty shootout.

| October 30 Round One game 1 | #2 Orlando City | 1–0 | #7 Nashville SC | Orlando, Florida |
| 7:00 pm | Araújo (yellow card) 37'; Cartagena 41'; Schlegel (yellow card) 50' | Report | Lovitz (yellow card) 71'; Godoy (yellow card) 90+1' | Stadium: Exploria Stadium; Attendance: 19,744; Referee: Armando Villarreal |

| November 7 Round One game 2 | #7 Nashville SC | 0–1 | #2 Orlando City | Nashville, Tennessee |
| 9:00 pm | Surridge (yellow card) 23'; Godoy (yellow card) 24'; Bunbury (yellow card) 88'; Lovitz (yellow card) 90+3' | Report | Angulo 6'; Cartagena (yellow card) 27'; Pereyra (yellow card) 36'; Santos (yellow card) 60'; Schlegel (yellow card) 90+2'; Gallese (yellow card) 90+2' | Stadium: Geodis Park; Attendance: 25,315; Referee: Allen Chapman |
Note: Orlando City SC won the series 2–0.

| November 25 Conference semi-finals | #2 Orlando City | 0–2 (a.e.t.) | #3 Columbus Crew | Orlando, Florida |
| 5:30 pm | Schlegel (yellow card) 17' (yellow-red card) 77'; Cartagena (yellow card) 55'; Araújo (yellow card) 71'; Jansson (yellow card) 95'; Þórhallsson (yellow card) 104' | Report | Camacho (yellow card) 27'; Amundsen (yellow card) 45+1'; Ramírez 93', (yellow card) 117'; Hernández 118', (yellow card) 119' | Stadium: Exploria Stadium; Attendance: 25,527; Referee: Jon Freemon |

=== U.S. Open Cup ===
Orlando entered in the round of 32, a round later than the previous year, as one of four MLS teams competing in the CONCACAF Champions League.

| May 9 Round of 32 | Charlotte FC (North Carolina) | 1–0 | (Florida) Orlando City | Matthews, North Carolina |
| 7:00 pm | Bronico (yellow card) 18'; Bender (yellow card) 51'; Jóźwiak 70' | Report | Araújo (yellow card) 27'; Schlegel (yellow card) 74'; Jansson (yellow card) 78' | Stadium: Mecklenburg County Sportsplex; Attendance: 4,024; Referee: Guido Gonzales Jr. |

=== CONCACAF Champions League ===
Orlando contested the CONCACAF Champions League for the first time in 2023 having qualified as 2022 U.S. Open Cup champions. It was the club's second time appearing in continental competition after the 2021 Leagues Cup.

| March 7 R16 first leg | Tigres UANL (Mexico) | 0–0 | Orlando City | Monterrey, Mexico |
| 9:00 pm (CST) | Gignac (yellow card) 45+5' | Report | Jansson (yellow card) 90+4'; González (yellow card) 90+5' | Stadium: Estadio Universitario; Referee: Mario Escobar (Guatemala) |

| March 15 R16 second leg | Orlando City | 1–1 (1–1 (a) agg.) | (Mexico) Tigres UANL | Orlando, Florida |
| 7:15 pm | Pereyra (yellow card) 10'; Schlegel (yellow card) 25'; Araujo (yellow card) 27'; Kara 89' | Report | Córdova 21'; Samir (yellow card) 39' (yellow-red card) 90+6'; Gorriarán (yellow card) 77'; Carioca (yellow card) 84'; Pizarro (yellow card) 90' | Stadium: Exploria Stadium; Attendance: 21,112; Referee: Said Martínez (Honduras) |

=== Leagues Cup ===
The third edition of the Leagues Cup featured every MLS and Liga MX team for the first time with both leagues taking a month-long pause in their respective seasons to complete the "World Cup-style" tournament. Orlando City entered at the group stage as a seeded team.

Group stage

| July 21 Group stage | Orlando City | 1–1 (5–4 p) | Houston Dynamo FC | Orlando, Florida |
| 7:30 pm | Jansson (yellow card) 45+4'; Gallese (yellow card) 45+4'; McGuire 46'; Torres (yellow card) 64'; Angulo (yellow card) 89' | Report | Bassi 45+5' (pen.) | Stadium: Exploria Stadium; Attendance: 14,005; Referee: Filip Dujic |
| | Penalties |
| | Kara (penalty scored); Santos (penalty scored); Jansson (penalty scored); Carlos (penalty scored); Torres (penalty scored) | | (penalty missed) Herrera; (penalty scored) Úlfarsson; (penalty scored) Carrasquilla; (penalty scored) Dorsey; (penalty scored) B. Smith |

| July 29 Group stage | Santos Laguna (Mexico) | 2–3 | Orlando City | Orlando, Florida |
| 7:30 pm | López 41'; Rodríguez (yellow card) 45+1'; Brunetta (yellow card) 56'; Preciado 58'; Aquino (yellow card) 87'; Campos (yellow card) 90+1' | Report | Smith (yellow card) 27'; McGuire 44'; Pereyra 46'; Cartagena (yellow card) 75', (goal) 90+2'; Santos (yellow card) 83' | Stadium: Exploria Stadium; Attendance: 16,313; Referee: Victor Rivas |

| Pos | Team | Pld | W | PW | PL | L | GF | GA | GD | Pts | Qualification | ORL | HOU | SAN |
|---|---|---|---|---|---|---|---|---|---|---|---|---|---|---|
| 1 | (United States) Orlando City SC | 2 | 1 | 1 | 0 | 0 | 4 | 3 | +1 | 5 | Advance to knockout stage | — | 1–1 | — |
| 2 | (United States) Houston Dynamo FC | 2 | 0 | 1 | 1 | 0 | 3 | 3 | 0 | 3 | Advance to knockout stage | — | — | — |
| 3 | (Mexico) Santos Laguna | 2 | 0 | 0 | 1 | 1 | 4 | 5 | −1 | 1 | | 2–3 | 2–2 | — |

Source: Leagues Cup
Rules for classification: Tiebreakers

Knockout stage

| August 2 Round of 32 | Inter Miami CF | 3–1 | Orlando City | Fort Lauderdale, Florida |
| 8:00 pm | Messi 7', 72', (yellow card) 21'; Martínez 51' (pen.); Gómez (yellow card) 66' | Report | Araújo 17'; Smith (yellow card) 45+2'; Carlos (yellow card) 49'; McGuire (yellow card) 50'; Pereyra (yellow card) 57'; Gallese (yellow card) 90+11' | Stadium: DRV PNK Stadium; Attendance: 20,181; Referee: Iván Barton |

== Squad statistics ==
=== Appearances ===
As of match played November 25, 2023

Starting appearances are listed first, followed by substitute appearances after the + symbol where applicable.

| No. | Pos | Nat | Player | Total | | MLS | | Playoffs | | Open Cup | | Leagues Cup | | CCL | |
| No. | Pos | Nat | Player | Apps | Goals | Apps | Goals | Apps | Goals | Apps | Goals | Apps | Goals | Apps | Goals |
Goalkeepers
| 1 | GK | (Peru) PER | Pedro Gallese | 38 | 0 | 30 | 0 | 3 | 0 | 0 | 0 | 3 | 0 | 2 | 0 |
| 31 | GK | (United States) USA | Mason Stajduhar | 5 | 0 | 4 | 0 | 0 | 0 | 1 | 0 | 0 | 0 | 0 | 0 |
| 50 | GK | (Venezuela) VEN | Javier Otero | 0 | 0 | 0 | 0 | 0 | 0 | 0 | 0 | 0 | 0 | 0 | 0 |
| 99 | GK | (United States) USA | Adam Grinwis | 0 | 0 | 0 | 0 | 0 | 0 | 0 | 0 | 0 | 0 | 0 | 0 |
Defenders
| 3 | DF | (Brazil) BRA | Rafael Santos | 34 | 1 | 23+3 | 1 | 3 | 0 | 1 | 0 | 3 | 0 | 0+1 | 0 |
| 6 | DF | (Sweden) SWE | Robin Jansson | 43 | 0 | 31+3 | 0 | 3 | 0 | 1 | 0 | 3 | 0 | 2 | 0 |
| 15 | DF | (Argentina) ARG | Rodrigo Schlegel | 32 | 0 | 22+4 | 0 | 3 | 0 | 1 | 0 | 0 | 0 | 2 | 0 |
| 20 | DF | (Canada) CAN | Luca Petrasso | 14 | 0 | 4+8 | 0 | 0 | 0 | 0 | 0 | 0 | 0 | 2 | 0 |
| 24 | DF | (United States) USA | Kyle Smith | 32 | 1 | 17+8 | 1 | 0+3 | 0 | 0 | 0 | 3 | 0 | 0+1 | 0 |
| 25 | DF | (Brazil) BRA | Antônio Carlos | 24 | 1 | 16+2 | 1 | 0+3 | 0 | 0 | 0 | 3 | 0 | 0 | 0 |
| 26 | DF | (United States) USA | Michael Halliday | 21 | 0 | 9+9 | 0 | 0 | 0 | 1 | 0 | 0 | 0 | 2 | 0 |
| 28 | DF | (Somalia) SOM | Abdi Salim | 3 | 0 | 2+1 | 0 | 0 | 0 | 0 | 0 | 0 | 0 | 0 | 0 |
| 30 | DF | (United States) USA | Alex Freeman | 1 | 0 | 0+1 | 0 | 0 | 0 | 0 | 0 | 0 | 0 | 0 | 0 |
| 68 | DF | (United States) USA | Thomas Williams | 0 | 0 | 0 | 0 | 0 | 0 | 0 | 0 | 0 | 0 | 0 | 0 |
Midfielders
| 5 | MF | (Uruguay) URU | César Araújo | 42 | 2 | 31+2 | 1 | 3 | 0 | 1 | 0 | 3 | 1 | 2 | 0 |
| 8 | MF | (Brazil) BRA | Felipe Martins | 20 | 0 | 6+10 | 0 | 0+1 | 0 | 1 | 0 | 0+1 | 0 | 0+1 | 0 |
| 10 | MF | (Uruguay) URU | Mauricio Pereyra | 38 | 1 | 27+4 | 0 | 3 | 0 | 0 | 0 | 2 | 1 | 2 | 0 |
| 16 | MF | (Peru) PER | Wilder Cartagena | 32 | 3 | 23+1 | 1 | 3 | 1 | 0+1 | 0 | 3 | 1 | 0+1 | 0 |
| 21 | MF | (Brazil) BRA | Júnior Urso | 12 | 0 | 2+7 | 0 | 0+3 | 0 | 0 | 0 | 0 | 0 | 0 | 0 |
| 23 | MF | (Iceland) ISL | Dagur Dan Þórhallsson | 39 | 2 | 12+18 | 2 | 3 | 0 | 1 | 0 | 0+3 | 0 | 0+2 | 0 |
| 58 | MF | (Brazil) BRA | Juninho | 2 | 0 | 0+1 | 0 | 0 | 0 | 0 | 0 | 0+1 | 0 | 0 | 0 |
| 95 | MF | (United States) USA | Favian Loyola | 1 | 0 | 0+1 | 0 | 0 | 0 | 0 | 0 | 0 | 0 | 0 | 0 |
Forwards
| 7 | FW | (Argentina) ARG | Ramiro Enrique | 39 | 4 | 7+23 | 4 | 0+3 | 0 | 0+1 | 0 | 0+3 | 0 | 2 | 0 |
| 11 | FW | (Argentina) ARG | Martín Ojeda | 42 | 6 | 16+18 | 6 | 0+2 | 0 | 0+1 | 0 | 1+2 | 0 | 2 | 0 |
| 13 | FW | (United States) USA | Duncan McGuire | 37 | 15 | 17+12 | 13 | 3 | 0 | 1 | 0 | 3 | 2 | 0+1 | 0 |
| 14 | FW | (Ghana) GHA | Shak Mohammed | 0 | 0 | 0 | 0 | 0 | 0 | 0 | 0 | 0 | 0 | 0 | 0 |
| 17 | FW | (Uruguay) URU | Facundo Torres | 39 | 14 | 28+2 | 14 | 3 | 0 | 1 | 0 | 3 | 0 | 2 | 0 |
| 22 | FW | (Argentina) ARG | Gastón González | 21 | 0 | 7+11 | 0 | 0 | 0 | 1 | 0 | 0 | 0 | 0+2 | 0 |
| 27 | FW | (United States) USA | Jack Lynn | 3 | 0 | 0+3 | 0 | 0 | 0 | 0 | 0 | 0 | 0 | 0 | 0 |
| 32 | FW | (Puerto Rico) PUR | Wilfredo Rivera | 0 | 0 | 0 | 0 | 0 | 0 | 0 | 0 | 0 | 0 | 0 | 0 |
| 77 | FW | (Colombia) COL | Iván Angulo | 43 | 6 | 29+5 | 5 | 3 | 1 | 0+1 | 0 | 3 | 0 | 2 | 0 |
Players who appeared for the club but left during the season:
| 9 | FW | (Austria) AUT | Ercan Kara | 19 | 6 | 11+4 | 5 | 0 | 0 | 0 | 0 | 0+3 | 0 | 0+1 | 1 |
| 59 | MF | (Spain) ESP | Alejandro Granados | 1 | 0 | 0+1 | 0 | 0 | 0 | 0 | 0 | 0 | 0 | 0 | 0 |

=== Goalscorers ===
As of match played November 25, 2023

| Rank | No. | Pos. | Name | MLS | Playoffs | Open Cup | Leagues Cup | CCL | Total |
|---|---|---|---|---|---|---|---|---|---|
| 1 | 13 | FW | (United States) Duncan McGuire | 13 | 0 | 0 | 2 | 0 | 15 |
| 2 | 17 | FW | (Uruguay) Facundo Torres | 14 | 0 | 0 | 0 | 0 | 14 |
| 3 | 11 | FW | (Argentina) Martín Ojeda | 6 | 0 | 0 | 0 | 0 | 6 |
| 3 | 9 | FW | (Austria) Ercan Kara | 5 | 0 | 0 | 0 | 1 | 6 |
| 3 | 77 | FW | (Colombia) Iván Angulo | 5 | 1 | 0 | 0 | 0 | 6 |
| 6 | 7 | FW | (Argentina) Ramiro Enrique | 4 | 0 | 0 | 0 | 0 | 4 |
| 7 | 16 | MF | (Peru) Wilder Cartagena | 1 | 1 | 0 | 1 | 0 | 3 |
| 8 | 23 | MF | (Iceland) Dagur Dan Þórhallsson | 2 | 0 | 0 | 0 | 0 | 2 |
| 8 | 5 | MF | (Uruguay) César Araújo | 1 | 0 | 0 | 1 | 0 | 2 |
| 10 | 3 | DF | (Brazil) Rafael Santos | 1 | 0 | 0 | 0 | 0 | 1 |
| 10 | 24 | DF | (United States) Kyle Smith | 1 | 0 | 0 | 0 | 0 | 1 |
| 10 | 25 | DF | (Brazil) Antônio Carlos | 1 | 0 | 0 | 0 | 0 | 1 |
| 10 | 10 | MF | (Uruguay) Mauricio Pereyra | 0 | 0 | 0 | 1 | 0 | 1 |
| Own goal | | | | 1 | 0 | 0 | 0 | 0 | 1 |
| Total | | | | 55 | 2 | 0 | 5 | 1 | 63 |

=== Shutouts ===
As of match played November 25, 2023

| Rank | No. | Pos. | Name | MLS | Playoffs | Open Cup | Leagues Cup | CCL | Total |
|---|---|---|---|---|---|---|---|---|---|
| 1 | 1 | GK | (Peru) Pedro Gallese | 10 | 2 | 0 | 0 | 1 | 13 |
| 2 | 31 | GK | (United States) Mason Stajduhar | 1 | 0 | 0 | 0 | 0 | 1 |
| Total | | | | 11 | 2 | 0 | 0 | 1 | 14 |

=== Disciplinary record ===
As of match played November 25, 2023

| No. | Pos. | Name | MLS | | | Playoffs | | | Open Cup | | | Leagues Cup | | | CCL | | | Total | | |
| No. | Pos. | Name | Yellow card | (yellow card) (yellow-red card) | Red card | Yellow card | (yellow card) (yellow-red card) | Red card | Yellow card | (yellow card) (yellow-red card) | Red card | Yellow card | (yellow card) (yellow-red card) | Red card | Yellow card | (yellow card) (yellow-red card) | Red card | Yellow card | (yellow card) (yellow-red card) | Red card |
|---|---|---|---|---|---|---|---|---|---|---|---|---|---|---|---|---|---|---|---|---|
| 1 | GK | (Peru) Pedro Gallese | 3 | 0 | 0 | 1 | 0 | 0 | 0 | 0 | 0 | 2 | 0 | 0 | 0 | 0 | 0 | 6 | 0 | 0 |
| 3 | DF | (Brazil) Rafael Santos | 2 | 0 | 0 | 1 | 0 | 0 | 0 | 0 | 0 | 1 | 0 | 0 | 0 | 0 | 0 | 4 | 0 | 0 |
| 5 | MF | (Uruguay) César Araújo | 8 | 0 | 0 | 2 | 0 | 0 | 1 | 0 | 0 | 0 | 0 | 0 | 1 | 0 | 0 | 12 | 0 | 0 |
| 6 | DF | (Sweden) Robin Jansson | 5 | 0 | 0 | 1 | 0 | 0 | 1 | 0 | 0 | 1 | 0 | 0 | 1 | 0 | 0 | 9 | 0 | 0 |
| 7 | FW | (Argentina) Ramiro Enrique | 4 | 0 | 0 | 0 | 0 | 0 | 0 | 0 | 0 | 0 | 0 | 0 | 0 | 0 | 0 | 4 | 0 | 0 |
| 8 | MF | (Brazil) Felipe Martins | 4 | 0 | 0 | 0 | 0 | 0 | 0 | 0 | 0 | 0 | 0 | 0 | 0 | 0 | 0 | 4 | 0 | 0 |
| 9 | FW | (Austria) Ercan Kara | 1 | 0 | 0 | 0 | 0 | 0 | 0 | 0 | 0 | 0 | 0 | 0 | 0 | 0 | 0 | 1 | 0 | 0 |
| 10 | MF | (Uruguay) Mauricio Pereyra | 3 | 0 | 0 | 1 | 0 | 0 | 0 | 0 | 0 | 1 | 0 | 0 | 1 | 0 | 0 | 6 | 0 | 0 |
| 13 | FW | (United States) Duncan McGuire | 2 | 0 | 0 | 0 | 0 | 0 | 0 | 0 | 0 | 1 | 0 | 0 | 0 | 0 | 0 | 3 | 0 | 0 |
| 15 | DF | (Argentina) Rodrigo Schlegel | 3 | 0 | 0 | 2 | 1 | 0 | 1 | 0 | 0 | 0 | 0 | 0 | 1 | 0 | 0 | 7 | 1 | 0 |
| 16 | MF | (Peru) Wilder Cartagena | 8 | 0 | 1 | 2 | 0 | 0 | 0 | 0 | 0 | 1 | 0 | 0 | 0 | 0 | 0 | 11 | 0 | 1 |
| 17 | FW | (Uruguay) Facundo Torres | 2 | 0 | 0 | 0 | 0 | 0 | 0 | 0 | 0 | 1 | 0 | 0 | 0 | 0 | 0 | 3 | 0 | 0 |
| 21 | MF | (Brazil) Júnior Urso | 1 | 0 | 0 | 0 | 0 | 0 | 0 | 0 | 0 | 0 | 0 | 0 | 0 | 0 | 0 | 1 | 0 | 0 |
| 22 | FW | (Argentina) Gastón González | 0 | 0 | 0 | 0 | 0 | 0 | 0 | 0 | 0 | 0 | 0 | 0 | 1 | 0 | 0 | 1 | 0 | 0 |
| 23 | MF | (Iceland) Dagur Dan Þórhallsson | 2 | 0 | 0 | 1 | 0 | 0 | 0 | 0 | 0 | 0 | 0 | 0 | 0 | 0 | 0 | 3 | 0 | 0 |
| 24 | DF | (United States) Kyle Smith | 5 | 0 | 0 | 0 | 0 | 0 | 0 | 0 | 0 | 2 | 0 | 0 | 0 | 0 | 0 | 7 | 0 | 0 |
| 25 | DF | (Brazil) Antônio Carlos | 6 | 0 | 0 | 0 | 0 | 0 | 0 | 0 | 0 | 1 | 0 | 0 | 0 | 0 | 0 | 7 | 0 | 0 |
| 26 | DF | (United States) Michael Halliday | 2 | 0 | 0 | 0 | 0 | 0 | 0 | 0 | 0 | 0 | 0 | 0 | 0 | 0 | 0 | 2 | 0 | 0 |
| 31 | GK | (United States) Mason Stajduhar | 1 | 0 | 0 | 0 | 0 | 0 | 0 | 0 | 0 | 0 | 0 | 0 | 0 | 0 | 0 | 1 | 0 | 0 |
| 77 | FW | (Colombia) Iván Angulo | 5 | 0 | 0 | 0 | 0 | 0 | 0 | 0 | 0 | 1 | 0 | 0 | 0 | 0 | 0 | 6 | 0 | 0 |
| Total | | | 67 | 0 | 1 | 11 | 1 | 0 | 3 | 0 | 0 | 12 | 0 | 0 | 5 | 0 | 0 | 98 | 1 | 1 |

== Player movement ==
Per Major League Soccer and club policies, terms of the deals do not get disclosed.

=== MLS SuperDraft picks ===
Draft picks are not automatically signed to the team roster. The 2023 MLS SuperDraft was held on December 21, 2022. Orlando made four selections.

2023 Orlando City MLS SuperDraft Picks
| Round | Selection | Player | Position | College | Status |
|---|---|---|---|---|---|
| 1 | 2 | (Ghana) Shak Mohammed | FW | (North Carolina) Duke University | Signed |
| 1 | 6 | (United States) Duncan McGuire | FW | (Nebraska) Creighton University | Signed |
| 1 | 17 | (Somalia) Abdi Salim | DF | (New York (state)) Syracuse University | Signed |
| 2 | 46 | (Germany) Luis Grassow | DF | University of Kentucky | Not signed |

=== Transfers in ===
| No. | Name | Pos. | Transferred from | Fee/notes | Date | Ref. |
|---|---|---|---|---|---|---|
| 20 | (Canada) Luca Petrasso | LB | (Canada) Toronto FC | Traded in exchange for $300,000 GAM with a potential $100,000 GAM pending performance-based conditions. | November 9, 2022 | |
| 8 | (Brazil) Felipe Martins | CM | (United States) Austin FC | Free agent signing. | November 22, 2022 | |
| 95 | (United States) Favian Loyola | AM | (United States) Orlando City B | Homegrown signing. | December 2, 2022 | |
| 3 | (Brazil) Rafael Santos | LB | (Brazil) Cruzeiro | Undisclosed fee | January 5, 2023 | |
| 11 | (Argentina) Martín Ojeda | LW | (Argentina) Godoy Cruz | Undisclosed fee, reportedly $4m | January 7, 2023 | |
| 7 | (Argentina) Ramiro Enrique | CF | (Argentina) Banfield | Undisclosed fee, reportedly $2m | January 26, 2023 | |
| 23 | (Iceland) Dagur Dan Þórhallsson | CM | (Iceland) Breiðablik | Undisclosed fee | January 31, 2023 | |
| 59 | (Spain) Alejandro Granados | AM | (United States) Orlando City B | Signed short-term contract. | June 9, 2023 | |
| 50 | (Venezuela) Javier Otero | GK | (United States) Orlando City B | Signed short-term contract. | June 16, 2023 | |
| 50 | (Venezuela) Javier Otero | GK | (United States) Orlando City B | Signed Homegrown contract. | July 10, 2023 | |
| 21 | (Brazil) Júnior Urso | CM | (Brazil) Coritiba | | July 19, 2023 | |

=== Loans in ===
| No. | Name | Pos. | Loaned from | Notes | Date | Ref. |
|---|---|---|---|---|---|---|
| 16 | (Peru) Wilder Cartagena | DM | (United Arab Emirates) Al-Ittihad Kalba | Loan extension option exercised. | November 14, 2022 | |
| 58 | (Brazil) Juninho | MF | (Brazil) Vasco da Gama | Signed short-term contract via Orlando City B. | June 16, 2023 | |

=== Transfers out ===
| No. | Name | Pos. | Transferred to | Fee/notes | Date | Ref. |
|---|---|---|---|---|---|---|
| 11 | (Brazil) Júnior Urso | CM | (Brazil) Coritiba | Mutually terminated contract; signed with Coritiba on 12/22/22 | November 10, 2022 | |
| 20 | (United States) Nicholas Gioacchini | CF | (United States) St. Louis City SC | Selected in the 2022 MLS Expansion Draft. | November 11, 2022 | |
| 7 | (Brazil) Alexandre Pato | CF | (Brazil) São Paulo | Contract expired; signed with São Paulo on 5/26/23 | November 14, 2022 | |
| 13 | (Canada) Tesho Akindele | CF | Retired | Option declined; retired on 12/20/22 | November 14, 2022 | |
| 34 | (Jamaica) Joey DeZart | DM | (United States) Huntsville City FC | Option declined; signed with Huntsville City on 3/21/23 | November 14, 2022 | |
| 22 | (Ecuador) Alexander Alvarado | LW | (Ecuador) L.D.U. Quito | Exercised option to buy. | November 29, 2022 | |
| 4 | (Portugal) João Moutinho | LB | (Italy) Spezia | Contract expired; signed with Spezia on 12/2/22 | December 2, 2022 | |
| 21 | (United States) Andrés Perea | CM | (United States) Philadelphia Union | Traded in exchange for $750,000 GAM with a potential $100,000 GAM pending performance-based conditions. Orlando retain an undisclosed sell-on percentage | December 6, 2022 | |
| 2 | (Brazil) Ruan | RB | (United States) D.C. United | Traded in exchange for the No.2 pick in the 2023 MLS SuperDraft. | December 21, 2022 | |
| 19 | (United States) Benji Michel | RW | (Portugal) Arouca | Contract expired; signed with Arouca on 1/6/23 | January 6, 2023 | |
| 23 | (Republic of Ireland) Jake Mulraney | LM | (Republic of Ireland) St Patrick's Athletic | Undisclosed fee | January 18, 2023 | |
| 59 | (Spain) Alejandro Granados | CM | (Belgium) Club Brugge | Undisclosed fee | August 8, 2023 | |
| 9 | (Austria) Ercan Kara | CF | (Turkey) Samsunspor | Undisclosed fee | September 2, 2023 | |
