= Victor Yan =

Brazilian footballer

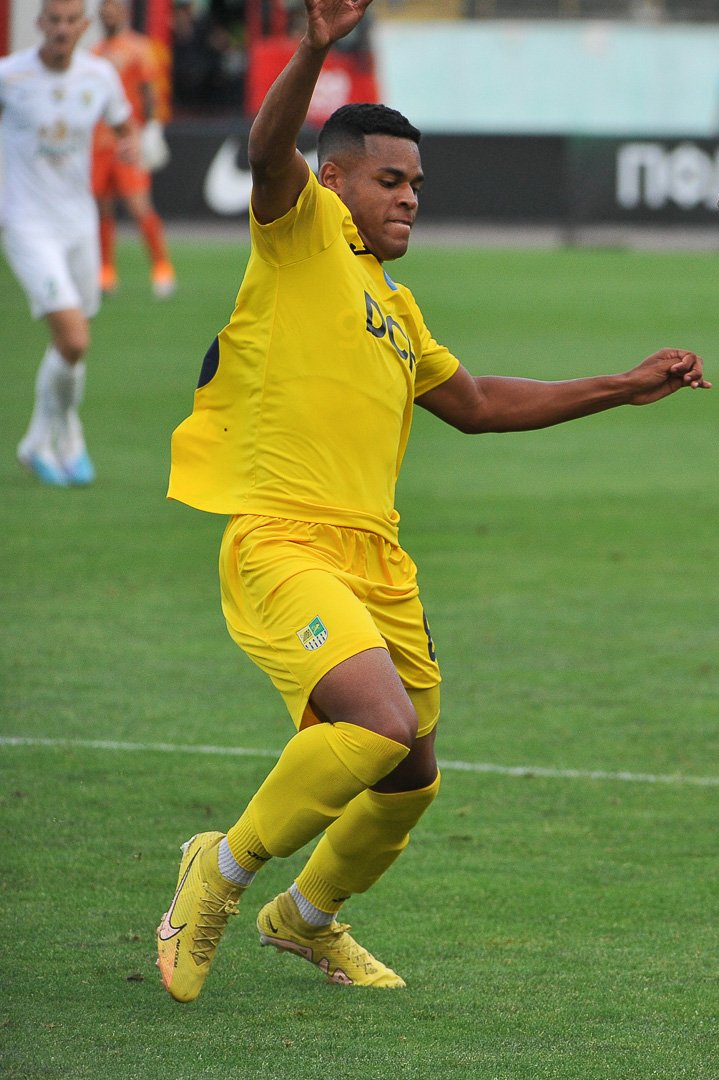

Personal information
- Full name: Victor Yan Souza Santos
- Date of birth: 9 April 2001 (age 25)
- Place of birth: Taboão da Serra, Brazil
- Height: 1.74 m (5 ft 9 in)
- Position: Midfielder

Team information
- Current team: Metalist Kharkiv
- Number: 88

Youth career
- 2011–2022: Santos

Senior career*
Years	Team	Apps	(Gls)
2018–2022	Santos	0	(0)
2022	Orlando City B	20	(1)
2023	Cuiabá	0	(0)
2023	Metalist Kharkiv	5	(0)

International career^{‡}
2017–2018	Brazil U17	6	(0)
- * Club domestic league appearances and goals as of 26 January 2025 ‡ National team caps and goals as of 28 October 2017

Victor Yan Souza Santos (born 9 April 2001), known as Victor Yan, is a Brazilian professional footballer who plays as a midfielder for Ukrainian club Metalist Kharkiv.

== Club career ==
=== Santos ===
Born in Taboão da Serra, Victor Yan joined Santos' youth setup in 2011, aged ten. On 29 August 2017, he signed his first professional contract with the club, lasting until August 2022.

In January 2018, Victor Yan was promoted to the first team squad by new manager Jair Ventura. He made his senior debut aged 16 on 11 March 2018, coming on as a 77th-minute substitute for fellow youth graduate Robson Bambu in a 3–1 Campeonato Paulista home loss against São Bento. He suffered a fractured ankle in training two days later and subsequently had surgery, keeping him sidelined for three months. Victor Yan returned to the under-20 squad in August 2018 but was unable to establish himself as a regular starter for the side.

For the 2019 season, Victor Yan continued with the under-20 team. On 23 May 2019, he made his under-23 debut in the Campeonato Brasileiro Sub-23. He continued to move between the under-20 and under-23 teams but struggled to break back into the first team. In April 2021, Victor Yan was named as a substitute for the first team for a Campeonato Paulista game against Corinthians and again against Red Bull Bragantino but did not make an appearance in either game. In November 2021, he took legal action in an attempt to leave Santos, questioning the length of his five-year contract set to expire in August 2022 but his appeal was rejected in court and he returned to train with the under-20 team, later changing agents and expressing a desire to stay and win a place on the team. Having been registered for the team's 2022 Copa São Paulo de Futebol Júnior squad, he was late cut on 31 December 2021, surprising both the player and his agent. Able to sign a pre-contract from 28 February 2022, Yan's representatives reportedly held talks with clubs in Portugal, Spain, Greece and Netherlands, as efforts to end his time at Santos intensified.

=== Orlando City ===
On 14 April 2022, it was announced Orlando City B had completed the signing of Victor Yan to an MLS Next Pro contract. Santos reportedly retained a 20% sell-on fee. He made 20 appearances, scoring his only goal on 21 May, in a 6–0 win over Inter Miami CF II.

=== Cuiabá ===
On 9 February 2023, Victor Yan returned to his home country after agreeing to a deal with Cuiabá. He was released on 12 July, after failing to make a first team appearance.

== International career ==
On 16 February 2017, Victor Yan was called up to Brazil under-17s to contest the 2017 South American Under-17 Football Championship. He appeared once, starting in a 2–0 win against Argentina as Brazil won the tournament. He also featured in the 2017 Montaigu Tournament and represented Brazil at the 2017 FIFA U-17 World Cup, making one appearance in a round of 16 victory against Honduras.

== Career statistics ==
As of 23 September 2022

Appearances and goals by club, season and competition
Club	Season	League			State League		Cup		Continental		Other		Total	
Club	Season	Division	Apps	Goals	Apps	Goals	Apps	Goals	Apps	Goals	Apps	Goals	Apps	Goals
Santos	2018	Série A	0	0	1 (Note: Appearance(s) in Campeonato Paulista)	0	0	0	0	0	—		1	0
Orlando City B	2022	MLS Next Pro	20	1	—		—		—		—		20	1
Cuiabá	2023	Série A	0	0	0	0	0	0	—		—		0	0
Career total			21	1	1	0	0	0	0	0	0	0	21	1

== Honours ==
Brazil U17

- South American Under-17 Football Championship: 2017
- FIFA U-17 World Cup third place: 2017
