= Javier Otero =

Venezuelan footballer (born 2002)

- Otero with Orlando City in 2026

Personal information
- Full name: Javier Alejandro Otero León
- Date of birth: 18 November 2002 (age 23)
- Place of birth: Cumaná, Venezuela
- Height: 1.98 m (6 ft 6 in)
- Position: Goalkeeper

Team information
- Current team: Orlando City
- Number: 12

Youth career
- 2018–2019: Orlando City

Senior career*
Years	Team	Apps	(Gls)
2020–2023	Orlando City B	33	(0)
2022	→ Orlando City (loan)	0	(0)
2023–	Orlando City	5	(0)
2023–2026	→ Orlando City B (loan)	23	(0)

International career^{‡}
2023–	Venezuela	1	(0)
- * Club domestic league appearances and goals as of 02:08, 15 March 2026 (UTC) ‡ National team caps and goals as of 10 December 2023

Javier Alejandro Otero León (born 18 November 2002) is a Venezuelan professional footballer who plays as a goalkeeper for Major League Soccer club Orlando City and the Venezuela national team.

== Early career ==
Otero joined the U.S. Soccer Development Academy of Major League Soccer side Orlando City in 2018.

== Club career ==
=== Orlando City B ===
He made his debut for the club's reserve affiliate Orlando City B on 24 October 2020, starting in a 4–1 loss to Greenville Triumph in USL League One.

=== Orlando City ===
On 15 June 2022, Otero signed a short-term MLS contract to be rostered for Orlando City's game against New England Revolution in the absence of regular backup Mason Stajduhar. He was not named to the matchday squad behind Pedro Gallese and Adam Grinwis.

On 10 July 2023 Otero signed a MLS Homegrown contract with Orlando City through 2024 with an option for an additional two years.

On 28 June 2024, Otero made his debut for Orlando City after Mason Stajduhar suffered a broken tibia and fibula following a collision with Malachi Jones in a New York City FC attack that proved to be offside. Orlando would lose the game 4–2 with Otero conceding three of those goals.

Ahead of the 2025 season, Otero became the backup goalkeeper to Pedro Gallese following Mason Stajduhar's transfer to Real Salt Lake. On 22 March, Otero made his first start for Orlando City, letting only one goal in a 4–1 victory over D.C. United. On 7 May, Otero recorded his first clean sheet for the team in a 5–0 victory over the Tampa Bay Rowdies in the 2025 U.S. Open Cup. Later, on 20 May, Otero signed a new contract with the team through the 2026 season with club options for 2027 and 2028.

On 15 April 2026, Otero made seven saves in a 1–0 win over FC Naples in the 2026 U.S. Open Cup, and one of those saves was voted as the save of the round.

== International career ==
On 2 June 2023, Otero was called up to the Venezuela national team by Fernando Batista for a friendly match against Guatemala and Honduras, but he did not make an appearance. Later that year on 10 December, Otero made his international debut in a 1–0 friendly loss to Colombia. On 11 January 2025, Otero was once again called up, this time for a friendly against the United States, but he did not make an appearance. Otero received another call up for friendly matches against Argentina and Belize on 10 October and 15 October respectively. Venezuela's match against Belize in Chicago was canceled after the event's production company failed to find an alternative venue due to security issues in the city caused by protests from the U.S. National Guard being deployed to the city.

On 22 May 2026, Otero was recalled to the national team for friendlies against Turkey and Iraq.

== Personal life ==
Born in Venezuela, Otero also holds Spanish nationality.

== Career statistics ==
=== Club ===
As of 12 August 2026

Club	Season	League			U.S. Open Cup		Continental		Playoffs		Other		Total	
Club	Season	Division	Apps	Goals	Apps	Goals	Apps	Goals	Apps	Goals	Apps	Goals	Apps	Goals
Orlando City B	2020	USL League One	1	0	—		—		—		—		1	0
Orlando City B	2022	MLS Next Pro	17	0	—		—		—		—		17	0
Orlando City B	2023	MLS Next Pro	15	0	—		—		—		—		15	0
Orlando City B	Total		33	0	0	0	0	0	0	0	0	0	33	0
Orlando City (loan)	2022	Major League Soccer	0	0	—		—		—		—		0	0
Orlando City	2023	Major League Soccer	0	0	0	0	0	0	0	0	0	0	0	0
Orlando City	2024	Major League Soccer	1	0	—		0	0	0	0	0	0	1	0
Orlando City	2025	Major League Soccer	2	0	1	0	—		—		0	0	3	0
Orlando City	2026	Major League Soccer	2	0	3	0	—		—		1 (Note: Appearances in Leagues Cup)	0	6	0
Orlando City	Orlando City total		5	0	4	0	0	0	0	0	1	0	10	0
Orlando City B (loan)	2023	MLS Next Pro	9	0	—		—		1	0	—		10	0
Orlando City B (loan)	2024	MLS Next Pro	9	0	—		—		0	0	—		9	0
Orlando City B (loan)	2025	MLS Next Pro	4	0	—		—		—		—		4	0
Orlando City B (loan)	2026	MLS Next Pro	1	0	—		—		—		—		1	0
Orlando City B (loan)	Total		23	0	0	0	0	0	0	0	0	0	24	0
Career total			61	0	4	0	0	0	1	0	1	0	67	0

=== International ===
As of match played 10 December 2023

Appearances and goals by national team and year
National team	Year	Apps	Goals
Venezuela	2023	1	0
Total		1	0

== Honours ==
Individual

- MLS Next Pro Goalkeeper of the Month: March/April 2022
