= Michael Halliday (soccer, born 2003) =

American soccer player

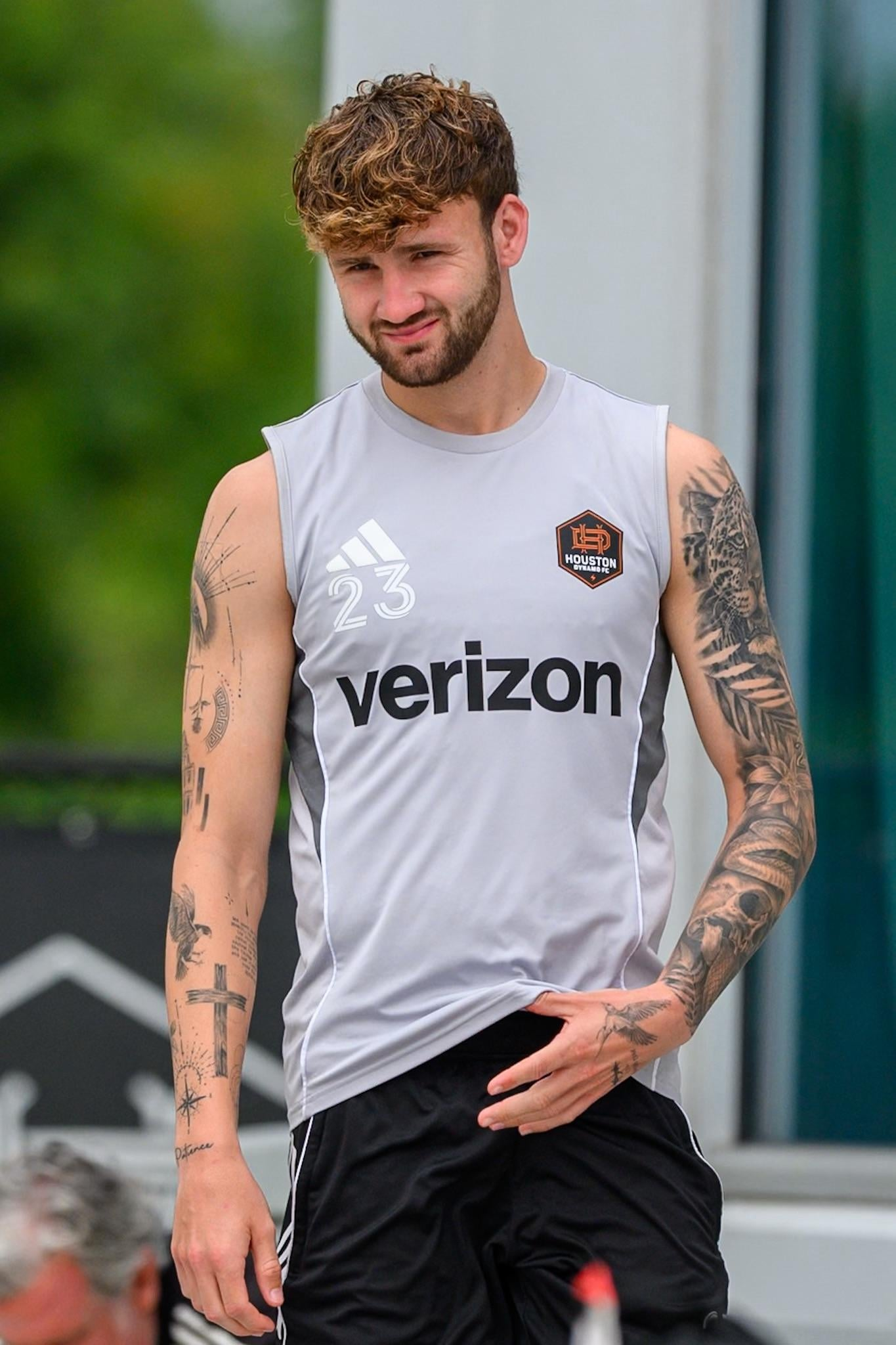
- Halliday with Houston Dynamo in 2025

Personal information
- Full name: Michael Anthony Halliday
- Date of birth: January 22, 2003 (age 23)
- Place of birth: Orlando, Florida, U.S.
- Height: 6 ft 1 in (1.85 m)
- Position: Defender

Youth career
- 2016–2020: Orlando City

Senior career*
Years	Team	Apps	(Gls)
2020–2025	Orlando City	36	(0)
2020–2022	→ Orlando City B (loan)	12	(0)
2025	Houston Dynamo	0	(0)
2025	→ Houston Dynamo 2 (loan)	6	(0)

International career^{‡}
2022–2023	United States U20	12	(0)
- * Club domestic league appearances and goals as of July 25, 2025 ‡ National team caps and goals as of June 4, 2023

Michael Anthony Halliday (born January 22, 2003) is an American professional soccer player who plays as a defender.

== Youth career ==
Halliday was born in Orlando, Florida, but grew up in Apopka. In 2016, Halliday joined Orlando City Academy's U-13 side and progressed through the academy.

== Club career ==
=== Orlando City B ===
Ahead of the 2020 season on March 3, Halliday was named to the Orlando City B roster. On August 1, Halliday made his senior debut in a 2–0 loss to Tormenta FC.

In 2021, Orlando City B went into hiatus after withdrawing from USL League One due to the possibility of an MLS reserve league launching in 2021, but that was delayed until 2022 with the launch of MLS Next Pro.

In the inaugural MLS Next Pro season, Halliday only made five appearances with the reserve team as he spent most of his time with the senior team.

=== Orlando City ===
On July 15, 2020, Halliday was signed to the senior team without making an appearance for the reserve team due to the COVID-19 pandemic delaying the start of the 2020 USL League One season until July 18. Halliday's signing made him the team's ninth homegrown signing and at 17 years, 5 months, and 23 days of age, the youngest player to sign with the first team since Tommy Redding in 2014. In his first season with the Lions, he did not make an appearance for the senior team.

On May 29, 2021, Halliday made his debut for the club when he started in a 2–1 loss against the New York Red Bulls.

In the 2022 season, Halliday spent much of his time on the bench, but on October 16, Halliday made his MLS Cup playoffs debut when he came on as a 87th-minute substitute for Ruan in a 2–0 loss to CF Montréal.

In 2023, Halliday made the most appearances he had in his senior career, but suffered an injury in June which saw him lose his spot to new signing Dagur Dan Þórhallsson. In the following season, Halliday's playing time declined and he only made one start in a 3–1 win over Cavalry FC in the 2024 CONCACAF Champions Cup on February 27.

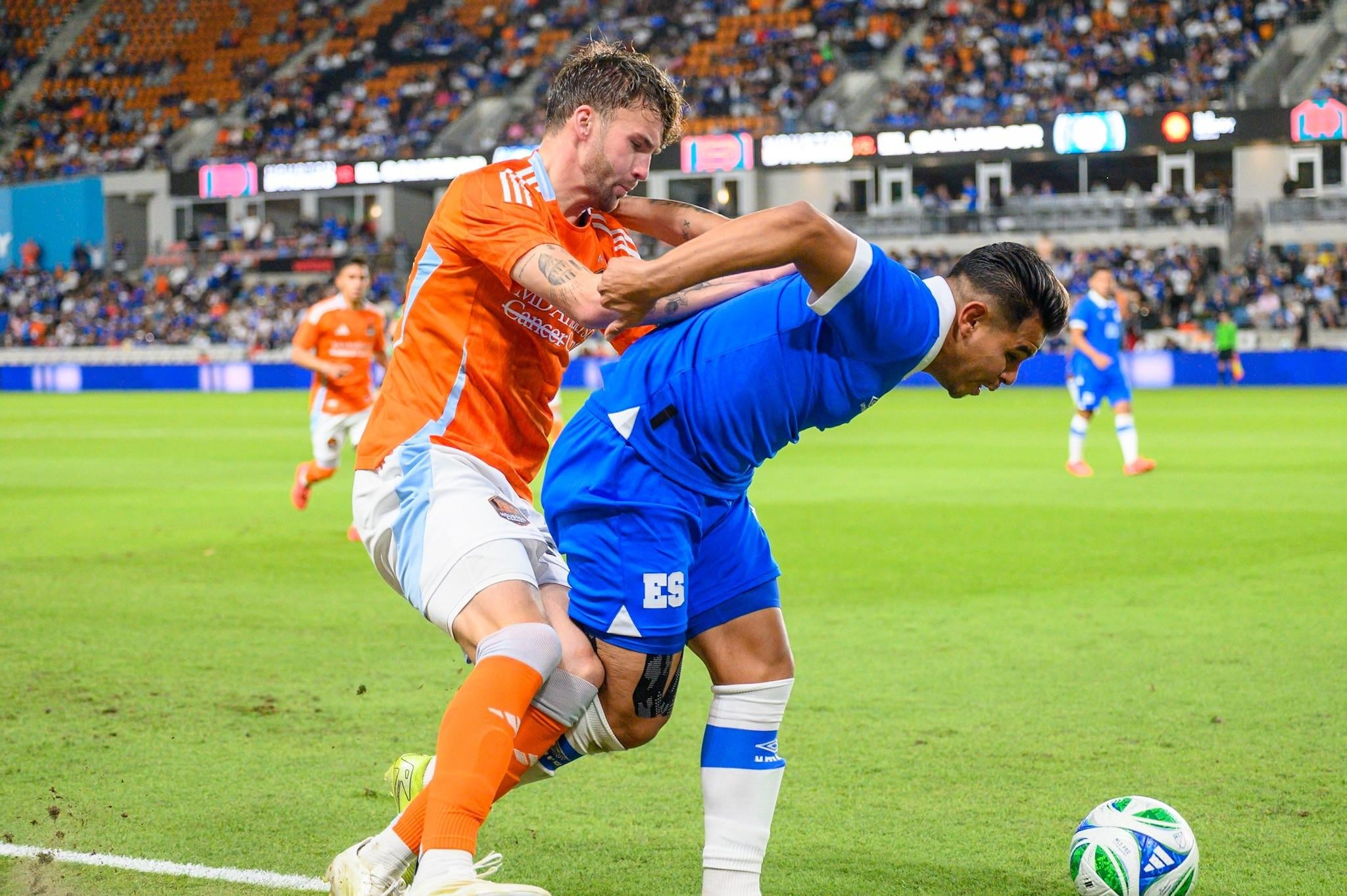
Halliday challenges El Salvador's Alexander Larín during a friendly in 2025 with the Houston Dynamo

=== Houston Dynamo ===
On February 18, 2025, Halliday was acquired by fellow Major League Soccer club Houston Dynamo on a one-year contract with a club option for 2026 and 2027 in exchange for a first round draft pick in the 2026 MLS SuperDraft. On March 20, Halliday made his unofficial debut in a 2–1 friendly victory over the El Salvador national team. On April 6, 2025, Halliday made an appearance with Houston Dynamo 2, playing the full match of a 1–0 win over Los Angeles FC 2. At the end of the season, Halliday failed to make a competitive appearance with the Dynamo, and the team announced that they would allow his contract to expire at the end of the season.

== Career statistics ==
=== Club ===
As of July 25, 2025

Club	Season	League			Playoffs		National cup		Continental		Other		Total	
Club	Season	Division	Apps	Goals	Apps	Goals	Apps	Goals	Apps	Goals	Apps	Goals	Apps	Goals
Orlando City	2020	Major League Soccer	0	0	0	0	0	0	—		0	0	0	0
Orlando City	2021	Major League Soccer	6	0	0	0	—		—		—		6	0
Orlando City	2022	Major League Soccer	6	0	1	0	2	0	—		—		9	0
Orlando City	2023	Major League Soccer	18	0	0	0	1	0	2 (Note: Appearance(s) in CONCACAF Champions Cup)	0	0	0	21	0
Orlando City	2024	Major League Soccer	6	0	0	0	—		1	0	0	0	7	0
Orlando City	Total		36	0	1	0	3	0	3	0	0	0	43	0
Orlando City B (loan)	2020	USL League One	7	0	—		—		—		—		7	0
Orlando City B (loan)	2022	MLS Next Pro	5	0	—		—		—		—		5	0
Orlando City B (loan)	Total		12	0	0	0	0	0	0	0	0	0	12	0
Houston Dynamo	2025	Major League Soccer	0	0	—		0	0	—		0	0	0	0
Houston Dynamo 2 (loan)	2025	MLS Next Pro	6	0	—		—		—		—		6	0
Career total			54	0	1	0	3	0	3	0	0	0	61	0

== Honors ==
Orlando City

- U.S. Open Cup: 2022

United States U20

- CONCACAF U-20 Championship: 2022
