= Ignacio Galván =

Argentine footballer

Personal information
- Date of birth: 6 September 2002 (age 24)
- Place of birth: Buenos Aires, Argentina
- Height: 1.83 m (6 ft 0 in)
- Position: Left-back

Team information
- Current team: Atlético Tucumán (on loan from Racing Club)
- Number: 21

Youth career
- 2007–2014: Cover de Almagro
- 2014–2021: Racing Club

Senior career*
Years	Team	Apps	(Gls)
2021–	Racing Club	18	(0)
2022	→ Orlando City B (loan)	18	(0)
2024	→ Defensa y Justicia (loan)	9	(0)
2025–	→ Atlético Tucumán (loan)	32	(1)
- * Club domestic league appearances and goals as of 17:37, 9 November 2026 (UTC)

Ignacio Galván (born 6 September 2002) is an Argentine professional footballer who plays as a left-back for the Argentine Primera División club Atlético Tucumán, on loan from Racing Club.

== Club career ==
Galván began playing football with the youth academy of Cover de Almagro at the age of 5, before moving to Racing Club's youth academy at the age of 12. He made his professional debut with Racing Club in a 2–0 Copa Libertadores win over Sporting Cristal on 11 May 2021. He signed his first professional contract with the club on 17 May 2021, keeping him at the club until 2025.
