= Favian Loyola =

Footballer (born 2005)

Personal information
- Full name: Favian Antonio Loyola
- Date of birth: 18 May 2005 (age 21)
- Place of birth: Marine Corps Base Camp Lejeune, North Carolina, U.S.
- Height: 5 ft 10 in (1.78 m)
- Position: Attacking midfielder

Team information
- Current team: Audax Italiano
- Number: 17

Youth career
- 2021–2022: Orlando City

Senior career*
Years	Team	Apps	(Gls)
2022	Orlando City B	11	(6)
2022–2025	Orlando City	1	(0)
2023–2025	→ Orlando City B (loan)	64	(5)
2026–	Audax Italiano	15	(0)

International career^{‡}
2022	United States U17	1	(0)
2022–2024	United States U19	8	(0)
2024–2025	Chile U20	6	(2)
- * Club domestic league appearances and goals as of 04:07, 10 November 2026 (UTC) ‡ National team caps and goals as of 15 January 2026

Favian Antonio Loyola (born 18 May 2005) is a professional footballer who plays as a midfielder for Liga de Primera club Audax Italiano. Born in the United States, he represented the United States internationally up to the under-19 level before switching to represent Chile at the under-20 level.

== Club career ==
Born at Camp Lejeune in North Carolina, Loyola's family moved to Florida where he joined the Orlando City SC academy. In 2021, he was part of the under-17 academy team coached by Javi Carrillo that won the MLS Next U17 National Championship title. Loyola was named MVP at the 2022 MLS Next All-Star Game.

=== Orlando City ===
He continued with the academy to begin the 2022 season before being elevated to the professional Orlando City B side for the inaugural 2022 MLS Next Pro season. He made his professional debut on 19 June 2022, as a 69th-minute substitute in a 6–1 defeat to Columbus Crew 2. He scored his first goals on 17 July, a brace in a 4–3 victory over Chicago Fire FC II. In total, Loyola scored six goals in 11 appearances during the 2022 season.

On 2 December 2022, Loyola signed a three-year MLS homegrown contract with the Orlando City first team ahead of the 2023 season. On 1 July 2023, he debuted for the senior side when he came on as a substitution for Facundo Torres in a 3–1 victory over Chicago Fire. On 17 November 2025, the team announced that they would allow Loyola's contract to expire and were not interested in pursuing a new contract.

=== Audax Italiano ===
On 15 January 2026, Loyola moved to Chile and signed with Audax Italiano in the Liga de Primera. Loyola made his debut for Audax Italiano at Universidad de Chile in the opening match of the season as an 88th-minute substitute for Michael Vadulli. The match, which ended scoreless despite two red cards for the home team, was marred by disturbances in the stands by fans which caused the match to be delayed, including a fire which had to be put out in the stands. On 28 April, Loyola scored his first goal for the club in extra time to secure a 1–1 draw at Barracas Central in Copa Sudamericana.

== International career ==
In April 2022, Loyola was named to a United States under-19 training camp by Marko Mitrović for the first time. In June 2022, he was part of the under-19 squad that traveled to Spain for friendlies against England and Norway. He was recalled to the squad in September 2022 for the Slovenia Nations Cup to face Malta, Croatia and Scotland. Loyola started in the squad that won the tournament following a 2–1 victory over Croatia.

In June 2024, Loyola switched to represent Chile under-20s. He was called up for friendlies against Australia, scoring on his debut in a 2–2 draw on June 8.

== Personal life ==
Born to a Chilean father and an Italian mother, he has an older brother, Donovan, who is also a soccer player who most recently played for Chilean side Universidad Católica.

== Career statistics ==
As of match played 25 September 2026

Club	Season	League			National cup (Note: Includes U.S. Open Cup and Copa Chile)		Playoffs		Continental		Other		Total	
Club	Season	Division	Apps	Goals	Apps	Goals	Apps	Goals	Apps	Goals	Apps	Goals	Apps	Goals
Orlando City B	2022	MLS Next Pro	11	6	—		—		—		—		11	6
Orlando City B (loan)	2023	MLS Next Pro	20	2	—		0	0	—		—		20	2
Orlando City B (loan)	2024	MLS Next Pro	24	3	—		1	0	—		—		25	3
Orlando City B (loan)	2025	MLS Next Pro	20	0	—		—		—		—		20	0
Orlando City B (loan)	Total		75	11	0	0	1	0	0	0	0	0	76	11
Orlando City	2023	Major League Soccer	1	0	0	0	0	0	0	0	0	0	1	0
Orlando City	2024	Major League Soccer	0	0	—		0	0	0	0	0	0	0	0
Orlando City	2025	Major League Soccer	0	0	0	0	0	0	—		0	0	0	0
Orlando City	Total		1	0	0	0	0	0	0	0	0	0	1	0
Audax Italiano	2026	Liga de Primera	15	0	5	0	—		5 (Note: Appearance in Copa Sudamericana)	1	3 (Note: Appearances in Copa de la Liga)	0	28	1
Career total			91	11	5	0	1	0	5	1	3	0	105	12
