= Quembol Guadalupe =

Peruvian-American soccer player

Quembol Junior Guadalupe Alegría (born February 3, 2004) is a soccer player who plays as a defender for FC Cajamarca in the Peruvian Segunda División. Born in the United States to parents from Peru, he has represented both countries at youth international level.

== Early and personal life ==
Guadalupe was born in New Jersey, United States. His uncle Luis Guadalupe (also known as "Cuto") and cousin Jefferson Farfán were both international players for the Peru national team. At age 5, his parents took him to Peru, where he grew up in Chincha Alta and began playing in sporting academies from age 7. Aged 12, he played as a forward and scored a hat-trick in a 3–2 win over Sporting Cristal, leading the Lima-based club to sign him.

== Club career ==
During the COVID-19 pandemic in Peru, Guadalupe was out of contract and his agents sent videos to Orlando City SC in the United States. He moved to Florida to join the club in October 2020 and played for the reserve team in MLS Next Pro, while gaining advice from compatriot first-team goalkeeper Pedro Gallese. Due to an anterior cruciate ligament injury on international duty in July 2022, he missed the entire year 2023 and was waived by Orlando.

Guadalupe returned to Sporting Cristal in January 2024 as its first signing. He arrived injured, and was only chosen for the substitutes' bench three times. In June, having not played at all, he and teammate Gabriel Alfaro were loaned to Comerciantes Unidos for the Clausura period of the season. He played three games, one as a starter, totalling 102 minutes.

In February 2025, Guadalupe left Cristal permanently, signing for FC Cajamarca in the Peruvian Segunda División.

== International career ==
Guadalupe played for Peru at under-15 level, but was unable to play for the under-17 team due to the COVID-related disruption to football in Peru when he was that age. In April 2022, he trained with the United States under-20 team, while telling the Peruvian media of his upset in not being called up by the Peruvian Football Federation apart from for training matches against the senior team. On July 12, 2022 he played for Peru under-20 in a 2–1 friendly loss at home to neighbors Chile, suffering an injury that would rule him out for 18 months.
