= Mauro Bravo =

Spanish footballer (born 1999)

Personal information
- Full name: Mauro Bravo Fernández
- Date of birth: 30 July 1999 (age 27)
- Place of birth: Madrid, Spain
- Height: 1.72 m (5 ft 8 in)
- Position: Forward

Team information
- Current team: Moscardó
- Number: 21

Youth career
- Atlético Madrid
- Greystones United
- Villanueva Pardillo
- Rayo Majadahonda
- Leganés
- Alcorcón

College career
Years	Team	Apps	(Gls)
2018–2019	Iona Gaels	35	(15)
2020–2021	FIU Panthers	23	(5)

Senior career*
Years	Team	Apps	(Gls)
2022	Orlando City B	7	(1)
2022–2023	Irodotos	1	(0)
2023	Al-Riffa		(1)
2023	Londrina	2	(0)
2024	Amazonas	1	(0)
2024–2025	Amorebieta	17	(0)
2025–	Moscardó	23	(4)
- * Club domestic league appearances and goals as of 16 May 2026

Mauro Bravo Fernández (born 30 July 1999) is a Spanish footballer who plays as a forward for Segunda Federación club Moscardó.

== Club career ==
=== Collegiate soccer ===
Born in Madrid, Spain, Bravo began his career in the academy of Atlético Madrid, before a stint with Irish side Greystones United. He returned to Spain, spending time with amateur side Villanueva del Pardillo, as well as Rayo Majadahonda and Leganés, before joining the academy of Alcorcón. He left Alcorcón to move to the United States in 2018, enrolling at the Iona University, where he joined their soccer team: the Gaels. In 2020, he transferred to the Florida International University, where he played for the Panthers.

=== Professional career ===
Following his senior year, he was offered a contract with MLS Next Pro side Orlando City B. However, after less than a year with the club, he left for Greece, joining Irodotos of the Super League Greece 2. Following one appearance for Irodotos, he was released by the club in January 2023. Later in the same month, he moved to Bahrain, signing for Al-Riffa, where he would go on to score one goal, in a 7–0 win against Al-Budaiya. He left Al-Riffa following the expiration of his contract in July 2023.

In August 2023, Bravo was reported to have signed a professional contract with Brazilian Série B side Londrina. The move was made official two weeks later, with Bravo signing a deal until the end of the 2023 season. Following two appearances, Bravo left the club following the expiration of his contract, returning to Spain, but stating that he would "definitely go back [to Brazil]" if offered the chance.

In January 2024, Bravo returned to Brazil, joining Amazonas.

On 3 September 2024, Bravo signed with Amorebieta in the Spanish third-tier Primera Federación, marking his first experience in his home country's league system.

== Career statistics ==
=== Club ===
As of 13 February 2024.

Appearances and goals by club, season and competition
Club	Season	League			Cup		Other		Total	
Club	Season	Division	Apps	Goals	Apps	Goals	Apps	Goals	Apps	Goals
Orlando City B	2022	MLS Next Pro	7	1	–		0	0	7	1
Irodotos	2022–23	Super League Greece 2	1	0	0	0	0	0	1	0
Londrina	2023	Série B	2	0	0	0	0	0	2	0
Amazonas	2024	Série B	0	0	0	0	0	0	0	0
Career total			11	1	0	0	0	0	11	1
