= Alejandro Granados =

Spanish footballer (born 2006)

Personal information
- Full name: Alejandro Granados Torres
- Date of birth: 30 May 2006 (age 20)
- Place of birth: Alicante, Spain
- Height: 1.80 m (5 ft 11 in)
- Position: Midfielder

Team information
- Current team: Club NXT
- Number: 70

Youth career
- Hércules
- 2021–2023: Orlando City

Senior career*
Years	Team	Apps	(Gls)
2022–2023	Orlando City B	20	(0)
2023	Orlando City	1	(0)
2023–	Club NXT	70	(4)

International career^{‡}
2023	Spain U17	5	(1)
2023–2024	Spain U18	4	(0)
2024–2025	Spain U19	11	(0)
Medal record
Men's football
Representing Spain
UEFA European Under-19 Championship
Runner-up	2025 Romania
- * Club domestic league appearances and goals as of 20 April 2026 ‡ National team caps and goals as of 26 June 2025 (UTC)

Alejandro Granados Torres (born 30 May 2006) is a Spanish professional footballer who plays as a midfielder for Club NXT of the Belgian Challenger Pro League.

== Early life ==
Granados was born in Alicante, Spain, to Cuban parents in 2006 and moved to the United States at the age of nine. He started his youth career with the youth academy of Spanish side Hércules.

== Club career ==
Granados started his senior career with American side Orlando City B, debuting for the club at the age of fifteen.

On 9 June 2023, Granados signed a short-term agreement with Orlando City.

After one substitute appearance totaling just one minute for the first team, on 8 August 2023, Orlando City announced the transfer of Granados to Club Brugge for an undisclosed fee, reported to be around $2 million. He was initially assigned in their reserve team Club NXT.

== International career ==
Granados is a youth international for Spain. He was called up to the Spain U17 for the 2023 UEFA European Under-17 Championship in Hungary, where he scored in the quarter-final against Ireland.

In 2025, he was included in the Spain U19 squad for the 2025 UEFA European Under-19 Championship in Romania. He appeared as a substitute during Spain's 1–0 defeat to the Netherlands in the final.

== Style of play ==
Granados mainly operates as a midfielder and is left-footed and is known for his offensive capabilities.

== Career statistics ==
As of match played 20 December 2025

Appearances and goals by club, season and competition
Club	Season	League			National cup		Continental		Other		Total	
Club	Season	Division	Apps	Goals	Apps	Goals	Apps	Goals	Apps	Goals	Apps	Goals
Orlando City B	2022	MLS Next Pro	15	0	—		—		—		15	0
Orlando City B	2023	MLS Next Pro	11	0	—		—		—		11	0
Orlando City B	Total		26	0	—		—		—		26	0
Orlando City	2023	MLS	1	0	—		—		—		1	0
Club NXT	2023–24	Challenger Pro League	23	1	—		—		—		23	1
Club NXT	2024–25	Challenger Pro League	24	1	—		—		—		24	1
Club NXT	2025–26	Challenger Pro League	16	2	—		—		—		16	2
Club NXT	Total		63	4	—		—		—		63	4
Club Brugge	2025–26	Belgian Pro League	0	0	1	0	0	0	—		1	0
Career total			90	4	1	0	0	0	0	0	91	4

== Honours ==
Spain U19

- UEFA European Under-19 Championship runner-up: 2025
