= 2022 New York City FC II season =

New York City FC II
2022 season
- Head coach: Matt Pilkington
- Stadium: Belson Stadium (Queens, New York)
- MLS Next Pro: TBD
- Biggest win: NYC 7–0 MIA (4/16)
- Biggest defeat: CLB 3–0 NYC (8/7)

The 2022 New York City FC II season was the inaugural season of New York City FC's development team. They will compete in MLS Next Pro, a new league sitting on the third tier of the United States soccer league system, and partly serving as a development league for Major League Soccer.

== Player movement ==
=== In ===
| No. | Pos. | Player | Transferred from | Fee/notes | Date | Source |
|---|---|---|---|---|---|---|
| 27 | CF | (United States) Jonathan Jimenez | (United States) University of North Carolina | Transfer | January 19, 2022 | |
| 30 | DF | (Ghana) Samuel Owusu | (United States) New York City FC Academy | Transfer | January 19, 2022 | |
| 33 | DF | (United States) Nicholas Benalcazar | (United States) Wake Forest University | Transfer | January 19, 2022 | |
| 32 | DF | (United States) Vukasin Bulatovic | (United States) Purdue Fort Wayne Mastodons | Transfer | March 1, 2022 | |
| 40 | MF | (United States) Kenan Hot | Unattached | Transfer | March 1, 2022 | |
| 31 | MF | (United States) Jack Beer | Unattached | Transfer | March 24, 2022 | |
| 34 | DF | (United States) Stephen Turnbull | Unattached | Transfer | March 24, 2022 | |
| 36 | FW | (Morocco) El Mahdi Youssoufi | Unattached | Transfer | March 24, 2022 | |
| 37 | MF | (United States) Stevo Bednarsky | (United States) Lehigh Mountain Hawks | Transfer | March 24, 2022 | |
| 38 | FW | (United States) John Denis | Unattached | Transfer | March 24, 2022 | |
| 39 | FW | (United States) Andrew Maia | (Brazil) Esporte Clube Vitória | Transfer | March 24, 2022 | |
| 41 | FW | (United States) Julián Gómez | (United States) Monmouth Hawks | Transfer | March 24, 2022 | |
| 42 | MF | (Peru) Piero Elias | (United States) Queensboro FC Academy | Transfer | March 24, 2022 | |
| 50 | GK | (United States) Giuliano Santucci | (Colombia) Patriotas Boyacá | Transfer | March 24, 2022 | |
| 54 | GK | (United States) Alex Rando | Unattached | Transfer | March 24, 2022 | |

== Roster ==
Current as of April 24, 2022.

| Squad No. | Roster | Name | Nationality | Position(s) | Since | Date of birth (age) | Signed from | Games played (Note: Regular season only, does not include appearances for NYCFC in Major League Soccer) | Goals scored |
Goalkeepers
| 13 | MLS | Luis Barraza | (United States) | GK | 2019 | November 8, 1996 (age 29) | Chicago FC United | 1 | 0 |
| 50 | Next Pro | Giuliano Santucci | (United States) | GK | 2022 | August 17, 1999 (age 26) | Patriotas Boyacá | 0 | 0 |
| 52 | Next Pro | Pol Rodriguez | (Spain) | GK | 2022 | June 23, 2002 (age 23) | Queensboro FC Academy | 1 | 0 |
| 54 | Next Pro | Alex Rando | (United States) | GK | 2022 | April 15, 2001 (age 24) | Unattached | 4 | 0 |
Defenders
| 2 | MLS | Chris Gloster | (United States) | DF | 2021 | 28 July 2000 (age 25) | Jong PSV | 1 | 1 |
| 30 | MLS | Samuel Owusu | (Ghana) | DF | 2022 | 13 December 2000 (age 25) | New York City FC Academy | 4 | 0 |
| 32 | Next Pro | Vukasin Bulatovic | (United States) | DF | 2022 | 8 July 2000 (age 25) | Purdue Fort Wayne Mastodons | 1 | 0 |
| 33 | MLS | Nico Benalcazar | (United States) | DF | 2022 | 6 June 2001 (age 24) | Wake Forest University | 6 | 0 |
| 34 | Next Pro | Stephen Turnbull | (United States) | DF | 2022 | 13 March 1998 (age 27) | Unattached | 5 | 2 |
| 47 | Academy | Klevis Haxhari | (Albania) | DF | | 1 May 2005 (age 20) | | 2 | 0 |
| 60 | Academy | Kamran Acito | (United States) | DF | | 5 March 2004 (age 21) | | 1 | 0 |
| 61 | Academy | Diego Rossi | (United States) | DF | | 19 May 2005 (age 20) | | 1 | 0 |
Midfielders
| 31 | Next Pro | Jack Beer | (United States) | MF | 2022 | June 15, 1999 (age 26) | Lansdowne Yonkers FC | 6 | 2 |
| 37 | Next Pro | Stevo Bednarsky | (United States) | MF | 2022 | 8 August 1998 (age 27) | Lehigh Mountain Hawks | 5 | 0 |
| 40 | Academy | Kenan Hot | (United States) | MF | 2022 | 16 March 2004 (age 21) | Unattached | 5 | 1 |
| 42 | Next Pro | Piero Elias | (Peru) | MF | 2022 | 8 September 2002 (age 23) | Queensboro FC Academy | 6 | 0 |
| 45 | Academy | Brian Flores | (Puerto Rico) | MF | | 25 August 2003 (age 22) | | 2 | 1 |
| 64 | Academy | Francesco Di Ponzio | (United States) | MF | | 21 July 2005 (age 20) | | 2 | 0 |
| 80 | MLS | Justin Haak | (United States) | MF | 2019 | September 12, 2001 (age 24) | New York Soccer Club | 2 | 0 |
Forwards
| 22 | MLS | Kevin O'Toole | (United States) | FW | 2022 | 14 December 1998 (age 27) | New York Red Bulls U-23 | 2 | 0 |
| 27 | MLS | Jonathan Jimenez | (United States) | FW | 2022 | 25 April 2001 (age 24) | University of North Carolina | 5 | 3 |
| 28 | Next Pro | John Denis | (United States) | FW | 2022 | 3 February 1998 (age 27) | Unattached | 6 | 3 |
| 36 | Next Pro | El Mahdi Youssoufi | (Morocco) | FW | 2022 | 18 September 1998 (age 27) | Unattached | 3 | 0 |
| 39 | Next Pro | Andrew Maia | (United States) | FW | 2022 | 1 September 2002 (age 23) | Esporte Clube Vitória | 0 | 0 |
| 41 | Next Pro | Julián Gómez | (United States) | FW | 2022 | 17 January 2001 (age 25) | Monmouth Hawks | 4 | 1 |
| 58 | Academy | Dren Dobruna | (Albania) | FW | | 29 May 2005 (age 20) | | 2 | 0 |
| 79 | Academy | Massimo Murania Yankowitz | (United States) | FW | | 24 February 2004 (age 21) | | 6 | 2 |

== Non-competitive ==
Win Draw Loss

== Competitive ==
=== MLS Next Pro ===
==== Standings ====
===== Eastern Conference =====
| Pos | Div | Team | Pld | W | SOW | SOL | L | GF | GA | GD | Pts | Qualification |
|---|---|---|---|---|---|---|---|---|---|---|---|---|
| 3 | NE | Philadelphia Union II | 24 | 11 | 3 | 1 | 9 | 42 | 39 | +3 | 40 | Qualification for the 2022 MLS Next Pro Playoffs |
| 4 | NE | Rochester New York FC | 24 | 10 | 4 | 2 | 8 | 37 | 30 | +7 | 40 | Qualification for the 2022 MLS Next Pro Playoffs |
| 5 | NE | New York City FC II | 24 | 9 | 4 | 2 | 9 | 49 | 35 | +14 | 37 | |
| 6 | CT | Inter Miami CF II | 24 | 10 | 1 | 4 | 9 | 40 | 49 | −9 | 36 | |
| 7 | NE | New England Revolution II | 24 | 9 | 1 | 4 | 10 | 27 | 42 | −15 | 33 | |

Source: MLSNP Eastern Conference
Rules for classification: 1) points; 2) total wins; 3) total goal differential; 4) total goals scored; 5) fewer disciplinary points; 6) away goal differential; 7) away goals scored; 8) home goals differential; 9) home goals scored; 10) coin toss (2 clubs tied) or drawing of lots (≥3 clubs tied)

===== Overall table =====
| Pos | Team | Pld | W | SOW | SOL | L | GF | GA | GD | Pts |
|---|---|---|---|---|---|---|---|---|---|---|
| 8 | Philadelphia Union II | 24 | 11 | 3 | 1 | 9 | 42 | 39 | +3 | 40 |
| 9 | Rochester New York FC | 24 | 10 | 4 | 2 | 8 | 37 | 30 | +7 | 40 |
| 10 | New York City FC II | 24 | 9 | 4 | 2 | 9 | 49 | 35 | +14 | 37 |
| 11 | Inter Miami CF II | 24 | 10 | 1 | 4 | 9 | 40 | 49 | −9 | 36 |
| 12 | Minnesota United FC 2 | 24 | 9 | 4 | 1 | 10 | 43 | 39 | +4 | 36 |

Source: MLSNP
Rules for classification: 1) points; 2) total wins; 3) total goal differential; 4) total goals scored; 5) fewer disciplinary points; 6) away goal differential; 7) away goals scored; 8) home goals differential; 9) home goals scored; 10) coin toss (2 clubs tied) or drawing of lots (≥3 clubs tied)

==== Matches ====
| March 27 1 | New York City FC II | 2–2 (3–4 SO) | New England Revolution II | Queens, New York |
| 5:00PM EST | Denis 9'; Gloster 36' (pen.) | Report | Rivera 7', 70' | Stadium: Belson Stadium; Referee: Christian Centeno |

| April 3 2 | Orlando City B | 2–2 (4–3 SO) | New York City FC II | Kissimmee, Florida |
| 6:00PM EST | Tablante 18'; Boccuzzo 39' (pen.) | Report | Denis 36' (pen.); Hot 45+3' | Stadium: Osceola County Stadium; Referee: Brandon Stevis |

| April 10 3 | Toronto FC II | 3–1 | New York City FC II | Toronto, Ontario, Canada |
| 1:00PM EST | Rothrock 44'; Mbongue 75', 79' | Report | Beer 56' | Stadium: BMO Training Ground; Referee: Ben Hoskins |

| April 16 4 | New York City FC II | 7–0 | Inter Miami CF II | Queens, New York |
| 1:00PM EST | Denis 12' (pen.); Murania Yankowitz 16', 58'; Turnbull 57'; Beer 68'; Gómez 86'; Jimenez 88' | Report | Romeo Beckham (red card) 85' | Stadium: Belson Stadium |

| April 23 5 | Rochester New York FC | 2–3 | New York City FC II | Brighton, New York |
| 7:00PM EST | Inalien 20' (pen.), 65' | Report | Turnbull 32'; Jiminez 48', 90+3' | Stadium: John L. DiMarco Field; Referee: Thomas Snyder |

| April 30 6 | Philadelphia Union II | 2–1 | New York City FC II | Chester, Pennsylvania |
| 4:00PM EST | Donovan 50'; Craig 75' | Report | Turnbull 90+2' | Stadium: Subaru Park; Referee: Gary Gutierrez |

| May 8 7 | New York City FC II | 4–1 | Toronto FC II | Queens, New York |
| | Jimenez 20'; Denis 68' (pen.); Elias 81'; Youssoufi 90+1' | Report | Coello Camarero 45' (pen.) | Stadium: Belson Stadium; Referee: Kenneth Rojas |

| May 15 8 | New York City FC II | 0–1 | Columbus Crew 2 | Queens, New York |
| | | Report | Russell-Rowe 54'; Quinton (red card) 71' | Stadium: Belson Stadium; Referee: Luis Arroyo |

| May 21 9 | New York City FC II | 3–0 | Chicago Fire FC II | Queens, New York |
| | Haak 54'; Murania Yankowitz 78' (pen.); Youssoufi 82' | Report | | Stadium: Belson Stadium; Referee: Greg Dopka |

| May 29 10 | Inter Miami CF II | 1–2 | New York City FC II | Fort Lauderdale, Florida |
| 7:00 PM EDT | Quinteros 23' | Report | Denis 41'; Turnbull 85' | Stadium: DRV PNK Stadium; Referee: Ricardo Fierro |

| June 4 11 | Orlando City B | 1–1 (3–5 SO) | New York City FC II | Kissimmee, Florida |
| | Lynn 14'; Hackenberg (yellow card) 48'; Yan (yellow card) 61'; Granados (yellow card) 86'; Van Marter (yellow card) 90+1' | Report | Bednarsky (yellow card) 25'; Turnbull (yellow card) 52'; Denis 62'; Owusu (yellow card) 90+3' | Stadium: Osceola County Stadium; Referee: Adam Brzozowiec |
| | Shootout |
| | Boccuzzo (penalty scored); Lynn (penalty scored); Guske (penalty scored); Bravo (penalty missed) | | (penalty scored) Denis; (penalty scored) Murania Yankowitz; (penalty scored) Elias; (penalty scored) Benalcazar; (penalty scored) Beer |

| June 18 12 | New York City FC II | 0–2 | Toronto FC II | Queens, New York |
| 1:00 PM EDT | | Report | Altobelli 50'; Antonoglou 75' | Stadium: Belson Stadium; Referee: Justin Saporito |

| June 27 13 | Philadelphia Union II | 0–5 | New York City FC II | Chester, Pennsylvania |
| 7:00 PM EDT | Riasco (yellow card) 56' (yellow-red card) 57' | Report | Jasson 7'; Denis 36'; Murania Yankowitz 59'; Beer 80'; Jimenez 89' | Stadium: Subaru Park; Referee: José Carlos Rivero |

| July 2 14 | New York City FC II | 5–1 | FC Cincinnati 2 | Queens, New York |
| 7:00 PM EDT | Denis 3', 4'; Elias 16'; Jimenez 18'; Gómez 71' | Report | Akindele 56' | Stadium: Belson Stadium; Referee: Kenneth Rojas |

| July 10 15 | New England Revolution II | 0–4 | New York City FC II | Foxborough, Massachusetts |
| | O'Hearn (yellow card) 45'; Michel (yellow card) 61'; Ben Reveno (yellow card) 90' | Report | Denis 2', (penalty scored) 7', (penalty scored) 45', 45+3'; Youssoufi (penalty missed) 29'; Bednarsky (yellow card) 72'; Turnbull (yellow card) 73' | Stadium: Gillette Stadium; Referee: John Rush |

| July 16 16 | New York City FC II | 0–1 | Rochester New York FC | Queens, New York |
| 7:00 PM EDT | | Report | Inalien 77' | Stadium: Belson Stadium; Referee: Albert Kyei-Mensah |

| July 24 17 | New York City FC II | 2–2 (4–2 SO) | Inter Miami CF II | Queens, New York |
| | Turnbull 17'; Owusu (yellow card) 43'; Jasson 63'; Denis (yellow card) 82'; Elias (yellow card) 85' | Report | Méndez (yellow card) 45+1' (yellow-red card) 90+7'; Ruiz (yellow card) 57'; Borgelin 66', 69' | Stadium: Belson Stadium; Referee: Izlen Peksenar |
| | Shootout |
| | Elias (penalty scored); Jasson (penalty scored); Benalcazar (penalty scored); Barraza (penalty scored) | | Hundal (penalty missed); Allen (penalty scored); Beckham (penalty scored); Reyes (penalty missed) |

| August 7 18 | Columbus Crew 2 | 3–0 | New York City FC II | Columbus, Ohio |
| 5:00 PM EDT | Russell-Rowe 2', 74'; Zawadzki 12'; Parente (yellow card) 30'; Farsi (yellow card) 45+2'; Mohamed (yellow card) 52' | Report | McFarlane (yellow card) 77' | Stadium: Historic Crew Stadium; Referee: Kyle Johnston |

| August 12 19 | New York City FC II | 0–2 | Orlando City B | Queens, New York |
| 8:00 PM EDT | | Report | Lynn 30', 51'; Pareja (yellow card) 34'; Yan (yellow card) 56'; Forth (yellow card) 66'; Silva (red card) 90+3' | Stadium: Belson Stadium; Referee: José Carlos Rivero |

| August 20 20 | Chicago Fire FC II | 5–0 | New York City FC II | Bridgeview, Illinois |
| 7:00 PM CDT | Espinoza (yellow card) 7'; Quintos 16'; Oregel (yellow card) 22'; Bezerra 27'; Burks (yellow card) 45+1'; Penn 64', 67'; M. Rodriguez 71' | Report | Elias (yellow card) 34' | Stadium: SeatGeek Stadium; Referee: Becky Pagan |

| August 24 21 | New York City FC II | 1–2 | Philadelphia Union II | Queens, New York |
| | Haxhari (yellow card) 36'; Jimenez 58' | Report | Riasco (yellow card) 28', (goal) 64'; Oliver (yellow card) 83'; Pierre 86' | Stadium: Belson Stadium; Referee: Melinda Sopka |

| September 10 22 | New York City FC II | 0–0 (4–2 SO) | New England Revolution II | Queens, New York |
| 8:00 PM EDT | Di Ponzio (yellow card) 64' | Report | Reveno (yellow card) 85' | Stadium: Belson Stadium; Referee: Nickrod Fateh |
| | Shootout |
| | Beer (penalty scored); Jimenez (penalty scored); Benalcazar (penalty scored); Gómez (penalty scored) | | (penalty missed) Italo; (penalty scored) Silva; (penalty missed) Rozhansky; (penalty scored) Ryan Lima |

| September 14 23 | FC Cincinnati 2 | 0–4 | New York City FC II | Highland Heights, Kentucky |
| 3:30 PM EDT | Valenzuela (yellow card) 23' | Report | Jimenez 19', 24'; Gómez 45'; Turnbull (yellow card) 61'; Owusu 69' | Stadium: NKU Soccer Stadium; Referee: Youssef Elmessoussi |

| September 18 24 | Rochester New York FC | 2–2 (3–5 SO) | New York City FC II | Brighton, New York |
| 3:00pm EDT | Dolabella 57'; Rayo 71' (pen.) | Report | Jimenez 34'; Denis 68' (pen.) | Stadium: John L. DiMarco Field; Referee: Jeremy Scheer |
| | Shootout |
| | Lopez (penalty scored); Rayo (penalty scored); Costa (penalty missed); Batiz (penalty scored) | | (penalty scored) Denis; (penalty scored) Jimenez; (penalty scored) Benalcazar; (penalty scored) Elias; (penalty scored) Owusu |
