= 2024 MLS Next Pro season =

MLS Next Pro
- Season: 2024
- Dates: March 15 – October 6 (regular season)
- Champions: North Texas SC (1st Title)
- Regular season title: North Texas SC (1st Title)
- Matches: 421 (406 RS, 15 PO)
- Goals: 1,445 (3.43 per match) (1386 RS, 59)
- Best player: (United States) David Poreba (Chicago Fire FC II)
- Top goalscorer: (United States) David Poreba (Chicago Fire FC II) (18 goals)
- Best goalkeeper: (United States) Michael Collodi (North Texas SC)
- Biggest home win: NTX 8–2 MU2 (October 6)
- Biggest away win: NYR 1–5 PU2 (May 26); TFC 1–5 CHA (September 29)
- Highest scoring: NYR 5–5 (4–3 PK) CHI (April 14); NTX 8–2 MU2 (October 6)
- Longest winning run: 4 VEN
- Longest losing run: 3 HD2
- Highest attendance: 12,022; STL 5–0 TAC (October 6)
- All statistics correct as of October 6, 2024.

The 2024 MLS Next Pro season was the third season of MLS Next Pro, the second-tier league of Major League Soccer. It began March 15 and concluded on October 6.

Austin FC II and the Colorado Rapids 2 are the defending playoff and regular season champions, respectively.

Two independent clubs, Carolina Core FC and Chattanooga FC began play in the league. Chattanooga previously played in the National Independent Soccer Association, while Carolina Core is an expansion club.

== Teams ==
=== Stadiums and locations ===
Team	Stadium	Capacity
Atlanta United 2	Fifth Third Bank Stadium	8,318
Austin FC II	Parmer Field	1,000
Carolina Core FC	Truist Point	4,500
Chattanooga FC	Finley Stadium	20,412
Chicago Fire FC II	SeatGeek Stadium	20,000
FC Cincinnati 2	NKU Soccer Stadium	1,000
Colorado Rapids 2	Denver Soccer Stadium	2,000
Columbus Crew 2	Historic Crew Stadium	19,968
Crown Legacy FC	Sportsplex at Matthews	5,000
Houston Dynamo 2	SaberCats Stadium	3,200
Huntsville City FC	Joe W. Davis Stadium	6,000
Inter Miami CF II	Chase Stadium	21,000
Los Angeles FC 2	Titan Stadium	10,000
Minnesota United FC 2	Allianz Field	19,600
Minnesota United FC 2	National Sports Center	5,500
New England Revolution II	Gillette Stadium	20,000
New England Revolution II	Mark A. Ouellette Stadium	1,500
New York City FC II	Belson Stadium	2,168
New York Red Bulls II	MSU Soccer Park at Pittser Field	5,000
North Texas SC	Choctaw Stadium	48,114
Orlando City B	Osceola County Stadium	5,300
Philadelphia Union II	Subaru Park	18,500
Portland Timbers 2	Providence Park	25,218
Real Monarchs	Zions Bank Stadium	5,000
Sporting Kansas City II	Rock Chalk Park	2,500
Sporting Kansas City II	Swope Soccer Village	1,500
St. Louis City 2	CityPark	22,423
The Town FC	Saint Mary's Stadium	5,500
Toronto FC II	York Lions Stadium	4,000
Tacoma Defiance	Starfire Sports Complex	4,500
Ventura County FC	William Rolland Stadium	3,000
Whitecaps FC 2	Swangard Stadium	5,288

=== Personnel and sponsorship ===
Team	Head coach
Atlanta United 2	(England) Steve Cooke
Austin FC II	(United States) Brett Uttley
Carolina Core FC	(United States) Roy Lassiter
Chattanooga FC	(United States) Rod Underwood
Chicago Fire FC II	(France) Ludovic Taillandier
FC Cincinnati 2	(Jamaica) Tyrone Marshall
Colorado Rapids 2	(United States) Erik Bushey
Columbus Crew 2	(United States) Kelvin Jones
Crown Legacy FC	(Portugal) José Tavares
Houston Dynamo 2	(United States) Kenny Bundy
Huntsville City FC	(Wales) Jack Collison
Inter Miami CF II	(Argentina) Federico Higuaín
Los Angeles FC 2	(United States) Junior Gonzalez
Minnesota United FC 2	(United States) Jeremy Hall
New England Revolution II	(United States) Richie Williams
New York City FC II	(United States) Matt Pilkington
New York Red Bulls II	(Uganda) Ibrahim Sekagya
North Texas SC	(Wales) John Gall
Orlando City B	(Argentina) Manuel Goldberg
Philadelphia Union II	(United States) Marlon LeBlanc
Portland Timbers 2	(Canada) Serge Dinkota
Real Monarchs	(England) Mark Lowry
Sporting Kansas City II	(United States) Benny Feilhaber
St. Louis City 2	(United States) Bobby Murphy
The Town FC	(United States) Dan DeGeer
Toronto FC II	(Canada) Gianni Cimini
Tacoma Defiance	(South Africa) Hervé Diese
Ventura County FC	(United States) Matt Taylor
Whitecaps FC 2	(United States) Ricardo Clark

== Regular season ==
During the regular season, teams played 28 matches each in a mostly regionalized schedule. Each conference was divided into divisions of seven or eight teams for scheduling.

=== Conference standings ===
==== Eastern Conference ====
Pos	Div	Team	Pld	W	SOW	SOL	L	GF	GA	GD	Pts	Qualification
1	NE	FC Cincinnati 2	28	16	2	2	8	47	34	+13	54	Qualification for the Playoffs
2	NE	Philadelphia Union II	28	15	3	1	9	59	41	+18	52	Qualification for the Playoffs
3	SE	Inter Miami CF II	28	14	0	6	8	53	45	+8	48	Qualification for the Playoffs
4	NE	Chicago Fire FC II	28	11	5	4	8	51	51	0	47	Qualification for the Playoffs
5	SE	Orlando City B	28	11	4	5	8	53	42	+11	46	Qualification for the Playoffs
6	NE	New York City FC II	28	11	3	6	8	58	46	+12	45	Qualification for the Playoffs
7	NE	Columbus Crew 2	28	11	4	4	9	53	47	+6	45	Qualification for the Playoffs
8	SE	Crown Legacy FC	28	11	5	2	10	51	46	+5	45	Qualification for the Playoffs
9	SE	Chattanooga FC	28	9	8	2	9	45	42	+3	45	
10	SE	Carolina Core FC	28	12	3	1	12	39	45	−6	43	
11	NE	New York Red Bulls II	28	10	4	2	12	56	61	−5	40	
12	NE	Toronto FC II	28	10	1	5	12	44	51	−7	37	
13	SE	Atlanta United 2	28	7	4	3	14	42	64	−22	32	
14	SE	Huntsville City FC	28	8	0	5	15	39	53	−14	29	
15	NE	New England Revolution II	28	4	4	2	18	37	59	−22	22	

Source: MLSNP Eastern Conference
Rules for classification: 1) points; 2) total wins; 3) total goal differential; 4) total goals scored; 5) fewer disciplinary points; 6) away goal differential; 7) away goals scored; 8) home goals differential; 9) home goals scored; 10) coin toss (2 clubs tied) or drawing of lots (≥3 clubs tied)

==== Western Conference ====
Pos	Div	Team	Pld	W	SOW	SOL	L	GF	GA	GD	Pts	Qualification
1	FR	North Texas SC	28	16	6	2	4	56	32	+24	62	Qualification for the Playoffs
2	FR	St. Louis City 2	28	17	1	3	7	53	35	+18	56	Qualification for the Playoffs
3	PC	The Town FC	28	13	4	4	7	41	28	+13	51	Qualification for the Playoffs
4	PC	Tacoma Defiance	28	13	2	3	10	59	53	+6	46	Qualification for the Playoffs
5	PC	Los Angeles FC 2	28	12	3	3	10	51	54	−3	45	Qualification for the Playoffs
6	PC	Ventura County FC	28	8	8	3	9	49	49	0	43	Qualification for the Playoffs
7	PC	Whitecaps FC 2	28	10	3	4	11	45	44	+1	40	Qualification for the Playoffs
8	FR	Houston Dynamo 2	28	10	2	5	11	46	45	+1	39	Qualification for the Playoffs
9	PC	Real Monarchs	28	9	5	2	12	39	41	−2	39	
10	FR	Sporting Kansas City II	28	10	2	4	12	53	57	−4	38	
11	PC	Portland Timbers 2	28	8	4	6	10	43	45	−2	38	
12	FR	Austin FC II	28	7	4	7	10	44	49	−5	36	
13	FR	Minnesota United FC 2	28	8	4	0	16	43	73	−30	32	
14	FR	Colorado Rapids 2	28	6	1	3	18	37	54	−17	23	

Source: MLSNP Western Conference
Rules for classification: 1) points; 2) total wins; 3) total goal differential; 4) total goals scored; 5) fewer disciplinary points; 6) away goal differential; 7) away goals scored; 8) home goals differential; 9) home goals scored; 10) coin toss (2 clubs tied) or drawing of lots (≥3 clubs tied)

==== Overall table ====
Pos	Team	Pld	W	SOW	SOL	L	GF	GA	GD	Pts	Awards
1	North Texas SC	28	16	6	2	4	56	32	+24	62	Regular season champion
2	St. Louis City 2	28	17	1	3	7	53	35	+18	56	
3	FC Cincinnati 2	28	16	2	2	8	47	34	+13	54	
4	Philadelphia Union II	28	15	3	1	9	59	41	+18	52	
5	The Town FC	28	13	4	4	7	41	28	+13	51	
6	Inter Miami CF II	28	14	0	6	8	53	45	+8	48	
7	Chicago Fire FC II	28	11	5	4	8	51	51	0	47	
8	Tacoma Defiance	28	13	2	3	10	59	53	+6	46	
9	Orlando City B	28	11	4	5	8	53	42	+11	46	
10	Los Angeles FC 2	28	12	3	3	10	51	54	−3	45	
11	New York City FC II	28	11	3	6	8	58	46	+12	45	
12	Columbus Crew 2	28	11	4	4	9	53	47	+6	45	
13	Crown Legacy FC	28	11	5	2	10	51	46	+5	45	
14	Chattanooga FC	28	9	8	2	9	45	42	+3	45	
15	Carolina Core FC	28	12	3	1	12	39	45	−6	43	
16	Ventura County FC	28	8	8	3	9	49	49	0	43	
17	Whitecaps FC 2	28	10	3	4	11	45	44	+1	40	
18	New York Red Bulls II	28	10	4	2	12	56	61	−5	40	
19	Houston Dynamo 2	28	10	2	5	11	46	45	+1	39	
20	Real Monarchs	28	9	5	2	12	39	41	−2	39	
21	Sporting Kansas City II	28	10	2	4	12	53	57	−4	38	
22	Portland Timbers 2	28	8	4	6	10	43	45	−2	38	
23	Toronto FC II	28	10	1	5	12	44	51	−7	37	
24	Austin FC II	28	7	4	7	10	44	49	−5	36	
25	Minnesota United FC 2	28	8	4	0	16	43	73	−30	32	
26	Atlanta United 2	28	7	4	3	14	42	64	−22	32	
27	Huntsville City FC	28	8	0	5	15	39	53	−14	29	
28	Colorado Rapids 2	28	6	1	3	18	37	54	−17	23	
29	New England Revolution II	28	4	4	2	18	37	59	−22	22	

Source: MLSNP
Rules for classification: 1) points; 2) total wins; 3) total goal differential; 4) total goals scored; 5) fewer disciplinary points; 6) away goal differential; 7) away goals scored; 8) home goals differential; 9) home goals scored; 10) coin toss (2 clubs tied) or drawing of lots (≥3 clubs tied)

== Player statistics ==
As of October 6, 2024

=== Goals ===
Rank	Player	Club	Goals
1	(United States) David Poreba	Chicago Fire FC II	18
2	(United States) Mykhi Joyner	St. Louis City 2	16
3	(United States) Taylor Calheira	New York City FC II	14
4	(United States) Edward Davis	Philadelphia Union II	13
5	(Algeria) Mehdi Ouamri	Chattanooga FC	12
6	(Canada) Julian Altobelli	Toronto FC II	11
6	(Argentina) Facundo Canete	Carolina Core FC	11
6	(Canada) Kamron Habibullah	Sporting Kansas City II	11
6	(Ghana) Shak Mohammed	Orlando City B	11
10	(United States) Chris Aquino	Tacoma Defiance	10
10	(Brazil) Pedrinho	North Texas SC	10
10	(Jamaica) Tarik Scott	North Texas SC	10
10	(United States) Gabriel Segal	Houston Dynamo 2	10
10	(United States) Marlon Vargas	Colorado Rapids 2	10
10	(Indonesia) Adrian Wibowo	Los Angeles FC 2	10

=== Hat-tricks ===
Player	Team	Against	Score	Date
(Canada) Kamron Habibullah	Sporting Kansas City II	Colorado Rapids 2	3–5 (A)	April 7
(Trinidad and Tobago) Roald Mitchell	New York Red Bulls II	Chicago Fire FC II	5–5 (4–3 PK)(H)	April 13
(El Salvador) Harold Osorio	Chicago Fire FC II	New York Red Bulls II	5–5 (3–4 PK)(A)	April 13
(Panama) Carlos Harvey	Minnesota United FC 2	Portland Timbers 2	3–4 (A)	April 21
(Canada) Kamron Habibullah	Sporting Kansas City II	Minnesota United FC 2	4–1 (H)	April 28
(United States) Gerardo Valenzuela	FC Cincinnati 2	Philadelphia Union II	3–1 (H)	April 28
(United States) Tega Ikoba	Portland Timbers 2	Sporting Kansas City II	5–2 (H)	July 25
(Senegal) Ousmane Sylla	Houston Dynamo 2	Minnesota United FC 2	4–1 (H)	August 21
(Haiti) Woobens Pacius	Huntsville City FC	Atlanta United 2	3–6 (A)	September 15
(United States) Gerardo Valenzuela	FC Cincinnati 2	Orlando City B	3–1 (H)	October 6
(United States) Javier Hernandez	Los Angeles FC 2	Sporting Kansas City II	4–3 (A)	October 6

Notes

(H) – Home team
(A) – Away team

Scored four goals.

=== Assists ===
Rank	Player	Club	Assists
1	(United States) Diego Gonzalez	Houston Dynamo 2	10
1	(United States) Aron John	Crown Legacy FC	10
3	(Liberia) Jimmy Farkarlun	Austin FC II	9
3	(United States) Alex Freeman	Orlando City B	9
5	(United States) Taylor Gray	Chattanooga FC	8
5	(United States) CJ Olney	Philadelphia Union II	8
7	(United States) Jonathan Bolanos	Huntsville City FC	7
7	(Argentina) Facundo Canete	Carolina Core FC	7
7	(United States) Piero Elias	New York City FC II	7
7	(United States) Milo Garvanian	Chattanooga FC	7
7	(United States) Owen Presthus	Columbus Crew 2	7
7	(United States) Nykolas Sessock	Inter Miami CF II	7
7	(Japan) Yutaro Tsukada	Orlando City B	7

=== Clean sheets ===
Rank	Player	Club	Clean sheets
1	(Mexico) Emmanuel Ochoa	The Town FC	6
1	(United States) Michael Collodi	North Texas SC	6
1	(United States) Christian Olivares	St. Louis City SC 2	6
4	(Denmark) Marcus Alstrup	Austin FC II	5
5	(United States) Michael Collodi	North Texas SC	4
5	(United States) Christian Olivares	St. Louis City SC 2	4
7	(United States) Patrick Los	Chicago Fire FC II	3
7	(Canada) Max Anchor	Whitecaps FC 2	3
7	(United States) Alex Rando	New York City FC II	3
10	(United States) Alex Sutton	Carolina Core FC	3
10	(United States) Andrew Rick	Philadelphia Union II	3
10	(United States) Hunter Morse	FC Cincinnati 2	3
10	(United States) Owen Finnerty	Inter Miami CF II	3
10	(United States) Paul Walters	FC Cincinnati 2	3
10	(United States) Trey Muse	Portland Timbers 2	3
10	(United States) Cole Jensen	Inter Miami CF II	3
10	(United States) Clint Irwin	Minnesota United FC 2	3
10	(United States) William Mackay	Real Monarchs	3

== Playoffs ==
=== Bracket ===
Conference Quarterfinals; October 20	Conference Semifinals; October 26–27
E3	Inter Miami CF II	2
E7	Columbus Crew 2	6
E7	Columbus Crew 2	3
E4	Chicago Fire FC II	2
E4	Chicago Fire FC II (p)	1 (5)
E5	Orlando City B	1 (4)
Eastern Conference
E1	FC Cincinnati 2	1
E8	Crown Legacy FC	2
E8	Crown Legacy FC	1 (3)
E2	Philadelphia Union II (p)	1 (4)
E2	Philadelphia Union II	1
E6	New York City FC II	0
W1	North Texas SC	3
W7	Vancouver Whitecaps 2	2
W1	North Texas SC	4
W4	Tacoma Defiance	1
W4	Tacoma Defiance	4
W6	Ventura County FC	0
Western Conference
W3	The Town FC	2
W8	Houston Dynamo 2	1
W3	The Town FC	2
W2	St. Louis City 2 (a.e.t.)	4
W2	St. Louis City 2	2
W5	Los Angeles FC 2	1

Conference Finals; November 2
E7	Columbus Crew 2	0
E2	Philadelphia Union II	4
W1	North Texas SC (a.e.t.)	3
W2	St. Louis City 2	0

MLS Next Pro Final; November 9
E2	Philadelphia Union II	2
W1	North Texas SC	3

=== Conference Quarterfinals ===
==== Eastern Conference ====
October 20
2:00 PM CDT

Chicago Fire FC II	1–1 (a.e.t.)	Orlando City B
Poreba (yellow card) 25' (goal) 45+1'; Reynolds (yellow card) 85'; Shokalook (yellow card) 90+3'; Soudan (yellow card) 90+4'; Koffi (yellow card) 101'	Report	Lynn 23'; Petrasso (yellow card) 38'; Guske (yellow card) 56'; Rivera (yellow card) 104'; Mercado (yellow card) 119'
Penalties
Poreba (penalty scored); Osorio (penalty scored); Soudan (penalty scored); Hlyut (penalty scored); Diouf (penalty scored)	5–4	(penalty scored) Freeman; (penalty scored) Banguero; (penalty scored) Rivera; (penalty scored) Reid-Brown; (penalty missed) Loyola

SeatGeek Stadium, Bridgeview, Illinois
Referee: Jeremy Scheer

October 20
5:00 PM EDT

Philadelphia Union II	1–0	New York City FC II
Olney 86'; LeBlanc (yellow card) 87'; Westfield (yellow card) 89'	Report

Subaru Park, Chester, Pennsylvania
Attendance: 2,748
Referee: Nabil Bensalah

October 20
7:00 PM EDT

FC Cincinnati 2	1–2	Crown Legacy FC
Schaefer (yellow card) 34'; Chirilă 79'	Report	Sangoquiza 84'; Smalls 90+1' (yellow card) 90+6'

NKU Soccer Stadium, Highland Heights, Kentucky
Attendance: 1,000
Referee: JC Griggs

October 20
7:00 PM EDT

Inter Miami CF II	2–6	Columbus Crew 2
Ferraina (yellow card) 34'; Cohen 40'; Casas (yellow card) 49'; Zeltzer-Zubida 78'	Report	Adams 24'; Da 30'; Sessock 45+1' (o.g.); Adu-Gyamfi 58'; Alaouieh 90+3'; Rayo 90+5' (yellow card) 90+7'

Chase Stadium, Fort Lauderdale, Florida
Referee: Elvis Osmanovic

==== Western Conference ====
October 20
2:00 PM CDT

St. Louis City 2	2–1	Los Angeles FC 2
Kijima (yellow card) 48'; McSorley 63' (yellow card) 90+6'; Reid (yellow card) 71'; Joyner 90+3'	Report	Sullivan 18'; Evans (yellow card) 74'; Orellana (yellow card) 78'; Ochoa (yellow card) 86'; Jaime (yellow card) 89'; Nielsen (yellow card) 90+6'

CityPark, St. Louis, Missouri
Referee: Joshua Encarnacion

October 20
3:00 PM PDT

The Town FC	2–1	Houston Dynamo 2
Walls (yellow card) 8'; Leroux 29'; Richmond (yellow card) 32'; Medina (yellow card) 58'; Blancas (yellow card) 63'; Garcia 82'	Report	Dimareli 41'; Mwakutuya (yellow card) 56'; Rodriguez (yellow card) 70'; Arzú (yellow card) 74'

Saint Mary's Stadium, Moraga, California
Referee: Muhammad Hassan

October 20
7:30 PM CDT

North Texas SC	3–2	Whitecaps FC 2
Endeley 8'; García 29'; Pondeca (yellow card) 79' (goal) 85'	Report	Goldthorp 65', 74'

Choctaw Stadium, Arlington, Texas
Attendance: 1,693
Referee: Lorenzo Hernandez

October 20
7:00 PM PDT

Tacoma Defiance	4–0	Ventura County FC
Brunell 7' (yellow card) 45+2'; Gomez 23'; Miglietti 39', 62'; Sousa (yellow card) 67'	Report	Paul (yellow card) 45+4'; Tarczynski-Miller (yellow card) 71'

Starfire Sports Complex, Tukwila, Washington
Referee: Alexandra Billeter

=== Conference Semifinals ===
==== Eastern Conference ====
October 26
5:00 PM EDT

Philadelphia Union II	1–1 (a.e.t.)	Crown Legacy FC
Makhanya 28'; Wetzel (yellow card) 30'; Sullivan (yellow card) 32'; Vazquez (yellow card) 43'; Westfield (yellow card) 53'	Report	Bravo (yellow card) 43'; Sing 88'; Mirkovic (yellow card) 120'
Penalties
Westfield (penalty scored); Pariano (penalty missed); Makhanya (penalty scored); Olivas (penalty scored); Olney (penalty scored)	4–3	(penalty scored) Nyandjo; (penalty scored) Mirkovic; (penalty missed) Bravo; (penalty scored) Rodrigues; (penalty missed) Smalls

Subaru Park, Chester, Pennsylvania
Attendance: 1,943
Referee: Abdou Ndiaye

October 27
2:00 PM EDT

Chicago Fire FC II	2–3	Columbus Crew 2
Reynolds (yellow card) 24'; Prpa 41'; Poreba 53' (pen.); Konincks (yellow card) 68'	Report	Rayo 30'; González (yellow card) 36'; Da 43'; Greene (yellow card) 52'; Zengue 57'

SeatGeek Stadium, Bridgeview, Illinois
Referee: Nabil Bensalah

==== Western Conference ====
October 26
8:30 PM EDT

North Texas SC	4–1	Tacoma Defiance
Pedrinho 20'; Farrington 48'; Sainté 66'; Rose (red card) 69'; Ramirez 77'	Report	Aquino 18'; Lopez (yellow card) 57' (yellow-red card) 75'

Choctaw Stadium, Arlington, Texas
Attendance: 1,744
Referee: Gerald Flores

October 27
4:00 PM CDT

St. Louis City 2	4–2 (a.e.t.)	The Town FC
McSorley 7'; Mikina 73' (yellow card) 112'; Joyner 103'; Olivares (yellow card) 120+2'; Kidd 120+3'	Report	Eisner (yellow card) 22'; Ricketts 28'; Mendoza (yellow card) 53'; Walls (yellow card) 56'; Lynch 67'; Garcia (yellow card) 96' (yellow-red card) 117'; Edwards (yellow card) 115'

CityPark, St. Louis, Missouri
Referee: Brad Jensen

=== Conference Finals ===
==== Eastern Conference ====
November 2
6:00 PM EDT

Philadelphia Union II	4–0	Columbus Crew 2
Anderson 16', 74'; Sullivan 42' (yellow card) 43'; Westfield 59'; Pariano (yellow card) 80'		González (yellow card) 60'; Pearson (yellow card) 67'

Subaru Park, Chester, Pennsylvania
Attendance: 4,727
Referee: Eric Tattersall

==== Western Conference ====
November 2
8:30 PM EDT

North Texas SC	3–0 (a.e.t.)	St. Louis City 2
Scott (yellow card) 38'; Norris (yellow card); Endeley (yellow card) 90'; Ramirez 105+1'; Pedrinho 108' (pen.); Zanne (yellow card) 110'; Henry-Scott 120'	Report	McSorley (yellow card) 35'; Kidd (yellow card) 40'; Antwi (yellow card) 54'; Wentzel (yellow card) 74'

Choctaw Stadium, Arlington, Texas
Attendance: 2,397
Referee: Elijio Arreguin

=== 2024 MLS Next Pro Cup Final ===
November 9
8:30 PM EST

North Texas SC	3–2	Philadelphia Union II
Farrington 51'; Pedrinho (yellow card) 52' (goal) 90+1'; Endeley (yellow card) 56'; Sali (yellow card) 59' (goal) 67'	Report	Anderson 9'; Davis 18'; Westfield (yellow card) 47'; Makhanya (red card) 75'

Toyota Stadium, Frisco, Texas
Attendance: 7,692
Referee: Joshua Encarnacion

Most Valuable Player: (United States) Herbert Endeley (North Texas SC)

== League awards ==
=== Individual awards ===
Award	Winner	Team	Reason	Ref.
Golden Boot	(United States) David Poreba	Chicago Fire FC II	18 goals	
Goalkeeper of the Year	(United States) Michael Collodi	North Texas SC	6 clean sheets; 73.1% save percentage	
Coach of the Year	(Jamaica) Tyrone Marshall	FC Cincinnati 2	Lead team to the Eastern Conference title	
Most Valuable Player	(United States) David Poreba	Chicago Fire FC II	Golden Boot winner and Best XI team	

=== MLS Next Pro Best XI ===
Goalkeeper	Defenders	Midfielders	Forwards	Ref
(United States) Michael Collodi (NTX) (Goalkeeper of the Year)	(Montserrat) Nico Gordon (NTX) (United States) Michael Wentzel (STL) (United States) Francis Westfield (PU2)	(United States) Diego Gonzalez (HD2) (United States) Aron John (CRN) (United States) CJ Olney (PU2) (United States) David Poreba (CHI) (Golden Boot and MVP)	(United States) Taylor Calheira (NY2) (United States) Mykhi Joyner (STL) (Algeria) Mehdi Ouamri (CFC)	

=== MLS Next Pro Match Officials of the Year ===
Referee	Assistant Referee	Fourth Official	Ref.
Joshua Encarnacion	Jackson Krauser	Braeden Frey	

=== Monthly awards ===
Week	Player of the Month		Rising Star of the Month		Goalkeeper of the Month		Coach of the Month		Team of the Month	Ref.
Week	Player	Club	Player	Club	Player	Club	Player	Club	Team of the Month	Ref.
March	(Uganda) Ibrahim Kasule	New York Red Bulls II	(United States) Riley Dalgado (United States) Eddy Davis	Ventura County FC Philadelphia Union II	(United States) Patrick Los	Chicago Fire FC II	(United States) Matt Taylor	Ventura County FC	Ventura County FC	
April	(Canada) Kamron Habibullah	Sporting Kansas City II	(United States) Eddy Davis	Philadelphia Union II	(United States) Brady Scott	Ventura County FC	(United States) Benny Feilhaber	Sporting Kansas City II	Chattanooga FC	
May	(Japan) Yutaro Tsukada	Orlando City B	(Romania) Ștefan Chirilă	FC Cincinnati 2	(United States) Michael Collodi	North Texas SC	(Jamaica) Tyrone Marshall	FC Cincinnati 2	Philadelphia Union II	
June	(England) Eliot Goldthorp	Whitecaps FC 2	(United States) Aron John	Crown Legacy FC	(United States) Patrick Los	Chicago Fire FC II	(United States) Ricardo Clark	Whitecaps FC 2	St. Louis City 2	
July	(United States) Diego Gonzalez	Houston Dynamo 2	(United States) Chase Adams	Columbus Crew 2	(United States) David Sweeney	The Town FC	(England) Matt Pilkington	New York City FC II	New York City FC II	
August	(Argentina) Facundo Canete	Carolina Core FC	(United States) Owen Anderson	Real Monarchs	(Belarus) Stanislav Lapkes (United States) Alex Sutton	Columbus Crew 2 Carolina Core FC	(United States) Roy Lassiter	Carolina Core FC	Carolina Core FC	
September	(United States) Alex Freeman	Orlando City B	(United States) Eddy Davis	Philadelphia Union II	(Mexico) Emi Ochoa	The Town FC	(Brazil) Michel	North Texas SC	Orlando City B	

=== Weekly awards ===
Week	Player of the Matchweek		Rising Star of the Matchweek		Goal of the Matchweek		Team of the Matchweek	Ref.
Week	Player	Club	Player	Club	Player	Club	Team of the Matchweek	Ref.
1	(Germany) Luis Müller	Los Angeles FC 2	(United States) Riley Dalgado	Ventura County FC	(Guyana) Omari Glasgow	Chicago Fire FC II	Tacoma Defiance	
2	(Uganda) Ibrahim Kasule	New York Red Bulls II	(United States) Justin Ellis	Orlando City B	(United States) Jesus Ibarra	Chattanooga FC	Ventura County FC	
3	(United States) Ruben Ramos Jr.	Ventura County FC	(United States) Eddy Davis	Philadelphia Union II	(United States) CJ Fodrey	Austin FC II	New York Red Bulls II	
4	(Canada) Kamron Habibullah	Sporting Kansas City II	(United States) Mohamed Saad	Columbus Crew 2	(Northern Ireland) Ryan Carmichael	Inter Miami CF II	Sporting Kansas City II	
5	(Trinidad and Tobago) Roald Mitchell	New York Red Bulls II	(United States) Frankie Westfield	Philadelphia Union II	(United States) Kyle Tucker	Philadelphia Union II	Chattanooga FC	
6	(Panama) Carlos Harvey	Minnesota United FC 2	(United States) Eddy Davis	Philadelphia Union II	(Cameroon) Ascel Essengue	Ventura County FC	North Texas SC	
7	(Canada) Kamron Habibullah	Sporting Kansas City II	(United States) Erik Hernandez	Ventura County FC	(United States) Gerardo Valenzuela	FC Cincinnati 2	Crown Legacy FC	
8	(Philippines) Alex Monis	New England Revolution II	(United States) Mykhi Joyner	St. Louis City 2	(Malaysia) Wan Kuzain	St. Louis City 2	North Texas SC	
9	(United States) Beto Avila	Sporting Kansas City II	(Romania) Ștefan Chirilă	FC Cincinnati 2	(Malaysia) Wan Kuzain	St. Louis City 2	Portland Timbers 2	
10	(United States) Chris Donovan	Philadelphia Union II	(Romania) Ștefan Chirilă	FC Cincinnati 2	(United States) Gibran Rayo	Columbus Crew 2	Crown Legacy FC	
11	(Japan) Yutaro Tsukada	Orlando City B	(United States) Maddox Findlay	Houston Dynamo 2	(United States) David Vazquez	Philadelphia Union II	Philadelphia Union II	
12	(United States) Sebastian Cruz	Sporting Kansas City II	(United States) Aron John	Crown Legacy FC	(Algeria) Mehdi Ouamri	Chattanooga FC	North Texas SC	
13	(United States) Jonathan Bolanos	Huntsville City FC	(United States) Chase Adams	Columbus Crew 2	(United States) Patrick Leal	New England Revolution II	FC Cincinnati 2	
14	(United States) Taylor Calheira	NYCFC II	(United States) Yuval Cohen	Inter Miami CF II	(Brazil) Maciel	New England Revolution II	Real Monarchs	
15	(Honduras) Antony Garcia	Colorado Rapids 2	(United States) Mattheo Dimareli	Houston Dynamo 2	(United States) Erik Dueñas	Los Angeles FC 2	Whitecaps FC 2	
16	(United States) Eddy Davis	Philadelphia Union II	(United States) Javier Hernandez	Los Angeles FC 2	(United States) Isaiah Reid	Houston Dynamo 2	Tacoma Defiance	
17	(United States) Julian Hall	New York Red Bulls II	(United States) Mykhi Joyner	St. Louis City 2	(United States) Cavan Sullivan	Philadelphia Union II	New York Red Bulls II	
18	(Honduras) Antony García	Colorado Rapids 2	(United States) Dominik Chong Qui	Atlanta United 2	(United States) Jathan Juarez	Carolina Core FC	Tacoma Defiance	
19	(United States) Diego Gonzalez	Houston Dynamo 2	(United States) Chase Adams	Columbus Crew 2	(United States) Eddy Berumen	Los Angeles FC 2	Houston Dynamo 2	
20	(United States) Tega Ikoba	Portland Timbers 2	(United States) Anthony Alaouieh	Columbus Crew 2	(Brazil) Leo Afonso	Inter Miami CF II	FC Cincinnati 2	
21	(United States) Brent Adu-Gyamfi	Columbus Crew 2	(United States) Jackson Platts	Orlando City B	(United States) Ben Stitz	FC Cincinnati 2	Colorado Rapids 2	
22	(United States) Leandro Soria	Philadelphia Union II	(United States) Owen Anderson	Real Monarchs	(Canada) Julian Altobelli	Toronto FC II	Los Angeles FC 2	
23	(Brazil) Pedrinho	North Texas SC	(United States) Kellan LeBlanc	Philadelphia Union II	(Mexico) Sebastian Rodriguez	Houston Dynamo 2	Carolina Core FC	
24	(Senegal) Ousmane Sylla	Houston Dynamo 2	(United States) Tristan Tropeano	Huntsville City FC	(United States) Cavan Sullivan	Philadelphia Union II	St. Louis City 2	
25	(Argentina) Facundo Canete	Carolina Core FC	(United States) William Mackay	Real Monarchs	(United States) Diego Abarca	Austin FC II	Carolina Core FC	
26	(United States) Alex Freeman	Orlando City B	(Costa Rica) Matias Wanchope	Los Angeles FC 2	(United States) Michael Wentzel	St. Louis City 2	Chattanooga FC	
27	(Haiti) Woobens Pacius	Huntsville City FC	(United States) Yuval Cohen	Inter Miami CF II	(Panama) Rafael Mosquera	New York Red Bulls II	Toronto FC II	
28	(United States) Alex Freeman	Orlando City B	(United States) Colton Swan	Colorado Rapids 2	(South Korea) Min-jae Kwak	Chattanooga FC	The Town FC	
29	(Mexico) Emi Ochoa	The Town FC	(United States) William Mackay	Real Monarchs	(United States) Brendan McSorley	St. Louis City 2	Chattanooga FC	
30	(United States) Gerardo Valenzuela	FC Cincinnati 2	(United States) Javier Hernandez	Los Angeles FC 2	(Brazil) Pedrinho	North Texas SC	North Texas SC	

=== Mid-Season Awards ===
Player of the Mid-Season		Rising Star of the Mid-Season		Goalkeeper of the Mid-Season		Coach of the Mid-Season		Team of the Mid-Season	Ref.
(Canada) Kamron Habibullah	Sporting KC II	(United States) MyKhi Joyner	St. Louis City SC 2	(United States) Michael Collodi	North Texas SC	(Jamaica) Tyrone Marshall	FC Cincinnati 2	Philadelphia Union II	

== See also ==
- 2024 Major League Soccer season
