= 2022 MLS Next Pro season =

1st season of MLS Next Pro

MLS Next Pro
- Season: 2022
- Dates: March 25 – September 18 (regular season); September 24 – October 8 (playoffs)
- Champions: Columbus Crew 2 (1st Title)
- Regular season title: Columbus Crew 2 (1st Title)
- Matches: 259 (252 RS, 7 PO)
- Goals: 882 (3.41 per match) (855 RS, 27 PO)
- Best player: (Canada) Jacen Russell-Rowe (Columbus Crew 2)
- Top goalscorer: (Canada) Jacen Russell-Rowe (Columbus Crew 2) (21 goals)
- Best goalkeeper: (United States) Patrick Schulte (Columbus Crew 2)
- Biggest home win: CC2 9–0 CIN (September 18)
- Biggest away win: CHI 0–5 STL (June 11)
- Highest scoring: CC2 9–0 CIN (September 18)
- Longest winning run: 7 PU2
- Longest losing run: 13 RLM
- Highest attendance: 7,446 CC2 4–1 STL
- All statistics correct as of September 18, 2022.

The 2022 MLS Next Pro season was the inaugural season of MLS Next Pro, the reserve league of Major League Soccer. It is the first season since 2014 where MLS had a standalone reserve league, the previous season being the MLS Reserve League. Including both MLS Next Pro and the MLS Reserve League, it is the ninth season of a reserve league operated by MLS. The league is sanctioned as a third division league by U.S. Soccer.

A total of 21 clubs, 20 MLS reserve teams and one independent team (Rochester New York FC) participated in the 2022 season. The regular season began on March 25 and was concluded on September 18, 2022.

Columbus Crew 2 defeated St. Louis City 2 4–1 in the inaugural MLS Next Pro Cup final on October 8.

== Teams ==
=== Stadiums and locations ===
Team	Stadium	Capacity
Chicago Fire FC II	SeatGeek Stadium	20,000
FC Cincinnati 2	NKU Soccer Stadium	1,000
Colorado Rapids 2	Denver Soccer Stadium	2,000
Columbus Crew 2	Historic Crew Stadium	19,968
Houston Dynamo 2	Aveva Stadium	4,000
Inter Miami CF II	DRV PNK Stadium	18,000
Minnesota United FC 2	Allianz Field	19,400
Minnesota United FC 2	National Sports Center	10,000
New England Revolution II	Gillette Stadium	20,000
New York City FC II	Belson Stadium	2,168
North Texas SC	Choctaw Stadium	48,114
Orlando City B	Osceola County Stadium	5,400
Philadelphia Union II	Subaru Park	18,500
Portland Timbers 2	Hillsboro Stadium	7,600
Real Monarchs	Zions Bank Stadium	5,000
Rochester New York FC	John L. DiMarco Field	1,500
San Jose Earthquakes II	PayPal Park	18,000
Sporting Kansas City II	Rock Chalk Park	2,500
Sporting Kansas City II	Swope Soccer Village	3,500
St. Louis City 2	Hermann Stadium	6,050
St. Louis City 2	Ralph Korte Stadium	4,000
Toronto FC II	York Lions Stadium	4,000
Tacoma Defiance	Cheney Stadium	6,500
Tacoma Defiance	Starfire Sports Complex	4,500
Whitecaps FC 2	Swangard Stadium	5,288

=== Personnel and sponsorship ===
Note: All teams use Adidas as universal kit manufacturer.

Team	Head coach
Chicago Fire FC II	(France) Ludovic Taillandier
FC Cincinnati 2	(United States) Tyrone Marshall
Colorado Rapids 2	(United States) Erik Bushey
Columbus Crew 2	(France) Laurent Courtois
Houston Dynamo 2	(United States) Kenny Bundy
Inter Miami CF II	(England) Darren Powell
Minnesota United FC 2	(New Zealand) Cameron Knowles
New England Revolution II	(United States) Clint Peay
New York City FC II	(United States) Matt Pilkington
North Texas SC	(Norway) Pa-Modou Kah
Orlando City B	(Argentina) Martín Perelman
Philadelphia Union II	(United States) Marlon LeBlanc
Portland Timbers 2	(Scotland) Shannon Murray
Real Monarchs	(Colombia) Jámison Olave
Rochester New York FC	(Portugal) Bruno Baltazar
San Jose Earthquakes II	(United States) Dan DeGeer (interim)
Sporting Kansas City II	(United States) Benny Feilhaber
St. Louis City 2	(United States) John Hackworth (interim)
Toronto FC II	(Canada) Gianni Cimini
Tacoma Defiance	(United States) Wade Webber
Whitecaps FC 2	(Canada) Nick Dasovic

== Regular season ==
The regular season will feature 24 matches in a mostly regionalized schedule. Teams will play two or three games against teams in their conference. Only four matches total will be played between teams in opposite conferences. Each conference will be divided into divisions of five or six teams for scheduling.

=== Conference standings ===
==== Eastern Conference ====
Pos	Div	Team	Pld	W	SOW	SOL	L	GF	GA	GD	Pts	Qualification
1	CT	Columbus Crew 2	24	16	2	3	3	62	22	+40	55	Qualification for the 2022 MLS Next Pro Playoffs
2	NE	Toronto FC II	24	12	2	1	9	44	38	+6	41	Qualification for the 2022 MLS Next Pro Playoffs
3	NE	Philadelphia Union II	24	11	3	1	9	42	39	+3	40	Qualification for the 2022 MLS Next Pro Playoffs
4	NE	Rochester New York FC	24	10	4	2	8	37	30	+7	40	Qualification for the 2022 MLS Next Pro Playoffs
5	NE	New York City FC II	24	9	4	2	9	49	35	+14	37	
6	CT	Inter Miami CF II	24	10	1	4	9	40	49	−9	36	
7	NE	New England Revolution II	24	9	1	4	10	27	42	−15	33	
8	CT	Chicago Fire FC II	24	8	2	3	11	41	44	−3	31	
9	CT	Orlando City B	24	6	2	3	13	40	53	−13	25	
10	CT	FC Cincinnati 2	24	4	2	1	17	27	65	−38	17	

Source: MLSNP Eastern Conference
Rules for classification: 1) points; 2) total wins; 3) total goal differential; 4) total goals scored; 5) fewer disciplinary points; 6) away goal differential; 7) away goals scored; 8) home goals differential; 9) home goals scored; 10) coin toss (2 clubs tied) or drawing of lots (≥3 clubs tied)

==== Western Conference ====
Pos	Div	Team	Pld	W	SOW	SOL	L	GF	GA	GD	Pts	Qualification
1	FR	St. Louis City 2	24	15	1	2	6	51	34	+17	49	Qualification for the 2022 MLS Next Pro Playoffs
2	PC	Tacoma Defiance	24	14	3	1	6	57	25	+32	49	Qualification for the 2022 MLS Next Pro Playoffs
3	FR	Houston Dynamo 2	24	14	2	3	5	38	22	+16	49	Qualification for the 2022 MLS Next Pro Playoffs
4	FR	North Texas SC	24	13	2	3	6	48	31	+17	46	Qualification for the 2022 MLS Next Pro Playoffs
5	PC	San Jose Earthquakes II	24	12	1	3	8	48	37	+11	41	
6	FR	Minnesota United FC 2	24	9	4	1	10	43	39	+4	36	
7	PC	Whitecaps FC 2	24	7	3	5	9	40	40	0	32	
8	FR	Sporting Kansas City II	24	9	1	2	12	31	38	−7	31	
9	FR	Colorado Rapids 2	24	7	4	2	11	33	56	−23	31	
10	PC	Real Monarchs	24	6	1	3	14	28	50	−22	23	
11	PC	Portland Timbers 2	24	2	4	0	18	29	66	−37	14	

Source: MLSNP Western Conference
Rules for classification: 1) points; 2) total wins; 3) total goal differential; 4) total goals scored; 5) fewer disciplinary points; 6) away goal differential; 7) away goals scored; 8) home goals differential; 9) home goals scored; 10) coin toss (2 clubs tied) or drawing of lots (≥3 clubs tied)

==== Overall table ====
Pos	Team	Pld	W	SOW	SOL	L	GF	GA	GD	Pts	Qualification
1	Columbus Crew 2	24	16	2	3	3	62	22	+40	55	Regular season champion
2	St. Louis City 2	24	15	1	2	6	51	34	+17	49	
3	Tacoma Defiance	24	14	3	1	6	57	25	+32	49	
4	Houston Dynamo 2	24	14	2	3	5	38	22	+16	49	
5	North Texas SC	24	13	2	3	6	48	31	+17	46	
6	San Jose Earthquakes II	24	12	1	3	8	48	37	+11	41	
7	Toronto FC II	24	12	2	1	9	44	38	+6	41	
8	Philadelphia Union II	24	11	3	1	9	42	39	+3	40	
9	Rochester New York FC	24	10	4	2	8	37	30	+7	40	
10	New York City FC II	24	9	4	2	9	49	35	+14	37	
11	Inter Miami CF II	24	10	1	4	9	40	49	−9	36	
12	Minnesota United FC 2	24	9	4	1	10	43	39	+4	36	
13	New England Revolution II	24	9	1	4	10	27	42	−15	33	
14	Whitecaps FC 2	24	7	3	5	9	40	40	0	32	
15	Sporting Kansas City II	24	9	1	2	12	31	38	−7	31	
16	Chicago Fire FC II	24	8	2	3	11	41	44	−3	31	
17	Colorado Rapids 2	24	7	4	2	11	33	56	−23	31	
18	Orlando City B	24	6	2	3	13	40	53	−13	25	
19	Real Monarchs	24	6	1	3	14	28	50	−22	23	
20	FC Cincinnati 2	24	4	2	1	17	27	65	−38	17	
21	Portland Timbers 2	24	2	4	0	18	29	66	−37	14	

Source: MLSNP
Rules for classification: 1) points; 2) total wins; 3) total goal differential; 4) total goals scored; 5) fewer disciplinary points; 6) away goal differential; 7) away goals scored; 8) home goals differential; 9) home goals scored; 10) coin toss (2 clubs tied) or drawing of lots (≥3 clubs tied)

== Player statistics ==
As of September 18, 2022

=== Goals ===
Rank	Player	Club	Goals
1	(Canada) Jacen Russell-Rowe	Columbus Crew 2	21
2	(United States) Bernard Kamungo	North Texas SC	16
3	(United States) Jack Lynn	Orlando City B	15
4	(Haiti) Shanyder Borgelin	Inter Miami CF II	14
4	(Honduras) John Denis	New York City FC II	14
6	(United States) Gibran Rayo	Rochester New York FC	13
7	(United States) Rudi Castro	San Jose Earthquakes II	12
7	(United States) Marlon Vargas	Tacoma Defiance	12
9	(United States) Aziel Jackson	Minnesota United FC 2	10
9	(Mexico) Jonathan Jimenez	New York City FC II	10

=== Hat-tricks ===
Player	For	Against	Score	Date
(United States) Beto Avila	Houston Dynamo 2	Sporting Kansas City II	0–3 (A)	April 10
(United States) Jack Lynn	Orlando City B	Inter Miami CF II	6–0 (H)	May 21
(United States) Joshua Penn	Chicago Fire FC II	Toronto FC II	2–6 (A)	May 27
(Ghana) Rauf Salifu	Sporting Kansas City II	North Texas SC	4–2 (H)	July 2
(United States) Gibran Rayo	Rochester New York FC	Philadelphia Union II	3–0 (H)	July 7
(Honduras) John Denis	New York City FC II	New England Revolution II	0–4 (A)	July 10
(United States) Victor Bezerra	Chicago Fire FC II	Orlando City B	3–4 (H)	July 17
(United States) Thomas Williamson	Minnesota United FC 2	Colorado Rapids 2	3–3 (H)	August 6
(Haiti) Shanyder Borgelin	Inter Miami II	New England Revolution II	4–2 (H)	August 7
(Canada) Jacen Russell-Rowe	Columbus Crew 2	FC Cincinnati II	9–0 (H)^{4}	September 18

Notes

(H) – Home team
(A) – Away team
4 – Scored 4 goals

=== Assists ===
Rank	Player	Club	Assists
1	(England) Romeo Beckham	Inter Miami CF II	10
1	(Algeria) Mohamed Farsi	Columbus Crew 2	10
3	(Ghana) Hope Avayevu	North Texas SC	9
4	(United States) Aziel Jackson	Minnesota United FC 2	7
4	(United States) Akil Watts	St. Louis City 2	7
4	(Morocco) El Mahdi Youssoufi	New York City FC II	7
7	(United States) Maximilian Arfsten	San Jose Earthquakes II	6
7	(United States) Selmir Miscic	Portland Timbers 2	6
7	(United States) Sergio Oregel	Chicago Fire FC II	6
7	(United States) Marlon Vargas	Tacoma Defiance	6

=== Clean sheets ===
Rank	Player	Club	Clean sheets
1	(Brazil) Caíque	Rochester New York FC	8
2	(United States) Patrick Schulte	Columbus Crew 2	7
3	(Dominican Republic) Xavier Valdez	Houston Dynamo 2	6
4	(United States) Chris Brady	Chicago Fire FC II	5
4	(Canada) Luka Gavran	Toronto FC II	5
4	(United States) Jacob Jackson	New England Revolution II	5
4	(United States) Alex Rando	New York City FC II	5
4	(United States) Brady Scott	Columbus Crew 2	5
9	(United States) Antonio Carrera	North Texas SC	4
9	(United States) Wallis Lapsley	Tacoma Defiance	4
9	(Venezuela) Javier Otero	Orlando City B	4

== Playoffs ==
There was an eight-team playoff, where the top finisher in each division qualified, along with the next two top finishers in each conference. Seeding within each conference was based on conference standings, regardless of being division champions.

=== Qualifying teams ===
Eastern Conference

- Columbus Crew 2 - Central Division Winner
- Toronto FC II - Northeast Division Winner
- Philadelphia Union II - Conference Wild Card #1
- Rochester New York FC - Conference Wild Card #2

Western Conference

- St. Louis City 2 - Frontier Division Winner
- Tacoma Defiance - Pacific Division Winner
- Houston Dynamo 2 - Conference Wild Card #1
- North Texas SC - Conference Wild Card #2

=== Bracket ===
Conference Semifinals
E1	Columbus Crew 2	4
E4	Rochester New York FC	1
Eastern Conference
E2	Toronto FC II	1
E3	Philadelphia Union II	0
W1	St. Louis City 2	2
W4	North Texas SC	0
Western Conference
W2	Tacoma Defiance (p)	2 (5)
W3	Houston Dynamo 2	2 (4)

Conference Finals
E1	Columbus Crew 2 (a.e.t.)	4
E2	Toronto FC II	3
W1	St. Louis City 2	2
W2	Tacoma Defiance	1

2022 MLS Next Pro Cup
E1	Columbus Crew 2	4
W1	St. Louis City 2	1

=== Conference Semifinals ===
==== Eastern Conference ====
September 24
12:00 PM EDT

Columbus Crew 2	4–1	Rochester New York FC
Parente (yellow card) 36'; Malou (yellow card) 40'; Russell-Rowe 44', 83', 85'; Micaletto 50' (yellow card) 53'	Report	Lopez (yellow card) 5'; Edwards (yellow card) 40'; Akanyirige (yellow card) 49'; Dolabella (yellow card) 52'; Brigida 90+2'

Historic Crew Stadium, Columbus, Ohio
Attendance: 1,147
Referee: Samantha Martinez

September 24
4:00 PM EDT

Toronto FC II	1–0	Philadelphia Union II
Mbongue 6'	Report	Sorenson (yellow card) 33'; Villero (yellow card) 39'; Turner (yellow card) 81'; Paternina (yellow card) 85'

BMO Field, Toronto, Ontario
Referee: Michael Venne

==== Western Conference ====
September 25
6:30 PM CDT

St. Louis City 2	2–0	North Texas SC
Yaro (yellow card) 41'; Ostrák 73'; Schneider (yellow card) 75'; Di Rosa (yellow card) 84'; Pompeu 90+1' (pen.)	Report	Sainté (yellow card) 39'; Scott (yellow card) 71'; Bartlett (yellow card) 90+1'

Ralph Korte Stadium, Edwardsville, Illinois
Referee: Ricardo Fierro

September 25
7:30 PM PDT

Tacoma Defiance	2–2 (a.e.t.)	Houston Dynamo 2
Ocampo-Chavez (yellow card) 10'; Robin (yellow card) 14'; Hafferty (yellow card) 76'; Vargas 84' (pen.); Lima 90+4' (o.g.)	Report	Raines (yellow card) 6'; Murana (yellow card) 32'; Avila 40' (yellow card) 52'; Evans 50'; Micael (yellow card) 83'; Juarez (yellow card) 90+2'
Penalties
Vargas (penalty scored); Uderitz (penalty scored); Sabella (penalty scored); Sousa (penalty scored); Robin (penalty scored)	5–4	(penalty scored) Gonzalez; (penalty scored) Ríos; (penalty scored) Palomino; (penalty missed) Lima; (penalty scored) Edwards

Starfire Sports Complex, Tukwila, Washington
Referee: Thomas Snyder

=== Conference Finals ===
==== Eastern Conference ====
October 2
5:00 PM EDT

Columbus Crew 2	4–3 (a.e.t.)	Toronto FC II
Fuson 32'; Parente 60' (pen.) (yellow card) 79'; Zawadzki (yellow card) 67'; Mohamed (yellow card) 99'; Micaletto (yellow card) 106'; Knight 109'; Gannon 119'	Report	Rothrock (yellow card) 20' (goal) 47'; Mbongue (yellow card) 44'; Antonoglou 90+3', 94'; Altobelli (yellow card) 105+2'

Historic Crew Stadium, Columbus, Ohio
Referee: Sergii Demianchuk

==== Western Conference ====
October 2
7:30 PM CDT

St. Louis City 2	2–1	Tacoma Defiance
Ostrák 31'; Yaro (yellow card) 58'; Dolling 59'; Watts (yellow card) 70'	Report	Cissoko 76' (pen.); Uderitz (yellow card) 90+2'

Ralph Korte Stadium, Edwardsville, Illinois
Attendance: 2,413
Referee: Elton Garcia

== 2022 MLS Next Pro Cup ==
October 8
1:30 PM EDT

Columbus Crew 2	4–1	St. Louis City 2
Malou (yellow card) 41'; Parente 45' (pen.); Micaletto 45+3'; Russell-Rowe 58' (pen.); Telfer 83'	Report	Pompeu 80'; Yaro (yellow card) 89'

Lower.com Field, Columbus, Ohio
Attendance: 7,446
Referee: Malik Badawi

Most Valuable Player: (Italy) Marco Micaletto (Columbus Crew 2)

== League awards ==
=== Individual awards ===
Award	Winner	Team	Reason	Ref.
Golden Boot	(Canada) Jacen Russell-Rowe	Columbus Crew 2	21 goals	
Goalkeeper of the Year	(United States) Patrick Schulte	Columbus Crew 2	1.00 goals against average; 10 wins; 7 clean sheets	
Coach of the Year	(France) Laurent Courtois	Columbus Crew 2	Won regular season title	
Goal of the Year	(Brazil) Ryan Lima	New England Revolution II	vs FC Cincinnati 2	
Save of the Year	(United States) Antonio Carrera	North Texas SC	vs Houston Dynamo 2	
Most Valuable Player	(Canada) Jacen Russell-Rowe	Columbus Crew 2	21 goals in 19 starts; 5 assists; 5 multi-goal games	

=== MLS Next Pro Best XI ===
Goalkeeper	Defenders	Midfielders	Forwards	Ref
(United States) Patrick Schulte (CC2) (Goalkeeper of the Year)	(Algeria) Mohamed Farsi (CC2) (Canada) Kyle Hiebert (STL) (United States) Talen Maples (HD2)	(Brazil) Pedro Dolabella (RNY) (United States) Aziel Jackson (MU2) (United States) Isaiah Parente (CC2) (United States) Marlon Vargas (TAC)	(United States) Bernard Kamungo (NTX) (United States) Jack Lynn (OCB) (Canada) Jacen Russell-Rowe (CC2) (Golden Boot and MVP)	

=== Monthly awards ===
Month	Player of the Month			Team of the Month	Coach of the Month		Goalkeeper of the Month		Ref.
Month	Player	Club	Position	Club	Player	Club	Keeper	Club	Ref.
March/April	(United States) Alfonso Ocampo-Chavez	Tacoma Defiance	Forward	Houston Dynamo 2	(United States) Kenny Bundy	Houston Dynamo 2	(Venezuela) Javier Otero	Orlando City B	
May	(Canada) Jacen Russell-Rowe	Columbus Crew 2	Midfielder	Rochester New York FC	(Portugal) Bruno Baltazar	Rochester New York FC	(United States) Jacob Jackson	New England Revolution II	
June	(Canada) Jacen Russell-Rowe	Columbus Crew 2	Midfielder	St. Louis City 2	(United States) John Hackworth	St. Louis City 2	(Brazil) Caíque	Rochester New York FC	
July	(Honduras) John Denis	New York City FC II	Midfielder	Tacoma Defiance	(United States) Wade Webber	Tacoma Defiance	(Canada) Luka Gavran	Toronto FC II	
August	(Brazil) Klauss	St. Louis City 2	Forward	St. Louis City 2	(United States) John Hackworth	St. Louis City 2	(United States) Patrick Schulte	Columbus Crew 2	

== See also ==
- 2022 Major League Soccer season
