= Samuel Owusu (footballer, born 2000) =

Ghanaian footballer (born 2000)

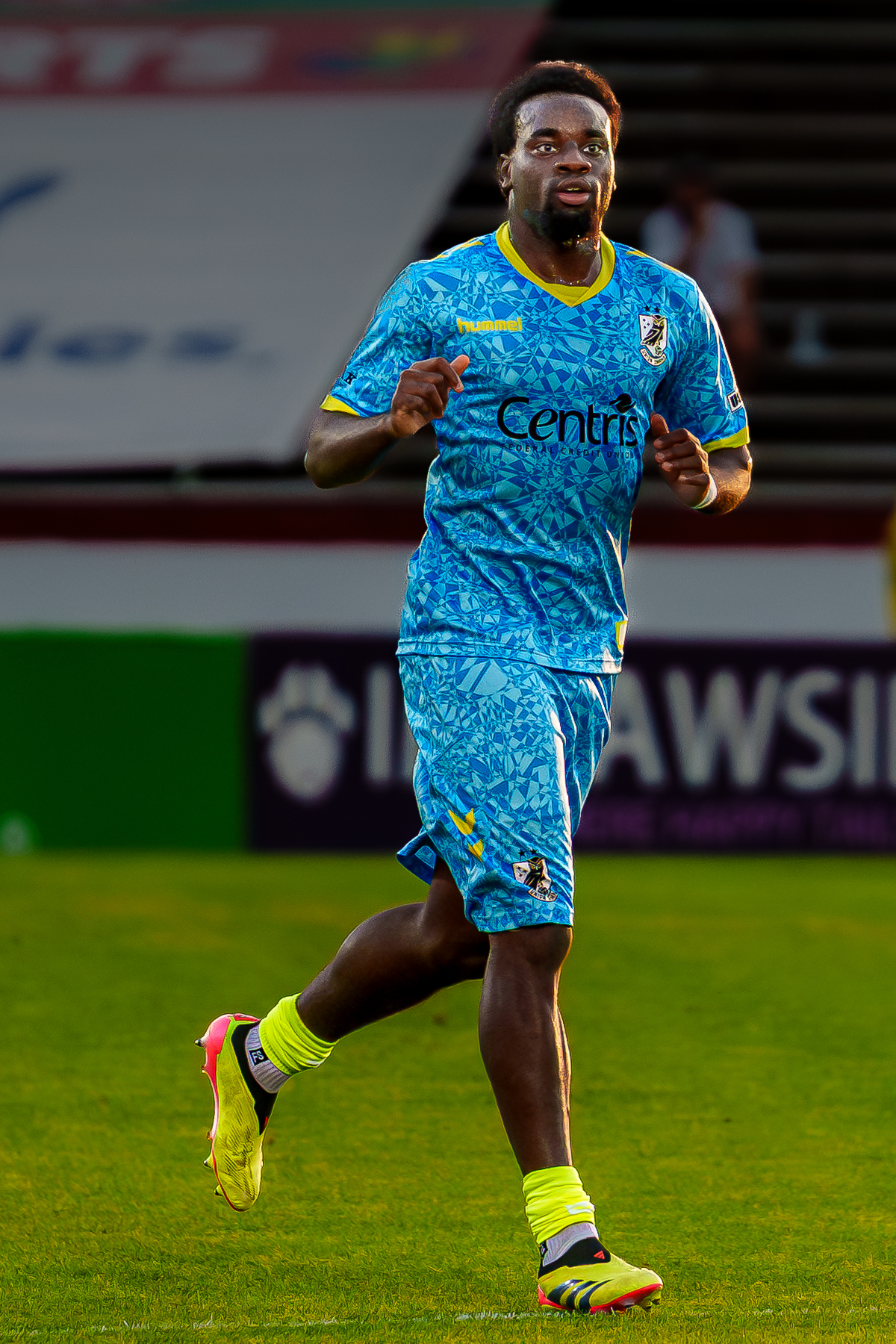
- Owusu with Union Omaha in 2026

Personal information
- Full name: Samuel Afriyie Owusu
- Date of birth: December 13, 2000 (age 25)
- Place of birth: Kumasi, Ghana
- Height: 1.88 m (6 ft 2 in)
- Position: Defender

Team information
- Current team: Union Omaha
- Number: 4

Youth career
- 2016–2022: New York City FC

Senior career*
Years	Team	Apps	(Gls)
2022–2023	New York City FC	1	(0)
2022–2024	New York City FC II	64	(4)
2025–	Union Omaha	59	(3)
- * Club domestic league appearances and goals as of October 31, 2026

Samuel Afriyie "Kwaku" Owusu (born December 13, 2000) is a Ghanaian footballer who plays for Union Omaha in the USL League One.

== Playing career ==
=== Youth ===
Owusu joined MLS club in 2016, entering their academy at the U15 level and working his way through several age categories. With them, he won the Generation Adidas Cup in 2016 and the U.S. Soccer Development Academy national championship in 2018 and 2019.

=== Professional ===
On January 19, 2022, Owusu signed his first professional contract with New York City FC. The club announced that he would be made available for the club's new development side, New York City FC II, playing in the first season of MLS Next Pro.

On March 28, 2025, Owusu signed with USL League One side Union Omaha.

== Career statistics ==
As of match played April 3, 2022.

Appearances and goals by club, season and competition
Club	Season	League			Cup (Note: Includes the U.S. Open Cup)		Continental		Total	
Club	Season	Division	Apps	Goals	Apps	Goals	Apps	Goals	Apps	Goals
New York City FC II	2022	MLS Next Pro	1	0	—		—		1	0
Career total			1	0	0	0	0	0	1	0
