= Jack Beer =

American soccer player (born 1999)

Personal information
- Date of birth: June 15, 1999 (age 27)
- Place of birth: Thornwood, New York, United States
- Position: Midfielder

Team information
- Current team: Auckland United
- Number: 10

Youth career
- –2017: New York Soccer Club

College career
Years	Team	Apps	(Gls)
2017–2020	Georgetown Hoyas	44	(4)

Senior career*
Years	Team	Apps	(Gls)
2021–2022	Lansdowne Yonkers FC		
2022–2023	New York City FC II	44	(7)
2024–2025	Mérida	8	(0)
2025	Lexington SC	3	(0)
2026–	Auckland United	9	(3)
- * Club domestic league appearances and goals as of 9 May 2026

Jack Beer (born June 15, 1999) is an American professional soccer player, who plays for National League club Auckland United.

== Playing career ==
=== Youth ===
Beer spent a number of years with local team New York Soccer Club, where his team won the NPL National Championship in both 2015 and 2016, and several other competitions. He also set the club record for the most goals scored in a single season, while playing in the u-13/14 category.

=== College ===
In 2017, Beer attended Georgetown University to play college soccer. In the 2017 season he played 20 games, scoring once, while in the 2019 season he scored twice in 24 games.

=== Senior ===
After leaving college, Beer played for Lansdowne Yonkers FC. He featured for them in their 2021–2022 season, during a spell in which the club would sustain an unbeaten run lasting more than 15 months and would win a number of trophies, including the 2021 National Amateur Cup.

On March 24, 2022, it was announced that Beer had signed with MLS Next Pro side New York City FC II ahead of the league's inaugural season. His competitive professional debut came in a loss on penalties against New England Revolution II on March 27, 2022. He scored his first goal as a professional in a 3–1 loss against Toronto FC II two weeks later.

On August 6, 2024, Beer signed with Mérida in the Spanish third-tier Primera Federación. On 4 March 2025, Beer departed the club by mutual consent.

On 6 March 2025, Beer joined USL Championship club Lexington SC on a twenty-five day contract.

== Career statistics ==
As of match played April 23, 2022.

Appearances and goals by club, season and competition
Club	Season	League			Cup (Note: Includes the US Open Cup)		Continental		Total	
Club	Season	Division	Apps	Goals	Apps	Goals	Apps	Goals	Apps	Goals
New York City FC II	2022	MLS Next Pro	4	2	—		—		4	2
Career total			4	2	0	0	0	0	4	2
