= Piero Elias =

American soccer player (born 2002)

Personal information
- Full name: Piero Elias
- Date of birth: September 8, 2002 (age 24)
- Place of birth: New York City, New York, USA
- Height: 1.74 m (5 ft 8 1/2 in)
- Position: Midfielder

Team information
- Current team: Westchester SC
- Number: 24

Youth career
- –2015: Metropolitan Oval
- 2016–2017: New York City FC
- 2018–2019: Blau-Weiss Gottschee
- 2019–2020: Metropolitan Oval
- 2021–2022: Queensboro FC

Senior career*
Years	Team	Apps	(Gls)
2022–2025	New York City FC II	22	(2)
2026	Sporting JAX	0	(0)
2026–	Westchester SC	6	(2)
- * Club domestic league appearances and goals as of September 20, 2026

Piero Elias (born September 8, 2002) is an American soccer player who plays for Westchester SC in USL League One.

== Playing career ==
=== Youth ===
Piero Elias' teenage career saw him transfer between youth academies on several occasions. In 2015, he played at the development academy at Metropolitan Oval before transferring to New York City FC where he played in their under-14 program. In 2018–19 he played with Blau-Weiss Gottschee's under-16s, and then returned to Met Oval to be part of their under-18 side in 2019. In 2021 he switched to the Queensboro FC development academy, in the USL Academy League.

=== New York City FC II ===
On March 24, 2022, Elias was announced as an inaugural season signing for MLS Next Pro club New York City FC II, signing his first full professional contract. His competitive debut came in the first game of the season in a loss on penalties to New England Revolution II on March 27. His first start came in the following game, another shootout loss to Orlando City B on April 3.

=== Sporting JAX ===
On January 17, 2026, via the club's YouTube channel, Sporting Club Jacksonville, better known as Sporting JAX, announced the addition of Elias to the team's inaugural USL Championship roster.

== International career ==
In 2019 Elias was called up to the Peru under-17 team to take part in a training camp. The following year he was called up to a training camp with their under-20 team. He has yet to make an appearance for Peru at any level, however.

== Career statistics ==
As of match played May 6, 2022.

Appearances and goals by club, season and competition
Club	Season	League			Cup (Note: Includes the US Open Cup)		Continental		Total	
Club	Season	Division	Apps	Goals	Apps	Goals	Apps	Goals	Apps	Goals
New York City FC II	2022	MLS Next Pro	6	0	—		—		6	0
Career total			6	0	0	0	0	0	6	0
