= David Poreba =

American soccer player (born 2002)

Personal information
- Date of birth: December 1, 2002 (age 23)
- Place of birth: Chicago, Illinois, U.S.
- Height: 6 ft 0 in (1.82 m)
- Position: Midfielder

Team information
- Current team: Chicago Fire
- Number: 29

Youth career
- 2010–2013: Chicago Magic PNA
- 2013–2016: Chicago Fire
- 2016–2021: Chicago FC United
- 2021–2022: Stal Mielec

Senior career*
| Years | Team | Apps | (Gls) |
| 2022–2024 | Stal Mielec | 2 | (0) |
| 2023 | → Crown Legacy FC (loan) | 29 | (6) |
| 2023 | → Charlotte FC (loan) | 0 | (0) |
| 2024 | → Chicago Fire II (loan) | 14 | (10) |
| 2024– | Chicago Fire II | 25 | (12) |
| 2024– | Chicago Fire | 3 | (0) |
- * Club domestic league appearances and goals as of 23:17, 17 November 2026 (UTC)

David Poreba (Polish: Poręba; born December 1, 2002) is an American professional soccer player who plays as a midfielder for Major League Soccer club Chicago Fire.

== Career ==
Poreba is a youth product of his local club Chicago Magic PNA since the age of 6, before moving to Chicago Fire FC at 9 and finishing his development with Chicago FC United. In July 2021, he moved to the youth sides of Polish club Stal Mielec, and on July 15, 2022, he signed his first professional contract with them for two seasons. He made his professional debut with them as a substitute in an Ekstraklasa loss to Wisła Płock on May 21, 2022. On December 19, 2022, he signed on loan with Charlotte FC with an option to buy, and was assigned to their development side Crown Legacy FC in the MLS Next Pro where he became captain. He was signed to the matchday squad for Charlotte FC on May 18, 2023. On November 7, 2023, his option to buy was declined by Charlotte.

Poreba was loaned to Chicago Fire FC II in the MLS Next Pro for the 2024 season, and after a prolific start was signed permanently to the club and was named captain. With 20 goals, he won the Golden Boot for the 2024 MLS Next Pro season. He was also named the MVP for the MLS Next Pro that season on October 31, 2024. On December 11, 2024, Poreba signed a professional contract with the senior Chicago Fire side until 2025 with options for 2026, 2027 and 2028. In February 2025, Poreba announced on his Instagram page that he had suffered an ACL injury.

== Personal life ==
Born in the United States, Poreba is of Polish descent and holds dual-citizenship.

== Honors ==
Individual

- MLS Next Pro MVP: 2024
- MLS Next Pro Golden Boot: 2024
- MLS Next Pro Best 11: 2024
