= 2010 SUM U-17 Cup =

2010 SUM U-17 CUP
MLS Youth Cup

Tournament details
- Host country: United States
- City: Friendswood, Texas
- Dates: July 23–29, 2010
- Teams: 16
- Venue: Centennial Park

Final positions
- Champions: D.C. United (3rd title)
- Runners-up: Real Salt Lake

Tournament statistics
- Matches played: 23
- Goals scored: 80 (3.48 per match)
- Top scorer(s): (Mexico) Tamay Sanchez (4 goals)

The 2010 SUM U-17 Cup is the fourth edition of the SUM U-17 Cup. The tournament began on July 23, 2010 and ran through July 29, 2010. All 16 MLS Academy teams participated in this tournament, with the winner of the tournament advancing to play in next year's prestigious Torneo Quixote youth tournament in Spain and the runner up joining the SuperGroup of the Dallas Cup.

== Format ==
The tournament was organized as 4 groups of 4, with each team playing each other team once in their respective groups. Games consist of two 30 or 35 minute halves. Ties are broken by penalty shots, with the loser earning one point and the winner two. The winner of each group will advance to the semi-finals, and the winners to the finals.

3- Points for a win
2- Points for a shootout win
1- Point for a shootout loss
0- Points for a regulation loss

=== Group A ===
Team	Pld	W	SOW	SOL	L	GF	GA	GD	Pts
D.C. United	3	2	1	0	0	4	2	+2	8
Chicago Fire	3	1	1	1	0	4	3	+1	6
Colorado Rapids	3	1	0	1	1	6	6	0	4
San Jose Earthquakes	3	0	0	0	3	2	5	−3	0

July 23, 2010
19:30

Colorado Rapids	3 – 2	San Jose Earthquakes
James Rogers 5' 20'; Santiago Velez 29'		Israel Ayala 16'; Sam Engs 51'

Centennial Park
July 23, 2010
21:00

D.C. United	1 – 1 (D.C. won 5-3 on PKs)	Chicago Fire
Julian Griggs 7'		Andrew Conner 38'

Centennial Park

July 24, 2010	D.C. United	2 – 1	Colorado Rapids	Centennial Park
19:30	Yaw Amankwa 4' Patrick Foss 60'		Eric Kronenberg 16'

July 24, 2010	Chicago Fire	1 – 0	San Jose Earthquakes	Centennial Park
21:00	Kellen Gulley 51'

July 26, 2010	Colorado Rapids	2 –2 (Chicago won 5-3 on PKs)	Chicago	Centennial Park
19:30	Jordan Spring 11'; James Rogers 21'		Kellen Gulley 55' 68'

July 24, 2010	San Jose Earthquakes	0 – 1	D.C. United	Centennial Park
21:00			Collin Martin 56'

=== Group B ===
Team	Pld	W	SOW	SOL	L	GF	GA	GD	Pts
Columbus Crew	3	2	1	0	0	4	2	+2	8
Seattle Sounders FC	3	1	1	0	1	3	3	0	5
Philadelphia Union	3	1	0	1	1	3	3	0	4
FC Dallas	3	0	0	1	2	2	4	−2	1

July 23, 2010	FC Dallas	1 –1 (Seattle won 4-3 on pks)	Seattle Sounders FC	Centennial Park
	Samuel Coleman 38'		Aaron Kovar 12'

July 23, 2010	Columbus Crew	1 –1 (Columbus won 4-3 on pks)	Philadelphia Union	Centennial Park
	Chris Davis 58'		Melvin Snoh 17'

July 24, 2010	Columbus Crew	2 –1	FC Dallas	Centennial Park
	Chris Davis 12'; Al Crognale 47'		Bobby Eddet 49'

July 24, 2010	Seattle Sounders FC	2 –1	Philadelphia Union	Centennial Park
	Michael Gallagher; Ian Lange		Collin O'Neil

July 25, 2010	Columbus Crew	1 –0	Seattle Sounders FC	Centennial Park
	Chris Davis 40'

July 25, 2010	Philadelphia Union	1 –0	FC Dallas	Centennial Park
	Darius Madison 23'

=== Group C ===
Team	Pld	W	SOW	SOL	L	GF	GA	GD	Pts
Houston Dynamo	3	3	0	0	0	7	1	+6	9
Chivas USA	3	2	0	0	1	4	1	+3	6
New England Revolution	3	1	0	0	2	6	6	0	3
Toronto FC	3	0	0	0	3	2	11	−9	0

July 23, 2010	Chivas USA	1 –0	New England Revolution	Centennial Park
	Victor Vazquez 25'

July 23, 2010	Houston Dynamo	3 –0	Toronto FC	Centennial Park
	Miguel Zapata 9'; Isaiah Noreiga 25'; Bryan Salazar 30'

July 24, 2010	Houston Dynamo	3 –1	New England Revolution	Centennial Park
	Tamay Sanchez 11' 44' 56'		Felix DeBonna 42'

July 24, 2010	Chivas USA	3 –0	Toronto FC	Centennial Park
	Ivan Delgado 40'; Kevin de la Torre 50'; Steve Palacios 60'

July 25, 2010	New England Revolution	5 –2	Toronto FC	Centennial Park
	Felix DeBonna 23' 42'; Diego Fagundez 48'; Cole Denormandie 65'; Peguy Ngatcha 67'		Kaheem Christopher 10'; Eric Ngo 70'

July 25, 2010	Houston Dynamo	1 –0	Chivas USA	Centennial Park
	Tamay Sanchez 39'

=== Group D ===
Team	Pld	W	SOW	SOL	L	GF	GA	GD	Pts
Real Salt Lake	3	2	1	0	0	5	2	+3	8
New York Red Bulls	3	1	1	0	1	3	2	+1	5
Sporting Kansas City	3	1	0	0	2	2	5	−3	3
Los Angeles Galaxy	3	0	0	2	1	4	3	−1	2

July 23, 2010	Sporting Kansas City	2 –1	Los Angeles Galaxy	Centennial Park
	Derek Schrick 37' 60'		Eric Gonzalez 18'

July 23, 2010	Real Salt Lake	2 –1	New York Red Bulls	Centennial Park
	Richard Velasco 30'; Maikon Orellana 35'		Brandon Allen 9'

July 24, 2010	Real Salt Lake	1 –1 (Real Salt Lake won on PKS)	Los Angeles Galaxy	Centennial Park
	Dyllan Stevens 48'		Junior Jbopau 49'

July 24, 2010	New York Red Bulls	2 –0	Sporting Kansas City	Centennial Park
	Ethan Decker 42' Brandon Allen 44'

July 25, 2010	Real Salt Lake	2 –0	Sporting Kansas City	Centennial Park
	Richard Haddock 27'; Cole Nagy 49'

July 25, 2010	New York Red Bulls	1 –1 (New York Red Bulls won 4-1 pks)	Los Angeles Galaxy	Centennial Park
	Brandon Allen 56'		Juan Chavez 60'

=== Semi-finals ===
27 July 2010	D.C. United	3 –0	Columbus Crew	Carl Lewis Track & Field Complex
	Cody Albrecht 19'; Julian Griggs 55'; Kainoa Bailey 60'

27 July 2010

Real Salt Lake	1 – 1	Houston Dynamo
		own goal 4'; Miguel Zapata 51'
Penalties
Richard Velasco (penalty scored); Nick Semintendi (penalty scored); Tanner Clay (penalty scored); Junior Jbopau (penalty scored); Antonio Murillo (penalty missed); Cole Nagy (penalty scored)	5 – 4	(penalty missed) Juan Ramirez; (penalty scored) Diego Martinez Del Campo; (penalty scored) Manuel Chavez; (penalty scored) Fernando Piña; (penalty scored) Martin Fiemawhle; (penalty missed) Bradley Bourgeois

Carl Lewis Track & Field Complex

=== Final ===
29 July 2010

Real Salt Lake	0 – 0	D.C. United
Penalties
Richard Velasco (penalty scored); Nick Semintendi (penalty scored); Matt Gay (penalty scored); Tanner Clay (penalty scored); Junior Jbopau (penalty missed); Cole Nagy (penalty missed); Matt Taylor (penalty missed); Eric Christensen (penalty missed); Julio Alcaron (penalty missed)	4 – 5	(penalty scored) Nathaniel Eggleston; (penalty scored) Marco Hurtado; (penalty scored) Julian Griggs; (penalty scored) Cody Albrecht; (penalty missed) Romain Gall; (penalty missed) Kainoa Bailey; (penalty missed) Mahamamoudou Kaba; (penalty missed) Jordan Manley; (penalty scored) Dakota Niedermeier

Robertson Stadium, Houston
