= El Mahdi Youssoufi =

Moroccan footballer

Personal information
- Full name: El Mahdi Youssoufi
- Date of birth: 18 September 1998 (age 28)
- Place of birth: Tangier, Morocco
- Position: Forward

Team information
- Current team: New York City FC II
- Number: 36

Youth career
- Mohammed VI Football Academy
- FUS Rabat

College career
Years	Team	Apps	(Gls)
2019–2022	St. Francis Brooklyn Terriers	39	(21)

Senior career*
Years	Team	Apps	(Gls)
2021	Toledo Villa	3	(0)
2021	NY Pancyprian-Freedoms		
2022	New York City FC II	16	(2)
- * Club domestic league appearances and goals as of 20 September 2022

El Mahdi Youssoufi (born 18 September 1998) is a Moroccan footballer.

== Playing career ==
=== Youth ===
In his childhood, El Mahdi Youssoufi passed through and graduated from the Mohammed VI Football Academy. At both under-15 and under-19 level he finished the season as the team's top scorer while also winning the league. After leaving them, he signed for Moroccan top-tier side FUS Rabat.

=== College & amateur ===
In 2019 Youssoufi applied for the Second Chance program, in which young Moroccans are able to study in an American university on a joint footballing and academic course; he would pick a degree in management at St. Francis College in Brooklyn. He would study there for three years before graduating; in that time he would play 39 games, scoring 21 goals.

While at college, Youssoufi also appeared in the USL League Two with Toledo Villa, making three appearances in 2021. He also spent the fall with the New York Pancyprian-Freedoms in the Eastern Premier Soccer League.

Following his release from NYCFC II, Youssoufi returned to the Pancyprian-Freedoms in the EPSL. In 2024, he appeared with FC Motown in the National Premier Soccer League and helped the team reach the national final. Following the summer, Youssoufi joined New York Greek American in the EPSL and helped the team win the 2024 NISA Nation National Championship.

=== Senior ===
After graduation, El Mahdi Youssoufi was selected for the 2022 MLS SuperDraft. He was selected by MLS Cup holders New York City FC as the 84th pick in the third round. By being selected he became the first Second Chance player to join an American club and the first player from St. Francis College to be selected in the SuperDraft. He would ultimately sign for their MLS Next Pro side, New York City FC II, being announced on 24 March as one of their players for their inaugural season.

His competitive debut came as a substitute in a 7–0 defeat of Inter Miami II on 16 April 2022 and his first start would come two weeks later, in a loss to Philadelphia Union II. His first goal came on 8 May, the final goal in a 4–1 win over Toronto FC II.

== Career statistics ==
As of match played 20 September 2022.

Appearances and goals by club, season and competition
Club	Season	League			Cup (Note: Includes the US Open Cup)		Continental		Total	
Club	Season	Division	Apps	Goals	Apps	Goals	Apps	Goals	Apps	Goals
New York City FC II	2022	MLS Next Pro	16	2	—		—		16	2
Career total			16	2	0	0	0	0	16	2
