= Jack Lynn (soccer) =

American soccer player (born 2000)

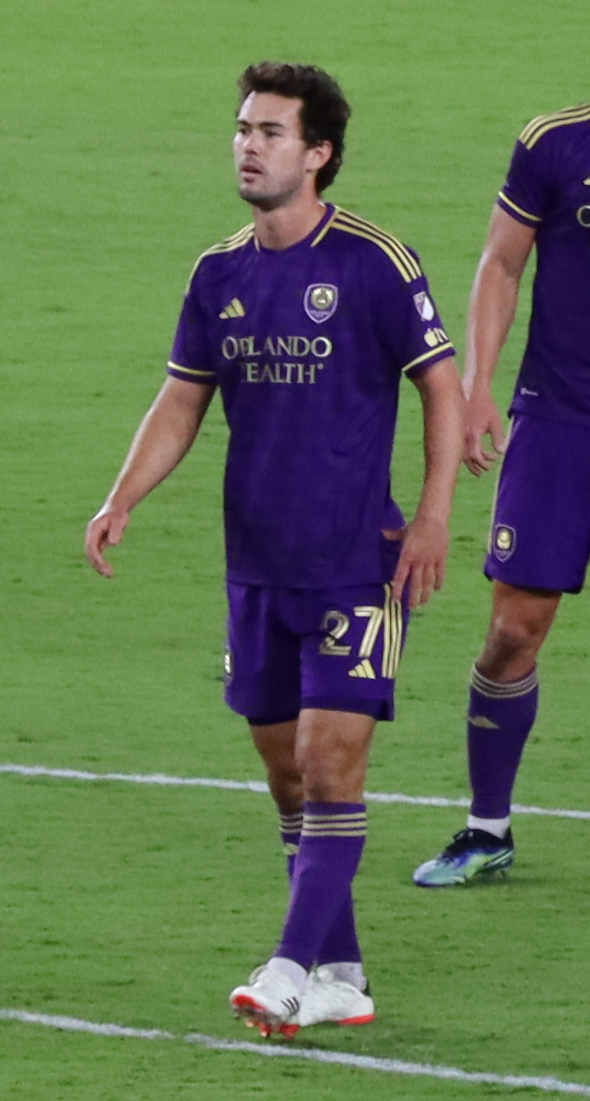
- Lynn with Orlando City in 2024

Personal information
- Full name: John Charles Lynn
- Date of birth: January 12, 2000 (age 26)
- Place of birth: St. Louis, Missouri, U.S.
- Height: 6 ft 1 in (1.85 m)
- Position: Forward

Youth career
- 2013–2017: St. Louis Scott Gallagher

College career
Years	Team	Apps	(Gls)
2018–2021	Notre Dame Fighting Irish	79	(31)

Senior career*
Years	Team	Apps	(Gls)
2017–2018	Saint Louis FC	0	(0)
2022–2025	Orlando City	17	(2)
2022–2024	→ Orlando City B (loan)	51	(37)
2022	→ San Antonio FC (loan)	5	(0)
Total		73	(39)
- * Club domestic league appearances and goals

John Charles Lynn (born January 12, 2000) is an American former professional soccer player who played as a forward.

A Notre Dame Fighting Irish alumni, Lynn was picked by Major League Soccer club Orlando City in the first round of the 2022 MLS SuperDraft. Lynn would spend the majority of his professional career playing for Orlando City's reserve team, Orlando City B, in MLS Next Pro.

== Early years ==
Lynn was brought to play at a local soccer youth league by his parents when he was about 4-years-old and fell in love with the sport. He later prepped at Chaminade College Preparatory where he was a member of the National Honor Society and winner of the Chaminade College Preparatory Academic Scholarship. He played club soccer for St. Louis Scott Gallagher SC of the U.S. Soccer Development Academy from 2013, graduating to the Saint Louis FC academy team in 2017.

=== Notre Dame Fighting Irish ===
Lynn played four seasons of college soccer at the University of Notre Dame for the Fighting Irish between 2018 and 2021. As a freshman he appeared in all 21 matches including three starts, scoring three goals. He most notably scored the overtime game-winner against Virginia Cavaliers to send Notre Dame to the 2018 NCAA College Cup quarterfinals. Lynn led the Irish in goals in each of the next three seasons including a perfect six for six on penalties during his college career. In 2021, Notre Dame won the ACC Men's Soccer Tournament for the first time in team history. Individually, Lynn was a First Team All-ACC selection in the 2020 and 2021 seasons and 2021 United Soccer Coaches Second Team All-American.

== Club career ==
=== Saint Louis FC ===
On July 7, 2018, Lynn was named to a senior matchday squad for the first time as an unused substitute for Saint Louis FC in a USL Championship match against Las Vegas Lights FC.

=== Orlando City B ===
Lynn made his professional debut with the team's reserve affiliate, Orlando City B, in MLS Next Pro on March 26, 2022, and scored both goals in a 2–0 win over Chicago Fire FC II. On May 21, he scored his first career hat-trick as part of a 6–0 win over Inter Miami CF II. In total, Lynn made 18 appearances for Orlando City B during the 2022 MLS Next Pro season, scored 15 goals, making him highest scorer for the club, and was named to the MLS Next Pro Best XI.

In the 2023 MLS Next Pro season, Lynn was once again the club's top scorer with 19 goals and shared the MLS Next Pro Golden Boot award alongside New York City FC II's MD Myers and Colorado Rapids 2's Rémi Cabral. For his performances throughout the season, Lynn was once again named to the MLS Next Pro Best XI and was voted to be the 2023 MLS Next Pro Most Valuable Player.

=== Orlando City ===
On January 11, 2022, Lynn was selected as the 18th overall pick in the first round of the 2022 MLS SuperDraft by Orlando City. The following month, on February 16, Lynn signed a one-year first team contract with club options for 2023, 2024, and 2025. Lynn made his first appearance for the club when he came on as a 88th minute substitute for Rodrigo Schlegel in a 3–0 loss to New York Red Bulls on April 24.

==== Loan to San Antonio FC ====
On September 16, 2022, Lynn was loaned to USL Championship side San Antonio FC for the remainder of the 2022 season with the right to recall. Lynn would make his first appearance for the club the next day when he came on as a 62nd minute substitute for Ignacio Bailone in a 1–1 draw with New Mexico United. On October 1, Lynn started for the first time during his loan before he was taken off in the 64th minute for Bailone in a 1–0 victory over Pittsburgh Riverhounds.

==== Return to Orlando City ====
Lynn returned to Orlando City for the 2023 season, and he made his first appearance following his return on March 18 in a 2–1 loss to Charlotte FC when he came on as a 82nd minute substitute for César Araújo.

In the following season, Lynn made his first start and scored his first goal for the club on March 23, 2024, in a 2–0 victory over Austin FC.

After having his contract option exercised by Orlando City to extend his tenure at the club, on January 18, 2025, Lynn announced his retirement from playing professional soccer to pursue a career outside of the sport at the age of 25-years-old.

== Personal life ==
Lynn's father, John, played soccer at Saint Louis University from 1988 to 1991. Lynn loves to golf in his free time and he idolizes Cristiano Ronaldo.

After retiring from professional soccer, Lynn became an intern for Eagle Private Capital in January 2025, where he worked until April, before joining William Blair as a full-time investing banking analyst in July 2025.

== Career statistics ==
=== College ===
Appearances and goals by college and season
School	Season	Division	Apps	Goals
Notre Dame Fighting Irish	2018	Div. I	21	3
Notre Dame Fighting Irish	2019	Div. I	19	10
Notre Dame Fighting Irish	2020–21	Div. I	16	8
Notre Dame Fighting Irish	2021	Div. I	23	10
Career total			79	31

=== Club ===
Appearances and goals by club, season and competition
Club	Season	League			National cup		Playoffs		Continental		Other		Total	
Club	Season	Division	Apps	Goals	Apps	Goals	Apps	Goals	Apps	Goals	Apps	Goals	Apps	Goals
Saint Louis FC	2017	United Soccer League	0	0	0	0	—		—		—		0	0
Saint Louis FC	2018	United Soccer League	0	0	0	0	0	0	—		—		0	0
Saint Louis FC	Total		0	0	—		0	0	—		—		0	0
Orlando City	2022	Major League Soccer	3	0	1	0	—		—		—		4	0
Orlando City	2023	Major League Soccer	3	0	—		—		—		—		3	0
Orlando City	2024	Major League Soccer	11	2	—		1	0	2 (Note: Appearance(s) in CONCACAF Champions Cup)	0	1 (Note: Appearances in Leagues Cup)	0	15	2
Orlando City	Total		17	2	1	0	1	0	2	0	1	0	22	2
Orlando City B (loan)	2022	MLS Next Pro	18	15	—		—		—		—		18	15
Orlando City B (loan)	2023	MLS Next Pro	26	19	—		1	0	—		—		27	19
Orlando City B (loan)	2024	MLS Next Pro	7	3	—		1	1	—		—		8	4
Orlando City B (loan)	Total		51	37	—		2	1	—		—		53	38
San Antonio FC (loan)	2022	USL Championship	5	0	—		—		—		—		5	0
Career total			73	39	1	0	3	1	2	0	1	0	80	40

== Honors ==
Notre Dame Fighting Irish

- ACC Men's Soccer Tournament: 2021

Orlando City

- U.S. Open Cup: 2022

Individual

- MLS Next Pro Best XI: 2022, 2023
- MLS Next Pro Most Valuable Player: 2023
- MLS Next Pro Golden Boot: 2023
