= Michael Wentzel =

American soccer player (born 2002)

Personal information
- Full name: Michael Wentzel
- Date of birth: April 10, 2002 (age 24)
- Place of birth: State College, Pennsylvania, U.S.
- Height: 6 ft 2 in (1.88 m)
- Position: Defender

Team information
- Current team: Real Monarchs
- Number: 80

Youth career
- Karlsruher SC
- 2018–2020: Borussia Mönchengladbach

Senior career*
Years	Team	Apps	(Gls)
2020–2022	Borussia Mönchengladbach II	56	(6)
2022–2023	RW Oberhausen	14	(1)
2023–2026	St. Louis City 2	50	(3)
2024–2026	St. Louis City SC	6	(0)
2026–	Real Monarchs	9	(0)

International career
2023–	United States U23	3	(0)
- * Club domestic league appearances and goals as of October 19, 2026

Michael Wentzel (born April 20, 2002) is an American soccer player who plays as a defender for Real Monarchs. He previously played for Rot-Weiß Oberhausen and generally plays as a central defender.

== Early life ==
Wentzel is the son of an economics professor.
