= Gibran Rayo =

American soccer player (born 2001)

Personal information
- Full name: Gibran Rayo Najera
- Date of birth: October 14, 2001 (age 25)
- Place of birth: Dallas, Texas, United States
- Height: 1.76 m (5 ft 9 in)
- Position: Forward

Team information
- Current team: Foro SC
- Number: 3

Youth career
- –2017: Sporting United SC
- 2017–2019: FC Dallas

Senior career*
Years	Team	Apps	(Gls)
2019–2021	North Texas SC	52	(9)
2022	Rochester NY	24	(13)
2023–2024	Columbus Crew 2	46	(16)
2025–	Foro SC	0	(0)

International career
- Mexico U16
- United States U18
- * Club domestic league appearances and goals as of March 20, 2025

Gibran Rayo Najera (born October 14, 2001) is an American professional soccer player who plays as a forward for Foro SC in the United Premier Soccer League.

== Career ==
Rayo played for North Texas SC while still a member of the FC Dallas Academy in 2019 and rejoined North Texas for the 2020 season.

On March 16, 2022, Rayo signed with MLS Next Pro independent side Rochester New York FC ahead of the 2022 season.

Rayo signed with defending 2022 MLS Next Pro champions Columbus Crew 2 on December 22, 2022. He also played with the Columbus Crew Academy team that participated in the United Premier Soccer League (UPSL).

In 2025, Rayo joined UPSL club Foro SC ahead of their participation in the 2025 U.S. Open Cup.

== Honors ==
North Texas SC

- USL League One Regular Season Title: 2019
- USL League One Championship: 2019

== Career statistics ==
As of August 8, 2024

Appearances and goals by club, season and competition
Club	Season	League			Cup (Note: Appearances in U.S. Open Cup)		Other		Total	
Club	Season	Division	Apps	Goals	Apps	Goals	Apps	Goals	Apps	Goals
North Texas	2019	USL League One	12	1	—	—	0	0	12	1
North Texas	2020	USL League One	14	1	—	—	—	—	14	1
North Texas	2021	USL League One	26	7	—	—	1 (Note: Appearances in USL League One Playoffs)	0	27	7
North Texas	Total		52	9	—	—	1	0	53	9
Rochester New York	2022	MLS Next Pro	23	13	3	1	1 (Note: Appearances in MLS Next Pro Playoffs)	0	27	14
Columbus Crew 2	2023	MLS Next Pro	21	11	—	—	3	1	24	12
Columbus Crew 2	2024	MLS Next Pro	18	5	—	—	—	—	18	5
Columbus Crew 2	Total		39	16	—	—	3	1	42	17
Columbus Crew	2023	MLS	0	0	1	0	—	—	1	0
Career Total			114	38	4	1	5	1	123	40
