= John Denis =

American soccer player

Personal information
- Full name: John Merlo Denis
- Date of birth: February 3, 1998 (age 28)
- Position: Forward

Team information
- Current team: New York City II
- Number: 28

Youth career
- 2009–: New York Soccer Club
- –2016: Beachside SC

College career
Years	Team	Apps	(Gls)
2016–2020	Columbia Lions	64	(19)

Senior career*
Years	Team	Apps	(Gls)
2018	New York Red Bulls U-23	13	(5)
2020	New York Cosmos	3	(0)
2021	New Amsterdam	6	(1)
2022–	New York City II	26	(17)
2023–	New York City	0	(0)

International career
2019	United States U19	1	(0)
2023–	Honduras		
- * Club domestic league appearances and goals as of July 14, 2023

John Denis (born February 3, 1998) is an American-Honduran soccer player who plays for New York City II in the MLS Next Pro.

== Playing career ==
=== Youth ===
In 2009, Denis joined local youth side New York Soccer Club. By 2015 he had moved to another youth club, Beachside SC, with whom he played in the USSDA league, at both under-16 and under-18 level. At the end of the 2015–16 season he was nominated to the East Conference team of the year.

=== College ===
In 2016, Denis attended Columbia University to play college soccer. Over four years he played a total of 64 games, scoring 19 goals.

=== Senior ===
In 2018, while still studying at college, Denis was offered the chance to play for New York Red Bulls U-23 in the Premier Development League. He would eventually feature for them 13 times, scoring 5 times.

After graduating, Denis joined the New York Cosmos of the NISA in July 2020. He would ultimately make only three substitute appearances in the course of the 2020 season.

John Denis would then move to another local NISA club, New Amsterdam FC. With New Amsterdam he was a little more successful, being given six starts in which he would score one goal.

On March 24, 2022, it was announced that Denis had signed with MLS Next Pro side New York City FC II ahead of the league's inaugural season. On March 27 he scored the team's first ever competitive goal, netting in the 9th minute against New England Revolution II in a game which would ultimately be lost on penalties.

== International career ==
In January 2016, while still playing for youth team Beachside SC, Denis was called up by former national team goalkeeper Brad Friedel to the United States under-19 team to participate in the Copa del Atlantico. He featured once for the team, appearing as a substitute in a loss to Spain.

== Career statistics ==
As of matches played September 19, 2022.

Appearances and goals by club, season and competition
Club	Season	League			Cup (Note: Includes the US Open Cup)		Continental		Total	
Club	Season	Division	Apps	Goals	Apps	Goals	Apps	Goals	Apps	Goals
New York Red Bulls U-23	2018	PDL	13	5	—		—		13	5
New York Cosmos	2020	NISA	3	0	—		—		3	0
New Amsterdam FC	2021	NISA	6	1	—		—		6	1
New York City FC II	2022	MLS Next Pro	18	14	—		—		18	14
Career total			40	20	0	0	0	0	40	20
