= Generation Adidas Cup =

- Founded: 2007
- Region: United States; Canada
- Teams: 12 (international division)
- Current champions: (Spain) Valencia (U15) (1st title) (United States) Philadelphia Union (U17) (3rd title)
- Most championships: D.C. United; River Plate (3 titles)

The Generation Adidas Cup (previously known as the SUM U-17 Cup) is a competition run by Major League Soccer for all U-17 MLS academy teams. As part of the Homegrown Initiative, the Generation Adidas Cup focused on player development while providing elite competition for those involved. From 2014 onwards international club sides have been invited to the competition to test MLS academies against foreign opposition, Stoke City of England became the first international winners of the tournament in the same year.

The tournament served as a springboard into the professional game for some top prospects, such as Tristan Bowen (Los Angeles Galaxy), Julien Ngoy (Stoke City), Andy Najar (D.C. United), Bryan Leyva (FC Dallas), Juan Agudelo (New York Red Bulls), Bill Hamid (D.C. United), Victor Ulloa (FC Dallas), and Sebastian Saucedo (Real Salt Lake).

== Competition ==
The tournament initially consisted of four groups made up of four teams from foundation to 2012, with the top team from each group advancing to the single-game knockout stages. For the 2013–2014 season a new format was introduced, early in the season a qualifying tournament for domestic teams was held with the top nine sides plus three invitational foreign sides qualifying for the finals of the tournament in 2014.

The 2014 finals was contested with three groups of four teams with one foreign side in each group, with the group winners and the best runner-up advancing to the knock out stage. A second "domestic" division is contested for MLS clubs with did not qualify for the finals proper.

For 2015 the "International Division" was renamed as the "Champions Division". As before there were three groups of four teams, however the number of foreign teams per group was increased to two meaning only the top six MLS academy teams qualified. The secondary domestic division was renamed as the "Premier Division" and one foreign team was invited to compete in each group.

Seattle Sounders FC became the first MLS team to win the new Champions Division, defeating Valencia CF in the 2019 final. The entire tournament was streamed on Twitch.

== Match format ==
Games consist of two 35 minute halves. In the group stages, when there is a draw, a penalty shoot out is held to award an extra point. Draws after normal time in the knockout stages are settled with a penalty shoot out with no extra time played.

== Finals ==
| Year | Winners | Score | Runners-up | Host |
|---|---|---|---|---|
| 2007 | (United States) D.C. United | 3–0 | (United States) Kansas City Wizards | Dick's Sporting Goods Park, Commerce City, Colorado |
| 2008 | (United States) Real Salt Lake | 1–1 (5–4p) | (United States) D.C. United | Dick's Sporting Goods Park, Commerce City, Colorado |
| 2009 | (United States) D.C. United | 1–1 (6–5p) | (United States) FC Dallas | Dick's Sporting Goods Park, Commerce City, Colorado |
| 2010 | (United States) D.C. United | 0–0 (5–4p) | (United States) Real Salt Lake | Robertson Stadium, Houston, Texas |
| 2011 | (United States) Los Angeles Galaxy | 2–0 | (United States) FC Dallas | Pizza Hut Park, Frisco, Texas |
| 2012 | (United States) Philadelphia Union | 2–2 (4–3p) | (Canada) Toronto FC | Starfire Sports Complex, Tukwila, Washington |
| 2014 | (England) Stoke City | 1–1 (4–2p) | (United States) Real Salt Lake | Toyota Stadium, Frisco, Texas |
| 2015 | (Argentina) River Plate | 1–0 | (Germany) Eintracht Frankfurt | Toyota Stadium, Frisco, Texas |
| 2016 | (Argentina) River Plate | 2–0 | Universidad de Chile | Toyota Stadium, Frisco, Texas |
| 2017 | (Argentina) River Plate | 2–1 | (Brazil) Flamengo | Toyota Stadium, Frisco, Texas |
| 2018 | (Brazil) Flamengo | 1–0 | (Brazil) Atlético Paranaense | Toyota Stadium, Frisco, Texas |
| 2019 | (United States) Seattle Sounders FC | 1–0 | (Spain) Valencia | Toyota Stadium, Frisco, Texas |
| 2020 | Not held due to the COVID-19 pandemic | | | |
| 2021 | Not held due to the COVID-19 pandemic | | | |
| 2022 (U-15) | (United States) Portland Timbers | 2–0 | (Spain) Valencia | Toyota Stadium, Frisco, Texas |
| 2022 (U-17) | (United States) Seattle Sounders FC | 2–0 | (Mexico) Tigres UANL | Toyota Stadium, Frisco, Texas |
| 2023 (U-15) | (United States) Austin FC | 1–1 (7–6p) | (United States) Philadelphia Union | IMG Academy Field, Bradenton, Florida |
| 2023 (U-17) | (United States) Philadelphia Union | 1–0 | (United States) FC Dallas | IMG Academy Field, Bradenton, Florida |
| 2024 (U-15) | (Spain) Valencia | 2–0 | (France) Toulouse | IMG Academy Field, Bradenton, Florida |
| 2024 (U-17) | (United States) Philadelphia Union | 2–2 (5–4p) | (United States) LA Galaxy | IMG Academy Field, Bradenton, Florida |
| 2025 (U-16) | (United States) Real Salt Lake | 4–0 | (United States) LA Galaxy | IMG Academy Field, Bradenton, Florida |
| 2025 (U-18) | (United States) Orlando City SC | 2–1 (a.e.t.) | (United States) Colorado Rapids | IMG Academy Field, Bradenton, Florida |
