= Matt Pilkington =

English football manager

Personal information
- Date of birth: 27 June 1979 (age 47)
- Place of birth: Rochdale, England
- Position: Midfielder

Team information
- Current team: New York City FC II

Youth career
- Rochdale

College career
Years	Team	Apps	(Gls)
2000–2002	George Washington Colonials		

Senior career*
Years	Team	Apps	(Gls)
2002	Richmond Kickers		

Managerial career
- 2005–2008: D.C. United (academy coach)
- 2013–2014: Bethesda-Olney USDA (u-17 coach)
- 2014–2016: Downtown United SC (academy technical director)
- 2016–2018: New York City FC (u-15/u-16 head coach)
- 2018–2022: New York City FC (u-19 head coach)
- 2022–: New York City FC II
- * Club domestic league appearances and goals

Matt Pilkington (born 27 June 1979) is an English football manager, who is head coach for New York City FC II in MLS Next Pro.

== Playing career ==
Born in Rochdale, England, Pilkington was part of the academy of Rochdale F.C. as a child.

Pilkington studied in the US, featuring for the collegiate teams for George Washington University. After graduation he signed for the Richmond Kickers, then competing in the second tier of the A-League but shortly to transfer to the United Soccer League.

== Managerial career ==
Before beginning his playing career Pilkington began his transition to coaching, receiving an English FA coaching licence in 1998.

In 2005, Pilkington joined the DC United academy set-up, remaining as part of the coaching staff until 2008. Several years later he would return to coaching, joining Bethesda-Olney in the U.S. Soccer Development Academy. In 2014 he transferred to local New York youth team Downtown United SC, for whom he would act as academy technical director across age groups from under-12 to under-18. Through Downtown United's connection to new MLS side New York City FC he would earn a move to NYCFC's nascent academy structure, starting as u-15/u-16 head coach and working his way up to u-19 head coach.

On 9 February 2022, he was appointed as the first ever head coach of New York City FC II, NYCFC's development team playing in the newly formed MLS Next Pro.

== Managerial statistics ==
All competitive games (league, domestic and continental cups) are included.

As of May 2, 2022

Team	Nat	Year	Record						
Team	Nat	Year	G	W	D	L	F	A	Win %
New York City FC II	(United States)	2022–	6	2	2	2	16	11	33.33
Career Total			6	2	2	2	16	11	33.33

== Honours ==
New York City FC u-16

- Generation Adidas Cup Premier Division Champions: 2017

New York City FC u-19

- USSDA Championship: 2018, 2019
