= Alex Rando =

American soccer player (born 2001)

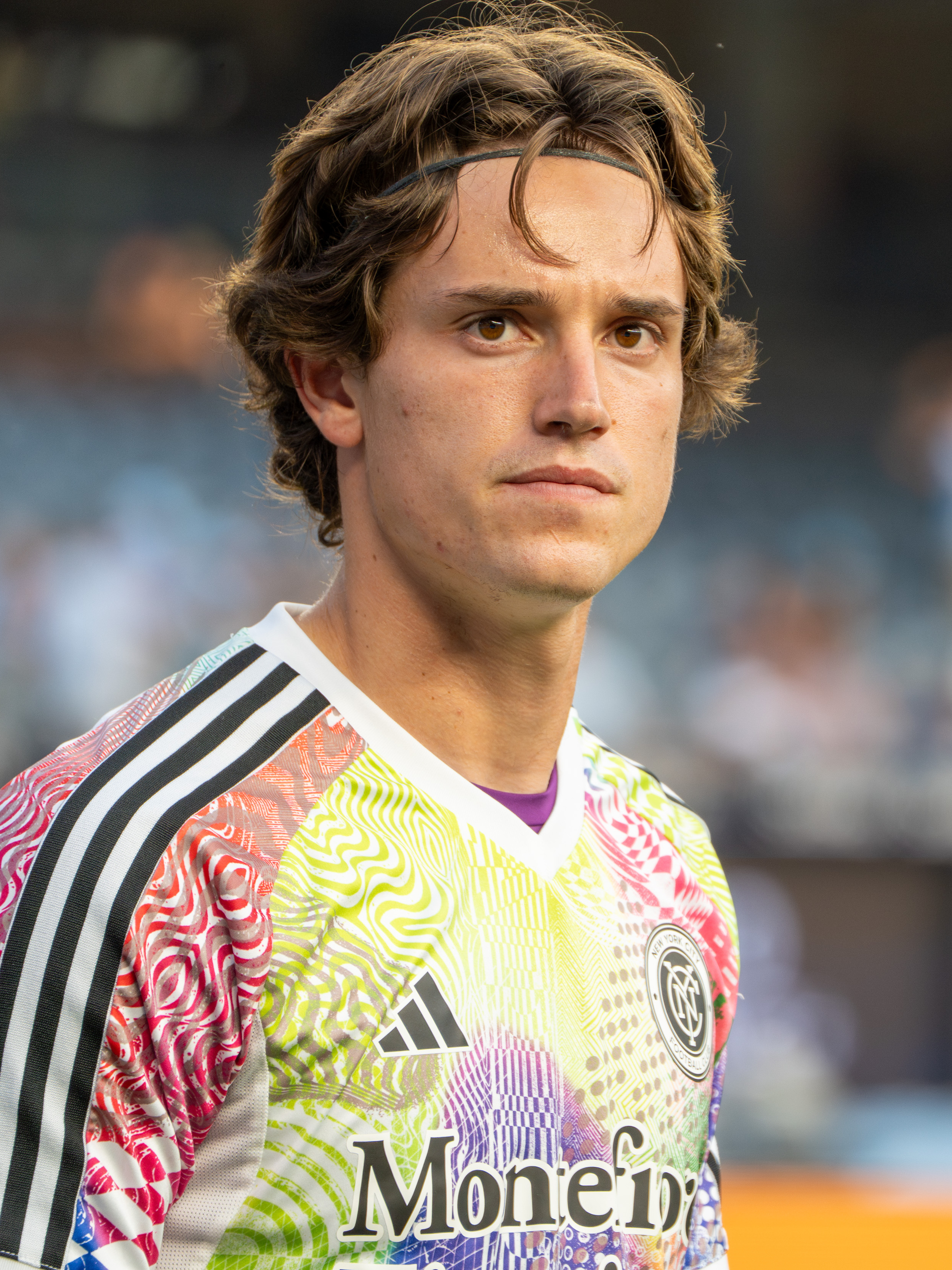
- Rando with New York City FC in 2025

Personal information
- Full name: Alexander Rando
- Date of birth: April 15, 2001 (age 25)
- Place of birth: New York City, New York, US
- Height: 6 ft 4 in (1.93 m)
- Position: Goalkeeper

Team information
- Current team: Orange County SC
- Number: 1

Youth career
- 2015–2019: New York City FC

College career
Years	Team	Apps	(Gls)
2019	Stanford Cardinal	0	(0)
2020	Virginia Cavaliers	10	(0)

Senior career*
Years	Team	Apps	(Gls)
2021	Las Vegas Lights	27	(0)
2022–2025	New York City FC II	40	(0)
2024–2025	New York City FC	0	(0)
2026–	Orange County SC	30	(0)
- * Club domestic league appearances and goals as of 13:51, 10 November 2026 (UTC)

Alexander Rando (born April 15, 2001) is an American professional soccer player who plays as a goalkeeper for Orange County SCin the USL Championship.

== Playing career ==
=== Youth ===
Rando played as part of the New York City FC academy until 2019, where he was a two-time U-19 U.S. Development Academy National Champion.

=== College ===
In 2019, Rando attended Stanford University to play college soccer, but never appeared for team after returning home before the start of the season. For 2020, Rando transferred to the University of Virginia, where he made 10 appearances during a season affected by the COVID-19 pandemic. Prior to joining Virginia, Rando spent two and a half weeks with League of Ireland side Dundalk.

=== Professional ===
On May 22, 2021, it was announced Rando was on the roster for USL Championship club Las Vegas Lights and he immediately made his debut against Phoenix Rising, starting in a 5–1 loss.

On March 24, 2022, it was announced Rando had signed with MLS Next Pro side New York City FC II ahead of the league's inaugural season.

On January 12, 2024, New York City FC signed Rando on a first team contract. On December 1, 2025, the team announced that they had declined Rando's contract option.

On January 20, 2026, Rando joined USL Championship side Orange County SC.

== Personal ==
Rando has dual citizenship, holding an Irish passport through his mother.
