= Kenny Bundy =

American soccer player

Personal information
- Full name: Kenneth Bundy
- Date of birth: March 9, 1981 (age 45)
- Place of birth: Tulsa, Oklahoma, U.S.
- Height: 5 ft 9 in (1.75 m)
- Position: Midfielder

College career
Years	Team	Apps	(Gls)
1999–2003	UNC Greensboro Spartans		

Senior career*
Years	Team	Apps	(Gls)
2003	Carolina Dynamo	23	(0)
2003–2004	Dallas Sidekicks (indoor)	22	(0)
2004–2007	Wilmington Hammerheads	57	(11)
2009	Wilmington Hammerheads	20	(4)
Total		122	(15)

Managerial career
- 2016–2022: Houston Dynamo (academy)
- 2017: Houston Dash (assistant)
- 2019: Brazos Valley Cavalry
- 2019: Houston Dynamo (interim assistant)
- 2022–2024: Houston Dynamo 2
- 2022: Houston Dynamo (interim)
- 2024: Houston Dynamo (interim assistant)
- 2025–: Houston Dynamo (assistant)
- * Club domestic league appearances and goals

Kenny Bundy (born March 9, 1981) is an American former soccer player who is currently an assistant coach for Houston Dynamo FC in Major League Soccer.

== Career ==
=== College and amateur ===
Bundy grew up in Bixby, Oklahoma, and played college soccer at the University of North Carolina at Greensboro from 1999 to 2003. During the 2003 collegiate off season he spent the summer with the Carolina Dynamo of the USL Premier Development League.

=== Professional ===
Bundy signed as a free agent with the Dallas Sidekicks of the Major Indoor Soccer League on October 2, 2003. He spent the 2003–2004 season in Dallas, but the team withdrew from the league at the end of the season. The Chicago Storm selected Bundy in the third round of the Dispersal Draft, but he did not sign with them.

Instead, he signed with the Wilmington Hammerheads of the USL Second Division, where he has remained ever since, clocking over 80 games for the team in four seasons.

After a year out of soccer in 2008 Bundy returned to the Hammerheads for the 2009 season. He was subsequently named to the 2009 USL2 All-League First Team.

== Coaching ==
In addition to his playing career, Bundy previously was a coach with Developmental Elite Coaching in Wilmington.

Bundy was named head coach of Houston Dynamo 2 in MLS Next Pro. When Dynamo first team head coach Paulo Nagamura was fired 29 games into the 2022 season, Bundy assumed interim duties on September 5.

In January 2025, Bundy was brought up to the Houston Dynamo first team coaching staff.

== Honors ==
=== Wilmington Hammerheads ===
- USL Second Division Regular Season Champions (1): 2009

=== Dallas Sidekicks ===
Scored the 3,500th goal in Dallas Sidekicks history.
