= Queensboro FC =

- Full name: Queensboro FC
- Short name: QBFC
- Founded: November 12, 2019; 6 years ago
- Dissolved: 2022
- Stadium: Aviator Field, Brooklyn, New York
- Capacity: 6,000
- Owner(s): David Villa, Jonathan A. Krane, Aly Wagner
- President: Adam Schneider
Home colors	Away colors

Queensboro FC (QBFC) was an American professional soccer club based in the borough of Queens in New York City. It was founded in November 2019, and unveiled an official crest and color scheme on October 6, 2020.

Its men's team was originally announced as a 2021 expansion team in the USL Championship, the second division of professional soccer in the United States. However, their start date was moved from the 2021 season to the 2022 season, and later to the 2023 season, before being cancelled altogether.

The club did briefly field a women's team in the USL W League, a reserve team in the UPSL, and a youth team in the USL Academy. The W League and UPSL teams withdrew from their respective leagues following the end of their 2022 seasons.

The men's team was removed from the USL website entirely as of November 2022, and it was reported that they were instead considering applying to play in the third division MLS Next Pro.

By the time New York City FC of Major League Soccer announced it had a deal to build a new stadium in Queens, Queensboro FC was reportedly defunct, with its website forwarding to an unrelated commercial site. It never fielded a senior men's team.

== Colors and badge ==
QBFC's branding incorporated the IRT Flushing Line's distinctive purple

The club's badge was designed by the Carbone Smolan Agency, which also released a 110-page explainer document detailing the inspiration and design process. The badge featured a distinctive shade of bright purple inspired by the color of the 7 train, crowned with an abstract depiction of the Queensboro Bridge in the shape of a crown.

The home uniform for QBFC's teams in the W League and UPSL was a purple-and-black striped jersey, paired with black shorts and socks. The away uniform was a white jersey with a purple pattern, paired with white shorts and socks. It was planned that the men's team would wear the same kits, had it actually taken the field.

== Stadium ==
The women's and youth teams played at Aviator Sports and Events Center in the Marine Park neighborhood of southeast Brooklyn.

On April 27, 2021, the club announced plans to construct a 7,500-seat stadium on the campus of York College in Jamaica, Queens as a temporary home before building a permanent stadium elsewhere in the borough. With construction planned to start in summer 2022, it would have been the first soccer-specific stadium in New York City. By June 2023, the proposed stadium had been "nixed" and York College had instead broken ground on its own soccer and track & field complex, on a different plot of campus land.

== Men's team ==
=== Head coaches ===
Josep Gombau was named the team's first head coach and sporting director on July 6, 2020. On June 8, 2022, with the team's debut already pushed back two years, he left to coach Odisha FC of the Indian Super League.

Coach	Nationality	Start	End	Games	Win	Loss	Draw	Win %
Josep Gombau	Spain	July 6, 2020	June 8, 2022	0	0	0	0	—

== Women's team ==
Queensboro FC Women
- Founded: June 8, 2021; 5 years ago
- Dissolved: 2022
- Stadium: Aviator Sports and Events Center; Brooklyn, New York
- Capacity: 6,000
- Head Coach: Nadia Caballero
- League: USL W League
- 2022: 3rd Place, Metropolitan Division; Playoffs: DNQ
- Website: https://www.queensborofc.com/wleague/

On June 8, 2021, QBFC announced they would field a women's side to compete in 2022 as an original franchise in the new USL W League. After missing the playoffs by one point in its first and only season, the club did not return to the USL W League for the 2023 season.

=== Year-by-year ===
Season	USL W League								Playoffs	Top Scorer		Head coach
Season	P	W	L	D	GF	GA	Pts	Pos	Playoffs	Player	Goals	Head coach
2022	12	8	3	1	33	12	25	3rd Place, Metropolitan	did not qualify	(Dominican Republic) Mía Asenjo	11	(Spain) Nadia Caballero

=== Head coaches ===
- Includes Regular Season and Playoffs. Excludes friendlies.

Coach	Nationality	Start	End	Games	Win	Loss	Draw	Win %
Nadia Caballero	Spain	January 12, 2022	July 9, 2022	12	8	3	1	66.67
