= New York City FC II =

American soccer team

- Nicknames: Young Pigeons; The Baby Blues
- Short name: NYCFC II
- Founded: December 6, 2021; 4 years ago
- Stadium: Belson Stadium; Queens, New York City
- Capacity: 2,168
- Owners: New York City FC (City Football Group)
- Head coach: Matt Pilkington
- League: MLS Next Pro
- 2025: 12th, Eastern Conference; Playoffs: Did not qualify
- Website: www.nycfc.com/nycfcii
Home colors	Away colors

New York City FC II is an American professional soccer team based in New York City. It is the reserve team and minor league affiliate of New York City FC, and plays in MLS Next Pro, the third tier of the United States soccer league system.

== History ==
When NYCFC entered MLS in 2015, the league had no reserve competition. For their first few seasons NYCFC affiliated with Wilmington Hammerheads FC and then with San Antonio FC but these partnerships were little used and the club continued with no minor league affiliate for several seasons afterwards.

=== MLS Next Pro ===
On December 6, 2021, Major League Soccer announced the formation of a new league, MLS Next Pro, which would be a competitive development league for reserves and younger players. It would be placed in the third tier of the United States soccer league system below the USL Championship, which had previously hosted affiliated and reserve teams. NYCFC was among the first teams to announce their participation in MLS Next Pro. The name of the team—New York City FC II (abbreviated as "NYCFC II")—was announced in January 2022 alongside the signing of the first three homegrown players to stock the nascent team's roster.

In August 2026, NYCFC President Brad Sims said he and the team were working with Hometown Soccer Holdings, a venture between MLS and a private equity group, to have the group take over the commercial side of the team. It was later reported the team would be rebranding and relocating to Edison, New Jersey sometime in the near future. On September 10, New Jersey Next Pro announced Brady O'Connor as its first president.

== Players and staff ==
=== Roster ===
As of May 9, 2026

No.	Pos.	Nation	Player
2	DF	USA	Nico Cavallo
15	DF	USA	Kevin Pierre Jr.
23	DF	USA	Max Murray
29	MF	USA	Máximo Carrizo
30	GK	ESA	Tomás Romero
31	GK	USA	Mac Learned
32	MF	USA	Jonathan Shore
38	DF	USA	Drew Baiera
44	MF	USA	Luka Sunjic
45	DF	USA	Kamram Acito
46	MF	USA	Gil de Souza
52	DF	JAM	Kieran Smith
53	DF	BRA	João Loiola (on loan from Fluminense FC)
57	MF	USA	Joe Suchecki
58	DF	USA	Eóin Martin
59	DF	USA	Dylan Randazzo
68	FW	USA	Henrik Hvatum
71	MF	USA	Peter Molinari
75	MF	USA	Drew Kerr
77	DF	USA	Jonny Lopez
79	FW	GHA	Caleb Danquah
80	GK	USA	Brennan Klein
81	MF	ITA	Sebastiano Musu
82	DF	ESA	Adonis Campos
83	MF	USA	Camilo Ponce
87	FW	ESP	Arnau Farnós
88	FW	SLE	Malachi Jones
90	GK	USA	Dylan McDermott
91	MF	USA	Uriel Zeitz
92	FW	USA	Lucas De Pinho
93	MF	USA	El Haji Samb
97	MF	USA	David Duque
99	FW	JAM	Seymour Reid
—	MF	ESP	Arnau Rabassa

New York City FC MLS roster player
New York City FC academy player

=== Technical Staff ===
Position	Name
Head coach	Matt Pilkington
Assistant coach	Michael Dal Pra
Goalkeeper coach	Santiago Restrepo
Analyst	Gustavo Mahana
Athletic Trainer	Camilo Hurtado-Cortes
Performance Coach	Casey Colon

== Records ==
=== Year-by-year ===
Season	MLS Next Pro									Playoffs	Top Scorer	
Season	P	W	D	L	GF	GA	Pts	Conference	Overall	Playoffs	Player	Goals
2022	24	9	6	9	49	35	37	5th, Eastern	10th	Did not qualify	(United States) John Denis	14
2023	28	12	4	12	60	55	41	8th, Eastern	16th	Did not qualify	(United States) MD Myers	19
2024	28	11	9	8	60	58	46	6th, Eastern	11th	Conference Quarterfinals	(United States) Taylor Calheira	14
2025	28	9	6	13	53	61	35	12th, Eastern	24th	Did not qualify	(Jamaica) Seymour Reid	13
2026	28	13	5	10	50	44	47	6th, Eastern	10th	Conference Quarterfinals	(United States) Cooper Flax	9

=== Head coaches record ===
As of September 24, 2023

Name	Nationality	From	To	P	W	D	L	GF	GA	Win%
Matt Pilkington	England	February 9, 2022	present	52	21	10	21	109	90	40.38

== Stadium ==
On February 24, 2022, it was announced that NYCFC II would play its home matches at Belson Stadium on the campus of St. John's University.

On July 15, 2024, NYCFC II announced that would play a portion of its schedule at Icahn Stadium on Randalls Island in Manhattan. The club made a $3 million donation to fund upgrades to bring the pitch up to professional soccer standards.
