= Wilder Cartagena =

Peruvian footballer (born 1994)

- Cartagena with Orlando City in 2026

Personal information
- Full name: Wilder José Cartagena Mendoza
- Date of birth: 23 September 1994 (age 32)
- Place of birth: El Carmen, Ica, Peru
- Height: 1.80 m (5 ft 11 in)
- Position: Defensive midfielder

Team information
- Current team: Orlando City
- Number: 16

Youth career
- 2012: Alianza Lima

Senior career*
Years	Team	Apps	(Gls)
2012–2014	Alianza Lima	24	(1)
2014–2015	Vitória de Setúbal	0	(0)
2015–2018	Universidad San Martín	100	(3)
2018–2019	Veracruz	25	(0)
2019	Alianza Lima	30	(0)
2020–2021	Godoy Cruz	17	(3)
2021–2023	Kalba FC	22	(0)
2022–2023	→ Orlando City (loan)	35	(2)
2022	→ Orlando City B (loan)	1	(1)
2024–	Orlando City	45	(0)

International career^{‡}
2011	Peru U17	4	(0)
2013	Peru U20	8	(0)
2018–	Peru	44	(0)
- * Club domestic league appearances and goals as of 23:40, 7 November 2026 (UTC) ‡ National team caps and goals as of 02:20, 7 October 2026 (UTC)

Wilder José Cartagena Mendoza (born 23 September 1994) is a Peruvian professional footballer who plays as a defensive midfielder for Major League Soccer club Orlando City and the Peru national team.

Cartagena began as a goalkeeper, but was switched to the midfield while in the youth ranks of Alianza Lima. In 2012, he made his professional debut for Alianza Lima and in 2014 moved to Portugal to play for Vitória de Setúbal, but he failed to make an appearance for the Portuguese club. In 2015, Cartagena returned to Peru, where he signed with Universiad San Martín, with whom he made 100 league appearances across three seasons. In 2018, Cartagena signed with Mexican club Veracruz, with whom he played a single season for, before returning to Alianza Lima. In 2020, Cartagena joined Argentinian club Godoy Cruz, but he made only infrequent appearances with the club. In mid-2021, Cartagena joined Emirati club Kalba FC before being sent on loan to Major League Soccer club Orlando City a year later. A season later, Cartagena signed a permanent deal with Orlando City.

== Early life ==
Cartagena spent most of his free time playing football on the streets and on a bad pitch. El Carmen was badly affected by an earthquake that collapsed Cartagena's school, which forced him to go study in Lima. While studying in Lima he made friends who were playing youth football with various clubs and it was there he tried out for Alianza Lima and was accepted. Cartagena started out playing as a goalkeeper for Alianza Lima, but following a scrimmage between his school, which he did not play as a goalkeeper for, and the academy of Alianza Lima, the club moved him into midfield.

== Club career ==
=== Alianza Lima ===
Wilder Cartagena was promoted to the Alianza Lima first team in January 2012. He soon made his Torneo Descentralizado league debut on matchday one in a 2–2 home draw against León de Huánuco. He was used again as a starter by manager José Soto on matchday 27 in away match against Juan Aurich.

In the 2013 season, Cartagena made many more appearances for the senior side. On 30 November, Cartagena scored his first senior goal for the club when he equalized in a match against UCV, helping the match to end 1–1.

=== Vitória de Setúbal ===
On 21 January 2014, Cartagena signed a contract through June 2015 with Primeira Liga club Vitória Setúbal. Cartagena spoke about how he wished to establish himself at the club and that he hoped his performance at the club would improve his chances to be called up to the Peru senior team. However, Cartagena failed to make an appearance for the club and only was put on the bench once during a match on 28 September against Nacional, which Vitória won 2–0.

=== Universidad San Martín ===
On 12 January 2015, Cartagena returned to Peru and joined Torneo Descentralizado club Universidad San Martín due to a lack of playing opportunities at Vitória Setúbal, signing a one year contract. On 15 February, Cartagena made his debut for the club at Cienciano in the Torneo del Inca in a match that ended in a 1–0 loss. At the conclusion of the 2015 season, Cartagena had his contract renewed through the 2016 season.

On 5 July 2016, Cartagena scored his first goal for the club and the second of his senior career, again against UCV, in a match that ended in a 2–2 draw. At the conclusion of the 2016 season, Cartagena once again had his contract renewed for another season.

In the 2017 season, Cartagena made the most appearances of his career up to that point in a single season, logging 38 appearances and one goal.

=== Veracruz ===
On 7 January 2018, Cartagena was announced as a Liga MX club Veracruz signing. On 28 January, Cartagena made his debut for the club in a 1–1 draw against Santos Laguna and played the full match. In total, Cartagena would make just 13 appearances for the club across the 2017–18 season.

In the following season, Cartagena made one less appearance in the league, but he made his Copa MX debut in a 3–0 loss at Club América.

=== Return to Alianza Lima ===
On 5 January 2019, Cartagena rejoined Alianza Lima in the Peruvian Primeira División on a one year deal. On 15 February, Cartagena made his first appearance for the club since his return in a 3–0 win over Sport Boys. On 6 March, Cartagena made his senior international cup debut in the Copa Libertadores against Argentinian club River Plate, resulting in a 1–1 draw. In total, Cartagena made 30 domestic appearances and five international appearances for his first club across the 2019 season, but he did not sign a new contract with the club.

=== Godoy Cruz ===
On 21 January 2020, Cartagena was announced as an Argentine Primera División club Godoy Cruz signing. On 23 February, Cartagena made his debut for the club in a 3–0 loss at Boca Juniors, playing the full match. Six days later, Cartagena scored his first goal for the club, the opening goal of a 3–1 loss to Unión. On 14 March, Cartagena made his first and only Copa de la Superliga appearance in a 4–1 loss to Boca Juniors. Cartagena would only make five appearances across all competitions for the club in the 2020 season.

In the following season, Cartagena would only make two more appearances in two Godoy Cruz losses.

In the 2022 season, Cartagena began to make regular appearances for the club again, making 11 appearances and scoring two more goals before he left the club.

=== Kalba FC ===
On 28 July 2021, Cartagena was announced as a UAE Pro League club Kalba FC signing. On 20 August, Cartagena made his debut for the club in a 1–0 loss at Sharjah FC. On 25 October, Cartagena made his UAE League Cup debut in a 1–0 loss at Al Orooba. Across the 2021–22 season, Cartagena made 25 appearances across all competitions.

==== Loan to Orlando City ====
On 2 August 2022, Cartegena joined Major League Soccer club Orlando City on loan from the remainder of the 2022 season with an option to extend through 2023. On 13 August, Cartagena made his debut for the club when he came on as a 91st-minute substitute for Facundo Torres in a 1–0 victory at the New York Red Bulls. Four days later, Cartagena made a single appearance with Orlando City's reserve affiliate Orlando City B against Rochester New York in which he scored the third goal of a 5–2 victory.

On 30 July 2023, Cartagena scored his first goal for the club in a Leagues Cup match against Santos Laguna. Cartagena's goal, which was scored in added time, allowed Orlando City to progress to the knockout state of the competition. On 2 September, during a match against FC Cincinnati, Cartagena was involved in a scuffle with the opposition players in which he received a red card for his role. Cartagena was fined four days later by the MLS Disciplinary Committee for failing to leave the pitch in a timely manner after his ejection. On 30 October, Cartagena scored his first MLS Cup playoffs goal in the first round of Orlando City's series with Nashville SC when he struck the ball from outside the penalty box and hit the ball on the underside of the crossbar and into the goal to help Orlando to a 1–0 win.

Cartagena in 2026

=== Orlando City ===
Cartagena was acquired by the club permanently on 14 December 2023 with a guaranteed contract through 2025. On 20 May, Cartagena was named to the Team of the Matchday for his performance in a 1–0 win over Austin FC two days earlier. In the 2024 season, Cartagena made the most appearances in his senior career across an entire season for a single club, registering 39 appearances across all competitions.

On 25 January 2025, Cartagena suffered an injury to his left achilles tendon in a preseason friendly match against Atlético Mineiro. Four days later, Cartagena underwent a successful surgery to repair his tendon, but he was placed onto the season-ending injury list. On 12 November, despite missing the entire season through injury, Cartagena signed a one-year contract with a club option for 2027.

Cartagena returned from injury in Orlando City's season-opening match against the New York Red Bulls on 21 February 2026, but was taken off in the 14th-minute of the game due to an injury. On 25 April, Cartagena again returned from injury, this time as a second-half substitute in a 3–2 loss to D.C. United.

== International career ==
=== Youth ===
Cartagena was called up by manager Juan José Oré to the Peru U17 team to participate in the 2011 South American U-17 Championship in Ecuador. On 12 March 2011, Cartagena made his international debut in the tournament in a 4–2 loss to Argentina in which he played the entire match. Peru were eventually eliminated after placing fourth in Group A, one spot below third which would've seen the team advance to the final round of the tournament.

Cartagena was called up to the Peru U20 for the 2013 South American Youth Football Championship in Argentina by manager Daniel Ahmed. Cartagena made his debut for the team on 10 January 2013 in a 3–3 draw with Uruguay and he once again played the full match. Peru placed first in Group B, allowing the team to advance to the final round, but they placed fifth out of six teams.

=== Senior ===
Cartagena received his first senior team call-up by Ricardo Gareca for friendlies against Scotland, Saudi Arabia, and Sweden ahead of the 2018 FIFA World Cup in Russia. Cartagena made his debut as an 84th-minute substitute for Renato Tapia in a 2–0 win over Scotland on 29 May 2018. On 4 June, Gareca named Cartagena to the squad that would compete in the World Cup. On 26 June, Cartagena made his World Cup debut and only appearance of the tournament when he came on as a 79th-minute substitute for André Carrillo in a 2–0 win over Australia. Peru's victory over Australia marked their first win at a World Cup since 1978 over Iran, but they were eliminated in the group stage.

Cartagena was called up by Ricardo Gareca for the 2021 Copa América in Brazil on 10 June 2021. On 21 June, Cartagena made his tournament debut when he came on as a 83rd-minute substitute for Sergio Peña in a 2–1 win over Colombia. Peru would advance to the knockout stage of the tournament but were eliminated by hosts Brazil in the semi-finals and lose to Colombia in the third place match.

On 15 June 2024, Cartagena was called up by Jorge Fossati for the 2024 Copa América in the United States. Cartagena played in all three matches of the group stage, but the Peruvians were eliminated after placing last in Group A.

== Personal life ==
Cartagena has a daughter. Cartagena described his relationship with former Orlando City player Pedro Gallese as a "brotherhood" as they have played for the same clubs in the past and their families are very close together.

== Career statistics ==
=== Club ===
As of match played 7 November 2026

Appearances and goals by club, season and competition
Club	Season	League			National cup (Note: Includes Copa Inca, Copa MX, Copa de la Superliga, UAE League Cup, and U.S. Open Cup)		Continental (Note: Includes Copa Libertadores and CONCACAF Champions Cup)		Other (Note: Includes MLS Cup Playoffs and Leagues Cup)		Total	
Club	Season	Division	Apps	Goals	Apps	Goals	Apps	Goals	Apps	Goals	Apps	Goals
Alianza Lima	2012	Torneo Descentralizado	3	0	—		—		—		3	0
Alianza Lima	2013	Torneo Descentralizado	21	1	—		—		—		21	1
Alianza Lima	Total		24	1	0	0	0	0	0	0	24	1
Vitória de Setúbal	2014–15	Primeira Liga	0	0	0	0	—		—		0	0
Universidad San Martín	2015	Torneo Descentralizado	25	0	9	0	—		—		34	0
Universidad San Martín	2016	Torneo Descentralizado	37	2	—		—		—		37	2
Universidad San Martín	2017	Torneo Descentralizado	38	1	—		—		—		38	1
Universidad San Martín	Total		100	3	0	0	0	0	0	0	109	3
Veracruz	2017–18	Liga MX	13	0	0	0	—		—		13	0
Veracruz	2018–19	Liga MX	12	0	1	0	—		—		13	0
Veracruz	Total		25	0	1	0	0	0	0	0	26	0
Alianza Lima	2019	Peruvian Primera División	30	0	0	0	5	0	—		35	0
Godoy Cruz	2019–20	Argentine Primera División	4	1	1	0	—		—		5	1
Godoy Cruz	2021	Argentine Primera División	2	0	0	0	—		—		2	0
Godoy Cruz	2022	Argentine Primera División	11	2	0	0	—		—		11	2
Godoy Cruz	Total		17	3	1	0	0	0	0	0	18	3
Kalba FC	2021–22	UAE Pro League	22	0	3	0	—		—		25	0
Orlando City B (loan)	2022	MLS Next Pro	1	1	—		—		—		1	1
Orlando City (loan)	2022	Major League Soccer	8	0	1	0	—		0	0	9	0
Orlando City (loan)	2023	Major League Soccer	27	2	1	0	1	0	6 (Note: Three appearances and one goal in Leagues Cup and three appearances and one goal in MLS Cup playoffs)	2	35	4
Orlando City	2024	Major League Soccer	27	0	—		4	0	7 (Note: Three appearances in Leagues Cup and four appearances in MLS Cup Playoffs)	0	38	0
Orlando City	2025	Major League Soccer	0	0	0	0	—		0	0	0	0
Orlando City	2026	Major League Soccer	18	0	2	0	—		3 (Note: Appearances in Leagues Cup)	0	23	0
Orlando City	Orlando City total		80	2	4	0	5	0	16	2	105	4
Career total			299	10	18	0	10	0	16	2	344	12

=== International ===
As of match played 6 October 2026

Appearances and goals by national team and year
National team	Year	Apps	Goals
Peru	2017	2	0
Peru	2018	3	0
Peru	2020	1	0
Peru	2021	10	0
Peru	2022	5	0
Peru	2023	8	0
Peru	2024	11	0
Peru	2026	4	0
Total		44	0

== Honours ==
Orlando City

- U.S. Open Cup: 2022
