= 2024 Orlando City SC season =

Season of American association football team

Orlando City SC
2024 season
- Manager: Óscar Pareja
- Stadium: Inter&Co Stadium
- MLS: Conference: 4th Overall: 9th
- MLS Cup Playoffs: Conference final
- U.S. Open Cup: Did not enter
- CONCACAF Champions Cup: Round of 16
- Leagues Cup: Round of 32
- Top goalscorer: League: Facundo Torres (14); All: Facundo Torres (20)
- Highest home attendance: 25,055 (Nov 24 vs. Atlanta United FC, Playoffs)
- Lowest home attendance: League: 20,985 (March 23 vs. Austin FC); All: 15,662 (August 4 vs. Atlético San Luis, Leagues Cup)
- Average home league attendance: 22,804
Home colors	Away colors

The 2024 Orlando City SC season was the club's 14th season of existence in Orlando and 10th season as a Major League Soccer franchise, the top-flight league in the United States soccer league system. Orlando also played in two other competitions: the Leagues Cup and the CONCACAF Champions Cup. As a result of a decision by Major League Soccer, Orlando City did not contest the U.S. Open Cup for the first time in club history.

In December 2023, head coach Óscar Pareja signed a two-year contract extension through 2025. Executives Luiz Muzzi and Ricardo Moreira also signed new two-year contracts in February 2024.

After four-and-a-half seasons under the Exploria sponsorship name, Orlando City's home stadium was rebranded as Inter&Co Stadium ahead of the 2024 season.

Orlando introduced a new road jersey called the "Legacy Kit" in celebration of the team's 10th year in MLS. It featured a commemorative crest based on the previous USL franchise's three-lion design, as well as red accents in recognition of Orlando City's original red jersey. The words "honor thy history" are written on the inside of the neckline and a jock tag at the bottom of the shirt carries the Roman numeral X.

== Roster ==
Last updated on September 20, 2024

No.	Nationality	Name	Position(s)	Date of birth (age)	Previous club	Notes
Goalkeepers
1	(Peru)	Pedro Gallese	GK	February 23, 1990 (aged 33)	(Mexico) Veracruz	INT
31	(United States)	Mason Stajduhar	GK	December 2, 1997 (aged 26)	(United States) Orlando City U-23	HGP
50	(Venezuela)	Javier Otero	GK	November 18, 2002 (aged 21)	(United States) Orlando City B	HGP
99	(United States)	Carlos Mercado	GK	September 27, 1999 (aged 24)	(United States) Orlando City B	–
Defenders
3	(Brazil)	Rafael Santos	LB	February 5, 1998 (aged 26)	(Brazil) Cruzeiro	INT
4	(Slovenia)	David Brekalo	CB	December 3, 1998 (aged 25)	(Norway) Viking FK	INT
6	(Sweden)	Robin Jansson	CB	November 15, 1991 (aged 32)	(Sweden) AIK	–
15	(Argentina)	Rodrigo Schlegel	CB	April 3, 1997 (aged 26)	(Argentina) Racing Club	INT
17	(Iceland)	Dagur Dan Thórhallsson	RB	May 2, 2000 (aged 23)	(Iceland) Breiðablik	INT
20	(Canada)	Luca Petrasso	LB	June 16, 2000 (aged 23)	(Canada) Toronto FC	HGP
24	(United States)	Kyle Smith	RB	January 9, 1992 (aged 32)	(United States) Louisville City	–
26	(United States)	Michael Halliday	RB	January 22, 2003 (aged 21)	(United States) Orlando City B	HGP
29	(United States)	Tahir Reid-Brown	RB	July 2, 2006 (aged 17)	(United States) Orlando City B	HGP
30	(United States)	Alex Freeman	RB	August 9, 2004 (aged 19)	(United States) Orlando City Academy	HGP
68	(United States)	Thomas Williams	CB	August 15, 2004 (aged 19)	(United States) Orlando City B	HGP
Midfielders
5	(Uruguay)	César Araújo	CM	April 2, 2001 (aged 22)	(Uruguay) Montevideo Wanderers	U22, INT
8	(Brazil)	Felipe Martins	CM	September 30, 1990 (aged 33)	(United States) Austin FC	–
14	(Uruguay)	Nicolás Lodeiro	AM	March 21, 1989 (aged 34)	(United States) Seattle Sounders FC	–
16	(Peru)	Wilder Cartagena	DM	September 23, 1994 (aged 29)	(United Arab Emirates) Al-Ittihad Kalba	INT
18	(Norway)	Heine Gikling Bruseth	CM	April 6, 2004 (aged 19)	(Norway) Kristiansund BK	INT
33	(United States)	Jeorgio Kocevski	CM	August 19, 2002 (aged 21)	(United States) Syracuse Orange	–
95	(Chile)	Favian Loyola	AM	May 18, 2005 (aged 18)	(United States) Orlando City B	HGP
Forwards
7	(Argentina)	Ramiro Enrique	CF	May 4, 2001 (aged 22)	(Argentina) Banfield	U22, INT
9	(Colombia)	Luis Muriel	CF	April 16, 1991 (aged 32)	(Italy) Atalanta	DP
10	(Uruguay)	Facundo Torres	LW	April 13, 2000 (aged 23)	(Uruguay) Peñarol	DP
11	(Argentina)	Martín Ojeda	LW	November 27, 1998 (aged 25)	(Argentina) Godoy Cruz	DP, INT
13	(United States)	Duncan McGuire	ST	February 5, 2001 (aged 23)	(United States) Creighton Bluejays	–
23	(Ghana)	Shak Mohammed	ST	August 27, 2003 (aged 20)	(United States) Duke Blue Devils	GA
27	(United States)	Jack Lynn	ST	january 12 2001 age24	(United States) Orlando City B	–
34	(Japan)	Yutaro Tsukada	LW	July 28, 2001 (aged 22)	(United States) Orlando City B	–
77	(Colombia)	Iván Angulo	LW	March 22, 1999 (aged 24)	(Brazil) Palmeiras	INT

== Staff ==
Executive
Majority owner and chairman	(United States) Mark Wilf
Majority owner and vice-chair	(United States) Zygi Wilf
Majority owner and vice-chair	(United States) Leonard Wilf
President of business operations	(United States) Jarrod Dillon
General manager	(Brazil) Luiz Muzzi
Technical director	(Brazil) Ricardo Moreira
Coaching staff
Head coach	(Colombia) Óscar Pareja
First assistant coach	(Mexico) Diego Torres Ortiz
Second assistant coach	(Argentina) Martín Perelman
Strength and conditioning coach	(Argentina) Fabian Bazán
Goalkeeping coach	(Venezuela) César Baena

== Competitions ==
=== Friendlies ===
Orlando City opened preseason camp on January 15. Six friendly matches were scheduled with all but one to be played behind closed doors.

January 27 Florida Cup	Orlando City SC	1–1	Flamengo	Orlando, Florida
2:00 pm	Angulo 41'	Report	Pedro 13'	Stadium: Inter&Co Stadium

February 4 Preseason	Orlando City SC	3–1	FIU Panthers	Port St. Lucie, Florida
		Report
Note: Closed-door scrimmage

February 7 Preseason	Orlando City SC	3–1	Rhode Island FC	Kissimmee, Florida
	Lynn 43', 50'; Unknown 87' (o.g.)	Report	Trialist 84'	Stadium: Osceola County Stadium
Note: Closed-door scrimmage

February 10 Preseason	Orlando City SC	3–1	New England Revolution	Orlando, Florida
	Torres 20', 50'; Cartagena 62'	Report	Polster 2'	Stadium: Inter&Co Stadium
Note: Limited capacity seating (Society XXI members)

February 14 Preseason	Orlando City SC	1–0	Houston Dynamo FC	Kissimmee, Florida
	Ojeda 37'	Report		Stadium: Osceola County Stadium
Note: Closed-door scrimmage

February 17 Preseason	Orlando City SC	3–2	Colorado Rapids	Kissimmee, Florida
	Smith 1'; Torres 10' (pen.); Kocevski 90'	Report	Navarro 64' (pen.); Cabral 78'	Stadium: Osceola County Stadium
Note: Closed-door scrimmage

=== Major League Soccer ===
Results summary

Overall								Home						Away					
Pld	W	D	L	GF	GA	GD	Pts	W	D	L	GF	GA	GD	W	D	L	GF	GA	GD
34	15	7	12	59	50	+9	52	7	4	6	28	18	+10	8	3	6	31	32	−1

Last updated: October 19, 2024.
Source: Match reports

Round	1	2	3	4	5	6	7	8	9	10	11	12	13	14	15	16	17	18	19	20	21	22	23	24	25	26	27	28	29	30	31	32	33	34
Stadium	H	A	H	A	H	H	A	A	H	H	A	H	A	H	A	A	H	A	H	A	A	H	A	A	H	A	H	H	H	A	A	H	A	H
Result	D	L	L	L	W	D	W	D	L	L	W	D	W	L	D	L	L	D	W	L	W	W	W	W	D	L	W	W	W	L	W	W	W	L
Position (Note: ORL's position at the end of the matchweek, not their match.)	8	12	13	14	13	13	13	12	13	14	11	11	10	10	11	11	14	14	10	10	10	7	7	7	7	7	7	5	4	5	4	4	4	4

Updated to match(es) played on October 19, 2024. Source: Match reports
A = Away; H = Home; W = Win; D = Draw; L = Loss

Results

February 24 1	Orlando City SC	0–0	CF Montréal	Orlando, Florida
7:30 pm	Cartagena (yellow card) 31'; McGuire (yellow card) 45+3'; Felipe (yellow card) 90'	Report	Lassiter (yellow card) 36'	Stadium: Inter&Co Stadium; Attendance: 24,249; Referee: Rafael Santos

March 2 2	Inter Miami CF	5–0	Orlando City SC	Fort Lauderdale, Florida
4:30 pm	Suárez 4', 11'; Taylor 29'; Gómez (yellow card) 51'; Messi 57', 62'; Campana (yellow card) 83'; Allen (yellow card) 86'	Report	Jansson (yellow card) 33'	Stadium: Chase Stadium; Attendance: 21,352; Referee: Jaime Herrera

March 9 3	Orlando City SC	2–3	Minnesota United FC	Orlando, Florida
7:30 pm	McGuire 1', 83'; Martins (yellow card) 34'; Cartagena (red card) FT	Report	Pukki 4', 38'; Trapp (yellow card) 32'; Boxall (yellow card) 43'; Taylor (yellow card) 70'; Arriaga (yellow card) 79'; St. Clair (yellow card) 90+2'; Hlongwane 90+5', (yellow card) 90+6'; Rosales (red card) FT	Stadium: Inter&Co Stadium; Attendance: 23,025; Referee: Wilmer Pino Mercado

March 17 4	Atlanta United FC	2–0	Orlando City SC	Atlanta, Georgia
7:00 pm	Lobjanidze 9'; Wiley (yellow card) 23'; Muyumba (yellow card) 45+1'; Silva (yellow card) 51'; Giakoumakis 70'; Guzan (yellow card) 73'; Almada (yellow card) 90+6'	Report	Jansson (yellow card) 49'	Stadium: Mercedes-Benz Stadium; Attendance: 42,631; Referee: Cristian Campo Hernandez

March 23 5	Orlando City SC	2–0	Austin FC	Orlando, Florida
7:30 pm	Lynn 42'; Lodeiro 64'; Smith (yellow card) 80'	Report		Stadium: Inter&Co Stadium; Attendance: 20,985; Referee: Esteban Rosano

March 30 6	Orlando City SC	1–1	New York Red Bulls	Orlando, Florida
7:30 pm	Angulo (yellow card) 75'; Eile 89' (o.g.)	Report	Morgan 21'; Stroud (yellow card) 44'; Reyes (yellow card) 45+5'; Duncan (yellow card) 73'	Stadium: Inter&Co Stadium; Attendance: 23,859; Referee: Victor Rivas

April 13 7	D.C. United	2–3	Orlando City SC	Washington, D.C.
7:30 pm	Benteke 5', (yellow card) 88'; Herrera (yellow card) 42'; Antley (yellow card) 45'; Dájome (yellow card) 45+2'; Hopkins (yellow card) 45+4'; Klich (yellow card) 49'; Pirani 66'	Report	Thórhallsson 28', (yellow card) 55'; Cartagena (yellow card) 42'; Brekalo (yellow card) 55', (goal) 82'; McGuire 90+1'	Stadium: Audi Field; Attendance: 18,615; Referee: Guido Gonzales, Jr.

April 20 8	CF Montréal	2–2	Orlando City SC	Montreal, Quebec, Canada
7:30 pm	Sosa (yellow card) 10'; Toye 16'; Sirois (yellow card) 20'; Waterman (yellow card) 77'; Lassiter (yellow card) 86', (goal) 88'	Report	Jansson (yellow card) 8'; Torres 22' (pen.); Araújo (yellow card) 62'; Angulo 90+2'	Stadium: Saputo Stadium; Attendance: 19,619; Referee: Jon Freemon

April 27 9	Orlando City SC	1–2	Toronto FC	Orlando, Florida
7:30 pm	McGuire 37', (yellow card) 55'; Araújo (yellow card) 67'; Lodeiro (yellow card) 75'; Schlegel (yellow card) 81'	Report	Gomis (yellow card) 11'; Owusu (yellow card) 50', (goal) 90'; Petretta (yellow card) 57'; Spicer 87'; Johnson (yellow card) 90+3'	Stadium: Inter&Co Stadium; Attendance: 21,689; Referee: Armando Villarreal

May 4 10	Orlando City SC	0–1	FC Cincinnati	Orlando, Florida
7:30 pm	Schlegel (red card) 23'; Araújo (yellow card) 30'; Cartagena (yellow card) 62'; Jansson (yellow card) 64'; Halliday (yellow card) 90+1'	Report	Acosta 1'; Halsey (yellow card) 56' (yellow-red card) 78'; Murphy (yellow card) 66'; Valenzuela (yellow card) 90'	Stadium: Inter&Co Stadium; Attendance: 21,218; Referee: Ismail Elfath

May 11 11	Philadelphia Union	2–3	Orlando City SC	Chester, Pennsylvania
7:30 pm	Uhre 12'; Gazdag 66' (pen.); Lowe (yellow card) 81'	Report	McGuire 21', (yellow card) 90'; Muriel 41', 46'; Angulo (yellow card) 45+5'; Araújo (yellow card) 87'	Stadium: Subaru Park; Attendance: 19,028; Referee: Timothy Ford

May 15 12	Orlando City SC	0–0	Inter Miami CF	Orlando, Florida
7:30 pm	Muriel (yellow card) 71'; Araújo (yellow card) 72'	Report	Cremaschi (yellow card) 57'; Taylor (yellow card) 65'; Freire (yellow card) 79'	Stadium: Inter&Co Stadium; Attendance: 25,046; Referee: Rosendo Mendoza

May 18 13	San Jose Earthquakes	0–1	Orlando City SC	San Jose, California
10:30 pm	Costa (yellow card) 70'; Espinoza (yellow card) 90+5'	Report	Lynn 89'	Stadium: PayPal Park; Attendance: 14,172; Referee: Malik Badawi

May 25 14	Orlando City SC	0–2	Columbus Crew	Orlando, Florida
7:30 pm	Araújo (yellow card) 45'; Felipe (yellow card) 89'	Report	Rossi 45+1' (pen.), 61'; Camacho (yellow card) 56'; Schulte (yellow card) 70'	Stadium: Inter&Co Stadium; Attendance: 21,726; Referee: Jair Marrufo

May 29 15	Chicago Fire FC	1–1	Orlando City SC	Chicago, Illinois
8:30 pm	Navarro (yellow card) 47'; Gutiérrez (yellow card) 54'; Cuypers 70'; Dean (yellow card) 90+2'	Report	Torres 4'; Jansson (yellow card) 45+5'	Stadium: Soldier Field; Attendance: 11,372; Referee: Malik Badawi

June 1 16	New York Red Bulls	1–0	Orlando City SC	Harrison, New Jersey
7:30 pm	Tolkin 38'; Edelman (yellow card) 61'	Report	Angulo (yellow card) 86'	Stadium: Red Bull Arena; Attendance: 18,039; Referee: Drew Fischer

June 15 17	Orlando City SC	1–3	Los Angeles FC	Orlando, Florida
7:30 pm	Thórhallsson (yellow card) 66'; Ojeda 68'	Report	Bouanga 45', 86', (yellow card) 56'; Bogusz 80'	Stadium: Inter&Co Stadium; Attendance: 22,563; Referee: Rubiel Vazquez

June 19 18	Charlotte FC	2–2	Orlando City SC	Charlotte, North Carolina
7:30 pm	Vargas 11'; Arfield (red card) 38'; Bronico 77'; Byrne (yellow card) 90+1'	Report	McGuire (yellow card) 27', (goal) 63'; Torres (yellow card) 50', (goal) 81'	Stadium: Bank of America Stadium; Attendance: 28,301; Referee: Allen Chapman

June 22 19	Orlando City SC	4–2	Chicago Fire FC	Orlando, Florida
7:30 pm	Torres 4', 60'; Muriel 20' (pen.); Angulo 29'; Araújo (yellow card) 83'	Report	Cuypers (yellow card) 46', (goal) 69'; Haile-Selassie 53' (pen.)	Stadium: Inter&Co Stadium; Attendance: 22,038; Referee: Natalie Simon

June 28 20	New York City FC	4–2	Orlando City SC	New York, New York
7:30 pm	Rodríguez 15'; Wolf 45+4'; A. Ojeda 45+12'; Freese (yellow card) 78'; Thiago (yellow card) 78'; Bakrar 90+4'	Report	Thórhallsson 72'; McGuire 90+1'	Stadium: Yankee Stadium; Attendance: 21,497; Referee: Sergii Boiko

July 3 21	Toronto FC	1–2	Orlando City SC	Toronto, Ontario, Canada
7:30 pm	Etienne Jr. 5'; Petretta (yellow card) 63'; Flores (yellow card) 71'; O'Neill (yellow card) 75'; Insigne (yellow card) 90+5'	Report	Ojeda 27'; Gomis 45' (o.g.); Cartagena (yellow card) 75'; Gallese (yellow card) 79'; Enrique (yellow card) 88'	Stadium: BMO Field; Attendance: 23,877; Referee: Mark Allatin

July 6 22	Orlando City SC	5–0	D.C. United	Orlando, Florida
7:30 pm	Ojeda 19'; Jansson 23'; Angulo 42'; Torres 74'; Enrique 85'	Report	Bartlett (red card) 45+2'; Sargis (yellow card) 64'	Stadium: Inter&Co Stadium; Attendance: 22,561; Referee: Lukasz Szpala

July 13 23	New England Revolution	1–3	Orlando City SC	Foxborough, Massachusetts
7:30 pm	Vrioni 23'; Harkes (yellow card) 68'	Report	Jansson (yellow card) 50'; Torres 51', 81'; Enrique 58'; Schlegel (yellow card) 77'	Stadium: Gillette Stadium; Attendance: 24,193; Referee: Sergii Boiko

July 17 24	Nashville SC	0–3	Orlando City SC	Nashville, Tennessee
8:30 pm	Muyl (yellow card) 18'; Bauer (yellow card) 29'; Ajago (yellow card) 88'	Report	Araújo 19'; Thórhallsson (yellow card) 22'; Muyl 40' (o.g.); Torres (yellow card) 64'; Enrique 81'	Stadium: Geodis Park; Attendance: 29,070; Referee: Pierre-Luc Lauziere

July 20 25	Orlando City SC	1–1	New York City FC	Orlando, Florida
7:30 pm	Araújo (yellow card) 13'; Enrique 52'	Report	Sands (yellow card) 42'; Wolf 57', (yellow card) 71'; Tanasijević (yellow card) 70'; Haak (yellow card) 90+6'	Stadium: Inter&Co Stadium; Attendance: 22,827; Referee: Joe Dickerson

August 24 26	Sporting Kansas City	3–0	Orlando City SC	Kansas City, Kansas
8:30 pm	Davis 44'; Agada (yellow card) 51' (red card) 70'; Sallói 52'; Walter 90+2'; Russell (yellow card) 90+9'	Report	Santos (yellow card) 84'; Enrique (yellow card) 90'	Stadium: Children's Mercy Park; Attendance: 17,383; Referee: Timothy Ford

August 31 27	Orlando City SC	3–0	Nashville SC	Orlando, Florida
7:30 pm	Angulo 10'; Torres 14', 85'; Schlegel (yellow card) 17'; Enrique (yellow card) 20'; Jansson (yellow card) 39'; Santos (yellow card) 47'; Cartagena (yellow card) 64'; Araújo (yellow card) 83'	Report	Anunga (yellow card) 68'	Stadium: Inter&Co Stadium; Attendance: 22,853; Referee: Victor Rivas

September 14 28	Orlando City SC	3–0	New England Revolution	Orlando, Florida
7:30 pm	Santos 22'; Torres 45+2' (pen.); Cartagena (yellow card) 52'; Enrique (yellow card) 68'; McGuire 74'	Report	Parker (yellow card) 37'; Boateng (yellow card) 78'; Bajraktarević (yellow card) 90+3'	Stadium: Inter&Co Stadium; Attendance: 22,062; Referee: Tori Penso

September 18 29	Orlando City SC	2–0	Charlotte FC	Orlando, Florida
7:30 pm	Ojeda (yellow card) 22'; Thórhallsson (yellow card) 42'; Torres 52'; Araújo (yellow card) 83'; McGuire 89'; Muriel (yellow card) 90+8'	Report	Bronico (yellow card) 36'	Stadium: Inter&Co Stadium; Attendance: 22,902; Referee: Marcos DeOliveira II

September 21 30	Columbus Crew	4–3	Orlando City SC	Columbus, Ohio
7:30 pm	Rossi 30'; Mățan (yellow card) 44'; Ramirez 51'; Cucho 71'; Yeboah (yellow card) 77'; Jackson 85'	Report	Enrique 74'; Muriel 78' (pen.), 90+7'; Smith (yellow card) 82'; Angulo (yellow card) 89'	Stadium: Lower.com Field; Attendance: 20,868; Referee: Sergii Boiko

September 28 31	FC Dallas	1–3	Orlando City SC	Frisco, Texas
8:30 pm	Arriola 78' (pen.); Farrington (yellow card) 90+2'	Report	Enrique 18'; Schlegel 51'; Torres 55'; Araújo (yellow card) 67'; Gallese (yellow card) 86'; McGuire (yellow card) 90+4'	Stadium: Toyota Stadium; Attendance: 19,096; Referee: Jair Marrufo

October 2 32	Orlando City SC	2–1	Philadelphia Union	Orlando, Florida
7:00 pm	Schlegel (yellow card) 19'; Torres 57', (yellow card) 69'; McGuire 64', (yellow card) 90+5'; Araújo (yellow card) 90+2'	Report	Gazdag (yellow card) 67'; Sullivan 72'; Wagner (yellow card) 74'; Uhre (yellow card) 90+1'	Stadium: Inter&Co Stadium; Attendance: 23,027; Referee: Armando Villarreal

October 5 33	FC Cincinnati	1–3	Orlando City SC	Cincinnati, Ohio
7:30 pm	Kelsy (yellow card) 35'; Acosta 45'	Report	Enrique 10', 72'; Cartagena (yellow card) 17'; Angulo 66'; Jansson (yellow card) 90+6'	Stadium: TQL Stadium; Attendance: 24,468; Referee: Filip Dujic

October 19 34	Orlando City SC	1–2	Atlanta United FC	Orlando, Florida
7:00 pm	Ojeda 42', (yellow card) 61'	Report	Lobzhanidze 7'; Thiaré 16'	Stadium: Inter&Co Stadium; Attendance: 25,046; Referee: Rubiel Vazquez

==== Standings ====
Eastern Conference table

MLS Eastern Conference table (2024)
Pos	Team	Pld	W	L	T	GF	GA	GD	Pts	Qualification
2	Columbus Crew	34	19	6	9	72	40	+32	66	Qualification for round one and the 2025 Leagues Cup
3	FC Cincinnati	34	18	11	5	58	48	+10	59	Qualification for round one and the 2025 Leagues Cup
4	Orlando City SC	34	15	12	7	59	50	+9	52	Qualification for round one and the 2025 Leagues Cup
5	Charlotte FC	34	14	11	9	46	37	+9	51	Qualification for round one and the 2025 Leagues Cup
6	New York City FC	34	14	12	8	54	49	+5	50	Qualification for round one and the 2025 Leagues Cup

Source: MLS
Rules for classification: 1) points; 2) total wins; 3) total goal differential; 4) total goals scored; 5) fewer disciplinary points; 6) away goal differential; 7) away goals scored; 8) home goals differential; 9) home goals scored; 10) coin toss (2 clubs tied) or drawing of lots (≥3 clubs tied)

Overall table

Overall MLS standings table
Pos	Team	Pld	W	L	T	GF	GA	GD	Pts	Qualification
7	Seattle Sounders FC	34	16	9	9	51	35	+16	57	Qualification for the CONCACAF Champions Cup Round One (Note: As third highest-ranked club in 2024 MLS Supporters' Shield not already qualified)
8	Houston Dynamo FC	34	15	10	9	47	39	+8	54	Qualification for the U.S. Open Cup Round of 32 (Note: As one of the best U.S. teams in the overall table to not qualify for the 2025 CONCACAF Champions Cup)
9	Orlando City SC	34	15	12	7	59	50	+9	52	Qualification for the U.S. Open Cup Round of 32
10	Minnesota United FC	34	15	12	7	58	49	+9	52	Qualification for the U.S. Open Cup Round of 32
11	Charlotte FC	34	14	11	9	46	37	+9	51	Qualification for the U.S. Open Cup Round of 32

Source: MLS
Rules for classification: 1) points; 2) total wins; 3) total goal differential; 4) total goals scored; 5) fewer disciplinary points; 6) away goal differential; 7) away goals scored; 8) home goals differential; 9) home goals scored; 10) coin toss (2 clubs tied) or drawing of lots (≥3 clubs tied)

=== MLS Cup playoffs ===
October 28 Round One game 1	#4 Orlando City SC	2–0	#5 Charlotte FC	Orlando, Florida
7:30 pm	Torres 32'; Ojeda 76'	Report		Stadium: Inter&Co Stadium; Attendance: 17,787; Referee: Drew Fischer

November 1 Round One game 2	#5 Charlotte FC	0–0 (3–1 p)	#4 Orlando City SC	Charlotte, North Carolina
7:30 pm		Report		Stadium: Bank of America Stadium; Attendance: 40,238; Referee: Guido Gonzales Jr.
	Penalties
	Agyemang (penalty scored); Świderski (penalty scored); Westwood (penalty scored)		(penalty missed) Lodeiro; (penalty missed) Jansson; (penalty scored) Muriel; (penalty missed) McGuire

November 9 Round One game 3	#4 Orlando City SC	1–1 (4–1 p)	#5 Charlotte FC	Orlando, Florida
6:00 pm	Torres 90+12'	Report	Świderski 81'	Stadium: Inter&Co Stadium; Attendance: 20,021; Referee: Ismir Pekmic
	Penalties
	Muriel (penalty scored); Smith (penalty scored); Torres (penalty scored); Rafael Santos (penalty scored)		(penalty missed) Biel; (penalty missed) Świderski; (penalty scored) Westwood
Note: Orlando City won the series 2–1.

November 24 Conference semi-finals	#4 Orlando City SC	1–0	#9 Atlanta United FC	Orlando, Florida
3:30 pm	Enrique 39'	Report	Williams (yellow card) 59'	Stadium: Inter&Co Stadium; Attendance: 25,055; Referee: Armando Villarreal

November 30 Conference final	#4 Orlando City SC	0–1	#7 New York Red Bulls	Orlando, Florida
7:30 pm	Araújo (yellow card) 27'; Schlegel (yellow card) 90+2'; Enrique (yellow card) 90+6'; Jansson (yellow card) 90+6'	Report	Reyes (yellow card) 24', (goal) 47'; S. Nealis (yellow card) 67'	Stadium: Inter&Co Stadium; Attendance: 25,046; Referee: Rosendo Mendoza

=== U.S. Open Cup ===
MLS announced the league's intention to remove all its teams from the U.S. Open Cup in 2024. The USSF rejected a request for them to be replaced by their MLS Next Pro reserve teams. On March 1, MLS confirmed an agreement with USSF had been reached for 8 MLS teams and a further 11 MLS Next Pro teams to participate in the 2024 edition. Orlando City was not one of these teams, and neither was MLS Next Pro affiliate Orlando City B, due to their participation in the 2024 CONCACAF Champions Cup.

=== CONCACAF Champions Cup ===
Orlando qualified for the CONCACAF Champions Cup as one of the two best clubs in the 2023 Supporters' Shield standings not already qualified for the competition, entering in round one.

February 21 Round one first leg	Cavalry FC (Canada)	0–3	Orlando City SC	Langford, British Columbia, Canada
7:00 pm (PT)	Trafford (yellow card) 55'; Montgomery (yellow card) 60'	Report	McGuire 21'; Torres 38', 75'	Stadium: Starlight Stadium; Attendance: 2,484; Referee: Juan Gabriel Calderón (Costa Rica)
Note: Due to expected winter weather issues in Calgary, Cavalry FC opted to schedule the first round match in Langford, British Columbia instead of at ATCO Field.

February 27 Round one second leg	Orlando City SC	3–1 (6–1 agg.)	(Canada) Cavalry FC	Orlando, Florida
6:00 pm	Lodeiro 48'; Enrique 71'; Smith 88'	Report	Klomp (yellow card) 56'; Bevan 64'	Stadium: Inter&Co Stadium; Attendance: 5,141; Referee: Fernando Guerrero (Mexico)

March 5 Round of 16 first leg	Orlando City SC	0–0	(Mexico) Tigres UANL	Orlando, Florida
9:00 pm	Cartagena (yellow card) 26'; Thórhallsson (yellow card) 71'; Araújo (yellow card) 88'	Report	Lainez (yellow card) 35'	Stadium: Inter&Co Stadium; Attendance: 10,098; Referee: Walter López Castellanos (Guatemala)

March 12 Round of 16 second leg	Tigres UANL (Mexico)	4–2 (4–2 agg.)	Orlando City SC	Monterrey, Mexico
9:30 pm (CT)	Flores 13'; Gignac 20' (pen.), (yellow card) 23'; Gallese 68' (o.g.); Carioca (red card) 72'; Córdova 81'; Ibáñez (yellow card) 89'	Report	Jansson (yellow card) 18'; Torres 24' (pen.); Smith (yellow card) 30'; Lodeiro (yellow card) 31'; Cartagena (yellow card) 49'; Ojeda 90+1' (pen.)	Stadium: Estadio Universitario; Attendance: 34,686; Referee: Iván Barton (El Salvador)

=== Leagues Cup ===
==== Group stage ====
July 26 Group stage	Orlando City SC (United States)	4–1	(Canada) CF Montréal	Orlando, Florida
8:00 pm	Thórhallsson 7'; Torres 36'; Enrique 45+2'; Ojeda 57'	Report	Cóccaro (yellow card) 56'; Martínez 68'	Stadium: Inter&Co Stadium; Attendance: 16,033; Referee: Adonai Escobedo (Mexico)

August 4 Group stage	Orlando City SC (United States)	1–1 (5–4 p)	(Mexico) Atlético San Luis	Orlando, Florida
8:30 pm	Smith (red card) 29'; Jansson (yellow card) 30'; Enrique 45+6'; Araújo (yellow card) 76'	Report	Chávez (yellow card) 37'; Dourado 71'	Stadium: Inter&Co Stadium; Attendance: 15,662; Referee: Mario Escobar (Guatemala)
	Penalties
	Lodeiro (penalty scored); McGuire (penalty scored); Cartagena (penalty scored); Santos (penalty scored); Thórhallsson (penalty scored)		(penalty scored) Vitinho; (penalty scored) Salles-Lamonge; (penalty scored) Piccini; (penalty missed) Bonatini; (penalty scored) Boli

Pos	Team	Pld	W	PW	PL	L	GF	GA	GD	Pts	Qualification	ORL	MTL	ASL
1	(United States Soccer Federation) Orlando City SC	2	1	1	0	0	5	2	+3	5	Advance to knockout stage	—	4–1	1–1
2	(Canadian Soccer Association) CF Montréal	2	1	0	0	1	4	6	−2	3	Advance to knockout stage	—	—	—
3	(Mexican Football Federation) Atlético San Luis	2	0	0	1	1	3	4	−1	1		—	2–3	—

Source: Leagues Cup
Rules for classification: Tiebreakers

==== Knockout stage ====
August 9 Round of 32	Orlando City SC (United States)	0–0 (4–5 p)	(Mexico) Cruz Azul	Orlando, Florida
19:30 pm	Brekalo (yellow card) 46'	Report	Piovi (yellow card) 85'	Stadium: Inter&Co Stadium; Attendance: 17,057; Referee: Fernando Guerrero (Mexico)
	Penalties
	Jansson (penalty missed); Lodeiro (penalty scored); Muriel (penalty scored); McGuire (penalty scored); Torres (penalty scored); Thórhallsson (penalty missed)		(penalty missed) Rivero; (penalty scored) Montaño; (penalty scored) Ditta; (penalty scored) Piovi; (penalty scored) Sepúlveda; (penalty scored) Antuna

== Squad statistics ==
=== Appearances ===
As of match played November 30, 2024

Starting appearances are listed first, followed by substitute appearances after the + symbol where applicable.

No.	Pos	Nat	Player	Total		MLS		Playoffs		Leagues Cup		Continental	
No.	Pos	Nat	Player	Apps	Goals	Apps	Goals	Apps	Goals	Apps	Goals	Apps	Goals
Goalkeepers
1	GK	(Peru) PER	Pedro Gallese	40	0	29	0	5	0	3	0	3	0
31	GK	(United States) USA	Mason Stajduhar	6	0	5	0	0	0	0	0	1	0
50	GK	(Venezuela) VEN	Javier Otero	1	0	0+1	0	0	0	0	0	0	0
99	GK	(United States) USA	Carlos Mercado	0	0	0	0	0	0	0	0	0	0
Defenders
3	DF	(Brazil) BRA	Rafael Santos	43	1	23+9	1	5	0	1+2	0	1+2	0
4	DF	(Slovenia) SLO	David Brekalo	28	1	12+7	1	0+4	0	3	0	2	0
6	DF	(Sweden) SWE	Robin Jansson	41	1	30	1	5	0	3	0	3	0
15	DF	(Argentina) ARG	Rodrigo Schlegel	36	1	26+2	1	5	0	0+1	0	2	0
17	DF	(Iceland) ISL	Dagur Dan Thórhallsson	42	3	29+2	2	5	0	3	1	3	0
20	DF	(Canada) CAN	Luca Petrasso	3	0	0+2	0	0	0	0+1	0	0	0
24	DF	(United States) USA	Kyle Smith	40	1	12+17	0	0+5	0	2	0	4	1
26	DF	(United States) USA	Michael Halliday	7	0	0+6	0	0	0	0	0	1	0
29	DF	(United States) USA	Tahir Reid-Brown	0	0	0	0	0	0	0	0	0	0
30	DF	(United States) USA	Alex Freeman	3	0	0+2	0	0	0	0+1	0	0	0
68	DF	(United States) USA	Thomas Williams	0	0	0	0	0	0	0	0	0	0
Midfielders
5	MF	(Uruguay) URU	César Araújo	41	1	28+2	1	5	0	3	0	2+1	0
8	MF	(Brazil) BRA	Felipe Martins	16	0	4+9	0	0	0	0	0	2+1	0
14	MF	(Uruguay) URU	Nicolás Lodeiro	46	2	16+18	1	0+5	0	1+2	0	2+2	1
16	MF	(Peru) PER	Wilder Cartagena	39	0	25+2	0	5	0	3	0	4	0
18	MF	(Norway) NOR	Heine Gikling Bruseth	0	0	0	0	0	0	0	0	0	0
33	MF	(United States) USA	Jeorgio Kocevski	12	0	1+10	0	0	0	0+1	0	0	0
56	MF	(United States) USA	Colin Guske	0	0	0	0	0	0	0	0	0	0
95	MF	(Chile) CHI	Favian Loyola	0	0	0	0	0	0	0	0	0	0
Forwards
7	FW	(Argentina) ARG	Ramiro Enrique	32	12	12+8	8	5	1	3	2	1+3	1
9	FW	(Colombia) COL	Luis Muriel	43	5	14+19	5	0+5	0	0+2	0	3	0
10	FW	(Uruguay) URU	Facundo Torres	44	20	30+2	14	5	2	3	1	3+1	3
11	FW	(Argentina) ARG	Martín Ojeda	46	7	24+10	4	5	1	3	1	2+2	1
13	FW	(United States) USA	Duncan McGuire	37	11	18+9	10	0+5	0	0+2	0	1+2	1
23	FW	(Ghana) GHA	Shak Mohammed	3	0	0+2	0	0	0	0	0	1	0
27	FW	(United States) USA	Jack Lynn	15	2	2+9	2	0+1	0	0+1	0	0+2	0
34	FW	(Japan) JPN	Yutaro Tsukada	4	0	0+3	0	0	0	0+1	0	0	0
77	FW	(Colombia) COL	Iván Angulo	44	5	34	5	5	0	2	0	3	0
Players away from the club on loan:
22	FW	(Argentina) ARG	Gastón González	0	0	0	0	0	0	0	0	0	0
28	DF	(Somalia) SOM	Abdi Salim	1	0	0	0	0	0	0	0	0+1	0

=== Goalscorers ===
As of match played November 30, 2024

Rank	No.	Pos.	Name	MLS	Playoffs	Leagues Cup	Continental	Total
1	17	FW	(Uruguay) Facundo Torres	14	2	1	3	20
2	7	FW	(Argentina) Ramiro Enrique	8	1	2	1	12
3	13	FW	(United States) Duncan McGuire	10	0	0	1	11
4	11	FW	(Argentina) Martín Ojeda	4	1	1	1	7
5	9	FW	(Colombia) Luis Muriel	5	0	0	0	5
5	77	FW	(Colombia) Iván Angulo	5	0	0	0	5
7	17	DF	(Iceland) Dagur Dan Thórhallsson	2	0	1	0	3
8	14	MF	(Uruguay) Nicolás Lodeiro	1	0	0	1	2
8	27	FW	(United States) Jack Lynn	2	0	0	0	2
10	3	DF	(Brazil) Rafael Santos	1	0	0	0	1
10	4	DF	(Slovenia) David Brekalo	1	0	0	0	1
10	5	MF	(Uruguay) César Araújo	1	0	0	0	1
10	6	DF	(Sweden) Robin Jansson	1	0	0	0	1
10	15	DF	(Argentina) Rodrigo Schlegel	1	0	0	0	1
10	24	DF	(United States) Kyle Smith	0	0	0	1	1
Own goal				3	0	0	0	3
Total				59	4	5	8	76

=== Shutouts ===
As of match played November 30, 2024

Rank	No.	Pos.	Name	MLS	Playoffs	Leagues Cup	Continental	Total
1	1	GK	(Peru) Pedro Gallese	8	3	1	2	14
2	31	GK	(United States) Mason Stajduhar	1	0	0	0	1
Total				9	3	1	2	15

=== Disciplinary record ===
As of match played November 30, 2024

No.	Pos.	Name	MLS			Playoffs			Leagues Cup			Continental			Total		
No.	Pos.	Name	Booked	(yellow card) (yellow-red card)	Sent off (straight red)	Booked	(yellow card) (yellow-red card)	Sent off (straight red)	Booked	(yellow card) (yellow-red card)	Sent off (straight red)	Booked	(yellow card) (yellow-red card)	Sent off (straight red)	Booked	(yellow card) (yellow-red card)	Sent off (straight red)
1	GK	(Peru) Pedro Gallese	2	0	0	0	0	0	0	0	0	0	0	0	2	0	0
3	DF	(Brazil) Rafael Santos	2	0	0	0	0	0	0	0	0	0	0	0	2	0	0
4	DF	(Slovenia) David Brekalo	1	0	0	0	0	0	1	0	0	0	0	0	2	0	0
5	MF	(Uruguay) César Araújo	12	0	0	1	0	0	1	0	0	1	0	0	15	0	0
6	DF	(Sweden) Robin Jansson	8	0	0	2	0	0	1	0	0	1	0	0	12	0	0
7	FW	(Argentina) Ramiro Enrique	4	0	0	2	0	0	0	0	0	0	0	0	6	0	0
8	MF	(Brazil) Felipe Martins	3	0	0	0	0	0	0	0	0	0	0	0	3	0	0
9	FW	(Colombia) Luis Muriel	2	0	0	0	0	0	0	0	0	0	0	0	2	0	0
10	FW	(Uruguay) Facundo Torres	3	0	0	0	0	0	0	0	0	0	0	0	3	0	0
11	FW	(Argentina) Martín Ojeda	2	0	0	0	0	0	0	0	0	0	0	0	2	0	0
13	FW	(United States) Duncan McGuire	6	0	0	0	0	0	0	0	0	0	0	0	6	0	0
14	MF	(Uruguay) Nicolás Lodeiro	1	0	0	0	0	0	0	0	0	1	0	0	2	0	0
15	DF	(Argentina) Rodrigo Schlegel	4	0	1	2	0	0	0	0	0	0	0	0	6	0	1
16	MF	(Peru) Wilder Cartagena	7	0	1	2	0	0	0	0	0	2	0	0	11	0	1
17	DF	(Iceland) Dagur Dan Thórhallsson	3	0	0	0	0	0	0	0	0	1	0	0	4	0	0
24	DF	(United States) Kyle Smith	2	0	0	0	0	0	0	0	1	1	0	0	3	0	1
26	DF	(United States) Michael Halliday	1	0	0	0	0	0	0	0	0	0	0	0	1	0	0
77	FW	(Colombia) Iván Angulo	4	0	0	0	0	0	0	0	0	0	0	0	4	0	0
Total			67	0	2	9	0	0	3	0	1	7	0	0	86	0	3

== Player movement ==
Per Major League Soccer and club policies, terms of the deals do not get disclosed.

=== MLS SuperDraft picks ===
Draft picks are not automatically signed to the team roster. The 2024 MLS SuperDraft was held on December 19, 2023. Orlando made four selections.

2024 Orlando City MLS SuperDraft Picks
Round	Selection	Player	Position	College	Status
1	21	(United States) Jeorgio Kocevski	MF	(New York (state)) Syracuse University	Signed
1	25	(Japan) Yutaro Tsukada	FW	West Virginia University	Signed to OCB
2	54	(United States) Filip Mirkovic	MF	(Pennsylvania) University of Pittsburgh	Not signed
3	83	(Japan) Riyon Tori	MF	University of North Carolina at Charlotte	Returned to college

=== Transfers in ===
No.	Name	Pos.	Transferred from	Fee/notes	Date	Ref.
16	(Peru) Wilder Cartagena	DM	(United Arab Emirates) Al-Ittihad Kalba	Exercised option to buy.	December 14, 2023	
77	(Colombia) Iván Angulo	LW	(Brazil) Palmeiras	Undisclosed fee, reportedly $1.5m	January 3, 2024	
14	(Uruguay) Nicolás Lodeiro	AM	(United States) Seattle Sounders FC	Free agent signing.	January 4, 2024	
29	(United States) Tahir Reid-Brown	LB	(United States) Orlando City B	Signed Homegrown contract.	January 23, 2024	
4	(Slovenia) David Brekalo	CB	(Norway) Viking FK	Undisclosed fee, reportedly $2.5m	February 8, 2024	
9	(Colombia) Luis Muriel	CF	(Italy) Atalanta	Undisclosed fee, reportedly $1.0m	February 15, 2024	
34	(Japan) Yutaro Tsukada	LW	(United States) Orlando City B	Signed short-term contract.	May 11, 2024	
99	(United States) Carlos Mercado	GK	(United States) Orlando City B	Signed short-term contract.	July 3, 2024	
56	(United States) Colin Guske	CM	(United States) Orlando City B	Signed short-term contract.	August 4, 2024	
34	(Japan) Yutaro Tsukada	LW	(United States) Orlando City B	Signed first-team contract.	August 15, 2024	
18	(Norway) Heine Gikling Bruseth	MF	(Norway) Kristiansund BK	Undisclosed fee, reportedly $1.0m	August 20, 2024	
99	(United States) Carlos Mercado	GK	(United States) Orlando City B	Signed first-team contract.	September 20, 2024	

=== Transfers out ===
No.	Name	Pos.	Transferred to	Fee/notes	Date	Ref.
10	(Uruguay) Mauricio Pereyra	AM	(Uruguay) Nacional	Mutually terminated contract; signed with Nacional on 12/12/23	December 6, 2023	
21	(Brazil) Júnior Urso	CM	(United States) Charlotte FC	Option declined; signed with Charlotte FC on 2/21/24	December 11, 2023	
32	(Puerto Rico) Wilfredo Rivera	LW	(United States) Orlando City B	Option declined; signed with Orlando City B on 3/15/24	December 11, 2023	
99	(United States) Adam Grinwis	GK	(United States) Charleston Battery	Contract expired; signed with Charleston Battery on 1/18/24	December 11, 2023	
22	(Brazil) Antônio Carlos	CB	(Brazil) Fluminense	Undisclosed fee, reportedly $500k	December 16, 2023	

=== Loans out ===
No.	Name	Pos.	Loaned to	Notes	Date	Ref.
20	(Canada) Luca Petrasso	LB	(Italy) Triestina	Six-month loan with option to buy	January 12, 2024	
22	(Argentina) Gastón González	LW	(Uruguay) Nacional	12-month loan with option to buy	January 27, 2024	
13	(United States) Duncan McGuire	CF	(England) ~~Blackburn Rovers~~	Six-month loan with option to buy. Voided by EFL following appeal on 2/8/24.	February 1, 2024	
28	(Somalia) Abdi Salim	CB	(United States) Detroit City FC	Six-month loan	June 24, 2024	
