= Jeorgio Kocevski =

American soccer player (born 2002)

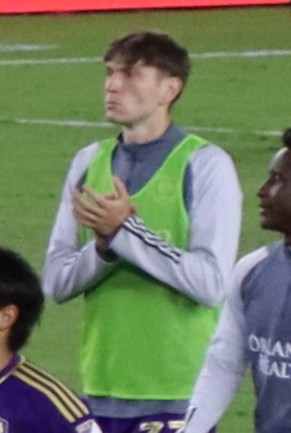
- Kocevski with Orlando City in 2024

Personal information
- Date of birth: August 19, 2002 (age 24)
- Place of birth: Liverpool, New York, U.S.
- Height: 6 ft 1 in (1.85 m)
- Positions: Central midfielder; defensive midfielder

Team information
- Current team: FC Tulsa
- Number: 13

Youth career
- 2016–2019: Empire United SA

College career
Years	Team	Apps	(Gls)
2020–2023	Syracuse Orange	71	(7)

Senior career*
Years	Team	Apps	(Gls)
2019–2021	Syracuse FC		
2022	Ocean City Nor'easters	4	(0)
2023	Long Island Rough Riders	11	(4)
2024	Orlando City	11	(0)
2024	→ Orlando City B (loan)	4	(0)
2025	Ventura County FC	23	(7)
2026–	FC Tulsa	29	(2)
- * Club domestic league appearances and goals as of 23:55, October 28, 2026 (UTC)

Jeorgio Kocevski (born August 19, 2002) is an American professional soccer player who plays as a central or defensive midfielder for USL Championship club FC Tulsa.

== Early life ==
Kocevski grew up in Liverpool, New York, and is of Macedonian descent. Kocevski played youth soccer in nearby Rochester with the U.S. Soccer Development Academy team Empire United Soccer Academy.

== College career ==
In 2020, Kocevski began attending Syracuse University, where he played four seasons for the men's soccer team. He made his collegiate debut in the season opener on October 6, 2020, recording his first collegiate assist. On February 12, 2021, he scored his first and only goal of the season as an 86th-minute winner in a 2–1 victory over the Hofstra Pride. In total he played 12 matches as a freshman including 10 starts. He made a further 17 appearances as a sophomore, creating one assist. Kocevski had a breakout season as a junior in 2022 as Syracuse won the treble of the 2022 Atlantic Coast Conference regular season, 2022 ACC tournament and 2022 NCAA College Cup, marking the program's first national championship title in history. He was a prominent figure starting in 21 of his 22 appearances, including starting every ACC and NCAA tournament match, and earned All-Tournament team honors for both. He scored a career-high five goals and registered four assists on the year.

Ahead of his senior season, he was named team captain. He started all 20 appearances and made a career-high 12 assists, the third most in a single season in program history, as well as scoring one goal. At the end of the season, he was named the ACC Co-Midfielder of the Year jointly with Mouhameth Thiam, and was named to the All-ACC First Team, the All-South Region First Team, and was a Third Team All-American. He was also invited to participate in the MLS College Showcase.

== Club career ==
=== Amateur and semi-professional play ===
In 2019 and 2021, he played with Syracuse FC in the National Premier Soccer League. In 2021, he was named to the Rust Belt Conference Best XI.

In 2022, he played with the Ocean City Nor'easters in USL League Two.

In 2023, he joined USL League Two club Long Island Rough Riders. In his debut on May 27, he scored his first goal in a 3–0 victory over the Hudson Valley Hammers. He scored four goals in 12 matches for the club. He helped them win the Metropolitan Division Championship and was named the club's Player of the Year and was named to the USL League Two Team of the Year.

=== Orlando City ===
In December 2023, Kocevski was selected in the first round (21st overall) of the 2024 MLS SuperDraft by Orlando City. Orlando traded $75,000 in General Allocation Money during the draft to acquire the pick from Colorado Rapids. In February 2024, Orlando signed him to a one-year contract with three option years. On March 17, Kocevski made his debut for the club when he came on as an 81st-minute substitute for Luis Muriel in a 2–0 loss to Atlanta United. On December 5, it was announced that Orlando City had let Kocevski's contract expire at the end of the season and were not interested in pursuing an extension.

=== Ventura County ===
On February 12, 2025, Kocevski made an appearance with Major League Soccer club LA Galaxy during the Coachella Valley Invitational where he assisted Tucker Lepley's opening goal as the Galaxy defeated Minnesota United 2–1. The following month on March 6, 2025, Kocevski was named to the roster of LA Galaxy's reserve affiliate, Ventura County. A day later, Kocevski made his debut for the club when he started in a 3–2 win over Tacoma Defiance, playing the full match. On May 9, Kocevski scored his first goal for the team when he scored the opening goal of a 2–1 victory against Los Angeles FC 2. On August 1, Kocevski scored his first career hat-trick, one of which was a penalty, as Ventura County won 6–4 at Tacoma Defiance. For his performance, Kocevski was named Player of the Matchweek three days later. Kocevski finished the season as the joint-highest goal scorer on the team alongside Luis Müller with seven goals and one assist.

=== FC Tulsa ===
On February 5, 2026, USL Championship side FC Tulsa announced they had signed Kocevski to a contract for the 2026 season. On May 3, Kocevski scored his first goal for FC Tulsa in a 2–1 comeback win at Monterey Bay FC through an assist from Bailey Sparks.

== Career statistics ==
=== College ===
Team	Season	ACC regular season			ACC Tournament		NCAA Tournament		Total	
Team	Season	Division	Apps	Goals	Apps	Goals	Apps	Goals	Apps	Goals
Syracuse Orange	2020–21	Div. I	12	1	—		—		12	1
Syracuse Orange	2021	Div. I	16	0	1	0	—		17	0
Syracuse Orange	2022	Div. I	14	4	3	1	5	0	20	5
Syracuse Orange	2023	Div. I	16	1	3	0	1	0	20	1
Career total			58	6	7	1	6	0	71	7

=== Club ===
As of November 1, 2026

Club	Season	League			Playoffs		National cup (Note: Includes U.S. Open Cup)		Continental		Other		Total	
Club	Season	Division	Apps	Goals	Apps	Goals	Apps	Goals	Apps	Goals	Apps	Goals	Apps	Goals
Ocean City Nor'easters	2022	USL League Two	4	0	1	0	—		—		—		5	0
Long Island Rough Riders	2023	USL League Two	11	4	1	0	—		—		—		12	4
Orlando City	2024	Major League Soccer	11	0	—		—		0	0	1 (Note: Appearances in Leagues Cup)	0	12	0
Orlando City B (loan)	2024	MLS Next Pro	4	0	—		—		—		—		4	0
Ventura County FC	2025	MLS Next Pro	23	7	—		2	0	—		—		25	7
FC Tulsa	2026	USL Championship	29	2	1	0	2	0	—		4 (Note: Appearances in USL Cup)	0	36	2
Career total			82	13	3	0	4	0	0	0	5	0	94	13

== Honors ==
Syracuse Orange

- Atlantic Coast Conference regular season: 2022
- Atlantic Coast Conference tournament: 2022
- NCAA College Cup: 2022

Ocean City Nor'easters

- USL League Two Mid Atlantic Division: 2022

Long Island Rough Riders

- USL League Two Metropolitan Division: 2023

Individual

- National Premier Soccer League Rust Belt Conference XI: 2021
- ACC Midfielder of the Year: 2023
- All-ACC First Team: 2023
- USL League Two Team of the Year: 2023
