= 2026 FC Tulsa season =

FC Tulsa
2026 season
- Head coach: Luke Spencer
- Stadium: ONEOK Field; Tulsa, Oklahoma
- USL Championship: Conference: 7th Overall: 13th
- USL Playoffs: Conference; Quarter-finals
- U.S. Open Cup: Round of 32
- USL Cup: Group Stage
- Black Gold Derby: Not Held
- Highest home attendance: 5,717 (March 14, against San Antonio FC)
- Lowest home attendance: 3,200 (April 25, against One Knoxville SC)
- Average home league attendance: 4,348
- Biggest win: 5–1 (August 22, against Orange County SC)
- Biggest defeat: 1–5 (June 13 , against Charleston Battery)
Home colors	Away colors

The 2026 FC Tulsa season was the franchise's 12th season in the USL Championship, the second-tier professional soccer league in the United States. The team also participated in the 2026 U.S. Open Cup and the 2026 USL Cup.

FC Tulsa came coming off of its best season in club history, winning the Western Conference final and making it to the 2025 USL Championship playoffs Final, where they lost to Eastern Conference champions Pittsburgh Riverhounds SC.

== Club ==
As of August 5, 2026

Note: Flags indicate national team as defined under FIFA eligibility rules; some limited exceptions apply. Players may hold more than one non-FIFA nationality.

No.	Pos.	Nation	Player
1	GK	GRE	Alexandros Tabakis
2	DF	USA	Owen Damm
4	DF	HAI	Delentz Pierre
5	MF	BRA	Marcos Serrato
6	MF	USA	Boubacar Diallo
7	FW	FRA	Rémi Cabral
8	MF	RSA	Jamie Webber
9	MF	GUA	Arquímides Ordóñez
10	FW	USA	Kalil ElMedkhar
12	DF	USA	Lucas Stauffer
13	MF	USA	Jeorgio Kocevski
14	FW	USA	Logan Dorsey (on loan from Minnesota United 2)
15	DF	USA	Lamar Batista
17	MF	USA	Bailey Sparks
19	FW	HAI	Nelson Pierre (on loan from Vancouver Whitecaps)

No.	Pos.	Nation	Player
20	MF	AUS	Giordano Colli
22	MF	SRB	Stefan Lukic
23	DF	USA	Wilson Eisner (on loan from San Diego FC)
25	DF	USA	Alonzo Clarke
27	MF	USA	Zion Siranga
28	GK	USA	Dane Jacomen
31	DF	USA	Grant Robinson
44	DF	USA	Joel Sangwa
47	DF	SCO	Harvey St Clair
66	DF	KEN	Will Wilson
91	DF	FRA	Abdoulaye Cissoko
98	DF	BRA	Ian
99	GK	USA	Noah Adams
—	FW	USA	Dylan Borczak (on loan from Union Omaha)

=== Out on loan ===
Note: Flags indicate national team as defined under FIFA eligibility rules; some limited exceptions apply. Players may hold more than one non-FIFA nationality.

No.	Pos.	Nation	Player
99	GK	USA	Johan Peñaranda (on loan to Lexington SC)

=== Staff ===
As of January 9, 2025

- (United States) Caleb Patterson-Sewell – sporting director / general manager
- (United States) Mario Sanchez – technical director
- (United States) Luke Spencer – head coach
- (Brazil) Gabriel Zapponi - assistant coach
- (England) Alexis Vizarelis - goalkeeping coach
- (Brazil) Leandro Spinola – sports science director
- (United States) Destiny Lalaguna – head athletic trainer

=== USL Championship ===
On December 16, 2025, the USL Championship released the schedule for all 25 teams for both the regular season and the USL Cup.

==== Standings — Western Conference ====
Pos	Team	Pld	W	L	T	GF	GA	GD	Pts	Qualification
1	New Mexico United	30	15	8	7	45	34	+11	52	Playoffs
2	Sacramento Republic FC	30	13	5	12	42	28	+14	51	Playoffs
3	El Paso Locomotive FC	30	15	10	5	48	38	+10	50	Playoffs
4	Lexington SC	30	14	10	6	57	39	+18	48	Playoffs
5	Colorado Springs Switchbacks FC	30	13	9	8	44	38	+6	47	Playoffs
6	San Antonio FC	30	11	7	12	32	30	+2	45	Playoffs
7	FC Tulsa	30	11	9	10	34	31	+3	43	Playoffs
8	Phoenix Rising FC	30	11	10	9	45	46	−1	42	Playoffs
9	Orange County SC	30	10	11	9	39	49	−10	39	
10	Oakland Roots SC	30	9	10	11	39	40	−1	38	
11	Las Vegas Lights FC	30	10	14	6	41	48	−7	36	
12	Monterey Bay FC	30	6	18	6	32	52	−20	24	

Updated to match(es) played on October 24, 2026. Source: USL Championship Standings
Rules for classification: 1) total wins against conference opponents; 2) goal differential against conference opponents; 3) goals scored against conference opponents; 4) head-to-head points against conference opponents; 5) points per game against conference opponents; 6) points per game against non-conference opponents; 7) fewest disciplinary points; 8) coin toss or drawing of lots

==== Match results ====
All times are in Central Time.

March 7 1	Sacramento Republic FC	2—0	FC Tulsa	Sacramento, California
9:00 PM	Kleemann 68'; Edwards 83'	Report		Stadium: Heart Health Park; Attendance: 11,569; Referee: Greg Dopka

March 14 2	FC Tulsa	0—0	San Antonio FC	Tulsa, Oklahoma
7:00 PM		Report		Stadium: ONEOK Field; Attendance: 5,717; Referee: Abdou Ndiaye

March 21 3	FC Tulsa	3—2	Las Vegas Lights FC	Tulsa, Oklahoma
7:00 PM	ElMedkhar 41' * Cabral 61' * Damm 82'	Report	Rodriguez 32' * Okyere 66'	Stadium: ONEOK Field; Attendance: 4,012; Referee: Corbyn May

March 28 4	FC Tulsa	1—1	Phoenix Rising FC	Tulsa, Oklahoma
7:00 PM	Sparks 50'	Report	Carvajal 74'	Stadium: ONEOK Field; Attendance: 4,098; Referee: Calin Radosav

April 11 5	FC Tulsa	0–1	Orange County SC	Tulsa, Oklahoma
7:00 PM		Report	MacKinnon 55'	Stadium: ONEOK Field; Attendance: 4,004; Referee: Alyssa Pennington

April 18 6	Oakland Roots SC	1–1	FC Tulsa	Oakland, California
9:00 PM	Prentice 4'; Hackshaw (red card)	Report		Stadium: Oakland Coliseum; Attendance: 3,726; Referee: Ramy Touchan

April 29 7	El Paso Locomotive FC	1–4	FC Tulsa	El Paso, Texas
8:00 PM	Torres (red card) 11'; Méndez 57' (pen.)	Report	Cabral 45+2', 58'; Pierre 73'; ElMedkhar 84'	Stadium: Southwest University Park; Attendance: 3,704; Referee: Ekaterina Koroleva

May 3 8	Monterey Bay FC	1–2	FC Tulsa	Seaside, California
6:00 PM	Gindiri 25'	Report	Webber 49' (pen.); Kocevski 57'	Stadium: Cardinale Stadium; Attendance: 3,603; Referee: Trevor Wiseman

May 22 9	FC Tulsa	2–0	Hartford Athletic	Tulsa, Oklahoma
7:30 PM	Webber 45+1' (pen.); Clarke 61'	Report	Careaga (red card) 90+7'	Stadium: ONEOK Field; Attendance: 4,212; Referee: Brandon Stevis

May 30 10	Las Vegas Lights FC	0–0	FC Tulsa	Las Vegas, Nevada
9:30 PM		Report		Stadium: Cashman Field; Attendance: 2,939; Referee: Elvis Osmanovic

June 13 11	Charleston Battery	5–1	FC Tulsa	Mt. Pleasant, South Carolina
6:30 PM	Swan 16'; Foster 18'; Ycaza 45+1'; Cabrera 80'; Allan 90+3'	Report	Cabral 15'	Stadium: Patriots Point Soccer Complex; Attendance: 3,179; Referee: Alyssa Pennington

June 17 12	FC Tulsa	2–0	Monterey Bay FC	Tulsa, Oklahoma
6:30 PM	Dorsey 26'; Batista 51'	Report		Stadium: ONEOK Field; Attendance: 3,558; Referee: Rodrigo Albuquerque

June 20 13	FC Tulsa	1–2	Colorado Springs Switchbacks FC	Tulsa, Oklahoma
7:30 PM	Cabral 45+1'	Report	Tejada 55'; Fjeldberg 60'	Stadium: ONEOK Field; Attendance: 4,202; Referee: Matthew Thompson

July 4 14	FC Tulsa	v	Sacramento Republic FC	Tulsa, Oklahoma
7:30 PM		Report		Stadium: ONEOK Field
Note: Postponed due to inclement weather

July 18 15	FC Tulsa	1–0	El Paso Locomotive FC	Tulsa, Oklahoma
7:30 PM	Batista 45+1'	Report		Stadium: ONEOK Field; Attendance: 4,022; Referee: Muhammad Kaleia

July 25 16	FC Tulsa	0–0	Lexington SC	Tulsa, Oklahoma
7:30 PM		Report		Stadium: ONEOK Field; Attendance: 3,496; Referee: Jeremy Scheer

July 29 17	Pittsburgh Riverhounds SC	0–1	FC Tulsa	Pittsburgh, Pennsylvania
6:00 PM		Report	Dorsey 13'; Cissoko (yellow card) 31'	Stadium: Highmark Stadium; Attendance: 4,681; Referee: Brandon Stevis

August 8 18	FC Tulsa	0–1	Detroit City FC	Tulsa, Oklahoma
7:30 PM		Report	Smith 51'	Stadium: ONEOK Field; Attendance: 3,537; Referee: Servando Berna Rico

August 15 19	New Mexico United	1―0	FC Tulsa	Albuquerque, New Mexico
7:30 PM	Hurst 83' (pen.)	Report	Clarke (yellow card) 81'	Stadium: Isotopes Park; Attendance: 9,467; Referee: Elton García

August 22 20	Orange County SC	1―5	FC Tulsa	Irvine, California
9:00 PM	Hergardt 47'; Tubbs (yellow card) 67'	Report	Ordóñez 4', 20', 55', (yellow card) 90+4'; Sangwa (yellow card) 28'; Kocevski (yellow card) 33'; Webber (yellow card) 39'; Pierre 69'; Dorsey 72'; Wilson (yellow card) 90+3'	Stadium: Championship Soccer Stadium; Attendance: 4,913; Referee: Muhammad Kaleia

August 29 21	FC Tulsa	1–0	Rhode Island FC	Tulsa, Oklahoma
7:30 PM	Kocevski 8'	Report		Stadium: ONEOK Field; Attendance: 4,540; Referee: Mark Verso

September 5 22	San Antonio FC	0–0	FC Tulsa	San Antonio, Texas
7:30 PM		Report		Stadium: Toyota Field; Attendance: 5,160; Referee: Lukasz Szpala

September 12 23	Phoenix Rising FC	2–1	FC Tulsa	Phoenix, Arizona
9:00 PM	Badji 6'; Studenthofft 88'	Report	Pierre 90+4'	Stadium: Phoenix Rising Soccer Stadium; Attendance: 6,191; Referee: Muhammad Hassan

September 19 24	Brooklyn FC	2–2	FC Tulsa	Brooklyn, New York
6:00 PM	Alves (red card) 17'; Kanté 64'; McNamara 90+1' (pen.)	Report	Eisner 29'; Pierre 37'	Stadium: Maimonides Park

September 25 25	El Paso Locomotive FC	v	FC Tulsa	El Paso, Texas
9:00 PM	Avila 17'	Report	Dorsey 8'	Stadium: Southwest University Park; Referee: Gerald Flores

September 30 26	FC Tulsa	1–0	New Mexico United	Tulsa, Oklahoma
7:00 PM	Wilson 19'	Report	Hamalainen (yellow card) 45+2' (yellow-red card) 54'	Stadium: ONEOK Field; Attendance: 4,610

October 3 27	FC Tulsa	1–1	Sacramento Republic FC	Tulsa, Oklahoma
7:00 PM	Ordóñez 9' (pen.)	Report	Rodríguez 89'	Stadium: ONEOK Field; Attendance: 4,695

October 9 28	Lexington SC	0–0	FC Tulsa	Lexington, Kentucky
7:30 PM		Report		Stadium: Lexington SC Stadium; Attendance: 5,102; Referee: Elton García

October 17 29	FC Tulsa	2–4	Oakland Roots SC	Tulsa, Oklahoma
	Dorsey 3', 49'	Report	Prentice 21', 60'; Wilson 83'; Jacquesson 87'	Stadium: ONEOK Field; Attendance: 5,012; Referee: Calin Radosav

October 24 30	Colorado Springs Switchbacks FC	2–0	FC Tulsa	Colorado Springs, Colorado
8:00 PM	Bennett 31' (pen.); Burner (yellow card) 35' (yellow-red card) 45+6'; Williams 60'	Report		Stadium: Weidner Field; Attendance: 7,425; Referee: Rodrigo Albuquerque

=== USL Championship Playoffs ===
As the seventh seed in the Western Conference, FC Tulsa qualified for the playoffs, matched up in the quarter-finals against Sacramento Republic FC in Sacramento. Despite holding the home team scoreless for most of the match, Sacramento scored in the 88th minute, eliminating FC Tulsa from the playoffs and ending FC Tulsa's season.

November 1 Quarter-finals	Sacramento Republic FC	1–0	FC Tulsa	Sacramento, California
9:00 PM ET	Midence (yellow card) 43'; Crisostomo (yellow card) 61'; Kaye (yellow card) 83'; Willey 88'; Edwards (yellow card) 89'	Report	Wilson (yellow card) 45+2'	Stadium: Heart Health Park; Attendance: 10,338; Referee: Ekaterina Koroleva

=== U.S. Open Cup. ===
FC Tulsa entered the 2026 US Open Cup away against Arkansas-based club Little Rock Rangers, an amateur club that plays in the USL League Two. Following an easy rout of the Rangers, FC Tulsa was matched up at home against San Antonio FC, who also plays in the USL Championship. FC Tulsa ultimately secured victory against San Antonio with an added extra time goal, which secured them a ticket into the Round of 32, where they were scheduled away in St. Louis against first-division MLS club St. Louis City SC.

March 18 Round 1	(Arkansas) Little Rock Rangers (USL2)	2–4	(Oklahoma) FC Tulsa (USLC)	Little Rock, Arkansas
8:00 PM ET	Kistmann 51'; Turner 85'	Report	St Clair 19'; Webber 32'; Batista 70'; Pierre 85'	Stadium: Episcopal Collegiate School; Attendance: 1,200; Referee: Carson Alston

April 1 Round 2	San Antonio FC (USLC) (Texas)	0–1 (a.e.t.)	(Oklahoma) FC Tulsa (USLC)	San Antonio, Texas
8:30 p.m. ET		Report	Cabral 105'	Stadium: Toyota Field; Attendance: 2,434; Referee: Muhammad Kaleia

April 15 Round of 32	(Missouri) St. Louis City SC (MLS)	4–0	(Oklahoma) FC Tulsa (USLC)	St. Louis, Missouri
8:00 PM ET	Hartel 20'; Sang-Bin 36'; Joyner 61'; Ostrák 78'	Report		Stadium: Energizer Park; Referee: Servando Berna Rico

=== USL Cup ===
FC Tulsa participated in the third edition of the USL Cup, and the second edition to feature teams from both the USL Championship and League One.

==== Group 3 ====
Pos	Lg	Team	Pld	W	PKW	PKL	L	GF	GA	GD	Pts	Qualification
1	USLC	San Antonio FC	4	3	1	0	0	5	1	+4	11	Advance to knockout stage
2	USLC	Birmingham Legion FC	4	2	1	1	0	7	2	+5	9	
3	USL1	One Knoxville SC	4	0	3	0	1	3	4	−1	6	
4	USLC	FC Tulsa	4	1	0	1	2	4	6	−2	4	
5	USL1	Corpus Christi FC	4	1	0	1	2	2	5	−3	4	
6	USL1	Chattanooga Red Wolves SC	4	0	0	2	2	2	5	−3	2	

Rules for classification: 1) points; 2) goals for in cup match play (only for determining wild card); 3) head-to-head points earned in small group play; 4) total wins in small group play; 5) total wins in all cup matches; 6) goals for in small group play; 7) goals for in cup match play; 8) goals assisted in cup match play; 9) goal differential in cup match play; 10) disciplinary points; 11) coin toss.

==== Match results ====
April 25	FC Tulsa	1–1 (3–2 p)	One Knoxville SC	Tulsa, Oklahoma
7:00 PM	Cabral 73'	Report	Baker 36'	Stadium: ONEOK Field; Attendance: 3,200; Referee: Igor Bych
	Penalties
	Lapa (penalty scored); Pierre (penalty missed); Sparks (penalty missed); Damm (penalty missed); Kocevski (penalty missed)		(penalty missed) Diene; (penalty scored) Conway; (penalty scored) Fernández; (penalty scored) Baker; (penalty missed) Murphy

May 16	Corpus Christi FC	0–1	FC Tulsa	Corpus Christi, Texas
7:30 PM		Report	Cabral 80'	Stadium: Cabaniss Athletic Complex; Attendance: 615; Referee: Mark Verso

June 6	FC Tulsa	1–2	San Antonio FC	Tulsa, Oklahoma
7:30 PM	Cabral 18'	Report	Maldonado 51'; Henderson 90+1'	Stadium: ONEOK Field; Attendance: 4,953; Referee: Nabil Bensalah

July 11	Birmingham Legion FC	3–1	FC Tulsa	Birmingham, Alabama
8:00 PM	Vassell 28', 84'; Williams 90+3'	Report	Dorsey 33'	Stadium: Protective Stadium; Attendance: 3,327; Referee: Gerald Flores
