= Facundo Torres =

Uruguayan footballer (born 2000)

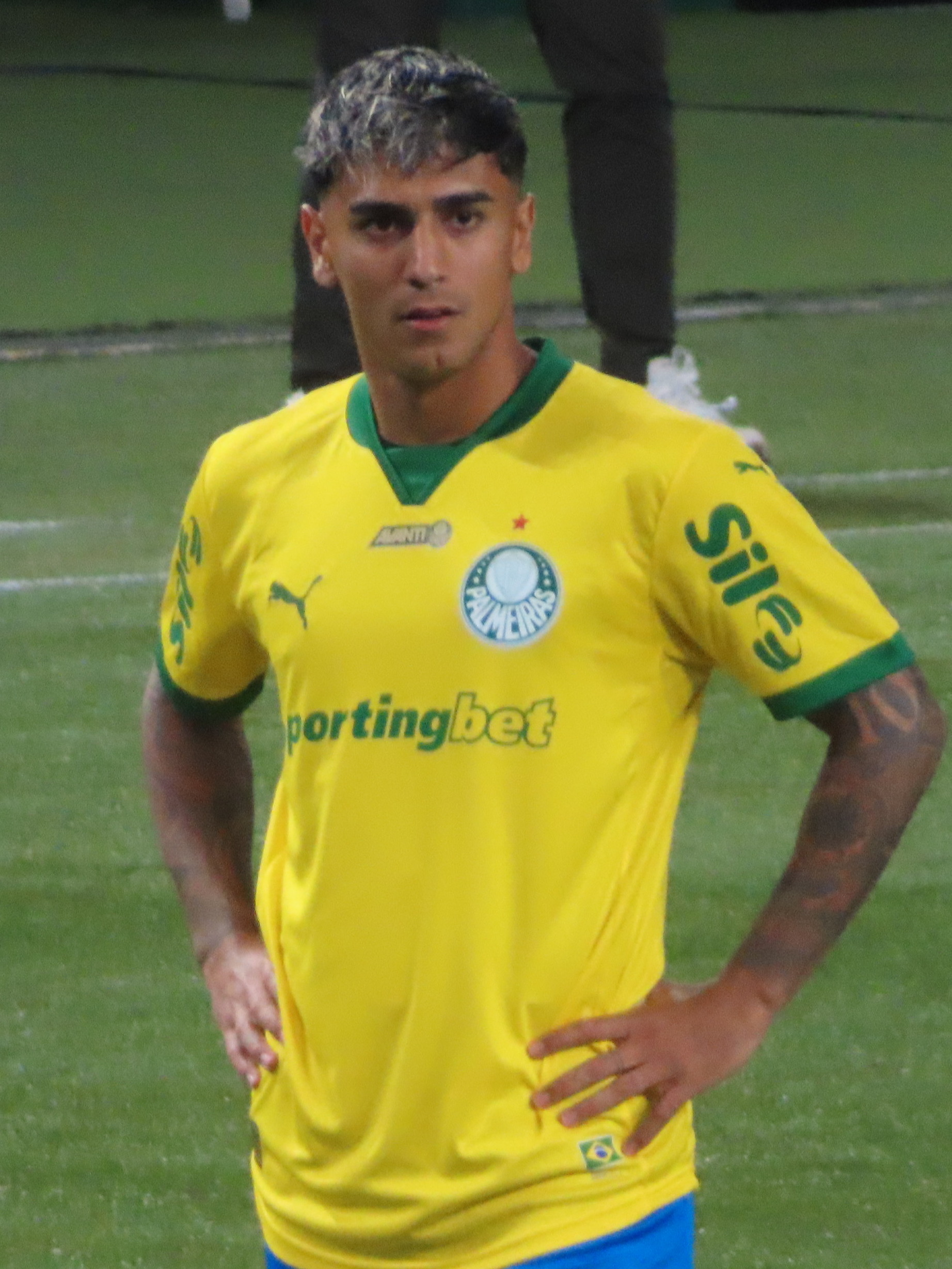
- Torres with Palmeiras in 2025

Personal information
- Full name: Facundo Daniel Torres Pérez
- Date of birth: 13 April 2000 (age 26)
- Place of birth: Colón Centro y Noroeste, Montevideo, Uruguay
- Height: 1.77 m (5 ft 10 in)
- Positions: Attacking midfielder; winger

Team information
- Current team: Austin FC
- Number: 11

Youth career
- 2010–2020: Peñarol

Senior career*
Years	Team	Apps	(Gls)
2020–2022	Peñarol	51	(10)
2022–2024	Orlando City	95	(37)
2025–2026	Palmeiras	43	(7)
2026–	Austin FC	33	(4)

International career^{‡}
2014–2015	Uruguay U15	20	(14)
2016–2017	Uruguay U17	28	(14)
2018	Uruguay U20	6	(1)
2021–	Uruguay	23	(2)
- * Club domestic league appearances and goals as of 00:40, 1 November 2026 (UTC) ‡ National team caps and goals as of 18 November 2025

Facundo Daniel Torres Pérez (born 13 April 2000) is a Uruguayan professional footballer who plays as an attacking midfielder or winger for Major League Soccer club Austin FC and the Uruguay national team.

Torres previously played for Peñarol where he won the 2021 Uruguayan Primera División title and for Orlando City, where he helped win the 2022 U.S. Open Cup, their first trophy since becoming a Major League Soccer franchise.

In 2025, Torres joined Série A club Palmeiras where he finished as runners-up in both the league and Copa Libertadores to Flamengo, but after one season in Brazil he returned to Major League Soccer with Austin FC.

== Early life ==
Torres was born on 13 April 2000, in the Colón Centro y Noroeste neighborhood of Montevideo, but grew up in La Paz, Canelones. At the age of four, Torres attended his first football training session with his cousin Joaquín at Juventud River de La Paz but showed little interest and instead sat in the middle of the field and played with dirt. His father later took him to La Paz Wanderers where he enjoyed playing with friends before spending a year with Defensor Sporting.

At the age of 10 he was selected to play in the National Championship final to represent the regional southern league in Melo where he was scouted by Peñarol and invited to join their academy. With Peñarol, Torres traveled to Brazil to play in the Encontro de Futebol Infantil Pan-americano, a friendly international competition for academy teams. Despite being two years younger than his teammates such as Federico Valverde, Diego Rossi and Santiago Bueno, Torres was a standout player at the tournament. Coached by Robert Lima, Torres continued to be fast-tracked through the age groups and in 2014, helped Peñarol to an under-15 national title.

In February 2016, Torres was invited to train with the professional senior team for the first time, at the age of 15. That same year, Italian Serie A club Juventus made an attempt to sign Torres via his agent Daniel Fonseca. Torres' father opposed the move, thinking he was too young and describing it as "via the back door," parting ways with Fonseca as a result with Torres remaining at Peñarol to continue his development and earn playing time.

== Club career ==
=== Peñarol ===
==== 2020: First senior debut ====
Torres was named in a senior match day squad for the first time on 7 June 2018, as an unused substitute against Defensor Sporting. Moving between the first team and reserves under both Leonardo Ramos and Diego López without ever debuting, Torres was handed his senior debut by Diego Forlán on 16 August 2020 in a 2–0 Primera División win against Boston River. He came on as a 46th minute substitute for Matías de los Santos and scored his team's opening goal five minutes later. He made his continental debut in the delayed 2020 Copa Libertadores group stage, starting all four of the remaining games and scoring once in a 3–0 victory over Chilean side Colo-Colo. In his debut season, Torres made 34 appearances and scored 10 goals across all competitions.

==== 2021: Championship winners ====
Torres scored four goals during Peñarol's run to the 2021 Copa Sudamericana semi-finals before being eliminated by eventual winners Athletico Paranaense. In his final competitive appearance for the club, Torres scored the equalizer in the semi-finals of the 2021 Uruguayan Primera División championship play-offs on 7 December, bringing Peńarol to a 1–1 draw with Torneo Apertura winners Plaza Colonia. Peńarol won the shoot-out 8–7. Because Peńarol had the most aggregate points of the regular season, they were crowned champions without a finals. Torres made 33 appearances and scored 10 goals across all competitions during his final season at the club.

=== Orlando City ===
==== 2022: First season in MLS, U.S. Open Cup victory, and club record goal contributions ====
On 24 January, Torres signed for Major League Soccer club Orlando City on a four-year Young Designated Player contract with the option for a fifth. He joined for a reported club record $9 million fee. Torres debuted on 11 February for Orlando in a preseason friendly with Colorado Rapids, resulting in a 1–1 draw. On 19 March, Torres scored his first goal for the club in a 1–0 win over LA Galaxy. Torres scored his first brace for Orlando, his second goal being a penalty kick, in a 3–0 win over Sacramento Republic FC in the final of the 2022 U.S. Open Cup on 7 September, thus securing the club's first trophy since becoming an MLS franchise in 2015. With four goals, Torres was the joint-highest goalscorer in the competition.

In his first season with the club Orlando placed 7th in the Eastern Conference, securing the club entry into the play-offs. Orlando was eliminated by CF Montréal in the first round in a 2–0 defeat. Torres scored nine goals in the regular season and assisted 10 others, tying him second overall in goal contributions in a regular season for the club with Kevin Molino and Kaká and behind Nani. Overall, Torres made 40 appearances for Orlando, scored 13 goals, and made 12 assists across all competitions, the most goal contributions (25) in club history at the time.

==== 2023: Second-consecutive leading goal contributor ====
In the following season due to Orlando City winning the U.S. Open Cup the previous year, the club qualified for the 2023 CONCACAF Champions League, the team's first time in the competition. Orlando made a first round exit on the away goals rules following a 1–1 draw over two legs against Tigres UANL.

In the 2023 U.S. Open Cup, Orlando were defending champions but were beaten 1–0 by Charlotte FC in the round of 32. Torres scored his first ever regular season brace for the club in a 3–0 victory over New York Red Bulls on 3 June. He made his debut Leagues Cup appearance with a start against Houston Dynamo in the first round of the group stage. The Lions drew 1–1, followed up with a 5–4 penalty shoot-out victory in which Torres scored the winning penalty. Orlando was eliminated in a 3–1 loss to Inter Miami in the round of 32. Torres achieved double digit regular season goals for the first time in his career with a brace in a 2–1 victory over St. Louis City on 26 August.

On 30 September, during a match against CF Montréal, Torres simulated being struck in the face by George Campbell, resulting in Campbell receiving a yellow card. Three days later, Torres was fined by the MLS Disciplinary Committee for violating the simulation-embellishment policy. In total, Torres scored 14 goals in 39 appearances in all competitions, second on the team behind rookie Duncan McGuire. However, with a further five assists, Torres' 19 goal contributions led the team.

==== 2024: Contract extension, new kit number, new club goal contributions record, and club top-scorer ====
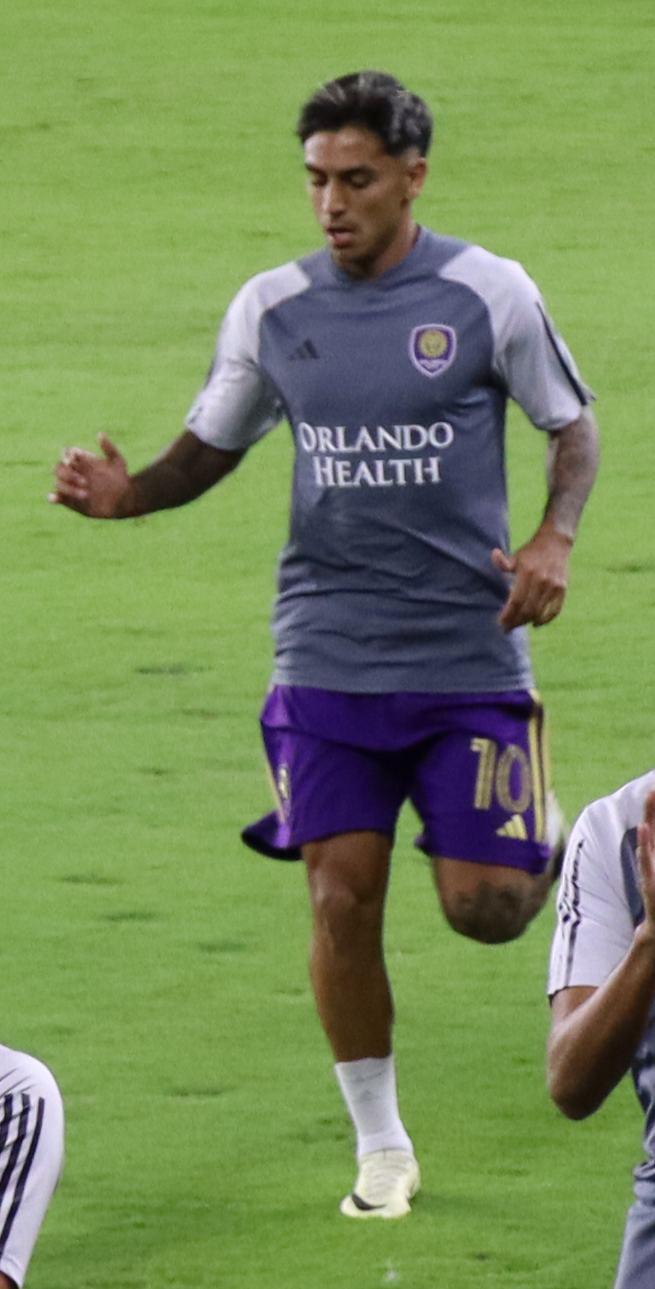
Torres with Orlando City in 2024

On 10 January, it was announced that Torres had signed a contract extension with the club through 2026, with options to extend further in 2027 and 2028. Torres also switched squad number from 17 to the number 10, which had last been worn by departing captain Mauricio Pereyra. On 21 February 2024, Torres opened the competitive 2024 campaign with a brace against Cavalry FC in the first leg of their tie in the 2024 CONCACAF Champions Cup, helping secure a 3–0 victory. Torres ended as the club's 2024 CONCACAF Champions Cup top scorer after they were eliminated 4–2 on aggregate in the second leg of the round of 16 by Tigres UANL with three goals scored. On 22 June, Torres scored a brace in a 4–2 victory over Chicago Fire on his 100th appearance for the club across all competitions. On 31 August, Torres scored a brace in a 3–0 win over Nashville SC, a performance which would see him named to the Team of the Matchday three days later.

Torres was again named to the Team of the Matchday for goal and overall performance against Charlotte FC on 18 September. On 28 September, Torres scored the third goal of a 3–1 victory at FC Dallas, allowing him to tie Cyle Larin for the most goals for the club across all competitions with 44. Torres' goal also allowed him to surpass the club record he set in 2022 for the most goal contributions in a single season with 17 goals and nine assists, totaling 26. In the following match on 2 October, Torres scored his 18th goal of the campaign when he scored the first goal of a 2–1 win over Philadelphia Union, allowing him to surpass Larin's record and tie Dom Dwyer's combined USL and MLS goal scoring record.

On 27 October, Torres scored his 19th goal of the season in Orlando's opening playoffs match against Charlotte FC in a 2–0 victory, allowing him to surpass Larin's record for the most goals in a single season across all competitions for the club and surpass Dwyer's combined goal scoring record. In total, Torres scored 20 goals in 44 appearances across all competitions, the most in club history, and he also assisted nine goals, totaling 29 goal contributions, another club record.

=== Palmeiras ===
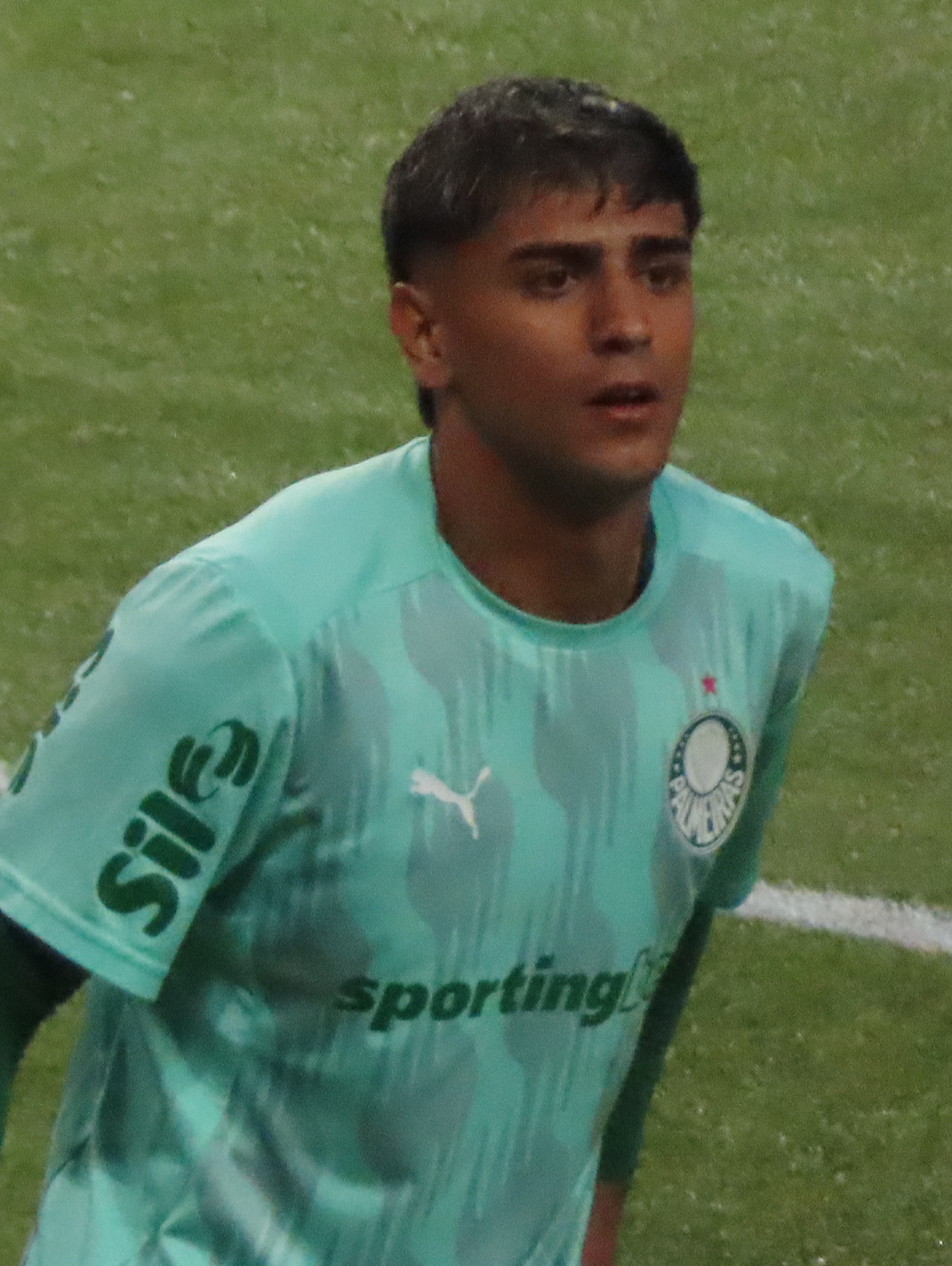
Torres with Palmeiras in 2025

On 20 December 2024, it was announced that Torres had been transferred to Brazilian club Palmeiras for an Orlando City club record fee of reportedly up to $14 million. Torres signed to a five-year contract until the end of 2029 and he expressed delight about being reunited with former Peñarol teammate Joaquín Piquerez.

On 18 January 2025, Torres made his debut for the club in the Campeonato Paulista in a 1–1 draw against Noroeste. In Torres' next appearance on 25 January he scored his first goal for the club, the opening goal of a 2–1 loss to Novorizontino. On 16 April, Torres scored his first Série A goal, the lone goal of a 1–0 win at Internacional. On 19 June, Torres made his FIFA Club World Cup debut as Palmeiras defeated Egyptian club Al Ahly 2–0 in the second group stage match. On 4 July, Palmeiras was eliminated by English club Chelsea in the quarter-finals in a 2–1 loss with Torres playing each game except the first group stage match. On 29 November, Palmeiras reached the final of 2025 Copa Libertadores, but were defeated 1–0 by Flamengo and in the second-to-last matchday of the season also lost the league to Flamengo.

=== Austin FC ===
On 23 January 2026, Torres signed with Major League Soccer club Austin FC, cementing his return to the league after one season. Torres joined on a four-and-a-half year designated player contract with a team option for another year. On 21 February, Torres made his debut in a 2–2 draw against Minnesota United and provided an assist to Brendan Hines-Ike's opening goal. Torres scored his first goal for Austin FC in a 3–3 draw with Toronto FC on 18 April.

== International career ==
=== Youth ===
Torres represented Uruguay as a youth international at under-15, under-17 and under-20 level. He was part of Uruguay squad at the 2015 South American U-15 Championship and scored five goals in five games, the joint-third most behind Brazilians Vitinho and Vinícius Júnior, as Uruguay finished runners-up behind Brazil. He is the all-time top scorer for Uruguay under-17s and competed at the 2017 South American U-17 Championship.

=== Senior ===
On 5 March 2021, Torres received his first senior Uruguay national team call-up as part of a 35-man preliminary squad for 2022 FIFA World Cup qualifying matches against Argentina and Bolivia. However, CONMEBOL suspended those matches the next day amid concern over the COVID-19 pandemic.

He made his senior international debut on 3 June in a World Cup qualifier against Paraguay as a 66th-minute substitute for Jonathan Rodríguez as Uruguay drew 0–0. He made his first start five days later in another goalless qualifying draw against Venezuela. In June, Torres was also named to the squad for the 2021 Copa América and appeared in all five games as a substitute. Uruguay were eliminated at the quarter-final stage on penalties by Colombia.

In November 2022, Torres was named to the final 26-man squad for the 2022 FIFA World Cup. He was an unused substitute for all three games as Uruguay was eliminated at the group stage.

On 20 June 2023, Torres scored his first international goal in a 2–0 friendly victory over Cuba. On 4 September, Torres was called up to the squad for the 2026 FIFA World Cup qualifying matches against Chile and Ecuador. He made his campaign debut as a substitute for Maximiliano Araújo against Ecuador in the 70th-minute in a 2–1 loss and also appeared as a 77th-minute substitute for Facundo Pellistri in a 3–0 win over Bolivia.

On 18 March 2024, Torres was called up for friendlies against Basque Country and Ivory Coast. Torres was included in the pre-tournament friendlies squad in the lead-up to the 2024 Copa América and made an appearance against Mexico on 6 June, coming on as a 69th-minute substitute for Darwin Núñez, which ended in a 4–0 victory, but he was ultimately excluded from the final Copa América squad.

On 3 September, Torres was called up for 2026 FIFA World Cup qualifying matches against Paraguay and Venezuela. Torres would come on as an 80th-minute substitute for Brian Rodríguez against Paraguay and again for Rodríguez against Venezuela as a 54th-minute substitute, however Torres would later get substituted off himself in the 88th-minute for Nicolás Fonseca with head coach Marcelo Bielsa explaining that he did this because he felt that Torres had made the team weaker defensively when it needed to be stronger in that regard and that he felt "very sad" doing so.

On 18 March 2025, Torres was called up by Bielsa for 2026 FIFA World Cup qualifying matches against Argentina and Bolivia, but he did not make an appearance. On 3 June, Torres received another call-up for qualifying matches against Paraguay and Venezuela, but he did not make an appearance once again. Following Uruguay's qualification for the 2026 FIFA World Cup, Torres was selected for two friendlies in Malaysia against the Dominican Republic and Uzbekistan on 10 and 13 October. Torres started against the Dominican Republic before being replaced in the second half for Federico Viñas as Uruguay won 1–0. In the following match against Uzbekistan, Torres scored his second senior goal for the national team when he broke the deadlock in a 2–1 win. Torres was again selected for friendlies in the next international window, this time against Mexico in Torreón, Coahuila and the United States in Tampa, Florida on 15 and 21 November respectively.

== Career statistics ==
=== Club ===
As of match played 31 October 2026

Appearances and goals by club, season and competition
Club	Season	League			State league (Note: Includes Campeonato Paulista)		National cup (Note: Includes U.S. Open Cup and Copa do Brasil)		Continental		Other		Total	
Club	Season	Division	Apps	Goals	Apps	Goals	Apps	Goals	Apps	Goals	Apps	Goals	Apps	Goals
Peñarol	2020	Uruguayan Primera División	32	5	—		—		6 (Note: Four appearances, one goal in Copa Libertadores, two appearances in Copa Sudamericana)	1	—		38	6
Peñarol	2021	Uruguayan Primera División	19	5	—		—		13 (Note: Appearances in Copa Sudamericana)	4	1 (Note: Appearance in Uruguayan Primera Division championship playoff)	1	33	10
Peñarol	Total		51	10	—		—		19	5	1	1	71	16
Orlando City	2022	Major League Soccer	33	9	—		6	4	—		1 (Note: Appearance in MLS Cup playoffs)	0	40	13
Orlando City	2023	Major League Soccer	30	14	—		1	0	2 (Note: Appearances in CONCACAF Champions Cup)	0	6 (Note: Three appearances in Leagues Cup, three appearances in MLS Cup playoffs)	0	39	14
Orlando City	2024	Major League Soccer	31	14	—		—		4	3	8 (Note: Three appearances and one goal in Leagues Cup, five appearances and two goals in MLS Cup playoffs)	3	44	20
Orlando City	Total		95	37	—		7	4	6	3	15	3	123	47
Palmeiras	2025	Série A	29	5	14	2	3	0	11 (Note: Appearances in Copa Libertadores)	2	4 (Note: Appearances in FIFA Club World Cup)	0	61	9
Austin FC	2026	Major League Soccer	33	4	—		1	0	—		3 (Note: Appearances in Leagues Cup)	0	37	4
Career total			207	56	14	2	11	4	36	10	23	4	288	76

=== International ===
As of match played 18 November 2025

Appearances and goals by national team and year
National team	Year	Apps	Goals
Uruguay	2021	10	0
Uruguay	2022	0	0
Uruguay	2023	5	1
Uruguay	2024	4 (Note: Includes a Non-FIFA friendly played against the Basque Country, which is counted as an official match by the Uruguayan Football Association.)	0
Uruguay	2025	4	1
Uruguay	2026	0	0
Total		23	2

Scores and results list Uruguay's goal tally first, score column indicates score after each Torres goal.

List of international goals scored by Facundo Torres
No.	Date	Venue	Opponent	Score	Result	Competition
1	20 June 2023	Estadio Centenario, Montevideo, Uruguay	Cuba	1–0	2–0	Friendly
2	13 October 2025	Hang Jebat Stadium, Malacca City, Malaysia	Uzbekistan	1–0	2–1	Friendly

== Honours ==
Peñarol

- Uruguayan Primera División: 2021

Orlando City

- U.S. Open Cup: 2022

Palmeiras

- Copa Libertadores runner-up: 2025

Individual

- Uruguayan Primera División Team of the Year: 2020, 2021
