= 2022 Rochester New York FC season =

Rochester New York FC
2022 season
- Owners: David and Wendy Dworkin; Jamie Vardy
- Head coach: Bruno Baltazar
- Stadium: John L. DiMarco Field
- MLS Next Pro: Eastern Conference: 4th Overall: 9th
- MLS Next Pro Playoffs: Eastern Conference Semifinals
- U.S. Open Cup: Round of 32
- Top goalscorer: League: Gibran Rayo (13); All: Gibran Rayo (14)
- Highest home attendance: 1,878 (September 18)
- Lowest home attendance: 684 (May 14), 267 (April 7) US Open Cup
- Average home league attendance: 1,096
- Biggest win: CLB 0-4 ROC (May 29)
- Biggest defeat: OCB 5-2 ROC (August 17); CLB 4-1 ROC (September 24)
| Home colors | Away colors |

The 2022 Rochester New York FC season was the club's 23rd overall and first in MLS Next Pro. It was the first year since 2017 the club has played, and their first season under the Rochester New York FC name, after spending the first 22 seasons branded as the Rochester Raging Rhinos and Rochester Rhinos. The club was the only independent team playing in MLS Next Pro, and was one of the two teams from the league to participate in the 2022 U.S. Open Cup, alongside St. Louis City SC 2.

In the final game of the regular season, Rochester New York FC confirmed their qualification for the 2022 MLS Next Pro Playoffs after a 2-2 draw with New York City FC II at home, despite losing in the penalty shootout. They were knocked out in the Eastern Conference Semifinals by regular season champions Columbus Crew 2.

== Competitive ==
=== MLS Next Pro ===
==== Standings ====
Eastern Conference

| Pos | Div | Team | Pld | W | SOW | SOL | L | GF | GA | GD | Pts | Qualification |
|---|---|---|---|---|---|---|---|---|---|---|---|---|
| 2 | NE | Toronto FC II | 24 | 12 | 2 | 1 | 9 | 44 | 38 | +6 | 41 | Qualification for the 2022 MLS Next Pro Playoffs |
| 3 | NE | Philadelphia Union II | 24 | 11 | 3 | 1 | 9 | 42 | 39 | +3 | 40 | Qualification for the 2022 MLS Next Pro Playoffs |
| 4 | NE | Rochester New York FC | 24 | 10 | 4 | 2 | 8 | 37 | 30 | +7 | 40 | Qualification for the 2022 MLS Next Pro Playoffs |
| 5 | NE | New York City FC II | 24 | 9 | 4 | 2 | 9 | 49 | 35 | +14 | 37 | |
| 6 | CT | Inter Miami CF II | 24 | 10 | 1 | 4 | 9 | 40 | 49 | −9 | 36 | |

Source: MLSNP Eastern Conference
Rules for classification: 1) points; 2) total wins; 3) total goal differential; 4) total goals scored; 5) fewer disciplinary points; 6) away goal differential; 7) away goals scored; 8) home goals differential; 9) home goals scored; 10) coin toss (2 clubs tied) or drawing of lots (≥3 clubs tied)

Overall table

| Pos | Team | Pld | W | SOW | SOL | L | GF | GA | GD | Pts |
|---|---|---|---|---|---|---|---|---|---|---|
| 7 | Toronto FC II | 24 | 12 | 2 | 1 | 9 | 44 | 38 | +6 | 41 |
| 8 | Philadelphia Union II | 24 | 11 | 3 | 1 | 9 | 42 | 39 | +3 | 40 |
| 9 | Rochester New York FC | 24 | 10 | 4 | 2 | 8 | 37 | 30 | +7 | 40 |
| 10 | New York City FC II | 24 | 9 | 4 | 2 | 9 | 49 | 35 | +14 | 37 |
| 11 | Inter Miami CF II | 24 | 10 | 1 | 4 | 9 | 40 | 49 | −9 | 36 |

Source: MLSNP
Rules for classification: 1) points; 2) total wins; 3) total goal differential; 4) total goals scored; 5) fewer disciplinary points; 6) away goal differential; 7) away goals scored; 8) home goals differential; 9) home goals scored; 10) coin toss (2 clubs tied) or drawing of lots (≥3 clubs tied)

==== Results summary ====
| Overall | | | | | | | | Home | | | | | | Away | | | | | |
| Pld | W | D | L | GF | GA | GD | Pts | W | D | L | GF | GA | GD | W | D | L | GF | GA | GD |
|---|---|---|---|---|---|---|---|---|---|---|---|---|---|---|---|---|---|---|---|
| 24 | 10 | 6 | 8 | 37 | 30 | +7 | 36 | 5 | 4 | 3 | 22 | 14 | +8 | 5 | 2 | 5 | 15 | 16 | −1 |

Last updated: September 21, 2022.
Source: MLS Next Pro

As per MLS Next Pro rules, 1 point is added for any penalty shootout won after a draw.

==== Results ====
| March 25 1 | St. Louis City 2 | 2–0 | Rochester New York FC | St. Louis, MO |
| 4:00 pm EDT | Kuzain 20'; Dias 60'; Armstrong (yellow card) 63' (yellow-red card) 66'; Dolling (yellow card) 75' | Report | Vanacker (yellow card) 19'; Caíque (yellow card) 59'; Popp (yellow card) 90+5' | Stadium: Hermann Stadium; Attendance: 6,012; Referee: Matthew Thompson |

| April 3 2 | New England Revolution II | 3–1 | Rochester New York FC | Foxborough, MA |
| 4:00 pm EDT | O'Hearn (yellow card) 7' (goal) 45+3'; Michel 29'; Zwetsloot (yellow card) 49'; Rivera 64' | Report | Dolabella (yellow card) 37'; Brigida 38'; Djaló (yellow card) 55' | Stadium: Gillette Stadium; Attendance: 188; Referee: Katherine McCormick |

| April 10 3 | Chicago Fire II | 0–0 | Rochester New York FC | Bridgeview, IL |
| 4:00 pm EDT | Monis (yellow card) 20' | Report | Popp (yellow card) 77'; Smith (yellow card) 78' | Stadium: SeatGeek Stadium; Attendance: 240; Referee: Nabil Bensalah |

| April 23 4 | Rochester New York FC | 2–3 | New York City FC II | Brighton, NY |
| 4:00 pm EDT | Inalien 20' (pen.), 65' | Report | Turnbull 32'; Jiminez 48', 90+3' | Stadium: John L. DiMarco Field; Attendance: 722; Referee: Thomas Snyder |

| May 8 5 | FC Cincinnati 2 | 1–2 | Rochester New York FC | Highland Heights, KY |
| | Flanagan 87' | Report | Dolabella 42'; Vanacker 85' | Stadium: NKU Soccer Stadium; Attendance: 213; Referee: Nabil Bensalah |

| May 14 6 | Rochester New York FC | 4–1 | Inter Miami CF II | Brighton, NY |
| 4:00 pm EDT | Williams 10'; Dolabella 20'; Akanyirige 50'; Batiz 56' | Report | Thomas 60' | Stadium: John L. DiMarco Field; Attendance: 684; Referee: Katherine McCormick |

| May 21 7 | Rochester New York FC | 3–0 | Philadelphia Union II | Brighton, NY |
| | Dolabella 33', 90+2'; Akanyirige (yellow card) 49' (yellow-red card) 61'; Rayo 62' (pen.) | Report | Riasco (yellow card) 41'; Craig (yellow card) 62' | Stadium: John L. DiMarco Field; Attendance: 761; Referee: Abdou Ndiaye |

| May 29 8 | Columbus Crew 2 | 0–4 | Rochester New York FC | Columbus, OH |
| 2:00 pm EDT | | Report | Rayo 23', 71'; Garrett 62'; Costa 89' | Stadium: Historic Crew Stadium; Attendance: 304; Referee: Nabil Bensalah |

| June 2 9 | Rochester New York FC | 1–1 (4–3 SO) | Toronto FC II | Brighton, NY |
| 7:00 PM EDT | Batiz 78' | Report | Antonoglou 85' | Stadium: John L. DiMarco Field; Attendance: 891; Referee: Nickrod Fateh |
| | Shootout |
| | Rayo (penalty scored); Lopez (penalty scored); Costa (penalty scored); Djaló (penalty missed); Dolabella (penalty scored) | | Coello Camarero (penalty scored); Franklin (penalty scored); Karajovanovic (penalty missed); Yeates (penalty scored); Mbongue (penalty missed) |

| June 11 10 | FC Cincinnati 2 | 1–0 | Rochester New York FC | Highland Heights, KY |
| 8:00 PM EDT | Markanich 90' | Report | | Stadium: NKU Soccer Stadium; Attendance: 321; Referee: Christian Centeno |

| June 18 11 | New England Revolution II | 1–1 (4–5 SO) | Rochester New York FC | Foxborough, MA |
| 7:00 PM EDT | Dos Santos (yellow card) 30'; Lima 59' | Report | Rayo 23'; Djaló (yellow card) 71' | Stadium: Gillette Stadium; Attendance: 218; Referee: Lorenzo Hernandez |
| | Shootout |
| | Dias (penalty scored); Buck (penalty scored); Michel (penalty missed); O'Hearn (penalty scored); Panayotou (penalty scored) | | Rayo (penalty scored); Lopez (penalty scored); Inalien (penalty scored); Dolabella (penalty scored); Akanyirige (penalty scored) |

| June 24 12 | Rochester New York FC | 0–0 (4–2 SO) | Columbus Crew 2 | Brighton, NY |
| 7:00 PM EDT | | Report | | Stadium: John L. DiMarco Field; Attendance: 1,183; Referee: José Carlos Rivero |
| | Shootout |
| | Costa (penalty missed); Batiz (penalty scored); Rissi (penalty scored); Lopez (penalty scored); Dolabella (penalty scored) | | Micaletto (penalty scored); Mohamed (penalty missed); Fuson (penalty missed); Tuffour (penalty scored) |

| July 1 13 | Rochester New York FC | 3–2 | Orlando City B | Brighton, NY |
| 7:00pm EDT | Batista 19', (yellow card) 69'; Rayo 45+1', 62'; Garrett (yellow card) 68'; Rissi (yellow card) 71'; Lopez (yellow card) 82' | Report | Yan (yellow card) 54'; Lynn 65'; Rivera (yellow card) 69'; Acosta 90+6' | Stadium: John L. DiMarco Field; Attendance: 998; Referee: Kaitlyn Trowbridge |

| July 7 14 | Rochester New York FC | 3–0 | Philadelphia Union II | Brighton, NY |
| 7:00pm EDT | Rayo 24', 28', 60' | Report | | Stadium: John L. DiMarco Field; Attendance: 1,019; Referee: Jeremy Scheer |

| July 16 15 | New York City FC II | 0–1 | Rochester New York FC | Queens, NY |
| 7:00pm EDT | | Report | Inalien 77' | Stadium: Belson Stadium; Attendance: 756; Referee: Albert Kyei-Mensah |

| July 22 16 | Rochester New York FC | 0–2 | FC Cincinnati 2 | Brighton, NY |
| | Akanyirige (yellow card) 16'; Popp (yellow card) 57'; Soares (yellow card) 76'; Batista (yellow card) 90' | Report | Thomas (yellow card) 39'; Atanga 44'; Bailey (yellow card) 52'; Sunderland (yellow card) 80'; Daley 84'; Samways (yellow card) 90+3' | Stadium: John L. DiMarco Field; Attendance: 961; Referee: Shawn Tehini |

| July 30 17 | Rochester New York FC | 1–1 (4–5 SO) | Chicago Fire II | Brighton, NY |
| 7:00pm EDT | Garrett (yellow card) 57'; Rayo (yellow card) 68', (goal) 70' | Report | Ostrem (yellow card) 54'; Rodriguez 76'; Baumgartner (yellow card) 83'; Ritaccio (yellow card) 85' | Stadium: John L. DiMarco Field; Attendance: 1,327; Referee: Nickrod Fateh |
| | Shootout |
| | Rayo (penalty missed); Costa (penalty scored); Batiz (penalty scored); Inalien (penalty scored); Dolabella (penalty scored); Garrett (penalty missed) | | Penn (penalty scored); Monis (penalty scored); Fleming (penalty scored); Kidd (penalty missed); Rodriguez (penalty scored); Quintos (penalty scored) |

| August 12 18 | Rochester New York FC | 1–2 | Toronto FC II | Brighton, NY |
| 7:00pm EDT | Rayo 68' | Report | Greenidge-Duncan 14'; Walkes 76' | Stadium: John L. DiMarco Field; Attendance: 1,445; Referee: Thomas Snyder |

| August 17 19 | Orlando City B | 5–2 | Rochester New York FC | Kissimmee, FL |
| 7:00 PM EDT | Akindele 34'; Lynn 47'; Cartagena 58'; Angulo 68'; Loyola 69' | Report | Batiz 25'; Djaló 72' | Stadium: Osceola Heritage Park; Attendance: 225; Referee: Katherine McCormick |

| August 21 20 | Inter Miami CF II | 2–1 | Rochester New York FC | Fort Lauderdale, FL |
| 7:00 PM EDT | Acosta 54'; Borgelin 66' | Report | Williams 90' | Stadium: DRV PNK Stadium; Attendance: 654; Referee: Luis Arroyo |

| August 27 21 | Rochester New York FC | 2–0 | New England Revolution II | Brighton, NY |
| 5:30pm EDT | Rayo 5' (pen.); Williams 43' | Report | Quiñones (red card) 86' | Stadium: John L. DiMarco Field; Attendance: 1,284; Referee: Albert Kyei-Mensah |

| September 4 22 | Philadelphia Union II | 1–2 | Rochester New York FC | Chester, PA |
| 3:30pm EDT | Donovan 62' | Report | Inalien 44'; Williams 90+3' | Stadium: Subaru Park; Attendance: 479; Referee: Nabil Bensalah |

| September 11 23 | Toronto FC II | 0–1 | Rochester New York FC | Toronto, ON |
| 3:00pm EDT | | Report | Batiz 17' | Stadium: York Lions Stadium; Attendance: 332; Referee: Mario Alayass |

| September 18 24 | Rochester New York FC | 2–2 (3–5 SO) | New York City FC II | Brighton, NY |
| 3:00pm EDT | Dolabella 57'; Rayo 71' (pen.) | Report | Jimenez 34'; Denis 68' (pen.) | Stadium: John L. DiMarco Field; Attendance: 1,878; Referee: Jeremy Scheer |
| | Shootout |
| | Lopez (penalty scored); Rayo (penalty scored); Costa (penalty missed); Batiz (penalty scored) | | Denis (penalty scored); Jimenez (penalty scored); Benalcazar (penalty scored); Elias (penalty scored); Owusu (penalty scored) |

=== MLS Next Pro Playoffs ===
| September 24 Eastern Conference Semifinals | Columbus Crew 2 | 4–1 | Rochester New York FC | Columbus, OH |
| 3:00 PM EDT | Parente (yellow card) 36'; Malou (yellow card) 40'; Russell-Rowe 44', 83', 85'; Micaletto 50' (yellow card) 53' | Report | Lopez (yellow card) 5'; Edwards (yellow card) 40'; Akanyirige (yellow card) 50'; Dolabella (yellow card) 52'; Brigida 90+2' | Stadium: Historic Crew Stadium; Attendance: 1,147; Referee: Samantha Martinez |

=== U.S. Open Cup ===
Rochester New York is one of only two MLS Next Pro clubs eligible for the US Open Cup, being an independent team.

| April 7 Second round | Rochester New York FC (MLSNP) (New York (state)) | 1–0 | (New York (state)) Lansdowne Yonkers (NAC) | Brighton, NY |
| 4:00 pm EDT | Rayo 45+5' | | | Stadium: John L. DiMarco Field at Monroe Community College; Attendance: 267 |

| April 20 Third round | Rochester New York FC (MLSNP) (New York (state)) | 2–2 (4–3 p) | (New Jersey) FC Motown (NPSL) | Brighton, NY |
| 6:00 pm EDT | Dolabella 22'; Inalien 38' | | Duka 40'; Fala 90+1', | Stadium: John L. DiMarco Field; Attendance: 396 |

| May 11 Round of 32 | New York City FC (MLS) (New York (state)) | 3–1 | (New York (state)) Rochester New York FC (MLSNP) | Queens, NY |
| 7:00 PM EDT | Thiago Andrade 23'; Héber 31'; Chanot 76' | Report | Batiz 45+3' | Stadium: Belson Stadium; Attendance: 1,002; Referee: Ernie Constantine |

== Squad statistics ==
As of match played September 24, 2022

Starting appearances are listed first, followed by substitute appearances after the + symbol where applicable.

| No. | Pos | Nat | Player | Total | | MLS Next Pro | | Playoffs | | U.S. Open Cup | |
| No. | Pos | Nat | Player | Apps | Goals | Apps | Goals | Apps | Goals | Apps | Goals |
Goalkeepers
| 1 | GK | (United States) USA | Phillip Ejimadu | 4 | 0 | 0+1 | 0 | 0 | 0 | 3 | 0 |
| 31 | GK | (United States) USA | Matheus Franca | 0 | 0 | 0 | 0 | 0 | 0 | 0 | 0 |
| 97 | GK | (Brazil) BRA | Caíque | 26 | 0 | 24 | 0 | 1 | 0 | 0+1 | 0 |
Defenders
| 2 | DF | (United States) USA | Gerardo Lopez | 24 | 0 | 22 | 0 | 1 | 0 | 1 | 0 |
| 3 | DF | (United States) USA | Christian Wood | 22 | 0 | 16+3 | 0 | 0+1 | 0 | 2 | 0 |
| 4 | DF | (United States) USA | Ian Garrett | 23 | 1 | 19+1 | 1 | 0+1 | 0 | 1+1 | 0 |
| 14 | DF | (United States) USA | Michael Smith | 2 | 0 | 0+2 | 0 | 0 | 0 | 0 | 0 |
| 15 | DF | (United States) USA | Lamar Batista | 25 | 1 | 22 | 1 | 1 | 0 | 2 | 0 |
| 21 | DF | (United States) USA | Jacob Akanyirige | 20 | 1 | 16+1 | 1 | 1 | 0 | 2 | 0 |
| 22 | DF | (Belgium) BEL | Milan Vanacker | 8 | 1 | 5 | 1 | 0 | 0 | 2+1 | 0 |
| 23 | DF | (Brazil) BRA | Gustavo Rissi | 13 | 0 | 10 | 0 | 0 | 0 | 3 | 0 |
| 26 | DF | (United States) USA | Ryan Firestone | 1 | 0 | 0+1 | 0 | 0 | 0 | 0 | 0 |
Midfielders
| 5 | MF | (Brazil) BRA | Pedro Dolabella | 27 | 6 | 24 | 5 | 1 | 0 | 2 | 1 |
| 6 | MF | (Portugal) POR | Bubacar Djaló | 27 | 1 | 22+1 | 1 | 1 | 0 | 3 | 0 |
| 7 | MF | (Cape Verde) CPV | Paulo Soares | 11 | 0 | 3+7 | 0 | 0 | 0 | 0+1 | 0 |
| 8 | MF | (England) ENG | Ed Williams | 23 | 4 | 18+2 | 4 | 1 | 0 | 1+1 | 0 |
| 10 | MF | (Brazil) BRA | Gabriel Costa | 24 | 1 | 3+17 | 1 | 0+1 | 0 | 2+1 | 0 |
| 11 | MF | (Honduras) HON | Jesus Batiz | 28 | 5 | 20+4 | 4 | 1 | 0 | 2+1 | 1 |
| 17 | MF | (United States) USA | Raymond Drai | 13 | 0 | 0+10 | 0 | 0 | 0 | 1+2 | 0 |
| 18 | MF | (Ghana) GHA | Opi Edwards | 4 | 0 | 1+2 | 0 | 1 | 0 | 0 | 0 |
| 30 | MF | (United States) USA | Brennan McDermott | 1 | 0 | 0+1 | 0 | 0 | 0 | 0 | 0 |
Forwards
| 9 | FW | (United States) USA | Wilterlynd Inalien | 21 | 5 | 11+7 | 4 | 1 | 0 | 2 | 1 |
| 12 | FW | (United States) USA | Dante Brigida | 21 | 2 | 6+12 | 1 | 0+1 | 1 | 0+2 | 0 |
| 20 | FW | (United States) USA | Davis Smith | 5 | 0 | 0+4 | 0 | 0 | 0 | 0+1 | 0 |
| 27 | FW | (Jamaica) JAM | Warner Brown | 3 | 0 | 0+3 | 0 | 0 | 0 | 0 | 0 |
| 44 | FW | (United States) USA | Gibran Rayo | 27 | 14 | 21+2 | 13 | 1 | 0 | 3 | 1 |
| 88 | FW | (Canada) CAN | Preston Popp | 10 | 0 | 1+7 | 0 | 0 | 0 | 1+1 | 0 |
