= 2022 FC Cincinnati 2 season =

FC Cincinnati 2
2022 season
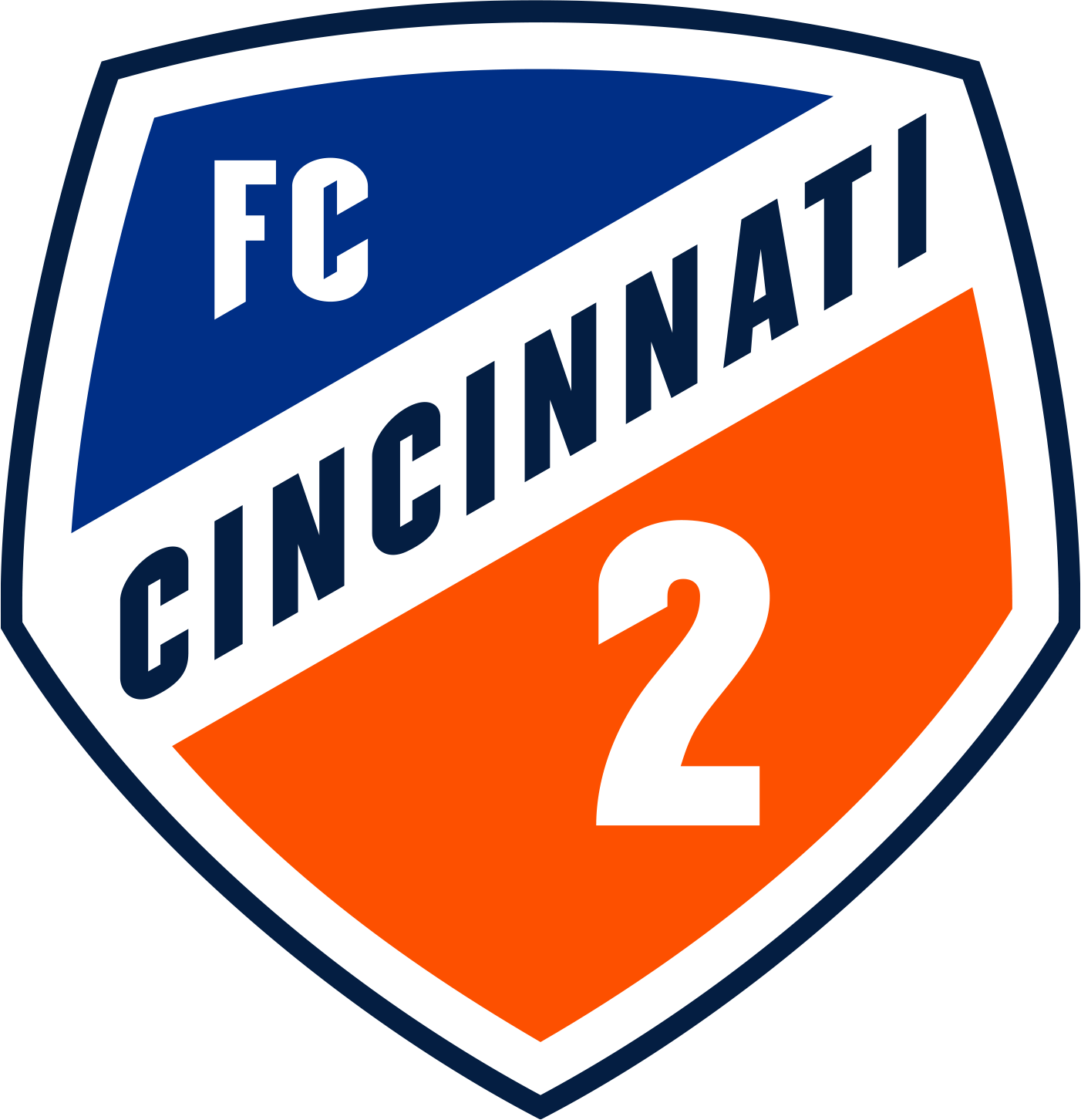
- Owner: Carl Lindner III
- Head coach: Tyrone Marshall
- Stadium: NKU Soccer Stadium; Mercy Health Training Center; TQL Stadium
- MLS Next Pro: Eastern Conference: TBD; Overall: TBD

The 2022 FC Cincinnati 2 season was the inaugural season of FC Cincinnati 2, the reserve team of Major League Soccer club FC Cincinnati. FC Cincinnati 2 competes in MLS Next Pro, a professional developmental league in the third tier of the United States soccer league system.

== Players and staff ==
=== Staff ===
- Tyrone Marshall – Head coach
- Ryan Coulter – Goalkeepers coach

== Competitions ==
=== MLS Next Pro ===
==== Standings ====
Eastern Conference

Pos	Div	Team	Pld	W	SOW	SOL	L	GF	GA	GD	Pts
6	CT	Inter Miami CF II	24	10	1	4	9	40	49	−9	36
7	NE	New England Revolution II	24	9	1	4	10	27	42	−15	33
8	CT	Chicago Fire FC II	24	8	2	3	11	41	44	−3	31
9	CT	Orlando City B	24	6	2	3	13	40	53	−13	25
10	CT	FC Cincinnati 2	24	4	2	1	17	27	65	−38	17

Source: MLSNP Eastern Conference
Rules for classification: 1) points; 2) total wins; 3) total goal differential; 4) total goals scored; 5) fewer disciplinary points; 6) away goal differential; 7) away goals scored; 8) home goals differential; 9) home goals scored; 10) coin toss (2 clubs tied) or drawing of lots (≥3 clubs tied)

Overall table

Pos	Team	Pld	W	SOW	SOL	L	GF	GA	GD	Pts
17	Colorado Rapids 2	24	7	4	2	11	33	56	−23	31
18	Orlando City B	24	6	2	3	13	40	53	−13	25
19	Real Monarchs	24	6	1	3	14	28	50	−22	23
20	FC Cincinnati 2	24	4	2	1	17	27	65	−38	17
21	Portland Timbers 2	24	2	4	0	18	29	66	−37	14

Source: MLSNP
Rules for classification: 1) points; 2) total wins; 3) total goal differential; 4) total goals scored; 5) fewer disciplinary points; 6) away goal differential; 7) away goals scored; 8) home goals differential; 9) home goals scored; 10) coin toss (2 clubs tied) or drawing of lots (≥3 clubs tied)

==== Results summary ====
Overall								Home						Away					
Pld	W	D	L	GF	GA	GD	Pts	W	D	L	GF	GA	GD	W	D	L	GF	GA	GD
24	4	3	17	27	65	−38	15	2	2	8	11	24	−13	2	1	9	16	41	−25

Last updated: September 18, 2022.
Source: MLS Next Pro

Per MLS Next Pro rules, 1 point is added for any penalty shootout won after a draw.

==== Results ====
Matchday	1	2	3	4	5	6	7	8	9	10	11	12	13	14	15	16	17	18	19	20	21	22	23	24
Stadium	A	H	A	H	A	H	A	H	A	H	A	H	A	H	A	A	H	H	H	A	A	H	H	A
Result	L	W	L	L	L	L	L	L	W	W	L	L	L	L	L	W	D	L	SW	L	SW	L	L	L

W = Win; D = Draw; L = Loss; SL = Shootout Loss; SW = Shootout Win

March 27 1	Philadelphia Union 2	2–0	FC Cincinnati 2	Chester, Pennsylvania
	Paternina 4'; Bueno 58'	Report		Stadium: Subaru Park; Referee: Thomas Snyder

April 3 2	FC Cincinnati 2	2–1	Toronto FC II	Highland Heights, Kentucky
	Ordonez 4'; Cela 73' (o.g.)	Report	Antonoglou 10'	Stadium: NKU Soccer Stadium; Referee: Luis Arroyo

April 17 3	New England Revolution II	3–2	FC Cincinnati 2	Foxborough, Massachusetts
	Panayotou 58', 90+2'; Lima 67'	Report	Ordonez 14'; Flanagan 22'	Stadium: Gillette Stadium; Referee: Ernie Constantine

April 23 4	FC Cincinnati 2	0–1	Inter Miami CF II	Highland Heights, Kentucky
	Flanagan (penalty missed) 22'; Noverr (yellow card) 28'	Report	Bagley 39'; Hundal (yellow card) 44'; Borgelin (yellow card) 45+1'; Caputo (yellow card) 55'; Reyes (yellow card) 85'	Stadium: NKU Soccer Stadium; Referee: Sergii Demianchuk

April 30 5	Toronto FC II	4–2	FC Cincinnati 2	Toronto, Canada
	Rothrock 50'; Walkes 66'; Altobelli 74'; Marshall 90+5' (o.g.)	Report	Valenzuela 12'; Ruszel 47'	Stadium: BMO Field; Referee: Mario Alayass

May 8 6	FC Cincinnati 2	1–2	Rochester New York FC	Highland Heights, Kentucky
	Flanagan 87'	Report	Dolabella 42'; Vanacker 85'	Stadium: NKU Soccer Stadium; Referee: Nabil Bensalah

May 15 7	Chicago Fire FC II	3–1	FC Cincinnati 2	Bridgeview, Illinois
	Glasgow 28'; Bezerra 57'; Monis 85'	Report	Akindele 29'	Stadium: SeatGeek Stadium; Referee: Calin Radosav

May 22 8	FC Cincinnati 2	0–1	New England Revolution II	Highland Heights, Kentucky
	Marshall (yellow card) 16'; Robledo (yellow card) 18'; Ordonez (yellow card) 90+2'	Report	Dias 53'; Rozhansky (yellow card) 59'; O'Hearn (yellow card) 90+5'	Stadium: NKU Soccer Stadium; Referee: Elvis Osmanovic

May 29 9	Orlando City B	3–5	FC Cincinnati 2	Kissimmee, Florida
	Tablante 14'; Lynn 24', 64' (pen.)	Report	Markanich 23', 43'; Hackenberg 48' (o.g.); Flanagan 79'; Akindele 85'	Stadium: Osceola Heritage Park; Referee: Amiel Aleman

June 11 10	FC Cincinnati 2	1–0	Rochester New York FC	Highland Heights, Kentucky
8:00 PM EDT	Markanich 90'	Report		Stadium: NKU Soccer Stadium; Referee: Christian Centeno

June 19 11	Inter Miami CF II	4–0	FC Cincinnati 2	Fort Lauderdale, Florida
	Hundal 15'; Cremaschi 40'; Boatwright 68'; Borgelin 82'	Report		Stadium: DRV PNK Stadium; Referee: Kyle Johnston

June 25 12	FC Cincinnati 2	1–3	Orlando City B	Highland Heights, Kentucky
	Cruz 35'; Kann (yellow card) 58'; Ramathan (yellow card) 60'; Markanich (yellow card) 65'	Report	Lynn 22'; Hackenberg (yellow card) 29'; Bravo 30'; Forth (yellow card) 76'; Tablante 85'; Pareja (yellow card) 90+5'	Stadium: NKU Soccer Stadium; Referee: Laura Waliski

July 2 13	New York City FC II	5–1	FC Cincinnati 2	New York, New York
7:00 PM EDT	Denis 3', 4'; Elias 16'; Jimenez 18'; Gómez 71'	Report	Akindele 56'	Stadium: Belson Stadium; Referee: Kenneth Rojas

July 10 14	FC Cincinnati 2	0–3	Chicago Fire FC II	Highland Heights, Kentucky
		Report	Fleming 27'; Casas 36'; Penn 64'	Stadium: NKU Soccer Stadium; Referee: Luis Arroyo

July 16 15	Columbus Crew 2	4–0	FC Cincinnati 2	Columbus, Ohio
7:00 PM EDT	Strachan 25'; Micaletto (yellow card) 26', (goal) 79'; Russell-Rowe 40', 82'; Mohamed (yellow card) 43'	Report	Daley (yellow card) 41'; Akindele (yellow card) 52' (yellow-red card) 72'	Stadium: Historic Crew Stadium; Referee: Seun Yinka-Kehinde

July 22 16	Rochester New York FC	0–2	FC Cincinnati 2	Brighton, New York
	Akanyirige (yellow card) 16'; Popp (yellow card) 57'; Soares (yellow card) 76'; Batista (yellow card) 90'	Report	Thomas (yellow card) 39'; Atanga 44'; Bailey (yellow card) 52'; Sunderland (yellow card) 80'; Daley 84'; Samways (yellow card) 90+3'	Stadium: John L. DiMarco Field; Referee: Shawn Tehini

July 31 17	FC Cincinnati 2	1–1 (3–4 SO)	Inter Miami CF II	Milford, Ohio
	Robledo 1', (yellow card) 77'	Report	Ruiz (yellow card) 37'; Quinteros (yellow card) 39'; Reyes (yellow card) 52', (goal) 61'; Beckham (yellow card) 71'; Sunderland (yellow card) 90+1'	Stadium: Mercy Health Training Center; Referee: Drew Klemp
	Shootout
	Valenzuela (penalty scored); Robledo (penalty scored); Akindele (penalty scored); Flanagan (penalty missed); Garcia (penalty missed)		Sunderland (penalty missed); Beckham (penalty scored); Allen (penalty scored); Destin (penalty scored); Caputo (penalty scored)

August 7 18	FC Cincinnati 2	2–3	Philadelphia Union 2	Milford, Ohio
	Ordonez 54'; Thomas 85'	Report	Bueno 24', 57'; Donovan 51'	Stadium: Mercy Health Training Center; Referee: Nabil Bensalah

August 14 19	FC Cincinnati 2	3–3 (4–2 SO)	Columbus Crew 2	Cincinnati, Ohio
	Ordonez 74'; Harris 66', (penalty scored) 90+6'	Report	Micaletto 16'; Parente 45+4', (penalty scored) 90+2'	Stadium: TQL Stadium; Referee: Marcelo Soto
	Shootout
	Valenzuela (penalty scored); Robledo (penalty scored); Ordonez (penalty scored); Harris (penalty scored)		Mohamed (penalty scored); Mbumba (penalty missed); Morris (penalty missed); Parente (penalty scored)

August 21 20	Toronto FC II	2–1	FC Cincinnati 2	Toronto, Canada
	Rothrock 2'; Díaz 84'	Report	Penagos 79'	Stadium: York Lions Stadium; Referee: Jérémie Blanchette

August 29 21	Orlando City B	2–2 (6–7 SO)	FC Cincinnati 2	Kissimmee, Florida
7:00pm	Loyola 14', 60'; Yan (yellow card) 25'; Pareja (yellow card) 33'; Freeman (yellow card) 40'; Forth (yellow card) 75'	Report	Musa (yellow card) 38'; Harris 54'; Markanich 56'	Stadium: Osceola Heritage Park; Referee: Luis Arroyo
	Shootout
	Loyola (penalty scored); Williams (penalty scored); Hackenberg (penalty scored); Prebenda (penalty scored); Granados (penalty scored); Otero (penalty scored); Forth (penalty missed)		(penalty scored) Harris; (penalty scored) Musa; (penalty scored) Marshall; (penalty scored) Turcios; (penalty scored) Daley; (penalty scored) Thomas; (penalty scored) Bailey

September 11 22	FC Cincinnati 2	0–2	Chicago Fire FC II	Milford, Ohio
5:00 PM EDT	Thomas (yellow card) 24'; Sánchez (yellow card) 77'	Report	M. Rodríguez 63' (pen.); Glasgow 51'	Stadium: Mercy Health Training Center; Referee: Amin Hadzic

September 14 23	FC Cincinnati 2	0–4	New York City FC II	Milford, Ohio
3:30 PM EDT	Valenzuela (yellow card) 23'	Report	Jimenez 19', 24'; Gómez 45'; Turnbull (yellow card) 61'; Owusu 69'	Stadium: Mercy Health Training Center; Referee: Youssef Elmessoussi

September 18 24	Columbus Crew 2	9–0	FC Cincinnati 2	Columbus, Ohio
	Fuson 28'; Russell-Rowe 42', 60', 87', 89'; Parente 45'; Gannon 58'; Strachan (yellow card) 67'; Farsi 72', 85'; Zawadzki (yellow card) 83'	Report	Marshall (yellow card) 13'; Garcia (red card) 20'; Valenzuela (yellow card) 65'; Penagos (yellow card) 75'; Sánchez (yellow card) 84'	Stadium: Historic Crew Stadium; Referee: Alex Beehler

== See also ==
- 2022 FC Cincinnati season
