= 2022 Chicago Fire FC II season =

Chicago Fire FC II
2022 season
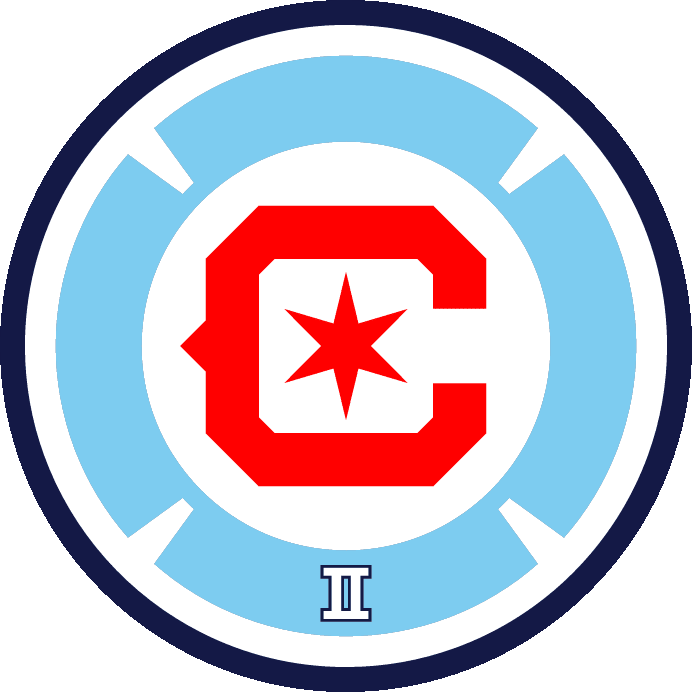
- Owner: Joe Mansueto
- Head coach: Ludovic Taillandier
- Stadium: SeatGeek Stadium
- MLS Next Pro: Eastern Conference: TBD; Overall: TBD
- U.S. Open Cup: Not eligible (MLS reserve team)
- Biggest win: CHI 5–0 NYCFC (8/20)
- Biggest defeat: CHI 0–5 STL (6/11)

The 2022 Chicago Fire FC II season was the club's inaugural season, and their 1st season competing in MLS Next Pro, a professional developmental league in the third tier of the United States Soccer pyramid.

== Players and staff ==
=== Roster ===
NOTE: First team players listed here have played in at least one game for the team.

No.	Pos.	Nation	Player
2	DF	USA	Kyle Bebej
8	DF	USA	Jedidiah McCloud
9	FW	NGR	Chinonso Offor
10	MF	USA	Gilberto Angeles
14	FW	ECU	Jhon Espinoza
15	MF	USA	Bowen McCloud
23	DF	COL	Carlos Terán
24	GK	USA	Aaron Katsimpalis
25	GK	USA	Ethan Turner
26	FW	COL	Jhon Durán
27	DF	USA	Kendall Burks
32	FW	USA	Missael Rodriguez
33	FW	USA	Victor Bezerra
34	GK	USA	Chris Brady
35	MF	USA	Sergio Oregel
36	DF	USA	Andre Reynolds II
37	MF	USA	Javier Casas, Jr.
38	FW	USA	Alex Monis
39	MF	USA	Allan Rodriguez
41	GK	SRB	Mihajlo Mišković
42	DF	USA	Ryan Quintos
43	MF	USA	Justin Reynolds
44	FW	USA	Noeh Hernandez
45	FW	USA	Maximiliano Viera
46	MF	USA	Matteo Kidd
47	FW	USA	Josh Penn
48	DF	USA	Charlie Ostrem
49	FW	USA	Erik Kocs-Washburn
50	DF	USA	Carlo Ritaccio
51	DF	USA	Michael Flores
52	MF	USA	Richard Fleming III
53	FW	USA	Luke Bezerra
54	DF	USA	Christian Baumgartner
55	FW	GUY	Omari Glasgow
56	DF	USA	Diegoarmando Alvardo
60	GK	USA	Adrian Giron

Chicago Fire MLS roster player
Chicago Fire academy player

=== Staff ===
- Ludovic Taillandier – Head Coach
- Patrick Nyarko – Assistant Coach

== Competitions ==
=== MLS NEXT Pro ===
==== Standings ====
Pos	Team	Pld	W	SOW	SOL	L	GF	GA	GD	Pts	Qualification
1	Columbus Crew 2	24	16	2	3	3	62	22	+40	55	Regular season champion
2	St. Louis City 2	24	15	1	2	6	51	34	+17	49	
3	Tacoma Defiance	24	14	3	1	6	57	25	+32	49	
4	Houston Dynamo 2	24	14	2	3	5	38	22	+16	49	
5	North Texas SC	24	13	2	3	6	48	31	+17	46	
6	San Jose Earthquakes II	24	12	1	3	8	48	37	+11	41	
7	Toronto FC II	24	12	2	1	9	44	38	+6	41	
8	Philadelphia Union II	24	11	3	1	9	42	39	+3	40	
9	Rochester New York FC	24	10	4	2	8	37	30	+7	40	
10	New York City FC II	24	9	4	2	9	49	35	+14	37	
11	Inter Miami CF II	24	10	1	4	9	40	49	−9	36	
12	Minnesota United FC 2	24	9	4	1	10	43	39	+4	36	
13	New England Revolution II	24	9	1	4	10	27	42	−15	33	
14	Whitecaps FC 2	24	7	3	5	9	40	40	0	32	
15	Sporting Kansas City II	24	9	1	2	12	31	38	−7	31	
16	Chicago Fire FC II	24	8	2	3	11	41	44	−3	31	
17	Colorado Rapids 2	24	7	4	2	11	33	56	−23	31	
18	Orlando City B	24	6	2	3	13	40	53	−13	25	
19	Real Monarchs	24	6	1	3	14	28	50	−22	23	
20	FC Cincinnati 2	24	4	2	1	17	27	65	−38	17	
21	Portland Timbers 2	24	2	4	0	18	29	66	−37	14	

Source: MLSNP
Rules for classification: 1) points; 2) total wins; 3) total goal differential; 4) total goals scored; 5) fewer disciplinary points; 6) away goal differential; 7) away goals scored; 8) home goals differential; 9) home goals scored; 10) coin toss (2 clubs tied) or drawing of lots (≥3 clubs tied)

==== Results summary ====
Overall								Home						Away					
Pld	W	D	L	GF	GA	GD	Pts	W	D	L	GF	GA	GD	W	D	L	GF	GA	GD
24	8	5	11	41	44	−3	29	5	3	4	23	22	+1	3	2	7	18	22	−4

Last updated: September 18, 2022.
Source: MLS Next Pro

Per MLS Next Pro rules, 1 point is added for any penalty shootout won after a draw.

==== Regular season ====
March 26 1	Orlando City B	2–0	Chicago Fire II	Kissimmee, Florida
2:00 PM CST	(yellow card) 30, 63' (yellow-red card) Gunera-Calix; 50', 87' Lynn	Report	(yellow card) 16' Ostrem; (red card) 37' J. Reynolds; (yellow card) 56' Espinoza	Stadium: Osceola County Stadium; Referee: Gabriele Giusti

April 3 2	Chicago Fire II	0–1	Columbus Crew 2	Bridgeview, Illinois
6:00 PM CST	(yellow card) 51' A. Reynolds	Report	72' Fusion; (yellow card) 88' Elliot; (yellow card) 90+3' Kamara	Stadium: SeatGeek Stadium; Referee: Calin Radosav

April 10 3	Chicago Fire II	0–0 (5–6 SO)	Rochester New York FC	Bridgeview, Illinois
2:30 PM CST	(yellow card) 20' Alex Monis	Report	(yellow card) 77' Popp; (yellow card) 78' Smith	Stadium: SeatGeek Stadium; Referee: Nabil Bensalah
	Shootout
	(penalty scored) Bezerra; (penalty scored) Penn; (penalty scored) Casas; (penalty missed) Durán; (penalty scored) M. Rodriguez; (penalty scored) Ostrem; (penalty missed) Burks		(penalty scored) Dolabella; (penalty scored) Rissi; (penalty missed) Djaló; (penalty scored) Garrett; (penalty scored) Popp; (penalty scored) Drai; (penalty scored) Rayo

April 17 4	Toronto FC II	4–2	Chicago Fire II	Toronto, Ontario
1 PM CST	21' Franklin; (yellow card) 65' Mbongue; 66' Rothrock; 71' Greenidge-Duncan; 88' Díaz; (yellow card) 89' Coello; (yellow card) 90+4' Ranjitsingh; (yellow card) 90+5' Goulborne	Report	5' Monis; 59' L. Bezerra	Stadium: York Lions Stadium; Referee: Marie-Soleil Beaudoin

April 24 5	Chicago Fire II	3–3 (5–4 SO)	Philadelphia Union II	Bridgeview, Illinois
CST	(yellow card) 6' M. Rodriguez; 17' (pen.) (yellow card) 52' (yellow-red card) 56' Bezerra; Chinonso Offor 37', 90+1'	Report	(yellow card) 45+1' Diallo; 51' (pen.) Turner; 57', 72' Donovan; (red card) 70' Jasinski	Stadium: SeatGeek Stadium; Referee: Laura Rodriguez
	Shootout
	(penalty scored) Offor; (penalty scored) Monis; (penalty scored) Penn; (penalty scored) Kidd; (penalty scored) Quintos		(penalty scored) Craig; (penalty missed) Gilman; (penalty scored) Stojanovic; (penalty scored) Donovan; (penalty scored) Turner

May 8 6	Chicago Fire II	0–0 (6–7 SO)	Minnesota United FC 2	Bridgeview, Illinois
CST	Kidd (yellow card) 16'; J. Reynolds (yellow card) 29' (yellow-red card) 38'; M. Rodriguez (yellow card) 49'	Report	Kibunguchy (yellow card) 17' (yellow-red card) 44'	Stadium: SeatGeek Stadium; Referee: Abdou Ndiaye
	Shootout
	Espinoza (penalty scored); Ritaccio (penalty scored); Glasgow (penalty scored); Flores (penalty missed); Oregel (penalty scored); Fleming (penalty scored); M. Rodriguez (penalty scored); D. Alvarado (penalty missed)		(penalty scored) Pacheco; (penalty scored) Ramos; (penalty scored) Oluwaseyi; (penalty scored) Jackson; (penalty missed) Mendonca; (penalty scored) Iwe; (penalty scored) Gutiérrez; (penalty scored) Padelford

May 15 7	Chicago Fire II	3–1	FC Cincinnati 2	Bridgeview, Illinois
CST	Glasgow 28'; Bezerra 57'; Monis 85'	Report	Akindele 29'	Stadium: SeatGeek Stadium; Referee: Calin Radosav

May 21 8	New York City FC II	3–0	Chicago Fire II	New York City, New York
CST	Haak 54'; Murania Yankowitz 78' (pen.); Youssoufi 82'	Report		Stadium: Belson Stadium; Referee: Greg Dopka

May 27 9	Toronto FC II	2–6	Chicago Fire II	Toronto, Ontario
CST	Mbongue 87'; Antonoglou 90+1'	Report	Penn 12', 20', 34'; Glasgow 54'; Kocs-Washburn 68'; M. Rodriguez 72'	Stadium: York Lions Stadium; Referee: Renzo Villanueva

June 4 10	Chicago Fire II	2–4	Columbus Crew 2	Bridgeview, Illinois
7:00 PM CDT	Monis 11'; Penn 20'	Report	Micaletto 47'; Fuson 68'; Telfer 78'; Russell-Rowe 81'	Stadium: SeatGeek Stadium; Referee: Erin Patterson

June 11 11	Chicago Fire II	0–5	St. Louis City SC 2	Bridgeview, Illinois
CST		Report	Rivas 9'; Palazzolo 20'; Dolling 51'; Célio Pompeu 83'; Di Rosa 88'	Stadium: SeatGeek Stadium; Referee: Nickrod Fateh

June 19 12	Philadelphia Union II	1–1 (3–0 SO)	Chicago Fire II	Chester, Pennsylvania
1:00 PM CDT	Pierre 29'	Report	Glasgow 49'	Stadium: Subaru Park; Referee: Jeremy Scheer
	Shootout
	Real (penalty scored); Sorenson (penalty scored); Donovan (penalty scored)		Bezerra (penalty missed); Ostrem (penalty missed); Ritaccio (penalty missed)

June 26 13	Chicago Fire II	4–3	New England Revolution II	Bridgeview, Illinois
CST	Monis 13'; Bezerra 17', 76'; Quintos (yellow card) 20', (goal) 55'; Ritaccio (yellow card) 80'	Report	DeShields (yellow card) 3'; Dos Santos (yellow card) 31'; Lima 33', (yellow card) 43'; Cayet 36'; Michel 90+3'	Stadium: SeatGeek Stadium; Referee: Esad Omanovic

July 2 14	Inter Miami II	3–1	Chicago Fire II	Ft. Lauderdale, Florida
6:00 PM CDT	Hundal 13'; Sunderland 17'; Borgelin 78'	Report	M. Rodriguez 8'	Stadium: DRV PNK Stadium; Referee: Benjamin Meyer

July 10 15	FC Cincinnati 2	0–3	Chicago Fire II	Highland Heights, Kentucky
		Report	Fleming 27'; Casas 36'; Penn 64'	Stadium: NKU Soccer Stadium; Referee: Luis Arroyo

July 17 16	Chicago Fire II	3–4	Orlando City B	Bridgeview, Illinois
6:00 PM CDT	Bezerra 35', 39', 49'	Report	Lynn 19'; Loyola 70', 83'; Acosta 90'	Stadium: SeatGeek Stadium; Referee: Rebeca Pagan

July 30 17	Rochester New York FC	1–1 (4–5 SO)	Chicago Fire II	Brighton, New York
6:00 PM CDT	Garrett (yellow card) 57'; Rayo (yellow card) 68', (goal) 70'	Report	Ostrem (yellow card) 54'; M. Rodriguez 76'; Baumgartner (yellow card) 83'; Ritaccio (yellow card) 85'	Stadium: John L. DiMarco Field; Referee: Nickrod Fateh
	Shootout
	Rayo (penalty missed); Costa (penalty scored); Batiz (penalty scored); Inalien (penalty scored); Dolabella (penalty scored); Garrett (penalty missed)		Penn (penalty scored); Monis (penalty scored); Fleming (penalty scored); Kidd (penalty missed); M. Rodriguez (penalty scored); Quintos (penalty scored)

August 6 18	St. Louis City SC 2	2–1	Chicago Fire II	Edwardsville, Illinois
8:00 PM CDT	Schneider (yellow card) 45'; Pompeu (yellow card) 52'; Yaro 56'; Dolling 83'	Report	M. Rodriguez 35'; Ostrem (yellow card) 39'; J. Reynolds (yellow card) 54'; Oregel (yellow card) 55'; A. Rodriguez (yellow card) 56'	Stadium: Ralph Korte Stadium; Referee: Benjamin Meyer

August 14 19	New England Revolution II	1–0	Chicago Fire II	Foxborough, Massachusetts
CDT	Cayet 52'; Michel (yellow card) 72'; Zwetsloot (yellow card) 76'; Quiñones (yellow card) 79'; Weinstein (yellow card) 90+3'	Report	Penn (penalty missed) 12'; Burks (yellow card) 42'; Ritaccio (yellow card) 77'	Stadium: Gillette Stadium; Referee: Gary Gutierrez

August 20 20	Chicago Fire II	5–0	New York City FC II	Bridgeview, Illinois
7:00 PM CDT	Espinoza (yellow card) 7'; Quintos 16'; Oregel (yellow card) 22'; Bezerra 27'; Burks (yellow card) 45+1'; Penn 64', 67'; M. Rodriguez 71'	Report	Elias (yellow card) 34'	Stadium: SeatGeek Stadium; Referee: Becky Pagan

August 25 21	Chicago Fire II	2–1	Toronto FC II	Bridgeview, Illinois
7:00 PM CDT	Fleming 38'; M. Rodríguez 57'	Report	Yeates (penalty missed) 70', 70'	Stadium: SeatGeek Stadium; Referee: Youssef Elmessoussi

September 3 22	Columbus Crew 2	3–1	Chicago Fire II	Columbus, Ohio
7:30 PM CDT	Parente 26'; Russell-Rowe 38' (pen.); Fuson (yellow card) 42'; Telfer 76'; Mohamed (yellow card) 90+2'	Report	Brady (yellow card) 37'; M. Rodríguez (yellow card) 45'; Glasgow (yellow card) 45+1', (goal) 80'; Ostrem (yellow card) 54'	Stadium: Historic Crew Stadium; Referee: Danielle Chesky

September 11 23	FC Cincinnati 2	0–2	Chicago Fire II	Milford, Ohio
4:00 PM CDT	Thomas (yellow card) 24'; Sánchez (yellow card) 77'	Report	M. Rodríguez 63' (pen.); Glasgow 51'	Stadium: Mercy Health Training Center; Referee: Amin Hadzic

September 18 24	Chicago Fire II	1–0	Inter Miami II	Bridgeview, Illinois
2:00 PM CDT	Monis 14'; Flores (yellow card) 71'; Glasgow (yellow card) 90+2'	Report	Caputo (yellow card) 10'; Azcona (yellow card) 86'	Stadium: SeatGeek Stadium; Referee: Chris Ruska

== See also ==
- 2022 Chicago Fire FC season
