= List of Akron Zips in the MLS Draft =

The University of Akron men's soccer team has had 37 players drafted in Major League Soccer (MLS) as well as seven non-drafted players (most due to homegrown rights). Youth New Zealand international Cameron Knowles was the first Akron player to be drafted and play in MLS when he appeared for Real Salt Lake against the Los Angeles Galaxy on June 22, 2007. In the 2011 draft, the University of Akron made MLS history when five players were selected in the first round, including the second, third, fourth, seventh and eighth picks.

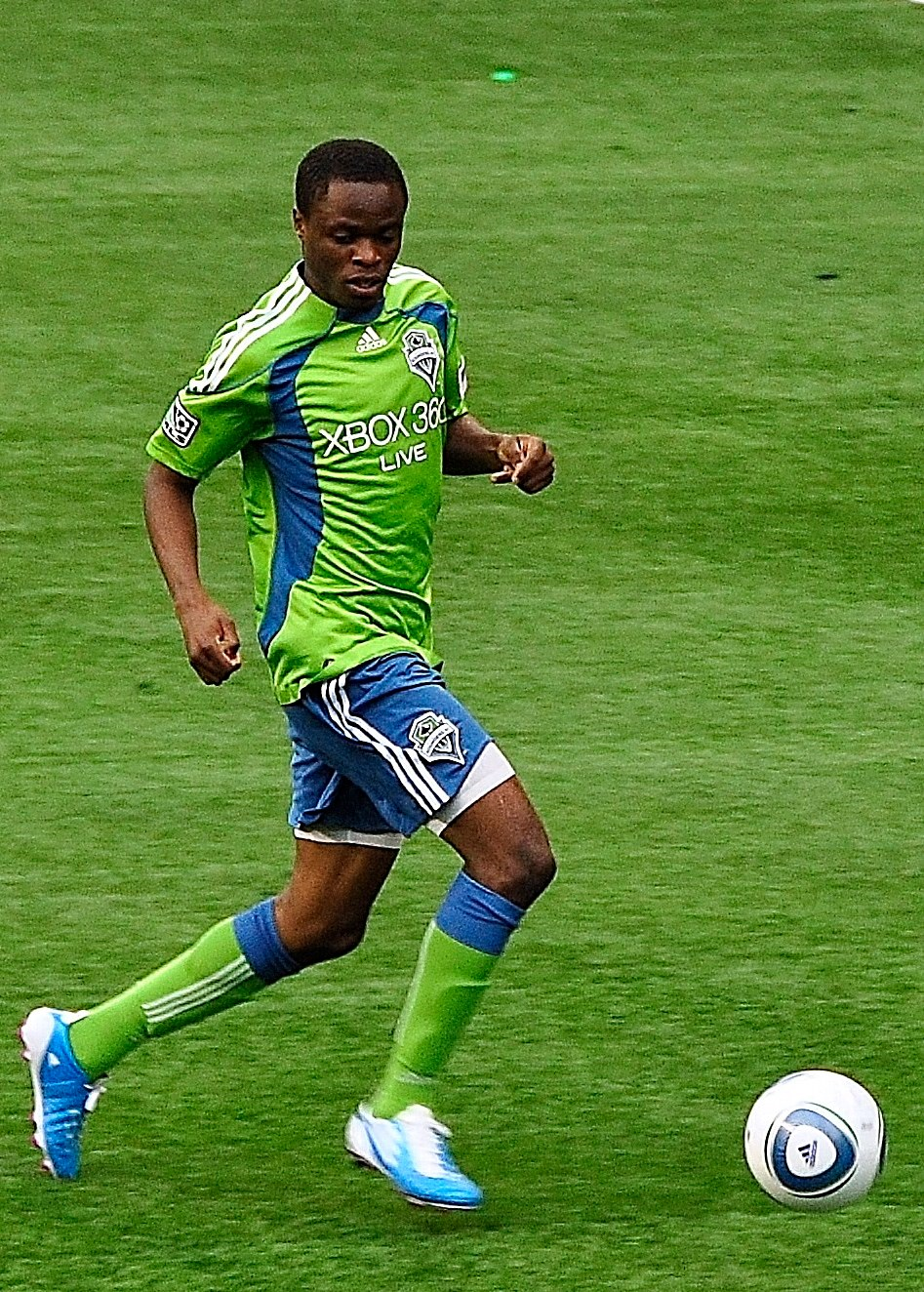
Steve Zakuani playing for the Seattle Sounders FC in 2010

Steve Zakuani made an appearance on the DR Congo national team, and Teal Bunbury, DeAndre Yedlin, Wil Trapp, Perry Kitchen, and Darlington Nagbe have all featured for the United States men's national team. Kofi Sarkodie and Zarek Valentin have played for the United States under-20 team while Jonathan Lewis, Blair Gavin and Anthony Ampaipitakwong have played for the under-20 and under-17 teams. Cameron Knowles was part of the New Zealand U-17 squad during the 1999 FIFA U-17 World Championship.

== Player selection ==
=== MLS draft ===
Year	Round	Pick	Overall	Player	Position	MLS team	Current team	Notes
2005	4	1	37	(New Zealand) Cameron Knowles	Defender	Real Salt Lake	Retired	
2007	3	7	33	(Bosnia and Herzegovina) Siniša Ubiparipović	Midfielder	New York Red Bulls	Retired	
2009	1	1	1	(Democratic Republic of the Congo) Steve Zakuani	Midfielder	Seattle Sounders FC	Retired	
2010	1	4	4	(United States) Teal Bunbury	Forward	Sporting Kansas City	New England Revolution	
2010	1	10	10	(United States) Blair Gavin	Midfielder	Chivas USA	Retired	
2010	3	16	47	(United States) Ben Zemanski	Midfielder	Chivas USA	Retired	
2011	1	2	2	(United States) Darlington Nagbe	Midfielder	Portland Timbers	Columbus Crew SC	
2011	1	3	3	(United States) Perry Kitchen	Midfielder	D.C. United	LA Galaxy	
2011	1	4	4	(United States) Zarek Valentin	Defender	Chivas USA	Houston Dynamo	
2011	1	7	7	(United States) Kofi Sarkodie	Defender	Houston Dynamo	Unattached	
2011	1	8	8	(United States) Michael Nanchoff	Midfielder	Vancouver Whitecaps FC	Retired	
2011	2	13	31	(United States) Chris Korb	Defender	D.C. United	Unattached	
2011	2	15	33	(Thailand) Anthony Ampaipitakwong	Midfielder	San Jose Earthquakes	(Thailand) Bangkok United	
2012	1	2	2	(Jamaica) Darren Mattocks	Forward	Vancouver Whitecaps FC	FC Cincinnati	
2013	3	3	41	(United States) David Meves	Goalkeeper	Portland Timbers	Unattached	
2014	2	8	27	(United States) Robbie Derschang	Defender	Philadelphia Union	Unattached	
2014	2	15	34	(United States) Eric Stevenson	Midfielder	New York Red Bulls	Retired	
2014	3	14	52	(United States) Aodhan Quinn	Midfielder	Philadelphia Union	Orange County SC	
2014	4	19	76	(Costa Rica) Reinaldo Brenes	Forward	Sporting Kansas City	Unattached	
2015	1	12	12	(United States) Saad Abdul-Salaam	Defender	Sporting Kansas City	FC Cincinnati	
2016	1	7	7	(Canada) Richie Laryea	Midfielder	Orlando City SC	(Canada) Toronto FC	
2017	1	3	3	(United States) Jonathan Lewis	Forward	New York City FC	Colorado Rapids	
2017	2	14	36	(United States) Danilo Radjen	Defender	Houston Dynamo	Unattached	
2018	1	1	1	(Portugal) João Moutinho	Defender	Los Angeles FC	Orlando City SC	
2018	2	8	31	(Philippines) Niko De Vera	Defender	New York Red Bulls	Portland Timbers 2	
2018	3	2	48	(United States) Nate Shultz	Defender	LA Galaxy	Unattached	
2018	3	18	64	(New Zealand) Stuart Holthusen	Forward	Portland Timbers	Unattached	
2019	2	13	37	(Germany) Ben Lundt	Goalkeeper	FC Cincinnati	FC Cincinnati	
2019	2	19	43	(Somalia) Abdi Mohamed	Defender	New York City FC	New Mexico United	
2020	2	19	45	(Northern Ireland) Tom Smart	Defender	LA Galaxy	Unattached	
2021	1	9	9	(Nigeria) David Egbo	Forward	Vancouver Whitecaps FC	Unattached	
2022	2	10	38	(United States) Will Meyer	Goalkeeper	Nashville SC	Rhode Island FC	
2022	3	7	63	(United States) Carlo Ritaccio	Defender	Chicago Fire SC	Long Island Rough Riders	
2024	2	6	35	(United States) Jason Shokalook	Forward	Chicago Fire SC	Chicago Fire FC II	
2024	2	10	39	(Canada) Malik Henry	Midfielder	CF Montréal	Toronto FC II	
2024	2	22	51	(United States) Dyson Clapier	Midfielder	Sporting Kansas City	Orlando City B	
2025	1	7	7	(England) Emil Jääskeläinen	Forward	St. Louis City SC	St. Louis City SC 2	

=== Non-draft MLS players ===
Date	Player	Position	MLS team	Current team	Notes
October 21, 2011	(United States) Evan Bush	Goalkeeper	Montreal Impact	(Canada) Columbus Crew SC	Signed for 2012 season
December 13, 2012	(United States) Wil Trapp	Midfielder	Columbus Crew SC	Inter Miami CF	Signed as Homegrown Player
January 10, 2013	(United States) Chad Barson	Defender	Columbus Crew SC	Retired	Signed as Homegrown Player
January 11, 2013	(United States) DeAndre Yedlin	Defender	Seattle Sounders FC	(England) Newcastle United F.C.	Signed as Homegrown Player
January 18, 2013	(United States) Dillon Serna	Midfielder	Colorado Rapids	Colorado Rapids	Signed as Homegrown Player
January 21, 2013	(United States) Scott Caldwell	Midfielder	New England Revolution	New England Revolution	Signed as Homegrown Player
February 8, 2017	(Afghanistan) Adam Najem	Midfielder	New York Red Bulls	Memphis 901 FC	Traded Red Bulls Homegrown Rights to Philadelphia Union
