= Andrei Chirilă =

American soccer player (born 2008)

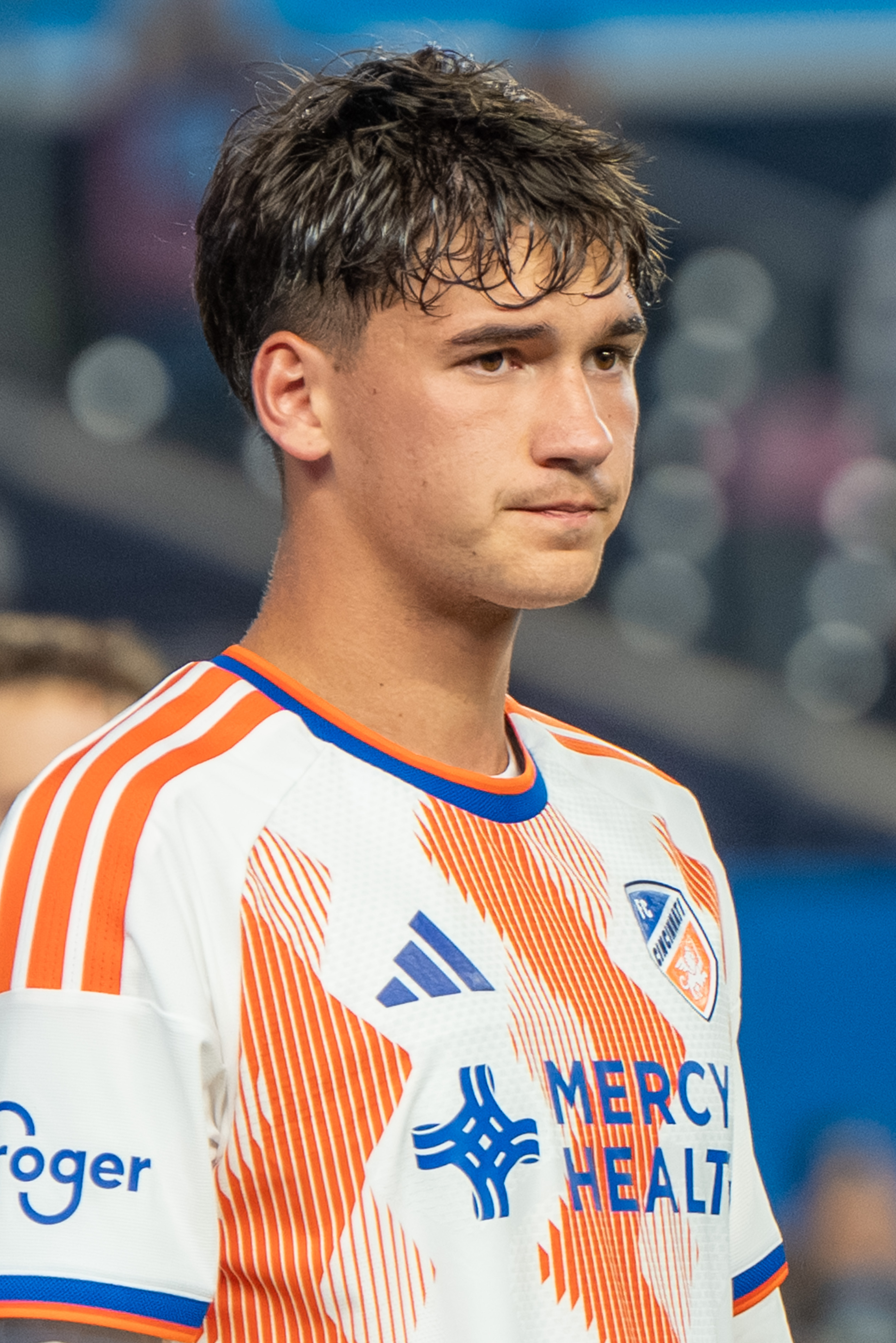
- Chirilă with FC Cincinnati in 2026

Personal information
- Full name: Andrei Chirilă
- Date of birth: August 15, 2008 (age 18)
- Place of birth: Allentown, Pennsylvania, United States
- Height: 6 ft 3 in (1.91 m)
- Position: Centre-back

Team information
- Current team: FC Cincinnati
- Number: 88

Youth career
- Philadelphia Union
- FC Cincinnati

Senior career*
Years	Team	Apps	(Gls)
2024–	FC Cincinnati 2	36	(2)
2026–	FC Cincinnati	8	(1)

International career
2026	United States U18	1	(0)
- * Club domestic league appearances and goals as of 11:46, September 6, 2026 (UTC)

Andrei Chirilă (born August 15, 2008), is an American professional soccer player who plays as a central defender for FC Cincinnati in Major League Soccer (MLS). A product of the FC Cincinnati Academy, he signed a Homegrown Player contract with the club on April 2, 2026, becoming the youngest player in FC Cincinnati history to start an MLS match.

== Early life ==
Chirila was born in Allentown, Pennsylvania, and grew up in the Cincinnati area. He is the younger brother of Ștefan Chirilă, a forward who also plays for FC Cincinnati. His father introduced both brothers to soccer from a young age. Chirila holds both American and Romanian citizenship.

== Club career ==
=== FC Cincinnati Academy ===
Chirila came through the FC Cincinnati Academy, emerging as one of the club's most promising young defenders. In the summer of 2025, he was selected to the 2025 MLS NEXT All-Star Game, representing the East alongside fellow FC Cincinnati Academy product Ademar Chávez.

=== FC Cincinnati 2 ===
Chirila signed with FC Cincinnati 2 in the MLS NEXT Pro ahead of the 2025 season. He made his MLS NEXT Pro debut on March 9, 2025, starting and playing the full 90 minutes against Toronto FC II. Across the 2025 MLS NEXT Pro season, he made 26 starts and logged 2,249 minutes, the second most of any FC Cincinnati 2 player, and scored one goal from the backline. He also helped FCC 2 qualify for the MLS NEXT Pro Playoffs. Across all appearances with FC Cincinnati 2, he tallied 2 goals and 1 assist in 31 appearances.

=== FC Cincinnati ===
Chirila was called up to the FC Cincinnati first team on a Short-Term Agreement and made his senior debut on February 18, 2026, starting and playing the full 90 minutes in a CONCACAF Champions Cup Round One, Leg One match against O&M FC, helping the club to a 4–0 clean sheet victory. He started the return leg on February 25, again playing 90 minutes. On March 15, 2026, Chirila made his MLS debut, starting and playing 90 minutes at New England Revolution, becoming the youngest player in FC Cincinnati history to start an MLS match.

On April 2, 2026, FC Cincinnati signed Chirila as a Homegrown Player on a contract through the 2028–29 MLS season, with a club option through 2029–30. He became the third player in club history, following his brother Stefan Chirila and Ademar Chávez, to progress from the FC Cincinnati Academy to an MLS NEXT Pro contract with FC Cincinnati 2 and then to a first-team MLS contract. He is the tenth former FC Cincinnati Academy product to sign a first-team contract with the club, and the ninth as a Homegrown Player.

== International career ==
Chirila has represented the United States at the U-18 level, earning two call-ups to the U18 Men's National Team in 2026. In the March 2026 FIFA International Window, he participated in the 2026 Torneio Internacional de Lisboa, starting in a 2–1 win over Iceland and a 1–1 draw against Portugal.

== Personal life ==
Chirila and his older brother Ștefan Chirilă became the first pair of brothers to play for FC Cincinnati, and the first family duo to progress through the FC Cincinnati system in its entirety to reach the first team. Chirila wears the number 88 shirt, while his brother Stefan chose to wear his kit with the name "S. Chirila" to distinguish the two.

== Honors ==
Individual

- MLS NEXT All-Star Game selection: 2025
