= Preston Popp =

Canadian soccer player (born 1999)

Personal information
- Date of birth: December 8, 1999 (age 26)
- Place of birth: Montreal, Quebec, Canada
- Height: 5 ft 10 in (1.78 m)
- Position: Forward

Team information
- Current team: Des Moines Menace
- Number: 9

Youth career
- CS Dollard
- Charlotte Soccer Academy
- North Carolina FC
- 2017: New York Red Bulls
- 2017–2018: Toronto FC

College career
Years	Team	Apps	(Gls)
2018–2021	Charlotte 49ers	67	(22)

Senior career*
Years	Team	Apps	(Gls)
2019	North Carolina FC U23	6	(1)
2022	Rochester New York FC	8	(0)
2022	→ FC Cincinnati 2 (loan)	1	(0)
2023	North Carolina FC	15	(1)
2024–	Des Moines Menace	3	(2)
- * Club domestic league appearances and goals as of June 11, 2024

Preston Popp (born December 8, 1999) is a Canadian soccer player who plays as a forward for the Des Moines Menace in USL League Two.

== Early life ==
Born in Montreal, Popp is the son of Jim Popp, who was the general manager of the Canadian Football League team Montreal Alouettes at the time. He began playing youth soccer with CS Dollard, before moving to Mooresville, North Carolina at age ten. He played youth soccer with the Charlotte Soccer Academy and North Carolina FC. He then played with the New York Red Bulls Academy and the Toronto FC Academy.

== College career ==
In 2018, he began attending the University of North Carolina at Charlotte, where he played for the men's soccer team. He scored his first goal on September 11, 2018, against the Elon Phoenix. In his freshman season, he was named to the Conference USA All-Freshman Team and the Conference USA All-Tournament Team. In his junior season, he was the Co-Golden Boot winner and was named to the Conference USA Second Team, and was also a Second Team Scholar All-American, United Soccer Coaches All-Southeast Region, and Scholar All-Region. He was also named to the College Sports Information Directors of America All-District III First Team. In his senior season in 2021, he once again won the Conference USA Golden Boot, All-Region honours, and was named to the Conference USA First Team.

== Club career ==
In 2019, he played with North Carolina FC U23 in USL League Two, despite originally being set to join Reading United AC. He was named to the USL2 Team of the Week, after scoring his first goal on June 7 against Lionsbridge FC, scoring in stoppage time to give his team a 2–1 victory.

After not being selected in the 2022 MLS SuperDraft, he signed a contract with MLS Next Pro side Rochester New York FC. On May 1, he joined FC Cincinnati 2 on a short-term loan for their match against Toronto FC II, as Cincinnati was experiencing a roster shortage. In November 2022, Rochester announced Popp would be departing the club.

In December 2022, Popp signed a professional contract with USL League One club North Carolina FC for the 2023 season, re-joining his former youth club. He won the league title with the club that season, although he played sparingly with only 170 total minutes in 15 appearances.

== Career statistics ==
As of June 11, 2024

Appearances and goals by club, season and competition
Club	Season	League			Playoffs		National Cup		Other		Total	
Club	Season	Division	Apps	Goals	Apps	Goals	Apps	Goals	Apps	Goals	Apps	Goals
North Carolina FC U23	2019	USL League Two	6	1	—		—		—		6	1
Rochester New York	2022	MLS Next Pro	8	0	0	0	2	0	—		10	0
FC Cincinnati 2 (loan)	2022	MLS Next Pro	1	0	—		—		—		1	0
North Carolina FC	2023	USL League One	15	1	0	0	0	0	—		15	1
Des Moines Menace	2024	USL League Two	3	2	0	0	0	0	—		3	2
Career Total			33	4	0	0	2	0	0	0	35	4
