= Ștefan Chirilă =

Romanian footballer (born 2007)

Personal information
- Date of birth: 15 January 2007 (age 19)
- Place of birth: Allentown, Pennsylvania, United States
- Height: 1.85 m (6 ft 1 in)
- Position: Forward

Team information
- Current team: FC Cincinnati
- Number: 19

Youth career
- –2023: Philadelphia Union
- 2023–2024: FC Cincinnati

Senior career*
Years	Team	Apps	(Gls)
2024–	FC Cincinnati 2	66	(25)
2025–	FC Cincinnati	2	(0)

International career^{‡}
2024	United States U18	2	(0)
2024–2025	Romania U18	7	(0)
2025–	Romania U19	3	(0)
- * Club domestic league appearances and goals as of 20 September 2026 ‡ National team caps and goals as of 18 November 2025

Ștefan Chirilă (born 15 January 2007) is a professional footballer who plays as a forward for Major League Soccer club FC Cincinnati. Born in the United States, he represents Romania at youth international level.
