= Avionne Flanagan =

American soccer player (born 1999)

Personal information
- Date of birth: April 6, 1999 (age 27)
- Place of birth: Baltimore, Maryland, United States
- Height: 1.80 m (5 ft 11 in)
- Positions: Defender; midfielder

Youth career
- –2016: D.C. United
- 2016–2017: Baltimore Armour

College career
Years	Team	Apps	(Gls)
2017–2020	South Florida Bulls	48	(4)

Senior career*
Years	Team	Apps	(Gls)
2018	FC Baltimore Christos	8	(3)
2019	Treasure Coast Tritons	5	(2)
2021	FC Cincinnati	0	(0)
2021	→ Orange County SC (loan)	6	(0)
2021	→ FC Tulsa (loan)	6	(0)
2022	FC Cincinnati 2	18	(3)
2022–2023	Charleston Battery	10	(0)
2023	Charlotte Independence	34	(2)
2024	New Mexico United	24	(0)
- * Club domestic league appearances and goals as of October 28, 2024

Avionne Flanagan (born April 6, 1999) is an American professional soccer player who plays as a defender.

== Career ==
=== Youth ===
Flanagan played with D.C. United's academy until 2016, before spending a year with local club side Baltimore Armour.

=== College and semi-professional ===
In 2017, Flanagan attended the University of South Florida to play college soccer. He went on to make 48 appearances for the Bulls, scoring 4 goals and tallying 7 assists over three seasons. The American Athletic Conference season was cancelled in 2020 due to the COVID-19 pandemic. Flanagan earned First Team All-Conference honors in 2019 and was named to the American Athletic Conference All-Academic Team in both 2018 and 2019.

Whilst at college, Flanagan also played with NPSL side FC Baltimore Christos in 2018. He also played in the USL League Two with Treasure Coast Tritons in 2019.

=== Professional ===
On January 21, 2021, Flanagan was selected 29th overall in the 2021 MLS SuperDraft by FC Cincinnati. He officially signed with the Major League Soccer club on April 7, 2021.

On May 21, 2021, Flanagan was loaned to USL Championship side Orange County SC for the 2021 season. He made his first professional appearance the next day, appearing as an 82nd-minute substitute during a 1–0 win over Sacramento Republic.

Flanagan was loaned out again in September, joining FC Tulsa for the remainder of the 2021 USL Championship season.

Following the 2021 season, Cincinnati declined their contract option on Flanagan. On March 11, 2022, it was announced that Flanagan had signed with FC Cincinnati 2, the club's MLS Next Pro side, ahead of their inaugural season.

On August 12, 2022, Flanagan signed with USL Championship side Charleston Battery. One week into the 2023 season, he left Charleston to sign with USL League One side Charlotte Independence.

Following the 2023 season, Flanagan signed with New Mexico United for the 2024 USL Championship season.
