= Andrew Akindele =

American soccer player

Personal information
- Full name: Andrew Akindele
- Date of birth: January 11, 2000 (age 26)
- Place of birth: Chicago, Illinois, United States
- Height: 5 ft 11 in (1.80 m)
- Position: Forward

Youth career
- 2011–2018: Chicago Fire

College career
Years	Team	Apps	(Gls)
2018–2021	Wisconsin Badgers	56	(10)

Senior career*
Years	Team	Apps	(Gls)
2021	Chicago FC United	8	(7)
2022	FC Cincinnati 2	15	(3)
2023	South Georgia Tormenta	12	(0)
- * Club domestic league appearances and goals as of October 17, 2023

Andrew Akindele (born January 11, 2000) is an American soccer player who plays as a forward.

== Career ==
=== Youth and college ===
Akindele attended Jones College Prep High School and played in the USSDA from 2011 through 2018 with the Chicago Fire Academy.

in 2018, Akindele attended the University of Wisconsin–Madison to play college soccer. In four seasons with the Badgers, Akindele made 56 appearances, scoring ten goals and tallying eight assists. In 2018, he earned All-Big Ten freshman team honors.

Whilst at college, Akindele also appeared in the USL League Two, making eight appearances for Chicago FC United in their 2021 season.

=== Professional ===
Ahead of the inaugural MLS Next Pro season, Akindele signed with FC Cincinnati 2 on March 11, 2022. He scored three goals in 15 appearances for Cincinnati.

On March 15, 2023, Akindele signed with USL League One side South Georgia Tormenta. He made his debut for Tormenta on March 17, 2023, starting in a 1–0 win over North Carolina FC.
