= Carlo Ritaccio =

American soccer player (born 2000)

Personal information
- Date of birth: January 9, 2000 (age 26)
- Place of birth: Westbury, New York, United States
- Height: 1.85 m (6 ft 1 in)
- Position: Defender

Youth career
- 2007–2013: BW Gottschee
- 2013–2016: IMG Academy
- 2016–2018: BW Gottschee

College career
Years	Team	Apps	(Gls)
2018–2021	Akron Zips	58	(7)

Senior career*
Years	Team	Apps	(Gls)
2019	New York Red Bulls U23	3	(0)
2019–2021	Long Island Rough Riders	8	(0)
2022	Chicago Fire II	19	(0)

International career^{‡}
2016	United States U17	2	(0)
2018	United States U19	2	(0)
- * Club domestic league appearances and goals as of October 4, 2022 ‡ National team caps and goals as of October 4, 2022

Carlo Ritaccio (born January 9, 2000) is an American soccer player who plays as a defender.

== Career ==
=== Youth ===
Ritaccio began playing club soccer at local side BW Gottschee, before getting recruited to play at the IMG Academy in Bradenton, Florida. He returned to BW Gottschee, who he helped tobe champions of the Northeast Academy Conference in the 2016–17 season, and were ranked top 20 nationally.

While at youth level, Ritaccio was called up to various youth levels of the United States national team, joining camps at under-14, under-15, under-17 and under-19 level.

=== College ===
In 2018, Ritaccio began his college soccer career at the University of Akron. In four seasons with the Zips, Ritaccio made 58 appearances, scoring seven goals and tallying two assists. During his college career, he picked accolades including National Freshman of the Year by TopDrawerSoccer.com, as well as being tabbed to their Freshman Best XI first team in 2018, first-team All-MAC honoree, and was tabbed a third-team All-North United Soccer Coaches Regional selection in 2019, Second-Team All-MAC honoree and Academic All-MAC selection in 2020, and Academic All-MAC selection, as well as being recognized as First-Team Academic All-Ohio recipient in 2021.

While at college, Ritaccio also played in the USL League Two, spending the summer of 2019 with New York Red Bulls U-23 side, where he made three appearances, before joining Long Island Rough Riders to make six appearances. He then returned to join the Rough Riders in 2021, playing in two regular season games. During this spell, he was named to the USL League Two's '20 under 20' list.

=== Professional ===
On January 11, 2022, Ritaccio was selected 63rd overall in the 2022 MLS SuperDraft by Chicago Fire. On March 10, 2022, he signed a professional contract with Chicago's MLS Next Pro side Chicago Fire FC II ahead of the league's inaugural season. During the 2022 season, he went on to make 19 appearances for the club.

== Personal ==
Carlo's younger brother, Matteo, is also a professional soccer player, who currently plays with the Liverpool academy. His older brother, Giraldo, also played college soccer, spending four seasons at SUNY Oneonta.
