= Jacob Akanyirige =

American professional soccer player (born 2001)

Personal information
- Date of birth: December 30, 2001 (age 24)
- Place of birth: Pleasanton, California, U.S.
- Height: 5 ft 11 in (1.80 m)
- Position: Right back

Youth career
- 2015–2016: Ballistic United SC
- 2016–2017: San Jose Earthquakes

Senior career*
Years	Team	Apps	(Gls)
2018–2021	San Jose Earthquakes	1	(0)
2019	→ Reno 1868 (loan)	4	(0)
2022	Rochester New York FC	17	(1)
2023–2024	New England Revolution II	17	(0)

International career^{‡}
2020	United States U20	2	(0)
- * Club domestic league appearances and goals as of January 8, 2025 ‡ National team caps and goals as of July 10, 2020

Jacob Akanyirige (born December 30, 2001) is an American professional soccer player who plays as a right back.

== Career ==
=== Youth ===
Akanyirige played for Pleasanton, CA's Ballistic United SC during the 2015–2016 season for their U.S. Soccer Developmental Academy's Under 13/14 team. In 2016–2017, he joined San Jose's U-15 squad and quickly moved up the academy ranks. After making one appearance for the U-17 side in 2017–18, he moved up to the U-19s and was competing against players two and three years older than he was. Akanyirige's birthday makes him a unique prospect for the youth national teams as he is two days too old to play with the 2002 cycle and is the youngest, or among the youngest, in 2001.

=== Professional ===
==== San Jose Earthquakes ====
Akanyirige signed as San Jose's fourth ever Homegrown Player on December 15, 2017. At the time of his signing, he was the youngest player to sign for the Earthquakes as well as third-youngest player in MLS, and the eighth-youngest to ever sign a professional contract in MLS history. Following the 2021 season, San Jose declined their contract option on Akanyirige.

==== Rochester NY FC ====
Akanyirige Signed with Rochester New York FC on April 2, 2022, on a free transfer. Akanyridge debuted for Rochester during an U.S. Open Cup match against FC Motown. Akanyirige scored his first professional goal on May 14 in a match against Inter Miami II.

== International career ==
Born in the United States, Akanyirige is of Ghanaian descent. He is a youth international for the United States.

== Career statistics ==
As of June 21, 2024

Club	Season	League			Cup		Playoffs		Totals	
Club	Season	League	Apps	Goals	Apps	Goals	Apps	Goals	Apps	Goals
San Jose Earthquakes	2018	MLS	—		—		—		—	
San Jose Earthquakes	2019	MLS	—		0	0	—		0	0
San Jose Earthquakes	2020	MLS	1	0	0	0	—		1	0
San Jose Earthquakes	2021	MLS	0	0	—		—		0	0
San Jose Earthquakes	Total		1	0	0	0	—	—	1	0
Reno 1868 (loan)	2019	USL Championship	4	0	—		—		4	0
Rochester New York FC	2022	MLS Next Pro	17	1	2 (Note: Appearances in the U.S. Open Cup)	0	1	0	20	1
New England Revolution II	2023	MLS Next Pro	17	0	—		0	0	17	0
New England Revolution II	2024	MLS Next Pro	—		—		—		—	
New England Revolution II	Total		17	0	—		0	0	17	0
Career total			39	1	2	0	1	0	42	1
