= Paulo Soares (footballer) =

Footballer (born 1999)

Personal information
- Date of birth: 1 December 1999 (age 26)
- Place of birth: Sal, Cape Verde
- Position: Midfielder

College career
| Years | Team | Apps | (Gls) |
| 2017–2021 | Quinnipiac Bobcats | | |

Senior career*
| Years | Team | Apps | (Gls) |
| 2022 | Rochester New York FC | 10 | (0) |
| 2024 | Dobrudzha | 7 | (0) |
| 2024-2025 | Sportist Svoge | 10 | (0) |

International career^{‡}
| 2019 | Cape Verde U19 | 2 | (0) |
| 2022 | Cape Verde | 1 | (0) |
- * Club domestic league appearances and goals as of 9 June 2026 (UTC) ‡ National team caps and goals as of 9 June 2026 (UTC)

Paulo Soares (born 1 December 1999) is a professional footballer who plays as a midfielder . Born in the United States, he is a Cape Verde international.

== Early life ==
Born in the United States, Soares returned to Cape Verde as a child with his family, before returning again to the United States, where he captained the soccer team at Quincy High School in Quincy, Massachusetts. In Cape Verde, Soares had been scouted by Italian and Portuguese teams but his family prioritized his education, thus the decision to send him back to the United States instead.

== Career ==
=== College career ===
Soares played college soccer for the Quinnipiac Bobcats and made the Metro Atlantic Athletic Conference (MAAC) All-Rookie team. During the 2021 season, he made the All-MAAC team and the MAAC All-Academic team. He also captained the Quinnipiac Bobcats.

=== Club career ===
Before the 2022 season, Soares signed for American side Rochester New York FC.

On 13 January 2024, Soares joined Bulgarian second division club Dobrudzha.

== International career ==
Soares played for the Cape Verde national under-15, under-16, and under-19 teams, and has captained the national under-19 team. He debuted for Cape Verde during a 1–0 loss to Ecuador.

== Style of play ==
Soares can operate as a center midfielder and a defensive midfielder and is known for his work ethic.

== Personal life ==
His father is a civil engineer.

== Career statistics ==
=== Club ===
As of 8 August 2024

Appearances and goals by club, season and competition
| Club | Season | League | | | Cup | | Other | | Total | |
| Club | Season | Division | Apps | Goals | Apps | Goals | Apps | Goals | Apps | Goals |
|---|---|---|---|---|---|---|---|---|---|---|
| Rochester New York | 2022 | MLS Next Pro | 10 | 0 | 1 (Note: Appearances in U.S. Open Cup) | 0 | 0 | 0 | 11 | 0 |
| Dobrudzha | 2023-24 | Second League | 7 | 0 | — | — | — | — | 7 | 0 |
| Sportist Svoge | 2024-25 | Second League | 10 | 0 | — | — | — | — | 10 | 0 |
| Career Total | | | 27 | 0 | 1 | 0 | 0 | 0 | 28 | 0 |

=== International ===
Appearances and goals by national team and year
| National Team | Year | Apps | Goals |
|---|---|---|---|
| Cape Verde | 2022 | 1 | 0 |
| Total | | 1 | 0 |
