= Chicago Fire FC II =

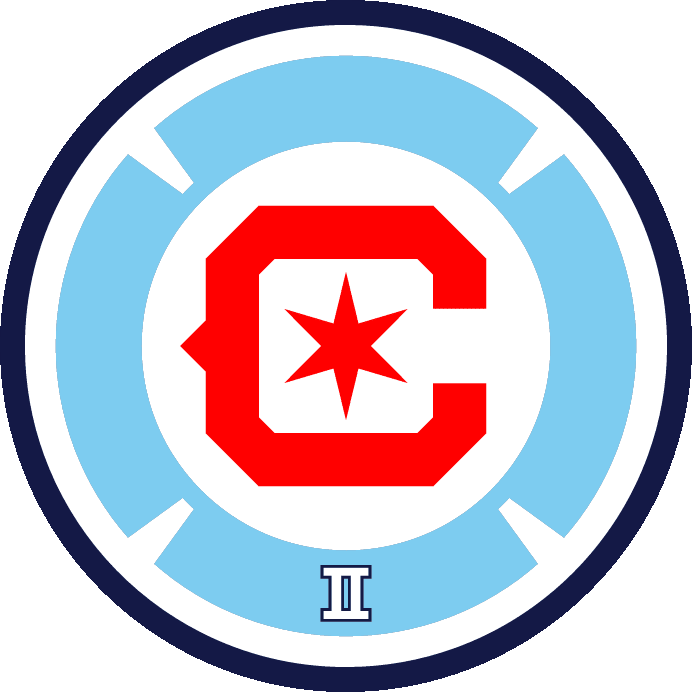
- Full name: Chicago Fire FC II
- Founded: December 6, 2021; 4 years ago
- Stadium: SeatGeek Stadium
- Capacity: 20,000
- Head coach: Mike Matkovich
- League: MLS Next Pro
- 2025: 6th, Eastern Conference; Playoffs: Conference Semifinals
- Website: www.chicagofirefc.com
Home colors	Away colors

Chicago Fire FC II is an American professional soccer team that is located in Bridgeview, Illinois. It is the reserve team of Chicago Fire FC and participates in MLS Next Pro.

== History ==
On December 6, 2021, the Chicago Fire FC were named as one of 21 clubs that would field a team in the new MLS Next Pro league beginning in the 2022 season.

== Players and staff ==
=== Roster ===
As of June 30, 2024

No.	Pos.	Nation	Player
30	DF	USA	Jack Sandmeyer
34	DF	USA	Omar Gonzalez
41	FW	FRA	Tidiane Diawara (on loan from Stade Lavallois)
43	DF	CAN	Olu Oyegunle
45	MF	GUY	Mateo Clark
46	MF	USA	Christopher Morales
48	MF	USA	Richard Fleming III
49	MF	COL	Jhoiner Montiel
51	FW	ITA	Claudio Cassano
55	MF	SUI	Damian Nigg
57	MF	USA	Darris Hyte
58	MF	RSA	Brody Williams
60	GK	USA	Jason Memo
61	MF	USA	Harrison Bernhardt
68	FW	USA	Vitaliy Hlyut
71	FW	BEN	David Tchétchao Karo
91	GK	USA	Owen Pratt
—	FW	USA	DeAndre Beckford

Chicago Fire MLS roster player
Chicago Fire academy player

=== Staff ===
- Alex Boler – General Manager
- Mike Matkovich – Head Coach
- Omar Gonzalez – Assistant Coach

== Team Records ==
=== Year-by-year ===
Season	MLS Next Pro									Playoffs	US Open Cup	Top Scorer	
Season	P	W	D	L	GF	GA	Pts	Conference	Overall	Playoffs	US Open Cup	Player	Goals
2022	24	8	5	11	41	44	31	8th, Eastern	16th	Did not qualify	Did not qualify	(United States) Victor Bezerra	8
2023	28	9	11	8	54	46	43	6th, Eastern	14th	Eastern Conference Quarterfinals	Did not qualify	(United States) Billy Hency	8
2024	28	11	9	8	51	51	47	4th, Eastern	7th	Eastern Conference Semifinals	Third Round	(Poland) David Poreba	18
2025	28	12	7	9	69	58	48	6th, Eastern	10th	Eastern Conference Semifinals	Did not qualify	(United States) Jason Shokalook	20
2026	22	9	6	7	69	45	34	7th, Eastern	13th	TBA	Did not qualify	(United States) Jason Shokalook	7

=== Head coaches record ===
As of August 18, 2026

Name	Nationality	From	To	P	W	D	L	GF	GA	Win%
Ludovic Taillandier	France	February 24, 2022	November 12, 2024	86	30	26	30	158	150	34.88
Mike Matkovich	United States	December 6, 2024	present	53	22	13	18	119	99	41.51

== See also ==
- Chicago Fire U-23
- MLS Next Pro
