= FC Cincinnati 2 =

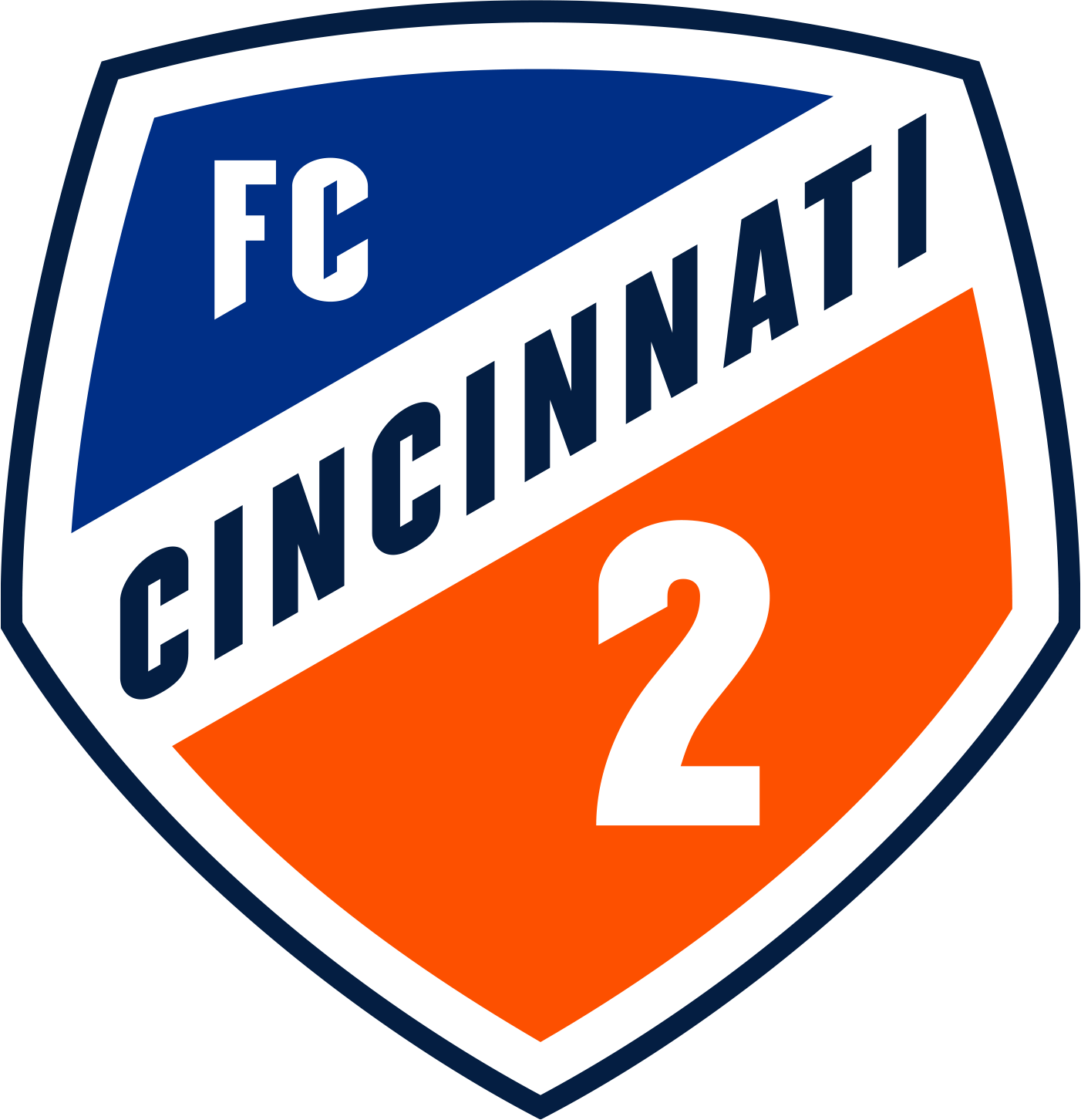
- Full name: FC Cincinnati 2
- Founded: December 6, 2021; 4 years ago
- Stadium: NKU Soccer Stadium; Highland Heights, Kentucky
- Capacity: 1,000
- Head coach: Sammy Castellanos
- League: MLS Next Pro
- 2025: 7th, Eastern Conference; Playoffs: Conference Quarterfinals
- Website: fccincinnati.com/fccincinnati2
Home colors	Away colors

FC Cincinnati 2 is an American professional soccer team based in Cincinnati, Ohio, United States. It is the reserve team of FC Cincinnati and participates in MLS Next Pro.

== History ==
On December 6, 2021, FC Cincinnati were named as one of 21 clubs that would field a team in the new MLS Next Pro league beginning in the 2022 season. On February 22, 2022, FC Cincinnati unveiled the name and coaching staff of the new team.

== Stadium ==
On February 24, 2022, the team announced that for their inaugural season, they would use three different venues as their home stadium. Their first seven home matches would be played at NKU Soccer Stadium, a 1,000-capacity venue at Northern Kentucky University in Highland Heights, Kentucky. Four of their remaining five matches would be played at Mercy Health Training Center, the team's training facility in Milford, Ohio which includes a 500-capacity stadium. One match would be played at TQL Stadium, the first team's 26,000-capacity home venue in Cincinnati, Ohio.

== Players and staff ==
=== Roster ===
As of January 17, 2024

No.	Pos.	Nation	Player
31	GK	USA	Bryan Dowd
40	DF	COL	Dilan Hurtado
41	DF	COL	Deiver Mosquera
42	FW	HON	Mathías Vásquez (on loan from F.C. Motagua)
43	FW	USA	Charlie Holmes
44	DF	USA	Giovanni Marioni
45	MF	USA	Nathan Gray
47	DF	USA	Michael Sullivan
48	DF	FRA	Sami Lachekar
50	DF	CAN	Félix Samson (on loan from CF Montréal)
51	FW	SEN	Cheikhou Nieng
52	MF	VEN	Yair Ramos
54	MF	USA	Jack Mize
55	DF	LBA	Ayoub Lajhar
57	MF	USA	Leo Orejarena
88	DF	USA	Andrei Chirilă

Signed to first team contract with the FC Cincinnati.
FC Cincinnati academy player.

=== Technical staff ===
Title	Name
Head coach	Sammy Castellanos
Assistant coach	Anthony Wallace
Individual development coach & assistant coach	Alejandro Guido
Goalkeeper coach	Ryan Coulter

Last updated: May 15, 2025
Source: FC Cincinnati

== Team records ==
=== Year-by-year ===
Season	MLS Next Pro									Playoffs	US Open Cup	Top Scorer	
Season	P	W	D	L	GF	GA	Pts	Conference	Overall	Playoffs	US Open Cup	Player	Goals
2022	24	4	3	17	27	65	17	10th, Eastern	21st	DNQ	NA	(United States) Nick Markanich (Guatemala) Arquimides Ordonez	4
2023	28	7	4	17	37	65	27	12th, Eastern	24th	DNQ	NA	(Guatemala) Arquimides Ordóñez	9
2024	28	16	4	8	47	34	54	1st, Eastern	3rd	Conference Quarterfinals	NA	(France) Kenji Mboma Dem (United States) Ben Stitz	7
2025	28	9	7	12	40	41	41	7th, Eastern	16th	Conference Quarterfinals	First Round	(Romania) Ștefan Chirilă	9
2026	19	4	2	13	19	36	16	15th, Eastern	28th	NA	NA	(Romania) Ștefan Chirilă	7

=== Head coaches record ===
As of September 20, 2026

Name	Nationality	From	To	P	W	D	L	GF	GA	Win%
Tyrone Marshall	Jamaica	February 22, 2022	December 8, 2025	111	36	19	56	153	209	32.43
Sammy Castellanos	United States	January 8, 2026	Present	28	5	3	20	32	62	17.86

== See also ==
- MLS Next Pro
