= 2019 Orlando City B season =

Season of American association football team

Orlando City B
2019 season
- Manager: Fernando De Argila (until July 25); Roberto Sibaja (interim from July 25)
- Stadium: Montverde Academy
- USL League One: 10th
- Playoffs: DNQ
- Top goalscorer: Thiago De Souza (6)
- Highest home attendance: 327 (June 7 vs. Forward Madison FC)
- Lowest home attendance: 144 (June 28 vs. Greenville)
- Average home league attendance: 203
- Biggest win: 2–0 (May 17 vs. Toronto FC II)
- Biggest defeat: 1–4 (May 11 vs. North Texas SC) (July 24 vs. Tormenta FC); 0–3 (August 3 vs. Lansing Ignite FC)
Home colors	Away colors

The 2019 Orlando City B season was the club's third year of existence and their first returning from hiatus during the 2018 season. It was their first season as a founding member of USL League One, the third tier of the United States soccer pyramid, after moving from the second tier now rebranded as USL Championship in the restructuring. The team also moved from Orlando City Stadium where they spent the 2017 season, to Montverde Academy which already housed Orlando City's Development Academy.

On October 3, 2018, Fernando De Argila was announced as head coach. He had previously been head coach and director of methodology at the Soccer Institute at Montverde Academy (S.I.M.A).

Speaking in October, OCB General Manager Mike Potempa highlighted that the change of division would help shift the team's focus to providing a one-way stepping stone between the Development Academy and senior MLS side. Whereas the previous OCB incarnation had had a mix of youth and older veteran players with others also being loaned down from the MLS team, the new roster would contain "young players that need to play between the ages of 16 and 24" and that international players "need to be high, high-level players because you have seven spaces and you can’t get those wrong. We really have to be careful on our choices for the international spots.”

On July 25, De Argila was relieved of his head coaching duties with the team sitting at the bottom of the table and following a run of six defeats in seven games. Orlando City U19 head coach Roberto Sibaja was appointed interim manager until the end of the season.

== Roster ==
As of August 24, 2019

No.	Nationality	Name	Position(s)	Date of birth (age)	Previous club	Notes
Goalkeepers
1	(Brazil)	Juliano Chade	GK	March 14, 1998 (aged 21)	(Brazil) Athletico Paranaense	Loan in
12	(Mexico)	Christian Herrera	GK	April 20, 1997 (aged 21)	(United States) Swope Park Rangers	–
23	(United States)	Luca Mancuso	GK	September 21, 2001 (aged 17)	(United States) Weston FC Academy	Academy
Defenders
2	(Brazil)	Léo Simas	DF	November 12, 1998 (aged 20)	(Brazil) Athletico Paranaense	Loan in
3	(United States)	Wilfred Williams	DF	June 4, 1996 (aged 22)	(United States) Detroit City FC	–
4	(Canada)	Brandon John	DF	January 5, 1995 (aged 24)	(United States) SIMA Águilas	–
6	(Brazil)	Matheus Silva	DF	December 8, 1996 (aged 22)	(United States) Swope Park Rangers	–
13	(United States)	Jordan Hill	DF	October 8, 1996 (aged 22)	(United States) Davidson Wildcats	–
14	(United States)	Randy Mendoza	DF	March 21, 1996 (aged 23)	(United States) UC Santa Barbara Gauchos	–
15	(United States)	Tanner Hummel	DF	August 16, 1996 (aged 22)	(United States) Kentucky Wildcats	–
16	(United States)	Jahlane Forbes	DF	February 5, 2002 (aged 17)	(United States) Orlando City Development Academy	Academy
26	(Ghana)	Emmanuel Hagan	DF	May 16, 2000 (aged 18)	(United States) Orlando City Development Academy	Academy
Midfielders
5	(Brazil)	Sérginho	MF	January 21, 2000 (aged 19)	(Brazil) Corinthians	–
7	(Democratic Republic of the Congo)	Tresor Mbuyu	MF	October 16, 1996 (aged 22)	(United States) Liberty Flames	–
10	(Brazil)	Rafael Santos	MF	May 22, 1995 (aged 23)	(United States) VCU Rams	–
11	(Brazil)	Thiago De Souza	MF	January 7, 2000 (aged 19)	(Brazil) Athletico Paranaense	Loan in
18	(United States)	Austin Amer	MF	February 17, 2000 (aged 19)	(United States) Orlando City Development Academy	Academy
19	(United States)	Jordan Bender	MF	July 9, 2001 (aged 17)	(United States) Orlando City Development Academy	Academy
20	(United States)	Steven Hernandez	MF	February 3, 1997 (aged 22)	(United States) American International Yellow Jackets	–
21	(Senegal)	Ates Diouf	MF	March 24, 2000 (aged 19)	(United States) Orlando City Development Academy	Academy
24	(Venezuela)	Moises Tablante	MF	July 4, 2001 (aged 17)	(United States) Orlando City Development Academy	Academy
27	(Venezuela)	José Quintero	MF	July 27, 2001 (aged 17)	(United States) Orlando City Development Academy	Academy
Forwards
8	(United States)	Koby Osei-Wusu	FW	December 26, 1995 (aged 23)	(United States) Richmond Kickers	–
9	(United States)	Will Bagrou	FW	June 19, 1996 (aged 22)	(United States) Mercer Bears	–
25	(United States)	Luc Granitur	FW	January 12, 2003 (aged 16)	(United States) Orlando City Development Academy	Academy
29	(Argentina)	Lucas Ontivero	FW	September 9, 1994 (aged 24)	(Malaysia) JDT II	–

== Competitions ==
=== Friendlies ===
February 13	Orlando City B	1–2	Tampa Bay Rowdies	Montverde, Florida
6:30 PM EDT	Unnamed	Report	Steinberger; Ekra	Stadium: Montverde Academy

February 17	Orlando City B	0–4	Miami FC	Montverde, Florida
4:00 PM EDT		Report	González 38'; Mares 73'; Chapman 79'; Sam 81'	Stadium: Montverde Academy

February 26	Orlando City B	1–2	Hartford Athletic	Montverde, Florida
	Goal	Report	Wojcik 25'; Angulo 90+3' (pen.)	Stadium: Montverde Academy

=== USL League One ===
In November 2018, USL announced that the inaugural USL League One season would consist of ten teams competing in a single table with the league's regular season consisting of 28 games in which everyone will play eight teams three times and the remaining one club four times. The 2019 regular season kicked off the weekend of March 29–31 and concluded on the weekend of October 4–6. At the end of which, four teams progressed to the playoffs.

==== Results summary ====
Overall								Home						Away					
Pld	W	D	L	GF	GA	GD	Pts	W	D	L	GF	GA	GD	W	D	L	GF	GA	GD
28	4	4	20	23	52	−29	16	3	3	8	15	25	−10	1	1	12	8	27	−19

Source: USL

==== Results by round ====
Round	1	2	3	4	5	6	7	8	9	10	11	12	13	14	15	16	17	18	19	20	21	22	23	24	25	26	27	28
Stadium	H	H	H	H	A	H	A	H	H	A	H	H	A	A	H	H	A	A	H	A	A	H	A	H	A	A	A	A
Result	L	L	D	L	L	D	L	W	W	D	W	L	L	L	L	D	L	L	L	L	L	L	L	L	L	L	W	L
Position	10	10	10	10	10	10	10	10	10	9	9	9	10	10	10	10	10	10	10	10	10	10	10	10	10	10	10	10

Source: USL
A = Away; H = Home; W = Win; D = Draw; L = Loss

==== Match results ====
March 30 1	Orlando City B	1–3	FC Tucson	Montverde, Florida
7:30 P.M. EDT	Diouf (yellow card) 35'; Hagan (yellow card) 38'; Mbuyu (yellow card) 40'; Mendoza (red card) 45'; Osei-Wusu 56'; Hill (yellow card) 62'; Granitur (yellow card) 90+5'	Report	Bjornethun (yellow card) 14'; Delgado 22', 54'; Wright 45+4'	Stadium: Montverde Academy; Attendance: 305; Referee: Jasmine Peralta

April 5 2	Orlando City B	0–2	Toronto FC II	Montverde, Florida
7:30 P.M. EDT	Hagan (yellow card) 34' (yellow-red card) 46'; Hernandez (yellow card) 74'	Report	Petrasso 48'; Ovalle (yellow card) 52'; Perruzza 86'	Stadium: Montverde Academy; Attendance: 244; Referee: Amin Hadzic

April 14 3	Orlando City B	1–1	South Georgia Tormenta	Montverde, Florida
5:00 P.M. EDT	Tablante (yellow card) 48'; Diouf (yellow card) 56', (goal) 59'; Hernandez (yellow card) 84'; Amer (yellow card) 90+4'	Report	Eckenrode (yellow card) 2', (goal) 90+4'; Dennis (yellow card) 29'	Stadium: Montverde Academy; Attendance: 246; Referee: Madzid Coric

April 19 4	Orlando City B	1–2	Forward Madison FC	Montverde, Florida
7:30 P.M. EDT	Granitur (yellow card) 25'; Osei-Wusu 36' (pen.); Sérginho (yellow card) 55'; Simeon (yellow card) 67'	Report	Núñez 58'; Russell 70'; Toye (yellow card) 72'; Smart (yellow card) 81' (yellow-red card) 81'; Michaud (yellow card) 85'	Stadium: Montverde Academy; Attendance: 189; Referee: Natalie Simon

April 27 5	North Texas SC	1–0	Orlando City B	Frisco, Texas
5:50 P.M. EDT	Silva 42' (o.g.); Bissainthe (yellow card) 81'	Report	Léo (yellow card) 90+2'	Stadium: Toyota Stadium; Attendance: 3,512; Referee: Matthew Corrigan

May 3 6	Orlando City B	0–0	Chattanooga Red Wolves	Montverde, Florida
7:30 P.M. EDT	Silva (yellow card) 37'	Report	Folla (yellow card) 88'	Stadium: Montverde Academy; Attendance: 176; Referee: Tori Penso

May 11 7	North Texas SC	4–1	Orlando City B	Frisco, Texas
4:20 P.M. EDT	Gómez (yellow card) 38', (goal) 77'; Tessmann 69'; Rodriguez 86' (pen.): Damus 88'	Report	Léo (yellow card) 33'; Bagrou 48'; Simeon (yellow card) 90+5'	Stadium: Toyota Stadium; Referee: Reyna Fonseca

May 17 8	Orlando City B	2–0	Toronto FC II	Montverde, Florida
7:30 P.M. EDT	Sérginho (yellow card) 11'; Tablante 42', (yellow card) 73'; Thiago (yellow card) 62', (goal) 75' (pen.)	Report	Okello (yellow card) 16'; Perruzza (yellow card) 38'; Mingo (red card) 44'; Campbell (yellow card) 83'	Stadium: Montverde Academy; Attendance: 172; Referee: Luis Guardia

May 22 9	Orlando City B	3–2	Richmond Kickers	Montverde, Florida
7:30 P.M. EDT	Tablante 4'; Sérginho 27'; Rafael (yellow card) 35'; Amer (yellow card) 37'; Léo (yellow card) 76'; Thiago 85' (pen.)	Report	Hughes (yellow card) 22', (goal) 80'; Lockaby 35'; Rodriguez (yellow card) 51'; Bolduc (yellow card) 70'; Fitzgerald (yellow card) 86'	Stadium: Montverde Academy; Attendance: 148; Referee: Jamie Willis

May 31 10	FC Tucson	2–2	Orlando City B	Tucson, Arizona
9:30 P.M. EDT	Wheeler-Omiunu 58'; Terrón 73'; Cox (yellow card) 84'	Report	Silva (yellow card) 35'; Rafael 44'; Sérginho (yellow card) 65'; Osei-Wusu (yellow card) 72', (goal) 78'; Léo (yellow card) 85'	Stadium: Kino Sports Complex; Attendance: 1,354; Referee: Omeed Azadpour

June 7 11	Orlando City B	2–1	Forward Madison FC	Montverde, Florida
7:30 P.M. EDT	Rafael 23'; Mendoza (yellow card) 61'; Thiago 63'; Herrera (yellow card) 69'	Report	Schneider (yellow card) 41'; Ng'anzi (yellow card) 54'; Michaud (yellow card) 59'; Bement 89'	Stadium: Montverde Academy; Attendance: 327; Referee: Gabriele Giusti

June 12 12	Orlando City B	1–2	FC Tucson	Montverde, Florida
7:30 P.M. EDT	Amer (yellow card) 21'; Tablante (yellow card) 56'; Thiago 59' (pen.); Hernandez (yellow card) 81'	Report	Cox 44'; Venter 45+1'; Stripling (yellow card) 66'; Delgado (yellow card) 90+1'	Stadium: Montverde Academy; Attendance: 183; Referee: Natalie Simon

June 15 13	South Georgia Tormenta	2–0	Orlando City B	Statesboro, Georgia
8:00 P.M. EDT	Rowe 54'; Morrell 86'	Report	Léo (yellow card) 90+3'	Stadium: Tormenta Park; Attendance: 1,490; Referee: Amin Hadzic

June 22 14	Lansing Ignite FC	2–0	Orlando City B	Lansing, Michigan
7:00 P.M. EDT	Moshobane (yellow card) 28'; Moon 51'; Bruce (yellow card) 59'; Coiffic 68'	Report	Bagrou (yellow card) 30'	Stadium: Cooley Law School Stadium; Attendance: 4,818; Referee: Chris Ruska

June 28 15	Orlando City B	0–2	Greenville Triumph SC	Orlando, Florida
7:30 P.M. EDT	Sérginho (yellow card) 31'; Diouf (yellow card) 72'	Report	Polak (yellow card) 18'; Saul 41'; Mohamed (yellow card) 67'; Gómez 83'	Stadium: Montverde Academy; Attendance: 144; Referee: Joshua Encarnación

July 10 16	Orlando City B	1–1	Chattanooga Red Wolves	Montverde, Florida
7:30 P.M. EDT	Tablante (yellow card) 25'; Silva (yellow card) 87' (yellow-red card) 88'; Mbuyu 90+1'	Report	Seoane 13'; Ualefi (yellow card) 56'; Doyle (yellow card) 86'	Stadium: Montverde Academy; Attendance: 145; Referee: Tori Penso

July 13 17	Greenville Triumph SC	1–0	Orlando City B	Greenville, South Carolina
7:00 P.M. EDT	Mohamed (yellow card) 79'; Walker 88'	Report	Herrera (yellow card) 83'	Stadium: Legacy Early College; Referee: Gustavo Solorio

July 20 18	Richmond Kickers	1–0	Orlando City B	Richmond, Virginia
7:00 P.M. EDT	Magalhães (yellow card) 31'; Troyer (yellow card) 68'; Chin 70'; Fitzgerald (red card) 83'	Report	Tablante (yellow card) 44'; Diouf (yellow card) 78'; Bagrou (red card) 83'; Mendoza (red card) 83'	Stadium: City Stadium; Referee: Gabriele Giusti

July 24 19	Orlando City B	1–4	South Georgia Tormenta	Montverde, Florida
7:30 P.M. EDT	Thiago 40', (yellow card) 42'; Sérginho (yellow card) 64'; Forbes (yellow card) 66'	Report	Micaletto 7', 14'; Morrell 23'; Gómez (yellow card) 56'; Antley 61'	Stadium: Montverde Academy; Attendance: 191; Referee: Jonathan Bilinski

July 27 20	Forward Madison FC	1–0	Orlando City B	Madison, Wisconsin
8:00 P.M. EDT	Smart (yellow card) 30'; Banks 57'; Leonard (yellow card) 83'; Bement (yellow card) 89'; Díaz (yellow card) 90+4'	Report	Diouf (yellow card) 34'; Hill (yellow card) 67'; Léo (yellow card) 83'; Herrera (yellow card) 89'	Stadium: Breese Stevens Field; Attendance: 4,539; Referee: Laura Rodriguez

August 3 21	Lansing Ignite FC	3–0	Orlando City B	Lansing, Michigan
7:00 P.M. EDT	Moshobane 8'; N'For 14'; Mentzingen 84'	Report	Tablante (yellow card) 37'; Thiago (yellow card) 50'; Amer (yellow card) 87'	Stadium: Cooley Law School Stadium; Attendance: 3,285; Referee: Carter Brochu

August 16 22	Orlando City B	1–2	Lansing Ignite FC	Montverde, Florida
7:30 P.M. EDT	Forbes (yellow card) 13'; Tablante (yellow card) 42'; Bagrou 71'	Report	Gomez 22', (yellow card) 82'; Coiffic (yellow card) 28'; Mentzingen 54'	Stadium: Montverde Academy; Attendance: 195; Referee: Joshua Encarnación

August 24 23	FC Tucson	3–1	Orlando City B	Tucson, Arizona
9:30 P.M. EDT	Delgado 36'; Jones 43'; Howell (yellow card) 53'; Virgen (yellow card) 61', (goal) 69'	Report	Ontivero (yellow card) 57'; Léo 76'	Stadium: Kino Sports Complex; Attendance: 848; Referee: Karen Callado

September 6 24	Orlando City B	1–3	North Texas SC	Montverde, Florida
7:30 P.M. EDT	John 53'; Rafael (yellow card) 81'; Ontivero (yellow card) 83'; Léo (yellow card) 89'	Report	Nelson 22'; Damus 54', 70' (pen.); Jatta (yellow card) 57'; Bissainthe (yellow card) 62'; Sealy (yellow card) 75'; Almaguer (yellow card) 90+5'	Stadium: Montverde Academy; Attendance: 171; Referee: Alex Billeter

September 13 25	Toronto FC II	3–2	Orlando City B	Toronto, Ontario
4:00 P.M. EDT	Perruzza 39' (pen.), 56'; Faria (yellow card) 51'; Hummel 85' (o.g.)	Report	Ontivero 23'; Juliano (yellow card) 38'; Thiago 71' (pen.), (yellow card) 72'	Stadium: BMO Training Ground; Attendance: 120; Referee: Brad Doubrough

September 21 26	Chattanooga Red Wolves	2–1	Orlando City B	Chattanooga, Tennessee
7:00 P.M. EDT	Folla (yellow card) 20' (yellow-red card) 74'; Seoane 34'; Soto (yellow card) 50'; Walls 54'; Mare (yellow card) 90+1'; Amponsah (yellow card) 90+3'	Report	Léo 45+1', (yellow card) 62' (yellow-red card) 67'; Sérginho (yellow card) 84'; John (yellow card) 88'	Stadium: David Stanton Field; Attendance: 1,173; Referee: Nickrod Fateh

September 27 27	Greenville Triumph SC	0–1	Orlando City B	Greenville, South Carolina
7:00 P.M. EDT	Clowes (yellow card) 37'; Saul (yellow card) 75'	Report	Hummel (yellow card) 45+3'; Bagrou 53', (yellow card) 79'; John (yellow card) 55'; Mbuyu (yellow card) 68'; Sérginho (red card) 90+3'	Stadium: Legacy Early College; Attendance: 4,014; Referee: Kevin Broadley

October 5 28	Richmond Kickers	2–0	Orlando City B	Richmond, Virginia
7:00 P.M. EDT	Shanosky 31'; Boateng 36', (yellow card) 81'; Fitzgerald (yellow card) 90+4'	Report	Hummel (yellow card) 38'; Rafael (yellow card) 69'; Léo (yellow card) 90+1'; Bagrou (yellow card) 90+1'	Stadium: City Stadium; Attendance: 3,819; Referee: Adorae Whitesel

==== Table ====
Pos	Team	Pld	W	D	L	GF	GA	GD	Pts
6	South Georgia Tormenta FC	28	9	10	9	32	34	−2	37
7	Toronto FC II	28	9	9	10	43	46	−3	36
8	FC Tucson	28	8	9	11	35	41	−6	33
9	Richmond Kickers	28	9	5	14	26	35	−9	32
10	Orlando City B	28	4	4	20	23	52	−29	16

Source: 2019 USL League One standings
Rules for classification: 1) total wins; 2) total goal differential; 3) total goals scored; 4) points earned against top four Conference finishers; 5) disciplinary points; 6) coin toss or drawing of lots

=== U.S. Open Cup ===
Due to their ownership by a more advanced level professional club, Orlando City B is one of 13 teams ineligible for the Cup competition.

== Squad statistics ==
=== Appearances ===
As of matches played October 5, 2019

No.	Pos.	Name	USL1	
No.	Pos.	Name	Apps	Starts
1	GK	(Brazil) Juliano Chade	17	17
2	DF	(Brazil) Léo Simas	22	22
3	DF	(United States) Wilfred Williams	6	4
4	DF	(Canada) Brandon John	10	10
5	MF	(Brazil) Sérginho	24	21
6	DF	(Brazil) Matheus Silva	18	18
7	MF	(Democratic Republic of the Congo) Tresor Mbuyu	19	8
8	FW	(United States) Koby Osei-Wusu	19	11
9	FW	(United States) Will Bagrou	23	19
10	MF	(Brazil) Rafael Santos	16	14
11	MF	(Brazil) Thiago De Souza	22	20
12	GK	(Mexico) Christian Herrera	10	10
13	DF	(United States) Jordan Hill	15	13
14	DF	(United States) Randy Mendoza	21	21
15	DF	(United States) Tanner Hummel	8	6
16	DF	(United States) Jahlane Forbes	2	1
17	MF	(United States) Ignacio Cubeddu	0	0
18	MF	(United States) Austin Amer	26	22
19	MF	(United States) Jordan Bender	16	12
20	MF	(United States) Steven Hernandez	18	6
21	MF	(Senegal) Ates Diouf	17	15
22	MF	(Bolivia) Sebastian Joffre	3	0
23	GK	(United States) Luca Mancuso	1	1
24	MF	(Venezuela) Moises Tablante	13	12
25	FW	(United States) Luc Granitur	15	8
26	DF	(Ghana) Emmanuel Hagan	2	2
27	MF	(Venezuela) José Quintero	3	1
28	DF	(Canada) Nathan Simeon	15	15
29	FW	(Argentina) Lucas Ontivero	5	5

=== Goalscorers ===
As of matches played October 5, 2019

Rank	Pos.	No.	Name	USL1
1	MF	11	(Brazil) Thiago De Souza	6
2	FW	8	(United States) Koby Osei-Wusu	3
2	FW	9	(United States) Will Bagrou	3
4	DF	2	(Brazil) Léo Simas	2
4	MF	10	(Brazil) Rafael Santos	2
4	MF	24	(Venezuela) Moises Tablante	2
7	DF	4	(Canada) Brandon John	1
7	MF	5	(Brazil) Sérginho	1
7	FW	7	(Democratic Republic of the Congo) Tresor Mbuyu	1
7	MF	21	(Senegal) Ates Diouf	1
7	FW	29	(Argentina) Lucas Ontivero	1
Total				23

=== Shutouts ===
As of matches played October 5, 2019

Rank	No.	Name	USL1
1	1	(Brazil) Juliano Chade	3
Total			3

=== Disciplinary record ===
As of matches played October 5, 2019

No.	Pos.	Name	USL1	
No.	Pos.	Name	Booked	Sent off (straight red)
1	GK	(Brazil) Juliano Chade	1	0
2	DF	(Brazil) Léo Simas	8	1
4	DF	(Canada) Brandon John	2	0
5	MF	(Brazil) Sérginho	6	1
6	DF	(Brazil) Matheus Silva	2	1
7	MF	(Democratic Republic of the Congo) Tresor Mbuyu	2	0
8	FW	(United States) Koby Osei-Wusu	1	0
9	FW	(United States) Will Bagrou	3	1
10	MF	(Brazil) Rafael Santos	3	0
11	MF	(Brazil) Thiago De Souza	4	0
12	GK	(Mexico) Christian Herrera	3	0
13	DF	(United States) Jordan Hill	2	0
14	DF	(United States) Randy Mendoza	1	2
15	DF	(United States) Tanner Hummel	2	0
16	DF	(United States) Jahlane Forbes	2	0
18	MF	(United States) Austin Amer	3	0
20	MF	(United States) Steven Hernandez	3	0
21	MF	(Senegal) Ates Diouf	5	0
24	MF	(Venezuela) Moises Tablante	8	0
25	FW	(United States) Luc Granitur	2	0
26	DF	(Ghana) Emmanuel Hagan	1	1
28	DF	(Canada) Nathan Simeon	2	0
29	FW	(Argentina) Lucas Ontivero	2	0
Total			68	7

== Player movement ==
=== Transfers in ===
No.	Name	Pos.	Transferred from	Fee/notes	Date	Ref.
12	(Mexico) Christian Herrera	GK	(United States) Swope Park Rangers	Signed professional contract	February 20, 2019	
3	(United States) Wilfred Williams	DF	(United States) Detroit City FC	Signed professional contract	February 20, 2019	
4	(Canada) Brandon John	DF	(United States) SIMA Águilas	Signed professional contract	February 20, 2019	
6	(Brazil) Matheus Silva	DF	(United States) Swope Park Rangers	Signed professional contract	February 20, 2019	
13	(United States) Jordan Hill	DF	(United States) Davidson Wildcats	Signed professional contract	February 20, 2019	
14	(United States) Randy Mendoza	DF	(United States) UC Santa Barbara Gauchos	Signed professional contract	February 20, 2019	
15	(United States) Tanner Hummel	DF	(United States) Kentucky Wildcats	Signed professional contract	February 20, 2019	
5	(Brazil) Sérginho	MF	(Brazil) Corinthians	Signed professional contract	February 20, 2019	
7	(Democratic Republic of the Congo) Tresor Mbuyu	MF	(United States) Liberty Flames	Signed professional contract	February 20, 2019	
10	(Brazil) Rafael Santos	MF	(United States) VCU Rams	Signed professional contract	February 20, 2019	
20	(United States) Steven Hernandez	MF	(United States) American International Yellow Jackets	Signed professional contract	February 20, 2019	
22	(Bolivia) Sebastian Joffre	MF	(United States) Eastern Florida Titans	Signed professional contract	February 20, 2019	
8	(United States) Koby Osei-Wusu	FW	(United States) Richmond Kickers	Signed professional contract	February 20, 2019	
9	(United States) Will Bagrou	FW	(United States) Mercer Bears	Signed professional contract	February 20, 2019	
23	(United States) Luca Mancuso	GK	(United States) Weston FC Academy	Signed Academy contract	February 20, 2019	
17	(United States) Ignacio Cubeddu	MF	(United States) Weston FC Academy	Signed Academy contract	February 20, 2019	
16	(United States) Jahlane Forbes	DF	(United States) Orlando City Development Academy	Signed Academy contract	February 20, 2019	
26	(Ghana) Emmanuel Hagan	DF	(United States) Orlando City Development Academy	Signed Academy contract	February 20, 2019	
28	(Canada) Nathan Simeon	DF	(United States) Orlando City Development Academy	Signed Academy contract	February 20, 2019	
18	(United States) Austin Amer	MF	(United States) Orlando City Development Academy	Signed Academy contract	February 20, 2019	
19	(United States) Jordan Bender	MF	(United States) Orlando City Development Academy	Signed Academy contract	February 20, 2019	
21	(Senegal) Ates Diouf	MF	(United States) Orlando City Development Academy	Signed Academy contract	February 20, 2019	
24	(Venezuela) Moises Tablante	MF	(United States) Orlando City Development Academy	Signed Academy contract	February 20, 2019	
27	(Venezuela) José Quintero	MF	(United States) Orlando City Development Academy	Signed Academy contract	February 20, 2019	
25	(United States) Luc Granitur	FW	(United States) Orlando City Development Academy	Signed Academy contract	February 20, 2019	
29	(Argentina) Lucas Ontivero	FW	(Malaysia) JDT II	Signed professional contract	August 24, 2019	

=== Loans in ===
No.	Name	Pos.	Loaned from	Notes	Date	Ref.
1	(Brazil) Juliano Chade	GK	(Brazil) Athletico Paranaense	One year loan	February 20, 2019	
2	(Brazil) Léo Simas	DF	(Brazil) Athletico Paranaense	One year loan	February 20, 2019	
11	(Brazil) Thiago De Souza	MF	(Brazil) Athletico Paranaense	One year loan	February 20, 2019	

=== Transfers out ===
No.	Name	Pos.	Transferred to	Fee/notes	Date	Ref.
17	(United States) Ignacio Cubeddu	MF	(United States) Amherst Mammoths	Released	May 13, 2019	
22	(Bolivia) Sebastian Joffre	MF		Released	May 13, 2019	
28	(Canada) Nathan Simeon	DF	(United States) San Francisco Dons	Left for college	July 15, 2019	
23	(United States) Luca Mancuso	GK	(United States) NYU Violets	Left for college	August 1, 2019	
6	(Brazil) Matheus Silva	DF	(United States) Miami FC	Released; Signed with Miami FC on 10/02/19	September 6, 2019	
