= 2019 Tormenta FC season =

Tormenta FC
2019 season
- Owner: Van Tassell Group
- Head coach: John Miglarese
- Stadium: Eagle Field at Erk Russell Park
- USL League One: 6th
- USL1 Playoffs: Did not qualify
- U.S. Open Cup: First round
- Highest home attendance: 3,519 (March 29 vs. Greenville Triumph SC)
- Lowest home attendance: 1,038 (May 12 vs. Toronto FC II)
- Average home league attendance: 1,724
- Biggest win: 4–1 (July 24 at Orlando City B)
- Biggest defeat: 0–5 (August 27 at North Texas SC)

The 2019 Tormenta FC season was the club's fourth season of existence, and their first season as a professional club. It was their first season playing in the third tier of American soccer, USL League One.

== Background ==
In January 2018, Tormenta FC was announced as the first founding member of USL League One for 2019. The team had an undefeated regular season in 2018, clinching the USL League Two Deep South division championship.

== Club ==
=== Roster ===
No.	Position	Nation	Player
1	GK	CHI	Pablo Jara
2	DF	USA	Michael Mecham
3	DF	USA	Conner Antley
4	DF	USA	Lars Eckenrode
5	DF	AUS	Joshua Phelps
6	MF	USA	Ricardo Gómez
7	MF	USA	Dalton Pando
8	MF	ESP	Nil Vinyals
9	FW	IRL	Mikie Rowe
10	MF	ITA	Marco Micaletto
11	MF	ENG	Charlie Dennis
12	MF	USA	Peter Pearson
13	DF	USA	Daltyn Knutson
14	FW	USA	Alex Morrell
15	DF	ENG	Jordan Skelton
16	FW	USA	Kaleb Jackson
17	DF	USA	Yaw Amankwa
18	DF	ENG	Michael O'Sullivan
19	DF	USA	Nick Wells
20	DF	HAI	Jerry Saint-Vil
21	FW	USA	Jad Arslan
22	MF	BRA	Lucas Coutinho
24	MF	JPN	Shinya Kadono (on loan from Loudoun United)
25	MF	USA	Kobe Perez
26	GK	USA	Micah Bledsoe
27	DF	USA	Tristan DeLoach
29	GK	ARG	Matías Reynares
30	GK	AUS	Mitch Thorn

USL Academy Contract

=== Team management ===
As of September 19, 2018

- (United States) John Miglarese – VP of Player Development and Head Coach
- (Colombia) Jorge Gonzalez – Assistant Coach
- (United States) John Kot – Assistant Coach
- (United States) Mike Panter – VP of Soccer Operations
- (United States) Bryce Judy - Director of Gameday Operations
- (United States) Bernadette O'Donnell – Director of Communications and Public Relations
- (United States) Logan Gleaton – Director of Marketing and Fan Engagement
- (United States) James Griffith – Director of Ticket Sales and Sponsorships
- (United States) Zachary Delgard - Director of Cooperate Partnerships
- (United States) Logan Crosby - Director of Business Development
- (United States) Corey Stone - Assistant Director of Franchise Development
- (United States) Hope Mullett - Assistant Director of Franchise Development

== Competitive ==
=== USL League One ===
==== Standings ====
Pos	Team	Pld	W	D	L	GF	GA	GD	Pts	Qualification
4	Forward Madison FC	28	12	7	9	33	26	+7	43	Playoffs
5	Chattanooga Red Wolves SC	28	10	10	8	35	37	−2	40	
6	South Georgia Tormenta FC	28	9	10	9	32	34	−2	37	
7	Toronto FC II	28	9	9	10	43	46	−3	36	
8	FC Tucson	28	8	9	11	35	41	−6	33	

Source: 2019 USL League One standings
Rules for classification: 1) total wins; 2) total goal differential; 3) total goals scored; 4) points earned against top four Conference finishers; 5) disciplinary points; 6) coin toss or drawing of lots

==== Results by round ====
Round	1	2	3	4	5	6	7	8	9	10	11	12	13	14	15	16	17	18	19	20	21	22	23	24	25	26	27	28
Stadium	H	H	A	A	A	A	H	A	H	A	H	H	H	H	A	A	A	H	A	H	H	A	H	A	H	A	A	H
Result	W	W	D	D	L	W	W	W	D	D	D	W	W	L	L	D	W	D	L	L	D	L	L	D	L	D	L	W
Position	5	1	3	2	2	2	2	2	2	2	2	2	2	2	2	2	2	2	2	2	2	5	5	5	5	6	7	6

Source: USL
A = Away; H = Home; W = Win; D = Draw; L = Loss

==== Match reports ====
March 29 1	Tormenta FC	1–0	Greenville Triumph SC	Statesboro, Georgia
7:00 PM EDT	Morrell 72'	Report		Stadium: Eagle Field; Attendance: 3,519; Referee: Amin Hadzic

April 3 2	Tormenta FC	3–1	FC Tucson	Statesboro, Georgia
7:00 PM EDT	Morrell (yellow card) 38' (goal) 58'; Eckenrode (yellow card) 54'; Coutinho 57'; Vinyals (yellow card) 60'; Micaletto 74', (yellow card) 74'	Report	Vega 55'; Somersall (yellow card) 60'	Stadium: Eagle Field; Attendance: 1,573; Referee: John Griggs

April 6 3	Richmond Kickers	0–0	Tormenta FC	Richmond, Virginia
5:00 PM EDT	Ackwei (yellow card) 80'	Report	Phelps (yellow card) 29'; Pando (yellow card) 68'	Stadium: City Stadium; Attendance: 2,853; Referee: Kevin Broadley

April 14 4	Orlando City B	1–1	Tormenta FC	Montverde, Florida
5:00 P.M. EDT	Tablante (yellow card) 48'; Diouf (yellow card) 56', (goal) 59'; Hernandez (yellow card) 84'; Amer (yellow card) 90+4'	Report	Eckenrode (yellow card) 2', (goal) 90+4'; Dennis (yellow card) 29'	Stadium: Montverde Academy; Attendance: 246; Referee: Madzid Coric

April 20 5	Chattanooga Red Wolves	3–2	Tormenta FC	Chattanooga, Tennessee
7:00 PM EDT	Beattie 8', 17', (yellow card) 36'; Zayed 11'; Ualefi (yellow card) 69'; Dixon (yellow card) 79'; Zguro (yellow card) 90+4'	Report	Gómez (yellow card) 47'; Antley 74', (yellow card) 90+1'; Hellmann 88'	Stadium: David Stanton Field; Attendance: 2,119; Referee: Ben Meyer

April 26 6	FC Tucson	0–2	Tormenta FC	Tucson, Arizona
9:30 PM EDT	Terrón (yellow card) 78'	Report	Gómez (yellow card) 52'; Coutinho 63'; Saint-Vil (yellow card) 65'; Arslan (yellow card) 89'; Micaletto (yellow card) 90+4'; Antley 90+5'	Stadium: Kino North Stadium; Attendance: 1,005; Referee: Laura Rodriguez

May 12 7	Tormenta FC	3–2	Toronto FC II	Statesboro, Georgia
7:00 PM EDT	Dennis 28', (yellow card) 48', (goal) 90+3'; Phelps (yellow card) 45'; Wells (yellow card) 57'; Antley (yellow card) 76'; Micaletto 72' (pen.)	Report	Perruzza 14'; Bunk-Andersen 36'; Campbell (yellow card) 40'; Mohammed (red card) 73'; Swartz (yellow card) 79'; Ovalle (yellow card) 90+5'	Stadium: Eagle Field; Attendance: 1,038; Referee: Ekaterina Koroleva

May 18 8	Forward Madison FC	0–1	Tormenta FC	Madison, Wisconsin
7:00 p.m.	Tobin (yellow card) 45+4'	Report	Antley 50'; Micaletto (yellow card) 90'; Vinyals (yellow card) 90+2'	Stadium: Breese Stevens Field; Attendance: 3,762; Referee: Matthew Corrigan

May 25 9	Tormenta FC	0–0	Lansing Ignite FC	Statesboro, Georgia
7:00 PM EDT	Miccaletto (yellow card) 42'; Knutson (yellow card) 59'	Report	Cleveland (yellow card) 73'	Stadium: Eagle Field; Attendance: 1,697; Referee: Joshua Encarnacion

June 1 10	Greenville Triumph SC	0–0	Tormenta FC	Greenville, South Carolina
7:00 PM EDT	Politz (yellow card) 39'; Boland (yellow card) 53'; Walker (yellow card) 60'	Report	Gómez (yellow card) 73' (yellow-red card) 86'	Stadium: Legacy Early College Field; Attendance: 2,368; Referee: José Lara

June 8 11	Tormenta FC	P–P	Chattanooga Red Wolves	Statesboro, Georgia
8:00 PM EDT		Report		Stadium: Eagle Field; Referee: Luis Arroyo
Note: Match postponed to be played at a date TBD

June 15 12	Tormenta FC	2–0	Orlando City B	Statesboro, Georgia
8:00 PM EDT	Rowe 54'; Morrell 86'	Report	Léo (yellow card) 90+3'	Stadium: Eagle Field; Attendance: 1,490; Referee: Amin Hadzic

June 22 13	Tormenta FC	1–0	Richmond Kickers	Statesboro, Georgia
8:00 PM EDT	Morrell (yellow card) 79'; Micaletto 83' (pen.)	Report	Eckenrode (yellow card) 45+1'; Troyer (yellow card) 54'; Hughes (yellow card) 73'; Shanosky (yellow card) 85' (yellow-red card) 87'	Stadium: Eagle Field; Attendance: 1,602; Referee: Natalie Simon

July 6 14	Tormenta FC	1–2	Forward Madison FC	Statesboro, Georgia
8:00 PM EDT	Morrell (yellow card) 83'; Micaletto 90+1'	Report	Smart 16'; Schneider (yellow card) 52'; White 73'; Díaz (yellow card) 83'	Stadium: Eagle Field; Attendance: 1,529; Referee: Joshua Encarnación

July 12 15	Toronto FC II	3–0	Tormenta FC	Toronto, Ontario, Canada
4:00 PM EDT	Srbely 28'; Perruzza 38'; Mohammed (yellow card) 43'; Ovalle (yellow card) 63'; Romeo (yellow card) 74'; Bunk-Andersen 78'	Report		Stadium: BMO Training Ground; Attendance: 113; Referee: Brad Doubrough

July 20 16	North Texas SC	0–0	Tormenta FC	Frisco, Texas
7:00 P.M. EDT	Cerrillo (yellow card) 70'	Report	Vinyals (red card) 74'; Micaletto (yellow card) 88'	Stadium: Toyota Stadium; Attendance: 1,431; Referee: Samantha Martinez

July 24 17	Orlando City B	1–4	Tormenta FC	Montverde, Florida
7:30 P.M. EDT	Thiago 40' (yellow card) 42'; Sérginho (yellow card) 64'; Forbes (yellow card) 66'	Report	Micaletto 7', 14'; Morrell 23'; Gómez (yellow card) 56'; Antley 61'	Stadium: Montverde Academy; Attendance: 191; Referee: Jonathan Bilinski

July 27 18	Tormenta FC	1–1	Lansing Ignite FC	Statesboro, Georgia
8:00 PM EDT	Knutson (yellow card) 16'; Saint-Vil (yellow card) 21'; Kadono 88'; Micaletto (yellow card) 90'; Morrell (yellow card) 90+3'	Report	Mentzingen 12', (yellow card) 45+3'; Coiffic (yellow card) 35'; Stoneman (yellow card) 60'; Carr (yellow card) 90+3'	Stadium: Eagle Field; Attendance: 1,785; Referee: Nickrod Fateh

August 3 19	Greenville Triumph SC	1–0	Tormenta FC	Greenville, South Carolina
7:00 PM EDT	Keegan 29'; Walker (yellow card) 78'; Hemmings (yellow card) 81'; Guediri (yellow card) 84'	Report	Dennis (yellow card) 58'; Arslan (yellow card) 87'	Stadium: Legacy Early College Field; Attendance: 2,074; Referee: Wilmer Soriano

August 10 20	Tormenta FC	1–2	Chattanooga Red Wolves	Statesboro, Georgia
8:00 PM EDT	Phelps (yellow card) 47'; Coutinho 67'; Rowe (yellow card) 74'	Report	Beattie (yellow card) 27'; Seoane 57'; Soto 84', (yellow card) 87'	Stadium: Eagle Field; Attendance: 1,560; Referee: Luis Arroyo

August 17 21	Tormenta FC	1–1	FC Tucson	Statesboro, Georgia
8:00 PM EDT	Dennis (yellow card) 71'; Micaletto 90+5' (pen.)	Report	Jambga (yellow card) 38'; Wakasa (yellow card) 42'; Jones 78' (pen.); Batista (yellow card) 90+4'; Venter (yellow card) 90+8'	Stadium: Eagle Field; Attendance: 1,990; Referee: Kevin Fikar

August 21 11	Tormenta FC	1–1	Chattanooga Red Wolves	Statesboro, Georgia
8:00 PM EDT	Dennis (yellow card) 8', (goal) 28'; Phelps (yellow card) 30'	Report	Folla (yellow card) 22'; Seoane 58'; Zguro (yellow card) 70'; Hurst (yellow card) 81'	Stadium: Eagle Field; Attendance: 1,598; Referee: Adam Kilpatrick
Note: Reschedule of postponed June 8 match.

August 27 22	North Texas SC	5–0	Tormenta FC	Frisco, Texas
8:00 PM EDT	Roberts (yellow card) 17'; Reynolds 29', (yellow card) 85'; Danso 34'; Pepi 45+4' (pen.), 90+1' (pen.); Rayo 82'; Montgomery (yellow card) 89'	Report	Phelps (yellow card) 13'; Dennis (yellow card) 36'; Gómez (yellow card) 38'; Skelton (yellow card) 45+3'; Jackson (yellow card) 79'	Stadium: Toyota Stadium; Attendance: 615; Referee: Joseph Salinas

August 31 23	Tormenta FC	1–4	Richmond Kickers	Statesboro, Georgia
8:00 PM EDT	Rowe 5'; Wells (yellow card) 28'; Antley (yellow card) 57'	Report	Chin 11', 36'; Gallardo 15', (yellow card) 41', (goal) 80'	Stadium: Eagle Field; Attendance: 1,526; Referee: Alyssa Nichols

September 7 24	Forward Madison FC	1–1	Tormenta FC	Madison, Wisconsin
8:00 PM EDT	Paulo Jr. 24'	Report	Micaletto 80'	Stadium: Breese Stevens Field; Attendance: 4,215; Referee: Karen Callado

September 14 25	Tormenta FC	1–2	North Texas SC	Statesboro, Georgia
8:00 PM EDT	Antley 4', (yellow card) 45+3'; Rowe (yellow card) 19'; Micaletto (yellow card) 37'; Phelps (yellow card) 61' (yellow-red card) 72'	Report	Danso 21'; Jatta (yellow card) 43'; A. Rodriguez 45+4'	Stadium: Eagle Field; Attendance: 1,318; Referee: John Griggs

September 21 26	Lansing Ignite FC	1–1	Tormenta FC	Lansing, Michigan
7:00 PM EDT	Moon 45+1'	Report	Dennis (yellow card) 19'; Arslan (yellow card) 34'; Rowe 67'	Stadium: Cooley Law School Stadium; Attendance: 2,489; Referee: Joshua Encarnación

September 27 27	Toronto FC II	1–0	Tormenta FC	Toronto, Ontario, Canada
4:00 PM EDT	Mingo 23'; Perruzza (yellow card) 62'; Nelson (yellow card) 89'	Report	Gómez (yellow card) 24'; Micaletto (yellow card) 65'	Stadium: BMO Training Ground; Attendance: 51; Referee: Marko Kalic

October 5 28	Tormenta FC	3–1	Greenville Triumph SC	Statesboro, Georgia
8:00 PM EDT	Arslan 26', 40'; Micaletto (yellow card) 33'; Rowe (yellow card) 75'; Antley 80'	Report	Gómez 18'; Walker (yellow card) 32'; Bermudez (yellow card) 69'; Ward (yellow card) 88'	Stadium: Eagle Field; Attendance: 1,908; Referee: Chris Ruska

=== U.S. Open Cup ===
May 8, 2019 First round	Greenville Triumph SC (South Carolina)	1–0	(Georgia (U.S. state)) South Georgia Tormenta FC	Greenville, South Carolina
19:00 EDT				Stadium: Legacy Early College Field; Attendance: 1,757

== Transfers ==
=== In ===
Pos.	Player	Transferred from	Fee/notes	Date	Source

== Statistics ==
=== Appearances and goals ===
No.	Pos	Nat	Player	Total		USL1		U.S. Open Cup	
No.	Pos	Nat	Player	Apps	Goals	Apps	Goals	Apps	Goals

=== Disciplinary record ===
No.	Pos.	Name	USL1		U.S. Open Cup		Total	
No.	Pos.	Name	Booked	Sent off (straight red)	Booked	Sent off (straight red)	Booked	Sent off (straight red)
