= David Loera =

American soccer player

Personal information
- Date of birth: September 10, 1998 (age 28)
- Place of birth: Zaragoza, Spain
- Height: 5 ft 5 in (1.65 m)
- Position: Midfielder

Youth career
- 2012–2017: Orlando City

College career
Years	Team	Apps	(Gls)
2017–2019	NC State Wolfpack	57	(9)

Senior career*
Years	Team	Apps	(Gls)
2016–2017	Orlando City B	7	(0)
2018	SIMA Águilas	4	(0)
2019	North Carolina U23	0	(0)
2020–2021	Orlando City	3	(0)
2021	→ Phoenix Rising (loan)	11	(0)
2022–2023	San Antonio FC	17	(2)
2024	Lexington SC	3	(0)

International career^{‡}
2016	United States U19	3	(0)
- * Club domestic league appearances and goals as of November 21, 2024 ‡ National team caps and goals as of February 4, 2016

David Loera (born September 10, 1998) is a professional soccer player who plays as a midfielder. Born in Spain, he has represented the United States at youth level.

== Early career ==
=== Youth career ===
As a youth, Loera played with the Orlando City Development Academy team. In July 2016, Loera made his Orlando City B debut in USL, coming on as a 54th-minute substitute against Louisville City, the first player to appear for Orlando's USL affiliate while still in the academy. He made seven appearances for the team between 2016 and 2017.

=== College career ===
In February 2017, Loera signed a letter of intent to play college soccer at North Carolina State University. In three seasons at NC State, Loera started in all 57 of his appearances for the Wolfpack, scoring nine goals and adding 15 assists. Ahead of his final season, he was named to the MAC Hermann Trophy Watch List and reached No. 13 on Top Drawer Soccer's Men's National Top-100 list, the highest ranked player in the Atlantic Coast Conference.

== Club career ==
=== Orlando City ===
Ahead of the 2020 season, Loera returned to Orlando City, signing a multi-year Homegrown contract with the club. He made his professional debut on 3 October 2020 as a stoppage time substitute in a 3–1 win over New York Red Bulls.

On September 9, 2021, Loera joined Phoenix Rising of the USL Championship on loan for the rest of the season. Loera had his contract option declined by Orlando City at the end of the 2021 season.

=== San Antonio FC ===
On January 11, 2022, Loera signed with USL Championship club San Antonio FC.

=== Lexington SC ===
Loera joined USL League One club Lexington SC on January 26, 2024. He was released by Lexington following their 2024 season.

== International career ==
In 2016, Loera was called up to the United States U19 squad by head coach Brad Friedel for the Copa de Atlantico tournament. He played in all three games as the United States lost 1–0 to Spain U19, 5–0 to France U19, and 1–0 to the Canary Islands.

== Career statistics ==
=== Club ===
As of November 8, 2021

Appearances and goals by club, season and competition
Club	Season	League			Cup		Continental		Playoffs		Total	
Club	Season	Division	Apps	Goals	Apps	Goals	Apps	Goals	Apps	Goals	Apps	Goals
Orlando City B	2016	USL	2	0	—		—		—		2	0
Orlando City B	2017	USL	5	0	—		—		—		5	0
Orlando City B	Total		7	0	0	0	0	0	0	0	7	0
Orlando City	2020	MLS	2	0	—		—		0	0	2	0
Orlando City	2021	MLS	1	0	—		1 (Note: Appearances in Leagues Cup)	0	0	0	2	0
Orlando City	Total		3	0	0	0	1	0	0	0	4	0
Phoenix Rising (loan)	2021	USL Championship	11	0	—		—		—		11	0
Career total			21	0	0	0	1	0	0	0	22	0
