= Jordan Bender =

American soccer player (born 2001)

Personal information
- Date of birth: July 9, 2001 (age 25)
- Place of birth: Lake Mary, Florida, U.S.
- Height: 5 ft 9 in (1.75 m)
- Position: Attacking midfielder

Youth career
- 2015–2019: Orlando City

Senior career*
Years	Team	Apps	(Gls)
2018	SIMA Águilas	2	(0)
2019–2020	Orlando City B	19	(0)
2020–2021	Orlando City	2	(0)
2021	→ Charlotte Independence (loan)	15	(0)
2022–2023	Cape Town City	10	(0)
2024	Metta	32	(0)
2025–2026	AFC Eskilstuna	25	(4)
2026	Sarasota Paradise	10	(0)

International career^{‡}
2018	United States U17		
2020	United States U20		
- * Club domestic league appearances and goals as of November 2, 2026 ‡ National team caps and goals as of January 9, 2020

Jordan Bender (born July 9, 2001) is an American professional soccer player who plays as an attacking midfielder most recently for USL League One club Sarasota Paradise.

== Club career ==
=== Orlando City ===
Having joined the Orlando City Development Academy (DA) aged 13 and captaining the U19 team in the process, Bender signed his first professional contract with Orlando City B (OCB), Orlando City's USL League One affiliate, on November 14, 2018. In December 2019, Bender signed a Homegrown contract with Orlando City ahead of the 2020 season. In doing so he became the first Orlando player to be signed to the senior team having directly come through both the academy and OCB.

==== Charlotte Independence loan ====
On May 6, 2021, Bender joined USL Championship team Charlotte Independence on loan for the 2021 season. He made his debut on May 14, 2021, as a 77th-minute substitute in a 3–0 win over Charleston Battery. He was recalled by Orlando City on September 1 having made 15 appearances. Bender had his contract option declined at the end of the 2021 season.

=== Cape Town City ===
In July 2022, Bender signed with South African Premier Division club Cape Town City.

=== Metta ===
Bender joined Latvian club Metta in early 2024. At the end of season, Bender was released by the club.

=== AFC Eskilstuna ===
Bender played for Ettan club AFC Eskilstuna.

=== Sarasota Paradise ===
Bender signed with USL League One club Sarasota Paradise on March 26, 2026.

== International career ==
In 2017, Bender received his first call-up to the United States U16 national team during their February training camp. In January 2020, Bender was called in to the U20 camp for two friendlies against Mexico as an injury replacement for Kevin Bonilla.

== Career statistics ==
As of August 28, 2021

Club	Season	League			Cup		Playoffs		Total	
Club	Season	Division	Apps	Goals	Apps	Goals	Apps	Goals	Apps	Goals
Orlando City B	2019	USL1	16	0	—		—		16	0
Orlando City B	2020	USL1	3	0	—		—		3	0
Orlando City B	Total		19	0	0	0	0	0	19	0
Orlando City	2020	MLS	2	0	—		—		2	0
Charlotte Independence	2021	USLC	15	0	—		—		15	0
Career total			36	0	0	0	0	0	36	0
