= 2020 Orlando City SC season =

Season of American association football team

Orlando City SC
2020 season
- CEO: Alex Leitão
- Manager: Óscar Pareja
- Stadium: Exploria Stadium
- MLS: Conference: 4th Overall: 5th
- MLS Cup Playoffs: Conference Semifinals
- U.S. Open Cup: Canceled
- MLS is Back Tournament: Runners-up
- Top goalscorer: League: Chris Mueller (10); All: Chris Mueller (10)
- Biggest win: ORL 4–1 CHI (Sept. 19); ORL 4–1 ATL (Oct. 28)
- Biggest defeat: ORL 1–3 NE (Nov. 29)
Home colors	Away colors

The 2020 Orlando City SC season was the club's 10th season of existence in Orlando and sixth season as a Major League Soccer franchise, the top-flight league in the United States soccer league system. Due to the COVID-19 pandemic, the U.S. Open Cup was canceled.

== Season review ==
=== Pre-season ===
On October 7, 2019, one day after the final game of the 2019 season, Orlando City parted ways with head coach James O'Connor.

With the addition of Nashville SC and Inter Miami CF in 2020, MLS held an Expansion Draft on November 19, 2019. Orlando City had 13 players exposed. None were taken.

On November 21, 2019, it was announced that a total of 14 players would not return either because their contract had expired, they had their contract option declined or, in the case of Danilo Acosta, they returned to their parent club after their loan expired. Orlando City had an option to buy Acosta at the end of the loan but declined. However, Ruan had his purchase option exercised following his loan in 2019. Another notable departure was Cristian Higuita who had been the sole remaining member of the team's inaugural MLS roster in 2015 and departed as the club's leading appearance maker with 108 across all competitions. Having initially had their options declined, Uri Rosell, Alex DeJohn and Mason Stajduhar all later renegotiated new contracts with Orlando.

On December 4, 2019, Óscar Pareja was announced as Orlando City's new head coach. Pareja had previously worked with Orlando's VP of soccer operations Luiz Muzzi at FC Dallas.

Having emphasized the importance Homegrown players the previous offseason, Orlando signed the sixth and seventh Homegrown players in club history in December, signing David Loera following his junior year at NC State and Jordan Bender from USL affiliate Orlando City B.

The team also did a significant amount of recruiting in South America, bringing in Colombian midfielder Andrés Perea, Argentine defender Rodrigo Schlegel and Brazilian defender Antônio Carlos all on one-year loans from Atlético Nacional, Racing Club and Palmeiras respectively while Brazilian midfielder Júnior Urso joined permanently from Corinthians. Peruvian international goalkeeper Pedro Gallese also joined on a free having last played for Alianza Lima, on loan from Veracruz.

On January 9, Orlando made five selections in the 2020 MLS SuperDraft including one in the first round. Fifth-overall pick Daryl Dike was automatically signed due to his Generation Adidas status while Joey DeZart was later given a contract. Austin Aviza and Nick O'Callaghan were signed to Orlando City B.

On January 17, Orlando officially opened the new Orlando City SC Training Ground at Osceola Heritage Park.

=== February ===
Orlando's sixth MLS campaign began at home to Real Salt Lake on February 29, a repeat of the 2016 season opener. Just like 2016, the game once again finished level, this time goalless as debutant goalkeeper Pedro Gallese kept Orlando's first clean sheet in nine games stretching back to the previous season. The result meant Orlando remained unbeaten on matchday one since joining MLS. The game was also notable for the substitute appearance of on loan Andrés Perea who became the first person born in the 21st century to play for Orlando City SC.

=== March ===
March 7 saw Orlando's first away game of 2020. It ended in a 2–1 defeat to Colorado Rapids as Drew Moor headed a 90th-minute winner from a corner after substitute Chris Mueller had scored the team's first goal of the season to tie up the game in the 82nd minute. It was the first time Orlando had lost to Colorado in the two teams' six meetings.

=== COVID-19 pandemic ===
On March 12 it was announced that the 2020 Major League Soccer season had been temporarily suspended for 30 days on the advice of public health authorities due to the COVID-19 pandemic. With the situation developing, the suspension was extended until at least June 8. On May 6, MLS allowed voluntary individual workouts on outdoor fields for the first time since the suspension. Every Orlando City player opted to train at the team's Kissimmee training facility.

=== MLS is Back Tournament ===
On June 10, MLS announced a return to play via a one-off MLS is Back Tournament. The competition ran from July 8 to August 11 at the ESPN Wide World of Sports Complex. Orlando's first match was the tournament opener, scheduled against newly created Florida rivals Inter Miami CF. Orlando won the game 2–1 after trailing thanks to goals from Mueller with his second goal of the season and then a 90+7-minute winner from captain Nani in his first appearance of the year. In the second game Mueller scored twice in the opening ten minutes as Orlando earned back to back MLS wins for the first time since May 2018, running out 3–1 winners over New York City FC with Tesho Akindele also scoring his first goal of the season during the match. The result, coupled with Philadelphia Union beating Inter Miami later that evening, meant Orlando sealed qualification to the knockout round with a game to spare. A 1–1 draw against similarly already-qualified Philadelphia in the final group game, in which Mauricio Pereyra scored his first goal for the club, ensured Orlando finished top of Group A on goal difference.

Orlando faced Montreal Impact, who qualified as one of the best third-place teams, in the round of 16. Orlando won 1–0, earning their first shutout of the tournament and second of the season. The team progressed to the semi-final stage following a penalty shootout win over Los Angeles FC with the teams tied 1–1 after 90 minutes. Nani had a penalty saved by Kenneth Vermeer in the second half before Bradley Wright-Phillips opened the scoring shortly after. João Moutinho forced the shootout, scoring an equalizer against his former club off a Nani corner in the 90th minute, his first goal for Orlando City. Nani went on to score the decisive penalty in the 5–4 shootout victory with every Orlando player scoring their penalty. For the semi-final, Orlando City matched up against Minnesota United FC, coached by Adrian Heath who had led Orlando City's USL predecessor to two USL Pro titles and had remained unbeaten against the Lions in three previous meetings since his 2016 sacking. However, a first half Nani brace and a second half Benji Michel stoppage time goal earned Orlando a 3–1 win and booked their place in the final. Portland Timbers won the final 2–1. Nani, João Moutinho and Ruan were all later named to the tournament Best XI.

=== August ===
On August 19, following the return of the MLS regular season in home markets, Orlando City announced that all three phase one games at Exploria Stadium would be open to fans at a reduced capacity and that face coverings would be mandatory for those in attendance. They were one of only five teams (with Dallas, Montreal, Real Salt Lake and Sporting KC) to confirm fans could attend during phase one. Phase one consisted of Orlando playing three regional opponents both home and away: Inter Miami CF, Nashville SC and Atlanta United FC. The first of these was a 3–2 defeat away to Inter Miami on August 22, the new expansion franchise's first home match and subsequently their first victory having lost all five of their previous matches. It was also notable for the first senior career goal scored by Orlando's first-round rookie Daryl Dike. In the following game, Dike scored another two goals as Orlando won 3–1 in their first meeting with Nashville SC. The game was the first to kick off on August 26, with the other ten teams scheduled to play that evening later deciding to postpone in solidarity with sports teams from other leagues, including the NBA, WNBA and MLB, who refused to play in protest following the shooting of Jacob Blake on August 23. Three days later, Orlando traveled to Atlanta and earned their first ever win over their rivals when Urso opened the scoring with his first goal for the club. Mueller doubled Orlando's lead before the halftime break and while Brooks Lennon halved the lead in the 83rd minute, Nani immediately restored the cushion to help seal a 3–1 victory.

=== September ===
On September 2, Orlando traveled to Nashville, this time playing out a 1–1 draw with the expansion side when Nashville DP Randall Leal scored his first goal for the club to rescue a point for the hosts following Michel's first half rocket from outside the box which had opened the scoring. On September 5, Orlando's second matchup with Atlanta inside a week ended in a 1–1 draw after Adam Jahn scored a stoppage time equalizer. After playing five games in a 15-day stretch, Orlando had a full week break before the final phase one match on September 12: Miami's first visit to Exploria Stadium. Orlando won 2–1, ending Miami's club-record three game unbeaten streak in the process. The game included a dramatic series of officiating calls whereby referee Ismail Elfath awarded a penalty to Miami after consulting the video screen, sending Rodrigo Schlegel off for second yellow card on Julián Carranza in the process before both were rescinded after officials realized Carranza was offside, negating the play. With the conclusion of the phase one home and away series, Orlando hosted Chicago Fire FC on September 19, winning 4–1 and equaling the club record streak of six games unbeaten in regular season MLS play in the process. The record was broken on September 23 when Orlando beat Sporting Kansas City 2–1 thanks to first half goals from Akindele and Michel. Johnny Russell halved the home team's deficit early in the second half but the Lions held out to also maintain the club's 100% win record when leading by two goals in MLS history. On September 27, Pareja coached against FC Dallas for the first time since ending his five-year head coaching spell with the Texas club in November 2018. The game finished goalless with Orlando playing down a man from the 69th minute after Sebas Méndez became the first Lion to be sent off in 2020.

=== October ===
Orlando's first game of October saw the Lions play New York Red Bulls for the first time in 2020, a 3–1 home win that saw the first goal for the club by Antônio Carlos and the professional debut of homegrown player David Loera. With Gallese away on international duty, Brian Rowe made his first appearance of the season on October 7 as Orlando stretched the unbeaten run to 10 matches after a heavily rotated team played out a goalless draw away to Atlanta United. Orlando's game against Columbus Crew scheduled for October 11, which would have seen the Lions play an Eastern Conference team above them in the standings for the first time on the year, was postponed following two confirmed cases of COVID-19 among Columbus staff: the third MLS match of the week forced into a postponement. It was later rescheduled for November 4. Orlando acquired winger Alexander Alvarado on loan from Ecuadorian club Aucas on October 13, trading for an additional international roster slot from Montreal Impact in order to add him to the roster. On October 14, Orlando drew 1–1 with New York City FC. The result kept Orlando in fourth place in both the Eastern Conference and Supporters' Shield standings. Homegrown midfielder Jordan Bender made his senior debut for the club as a substitute during the match. Despite conceding a 90+5-minute equalizer in a 1–1 draw with New York Red Bulls earlier in the evening, Orlando City's first MLS playoff berth in club history was confirmed on October 18 with a combination of the tie and Toronto FC later beating Atlanta United 1–0 thanks to an 89th-minute winner by Pablo Piatti. The club record unbeaten streak ended at 12 matches on October 24 as Orlando lost to Inter Miami CF, the last team to have beaten the Lions prior to the start of the streak on August 22. This time the score was 2–1 with Leandro González Pírez scoring a 90th-minute winner for the expansion side. August transfer Matheus Aiás made his club debut in the game as a stoppage time substitute. Orlando's final game of October was a 4–1 win over Atlanta, the fourth meeting between the two teams on the season with the Lions remaining unbeaten in the series. It marked the first time Orlando beat Atlanta at home. Loanee Alexander Alvarado made his club debut in the game as a 79th-minute substitute while Matheus Aiás scored his first goal for Orlando.

=== November ===
Orlando earned their first regular season shutout win of the season on November 1, beating Montreal Impact 1–0 at the Canadian side's temporary designated home stadium Red Bull Arena, a repeat of the scoreline when the team's met in the MLS is Back Tournament round of 16. Dike's seventh goal of the season proved the difference and took him level with Nani as the team's second-highest goalscorer on the season. On November 5, Orlando finally played the rescheduled game against Columbus Crew - the teams entered the game level on points with Columbus ahead in third on the number of wins tiebreaker. Orlando dominated the first half and led at half-time as Chris Mueller hit double figures for goals for the first time in his professional career. However, a seemingly innocuous foul was controversially upgraded to a red card after VAR review which saw Nani sent off in the 52nd minute. The red card was rescinded by the Independent Review Panel on November 7. Columbus capitalized on the swing in momentum, Harrison Afful scoring an equalizer four minutes later. Despite the numerical disadvantage, Orlando weathered the storm and found a winning goal in the 84th minute through Benji Michel. The victory guaranteed Orlando a top-four finish in the Eastern Conference and home field advantage in the first round of the playoffs as a result.

==== Decision Day ====
Having moved up to third place in the Eastern Conference with the victory over Columbus, Orlando just needed to avoid defeat against Nashville SC in the final game of the season to retain the #3 seed for the playoffs. The Lions, who were unbeaten at home on the season coming into the game, took the lead early in the first half through Dike but were pegged back and went into half-time tied at 1–1. Having re-established the lead with a Nani freekick on the hour mark, Nashville turned the game around late on with goals in the 88th and 90+3rd minute to win 3–2, handing Orlando their only home loss of the regular season. Orlando dropped down to the #4 seed on the total wins tiebreaker, finishing level on points with Columbus following the Crew's win over Atlanta.

=== Playoffs ===
Having finished in fourth-place in the Eastern Conference, Orlando City were positioned to play #5 seed New York City FC in the first round of the playoffs on November 21 having avoided the play-in round and clinched home-field advantage for the first round. Orlando took an early lead in the 5th minute through a Nani penalty but New York responded within three minutes, equalizing through a Maxime Chanot header. Despite the franctic pace to the game, it remained 1–1. Tensions boiled over in the 87th minute when Ruan, having been pushed by Gary Mackay-Steven while on the ground, lashed out and kicked at Mackay-Steven resulting in a red card. Despite the numerical disadvantage during extra-time, Orlando held on to take the game to a penalty shootout. Goalkeeper Gallese made a stop on Maximiliano Moralez's opener and thought he had made the winning save on New York's fifth attempt after Orlando had successfully converted all of their first four. However a VAR review deemed Gallese had left his goal line early which resulted in his second yellow card having been booked in extra-time for time wasting. Unable to make a substitution in a shootout, on loan defender Rodrigo Schlegel volunteered to finish the shootout as an emergency goalkeeper. With Nani's penalty saved by Sean Johnson to take the shootout into sudden death, Schlegel eventually made a decisive save on Guðmundur Þórarinsson teeing up Benji Michel to net the final penalty to lift Orlando to a 6–5 victory. Between the VAR review, the sending off, confusion around Orlando's attempt to substitute on backup goalkeeper Brian Rowe and the referee mistakenly signaling the end of the shootout following Schlegel's save with the scores level at 5–5, the shootout took 22 minutes to complete. As a result of the debacle, which gained international attention, MLS suspended referee Allen Chapman and the rest of the officiating crew for the remainder of the playoffs. Orlando's season was ended by #8 seed New England Revolution on November 29, a 3–1 conference semi-final defeat compounded by yet another red card for an Orlando player, this time Pereyra. New England jumped out to a two-goal lead through a Carles Gil penalty and Gustavo Bou strike. Urso halved the deficit before half-time but Orlando, who played down a man from the 60th minute onwards, couldn't find an equalizer and even saw a Nani penalty saved before the Revs eventually found a third goal in the 86th minute to kill off any hopes of a late Orlando comeback.

== Roster ==
Last updated on October 13, 2020

No.	Nationality	Name	Position(s)	Date of birth (age)	Previous club	Notes
Goalkeepers
1	(Peru)	Pedro Gallese	GK	February 23, 1990 (aged 30)	(Mexico) Veracruz	INT
23	(United States)	Brian Rowe	GK	November 16, 1988 (aged 31)	(Canada) Vancouver Whitecaps FC	–
31	(United States)	Mason Stajduhar	GK	December 2, 1997 (aged 22)	(United States) Orlando City U-23	HGP
Defenders
2	(Brazil)	Ruan	RB	May 29, 1995 (aged 24)	(Brazil) Barra da Tijuca	INT
3	(United States)	Alex DeJohn	CB	May 10, 1991 (aged 28)	(Sweden) Dalkurd FF	–
4	(Portugal)	João Moutinho	LB	January 12, 1998 (aged 22)	(United States) Los Angeles FC	GA
6	(Sweden)	Robin Jansson	CB	November 15, 1991 (aged 28)	(Sweden) AIK	–
15	(Argentina)	Rodrigo Schlegel	CB	April 3, 1997 (aged 22)	(Argentina) Racing Club	INT, Loan in
24	(United States)	Kyle Smith	RB	January 9, 1992 (aged 28)	(United States) Louisville City	–
25	(Brazil)	Antônio Carlos	CB	March 7, 1993 (aged 26)	(Brazil) Palmeiras	INT, Loan in
26	(United States)	Michael Halliday	RB	January 22, 2003 (aged 17)	(United States) Orlando City B	HGP
27	(Canada)	Kamal Miller	CB	May 16, 1997 (aged 22)	(United States) Syracuse Orange	–
Midfielders
8	(Ecuador)	Sebas Méndez	DM	April 26, 1997 (aged 22)	(Ecuador) Independiente del Valle	–
10	(Uruguay)	Mauricio Pereyra	AM	March 15, 1990 (aged 29)	(Russia) FC Krasnodar	DP, INT
11	(Brazil)	Júnior Urso	CM	March 10, 1989 (aged 30)	(Brazil) Corinthians	INT
20	(Spain)	Uri Rosell	DM	July 7, 1992 (aged 27)	(Portugal) Sporting CP	–
21	(Colombia)	Andrés Perea	CM	November 14, 2000 (aged 19)	(Colombia) Atlético Nacional	Loan in
30	(United States)	David Loera	AM	September 10, 1998 (aged 21)	(United States) NC State Wolfpack	HGP
33	(United States)	Jordan Bender	CM	July 9, 2001 (aged 18)	(United States) Orlando City B	HGP
34	(Jamaica)	Joey DeZart	DM	June 9, 1998 (aged 21)	(United States) Wake Forest Demon Deacons	–
Forwards
9	(United States)	Chris Mueller	RW	August 29, 1996 (aged 23)	(United States) Wisconsin Badgers	–
13	(Canada)	Tesho Akindele	CF	March 31, 1992 (aged 27)	(United States) FC Dallas	–
14	(United States)	Dom Dwyer	CF	July 30, 1990 (aged 29)	(United States) Sporting KC	DP
17	(Portugal)	Nani	LW	November 17, 1986 (aged 33)	(Portugal) Sporting CP	DP, INT
18	(United States)	Daryl Dike	CF	June 3, 2000 (aged 19)	(United States) Virginia Cavaliers	GA
19	(United States)	Benji Michel	RW	October 23, 1997 (aged 22)	(United States) Portland Pilots	HGP
22	(Ecuador)	Alexander Alvarado	LW	April 21, 1999 (aged 20)	(Ecuador) Aucas	INT, Loan in
77	(Brazil)	Robinho	LW	January 19, 1995 (aged 25)	(United States) Columbus Crew	–
99	(Brazil)	Matheus Aiás	CF	December 30, 1996 (aged 23)	(England) Watford	INT

== Staff ==
Executive
Majority owner and chairman	(Brazil) Flávio Augusto da Silva
Chief executive officer	(Brazil) Alex Leitão
Executive VP of soccer operations	(Brazil) Luiz Muzzi
Coaching staff
Head coach	(Colombia) Óscar Pareja
Assistant coach	(Argentina) Josema Bazán
Assistant coach	(Mexico) Diego Torres Ortiz
Strength and conditioning coach	(Argentina) Fabian Bazán
Goalkeeping coach	(Venezuela) César Baena

== Competitions ==
=== Friendlies ===
Orlando City reported for the start of preseason at their new training facility on January 20 before a closed-door friendly against Stetson University five days later. The team traveled to Cancún, Mexico, for a nine-day training camp beginning January 27 that was supposed to feature games against Columbus Crew and third-tier Mexican team Inter Playa although Columbus later pulled out. The team returned to Orlando for further friendlies against Montreal Impact, Tampa Bay Rowdies, D.C. United, reigning Icelandic champions KR Reykjavík and San Antonio FC with both the Montreal and KR games open to the public at Exploria Stadium. The KR match was the first time since the 2016 game against Bahia that Orlando had hosted foreign opposition in preseason.

January 25	Orlando City	3–0	Stetson Hatters	Kissimmee, Florida
9:00 am	Monticelli; Bender; Dike	Report		Stadium: Orlando City Training Ground
Note: Behind-closed-doors

February 1	Orlando City	Canceled	Columbus Crew	Cancún, Mexico
11:00 am				Stadium: Pure Mareazul Riviera Maya
Note: Columbus pulled out citing weather and field conditions.

February 4	Inter Playa	0–2	Orlando City	Cancún, Mexico
9:00 am		Report	Nani; Dwyer	Stadium: Pure Mareazul Riviera Maya

February 8	Orlando City	1–0	Montreal Impact	Orlando, Florida
6:00 pm	Nani 39'	Report		Stadium: Exploria Stadium

February 12	Orlando City	2–1	Tampa Bay Rowdies	Orlando, Florida
	Bender 70'; Urso 76'	Report	Murphy 49'	Stadium: Exploria Stadium
Note: Behind-closed-doors

February 15	Orlando City	0–1	D.C. United	Tampa, Florida
		Report	Gamble 77'	Stadium: Corbett Soccer Stadium

February 18	Orlando City	3–1	KR Reykjavík	Orlando, Florida
6:00 pm	Nani 2', 42'; Michel 8'	Report	Sævarsson 22'	Stadium: Exploria Stadium

February 21	Orlando City	2–1	San Antonio FC	Orlando, Florida
	Akindele 28'; Mueller 62'	Report	Montgomery 42'	Stadium: Exploria Stadium
Note: Behind-closed-doors

=== Major League Soccer ===
All times in regular season on Eastern Daylight Time (UTC-04:00) except where otherwise noted.

Outside of the club, Inter Miami CF and Nashville SC joined the league as expansion franchises, bringing the total number of MLS clubs to 26. Orlando were due to play Miami for the first time at home on July 10 with the away tie on August 20. Because Nashville were placed in the Western Conference the teams were only scheduled meet once in regular-season league play in 2020, in Orlando on September 12. Nashville were ultimately relocated to the Eastern Conference ahead of the MLS is Back Tournament for the remainder of season.

Per the original 34-game schedule, it meant that for the first time Orlando would not play every team in MLS. They were still scheduled to play every Eastern Conference opponent both home and away, and all but three Western Conference opponents once. The three teams Orlando were not scheduled face in regular-season league play in 2020 were Los Angeles FC, San Jose Earthquakes and Seattle Sounders FC.

Results summary

Overall								Home						Away					
Pld	W	D	L	GF	GA	GD	Pts	W	D	L	GF	GA	GD	W	D	L	GF	GA	GD
23	11	8	4	40	25	+15	41	7	3	1	24	12	+12	4	5	3	16	13	+3

Last updated: November 8, 2020.
Source: Match reports

Round	1	2	3	4	5	6	7	8	9	10	11	12	13	14	15	16	17	18	19	20	21	22	23
Stadium	H	A	N (Note: MLS is Back Tournament was held inside a bubble at the ESPN Wide World of Sports Complex with group stage points counting towards the 2020 regular season total.)	N	N	A	H	A	A	H	H	H	A	A	H	A	H	A	A	H	A	H	H
Result	D	L	W	W	D	L	W	W	D	D	W	W	W	D	W	D	D	D	L	W	W	W	L
Position (Note: ORL's position at the end of the matchweek, not their match.)	6	9	9	3	3	8	4	4	3	4	4	3	2	4	3	4	4	4	4	4	4	3	4

Updated to match(es) played on November 8, 2020. Source: Match reports
A = Away; H = Home; N = Neutral; W = Win; D = Draw; L = Loss

Results
Regular schedule

February 29 1	Orlando City	0–0	Real Salt Lake	Orlando, Florida
6:00 pm	Pereyra (yellow card) 75'	Report	Glad (yellow card) 41'	Stadium: Exploria Stadium; Attendance: 25,527; Referee: Rubiel Vazquez

March 7 2	Colorado Rapids	2–1	Orlando City	Commerce City, Colorado
9:00 pm	Namli (yellow card) 24', (goal) 64'; Moor (yellow card) 55', (goal) 90'; Acosta (yellow card) 76'	Report	Moutinho (yellow card) 15'; Schlegel (yellow card) 81'; Mueller 82'	Stadium: Dick's Sporting Goods Park; Attendance: 13,062; Referee: Joe Dickerson

MLS is Back Tournament

The three group stage matches at the MLS is Back Tournament counted towards the MLS regular season standings.

Phase 1 schedule

With the season disrupted by the COVID-19 pandemic two games in, Orlando did not return to in-market play until August 22 with a six-game home and away series against Inter Miami, Nashville SC and Atlanta United.

August 22 6	Inter Miami CF	3–2	Orlando City	Fort Lauderdale, Florida
8:00 pm	Carranza 12', 23', (yellow card) 66'; Pizarro 49'; Sweat (yellow card) 53'; Pellegrini (yellow card) 62'; Shea (yellow card) 90'	Report	Dike 18'; Ruan (yellow card) 31'; Nani 80'	Stadium: Inter Miami CF Stadium; Attendance: Behind-closed-doors; Referee: Armando Villarreal

August 26 7	Orlando City	3–1	Nashville SC	Orlando, Florida
7:30 pm	Mueller 21'; Moutinho (yellow card) 44'; Dike 52', 71'; Michel (yellow card) 84'	Report	Romney 15'; Anibaba (yellow card) 43'; Johnston (yellow card) 90+5'	Stadium: Exploria Stadium; Attendance: 3,003; Referee: Marcos De Oliveira

August 29 8	Atlanta United FC	1–3	Orlando City	Atlanta, Georgia
3:30 pm	Lennon 83'	Report	Urso 13'; Mueller 35'; Smith (yellow card) 45+1'; Perea (yellow card) 84'; Nani 86'; Urso (yellow card) 87'; Carlos (yellow card) 88'; Ruan (yellow card) 90+9'	Stadium: Mercedes-Benz Stadium; Attendance: Behind-closed-doors; Referee: Nima Saghafi

September 2 9	Nashville SC	1–1	Orlando City	Nashville, Tennessee
8:30 pm	Leal 47'	Report	Michel 17'	Stadium: Nissan Stadium; Attendance: Behind-closed-doors; Referee: Jair Marrufo

September 5 10	Orlando City	1–1	Atlanta United FC	Orlando, Florida
7:30 pm	Michel 45+1'; Méndez (yellow card) 64'	Report	Escobar (yellow card) 39'; Torres (yellow card) 41'; Larentowicz (yellow card) 70'; Lennon (yellow card) 78'; Jahn 90+2'	Stadium: Exploria Stadium; Attendance: 4,242; Referee: Victor Rivas

September 12 11	Orlando City	2–1	Inter Miami CF	Orlando, Florida
7:30 pm	Reyes 34' (o.g.); Schlegel (yellow card) 45'; Pereyra (yellow card) 50', (goal) 69'	Report	Reyes (yellow card) 41'; Pizarro (yellow card) 45+1'; Robinson (yellow card) 53'; Shea 65'; Matuidi (yellow card) 89'	Stadium: Exploria Stadium; Attendance: 4,808; Referee: Ismail Elfath

Rest of season schedule

September 19 12	Orlando City	4–1	Chicago Fire FC	Orlando, Florida
7:30 pm	Mueller 11'; Nani 24'; Méndez (yellow card) 66'; Urso 78'; Michel 90+5'	Report	Pineda (yellow card) 15'; Berić 48' (pen.); Sekulić (yellow card) 60'; Calvo (yellow card) 76'; Bronico (yellow card) 86'	Stadium: Exploria Stadium; Referee: Nima Saghafi

September 23 13	Sporting Kansas City	1–2	Orlando City	Kansas City, Kansas
7:30 pm	Besler (yellow card) 24'; Shelton (yellow card) 51'; Russell 53'; Kinda (yellow card) 85'	Report	Schlegel (yellow card) 9'; Akindele 36'; Michel 38'; Pereyra (yellow card) 77'; Perea (yellow card) 78'	Stadium: Children's Mercy Park; Referee: Victor Rivas

September 27 14	FC Dallas	0–0	Orlando City	Frisco, Texas
8:30 pm	Ricaurte (yellow card) 45+3'; Jara (yellow card) 57'; Santos (yellow card) 87'	Report	Méndez (yellow card) 64' (yellow-red card) 69'; Nani (yellow card) 90+7'	Stadium: Toyota Stadium; Attendance: 3,113; Referee: Ramy Touchan

October 3 15	Orlando City	3–1	New York Red Bulls	Orlando, Florida
4:00 pm	Pereyra (yellow card) 15'; Dike 24'; Urso 50'; Carlos 90+5'	Report	Egbo (yellow card) 14'; Valot 54'	Stadium: Exploria Stadium; Attendance: 3,184; Referee: Fotis Bazakos

October 7 16	Atlanta United FC	0–0	Orlando City	Atlanta, Georgia
7:00 pm	Escobar (yellow card) 36'; Adams (yellow card) 50'; Robinson (yellow card) 90'	Report	Miller (yellow card) 77'; Schlegel (yellow card) 81'	Stadium: Mercedes-Benz Stadium; Attendance: Behind-closed-doors; Referee: Rubiel Vazquez

October 11	Orlando City	P–P	Columbus Crew	Orlando, Florida
7:30 pm				Stadium: Exploria Stadium
Note: Postponed due to confirmed COVID-19 cases

October 14 17	Orlando City	1–1	New York City FC	Orlando, Florida
7:30 pm	Carlos (yellow card) 3'; Mueller 18'; Jansson (yellow card) 37'; Miller (yellow card) 53'	Report	Ring (yellow card) 5'; Parks 43', (yellow card) 82'; Tinnerholm (yellow card) 45+5'	Stadium: Exploria Stadium; Attendance: 2,745; Referee: Silviu Petrescu

October 18 18	New York Red Bulls	1–1	Orlando City	Harrison, New Jersey
7:00 pm	Valot (yellow card) 90+1'; White 90+5'	Report	Miller (yellow card) 24'; Urso (yellow card) 36'; Nani 56' (pen.), (yellow card) 90+4'	Stadium: Red Bull Arena; Attendance: Behind-closed-doors; Referee: Drew Fischer

October 24 19	Inter Miami CF	2–1	Orlando City	Fort Lauderdale, Florida
3:30 pm	Pírez (yellow card) 7', (goal) 90'; Pizarro (yellow card) 23'; Jansson 45' (o.g.); Reyes (yellow card) 79'; Agudelo (yellow card) 90+4'; McCarthy (yellow card) 90+6'	Report	Dike 12'; Urso (yellow card) 62'; Ruan (yellow card) 85'; Nani (yellow card) 90+3'	Stadium: Inter Miami CF Stadium; Attendance: 2,216; Referee: Allen Chapman

October 28 20	Orlando City	4–1	Atlanta United FC	Orlando, Florida
7:30 pm	Dike 29'; Mueller 45+2'; Akindele 60'; Michel (yellow card) 88'; Matheus 90+2'	Report	Meza (yellow card) 45+1'; Remedi (yellow card) 81'; Torres 87'; Adams (yellow card) 90+1'	Stadium: Exploria Stadium; Attendance: 3,495; Referee: Alex Chilowicz

November 1 21	Montreal Impact	0–1	Orlando City	Harrison, New Jersey
7:30 pm		Report	Dike 39'; Smith (yellow card) 51'	Stadium: Red Bull Arena; Attendance: Behind-closed-doors; Referee: Robert Sibiga
Note: Montreal Impact used Red Bull Arena as a host venue due to travel restrictions in Canada

November 4 22	Orlando City	2–1	Columbus Crew	Orlando, Florida
7:30 pm	Mueller 27'; Nani (red card) 52'; Jansson (yellow card) 56'; Pereyra (yellow card) 64'; Michel 84'; Gallese (yellow card) 90+4'	Report	Afful 56'; Santos (yellow card) 81'	Stadium: Exploria Stadium; Attendance: 3,764; Referee: Ramy Touchan
Note: Rescheduled from October 11. Nani's red card was later rescinded by the Independent Review Panel.

November 8 23	Orlando City	2–3	Nashville SC	Orlando, Florida
3:30 pm	Dike 4'; Perea (yellow card) 17'; Nani 61'	Report	Lovitz 20'; Jones (yellow card) 28'; Godoy (yellow card) 29'; McCarty (yellow card) 37'; Mukhtar 88'; Cádiz 90+3'	Stadium: Exploria Stadium; Referee: David Gantar

==== Standings ====
Eastern Conference table

Pos	Team	Pld	W	L	T	GF	GA	GD	Pts	PPG	
2	Toronto FC (Note: Canadian clubs could not qualify for the 2021 CONCACAF Champions League through the MLS regular season or playoffs.)	23	13	5	5	33	26	+7	44	1.91	Qualification for the first round and the CONCACAF Champions League (Note: As 2020 Canadian Championship finalists (awarded by Canada Soccer))
3	Columbus Crew SC (C)	23	12	6	5	36	21	+15	41	1.78	Qualification for the first round and the CONCACAF Champions League (Note: As MLS Cup 2020 champions)
4	Orlando City SC	23	11	4	8	40	25	+15	41	1.78	Qualification for the first round and the Leagues Cup
5	New York City FC	23	12	8	3	37	25	+12	39	1.70	Qualification for the first round and the Leagues Cup
6	New York Red Bulls	23	9	9	5	29	31	−2	32	1.39	Qualification for the first round

Source: MLS
Rules for classification: 1) points per game; 2) total wins per match played; 3) total goal differential per match played; 4) total goals scored per match played; 5) fewest disciplinary points per match played; 6) away goal differential per away match played; 7) away goals scored per away match played; 8) home goal differential per home match played; 9) home goals scored per home match played; 10) coin toss or drawing of lots.
(C) Champions
Notes:

Overall table

2020 MLS overall standings
Pos	Team	Pld	W	L	T	GF	GA	GD	Pts	PPG	
3	Sporting Kansas City	21	12	6	3	38	25	+13	39	1.86	Qualification for the Leagues Cup (Note: As first place in Western Conference (MLS1))
4	Columbus Crew SC (C)	23	12	6	5	36	21	+15	41	1.78	Qualification for the CONCACAF Champions League (Note: As MLS Cup 2020 champions (USA1))
5	Orlando City SC	23	11	4	8	40	25	+15	41	1.78	Qualification for the Leagues Cup (Note: As fourth place in Eastern Conference (MLS2))
6	Seattle Sounders FC	22	11	5	6	44	23	+21	39	1.77	Qualification for the Leagues Cup (Note: As second place in Western Conference (MLS3))
7	New York City FC	23	12	8	3	37	25	+12	39	1.70	Qualification for the Leagues Cup (Note: As fifth place in Eastern Conference (MLS4))

Source: MLS
Rules for classification: 1) points per game; 2) total wins per match played; 3) total goal differential per match played; 4) total goals scored per match played; 5) fewest disciplinary points per match played; 6) away goal differential per away match played; 7) away goals scored per away match played; 8) home goal differential per home match played; 9) home goals scored per home match played; 10) coin toss or drawing of lots.
(C) Champions

=== MLS Cup Playoffs ===
November 21 First round	#4 Orlando City	1–1 (a.e.t.) (6–5 p)	#5 New York City FC	Orlando, Florida
12:00 pm	Nani 5' (pen.); Carlos (yellow card) 71'; Ruan (yellow card) 77' (red card) 87'; Jansson (yellow card) 90+4'; Perea (yellow card) 90+6'; Gallese (yellow card) 103' (yellow-red card) PSO	Report	Chanot 8'; Castellanos (yellow card) 70'; Mackay-Steven (yellow card) 88'; Ibeagha (yellow card) 120+2'	Stadium: Exploria Stadium; Attendance: 6,250; Referee: Allen Chapman
	Penalties
	Akindele (penalty scored); Perea (penalty scored); Carlos (penalty scored); Urso (penalty scored); Nani (penalty missed); Jansson (penalty scored); Michel (penalty scored)		(penalty missed) Moralez; (penalty scored) Medina; (penalty scored) Rocha; (penalty scored) Tajouri-Shradi; (penalty scored) Castellanos; (penalty scored) Acevedo; (penalty missed) Þórarinsson

November 29 Conf. semi-final	#4 Orlando City	1–3	#8 New England Revolution	Orlando, Florida
3:00 pm	Urso 33', (yellow card) 75'; Carlos (yellow card) 47'; Dike (yellow card) 53'; Pereyra (red card) 60'; Nani (yellow card) 62'	Report	Gil 17' (pen.); Bou 25', 86'; Buksa (yellow card) 28'	Stadium: Exploria Stadium; Attendance: 6,250; Referee: Alex Chilowicz

=== MLS is Back Tournament ===
A one-off World Cup style tournament featuring all 26 MLS teams (later reduced to 24), the MLS is Back Tournament consisted of six groups with each team playing three group matches. The top two teams from each group along with the four best third-place teams moved on to the knockout stage, beginning with the round of 16. The draw for the group stage took place on June 11 with Orlando City placed as the top seed A1 in Group A as the designated host. Inter Miami CF were predetermined as A2 prior to the draw taking place in order to make the first meeting between the two teams the tournament opener. New York City FC and Nashville SC were randomly drawn as the two other group stage opponents. Nashville later withdrew from the tournament after nine players tested positive for COVID-19. Philadelphia Union replaced them as Orlando's final group stage opponent. Points collected during the group stage were counted towards the 2020 regular season standings.

Group stage

July 8 Group stage	Orlando City	2–1	Inter Miami CF	Orlando, Florida
8:00 pm	Moutinho (yellow card) 38'; Mueller 70'; Méndez (yellow card) 87'; Nani 90+7'; Rosell (yellow card) 90+10'	Report	Sweat (yellow card) 40'; Agudelo 47'; Carranza (yellow card) 84'	Stadium: ESPN Wide World of Sports Complex; Attendance: Behind-closed-doors; Referee: Rubiel Vazquez

July 14 Group stage	New York City FC	1–3	Orlando City	Orlando, Florida
8:00 pm	Castellanos (yellow card) 18'; Sands (yellow card) 37'; Medina 38'; Ring (yellow card) 52'	Report	Mueller 4', 10'; Jansson (yellow card) 22'; Moutinho (yellow card) 56'; Gallese (yellow card) 73'; Pereyra (yellow card) 79'; Akindele 81'	Stadium: ESPN Wide World of Sports Complex; Attendance: Behind-closed-doors; Referee: Robert Sibiga
Note: Jansson's yellow card was later rescinded by the Independent Review Panel

July 20 Group stage	Philadelphia Union	1–1	Orlando City	Orlando, Florida
8:00 pm	Bedoya (yellow card) 56'; Ilsinho 68'; Glesnes (yellow card) 80'	Report	Rosell (yellow card) 67'; Pereyra 70'; Ruan (yellow card) 90+1'	Stadium: ESPN Wide World of Sports Complex; Attendance: Behind-closed-doors; Referee: Rubiel Vazquez

Group A results
Pos	Team	Pld	W	D	L	GF	GA	GD	Pts	Qualification
1	Orlando City SC (H)	3	2	1	0	6	3	+3	7	Advance to knockout stage
2	Philadelphia Union	3	2	1	0	4	2	+2	7	Advance to knockout stage
3	New York City FC	3	1	0	2	2	4	−2	3	Advance to knockout stage
4	Inter Miami CF	3	0	0	3	2	5	−3	0	

Source: MLS
Rules for classification: Group stage tiebreakers
(H) Hosts

Knockout Stage

July 25 Round of 16	Orlando City	1–0	Montreal Impact	Orlando, Florida
8:00 pm	Akindele 60'; Moutinho (yellow card) 62'; Dike (yellow card) 90'	Report		Stadium: ESPN Wide World of Sports Complex; Attendance: Behind-closed-doors; Referee: Marcos De Oliveira

July 31 Quarter-final	Orlando City	1–1 (5–4 p)	Los Angeles FC	Orlando, Florida
7:30 pm	Ruan (yellow card) 9'; Pereyra (yellow card) 48'; Perea (yellow card) 86'; Moutinho 90'	Report	Palacios (yellow card) 8'; Wright-Phillips 60'	Stadium: ESPN Wide World of Sports Complex; Attendance: Behind-closed-doors; Referee: Joseph Dickerson
	Penalties
	Pereyra (penalty scored); Smith (penalty scored); Moutinho (penalty scored); Carlos (penalty scored); Nani (penalty scored)		(penalty scored) Ginella; (penalty missed) Harvey; (penalty scored) Rossi; (penalty scored) Rodríguez; (penalty scored) Blessing

August 6 Semi-final	Orlando City	3–1	Minnesota United FC	Orlando, Florida
8:00 pm	Nani 36', 42'; Michel 90+6'	Report	Toye 83'	Stadium: ESPN Wide World of Sports Complex; Attendance: Behind-closed-doors; Referee: Drew Fischer
Note: Kickoff delayed until 9:20 pm due to lightning

August 11 Final	Portland Timbers	2–1	Orlando City	Orlando, Florida
8:30 pm	Mabiala 27', (yellow card) 44'; Župarić 66'; D. Chará (yellow card) 70'; Villafaña (yellow card) 73'	Report	Pereyra 39'; Carlos (yellow card) 47'; Moutinho (yellow card) 63'; Nani (yellow card) 73'; Ruan (yellow card) 85'	Stadium: ESPN Wide World of Sports Complex; Attendance: Behind-closed-doors; Referee: Ismail Elfath

=== U.S. Open Cup ===
Following a restructuring to the competition, Orlando City became one of 11 MLS teams subject to entry in the third round of the U.S. Open Cup instead of the fourth round because they did not finish as a top 12 US-based team in the previous MLS season. The draw for the third round was scheduled take place on April 10, 2020. On August 17, 2020, the United States Soccer Federation announced the cancelation of the U.S. Open Cup as a result of the coronavirus pandemic, the first time the tournament had not been played since its inception in 1914.

== Squad statistics ==
=== Appearances ===
As of match played November 29, 2020

Starting appearances are listed first, followed by substitute appearances after the + symbol where applicable.

No.	Pos	Nat	Player	Total		MLS		Playoffs		MLS is Back	
No.	Pos	Nat	Player	Apps	Goals	Apps	Goals	Apps	Goals	Apps	Goals
Goalkeepers
1	GK	(Peru) PER	Pedro Gallese	24	0	19	0	1	0	4	0
23	GK	(United States) USA	Brian Rowe	5	0	4	0	1	0	0	0
31	GK	(United States) USA	Mason Stajduhar	0	0	0	0	0	0	0	0
Defenders
2	DF	(Brazil) BRA	Ruan	26	0	18+3	0	1	0	4	0
3	DF	(United States) USA	Alex DeJohn	6	0	0+6	0	0	0	0	0
4	DF	(Portugal) POR	João Moutinho	12	1	8	0	0	0	4	1
6	DF	(Sweden) SWE	Robin Jansson	27	0	21	0	2	0	4	0
15	DF	(Argentina) ARG	Rodrigo Schlegel	13	0	7+3	0	0+1	0	0+2	0
24	DF	(United States) USA	Kyle Smith	22	0	11+5	0	2	0	0+4	0
25	DF	(Brazil) BRA	Antônio Carlos	26	1	18+2	1	2	0	4	0
27	DF	(Canada) CAN	Kamal Miller	14	0	9+3	0	1+1	0	0	0
Midfielders
8	MF	(Ecuador) ECU	Sebas Méndez	23	0	11+8	0	0	0	4	0
10	MF	(Uruguay) URU	Mauricio Pereyra	22	3	14+2	2	2	0	4	1
11	MF	(Brazil) BRA	Júnior Urso	27	4	20+3	3	2	1	0+2	0
20	MF	(Spain) ESP	Uri Rosell	14	0	8	0	2	0	4	0
21	MF	(United States) USA	Andrés Perea	28	0	11+12	0	0+2	0	0+3	0
30	MF	(United States) USA	David Loera	2	0	0+2	0	0	0	0	0
33	MF	(United States) USA	Jordan Bender	2	0	1+1	0	0	0	0	0
34	MF	(Jamaica) JAM	Joey DeZart	12	0	4+7	0	0	0	0+1	0
Forwards
9	FW	(United States) USA	Chris Mueller	28	10	17+5	10	2	0	4	0
13	FW	(Canada) CAN	Tesho Akindele	23	4	8+9	3	0+2	0	4	1
14	FW	(United States) USA	Dom Dwyer	2	0	2	0	0	0	0	0
17	FW	(Portugal) POR	Nani	25	9	16+3	6	2	1	4	2
18	FW	(United States) USA	Daryl Dike	22	8	15+2	8	2	0	0+3	0
19	FW	(United States) USA	Benji Michel	26	6	8+13	5	0+2	0	0+3	1
22	FW	(Ecuador) ECU	Alexander Alvarado	2	0	0+2	0	0	0	0	0
77	FW	(Brazil) BRA	Robinho	6	0	2+3	0	0+1	0	0	0
99	FW	(Brazil) BRA	Matheus Aiás	4	1	0+4	1	0	0	0	0
Players away from the club on loan:
10	MF	(Paraguay) PAR	Josué Colmán	0	0	0	0	0	0	0	0
29	FW	(Colombia) COL	Santiago Patiño	4	0	0+2	0	0	0	0+2	0

=== Goalscorers ===
As of match played November 29, 2020

Rank	No.	Pos.	Name	MLS	Playoffs	MLS is Back	Total
1	9	FW	(United States) Chris Mueller	10	0	0	10
2	17	FW	(Portugal) Nani	6	1	2	9
3	18	FW	(United States) Daryl Dike	8	0	0	8
4	19	FW	(United States) Benji Michel	5	0	1	6
5	11	MF	(Brazil) Júnior Urso	3	1	0	4
5	13	FW	(Canada) Tesho Akindele	3	0	1	4
7	10	MF	(Uruguay) Mauricio Pereyra	2	0	1	3
8	4	DF	(Portugal) João Moutinho	0	0	1	1
8	25	DF	(Brazil) Antônio Carlos	1	0	0	1
8	99	FW	(Brazil) Matheus Aiás	1	0	0	1
Own goal				1	0	0	1
Total				40	2	6	48

=== Shutouts ===
As of matches play November 29, 2020

Rank	No.	Pos.	Name	MLS	Playoffs	MLS is Back	Total
1	1	GK	(Peru) Pedro Gallese	3	0	1	4
2	23	GK	(United States) Brian Rowe	1	0	0	1
Total				4	0	1	5

=== Disciplinary record ===
As of match played November 29, 2020

No.	Pos.	Name	MLS			Playoffs			MLS is Back			Total		
No.	Pos.	Name	Yellow card	(yellow card) (yellow-red card)	Red card	Yellow card	(yellow card) (yellow-red card)	Red card	Yellow card	(yellow card) (yellow-red card)	Red card	Yellow card	(yellow card) (yellow-red card)	Red card
1	GK	(Peru) Pedro Gallese	2	0	0	0	1	0	0	0	0	3	1	0
2	DF	(Brazil) Ruan	5	0	0	1	0	1	2	0	0	8	0	1
4	DF	(Portugal) João Moutinho	4	0	0	0	0	0	2	0	0	6	0	0
6	DF	(Sweden) Robin Jansson	2	0	0	1	0	0	0	0	0	3	0	0
8	MF	(Ecuador) Sebas Méndez	3	1	0	0	0	0	0	0	0	3	1	0
10	MF	(Uruguay) Mauricio Pereyra	6	0	0	0	0	1	1	0	0	7	0	1
11	MF	(Brazil) Júnior Urso	3	0	0	1	0	0	0	0	0	4	0	0
15	DF	(Argentina) Rodrigo Schlegel	4	0	0	0	0	0	0	0	0	4	0	0
17	FW	(Portugal) Nani	3	0	1	1	0	0	1	0	0	5	0	1
18	FW	(United States) Daryl Dike	0	0	0	1	0	0	1	0	0	2	0	0
19	FW	(United States) Benji Michel	2	0	0	0	0	0	0	0	0	2	0	0
20	MF	(Spain) Uri Rosell	2	0	0	0	0	0	0	0	0	2	0	0
21	MF	(Colombia) Andrés Perea	3	0	0	1	0	0	1	0	0	5	0	0
24	DF	(United States) Kyle Smith	2	0	0	0	0	0	0	0	0	2	0	0
25	DF	(Brazil) Antônio Carlos	2	0	0	2	0	0	1	0	0	5	0	0
27	DF	(Canada) Kamal Miller	3	0	0	0	0	0	0	0	0	3	0	0
Total			46	1	1	8	1	2	9	0	0	63	2	3

== Player movement ==
Per Major League Soccer and club policies, terms of the deals do not get disclosed.

=== MLS SuperDraft picks ===
Draft picks are not automatically signed to the team roster. The 2020 MLS SuperDraft was held in January 2020. Orlando had six selections, making five before electing to pass in the fourth round.

2020 Orlando City MLS SuperDraft Picks
Round	Selection	Player	Position	College	Status
1	5	(United States) Daryl Dike	CF	University of Virginia	Signed
2	31	(Jamaica) Joey DeZart	DM	(North Carolina) Wake Forest University	Signed
2	39	(United States) Jonathan Dean	CB	University of Central Florida	Not signed
2	44	(United States) Austin Aviza	GK	(Rhode Island) Providence College	Signed to OCB
3	57	(United States) Nick O'Callaghan	LB	Florida International University	Signed to OCB
4	83	PASS			

=== Transfers in ===
No.	Name	Pos.	Transferred from	Fee/notes	Date	Ref.
2	(Brazil) Ruan	RB	(Brazil) Barra da Tijuca	Exercised option to buy	November 22, 2019	
30	(United States) David Loera	AM	(United States) NC State Wolfpack	Signed Homegrown contract	December 9, 2019	
33	(United States) Jordan Bender	CM	(United States) Orlando City B	Signed Homegrown contract	December 12, 2019	
11	(Brazil) Júnior Urso	CM	(Brazil) Corinthians	Undisclosed fee, reportedly $900k	January 13, 2020	
1	(Peru) Pedro Gallese	GK	(Mexico) Veracruz	Free transfer	January 17, 2020	
26	(United States) Michael Halliday	RB	(United States) Orlando City B	Signed Homegrown contract	July 15, 2020	
99	(Brazil) Matheus Aiás	CF	(England) Watford	Undisclosed fee	August 21, 2020	

=== Loans in ===
No.	Name	Pos.	Loaned from	Notes	Date	Ref.
21	(Colombia) Andrés Perea	CM	(Colombia) Atlético Nacional	One-year loan with option to buy	December 9, 2019	
15	(Argentina) Rodrigo Schlegel	CB	(Argentina) Racing Club	One-year loan with option to buy	December 23, 2019	
25	(Brazil) Antônio Carlos	CB	(Brazil) Palmeiras	One-year loan with option to buy	December 30, 2019	
22	(Ecuador) Alexander Alvarado	LW	(Ecuador) Aucas	Until end of season with option to buy	October 13, 2020	

=== Transfers out ===
No.	Name	Pos.	Transferred to	Fee/notes	Date	Ref.
26	(Peru) Carlos Ascues	DM	(Peru) Alianza Lima	Option declined; Signed with Alianza Lima on 1/9/20	November 21, 2019	
99	(United States) Adam Grinwis	GK	(United States) Sacramento Republic	Option declined; Signed with Sacramento Republic on 1/21/20	November 21, 2019	
7	(Colombia) Cristian Higuita	CM	(Colombia) Atlético Junior	Contract expired; Signed with Atlético Junior on 12/17/19	November 21, 2019	
4	(Canada) Will Johnson	CM	(United States) Central Florida Panthers	Contract expired; Signed with Central Florida Panthers on 05/02/21	November 21, 2019	
16	(United States) Sacha Kljestan	AM	(United States) LA Galaxy	Contract expired; Signed with LA Galaxy on 12/11/19	November 21, 2019	
15	(United States) Cam Lindley	DM	(United States) Indy Eleven	Option declined; Signed with Indy Eleven on 2/6/20	November 21, 2019	
12	(United States) Shane O'Neill	CB	(United States) Seattle Sounders FC	Option declined; Signed with Seattle Sounders on 1/14/20	November 21, 2019	
5	(United States) Dillon Powers	DM	(Scotland) Dundee United	Option declined; Signed with Dundee United on 1/10/20	November 21, 2019	
18	(Trinidad and Tobago) Greg Ranjitsingh	GK	(United States) Minnesota United FC	Option declined; Selected by Minnesota United in End-of-Year Waiver Draft	November 21, 2019	
22	(Senegal) Lamine Sané	CB	(Netherlands) FC Utrecht	Option declined; Signed with FC Utrecht on 2/8/20	November 21, 2019	

=== Loans out ===
No.	Name	Pos.	Loaned to	Notes	Date	Ref.
10	(Paraguay) Josué Colmán	AM	(Paraguay) Cerro Porteño	Continuation of one and a half-year loan (with right of recall)	June 12, 2019	
29	(Colombia) Santiago Patiño	CF	(Mexico) Cimarrones de Sonora	On loan until December 31, 2020	August 21, 2020	
31	(United States) Mason Stajduhar	GK	(United States) New York City FC	On loan for the duration of the 2020 CONCACAF Champions League	December 14, 2020	
