= Brandon John =

Vincentian footballer (born 1995)

Personal information
- Full name: Evan Brandon John
- Date of birth: January 5, 1995 (age 31)
- Place of birth: Kingstown, Saint Vincent and the Grenadines
- Height: 1.84 m (6 ft 0 in)
- Position: Centre-back

Youth career
- Scarborough Blizzard
- –2013: Toronto FC
- 2013–2014: Erzgebirge Aue

Senior career*
Years	Team	Apps	(Gls)
2012	SC Toronto		
2014–2015	Erzgebirge Aue II	24	(2)
2016	Seattle Sounders FC 2	9	(0)
2017	Vaughan Azzurri	12	(0)
2018	SIMA Águilas	8	(0)
2019	Orlando City B	10	(1)
2020–2021	Atlético Ottawa	12	(0)

International career^{‡}
2015	Canada U20	1	(0)
2015	Canada U23	2	(0)
2024–	Saint Vincent and the Grenadines	2	(0)
- * Club domestic league appearances and goals as of September 20, 2021 ‡ National team caps and goals as of May 20, 2016

Evan Brandon John (born January 5, 1995) is a Vincentian footballer who plays as a centre-back for the Saint Vincent and the Grenadines national team.

== Club career ==
=== Early career ===
In 2012, John played with SC Toronto in the Canadian Soccer League. He was part of the Toronto FC Academy program before joining German club FC Erzgebirge Aue where he played for their under-23 team.

=== Seattle Sounders FC 2 ===
On April 29, 2016, he signed with USL club Seattle Sounders FC 2. He made his debut for the club two days later in a 1–1 draw against Oklahoma City Energy. In August 2016, John announced that he had torn his ACL and would be out for the rest of the 2016 season. He made a total of nine appearances that year.

=== Vaughan Azzurri ===
In 2017, John played for League1 Ontario side Vaughan Azzurri, making twelve league appearances.

=== SIMA Águilas ===
In 2018, John played for American USL League Two side SIMA Águilas, making eight appearances.

=== Orlando City B ===
On February 20, 2019, John signed with USL League One side Orlando City B. That season, he made ten league appearances, scoring one goal.

=== Atlético Ottawa ===
On March 23, 2020, John signed with Canadian Premier League side Atlético Ottawa. He made his debut in Ottawa's inaugural match on August 15 against York9.

== International career ==
John represented Canada at the 2015 CONCACAF U-20 Championship. In May 2016, John was called to Canada's U23 national team for a pair of friendlies against Guyana and Grenada. He saw action in both matches. John was invited to his first Men's National team camp in August 2017 as the team was preparing for a friendly against Jamaica.
