= Emmanuel Hagan =

Ghanaian footballer

Personal information
- Full name: Emmanuel Hagan
- Date of birth: 16 May 2000 (age 26)
- Place of birth: Ghana
- Height: 6 ft 4 in (1.93 m)
- Position: Defender

Team information
- Current team: UNC Greensboro Spartans
- Number: 27

Youth career
- 2018–2019: Orlando City

College career
Years	Team	Apps	(Gls)
2020–2024	UNC Greensboro Spartans	83	(4)

Senior career*
Years	Team	Apps	(Gls)
2019	Orlando City B	2	(0)
- * Club domestic league appearances and goals as of 10 June 2021

Emmanuel Hagan (born 16 May 2000) is a Ghanaian footballer who played college soccer for the University of North Carolina Greensboro (UNCG) in NCAA Division I.

== Career ==
Born in Ghana, Hagan is a graduate of the Mirage Football Academy based in Accra.

A member of Orlando City's Club Development Academy system at Montverde Academy since 2018, he signed an academy contract with Orlando City's USL reserve affiliate Orlando City B for the 2019 season and made his professional debut on 30 March 2019, starting in a 3–1 loss to FC Tucson in the season opener.

In February 2020, Hagan signed a National Letter of Intent to play college soccer for NCAA Division I school UNC Greensboro beginning August 2020. Hagan was part of the All-SoCon first team for the 2020, 2021, and 2022 seasons and the College Soccer News Preseason All-America Third Team prior to the 2023 season. As of 2024, he has made 84 appearances and scored four goals for UNCG.
