= Jahlane Forbes =

American soccer player (born 2002)

Personal information
- Date of birth: February 5, 2002 (age 24)
- Place of birth: Brooklyn, New York, United States
- Height: 6 ft 0 in (1.83 m)
- Position: Defender

Team information
- Current team: Forward Madison
- Number: 24

Youth career
- 2016–2019: Orlando City

College career
Years	Team	Apps	(Gls)
2020–2023	Wake Forest Demon Deacons	51	(3)

Senior career*
Years	Team	Apps	(Gls)
2018	SIMA Águilas	1	(0)
2019–2020	Orlando City B	3	(0)
2022	The Villages SC	3	(0)
2023	Manhattan SC	1	(0)
2024–2025	Charlotte FC	0	(0)
2024–2025	→ Crown Legacy FC (loan)	24	(4)
2025	→ North Carolina FC (loan)	5	(1)
2026	Las Vegas Lights	2	(0)
2026–	Forward Madison	13	(0)

International career
2018	United States U17	3	(0)
- * Club domestic league appearances and goals as of October 31, 2026

Jahlane Forbes (born February 5, 2002) is an American professional soccer player who plays as a defender for USL League One side Forward Madison FC.

== Career ==
A member of Orlando City's Club Development Academy system since 2016, Forbes made 76 appearances and scored 4 goals across multiple age groups in four seasons with the team.

Forbes made two appearances for Orlando's USL League One affiliate Orlando City B, during their inaugural USL League One season in 2019.

In July 2019, Forbes verbally committed to play for NCAA Division I team Wake Forest beginning Fall 2020.

In January 2020, Forbes spent a month on trial with Brøndby IF in Denmark, playing a series of friendlies with the club's under-19 team.

Forbes returned to Orlando City B for the 2020 season, starting in the season opener on August 1 against Tormenta FC.

Charlotte FC selected Forbes in the second round of the 2024 MLS SuperDraft in December 2023. He signed a professional contract with the team in February 2024.

On August 22, 2025, Forbes joined North Carolina FC of the USL Championship on a loan deal though the remainder of the 2025 season.

In January 2026, Las Vegas Lights announced they had signed Forbes to a one-year contract with a club option for 2027. Las Vegas would later transfer Forbes to USL League One club Forward Madison FC on June 30th for an undisclosed fee.

== International ==
Forbes earned his first call up to the United States under-17 national team for international friendlies in Costa Rica on August 2, 2018

== Career statistics ==
As of August 1, 2020

Club	Season	League			Playoffs		National cup		Other		Total	
Club	Season	Division	Apps	Goals	Apps	Goals	Apps	Goals	Apps	Goals	Apps	Goals
Orlando City B	2019	USL League One	2	0	—		—		—		2	0
Orlando City B	2020	USL League One	1	0	—		—		—		1	0
Career Totals			3	0	0	0	0	0	0	0	3	0
