= Dalton Pando =

American soccer player

Personal information
- Date of birth: March 4, 1996 (age 30)
- Place of birth: Hayward, California, U.S.
- Height: 5 ft 9 in (1.75 m)
- Position: Midfielder

Youth career
- Real Salt Lake
- San Jose Earthquakes

College career
Years	Team	Apps	(Gls)
2015	Johnson & Wales Wildcats	19	(16)
2016	UC Santa Barbara Gauchos	19	(2)

Senior career*
Years	Team	Apps	(Gls)
2017	Nashville SC U23	13	(1)
2018	FC Tucson	14	(2)
2019	South Georgia Tormenta	6	(0)
- * Club domestic league appearances and goals as of October 21, 2019

Dalton Pando (born March 4, 1996) is an American soccer player who most recently played as a midfielder for Tormenta FC in USL League One.

== Early life and education ==
Pando was born on March 4, 1996, in Hayward, California, to Cheree and Dominic Pando. He was raised in Folsom, California, and attended Ponderosa High School. As a youth soccer player, Pando played for both the Real Salt Lake and San Jose Earthquakes academies. He was a highly regarded prospect and was named the 50th-best recruit in the country by TopDrawerSoccer and as a NSCAA All-American. In 2012, Pando was a member of the USA U-17 National Team Residency Program.

Pando played college soccer for Johnson & Wales University for one season before transferring to the University of California, Santa Barbara. He played for the UC Santa Barbara Gauchos men's soccer team in 2016 and scored two goals in 19 games.

== Soccer career ==
Pando signed with Nashville SC after UC Santa Barbara and played the 2017 season with Nashville SC U23. The following season he played with FC Tucson.

South Georgia Tormenta FC signed Pando in December 2018 for the 2019 season. He played in 6 games and did not return the following year. He then participated in The Soccer Tournament 2024 with ZALA.

Pando currently plays for United Premier Soccer League team FC Folsom, which is owned by his father.
