= Moisés Tablante =

Venezuelan footballer (born 2001)

Personal information
- Date of birth: 4 July 2001 (age 25)
- Place of birth: Valencia, Venezuela
- Height: 5 ft 10 in (1.78 m)
- Position: Midfielder

Team information
- Current team: Lusitânia
- Number: 11

Youth career
- 2017–2019: Orlando City

Senior career*
Years	Team	Apps	(Gls)
2019–2023	Orlando City B	71	(12)
2024	FC Cincinnati 2	21	(3)
2025–2026	Atlanta United 2	42	(5)
2026–	Lusitânia	3	(0)
- * Club domestic league appearances and goals as of 30 August 2026

Moisés Tablante (born 4 July 2001) is a Venezuelan professional footballer who plays as a midfielder for Liga Portugal 2 club Lusitânia Lourosa.

== Career ==
A member of Orlando City's Club Development Academy system since 2017, Tablante made 51 appearances in two seasons with the academy.

In February 2019, Tablante signed an academy contract with Orlando City's USL League One affiliate Orlando City B ahead of the 2019 season. He scored his first goal for the team on 17 May 2019 in a 2–0 win over Toronto FC II. Tablante returned for the 2020 season, registering two assists in Orlando's first win of the year, a 2–0 win over New England Revolution II on 7 August 2020.

Tablante moved to FC Cincinnati 2 on January 18, 2024.

== Career statistics ==
As of 24 September 2022

Club	Season	League			Cup		Playoffs		Total	
Club	Season	Division	Apps	Goals	Apps	Goals	Apps	Goals	Apps	Goals
Orlando City B	2019	USL League One	13	2	—		—		13	2
Orlando City B	2020	USL League One	14	0	—		—		14	0
Orlando City B	2022	MLS Next Pro	21	6	—		—		21	6
Career totals			48	8	0	0	0	0	48	8
