= Randy Mendoza =

American soccer player

Personal information
- Date of birth: March 21, 1996 (age 30)
- Place of birth: Santa Paula, California, U.S.
- Height: 5 ft 10 in (1.78 m)
- Position: Defender

Youth career
- Santa Paula High School

College career
Years	Team	Apps	(Gls)
2014	Cal State Los Angeles Golden Eagles	21	(0)
2015–2017	UC Santa Barbara Gauchos	59	(0)

Senior career*
Years	Team	Apps	(Gls)
2016–2017	Ventura County Fusion	18	(1)
2018	SIMA Águilas	12	(0)
2019	Orlando City B	21	(0)
2020	Stumptown Athletic	2	(0)
2021–2022	Tacoma Defiance	45	(1)
- * Club domestic league appearances and goals as of September 24, 2022

Randy Mendoza (born March 21, 1996) is an American professional former soccer player who played as a defender for Tacoma Defiance in MLS Next Pro.

== Early life and education ==
Mendoza was raised in Santa Paula, California and attended Santa Paula High School where he played soccer. He continued his education at California State University, Los Angeles where he played for the Golden Eagles in 2014. He appeared in 21 games before transferring to the University of California, Santa Barbara. He was a student-athlete for the UC Santa Barbara Gauchos men's soccer team from 2015 to 2017.

== Club career ==
While in college, Mendoza played for Premier Development League clubs Ventura County Fusion and SIMA Águilas while maintaining NCAA eligibility.

Mendoza signed professional terms with Orlando City B in February 2019. He made his professional debut on March 30, 2019, against FC Tucson and was sent off in the 45th minute.

On June 12, 2019, Mendoza was part of the Orlando City senior team's traveling squad for their U.S. Open Cup Fourth Round game against USL Championship team Memphis 901. Mendoza appeared as a stoppage time substitute as Orlando won 3–1.

On February 25, 2020, Mendoza was announced as a new signing for Stumptown Athletic of the National Independent Soccer Association.

On March 15, 2021, Mendoza was announced as one of four new signings by USL Championship side Tacoma Defiance.
