= Luca Mancuso =

American soccer player

Personal information
- Date of birth: September 21, 2001 (age 25)
- Place of birth: Miami Beach, Florida, United States
- Position: Goalkeeper

Team information
- Current team: NYU Violets
- Number: 21

Youth career
- 2015–2019: Weston FC
- 2019: Orlando City SC

College career
Years	Team	Apps	(Gls)
2019–	NYU Violets	47	(0)

Senior career*
Years	Team	Apps	(Gls)
2019	Orlando City B	1	(0)
- * Club domestic league appearances and goals as of November 8, 2023

Luca Mancuso (born September 21, 2001) is an American soccer player who plays as a goalkeeper for New York University.

== Career ==
Mancuso came up through the Weston FC U.S. Soccer Development Academy, starting with their U13/14 side for the 2015–16 season. In February 2019, he joined Orlando City B for the inaugural season of USL League One, making his professional debut on March 30, 2019, in a season-opening 3–1 defeat to FC Tucson. He made one appearance and was released at the end of the season.
