= Nathan Simeon =

Canadian soccer player

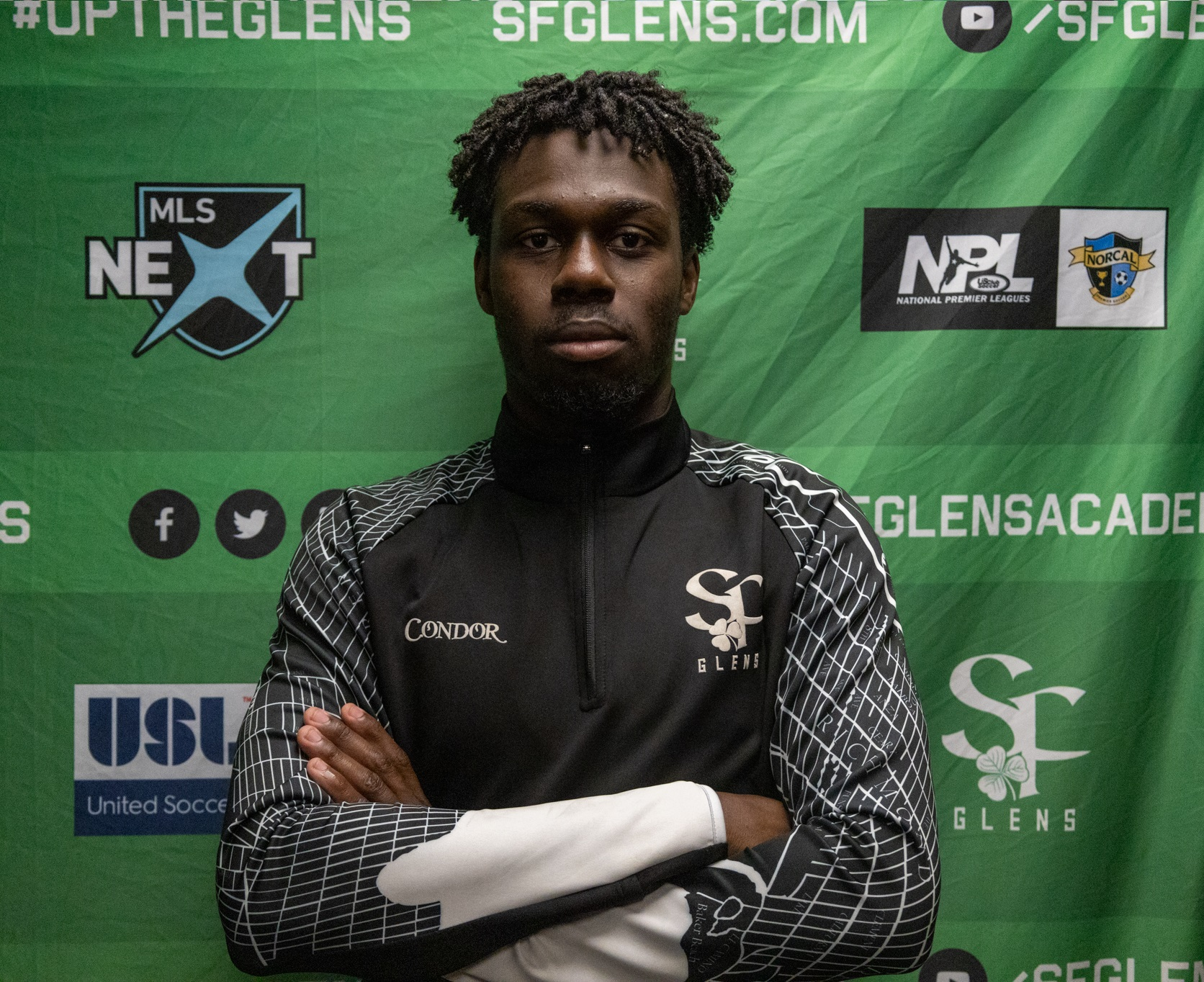
- Simeon with the San Francisco Glens in 2023

Personal information
- Full name: Nathan Simeon
- Date of birth: February 14, 2000 (age 26)
- Place of birth: Montreal, Quebec, Canada
- Height: 5 ft 11 in (1.80 m)
- Position: Defender

Team information
- Current team: Vermont Green
- Number: 2

Youth career
- 2018–2019: Orlando City

College career
Years	Team	Apps	(Gls)
2019–2023	San Francisco Dons	52	(0)
2024	Vermont Catamounts	17	(0)

Senior career*
Years	Team	Apps	(Gls)
2019	Orlando City B	15	(0)
2022–2023	San Francisco Glens	10	(0)
2024–2025	Vermont Green	13	(0)
- * Club domestic league appearances and goals as of August 17, 2025

Nathan Simeon (born February 14, 2000) is a Canadian soccer player who plays as a defender for the Vermont Catamounts and the Vermont Green.

== Career ==
Simeon began his career by accepting a scholarship to join Orlando City's Club Development Academy system at Montverde Academy for the 2018–19 season. He made 14 appearances in his debut year.

On March 30, 2019, Simeon signed an academy contract with Orlando City's USL reserve affiliate OCB and made his senior debut in the season opener later that day, a 3–1 loss to FC Tucson.

In July 2019, Simeon verbally committed to play NCAA Division I soccer at the University of San Francisco. In 2023, Simeon transferred to the University of Vermont for his final season of eligibility.

Simeon signed with USL League Two side San Francisco Glens in May 2022. In 2024, he signed with Vermont Green.
