= Austin Amer =

American soccer player (born 2000)

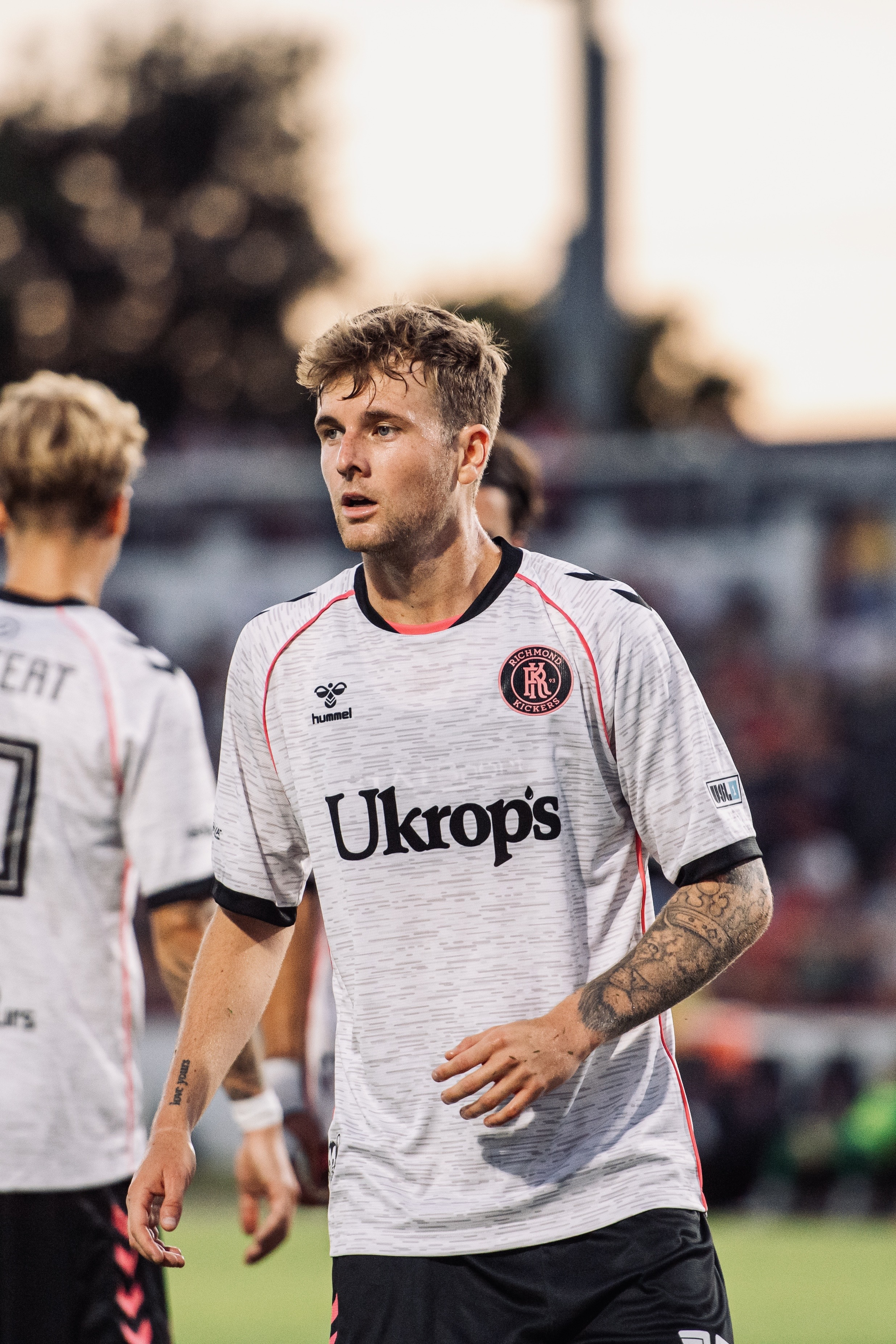
- Amer with the Richmond Kickers in 2026

Personal information
- Date of birth: February 17, 2000 (age 26)
- Place of birth: Tampa, Florida, U.S.
- Height: 6 ft 1 in (1.85 m)
- Position: Midfielder

Team information
- Current team: Richmond Kickers
- Number: 18

Youth career
- 2015–2016: Orlando City
- 2017–2019: Barça Residency Academy

Senior career*
Years	Team	Apps	(Gls)
2018	Reading United	3	(0)
2019–2020	Orlando City B	33	(0)
2021–2022	Sportfreunde Lotte	7	(0)
2026–	Richmond Kickers	27	(2)
- * Club domestic league appearances and goals as of November 2, 2026

Austin Amer (born February 17, 2000) is an American soccer player who plays as a midfielder for USL League One club Richmond Kickers.

== Career ==
=== Youth ===
A native of Tampa, Florida, Amer played for the Orlando City Development Academy during the 2015–16 season. In 2017 he moved to play for the Barça Residency Academy based at Grande Sports World in Casa Grande, Arizona. He emerged as one of the program's best midfielders in the inaugural year and returned to play for the U19 team the following season, electing to take a gap year while still considering whether to play college soccer or turn pro.

=== Orlando City B ===
In March 2019, Amer signed his first professional contract with USL League One side Orlando City B. In doing so he became the first Barça Residency Academy player to sign professionally. He spent two seasons with the team, making 33 appearances, before being released in October 2020.

=== Sportfreunde Lotte ===
On July 20, 2021, Amer signed with German semi-professional side Sportfreunde Lotte in the fourth-tier Regionalliga West.

=== Richmond Kickers ===
On 7 January 2026, Amer signed for the Richmond Kickers in USL League One. He made his debut for the club in a 1–1 draw against AV Alta in the opening match for the USL League One season.

== Career statistics ==
=== Club ===
As of October 24, 2020.

Club	Season	League			Cup		Total	
Club	Season	Division	Apps	Goals	Apps	Goals	Apps	Goals
Orlando City B	2019	USL1	26	0	—		26	0
Orlando City B	2020	USL1	7	0	—		7	0
Career total			33	0	0	0	33	0
