= Thiago de Souza =

Brazilian footballer

Personal information
- Full name: Thiago de Morais de Souza
- Date of birth: January 7, 1999 (age 27)
- Place of birth: Colombo, Brazil
- Height: 1.74 m (5 ft 9 in)
- Position: Attacking midfielder

Team information
- Current team: Retrô Brasil (on loan from Athletico Paranaense)

Youth career
- 2014–: Athletico Paranaense

Senior career*
Years	Team	Apps	(Gls)
2019–	Athletico Paranaense	0	(0)
2019	→ Orlando City B (loan)	22	(6)
2020–	→ Retrô Brasil (loan)	0	(0)
- * Club domestic league appearances and goals as of 17 January 2020

Thiago de Morais de Souza (born 7 January 1999), sometimes known as Thiaguinho or just Thiago, is a Brazilian footballer who currently plays for Retrô Brasil, on loan from Athletico Paranaense.

== Club career ==
Thiago de Souza began his youth career at Athletico Paranaense in 2014. He was loaned to USL League One team Orlando City B in the United States for the 2019 season. He finished as the team's leading goalscorer with six goals. In January 2020, he was loaned to Retrô Brasil for the duration of the Campeonato Pernambucano.
