= Matheus Silva (footballer, born 1996) =

Brazilian footballer

Personal information
- Full name: Matheus Martins Silva
- Date of birth: December 8, 1996 (age 29)
- Place of birth: Taboão da Serra, Brazil
- Height: 1.88 m (6 ft 2 in)
- Positions: Defender; defensive midfielder

Team information
- Current team: Baltimore Blast
- Number: 32

Youth career
- 2011–2014: Montverde Academy

Senior career*
Years	Team	Apps	(Gls)
2015–2017	San Jose Earthquakes	5	(0)
2016	→ Arizona United (loan)	16	(0)
2017	→ Reno 1868 (loan)	2	(0)
2018	Swope Park Rangers	16	(1)
2019	Orlando City B	18	(0)
2019	Miami FC	2	(0)
2020	Hartford Athletic	14	(1)
2021	Figueirense	3	(0)
2022	FC Tulsa	11	(0)
2024–	Baltimore Blast (indoor)	0	(0)
- * Club domestic league appearances and goals as of 27 November 2024 ‡ National team caps and goals as of 12 November 2015

Matheus Martins Silva (born December 8, 1996) is a Brazilian footballer who plays as a defender for the Baltimore Blast in the Major Arena Soccer League.

== Career ==
Silva signed with Major League Soccer club San Jose Earthquakes on July 15, 2015. He made his professional debut on March 6, 2016 as an injury time substitute during a 1-0 victory over Colorado Rapids. Silva was loaned to Arizona United SC on May 13, 2016, Silva was again loaned out to San Jose's USL affiliate Reno 1868 FC in March 2017.

Silva was released by San Jose on 27 November 2017.

Silva signed with United Soccer League side Swope Park Rangers on 5 January 2018.

In 2019, Silva signed with the newly-reformed Orlando City B as they contested the inaugural USL League One season. He made his debut for the team on April 19 in a 2–1 defeat to Forward Madison. After OCB's season ended, Silva joined Miami FC for their inaugural season in the National Independent Soccer Association.

On January 13, 2020, it was announced that Silva had signed with Hartford Athletic for the 2020 season.

Silva moved back to Brazil with Figueirense in March 2021, but it was announced at the end of the season he would be released by the club.

Silva returned to the United States on 11 January 2022, signing a one-year deal with USL Championship side FC Tulsa. He was released by Tulsa following the 2022 season.

Silva joined Major Arena Soccer League club Baltimore Blast in September 2024.

== Lake Tahoe incident ==
On 4 July 2017, Silva had to be pulled out of the water while swimming in Lake Tahoe. After receiving life-saving resuscitation measures at the scene, he was transferred to a nearby hospital in Lake Tahoe. He was later airlifted to Renown Regional Medical Center in Reno, where he was described as being in a "critical, but stable condition". On 6 July 2017, Silva awoke from his coma and was described as "fully responsive". San Jose captain Chris Wondolowski honored Silva by wearing his number, 38, on his jersey during the U.S. Open Cup quarterfinal match against the LA Galaxy on July 10; Wondolowski scored a brace while wearing Silva's number to lead the team to a 3-2 victory.
