= Sérginho (footballer, born 2000) =

Brazilian footballer

Personal information
- Full name: Sérgio Costabile Elia
- Date of birth: 21 January 2000 (age 26)
- Place of birth: Guarujá, Brazil
- Height: 1.75 m (5 ft 9 in)
- Position: Attacking midfielder

Youth career
- 2010–2012: Santos
- 2013–2019: Corinthians
- 2018: → Oeste (loan)

Senior career*
Years	Team	Apps	(Gls)
2019	Orlando City B	24	(1)
2020	→ Tombense (loan)	9	(0)
- * Club domestic league appearances and goals as of 14:01, 7 February 2021 (UTC)

Sérgio Costabile Elia (born 21 January 2000), also known as Sérginho, is a Brazilian footballer who plays as an attacking midfielder.

== Club career ==
=== Youth career ===
Sérginho was a two-time São Paulo state champion at youth level, both with Santos at U11 level and then again with Corinthians U13s. He also lifted the U17 Copa do Brasil in 2016 and made nine appearances in the Copa São Paulo de Futebol Júnior at U20 level but never played for the team at senior level.

=== Orlando City B ===
In February 2019, Sérginho left Brazil to sign with Orlando City reserve side OCB for the inaugural USL League One season. On 30 March 2019, he made his professional debut, starting in the season opener as Orlando lost 3–1 to FC Tucson. On 22 May 2019, Sérginho scored his first professional goal in a 3–2 win over Richmond Kickers, a long-range 30 yard strike into the top-left corner. The goal was awarded USL League One goal of the week.

Serginho was loaned to Tombense ahead of the 2020 Campeonato Mineiro. He was named to a match day squad for the first time in Tombense's gameweek three match at home to Patrocinense as a substitute but did not make an appearance.

== International career ==
In 2014, Sérginho was called up to train with the Brazil U15 national team.
