= Léo Simas =

Brazilian footballer

Personal information
- Full name: Leonardo da Silva Simas
- Date of birth: 12 November 1998 (age 28)
- Place of birth: Catanduva, Brazil
- Height: 1.72 m (5 ft 8 in)
- Positions: Defender; midfielder

Team information
- Current team: Patriotas

Youth career
- Grêmio Catanduvense

Senior career*
Years	Team	Apps	(Gls)
2016	Grêmio Catanduvense	2	(0)
2017–2020	Athletico Paranaense	4	(0)
2019	→ Orlando City B (loan)	22	(2)
2021	Rio Branco	13	(0)
2022	Grêmio Anápolis		
2023	Velo Clube	1	(0)
2023–	Patriotas		
- * Club domestic league appearances and goals as of 19 February 2023

Leonardo da Silva Simas (born 12 November 1998), known as Léo Simas, is a Brazilian footballer who plays for Patriotas.
