= Montverde, Florida =

Town in Florida, United States

- Town
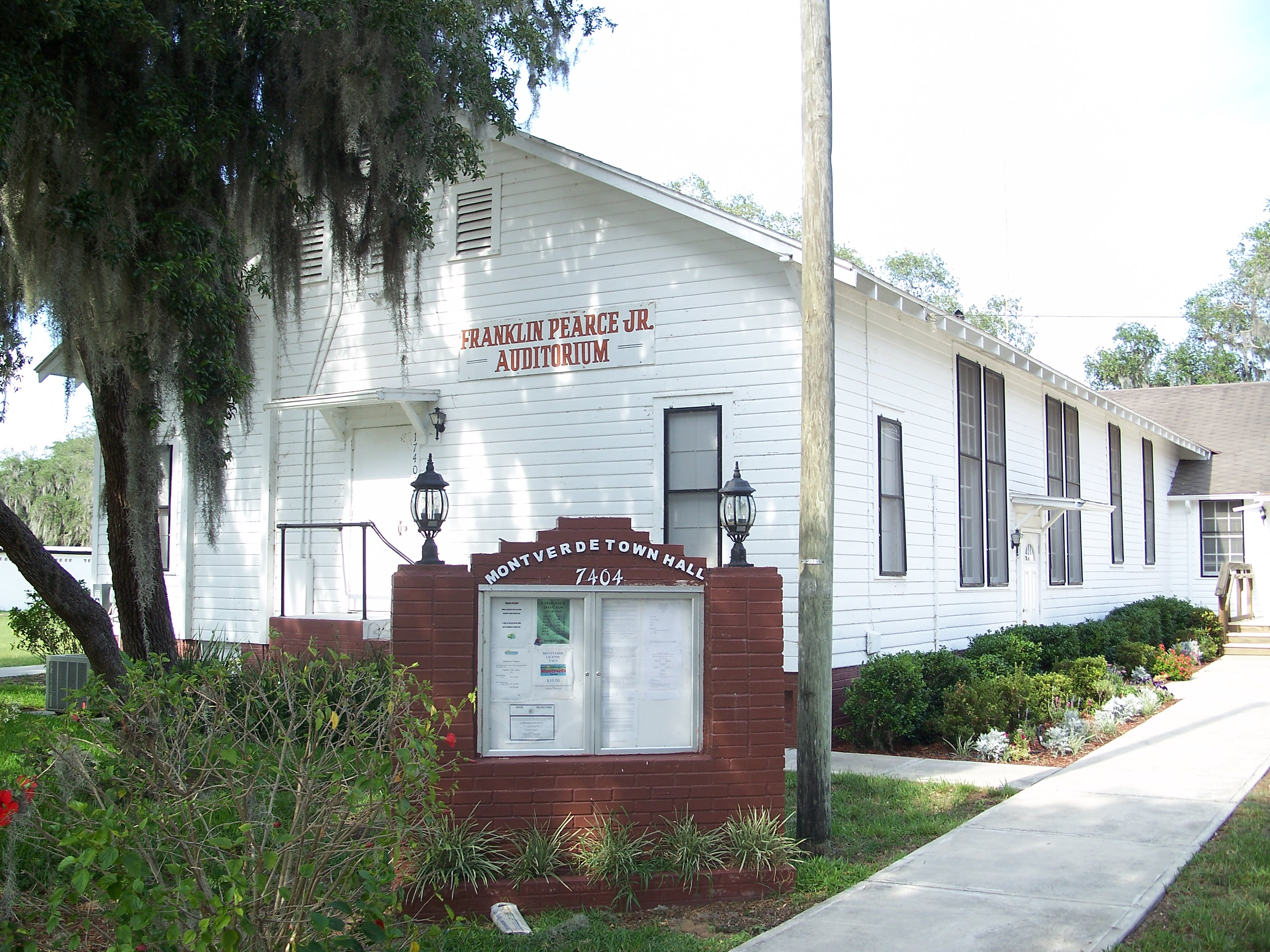
- Montverde Town Hall

- Location in Lake County and the state of Florida
- Coordinates: 28°35′53″N 81°40′20″W
- Country: United States
- State: Florida
- County: Lake
- Settled (West Lake Apopka): 1865
- Incorporated (Town of Montverde): May 18, 1925

Government
  - Type: Mayor-Council
  - Mayor: Joe Wynkoop
  - Vice Mayor: Carol Womack
  - Council Members: Grant Roberts and Bryan Rubio
  - Town Manager: Paul Larino
  - Town Clerk: Caroline Trepanier

Area
  - Total: 1.88 sq mi (4.88 km^{2})
  - Land: 1.68 sq mi (4.34 km^{2})
  - Water: 0.21 sq mi (0.54 km^{2})
- Elevation: 115 ft (35 m)

Population (2020)
  - Total: 1,655
  - Density: 989/sq mi (381.7/km^{2})
- Time zone: UTC-5 (Eastern (EST))
  - Summer (DST): UTC-4 (EDT)
- ZIP code: 34756
- Area codes: 407, 689
- FIPS code: 12-46525
- GNIS feature ID: 2406185
- Website: www.mymontverde.com

Montverde is a town in Lake County, Florida, United States. The population was 1,655 at the 2020 census. It is part of the Orlando–Kissimmee–Sanford Metropolitan Statistical Area.

== History ==
Montverde was the location of a Native American settlement and burial ground. The earliest record of American settlement is from 1865, and initially named "West Lake Apopka". The community's name derives from the Spanish, "Monte Verde", by a settler from Vermont (which also means "green mountain" and derives from the French, "Vert Mont") who remarked on its rolling green hills while arriving at the site by boat on Lake Apopka. The Town of Montverde was officially incorporated as a municipality on May 18, 1925.

The central feature of the town is Montverde Academy, a private preparatory school for primary and secondary students. The school was opened in 1912.

== Geography ==
Montverde is located on the southwest shore of Lake Apopka. It is 18 miles (29 km) south of Tavares, the Lake county seat, and 24 miles (39 km) northwest of Orlando.

According to the United States Census Bureau, the Town of Montverde has a total area of 1.9 square miles (4.9 km^{2}), of which 1.7 square miles (4.3 km^{2}) are land and 0.2 square miles (0.5 km^{2}), or 11.10%, are water.

=== Climate ===
The climate in this area is characterized by hot, humid summers and generally mild winters. According to the Köppen climate classification, the Town of Montverde has a humid subtropical climate zone (Cfa).

== Demographics ==
Historical population
Census	Pop.	Note	%±
1930	297		—
1940	312		5.1%
1950	293		−6.1%
1960	374		27.6%
1970	308		−17.6%
1980	397		28.9%
1990	890		124.2%
2000	882		−0.9%
2010	1,463		65.9%
2020	1,655		13.1%
U.S. Decennial Census

=== Racial and ethnic composition ===
Montverde racial composition (Hispanics excluded from racial categories) (NH = Non-Hispanic)
Race	Pop 2010	Pop 2020	% 2010	% 2020
White (NH)	1,231	1,264	84.14%	76.37%
Black or African American (NH)	23	76	1.57%	4.59%
Native American or Alaska Native (NH)	6	2	0.41%	0.12%
Asian (NH)	20	26	1.37%	1.57%
Pacific Islander or Native Hawaiian (NH)	0	0	0.00%	0.00%
Some other race (NH)	1	9	0.07%	0.54%
Two or more races/Multiracial (NH)	26	66	1.78%	3.99%
Hispanic or Latino (any race)	156	212	10.66%	12.81%
Total	1,463	1,655		

=== 2020 census ===
As of the 2020 census, Montverde had a population of 1,655. The median age was 47.5 years. 20.4% of residents were under the age of 18 and 19.0% were 65 years of age or older. For every 100 females there were 105.1 males, and for every 100 females age 18 and over there were 104.3 males age 18 and over.

100.0% of residents lived in urban areas, while 0.0% lived in rural areas.

There were 637 households in Montverde, of which 32.8% had children under the age of 18 living in them. Of all households, 65.0% were married-couple households, 15.9% were households with a male householder and no spouse or partner present, and 14.6% were households with a female householder and no spouse or partner present. About 18.5% of all households were made up of individuals and 6.2% had someone living alone who was 65 years of age or older.

There were 698 housing units, of which 8.7% were vacant. The homeowner vacancy rate was 2.2% and the rental vacancy rate was 13.2%.

According to the 2020 American Community Survey 5-year estimates, there were 471 families residing in the town.

=== 2010 census ===
As of the 2010 United States census, there were 1,463 people, 473 households, and 383 families residing in the town.

=== 2000 census ===
At the 2000 census there were 882 people, 351 households, and 272 families living in the town. The population density was 561.5 inhabitants per square mile (216.8/km^{2}). There were 410 housing units at an average density of 261.0 per square mile (100.8/km^{2}). The racial makeup of the town was 96.49% White, 1.59% African American, 0.23% Native American, 0.45% Asian, 0.11% from other races, and 1.13% from two or more races. Hispanic or Latino of any race were 2.61%.

Of the 351 households in 2000, 27.6% had children under the age of 18 living with them, 66.4% were married couples living together, 8.5% had a female householder with no husband present, and 22.5% were non-families. 19.7% of households were one person and 5.7% were one person aged 65 or older. The average household size was 2.51 and the average family size was 2.89.

The age distribution in 2000 was 22.3% under the age of 18, 6.8% from 18 to 24, 29.9% from 25 to 44, 27.0% from 45 to 64, and 13.9% 65 or older. The median age was 41 years. For every 100 females, there were 97.3 males. For every 100 females age 18 and over, there were 94.6 males.

In 2000, the median household income was $45,341 and the median family income was $46,813. Males had a median income of $35,774 versus $26,944 for females. The per capita income for the town was $20,504. About 4.5% of families and 5.3% of the population were below the poverty line, including 7.1% of those under age 18 and 12.0% of those age 65 or over.
