= SIMA Águilas =

Defunct American football club

- Full name: Soccer Institute at Montverde Academy Águilas
- Founded: 2013; 13 years ago
- Dissolved: 2018; 8 years ago
- Stadium: Montverde Academy Center
- Owners: Kasey Kesselring
- Head Coach: Mike Potempa
- League: United Premier Soccer League (Fall 2026)
- 2018: 1st, Southeast Division; Playoffs: Conference Final
- Website: www.mvasima.com

SIMA Águilas are an amateur soccer team based in Montverde, Florida that currently compete in United Premier Soccer League. The team is affiliated with the Montverde Academy.

== History ==
SIMA Águilas was announced as a Premier Development League expansion team on 2013, joining the Southeast Division.

== Year-by-year ==
Year	Division	League	Regular season	Playoffs	Open Cup
2017	4	USL PDL	1st, Southeast	Conference Semifinal	Did not enter
2018	4	USL PDL	1st, Southeast	Conference Final	1st Round

== Staff ==
Position	Staff
President	Kasey Kesselring
Head Coach	Mike Potempa

Last updated: June 20, 2017
Source: MVA

== Notable players ==
- (Costa Rica) Diego Campos – 2017
- (Senegal) Malick Mbaye – 2017
- (South Korea) Seo-In Kim – 2018
- (United States) Randy Mendoza – 2018
