= Orlando City B =

American soccer team

- Full name: Orlando City B
- Nicknames: Lions, OCB
- Founded: June 30, 2015 (11 years ago)
- Stadium: Osceola County Stadium; Kissimmee, Florida
- Capacity: 5,400
- Owner: Orlando City SC
- Head coach: Edward Wilding
- League: MLS Next Pro
- 2026: 10th, Eastern Conference; Playoffs: DNQ
- Website: www.orlandocitysc.com/ocb
Home colors	Away colors

Orlando City B (or OCB for short) is an American soccer club that began play in 2016 and currently plays in MLS Next Pro. Owned by Orlando City SC and based at the Orlando City training facility in Kissimmee, the club plays its home games at Osceola County Stadium.

The club played in multiple leagues, beginning with the United Soccer League, the second tier of the US soccer pyramid in 2016 and 2017, before electing to forgo the 2018 season and join the newly formed third division, USL League One, in its inaugural 2019 season. After another season on hiatus in 2021, the team became an inaugural member of MLS Next Pro.

== History ==
=== United Soccer League ===
On June 30, 2015, Orlando City SC announced that they would operate a USL club starting in 2016 in the Central Florida area. The team would be their direct USL affiliate, and Orlando City and Louisville City (their USL affiliate club for 2015) had negotiated a "long-term formal partnership" to replace their affiliation arrangement.

Orlando City also announced that Anthony Pulis would coach the new team. Pulis was a player for Orlando City SC's USL club from 2011 to 2014 and is the son of Tony Pulis, manager of numerous English Premier League sides. On August 11, 2015, Arizona United announced that Rob Valentino would retire from playing to take the assistant coach role for Orlando's new USL team.

On October 15, 2015, the club was officially branded Orlando City B, with home games to be played in Melbourne at the Titan Soccer Complex on the campus of Eastern Florida State College. In addition, OCB announced its first ever player signings: defenders Mikey Ambrose and Kyle Callan-McFadden, and midfielder Tony Rocha.

On August 12, 2016, in a game against New York Red Bulls II, Orlando City B participated in the first competitive match in North America to employ Video Assistant Referee technology. They finished their debut season 8th in the Eastern Conference, the final qualifying spot for playoffs. They lost in the Conference Quarterfinal to New York Red Bulls II 4–0.

In November 2016 it was announced that OCB would be moving to the newly opened Orlando City Stadium in time for the 2017 season. The team finished the season in 9th place, two points short of the playoffs, but finished one place higher in the overall standings than their debut season.

On January 12, 2018, the organization declared its intention to forgo the 2018 season as they continued to assess their minor league participation, a move that had looked likely by this point with OCB only having one player under contract and lacking a manager following Anthony Pulis' departure for Saint Louis FC in November.

=== USL League One ===
In June 2018, the club announced it was to become a founding member of USL's new third-tier league, USL League One, scheduled to begin play in 2019. It was hoped the move would lead OCB to better act as an upward transitional stepping-stone between Orlando City's Development Academy and the senior MLS team. On October 3, 2018, Fernando De Argila was announced as head coach. He had previously been head coach and director of methodology at the Soccer Institute at Montverde Academy. After winning only three of the opening 19 games, De Argila was sacked in July 2019. Roberto Sibaja acted as interim head coach from the rest of the season as the team finished in last place.

In May 2019, the team announced plans to relocate OCB as part of a wider vision to house all of Orlando City's development pyramid at the same location for the first time, creating a 20-acre training complex at Osceola Heritage Park to house the senior MLS team, OCB and Development Academy. Orlando City B will play their matches at the new site starting in the 2020 season following the departure of minor league baseball team Florida Fire Frogs. Ahead of the season it was announced Orlando City Academy Director Marcelo Neveleff would be the team's new head coach.

In October 2020, the team announced it was withdrawing from USL1 at the end of the season with a possibility of an MLS reserve league launching in 2021.

=== MLS Next Pro ===
After spending the 2021 season on hiatus, the club announced on December 6, 2021, that it was joining the inaugural 21-team MLS Next Pro season starting in 2022.

== Location ==
Tim Holt, Orlando's vice president of development, said that they would be looking for a stadium in Central Florida in order to facilitate the training of emerging players with the MLS team. Holt was the president of USL until May 2015. Eastern Florida State College's stadium was visited by team personnel as a possible location.

On August 21, 2015, the VP for athletics at Eastern Florida State College claimed in a pitch to the Brevard County Tourist Development Council's Sports Commission that the college's Titan Soccer Complex and a stadium in Deland were among the finalists to host games for the USL team. Said plan was approved and the Titan Sports Complex at ECSC was OCB's official home venue for the 2016 season.

For the 2017 season in the USL, Orlando City B moved to Orlando City's newly built home stadium, Orlando City Stadium.

For the 2019 season in USL League One, the team moved to Montverde Academy.

In 2020, as part of a club-wide move, the team relocated again, this time to the new Orlando City training facility at Osceola Heritage Park alongside both the senior MLS team and Development Academy. Matches are played at the complex's newly converted 5,400 seat Osceola County Stadium.

== Players and staff ==
=== Roster ===
As of October 8, 2026

No.	Pos.	Nation	Player
36	DF	DMA	Titus Sandy Jr
38	MF	GHA	Issah Haruna
52	DF	USA	Parker Amoo-Mensah
54	DF	ESP	Albright Chikamso
61	DF	USA	Jackson Platts
66	FW	USA	Matthew Belgodere
70	MF	USA	Justin Hylton
72	DF	USA	Landon Okonski
99	GK	VEN	Juan Rojas

=== Staff ===
Executive
Chairman and majority owner	Mark Wilf
General manager	Ricardo Moreira
Coaching staff
Head coach	Edward Wilding
Assistant coach	Julian Vergara
Goalkeeper coach	Johan Escalante
Strength and conditioning coach	Andres Gonzalez

== Year-by-year ==
As of September 20, 2026

Year	Division	League	P	W	D	L	GF	GA	Pts	Position		Playoffs
Year	Division	League	P	W	D	L	GF	GA	Pts	Conf.	Overall	Playoffs
2016	3	USL	30	9	8	13	35	49	35	8th	19th	First round
2017	2	USL	32	10	12	10	37	36	42	9th	18th	DNQ
2018	On hiatus											
2019	3	USL1	28	4	4	20	23	52	16	N/A	10th	DNQ
2020	3	USL1	15	1	3	11	10	29	6	N/A	11th	DNQ
2021	On hiatus											
2022	3	MLSNP	24	6	5	13	40	53	25	9th	18th	DNQ
2023	3	MLSNP	28	13	5	10	59	61	46	5th	10th	Conference Quarterfinals
2024	3	MLSNP	28	11	9	8	53	42	46	5th	9th	Conference Quarterfinals
2025	3	MLSNP	28	9	6	13	38	55	37	12th	22nd	DNQ
2026	3	MLSNP	28	11	7	10	55	56	44	10th	16th	DNQ

=== Head coaches ===
- Only competitive games counted. Includes USL regular season and playoffs.

As of matches played September 20, 2026

All-time Orlando City B coaching stats
Name	Nationality	From	To	P	W	D	L	GF	GA	Win% (Note: Win% is rounded to two decimal places)
Anthony Pulis	Wales	June 30, 2015	November 20, 2017	63	19	20	24	72	89	30.16
Fernando De Argila	Spain	October 3, 2018	July 25, 2019	19	3	4	12	16	33	15.79
Roberto Sibaja (interim)	Costa Rica	July 25, 2019	December 20, 2019	9	1	0	8	7	19	11.11
Marcelo Neveleff	Argentina	December 20, 2019	October 16, 2020	15	1	3	11	10	29	6.67
Martín Perelman	Argentina	March 9, 2022	March 11, 2024	53	19	10	24	100	116	35.85
Manuel Goldberg	Argentina	March 11, 2024	March 10, 2026	57	20	15	22	92	98	35.09
Julian Vergara (interim)	United States	March 10, 2026	April 8, 2026	4	2	1	1	10	10	50.00
Edward Wilding	England	April 9, 2026	present	24	9	6	9	45	46	37.50
Total				130	30	32	68	145	223	23.08
