= 2019 Richmond Kickers season =

Richmond Kickers
2019 season
- Owner: 22 Holdings, LLC
- Head coach: David Bulow
- Stadium: City Stadium
- USL League One: 9th
- U.S. Open Cup: Second round (knocked out by North Carolina FC)
- Top goalscorer: League: Joe Gallardo (6); All: Joe Gallardo (6)
- Highest home attendance: 5,936 (March 30 vs. Lansing)
- Lowest home attendance: 727 (May 7 vs. Virginia United, USOC)
- Average home league attendance: 3,468
- Biggest win: 6–2 (May 7 vs. Virginia United, USOC)
- Biggest defeat: 0–4 (September 10 at North Texas SC)
Home colors	Away colors

The 2019 Richmond Kickers season is a soccer club based in Richmond, Virginia. It was the club's 27th season of existence, their 15th season in the third tier of American soccer, and their first season in the newly created USL League One. It was the Kickers' first season playing in the third tier of American soccer since 2016, when they were in the United Soccer League. The season covers the period from October 14, 2018, to the beginning of the 2020 USL League One season.

== Roster ==
As of match played June 22, 2019

No.	Name	Nationality	Position(s)	Date of birth (age)	Signed in	Previous club	Apps	Goals
Goalkeepers
1	Akira Fitzgerald	(Japan)	GK	July 17, 1987 (age 39)	2019	(United States) Tampa Bay Rowdies	15	0
23	Joe Rice	(United States)	GK	March 6, 1996 (age 30)	2019	(United States) VCU Rams	0	0
94	Matt Broomall	(United States)	GK	April 20, 1994 (age 32)	2019	(United States) Atlantic City FC	0	0
Defenders
3	Scott Thomsen	(United States)	DF	December 31, 1993 (age 32)	2018	(United States) Orlando City B	40	2
4	Ivan Magalhães	(Brazil)	DF	December 23, 1993 (age 32)	2019	(United States) Tampa Bay Rowdies	9	0
5	Conor Shanosky	(United States)	DF	December 13, 1991 (age 34)	2016	(United States) Louisville City	95	5
17	Eli Lockaby	(United States)	DF	December 18, 1995 (age 30)	2019	(United States) VCU Rams	12	2
18	Wahab Ackwei	(Ghana)	DF	October 19, 1996 (age 29)	2019	(United States) New York Red Bulls II	13	1
20	Luke Pavone	(United States)	DF	March 29, 1995 (age 31)	2019	(Israel) Hapoel Petah Tikva	3	0
24	Sam Moore	(United States)	DF	March 16, 2001 (age 25)	2019	(United States) Richmond United	0	0
31	Braeden Troyer	(United States)	DF	March 19, 1993 (age 33)	2015	(United States) South Carolina Gamecocks	124	0
Midfielders
7	Josh Hughes	(United States)	MF	November 3, 1991 (age 34)	2019	(United States) Nashville SC	12	1
8	Amass Amankona	(Ghana)	MF	August 2, 1995 (age 31)	2019	(United States) Indy Eleven	2	0
11	Matt Bolduc	(United States)	MF	October 12, 1994 (age 31)	2017	(United States) Harrisburg City Islanders	39	2
12	Alex Ainscough	(United States)	MF	April 12, 1995 (age 31)	2019	(Germany) SpVgg Bayreuth	4	0
14	Nick Retzlaff	(United States)	MF	September 3, 1996 (age 30)	2019	(United States) NC State Wolfpack	6	0
16	Justin Grove	(United States)	MF	November 7, 1988 (age 37)	2019	(United States) Charlottesville Alliance	2	0
21	Maxi Rodriguez	(United States)	MF	August 9, 1995 (age 31)	2019	(United States) San Antonio FC	13	1
22	Jannik Eckenrode	(United States)	MF	December 13, 1995 (age 30)	2019	(Denmark) Jammerbugt	6	0
28	Greg Boehme	(United States)	MF	July 7, 1995 (age 31)	2018	(United States) VCU Rams	17	0
77	Charles Boateng	(Ghana)	MF	July 28, 1997 (age 29)	2019	(Ghana) WAFA SC (loan)	9	4
80	Mutaya Mwape	(Zambia)	MF	June 19, 1996 (age 30)	2019	(United States) Charlotte Independence	12	1
97	Lucas Mendes	(United States)	MF	December 29, 1997 (age 28)	2019	(United States) FC Baltimore	2	0
Forwards
9	Daniel Jackson	(United States)	FW	July 10, 1989 (age 37)	2019	(Finland) Bollklubben-46	13	2
10	Joe Gallardo	(United States)	FW	January 1, 1998 (age 28)	2019	(United States) SIMA Águilas	15	4
15	Dennis Chin	(Jamaica)	FW	June 4, 1987 (age 39)	2019	(United States) Pittsburgh Riverhounds SC	11	2

== Non-competitive ==
=== Preseason ===
On January 19, 2019, the Kickers revealed their preseason schedule. Richmond played seven matches in the span of just over a month, including five games against collegiate programs and two games against clubs from the USL Championship. All six games took place in the state of Virginia, with the Kickers playing host to five of those games; just one, however, was played at City Stadium.

February 16 Friendly	Richmond Kickers	0–0	VCU Rams	Richmond, VA
2:00 PM EST		Report		Stadium: Ukrop Park

February 22 Friendly	Bethlehem Steel FC	0–3	Richmond Kickers	Leesburg, VA
1:00 PM EST		Report	Jackson 31'; Mwape 58'; Bolduc 90+1' (pen.)	Stadium: Evergreen Sportsplex

February 27 Friendly	Richmond Kickers	2–3	Loudoun United	Richmond, VA
1:00 PM EST	Jackson 20'; Trialist 81'	Report	Sinclair 22'; Kadono 67'; Lubahn 75'	Stadium: Ukrop Park

March 3 Friendly	Richmond Kickers	2–2	Old Dominion Monarchs	Richmond, VA
6:00 PM EST	Hughes 10'; Trialist 37' (pen.)	Report	Mylonas 1'; Bloyou 89'	Stadium: Ukrop Park; Attendance: 50

March 9 Friendly	Richmond Kickers	2–4	Virginia Cavaliers	Richmond, VA
4:00 PM EST	Rodriguez 45'; Mwape 66'	Report	Crofts 6', 32', 42'; 80' (pen.)	Stadium: City Stadium

March 17 Friendly	Richmond Kickers	2–2	James Madison Dukes	Richmond, VA
6:00 PM EST	Jackson 16'; Gallardo 27' (pen.)	Report	37'; 57'	Stadium: Ukrop Park

March 23 Friendly	Richmond Kickers	0–0 (a.e.t.)	VCU Rams	Richmond, VA
7:00 PM EST		Report		Stadium: Ukrop Park

=== Midseason ===
July 9 Friendly	Lionsbridge FC	0–5	Richmond Kickers	Newport News, VA
7:00 PM EDT		Report	Boehme 2'; Gallardo 18'; Eckenrode 43'; Boateng 74'; Levengood 83'	Stadium: Pomoco Stadium; Attendance: 1,326

== Competitive ==
=== USL League One ===
==== Standings ====
Pos	Team	Pld	W	D	L	GF	GA	GD	Pts
6	South Georgia Tormenta FC	28	9	10	9	32	34	−2	37
7	Toronto FC II	28	9	9	10	43	46	−3	36
8	FC Tucson	28	8	9	11	35	41	−6	33
9	Richmond Kickers	28	9	5	14	26	35	−9	32
10	Orlando City B	28	4	4	20	23	52	−29	16

Source: 2019 USL League One standings
Rules for classification: 1) total wins; 2) total goal differential; 3) total goals scored; 4) points earned against top four Conference finishers; 5) disciplinary points; 6) coin toss or drawing of lots

==== Results by round ====
Round	1	2	3	4	5	6	7	8	9	10	11	12	13	14	15	16	17	18	19	20	21	22	23	24	25	26	27	28
Stadium	H	H	A	A	H	H	H	A	A	H	A	H	A	A	H	H	A	A	H	A	A	H	A	H	A	A	H	H
Result	L	D	L	W	W	D	W	L	L	L	D	L	L	L	L	W	W	W	D	L	W	W	L	L	D	L	L	W
Position	6	8	9	9	7	4	3	4	5	8	8	10	9	9	9	9	9	9	9	9	8	8	8	9	8	9	9	9

Source: Richmond schedule
A = Away; H = Home; W = Win; D = Draw; L = Loss

==== Match results ====
On December 7, 2018, the league announced the home openers for its inaugural season. Richmond's first-ever match in the league will take place on March 30, 2019, with the Kickers playing host to Lansing Ignite. Richmond will also take part in the home-opening match for Lansing, visiting Cooley Law School Stadium on April 13.

The remainder of the league schedule was released on December 10, 2018. The inaugural USL League One season will consist of 28 matches for the Kickers, with Richmond playing four times against Chattanooga Red Wolves and three times against every other opponent. Richmond will renew their series with Orlando City B and Toronto FC II, both of whom they previously faced in the United Soccer League; they will face all seven other teams for the first time.

March 30 1	Richmond Kickers	2–3	Lansing Ignite	Richmond, VA
5:00 PM EDT	Gallardo (yellow card) 25', (goal) 76' (pen.); Rodriguez 68'; Eckenrode (yellow card) 72'	Report	Moshobane 19'; Gomez 27'; Coiffic (yellow card) 32', (goal) 49'; Carr (yellow card) 63'; Stoneman (yellow card) 75'; Cerda (yellow card) 86'	Stadium: City Stadium; Attendance: 5,936; Referee: Danielle Chesky

April 6 2	Richmond Kickers	0–0	South Georgia Tormenta	Richmond, VA
5:00 PM EDT	Ackwei (yellow card) 80'	Report	Phelps (yellow card) 29'; Pando (yellow card) 68'	Stadium: City Stadium; Attendance: 2,853; Referee: Kevin Broadley

April 13 3	Lansing Ignite	3–1	Richmond Kickers	Lansing, MI
7:00 PM EDT	Moon 47'; Bruce 55'; Stoneman 70'	Report	Rodriguez (yellow card) 27' (yellow-red card) 34'; Chin 67'; Bolduc (yellow card) 82'	Stadium: Cooley Law School Stadium; Attendance: 3,369; Referee: Donovan Noocha

April 20 4	Greenville Triumph	0–1	Richmond Kickers	Greenville, SC
7:00 PM EDT	Seiler (yellow card) 14'; Clowes (yellow card) 81'	Report	Gallardo 49'; Mwape (yellow card) 58'; Bolduc (yellow card) 78'; Hughes (yellow card) 90'	Stadium: Legacy Early College Stadium; Attendance: 2,168; Referee: David Erbacher

April 27 5	Richmond Kickers	1–0	Chattanooga Red Wolves	Richmond, VA
7:00 PM EDT	Gallardo (yellow card) 32', (goal) 52'	Report	Doyle (yellow card) 20'; Moullin (yellow card) 28'; Zayed (yellow card) 37'	Stadium: City Stadium; Attendance: 2,743; Referee: Ekaterina Koroleva

May 4 6	Richmond Kickers	2–2	Lansing Ignite	Richmond, VA
7:00 PM EDT	Chin 32'; Shanosky (yellow card) 75'; Jackson 90'	Report	Cerda (yellow card) 24'; Stoneman (yellow card) 27'; Lopez-Espin 58'; Fricke 70'	Stadium: City Stadium; Attendance: 2,947; Referee: Matt Franz

May 11 7	Richmond Kickers	2–0	FC Tucson	Richmond, VA
7:00 PM EDT	Keita (yellow card) 32'; Ackwei (yellow card) 68'; Gallardo 83'; Mwape (yellow card) 85', (goal) 90+6'	Report	Hauswirth (yellow card) 55'; Sousa (yellow card) 82'	Stadium: City Stadium; Attendance: 1,089; Referee: Danielle Chesky

May 18 8	Greenville Triumph	1–0	Richmond Kickers	Greenville, SC
7:00 PM EDT	Hemmings (yellow card) 13'; Keegan 42'	Report	Shanosky (yellow card) 59'; Lockaby (yellow card) 81'; Boateng (yellow card) 90'	Stadium: Legacy Early College Stadium; Attendance: 2,356; Referee: Tori Penso

May 22 9	Orlando City B	3–2	Richmond Kickers	Montverde, FL
7:30 PM EDT	Tablante 4'; Sérginho 27'; Rafael (yellow card) 35'; Amer (yellow card) 37'; Léo (yellow card) 76'; Thiago 85' (pen.)	Report	Hughes (yellow card) 22', (goal) 81'; Lockaby 35'; Rodriguez (yellow card) 51'; Bolduc (yellow card) 70'; Fitzgerald (yellow card) 86'	Stadium: Montverde Academy Stadium; Attendance: 148; Referee: Jamie Willis

June 1 10	Richmond Kickers	0–3	North Texas SC	Richmond, VA
7:00 PM EDT	Gallardo (yellow card) 81'; Boateng (yellow card) 88'; Thomsen (yellow card) 90'	Report	Sealy 27', (yellow card) 50'; Jatta (yellow card) 55'; Pepi 63'; D. Rodriguez 68'	Stadium: City Stadium; Attendance: 4,514; Referee: Jasmine Peralta

June 8 11	FC Tucson	0–0	Richmond Kickers	Tucson, AZ
5:30 PM EDT	Jones (yellow card) 33'	Report	Rodriguez (yellow card) 24'; Eckenrode (yellow card) 90+1'	Stadium: Kino Sports Complex North Stadium; Attendance: 915; Referee: Samantha Martinez

June 15 12	Richmond Kickers	0–2	Chattanooga Red Wolves	Richmond, VA
7:00 PM EDT	Mwape (yellow card) 43'; Gallardo (yellow card) 90+2'	Report	Mare (yellow card) 41'; Pineda 63'; Caparelli (yellow card) 73'; Soto (yellow card) 90+1'; Seoane 90+2'	Stadium: City Stadium; Attendance: 4,233; Referee: Joshua Encarnacion

June 22 13	South Georgia Tormenta	1–0	Richmond Kickers	Statesboro, GA
8:00 PM EDT	Morrell (yellow card) 79'; Micaletto 84' (pen.)	Report	Eckenrode (yellow card) 45+1'; Troyer (yellow card) 54'; Hughes (yellow card) 73'; Shanosky (yellow card) 85' (yellow-red card) 87'	Stadium: Eagle Field; Attendance: 1,602; Referee: Natalie Simon

June 29 14	Chattanooga Red Wolves	1–0	Richmond Kickers	Chattanooga, TN
7:00 PM EDT	Beattie 7'; Walls (yellow card) 11'; Cisse (yellow card) 45+1'	Report	Ainscough (yellow card) 18'; Troyer (yellow card) 53'; Ackwei (yellow card) 53'; Boateng (yellow card) 57'; Magalhães (yellow card) 86'	Stadium: David Stanton Field; Attendance: 1,572; Referee: Nickrod Fateh

July 13 15	Richmond Kickers	0–2	North Texas SC	Richmond, VA
7:00 PM EDT	Rodriguez (yellow card) 42'; Ackwei (yellow card) 57'; Eckenrode (yellow card) 65' (yellow-red card) 89'	Report	Roberts 11', (yellow card) 81'; Montgomery 14'	Stadium: City Stadium; Attendance: 3,321; Referee: Jonathan Bilinski

July 20 16	Richmond Kickers	1–0	Orlando City B	Richmond, VA
7:00 PM EDT	Magalhães (yellow card) 31'; Troyer (yellow card) 68'; Chin 70'; Fitzgerald (red card) 83'	Report	Tablante (yellow card) 44'; Diouf (yellow card) 78'; Bagrou (red card) 83'; Mendoza (red card) 83'	Stadium: City Stadium; Attendance: 2,543; Referee: Gabriele Giusti

July 26 17	Toronto FC II	1–2	Richmond Kickers	Toronto, ON
4:00 PM EDT	Ovalle (yellow card) 17'; Srbely 19'; Mohammad (yellow card) 39'; Petrasso (yellow card) 90+1'	Report	Klenofsky 35' (o.g.); Hughes 48'; Bolduc (yellow card) 88'	Stadium: BMO Training Ground; Referee: Nicolas Joubert

August 10 18	Forward Madison	0–1	Richmond Kickers	Madison, WI
6:00 PM EDT	Bement (yellow card) 81'; Leonard (yellow card) 84'	Report	Ackwei (yellow card) 48'; Jackson 69'; Troyer (yellow card) 76'	Stadium: Breese Stevens Field; Attendance: 4,510; Referee: Calin Radosav

August 17 19	Richmond Kickers	2–2	Toronto FC II	Richmond, VA
7:00 PM EDT	Jackson 5', 23'; Ackwei (yellow card) 55'; Bolduc (yellow card) 81'	Report	Priso-Mbongue (yellow card) 38'; Perruzza 53'; Srbely (yellow card) 59'; Mohammed 87'; Ovalle (yellow card) 90+2'	Stadium: City Stadium; Attendance: 4,041; Referee: John Griggs

August 24 20	Forward Madison	1–0	Richmond Kickers	Madison, WI
6:00 PM EDT	Díaz 74'	Report	Mwape (yellow card) 78'	Stadium: Breese Stevens Field; Attendance: 4,517; Referee: Joshua Encarnación

August 31 21	South Georgia Tormenta	1–4	Richmond Kickers	Statesboro, GA
8:00 PM EDT	Rowe 5'; Wells (yellow card) 28'; Antley (yellow card) 57'	Report	Chin 11', 36'; Gallardo 15', (yellow card) 41', (goal) 80'	Stadium: Eagle Field; Attendance: 1,526; Referee: Alyssa Nichols

September 7 22	Richmond Kickers	1–0	Greenville Triumph	Richmond, VA
7:00 PM EDT	Troyer 45+1', (yellow card) 53'	Report	Polak (yellow card) 27'; Walker (yellow card) 45+5'; Robinson (yellow card) 72'	Stadium: City Stadium; Attendance: 3,624; Referee: Nickrod Fateh

September 10 23	North Texas SC	4–0	Richmond Kickers	Frisco, TX
EDT	Damus 1', 30', 77'; A. Rodriguez 70'; Danso (yellow card) 75'	Report	Thomsen (yellow card) 61'; Ackwei (yellow card) 90+1'	Stadium: Toyota Stadium; Attendance: 725; Referee: Samantha Martinez

September 14 24	Richmond Kickers	0–1	Forward Madison	Richmond, VA
7:00 PM EDT	Magalhães (yellow card) 65'; Troyer (yellow card) 78'	Report	Tenorio 6'; Omsberg (yellow card) 52'	Stadium: City Stadium; Attendance: 4,140; Referee: Gabriele Giusti

September 21 25	FC Tucson	0–0	Richmond Kickers	Tucson, AZ
5:30 PM EDT	Venter (yellow card) 55' (yellow-red card) 74'; Howell (yellow card) 70'	Report	Gallardo (yellow card) 38'; Ackwei (yellow card) 81' (yellow-red card) 87'; Shanosky (red card) 84'	Stadium: Kino Sports Complex North Stadium; Attendance: 640; Referee: Reyna Fonseca

September 28 26	Chattanooga Red Wolves	2–1	Richmond Kickers	Chattanooga, TN
7:00 PM EDT	Ualefi 24' (pen.); Seoane 32'; Kendall-Moullin (yellow card) 37'; Zguro (yellow card) 44'; Walls (yellow card) 73'; Jaimes (yellow card) 88'	Report	Troyer (red card) 23'; Eckenrode (yellow card) 28'; Boateng 65'; Rodriguez (yellow card) 90+6'	Stadium: David Stanton Field; Attendance: 235; Referee: Joshua Encarnación

October 2 27	Richmond Kickers	1–2	Toronto FC II	Richmond, VA
7:00 PM EDT	Mwape 9'; Boateng (yellow card) 45+2'; Shanosky (yellow card) 49'	Report	Perruzza 13', 52'; Okello (yellow card) 28'; Bunk-Andersen (yellow card) 45+2'; Mingo (yellow card) 55' (yellow-red card) 90+3'; Akinola (yellow card) 59'; Carlini (yellow card) 78'	Stadium: City Stadium; Attendance: 2,752; Referee: Natalie Simon

October 5 28	Richmond Kickers	2–0	Orlando City B	Richmond, VA
7:00 PM EDT	Shanosky 31'; Boateng 36', (yellow card) 81'; Fitzgerald (yellow card) 90+4'	Report	Hummel (yellow card) 38'; Rafael (yellow card) 69'; Léo (yellow card) 90+1'; Bagrou (yellow card) 90+1'	Stadium: City Stadium; Attendance: 3,819; Referee: Adorae Whitesel

=== U.S. Open Cup ===
As a member of USL League One, the Kickers entered the tournament in the First Round, playing on May 7, 2019.

May 7 First round	Richmond Kickers (Virginia)	6–2	Virginia United	Richmond, VA
7:00 PM EDT	Boateng 17', 23', 55', 75'; Jackson (yellow card) 37', (goal) 48'; Lockaby 43'; Grove (yellow card) 49'	Report	Gibbons (yellow card) 9'; El. Martinez 28'; Majano 90'	Stadium: City Stadium; Attendance: 727; Referee: Nicholas Barbera

May 15 Second round	North Carolina FC	4–1	(Virginia) Richmond Kickers	Cary, NC
7:00 PM EDT	Fortune 10', (yellow card) 53'; McCabe (yellow card) 47'; Kristo 52', 62' (pen.); Chester 70'; Wapiwo (yellow card) 82'	Report	Ackwei 34', (yellow card) 61'	Stadium: Sahlen's Stadium; Attendance: 1,553; Referee: Joshua Escobar

== Statistics ==
=== Appearances and goals ===
No.	Pos	Nat	Player	Total		USL1		U.S. Open Cup	
No.	Pos	Nat	Player	Apps	Goals	Apps	Goals	Apps	Goals
1	GK	(Japan) JPN	Akira Fitzgerald	28	0	26	0	2	0
3	DF	(United States) USA	Scott Thomsen	13	0	11	0	2	0
4	DF	(Brazil) BRA	Ivan Magalhães	9	0	4+3	0	2	0
5	DF	(United States) USA	Conor Shanosky	23	1	18+4	1	1	0
7	MF	(United States) USA	Josh Hughes	23	2	17+5	2	0+1	0
8	MF	(Ghana) GHA	Amass Amankona	2	0	2	0	0	0
9	FW	(United States) USA	Daniel Jackson	23	5	15+7	4	1	1
10	FW	(United States) USA	Joe Gallardo	27	6	25	6	2	0
11	MF	(United States) USA	Matt Bolduc	21	0	17+3	0	1	0
12	MF	(United States) USA	Alex Ainscough	5	0	2+2	0	0+1	0
14	MF	(United States) USA	Nick Retzlaff	8	0	5+1	0	2	0
15	FW	(Jamaica) JAM	Dennis Chin	23	5	19+4	5	0	0
16	MF	(United States) USA	Justin Grove	4	0	0+3	0	0+1	0
17	DF	(United States) USA	Eli Lockaby	25	2	22+1	1	1+1	1
18	DF	(Ghana) GHA	Wahab Ackwei	26	1	25	0	1	1
20	DF	(United States) USA	Luke Pavone	5	0	0+4	0	0+1	0
21	MF	(United States) USA	Maxi Rodriguez	24	1	19+4	1	1	0
22	MF	(United States) USA	Jannik Eckenrode	13	0	5+8	0	0	0
23	GK	(United States) USA	Joe Rice	3	0	2+1	0	0	0
24	DF	(United States) USA	Sam Moore	1	0	0+1	0	0	0
25	FW	(United States) USA	Key White	1	0	0+1	0	0	0
27	DF	(United States) USA	Zach Perez	1	0	1	0	0	0
28	MF	(United States) USA	Greg Boehme	8	0	6+1	0	1	0
31	DF	(United States) USA	Braeden Troyer	20	1	13+5	1	2	0
77	MF	(Ghana) GHA	Charles Boateng	17	6	7+8	2	2	4
80	MF	(Zambia) ZAM	Mutaya Mwape	25	2	18+5	2	1+1	0
94	GK	(United States) USA	Matt Broomall	0	0	0	0	0	0
97	MF	(United States) USA	Lucas Mendes	2	0	0+2	0	0	0
98	MF	(United States) USA	Ryley Kraft	8	0	4+4	0	0	0
Players who left Richmond during the season:
2	DF	(United States) USA	Aboubacar Keita	3	0	2+1	0	0	0

=== Disciplinary record ===
No.	Pos.	Name	USL1		U.S. Open Cup		Total	
No.	Pos.	Name	Booked	Sent off (straight red)	Booked	Sent off (straight red)	Booked	Sent off (straight red)
1	GK	(Japan) Akira Fitzgerald	2	1	0	0	2	1
3	DF	(United States) Scott Thomsen	2	0	0	0	2	0
4	DF	(Brazil) Ivan Magalhães	3	0	0	0	3	0
5	DF	(United States) Conor Shanosky	3	2	0	0	3	2
7	MF	(United States) Josh Hughes	3	0	0	0	3	0
9	FW	(United States) Daniel Jackson	0	0	1	0	1	0
10	FW	(United States) Joe Gallardo	6	0	0	0	6	0
11	MF	(United States) Matt Bolduc	5	0	0	0	5	0
12	MF	(United States) Alex Ainscough	1	0	0	0	1	0
16	MF	(United States) Justin Grove	0	0	1	0	1	0
17	DF	(United States) Eli Lockaby	1	0	0	0	1	0
18	DF	(Ghana) Wahab Ackwei	7	1	1	0	8	1
21	MF	(United States) Maxi Rodriguez	4	1	0	0	4	1
22	MF	(United States) Jannik Eckenrode	4	1	0	0	4	1
31	DF	(United States) Braeden Troyer	6	1	0	0	6	1
77	MF	(Ghana) Charles Boateng	5	0	0	0	5	0
80	MF	(Zambia) Mutaya Mwape	4	0	0	0	4	0
Players who left Richmond during the season:
2	DF	(United States) Aboubacar Keita	1	0	0	0	1	0

=== Clean sheets ===
No.	Name	USL1	U.S. Open Cup	Total	Games Played		
No.	Name	1	(Japan) Akira Fitzgerald	9	0	9	26
23	(United States) Joe Rice	0	0	0	3		
94	(United States) Matt Broomall	0	0	0	0		

== Transfers ==
=== In ===
Pos.	Player	Transferred from	Fee/notes	Date	Source
MF	(United States) Josh Hughes	(United States) Nashville SC	Signed to a one-year contract.	Jan 2, 2019	
MF	(Ghana) Amass Amankona	(United States) Indy Eleven	Signed to a one-year contract.	Jan 4, 2019	
FW	(Jamaica) Dennis Chin	(United States) Pittsburgh Riverhounds SC	Signed to a one-year contract.	Jan 7, 2019	
DF	(United States) Eli Lockaby	(United States) VCU Rams	Signed to a one-year contract.	Jan 18, 2019	
MF	(Zambia) Mutaya Mwape	(United States) Charlotte Independence	Signed to a one-year contract.	Jan 21, 2019	
GK	(Japan) Akira Fitzgerald	(United States) Tampa Bay Rowdies	Signed to a one-year contract.	Feb 6, 2019	
FW	(United States) Daniel Jackson	(Finland) Bollklubben-46	Signed to a one-year contract.	Feb 11, 2019	
MF	(United States) Maxi Rodriguez	(United States) San Antonio FC	Signed to a one-year contract.	Feb 22, 2019	
MF	(United States) Jannik Eckenrode	(Denmark) Jammerbugt	Signed to a one-year contract.	Feb 27, 2019	
DF	(Brazil) Ivan Magalhães	(United States) Tampa Bay Rowdies	Signed to a one-year contract.	Mar 19, 2019	
GK	(United States) Matt Broomall	(United States) Atlantic City FC	Signed to a one-year contract.	Mar 20, 2019	
DF	(United States) Sam Moore	(United States) Richmond United	Signed to a USL Academy contract.	Mar 20, 2019	
GK	(United States) Joe Rice	(United States) VCU Rams	Signed to a one-year contract.	Mar 20, 2019	
DF	(Ghana) Wahab Ackwei	(United States) New York Red Bulls II	Signed to a one-year contract.	Mar 21, 2019	
MF	(United States) Alex Ainscough	(Germany) SpVgg Bayreuth	Signed to a one-year contract.	Mar 21, 2019	
FW	(United States) Joe Gallardo	(United States) SIMA Águilas	Signed to a one-year contract.	Mar 21, 2019	
MF	(United States) Nick Retzlaff	(United States) NC State Wolfpack	Signed to a one-year contract.	Mar 21, 2019	
MF	(United States) Justin Grove	(United States) Charlottesville Alliance	Signed to a one-year contract.	Mar 22, 2019	
MF	(United States) Lucas Mendes	(United States) FC Baltimore	Signed to a one-year contract.	Mar 22, 2019	
DF	(United States) Luke Pavone	(Israel) Hapoel Petah Tikva	Signed to a one-year contract.	Mar 22, 2019	
FW	(United States) Key White	(United States) Richmond United	Signed to a USL Academy contract.	Jul 12, 2019	
MF	(United States) Ryley Kraft	(United States) OKC Energy FC	Signed to a contract until the end of the season.	Aug 23, 2019	
DF	(United States) Zach Perez	(United States) William Paterson University	Signed to a contract until the end of the season.	Sep 5, 2019	

=== Loan in ===
Pos.	Player	Parent club	Length/Notes	Beginning	End	Source
DF	(United States) Aboubacar Keita	(United States) Columbus Crew SC	Duration of the 2019 USL League One season.	Mar 6, 2019	Jun 23, 2019	
MF	(Ghana) Charles Boateng	(Ghana) WAFA SC	Duration of the 2019 USL League One season.	Mar 18, 2019		

=== Out ===
Pos.	Player	Transferred to	Fee/notes	Date	Source
MF	(Ghana) Prince Agyemang	(Latvia) FK Liepāja	Contract expired. Signed for Liepāja on Jan 9, 2019.	Oct 14, 2018	
MF	(United States) Sam Bacon	(United States) Elon Phoenix	Academy contract expired. Committed to play college soccer at Elon.	Oct 14, 2018	
GK	(United States) Brandon Barnes	(United States) Forward Madison	Contract expired. Signed for Madison on Apr 2, 2019.	Oct 14, 2018	
FW	(Cuba) Heviel Cordovés	(United States) Memphis 901	Contract expired. Signed for Memphis on Nov 12, 2018.	Oct 14, 2018	
GK	(United States) Kent Dickey	(United States) Villanova Wildcats	Academy contract expired. Committed to play college soccer at Villanova.	Oct 14, 2018	
MF	(United States) Brandon Eaton	(United States) Forward Madison	Contract expired. Signed for Madison on Jan 30, 2019.	Oct 14, 2018	
FW	(Brazil) Luiz Fernando	(United States) Atlanta United 2	Contract expired. Signed for Atlanta on Nov 19, 2018.	Oct 14, 2018	
FW	(United States) Giuseppe Gentile	(United States) Hartford Athletic	Contract expired. Signed for Hartford on Jan 23, 2019.	Oct 14, 2018	
MF	(United States) Raul Gonzalez	(United States) Memphis 901	Contract expired. Signed for Memphis on Oct 24, 2018.	Oct 14, 2018	
MF	(United States) Neil Hlavaty		Contract expired. Retired.	Oct 14, 2018	
MF	(Japan) Yudai Imura		Contract expired.	Oct 14, 2018	
MF	(United States) Evan Lee	(United States) Greenville Triumph	Contract expired. Signed for Greenville on Jan 15, 2019.	Oct 14, 2018	
MF	(United States) Koby Osei-Wusu	(United States) Orlando City B	Contract expired. Signed for Orlando on Feb 20, 2019.	Oct 14, 2018	
GK	(United States) Ronnie Pascale		Contract expired. Retired.	Oct 14, 2018	
DF	(Canada) Mallan Roberts	(United States) Tulsa Roughnecks	Contract expired. Signed for Tulsa on Jan 4, 2019.	Oct 14, 2018	
DF	(United States) Shaun Russell	(United States) Forward Madison	Contract expired. Signed for Madison on Mar 25, 2019.	Oct 14, 2018	
MF	(Ghana) Fred Sekyere		Contract expired.	Oct 14, 2018	
FW	(United States) Brian Shriver		Contract expired. Retired.	Oct 14, 2018	
GK	(United States) Trevor Spangenberg	(United States) Birmingham Legion	Contract expired. Signed for Birmingham on Feb 21, 2019.	Oct 14, 2018	
GK	(United States) Zachery Tashjy		Contract expired. Retired.	Oct 14, 2018	
MF	(Ghana) Oscar Umar	(United States) Saint Louis FC	Contract expired. Signed for Saint Louis on Dec 5, 2018.	Oct 14, 2018	
DF	(Trinidad and Tobago) Mekeil Williams	(United States) OKC Energy	Contract expired. Signed for OKC on Jan 8, 2019.	Oct 14, 2018	
DF	(United States) Austin Yearwood	(United States) New Mexico United	Contract expired. Signed for New Mexico on Nov 6, 2018.	Oct 14, 2018	

== Awards ==
=== USL1 All-League Teams ===
Player	Team
(United States) Joe Gallardo	First Team
(Ghana) Wahab Ackwei	Second Team

=== USL1 Team of the Week ===
Week	Players	Opponent(s)	Link
2	(Ghana) Wahab Ackwei	South Georgia Tormenta	
4	(Ghana) Wahab Ackwei (United States) Joe Gallardo (United States) Josh Hughes	Greenville Triumph	
5	(Ghana) Wahab Ackwei (Zambia) Mutaya Mwape	Chattanooga Red Wolves	
6	(Jamaica) Dennis Chin (United States) Daniel Jackson (United States) Conor Shanosky	Lansing Ignite	
7	(Zambia) Mutaya Mwape (United States) Maxi Rodriguez	FC Tucson	
11	(Ghana) Wahab Ackwei (Japan) Akira Fitzgerald	FC Tucson	
13	(United States) Eli Lockaby	South Georgia Tormenta	
17	(Jamaica) Dennis Chin	Orlando City B	
18	(United States) Josh Hughes	Toronto FC II	
20	(United States) Josh Hughes (Brazil) Ivan Magalhães	Forward Madison	
21	(United States) Daniel Jackson	Toronto FC II	
23	(United States) Matt Bolduc (Jamaica) Dennis Chin (United States) Joe Gallardo	South Georgia Tormenta	
24	(Japan) Akira Fitzgerald (Brazil) Ivan Magalhães (United States) Braeden Troyer	Greenville Triumph	
25	(Ghana) Wahab Ackwei	North Texas SC; Forward Madison	
26	(Japan) Akira Fitzgerald	FC Tucson	
28	(Zambia) Mutaya Mwape (United States) Conor Shanosky	Toronto FC II; Orlando City B	

=== USL1 Player of the Week ===
Week	Players	Opponent(s)	Link
23	(United States) Joe Gallardo	South Georgia Tormenta	

=== USL1 Goal of the Week ===
Week	Player	Opponent	Link
4	(United States) Joe Gallardo	Greenville Triumph	
21	(United States) Daniel Jackson	Toronto FC II	

=== USL1 Save of the Week ===
Week	Player	Opponent	Link
24	(Japan) Akira Fitzgerald	Greenville Triumph	
28	(United States) Joe Rice	Toronto FC II	

== Kits ==
Home	Away

Type	Shirt	Shorts	Socks	First appearance / Record
Home	Red	Red	Red	Match 1 vs. Lansing / 3–2–3
Away	White	White	White	Match 3 vs. Lansing / 1–1–5

== See also ==
- Richmond Kickers
- 2019 in American soccer
- 2019 USL League One season
