= 2020 Richmond Kickers season =

Richmond Kickers
2020 season
- Owner: 22 Holdings, LLC
- Head coach: Darren Sawatzky
- Stadium: City Stadium
- USL League One: 4th
- USL1 Championship: Did not qualify
- U.S. Open Cup: Cancelled
- Bon Secours Cup: Winners
- Top goalscorer: League: Terzaghi (10); All: Terzaghi (10)
- Highest home attendance: 875 vs. GVL (Aug. 29) and vs. NE (Oct. 3) and vs. TRM (Oct. 17)
- Lowest home attendance: 634 vs. TUC (August 15)
- Average home league attendance: 771
- Biggest win: ORL 1–3 RIC (Oct. 21)
- Biggest defeat: RIC 0–4 NE (Oct. 3)
Home colors	Away colors

The 2020 Richmond Kickers season was the club's 28th season of existence, their 16th season in the third tier of American soccer, and their second season in the newly created USL League One. It is the Kickers' second season playing in the third tier of American soccer since 2016, when they were in the United Soccer League. Initially, the preseason began on February 8, 2020, and was scheduled to conclude on March 24, 2020. The regular season was originally scheduled to begin on March 28, 2020, and conclude on September 24, 2020.

On March 13, 2020, it was announced that the regular season would be delayed for at least two weeks due to the COVID-19 pandemic. The regular season was slated to begin on March 28, 2020, but was delayed to April 11, 2020, before being indefinitely postponed. The season began with a truncated 16-match season (instead of 28) beginning on July 25, 2020, and concluded on October 24, 2020 (a month later than originally planned).

The 2020 season saw the club return to a winning record for the first time since 2016. Additionally, the club's 4th-place finish was the Kickers' best regular season performance since 2014. Despite the record, the club on the final day of the season failed to reach the USL Championship Game after losing at home to Chattanooga. Striker, Emiliano Terzaghi, scored 10 goals during the season, which was the best performance by a striker for the Kickers since Yudai Imura in 2016. Terzaghi had a 0.63 goals per game average, which was the best performance by a striker for Richmond since Robert Ssejjemba in 2006.

== Roster ==
As of January 2, 2020.

No.	Name	Nationality	Position(s)	Date of birth (age)	Signed in	Previous club	Apps	Goals
Goalkeepers
1	Akira Fitzgerald	(Japan)	GK	July 17, 1987 (age 38)	2019	(United States) Tampa Bay Rowdies	0	0
Defenders
3	Scott Thomsen	(United States)	DF	December 31, 1993 (age 32)	2018	(United States) Orlando City B	0	0
4	Ivan Magalhães	(Brazil)	DF	December 23, 1993 (age 32)	2019	(United States) Tampa Bay Rowdies	0	0
5	Conor Shanosky	(United States)	DF	December 13, 1991 (age 34)	2016	(United States) Louisville City	0	0
18	Wahab Ackwei	(Ghana)	DF	October 19, 1996 (age 29)	2019	(United States) New York Red Bulls II	0	0
20	Luke Pavone	(United States)	DF	March 29, 1995 (age 30)	2019	(Israel) Hapoel Petah Tikva	0	0
Midfielders
8	Amass Amankona	(Ghana)	MF	August 2, 1995 (age 30)	2019	(United States) Indy Eleven	0	0
11	Matt Bolduc	(United States)	MF	October 12, 1994 (age 31)	2017	(United States) Harrisburg City Islanders	0	0
28	Greg Boehme	(United States)	MF	July 7, 1995 (age 30)	2018	(United States) VCU Rams	0	0
77	Charles Boateng	(Ghana)	MF	July 28, 1997 (age 28)	2019	(Ghana) WAFA SC (loan)	0	0
80	Mutaya Mwape	(Zambia)	MF	June 19, 1996 (age 29)	2019	(United States) Charlotte Independence	0	0
98	Ryley Kraft	(United States)	MF	January 13, 1998 (age 28)	2020	(United States) OKC Energy	0	0
Forwards

== Non-competitive ==
Win Draw Loss Postponed

=== Preseason exhibitions ===
February 8	North Carolina FC	Not reported	Richmond Kickers	Cary, North Carolina
TBD EST				Stadium: WakeMed Soccer Park; Attendance: 0
Note: Result not reported, closed door scrimmage.

February 15	Loudoun United	Not reported	Richmond Kickers	Leesburg, Virginia
12:00 PM EST				Stadium: Segra Field; Attendance: 0
Note: Result not reported, closed door scrimmage.

February 22	Richmond Kickers	0–1	New York Red Bulls II	Richmond, Virginia
12:00 PM EST		Report	Corfe 22'	Stadium: Sports Backers Stadium

February 26	Richmond Kickers	3–1	High Point Panthers	Glen Allen, Virginia
7:00 PM EST	Alves 10', 21'; Bolanos 18'	Report	Abril 44'	Stadium: Glover Park

March 1	Richmond Kickers	3–0	Old Dominion Monarchs	Chesterfield, Virginia
4:00 PM EST	Terzaghi 18'; Bolduc 56'; Alves 70'			Stadium: Ukrop Park; Attendance: 200

March 7	Richmond Kickers	3–0	Virginia United	Chesterfield, Virginia
7:30 PM EST	Terzaghi 59'; Kraft 67'; Alves 88'			Stadium: Ukrop Park; Attendance: 350

March 14	Red	Cancelled	White	Richmond, Virginia
12:00 PM EST				Stadium: City Stadium
Note: Cancelled due to the COVID-19 pandemic.

March 21	Richmond Kickers	Cancelled	VCU Rams	Richmond, Virginia
TBD EDT				Stadium: City Stadium
Note: Cancelled due to the COVID-19 pandemic

=== Midseason exhibitions ===
May 20	Lionsbridge FC	Cancelled	Richmond Kickers	Newport News, Virginia
PM EST				Stadium: TowneBank Stadium
Note: Cancelled due to the cancellation of the 2020 USL League Two season due to the COVID-19 pandemic

== Competitive ==
=== USL League One ===
==== Standings ====
Pos	Team	Pld	W	L	D	GF	GA	GD	Pts	PPG	Qualification
2	Union Omaha	16	8	3	5	20	15	+5	29	1.81	Final
3	North Texas SC (Note: Professional teams that are owned by teams playing in a higher division are ineligible for the U.S. Open Cup.)	16	7	3	6	27	19	+8	27	1.69	
4	Richmond Kickers	16	8	6	2	22	22	0	26	1.63	
5	Chattanooga Red Wolves SC	15	6	5	4	21	17	+4	22	1.47	
6	FC Tucson	16	6	6	4	21	19	+2	22	1.38	

Source: 2020 USL League One standings
Rules for classification: 1) points; 2) total wins; 3) total goal differential; 4) total goals scored; 5) points earned against top four Conference finishers; 6) disciplinary points; 7) coin toss or drawing of lots

==== Results by matchday ====
Matchday	1	2	3	4	5	6	7	8	9	10	11	12	13	14	15	16
Stadium	A	A	H	H	H	A	H	A	A	H	A	H	A	H	A	H
Result	D	L	W	W	W	W	D	L	W	W	L	W	L	L	W	L
Position	5	8	6	4	3	2	2	3	3	2	2	2	2	3	2	4

Updated to match(es) played on October 16, 2020. Source: USL League One
A = Away; H = Home; W = Win; D = Draw; L = Loss; P = Postponed

==== Match results ====
USL League One released their full schedule for the 2020 season on December 20, 2019, creating the following fixture list for the early part of Richmond's 2020 season. As a result of the COVID-19 pandemic, a modified 16-game schedule was released on July 10 with the first three games. The full schedule was released on July 17.

Win Draw Loss Postponed

July 18	Tormenta	–	Richmond Kickers	Statesboro, Georgia
19:00 EDT				Stadium: Eagle Field

July 25 1 / Bon Secours Cup	Greenville Triumph	3–2	Richmond Kickers	Greenville, South Carolina
19:00 EDT	Thomsen 21' (o.g.); Antley 46' (o.g.); Morrell (yellow card) 57'; Pilato (yellow card) 64'; Keegan 69'; Fricke (red card) 76'	Report	Bolduc 35'; Terzahgi 74'; Boateng (yellow card) 90+1'	Stadium: Legacy Early College Field; Attendance: 0 (Note: Played behind closed doors due to the COVID-19 pandemic.); Referee: Kevin Broadley
Note: Rescheduled from July 31 due to the COVID-19 pandemic

July 28 2	Tormenta	0–0	Richmond Kickers	Statesboro, Georgia
20:00 EDT	Mueller (yellow card) 7'; Skelton (yellow card) 66'; Micaletto (yellow card) 77'	Report	Falck (yellow card) 13'; Mwape (yellow card) 90'	Stadium: Eagle Field; Attendance: 400 (Note: Capped capacity due to the COVID-19 pandemic.); Referee: Kyle Johnston
Note: Rescheduled from September 23 to July 18 due to the COVID-19 pandemic, and rescheduled from July 18 to July 28 due to a staff member testing positive for Coronavirus disease 2019.

August 1	Richmond Kickers	–	Fort Lauderdale CF	Richmond, Virginia
18:30 EDT				Stadium: City Stadium
Note: Rescheduled to September 23 after a staff member in the Fort Lauderdale CF organization tested positive for coronavirus disease 2019.

August 8 3	Richmond Kickers	1–0	Forward Madison	Richmond, Virginia
18:30 EDT	Terzahgi 9'	Report	Trimmingham (yellow card) 16'; Wojcik (yellow card) 73'	Stadium: City Stadium; Attendance: 822; Referee: Matthew Franz
Note: Rescheduled from March 28 due to the COVID-19 pandemic.

August 15 4	Richmond Kickers	2–1	FC Tucson	Richmond, Virginia
18:30 EDT	Magalhães 8'; Kraft (yellow card) 24'; Bolduc (yellow card) 35'; Terzaghi 42'	Report	Silva (yellow card) 41'; Logue (yellow card) 63'; Adams 81'; Dennis (yellow card) 90'	Stadium: City Stadium; Attendance: 634; Referee: Danielle Chesky
Note: Rescheduled from July 11 due to the COVID-19 pandemic.

August 21 5	New England Revolution II	1–2	Richmond Kickers	Foxborough, Massachusetts
19:00 EDT	Malango 71'; Mendonca (yellow card) 78'	Report	Terzaghi 53'; Cuomo (yellow card) 69'; Kraft 82'	Stadium: Gillette Stadium; Attendance: 0 Referee: Hao Zhong
Note: Rescheduled from April 3 due to the COVID-19 pandemic.

August 29 6 / Bon Secours Cup	Richmond Kickers	2–1	Greenville Triumph	Richmond, Virginia
18:30 EDT	Terzaghi 15'; Bolduc (yellow card) 36'; Kraft 45+2'; Antley (yellow card) 64' (yellow-red card) 74'	Report	Fricke 29'; Clowes (yellow card) 46'; Walker (yellow card) 80'	Stadium: City Stadium; Attendance: 875; Referee: Matthew Franz
Note: Rescheduled from April 18 due to the COVID-19 pandemic.

September 5 7	FC Tucson	2–2	Richmond Kickers	Tucson, Arizona
22:30 EDT	Alarcón 10' (pen.); Adams 15'	Report	Terzaghi 40' (pen.); Falck 90' (pen.)	Stadium: Kino North Stadium; Attendance: 0 Referee: Alan Martinez
Note: Rescheduled from September 4.

September 12 8	Chattanooga Red Wolves	2–1	Richmond Kickers	Chattanooga, Tennessee
13:00 EDT	R. Pineda (yellow card) 43'; Dieterich 54'; Soto (yellow card) 58'; Okonkwo (yellow card) 75'; Beattie 90+2', (yellow card) 90+2'	Report	Terzaghi 13'; Pavone (yellow card) 58'; Diosa (yellow card) 90+4'	Stadium: David Stanton Field; Attendance: 744; Referee: Izlen Peksenar
Note: Rescheduled from April 25 due to the COVID-19 pandemic.

September 19	Richmond Kickers	–	Orlando City B	Richmond, Virginia
18:30 EDT				Stadium: City Stadium
Note: Rescheduled from June 27 due to the COVID-19 pandemic. Match postponed from September 19 following a positive coronavirus disease 2019 test from a member of the Orlando City B organization.

September 23 9	Richmond Kickers	2–1	Fort Lauderdale CF	Richmond, Virginia
18:30 EDT	Terzaghi (penalty missed) 9', 26', (yellow card) 44', (goal) 54'; Venter (yellow card) 31'; Antley (yellow card) 67'; Pavone (yellow card) 81'; Mwape (yellow card) 90+4'	Report	Lopez-Espin 5'; Azcona (yellow card) 25'; Sosa (yellow card) 30'; Fray (yellow card) 88'	Stadium: City Stadium; Attendance: 692; Referee: Danielle Chesky
Note: Rescheduled from August 1 after a staff member in the Fort Lauderdale CF organization tested positive for COVID-19.

September 26 10	Union Omaha	0–1	Richmond Kickers	Papillion, Nebraska
20:00 EDT	Boyce (yellow card) 58'; Scearce (yellow card) 71'	Report	Magalhães 71'	Stadium: Werner Park; Attendance: 2,600; Referee: Lorenzo Hernandez
Note: Rescheduled from June 12 due to the COVID-19 pandemic.

October 3 11	Richmond Kickers	0–4	New England Revolution II	Richmond, Virginia
18:30 EDT	Ackwei (yellow card) 86'; Kwesele (yellow card) 90'	Report	Venter 24' (o.g.); Firmino 31'; Quinones (yellow card) 45+4'; Rennicks 81' (o.g.); Rivera 83'	Stadium: City Stadium; Attendance: 875; Referee: Gary Gutierrez
Note: Rescheduled from June 12 due to the COVID-19 pandemic.

October 7 12	Richmond Kickers	2–1	Orlando City B	Richmond, Virginia
18:30 EDT	Bolanos 27', 43' (yellow card) 67'	Report	Tablante (yellow card) 35' (yellow-red card) 68'; Ndje (yellow card) 37'; Lamb (yellow card) 45+2'; Rosario (yellow card) 89'; Rivera 90+3'	Stadium: City Stadium; Attendance: 626; Referee: John Matto
Note: Reschedule of postponed September 19th match.

October 10 13	North Texas SC	2–1	Richmond Kickers	Arlington, Texas
20:30 EDT	Bruce 23'; Munjoma 45+3'; Rayo (yellow card) 43'; Alisson (yellow card) 81'	Report	Terzaghi 60'; Magalhães (yellow card) 63'; Ackwei (yellow card) 90+3'	Stadium: Globe Life Park; Attendance: 810; Referee: Gerald Flores
Note: Rescheduled from September 15 due to the COVID-19 pandemic.

October 17 14	Richmond Kickers	0–1	Tormenta	Richmond, Virginia
18:30 EDT		Report	Phelps (yellow card) 45+1'; Micaletto 45+4', (yellow card) 88' (yellow-red card) 90+2'; Coutinho (yellow card) 90+1'; Eckenrode (yellow card) 90+3'	Stadium: City Stadium; Attendance: 875; Referee: Matthew Franz
Note: Rescheduled from May 9 due to the COVID-19 pandemic.

October 21 15	Orlando City B	1–3	Richmond Kickers	Kissimmee, Florida
11:00 EDT	Tanaka 8'; Tablante (yellow card) 20'; Rosario (red card) 24'; Rodas (yellow card) 30'; Rosales (yellow card) 61'	Report	Bolduc (yellow card) 7', (penalty missed) 25'; Magalhães (yellow card) 16'; Mwape 36'; Alves 51'; Anderson 64'	Stadium: Osceola County Stadium; Attendance: 0 Referee: Alyssa Nichols
Note: Rescheduled from May 16 due to the COVID-19 pandemic.

October 24 16	Richmond Kickers	1–2	Chattanooga Red Wolves	Richmond, Virginia
18:30 EDT	Ackwei (yellow card) 25'; Anderson 64'; Boehme (yellow card) 90+1'	Report	Hurst 57'; Hernández (yellow card) 86', (goal) 90+3'; R. Pineda (yellow card) 90+1'	Stadium: City Stadium; Attendance: 875; Referee: Danielle Chesky
Note: Rescheduled from August 15 due to the COVID-19 pandemic.

=== U.S. Open Cup ===
As a USL League One club, Richmond was to enter the competition in the second round. Their fixture was initially scheduled to begin on April 7, but was postponed due to the COVID-19 pandemic. On August 17, 2020, the competition was cancelled.

April 7 Second round	Richmond Kickers (Virginia)	Cancelled	(Maryland) Christos or Virginia United	Richmond, Virginia
18:30 EDT				Stadium: City Stadium
Note: Originally scheduled for April 8, cancelled due to the COVID-19 pandemic.

=== Bon Secours Cup ===
The Bon Secours Cup is a two-legged regular season series between USL League One's two southeastern clubs: the Richmond Kickers and the Greenville Triumph. The team with the best aggregate record wins the series. The aggregate score was 4–4 after two matches, but the Kickers won 2–1 on away goals.

July 25 First leg	Greenville Triumph	3–2	Richmond Kickers	Greenville, South Carolina
19:00 EDT	Thomsen 21' (o.g.); Antley 46' (o.g.); Morrell (yellow card) 57'; Pilato (yellow card) 64'; Keegan 69'; Fricke (red card) 76'	Report	Bolduc 35'; Terzahgi 74'; Boateng (yellow card) 90+1'	Stadium: Legacy Early College Field; Attendance: 0 (closed door); Referee: Kevin Broadley
Note: Rescheduled from July 31 due to the COVID-19 pandemic

August 29 Second leg	Richmond Kickers	2–1 (4–4 (a) agg.)	Greenville Triumph	Richmond, Virginia
18:30 EDT	Terzaghi 15'; Bolduc (yellow card) 36'; Kraft 45+2'; Antley (yellow card) 64' (yellow-red card) 74'	Report	Fricke 29'; Clowes (yellow card) 46'; Walker (yellow card) 80'	Stadium: City Stadium; Attendance: 875 (capped capacity); Referee: Matthew Franz
Note: Rescheduled from April 18 due to the COVID-19 pandemic.

== Statistics ==
=== Appearances and goals ===
Numbers after plus–sign (+) denote appearances as a substitute.

No.	Pos	Nat	Player	Total		USL-1		U.S. Open Cup	
No.	Pos	Nat	Player	Apps	Goals	Apps	Goals	Apps	Goals
1	GK	(Japan) JPN	Akira Fitzgerald	16	0	16+0	0	0	0
2	DF	(United States) USA	Ian Antley	9	0	9+0	0	0	0
3	DF	(United States) USA	Scott Thomsen	16	0	14+2	0	0	0
4	DF	(Brazil) BRA	Ivan Magalhães	15	2	14+1	2	0	0
5	DF	(United States) USA	Conor Shanosky	0	0	0	0	0	0
7	MF	(United States) USA	Matt Bolduc	14	1	14+0	1	0	0
8	MF	(Ghana) GHA	Amass Amankona	1	0	0+1	0	0	0
9	FW	(Brazil) BRA	Stanley Alves	11	1	3+8	1	0	0
10	FW	(Zambia) ZAM	Mutaya Mwape	13	1	8+5	1	0	0
11	MF	(Colombia) COL	David Diosa	6	0	3+3	0	0	0
12	DF	(United States) USA	Kyle Venter	15	0	15+0	0	0	0
14	DF	(United States) USA	Luke Pavone	14	0	11+3	0	0	0
15	FW	(Saint Vincent and the Grenadines) VIN	Oalex Anderson	6	2	2+4	2	0	0
16	MF	(United States) USA	Zev Taublieb	1	0	0+1	0	0	0
17	MF	(United States) USA	Jonathan Bolanos	15	2	6+9	2	0	0
18	DF	(Ghana) GHA	Wahab Ackwei	13	0	7+6	0	0	0
20	GK	(United States) USA	Lee Johnston	0	0	0	0	0	0
21	MF	(United States) USA	Greg Boehme	10	0	2+8	0	0	0
22	DF	(United States) USA	Hassan Pinto	1	0	0+1	0	0	0
23	DF	(Sweden) SWE	Victor Falck	16	1	16+0	1	0	0
32	FW	(Argentina) ARG	Emiliano Terzaghi	15	10	14+1	10	0	0
67	DF	(United States) USA	Devante Dubose	2	0	1+1	0	0	0
77	MF	(Ghana) GHA	Charles Boateng	1	0	0+1	0	0	0
93	MF	(Italy) ITA	Gianluca Cuomo	10	0	4+6	0	0	0
94	GK	(United States) USA	Matt Broomall	1	0	0+1	0	0	0
98	MF	(United States) USA	Ryley Kraft	16	2	14+2	2	0	0

- Last updated: October 24, 2020
- Source: Soccerway

=== Top scorers ===
Rank	Position	Number	Name	USL1	U.S. Open Cup	Total
1	FW	32	(Argentina) Emiliano Terzaghi	10	0	10
2	FW	15	(Saint Vincent and the Grenadines) Oalex Anderson	2	0	2
2	MF	17	(United States) Jonathan Bolanos	2	0	2
2	MF	98	(United States) Ryley Kraft	2	0	2
2	DF	4	(Brazil) Ivan Magalhães	2	0	2
3	MF	7	(United States) Matt Bolduc	1	0	1
3	FW	9	(Brazil) Stanley Alves	1	0	1
3	FW	10	(Zambia) Mutaya Mwape	1	0	1
3	MF	23	(Sweden) Victor Falck	1	0	1

- Last updated: October 24, 2020
- Source: Team Goals

=== Top assists ===
Rank	Position	Number	Name	USL1	U.S. Open Cup	Total
1	MF	98	(United States) Ryley Kraft	4	0	4
2	DF	3	(United States) Ian Antley	3	0	3
2	MF	7	(United States) Matt Bolduc	3	0	3
4	DF	3	(United States) Scott Thomsen	1	0	1
4	FW	10	(Zambia) Mutaya Mwape	1	0	1
4	MF	17	(United States) Jonathan Bolanos	1	0	1
4	DF	18	(Ghana) Wahab Ackwei	1	0	1
4	MF	21	(United States) Greg Boehme	1	0	1
4	MF	31	(Zambia) Mumbi Kwesele	1	0	1

- Last updated: October 24, 2020
- Source: Team Assists

=== Disciplinary record ===
No.	Pos.	Player	USL1			U.S. Open Cup			Total		
No.	Pos.	Player	Booked	(yellow card) (yellow-red card)	Sent off (straight red)	Booked	(yellow card) (yellow-red card)	Sent off (straight red)	Booked	(yellow card) (yellow-red card)	Sent off (straight red)
2	DF	(United States) Ian Antley	1	1	0	0	0	0	1	1	0
3	DF	(United States) Scott Thomsen	1	0	0	0	0	0	1	0	0
4	DF	(Brazil) Ivan Magalhães	2	0	0	0	0	0	2	0	0
7	MF	(United States) Matt Bolduc	3	0	0	0	0	0	3	0	0
10	FW	(Zambia) Mutaya Mwape	2	0	0	0	0	0	2	0	0
11	MF	(Colombia) David Diosa	1	0	0	0	0	0	1	0	0
12	DF	(United States) Kyle Venter	1	0	0	0	0	0	1	0	0
14	MF	(United States) Luke Pavone	2	0	0	0	0	0	2	0	0
17	MF	(United States) Jonathan Bolanos	1	0	0	0	0	0	1	0	0
18	DF	(Ghana) Wahab Ackwei	3	0	0	0	0	0	3	0	0
21	MF	(United States) Greg Boehme	1	0	0	0	0	0	1	0	0
23	DF	(Sweden) Victor Falck	1	0	0	0	0	0	1	0	0
31	MF	(Zambia) Mumbi Kwesele	1	0	0	0	0	0	1	0	0
32	FW	(Zambia) Emiliano Terzaghi	1	0	0	0	0	0	1	0	0
77	MF	(Ghana) Charles Boateng	1	0	0	0	0	0	1	0	0
93	MF	(Italy) Gianluca Cuomo	1	0	0	0	0	0	1	0	0
98	MF	(United States) Ryley Kraft	1	0	0	0	0	0	1	0	0
Total			24	1	0	0	0	0	24	1	0

- Last updated: October 24, 2020
- Source: Team Discipline

== Transfers ==
=== In ===
Pos.	Player	Transferred from	Fee/notes	Date	Source
GK	Lee Johnston (United States)	San Antonio FC (United States)	Free	January 22, 2020	
FW	Emiliano Terzaghi (Argentina)	Huracán Las Heras (Argentina)	Free	January 24, 2020	
MF	Mumbi Kwesele (Zambia)	Real Unión (Spain)	Free	February 26, 2020	
MF	Zev Taublieb (United States)	Åtvidabergs FF (Sweden)	Free	May 11, 2020	
FW	Oalex Anderson (Saint Vincent and the Grenadines)	Tacoma Defiance (United States)	Free	August 31, 2020	

=== Out ===
Pos.	Player	Transferred to	Fee/notes	Date	Source
FW	Joe Gallardo (United States)	Real Monarchs (United States)	Free transfer	December 5, 2019	
MF	Alex Ainscough (United States)	Gottne IF (Sweden)	End of contract	December 31, 2019	
FW	Dennis Chin (Jamaica)	—N/a	End of contract	December 31, 2019	
MF	Justin Grove (United States)	—N/a	End of contract	December 31, 2019	
MF	Josh Hughes (United States)	—N/a	End of contract	December 31, 2019	
DF	Aboubacar Keita (United States)	Columbus Crew (United States)	End of loan	December 31, 2019	
MF	Nick Retzlaff (United States)	—N/a	End of contract	December 31, 2019	
MF	Maxi Rodriguez (United States)	Detroit City (United States)	End of contract	December 31, 2019	
DF	Zach Perez (United States)	—N/a	End of contract	December 31, 2019	
FW	Daniel Jackson (United States)	Tormenta (United States)	Free transfer	January 2, 2020	
DF	Eli Lockaby (United States)	Forward Madison (United States)	Free transfer	February 4, 2020	
FW	Jannik Eckenrode (Sweden)	Michigan Stars (United States)	Free transfer	February 22, 2020	
GK	Joe Rice (United States)	New England Revolution II (United States)	Free transfer	March 3, 2020	

=== Loan in ===
Pos.	Player	Parent club	Length/Notes	Beginning	End	Source
FW	Charles Boateng (Ghana)	WAFA (Ghana)	2-year loan	March 15, 2019	March 15, 2021	

=== Loan out ===
Pos.	Player	Loaned to	Beginning	End	Source
DF	Sam Moore (United States)	North Carolina Tar Heels (United States)	February 15, 2020	December 31, 2020	
FW	Key White (United States)	North Carolina Tar Heels (United States)	February 15, 2020	December 31, 2020	

== Awards ==
=== USL League One Player of the Month ===
Month	Player	Ref
September	(Argentina) Emiliano Terzaghi	

=== USL League One Goal of the Month ===
Month	Player	Ref
July	(Argentina) Emiliano Terzaghi	

=== USL League One Player of the Week ===
Week	Player	Opponent	Ref
11	(Brazil) Ivan Magalhães	Union Omaha	

=== USL League One Goal of the Week ===
Week	Player	Opponent	Ref
2	(Argentina) Emiliano Terzaghi	Greenville Triumph	
5	(Brazil) Ivan Magalhães	FC Tucson	

=== USL League One Team of the Week ===
Week	Player	Position	Opponent	Ref
3	(Japan) Akira Fitzgerald	GK	Forward Madison	
4	(United States) Ian Antley	DF	FC Tucson	
4	(Argentina) Emiliano Terzaghi	FW	FC Tucson	
5	(Brazil) Ivan Magalhães	DF	Forward Madison	
6	(United States) Ian Antley	DF	New England Revolution II	
7	(United States) Ryley Kraft	MF	Greenville Triumph	
7	(Argentina) Emiliano Terzaghi	FW	Greenville Triumph	
8	(United States) Ryley Kraft	MF	FC Tucson	
8	(Argentina) Emiliano Terzaghi	FW	FC Tucson	
11	(Brazil) Ivan Magalhães	DF	Union Omaha	
11	(United States) Ryley Kraft	MF	Union Omaha	
11	(Argentina) Emiliano Terzaghi	FW	Union Omaha	
13	(Argentina) Emiliano Terzaghi	MF	North Texas SC	
13	(United States) Jonathan Bolanos	MF	North Texas SC	
