= 2019 Toronto FC II season =

Toronto FC II
2019 season
- Manager: Michael Rabasca
- USL League One: 7th
- USL1 Playoffs: Did not qualify
- Highest home attendance: 525 (June 12 vs. North Texas SC)
- Lowest home attendance: 51 (Sept. 27 vs. Tormenta FC)
- Average home league attendance: 168
- Biggest win: 3–0 (June 8 vs. Lansing) (July 12 vs. Tormenta FC)
- Biggest defeat: 1–4 (July 31 vs. Forward Madison)

The 2019 Toronto FC II season was the fifth season in the club's history. Having previously competed in the United Soccer League (since rebranded as the USL Championship), this was the club's first season in USL League One, the third tier of professional soccer in the United States.

== Current roster ==
Note: Flags indicate national team as defined under FIFA eligibility rules; some limited exceptions apply. Players may hold more than one non-FIFA nationality. Squad correct as of April 27, 2019.

| No. | Pos. | Nation | Player |
|---|---|---|---|
| 19 | FW | USA | Griffin Dorsey |
| 30 | GK | CAN | Yann-Alexandre Fillion (on loan from FC Zurich) |
| 31 | FW | JPN | Tsubasa Endoh |
| 36 | DF | ARG | Franco Ramos Mingo |
| 37 | MF | GHA | Gideon Waja |
| 39 | MF | CAN | Luca Petrasso |
| 40 | GK | USA | Eric Klenofsky |
| 42 | DF | DEN | Patrick Bunk-Andersen |
| 43 | MF | CHI | Adolfo Ovalle |
| 48 | MF | CAN | Dante Campbell |
| 50 | MF | CAN | Matthew Srbely |
| 51 | MF | USA | Trevor Swartz |
| 52 | DF | CAN | Julian Dunn-Johnson |
| 53 | FW | CAN | Jayden Nelson |
| 57 | DF | CAN | Terique Mohammed |
| 58 | MF | CAN | Jordan Faria |
| 59 | MF | CAN | Noble Okello |
| 77 | FW | CAN | Jordan Perruzza |
| 84 | FW | CAN | Jacob Shaffelburg |
| 88 | DF | PAN | Jesus West (on loan from Costa del Este) |
| — | MF | CAN | Mehdi Essoussi |
| — | FW | CAN | Jahkeele Marshall-Rutty |
| — | MF | CAN | Ralph Priso |

Signed to first team contract with Toronto FC.
Toronto FC Academy player.

== Competitions ==
=== USL League One ===
==== Standings ====
| Pos | Team | Pld | W | D | L | GF | GA | GD | Pts |
|---|---|---|---|---|---|---|---|---|---|
| 5 | Chattanooga Red Wolves SC | 28 | 10 | 10 | 8 | 35 | 37 | −2 | 40 |
| 6 | South Georgia Tormenta FC | 28 | 9 | 10 | 9 | 32 | 34 | −2 | 37 |
| 7 | Toronto FC II | 28 | 9 | 9 | 10 | 43 | 46 | −3 | 36 |
| 8 | FC Tucson | 28 | 8 | 9 | 11 | 35 | 41 | −6 | 33 |
| 9 | Richmond Kickers | 28 | 9 | 5 | 14 | 26 | 35 | −9 | 32 |

Source: 2019 USL League One standings
Rules for classification: 1) total wins; 2) total goal differential; 3) total goals scored; 4) points earned against top four Conference finishers; 5) disciplinary points; 6) coin toss or drawing of lots

==== Results summary ====
| Overall | | | | | | | | Home | | | | | | Away | | | | | |
| Pld | W | D | L | GF | GA | GD | Pts | W | D | L | GF | GA | GD | W | D | L | GF | GA | GD |
|---|---|---|---|---|---|---|---|---|---|---|---|---|---|---|---|---|---|---|---|
| 28 | 9 | 9 | 10 | 42 | 45 | −3 | 36 | 6 | 5 | 3 | 26 | 22 | +4 | 3 | 4 | 7 | 16 | 23 | −7 |

Source: USL

==== Results by round ====
| Round | 1 | 2 | 3 | 4 | 5 | 6 | 7 | 8 | 9 | 10 | 11 | 12 | 13 | 14 | 15 | 16 | 17 | 18 | 19 | 20 | 21 | 22 | 23 | 24 | 25 | 26 | 27 | 28 |
|---|---|---|---|---|---|---|---|---|---|---|---|---|---|---|---|---|---|---|---|---|---|---|---|---|---|---|---|---|
| Stadium | A | A | A | A | A | A | H | H | A | H | H | A | H | A | H | H | H | H | H | A | H | A | H | H | A | H | A | A |
| Result | W | D | W | L | L | L | W | W | D | W | D | L | D | L | W | D | L | L | L | D | D | L | D | W | L | W | W | D |
| Position | 2 | 3 | 2 | 3 | 3 | 5 | 5 | 3 | 3 | 3 | 3 | 3 | 4 | 5 | 4 | 4 | 6 | 8 | 8 | 8 | 9 | 9 | 9 | 8 | 9 | 7 | 6 | 7 |

Source: USL
A = Away; H = Home; W = Win; D = Draw; L = Loss

==== Match Results ====
Win Draw Loss

| April 5 1 | Orlando City B | 0–2 | Toronto FC II | Montverde, Florida |
| 7:30 P.M. EDT | Hagan (yellow card) 34' (yellow-red card) 46'; Hernandez (yellow card) 74' | Report | Petrasso 48'; Ovalle (yellow card) 52'; Perruzza 86' | Stadium: Montverde Academy; Attendance: 244; Referee: Amin Hadzic |

| April 13 2 | FC Tucson | 1–1 | Toronto FC II | Tucson, Arizona |
| 9:30pm | Cox 73' | Report | Dorsey (yellow card) 36'; Swartz (yellow card) 57'; Hamilton 79' | Stadium: Kino North Stadium; Attendance: 1,606; Referee: Reyna Fonseca |

| April 26 3 | Lansing Ignite FC | 0–2 | Toronto FC II | Lansing, Michigan |
| 7:00 PM EDT | Stoneman (yellow card) 45+1'; Moshobane (yellow card) 80' | Report | Petrasso 11'; Mohammed (yellow card) 24'; Campbell (yellow card) 39'; Okello (yellow card) 53'; Ovalle 85' (pen.) | Stadium: Cooley Law School Stadium; Attendance: 1,895; Referee: Nickrod Fateh |

| May 4 4 | Forward Madison FC | 3–1 | Toronto FC II | Madison, Wisconsin |
| 8:00 PM | Paulo Jr. 33'; Manley 68'; Banks (yellow card) 89'; Smart 90+6' | Report | Shaffelburg 43' | Stadium: Breese Stevens Field; Attendance: 3,806; Referee: Calin Radosav |

| May 12 5 | South Georgia Tormenta FC | 3–2 | Toronto FC II | Statesboro, Georgia |
| 7:00 PM EDT | Dennis 28', (yellow card) 48', (goal) 90+3'; Phelps (yellow card) 45'; Wells (yellow card) 57'; Antley (yellow card) 76'; Micaletto 72' (pen.) | Report | Perruzza 14'; Bunk-Andersen 36'; Campbell (yellow card) 40'; Mohammed (red card) 73'; Swartz (yellow card) 79'; Ovalle (yellow card) 90+5' | Stadium: Eagle Field; Referee: Ekaterina Koroleva |

| May 17 6 | Orlando City B | 2–0 | Toronto FC II | Montverde, Florida |
| 7:30 P.M. EDT | Sérginho (yellow card) 11'; Tablante 42', (yellow card) 73'; Thiago (yellow card) 62', (goal) 75' (pen.) | Report | Okello (yellow card) 16'; Perruzza (yellow card) 38'; Mingo (red card) 44'; Campbell (yellow card) 83' | Stadium: Montverde Academy; Attendance: 172; Referee: Luis Guardia |

| May 24 7 | Toronto FC II | 1–0 | FC Tucson | Toronto, Ontario |
| 3:00 PM EDT | Mohammed (yellow card) 17'; Dorsey (yellow card) 31'; Perruzza 37'; Okello (yellow card) 86'; Campbell (yellow card) 88' | Report | | Stadium: BMO Training Ground; Attendance: 309; Referee: Scott Bowman |

| May 29 8 | Toronto FC II | 3–2 | North Texas SC | Toronto, Ontario |
| 3:00 PM EDT | Bunk-Andersen 12', (yellow card) 45+3'; Srbely 26'; Okello (yellow card) 32'; Mohammed 77'; Silva (yellow card) 90+6' | Report | A. Rodriguez (yellow card) 35'; Pepi 45+2'; Damus 56'; Jatta (yellow card) 87' | Stadium: BMO Training Ground; Attendance: 177; Referee: Alexis Vaughan |

| June 1 9 | Chattanooga Red Wolves | 2–2 | Toronto FC II | Chattanooga, Tennessee |
| 7:00 PM EDT | Doyle 38', (yellow card) 90+4'; Falvey (yellow card) 71', (goal) 83'; Walls (yellow card) 90+3' | Report | Mingo (yellow card) 26'; Hundal 69'; Shaffelburg 73' | Stadium: David Stanton Field; Attendance: 2,597; Referee: Gabriele Giusti |

| June 8 10 | Toronto FC II | 3–0 | Lansing Ignite FC | Toronto, Ontario |
| 3:00 PM EDT | Hundal 29'; Ovalle (yellow card) 48'; Dorsey (yellow card) 66'; Bunk-Andersen 80'; Perruzza 90+1' | Report | | Stadium: BMO Training Ground; Attendance: 113; Referee: Myriam Marcotte |

| June 12 11 | Toronto FC II | 3–3 | North Texas SC | Toronto, Ontario |
| 11:00 AM EDT | Mohammed (yellow card) 10'; Dorsey 44'; West (yellow card) 72'; Srbely 73', (yellow card) 81'; Mingo 90+2' | Report | Damus 9', 26', 27'; Sealy (yellow card) 10' | Stadium: BMO Training Ground; Attendance: 525; Referee: Silviu Petrescu |

| June 19 12 | Lansing Ignite FC | 1–0 | Toronto FC II | Lansing, Michigan |
| 7:00 PM EDT | Saint-Duc (yellow card) 28', (goal) 61'; Bruce (yellow card) 87' | Report | Mingo (yellow card) 27'; Srbely (yellow card) 89' | Stadium: Cooley Law School Stadium; Attendance: 2,287; Referee: Becky Pagan |

| June 28 13 | Toronto FC II | 1–1 | Forward Madison FC | Toronto, Ontario |
| 4:00 PM EDT | Perruzza 45'; Mingo (yellow card) 77'; Mohammed (yellow card) 83' | Report | Díaz (yellow card) 59'; Tenorio 81' | Stadium: BMO Training Ground; Attendance: 102; Referee: Carly Shaw-MacLaren |

| July 3 14 | FC Tucson | 3–1 | Toronto FC II | Tucson, Arizona |
| 10:00pm | Wheeler-Omiunu 5'; Vega 19'; Jones 26' | Report | Srbely (yellow card) 41'; Mingo (yellow card) 65'; Bjornethun 77' (o.g.) | Stadium: Kino North Stadium; Attendance: 1,772; Referee: Karen Callado |

| July 12 15 | Toronto FC II | 3–0 | Tormenta FC | Toronto, Ontario |
| 4:00 PM EDT | Srbely 28'; Perruzza 38'; Mohammed (yellow card) 43'; Ovalle (yellow card) 63'; Romeo (yellow card) 74'; Bunk-Andersen 78' | Report | | Stadium: BMO Training Ground; Attendance: 113; Referee: Brad Doubrough |

| July 19 16 | Toronto FC II | 3–3 | Lansing Ignite FC | Toronto, Ontario |
| 4:00 PM EDT | Perruzza 35'; Dorsey (yellow card) 38'; Bunk-Andersen 78'; Romeo 81', (yellow card) 84' | Report | Faz 41' (pen.); Fricke 51'; Gomez 54' | Stadium: BMO Training Ground; Attendance: 103; Referee: Giancarlo Pavone |

| July 26 17 | Toronto FC II | 1–2 | Richmond Kickers | Toronto, Ontario |
| 4:00 PM EDT | Ovalle (yellow card) 17'; Srbely 19'; Mohammad (yellow card) 39'; Petrasso (yellow card) 90+1' | Report | Klenofsky 35' (o.g.); Hughes 48'; Bolduc (yellow card) 88' | Stadium: BMO Training Ground; Attendance: 252; Referee: Nicolas Joubert |

| July 31 18 | Toronto FC II | 1–4 | Forward Madison FC | Toronto, Ontario |
| 3:00 p.m. | Perruzza 68'; Dorsey (yellow card) 73' (yellow-red card) 81'; Fraser (yellow card) 87' | Report | Paulo Jr. 42', 61'; Romeo 65' (o.g.); Bement 86' | Stadium: BMO Training Ground; Attendance: 64; Referee: Myriam Marcotte |

| August 9 19 | Toronto FC II | 1–3 | Greenville Triumph SC | Toronto, Ontario |
| 4:00 PM EDT | T. Mohammed (yellow card) 60'; Akinola 64'; Ovalle (yellow card) 70'; Fillion (yellow card) 90+1' | Report | Boland 7'; Polak (yellow card) 23'; Keegan 31'; O. Moahmed 34'; Clowes (yellow card) 75' | Stadium: BMO Training Ground; Attendance: 153; Referee: Carly Shaw-MacLaren |

| August 17 20 | Richmond Kickers | 2–2 | Toronto FC II | Richmond, Virginia |
| 7:00 PM EDT | Jackson 5', 23'; Ackwei (yellow card) 55'; Bolduc (yellow card) 81' | Report | Priso-Mbongue (yellow card) 38'; Perruzza 53'; Srbely (yellow card) 59'; Mohammed 87'; Ovalle (yellow card) 90+2' | Stadium: City Stadium; Attendance: 4,041; Referee: John Griggs |

| August 23 21 | Toronto FC II | 0–0 | Greenville Triumph SC | Toronto, Ontario |
| 3:00 PM EDT | Akinola (yellow card) 59' | Report | Seiler (yellow card) 36'; Hemmings (yellow card) 83' | Stadium: BMO Training Ground; Attendance: 202; Referee: Ben Hoskins |

| September 1 22 | North Texas SC | 2–0 | Toronto FC II | Frisco, Texas |
| 7:00 PM CDT | A. Rodriguez 73' (pen.); Damus 83' | Report | Faria (yellow card) 36'; Klenofsky (yellow card) 40'; Endoh (yellow card) 75'; Mohammed (yellow card) 79'; Campbell (yellow card) 85' | Stadium: Toyota Stadium; Attendance: 879; Referee: Karen Callado |

| September 6 23 | Toronto FC II | 2–2 | Chattanooga Red Wolves | Toronto, Ontario |
| 4:00 PM EDT | Mingo (yellow card) 28'; Perruzza 31' (pen.); Faria 72'; West (yellow card) 74'; Bunk-Andersen (yellow card) 90+1' | Report | Walls (yellow card) 33'; Folla (yellow card) 42'; Beattie 51' (pen.); Mehl (yellow card) 71'; Zayed 83' | Stadium: BMO Training Ground; Attendance: 74; Referee: Seyed-Mohammad Mohseni |

| September 13 24 | Toronto FC II | 3–2 | Orlando City B | Toronto, Ontario |
| 4:00 P.M. EDT | Perruzza 39' (pen.), 56'; Faria (yellow card) 51'; Hummell 85' (o.g.) | Report | Ontivero 23'; Chade (yellow card) 38'; Thiago 71' (pen.), (yellow card) 72' | Stadium: BMO Training Ground; Attendance: 120; Referee: Brad Doubrough |

| September 20 25 | Greenville Triumph SC | 3–1 | Toronto FC II | Greenville, South Carolina |
| 7:00 PM EDT | Clowes 18'; Saul 46'; Lee (yellow card) 48'; Gómez 84' | Report | Waja (yellow card) 12'; Mingo 48' | Stadium: Legacy Early College Field; Attendance: 2,575; Referee: Alyssa Nichols |

| September 27 26 | Toronto FC II | 1–0 | Tormenta FC | Toronto, Ontario |
| 4:00 PM EDT | Mingo 23'; Perruzza (yellow card) 62'; Nelson (yellow card) 89' | Report | Gómez (yellow card) 24'; Micaletto (yellow card) 65' | Stadium: BMO Training Ground; Attendance: 51; Referee: Marko Kalic |

| October 2 27 | Richmond Kickers | 1–2 | Toronto FC II | Richmond, Virginia |
| 7:00 PM EDT | Mwape 9'; Boateng (yellow card) 45+2'; Shanosky (yellow card) 49' | Report | Perruzza 13', 52'; Okello (yellow card) 28'; Bunk-Andersen (yellow card) 45+2'; Mingo (yellow card) 55' (yellow-red card) 90+3'; Akinola (yellow card) 59'; Carlini (yellow card) 78' | Stadium: City Stadium; Attendance: 2,752; Referee: Natalie Simon |

| October 5 28 | Chattanooga Red Wolves | 1–1 | Toronto FC II | Chattanooga, Tennessee |
| 7:00 PM EDT | Seoane 8', (yellow card) 88'; Hurst (yellow card) 57' | Report | Perruzza 86'; Akinola (yellow card) 90+3' | Stadium: David Stanton Field; Attendance: 512; Referee: John Griggs |
