= 2019 Greenville Triumph SC season =

Greenville Triumph SC
2019 season
- Head coach: John Harkes
- Stadium: Legacy Early College Field
- USL League One: 3rd
- USL League One Playoffs: Runner-Up
- U.S. Open Cup: Second Round
- Highest home attendance: League/All: 4,014 (April 6 vs. Lansing Ignite) (Sept. 27 vs. Orlando City B)
- Lowest home attendance: League/All: 1,570 (May 4 vs. North Texas SC)
- Average home league attendance: 2,509
- Biggest win: 4–0 (July 26 at North Texas SC) (Sept. 13 vs. FC Tucson)
- Biggest defeat: 1–3 (July 20 vs. FC Tucson)

The 2019 season was Greenville Triumph SC's first of existence. They played in USL League One.

== Background ==
The formation of a third tier USL League was announced in April 2017, and league officials began touring the country looking for candidate cities for new soccer clubs. USL vice president Steven Short visited Greenville in July 2017, and told local reporters at the time that Greenville was one of the league's top candidates. In early 2018, USL began announcing teams that would play in their inaugural season. The formation of the Greenville Triumph SC was officially announced on March 13, 2018, with local entrepreneur Joe Erwin named as the principal owner. The Greenville team was the third team to join the league after Tormenta FC and FC Tucson, two clubs which already existed and played in USL League Two.

== Club ==
=== Roster ===
As of January 10, 2019.

No.	Position	Nation	Player
1	GK	COL	Miguel Uribe
2	DF	SCO	Dominic Boland
3	DF	USA	Tyler Polak
4	DF	USA	Kevin Politz
5	MF	ENG	Max Hemmings
6	MF	ENG	Paul Clowes
7	MF	USA	Christopher Bermudez
8	MF	USA	Aaron Walker
9	FW	USA	Jake Keegan
10	MF	ESP	Carlos Gómez
11	MF	ENG	Cameron Saul
12	DF	USA	Evan Lee
13	DF	USA	Ryeong Choi
14	DF	USA	Cole Seiler
18	MF	SOM	Omar Mohamed
19	GK	USA	Armando Quezada
21	MF	USA	Sami Guediri
22	GK	GUM	Dallas Jaye
31	FW	USA	Edmundo Robinson
88	FW	USA	Travis Ward

=== Team management ===
As of September 7, 2018

Executive
Majority owner and chairman	Joe Erwin
President	Chris Lewis
Vice chairman	Doug Erwin
Coaching staff
Head coach	John Harkes
Assistant coach	Alex Blackburn
Assistant coach	Rick Wright

== Non-competitive ==
=== Winter friendlies ===
February 21, 2019	New England Revolution	4–1	Greenville Triumph	Bradenton, Florida
16:00 EST		Report		Stadium: IMG Academy

== Competitive ==
=== USL League One ===
==== Standings ====
Pos	Team	Pld	W	D	L	GF	GA	GD	Pts	Qualification
1	North Texas SC	28	17	5	6	53	31	+22	56	Playoffs
2	Lansing Ignite FC	28	12	10	6	49	37	+12	46	Playoffs
3	Greenville Triumph SC	28	12	7	9	32	22	+10	43	Playoffs
4	Forward Madison FC	28	12	7	9	33	26	+7	43	Playoffs
5	Chattanooga Red Wolves SC	28	10	10	8	35	37	−2	40	

Source: 2019 USL League One standings
Rules for classification: 1) total wins; 2) total goal differential; 3) total goals scored; 4) points earned against top four Conference finishers; 5) disciplinary points; 6) coin toss or drawing of lots

==== Results by round ====
Round	1	2	3	4	5	6	7	8	9	10	11	12	13	14	15	16	17	18	19	20	21	22	23	24	25	26	27	28
Stadium	A	H	H	H	A	H	A	H	A	H	H	A	A	A	H	H	A	H	A	H	A	A	A	H	H	A	H	A
Result	L	W	W	L	D	L	D	W	L	D	D	L	W	D	W	L	W	W	W	D	D	W	L	W	W	W	L	L
Position	8	7	5	6	6	7	8	5	6	6	6	8	6	8	5	7	7	3	3	4	3	2	3	3	3	3	3	3

Source: USL
A = Away; H = Home; W = Win; D = Draw; L = Loss

==== Match reports ====
March 29 1	South Georgia Tormenta FC	1–0	Greenville Triumph SC	Statesboro, Georgia
7:00 PM EDT	Morrell 72'	Report		Stadium: Eagle Field at Erk Russell Park; Attendance: 3,519; Referee: Amin Hadzic

April 6 2	Greenville Triumph SC	2–1	Lansing Ignite FC	Greenville, South Carolina
7:00 PM EDT	Robinson (yellow card) 7'; Seiler (yellow card) 35' (yellow-red card) 77'; Politz 85'; Clowes (yellow card) 89'	Report	Perez (yellow card) 14' (yellow-red card) 58'; Lopez-Espin 27'; Stoneman (yellow card) 40'; Coiffic (yellow card) 32', (goal) 49'; Moshobane (yellow card) 59' (yellow-red card) 62'	Stadium: Legacy Early College Field; Attendance: 4,014; Referee: Jasmine Peralta

April 13 3	Greenville Triumph SC	1–0	Chattanooga Red Wolves	Greenville, South Carolina
7:00 PM EDT	Walker (yellow card) 61'; Keegan 74'; Bermudez (yellow card) 90'; Saul (yellow card) 90+4'	Report	Dixon (yellow card) 31'; Folla (yellow card) 36'; Beattie (yellow card) 47'	Stadium: Legacy Early College Field; Attendance: 2,016; Referee: John Matto

April 20 4	Greenville Triumph SC	0–1	Richmond Kickers	Greenville, South Carolina
7:00 PM EDT	Seiler (yellow card) 14'; Clowes (yellow card) 81'	Report	Gallardo 49'; Mwape (yellow card) 58'; Bolduc (yellow card) 78'; Hughes (yellow card) 90+2'	Stadium: Legacy Early College Field; Attendance: 2,168; Referee: David Erbacher

April 27 5	Forward Madison FC	0–0	Greenville Triumph SC	Madison, Wisconsin
7:30 PM	Toyama (yellow card) 48'; Michaud (yellow card) 85'; Tobin (yellow card) 90+2'	Report	Bermudez (yellow card) 42'; Polak (yellow card) 63'; Boland (yellow card) 65'	Stadium: Breese Stevens Field; Attendance: 4,462; Referee: Joshua Encarnación

May 4 6	Greenville Triumph SC	0–1	North Texas SC	Greenville, South Carolina
7:00 PM EDT	Moahmed (yellow card) 67'	Report	Roberts 17'; Avilez (yellow card) 64'; Jatta (yellow card) 83'	Stadium: Legacy Early College Field; Attendance: 1,570; Referee: John Griggs

May 11 7	Lansing Ignite FC	1–1	Greenville Triumph SC	Lansing, Michigan
7:00 PM EDT	Lopez-Espin 76'	Report	Boland (yellow card) 36'; Polak (yellow card) 58'; Ward 68'	Stadium: Cooley Law School Stadium; Attendance: 1,725; Referee: Adam Kilpatrick

May 18 8	Greenville Triumph SC	1–0	Richmond Kickers	Greenville, South Carolina
7:00 PM EDT	Hemmings (yellow card) 13'; Keegan 42'	Report	Shanosky (yellow card) 59'; Lockaby (yellow card) 81'; Boateng (yellow card) 90'	Stadium: Legacy Early College Field; Attendance: 2,356; Referee: Tori Penso

May 25 9	Chattanooga Red Wolves	1–0	Greenville Triumph SC	Chattanooga, Tennessee
7:00 PM EDT	Penida (yellow card) 64'; Falvey (yellow card) 90'; Zayed 90+4'; Folla (yellow card) 90+6'	Report	Clowes (yellow card) 81'	Stadium: David Stanton Field; Attendance: 2,256; Referee: Michael Smith

June 1 10	Greenville Triumph SC	0–0	Tormenta FC	Greenville, South Carolina
7:00 PM EDT	Politz (yellow card) 39'; Boland (yellow card) 53'; Walker (yellow card) 60'	Report	Gómez (yellow card) 73' (yellow-red card) 86'	Stadium: Legacy Early College Field; Attendance: 2,368; Referee: José Lara

June 15 11	Greenville Triumph SC	1–1	Lansing Ignite FC	Greenville, South Carolina
7:00 PM EDT	Seiler 66'	Report	Moon 30'; Saint-Duc (yellow card) 90+3'	Stadium: Legacy Early College Field; Attendance: 2,715; Referee: Matthew Corrigan

June 22 12	Chattanooga Red Wolves	3–2	Greenville Triumph SC	Chattanooga, Tennessee
7:00 PM EDT	Beattie 19', 38', 77'; Caparelli (yellow card) 59'	Report	Keegan 52', 62'; Boland (yellow card) 64'; Polak (yellow card) 73'; Bermudez (yellow card) 88'	Stadium: David Stanton Field; Attendance: 2,137; Referee: John Griggs

June 28 13	Orlando City B	0–2	Greenville Triumph SC	Orlando, Florida
7:30 P.M. EDT	Sérginho (yellow card) 31'; Diouf (yellow card) 72'	Report	Polak (yellow card) 18'; Saul 41'; Mohamed (yellow card) 67'; Gómez 83'	Stadium: Montverde Academy; Referee: Joshua Encarnación

July 6 14	North Texas SC	0–0	Greenville Triumph SC	Frisco, Texas
8:00 PM EDT	Romero (yellow card) 28'; Escribano (yellow card) 59'	Report	Walker (yellow card) 39'; Gómez (yellow card) 86'	Stadium: Toyota Stadium; Attendance: 720; Referee: Chris Ruska

July 13 15	Greenville Triumph SC	1–0	Orlando City B	Greenville, South Carolina
7:00 PM EDT	Mohamed (yellow card) 79'; Walker 88'; Bermudez (yellow card) 90'	Report	Herrera (yellow card) 83'	Stadium: Legacy Early College Field; Attendance: 2,725; Referee: Gustavo Solorio

July 20 16	Greenville Triumph SC	1–3	FC Tucson	Greenville, South Carolina
7:00 PM EDT	Gómez 15'	Report	Jambga 20', 58'; Venter 52'; Hauswirth (yellow card) 68'; Batista (yellow card) 68'	Stadium: Legacy Early College Field; Attendance: 2,395; Referee: Michael Smith

July 26 17	North Texas SC	0–4	Greenville Triumph SC	Frisco, Texas
8:00 PM EDT	Cerrillo (red card) 20'; Roberts (yellow card) 82'; A. Rodríguez (yellow card) 90+4'	Report	Politz (yellow card) 35'; Gómez (yellow card) 45+3'; Walker 62'; Keegan 64', 70'; Robinson (yellow card) 67', (goal) 88' (pen.)	Stadium: Toyota Stadium; Attendance: 958; Referee: Joseph Salinas

August 3 18	Greenville Triumph SC	1–0	Tormenta FC	Greenville, South Carolina
6:00 PM EDT	Keegan 29'; Walker (yellow card) 78'; Hemmings (yellow card) 81'; Guediri (yellow card) 84'	Report	Dennis (yellow card) 58'; Arslan (yellow card) 87'	Stadium: Legacy Early College Field; Attendance: 2,074; Referee: Wilmer Soriano

August 9 19	Toronto FC II	1–3	Greenville Triumph SC	Toronto, Ontario
4:00 PM EDT	T. Mohammed (yellow card) 60'; Akinola 64'; Ovalle (yellow card) 70'; Fillion (yellow card) 90+1'	Report	Boland 7'; Polak (yellow card) 23'; Keegan 31'; O. Moahmed 34'; Clowes (yellow card) 75'	Stadium: BMO Training Ground; Attendance: 153; Referee: Carly Shaw-MacLaren

August 17 20	Greenville Triumph SC	0–0	Forward Madison FC	Greenville, South Carolina
7:00 PM EDT	Clowes (yellow card) 18'	Report	White (yellow card) 17'; Smart (yellow card) 55'	Stadium: Legacy Early College Field; Attendance: 2,457; Referee: Alyssa Nichols

August 23 21	Toronto FC II	0–0	Greenville Triumph SC	Toronto, Ontario
3:00 PM EDT	Akinola (yellow card) 59'	Report	Seiler (yellow card) 36'; Hemmings (yellow card) 83'	Stadium: BMO Training Ground; Referee: Ben Hoskins

August 28 22	Forward Madison FC	0–1	Greenville Triumph SC	Madison, Wisconsin
8:00 PM EDT	Manley (yellow card) 22'	Report	Bermudez 42'; Clowes (yellow card) 59'; Keegan (yellow card) 84'	Stadium: Breese Stevens Field; Attendance: 4,663; Referee: Luis Arroyo

September 7 23	Richmond Kickers	1–0	Greenville Triumph SC	Richmond, Virginia
7:00 PM EDT	Troyer 45+1', (yellow card) 53'	Report	Polak (yellow card) 27'; Walker (yellow card) 45+5'; Robinson (yellow card) 72'	Stadium: City Stadium; Attendance: 3,624; Referee: Nickrod Fateh

September 13 24	Greenville Triumph SC	4–0	FC Tucson	Greenville, South Carolina
8:45 PM EDT	Gómez 13', 21', 87'; Walker 26' (pen.); Donnelly (yellow card) 84'	Report	Hanlin (yellow card) 25'; Terrón (yellow card) 82'	Stadium: Legacy Early College Field; Attendance: 1,684; Referee: Joshua Encarnación

September 20 25	Greenville Triumph SC	3–1	Toronto FC II	Greenville, South Carolina
7:00 PM EDT	Clowes 18'; Saul 46'; Lee (yellow card) 48'; Gómez 84'	Report	Waja (yellow card) 12'; Mingo 48'	Stadium: Legacy Early College Field; Attendance: 2,575; Referee: Alyssa Nichols

September 24 26	FC Tucson	2–3	Greenville Triumph SC	Tucson, Arizona
10:00 PM EDT	Spencer (yellow card) 40'; Jones 50' (pen.); Cox 89'	Report	Saul 3', 44'; Walker (yellow card) 57'; Bermudez 90+4', (yellow card) 90+5'	Stadium: Kino North Stadium; Attendance: 550; Referee: Alejandro Aguilera

September 27 27	Greenville Triumph SC	0–1	Orlando City B	Greenville, South Carolina
7:00 PM EDT	Clowes (yellow card) 37'; Saul (yellow card) 75'	Report	Hummel (yellow card) 45+3'; Bagrou 53', (yellow card) 79'; John (yellow card) 55'; Mbuyu (yellow card) 68'; Sérginho (red card) 90+3'	Stadium: Legacy Early College Field; Attendance: 4,014; Referee: Kevin Broadley

October 5 28	Tormenta FC	3–1	Greenville Triumph SC	Statesboro, Georgia
7:00 PM EDT	Arslan 26', 40'; Micaletto (yellow card) 33'; Rowe (yellow card) 75'; Antley 80'	Report	Gómez 18'; Walker (yellow card) 32'; Bermudez (yellow card) 69'; Ward (yellow card) 88'	Stadium: Eagle Field at Erk Russell Park; Attendance: 1,908; Referee: Chris Ruska

==== USL League One Playoffs ====
October 12 Semifinals	Lansing Ignite FC	0–1	Greenville Triumph SC	Lansing, Michigan
7:00pm (EDT)	Coiffic (yellow card) 70'; Cerda (yellow card) 74'; Cleveland (yellow card) 87'	Report	Clowes (yellow card) 37'; Mohamed (yellow card) 45+2'; Polak (yellow card) 46'; Bermudez 59'; Gómez (yellow card) 79'	Stadium: Cooley Law School Stadium; Attendance: 2,340; Referee: Matthew Thompson

October 19 Final	North Texas SC	1–0	Greenville Triumph SC	Frisco, Texas
7:00pm (EDT)	Jatta (yellow card) 7'; Rodríguez 60'; Damus (yellow card) 90+4'	Report		Stadium: Toyota Stadium; Attendance: 3,245; Referee: Jon Freemon

=== U.S. Open Cup ===
May 8, 2019 First round	Greenville Triumph SC (South Carolina)	1–0	(Georgia (U.S. state)) Tormenta FC	Greenville, South Carolina
19:00 EDT	Boland (yellow card) 50'; Seiler 75'		Rowe (yellow card) 38'; Phelps (yellow card) 40'; Micaletto (yellow card) 85'	Stadium: Legacy Early College Field; Attendance: 1,757; Referee: Wilmer Soriano

May 15, 2019 Second round	Greenville Triumph SC (South Carolina)	1–2	(South Carolina) Charleston Battery	Greenville, South Carolina
7:00 PM EDT	Clowes (yellow card) 19'; Hemmings 29'	Report	van Schaik (yellow card) 4'; Svantesson 79', 90+1'	Stadium: Legacy Early College; Attendance: 1,738; Referee: David Erbacher

== Transfers ==
=== In ===
Pos.	Player	Transferred from	Fee/notes	Date	Source

== Statistics ==
=== Appearances and goals ===
No.	Pos	Nat	Player	Total		USL1		U.S. Open Cup	
No.	Pos	Nat	Player	Apps	Goals	Apps	Goals	Apps	Goals

=== Disciplinary record ===
No.	Pos.	Name	USL1		U.S. Open Cup		Total	
No.	Pos.	Name	Yellow card	Red card	Yellow card	Red card	Yellow card	Red card
