= Ovalle (surname) =

Ovalle is a surname. Notable people with the surname include:

- Adolfo Ovalle (born 1970), Chilean former footballer
- Adolfo Ovalle (born 1997), Chilean footballer
- Alessandro Ovalle (born 2005), Dominican footballer
- Clemente Ovalle (born 1982), Mexican footballer
- Federico Ovalle (born 1955), Mexican politician
- Iñigo Manglano-Ovalle (born 1961), American artist
- Jaime Ovalle (1894–1955), Brazilian composer and poet
- José Tomás Ovalle (1787–1831), Chilean politician
- Juan Ríos Ovalle (1863–1928), Puerto Rican musician and composer
- Lizbeth Ovalle (born 1999), Mexican footballer
- Luis Ovalle (born 1988), Panamanian footballer
- Manuel Enrique Ovalle Araiza (born 1968), Mexican politician
- Ramón Ovalle, Guatemalan Anglican bishop
- Nicolas Ovalle (born 2000), Chilean footballer
