= Adolfo Ovalle =

Adolfo Ovaller may refer:

- Adolfo Ovalle (footballer, born 1970)
- Adolfo Ovalle (footballer, born 1997)
