= Eckenrode =

Eckenrode is a surname. Notable people with the surname include:

- Jannik Eckenrode (born 1993), American professional soccer player
- Lars Eckenrode (born 1995), American professional soccer player
