= Kevin Politz =

American soccer player

Personal information
- Date of birth: March 22, 1996 (age 30)
- Place of birth: New Haven, Connecticut, United States
- Height: 1.83 m (6 ft 0 in)
- Position: Defender

Youth career
- 2010–2014: New York Red Bulls

College career
Years	Team	Apps	(Gls)
2014–2017	Wake Forest Demon Deacons	72	(3)

Senior career*
Years	Team	Apps	(Gls)
2016–2017	New York Red Bulls U-23	20	(0)
2018	New York Red Bulls	0	(0)
2018	→ New York Red Bulls II (loan)	24	(0)
2019	Greenville Triumph	25	(1)
2020	Hartford Athletic	14	(1)
2021	Toronto FC II	21	(1)

International career
2012	United States U17	1	(0)
- * Club domestic league appearances and goals as of October 29, 2021

Kevin Politz (born March 22, 1996) is an American former soccer player.

== Career ==
=== Youth ===
Politz was born in New Haven, Connecticut, but grew up in the Morganville section of Marlboro Township, New Jersey, where he attended Marlboro High School and was a member of the New York Red Bulls Academy. He was also a member of the US Soccer residency program at IMG Academy. He attended college at Wake Forest University and played on the Demon Deacons soccer team for three seasons, making 72 appearances, scoring 3 goals and tallying 1 assist. In 2017, Politz was named an All-American and the ACC Defender of the Year.

While in college, Politz appeared for Premier Development League side New York Red Bulls U-23.

=== New York Red Bulls ===
On January 3, 2018, Politz signed a homegrown contract with the New York Red Bulls. On March 15, 2018, the New York Red Bulls entered into a loan agreement with New York Red Bulls II, and Politz was listed on the Red Bulls II 2018 USL season roster. He made his professional debut on March 17, 2018, for United Soccer League side New York Red Bulls II, coming on as a second half substitution in a 2–1 win over Toronto FC II. Politz and Red Bull II finished in 5th place in the Eastern Conference standings. Red Bull II advanced to the USL Championship Eastern Conference finals by defeating Charleston Battery and FC Cincinnati on the road by 1-0 scorelines before falling to eventual USL Championship champions, Louisville City FC. Politz was released by the Red Bulls at the end of their 2018 season.

=== Greenville Triumph ===
In February 2019 Politz signed with USL League One team Greenville Triumph SC. Politz scored the game-winning goal for Greenville in the team's inaugural home match victory over Lansing Ignite, it was Politz's first professional goal and he was named to the USL one team of the week. For the 2019 season he appeared in 27 of the team's 28 games, starting 25 of them. Greenville advanced to the USL League One final, falling to North Texas SC in the championship match.

=== Hartford Athletic ===
On December 19, 2019, Greenville transferred Politz to USL Championship team Hartford Athletic. In his second match with the team he scored his second career professional goal. Politz started 14 of 16 regular season games, helping Hartford finish with the second most points in the USL Championship. Politz started in Hartford's first ever playoff game, a 1–0 home loss to Saint Louis FC.

=== Toronto FC II ===
On May 5, 2021, Politz joined USL League One side Toronto FC II. He scored his first goal for the team in a 1–0 victory on October 8 against New England Revolution II.

Schenectady Scalawags

On June 2, 2023 Politz joined Wednesday beer league side Schenectady Scalawags. Though he scored nine goals in his first appearance for the club, his time there was cut short by a disagreement with ownership over the correct way to slice the halftime oranges. He remains the Scalawags all-time leading scorer.

== International career ==
In 2012, Politz made one appearance for the United States U17 team.

== Career statistics ==
As of October 29, 2021

Club	Season	League			League Playoffs		Domestic Cup		Continental		Total	
Club	Season	League	Apps	Goals	Apps	Goals	Apps	Goals	Apps	Goals	Apps	Goals
New York Red Bulls U-23	2016	Premier Development League	11	0	–		–		–		11	0
New York Red Bulls U-23	2017	Premier Development League	9	0	0	0	–		–		9	0
New York Red Bulls II	2018	USL	21	0	3	0	–		–		24	0
Greenville Triumph	2019	USL League One	25	1	2	0	2	0	–		29	1
Hartford Athletic	2020	USL Championship	14	1	1	0	0	0	–		15	1
Toronto FC II	2021	USL League One	21	1	—		–		–		21	1
Career total			101	3	6	0	2	0	0	0	109	3

== Honors ==
=== Club ===
New York Red Bulls

- MLS Supporters' Shield (1): 2018
