= Matt Broomall =

American soccer player (born 1994)

Personal information
- Date of birth: April 20, 1994 (age 32)
- Place of birth: Somers Point, New Jersey, U.S.
- Height: 1.93 m (6 ft 4 in)
- Position: Goalkeeper

College career
Years	Team	Apps	(Gls)
2012–2015	Rutgers Scarlet Knights	88	(0)

Senior career*
Years	Team	Apps	(Gls)
2017	Södertälje FK	3	(0)
2018	New York Red Bulls U-23	2	(0)
2018	Atlantic City FC	3	(0)
2019–2020	Richmond Kickers	1	(0)
2021–	Ballymacash Rangers F.C.	0	(0)

Managerial career
- 2018: Averett Cougars (assistant coach)
- * Club domestic league appearances and goals as of October 25, 2020

Matthew "Matt" Broomall (born April 20, 1994) is an American former soccer player and coach.

Raised in Somers Point, New Jersey, Broommall attended Mainland Regional High School.

== Coaching career ==
Broomall joined Averett University men's soccer program as an assistant coach in the 2018 season.

== Club career ==
=== Richmond Kickers ===
Broomall joined the club for the 2019 season, but only saw inclusion in the matchday squad four times throughout the campaign, none of which resulted in a first team appearance. In January 2020, Broomall re-signed with the Kickers ahead of the 2020 season. He made his league debut for the club on matchday one, coming on as a halftime substitute for Akira Fitzgerald in a 3–2 away defeat to the Greenville Triumph.

=== Ballymacash Rangers F.C. ===
Broomall completed a move to Mid-Ulster Football League club Ballymacash Rangers F.C. in February 2021.
