= Jesus West =

Panamanian footballer (born 1999)

Personal information
- Full name: Jesus Andrés West Salazar
- Date of birth: June 19, 1999 (age 27)
- Place of birth: Panama City, Panama
- Height: 5 ft 7 in (1.70 m)
- Position: Right-back

Senior career*
| Years | Team | Apps | (Gls) |
| 2019–2020 | Costa del Este | 0 | (0) |
| 2019 | → Toronto FC II (loan) | 10 | (0) |
| 2020–2021 | Plaza Amador | 12 | (0) |
| 2022 | Árabe Unido | 11 | (0) |

International career
| 2018–2019 | Panama U20 | 9 | (1) |
- * Club domestic league appearances and goals as of 17:33, 16 October 2023 (UTC)

Jesus Andrés West Salazar (born 19 June 1999) is a Panamanian footballer currently playing as a right-back.

== Career statistics ==
=== Club ===
As of 18 May 2019.

| Club | Season | League | | | Cup | | Continental | | Other | | Total | |
| Club | Season | Division | Apps | Goals | Apps | Goals | Apps | Goals | Apps | Goals | Apps | Goals |
|---|---|---|---|---|---|---|---|---|---|---|---|---|
| Costa del Este | 2018–19 | Liga Panameña de Fútbol | 0 | 0 | 0 | 0 | – | | 0 | 0 | 0 | 0 |
| Toronto FC II (loan) | 2019 | USL League One | 10 | 0 | 0 | 0 | – | | 0 | 0 | 10 | 0 |
| Career total | | | 10 | 0 | 0 | 0 | 0 | 0 | 0 | 0 | 10 | 0 |
