= Stanley Alves =

American soccer player

Personal information
- Date of birth: June 30, 1996 (age 30)
- Place of birth: Boston, Massachusetts, United States
- Height: 6 ft 1 in (1.85 m)
- Position: Forward

College career
Years	Team	Apps	(Gls)
2015	Dean Bulldogs	16	(19)
2016–2019	UMass Lowell River Hawks	52	(13)

Senior career*
Years	Team	Apps	(Gls)
2016–2017	Seacoast United Phantoms	2	(0)
2018	Boston Bolts	1	(0)
2019	New England Revolution U-23	9	(4)
2020	Richmond Kickers	23	(1)
- * Club domestic league appearances and goals as of November 2, 2021

Stanley Alves (born June 30, 1996) is an American soccer player who plays as a forward.

== Career ==
=== College and amateur ===
Alves played four years of college soccer at the University of Massachusetts Lowell between 2016 and 2019, although missing the 2017 season due to injury. During his time with the River Hawks, Alves made 52 appearances, scoring 13 goals and tallying 4 assists. He was also a two-time America East All-Conference selection and a 2019 All-Region honoree.

Whilst at college, Alves spent time in the USL PDL and NPSL with Seacoast United Phantoms in 2016 and 2017, as well as a single appearance in the now renamed USL League Two in 2019. Alves also played a single game with Boston Bolts in 2018.

In 2019, Alves also played with New England Revolution's under-23's team whilst getting calls up to the first team.

=== Professional ===
On January 10, 2020, Alves signed with the Richmond Kickers of the USL League One. He made his professional debut on August 30, appearing as a 54th-minute substitute during a 2–1 win over Greenville Triumph SC. He scored his first professional goal on October 21, netting in a 3–1 over Orlando City B.

== Personal ==
Alves was born in Boston, Massachusetts, but his family is from Brazil. He also speaks fluent Portuguese.
