= Nicolás Ovalle Raffo =

Chilean footballer (born 2000)

Personal information
- Full name: Nicolás Ignacio Ovalle Raffo
- Date of birth: 12 April 2000 (age 26)
- Place of birth: Providencia, Chile
- Height: 5 ft 8 in (1.73 m)
- Position: Midfielder

Youth career
- La Roca FC
- 2015–2017: Real Salt Lake Arizona
- 2018–2019: Unión Española

Senior career*
Years	Team	Apps	(Gls)
2020–2021	Toronto FC II	3	(0)
2022	Salt City SC	5	(3)
2023	Andratx	6	(0)
2024	Real Monarchs	1	(0)
Total		15	(3)
- * Club domestic league appearances and goals as of 13 September 2024

Nicolás Ignacio Ovalle Raffo (born 12 April 2000) is a Chilean former footballer.

== Early career ==
Ovalle Raffo was born in Chile, but moved to the United States, when he was only 12 days old. He began playing with La Roca Futbol Club in South Weber, Utah when he was seven. Afterwards he joined Real Salt Lake Arizona, a satellite team of the Real Salt Lake Academy. In 2018, he moved to the youth system of Chilean club Unión Española. In December 2019, after being told he wouldn't be extended with Unión Española, he returned home to his family in the United States, and was soon invited to try out with Toronto FC II in the new year, where his brother played.

== Club career ==
On 6 July 2020, he signed a professional contract with Toronto FC II of USL League One. He was unable to appear for the team in 2020, as the club withdrew from the 2020 season due to the COVID-19 pandemic, although the club picked up his option for the 2021 season. He made his debut on 23 July 2021 in a substitute appearance against New England Revolution II.

In 2022, he played with Salt City SC in USL League Two.

In late 2022, he began training with Spanish club CD Atlético Baleares, but was unable to sign due to a quota issue, but was invited to train with the team for the next six months, with the aim of signing with the club in January. In February 2023, he signed with Andratx in the Tercera Federación. He made his debut on 12 February against Constància.

In late July 2024, he signed with the Real Monarchs of MLS Next Pro, after having trained with the club for the prior couple of months. He made his debut on 13 September against the Tacoma Defiance.

== International career ==
Ovalle Raffo is of Chilean and Italian descent and also holds a US Green Card. He has represented Chile at the youth level and was named to the preliminary roster for the Chile U17 national team for the 2017 FIFA U-17 World Cup.

== Coaching career ==
Nicolás and his brother, Adolfo, started coaching at the Real Salt Lake youth ranks.

== Personal life ==
He is the son of former footballer Adolfo "Fito" Ovalle and the younger brother of footballer Adolfo Ovalle.

== Career statistics ==
As of 13 September 2024

Club	Season	League			Playoffs		Domestic Cup		Continental		Total	
Club	Season	Division	Apps	Goals	Apps	Goals	Apps	Goals	Apps	Goals	Apps	Goals
Toronto FC II	2021	USL League One	3	0	—		–		–		3	0
Salt City SC	2022	USL League Two	5	3	—		–		–		5	3
Andratx	2022–23	Tercera Federación	6	0	—		0	0	–		6	0
Real Monarchs	2024	MLS Next Pro	1	0	—		–		–		1	0
Career total			15	3	0	0	0	0	0	0	15	3
