= Mumbi Kwesele =

American soccer player

Personal information
- Date of birth: February 26, 1995 (age 31)
- Place of birth: Seattle, Washington, United States
- Height: 5 ft 11 in (1.80 m)
- Position: Midfielder

Team information
- Current team: Kamphaengphet
- Number: 90

Youth career
- Pacific Northwest SC

College career
Years	Team	Apps	(Gls)
2013–2014	Barry Buccaneers	33	(3)
2016–2017	Humboldt State Lumberjacks	31	(1)

Senior career*
Years	Team	Apps	(Gls)
2018–2019	Real Unión B		
2020–2021	Richmond Kickers	9	(0)
2022	Bay Cities FC	7	(0)
2023	Flower City Union	1	(0)
2024	Kamphaengphet	6	(0)
- * Club domestic league appearances and goals as of November 2, 2021

Mumbi Kwesele (born February 26, 1995) is an American soccer player who plays as a midfielder. He is a free agent after he last played for Kamphaengphet in the Thai League 3.

== Career ==
=== College ===
Kwesele attended Barry University in 2015, where he played for two seasons. He transferred to Humboldt State University where he played during their 2016 and 2017 seasons.

=== Professional ===
On October 14, 2018, Kwesele moved to Spanish side Real Unión B, who play in the third-tier.

On February 26, 2020, he joined USL League One side Richmond Kickers.

== Personal ==
Mumbi's brother is Mutanda Kwesele, who also played professional soccer.
