= Lucas Mendes (American soccer) =

American soccer player

Personal information
- Date of birth: December 29, 1997 (age 28)
- Place of birth: Arlington, Virginia, United States
- Height: 5 ft 5 in (1.65 m)
- Position: Winger

Team information
- Current team: Fredericksburg Fire

Youth career
- 2013–2016: D.C. United

College career
Years	Team	Apps	(Gls)
2016	Virginia Cavaliers	8	(0)

Senior career*
Years	Team	Apps	(Gls)
2017	New York Cosmos B	5	(0)
2018	FC Baltimore	12	(6)
2019	Richmond Kickers	2	(0)
2022–	Fredericksburg Fire (indoor)	8	(16)
2022–	Virginia Dream FC		

International career
2014	United States U18	3	(1)
2016	United States U20	3	(0)
2022–	United States arena		
- * Club domestic league appearances and goals as of December 26, 2022

Lucas Mendes (born December 29, 1997) is an American professional soccer player who currently plays for Fredericksburg Fire FC in the Major Arena Soccer League 3. Mendes is usually employed as a winger, but can be used as a striker or a central midfielder. Mendes is also owner of National Premier Soccer League club Virginia Dream FC.

Mendes won Gatorade Player of the Year award for boys' soccer in 2016. Mendes won the award while playing for Washington-Lee High School in Arlington, Virginia. Outside of playing for the Washington-Lee Generals boys' soccer team, Mendes also played for the D.C. United Academy system.

== Career ==
=== Youth and college ===
During Mendes' first three years of high school, he opted to play for D.C. United's academy as opposed to high school soccer, due to a U.S. Soccer ruling prohibiting players from playing both high school soccer and academy soccer. While playing for D.C. United's academy, Mendes tallied 25 goals and 17 assists in 45 matches with the team, which helped him earn NSCAA Club All-American honors in 2015. During his senior year of high school, Mendes opted to play high school soccer, and played for Washington-Lee High School's boys varsity soccer team. During the Spring 2016 season, he tallied 21 goals and had 12 assists with the Generals, helping them win a state championship over First Colonial High School. Mendes earned 2016 NSCAA High-School All-America honors, and All-USA Boys Soccer First team honors.

Mendes was listed as a four-star recruit by Top Drawer Soccer, and the 24th best recruit in the nation by College Soccer News. Mendes was recruited to play for the Virginia Cavaliers, considered by many to be one of the most elite collegiate soccer teams in the United States. During Mendes' freshman year with the Cavaliers, he appeared in eight matches, making one start. Mendes did not appear in any more matches during the 2016 season after suffering from mononucleosis.

Mendes registered two assists in the inaugural game for Major Arena Soccer League 3 club Fredericksburg Fire FC.

=== International ===
Born in the United States, Mendes was born to a Portuguese-Angolan father. He has been part of the United States under-18 and under-20 setups, being part of U.S. U-18 National Team pool in October 2014 and U-20 National Team pool in January 2016.

Mendes made his debut for the United States national arena soccer team in August 2022 against Mexico.

== Honors ==
=== Individual ===
- Gatorade High School National Player of the Year (boys' soccer): 2016
- Virginia High School State Player of the Year: 2016
- NSCAA High School All-American: 2016
- NSCAA Club Soccer All-American: 2015

=== Washington-Lee Generals ===
- Virginia 6A State Championship: 2016
