= Dominic Boland =

Scottish association football player

Personal information
- Date of birth: 25 September 1997 (age 29)
- Place of birth: Glasgow, Scotland
- Position: Defender

Youth career
- Clyde

College career
Years	Team	Apps	(Gls)
2015–2016	Upper Iowa Peacocks	19	(1)
2017–2018	Limestone College Saints	36	(6)

Senior career*
Years	Team	Apps	(Gls)
2018	Asheville City SC	11	(0)
2019	Greenville Triumph	26	(1)
2021-2022	Darvel		
2022-2023	Kilwinning Rangers		
2023-2024	Johnstone Burgh	7	(0)
- * Club domestic league appearances and goals as of 19 May 2024

Dominic Boland (born 25 September 1997) is a Scottish footballer who plays as a defender.
