= Ryley Kraft =

American soccer player

Personal information
- Full name: Ryley Kraft
- Date of birth: January 13, 1998 (age 28)
- Place of birth: Roseville, California, United States
- Height: 5 ft 9 in (1.75 m)
- Position: Midfielder

Youth career
- 2015–2017: Sacramento Republic

Senior career*
Years	Team	Apps	(Gls)
2017	Orlando City B	7	(0)
2018	Oklahoma City Energy	0	(0)
2019–2020	Richmond Kickers	24	(2)
2022	Des Moines Menace	12	(4)
2022–2023	Chattanooga Red Wolves	38	(2)

International career^{‡}
2017	United States U19		
- * Club domestic league appearances and goals as of October 16, 2023 ‡ National team caps and goals as of July 19, 2016

Ryley Kraft (born January 13, 1998) is an American retired soccer player who played as a midfielder.

== Career ==
He was acquired by Orlando City B on March 8, 2017, after previously spending time with Sacramento Republic's youth team.

In 2018, Kraft was a trialist with the New England Revolution of the Major League Soccer.

Kraft joined OKC Energy FC of the USL in June 2018.

Kraft signed for Richmond Kickers of the USL League One on August 23, 2019.

After a spell playing the USL League Two with Des Moines Menace, Kraft returned to the professional leagues on August 5, 2022, joining USL League One side Chattanooga Red Wolves.

Kraft retired from professional soccer in December 2023.
