= Cameron Saul =

English association football player (born 1995)

Personal information
- Date of birth: 28 June 1995 (age 31)
- Place of birth: London, England
- Position: Forward

Team information
- Current team: Bentleigh Greens
- Number: 11

Youth career
- 2007–2012: Luton Town
- 2012–2014: Wingate & Finchley

College career
Years	Team	Apps	(Gls)
2015	Young Harris Mountain Lions		
2016–2017	Waldorf Warriors	30	(26)
2018	Lenoir–Rhyne Bears	16	(7)

Senior career*
Years	Team	Apps	(Gls)
2017–2018	Asheville City	16	(10)
2019	Greenville Triumph	18	(4)
2020	Finn Harps	1	(0)
2021–2022	Zakynthos	40	(14)
2022–2023	Chalkida		
2023–2024	Episkopi	17	(5)
2024	Eastern Lions	7	(3)
2025-	Bentleigh Greens	5	(4)
- * Club domestic league appearances and goals as of 14:20, 25 March 2024 (UTC)

Cameron Saul (born 28 June 1995) is an English professional footballer who plays as a forward for Bentleigh Greens. Saul has played in England, the United States, Ireland, Greece, and Australia.

== Professional ==
=== Greenville Triumph (2019) ===
During his time with Greenville, Saul played an important role in the attack, making 18 appearances and scoring four goals. His contributions helped the team finish third in the regular season, securing a playoff spot. Saul and Greenville advanced to the USL League One Final, where they faced North Texas. Despite a strong campaign, the team fell short in the championship match.

=== Greece (2021-2024) ===
In March 2021, Saul signed with Zakynthos, a club competing in the Gamma Ethniki, the third tier of Greek football. Zakynthos had ambitions for promotion, and Saul played a role in their successful campaign, as the team finished first in the league, earning promotion to Super League Greece 2.

=== Australia (2024–Present) ===
In June 2024, Saul moved to Australia, seeking a new challenge in a competitive footballing landscape. He initially signed with Eastern Lions, a club in the Victoria Premier League 1, in July 2024.

After a short spell with Eastern Lions, Saul joined Bentleigh Greens in February 2025. Bentleigh Greens is regarded as one of the biggest and most successful clubs in Melbourne, having a strong history in Australian football.
