= Adolfo Ovalle (footballer, born 1970) =

Chilean footballer (born 1970)

Personal information
- Full name: Adolfo Cristián Ovalle Wood
- Date of birth: June 25, 1970 (age 56)
- Place of birth: Santiago, Chile
- Height: 1.83 m (6 ft 0 in)
- Position: Centre back

Youth career
- Universidad Católica

Senior career*
Years	Team	Apps	(Gls)
1990–1992	Universidad Católica		
1992–1993	Santiago Wanderers		
1994	Cobresal		
1995	Universidad Católica		
1995	LDU Quito	44	
1996	Deportes Concepción		
1997	Deportes Temuco		
1998	Santiago Morning		
1999	Provincial Osorno		
2000–2004	Utah Blitzz	74	(16)

International career
1992	Chile U23	3	(0)
- * Club domestic league appearances and goals

Adolfo Cristián "Fito" Ovalle Wood (born June 25, 1970) is a Chilean former footballer.

== Early life ==
Ovalle began playing youth soccer in Chile for his school Colegio San Agustín when he was 11. When he was 14, he began playing in the youth system of Universidad Católica.

== Club career ==
In 1990, at the age of 19, he made his senior debut for Universidad Católica of the Chilean Primera División, coming on as a substitute for the final 30 minutes. In 1991, he was part of the team that won the 1991 Copa Chile.

In 1992, he moved to Santiago Wanderers of the Chilean Segunda División. In 1994, he returned to the Chilean top tier with Cobresal. In January 1995, he returned to Universidad Católica.

While playing for Catolica, Ovalle was noticed by Ecuadorian club LDU Quito of the Ecuadorian Serie A, joining them on a one-year contract in 1995. With LDU Quito that season, he was named Best Foreign Player by the Circulo de Periodistas del Ecuador, Nucleo de Pichincha and named to the All League Team. He played 44 games for LDU Quito.

Afterwards, he returned to the Chilean top tier, playing with Deportes Concepción and Deportes Temuco in 1996 and 1997, respectively followed by stints in the second tier with Santiago Morning and Provincial Osorno in 1998 and 1999, respectively.

In 2000, he went to the United States and had trials with Major League Soccer clubs New England Revolution and Dallas Burn. While he did not sign for either club, Dallas assistant Oscar Pisano recommended him to Chris Agnello, who was the head coach of the Utah Blitzz of the USL D-3 Pro League, who signed him to a two-year contract in April. He ultimately spent five seasons with the Blitzz, serving as team captain winning four Western Conference titles and winning the League Championship playoffs in 2001 and 2004. In 2000, he was named league Defender of the Year and made the league all-star team in 2000 and 2002.

== International career ==
In 1991, Ovalle was called to the Chile U23 team for the 1992 CONMEBOL Pre-Olympic Tournament, playing in each match, although they failed to qualify for the Olympics.

== Post-playing career ==
After his first season with the Blitzz, in 2001, he began coaching in the Utah Blitzz Academy. After he retired in 2005, he formed his own youth club, La Roca FC in Utah. Since 1994, he has been part of the Utah Olympic Development Program. In 2007, he was an assistant coach with the Real Salt Lake U17s.

== Personal ==
Ovalle is the father of professional players Adolfo Ovalle and Nicolas Ovalle Raffo.
