= Ivan Magalhães =

Brazilian footballer (born 1993)

Personal information
- Full name: Ivan Magalhães dos Santos
- Date of birth: 23 December 1993 (age 32)
- Place of birth: São Paulo, Brazil
- Height: 1.86 m (6 ft 1 in)
- Position: Defender

Team information
- Current team: Richmond Kickers
- Number: 4

Youth career
- 2006: São Paulo
- 2007–2009: Grêmio Barueri
- 2010–2012: Corinthians

College career
Years	Team	Apps	(Gls)
2013–2014	Eastern Florida Titans	33	(10)
2015	Maryland Terrapins	22	(1)

Senior career*
Years	Team	Apps	(Gls)
2016–2017	Rio Grande Valley FC	57	(2)
2018	Tampa Bay Rowdies	8	(0)
2019–2021	Richmond Kickers	61	(3)
- * Club domestic league appearances and goals as of 2 November 2021

Ivan Magalhães dos Santos (born 23 December 1993) is a Brazilian professional footballer who plays as a defender.

== Career ==
=== College and amateur ===
Magalhães played two years of college soccer at Eastern Florida State College between 2013 and 2014, before transferring to the University of Maryland in 2015.

=== Professional ===
Magalhães was drafted in the second round of the 2016 MLS SuperDraft (26th overall) by Houston Dynamo. However, he didn't sign with Houston, instead joining their United Soccer League affiliate Rio Grande Valley FC on March 16, 2016. He recorded over 4,800 minutes in 56 matches for Rio Grande Valley FC, scoring two goals in his first two professional seasons.

On 12 January 2018, it was announced that Magalhães had signed with the Tampa Bay Rowdies.

On 19 March 2019, Magalhães signed with the Richmond Kickers ahead of the inaugural USL League One season.
