= Franco Ramos Mingo =

Argentine footballer

Personal information
- Full name: Franco Gastón Ramos Mingo
- Date of birth: 18 September 1997 (age 29)
- Place of birth: Córdoba, Argentina
- Height: 1.88 m (6 ft 2 in)
- Position: Centre-back

Team information
- Current team: PSIM Yogyakarta
- Number: 4

Youth career
- –2019: Boca Juniors

Senior career*
Years	Team	Apps	(Gls)
2019–2020	Toronto FC II	13	(3)
2020–2021	San Fernando	4	(0)
2020–2021	→ Las Rozas (loan)	20	(0)
2021–2022	Marbella	19	(1)
2022–2023	Atlético Levante	28	(2)
2023–2025	Beroe	48	(0)
2025–	PSIM Yogyakarta	31	(4)
- * Club domestic league appearances and goals as of 5 September 2026

Franco Gastón Ramos Mingo (born 18 September 1997) is an Argentine professional footballer who plays as a centre-back for Super League club PSIM Yogyakarta.

He is the brother of current Barcelona B player Santiago Ramos Mingo and Matías Ramos Mingo.

== Career statistics ==
=== Club ===
As of 5 September 2026.

Club	Season	League			Cup		Continental		Other		Total	
Club	Season	Division	Apps	Goals	Apps	Goals	Apps	Goals	Apps	Goals	Apps	Goals
Toronto FC II	2019	USL League One	13	3	0	0	–		0	0	13	3
San Fernando CD	2021–22	Primera División RFEF	4	0	0	0	–		0	0	4	0
Las Rozas CF	2020–21	Segunda División B	20	0	5	1	–		0	0	25	1
Marbella FC	2021–22	Segunda División RFEF	19	1	0	0	–		0	0	19	1
Atlético Levante UD	2022–23	Segunda División RFEF	28	2	0	0	–		0	0	28	2
Beroe	2023–24	First League	31	0	2	0	–		0	0	33	0
Beroe	2024–25	First League	17	0	2	0	–		0	0	18	0
PSIM Yogyakarta	2025–26	Super League	30	4	0	0	–		0	0	30	4
PSIM Yogyakarta	2026–27	Super League	1	0	0	0	–		0	0	1	0
Career total			163	7	9	1	0	0	0	0	172	8
