= Matt Bolduc =

American soccer player (born 1994)

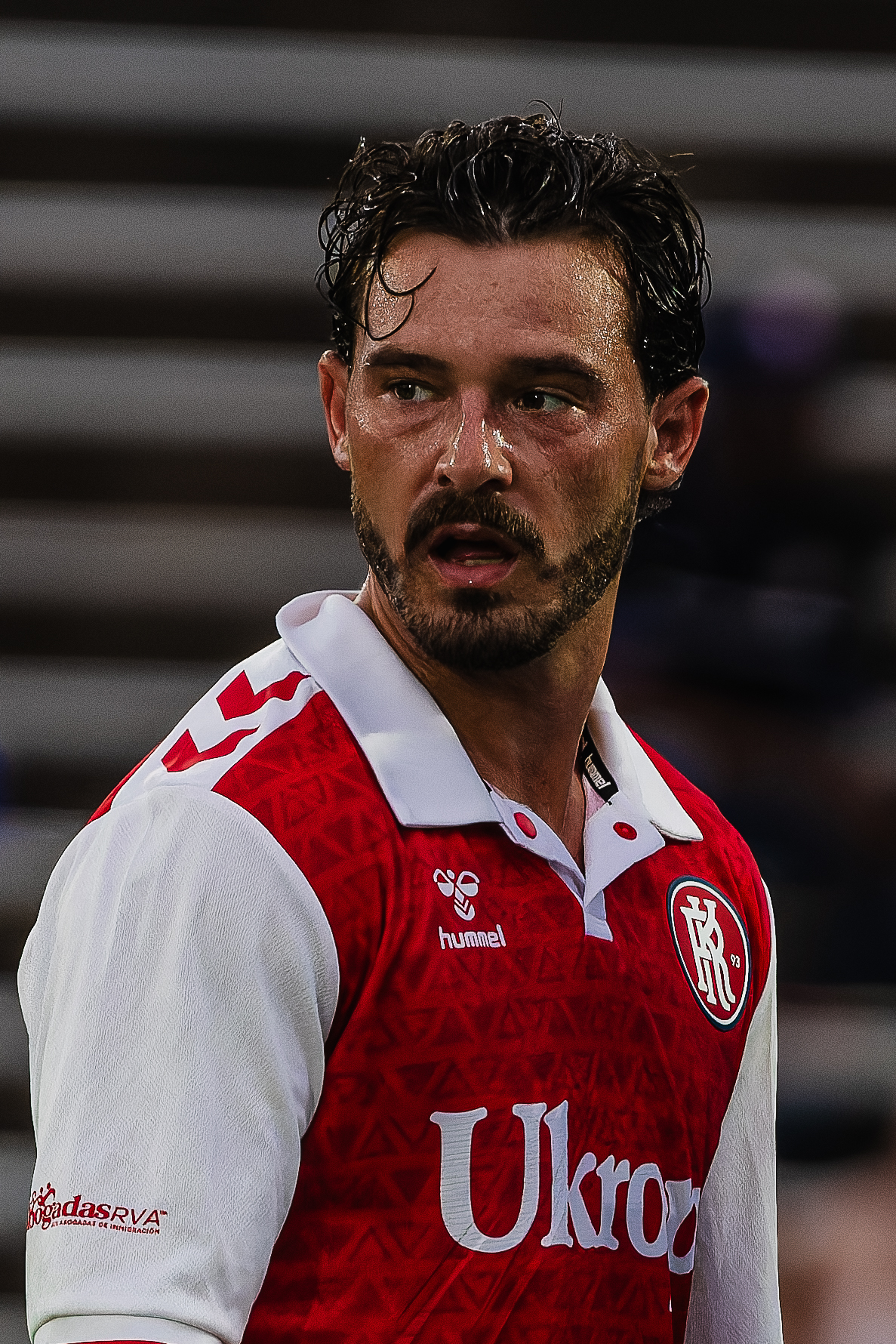
- Bolduc with Richmond Kickers in 2026

Personal information
- Full name: Matthew Gaydis Bolduc
- Date of birth: 12 October 1994 (age 32)
- Place of birth: Peterborough, New Hampshire, United States
- Height: 1.73 m (5 ft 8 in)
- Position: Winger

Team information
- Current team: Richmond Kickers
- Number: 31

Youth career
- 2006–2011: NH Classics
- 2012–2013: FC Blazers

College career
Years	Team	Apps	(Gls)
2013	UMass Minutemen	16	(0)

Senior career*
Years	Team	Apps	(Gls)
2014–2015	Mass United FC		
2016	Harrisburg City Islanders	18	(0)
2017–2022	Richmond Kickers	98	(4)
2023	Flower City Union	24	(4)
2025	Richmond Kickers	14	(1)
2026	Sarasota Paradise	5	(1)
2026–	Richmond Kickers	23	(3)
- * Club domestic league appearances and goals as of November 2, 2026

Matthew Gaydis Bolduc (born 12 October 1994) or known for short as Matt Bolduc is an American professional soccer player who plays as a winger for the Richmond Kickers in USL League One.

== Early life ==
Matthew Gaydis Bolduc was born on 12 October 1994 in Peterborough, New Hampshire to Philip and Suzanne Bolduc. He started bhis youth career playing for the NH Classics in 2006. After the youth club merged in 2011, he went to FC Blazers. Bolduc started high school at The Winchendon School.

== Playing career ==
Bolduc started college with UMass Minutemen in 2013 after graduating from high school. He would make a total of 16 games but scored no goals.

On 1 July 2014, he signed for Mass United FC in the American Soccer League.

On 17 March 2016, Bolduc signed for the Harrisburg City Islanders in the United Soccer League. He would make a total of 18 appearances in the 2016 season.

=== Richmond Kickers ===
==== 2017 ====
On 17 May 2017, Bolduc signed for the Richmond Kickers in United Soccer League. On 15 July, Bolduc made his debut for the Kickers in a 1–0 loss against Harrisburg City Islanders. On 19 August, he scored his first goal for the Kickers 2–1 win against Toronto FC II. He would score his second goal in a 1–0 win against Saint Louis FC. Bolduc made 14 appearances and scored two goals in his debut season.

==== 2018 ====
On 24 March 2018, he made his first appearance of the 2018 season in a 0–1 loss against Indy Eleven. He would make his final appearance for the season in a 0–2 loss against Ottawa Fury FC. Bolduc would make 12 appearances in the 2018 season but scored no goals and the club would finish 11th place and 22nd overall and failed to make the playoffs.

==== 2019 ====
On 14 January 2019, Bolduc signed a new contract extension with the Kickers.

On 30 March 2019, he would make his first appearance of the 2019 season in a 3–2 loss against Lansing Ignite FC. On 20 April, Bolduc would make his first goal contribution of the season assisting a goal for Joe Gallardo in a 1–0 win against Greenville Triumph, this was his first goal contribution his debut season in 2017.

His second assist for the season would come in a 2–0 victory against FC Tucson, where he would assist for Mutaya Mwape. He would record another two goal contributions 3–2 loss against Orlando City B on 22 May. On 17 August 2019, he would make an assist to Dennis Chin in a thrilling 4–1 win against Tormenta FC. In the 2019 season, he made 20 appearances but no goals.

==== 2020 ====
On 25 July 2020, he played and scored his first goal of the season in a 3–2 loss against Greenville Triumph. On 21 August, he assisted a goal to Emiliano Terzaghi in a 1–2 win against New England Revolution II. Over a week later, Bolduc made his second assist in a 2–1 home loss against Chattanooga Red Wolves SC. In the 2020 season, he scored one goal and made 14 appearances.

==== 2021 ====
On 17 April 2021, Bolduc made his first appearance of the season in a 3–0 win against New England Revolution II. He would score his first goal in a 3–2 win against New England Revolution II. On 24 July, he assisted a goal for Emiliano Terzaghi in a 2–2 draw against Tormenta FC. On 14 August, Bolduc contributed a goal in a 2–2 draw against New England Revolution II. On 30 October, he made another goal contribution in a 4–2 loss against FC Tucson. The Kickers would make it to the playoffs, but loss to 1–0 to FC Tucson.

==== 2022 ====
On 2 April 2022, Bolduc made his first appearance of the 2022 season in a 4–0 win against FC Tucson. On 10 June 2022, Bolduc made his final appearance for the 2022 season in a 4–0 win against expansion club, Charlotte Independence On 7 December 2022, Bolduc left the Kickers after six seasons with the club.

=== Flower City Union ===
On 15 April 2023, Bolduc joined Flower City Union in the National Independent Soccer Association. He made his first appearance for the club in a 1–0 loss against Chattanooga FC. On 10 June 2023, he scored his first goal in a 2–0 win against Gold Star FC. Two weeks later, he scored his second goal in a 2–0 win against Savannah Clovers FC. On 5 August, he assisted a goal to Alioune Diakhate in a 2–0 win against Maryland Bobcats FC. A week later, he scored 3–2 win against Gold Star FC. His team would make the playoffs and he scored the only goal in the final against Michigan Stars FC which ended in 1–0 win, securing his ever trophy. He would leave the club following the 2023 season.

=== Return to Richmond Kickers ===
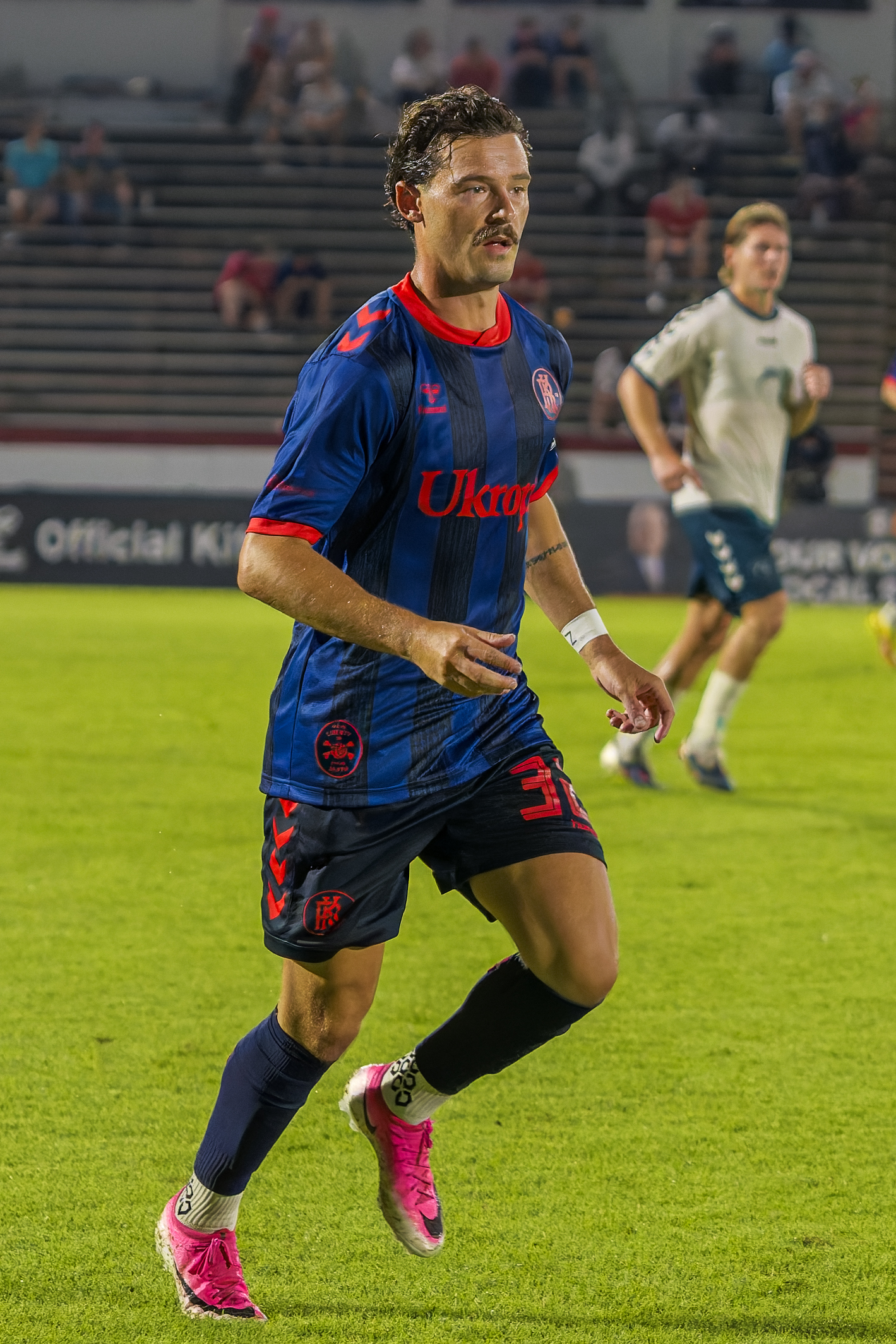
Bolduc playing in a match against former club, Sarasota Paradise in July 2026, his first game back with the Kickers for the third time

On 18 February 2025 after spending the entire 2024 season without a club, Bolduc re-signed for the Richmond Kickers in USL League One. He made his first appearance returning to the club, in a 1–0 loss against Charlotte Independence. On 22 March, he made his 100th total league appearance for the Kickers 3–1 win against expansion club, AV Alta.

On 25 May, he scored his first goal in a 2–2 draw against expansion club, Westchester SC. On 7 June, he made he assisted a goal for Josh Kirkland 1–2 loss against Texoma FC, another expansion club. On 25 October 2025, he made his final appearance for the club in a 5–1 win against Forward Madison where he was subbed in for Emiliano Terzaghi. On 30 November 2025, he was released by the Kickers.

=== Sarasota Paradise ===
On 8 May 2026, Bolduc joined USL League One expansion club, Sarasota Paradise. On 9 May, he made his debut for club in a 4–1 loss against Chattanooga Red Wolves SC. On 3 June 2026, he left the club after the expiry of his 25-Day contract.

=== Return to Richmond Kickers ===
On 2 July 2026, Bolduc signed a 25-Day contract to return to the Richmond Kickers for the third time of his career.
