= Jannik Eckenrode =

American professional soccer player

Personal information
- Full name: Jannik Christian Eckenrode
- Date of birth: December 13, 1993 (age 32)
- Place of birth: Springfield, Virginia, United States
- Height: 5 ft 10 in (1.78 m)
- Positions: Midfielder; forward

Youth career
- D.C. United

College career
Years	Team	Apps	(Gls)
2012	Radford Highlanders	19	(1)
2013–2015	George Mason Patriots	57	(9)

Senior career*
Years	Team	Apps	(Gls)
2015	AC Connecticut	9	(1)
2015	D.C. United U-23	7	(1)
2016	Ægir	20	(2)
2017	Karlslunds IF HFK		
2018	South Georgia Tormenta	3	(0)
2018	Jammerbugt FC	1	(0)
2019	Richmond Kickers	13	(0)
2020	Michigan Stars	1	(0)
- * Club domestic league appearances and goals as of February 21, 2021

Jannik Christian Eckenrode (born December 13, 1993) is an American former professional soccer player.
