= Daniel Jackson (soccer) =

American soccer player (born 1989)

Personal information
- Date of birth: July 10, 1989 (age 37)
- Place of birth: Pittsburgh, Pennsylvania, United States
- Height: 6 ft 1 in (1.85 m)
- Position: Forward

College career
Years	Team	Apps	(Gls)
2007–2009	Cumberland Bulldogs		
2012–2013	Coker Cobras	33	(19)

Senior career*
Years	Team	Apps	(Gls)
2009–2010	Kalamazoo Outrage	19	(2)
2012	FC JAX Destroyers	16	(1)
2013	D.C. United U-23	8	(8)
2014	Carolina RailHawks	17	(0)
2015	Charlotte Independence	15	(4)
2015	→ Carolina RailHawks (loan)	3	(0)
2016–2017	Oklahoma City Energy	13	(0)
2017	Saint Louis FC	10	(2)
2018	Devonport City	8	(4)
2018	BK-46	8	(4)
2019	Richmond Kickers	22	(4)
2019–2020	Orlando SeaWolves (indoor)	7	(2)
2020	South Georgia Tormenta	14	(1)
2021	Chattanooga FC	2	(2)
- * Club domestic league appearances and goals as of August 22, 2021

Daniel Jackson (born July 10, 1989) is an American professional soccer player who plays as a forward.

== Career ==
=== College and amateur ===
Jackson played four years of college soccer, two years spent at Cumberland University before transferring to Coker College in 2012.

While at college, Jackson appeared for Premier Development League clubs Kalamazoo Outrage and FC JAX Destroyers, as well as NPSL club D.C. United U-23.

=== Professional ===
On January 21, 2014, Jackson was selected in the fourth round (70th overall) of the 2014 MLS SuperDraft by Real Salt Lake. However, he wasn't signed by the club.

Jackson signed with NASL club Carolina RailHawks on March 12, 2014.

After a season in the United Soccer League with Charlotte Independence in 2015, Jackson moved to fellow USL club Oklahoma City Energy on February 2, 2016.

On July 11, 2017, Jackson was transferred to Saint Louis FC from the Oklahoma City Energy on a permanent deal, while Saint Louis FC sent José Angulo to OKC in return.

In February 2018, Jackson joined National Premier Leagues Tasmania side Devonport City for a short spell ending in early June.

Jackson returned to the United States by signing with the Richmond Kickers on February 11, 2019.

In January 2020, Jackson signed with South Georgia Tormenta FC of USL League One.

In August 2021, Jackson joined National Independent Soccer Association side Chattanooga FC.
