= Charles Boateng (footballer, born 1997) =

Ghanaian professional footballer

Personal information
- Date of birth: 28 July 1997 (age 29)
- Place of birth: Kumasi, Ghana
- Height: 1.75 m (5 ft 9 in)
- Positions: Attacking midfielder; forward

Team information
- Current team: Richmond Kickers (on loan from WAFA SC)
- Number: 77

Youth career
- 2009–2015: WAFA SC

Senior career*
Years	Team	Apps	(Gls)
2015–2021	WAFA SC		
2019–2021	→ Richmond Kickers (loan)	16	(2)
- * Club domestic league appearances and goals as of 25 October 2020

Charles Boateng (born 28 July 1997) is a Ghanaian professional footballer who plays as a forward.

In January 2017, Boateng agreed to terms with Real Salt Lake to join their USL side Real Monarchs on loan. However, in February it was announced by the club that Boateng had failed his physical and would not be joining the side.

In March 2019, Boateng made his return to the US after signing on loan with the Richmond Kickers.

In the first round of the 2019 U.S. Open Cup, Boateng scored four goals to lead the Kickers to a 6–2 win over Virginia United.

Boateng finished the 2019 season by scoring two goals in the final three league matches against the Chattanooga Red Wolves on September 29, 2019, as well as in a 2–0 win over Orlando City B in the final match of the season.
