= Mutaya Mwape =

Zambian footballer (born 1996)

Personal information
- Date of birth: 19 June 1996 (age 30)
- Place of birth: Lusaka, Zambia
- Height: 1.68 m (5 ft 6 in)
- Position: Midfielder

Team information
- Current team: Chattanooga FC

Youth career
- Manhattan SC PSG 95

College career
Years	Team	Apps	(Gls)
2016–2017	Lindsey Wilson Blue Raiders	34	(25)

Senior career*
Years	Team	Apps	(Gls)
2016	Ocean City Nor'easters	6	(1)
2017	Charlotte Eagles	12	(2)
2018	Charlotte Independence	14	(1)
2019–2020	Richmond Kickers	36	(3)
2022	South Georgia Tormenta 2	11	(1)
2022	South Georgia Tormenta	3	(0)
2023–	Chattanooga FC	0	(0)
- * Club domestic league appearances and goals as of 16 October 2022

Mutaya Mwape (born 19 June 1996) is a Zambian professional footballer who plays as a midfielder for Chattanooga FC in NISA.

== Club career ==
=== College and amateur ===
Mwape played two years of college soccer at Lindsey Wilson College between 2016 and 2017, where he scored 25 goals and tallied 19 assists in 34 appearances for the Blue Raiders.

While at college, Mwape also appeared for Premier Development League sides Ocean City Nor'easters and Charlotte Eagles. While with the Nor'easters in 2016, he helped the team win the Eastern Conference championship, while playing in every game during that playoff run. He scored two goals and dished out two assists before Ocean City fell short in the PDL Semifinals. The following year, Mwape joined the Eagles where he helped the club win the first PDL championship in team history.

=== Professional ===
On 1 March 2018, Mwape signed for United Soccer League side Charlotte Independence. He left Charlotte at the end of their 2018 season.

On 21 January 2019, Mwape joined the Richmond Kickers ahead of the first USL League One season.

Mwape joined South Georgia Tormenta on August 25, 2022. He made three appearances in the season, and had his contract option declined.

On 28 December 2022, Mwape signed with Chattanooga FC of NISA.
