= Adolfo Ovalle (footballer, born 1997) =

Chilean footballer (born 1997)

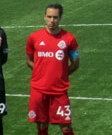
- Ovalle with Toronto FC II in 2019

Personal information
- Full name: Adolfo Andrés Ovalle Raffo
- Date of birth: April 28, 1997 (age 29)
- Place of birth: Temuco, Chile
- Height: 1.75 m (5 ft 9 in)
- Position: Midfielder

Youth career
- La Roca FC
- 2012–2015: Real Salt Lake AZ

Senior career*
| Years | Team | Apps | (Gls) |
| 2015–2016 | Real Salt Lake | 0 | (0) |
| 2015 | → Real Monarchs (loan) | 21 | (0) |
| 2016–2017 | Fidelis Andria | 0 | (0) |
| 2017 | → Sambenedettese (loan) | 0 | (0) |
| 2018 | Rangers de Talca | 4 | (0) |
| 2019–2020 | Toronto FC II | 22 | (1) |
| 2020 | → Forward Madison (loan) | 9 | (1) |
| 2022–2023 | Tacoma Defiance | 39 | (1) |
| Total | | 95 | (3) |

International career
| 2014–2016 | Chile U20 | 4 | (0) |
- * Club domestic league appearances and goals as of 9 October 2023

Adolfo Andrés "Fito" Ovalle Raffo (born April 28, 1997) is a Chilean former footballer who played as midfielder.

== Early life ==
Ovalle grew up in Salt Lake City, Utah where his father, also named Adolfo Ovalle, ended his playing career and continued to reside after his playing career. Ovalle began playing with La Roca Futbol Club in South Weber, Utah, which was founded by his father. Afterwards, he joined Real Salt Lake Arizona, a satellite team of the Real Salt Lake Academy.

== Club career ==
On March 6, 2015, Ovalle signed a homegrown contract with Real Salt Lake. On March 22, he made his professional debut with USL affiliate club Real Monarchs SLC in a 0–0 draw against LA Galaxy II. He was waived on April 28, 2016.

On August 20, 2016, Ovalle signed a one-year deal with the Italian Lega Pro side Fidelis Andria. After being held back by a bad injury, he eventually joined Sambenedettese on loan in 2017 for six months, despite being pursued by Cardiff and Bolton as well.

In 2018, he joined Chilean club Rangers de Talca.

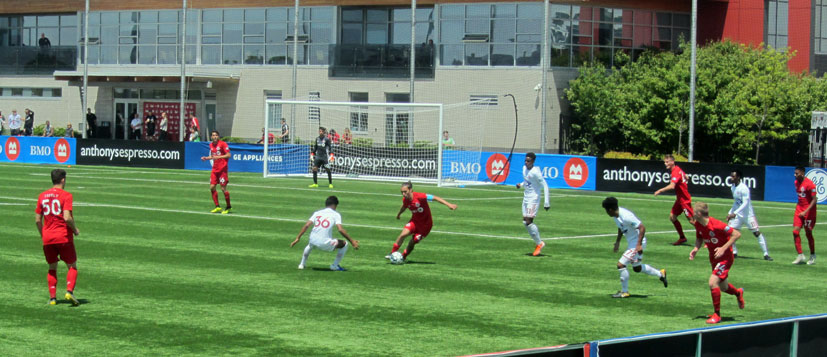
Adolfo Ovalle dribbles out of own end

In 2019, he signed with Toronto FC II of USL League One. In 2020, after TFCII opted out of the 2020 season due to the COVID-19 pandemic, he went on loan to Forward Madison. His contract expired following the 2020 season. During the 2021 season, he trained with the Toronto FC first team for the bulk of the season, but was not officially added to the roster.

In April 2022, he signed with the Tacoma Defiance in MLS Next Pro.

== International career ==
Ovalle has represented Chile in the under-20 level, making a total of four appearances. He represented them at friendly tournaments in 2014 and won the L'Alcúdia Tournament in 2015.

== Coaching career ==
Adolfo and his brother, Nicolás, started coaching at the Real Salt Lake youth ranks.

== Personal life ==
He is the son of former footballer Adolfo Ovalle and the older brother of Nicolás Ovalle Raffo, who also is a professional player.

== Honours ==
Chile U20

- L'Alcúdia International Tournament: 2015
