= 2017 Richmond Kickers season =

Richmond Kickers
2017 season
- Owner: RKYSC
- Head coach: Leigh Cowlishaw
- Stadium: City Stadium
- USL: East: 14th Overall: 26th
- USL Playoffs: Did not qualify
- U.S. Open Cup: Second round
- Top goalscorer: League: Alhaji Kamara (4); All: Alhaji Kamara (4)
- Highest home attendance: 8,021 vs. Harrisburg (Mar 25 – USL)
- Lowest home attendance: 850 vs. Christos (May 17 – USOC)
- Average home league attendance: 4,665
- Biggest win: RIC 3–1 CHS (8/26); ORL 0–2 RIC (9/7)
- Biggest defeat: CLT 3–0 RIC (9/2)
Home colors	Away colors

The 2017 Richmond Kickers season was the club's twenty-fifth season of existence. It was also the Kickers' 10th season playing in the second-tier of American soccer, and their first season in the second division since 2005. The Kickers played in the United Soccer League for their sixth straight season.

For only the third time in the club's history, the Kickers failed to qualify for the playoffs. It was Richmond's first season since 2003 where they failed to qualify. The Kickers scored a club-low 24 goals during the 32-match regular season. The club finished 14th out of 15 teams in the USL's Eastern Conference, and finished 26th in the 30-team league. The Kickers also suffered a second round exit in the U.S. Open Cup, losing to amateur outfit, Christos FC. It was the Kickers' shortest spell in the Open Cup since 2009. Off the field, the Kickers enjoyed their highest ever league attendance, averaging 4,665 fans per match.

== Background ==
The Kickers finished the 2016 season ranked seventh in the Eastern Conference, and earned a berth into the 2016 USL Playoffs. Richmond lost in their first round match-up to Louisville City. Midfielder Yudai Imura lead the Kickers with 10 goals in league play and 11 goals across all competitions.

== Transfers ==
=== Transfers in ===
No.	Pos.	Nat.	Name	Age	Moving from	Type	Transfer window	Ends	Transfer fee	Source
9	MF	(Brazil)	Oliver	24	Puerto Rico FC	Free	Pre-season	2018	Free	
1	GK	(Canada)	Marcel DeBellis	25	Ottawa Fury (Canada)	Free	Pre-season	2018	Free	
8	DF	(United States)	Evan Lee	23	FC Cincinnati	Free	Pre-season	2018	Free	
16	MF	(United States)	Patrick McCann	26	Sligo Rovers (Republic of Ireland)	Free	Pre-season	2018	Free	
22	GK	(United States)	Alex Wimmer	26	Karlslunds IF (Sweden)	Free	Pre-season	2018	Undisclosed	
15	DF	(Canada) (Sierra Leone)	Mallan Roberts	26	Ottawa Fury (Canada)	Free	Pre-season	2018	Undisclosed	
12	MF	(England)	Finnlay Wyatt	22	Longwood University	Free	Pre-season	2018	Free	
21	MF	(United States)	Chris Durkin	17	D.C. United	Loan	Pre-season	2017	Undisclosed	
45	FW	(Sierra Leone)	Alhaji Kamara	23	D.C. United	Loan	Pre-season	2017	Undisclosed	
24	GK	(United States)	Eric Klenofsky	22	D.C. United	Loan	Pre-season	2017	Undisclosed	
3	DF	(United States)	Chris Odoi-Atsem	21	D.C. United	Loan	Pre-season	2017	Undisclosed	
23	MF	(Canada)	Maxim Tissot	25	D.C. United	Loan	Pre-season	2017	Undisclosed	
20	FW	(United States)	Mikey Minutillo	25	07 Vestur (Faroe Islands)	Free	Mid-season	2018	Free	
29	DF	(United States)	Chris Korb	29	D.C. United	Loan	Mid-season	2017	Undisclosed	
70	FW	(Cameroon)	Franck Tayou	27	San Antonio FC	Free	Mid-season	2018	Undisclosed	

=== Transfers out ===
No.	Pos.	Nat.	Name	Age	Moving to	Type	Transfer window	Transfer fee	Source
8	DF	(United States)	Hugh Roberts	24	Bethlehem Steel	Free	Pre-season	Free	
22	MF	(United States)	Brian Ownby	26	Louisville City FC	Free	Pre-season	Free	
26	MF	(Mexico)	Miguel Aguilar	23	D.C. United	End of loan	Pre-season		
27	MF	(United States)	Collin Martin	22	D.C. United	End of loan	Pre-season		
32	MF	(United States)	Scott Thomsen	23	Orlando City B	Free	Pre-season	Free	
36	GK	(United States)	Ronnie Pascale	40		Retired	Pre-season	Retired	

== Non-competitive ==
=== Preseason exhibitions ===
March 2	Richmond Kickers	2–1	William & Mary Tribe	Bensley
19:15 EST	Imura 26'; Eskay 69' (pen.)		Bustamante 43'	Stadium: Ukrop Park
Note: Postponed from March 1 due to adverse weather

March 4 Pro-Am Challenge	Richmond Kickers	1–1	Virginia Cavaliers	Bensley
17:00 EST	Oliver 24'		Nus 45'	Stadium: Ukrop Park

March 8	North Carolina FC	3–0	Richmond Kickers	Cary
11:00 EST	Fondy 11' (pen.); Molano 50'; Orlando 88'			Stadium: WakeMed Soccer Park

March 15	Richmond Kickers	Cancelled	North Carolina FC	Richmond
19:00 EST				Stadium: City Stadium

March 19	Richmond Kickers	1–2	VCU Rams	Richmond
17:00 EST	Grant 49'	Report	Shimazaki 17'; Fatton 60'	Stadium: City Stadium

=== Midseason exhibitions ===
July 19	Richmond Kickers (United States)	1–2	(Wales) Swansea City	Richmond
19:30 EST	Tayou 69'	Report	McBurnie 42' (pen.); Abraham 80'; Carroll (yellow card) 81'	Stadium: City Stadium; Attendance: 8,119; Referee: Christopher Spivey

== Competitive ==
=== USL ===
==== Standings ====
Pos	Team	Pld	W	D	L	GF	GA	GD	Pts
11	Harrisburg City Islanders	32	10	7	15	28	47	−19	37
12	Saint Louis FC	32	9	9	14	35	48	−13	36
13	Pittsburgh Riverhounds	32	8	12	12	33	42	−9	36
14	Richmond Kickers	32	8	8	16	24	36	−12	32
15	Toronto FC II	32	6	7	19	27	54	−27	25

Source: 2017 USL standings
Rules for classification: 1) total wins; 2) total goal differential; 3) total goals scored; 4) points earned against top four Conference finishers; 5) disciplinary points; 6) coin toss or drawing of lots

==== Results ====
March 25 1	Richmond Kickers	1–0	Harrisburg City Islanders	Richmond, Virginia
17:00 EDT	Shanosky 51' (Sekyere); Troyer (yellow card) 66'; Kamara (yellow card) 79'	Report	Wheeler (penalty missed) 14'; Benbow (yellow card) 85'	Stadium: City Stadium; Attendance: 8,021; Referee: Jose Carlos Rivero

April 1 2	New York Red Bulls II	1–0	Richmond Kickers	Montclair, New Jersey
16:00 EDT	Valot (yellow card) 41'; Lewis 69'	Report	Durkin (yellow card) 48'; Lee (yellow card) 77'	Stadium: MSU Soccer Park at Pittser Field; Attendance: 806; Referee: Henrik Karlsson

April 8 3	Richmond Kickers	0–1	Louisville City	Richmond, Virginia
17:00 EDT	E. Lee (yellow card) 25'; A. Lee (yellow card) 44'	Report	Davis IV (yellow card) 10' (goal) 81' (pen.)	Stadium: City Stadium; Attendance: 7,603; Referee: Danielle Chesky

April 15 4	Richmond Kickers	0–1	Ottawa Fury	Richmond, Virginia
17:00 EDT		Report	McEleney (yellow card) 34'; Barden (yellow card) 59'; Campbell (yellow card) 68'; Dos Santos 79'	Stadium: City Stadium; Attendance: 4,974; Referee: Kevin Broadley

April 22 5	Richmond Kickers	2–1	Pittsburgh Riverhounds	Richmond, Virginia
17:00 EDT	Sekyere 15'; Kamara 47'	Report	Hollingsworth 60'	Stadium: City Stadium; Attendance: 1,567; Referee: Mark Gorak

April 29 6	Tampa Bay Rowdies	1–0	Richmond Kickers	St. Petersburg, Florida
19:30 EDT	Lowe (yellow card) 40'; Brown 45'	Report	Sekyere (yellow card) 86'	Stadium: Al Lang Stadium; Attendance: 4,829; Referee: Elvis Osmanovic

May 6 7	Richmond Kickers	1–1	FC Cincinnati	Richmond, Virginia
19:00 EDT	Sekyere 7'	Report	McLaughlin 70'; Delbridge (yellow card) 86'	Stadium: City Stadium; Attendance: 4,008; Referee: Charles Murphy

May 13 8	Richmond Kickers	0–0	Harrisburg City Islanders	Richmond, Virginia
19:00 EDT	Lee (yellow card) 26'; Sekyere (yellow card) 35'	Report	Mensah (yellow card) 88'	Stadium: City Stadium; Attendance: 3,903; Referee: Kevin Broadley

May 21 9	Rochester Rhinos	1–1	Richmond Kickers	Rochester, New York
16:05 EDT	Beresford (yellow card) 16'; Forbes 32'; Farrell (yellow card) 73'; Felix (yellow card) 85'	Report	Gonzalez 45'; Asante (yellow card) 81'	Stadium: Capelli Sport Stadium; Attendance: 2,003; Referee: Henrik Karlsson

May 24 10	Toronto FC II	0–0	Richmond Kickers	Vaughan, Ontario
12:00 EDT	Pereira (yellow card) 27'; Osorio (red card) 60'; Fraser (yellow card) 85'	Report	Shanosky (yellow card) 29'	Stadium: Ontario Soccer Centre; Attendance: 1,074; Referee: Silviu Petrescu

May 27 11	Ottawa Fury	5–3	Richmond Kickers	Ottawa, Ontario
14:00 EDT	Seoane 10', 38'; Rozeboom 70'; Hume 74'; Sanon 90'	Report	Gonzalez (yellow card) 9'; Kamara 34', 49', 58'; Durkin (yellow card) 46'; Jane (yellow card) 84'	Stadium: TD Place Stadium; Attendance: 4,294; Referee: Carol Chenard

June 3 12	Richmond Kickers	0–1	New York Red Bulls II	Richmond, Virginia
19:00 EDT	Durkin (yellow card) 67'	Report	Abidor (yellow card) 32'; Allen 38'	Stadium: City Stadium; Attendance: 6,267; Referee: Calin Radosav

June 10 13	Charleston Battery	1–0	Richmond Kickers	Charleston, South Carolina
19:00 EDT	Portillo 26' (pen.); Woodbine (yellow card) 61'; Mueller (yellow card) 82'	Report	Shanosky (yellow card) 12'	Stadium: MUSC Health Stadium; Attendance: 2,526; Referee: Gustavo Solorio

June 17 14	Richmond Kickers	1–1	Tampa Bay Rowdies	Richmond, Virginia
19:00 EDT	Tayou 90+3' (yellow card) 90+4'	Report	Boden (yellow card) 42'; Savage (yellow card) 44'; Lowe (yellow card) 60'; Schäfer 64'	Stadium: City Stadium; Attendance: 4,034; Referee: J. T. Alukonis

June 24 15	Richmond Kickers	0–2	Charlotte Independence	Richmond, Virginia
19:00 EDT	Luiz Fernando (yellow card) 47'; Durkin (yellow card) 86'	Report	Martínez 45' (pen.), 57'	Stadium: City Stadium; Attendance: 4,423; Referee: Greg Dopka

July 1 16	Bethlehem Steel	1–1	Richmond Kickers	Bethlehem, Pennsylvania
16:00 EDT	Jones 51'; Burke (yellow card) 65' (yellow-red card) 90'; Roberts (red card) 66'; Trusty (yellow card) 90'	Report	Luiz Fernando 40'; Troyer (yellow card) 45'; Jane (yellow card) 54'	Stadium: Goodman Stadium; Attendance: 3,006; Referee: Andrew Musashe

July 9 17	FC Cincinnati	2–0	Richmond Kickers	Cincinnati, Ohio
18:00 EDT	Djiby 3'; Quinn 90' (pen.); Nicholson (yellow card) 72'; Bahner (yellow card) 78'	Report	Sekyere (red card) 87'	Stadium: Nippert Stadium; Attendance: 21,769; Referee: Jon Freemon

July 15 18	Harrisburg City Islanders	1–0	Richmond Kickers	Harrisburg, Pennsylvania
19:00 EDT	Mensah 76'; Mohamed (yellow card) 16'; Wilson (yellow card) 63'; Calvano (yellow card) 71'	Report		Stadium: FNB Field; Attendance: 3,289; Referee: Brandon Smith

July 22 19	Richmond Kickers	3–2	Bethlehem Steel	Richmond, Virginia
19:45 EDT	Oliver 46' (yellow card) 58'; Luiz Fernando 47'; Asante 87'; Wyatt (yellow card) 90'	Report	Jones 39'; Tribbett 69'; Marquez (yellow card) 76'	Stadium: City Stadium; Attendance: 2,921; Referee: Danielle Chesky
Note: Game delayed by 45 minutes due to oppressive heat

July 26 20	Charlotte Independence	0–0	Richmond Kickers	Matthews, North Carolina
19:00 EDT	Martinez (yellow card) 5'; Johnson (yellow card) 90'	Report	Asante (yellow card) 24'; Troyer (yellow card) 44'	Stadium: Sportsplex at Matthews; Attendance: 1,384; Referee: Christina Unkel

July 29 21	Richmond Kickers	0–1	Saint Louis FC	Richmond, Virginia
19:00 EDT	Robinson (yellow card) 17'; Asante (yellow card) 35'; Tayou (yellow card) 73'	Report	Appiah 46'; Stojkov (yellow card) 6'	Stadium: City Stadium; Attendance: 2,622; Referee: Kevin Broadley

August 5 22	Pittsburgh Riverhounds	1–1	Richmond Kickers	Pittsburgh, Pennsylvania
19:00 EDT	Okai 82'; Earls (yellow card) 40'	Report	Gonzalez 65'	Stadium: Highmark Stadium; Attendance: 3,048; Referee: Henrik Karlsson

August 12 23	Richmond Kickers	0–1	Orlando City B	Richmond, Virginia
19:00 EDT	Asante (yellow card) 41'; Tayou (yellow card) 71'; Luiz Fernando (yellow card) 74'; Yomby (yellow card) 81'; Sekyere (yellow card) 86'	Report	Barry 24'; Carroll (yellow card) 28' (yellow-red card) 90'; Rocha (yellow card) 54'	Stadium: City Stadium; Attendance: 3,157; Referee: Lorant Varga

August 19 24	Richmond Kickers	2–1	Toronto FC II	Richmond, Virginia
19:00 EDT	Jane 6'; Bolduc 68'; Imura (yellow card) 27'	Report	Hamilton 4'; Srbely (yellow card) 67'; McCrary (yellow card) 84'; Campbell (yellow card) 90'	Stadium: City Stadium; Attendance: 5,059; Referee: Calin Radosav

August 26 25	Richmond Kickers	3–1	Charleston Battery	Richmond, Virginia
19:00 EDT	Jane 17'; Oliver 36' (yellow card) 32'; Imura 90+2'; Eskay (yellow card) 89'	Report	Cordovés 2'; Thomas (yellow card) 38' van Schaik (yellow card) 53'	Stadium: City Stadium; Attendance: Nickrod Fateh; Referee: 3,527

September 2 26	Charlotte Independence	3–0	Richmond Kickers	Matthews, North Carolina
19:00 EDT	Siaj 3'; Martinez 60' (pen.), 90'	Report	Oscar (yellow card) 15'; Lee (yellow card) 39'; Roberts (yellow card) 70'; Durkin (yellow card) 76'; Worra (yellow card) 90'	Stadium: Sportsplex at Matthews; Attendance: 1,329; Referee: Gustavo Solorio

September 7 27	Orlando City B	0–2	Richmond Kickers	Orlando, Florida
16:30 EDT	Schweitzer (yellow card) 22'	Report	Minutillo 40'; Jane 45'; Bolduc (yellow card) 54'	Stadium: Orlando City Stadium; Attendance: 791; Referee: Jonathan Bilinski
Note: Kickoff moved from 19:30 to 16:30 due to Hurricane Irma.

September 16 28	Charleston Battery	1–0	Richmond Kickers	Charleston, South Carolina
19:00 EDT	Cordovés 84'; Lasso (yellow card) 34'; Williams (red card) 37'; Thomas (yellow card) 77'	Report	Eskay (yellow card) 65'	Stadium: MUSC Health Stadium; Attendance: 2,228; Referee: Kevin Broadley

September 23 29	Richmond Kickers	1–0	Rochester Rhinos	Richmond, Virginia
19:00 EDT	Minutillo 80'	Report	Kamdem (yellow card) 79'	Stadium: City Stadium; Attendance: 5,969; Referee: Jorge Ramirez

October 1 30	Richmond Kickers	0–1	Orlando City B	Richmond, Virginia
17:00 EDT	Jane (yellow card) 24'; Yomby (yellow card) 45'; Luiz Fernando (yellow card) 45'; Umar (red card) 90'	Report	Barry 80'; Rocha (yellow card) 45'	Stadium: City Stadium; Attendance: 6,582; Referee: Jose Lara

October 7 31	Saint Louis FC	0–1	Richmond Kickers	Fenton, Missouri
20:30 EDT (19:30 CDT)	Charpie (yellow card) 60'; Cabalceta (yellow card) 78'	Report	Bolduc 46' (yellow card) 90'	Stadium: World Wide Technology Soccer Park; Attendance: 5,725; Referee: Eric Tattersall

October 14 32	Louisville City	3–1	Richmond Kickers	Louisville, Kentucky
19:30 EDT	Morad 33'; Lancaster 84'; Kaye 86'; Davis IV (yellow card) 38'	Report	Roberts 45+1'; Minutillo (yellow card) 34'; Umar (yellow card) 40'; Luiz Fernando (red card) 68'	Stadium: Louisville Slugger Field; Attendance: 9,104; Referee: Joshua Brooks

=== U.S. Open Cup ===
May 17 Second round	Richmond Kickers (Virginia)	0–1	(Maryland) Christos FC	Richmond, Virginia
19:30 EST	Eskay (yellow card) 29'; Troyer (yellow card) 39'	Report	Caltabiano 79'; Kansaye (yellow card) 21'	Stadium: City Stadium; Attendance: 850; Referee: JC Griggs

== Statistics ==
=== Squad, appearances and goals ===
As of October 19, 2017

Italics indicate player no longer on team roster.

No.	Nat	Positions	Total				USL		USL Cup		U.S. Open Cup	
No.	Nat	Positions	Players	Apps	Goals	Mins	Apps	Goals	Apps	Goals	Apps	Goals
Goalkeepers
1	(Canada)	GK	Marcel DeBellis	3	0	270	2	0	0	0	1	0
22	(United States)	GK	Alex Wimmer	0	0	0	0	0	0	0	0	0
26	(United States)	GK	Eric Klenofsky	1	0	90	1	0	0	0	0	0
30	(United States)	GK	Matt Turner	20	0	1800	20	0	0	0	0	0
48	(United States)	GK	Travis Worra	9	0	810	9	0	0	0	0	0
Defenders
2	(Cameroon)	RB, CB	William Yomby	18	0	1478	17	0	0	0	1	0
3	(United States)	CB	Chris Odoi-Atsem	1	0	90	1	0	0	0	0	0
5	(United States)	LB, CB	Conor Shanosky	19	1	1455	18	1	0	0	1	0
8	(United States)	RB, CB	Evan Lee	15	0	775	14	0	0	0	1	0
15	(Canada)	CB	Mallan Roberts	30	1	2667	30	0	0	0	0	0
18	(Guam)	RB	Alex Lee	25	0	2234	24	0	0	0	1	0
22	(Canada)	LB, CB	Maxim Tissot	4	0	340	4	0	0	0	0	0
29	(United States)	LB, CB	Chris Korb	1	0	71	1	0	0	0	0	0
31	(United States)	LB	Braeden Troyer	29	0	2610	28	0	0	0	1	0
38	(United States)	CB	Jalen Robinson	4	0	339	4	0	0	0	0	0
Midfielders
4	(Ghana)	MF	Fred Sekyere	24	2	1366	23	2	0	0	1	0
12	(England)	MF	Finnlay Wyatt	12	0	356	11	0	0	0	1	0
14	(Japan)	MF	Yudai Imura	23	0	1641	23	0	0	0	0	0
16	(Republic of Ireland)	MF	Patrick McCann	10	0	703	10	0	0	0	0	0
17	(Ghana)	MF	Oscar Umar	14	0	1259	14	0	0	0	0	0
21	(United States)	MF	Chris Durkin	11	0	990	11	0	0	0	0	0
24	(United States)	MF	Jackson Eskay	9	0	415	8	0	0	0	1	0
27	(United States)	MF	Raul Gonzalez	24	2	1842	24	2	0	0	0	0
28	(Ghana)	MF	Samuel Asante	17	0	1225	17	0	0	0	0	0
32	(United States)	MF	Matt Bolduc	15	2	1003	14	2	0	0	1	0
35	(United States)	MF	Brandon Eaton	1	0	90	1	0	0	0	0	0
42	(United States)	MF	Simon Fitch	0	0	0	0	0	0	0	0	0
Forwards
9	(Brazil)	FW	Oliver	16	2	877	15	2	0	0	1	0
10	(Lesotho)	FW	Sunny Jane	25	3	1532	24	3	0	0	1	0
11	(Jamaica)	FW	Anthony Grant	16	0	517	15	0	0	0	1	0
20	(United States)	FW	Mikey Minutillo	15	2	813	14	2	0	0	1	0
45	(Sierra Leone)	FW	Alhaji Kamara	9	4	717	9	4	0	0	0	0
70	(Cameroon)	FW	Franck Tayou	13	1	438	13	1	0	0	0	0
71	(Brazil)	FW	Luiz Fernando	28	2	1751	28	2	0	0	0	0

=== Top scorers ===
Place	Position	Number	Name	USL	USL Cup	Open Cup	Total
1	FW	45	(Sierra Leone) Alhaji Kamara	4	0	0	4
2	FW	10	(Lesotho) Sunny Jane	3	0	0	3
3	MF	4	(Ghana) Fred Sekyere	2	0	0	2
3	FW	9	(Brazil) Oliver	2	0	0	2
3	FW	20	(United States) Mikey Minutillo	2	0	0	2
3	MF	27	(United States) Raul Gonzalez	2	0	0	2
3	MF	32	(United States) Matt Bolduc	2	0	0	2
3	MF	71	(Brazil) Luiz Fernando	2	0	0	2
9	DF	5	(United States) Conor Shanosky	1	0	0	1
9	DF	15	(Canada) Mallan Roberts	1	0	0	1
9	FW	70	(Cameroon) Franck Tayou	1	0	0	1

As of October 17, 2017.

== See also ==
- Richmond Kickers
- 2017 D.C. United season
