= 2016 Richmond Kickers season =

Richmond Kickers
2016 season
- Owner: RKYSC
- Head coach: Leigh Cowlishaw
- Stadium: City Stadium
- USL: 7th place, Eastern Conference
- USL Playoffs: First round
- U.S. Open Cup: Third round
- Top goalscorer: League: Yudai Imura (10); All: Yudai Imura (11)
- Highest home attendance: League: 6,123 (Sep 17 vs. Charleston Battery); All: 7,128 (July 16 vs. Swansea City AFC)
- Lowest home attendance: League: 2,647 (Aug 31 vs. Charleston Battery); All: 1,428 (May 18 vs. Aromas Café)
- Average home league attendance: League: 3,996; All: 1,428
Home colors	Away colors	Third colors

The 2016 Richmond Kickers season was the club's twenty-fourth season of existence. It is also the Kickers' ninth-consecutive year in the third-tier of American soccer, playing in the United Soccer League for their fifth season.

The Kickers finished the season ranked seventh in the Eastern Conference, and earned a berth into the 2016 USL Playoffs. Richmond lost in their first round match-up to Louisville City.

== Non-competitive ==
=== Preseason friendlies ===
February 28	Richmond Kickers	3–1	Longwood Lancers	Bensley
13:00 EDT	Yeisley 44'; Sekyere 63' (pen.) dos Santos 89'		Keilty 34'	Stadium: Ukrop Park

March 5	Richmond Kickers	1–0	Virginia Cavaliers	Bensley
18:00 EDT	Yeisley 35'	Summary		Stadium: Ukrop Park

March 6	Richmond Kickers	0–0	Navy Midshipmen	Bensley
17:00 EDT		Summary		Stadium: Ukrop Park

March 9	Carolina RailHawks	0–1	Richmond Kickers	Cary
11:00 EDT	Pérez (red card)	Summary		Stadium: WakeMed Soccer Park

March 16	Richmond Kickers	1–2	Carolina RailHawks	Richmond
19:00 EDT	Yeisley 7'	Report	Moses 15'; Black 80'	Stadium: City Stadium

March 20	Richmond Kickers	0–2	VCU Rams	Richmond
17:00 EDT	Roberts (yellow card) 20'; Ownby (yellow card) 62'	Summary	Herranz 34'; (yellow card) 52'; Santos 83'	Stadium: City Stadium

=== Midseason friendlies ===
July 16 Friendly	Richmond Kickers (United States)	2–0	(Wales) Swansea City	Richmond
19:00 EDT	Amat 11' (o. g.); Grant 74'			Stadium: City Stadium; Attendance: 7,128; Referee: Patrick Rosas

== Competitive ==
=== USL Regular season ===
==== Standings ====
Pos	Team	Pld	W	D	L	GF	GA	GD	Pts	Qualification
5	Charlotte Independence	30	14	8	8	48	29	+19	50	Conference Playoffs
6	Charleston Battery	30	13	9	8	38	33	+5	48	Conference Playoffs
7	Richmond Kickers	30	12	9	9	33	26	+7	45	Conference Playoffs
8	Orlando City B	30	9	8	13	35	49	−14	35	Conference Playoffs
9	Wilmington Hammerheads FC	30	8	10	12	37	47	−10	34	

Source: 2016 USL Standings
Rules for classification: 1) total wins; 2) total goal differential; 3) total goals scored; 4) points earned against top four Conference finishers; 5) disciplinary points; 6) coin toss or drawing of lots

==== Matches ====
March 26 1	Richmond Kickers	3–1	Harrisburg City Islanders	Richmond
17:00 EDT	Callahan 16'; Yeisley 23'; Imura 48'	Report	Barril 51'	Stadium: City Stadium; Attendance: 5,355; Referee: Mark Gorak

April 1 2	Wilmington Hammerheads	0–0	Richmond Kickers	Wilmington
19:00 EDT	Perone (yellow card) 27'; Parratt (yellow card) 69'	Report	Yeisley (yellow card) 44'; Callahan (yellow card) 80'; Yomby (yellow card) 85'	Stadium: Legion Stadium; Referee: Neil Barbulescu

April 9 3	Richmond Kickers	1–0	Rochester Rhinos	Richmond
17:00 EDT	Imura 61'	Report	Garzi (yellow card) 73'	Stadium: City Stadium; Attendance: 4,990; Referee: Matthew Franz

April 17 4	Bethlehem Steel	2–1	Richmond Kickers	Bethlehem
19:00 EDT	Ayuk 21'; Jones 46' (yellow card) 79'	Report	Imura 50'; Pittman (yellow card) 53'	Stadium: Goodman Stadium; Attendance: 2,417; Referee: Guido Gonzales

April 22 5	Charlotte Independence	3–2	Richmond Kickers	Charlotte
19:00 EDT	Calvert 43'; Alajarín (yellow card) 54'; Brown (yellow card) 61'; Mizell (yellow card) 90'; Herrera 90+2' (pen.)	Report	Jane 20'; Sekyere (yellow card) 26'; Yeisley (yellow card) 86'; Delicâte 89'	Stadium: Ramblewood Soccer Complex; Attendance: 1,239; Referee: David Erbacher

April 30 6	Richmond Kickers	1–0	Toronto FC II	Richmond
17:00 EDT	Ownby 9'	Report		Stadium: City Stadium; Attendance: 3,655

May 7 7	Richmond Kickers	1–0	Wilmington Hammerheads	Richmond
19:00 EDT	Perone 52' (o.g.); Ownby (yellow card) 54'; Asante (yellow card) 90+1'	Report; Box Score	Fairclough (yellow card) 33'; Barnes-Homer (yellow card) 40'; Doue (yellow card) 89'	Stadium: City Stadium; Attendance: 4,209; Referee: Danielle Cheskey

May 11 8	Toronto FC II	1–0	Richmond Kickers	Vaughan
12:00 EDT	Hamilton (yellow card) 39'; Bernal 75'; Bouchard (yellow card) 82'	Report; Box Score		Stadium: Ontario Soccer Centre; Attendance: 1,222; Referee: Yusri Rudolf

May 14 9	New York Red Bulls II	1–1	Richmond Kickers	Harrison
16:00 EDT	Abang 67'	Report; Box Score	Asante (yellow card) 40'; Ownby 90'	Stadium: Red Bull Arena; Attendance: 168; Referee: Jaroslaw Werel

May 21 10	Richmond Kickers	0–0	Louisville City	Richmond
19:00 EDT		Report; Box Score		Stadium: City Stadium; Attendance: 3,411; Referee: Danielle Chesky

May 28 11	Richmond Kickers	1–2	FC Montreal	Richmond
19:00 EDT	Ownby (yellow card) 60', (goal) 88'; Yomby (yellow card) 72'; Asante (red card) 81'	Report; Box Score	Riggi 53'; Béland-Goyette (yellow card) 58'; Tabla 77'; Mkungilwa (yellow card) 90'; Yoseke (yellow card) 90'	Stadium: City Stadium; Attendance: 4,147; Referee: Matthew Kreitzer

June 4 12	FC Cincinnati	1–1	Richmond Kickers	Cincinnati
19:00 EDT	Okoli (yellow card) 7', (goal) 12'; Stevenson (yellow card) 25'	Report; Box Score	Pittman (yellow card) 61'; Lee (yellow card) 68'; Roberts 90'; Ownby (yellow card) 90'	Stadium: Nippert Stadium; Attendance: 11,278; Referee: Luis Guardia

June 11 13	Richmond Kickers	3–1	Pittsburgh Riverhounds	Richmond
17:00 EDT	Murrell 17' (o.g.); Gilstrap 20' (o.g.); Grant 67'	Report	Hertzog 90'	Stadium: City Stadium; Attendance: 4,017; Referee: Jaime Herrera

June 18 14	Charlotte Independence	1–0	Richmond Kickers	Charlotte
19:00 EDT	Calvert 30'; Martinez (yellow card) 35'	Report	Callahan (yellow card) 40'; Paulini (yellow card) 73'	Stadium: Ramblewood Soccer Complex; Attendance: 1,564; Referee: Marco Vega

June 25 15	Richmond Kickers	0–0	Bethlehem Steel	Richmond
19:00 EDT	Troyer (yellow card) 51'; Sekyere (yellow card) 60'	Report	Jones (yellow card) 61'	Stadium: City Stadium; Attendance: 3,982; Referee: Matthew Franz

July 2 16	Charleston Battery	2–0	Richmond Kickers	Charleston
19:30 EDT	Mueller 29'; Cordoves 36'; Marini (red card) 77'	Report	Ownby (yellow card) 86'	Stadium: MUSC Health Stadium; Referee: Vincent Apple-Chiarella

July 8 17	Harrisburg City Islanders	0–3	Richmond Kickers	Lancaster
19:00 EDT			Paulini 11'; Jane 27'; Callahan 75'	Stadium: Clipper Magazine Stadium; Attendance: 1,381; Referee: Christopher Spivey

July 14 18	Pittsburgh Riverhounds	0–2	Richmond Kickers	Pittsburgh
19:00 EDT	Earls (yellow card) 16'; Campbell (yellow card) 44'		Imura 44' (pen.); Jane 67'; Jane (yellow card)	Stadium: Highmark Stadium; Attendance: 1,844

July 23 19	Richmond Kickers	3–0	Toronto FC II	Richmond
19:00 EDT	Aguilar 11'; Imura 49', 70'; Sekyere (yellow card) 59'	Report		Stadium: City Stadium; Attendance: 4,179; Referee: Guido Gonzalez Jr.

July 30 20	Richmond Kickers	2–1	New York Red Bulls II	Richmond
19:00 EDT	Dykstra (yellow card) 6'; Imura 12' (pen.); Eskay 90+3'	Report	Allen 10'; Carroll (yellow card) 13'; Abang (yellow card) 65'; Metzger (yellow card) 90+1'	Stadium: City Stadium; Attendance: 3,113; Referee: Artur Sibiga

August 3 21	Rochester Rhinos	0–1	Richmond Kickers	Rochester
19:05 EDT	Kamdem (yellow card) 74'	Report	Roberts (yellow card) 54'; Sekyere (yellow card) 60'; Asante (yellow card) 70'; Imura 74'; Ownby (yellow card) 77'	Stadium: Sahlen's Stadium; Attendance: 4,217; Referee: Charles Murphy

August 6 22	FC Montreal	1–2	Richmond Kickers	Montréal
15:00 EDT	Beland-Goyette (yellow card) 45'; Riggi 87'	Report	Eskay (yellow card) 23'; Mishu (yellow card) 45'; Durkin (yellow card) 60'; Luiz Fernando 63'; Imura 88'	Stadium: Complexe sportif Claude-Robillard; Attendance: 120; Referee: Chris Grabas

August 13 23	Richmond Kickers	1–1	FC Cincinnati	Richmond
19:00 EDT	Jane 63'; Callahan (yellow card) 81'; Troyer (yellow card) 86'	Report	Okoli (yellow card) 79'; Wiedeman 81'	Stadium: City Stadium; Attendance: 3,093; Referee: Jorge Ramierz

August 17 24	Richmond Kickers	Postponed	Charleston Battery	Richmond
19:00 EDT				Stadium: City Stadium
Note: Match postponed after 20 minutes of play and a 100-minute delay, due to severe weather.

August 21 25	Orlando City B	1–1	Richmond Kickers	Melbourne
19:30 EDT	Cox 44' (pen.); Laryea (yellow card) 52'	Report	Jane 53'; Callahan (red card) 85'	Stadium: Titan Soccer Complex; Attendance: 642; Referee: Christina Unkel

August 27 26	Richmond Kickers	1–0	Orlando City B	Richmond
19:00 EDT	Thomsen 76'	Report		Stadium: City Stadium; Attendance: 3914; Referee: Mark Gorak

August 31 24	Richmond Kickers	1–1	Charleston Battery	Richmond
19:00 EDT	Grant 50'; Jane (yellow card) 88'	Report	Portillo (yellow card) 28' (goal) 69'; Williams (yellow card) 45'; Griffith (yellow card) 90'	Stadium: City Stadium; Attendance: 2647; Referee: JT Alukonis
Note: Rescheduled from August 17. Game was replayed in full.

September 10 27	Louisville City FC	2–0	Richmond Kickers	Louisville
19:30 EDT	Lancaster 18' (pen.) (yellow card) 89'; Craig (yellow card) 45'; Rasmussen 55'; Smith (yellow card) 90'	Report	Asante (yellow card) 67'	Stadium: Louisville Slugger Field; Attendance: 7362; Referee: Brandon Artis

September 14 28	Richmond Kickers	0–0	Charlotte Independence	Richmond
19:00 EDT		Report	Martinez (yellow card) 42'	Stadium: City Stadium; Attendance: 3106; Referee: Matthew Franz

September 17 29	Richmond Kickers	1–2	Charleston Battery	Richmond
17:00 EDT	Imura 34' (pen.)	Report	Ferguson (yellow card) 38'; Guerra (yellow card) 50'; Prince (yellow card) 62'; Williams 71'; Chang 86'	Stadium: City Stadium; Attendance: 6123; Referee: Gary Gutierrez

September 24 30	Wilmington Hammerheads	2–0	Richmond Kickers	Wilmington
19:00 EDT	Barnes-Homer 16'; Mecham 64'; Moose (yellow card) 71'	Report		Stadium: Legion Stadium; Attendance: 3395; Referee: Patrick Schmidt

=== USL Cup ===
October 2 1	Louisville City FC	2–0 (a.e.t.)	Richmond Kickers	Louisville
19:00 EDT	Davis IV 92'; Hoffman 102'	Report	Asante (red card) 5'; Lee (yellow card) 18'; Yeisley (yellow card) 34'; Yomby (yellow card) 40'; Troyer (yellow card) 42'	Stadium: Louisville Slugger Field; Attendance: Andrew Musashe; Referee: 5467

=== U.S. Open Cup ===
The Kickers entered the U.S. Open Cup with the rest of the USL, in the second round.

May 18 Second round	Richmond Kickers (Virginia)	4–0	(Virginia) Charlottesville Alliance FC	Richmond
7:00 PM EDT	Jane 2' (yellow card) 86'; Roberts 25'; Grant 48'; Luiz Fernando 83'	Report; Box Score	Harrison (yellow card) 53'; Clare (yellow card) 61'; Davis (yellow card) 88'; McCartney (yellow card) 89'	Stadium: City Stadium; Attendance: 1,428; Referee: J. T. Alukonis

June 1 Third round	Fort Lauderdale Strikers (Florida)	1–1 (a.e.t.) (2–0 p)	(Virginia) Richmond Kickers	Pembroke Pines
11:00 AM EDT	Gonzalez 2'; Fernandes (yellow card) 43'; Vértiz (yellow card) 97'; Giro (yellow card) 109'	Report	Imura 32'; Grant (yellow card) 71'; Pittman (yellow card) 106'	Stadium: Broward College South Campus Soccer Field; Referee: Caleb Mendez
	Penalties
	Victor (penalty scored); Núñez (penalty missed); Santos (penalty missed); Moura (penalty scored)		Imura (penalty missed); Paulini (penalty missed); Yeisley (penalty missed); Luiz Fernando (penalty missed)

== Transfers ==
=== In ===
Date	Player	Club	Fee	Ref
January 6, 2016	(Lesotho) Sunny Jane	(United States) Wilmington Hammerheads	Free	
February 23, 2016	(Brazil) Luiz Fernando Nascimento	(Brazil) Corinthians	Undisclosed	
February 23, 2016	(Brazil) Romulo Peretta	(Brazil) Corinthians	Undisclosed	
March 8, 2016	(United States) Sawyer Gaffney	(United States) Richmond Kickers Academy	Academy signing	
March 14, 2016	(Argentina) Lucas Paulini	(United States) Atlanta Silverbacks	Free	
March 24, 2016	(United States) Jackson Eskay	(United States) William & Mary Tribe	Free	
April 5, 2016	(United States) Travis Pittman	(United States) Missouri Comets	Free	

=== Out ===
Date	Player	Club	Fee	Ref
January 6, 2016	(United States) George Davis IV	(United States) Louisville City	Free	

== Statistics ==
=== First team roster ===
No.	Position	Nation	Player
0	GK	USA	Sawyer Gaffney
1	GK	USA	Ryan Taylor
2	DF	CMR	Yomby William
4	DF	GHA	Fred Sekyere
5	MF	USA	Michael Callahan
7	FW	ENG	Matthew Delicâte
8	DF	USA	Hugh Roberts
9	DF	JAM	Anthony Grant
10	FW	LES	Sunny Jane
11	FW	BRA	Luiz Fernando
12	FW	BRA	Rômulo Peretta
14	MF	JPN	Yudai Imura
15	MF	ARG	Lucas Paulini
16	MF	ENG	Paul Clowes (on loan from D.C. United)
17	FW	USA	Jason Yeisley
18	DF	GUM	Alex Lee
20	DF	USA	Jalen Robinson (HGP; on loan from D.C. United)
21	MF	USA	Nate Shiffman
22	FW	USA	Brian Ownby
23	DF	GER	Sascha Görres
24	MF	USA	Jackson Eskay
25	MF	USA	Travis Pittman
26	MF	MEX	Miguel Aguilar (on loan from D.C. United)
27	MF	USA	Collin Martin (HGP; on loan from D.C. United)
28	MF	GHA	Samuel Asante
29	MF	USA	Conor Shanosky
30	GK	USA	Charlie Horton (on loan from D.C. United)
31	DF	USA	Braeden Troyer
32	MF	USA	Scott Thomsen
34	DF	USA	Luke Mishu (on loan from D.C. United)
36	GK	USA	Ronnie Pascale
37	MF	USA	Chris Durkin (HGP; on loan from D.C. United)
40	GK	USA	Matt Turner (on loan from New England Revolution)
45	MF	USA	Simon Finch
46	GK	USA	Mark Nankervis
48	GK	USA	Travis Worra (on loan from D.C. United)
50	GK	USA	Andrew Dykstra (on loan from D.C. United)

=== Goals and assists ===
No.	Pos.	Name	USL		USL Playoffs		U.S. Open Cup		Total	
No.	Pos.	Name	Goals	Assists	Goals	Assists	Goals	Assists	Goals	Assists
14	MF	(Japan) Yudai Imura	10	2	0	0	1	0	11	2
10	FW	(Lesotho) Sunny Jane	4	1	0	0	1	0	5	1
9	DF	(Jamaica) Anthony Grant	3	1	0	0	1	1	4	2
22	FW	(United States) Brian Ownby	3	3	0	0	0	0	3	3
11	FW	(Brazil) Luiz Fernando Nascimento	1	1	0	0	1	0	2	1
8	DF	(United States) Hugh Roberts	1	0	0	0	1	0	2	0
5	MF	(United States) Michael Callahan	2	0	0	0	0	0	2	0
17	FW	(United States) Jason Yeisley	1	1	0	0	0	0	1	1
15	MF	(Argentina) Lucas Paulini	1	1	0	0	0	0	1	1
32	MF	(United States) Scott Thomsen	1	1	0	0	0	0	1	1
7	FW	(England) Matthew Delicâte	1	0	0	0	0	0	1	0
24	MF	(United States) Jackson Eskay	1	0	0	0	0	0	1	0
26	MF	(Mexico) Miguel Aguilar	1	0	0	0	0	0	1	0
4	DF	(Ghana) Fred Owusu Sekyere	0	2	0	0	0	0	0	2
18	DF	(Guam) Alex Lee	0	2	0	0	0	0	0	2
25	MF	(United States) Travis Pittman	0	0	0	0	0	1	0	1
28	MF	(Ghana) Samuel Asante	0	1	0	0	0	0	0	1

=== Disciplinary record ===
No.	Pos.	Name	USL		USL Playoffs		U.S. Open Cup		Total	
No.	Pos.	Name	Booked	Sent off (straight red)	Booked	Sent off (straight red)	Booked	Sent off (straight red)	Booked	Sent off (straight red)
5	MF	Michael Callahan	6	1	0	0	0	0	6	1
28	MF	Samuel Asante	5	1	0	1	0	0	5	2
22	FW	Brian Ownby	5	0	0	0	0	0	5	0
18	DF	Alex Lee	3	1	1	0	0	0	4	1
4	DF	Fred Owusu Sekyere	4	0	0	0	0	0	4	0
25	MF	Travis Pittman	2	0	0	0	1	0	3	0
17	FW	Jason Yeisley	2	0	1	0	0	0	3	0
31	DF	Braeden Troyer	2	0	1	0	0	0	3	0
2	DF	William Yomby	2	0	1	0	0	0	3	0
10	FW	Sunny Jane	2	0	0	0	1	0	2	0
8	DF	Hugh Roberts	1	0	0	0	0	0	1	0
9	DF	Anthony Grant	0	0	0	0	1	0	1	0
15	MF	Lucas Paulini	1	0	0	0	0	0	1	0
24	MF	Jackson Eskay	1	0	0	0	0	0	1	0
34	DF	Luke Mishu	1	0	0	0	0	0	1	0
37	MF	Chris Durkin	1	0	0	0	0	0	1	0
50	GK	Andrew Dykstra	1	0	0	0	0	0	1	0
