= Luiz Fernando (footballer, born 1997) =

Brazilian footballer

Personal information
- Full name: Luiz Fernando Nascimento
- Date of birth: 23 June 1997 (age 29)
- Place of birth: Brazil
- Height: 1.75 m (5 ft 9 in)
- Position: Winger

Team information
- Current team: Hanoi FC
- Number: 80

Youth career
- Corinthians

Senior career*
Years	Team	Apps	(Gls)
–2016	Flamengo de Guarulhos	0	(0)
2016–2018	Richmond Kickers	77	(7)
2019–2020	Atlanta United 2	33	(2)
2019–2020	Atlanta United	0	(0)
2021	Tampa Bay Rowdies	0	(0)
2022–2024	Memphis 901	86	(15)
2024–2025	New Mexico United	16	(4)
2025–2026	Hanoi FC	17	(2)
- * Club domestic league appearances and goals as of 7 June 2026

Luiz Fernando Nascimento (born 23 June 1997) is a Brazilian professional footballer who plays as a winger for V.League 1 side Hanoi FC.

== Early career ==
Luiz Fernando played for the Sport Club Corinthians Paulista youth academy and played for their U-20 team. He also played briefly for Flamengo de Guarulhos.

== Playing career ==
Luiz Fernando signed with the Richmond Kickers on 23 February 2016. On 26 March 2016, Luiz Fernando made his professional debut for the Kickers, coming on for Yudai Imura in the 75th minute, en route to a 3–1 victory over the Harrisburg City Islanders. On 18 May 2016, Luiz Fernando scored his first goal for the Kickers in a U.S. Open Cup fixture against Aromas Café FC, scoring in the 83rd minute of the match en route to a 4–0 victory. Fernando remained a mainstay on the Kickers throughout the 2017 and 2018 seasons, tallying 78 total appearances, scoring 6 goals.

On 19 November 2018, Fernando signed for USL Championship side Atlanta United 2.

Fernando became the first second-team player to sign a first-team contract with Atlanta United on 21 August 2019. Fernando made his Atlanta United debut on 26 February 2020 in a CONCACAF Champions League match against Motagua.

On 1 July 2020 Fernando was waived by Atlanta United which cleared an international roster slot for Mexican winger Jürgen Damm who was signed the same day.

On 30 December 2020, it was announced that Fernando would join USL Championship side Tampa Bay Rowdies ahead of their 2021 season. Following the 2021 season it was announced that Fernando would leave the Rowdies.

On 17 February 2022, Fernando joined USL Championship club Memphis 901 ahead of their 2022 season.

On 1 January 2025, New Mexico United announced that Fernando had signed with the club for the 2025 season.

On 21 August 2025, Fernando was transferred to V.League 1 club Hanoi FC, signing a one-year contract.

== Statistics ==
As of 22 June, 2025

Club	Season	League			Cup		League Cup		Other^{[A]}		Total	
Club	Season	Division	Apps	Goals	Apps	Goals	Apps	Goals	Apps	Goals	Apps	Goals
United States			League		US Open Cup		USL Playoffs		North America		Total	
Richmond Kickers	2016	USL Championship	21	2	2	1	—		—		23	3
Richmond Kickers	2017	USL Championship	28	2	0	0	—		—		28	2
Richmond Kickers	2018	USL Championship	28	3	2	2	—		—		30	5
Atlanta United 2	2019	USL Championship	32	2	0	0	—		—		32	2
Atlanta United 2	2020	USL Championship	1	0	0	0	—		—		1	0
Atlanta United	2020	Major League Soccer	0	0	0	0	—		1	0	1	0
Tampa Bay Rowdies	2021	USL Championship	0	0	—		—		—		0	0
Memphis 901	2022	USL Championship	28	4	1	0	1	0	—		30	4
Memphis 901	2023	USL Championship	27	8	3	0	—		—		30	8
Memphis 901	2024	USL Championship	30	3	2	0	—		—		32	3
New Mexico United	2025	USL Championship	16	4	1	0			—		17	4
Total	United States		211	28	11	3	1	0	1	0	224	31
Career statistics			211	28	11	3	1	0	1	0	224	31
