= José Galli Neto =

Brazilian footballer (1950–2025)

Personal information
- Date of birth: 12 March 1950
- Place of birth: São Paulo, Brazil
- Date of death: 9 July 2025 (aged 75)
- Place of death: Ribeirão Preto, São Paulo, Brazil
- Position: Right-back

Senior career*
Years	Team	Apps	(Gls)
1968–1971	Botafogo-SP		
1972–1973	Ponte Preta		
1974	Corinthians	23	(1)
1974–1975	Portuguesa	23	(0)
1975–1976	Dom Bosco		
1977–1979	XV de Jaú		
1980	Noroeste		
1981	Atlético Goianiense		

Managerial career
- 1981: Noroeste
- 1982–1984: XV de Jaú
- 1989–1991: Botafogo-SP
- 1991: Ituano
- 1992: Ponte Preta
- 1992: Portuguesa
- 1993: XV de Piracicaba
- 1993: Joinville
- 1993: Juventus-SP
- 1993: Vila Nova
- 1994: Ferroviária
- 1994: XV de Piracicaba
- 1994: Vila Nova
- 1994: Botafogo-SP
- 1995: Ferroviária
- 1995–1996: Sãocarlense
- 1996: Botafogo-SP
- 1996: Francana
- 1996: Marília
- 1997: Atlético Goianiense
- 1997: Joinville
- 1998: Atlético Goianiense
- 1998: Joinville
- 1998: Ferroviária
- 1999: São José-SP
- 1999: Fortaleza
- 1999: Ferroviária
- 2000: Flamengo-SP
- 2001: Ituano
- 2002: Nacional-AM
- 2002: Caxias
- 2002: Botafogo-SP
- 2002: Flamengo-SP
- 2003: Caxias
- 2003: Caldense
- 2004: Flamengo-SP
- 2004: Joinville
- 2004: Caldense
- 2005: Avaí
- 2005: Botafogo-SP
- 2006: Comercial-SP
- 2006: Botafogo-SP
- 2006: Gama
- 2007: Taquaritinga
- 2007: Batatais
- 2009–2010: Botafogo-SP
- 2011: Sertãozinho
- 2011: Botafogo-SP
- 2012: Marília
- 2012: Marcílio Dias
- 2018: Olímpia
- * Club domestic league appearances and goals

José Galli Neto (12 March 1950 – 9 July 2025) was a Brazilian professional footballer who played as right back and a manager.

== Playing career ==
A right-back, Galli began his professional career with Botafogo de Ribeirão Preto, where he played from 1968 to 1971. He later played for Ponte Preta and in 1973 joined Corinthians, where he made 23 appearances and scored one goal. In 1974–75, he played for Portuguesa de Desportos, where he was a reserve for most of the time, also appearing in 23 matches. Towards the end of his career, he played for Dom Bosco-MT, XV de Jaú, Noroeste, and Atlético Goianiense.

== Managerial career ==
Galli began his coaching career shortly after retiring as an athlete, at EC Noroeste in 1981. Over the years he managed more than thirty Brazilian football teams, notably Botafogo-SP, where he had several spells and was champion of Série A3 and the Campeonato do Interior. His last managerial role was with Olímpia in 2018.

== Death ==
Galli died in Ribeirão Preto on 9 July 2025, after being hospitalized for two weeks. He was 75.

== Honours ==
=== Manager ===
Botafogo-SP

- Campeonato Paulista Série A3: 2006
- Campeonato Paulista do Interior: 2010
