= Enderson =

Enderson is a given name. It may refer to:

- Enderson Moreira (born 1971), Brazilian football manager
- Enderson (footballer) (born 1988), Enderson Norgentern de Oliveira, Brazilian football goalkeeper
- Enderson Franco (born 1992), Venezuelan baseball player
