= Matt Turner (soccer) =

American soccer player (born 1994)

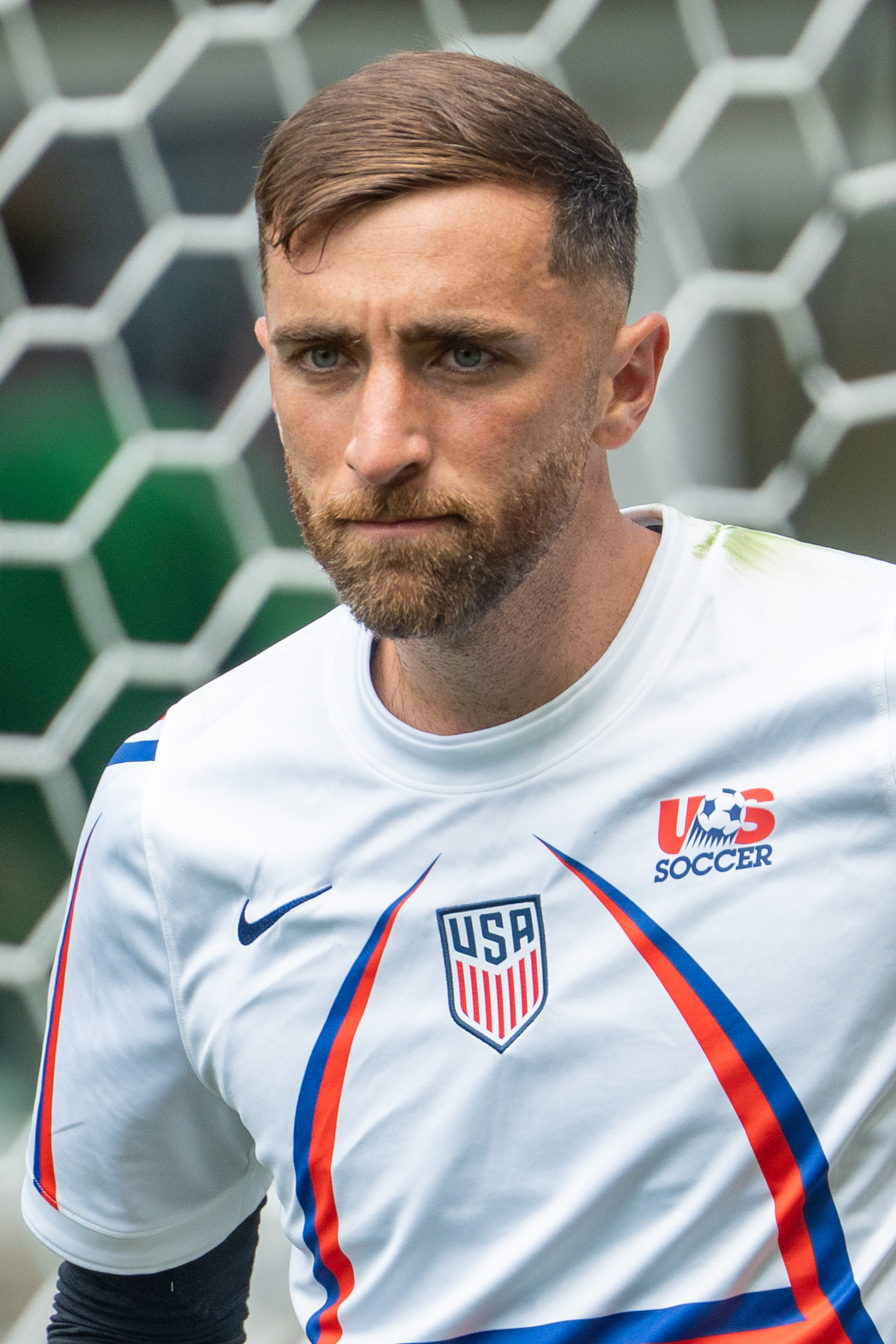
- Turner with the United States in 2026

Personal information
- Full name: Matthew Charles Turner
- Date of birth: June 24, 1994 (age 32)
- Place of birth: Park Ridge, New Jersey, U.S.
- Height: 6 ft 3 in (1.91 m)
- Position: Goalkeeper

Team information
- Current team: New England Revolution (on loan from Lyon)
- Number: 30

College career
Years	Team	Apps	(Gls)
2012–2015	Fairfield Stags	39	(0)

Senior career*
Years	Team	Apps	(Gls)
2014–2015	Jersey Express	24	(0)
2016–2022	New England Revolution	102	(0)
2016–2017	→ Richmond Kickers (loan)	27	(0)
2022–2023	Arsenal	0	(0)
2023–2025	Nottingham Forest	17	(0)
2024–2025	→ Crystal Palace (loan)	0	(0)
2025–	Lyon	0	(0)
2025–	→ New England Revolution (loan)	44	(0)

International career^{‡}
2021–	United States	55	(0)
Medal record
Men's soccer
Representing United States
CONCACAF Gold Cup
Winner	2021
Runner-up	2025 Canada–United States
CONCACAF Nations League
Winner	2023
Winner	2024
- * Club domestic league appearances and goals as of November 7, 2026 ‡ National team caps and goals as of June 25, 2026

Matthew Charles Turner (born June 24, 1994) is an American professional soccer player who plays as a goalkeeper for Major League Soccer club New England Revolution, on loan from Ligue 1 club Lyon, and the United States national team.

Turner played for Fairfield University and went undrafted in the 2016 MLS SuperDraft, though signed with Major League Soccer club New England Revolution after a successful preseason trial. After two seasons he became the club's primary goalkeeper, later winning the MLS Goalkeeper of the Year award in 2021. In 2022, Turner joined Premier League club Arsenal and the following year moved to Nottingham Forest. In his second season, he went on loan with Crystal Palace, where he won the FA Cup in 2025.

Turner made his debut for the United States in January 2021 at age 27, quickly becoming the team's starting goalkeeper. With the U.S., he won the CONCACAF Gold Cup in 2021 and the CONCACAF Nations League in 2023 and 2024, winning the best goalkeeper award for the 2021 and 2023 competitions.

== Early career ==
A native of Park Ridge, New Jersey, Turner attended Saint Joseph Regional High School. Turner did not play soccer until he was 14 years old, initially taking up the sport to stay in shape for his primary sports of basketball and baseball. He started playing in goal when the only other goalkeeper for his freshman team was injured at tryouts.

Turner spent his entire collegiate career at Fairfield University. He made a total of 39 appearances for the Stags and finished with 21 shutouts. He was named to the All-Metro Atlantic Athletic Conference second team during his senior season. In 2013, ESPN SportsCenter's "Not Top 10" segment featured him as the #1 worst play of the day for putting the ball in his own net after it bounced high off the crossbar.

He also played in the Premier Development League for Jersey Express, leading the team to the PDL national semifinals in 2014.

== Club career ==
=== New England Revolution ===
Turner was not selected in the 2016 MLS SuperDraft, but he signed a professional contract with Major League Soccer (MLS) club New England Revolution on March 3, 2016, after a successful preseason trial.

==== 2016–17 seasons ====
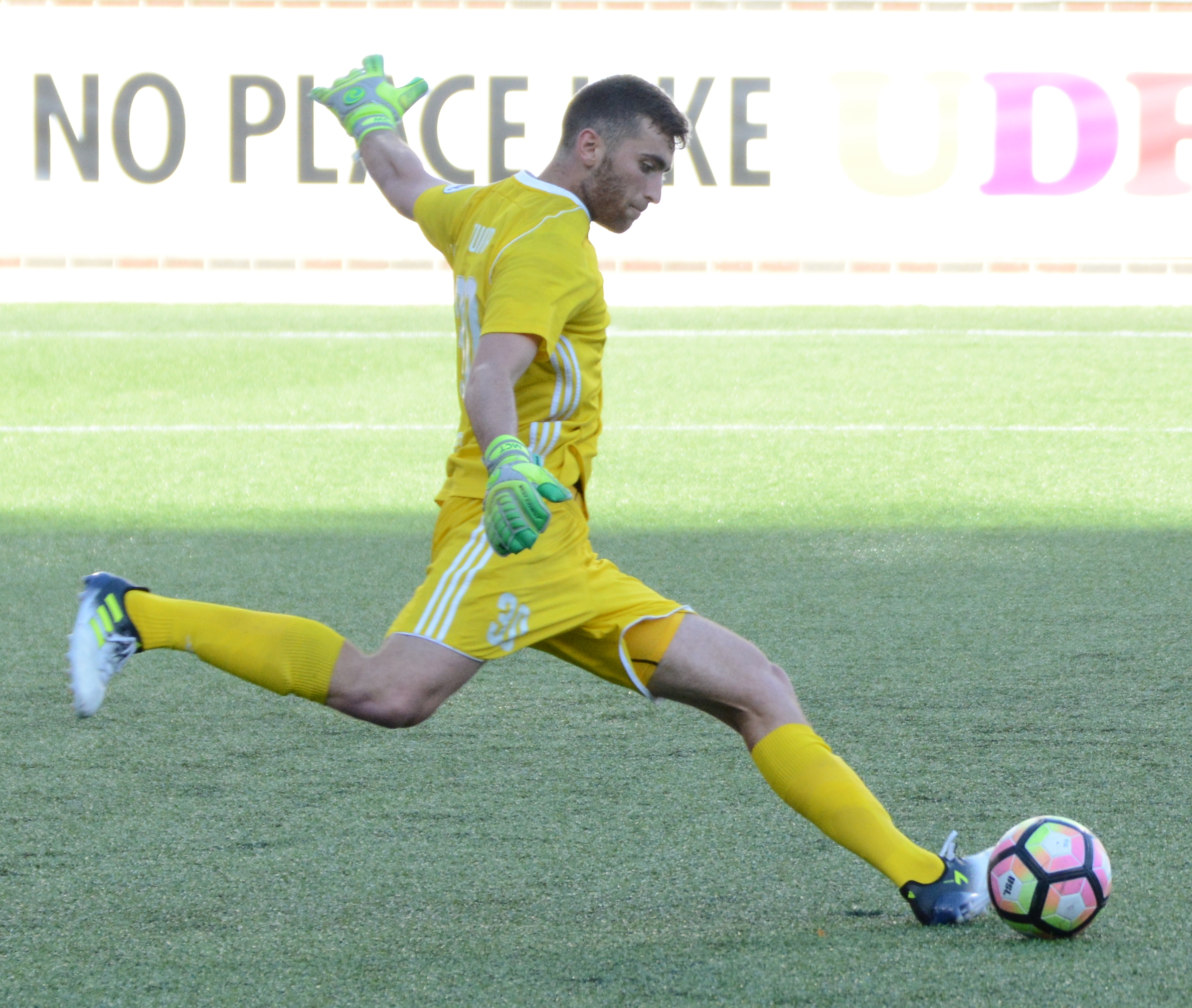
Turner playing for Richmond Kickers against FC Cincinnati in 2017

On April 29, he joined United Soccer League club Richmond Kickers on loan and made his professional debut a day later in a 1–0 victory over Toronto FC II. During his two loan stints with the Kickers, Turner recorded seven shutouts in 27 starts.

==== 2018 season ====
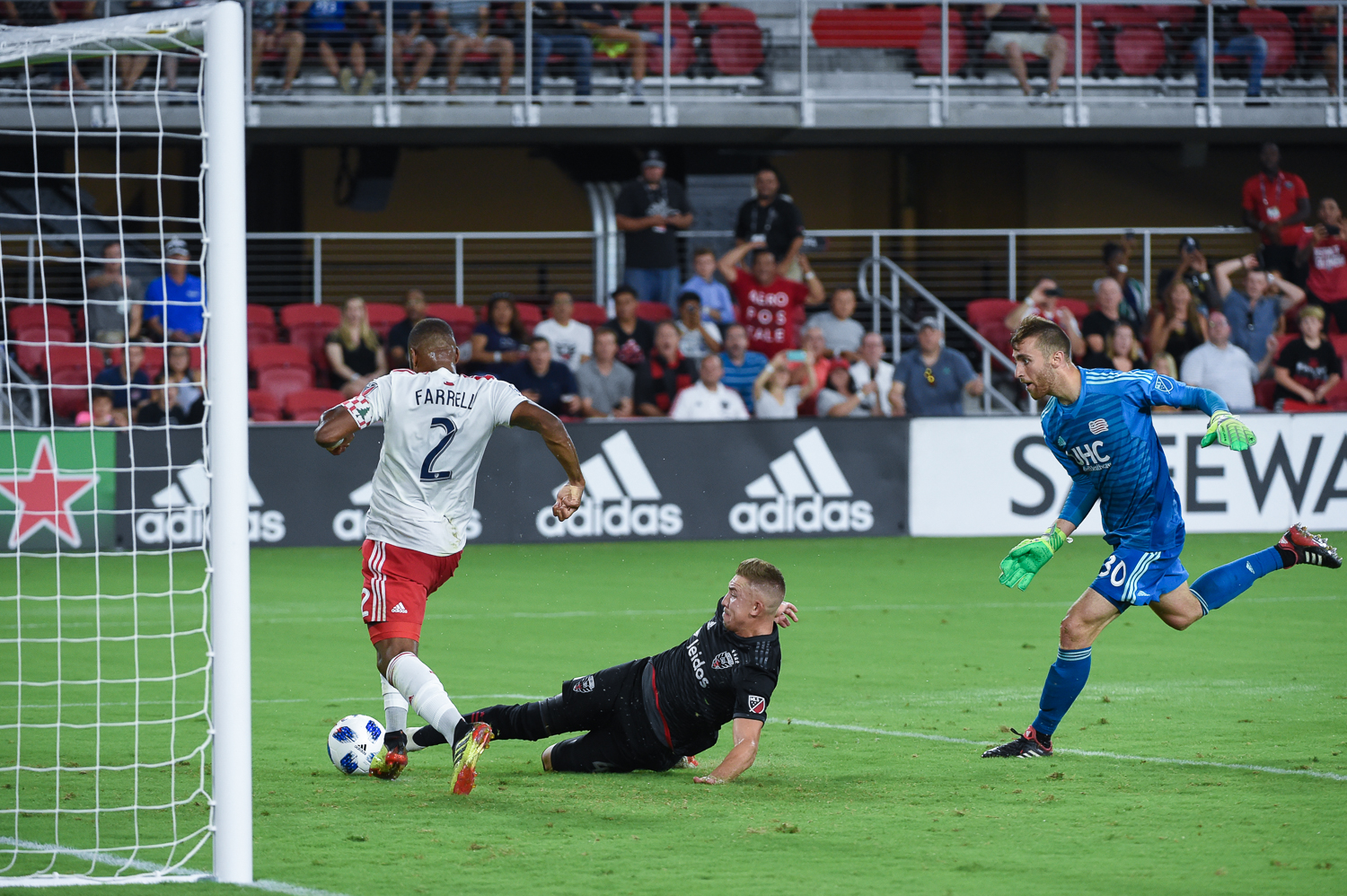
Turner (right) during a Revolution match against D.C. United in 2018

Turner earned the starting job for the Revolution entering the 2018 season, beating out Brad Knighton and Cody Cropper for the job. He made his MLS debut on March 3, 2018, in the Revolution's season opener against Philadelphia Union, making four saves in a 2–0 loss. Turner started all four of New England's matches to open the season, recording a 1.25 goals against average and 16 saves throughout that period. On March 31, 2018, he made six saves and recorded his first MLS clean sheet in the club's 2–0 win at BBVA Compass Stadium against Houston Dynamo FC. It was the first clean sheet a Revolution keeper had recorded since August 24, 2016. He recorded four more clean sheets over the 2018 season.

==== 2019 season ====
After a difficult start to the 2019 season which saw Turner drop to third string behind Cropper and Knighton, he re-emerged as the starter for the club, ultimately starting 20 matches and recording five clean sheets. Turner would lead the Revolution to its first playoff match since 2015. It was also Turner's first playoff match. He started in the Revolution's 1–0 away loss to Atlanta United FC in the first round of the 2019 MLS Cup Playoffs. Turner finished as an MLS goalkeeper of the year finalist, ranking fifth in voting behind winner Vito Mannone, D.C. United's Bill Hamid, New York City FC's Sean Johnson, and Atlanta's Brad Guzan.

==== 2020 season ====
Turner had a stand-out season in 2020 and was subsequently named as a finalist for the MLS Goalkeeper of the Year Award. Over the course of the season, Turner started 22 of the team's 23 matches, recording an 8–7–8 record, setting a new club record for goals against per game (1.08), recording six shut-outs, and leading his team to a second consecutive trip to the MLS Cup Playoffs. At the conclusion of the season, Turner ranked second in Revs history in saves percentage and goals against average (1.36). He additionally finished as the leader ranked among the top-10 MLS goalkeepers in saves percentage, goals against average, and saves. His save percentage was the highest of any MLS keeper since the start of the 2019 season. He ultimately finished the season second in voting for the MLS goalkeeper of the year, behind Andre Blake.

In round one of the 2020 MLS Cup Playoffs, Turner recorded a clean sheet against the Supporters' Shield-holding Philadelphia Union in the Revolution's 2–0 win. Turner then saved a Nani penalty kick in the Revolution's Eastern Conference semifinal 3–1 victory over Orlando City SC.

In 2020, New England Revolution fans voted Turner the Revolution team MVP, his teammates voted him the Revolution Player of the Year, and Revolution supporters group the Midnight Riders voted him the Midnight Riders Man of the Year.

==== 2021 season ====
Turner continued to play well over the course of the 2021 season, recording a 1.25 goals-against average, a 73.2 save percentage, and five shutouts over 28 starts. He was named the 2021 MLS Goalkeeper of the Year. He was the first keeper in Revolution history to earn the honor. During the 2021 season, Turner was named 2021 MLS All-Star Game MVP after making two penalty saves against the Liga MX All stars on August 25, 2021. He also set a club record with 17 regular season wins, which was tied for the most in the league.

=== Arsenal ===
On February 11, 2022, it was announced that Turner and Premier League club Arsenal had agreed to a deal that would see him move to the London club in the summer of 2022. He was Arsenal's first summer signing of the window. Arsenal reportedly paid a transfer fee of $6 million that could potentially rise to $10 million. On June 27, 2022, Arsenal announced Turner as the new player on a long-term contract. Turner was given the number 30 shirt.

Turner started Arsenal's July 8, 2022, friendly at 1. FC Nürnberg. Arsenal won the match 5–3.

On September 8, 2022, Turner started against FC Zürich during the 2022–23 UEFA Europa League group stage, which Arsenal won 2–1. On October 6, Turner recorded his first clean sheet for the club in a 3–0 win against Bodø/Glimt at the Emirates in the subsequent Europa League fixture. Following this, Turner recorded back-to-back clean sheets in further Europa League wins against Bodø/Glimt again and PSV Eindhoven. The former of the two performances, a 1–0 away win at the Aspmyra Stadion on October 13, drew praise from Arsenal manager Mikel Arteta. Turner concluded his Arsenal career with seven appearances across all competitions, recording four clean sheets.

=== Nottingham Forest ===
With Arsenal bringing in David Raya as an additional goalkeeper, Turner became expendable during the summer transfer window of 2023. On August 9, 2023, Nottingham Forest announced the signing of Turner from Arsenal on a four-year deal for a reported fee of £10 million ($12.75 million). He made his Premier League debut for Forest 3 days later, away to Arsenal, in a 2–1 loss. He recorded his first clean sheet on September 2, 2023, in a 1–0 victory over Chelsea at Stamford Bridge.

==== Loan to Crystal Palace ====
On August 30, 2024, Crystal Palace announced the loan signing of Turner from Nottingham Forest for the duration of the 2024–25 season. He made his debut for the club on October 30, in the EFL Cup round of 16, performing eight saves in a 2–1 victory over Aston Villa at Villa Park.

=== Lyon ===
On June 10, 2025, Turner signed with Ligue 1 club Lyon for a reported €8 million (£6.74m).

==== Loan to New England Revolution ====
Turner with the New England Revolution in 2026

On August 1, 2025, Turner was loaned to the New England Revolution of Major League Soccer from Olympique Lyonnais through June 2026. He made his first appearance on August 9 in a 2–0 victory over D.C. United, collecting his 23rd clean sheet as a member of the Revolution in the process. Turner joined a strong squad of goalkeepers including former MLS cup champion Alex Bono, Donovan Parisian and JD Gunn. Turner was unable to lead the Revolution to the playoffs as they finished the 2025 MLS season in 11th place.

On July 13, 2026, Turner's loan to New England was extended to the end of the 2026 Major League Soccer season, with a club option to extend the loan to the end of the mini 2027 Major League Soccer season, which the club would then have an option to exercise a purchase option. On October 28 Turner set a club record, recording his 18th win of the season in the Revolution's 3-2 victory over New York Red Bulls.

== International career ==
=== 2021: Senior debut and first CONCACAF Gold Cup ===
Turner made his international debut on January 31, 2021, for the United States men's national team, starting in goal in a 7–0 friendly victory against Trinidad and Tobago. Turner recorded a clean sheet, saving a penalty kick from Alvin Jones.

Turner started in all six games for the United States in the 2021 CONCACAF Gold Cup. He recorded five clean sheets, including one in a 1–0 win against Mexico in the final. For his performance, Turner was awarded "Best Goalkeeper" of the tournament.

=== 2022–2024: First FIFA World Cup and CONCACAF Nations League title ===
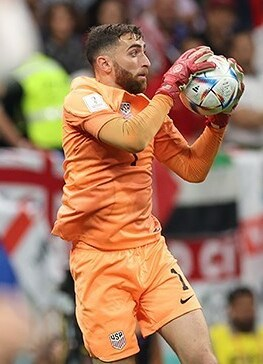
Turner catching the ball during United States' match against England in the 2022 FIFA World Cup in Qatar.

Turner was selected for the United States squad that competed in the 2022 FIFA World Cup in Qatar, where he played as the primary goalkeeper and was one of three players to feature in all 360 minutes of the tournament for the American squad. Turner kept two clean sheets in the tournament, becoming the first U.S. goalkeeper to record multiple clean sheets in one edition of the FIFA World Cup since 1930.

Turner started in both games for the United States at the 2023 CONCACAF Nations League Finals, keeping clean sheets against both Mexico and Canada in 3–0 and 2–0 wins respectively as the United States won the competition. Alongside winning the Nations League title, Turner was selected as the best goalkeeper in the Nations League and was also named to the CNL Finals Best XI.

Furthermore, Turner was named to the United States roster for the 2023 CONCACAF Gold Cup. In the opening Group A match versus Jamaica, Turner saved a penalty from Leon Bailey as the United States drew 1–1. In the knockout stage quarterfinal matchup against Canada, the game went to penalties after extra time. Turner then saved two penalties during the shootout, stonewalling both Steven Vitoria and Liam Fraser en route to a United States victory and man of the match honors.

On June 12, 2024, he saved 11 shots in the friendly 1–1 draw against Brazil, the most for a U.S. goalkeeper since Tim Howard's 15 at the 2014 FIFA World Cup against Belgium.

=== 2026: Second World Cup ===
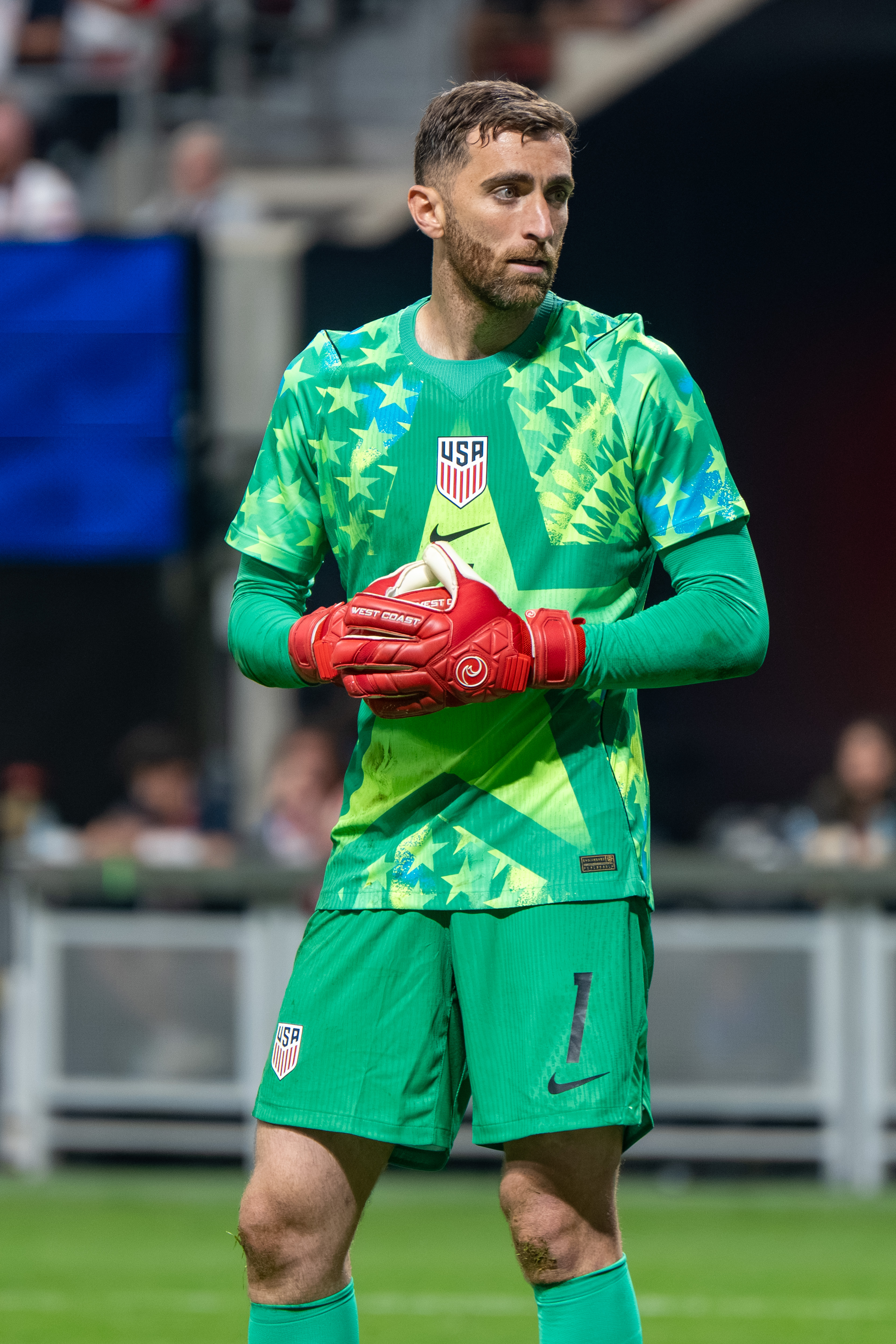
Turner playing for the United States in 2026.

Turner was selected in the 26-man squad for the 2026 FIFA World Cup. He served as the backup goalkeeper behind Matt Freese, who had started all but one of the United States' last 14 matches before the tournament. His lone action of the World Cup came in the last game of the group stage against Turkey, where he surrendered three goals including the game winner on the 98th minute.

== Personal life ==
Turner is Jewish. Turner and his father both obtained Lithuanian passports in 2020; Turner's paternal great-grandmother fled from ethnic persecution during World War II, and as Jews emigrated from Lithuania. His father's family is Jewish, and they Anglicized their surname from "Turnovski" to "Turner" at Ellis Island when immigrating, whereas his mother's family is Catholic.

He married ex-National Football League cheerleader Ashley Herron in 2022. They have a son (born 2022) and a daughter (born 2023).

In 2018, Turner, alongside teammate Andrew Farrell, reenacted multiple scenes from the film Elf in an online series posted by the Revolution.

Turner, who was a baseball player in high school, threw out the ceremonial first pitch at a Boston Red Sox game on August 12, 2021.

== Career statistics ==
=== Club ===
As of match played November 21, 2026

Appearances and goals by club, season and competition
Club	Season	League			National cup (Note: Includes U.S. Open Cup, FA Cup)		League cup (Note: Includes EFL Cup)		Continental		Other		Total	
Club	Season	Division	Apps	Goals	Apps	Goals	Apps	Goals	Apps	Goals	Apps	Goals	Apps	Goals
New England Revolution	2016	MLS	0	0	—		—		—		—		0	0
New England Revolution	2017	MLS	0	0	—		—		—		—		0	0
New England Revolution	2018	MLS	27	0	—		—		—		0	0	27	0
New England Revolution	2019	MLS	20	0	2	0	—		—		1 (Note: Appearance in MLS Cup playoffs)	0	23	0
New England Revolution	2020	MLS	22 (Note: Includes three appearances in MLS is Back Tournament group stage)	0	—		—		0	0	5 (Note: One appearance in MLS is Back Tournament knockout stage, four appearances in MLS Cup playoffs)	0	27	0
New England Revolution	2021	MLS	28	0	0	0	—		—		1	0	29	0
New England Revolution	2022	MLS	5	0	—		—		—		—		5	0
New England Revolution	Total		102	0	2	0	—		—		7	0	111	0
Richmond Kickers (loan)	2016	USL	7	0	0	0	—		—		—		7	0
Richmond Kickers (loan)	2017	USL	20	0	0	0	—		—		—		20	0
Richmond Kickers (loan)	Total		27	0	—		—		—		—		27	0
Arsenal	2022–23	Premier League	0	0	2	0	0	0	5 (Note: Appearances in UEFA Europa League)	0	—		7	0
Nottingham Forest	2023–24	Premier League	17	0	2	0	1	0	—		—		20	0
Crystal Palace (loan)	2024–25	Premier League	0	0	3	0	1	0	—		—		4	0
New England Revolution (loan)	2025	MLS	10	0	—		—		—		—		10	0
New England Revolution (loan)	2026	MLS	34	0	0	0	—		—		1	0	35	0
New England Revolution (loan)	Total		44	0	0	0	—		—		1	0	45	0
Career total			190	0	9	0	2	0	5	0	8	0	214	0

=== International ===
As of match played June 25, 2026

Appearances and goals by national team and year
National team	Year	Apps	Goals
United States	2021	13	0
United States	2022	11	0
United States	2023	13	0
United States	2024	12	0
United States	2025	3	0
United States	2026	3	0
Total		55	0

== Honors ==
New England Revolution

- Supporters' Shield: 2021

Arsenal

- FA Community Shield: 2023

Crystal Palace

- FA Cup: 2024–25

United States

- CONCACAF Gold Cup: 2021
- CONCACAF Nations League: 2022–23, 2023–24

Individual

- CONCACAF Gold Cup Golden Glove: 2021
- CONCACAF Gold Cup Best XI: 2021
- MLS All-Star: 2021
- MLS All-Star Game MVP: 2021
- MLS Goalkeeper of the Year: 2021
- MLS Best XI: 2021
- CONCACAF Nations League Golden Glove: 2022–23, 2023–24
- CONCACAF Nations League Finals Best XI: 2023, 2024

== See also ==
- List of Jewish footballers
- List of Jews in sports
