= Faxinal =

- Municipality
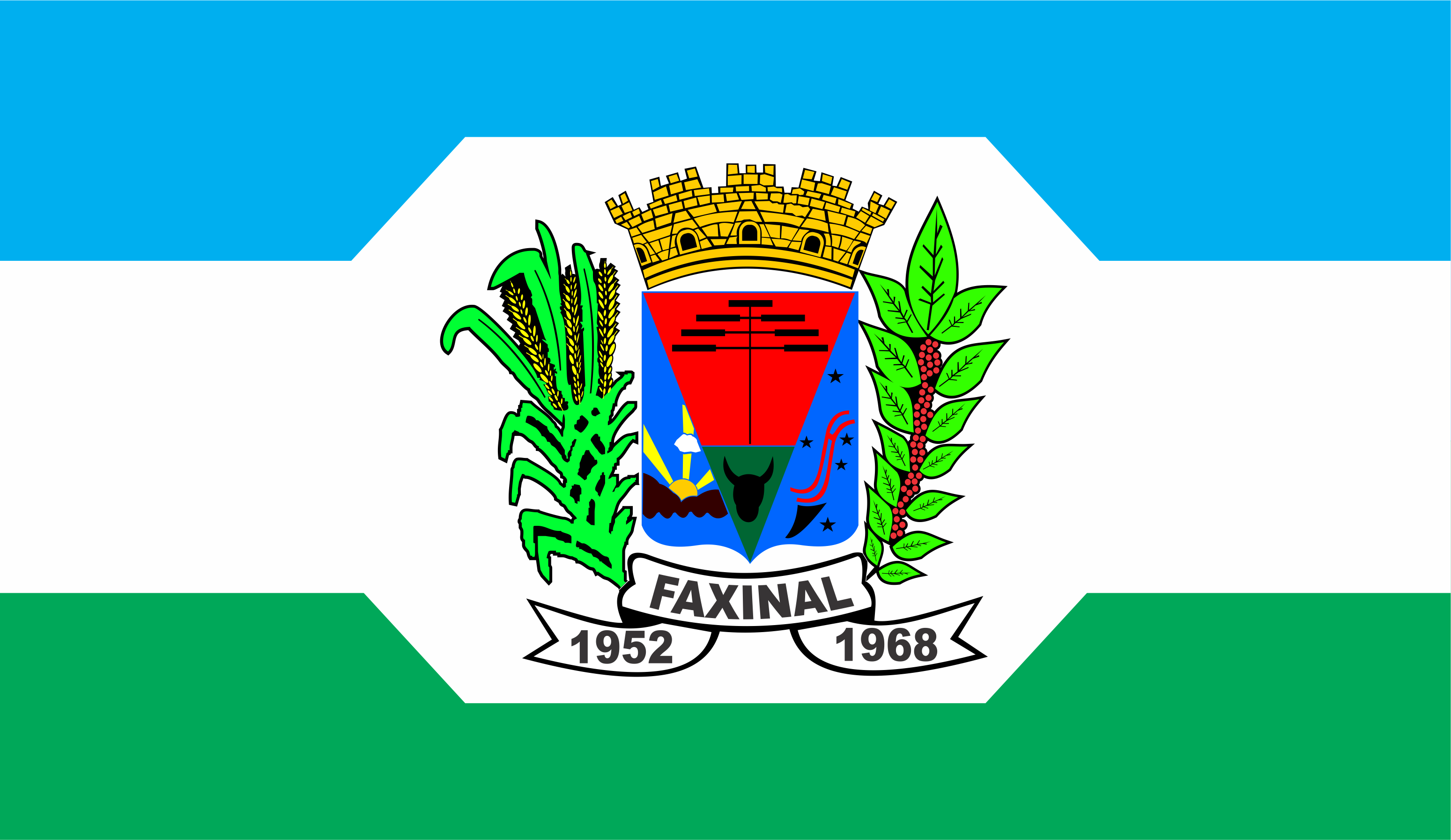
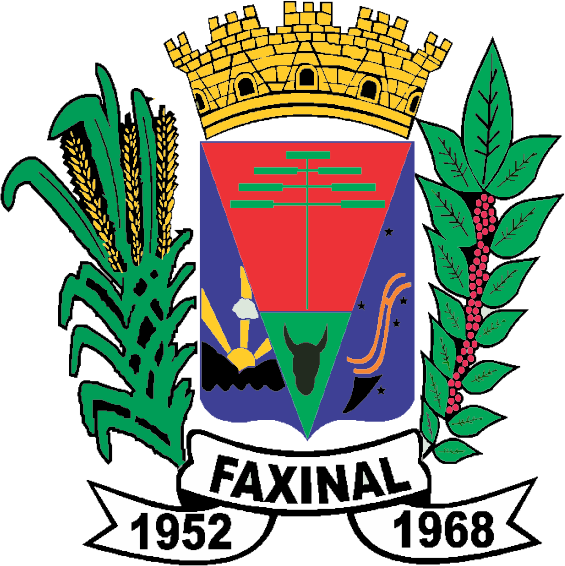
- Flag Coat of arms

- Location in Paraná

- Location in Brazil
- Coordinates: 24°00′03″S 51°19′12″W
- Country: Brazil
- Region: Southern
- State: Paraná
- Mesoregion: Norte Central Paranaense

Area
  - Total: 276.427 sq mi (715.943 km^{2})
- Elevation: 2,690 ft (820 m)

Population (2020)
  - Total: 17,316
  - Density: 62.642/sq mi (24.186/km^{2})
- Time zone: UTC−3 (BRT)

Faxinal is a municipality in the state of Paraná in the Southern Region of Brazil.

== History ==
The colonization of the Faxinal region is relatively recent, although there are historical signs of Jesuit occupation on the banks of the Ivaí River. However, it was only in the twentieth century, after the 1930s, that the concession of land by the state government to an English colonizer, led to the occupation of the territory.

A small and peaceful town, the main source of income for the population is found in agriculture and retail trade. Its economy is in full development and expansion, and with the arrival of new industries in the agricultural sector, the municipality had a substantial increase in the number of job vacancies in the market. Each day, Faxinal establishes itself as the 'Capital of Tomato' due to the growing number of greenhouses growing this the tomato, thereby improving the city's economy.

== Notable people ==
- Enderson Norgentern de Oliveira (born 1988), footballer

== See also ==
- List of municipalities in Paraná
