= Rômulo Peretta =

Brazilian footballer

Personal information
- Full name: Rômulo Henrique Peretta
- Date of birth: August 26, 1996 (age 30)
- Place of birth: Brazil
- Height: 5 ft 7 in (1.70 m)
- Position: Forward

Youth career
- –2016: AA Flamengo

Senior career*
Years	Team	Apps	(Gls)
2016	Richmond Kickers	8	(0)
- * Club domestic league appearances and goals as of 12:20, 19 October 2016 (UTC)

Rômulo Henrique Peretta (born August 26, 1996) is a Brazilian footballer. Peretta previously had played for the youth sides of AA Flamengo.

== Career ==
=== Youth ===
Peretta ascended in the youth ranks of AA Flamengo, eventually reaching the U-20 team. There, Peretta was part of the U-20 team that made it to the Copa São Paulo de Futebol Júnior 2016 national tournament in January 2016. He also led Flamengo to a semifinal finish in the U20 Campeonato Paulista (State Cup), losing to eventual champions Corinthians.

=== Professional ===
On 23 February 2016, Peretta joined the Richmond Kickers of the United States third-division United Soccer League. Peretta made his professional debut on 7 May 2016, starting and playing 45 minutes in 1–0 victory over the Wilmington Hammerheads.
