= Enderson (footballer) =

Brazilian footballer (born 1988)

Personal information
- Full name: Enderson Norgentern de Oliveira
- Date of birth: January 16, 1998 (age 28)
- Place of birth: Faxinal, PR, Brazil
- Height: 1.90 m (6 ft 3 in)
- Position: Goalkeeper

Youth career
- 2006: Figueirense

Senior career*
Years	Team	Apps	(Gls)
2007–2010	Figueirense		
2009	→ Americana (loan)		
2011	Corinthians B		
2011	→ Flamengo-SP (loan)	23	(0)
- * Club domestic league appearances and goals

Enderson Norgentern de Oliveira or simply Enderson (born January 16, 1988, in Faxinal-PR), is a Brazilian goalkeeper.
