= Jackson Eskay =

American soccer player

Personal information
- Date of birth: August 24, 1994 (age 32)
- Place of birth: Urbana, Maryland, United States
- Height: 6 ft 0 in (1.83 m)
- Position: Midfielder

Youth career
- 2002–2012: FC Frederick
- 2009–2012: Urbana Hawks

College career
Years	Team	Apps	(Gls)
2012–2015	William & Mary Tribe		

Senior career*
Years	Team	Apps	(Gls)
2016–2017	Richmond Kickers	22	(1)
- * Club domestic league appearances and goals as of October 19, 2017

Jackson Eskay is an American soccer player.

== Career ==
=== Youth and amateur ===
Eskay began playing organized travel soccer in 2002 when he joined the local club, FC Frederick. He was part of their development teams through 2013. Eskay played high school soccer from 2009 through 2012 at Urbana High School, where he was a four-year starter. Eskay finished his high school career ranked second in assists and fourth in points (two points for goals and one point for assists combined). While at Urbana, Eskay helped lead the Hawks to the Maryland 4A State Finals in 2010 and 2011. While in high school, Eskay was named to the Maryland ODP team and was named to the Maryland First-Team All-State selection in 2011 and 2012.

Upon graduating from Urbana, Eskay signed a National Letter of Intent to play college soccer for the William & Mary Tribe men's soccer program. During the 2012 NCAA Division I men's soccer season, Eskay made 18 appearances and earned 12 starts, scoring twice his freshman year. Eskay earned CAA Rookie of the Week honors. Eskay had a breakout season in his sophomore year, starting and playing in 19 matches, where he led the team with 8 goals, and had 5 assists, for 21 points. Notable games he earned points included two matches against the then-No. 1 teams in the nation, Creighton and North Carolina. Eskay finished the season earning Third-Team All-CAA honors. Due to injury in the spring season, Eskay had a rather quiet junior season, playing 18 matches with 12 starts, and only scoring one goal. His senior year, he returned to form earning a spot on the VaSID First-Team and earning all-CAA Second-Team honors. He led the Tribe in points (20) and goals (8) during the 2015 NCAA Division I men's soccer season.′

== Professional ==
On March 24, 2016, Eskay signed his first professional contract with the Richmond Kickers of the second-division United Soccer League. Eskay made his professional debut on May 18, 2016, in a U.S. Open Cup fixture against Aromas Café FC. Eskay started the match and played for 68 minutes. The following Saturday, Eskay made his USL debut playing for the final minute of a 0–0 draw against Louisville City FC, coming on for Miguel Aguilar.

== Statistics ==
As of May 25, 2016

Club	Season	League			Cup		League Cup		Other^{[A]}		Total	
Club	Season	Division	Apps	Goals	Apps	Goals	Apps	Goals	Apps	Goals	Apps	Goals
United States			League		US Open Cup		USL Playoffs		North America		Total	
Richmond Kickers	2016	USL	1	0	1	0	—		—		2	0
Total	United States		1	0	1	0	0	0	0	0	2	0
Career statistics			1	0	1	0	0	0	0	0	2	0
