= Hugh Roberts (soccer) =

American soccer player

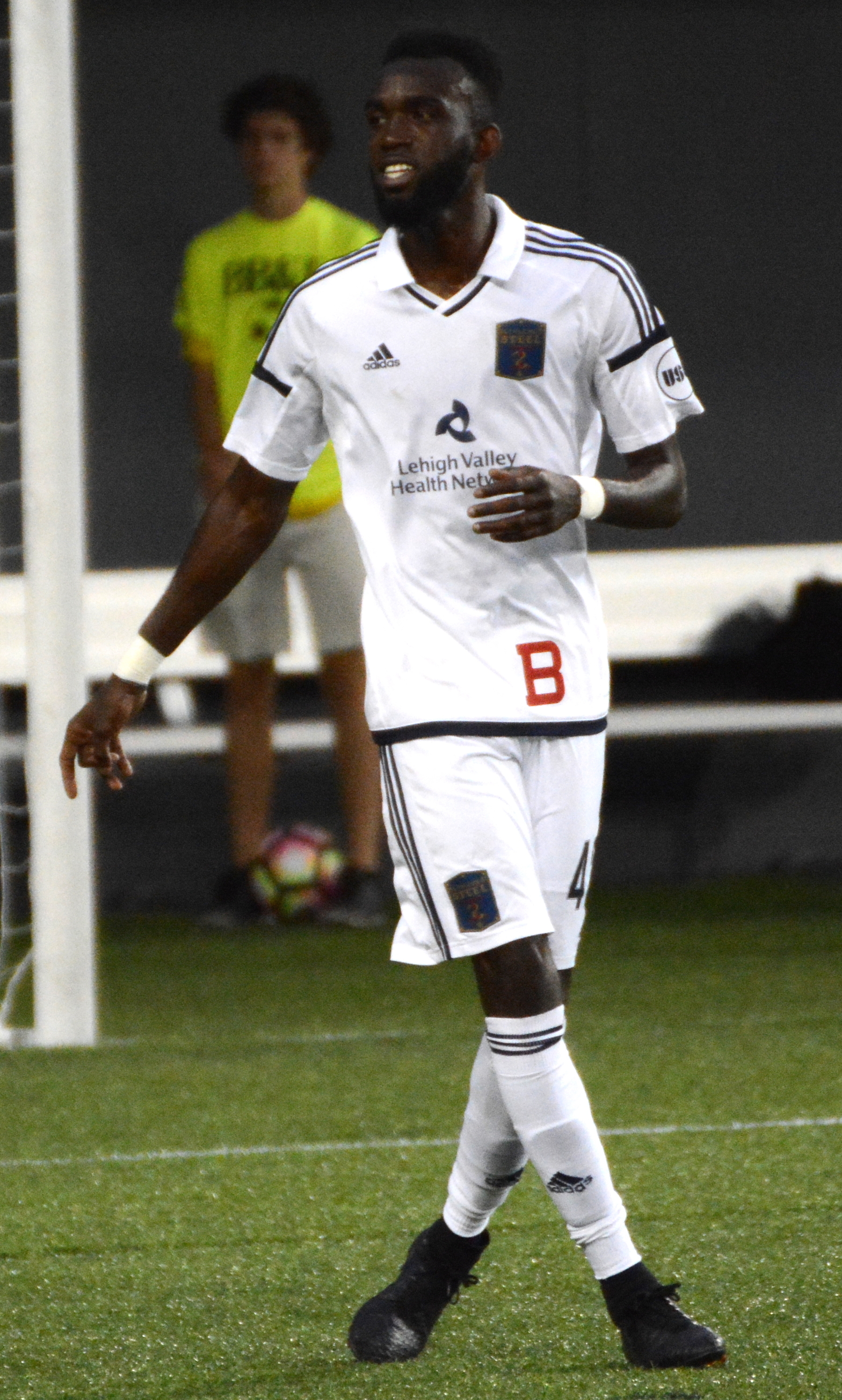
- Roberts playing for Bethlehem Steel FC in 2017

Personal information
- Date of birth: September 27, 1992 (age 34)
- Place of birth: Queens, N.Y., United States
- Height: 6 ft 4 in (1.93 m)
- Position: Defender

Team information
- Current team: Charlotte Independence
- Number: 3

College career
Years	Team	Apps	(Gls)
2010–2013	George Mason Patriots		

Senior career*
Years	Team	Apps	(Gls)
2012–2013	Baltimore Bohemians	27	(0)
2014–2016	Richmond Kickers	60	(2)
2017	Bethlehem Steel	25	(1)
2018	Pittsburgh Riverhounds	26	(1)
2019–2021	Charlotte Independence	78	(4)
2022–2023	Monterey Bay	59	(4)
2024–	Charlotte Independence	13	(0)
- * Club domestic league appearances and goals as of November 20, 2024

Hugh Roberts (born September 27, 1992) is an American soccer player who plays as a defender for USL League One club Charlotte Independence.

== Youth and college ==
=== College ===
Roberts played college soccer at George Mason University between 2010 and 2013.

While at college, Roberts played for USL PDL club Baltimore Bohemians during their 2012 and 2013 seasons.

== Club career ==
=== Richmond Kickers ===
Roberts signed with USL Pro club Richmond Kickers on March 7, 2013. After three seasons with the Kickers, Roberts became a regular starter on the backline making 79 total appearances and scoring twice. During the 2016 season, Roberts was named to the USL All-League First Team.

=== Bethlehem Steel ===
Roberts signed with USL club Bethlehem Steel FC on December 22, 2016. Roberts scored his first goal for Bethlehem in April 2017, the winner in a 1–0 home victory over FC Cincinnati.

=== Pittsburgh Riverhounds ===
After a single season with Bethlehem Steel, Roberts signed for USL's other Pennsylvania-based team, Pittsburgh Riverhounds SC on March 7, 2018.

=== Charlotte Independence ===
On January 10, 2019, Roberts joined USL Championship side Charlotte Independence.

=== Monterey Bay FC ===
Roberts signed with expansion side Monterey Bay F.C. on February 8, 2022, and was named the team's captain for their inaugural season. Roberts was included in the starting 11 for Monterey Bay's inaugural match, a 4–2 loss to Phoenix Rising FC. His first goal with the club came in the 90th minute in a match away to Oakland Roots. The goal was the game winner for the club's first ever victory in a professional competition. He left Monterey Bay following their 2023 season.

=== Charlotte Independence ===
Roberts returned to the Charlotte Independence, now in USL League One, on January 16, 2024.

== Honors ==
Individual

- USL All-League Team: 2016
