= Scott Thomsen =

American soccer player (born 1993)

Personal information
- Full name: Scott Thomsen
- Date of birth: December 31, 1993 (age 32)
- Place of birth: Brick Township, New Jersey, United States
- Height: 5 ft 10 in (1.78 m)
- Position: Defender

Youth career
- 2010–2015: New York Red Bulls

College career
Years	Team	Apps	(Gls)
2012–2015	Virginia Cavaliers	66	(3)

Senior career*
Years	Team	Apps	(Gls)
2016	New York Red Bulls	0	(0)
2016	Richmond Kickers	10	(1)
2017	Orlando City B	15	(0)
2018–2020	Richmond Kickers	55	(1)
- * Club domestic league appearances and goals as of October 25, 2020

Scott Thomsen (born December 31, 1993) is an American former professional soccer player who played for USL League One club Richmond Kickers as a defender.

== Career ==
=== Early career ===
Thomsen attended Christian Brothers Academy during high school and earned state and regional honors as a member of the soccer team. In 2010, Thomsen joined the New York Red Bulls academy, where he played primarily as a midfielder, and scored 27 goals during his five-year career.

After high school, Thomsen attended the University of Virginia and played 66 games throughout his four-year career, totaling 3 goals and 18 assists. As a freshman, he led the team in minutes with 1,991 as well as assists with eight. In 2014, he played in all 23 matches as a junior and played a crucial role in the Cavilers winning their seventh NCAA College Cup. During his senior year, Thomsen was limited to only eight games due to a sports hernia injury and was sidelined for the remainder of the season.

=== New York Red Bulls ===
On December 23, 2015, Thomsen signed a Homegrown Contract with the New York Red Bulls. After only two and a half months with the club, Thomsen was waived before the season on March 7.

=== Richmond Kickers ===
On July 22, 2016, Thomsen signed with the Richmond Kickers of the United Soccer League on a one-year contract. He made his professional debut on August 6 in a 2–1 victory against FC Montreal.

== Career statistics ==
As of June 22, 2019

Appearances and goals by club, season and competition
Club	Season	League			Playoffs (Note: Appearance in the USL Cup Playoffs)		Cup		Continental		Total	
Club	Season	Division	Apps	Goals	Apps	Goals	Apps	Goals	Apps	Goals	Apps	Goals
New York Red Bulls	2016	MLS	0	0	0	0	0	0	0	0	0	0
Richmond Kickers	2016	USL	9	1	1	0	0	0	–		10	1
Orlando City B	2017	USL	15	0	–		–		–		15	0
Richmond Kickers	2018	USL	17	1	–		1	0	–		18	1
Richmond Kickers	2019	USL League One	22	0	0	0	2	0	–		24	0
Richmond Kickers	Total		28	1	0	0	3	0	0	0	31	1
Career total			51	2	1	0	3	0	0	0	55	2
