= Patrick McCann =

American soccer player (born 1990)

Paddy McCann
Personal information
- Full name: Patrick McCann
- Date of birth: October 6, 1990 (age 36)
- Place of birth: Rockville Centre, New York, United States
- Height: 6 ft 0 in (1.83 m)
- Position: Midfielder

College career
Years	Team	Apps	(Gls)
2009–2012	Holy Cross Crusaders	64	(2)

Senior career*
Years	Team	Apps	(Gls)
2012	Brooklyn Knights	6	(0)
2013–2014	Finn Harps	33	(6)
2015	Brenes Balompié		
2016	Sligo Rovers	10	(1)
2017	Richmond Kickers	10	(0)
- * Club domestic league appearances and goals as of October 19, 2017

Patrick McCann (born October 6, 1990) is an American soccer player who plays as a midfielder.

== Career ==
McCann played four years of college soccer at College of the Holy Cross between 2009 and 2012. While at college, McCann also appeared for USL PDL side Brooklyn Knights in 2012 and trained with Irish clubs Dundalk, Shamrock Rovers and Sligo Rovers.

In 2013, McCann joined Irish side Finn Harps. Following this spell, McCann had a brief stint in Spain with Brenes Balompié, before trialling with United Soccer League side New York Red Bulls II. He returned to Ireland with Sligo Rovers in 2016.

MCann signed with USL side Richmond Kickers on February 14, 2017.

== Personal life ==
McCann's grandmother and grandfather are from the Irish counties Donegal and Tyrone, respectively.
