= Travis Pittman =

American soccer player (born 1991)

Personal information
- Date of birth: March 22, 1991 (age 35)
- Place of birth: Manassas, Virginia, United States
- Height: 6 ft 0 in (1.83 m)
- Position: Midfielder

Team information
- Current team: San Diego Sockers
- Number: 18

Youth career
- 2005–2009: Northern Virginia Royals
- 2008–2009: D.C. United

College career
Years	Team	Apps	(Gls)
2009–2012	West Virginia Mountaineers	75	(4)

Senior career*
Years	Team	Apps	(Gls)
2011–2012	Northern Virginia Royals	0	(0)
2013–2015	Wichita B52s (indoor)	31	(27)
2015	New York Cosmos B		
2015–2016	Missouri Comets (indoor)	3	(0)
2016	Richmond Kickers	9	(0)
2016–2017	Baltimore Blast (indoor)	13	(1)
2017	FC Wichita	2	(0)
2018	New York Cosmos B	5	(0)
2018–	San Diego Sockers (indoor)	41	(15)
- * Club domestic league appearances and goals as of 18 April 2021

Travis Pittman (born March 22, 1991) is an American soccer player who currently plays for the San Diego Sockers of the Major Arena Soccer League.

== Youth and college ==
Travis Pittman was born and raised in Manassas, Virginia, a Northern Virginia suburb of Washington, D.C. In high school, Pittman was a three-year starter for Osbourn High School where he earned the honor of being a high school boys’ first team All-American. Outside of high school soccer, Pittman played for the Northern Virginia Royals youth teams as well as the D.C. United Academy. Pittman also participated in the United States U-14, U-16, and U-18 levels.

In 2009, Pittman signed a letter of intent to play for the West Virginia Mountaineers men's soccer program. There, he was a four-year starter.

== Professional career ==
Pittman began his professional career playing indoor soccer, initially with the Wichita B52s of the Professional Arena Soccer League. In the 2013–14 PASL season, Pittman made 20 appearances scoring 15 goals for the B52s. In Pittman's second season with the B52s, he scored 12 goals off 11 appearances.

Between the 2014–15 and the 2015–16 MASL seasons, Pittman played outdoor soccer in the summer, in the fourth-division National Premier Soccer League. Initially signing for FC Wichita, Pittman ended up never playing with the club and instead playing for the New York Cosmos B (also of NPSL). At the end of the 2015 NPSL season, Pittman returned to indoor soccer and played three matches with the Missouri Comets.

At the end of the 2015–16 MASL season, Pittman went on trial with the Richmond Kickers of the third-division outdoor United Soccer League, ultimately earning a contract with the Kickers. Pittman made his outdoor professional debut on April 9, 2016, starting and playing for 81 minutes in 1–0 home victory against the Rochester Rhinos.
