= Jonathan Atkinson =

English footballer (born 1972)

Personal information
- Full name: Jonathan David Atkinson
- Date of birth: 18 September 1972 (age 54)
- Place of birth: Ashington, England
- Position: Midfielder

Senior career*
Years	Team	Apps	(Gls)
1996–1997	Morpeth Town		
1997	Darlington	5	(0)
- * Club domestic league appearances and goals

Log in

Jonathan David Atkinson (born 18 September 1972) is an English footballer who played as a midfielder for Darlington in The Football League.
