= Anthony Grant (footballer, born 1989) =

Jamaican footballer

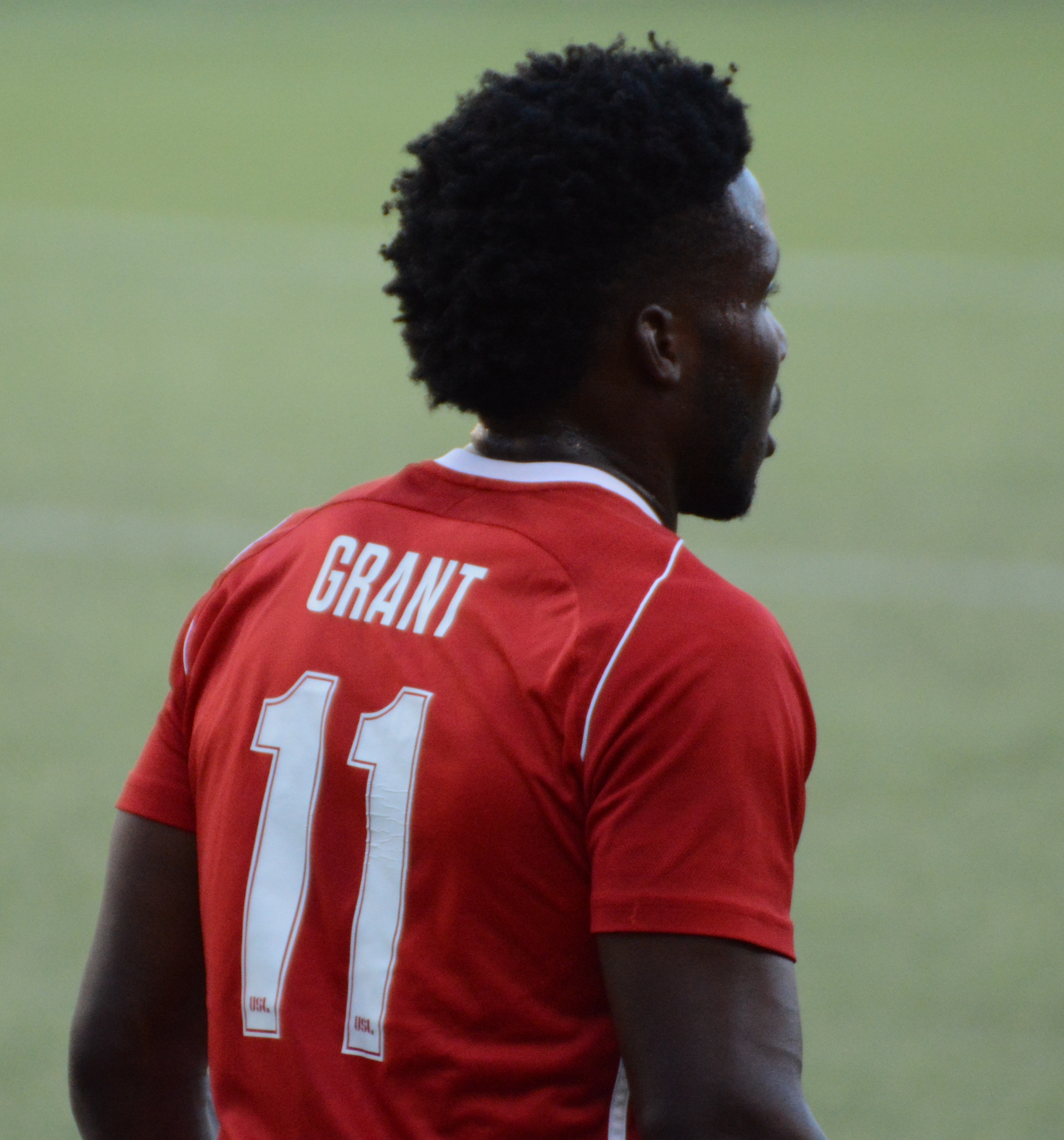
- Grant playing for Richmond Kickers in 2017

Personal information
- Date of birth: 4 August 1989 (age 37)
- Place of birth: Kingston, Jamaica
- Height: 5 ft 9 in (1.75 m)
- Position: Forward

College career
Years	Team	Apps	(Gls)
2010–2011	McKendree Bearcats	18	(23)
2012–2013	Bowling Green Falcons	39	(12)

Senior career*
Years	Team	Apps	(Gls)
2012	Michigan Bucks	13	(7)
2014–2015	Seacoast United Phantoms	22	(26)
2014–2015	Syracuse Silver Knights (indoor)	14	(12)
2015–2017	Richmond Kickers	45	(3)
2015–2016	→ UWI (loan)		(3)
2017–2019	Kansas City Comets (indoor)	35	(34)
2019	Stumptown Athletic	2	(0)
2020	St. Louis Ambush (indoor)	6	(5)

International career
2012–2013	Jamaica U23		
- * Club domestic league appearances and goals as of 22 January 2022

Anthony Grant (born 4 August 1989 in Kingston, Jamaica) is a Jamaican footballer who currently plays for the St. Louis Ambush in the Major Arena Soccer League.

== Career ==
=== Youth and amateur ===
Grant played two years of college soccer at McKendree University in 2010 and 2011, before transferring to Bowling Green University for 2012 and 2013.

Following his final season at Bowling Green, Grant played indoor soccer with Syracuse Silver Knights in 2013, and played two seasons with USL PDL side Seacoast United Phantoms.

=== Professional ===
Grant signed with United Soccer League side Richmond Kickers on 20 August 2015.

Grant signed with the Silver Knights in October 2015.

Grant currently plays for the Kansas City Comets (MASL), 2018.
