= Braeden Troyer =

American soccer player

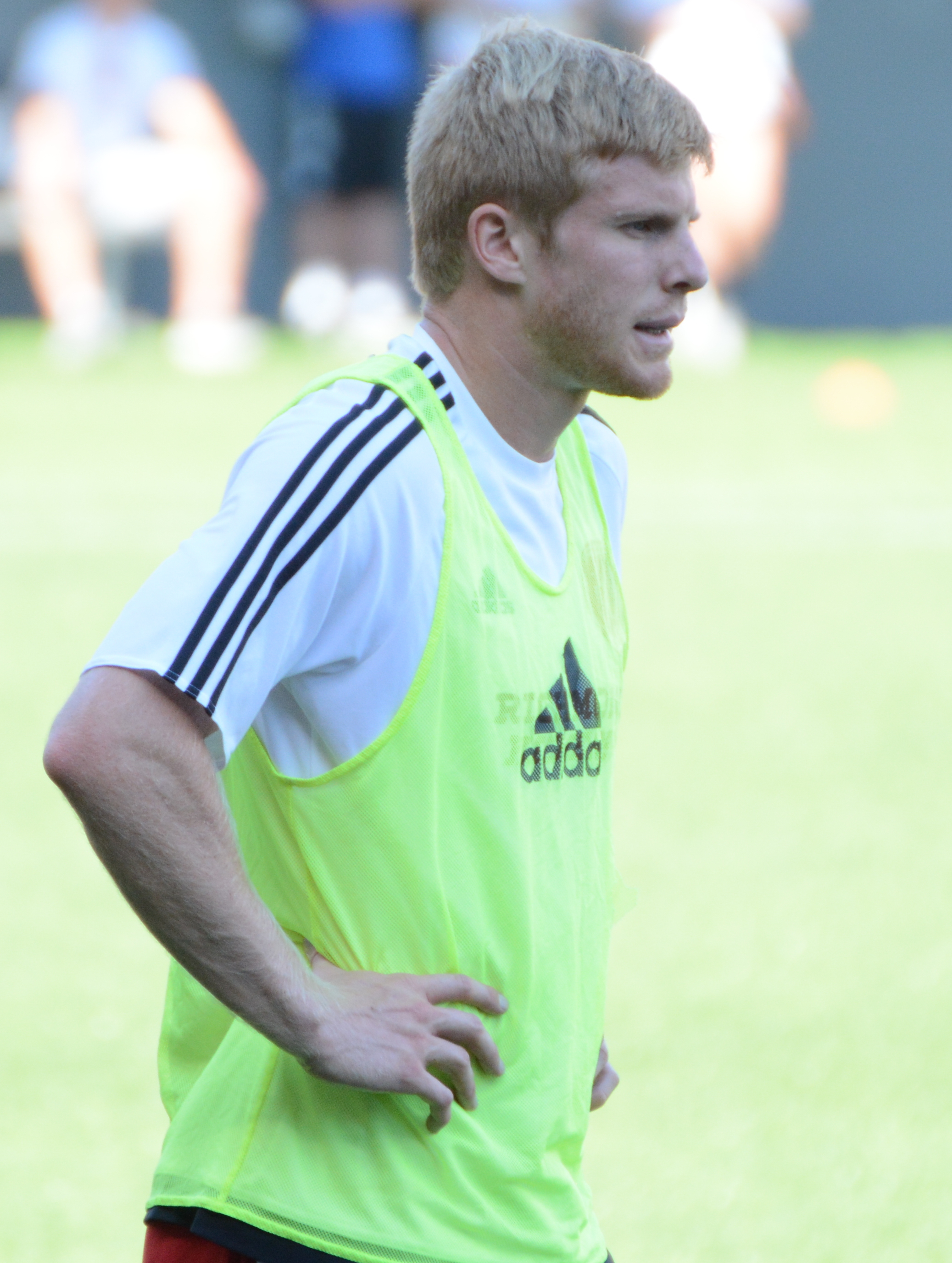
- Troyer with Richmond Kickers in 2017

Personal information
- Date of birth: March 19, 1993 (age 33)
- Place of birth: Columbia, South Carolina, United States
- Height: 5 ft 11 in (1.80 m)
- Position: Defender

Youth career
- 2005–2008: South Carolina United
- 2009–2011: Charleston Battery

College career
Years	Team	Apps	(Gls)
2011–2014	South Carolina Gamecocks	76	(10)

Senior career*
Years	Team	Apps	(Gls)
2012–2014	SC United Bantams	31	(3)
2015–2019	Richmond Kickers	133	(1)
Total		164	(4)
- * Club domestic league appearances and goals as of October 21, 2019

Braeden Troyer (born March 19, 1993) is a former American professional soccer player who played for USL League One club Richmond Kickers as a defender.

== Club career ==
=== College ===
Troyer played four years of college soccer at the University of South Carolina between 2011 and 2014.

=== Professional ===
Troyer signed with United Soccer League club Richmond Kickers on March 24, 2015.
