= Yomby William =

Cameroonian footballer

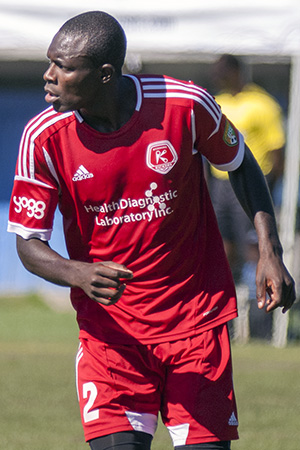

Personal information
- Full name: Yomby Lowe Richard William
- Date of birth: June 18, 1981 (age 45)
- Place of birth: Bafoussam, Cameroon
- Height: 6 ft 4 in (1.93 m)
- Position: Defender

Youth career
- FootStar

College career
Years	Team	Apps	(Gls)
2005–2007	Old Dominion Monarchs		

Senior career*
Years	Team	Apps	(Gls)
2006	Virginia Beach Submariners	12	(1)
2007	Hampton Roads Piranhas	14	(0)
2008	Kansas City Wizards	0	(0)
2008	Puerto Rico Islanders	14	(0)
2009–2018	Richmond Kickers	216	(9)

Managerial career
- 2009–2018: Richmond Kickers youth
- 2018–: Old Dominion Monarchs (asst.)
- * Club domestic league appearances and goals as of May 11, 2020

Richard Lowe Yomby William (born June 18, 1981 in Bafoussam) is a retired Cameroonian footballer who spent the majority of his career with the Richmond Kickers. He is currently an assistant coach at University of Evansville for their men's soccer program.

== Career ==
=== Youth and college ===
William attended high school at Lycee Classique Bafoussam in Cameroon, played club soccer for FootStar, and attended the University of Oschang, before moving to the United States in 2005 to attend and play college soccer at Old Dominion University. In his career at Old Dominion, William scored one goal and one assist, with 10 total shots.

During his college years, William also played in the USL Premier Development League with the Hampton Roads Piranhas.

=== Professional ===
William was drafted with the 23rd overall pick in the 2008 MLS SuperDraft by Kansas City Wizards and signed a developmental contract before transferring to Puerto Rico Islanders of the USL First Division later that year.

In 2009 Yomby signed for the Richmond Kickers of the USL Second Division. He was named to the USL Second Division All-League First Team and won the defender of the year title. His Kickers team won the 2009 USL Second Division championship.

Yomby remained with Richmond for the 2010 and 2011 seasons and was defender of the year finalist and first team all league both seasons. The club signed him to a contract for the 2012 season on September 1, 2011.

== Honors ==
=== Richmond Kickers ===
- USL all team 2009/ Defender of the year
- USL all team 2010/ Defender of the year finalist
- USL all team 2011/ Defender of the year finalist
- USL all team 2012/ Defender of the year finalist
- USL all team 2013/ Defender of the year finalist
- USL all team 2014/ Defender of the year finalist.
- USL Second Division Champions (1): 2009
