= Sunny Jane =

Mosotho footballer (born 1991)

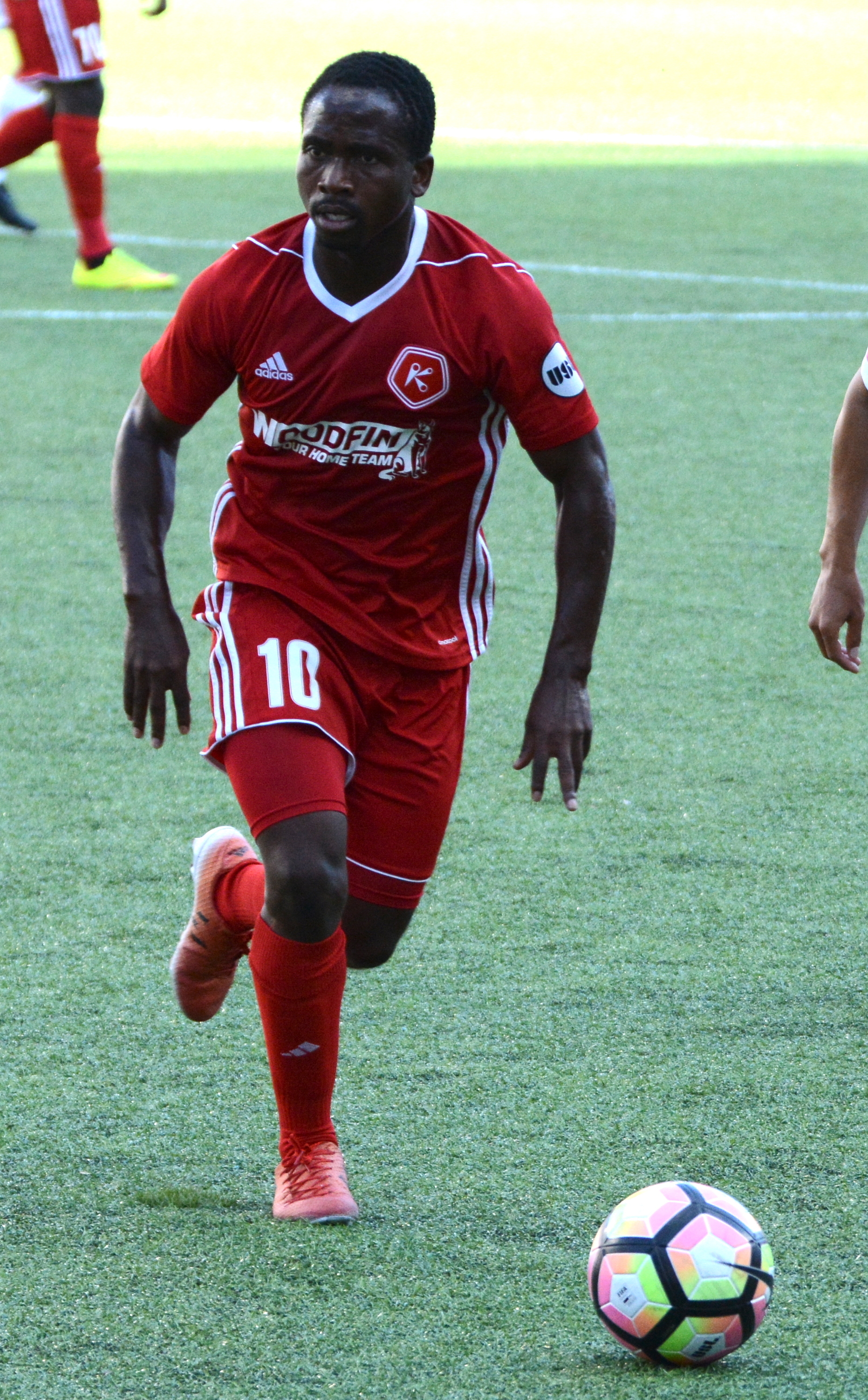
- Jane with Richmond Kickers in 2017

Personal information
- Full name: Tsotleho Paul Jane
- Date of birth: 17 July 1991 (age 35)
- Place of birth: Maseru, Lesotho
- Height: 5 ft 6 in (1.68 m)
- Position: Forward

Youth career
- 1995–1998: Ranger FC
- 1998–2003: Emmanuel FC
- 2013: United 1996 FC

College career
Years	Team	Apps	(Gls)
2010–2013	Maryland Terrapins	89	(8)

Senior career*
Years	Team	Apps	(Gls)
2014–2015	Wilmington Hammerheads	42	(9)
2016–2017	Richmond Kickers	49	(8)
2018–2019	Phnom Penh Crown	7	(4)
2019–2020	Louisville City	11	(1)
2020–2022	Bantu		
2022–2023	East Riffa		

International career^{‡}
2014–	Lesotho	18	(1)
- * Club domestic league appearances and goals as of 7 November 2023 ‡ National team caps and goals as of 16 July 2026

Tsotleho "Sunny" Jane is a Mosotho footballer who currently plays as a forward.

== Early life ==
Jane was born in Lesotho and began playing soccer at age 4 watching his brother Jane Jane, a member of the Lesotho national football team. He moved to the United States with a host family in Kentucky to pursue a professional soccer career at age 13 after making contact with Thabane Sutu, a former goalkeeper for the Lesotho national team, who was coaching at United 1996 in Louisville.

== Career ==
=== Youth ===
While living in Kentucky, Jane played for United 1996 FC in Louisville while earning All-State honors at Trinity High School.

=== College and amateur ===
From 2010 to 2013, Jane played college soccer for the Terrapins of the University of Maryland. His performance in the offense at Maryland, including appearances in every match during the 2012 and 2013 seasons and eight goals and 19 assists in four seasons, led to him being named the No. 10-rated recruit in the nation. At the time, it was strongly believed that Jane was one of only two Lesotho-born players to be playing college soccer in the United States, the other being Lepe Seetane who played for the Northwestern Wildcats and came to the United States and lived with the same host family as Jane.

It was announced on 26 January 2011 that Jane was signed as one of the first 15 players to join the River City Rovers of the Premier Development League for their inaugural season in 2011. However, Jane never appeared on the roster for the season and did not make any appearances for the club.

=== Professional ===
==== United States ====
Following the 2013 season at Maryland, Jane was invited to participate in the MLS Combine in hopes of impressing Major League Soccer scouts and being selected in the 2014 MLS SuperDraft. However, he was not selected during the draft. After not being selected by an MLS club, it was announced on 24 February 2014 that Jane had signed a professional contract with Wilmington Hammerheads FC of the USL Pro, the third level of the United States soccer pyramid, for the 2014 season. After missing the Hammerheads' first two games of the season due to a lengthy international clearance process, Jane made his professional debut on 26 April 2014 in a league match against the Charlotte Eagles. Jane entered the match in the 60th minute with Wilmington trailing 0–2. Although he did not score, Jane set up several chances and narrowly missed one of his own. About Jane's debut, head coach David Irving said, “I thought Sunny Jane did well when he came on...I thought he gave us a little breath of fresh air...” In May 2014 Jane scored a hat trick against the United States Under-20 national team when it played the Hammerheads as part of a training camp in North Carolina to prepare for 2015 FIFA U-20 World Cup qualification.

Jane scored his first professional goal on 23 August 2014 in an eventual 2–1 victory over the Orange County Blues FC. Only one day after scoring his first professional goal, Jane scored two more for his first brace in a 3–3 draw with LA Galaxy II. In total, Jane scored five goals and tallied three assists in 17 appearances during his first professional season, one that included a late-season playoff push. On 24 November 2014, it was announced that Jane, along with teammate Paul Nicholson, would return to Wilmington for the 2015 USL Pro season to fulfill the second year of their two-year contracts. About Jane returning to the team, new head coach Carson Porter said, “What is exciting for us is that I don’t think we have seen the best of Sunny and we look forward to working with him and helping him reach his potential as a player. We knew coming into the offseason we wanted to have Sunny back and are excited about his future.”

Jane moved to USL side Richmond Kickers on January 7, 2016. He remained with the club through the 2017 season, scoring seven total league goals in 49 appearances.

==== Cambodia ====
On 8 February 2018 it was announced that Jane had signed for Phnom Penh Crown of the Cambodian League. His first goal for the club came in his second appearance, when he scored a long-ranged screamer to the top corner in the 90+minute to seal off an impressive 2 : 0 away win over National Defense Ministry FC.

==== Return to the United States ====
On 10 December 2018, it was announced Jane would join USL Championship side Louisville City ahead of their 2019 season.

==== Return to Lesotho ====
In November 2020 it was announced that Jane had signed for Bantu FC in the Premier League in his native Lesotho.

== International career ==
Jane represented his native Lesotho at the Under-15/16 and Under-18 levels. He trained with the U-18 team at age 13. He had also been called up to play for the U-20 and senior national team. However, Jane stated that he was waiting to make a decision on the future of his international career until after gaining United States citizenship and attempting to earn a call-up to the United States national team. In June 2014, Jane chose to represent his native Lesotho, making his international debut in a 2–0 victory over Liberia during 2015 Africa Cup of Nations qualification. Jane started the match and played 60 minutes in the victory which saw Lesotho advanced to the second round of qualifying for the first time in history. About playing for Lesotho, Jane said, “It’s a good feeling...It’s really special. It’ll be a chance to see my family, so I’m excited about it.” His return to Lesotho for the match allowed him to see his family and friends for the first time in ten years since going to the United States. In July and August 2014, Jane was called up again for home-and-away qualifiers against Kenya. Jane went on to play in the first leg of the series, earning a start in the eventual 1–0 victory.

In May 2015, Jane was called up to the Lesotho squad again to take part in the 2015 COSAFA Cup. Jane started Lesotho's opening match against Madagascar before being subbed off in the second half of the eventual 1–2 defeat.

== Career statistics ==
=== Club ===
As of 19 December 2018

Club	League	Season	League	
Club	League	Season	Apps	Goals
Wilmington Hammerheads	USL Pro	2014	17	5
Wilmington Hammerheads	USL	2015	25	2
Richmond Kickers	USL	2016	25	4
Richmond Kickers	USL	2017	24	3
Phnom Penh Crown FC	Cambodian League	2018	7	2
Louisville City FC	USL Championship	2019	0	0
Career total			98	16

=== International ===
As of match played 13 October 2025

Lesotho national team
Year	Apps	Goals
2014	2	0
2015	2	0
2016	3	1
2017	–	
2018	6	0
2019	–	
2020	2	0
2021	1	0
2022	–	
2023	–	
2024	–	
2025	2	0
Total	18	1

Scores and results list Lesotho's goal tally first, score column indicates score after each Jane goal.

List of international goals scored by Sunny Jane
No.	Date	Venue	Opponent	Score	Result	Competition
1	29 March 2016	Setsoto Stadium, Maseru, Lesotho	Seychelles	1–0	2–1	2017 Africa Cup of Nations qualification
