= Charlottesville Alliance FC =

Soccer club in Virginia, United States

- Full name: Charlottesville Alliance FC
- Nickname: C-Ville Alliance FC
- Founded: 2016
- Stadium: Charlottesville High School
- Head Coach: Jonathan Atkinson
- League: NPSL
- Website: https://cvillealliancefc.org/
Home colours	Away colours

Charlottesville Alliance FC, formerly Aromas Café FC, is an American amateur soccer club based in Charlottesville, Virginia. In 2016, the club reached the second round of the Lamar Hunt U.S. Open Cup.

Beginning with the 2018 season, Charlottesville Alliance F.C. play in the Northeast Region Mid-Atlantic Conference of the National Premier Soccer League.

== Colors and badge ==
Charlottesville Alliance FC logo evolution
2016–2017

2018–
