= Fred Sekyere =

Ghanaian footballer

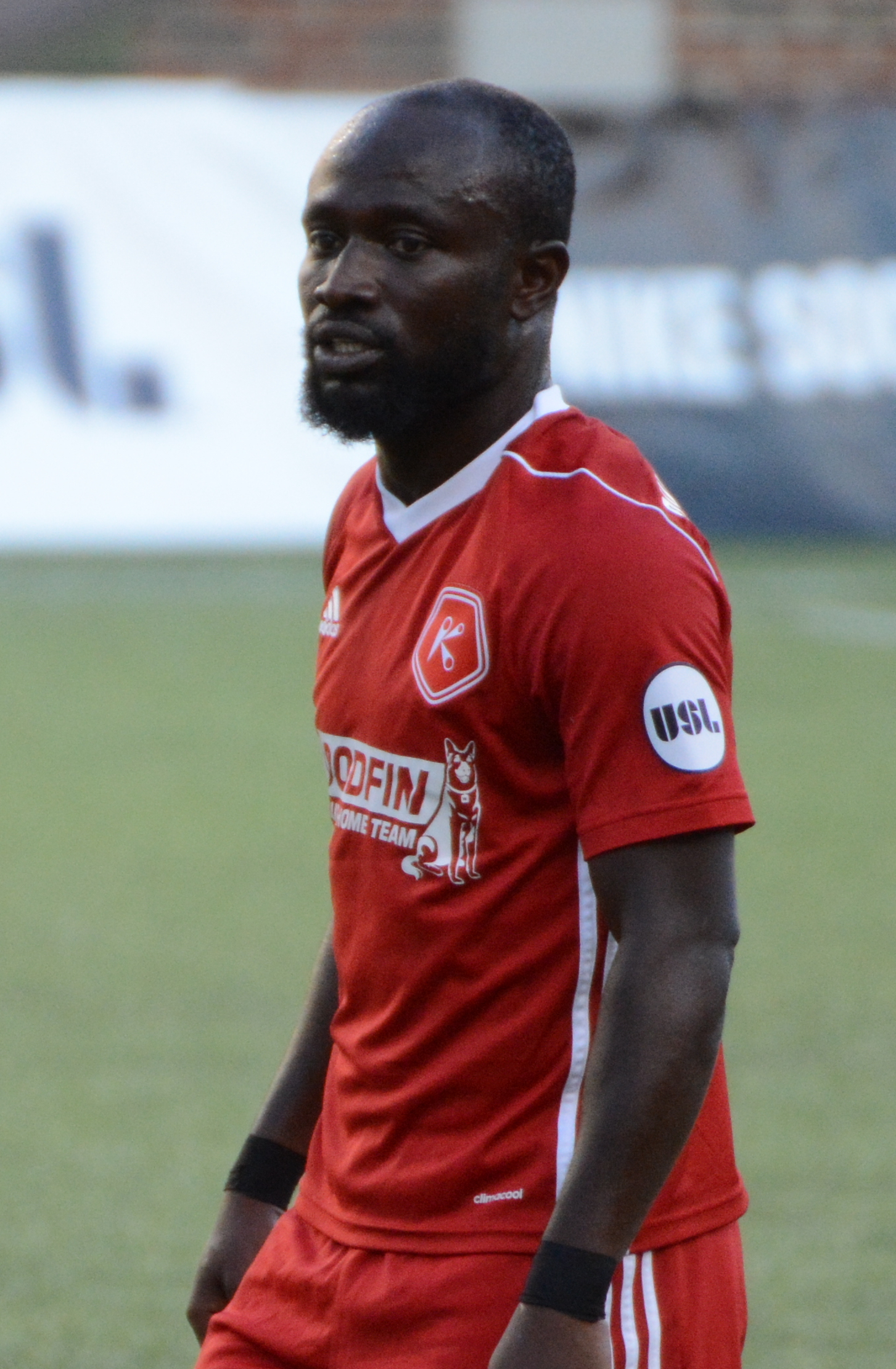
- Sekyere playing for Richmond Kickers in 2017

Personal information
- Full name: Fred Owusu Sekyere
- Date of birth: 31 March 1986 (age 40)
- Place of birth: Kumasi, Ghana
- Height: 1.59 m (5 ft 3 in)
- Position: Midfielder

College career
Years	Team	Apps	(Gls)
2006–2009	VCU Rams		

Senior career*
Years	Team	Apps	(Gls)
2013	RVA FC		
2014	Charlotte Eagles	28	(2)
2015–2018	Richmond Kickers	88	(4)
Total		116	(6)
- * Club domestic league appearances and goals

Fred Owusu Sekyere (born March 31, 1986) is a Ghanaian former professional footballer who played as a midfielder. He currently serves as Director of Technical Training and Camps at the Richmond Kickers Youth Club.

== Career ==
=== College and amateur ===
Sekyere played four years of college soccer at Virginia Commonwealth University between 2006 and 2009.

=== Professional career ===
Sekyere played with NPSL club RVA FC in 2013 before signing with USL Pro club Charlotte Eagles in March 2014.

Sekyere signed with Richmond Kickers on 19 January 2015.

On 1 December 2018, he announced his retirement from professional football.
