= Samuel Asante =

Ghanaian footballer (born 1989)

Personal information
- Date of birth: 13 August 1989 (age 37)
- Place of birth: Sunyani, Ghana
- Height: 1.63 m (5 ft 4 in)
- Position: Midfielder

Youth career
- 2009–2012: Lindsey Wilson Blue Raiders

Senior career*
Years	Team	Apps	(Gls)
2009	Des Moines Menace	10	(2)
2010	Rochester Thunder	13	(0)
2013	Charlotte Eagles	21	(0)
2014–2017	Richmond Kickers	91	(3)
- * Club domestic league appearances and goals as of 19 October 2017

Samuel Asante (born 13 August 1989) is a Ghanaian footballer who plays as a midfielder.

== Career ==
=== College and amateur ===
Asante played four years of college soccer at the Lindsey Wilson College.

During his time at college, Okai also played for USL PDL clubs Des Moines Menace in 2009, and Rochester Thunder in 2010.

=== Professional career ===
Asante signed with USL Pro club Charlotte Eagles in April 2013.
