= Bensley, Virginia =

- CDP
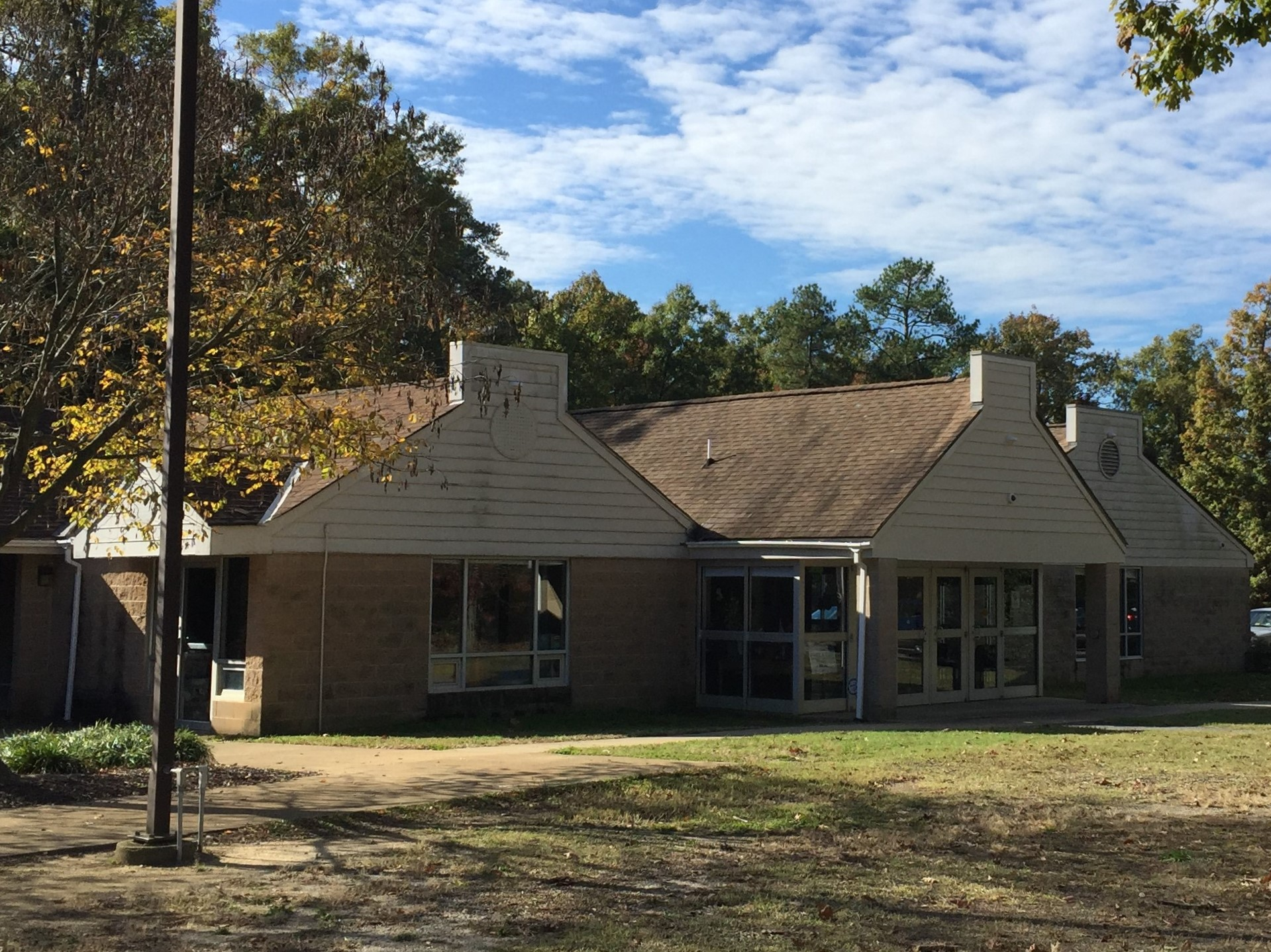
- Bensley community building

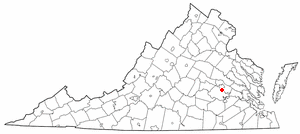
- Location of Bensley, Virginia
- Coordinates: 37°26′56″N 77°26′44″W
- Country: United States
- State: Virginia
- County: Chesterfield

Area
  - Total: 2.9 sq mi (7.5 km^{2})
  - Land: 2.9 sq mi (7.4 km^{2})
  - Water: 0.039 sq mi (0.1 km^{2})
- Elevation: 56 ft (17 m)

Population (2020)
  - Total: 5,971
  - Density: 2,100/sq mi (810/km^{2})
- Time zone: UTC−5 (Eastern (EST))
  - Summer (DST): UTC−4 (EDT)
- FIPS code: 51-06728
- GNIS feature ID: 1867584

Bensley is a census-designated place (CDP) in Chesterfield County, Virginia, United States. It is an inner suburb of Richmond. The population was 5,971 at the 2020 census. Bensley Community building is inside of Bensley park. The community building is outside of Bensley, setting in walking distance of the CDP. The community is an old village with no active government. The community is over 100 years old. A new police substation in the village is next to the old Bensley Bermuda Rescue Squad, near DuPont Spruance.

== Geography ==
Bensley is located at 37°26′56″N 77°26′44″W (37.448897, -77.445605).

According to the United States Census Bureau, the CDP has a total area of 2.9 square miles (7.5 km^{2}), of which 2.9 square miles (7.4 km^{2}) is land and 0.02 square miles (0.06 km^{2}), or 0.81%, is water.

== Demographics ==
Historical population
Census	Pop.	Note	%±
2000	5,453		—
2010	5,819		6.7%
2020	5,971		2.6%

=== Racial and ethnic composition ===
Bensley CDP, Virginia – Racial and ethnic composition Note: the US Census treats Hispanic/Latino as an ethnic category. This table excludes Latinos from the racial categories and assigns them to a separate category. Hispanics/Latinos may be of any race.
Race / Ethnicity (NH = Non-Hispanic)	Pop 2000	Pop 2010	Pop 2020	% 2000	% 2010	% 2020
White alone (NH)	3,051	2,104	1,670	56.14%	36.16%	27.97%
Black or African American alone (NH)	1,296	1,371	1,358	23.85%	23.56%	22.74%
Native American or Alaska Native alone (NH)	28	36	29	0.52%	0.62%	0.49%
Asian alone (NH)	239	109	80	4.40%	1.87%	1.34%
Native Hawaiian or Pacific Islander alone (NH)	1	1	1	0.02%	0.02%	0.02%
Other race alone (NH)	15	16	30	0.28%	0.27%	0.50%
Mixed race or Multiracial (NH)	116	102	142	2.13%	1.75%	2.38%
Hispanic or Latino (any race)	689	2,080	2,661	12.68%	35.74%	44.57%
Total	5,435	5,819	5,971	100.00%	100.00%	100.00%

=== 2000 census ===
As of the census of 2000, there were 5,435 people, 2,252 households, and 1,407 families residing in the CDP. The population density was 1,882.8 people per square mile (726.1/km^{2}). There were 2,368 housing units at an average density of 820.3/sq mi (316.4/km^{2}). The racial makeup of the CDP was 62.34% White, 24.32% African American, 0.64% Native American, 4.40% Asian, 0.11% Pacific Islander, 5.04% from other races, and 3.15% from two or more races. Hispanic or Latino of any race were 12.68% of the population.

There were 2,252 households, out of which 32.3% had children under the age of 18 living with them, 37.3% were married couples living together, 18.3% had a female householder with no husband present, and 37.5% were non-families. 30.1% of all households were made up of individuals, and 6.9% had someone living alone who was 65 years of age or older. The average household size was 2.41 and the average family size was 2.97.

In the CDP, the population was spread out, with 25.5% under the age of 18, 11.0% from 18 to 24, 32.5% from 25 to 44, 21.8% from 45 to 64, and 9.2% who were 65 years of age or older. The median age was 33 years. For every 100 females, there were 98.9 males. For every 100 females age 18 and over, there were 97.8 males.

The median income for a household in the CDP was $30,523, and the median income for a family was $35,344. Males had a median income of $28,333 versus $21,968 for females. The per capita income for the CDP was $14,896. About 13.6% of families and 14.6% of the population were below the poverty line, including 20.5% of those under age 18 and 5.7% of those age 65 or over.
