= Yudai Imura =

Japanese footballer

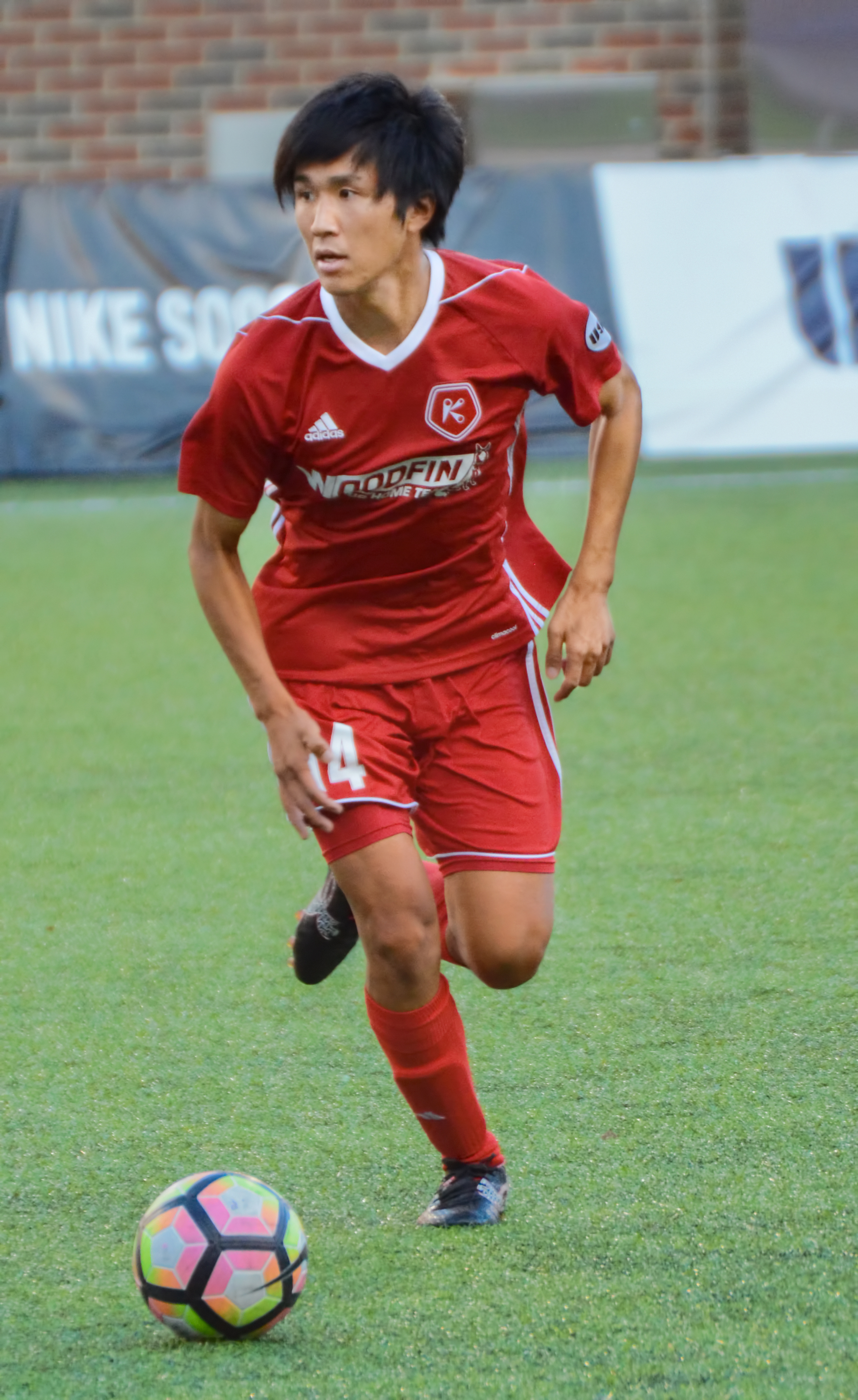
- Imura playing for Richmond Kickers in 2017

Personal information
- Date of birth: June 25, 1991 (age 35)
- Place of birth: Musashino, Japan
- Height: 1.76 m (5 ft 9 in)
- Position: Midfielder

Team information
- Current team: Pattani

Youth career
- 2009: Yokogawa Musashino
- 2010–2013: Juntendo University

Senior career*
Years	Team	Apps	(Gls)
2014	Yokogawa Musashino	9	(4)
2015–2018	Richmond Kickers	96	(15)
- * Club domestic league appearances and goals as of 15 October 2018

Yudai Imura (井村雄大, Imura Yūdai; born June 25, 1991) is a Japanese footballer who plays as a midfielder.

== Career ==
=== Professional ===
Imura signed with Richmond Kickers in March 2015 through the club's open tryout.

== Honors ==
Individual

- USL All-League Second Team: 2016
