= Associação Atlética Flamengo =

Association football club in Brazil

Flamengo de Guarulhos
- Full name: Associação Atlética Flamengo
- Nicknames: Flamenguinho; Rubro-Negro; Corvo; O Campeão da Cidade
- Founded: 1 June 1954; 71 years ago
- Ground: Antônio Soares de Oliveira
- Capacity: 15,000
- President: Joaquim Mangueira
- Head Coach: Rogério Delgado
- League: Campeonato Paulista Segunda Divisão
- 2025: Paulista Segunda Divisão, 12th of 15
- Website: www.aaflamengo.com
Home colours	Away colours

Associação Atlética Flamengo, commonly referred to as Flamengo de Guarulhos, is a Brazilian professional football club based in Guarulhos, São Paulo. The team competes in the Paulista Segunda Divisão, the fourth tier of the São Paulo state football league.

The club was founded on June 1, 1954.

== History ==
The club won the Campeonato Paulista Segunda Divisão B2 in 1999, the Campeonato Paulista Série B in 2000, and the Campeonato Paulista Série A3 in 2008.

== Honours ==
- Campeonato Paulista Série A3
  - Winners (1): 2008
- Campeonato Paulista Série A4
  - Winners (1): 2000
- Campeonato Paulista Segunda Divisão
  - Winners (1): 1999

== Stadium ==
Associação Atlética Flamengo play their home games at Estádio Antônio Oliveira. The stadium has a maximum capacity of 15,000 people.
