= 2019 USL League One season =

USL League One
- Season: 2019
- Dates: March 29 – October 5
- Champions: North Texas SC (1st Title)
- Regular season title: North Texas SC (1st Title)
- Matches: 140
- Goals: 361 (2.58 per match)
- Best player: (Mexico) Arturo Rodriguez North Texas SC
- Top goalscorer: (Haiti) Ronaldo Damus (North Texas SC) (16 Goals)
- Best goalkeeper: (Guam) Dallas Jaye Greenville Triumph SC
- Biggest home win: TUC 4–0 CHT (May 18); NTX 4–0 RIC (September 10); GVL 4–0 TUC (September 13)
- Biggest away win: TUC 0–5 LAN (September 6)
- Highest scoring: LAN 4–3 CHT (September 14)
- Longest winning run: 6 games Lansing Ignite FC (July 31 – October 12)
- Longest unbeaten run: 12 games Lansing Ignite FC (July 6 – October 12)
- Longest winless run: 15 games Orlando City B (June 12 – September 21)
- Longest losing run: 10 games Orlando City B (July 12 – September 21)
- Highest attendance: 5,936; RIC 2–3 LAN (March 30)
- Lowest attendance: 51; TOR 1–0 TRM (September 27)
- All statistics correct as of October 5, 2019.

The 2019 USL League One season was the inaugural season of USL League One. The regular season consisted of a 28–game schedule that began on March 29 and concluded on October 5. The playoffs began on October 12 with the final match of the postseason on October 19.

== Teams ==
Locations of teams for the 2019 USL League One season

Club	City	Stadium	Capacity	Head coach	Affiliate
USL League One
Chattanooga Red Wolves SC	Chattanooga, Tennessee	David Stanton Field	5,000	Tim Hankinson	
Forward Madison FC	Madison, Wisconsin	Breese Stevens Field	5,000	Daryl Shore	Minnesota United FC
Greenville Triumph SC	Greenville, South Carolina	Legacy Early College Field	4,000	John Harkes	
Lansing Ignite FC	Lansing, Michigan	Cooley Law School Stadium	7,527	Nate Miller	Chicago Fire
North Texas SC	Frisco, Texas	Toyota Stadium	20,500	Eric Quill	FC Dallas
Orlando City B	Montverde, Florida	Montverde Academy	3,500	Roberto Sibaja (Interim)	Orlando City SC
Richmond Kickers	Richmond, Virginia	City Stadium	22,611	David Bulow	
South Georgia Tormenta FC	Statesboro, Georgia	Eagle Field at Erk Russell Park	3,500	John Miglarese	
Toronto FC II	Toronto, Ontario	BMO Training Ground	1,000	Michael Rabasca	Toronto FC
FC Tucson	Tucson, Arizona	Kino Sports Complex	3,500	Darren Sawatzky	Phoenix Rising FC

MLS affiliated
MLS/USLC owned

=== Managerial changes ===
Team	Outgoing manager	Manner of departure	Date of vacancy	Incoming manager	Date of appointment
Orlando City B	(Spain) Fernando De Argila	Fired	July 25, 2019	(Costa Rica) Roberto Sibaja (Interim)	July 25, 2019

== League table ==
Pos	Team	Pld	W	D	L	GF	GA	GD	Pts	Qualification
1	North Texas SC	28	17	5	6	53	31	+22	56	Playoffs
2	Lansing Ignite FC	28	12	10	6	49	37	+12	46	Playoffs
3	Greenville Triumph SC	28	12	7	9	32	22	+10	43	Playoffs
4	Forward Madison FC	28	12	7	9	33	26	+7	43	Playoffs
5	Chattanooga Red Wolves SC	28	10	10	8	35	37	−2	40	
6	South Georgia Tormenta FC	28	9	10	9	32	34	−2	37	
7	Toronto FC II	28	9	9	10	43	46	−3	36	
8	FC Tucson	28	8	9	11	35	41	−6	33	
9	Richmond Kickers	28	9	5	14	26	35	−9	32	
10	Orlando City B	28	4	4	20	23	52	−29	16	

Source: 2019 USL League One standings
Rules for classification: 1) total wins; 2) total goal differential; 3) total goals scored; 4) points earned against top four Conference finishers; 5) disciplinary points; 6) coin toss or drawing of lots

== Results table ==
Color Key: Home • Away • Win • Loss • Draw
Club	Match																											
Club	1	2	3	4	5	6	7	8	9	10	11	12	13	14	15	16	17	18	19	20	21	22	23	24	25	26	27	28
Chattanooga Red Wolves (CHT)	NTX	MAD	GVL	TRM	RIC	ORL	MAD	TUC	GVL	TOR	RIC	GVL	RIC	LAN	ORL	MAD	TUC	LAN	NTX	TRM	NTX	TRM	TUC	TOR	LAN	ORL	RIC	TOR
Chattanooga Red Wolves (CHT)	2–3	1–0	0–1	3–2	0–1	0–0	2–2	0–4	1–0	2–2	2–0	3–2	1–0	1–1	1–1	1–1	1–1	0–2	1–0	2–1	0–2	1–1	0–1	2–2	3–4	2–1	2–1	1–1
Forward Madison FC (MAD)	CHT	NTX	ORL	GVL	TOR	CHT	TRM	NTX	LAN	ORL	TUC	NTX	TOR	TRM	LAN	CHT	ORL	TOR	TUC	RIC	GVL	RIC	GVL	TRM	RIC	NTX	TUC	LAN
Forward Madison FC (MAD)	0–1	0–1	2–1	0–0	3–1	2–2	0–1	1–3	0–1	1–2	2–1	4–1	1–1	2–1	2–3	1–1	1–0	4–1	1–0	0–1	0–0	1–0	0–1	1–1	1–0	1–0	1–1	1–0
Greenville Triumph SC (GVL)	TRM	LAN	CHT	RIC	MAD	NTX	LAN	RIC	CHT	TRM	LAN	CHT	ORL	NTX	ORL	TUC	NTX	TRM	TOR	MAD	TOR	MAD	RIC	TUC	TOR	TUC	ORL	TRM
Greenville Triumph SC (GVL)	0–1	2–1	1–0	0–1	0–0	0–1	1–1	1–0	0–1	0–0	1–1	2–3	2–0	0–0	1–0	1–3	4–0	1–0	3–1	0–0	0–0	1–0	0–1	4–0	3–1	3–2	0–1	1–3
Lansing Ignite FC (LAN)	RIC	GVL	RIC	TOR	TUC	RIC	GVL	NTX	TRM	MAD	TOR	GVL	TOR	ORL	NTX	CHT	MAD	TUC	TOR	TRM	CHT	ORL	ORL	NTX	TUC	CHT	TRM	MAD
Lansing Ignite FC (LAN)	3–2	1–2	3–1	0–2	0–2	2–2	1–1	2–2	0–0	1–0	0–3	1–1	1–0	2–0	1–3	1–1	3–2	2–2	3–3	1–1	2–0	3–0	2–1	4–1	5–0	4–3	1–1	0–1
North Texas SC (NTX)	CHT	MAD	ORL	GVL	ORL	LAN	MAD	TOR	RIC	TOR	MAD	TUC	LAN	GVL	RIC	TRM	GVL	CHT	TUC	CHT	LAN	TRM	TOR	ORL	RIC	TRM	MAD	TUC
North Texas SC (NTX)	3–2	1–0	1–0	1–0	4–1	2–2	3–1	2–3	3–0	3–3	1–4	1–0	3–1	0–0	2–0	0–0	0–4	0–1	1–1	2–0	1–4	5–0	2–0	3–1	4–0	2–1	0–1	3–1
Orlando City B (ORL)	TUC	TOR	TRM	MAD	NTX	CHT	NTX	TOR	RIC	TUC	MAD	TUC	TRM	LAN	GVL	CHT	GVL	RIC	TRM	MAD	LAN	LAN	TUC	NTX	TOR	CHT	GVL	RIC
Orlando City B (ORL)	1–3	0–2	1–1	1–2	0–1	0–0	1–4	2–0	3–2	2–2	2–1	1–2	0–2	0–2	0–2	1–1	0–1	0–1	1–4	0–1	0–3	1–2	1–3	1–3	2–3	1–2	1–0	0–2
Richmond Kickers (RIC)	LAN	TRM	LAN	GVL	CHT	LAN	TUC	GVL	ORL	NTX	TUC	CHT	TRM	CHT	NTX	ORL	TOR	MAD	TOR	MAD	TRM	GVL	NTX	MAD	TUC	CHT	TOR	ORL
Richmond Kickers (RIC)	2–3	0–0	1–3	1–0	1–0	2–2	2–0	0–1	2–3	0–3	0–0	0–2	0–1	0–1	0–2	1–0	2–1	1–0	2–2	0–1	4–1	1–0	0–4	0–1	0–0	1–2	1–2	2–0
Tormenta FC (TRM)	GVL	TUC	RIC	ORL	CHT	TUC	TOR	MAD	LAN	GVL	ORL	RIC	MAD	TOR	NTX	ORL	LAN	GVL	CHT	TUC	CHT	NTX	RIC	MAD	NTX	LAN	TOR	GVL
Tormenta FC (TRM)	1–0	3–1	0–0	1–1	2–3	2–0	3–2	1–0	0–0	0–0	2–0	1–0	1–2	0–3	0–0	4–1	1–1	0–1	1–2	1–1	1–1	0–5	1–4	1–1	1–2	1–1	0–1	3–1
Toronto FC II (TOR)	ORL	TUC	LAN	MAD	TRM	ORL	TUC	NTX	CHT	LAN	NTX	LAN	MAD	TUC	TRM	LAN	RIC	MAD	GVL	RIC	GVL	NTX	CHT	ORL	GVL	TRM	RIC	CHT
Toronto FC II (TOR)	2–0	1–1	2–0	1–3	2–3	0–2	1–0	3–2	2–2	3–0	3–3	0–1	1–1	1–3	3–0	3–3	1–2	1–4	1–3	2–2	0–0	0–2	2–2	3–2	1–3	1–0	2–1	1–1
FC Tucson (TUC)	ORL	TRM	TOR	TRM	LAN	RIC	CHT	TOR	ORL	RIC	ORL	MAD	NTX	TOR	LAN	GVL	CHT	MAD	NTX	TRM	ORL	CHT	LAN	GVL	RIC	GVL	MAD	NTX
FC Tucson (TUC)	3–1	1–3	1–1	0–2	2–0	0–2	4–0	0–1	2–2	0–0	2–1	1–2	0–1	3–1	2–2	3–1	1–1	0–1	1–1	1–1	3–1	1–0	0–5	0–4	0–0	2–3	1–1	1–3

== Playoffs ==
Semifinals
1	North Texas SC	2
4	Forward Madison FC	0
2	Lansing Ignite FC	0
3	Greenville Triumph SC	1

Finals
1	North Texas SC	1
3	Greenville Triumph SC	0

=== Semifinals ===
October 12, 2019
7:00pm (EDT)

Lansing Ignite FC	0–1	Greenville Triumph SC
Coiffic (yellow card) 70'; Cerda (yellow card) 74'; Cleveland (yellow card) 87'	Report	Clowes (yellow card) 37'; Mohamed (yellow card) 45+2'; Polak (yellow card) 46'; Bermudez 59'; Gómez (yellow card) 79'

Cooley Law School Stadium
Lansing, Michigan
Attendance: 2,340
Referee: Matthew Thompson

October 12, 2019
7:00pm (CDT)

North Texas SC	2–0	Forward Madison FC
Roberts (yellow card) 32'; Cerrillo (yellow card) 36'; Pepi 76', 78'; Jatta (yellow card) 88'	Report	Toyama (yellow card) 8'; Leonard (yellow card) 33'

Toyota Stadium
Frisco, Texas
Attendance: 4,067
Referee: Elijio Arreguin

=== USL League One Championship ===
October 19, 2019
6:00pm (CDT)

North Texas SC	1–0	Greenville Triumph SC
Jatta (yellow card) 7'; Rodríguez 60'; Damus (yellow card) 90+4'	Report

Toyota Stadium
Frisco, Texas
Attendance: 3,245
Referee: Jon Freemon

Championship Game MVP: (Mexico) Arturo Rodríguez (North Texas SC)

== Attendance ==
=== Average home attendances ===
Ranked from highest to lowest average attendance.

Team	GP	Total	High	Low	Average
Forward Madison FC	14	60,083	4,663	3,762	4,292
Richmond Kickers	14	48,555	5,936	1,089	3,468
Lansing Ignite FC	14	38,614	4,818	1,725	2,758
Greenville Triumph SC	14	35,131	4,014	1,570	2,509
Tormenta FC	14	24,133	3,519	1,038	1,724
Chattanooga Red Wolves SC	14	22,842	3,527	512	1,632
North Texas SC	14	19,136	3,512	615	1,367
FC Tucson	14	13,451	1,772	702	961
Orlando City B	14	2,836	327	144	203
Toronto FC II	14	2,358	525	51	168
Total	140	267,139	5,936	51	1,908

Sources: USL Soccer Stadium Digest

== Statistical leaders ==
=== Top scorers ===
Rank	Player	Club	Goals
1	(Haiti) Ronaldo Damus	North Texas SC	16
2	(Canada) Jordan Perruzza	Toronto FC II	15
3	(United States) Jordan Jones	FC Tucson	10
3	(South Africa) Tumi Moshobane	Lansing Ignite FC	10
5	(Republic of Ireland) Steven Beattie	Chattanooga Red Wolves	9
5	(United States) Jake Keegan	Greenville Triumph SC	9
5	(United States) Ricardo Pepi	North Texas SC	9
8	(Italy) Marco Micaletto	Tormenta FC	8
8	(Jamaica) Don Smart	Forward Madison FC	8
10	(Mexico) Pato Botello Faz	Lansing Ignite FC	7
10	(Spain) Carlos Gómez	Greenville Triumph SC	7
10	(United States) Sito Seoane	Chattanooga Red Wolves	7
10	(Mexico) Arturo Rodriguez	North Texas SC	7

=== Top assists ===
Rank	Player	Club	Assists
1	(Mexico) Arturo Rodriguez	North Texas SC	10
2	(Brazil) Rafael Mentzingen	Lansing Ignite FC	7
2	(Albania) Vangjel Zguro	Chattanooga Red Wolves	7
4	(United States) Conner Antley	Tormenta FC	6
4	(United States) Matt Bolduc	Richmond Kickers	6
6	(Spain) Carlos Gómez	Greenville Triumph SC	5
6	(United States) Xavier Gomez	Lansing Ignite FC	5
6	(Brazil) Paulo Jr.	Forward Madison FC	5
6	(Brazil) Serginho	Orlando City B	5
6	(Jamaica) Don Smart	Forward Madison FC	5
6	(Canada) Matthew Srbely	Toronto FC II	5

=== Clean sheets ===
Rank	Player	Club	Clean sheets
1	(Guam) Dallas Jaye	Greenville Triumph SC	13
2	(Mexico) Carlos Avilez	North Texas SC	9
2	(Japan) Akira Fitzgerald	Richmond Kickers	9
2	(Chile) Pablo Jara	Tormenta FC	9
5	(United States) Stefan Cleveland	Lansing Ignite FC	7
6	(United States) Alex Mangels	Chattanooga Red Wolves	6
7	(Haiti) Brian Sylvestre	Forward Madison FC	5
8	(United States) Phillip Ejimadu	FC Tucson	4
9	(Brazil) Juliano Chade	Orlando City B	3
9	(United States) Eric Klenofsky	Toronto FC II	3

=== Hat-tricks ===
Player	Club	Against	Result	Date
(United States) Ricardo Pepi	North Texas SC	Chattanooga Red Wolves	3–2	March 30
(Haiti) Ronaldo Damus	North Texas SC	Toronto FC II	3–3	June 12
(Republic of Ireland) Steven Beattie	Chattanooga Red Wolves	Greenville Triumph SC	3–2	June 22
(Haiti) Ronaldo Damus	North Texas SC	Richmond Kickers	4–0	September 10
(Spain) Carlos Gómez	Greenville Triumph SC	FC Tucson	4–0	September 13

== League awards ==
=== Individual awards ===
- Most Valuable Player: (Mexico) Arturo Rodriguez (NTX)
- Defender of the Year: (United States) Conner Antley (TRM)
- Young Player of the Year: (Mexico) Arturo Rodriguez (NTX)
- Goalkeeper of the Year: (Guam) Dallas Jaye (GVL)
- Coach of the Year: (United States) Eric Quill (NTX)
- Golden Boot: (Haiti) Ronaldo Damus (NTX)
- Assists Champion: (Mexico) Arturo Rodriguez (NTX)
- Golden Glove: (Guam) Dallas Jaye (GVL)
- Goal of the Year: (Republic of Ireland) Mikie Rowe (TRM)
- Save of the Year: (United States) Phillip Ejimadu (TUC)

=== All-League Teams ===
First team
Goalkeeper	Defenders	Midfielders	Forwards
(Guam) Dallas Jaye (GVL) (Goalkeeper of the Year and Golden Glove)	(United States) Conner Antley (TRM) (Defender of the Year) (Mexico) Christian Díaz (MAD) (United States) Tyler Polak (GVL) (United States) Cole Seiler (GVL)	(United States) Joe Gallardo (RIC) (South Africa) Tumi Moshobane (LAN) (Mexico) Arturo Rodriguez (NTX) (MVP, Assists Champion, and Young Player of the Year)	(Republic of Ireland) Steven Beattie (CHT) (Haiti) Ronaldo Damus (NTX) (Golden Boot) (Canada) Jordan Perruzza (TOR)

Second team
Goalkeeper	Defenders	Midfielders	Forwards
(United States) Alex Mangels (CHT)	(Ghana) Wahab Ackwei (RIC) (Denmark) Patrick Bunk-Andersen (TOR) (United States) Brandon Fricke (LAN) (United States) Nick Moon (LAN)	(The Gambia) Alfusainey Jatta (NTX) (Brazil) Rafael Mentzingen (LAN) (Brazil) Ualefi (CHT)	(United States) Jordan Jones (TUC) (United States) Ricardo Pepi (NTX) (Brazil) Paulo Jr. (MAD)

=== Midseason awards ===
Goalkeeper of the Year		Defender of the Year		Coach of the Year		Young Player of the Year		Player of the Year		References
(Chile) Pablo Jara	South Georgia Tormenta FC	(United States) Conner Antley	South Georgia Tormenta FC	(England) Eric Quill	North Texas SC	(Canada) Jordan Perruzza	Toronto FC II	(Jamaica) Don Smart	Forward Madison FC	

USL League One Monthly Awards
Month	Player of the Month			Goal of the Month			Save of the Month		Coach of the Month		References
Month	Player	Club	Position	Player	Club	Position	Goalkeeper	Club	Coach	Club	References
March / April	(United States) Conner Antley	Tormenta FC	Defender	(Brazil) Lucas Coutinho	Tormenta FC	Midfielder	(United States) Phillip Ejimadu	FC Tucson	(United States) John Miglarese	Tormenta FC	
May	(Mexico) Arturo Rodriguez	North Texas SC	Midfielder	(Brazil) Sérginho	Orlando City B	Midfielder	(Republic of Ireland) Ryan Coulter	Forward Madison FC	(United States) Eric Quill	North Texas SC	
June	(United States) Stefan Cleveland	Lansing Ignite FC	Goalkeeper	(Brazil) Rafael Santos	Orlando City B	Midfielder	(Chile) Pablo Jara	Tormenta FC	(United States) Tim Hankinson	Chattanooga Red Wolves	
July	(Brazil) Rafael Mentzingen	Lansing Ignite FC	Midfielder	(Japan) Shinya Kadono	Tormenta FC	Midfielder	(Chile) Pablo Jara	Tormenta FC	(United States) Daryl Shore	Forward Madison FC	
August	(Guam) Dallas Jaye	Greenville Triumph SC	Goalkeeper	(Republic of Ireland) Mikie Rowe	Tormenta FC	Forward	(United States) Phillip Ejimadu	FC Tucson	(Israel) Nate Miller	Lansing Ignite FC	
September	(Spain) Carlos Gomez	Greenville Triumph SC	Midfielder	(England) Paul Clowes	Greenville Triumph SC	Midfielder	(Guam) Dallas Jaye	Greenville Triumph SC	(United States) Eric Quill	North Texas SC	
October	No Award			(United States) Chris Bermudez	Greenville Triumph SC	Midfielder	(United States) Kyle Zobeck	North Texas SC	No Award		

USL League One Player of the Week
Week	Player	Club	Position	Reason	Ref.
1	(United States) Ricardo Pepi	North Texas SC	Forward	Hat trick vs Chattanooga	
2	(United States) Conner Antley	Tormenta FC	Defender	3 assists vs Tucson	
3	(United States) Grant Stoneman	Lansing Ignite FC	Defender	9 of 11 duels	
4	(Republic of Ireland) Steven Beattie	Chattanooga Red Wolves	Forward	2 goals	
5	(Brazil) Lucas Coutinho	Tormenta FC	Midfielder	Game winning goal vs Tucson	
6	(Jamaica) Don Smart	Forward Madison FC	Midfielder	1 goal 2 assists	
7	(England) Charlie Dennis	Tormenta FC	Midfielder	2 goals	
8	(United States) Devyn Jambga	FC Tucson	Midfielder	2 goals	
9	(United States) Alex Mangels	Chattanooga Red Wolves	Goalkeeper	4 save shutout	
10	(Canada) Jacob Shaffelburg	Toronto FC II	Forward	1 goal, 2 assists	
11	(Brazil) Thiago De Souza	Orlando City B	Midfielder	1 goal, 1 assist	
12	(Haiti) Ronaldo Damus	North Texas SC	Forward	Hat trick vs Toronto	
13	(Republic of Ireland) Steven Beattie	Chattanooga Red Wolves	Forward	Hat trick vs Greenville	
14	(Haiti) Ronaldo Damus	North Texas SC	Forward	2 goals	
15	(Guam) Dallas Jaye	Greenville Triumph SC	Goalkeeper	3 save shutout	
16	(Brazil) Rafael Mentzingen	Lansing Ignite FC	Midfielder	1 goal 2 assists	
17	(United States) Devyn Jambga	FC Tucson	Midfielder	2 goals	
18	(United States) Tyler Polak	Greenville Triumph SC	Defender	2 assists vs North Texas	
19	(South Africa) Tumi Moshobane	Lansing Ignite FC	Midfielder	2 goals 1 assist	
20	(Spain) Carlos Gomez	Greenville Triumph SC	Midfielder	2 assists vs Toronto	
21	(Canada) Callum Montgomery	North Texas SC	Defender	Game winning goal vs Chattanooga	
22	(Mexico) Pato Botello Faz	Lansing Ignite FC	Forward	2 goals vs North Texas	
23	(United States) Joe Gallardo	Richmond Kickers	Forward	2 goals vs Tormenta FC	
24	(Mexico) Pato Botello Faz	Lansing Ignite FC	Forward	2 goals 1 assist vs Tucson	
25	(Spain) Carlos Gomez	Greenville Triumph SC	Midfielder	Hat trick vs Tucson	
26	(England) Paul Clowes	Greenville Triumph SC	Midfielder	1 goal 1 assist vs Toronto	
27	(Albania) Vangjel Zguro	Chattanooga Red Wolves	Midfielder	1 assist vs Richmond	
28	(Canada) Jordan Perruzza	Toronto FC II	Forward	3 goals in 2 games	

USL League One Goal of the Week
Week	Player	Club	Opponent	Ref.
1	(Republic of Ireland) Steven Beattie	Chattanooga Red Wolves	North Texas SC	
2	(Canada) Jordan Perruzza	Toronto FC II	Orlando City B	
3	(United States) Jamael Cox	FC Tucson	Toronto FC II	
4	(United States) Joe Gallardo	Richmond Kickers	Greenville Triumph SC	
5	(Brazil) Lucas Coutinho	Tormenta FC	FC Tucson	
6	(Canada) Jacob Shaffelburg	Toronto FC II	Forward Madison FC	
7	(United States) Tanner Tessmann	North Texas SC	Orlando City B	
8	(United States) Ricardo Pepi	North Texas SC	Lansing Ignite FC	
9	(Brazil) Sérginho	Orlando City B	Richmond Kickers	
10	(Brazil) Rafael Santos	Orlando City B	FC Tucson	
11	(Brazil) Rafael Santos	Orlando City B	Forward Madison FC	
12	(United States) Alex Morrell	Tormenta FC	Orlando City B	
13	(Jamaica) Don Smart	Forward Madison FC	North Texas SC	
14	(Canada) Jordan Perruzza	Toronto FC II	Forward Madison FC	
15	(United States) Andrew Wheeler-Omiunu	FC Tucson	Toronto FC II	
16	(Cameroon) Elma N'For	Lansing Ignite FC	Forward Madison FC	
17	(United States) Devyn Jambga	FC Tucson	Greenville Triumph SC	
18	(Japan) Shinya Kadono	Tormenta FC	Lansing Ignite FC	
19	(Jamaica) Don Smart	Forward Madison FC	FC Tucson	
20	(Brazil) Lucas Coutinho	Tormenta FC	Chattanooga Red Wolves	
21	(United States) Daniel Jackson	Richmond Kickers	Toronto FC II	
22	(England) Charlie Dennis	Tormenta FC	Chattanooga Red Wolves	
23	(Republic of Ireland) Mikie Rowe	Tormenta FC	Richmond Kickers	
24	(Canada) Jordan Faria	Toronto FC II	Chattanooga Red Wolves	
25	(Mexico) Arturo Rodríguez	North Texas SC	Tormenta FC	
26	(England) Paul Clowes	Greenville Triumph SC	Toronto FC II	
27	(Argentina) Franco Ramos Mingo	Toronto FC II	Tormenta FC	
28	(Spain) Carlos Gómez	Greenville Triumph SC	Tormenta FC	

USL League One Save of the Week
Week	Player	Club	Opponent	Ref.
1	(Chile) Pablo Jara	Tormenta FC	Greenville Triumph SC	
2	(United States) Mike Kirk	Lansing Ignite FC	Greenville Triumph SC	
3	(Brazil) Juliano Chade	Orlando City B	Tormenta FC	
4	(Republic of Ireland) Ryan Coulter	Forward Madison FC	Orlando City B	
5	(United States) Phillip Ejimadu	FC Tucson	Tormenta FC	
6	(Republic of Ireland) Ryan Coulter	Forward Madison FC	Toronto FC II	
7	(United States) Kyle Ihn	Lansing Ignite FC	Greenville Triumph SC	
8	(Chile) Pablo Jara	Tormenta FC	Forward Madison FC	
9	(United States) Phillip Ejimadu	FC Tucson	Toronto FC II	
10	(Chile) Pablo Jara	Tormenta FC	Greenville Triumph SC	
11	(United States) Phillip Ejimadu	FC Tucson	Richmond Kickers	
12	(Chile) Pablo Jara	Tormenta FC	Orlando City B	
13	(Haiti) Brian Sylvestre	Forward Madison FC	North Texas SC	
14	(Brazil) Juliano Chade	Orlando City B	Greenville Triumph SC	
15	(Chile) Pablo Jara	Tormenta FC	Forward Madison FC	
16	(Mexico) Christian Herrera	Orlando City B	Greenville Triumph SC	
17	(Chile) Pablo Jara	Tormenta FC	North Texas SC	
18	(Chile) Pablo Jara	Tormenta FC	Lansing Ignite FC	
19	(Haiti) Brian Sylvestre	Forward Madison FC	FC Tucson	
20	(Mexico) Carlos Merancio	FC Tucson	North Texas SC	
21	(Haiti) Brian Sylvestre	Forward Madison FC	Greenville Triumph SC	
22	(United States) Phillip Ejimadu	FC Tucson	Orlando City B	
23	(Guam) Dallas Jaye	Greenville Triumph SC	Forward Madison FC	
24	(Japan) Akira Fitzgerald	Richmond Kickers	Greenville Triumph SC	
25	(Chile) Pablo Jara	Tormenta FC	North Texas SC	
26	(Haiti) Brian Sylvestre	Forward Madison FC	North Texas SC	
27	(Guam) Dallas Jaye	Greenville Triumph SC	Orlando City B	
28	(United States) Joe Rice	Richmond Kickers	Toronto FC II	

USL League One Team of the Week
Week	Goalkeeper	Defenders	Midfielders	Forwards	Ref.
**1**	(Chile) Jara (TRM)	(United States) Ledbetter (TUC) (Australia) Phelps (TRM) (United States) Stoneman (LAN)	(Republic of Ireland) Beattie (CHT) (United States) Politz (GVL) (United States) X. Gomez (LAN) (The Gambia) Jatta (NTX)	(Italy) Micaletto (TRM) (United States) **Pepi** (NTX) (Spain) Delgado (TUC)	
**2**	(United States) Mangels (CHT)	(United States) **Antley** (TRM) (United States) Tobin (MAD) (Jamaica) Dixon (CHT) (Ghana) Ackwei (RIC)	(United States) Politz (GVL) (Canada) Petrasso (TOR) (England) Dennis (TRM)	(United States) Keegan (GVL) (Italy) Micaletto (TRM) (Puerto Rico) Vega (TUC)	
**3**	(Brazil) Chade (ORL)	(United States) **Stoneman** (LAN) (Canada) Montgomery (NTX) (United States) Moon (LAN) (United States) Wakasa (TUC)	(United States) Dorsey (TOR) (Brazil) Ualefi (CHT) (Spain) C. Gómez (GVL)	(United States) Pepi (NTX) (United States) Cox (TUC) (United States) Keegan (GVL)	
**4**	(Republic of Ireland) Coulter (MAD)	(United States) Antley (TRM) (Ghana) Ackwei (RIC) (Brazil) M. Silva (ORL) (United States) Russell (MAD)	(United States) Polak (GVL) (United States) Hughes (RIC) (Argentina) Caparelli (CHT) (Panama) Núñez (MAD)	(Republic of Ireland) **Beattie** (CHT) (United States) Gallardo (RIC)	
**5**	(Brazil) Chade (ORL)	(United States) Antley (TRM) (United States) Seiler (GVL) (United States) Russell (MAD) (Ghana) Ackwei (RIC)	(Chile) Ovalle (TOR) (Brazil) **Coutinho** (TRM) (Zambia) Mwape (RIC) (Canada) Petrasso (TOR)	(Mexico) A. Rodriguez (NTX) (United States) Morrell (TRM)	
**6**	(United States) Ejimadu (TUC)	(The Gambia) Jatta (NTX) (United States) Shanosky (RIC) (Spain) Terrón (TUC) (Canada) Simeon (ORL) (United States) Politz (GVL)	(Jamaica) **Smart** (MAD) (Jamaica) Chin (RIC) (United States) Roberts (NTX) (Brazil) Paulo Jr. (MAD)	(United States) Jackson (RIC)	
**7**	(Haiti) Sylvestre (MAD)	(United States) Lee (GVL) (United States) Walls (CHT) (France) Coiffic (LAN)	(Zambia) Mwape (RIC) (United States) Tessmann (NTX) (England) **Dennis** (TRM) (Mexico) A. Rodriguez (NTX) (United States) M. Rodriguez (RIC)	(Canada) Perruzza (TOR) (United States) Ward (GVL)	
**8**	(Chile) Jara (TRM)	(Brazil) M. Silva (ORL) (United States) Wakasa (TUC) (United States) Antley (TRM)	(United States) **Jambga** (TUC) (United States) Seiler (GVL) (Brazil) Coutinho (TRM) (United States) X. Gomez (LAN)	(United States) Pepi (NTX) (Brazil) De Souza (ORL) (United States) Keegan (GVL)	
**9**	(United States) **Mangels** (CHT)	(Canada) Mohammed (TOR) (United States) Almaguer (NTX) (Australia) Phelps (TRM)	(United States) D. Rodriguez (NTX) (Brazil) Sérginho (ORL) (Somalia) Mohamed (GVL) (Haiti) Damus (NTX)	(Canada) Perruzza (TOR) (France) Coiffic (LAN) (Brazil) De Souza (ORL)	
**10**	(Guam) Jaye (GVL)	(Guyana) Mohammed (TOR) (Albania) Zguro (CHT) (United States) Stoneman (LAN)	(United States) Wheeler-Omiunu (TUC) (Brazil) Santos (ORL) (Trinidad and Tobago) Sealy (NTX) (Canada) Petrasso (TOR)	(United States) Moon (LAN) (Canada) **Shaffelburg** (TOR) (United States) Pepi (NTX)	
**11**	(Japan) Fitzgerald (RIC)	(Trinidad and Tobago) Mohammed (TOR) (United States) Batista (TUC) (Denmark) Bunk-Andersen (TOR) (Ghana) Ackwei (RIC)	(Brazil) **De Souza** (ORL) (Japan) Toyama (MAD) (United States) Cox (TUC) (Canada) Srbely (TOR)	(Brazil) Rafael (ORL) (Canada) Perruzza (TOR)	
**12**	(United States) Mangels (CHT)	(United States) Venter (TUC) (United States) Antley (TRM) (United States) Seiler (GVL)	(Canada) Srbely (TOR) (Spain) Vinyals (TRM) (United States) Pineda (CHT) (Mexico) A. Rodriguez (NTX)	(United States) Seoane (CHT) (Haiti) **Damus** (NTX) (Brazil) Paulo Jr. (MAD)	
**13**	(United States) Cleveland (LAN)	(France) Coiffic (LAN) (Australia) Phelps (TRM) (United States) Lockaby (RIC)	(Jamaica) Smart (MAD) (Italy) Micaletto (TRM) (Chile) Cerda (LAN) (United States) Pineda (CHT)	(United States) Keegan (GVL) (Republic of Ireland) **Beattie** (CHT) (Panama) Núñez (MAD)	
**14**	(United States) K. Silva (TOR)	(Canada) Campbell (TOR) (United States) J. Gómez (NTX) (United States) Tobin (MAD) (United States) Seiler (GVL)	(Mexico) A. Rodriguez (NTX) (Spain) C. Gómez (GVL) (United States) Leonard (MAD)	(United States) Keegan (GVL) (Haiti) **Damus** (NTX) (Republic of Ireland) Beattie (CHT)	
**15**	(Guam) **Jaye** (GVL)	(United States) Lee (GVL) (United States) Murillo (NTX) (United States) Schneider (MAD) (United States) Walls (CHT)	(Saint Kitts and Nevis) Somersall (TUC) (United States) X. Gomez (LAN) (United States) Wheeler-Omiunu (TUC) (Panama) Núñez (MAD)	(United States) White (MAD) (United States) Jones (TUC)	
**16**	(Brazil) Chade (ORL)	(United States) Roberts (NTX) (Ghana) Amponsah (CHT) (Denmark) Bunk-Andersen (TOR) (Canada) Montgomery (NTX)	(United States) Dorsey (TOR) (United States) Walker (GRN) (Brazil) **Mentzingen** (LAN)	(United States) Jones (TUC) (South Africa) Moshobane (LAN) (Canada) Perruzza (TOR)	
**17**	(Mexico) Merancio (TUC)	(United States) Stripling (TUC) (Canada) Montgomery (NTX) (Haiti) Saint-Vil (TRM) (Denmark) Bunk-Andersen (TOR)	(United States) X. Gomez (LAN) (United States) **Jambga** (TUC) (Mexico) A. Rodriguez (NTX) (Canada) Petrasso (TOR)	(United States) Jones (TUC) (Jamaica) Chin (RIC)	
**18**	(Chile) Jara (TRM)	(United States) Antley (TRM) (United States) Venter (TUC) (United States) **Polak** (GVL)	(United States) Walker (GVL) (United States) Moon (LAN) (United States) Hughes (RIC) (Italy) Micaletto (TRM) (United States) Banks (MAD)	(United States) Keegan (GVL) (Libya) Zayed (CHT)	
**19**	(United States) Cleveland (LAN)	(United States) Omsberg (MAD) (Ghana) Amponsah (CHT) (Mexico) Diaz (MAD)	(Brazil) Mentzingen (LAN) (United States) Walker (GVL) (South Africa) **Moshobane** (LAN) (Brazil) Paulo Jr. (MAD)	(Jamaica) Smart (MAD) (United States) Keegan (GVL) (Cameroon) N'For (LAN)	
**20**	(Mexico) Merancio (TUC)	(Brazil) Magalhaes (RIC) (United States) Walls (CHT) (United States) Almaguer (NTX)	(Mexico) A. Rodriguez (NTX) (Scotland) Boland (GVL) (United States) Hughes (RIC) (Spain) **C. Gomez** (GVL)	(United States) Jones (TUC) (United States) Keegan (GVL) (United States) Seoane (CHT)	
**21**	(Guam) Jaye (GVL)	(Canada) **Montgomery** (NTX) (United States) Omsberg (MAD) (United States) Stoneman (LAN)	(United States) X. Gomez (LAN) (Mexico) A. Rodriguez (NTX) (Brazil) Mentzingen (LAN) (Canada) Srbely (TOR) (Italy) Micaletto (TRM)	(United States) Jackson (RIC) (United States) Jones (TUC)	
**22**	(United States) Klenofsky (TOR)	(Mexico) Diaz (MAD) (Trinidad and Tobago) Mohammed (TOR) (United States) Seiler (GVL)	(United States) Moon (LAN) (England) Dennis (TRM) (South Africa) Moshobane (LAN) (United States) Virgen (TUC) (United States) Seoane (CHT)	(Mexico) **Pato** (LAN) (United States) Jones (TUC)	
**23**	(United States) Maurer (NTX)	(United States) Reynolds (NTX) (United States) Polak (GVL) (United States) Batista (TUC)	(Mexico) A. Rodriguez (NTX) (United States) Virgen (TUC) (United States) Walker (GVL) (United States) Bolduc (RIC)	(United States) Pepi (NTX) (United States) **Gallardo** (RIC) (Jamaica) Chin (RIC)	
**24**	(Japan) Fitzgerald (RIC)	(United States) Nelson (NTX) (Brazil) Magalhaes (RIC) (United States) Stoneman (LAN)	(United States) Troyer (RIC) (Republic of Ireland) Beattie (CHT) (Italy) Micaletto (TRM) (South Africa) Moshobane (LAN)	(Mexico) **Pato** (LAN) (Haiti) Damus (NTX) (Brazil) Paulo Jr. (MAD)	
**25**	(Haiti) Sylvestre (MAD)	(United States) Omsberg (MAD) (United States) Lee (GVL) (Ghana) Ackwei (RIC)	(Mexico) A. Rodriguez (NTX) (Ghana) Danso (NTX) (Spain) **C. Gomez** (GVL) (Brazil) Mentzingen (LAN)	(Haiti) Damus (NTX) (South Africa) Moshobane (LAN) (Canada) Perruzza (TOR)	
**26**	(Japan) Fitzgerald (RIC)	(Mexico) Diaz (MAD) (France) Coiffic (LAN) (United States) Antley (TRM) (United States) Walls (CHT)	(United States) Moon (LAN) (England) **Clowes** (GVL) (Spain) C. Gomez (GVL) (United States) Pineda (CHT) (United States) Banks (MAD)	(England) Saul (GVL)	
**27**	(Brazil) Chade (ORL)	(Argentina) Mingo (TOR) (United States) Mendoza (ORL) (Mexico) Diaz (MAD)	(Albania) **Zguro** (CHT) (Canada) Nelson (TOR) (Brazil) Ualefi (CHT) (Canada) Shaffelburg (TOR) (Jamaica) Smart (MAD)	(United States) Jones (TUC) (England) Saul (GVL)	
**28**	(United States) Mangels (CHT)	(Mexico) Diaz (MAD) (United States) Antley (TRM) (United States) Shanosky (RIC)	(United States) Arslan (TRM) (United States) Banks (MAD) (Zambia) Mwape (RIC) (Jamaica) Smart (MAD)	(Canada) **Perruzza** (TOR) (United States) Romero (NTX) (England) Dennis (TRM)	
**Bold** denotes Player of the Week

== See also ==
- USL League One
- 2019 USL Championship season
