= 2019 Forward Madison FC season =

Forward Madison FC
2019 season
- Owner: Big Top Events
- Managing director: Peter Wilt
- Head coach: Daryl Shore
- Stadium: Breese Stevens Field
- USL League One: 4th
- USL1 Playoffs: Semifinals
- U.S. Open Cup: Third round
- Top goalscorer: League: Don Smart (8); All: Don Smart (9)
- Highest home attendance: 4,663 (August 28 vs. Greenville Triumph SC)
- Lowest home attendance: 3,762 (May 18 vs. Tormenta FC)
- Average home league attendance: 4,292
- Biggest win: 3 goals: ELP 0–3 MAD (May 15, USOC); MAD 4–1 NTX (June 22); TOR 1–4 MAD (July 31)
- Biggest defeat: 2 goals: NTX 3–1 MAD (May 22); STL 3–1 MAD (May 29, USOC); NTX 2–0 MAD (October 12, playoffs)
Home colors	Away colors	Third colors

The 2019 Forward Madison FC season was the inaugural season in the soccer team's history, where they competed in the third division of American soccer, USL League One, the first season of the competition. Forward Madison FC also participated in the 2019 U.S. Open Cup. Forward Madison FC played their home games at Breese Stevens Field, located in Madison, Wisconsin, United States.

== Overview ==
The USL League One schedule was announced on December 10, 2018.

== Club ==
=== Roster ===
No.	Pos.	Nat.	Name	Date of birth (age)	Since	On loan from
1	GK	(Republic of Ireland)	Ryan Coulter	February 8, 1989 (age 37)	2019	
2	DF	(United States)	Carter Manley	April 29, 1996 (age 30)	2019	Minnesota United FC
3	MF	(United States)	Eric Leonard	October 5, 1995 (age 31)	2018	
6	MF	(United States)	Brandon Eaton	October 31, 1994 (age 32)	2019	
7	MF	(Jamaica)	Don Smart	December 2, 1987 (age 38)	2018	
10	MF	(Ecuador)	Danny Tenorio	December 22, 1992 (age 33)	2018	
11	FW	(Brazil)	Paulo Jr.	January 23, 1989 (age 37)	2018	
12	MF	(Tanzania)	Ally Hamis Ng'anzi	September 3, 2000 (age 26)	2019	Minnesota United FC
13	DF	(United States)	Connor Tobin (captain)	February 11, 1987 (age 39)	2019	
14	FW	(United States)	Brian Bement	July 2, 1993 (age 33)	2018	
15	DF	(United States)	Shaun Russell	July 18, 1993 (age 33)	2019	
17	MF	(Jamaica)	Zaire Bartley	March 5, 1998 (age 28)	2018	
19	MF	(Tanzania)	Vital Nizigiyimana	January 1, 1997 (age 29)	2019	
20	FW	(United States)	Oliver White	September 17, 1994 (age 32)	2019	Memphis 901 FC
21	MF	(United States)	Louis Bennett II	May 19, 1995 (age 31)	2019	Memphis 901 FC
22	DF	(United States)	Wyatt Omsberg	September 21, 1995 (age 31)	2019	Minnesota United FC
23	DF	(United States)	Carl Schneider	November 19, 1992 (age 33)	2019	
27	DF	(Mexico)	Christian Díaz	April 7, 1991 (age 35)	2019	
29	FW	(United States)	J. C. Banks	August 24, 1989 (age 37)	2018	
70	MF	(Panama)	Josiel Núñez	January 29, 1993 (age 33)	2018	(Panama) C.D. Universitario
77	MF	(Panama)	Jiro Barriga Toyama	April 28, 1995 (age 31)	2019	
92	GK	(Haiti)	Brian Sylvestre	December 19, 1992 (age 33)	2019	
97	GK	(Canada)	Dayne St. Clair	May 9, 1997 (age 29)	2019	Minnesota United FC

=== Out on loan ===
No.	Pos.	Nat.	Name	Date of birth (age)	Since	On loan to
33	GK	(United States)	Brandon Barnes	November 16, 1994 (age 31)	2019	Charlotte Independence

=== Coaching staff ===
Name	Position
(United States) Daryl Shore	Head coach and technical director
(United States) Neil Hlavaty	Assistant coach
(Republic of Ireland) Ryan Coulter	Goalkeeping coach

=== Front office staff ===
Name	Position
(United States) Conor Caloia	Chief operating officer
(United States) Vern Stenman	President
(United States) Peter Wilt	Managing director

== Transfers ==
=== Transfers in ===
Date from	Position	Player	Last team	Type	Ref.
October 24, 2018	MF	(Jamaica) Don Smart	Fresno FC	Free transfer	
November 26, 2018	MF	(Ecuador) Danny Tenorio	Naples United FC	Free transfer	
November 29, 2018	MF	(United States) Jeff Michaud	Miami FC	Free transfer	
December 6, 2018	MF	(Panama) Josiel Núñez	(Panama) C.D. Universitario	Loan	
December 10, 2018	FW	(Brazil) Paulo Jr.	Penn FC	Free transfer	
December 18, 2018	FW	(United States) Brian Bement	Jacksonville Armada FC	Free transfer	
December 18, 2018	MF	(United States) Eric Leonard	(Australia) Nerang Eagles SC	Free transfer	
December 21, 2018	FW	(United States) J. C. Banks	Jacksonville Armada FC	Free transfer	
December 31, 2018	MF	(Jamaica) Zaire Bartley	(Czech Republic) MFK Vyškov	Free transfer	
January 14, 2019	GK	(Haiti) Brian Sylvestre	LA Galaxy	Free transfer	
January 30, 2019	MF	(United States) Brandon Eaton	Richmond Kickers	Free transfer	
February 4, 2019	DF	(United States) Connor Tobin	North Carolina FC	Free transfer	
February 5, 2019	DF	(United States) Carl Schneider	(Sweden) IFK Åmål	Free transfer	
February 12, 2019	MF	(Tanzania) Vital Nizigiyimana	Madison 56ers	Free transfer	
February 17, 2019	DF	(Mexico) Christian Díaz	(Mexico) Tlaxcala F.C.	Free transfer	
February 20, 2019	GK	(Republic of Ireland) Ryan Coulter	Emerald Force SC	Free transfer	
March 4, 2019	MF	(Tanzania) Ally Hamis Ng'anzi	Minnesota United FC	Loan	
March 5, 2019	MF	(Panama) Jiro Barriga Toyama	Laredo Heat	Free transfer	
March 25, 2019	DF	(United States) Shaun Russell	Richmond Kickers	Free transfer	
April 2, 2019	GK	(United States) Brandon Barnes	Richmond Kickers	Free transfer	
April 4, 2019	DF	(United States) Carter Manley	Minnesota United FC	Loan	
April 4, 2019	DF	(United States) Wyatt Omsberg	Minnesota United FC	Loan	
April 4, 2019	GK	(Canada) Dayne St. Clair	Minnesota United FC	Loan	
April 4, 2019	FW	(United States) Mason Toye	Minnesota United FC	Loan	
July 1, 2019	MF	(United States) Louis Bennett II	Memphis 901 FC	Loan	
July 1, 2019	FW	(United States) Oliver White	Memphis 901 FC	Loan	
July 12, 2019	FW	(Ghana) Abu Danladi	Minnesota United FC	Loan	

=== Transfers out ===
Date from	Position	Player	Last team	Type	Ref.
June 16, 2019	FW	(United States) Mason Toye	Minnesota United FC	End of loan	
June 27, 2019	MF	(United States) Jeff Michaud		Released	
July 15, 2019	FW	(Ghana) Abu Danladi	Minnesota United FC	End of loan	
August 29, 2019	GK	(United States) Brandon Barnes	Charlotte Independence	Loan	

== Kits ==
- Shirt sponsor: Dairyland Insurance
- Shirt manufacturer: Hummel

Home
Away
Third
Goalkeeper
Goalkeeper
gold alternate
Goalkeeper
pink alternate

== Exhibitions ==
February 22, 2019 Preseason 1	Forward Madison FC	1–0	Indy Eleven	Loves Park, Illinois
2:00 PM CST	Bartley 55'	Report	Walker (yellow card) 82'	Stadium: Mercyhealth Sportscore Two
Note: Closed to the public

March 2, 2019 Preseason 2	Saint Louis FC	1–0	Forward Madison FC	Fenton, Missouri
1:00 PM CST	Dacres 28'	Report		Stadium: Toyota Stadium; Attendance: 0
Note: Closed to the public

March 5, 2019 Preseason 3	Saint Louis Billikens	Cancelled	Forward Madison FC	Fenton, Missouri
7:00 PM CST				Stadium: Toyota Stadium
Note: Cancelled due to adverse weather conditions

March 10, 2019 Preseason 4	Forward Madison FC	1–4	Creighton Bluejays	Loves Park, Illinois
10:00 AM CDT	Banks 80'	Report	47'; 53'; 65'	Stadium: Mercyhealth Sportscore Two

March 15, 2019 Preseason 5	Forward Madison FC	7–1	Wisconsin–Parkside Rangers	Madison, Wisconsin
6:00 PM CDT	Omsberg 17', 50'; Toye 25', 63'; Leonard 38'; Eaton 87'; Bement 90'	Report	27'	Stadium: Irwin A. & Robert D. Goodman Sports Complex
Note: Closed to the public

March 30, 2019 Preseason 6	Marquette Golden Eagles	1–4	Forward Madison FC	Milwaukee, Wisconsin
7:45 PM CDT	Coan 23'	Report	Paulo Jr. 5', 19', 74'; Toye 60'	Stadium: Valley Fields

April 16, 2019 Midseason 1	Forward Madison FC	2–0	Wisconsin Badgers	Madison, Wisconsin
7:00 PM CDT	Bement 15'; Danladi 17'; Ng'anzi (yellow card) 88'	Report		Stadium: Breese Stevens Field

May 24, 2019 Midseason 2	Forward Madison FC (United States)	0–4	(Germany) Hertha BSC	Madison, Wisconsin
7:00 PM CDT		Report	Dilrosun 25' (Kalou); Lustenberger 45+1'; Selke 58' (pen.); Grujić 80'	Stadium: Breese Stevens Field; Attendance: 4,731; Referee: Calin Radosav

June 5, 2019 Midseason 3	Green Bay Voyageurs FC	1–1	Forward Madison FC	Ashwaubenon, Wisconsin
7:30 PM CDT	N. Markanich 15'	Report	Leonard 62' (Núñez)	Stadium: Capital Credit Union Park

June 25, 2019 Midseason 4	Forward Madison FC	1–2	Minnesota United FC	Madison, Wisconsin
7:00 PM CDT	Tenorio 57'	Report	Toye 23' (Miller), 80' (Martin); Kallman (yellow card) 35'	Stadium: Breese Stevens Field; Attendance: 4,821; Referee: Calin Radosav

July 16, 2019 Midseason 5	Forward Madison FC (United States)	2–1	(Mexico) Leones Negros	Madison, Wisconsin
7:00 PM CDT	Russell (yellow card) 7'; Núñez (yellow card) 44'; Bement 45'; N. Markanich 58' (A. Markanich)	Report	Ortiz Martínez (yellow card) 28'; Mora (yellow card) 30'; Sánchez 37'; Quintero (yellow card) 47'; López (yellow card) 52'; Lomelli (yellow card) 61'; Ceballos (red card) 90'	Stadium: Breese Stevens Field; Attendance: 4,802; Referee: Adam Behrens

August 21, 2019 Midseason 6	Wisconsin Badgers	1–2	Forward Madison FC	Madison, Wisconsin
7:00 PM CDT		Report		Stadium: McClimon Soccer Complex
Note: 60 minute scrimmage

September 17, 2019 Midseason 7	Forward Madison FC	2–1	Milwaukee Torrent	Madison, Wisconsin
7:00 PM CDT	Bement 49' (Bartley), 56' (Bartley)	Report	D'Imperio 15'	Stadium: Breese Stevens Field; Referee: Ryan Shanklin

== Competitions ==
=== Overview ===
Competition	First match	Last match	Starting round	Final position	Record							
Competition	First match	Last match	Starting round	Final position	Pld	W	D	L	GF	GA	GD	Win %
USL League One	April 6, 2019	October 5, 2019	Matchday 1	4th	28	12	7	9	33	26	+7	42.86
USL1 Playoffs	October 12, 2019		Semifinals	Semifinals	1	0	0	1	0	2	−2	0.00
U.S. Open Cup	May 7, 2019	May 29, 2019	First round	Third round	3	2	0	1	6	3	+3	66.67
Total					32	14	7	11	39	31	+8	43.75

Source: Competitions

=== USL League One ===
==== Standings ====
Pos	Team	Pld	W	D	L	GF	GA	GD	Pts	Qualification
1	North Texas SC	28	17	5	6	53	31	+22	56	Playoffs
2	Lansing Ignite FC	28	12	10	6	49	37	+12	46	Playoffs
3	Greenville Triumph SC	28	12	7	9	32	22	+10	43	Playoffs
4	Forward Madison FC	28	12	7	9	33	26	+7	43	Playoffs
5	Chattanooga Red Wolves SC	28	10	10	8	35	37	−2	40	
6	South Georgia Tormenta FC	28	9	10	9	32	34	−2	37	
7	Toronto FC II	28	9	9	10	43	46	−3	36	
8	FC Tucson	28	8	9	11	35	41	−6	33	
9	Richmond Kickers	28	9	5	14	26	35	−9	32	
10	Orlando City B	28	4	4	20	23	52	−29	16	

Source: 2019 USL League One standings
Rules for classification: 1) total wins; 2) total goal differential; 3) total goals scored; 4) points earned against top four Conference finishers; 5) disciplinary points; 6) coin toss or drawing of lots

==== Results summary ====
Overall								Home						Away					
Pld	W	D	L	GF	GA	GD	Pts	W	D	L	GF	GA	GD	W	D	L	GF	GA	GD
28	12	7	9	33	26	+7	43	7	3	4	15	9	+6	5	4	5	18	17	+1

Source: USL

==== Results by round ====
Round	1	2	3	4	5	6	7	8	9	10	11	12	13	14	15	16	17	18	19	20	21	22	23	24	25	26	27	28
Stadium	A	A	A	H	H	A	H	A	H	A	H	H	A	A	A	H	H	A	H	H	A	H	H	H	A	H	A	A
Result	L	L	W	D	W	D	L	L	L	L	W	W	D	W	L	D	W	W	W	L	D	W	L	D	W	W	D	W
Position	9	9	8	7	4	3	6	8	9	10	10	6	7	7	8	8	8	4	4	5	6	4	4	4	4	4	4	4

Source: USL
A = Away; H = Home; W = Win; D = Draw; L = Loss

==== Matches ====
April 6, 2019 1	Chattanooga Red Wolves SC	1–0	Forward Madison FC	Chattanooga, Tennessee
7:00 PM EDT	Seoane (yellow card) 34'; Zayed 67' (Beattie); Zguro (yellow card) 85'	Report	Núñez (yellow card) 15'; Smart (yellow card) 45+2'	Stadium: David Stanton Field; Attendance: 3,527; Referee: Danielle Chesky

April 13, 2019 2	North Texas SC	1–0	Forward Madison FC	Frisco, Texas
9:20 PM CDT	Romero (yellow card) 7'; Pepi 90+5' (pen.)	Report	Bement (yellow card) 19'; Bartley (yellow card) 90+3'; Coulter (yellow card) 90+5'	Stadium: Toyota Stadium; Attendance: 1,924; Referee: Chris Ruska

April 19, 2019 3	Orlando City B	1–2	Forward Madison FC	Montverde, Florida
7:30 PM EDT	Granitur (yellow card) 25'; Osei-Wusu 36' (pen.); Sérginho (yellow card) 55'; Simeon (yellow card) 67'	Report	Núñez 58' (Paulo Jr.); Russell 70' (Tobin); Toye (yellow card) 72'; Smart (yellow card) 81' (yellow-red card) 81'; Michaud (yellow card) 85'	Stadium: Montverde Academy; Attendance: 189; Referee: Natalie Simon

April 27, 2019 4	Forward Madison FC	0–0	Greenville Triumph SC	Madison, Wisconsin
7:30 PM CDT	Barriga Toyama (yellow card) 48'; Michaud (yellow card) 85'; Tobin (yellow card) 90+2'	Report	Bermudez (yellow card) 42'; Polak (yellow card) 63'; Boland (yellow card) 65'	Stadium: Breese Stevens Field; Attendance: 4,462; Referee: Joshua Encarnación

May 4, 2019 5	Forward Madison FC	3–1	Toronto FC II	Madison, Wisconsin
7:00 PM CDT	Paulo Jr. 33' (Smart); Manley 68' (Smart); Banks (yellow card) 89'; Smart 90+6' (Paulo Jr.)	Report	Shaffelburg 43' (Dunn-Johnson)	Stadium: Breese Stevens Field; Attendance: 3,806; Referee: Calin Radosav

May 11, 2019 6	Chattanooga Red Wolves SC	2–2	Forward Madison FC	Chattanooga, Tennessee
7:00 PM EDT	Doyle 2' (Soto); Beattie (yellow card) 16'; Zguro (yellow card) 38'; Walls (yellow card) 45+1'; Zayed 56'	Report	Banks (yellow card) 21'; Zguro 53' (o.g.); Núñez 55'; Paulo Jr. (yellow card) 69'; Smart (yellow card) 73'	Stadium: David Stanton Field; Attendance: 1,423; Referee: Amin Hadzic

May 18, 2019 7	Forward Madison FC	0–1	South Georgia Tormenta FC	Madison, Wisconsin
7:00 PM CDT	Tobin (yellow card) 45+4'	Report	Antley 50'; Micaletto (yellow card) 90'; Vinyals (yellow card) 90+2'	Stadium: Breese Stevens Field; Attendance: 3,762; Referee: Matthew Corrigan

May 22, 2019 8	North Texas SC	3–1	Forward Madison FC	Frisco, Texas
7:00 PM CDT	Damus 3' (Pepi); D. Rodríguez; Bissainthe (yellow card) 27'; Almaguer 70' (Hinojosa); Hinojosa (yellow card) 84'; Rayo (yellow card) 87'	Report	Sylvestre (yellow card) 10'; Smart 15' (Barriga Toyama); Paulo Jr. (yellow card) 42'; Bement (yellow card) 68'	Stadium: Toyota Stadium; Attendance: 1,103; Referee: Adam Kilpatrick

June 1, 2019 9	Forward Madison FC	0–1	Lansing Ignite FC	Madison, Wisconsin
7:00 PM CDT	Banks (yellow card) 39'; Núñez (red card) 90+7'	Report	Moon 47' (Stoneman); Stoneman (yellow card) 51'; Cerda (yellow card) 80'	Stadium: Breese Stevens Field; Attendance: 4,271; Referee: Brad Jensen

June 7, 2019 10	Orlando City B	2–1	Forward Madison FC	Montverde, Florida
7:30 PM EDT	Rafael 23' (Thiago); Mendoza (yellow card) 61'; Thiago; Herrera (yellow card) 69'	Report	Schneider (yellow card) 41'; Ng'anzi (yellow card) 54'; Michaud (yellow card) 59'; Bement 89' (Eaton)	Stadium: Montverde Academy; Attendance: 327; Referee: Gabriele Giusti

June 15, 2019 11	Forward Madison FC	2–1	FC Tucson	Madison, Wisconsin
7:00 PM CDT	Paulo Jr. 1' (Bement); Eaton (yellow card) 23'; Banks 34' (Paulo Jr.)	Report	Venter 90+5' (Virgen)	Stadium: Breese Stevens Field; Attendance: 4,020; Referee: Karen Abt

June 22, 2019 12	Forward Madison FC	4–1	North Texas SC	Madison, Wisconsin
7:00 PM CDT	Smart 33', 64' (Eaton); Díaz (yellow card) 49'; Núñez 78' (Smart); Banks 84' (Michaud)	Report	Damus; Jatta (yellow card) 64'	Stadium: Breese Stevens Field; Attendance: 4,211; Referee: Luis Arroyo

June 28, 2019 13	Toronto FC II	1–1	Forward Madison FC	Toronto, Ontario
4:00 PM EDT	Perruzza 45' (Waja); Mingo (yellow card) 77'; Mohammed (yellow card) 83'	Report	Díaz (yellow card) 59'; Tenorio 81'	Stadium: BMO Training Ground; Attendance: 102; Referee: Carly Shaw-MacLaren

July 6, 2019 14	South Georgia Tormenta FC	1–2	Forward Madison FC	Statesboro, Georgia
8:00 PM EDT	Morrell (yellow card) 83'; Micaletto 90+1'	Report	Smart 16' (Núñez); Schneider (yellow card) 53'; White 73' (Paulo Jr.); Díaz (yellow card) 83'	Stadium: Eagle Field at Erk Russell Athletic Park; Attendance: 1,529; Referee: Joshua Encarnación

July 9, 2019 15	Lansing Ignite FC	3–2	Forward Madison FC	Lansing, Michigan
7:00 PM EDT	N'For 17'; Mentzigen, (yellow card) 90+3'; Bruce 90+5' (Mentzigen)	Report	Smart 32' (White), (yellow card) 50'; Bennett (yellow card) 63'; Banks 90+4'	Stadium: Cooley Law School Stadium; Attendance: 1,871; Referee: Kevin Fikar

July 13, 2019 16	Forward Madison FC	1–1	Chattanooga Red Wolves SC	Madison, Wisconsin
7:00 PM CDT	Núñez (yellow card) 17'; Tobin 20' (Tenorio); Bement (yellow card) 73'	Report	Ualefi (yellow card) 22'; Beattie (yellow card) 54'; Walls (yellow card) 58'; Amponsah 77' (Zguro)	Stadium: Breese Stevens Field; Attendance: 4,442; Referee: Becky Pagan

July 27, 2019 17	Forward Madison FC	1–0	Orlando City B	Madison, Wisconsin
7:00 PM CDT	Smart (yellow card) 30'; Banks 57' (Núñez); Leonard (yellow card) 83'; Bement (yellow card) 89'; Díaz (yellow card) 90+4'	Report	Diouf (yellow card) 34'; Hill (yellow card) 67'; Simas (yellow card) 83'; Herrera (yellow card) 89'	Stadium: Breese Stevens Field; Attendance: 4,539; Referee: Laura Rodriguez

July 31, 2019 18	Toronto FC II	1–4	Forward Madison FC	Toronto, Ontario
4:00 PM EDT	Perruzza 68' (Fraser); Dorsey (yellow card) 73' (yellow-red card) 81'; Fraser (yellow card) 87'	Report	Paulo Jr. 42' (Smart), 61' (White); Romeo 65' (o.g.); Bement 86' (Bennett)	Stadium: BMO Training Ground; Attendance: 64; Referee: Myriam Marcotte

August 3, 2019 19	Forward Madison FC	1–0	FC Tucson	Madison, Wisconsin
7:00 PM CDT	Leonard (yellow card) 18'; Smart 44' (Núñez); White (yellow card) 46'; Núñez (yellow card) 76'; Banks (yellow card) 90+5'	Report	Spencer (yellow card) 60'	Stadium: Breese Stevens Field; Attendance: 4,350; Referee: Jonathan Bilinski

August 10, 2019 20	Forward Madison FC	0–1	Richmond Kickers	Madison, Wisconsin
7:00 PM CDT	Bement (yellow card) 81'; Leonard (yellow card) 84'	Report	Ackwei (yellow card) 48'; Jackson 69'; Troyer (yellow card) 76'	Stadium: Breese Stevens Field; Attendance: 4,510; Referee: Calin Radosav

August 17, 2019 21	Greenville Triumph SC	0–0	Forward Madison FC	Greenville, South Carolina
7:00 PM EDT	Clowes (yellow card) 18'	Report	White (yellow card) 17'; Smart (yellow card) 55'	Stadium: Legacy Early College Field; Attendance: 2,457; Referee: Alyssa Nichols

August 24, 2019 22	Forward Madison FC	1–0	Richmond Kickers	Madison, Wisconsin
7:00 PM CDT	Díaz 74' (Paulo Jr.)	Report	Mwape (yellow card) 78'	Stadium: Breese Stevens Field; Attendance: 4,517; Referee: Joshua Encarnación

August 28, 2019 23	Forward Madison FC	0–1	Greenville Triumph SC	Madison, Wisconsin
7:00 PM CDT	Manley (yellow card) 22'	Report	Bermudez 42' (Walker); Clowes (yellow card) 59'; Keegan (yellow card) 84'	Stadium: Breese Stevens Field; Attendance: 4,663; Referee: Luis Arroyo

September 7, 2019 24	Forward Madison FC	1–1	South Georgia Tormenta FC	Madison, Wisconsin
7:00 PM CDT	Paulo Jr. 24' (Banks)	Report	Micaletto 80' (Arslan)	Stadium: Breese Stevens Field; Attendance: 4,215; Referee: Karen Callado

September 14, 2019 25	Richmond Kickers	0–1	Forward Madison FC	Richmond, Virginia
7:00 PM EDT	Magalhães (yellow card) 65'; Troyer (yellow card) 78'	Report	Tenorio 6' (Núñez); Omsberg (yellow card) 52'	Stadium: City Stadium; Attendance: 4,140; Referee: Gabriele Giusti

September 22, 2019 26	Forward Madison FC	1–0	North Texas SC	Madison, Wisconsin
4:00 PM CDT	Almaguer 24' (o.g.); Díaz (yellow card) 37'; Russell (yellow card) 71'	Report	Cerrillo (yellow card) 29'; Reynolds (yellow card) 41'	Stadium: Breese Stevens Field; Attendance: 4,315; Referee: Adam Kilpatrick

September 27, 2019 27	FC Tucson	1–1	Forward Madison FC	Tucson, Arizona
7:30 PM MST	Jones 31' (Terrón); Batista (yellow card) 66'	Report	Smart 45+3' (pen.); Tobin (yellow card) 80'	Stadium: Kino North Stadium; Attendance: 638; Referee: Marco Vega

October 5, 2019 28	Lansing Ignite FC	0–1	Forward Madison FC	Lansing, Michigan
7:00 PM EDT	N'For (yellow card) 20'; Fricke (yellow card) 59'; Moshobane (yellow card) 73'; Williams (yellow card) 87'	Report	Omsberg (yellow card) 31'; Banks 43' (Smart); Núñez (yellow card) 66'; Paulo Jr. (yellow card) 68'; Díaz (yellow card) 81'; Leonard (yellow card) 90+4'	Stadium: Cooley Law School Stadium; Attendance: 2,412; Referee: José Lara

==== USL League One Playoffs ====
October 12, 2019 Semifinals	North Texas SC	2–0	Forward Madison FC	Frisco, Texas
7:00 PM (CDT)	Roberts (yellow card) 32'; Cerrillo (yellow card) 36'; Pepi; Jatta (yellow card) 88'	Report	Barriga Toyama (yellow card) 8'; Leonard (yellow card) 33'	Stadium: Toyota Stadium; Attendance: 4,067; Referee: Elijio Arreguin

=== U.S. Open Cup ===
May 7, 2019 First round	Milwaukee Bavarian SC (Wisconsin)	0–2	(Wisconsin) Forward Madison FC	Milwaukee, Wisconsin
7:30 PM CDT	Lorenz (yellow card) 46'; Zamani (yellow card) 55'	Report	Eaton 9' (Bement); Barriga Toyama 36' (Smart); Ng'anzi (yellow card) 77'	Stadium: Uihlein Soccer Park; Attendance: 400; Referee: Peter Bernardy

May 15, 2019 Second round	El Paso Locomotive FC (Texas)	0–3	(Wisconsin) Forward Madison FC	El Paso, Texas
7:00 PM MDT	Navarro (yellow card) 23'; Kiffe (yellow card) 75'; Salgado (yellow card) 80'	Report	Barriga Toyama 19' (Paulo Jr.), (yellow card) 78'; Díaz 26' (Barriga Toyama); Michaud 76' (Paulo Jr.), (yellow card) 83'	Stadium: Southwest University Park; Attendance: 600; Referee: Marco Vega

May 29, 2019 Third round	Saint Louis FC (Missouri)	3–1	(Wisconsin) Forward Madison FC	Fenton, Missouri
7:00 PM CDT	Gee 2'; Abend 6'; Umar (yellow card) 51'; Bahner (yellow card) 56'; Cicerone 72' (Hilton)	Report	Smart 38' (Michaud); Michaud (yellow card) 82'	Stadium: World Wide Technology Soccer Park; Attendance: 1,206; Referee: Ryan Cook

== Statistics ==
=== Appearances and goals ===
No.	Pos.	Nat.	Name	USL1 Season			USL1 Playoffs			U.S. Open Cup			Total		
No.	Pos.	Nat.	Name	Apps	Starts	Goals	Apps	Starts	Goals	Apps	Starts	Goals	Apps	Starts	Goals
1	GK	(Republic of Ireland)	Ryan Coulter	7	7	0	0	0	0	0	0	0	7	7	0
2	DF	(United States)	Carter Manley	19	19	1	1	1	0	0	0	0	20	20	1
3	MF	(United States)	Eric Leonard	27	25	0	1	1	1	2	1	0	30	27	0
6	MF	(United States)	Brandon Eaton	11	5	0	1	0	0	3	1	1	15	6	1
7	MF	(Jamaica)	Don Smart	27	25	8	1	0	0	3	2	1	31	27	9
10	MF	(Ecuador)	Danny Tenorio	11	7	2	0	0	0	0	0	0	11	7	2
11	FW	(Brazil)	Paulo Jr.	27	25	5	1	1	0	2	2	0	30	28	5
12	MF	(Tanzania)	Ally Hamis Ng'anzi	3	2	0	0	0	0	1	1	0	4	3	0
13	DF	(United States)	Connor Tobin	27	27	1	1	1	0	3	3	0	31	31	1
14	FW	(United States)	Brian Bement	18	2	2	1	1	0	3	1	0	22	4	2
15	DF	(United States)	Shaun Russell	15	12	1	0	0	0	3	3	0	18	15	1
17	MF	(Jamaica)	Zaire Bartley	8	1	0	1	0	0	2	0	0	11	1	0
19	MF	(Tanzania)	Vital Nizigiyimana	0	0	0	0	0	0	0	0	0	0	0	0
20	FW	(United States)	Oliver White	11	7	1	0	0	0	0	0	0	11	7	1
21	MF	(United States)	Louis Bennett II	9	2	0	0	0	0	0	0	0	9	2	0
22	DF	(United States)	Wyatt Omsberg	14	14	0	1	1	0	0	0	0	15	15	0
23	DF	(United States)	Carl Schneider	10	9	0	0	0	0	2	2	0	12	11	0
27	DF	(Mexico)	Christian Díaz	26	25	1	1	1	0	3	3	1	30	29	2
29	FW	(United States)	J. C. Banks	27	25	5	1	1	0	3	3	0	31	29	5
70	MF	(Panama)	Josiel Núñez	26	26	3	1	1	0	2	2	0	29	29	3
77	MF	(Panama)	Jiro Barriga Toyama	25	8	0	1	1	0	3	3	2	29	12	2
92	GK	(Haiti)	Brian Sylvestre	16	16	0	1	1	0	3	3	0	20	20	0
97	GK	(Canada)	Dayne St. Clair	5	5	0	0	0	0	0	0	0	5	5	0
Players who left Forward Madison FC during the season
8	MF	(United States)	Jeff Michaud	10	7	0	0	0	0	3	1	1	13	8	1
9	FW	(United States)	Mason Toye	7	6	0	0	0	0	0	0	0	7	6	0
33	GK	(United States)	Brandon Barnes	0	0	0	0	0	0	0	0	0	0	0	0
99	FW	(Ghana)	Abu Danladi	1	1	0	0	0	0	0	0	0	1	1	0

=== Goalscorers ===
Rank	Position	Name	USL1 Season	USL1 Playoffs	U.S. Open Cup	Total
1	MF	(Jamaica) Don Smart	8	0	1	9
2	FW	(United States) J. C. Banks	5	0	0	5
2	FW	(Brazil) Paulo Jr.	5	0	0	5
4	MF	(Panama) Josiel Núñez	3	0	0	3
5	MF	(Panama) Jiro Barriga Toyama	0	0	2	2
5	FW	(United States) Brian Bement	2	0	0	2
5	DF	(Mexico) Christian Díaz	1	0	1	2
5	MF	(Ecuador) Danny Tenorio	2	0	0	2
9	MF	(United States) Brandon Eaton	0	0	1	1
9	DF	(United States) Carter Manley	1	0	0	1
9	MF	(United States) Jeff Michaud	0	0	1	1
9	DF	(United States) Shaun Russell	1	0	0	1
9	DF	(United States) Connor Tobin	1	0	0	1
9	FW	(United States) Oliver White	1	0	0	1
Own goal			3	0	0	3
Total			33	0	6	39

=== Assist scorers ===
Rank	Position	Name	USL1 Season	USL1 Playoffs	U.S. Open Cup	Total
1	FW	(Brazil) Paulo Jr.	5	0	2	7
2	MF	(Jamaica) Don Smart	5	0	1	6
3	MF	(Panama) Josiel Núñez	4	0	0	4
4	MF	(Panama) Jiro Barriga Toyama	1	0	1	2
4	FW	(United States) Brian Bement	1	0	1	2
4	MF	(United States) Brandon Eaton	2	0	0	2
4	MF	(United States) Jeff Michaud	1	0	1	2
4	FW	(United States) Oliver White	2	0	0	2
9	FW	(United States) J. C. Banks	1	0	0	1
9	MF	(United States) Louis Bennett II	1	0	0	1
9	FW	(Ecuador) Danny Tenorio	1	0	0	1
9	DF	(United States) Connor Tobin	1	0	0	1
Total			25	0	6	31

=== Clean sheets ===
Rank	Name	USL1 Season	USL1 Playoffs	U.S. Open Cup	Total
1	(Haiti) Brian Sylvestre	5	0	2	7
2	(Republic of Ireland) Ryan Coulter	2	0	0	2
3	(Canada) Dayne St. Clair	1	0	0	1
Total		8	0	2	10

=== Disciplinary record ===
Rank	Position	Name	USL1 Season			USL1 Playoffs			U.S. Open Cup			Total		
Rank	Position	Name	Yellow card	(yellow card) (yellow-red card)	Red card	Yellow card	(yellow card) (yellow-red card)	Red card	Yellow card	(yellow card) (yellow-red card)	Red card	Yellow card	(yellow card) (yellow-red card)	Red card
1	MF	(Jamaica) Don Smart	5	1	0	0	0	0	0	0	0	5	1	0
2	DF	(Mexico) Christian Díaz	6	0	0	0	0	0	0	0	0	6	0	0
2	MF	(Panama) Josiel Núñez	4	0	1	0	0	0	0	0	0	4	0	1
4	FW	(United States) Brian Bement	5	0	0	0	0	0	0	0	0	5	0	0
4	MF	(United States) Eric Leonard	4	0	0	1	0	0	0	0	0	5	0	0
4	MF	(United States) Jeff Michaud	3	0	0	0	0	0	2	0	0	5	0	0
7	FW	(United States) J. C. Banks	4	0	0	0	0	0	0	0	0	4	0	0
8	MF	(Panama) Jiro Barriga Toyama	1	0	0	1	0	0	1	0	0	3	0	0
8	FW	(Brazil) Paulo Jr.	3	0	0	0	0	0	0	0	0	3	0	0
8	DF	(United States) Connor Tobin	3	0	0	0	0	0	0	0	0	3	0	0
11	MF	(Tanzania) Ally Hamis Ng'anzi	1	0	0	0	0	0	1	0	0	2	0	0
11	DF	(United States) Wyatt Omsberg	2	0	0	0	0	0	0	0	0	2	0	0
11	DF	(United States) Carl Schneider	2	0	0	0	0	0	0	0	0	2	0	0
11	FW	(United States) Oliver White	2	0	0	0	0	0	0	0	0	2	0	0
15	FW	(Jamaica) Zaire Bartley	1	0	0	0	0	0	0	0	0	1	0	0
15	MF	(United States) Louis Bennett II	1	0	0	0	0	0	0	0	0	1	0	0
15	GK	(Republic of Ireland) Ryan Coulter	1	0	0	0	0	0	0	0	0	1	0	0
15	MF	(United States) Brandon Eaton	1	0	0	0	0	0	0	0	0	1	0	0
15	DF	(United States) Carter Manley	1	0	0	0	0	0	0	0	0	1	0	0
15	DF	(United States) Shaun Russell	1	0	0	0	0	0	0	0	0	1	0	0
15	GK	(Haiti) Brian Sylvestre	1	0	0	0	0	0	0	0	0	1	0	0
15	FW	(United States) Mason Toye	1	0	0	0	0	0	0	0	0	1	0	0
Total			53	1	1	2	0	0	4	0	0	59	1	1

== Honors and awards ==
=== USL League One Yearly Awards ===
==== Individual awards ====
Award	Finish	Player	Ref.
Defender of the Year	Finalist	(Mexico) Christian Díaz	
Save of the Year	Finalist	(Republic of Ireland) Ryan Coulter	
Midseason Most Valuable Player	Winner	(Jamaica) Don Smart	

==== All-League Team ====
Team	Position	Player	Ref.
First	DF	(Mexico) Christian Díaz	
Second	FW	(Brazil) Paulo Jr.	

=== USL League One Monthly Awards ===
Month	Award	Player	Ref.
May	Save of the Month	(Republic of Ireland) Ryan Coulter	
July	Coach of the Month	(United States) Daryl Shore	

=== USL League One Weekly Awards ===
==== Player of the Week ====
Week	Position	Player	Ref.
6	MF	(Jamaica) Don Smart	

==== Goal of the Week ====
Week	Player	Opponent	Ref.
13	(Jamaica) Don Smart	North Texas SC	
19	(Jamaica) Don Smart	FC Tucson	

==== Save of the Week ====
Week	Player	Opponent	Ref.
4	(Republic of Ireland) Ryan Coulter	Orlando City B	
6	(Republic of Ireland) Ryan Coulter	Toronto FC II	
13	(Haiti) Brian Sylvestre	North Texas SC	
19	(Haiti) Brian Sylvestre	FC Tucson	
21	(Haiti) Brian Sylvestre	Greenville Triumph SC	
26	(Haiti) Brian Sylvestre	North Texas SC	

==== Team of the Week ====
Week	Position	Player	Ref.
2	DF	(United States) Connor Tobin	
4	GK	(Republic of Ireland) Ryan Coulter	
4	MF	(Panama) Josiel Núñez	
4	DF	(United States) Shaun Russell	
5	DF	(United States) Shaun Russell	
6	MF	(Brazil) Paulo Jr.	
6	MF	(Jamaica) Don Smart	
7	GK	(Haiti) Brian Sylvestre	
11	MF	(Panama) Jiro Barriga Toyama	
12	FW	(Brazil) Paulo Jr.	
13	FW	(Panama) Josiel Núñez	
13	MF	(Jamaica) Don Smart	
14	MF	(United States) Eric Leonard	
14	DF	(United States) Connor Tobin	
15	MF	(Panama) Josiel Núñez	
15	DF	(United States) Carl Schneider	
15	FW	(United States) Oliver White	
18	MF	(United States) J. C. Banks	
19	DF	(Mexico) Christian Díaz	
19	DF	(United States) Wyatt Omsberg	
19	MF	(Brazil) Paulo Jr.	
19	FW	(Jamaica) Don Smart	
21	DF	(United States) Wyatt Omsberg	
22	DF	(Mexico) Christian Díaz	
24	FW	(Brazil) Paulo Jr.	
25	DF	(United States) Wyatt Omsberg	
25	GK	(Haiti) Brian Sylvestre	
26	MF	(United States) J. C. Banks	
26	DF	(Mexico) Christian Díaz	
27	DF	(Mexico) Christian Díaz	
27	MF	(Jamaica) Don Smart	
28	MF	(United States) J. C. Banks	
28	DF	(Mexico) Christian Díaz	
28	MF	(Jamaica) Don Smart	
