= Eric Leonard =

American soccer player

Personal information
- Date of birth: October 5, 1995 (age 31)
- Place of birth: Palatine, Illinois, United States
- Height: 5 ft 9 in (1.75 m)
- Position: Defender

Youth career
- –2014: Chicago Sockers

College career
Years	Team	Apps	(Gls)
2014–2017	Butler Bulldogs	73	(6)

Senior career*
Years	Team	Apps	(Gls)
2017	OKC Energy U23	13	(1)
2018	Nerang Eagles		
2019–2022	Forward Madison	100	(1)
2023	Chicago Fire II	15	(1)
- * Club domestic league appearances and goals as of November 5, 2023

Eric Leonard (born October 5, 1995) is an American former soccer player who plays as a defender.

== Career ==
=== Youth and college career ===
In addition to playing for William Fremd High School, Leonard also served as the captain for the Sockers FC Chicago development academy. In 2014, he joined Butler University, making 73 appearances and scoring 6 goals for the Bulldogs during his four seasons. He was named to the Big East All-Rookie Team in his freshman year, and twice was included in the division's All-Tournament Team in 2016 and 2017. He also served as the team's captain in his senior year.

=== OKC Energy U23 ===
Leonard joined the OKC Energy U23 team of the PDL in 2017. He made 13 regular season appearances, scoring one goal, along with one appearance in the play-offs.

=== Nerang Eagles ===
In 2018, Leonard joined Australian club Nerang Eagles in the Gold Coast Premier League. At the end of the season, he won the Gold Coast Premier League Players' Player of the Year award.

=== Forward Madison FC ===
In December 2018, Forward Madison FC announced the signing of Leonard for the team's inaugural season in 2019. He made his league debut for the club on April 13, 2019, coming on as an 81st-minute substitute for Josiel Núñez in a 1–0 away defeat to North Texas SC.

Leonard is Forward Madison's all-time appearance leader, with 99 appearances across all competitive competitions.

=== Chicago Fire FC II ===
On December 13, 2022, Leonard was transferred from Forward Madison FC to the Chicago Fire FC organization. Details of the transfer were not disclosed. It was later reported that Leonard would start with Chicago Fire FC II of MLS Next Pro.

== Personal life ==
Leonard was born in Palatine, Illinois, a suburb of Chicago.
