= Phillip Ejimadu =

American soccer player

Personal information
- Full name: Phillip Chijoke Ejimadu
- Date of birth: August 31, 1999 (age 27)
- Place of birth: Minneapolis, Minnesota, United States
- Height: 6 ft 2 in (1.88 m)
- Position: Goalkeeper

Team information
- Current team: Kansas City Comets
- Number: 99

Youth career
- 2015–2018: Nacional-SP

Senior career*
Years	Team	Apps	(Gls)
2019–2020	Los Angeles FC	1	(0)
2019	→ FC Tucson (loan)	15	(0)
2020	→ San Diego Loyal (loan)	0	(0)
2021	Las Vegas Lights	0	(0)
2022	Rochester NY	1	(0)
2023	Flower City Union	1	(0)
2023–	Kansas City Comets (indoor)	55	(0)

International career^{‡}
2018	United States U20	3	(0)
- * Club domestic league appearances and goals as of May 7, 2026 ‡ National team caps and goals as of June 17, 2024

Phillip Chijoke Ejimadu (born August 31, 1999) is an American soccer player who plays as a goalkeeper for the Kansas City Comets in the Major Arena Soccer League.

== Career ==
=== Club ===
Ejimadu played in the youth academy of Nacional Atlético Clube in São Paulo, Brazil before returning to the United States to go pro. He signed with Major League Soccer outfit, Los Angeles FC on February 21, 2019. On March 29, 2019, Ejimadu went on a season-long loan to third-division, FC Tucson. The next day, Ejimadu made his professional debut for FC Tucson starting the entire match in a 3–1 victory at Orlando City B.

On September 23, 2020, Ejimadu moved on loan to USL Championship side San Diego Loyal.

On April 5, 2021, Ejimadu joined Las Vegas Lights FC ahead of the 2021 season.

On March 13, 2022, Ejimadu signed with MLS Next Pro side Rochester New York FC for the 2022 season.

Ejimadu signed with the Major Arena Soccer League's Kansas City Comets on October 17, 2023.

=== International ===
Ejimadu is eligible to represent Brazil, Nigeria, and the United States on the international level. In 2018, he was called into the training camp for the United States under-20 national team.

== Career statistics ==
As of May 7, 2026

Appearances and goals by club, season and competition
Club	Season	League			Cup		Continental		Playoffs		Other		Total	
Club	Season	Division	Apps	Goals	Apps	Goals	Apps	Goals	Apps	Goals	Apps	Goals	Apps	Goals
Los Angeles FC	2019	MLS	1	0	0	0	—	—	—	—	—	—	1	0
Los Angeles FC	2020	MLS	0	0	—	—	0	0	—	—	0	0	0	0
Los Angeles FC	Total		1	0	0	0	0	0	—	—	0	0	1	0
FC Tucson (loan)	2019	USL League One	15	0	—	—	—	—	—	—	—	—	15	0
San Diego Loyal (loan)	2020	USL Championship	0	0	—	—	—	—	—	—	—	—	0	0
Las Vegas Lights	2021	USL Championship	0	0	—	—	—	—	—	—	—	—	0	0
Rochester NY FC	2022	MLS Next Pro	1	0	3	0	—	—	0	0	—	—	4	0
Flower City Union	2023	NISA	1	0	—	—	—	—	—	—	—	—	1	0
Kansas City Comets	2023–24	MASL	55	0	—	—	—	—	—	—	—	—	55	0
Career Total			73	0	3	0	0	0	0	0	0	0	76	0
