= Danny Tenorio =

Ecuadorian football player (born 1992)

Personal information
- Full name: Danny José Tenorio Ortíz
- Date of birth: 22 December 1992 (age 33)
- Place of birth: Esmeraldas, Ecuador
- Height: 1.75 m (5 ft 9 in)
- Position: Midfielder

Youth career
- –2010: C.D. Everest
- 2010–2011: Independiente del Valle

Senior career*
Years	Team	Apps	(Gls)
2011–2012	C.D. Técnico Universitario		
2012–2016	C.S.D. Macará	6	(0)
2016–2018	Club Puerto Quito	11	(1)
2018	Naples United FC	11	(5)
2018–2019	Forward Madison FC	11	(2)
- * Club domestic league appearances and goals as of 25 July 2020

Danny José Tenorio Ortíz (born December 22, 1992) is an Ecuadorian free agent footballer who most recently played as a midfielder for Forward Madison FC in USL League One.

== Career ==
=== Forward Madison ===
In November 2018, Madison joined Forward Madison FC ahead of their inaugural season in USL League One, becoming the club's second-ever player in the process. He made his professional debut for the club on June 22, 2019, coming on in the 87th minute for J. C. Banks in a 4–1 victory over North Texas SC.
