= Oliver White (soccer) =

Jamaican American footballer

Personal information
- Date of birth: 17 September 1994 (age 32)
- Place of birth: Boston, Massachusetts, United States
- Height: 1.80 m (5 ft 11 in)
- Positions: Forward; attacking midfielder

College career
Years	Team	Apps	(Gls)
2012–2015	Harvard Crimson	62	(9)

Senior career*
Years	Team	Apps	(Gls)
2016	FC Boston	4	(2)
2017	FC Bulleen Lions	24	(9)
2018	Kingston City	26	(9)
2019	Memphis 901	3	(0)
2019	→ Forward Madison (loan)	11	(1)
2020	Cabinteely	0	(0)
- * Club domestic league appearances and goals as of 11 March 2020

Oliver White (born September 17, 1994) is a Jamaican American footballer who last played as a forward for Cabinteely in the League of Ireland First Division.

== Career ==
The 2012 Massachusetts Gatorade Player of the Year played 4 years of varsity soccer for Harvard University before signing for FC Boston in their inaugural USL League Two season. In December 2016, White signed for FC Bulleen Lions of the National Premier Leagues Victoria. In January 2018 White transferred from FC Bulleen to Kingston City FC. In March 2019 White signed for Memphis 901 FC of the USL Championship. On July 1, 2019, White was loaned to USL League One club Forward Madison FC for the remainder of the 2019 season. White signed for League of Ireland First Division outfit Cabinteely on March 1, 2020, scoring on his debut in the League of Ireland Cup First Round.

On July 11, 2020, White launched The Oliver White Foundation , a charitable organization with the goals of amplifying black excellence, donating monthly to programs that help uplift the Black community, and fundraising through sales of soccer jerseys that commemorate the life of black people shot by law enforcement officers.

As of October 2020, White appears to have retired from professional soccer; according to his Instagram page.

== Career statistics ==
Professional appearances – correct as of 11 March 2020.

Club	Season	League			National Cup		League Cup		Other		Total	
Club	Season	Division	Apps	Goals	Apps	Goals	Apps	Goals	Apps	Goals	Apps	Goals
FC Boston	2016	USL League Two	4	2	—		—		—		4	2
Bulleen Lions	2017	NPL Victoria 2	24	9	2	2	—		—		26	11
Kingston City	2018	NPL Victoria 2	26	9	3	1	—		—		29	10
Memphis 901	2019	USL Championship	3	0	1	0	—		—		4	0
Forward Madison (loan)	2019	USL League One	11	1	—		—		—		11	1
Cabinteely	2020	LOI First Division	0	0	0	0	1	1	0	0	1	1
Career Total			68	21	6	3	1	1	0	0	75	25
