= Ally Hamis Ng'anzi =

Tanzanian footballer

Personal information
- Full name: Ally Hamis Ng'anzi
- Date of birth: 3 September 2000 (age 26)
- Place of birth: Mwanza, Tanzania
- Height: 1.80 m (5 ft 11 in)
- Position: Midfielder

Team information
- Current team: Loudoun United
- Number: 6

Youth career
- –2017: Alliance Academy SC

Senior career*
Years	Team	Apps	(Gls)
2017–2018	Singida United		
2018–2020	Vyškov	1	(0)
2019	→ Minnesota United (loan)	0	(0)
2019	→ Forward Madison (loan)	3	(0)
2020–	Loudoun United	3	(0)

International career^{‡}
2016–2017	Tanzania U17 (Note: Only official CAF matches included.)	8	(0)
2018	Tanzania U20	3	(0)
- * Club domestic league appearances and goals as of 26 September 2020 ‡ National team caps and goals as of 4 April 2019

Ally Hamis Ng'anzi (born 3 September 2000) is a Tanzanian footballer who plays as a midfielder for Loudoun United in the USL Championship.

== Club career ==
=== Youth and early career ===
Ng'anzi was a member of the youth team Alliance Academy SC until December 2017, when he moved to Singida United in the Tanzanian Premier League.

=== Vyškov ===
In 2018, he moved to Czech third-division club Vyškov. Ng'anzi made his debut for Vyškov in Moravian–Silesian Football League on 10 November 2018, coming on as a substitute for the final 17 minutes of the match against Valašské Meziříčí, which finished as a 4–1 home win.

=== Move to the United States ===
On 4 March 2019, Ng'anzi joined Major League Soccer club Minnesota United FC on loan from Vyškov with an option to purchase. He was then immediately sub-loaned to Minnesota's affiliate Forward Madison FC for the club's inaugural season. Minnesota United declined his option at the end of the season.

On 24 January 2020, Ng'anzi signed with USL Championship side Loudoun United.

== International career ==
Ng'anzi was included in Tanzania's under-17 squad during 2017 Africa U-17 Cup of Nations qualification, helping the team qualify for the Africa U-17 Cup of Nations for first time. He was included in Tanzania's squad for the final tournament in Gabon. He appeared in all three of Tanzania's matches, with the team eliminated in the group stage of the tournament.

In 2018, Ng'anzi appeared for the under-20 team, making three appearances in 2019 Africa U-20 Cup of Nations qualification matches. He has also been called up to the under-23 national team.

== Personal life ==
Ng'anzi was born in the Tanzanian city of Mwanza, though he grew up in Dar es Salaam.
