= Zaire Bartley =

Jamaican footballer (born 1998)

Personal information
- Full name: Zaire Bartley
- Date of birth: 5 March 1998 (age 28)
- Place of birth: The Bronx, New York, United States
- Height: 1.70 m (5 ft 7 in)
- Position: Midfielder

Team information
- Current team: New Amsterdam
- Number: 80

Youth career
- 2013–2016: New York Red Bulls
- 2016: BW Gottschee Academy
- 2016–2017: New York Red Bulls

Senior career*
Years	Team	Apps	(Gls)
2017	New York Red Bulls II	3	(0)
2018	New York Cosmos B	9	(5)
2018	MFK Vyškov	5	(1)
2019	Forward Madison	9	(0)
2020–	New Amsterdam	4	(0)

International career
2015	Jamaica U17		
- * Club domestic league appearances and goals as of 29 September 2020

Zaire Bartley (born 5 March 1998) is a Jamaican footballer who plays as a midfielder for New Amsterdam FC in the National Independent Soccer Association.

== Career ==
=== Club ===
Bartley made his debut with United Soccer League side New York Red Bulls II on 13 July 2017, as a 79th-minute substitute in a 2–0 loss to Harrisburg City Islanders.

Following stints at New York Cosmos B and MFK Vyškov in the Czech Republic, Bartley signed with USL League One side Forward Madison FC ahead of their inaugural season. He made his league debut for the club on April 6, 2019, coming on as a 71st-minute substitute for Jiro Toyama in a 1–0 away defeat to Chattanooga Red Wolves SC.

=== International ===
Bartley featured for the Jamaica U17 national team in 2015.

== Personal ==
Bartley was born in New York City, but both his parents are from Jamaica and lived on the island for three years.
