= Juliano (footballer, born 1998) =

Brazilian footballer

Personal information
- Full name: Juliano Marlon Chade
- Date of birth: 14 March 1998 (age 28)
- Place of birth: Prudentópolis, Brazil
- Height: 1.86 m (6 ft 1 in)
- Position: Goalkeeper

Team information
- Current team: Boa Esporte

Youth career
- Athletico Paranaense

Senior career*
Years	Team	Apps	(Gls)
2018–2020	Athletico Paranaense	0	(0)
2018	→ Cianorte (loan)	0	(0)
2019	→ Orlando City B (loan)	17	(0)
2020–	Boa Esporte	0	(0)

International career^{‡}
2015	Brazil U17	11	(0)
- * Club domestic league appearances and goals as of 5 October 2019 ‡ National team caps and goals as of 9 May 2019

Juliano Marlon Chade (born 14 March 1998), simply known as Juliano, is a Brazilian footballer who plays as a goalkeeper for Boa Esporte.
