= Wyatt Omsberg =

American soccer player (born 1995)

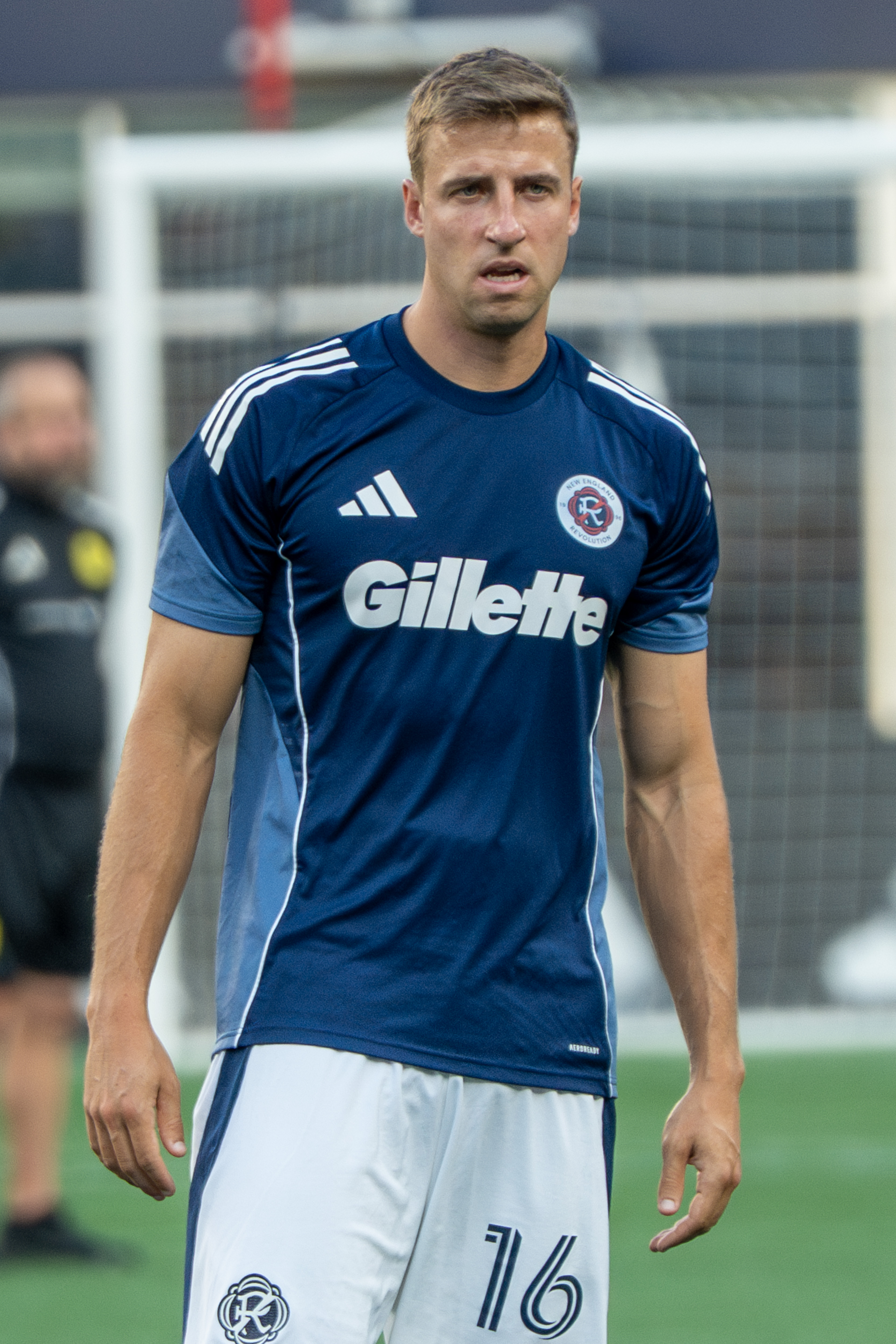
- Omsberg in 2025

Personal information
- Full name: Wyatt Omsberg
- Date of birth: September 21, 1995 (age 31)
- Place of birth: Belgrade, Maine, U.S.
- Height: 6 ft 4 in (1.93 m)
- Position: Defender

College career
Years	Team	Apps	(Gls)
2014–2017	Dartmouth Big Green	73	(10)

Senior career*
Years	Team	Apps	(Gls)
2016	GPS Portland Phoenix	4	(0)
2017	Seacoast United Phantoms	7	(1)
2018–2020	Minnesota United	7	(0)
2018	→ Tulsa Roughnecks (loan)	4	(0)
2019	→ Forward Madison (loan)	15	(0)
2020–2024	Chicago Fire	60	(1)
2023–2024	→ Chicago Fire II (loan)	8	(0)
2025	New England Revolution	7	(0)
- * Club domestic league appearances and goals as of July 20, 2025

Wyatt Omsberg (born September 21, 1995) is an American former professional soccer player who played as a defender.

== Career ==
=== Youth and college ===
Omsberg grew up in Scarborough, Maine and played soccer at Scarborough High School, where he helped lead the Red Storm to a Class "A" State Championship in 2012 and 2013. In 2014, he was named the Maine Gatorade Player of the Year for scoring 19 goals and 12 assists as a senior.

Omsberg attended Dartmouth College, where he played college soccer as a center-back for the Big Green from 2014 to 2017, tallying a total of 10 goals and 3 assists in 73 appearances. During his time at Dartmouth, Omsberg was a four-time Ivy League Champion, a two-time Ivy League Defensive Player of the Year, and a three-time First Team All-Ivy honoree. In addition, he won Dartmouth's biggest BB award his senior year.

While in college, he played in the PDL with GPS Portland Phoenix and the Seacoast United Phantoms.

=== Minnesota United ===
On January 19, 2018, Omsberg was drafted in the first round (15th overall) of the 2018 MLS SuperDraft, by Minnesota United FC. He became the first Ivy League player ever to be drafted in the first round of the MLS SuperDraft. He signed with the club on February 28, 2018.

Omsberg made his professional debut on March 24, 2018, starting in a 3–0 loss to the New York Red Bulls.

On April 26, 2018, Omsberg joined USL side Tulsa Roughnecks on loan. He made his league debut for the club on April 28, 2018, in a 1–1 away draw with Sacramento Republic.

In April 2019, Omsberg was loaned out to Minnesota's USL League One affiliate Forward Madison ahead of their inaugural season. He made his league debut for the club on April 6, 2019, in a 1–0 away defeat to Chattanooga Red Wolves.

=== Chicago Fire ===
On February 11, 2020, Omsberg was traded by Minnesota United to the Chicago Fire in exchange for Raheem Edwards.

=== New England Revolution ===
In January 2025, Omsberg signed with the New England Revolution on a one-year contract with a club option for 2026. On November 25, the Revolution declined the option and announced that he had retired from professional soccer.

== Career statistics ==
As of November 11, 2020

Club	Season	League			Cup		Continental		Total	
Club	Season	Division	Apps	Goals	Apps	Goals	Apps	Goals	Apps	Goals
GPS Portland Phoenix	2016	USL PDL	4	0	—	—	—	—	4	0
Seacoast United Phantoms	2017	USL PDL	7	1	—	—	—	—	7	1
Minnesota United	2018	Major League Soccer	7	0	0	0	—	—	7	0
Minnesota United	2019	Major League Soccer	0	0	1	0	—	—	1	0
Minnesota United	Minnesota United Total		7	0	1	0	0	0	8	0
Tulsa Roughnecks (loan)	2018	United Soccer League	4	0	0	0	—	—	4	0
Forward Madison (loan)	2019	USL League One	15	0	0	0	—	—	15	0
Chicago Fire	2020	Major League Soccer	5	0	0	0	—	—	5	0
Career total			42	1	1	0	0	0	43	1

== Honors ==
Individual

- Ivy League Defensive Player of the Year: 2016, 2017
- NSCAA All-East Region First Team: 2015, 2016, 2017
- NSCAA Second Team All-American: 2017
- First Team All-Ivy: 2015, 2016, 2017
- Academic All-Ivy: 2017
- NSCAA Third Team All-American: 2016
- Ivy League Honorable Mention: 2014
