= Erik Virgen =

American soccer player

Personal information
- Date of birth: November 18, 1999 (age 26)
- Place of birth: Sandy, Utah, United States
- Height: 1.75 m (5 ft 9 in)
- Position: Midfielder

Youth career
- FC Tucson
- 2015–2017: Real Salt Lake

College career
Years	Team	Apps	(Gls)
2018	New Mexico Lobos	17	(0)

Senior career*
Years	Team	Apps	(Gls)
2017	FC Tucson	3	(0)
2019–2020	FC Tucson	28	(2)
- * Club domestic league appearances and goals as of April 19, 2021

Erik Virgen (born November 18, 1999) is an American professional soccer player who plays as a midfielder.

== Career ==
Virgen was born in Sandy, Utah, where he began playing soccer at age five, and moved to Tucson, Arizona, when he was 11. He joined the youth set-up of FC Tucson. Virgen then spent two years with the Real Salt Lake academy side before playing college soccer for the New Mexico Lobos in 2018. He also appeared for FC Tucson when the club participated in the USL PDL, making three appearances in 2017.

On May 18, 2019, Virgen signed his first professional contract with FC Tucson in USL League One. The next month, on June 8, Virgen made his competitive debut for the club in a League One match against the Richmond Kickers. He started and played the whole match as the match ended 0–0. He then scored his first professional goal on August 24 in a league match against Orlando City B. He scored FC Tucson's third goal in the 69th-minute as the club won 3–1.

== International ==
Virgen has been part of the United States U15 and United States U18 sides.

== Career statistics ==
As of October 17, 2019

Club	Season	League			Cup		Continental		Total	
Club	Season	Division	Apps	Goals	Apps	Goals	Apps	Goals	Apps	Goals
FC Tucson	2017	PDL	3	0	0	0	—	—	3	0
FC Tucson	2019	USL League One	16	1	0	0	—	—	16	1
Career total			19	1	0	0	0	0	19	1
