= Ryan Coulter =

Irish footballer

Personal information
- Date of birth: 8 February 1989 (age 37)
- Place of birth: London, England
- Position: Goalkeeper

Youth career
- –2009: Dundalk

College career
Years	Team	Apps	(Gls)
2009–2010	San Diego Toreros	1	(0)
2011–2013	East Tennessee State Buccaneers	61	(0)

Senior career*
Years	Team	Apps	(Gls)
2009	Dundalk	1	(0)
2014	Athlone Town	15	(0)
2015	Sligo Rovers	7	(0)
2016	Athlone Town	3	(0)
2016	Longford Town	12	(0)
2017	Drogheda United	1	(0)
2017	Bray Wanderers	0	(0)
2018–2019	Emerald Force SC	7	(0)
2019	Forward Madison	7	(0)
2020	Rio Grande Valley FC	1	(0)

Managerial career
- 2018: UCF Knights (goalkeeper coach)
- 2019: Forward Madison (goalkeeper coach)
- 2020: Rio Grande Valley FC (goalkeeper coach)
- 2021: Houston Dynamo (academy coach)
- 2022–: FC Cincinnati 2 (goalkeeper coach)
- * Club domestic league appearances and goals as of 5 October 2020

Ryan Coulter (born 8 February 1989) is an Irish footballer who is a goalkeeper coach for MLS Next Pro team FC Cincinnati 2, the reserve team of Major League Soccer's FC Cincinnati.

== Career ==
=== Youth and early career ===
Coulter was a member of the St Joseph's Boys FC in Sallynoggin, where he played all through the underage structure before signing with Dundalk U-20 side in 2008 He made his debut in the League of Ireland Premier Division on 10 April 2009, starting in the home match against Bray Wanderers, which finished as a 1–1 draw.

=== College career in the United States ===
In mid-2009, he moved to the United States to attend college. He began at the University of San Diego, and made one appearance for the Toreros men's team in two seasons. In 2011, he joined East Tennessee State University and made 61 appearances for the Buccaneers before graduating in 2014.

Coulter impressed in his time at ETSU, captaining the side to a conference championship and national ranking in 2013. He broke a long-standing clean sheet record in the Atlantic Sun Conference set by Jeff Cassar. In 2013, Coulter was voted Atlantic Sun Conference Goalkeeper of the Year and in the Atlantic Sun Team of the Year. Upon graduation, Coulter was selected to the NSCAA All-South Region First Team.

=== Return to Ireland ===
Upon graduation, he returned to Ireland to join Athlone Town, making 15 league appearances in 2014. He moved to Sligo Rovers in 2015, before returning to Athlone Town the following season. Later in 2016 he joined Longford Town, before moving to Drogheda United in 2017, where he made one appearance for the club. Following this, he joined Bray Wanderers, but did not appear for the club.

=== Emerald Force SC ===
In 2018, he returned to the United States to join Emerald Force SC in the NPSL. He made seven appearances for the club during the season.

=== Forward Madison FC ===
On 20 February 2019, Coulter joined Forward Madison FC in USL League One as a player-coach for the team's inaugural season. Having earned a UEFA Goalkeeping B License, he also served as the goalkeeping coach for the club. He made his competitive debut for the club on 13 April 2019 in a 1–0 defeat to North Texas SC.

In the first win in club history, Coulter made numerous saves, including the USL League One Save of the Week and was selected for the USL Team of the Week.

=== Rio Grande Valley FC ===
Coulter joined USL Championship side Rio Grande Valley FC in March 2020, serving as a player and the club's goalkeeping coach.

== Personal life ==
Coulter was born in London, England, though he was raised in the Irish town of Bray. He is a son of the singer Phil Coulter.
