= Carl Schneider (soccer) =

American soccer player (born 1992)

Personal information
- Date of birth: November 19, 1992 (age 33)
- Place of birth: Madison, Wisconsin, U.S.
- Height: 5 ft 9 in (1.75 m)
- Position: Defender

Youth career
- 2006–2007: Mequon United
- 2002–2010: Madison 56ers
- 2007–2010: La Follette Lancers

College career
Years	Team	Apps	(Gls)
2012–2015	Wisconsin Badgers	61	(2)

Senior career*
Years	Team	Apps	(Gls)
2011–2014	Madison 56ers	6+	(1+)
2015	Des Moines Menace	6	(0)
2016–2019	IFK Åmål	40+	(2+)
2019–2020	Forward Madison	11	(0)
2021	Michigan Stars	24	(0)
2022	Forward Madison	1	(0)
- * Club domestic league appearances and goals as of January 18, 2023

Carl Schneider (born November 19, 1992) is an American retired soccer player who played as a defender.

== Career ==
=== Youth and college career ===
Schneider began his youth career with Madison 56ers, while also appearing for Mequon United in the Super Y League from 2006 to 2007. During high school, he appeared for the La Follette Lancers, where he was named Wisconsin State Journal Player of the Year and second team all-state as a senior after leading the team to their first Big Eight Conference title. In 2012, Schneider joined the Wisconsin Badgers, making 61 appearances and scoring 2 goals for the team.

=== Early club career ===
Between 2011 and 2014, Schneider appeared for the Madison 56ers senior team in the NPSL. He also appeared for the team in the 2013 U.S. Open Cup.

In 2015, he joined Des Moines Menace in the PDL. He made six league appearances for the team, while also appearing in the second round of the 2015 U.S. Open Cup.

=== Move to Sweden ===
In 2016, Schneider trained with Bridges FC and participated on their European tour. He was noticed by IFK Åmål in the Swedish sixth-division, the Division 4 Bohuslän/Dalsland, and signed with the team in July 2016. He helped the team gain promotion to Division 3. In subsequent seasons, he made 40 league appearances, scoring 2 goals, and also appeared in the 2018–19 Svenska Cupen. In 2018 he helped the team gain promotion to Division 2 of Swedish football.

=== Forward Madison ===
In 2019, Schneider returned to the United States after signing with hometown club Forward Madison FC for their inaugural season, competing in USL League One. He became the first Madison native to sign with the team. He made his league debut for the club on April 13, 2019, in a 1–0 away defeat to North Texas SC.

=== Michigan Stars ===
On April 6, 2021, Schneider joined National Independent Soccer Association side Michigan Stars FC.

=== Return to Forward Madison ===
On March 28, 2022, Schneider returned to Forward Madison. Schneider appeared in one game in his return for the club, starting in a 3–0 victory over Cleveland SC in the second round of the 2022 U.S. Open Cup.

=== Retirement ===
Schneider announced his retirement from professional soccer on a podcast following the 2022 season.

== Personal life ==
Schneider was born in Madison, Wisconsin.
