= Lucas Coutinho =

Brazilian football player (born 1993)

Personal information
- Date of birth: 12 August 1993 (age 33)
- Place of birth: Recife, Brazil
- Height: 1.75 m (5 ft 9 in)
- Position: Midfielder

College career
Years	Team	Apps	(Gls)
2013–2016	Palm Beach Atlantic Sailfish	64	(25)

Senior career*
Years	Team	Apps	(Gls)
2013	Ocala Stampede	2	(0)
2015	SWV King's Warriors	8	(2)
2016	South Florida Surf	13	(3)
2017–2018	Florida Tropics SC (indoor)	20	(10)
2018	Lakeland Tropics	11	(1)
2019–2020	South Georgia Tormenta	25	(3)
2021	FC Tulsa	18	(2)
2022–2023	Greenville Triumph	56	(6)
2024	Chattanooga Red Wolves	15	(1)
- * Club domestic league appearances and goals as of November 22, 2024

Lucas Coutinho (born 12 August 1993) is a Brazilian footballer who plays as a midfielder.
