= Carlos Gómez (footballer, born 1994) =

Spanish association football player

Personal information
- Date of birth: 21 February 1994 (age 32)
- Place of birth: Madrid, Spain
- Height: 1.75 m (5 ft 9 in)
- Position: Midfielder

College career
Years	Team	Apps	(Gls)
2016–2018	Young Harris Mountain Lions	54	(32)

Senior career*
Years	Team	Apps	(Gls)
2017	South Georgia Tormenta	1	(0)
2019–2020	Greenville Triumph	36	(7)
2021	Forward Madison	17	(0)
- * Club domestic league appearances and goals as of 31 October 2021

Carlos Gómez (born 21 February 1994) is a Spanish footballer who currently plays as a midfielder.
