= Ronaldo Damus =

Haitian footballer (born 1999)

Personal information
- Date of birth: 12 September 1999 (age 27)
- Place of birth: Hinche, Haiti
- Height: 1.80 m (5 ft 11 in)
- Position: Forward

Team information
- Current team: Birmingham Legion
- Number: 9

Youth career
- 2018: FC Dallas

Senior career*
Years	Team	Apps	(Gls)
2015–2018	Real Hope FA		
2019–2020	North Texas SC	35	(21)
2021–2022	Orange County SC	31	(18)
2022–2025	GIF Sundsvall	22	(5)
2023	→ San Diego Loyal (loan)	32	(15)
2024	→ Colorado Springs Switchbacks (loan)	32	(12)
2025	→ Birmingham Legion (loan)	30	(11)
2026–	Birmingham Legion	27	(7)

International career^{‡}
2018	Haiti U20	8	(0)
2018	Haiti U21	5	(2)
2016–	Haiti	7	(0)
- * Club domestic league appearances and goals as of 31 October 2026 ‡ National team caps and goals as of 23 February 2023

Ronaldo Damus (born 12 September 1999) is a Haitian footballer who plays as a forward for USL Championship club Birmingham Legion and the Haiti national team.

== Career ==
=== Club ===
Damus has played in the USL League One for North Texas SC. Damus signed for USL Championship club Orange County SC ahead of the 2021 season. On March 17, 2022, Orange County announced that they had transferred Damus to Allsvenskan club GIF Sundsvall.

In 2024 with Colorado Springs Switchbacks, Damus led the team in goals en route to winning the 2024 USL Championship Final. In December 2024, it was announced that Sundsvall would be loaning Damus to Birmingham Legion in the USL Championship's Eastern Conference for the 2025 season.

In January 2026, Birmingham Legion announced they had signed Damus for the 2026 season.

=== International ===
Damus has played internationally for Haiti at the youth and senior levels.

== Honors ==
North Texas

- USL Regular Season Champions: 2019
- USL League One Playoff Champions: 2019

Orange County

- USL Cup: 2021

Colorado Springs

- USL Cup: 2024

Individual

- USL League One Golden Boot: 2019
- USL League One All-League First Team: 2019
- USL Cup Final MVP: 2021
