= Josiel Núñez =

Panamanian footballer (born 1993)

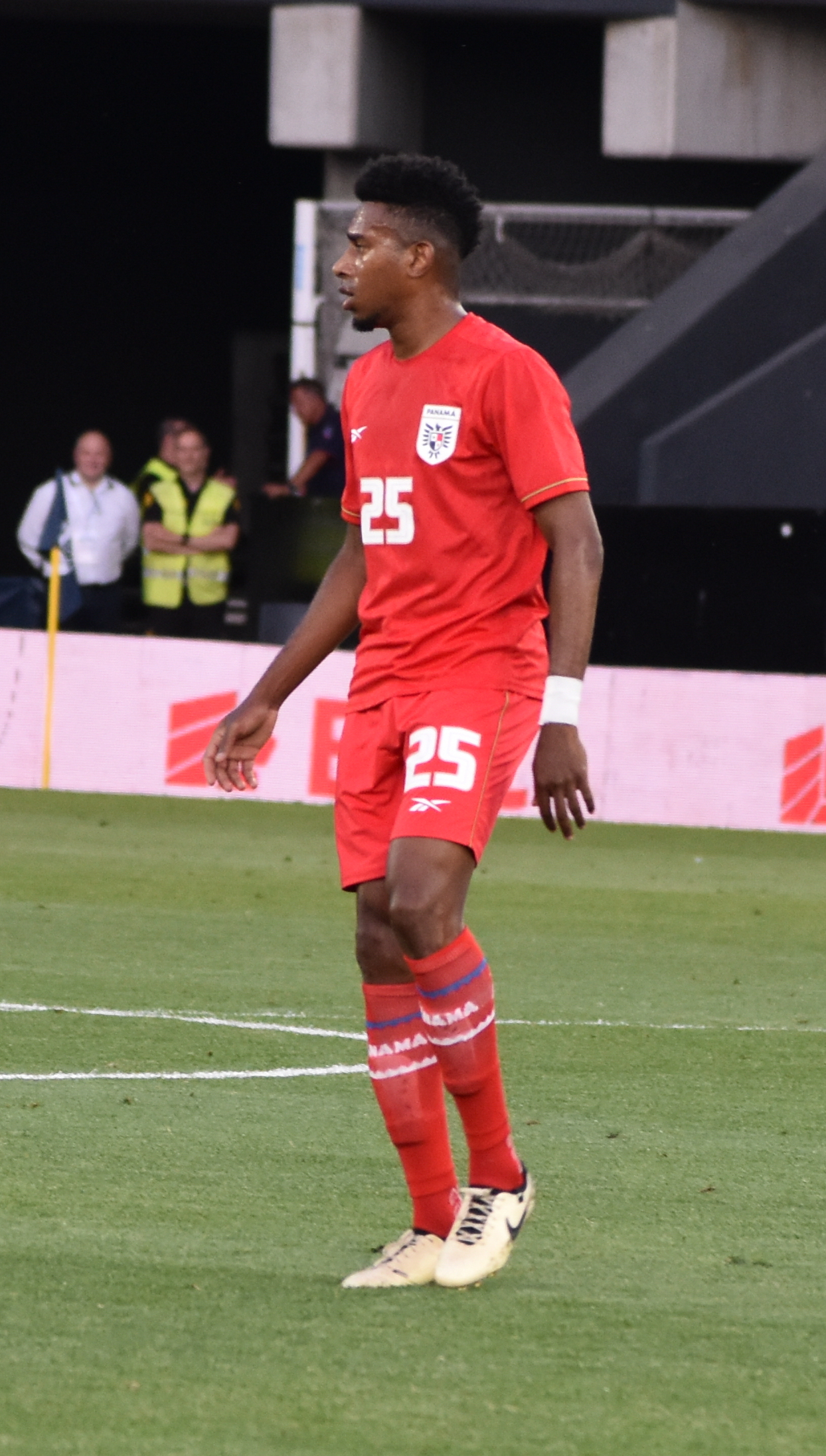

Personal information
- Full name: Josiel Alberto Núñez Rivera
- Date of birth: 29 January 1993 (age 33)
- Place of birth: Panama City, Panama
- Height: 1.81 m (5 ft 11 in)
- Position: Midfielder

Team information
- Current team: Intercity
- Number: 12

Senior career*
| Years | Team | Apps | (Gls) |
| 2012–2016 | Plaza Amador | 104 | (12) |
| 2016–2017 | Atlético Venezuela | 18 | (0) |
| 2017 | Plaza Amador | 13 | (4) |
| 2017–2018 | Árabe Unido | 31 | (6) |
| 2018–2020 | Universitario | 19 | (1) |
| 2019 | → Forward Madison (loan) | 23 | (3) |
| 2020–2022 | Intercity | 57 | (6) |
| 2022–2024 | Recreativo Huelva | 69 | (2) |
| 2024–2025 | Alcorcón | 24 | (1) |
| 2025 | Conquense | 15 | (0) |
| 2026– | Intercity | 16 | (0) |

International career
| 2013 | Panama U20 | 3 | (0) |
| 2015 | Panama U22 | 4 | (2) |
| 2014–2020 | Panama | 16 | (2) |
- * Club domestic league appearances and goals as of 16 May 2026

Josiel Alberto Núñez Rivera (born 29 January 1993) is a Panamanian professional footballer who plays as a midfielder for Spanish Segunda Federación club Intercity.

== Club career ==
In December 2018, Núñez was loaned out to USL League One side Forward Madison FC ahead of their inaugural season. He made his league debut for the club on April 6, 2019, in a 1–0 away defeat to Chattanooga Red Wolves SC. He scored his first league goal for the club on 19 April 2019, scoring in the 58th minute of Madison's first league win in club history, a 2–1 victory over Orlando City B. His goal, assisted by Paulo Junior, made the score 1-1. For the 2022–23 season, he signed for Recreativo de Huelva, which is competing in Spanish fourth-tier Segunda Federación.

On 28 June 2024, Núñez signed a two-season contract with Alcorcón in the Spanish third tier.

== International career ==
Núñez made his debut for Panama in an August 2014 friendly match against Peru.

=== International goals ===
Scores and results list Panama's goal tally first.

| No. | Date | Venue | Opponent | Score | Result | Competition |
|---|---|---|---|---|---|---|
| 1. | 15 January 2017 | Estadio Rommel Fernández, Panama City, Panama | Nicaragua | 2–0 | 2–1 | 2017 Copa Centroamericana |
| 2. | 17 April 2018 | Ato Boldon Stadium, Couva, Trinidad and Tobago | Trinidad and Tobago | 1–0 | 1–0 | Friendly |
