= Paul Clowes =

English footballer

Personal information
- Date of birth: 27 December 1993 (age 32)
- Place of birth: Cheshire, England
- Position: Midfielder

Youth career
- 1999–2012: Manchester City

College career
| Years | Team | Apps | (Gls) |
| 2012–2015 | Clemson Tigers | 86 | (4) |

Senior career*
| Years | Team | Apps | (Gls) |
| 2013–2014 | Orlando City U-23 | 17 | (2) |
| 2016 | D.C. United | 0 | (0) |
| 2016 | → Richmond Kickers (loan) | 1 | (0) |
| 2016 | Charlotte Independence | 15 | (0) |
| 2017 | Orlando City B | 16 | (1) |
| 2018 | Egerton | 7 | (2) |
| 2019–2020 | Greenville Triumph | 34 | (1) |
- * Club domestic league appearances and goals as of 25 October 2020

Paul Clowes (born 27 December 1993) is an English former footballer who played as a midfielder.

== Career ==
=== Youth and college ===
Born in Cheshire, Paul Clowes joined the Manchester City F.C. Reserves and Academy as a child, joining the academy at the age of six. Clowes worked his way up the Academy where he became a club apprentice in 2010, playing for the Manchester City Youth team. While an apprentice, Clowes joined and played for the U-21 team in the English Premier Reserve League. Additionally, Clowes played in the NextGen Series and the Youth Cup, against some of the top European academies.

Offered a professional contract, Clowes declined and opted to take a scholarship with Clemson University, where he joined the Clemson Tigers men's soccer program In four seasons at Clemson, Clowes played in 85 games, starting 81 of them, he scored four goals and added 10 assists playing as a holding midfielder. At Clemson, Clowes was named to the All-ACC second team in 2014 and to the first team in 2015. He was also named 2015 ACC Midfielder of the year. His collegiate career culminated with the Tigers reaching the 2015 NCAA Division I Men's Soccer Championship Game, where the Tigers ultimately lost to Stanford.

=== Professional ===
While in college, Clowes played two seasons in the PDL with Orlando City U-23, during the 2013 and 2014 seasons. Clowes was invited to the 2016 MLS Combine. Clowes was selected in the second round, 32nd overall by D.C. United in the 2016 MLS SuperDraft.

Clowes was signed by United and sent on loan to Richmond Kickers of the United Soccer League. Clowes made his professional debut on 26 March 2016 coming on in the final 24 minutes of a 3–1 win against Harrisburg City Islanders.

On 10 May 2016, Clowes was waived by D.C. United to make way for the signing of Alhaji Kamara.

Clowes signed with United Soccer League side Charlotte Independence on 1 June 2016.

On 6 December 2016 Clowes was signed by Orlando City B along with three other players.

After returning to England, Clowes played Egerton, a Cheshire League One (12th tier) club who have had other fellow former professional players such as Emile Heskey, Danny Webber, Emmerson Boyce and Nathan Ellington training with them. In the 2018–19 season, he made seven league appearances for the club, scoring twice.

Clowes returned to the United States on 22 January 2019, signing for third-tier club Greenville Triumph SC.

Since retiring from professional soccer, Clowes has enrolled in law school at the University of South Carolina School of Law in Columbia, South Carolina.
