= Brian Sylvestre =

Haitian soccer player (born 1992)

Personal information
- Full name: Brian Sylvestre
- Date of birth: 19 December 1992 (age 33)
- Place of birth: Hollywood, Florida, U.S.
- Height: 6 ft 5 in (1.96 m)
- Position: Goalkeeper

Youth career
- Fort Lauderdale Schulz Academy
- Weston FC
- 2008: IMG Soccer Academy
- 2009–2011: Vancouver Whitecaps FC

Senior career*
Years	Team	Apps	(Gls)
2011	Vancouver Whitecaps U23	5	(0)
2011–2012	Vancouver Whitecaps FC	0	(0)
2013–2014	Harrisburg City Islanders	3	(0)
2015–2017	North Carolina FC	48	(0)
2015	→ Philadelphia Union (loan)	12	(0)
2018	LA Galaxy	0	(0)
2018	LA Galaxy II	2	(0)
2019	Forward Madison	17	(0)
2020–2021	Miami FC	4	(0)

International career^{‡}
2011	United States U20	1	(0)
2021	Haiti	5	(0)

Managerial career
- 2022: USC Beaufort Sand Sharks (women's assistant)
- 2023–: Savannah Clovers (goalkeeping)
- * Club domestic league appearances and goals as of January 17, 2023 ‡ National team caps and goals as of January 17, 2023

Brian Sylvestre (born 19 December 1992) is a former professional footballer who played as a goalkeeper. Born in the United States, he represented the Haiti national team.

== Early life ==
Sylvestre was born in Hollywood, Florida, and is of Haitian descent.

== Career ==
=== Youth ===
Sylvestre attended Hollywood Hills High School, and began his youth career in Florida, playing for the Schulz Academy U-16 squad, Weston FC, and at the IMG Soccer Academy. Forgoing a college soccer career, Sylvestre signed for the Vancouver Whitecaps Residency program in February 2010. In March 2010, he started for the Residency team in the U-19 Super Group of Dallas Cup XXXI.

Sylvestre was part of the IMG Soccer Academy in Florida, before moving to the Vancouver Whitecaps FC Residency in 2009.

=== Professional ===
Sylvestre began the 2011 Major League Soccer pre-season with Vancouver Whitecaps FC. He was signed to the senior squad on 15 March 2011. He was released by the team on 8 November 2012, after two years and having appeared four times for its reserve team and five times for the U-23 professional development team, but without having played for the senior men's team.

Sylvestre joined USL Pro club Harrisburg City Islanders in 2013. He made his professional debut on 17 June 2014, in a US Open Cup game against Philadelphia Union.

On 6 February 2015, Sylvestre signed with NASL club Carolina RailHawks. On 7 May 2015, he was loaned to Philadelphia Union. While on loan with the Union he started 12 games and recorded 5 shutouts. He only appeared in one game for the RailHawks that season, a U.S. Open Cup loss to the Charlotte Independence. Sylvestre took over as the starting goalkeeper for the RailHawks in May 2016 and started 19 games for the club.

Prior to the 2017 NASL season, Sylvestre trained with Croatian First Football League side Istra 1961.

On 12 January 2018, Sylvestre signed with MLS club LA Galaxy. Sylvestre was released by LA Galaxy at the end of their 2018 season.

On 14 January 2019, Sylvestre became the first goalkeeper signed by USL League One expansion team Forward Madison FC.

Sylvestre was transferred to USL Championship team Miami FC on 23 January 2020, for an undisclosed fee. After being re-signed for 2021, he was not brought back for a third season and departed after only playing in four matches.

=== International ===
Sylvestre was called up to the United States U-20 national team in January 2011 and again in May 2011 for a mini-camp in Vichy, France. Sylvestre started in a 2–1 loss against the French U-20 squad on 19 May 2011. Sylvestre accepted a call-up to Haiti's senior squad for 2021 CONCACAF Gold Cup qualification and was cap-tied to Haiti upon his start in their second match, against Bermuda.

=== Coaching ===
Sylvestre began coaching in 2022, joining the USC Beaufort women's team as an assistant. In January 2023, Sylvestre joined the technical staff of Savannah Clovers FC ahead of their inaugural season in the National Independent Soccer Association.
