= Conner Antley =

American soccer player (born 1995)

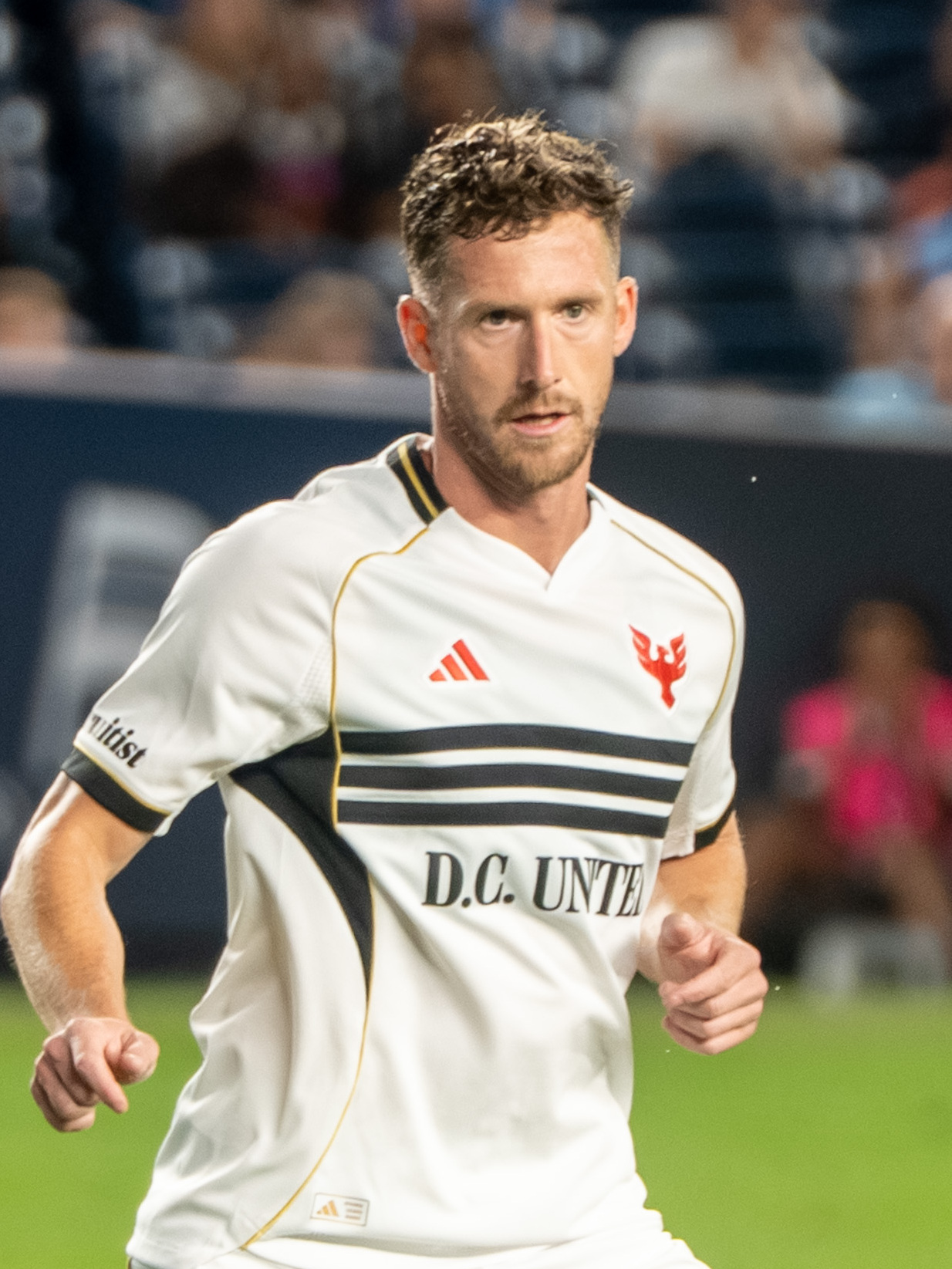
- Antley with DC United in 2025

Personal information
- Full name: William Conner Antley
- Date of birth: March 22, 1995 (age 31)
- Place of birth: Atlanta, Georgia, U.S.
- Height: 1.85 m (6 ft 1 in)
- Position: Defender

Team information
- Current team: D.C. United
- Number: 12

College career
Years	Team	Apps	(Gls)
2014–2017	Mercer Bears	49	(8)

Senior career*
Years	Team	Apps	(Gls)
2017	Seattle Sounders FC U-23	10	(1)
2018–2019	South Georgia Tormenta	36	(8)
2020	Indy Eleven	12	(0)
2021–2023	Tampa Bay Rowdies	91	(0)
2024–	D.C. United	31	(1)
2026	→ Tampa Bay Rowdies (loan)	3	(1)
- * Club domestic league appearances and goals as of September 15, 2026

William Conner Antley (born March 22, 1995) is an American professional soccer player who plays as a defender for D.C. United in Major League Soccer. His brother, Ian Antley, is also a professional player.

== Career ==
=== College and amateur teams ===
After a standout career with his high school team, East Coweta, Antley played in college for the Mercer Bears. Over the course of his career with Mercer, Antley played in 49 matches, starting 46 of those games, and scored 8 goals and assisted 6 more goals, despite being a defender.

Before his professional career began, Antley played for two USL League Two sides. He began his amateur career with Seattle Sounders FC U-23 team in 2017 where his play gained him recognition as a top 50 player in the league. However, in 2018 he moved to Tormenta FC and played for the team, before they moved to USL League One and transitioned their USL League Two team to Tormenta 2.

=== South Georgia Tormenta ===
Due to his strong form for the team before their move to the professional ranks, Tormenta FC signed Antley to a professional contract on June 11, 2018. Antley made his debut for Tormenta in USL League One's inaugural match against the Greenville Triumph, even scoring a goal. Throughout the season Antley played in 27 matches for Tormenta, scoring 6 goals and making 6 assists for the club. Due to Antley's stellar play throughout the season, Antley was named the 2019 USL League One Defender of the Year on October 29, 2019.

=== Indy Eleven ===
On November 21, 2019, Antley joined USL Championship side Indy Eleven. Notably this was the first transfer between the USL Championship and USL League One where a transfer fee was paid between the clubs for the player. Despite the historic nature of the transfer, the fee was undisclosed.

=== Tampa Bay Rowdies ===
On December 29, 2020, Antley signed with USL Championship side Tampa Bay Rowdies ahead of their 2021 season.

=== D.C. United ===
Ahead of the 2024 season, United signed an undisclosed fee to the Rowdies to sign him. Antley's maiden Major League Soccer season ended prematurely after he suffered an ACL tear in May.

=== Tampa Bay Rowdies ===
In August, 2026 Tampa Bay Rowdies acquired Antley on a short term loan from United. He was recalled by D.C. United in September, 2026.

== Honors ==
Individual

- USL League One Defender of the Year: 2019
