= Jiro Barriga =

Panamanian footballer (born 1995)

Personal information
- Full name: Jiro Barriga Toyama
- Date of birth: 28 April 1995 (age 31)
- Place of birth: Panama City, Panama
- Height: 1.79 m (5 ft 10 in)
- Position: Midfielder

Youth career
- –2013: JEF United Chiba

College career
Years	Team	Apps	(Gls)
2014–2015	Barton Cougars	25	(7)
2016–2017	Florida Gulf Coast Eagles	31	(2)

Senior career*
Years	Team	Apps	(Gls)
2014–2015	Brooklyn Italians		
2016	FC Wichita	2	(1)
2017	K–W United FC	10	(0)
2018	Laredo Heat	1	(0)
2019–2021	Forward Madison	59	(1)
2022	Monterey Bay	11	(0)
- * Club domestic league appearances and goals as of 22:38, 21 October 2022 (UTC)

Jiro Barriga Toyama (バリガ 外山 ジロ, Bariga Toyama Jiro; born 28 April 1995) is a Panamanian footballer who plays as a midfielder.

== Career ==
=== Youth and college career ===
In his youth, Barriga played for Chiba Prefectural Oihama High School, and was a member of the youth academy of JEF United Chiba until 2013. In 2014, he was selected to be one of the 28 finalists of the "Nike Chance" Japan round. He moved to the United States to attend Barton Community College, making 25 appearances and scoring 7 goals in two seasons for the Cougars. In 2015, he transferred to Florida Gulf Coast University, where he played for the Eagles until 2016, scoring twice in 31 appearances.

=== Amateur clubs ===
Barriga appeared for the Brooklyn Italians between 2014 and 2015, and managed to score a goal in the 2014 U.S. Open Cup against Jersey Express S.C. In 2016, he made two appearances and scored a goal for FC Wichita in the NPSL. In 2017, he made ten appearances in the PDL for K–W United FC. He returned to the NPSL in 2018, making one appearance for Laredo Heat.

=== Forward Madison FC ===
After graduating in 2018, Barriga joined Minnesota United FC on trial during the 2019 pre-season. On 29 January, he scored a hat-trick in a friendly against FC Tucson. Minnesota United opted not to sign him, though he was noticed by the club's affiliate Forward Madison FC. On 5 March 2019, he signed with Madison, joining the club's inaugural season in USL League One.

=== Monterey Bay FC ===
On 1 March 2022, Barriga made the move to USL Championship side Monterey Bay. His contract option was declined by the club at the end of the season.

== Personal life ==
Barriga was born in Panama City, Panama, to a Colombian father and Japanese mother. He moved to Japan at the age of 2.
