= Alfusainey Jatta =

Gambian footballer

Personal information
- Date of birth: 5 August 1999 (age 27)
- Place of birth: Abuko, Gambia
- Height: 1.88 m (6 ft 2 in)
- Position: Midfielder

Team information
- Current team: RFS
- Number: 6

Youth career
- Gamtel FC

Senior career*
Years	Team	Apps	(Gls)
2017–2018	Fortune FC		
2018–2020	MFK Vyškov	0	(0)
2019	→ North Texas SC (loan)	27	(0)
2020–2021	Pinzgau Saalfelden	11	(3)
2021–	RFS	32	(4)

International career
2017–2018	Gambia U20		
- * Club domestic league appearances and goals as of 17 April 2023

Alfusainey Jatta (born 5 August 1999) is a Gambian professional footballer who plays as a midfielder for Latvian football club RFS, which competes in the top-tier Virslīga.
