= Christian Díaz (Mexican footballer) =

Mexican footballer (born 1991)

Personal information
- Full name: Christian Antonio Díaz Domínguez
- Date of birth: 7 April 1991 (age 35)
- Place of birth: Guadalajara, Jalisco, Mexico
- Height: 1.73 m (5 ft 8 in)
- Positions: Defender; midfielder

Youth career
- Atlas

Senior career*
Years	Team	Apps	(Gls)
2009–2014	Atlas	7	(1)
2013	→ Leones Negros (loan)	16	(1)
2014–2016	Leones Negros	16	(0)
2016	Atlas Premier	6	(0)
2016–2017	Tlaxcala	24	(1)
2019–2021	Forward Madison	61	(2)
- * Club domestic league appearances and goals as of 18 January 2023

Christian Antonio Díaz Domínguez (born 7 April 1991), known as Christian Díaz, is a Mexican professional footballer who most recently played for USL League One side Forward Madison.
