= Paulo Jr. (footballer) =

Brazilian footballer

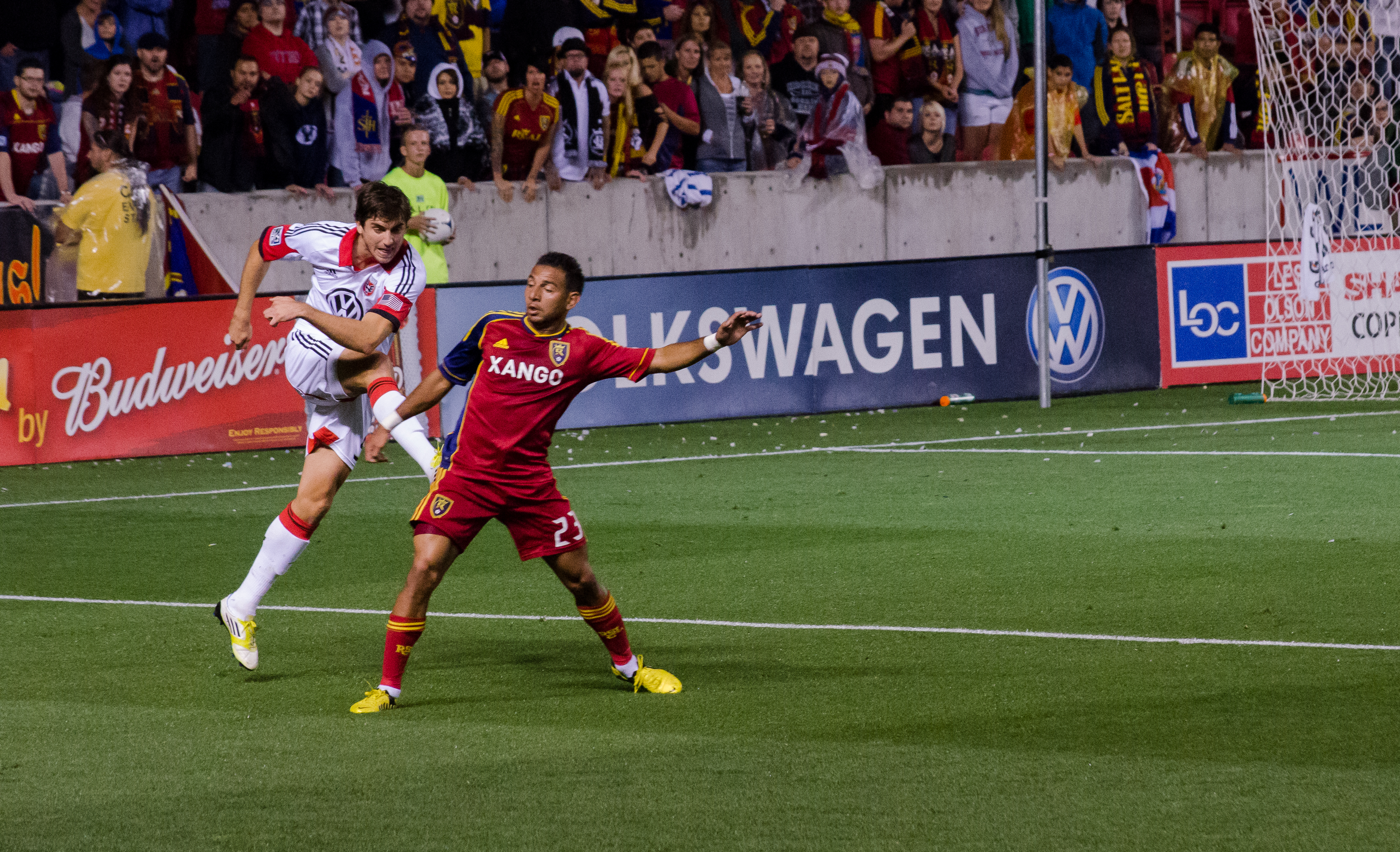

Personal information
- Full name: Paulo Morais de Araújo Júnior
- Date of birth: January 23, 1989 (age 37)
- Place of birth: Teresina, Piauí, Brazil
- Height: 5 ft 6 in (1.68 m)
- Position: Forward

Youth career
- 2006–2007: Flamengo-PI
- 2008: Ituano

Senior career*
Years	Team	Apps	(Gls)
2008	Ituano	4	(0)
2009–2011	Fort Lauderdale Strikers	38	(11)
2010–2011	→ Real Salt Lake (loan)	14	(2)
2012	Real Salt Lake	22	(2)
2012	→ Fort Lauderdale Strikers (loan)	3	(1)
2013	Vancouver Whitecaps FC	0	(0)
2013	Fort Lauderdale Strikers	12	(0)
2014	Náutico	15	(0)
2015–2016	Ottawa Fury	37	(5)
2015	→ Ottawa Fury FC Academy (loan)	1	(0)
2016	Fort Lauderdale Strikers	20	(3)
2017	Indy Eleven	9	(0)
2018	Penn FC	18	(4)
2019–2020	Forward Madison	43	(8)
Total		236	(36)
- * Club domestic league appearances and goals

Paulo Morais de Araújo Júnior (born 23 January 1989) is a Brazilian former footballer who played as a forward.

== Career ==
=== Brazil ===
Araujo was a member of the youth sides at Flamengo do Piaui and Ituano and began his professional career with Ituano in the Campeonato Brasileiro Série C in 2008.

=== United States ===
Araujo signed with Miami FC in early 2009. After receiving his work visa in May 2009, Araujo made his debut for Miami on May 20, 2009, in a game against Charleston Battery. He scored his first career professional goal on June 20, 2009, in a game against Cleveland City Stars. On March 15, 2010 Miami announced the re-signing of Araujo to a new contract for the 2010 season.

On September 9, 2010, having enjoyed a successful season with Miami FC in the USSF Division 2 Professional League, Araujo was loaned to Real Salt Lake for the final few months of the 2010 Major League Soccer season. Araujo scored his first goal for Salt Lake on September 15, 2010 in a 4–1 win over Toronto FC in the CONCACAF Champions League. He scored a brace (2 goals) in the final match of CONCACAF Champions League group-stage tournament play in Rio Tinto Stadium against Mexican giants, Cruz Azul.

Having enjoyed a successful initial loan spell, RSL extended the loan on December 27, 2010 through the 2011 MLS season. The extension also provided RSL the option to purchase Araujo and sign him through the 2014 season. The club exercised its purchase option in February 2012 and promptly signed Araujo through 2014.

Paulo Jr. was released by Salt Lake on December 3, 2012. He elected to participate in the 2012 MLS Re-Entry Draft and was selected by Vancouver Whitecaps FC in stage two of the draft on December 14, 2012. He signed with Vancouver on January 23, 2013 and was waived on April 17 having not played any league or national cup matches for the team.

On August 8, 2013 the Fort Lauderdale Strikers announced that Paulo Jr. had joined the club.

On September 8, 2017, Indy Eleven announced that Paulo Jr. signed with the team.

On June 19, 2018, Paulo Jr. signed with United Soccer League side Penn FC.

Paulo Jr. signed with Forward Madison FC ahead of their 2019 season. He scored eight goals in two seasons with the team, earning a spot on the USL League One All-League Second Team in 2019. He would retire at the end of the 2020 season.
