= 2020 Orlando City B season =

Orlando City B
2020 season
- Manager: Marcelo Neveleff
- Stadium: Osceola County Stadium
- USL League One: 11th
- Playoffs: DNQ
- Biggest win: ORL 2–0 NE (August 7)
- Biggest defeat: ORL 1–4 TUC (August 18); ORL 1–4 GVL (October 24)
Home colors

The 2020 Orlando City B season was the club's fourth season of existence and their second since returning from hiatus during the 2018 season. It was their second season as a founding member of USL League One, the third tier of the United States soccer pyramid, after moving from the second tier (USL Championship) in the restructuring. The team also moved from Montverde Academy where they spent the 2019 season, to the newly refurbished Osceola County Stadium at Orlando City's new training complex in Kissimmee, Florida.

On March 12 it was announced that the start of the 2020 USL League One season would be delayed as the league was temporarily suspended for 30 days on the advice of public health authorities due to the coronavirus pandemic. OCB's season eventually began on August 1, 127 days after originally scheduled. All home games were played behind closed doors.

It was the team's last season in USL League One, announcing on October 16 that it was withdrawing from USL1 at the end of the season in lieu of a new proposed MLS reserve league launching in 2021. On October 29, nine players were released as part of the end of season roster decisions, notably cutting a number of the older players in preparation for the shift in age group.

== Roster ==
As of September 3, 2020

No.	Nationality	Name	Position(s)	Date of birth (age)	Previous club	Notes
Goalkeepers
31	(United States)	Mason Stajduhar	GK	December 2, 1997 (aged 22)	(United States) Orlando City SC	First team
41	(Venezuela)	Javier Otero	GK	November 18, 2002 (aged 17)	(United States) Orlando City Development Academy	Academy
51	(United States)	Russell Robles	GK	October 10, 2003 (aged 16)	(United States) Orlando City Development Academy	Academy
61	(United States)	Austin Aviza	GK	February 17, 1997 (aged 23)	(United States) Providence Friars	–
Defenders
26	(United States)	Michael Halliday	DF	January 22, 2003 (aged 17)	(United States) Orlando City Development Academy	Academy
47	(Ecuador)	Franklin Carabalí	DF	June 27, 1996 (aged 24)	(Ecuador) América de Quito	–
50	(United States)	Owen Guske	DF	February 18, 2002 (aged 18)	(United States) Orlando City Development Academy	Academy
55	(United States)	Juan Pablo Monticelli	DF	August 26, 1997 (aged 22)	(Mexico) Tijuana	–
63	(Colombia)	Mateo Rodas	DF	January 11, 1998 (aged 22)	(Colombia) Tigres	–
64	(United States)	Jonathan Rosales	DF	May 22, 1998 (aged 22)	(United States) South Florida Bulls	–
65	(Puerto Rico)	Daniel Rosario	DF	April 10, 2002 (aged 18)	(United States) Orlando City Development Academy	Academy
68	(United States)	Thomas Williams	DF	August 15, 2004 (aged 15)	(United States) Orlando City Development Academy	Academy
72	(United States)	Nick O'Callaghan	DF	March 11, 1997 (aged 23)	(United States) FIU Panthers	–
Midfielders
33	(United States)	Jordan Bender	MF	July 9, 2001 (aged 19)	(United States) Orlando City SC	First team
34	(Jamaica)	Joey DeZart	MF	June 9, 1998 (aged 22)	(United States) Orlando City SC	First team
45	(United States)	Raul Aguilera	MF	August 2, 1999 (aged 20)	(United States) North Carolina Tar Heels	–
46	(United States)	Austin Amer	MF	February 17, 2000 (aged 20)	(United States) Orlando City Development Academy	–
56	(United States)	Theodore Ndje	MF	November 11, 2001 (aged 18)	(Argentina) Banfield	–
57	(United States)	Adam Ozeri	MF	March 7, 1998 (aged 22)	(Argentina) Ferro	Loan in
58	(Argentina)	Ignacio Poplawski	MF	March 15, 1998 (aged 22)	(Argentina) Estudiantes	Loan in
59	(Venezuela)	José Quintero	MF	July 27, 2001 (aged 19)	(United States) Orlando City Development Academy	Academy
67	(Venezuela)	Moises Tablante	MF	July 4, 2001 (aged 19)	(United States) Orlando City Development Academy	Academy
Forwards
48	(Brazil)	Fablo Dos Santos Oliveira	FW	February 15, 1999 (aged 21)	(Brazil) Barra da Tijuca	Loan in
49	(United States)	Aleksandar Gluvačević	FW	September 8, 1997 (aged 22)	(Serbia) OFK Vršac	–
53	(United States)	Julian Kennedy	FW	July 23, 2002 (aged 18)	(United States) Orlando City Development Academy	Academy
54	(United States)	Mason Lamb	FW	February 8, 2001 (aged 19)	(United States) Orlando City Development Academy	Academy
62	(Puerto Rico)	Wilfredo Rivera	FW	October 14, 2003 (aged 16)	(United States) Orlando City Development Academy	Academy
66	(Brazil)	Kenji Tanaka de Paula	FW	January 1, 2001 (aged 19)	(United States) Orlando City Development Academy	Academy

== Competitions ==
=== Friendlies ===
February 8	Orlando City B	1–1	USF Bulls	Sanford, Florida
		Report		Stadium: Sylvan Lake Park

February 22	Miami FC	2–0	Orlando City B	Miami, Florida
	Williams; Franco	Report		Stadium: Riccardo Silva Stadium

February 29	UCF Knights	2–2	Orlando City B	Orlando, Florida
		Report		Stadium: UCF Soccer and Track Stadium

March 7	Tormenta FC	Canceled	Orlando City B	Statesboro, Georgia
				Stadium: The Clubhouse Fields

March 14	Orlando City B	Canceled	(Canada) York9 FC	Orlando, Florida
		Report
Note: Canceled due to the COVID-19 pandemic

=== USL League One ===
All times in regular season on Eastern Daylight Time (UTC-04:00) except where otherwise noted.

For the 2020 season, USL League One expanded by a net total of two teams following the addition of Union Omaha, New England Revolution II and Fort Lauderdale CF while Lansing Ignite folded after only one season. Canadian club Toronto FC II were later forced to withdraw for the season due to COVID-19 public health restrictions. A shortened 16-game regular season, reduced from 28, was announced on July 17, 2020. Only the top two teams in the regular season will advance to the postseason for a one-off 2020 USL League One Final to be played the weekend following the conclusion of the regular season.

==== Results summary ====
Overall								Home						Away					
Pld	W	D	L	GF	GA	GD	Pts	W	D	L	GF	GA	GD	W	D	L	GF	GA	GD
15	1	3	11	10	29	−19	6	0	3	4	6	15	−9	1	0	7	4	14	−10

Last updated: October 24, 2020.
Source: USL

==== Results by round ====
Round	1	2	3	4	5	6	7	8	9	10	11	12	13	14	15
Stadium	A	A	H	H	A	H	H	A	A	H	A	A	A	H	H
Result	L	W	D	L	L	D	D	L	L	L	L	L	L	L	L
Position	10	4	6	9	11	10	10	10	10	11	11	11	11	11	11

Source: USL
A = Away; H = Home; W = Win; D = Draw; L = Loss

==== Match results ====
August 1 1	Tormenta FC	2–0	Orlando City B	Statesboro, Georgia
8:00pm	Skelton (yellow card) 6'; Obinwa (yellow card) 45+1'; Vinyals 56', 70'	Report	Tablante (yellow card) 41'; Rivera (yellow card) 44'	Stadium: Erk Russell Park; Attendance: 400; Referee: Joshua Belk

August 7 2	New England Revolution II	0–2	Orlando City B	Foxborough, Massachusetts
7:00pm	Shimazaki (yellow card) 29' (yellow-red card) 38'; Mendonca (yellow card) 87'	Report	Tablante (yellow card) 40'; Rivera 66'; Tanaka 90+1'	Stadium: Gillette Stadium; Attendance: Behind-closed-doors; Referee: Ernie Constantine

August 14 3	Orlando City B	1–1	Fort Lauderdale CF	Kissimmee, Florida
7:00pm	Rivera 22'; Aguilera (yellow card) 47'; Monticelli (yellow card) 67'; Ndje (yellow card) 76'; Tablante (yellow card) 90+3'	Report	Lopez-Espin 39'	Stadium: Osceola County Stadium; Attendance: Behind-closed-doors; Referee: Gabriele Giusti
Note: 2hr lightning delay during first half

August 18 4	Orlando City B	1–4	FC Tucson	Kissimmee, Florida
7:00pm	Rodas 18' (pen.); Kennedy (yellow card) 29'	Report	Liadi 6', 26'; Alarcón 21'; Adams 41'; Valenzuela (yellow card) 46'	Stadium: Osceola County Stadium; Attendance: Behind-closed-doors; Referee: Alyssa Nichols

August 23 5	Forward Madison	3–1	Orlando City B	Wauwatosa, Wisconsin
5:00pm	Leonard (yellow card) 6'; Lockaby 19'; Monticelli 55' (o.g.); Eaton 85'	Report	Aguilera (yellow card) 22'; Lamb 37'; Rodas (yellow card) 90+2'; Ozeri (yellow card) 90+4'	Stadium: Hart Park; Attendance: 540; Referee: Nabil Bensalah
Note: 1hr 45min lightning delay during second half

August 28 6	Orlando City B	1–1	Tormenta FC	Kissimmee, Florida
7:00pm	O'Callaghan (yellow card) 27'; Aguilera 63' (pen.); Tablante (yellow card) 87'	Report	Aviza 29' (o.g.); Phelps (yellow card) 49' (yellow-red card) 61'; Obinwa (yellow card) 85'	Stadium: Osceola County Stadium; Attendance: Behind-closed-doors; Referee: Johan Fredrik Roenning

September 3 7	Orlando City B	1–1	North Texas SC	Kissimmee, Florida
7:00pm	Monticelli (yellow card) 22'; Quintero 30'; Carabalí (yellow card) 60'; Rodas (yellow card) 77'; Ndje (yellow card) 81'	Report	Romero 24' (pen.); Che (yellow card) 49'; Rayo (yellow card) 70'	Stadium: Osceola County Stadium; Attendance: Behind-closed-doors; Referee: Natalie Simon

September 6 8	Union Omaha	1–0	Orlando City B	Papillion, Nebraska
8:00pm	Vanacore-Decker (yellow card) 35'; Conway 43'; Viader (yellow card) 81'	Report	Monticelli (yellow card) 28'; Lamb (yellow card) 45+4'; Carabalí (yellow card) 83'; Rosales (yellow card) 90+2'	Stadium: Werner Park; Attendance: 2,400; Referee: Matthew Corrigan

September 12 9	Fort Lauderdale CF	2–0	Orlando City B	Fort Lauderdale, Florida
8:00pm	Azcona 5', (yellow card) 53'; Makoun (yellow card) 31'; Lopez-Espin 51'	Report	Monticelli (yellow card) 7'; Carabalí (yellow card) 26' (yellow-red card) 77'; Aguilera (yellow card) 64'	Stadium: Inter Miami CF Stadium; Attendance: Behind-closed-doors; Referee: Natalie Simon

September 19	Richmond Kickers	P–P	Orlando City B	Richmond, Virginia
6:30pm				Stadium: City Stadium
Note: Postponed due to positive COVID-19 test Rescheduled on October 7.

September 26 10	Orlando City B	0–1	New England Revolution II	Kissimmee, Florida
11:00am	Rivera (yellow card) 38'; Williams (yellow card) 42'; Rodas (yellow card) 82'; Quintero (yellow card) 90+2'	Report	Rennicks 46'	Stadium: Osceola County Stadium; Attendance: Behind-closed-doors; Referee: Alex Billeter

October 2 11	Greenville Triumph	2–0	Orlando City B	Greenville, South Carolina
7:00pm	McLean 65'; Morrell 69'	Report	Rodas (yellow card) 74'	Stadium: Legacy Early College Field; Attendance: 1,010; Referee: Izlen Peksenar

October 7 12	Richmond Kickers	2–1	Orlando City B	Richmond, Virginia
6:30pm	Bolanos 27', 43' (pen.), (yellow card) 67'	Report	Tablante (yellow card) 35' (yellow-red card) 68'; Ndje (yellow card) 37'; Lamb (yellow card) 45+2'; Rosario (yellow card) 89'; Rivera 90+3'	Stadium: City Stadium; Attendance: 626; Referee: John Matto
Note: Rescheduled from September 19

October 10	Orlando City B	C–C	Chattanooga Red Wolves	Kissimmee, Florida
3:00pm				Stadium: Osceola County Stadium
Note: Postponed due to positive COVID-19 tests. Was not rescheduled.

October 17 13	FC Tucson	2–0	Orlando City B	Tucson, Arizona
10:30pm	Coan 45+3', 90'; Pena (yellow card) 83'	Report	Williams (yellow card) 57'; Rosales (yellow card) 88'	Stadium: Kino Sports Complex; Attendance: Behind-closed-doors; Referee: Kevin Sánchez

October 21 14	Orlando City B	1–3	Richmond Kickers	Kissimmee, Florida
11:00am	Tanaka 8'; Tablante (yellow card) 20'; Rosario (red card) 24'; Rodas (yellow card) 30'; Rosales (yellow card) 61'	Report	Bolduc (yellow card) 7'; Magalhães (yellow card) 16'; Mwape 36'; Alves 51'; Anderson 64'	Stadium: Osceola County Stadium; Attendance: Behind-closed-doors; Referee: Alyssa Nichols

October 24 15	Orlando City B	1–4	Greenville Triumph	Kissimmee, Florida
1:00pm	Rodas (yellow card) 41'; Amer (yellow card) 64'; Gluvačević 73'; Ndje (yellow card) 89'	Report	Morrell 11', 26'; Walker (yellow card) 45+3'; McLean 58'; Powell (yellow card) 80'; Booth 90+1'	Stadium: Osceola County Stadium; Attendance: Behind-closed-doors; Referee: Gabriele Giusti

==== Standings ====
Pos	Team	Pld	W	L	D	GF	GA	GD	Pts	PPG
7	Forward Madison FC	16	5	5	6	20	14	+6	21	1.31
8	Tormenta FC	16	5	7	4	19	22	−3	19	1.19
9	New England Revolution II (Note: Professional teams that are owned by teams playing in a higher division are ineligible for the U.S. Open Cup.)	16	5	8	3	19	26	−7	18	1.13
10	Fort Lauderdale CF	16	4	9	3	19	28	−9	15	0.94
11	Orlando City B	15	1	11	3	10	29	−19	6	0.40

Source: 2020 USL League One standings
Rules for classification: 1) points; 2) total wins; 3) total goal differential; 4) total goals scored; 5) points earned against top four Conference finishers; 6) disciplinary points; 7) coin toss or drawing of lots

=== U.S. Open Cup ===
Due to their ownership by a more advanced level professional club (Orlando City SC), Orlando City B is ineligible for the Cup competition.

== Squad statistics ==
=== Appearances ===
As of matches played October 24, 2020

No.	Pos.	Name	USL1	
No.	Pos.	Name	Apps	Starts
26	DF	(United States) Michael Halliday	7	6
31	GK	(United States) Mason Stajduhar	3	3
33	MF	(United States) Jordan Bender	3	3
34	MF	(Jamaica) Joey DeZart	2	2
41	GK	(Venezuela) Javier Otero	1	1
45	MF	(United States) Raul Aguilera	8	7
46	MF	(United States) Austin Amer	7	5
47	DF	(Ecuador) Franklin Carabalí	10	7
48	FW	(Brazil) Fablo Dos Santos	5	1
49	FW	(United States) Aleksandar Gluvačević	10	3
50	DF	(United States) Owen Guske	6	5
51	GK	(United States) Russell Robles	0	0
53	FW	(United States) Julian Kennedy	8	7
54	FW	(United States) Mason Lamb	7	5
55	DF	(United States) Juan Pablo Monticelli	14	11
56	MF	(United States) Theodore Ndje	9	2
57	MF	(United States) Adam Ozeri	12	4
58	MF	(Argentina) Ignacio Poplawski	0	0
59	MF	(Venezuela) José Quintero	12	11
60	DF	(Venezuela) Juan Ramos	0	0
61	GK	(United States) Austin Aviza	11	11
62	FW	(Puerto Rico) Wilfredo Rivera	15	15
63	DF	(Colombia) Mateo Rodas	12	9
64	DF	(United States) Jonathan Rosales	14	8
65	DF	(Puerto Rico) Daniel Rosario	7	3
66	FW	(Brazil) Kenji Tanaka	12	6
67	MF	(Venezuela) Moises Tablante	14	14
68	DF	(United States) Thomas Williams	13	10
72	DF	(United States) Nick O'Callaghan	6	6
73	DF	(United States) Jahlane Forbes	1	0

=== Goalscorers ===
As of matches played October 24, 2020

Rank	No.	Pos.	Name	USL1
1	62	FW	(Puerto Rico) Wilfredo Rivera	3
2	66	FW	(Brazil) Kenji Tanaka	2
3	45	MF	(United States) Raul Aguilera	1
3	49	FW	(United States) Aleksandar Gluvačević	1
3	54	FW	(United States) Mason Lamb	1
3	59	MF	(Venezuela) José Quintero	1
3	63	DF	(Colombia) Mateo Rodas	1
Total				10

=== Shutouts ===
As of matches played October 24, 2020

No.	Pos.	Name	USL1
1	61	(United States) Austin Aviza	1
Total			1

=== Disciplinary record ===
As of matches played October 24, 2020

No.	Pos.	Name	USL1	
No.	Pos.	Name	Booked	Sent off (straight red)
45	MF	(United States) Raul Aguilera	3	0
46	MF	(United States) Austin Amer	1	0
47	DF	(Ecuador) Franklin Carabalí	2	1
53	FW	(United States) Julian Kennedy	1	0
54	FW	(United States) Mason Lamb	2	0
55	DF	(United States) Juan Pablo Monticelli	4	0
56	MF	(United States) Theodore Ndje	4	0
57	MF	(United States) Adam Ozeri	1	0
59	MF	(Venezuela) José Quintero	1	0
62	FW	(Puerto Rico) Wilfredo Rivera	2	0
63	DF	(Colombia) Mateo Rodas	5	0
64	DF	(United States) Jonathan Rosales	4	0
65	DF	(Puerto Rico) Daniel Rosario	1	1
67	MF	(Venezuela) Moises Tablante	5	1
68	DF	(United States) Thomas Williams	2	0
72	DF	(United States) Nick O'Callaghan	1	0
Total			39	3

== Player movement ==
=== Transfers in ===
No.	Name	Pos.	Transferred from	Fee/notes	Date	Ref.
61	(United States) Austin Aviza	GK	(United States) Providence Friars	Signed professional contract	March 3, 2020	
47	(Ecuador) Franklin Carabalí	DF	(Ecuador) América de Quito	Signed professional contract	March 3, 2020	
55	(United States) Juan Pablo Monticelli	DF	(Mexico) Tijuana	Signed professional contract	March 3, 2020	
72	(United States) Nick O'Callaghan	DF	(United States) FIU Panthers	Signed professional contract	March 3, 2020	
63	(Colombia) Mateo Rodas	DF	(Colombia) Tigres	Signed professional contract	March 3, 2020	
64	(United States) Jonathan Rosales	DF	(United States) South Florida Bulls	Signed professional contract	March 3, 2020	
45	(United States) Raul Aguilera	MF	(United States) North Carolina Tar Heels	Signed professional contract	March 3, 2020	
56	(United States) Theodore Ndje	MF	(Argentina) Banfield	Signed professional contract	March 3, 2020	
49	(United States) Aleksandar Gluvačević	FW	(Serbia) OFK Vršac	Signed professional contract	March 3, 2020	
41	(Venezuela) Javier Otero	GK	(United States) Orlando City Development Academy	Signed Academy contract	March 3, 2020	
51	(United States) Russell Robles	GK	(United States) Orlando City Development Academy	Signed Academy contract	March 3, 2020	
50	(United States) Owen Guske	DF	(United States) Orlando City Development Academy	Signed Academy contract	March 3, 2020	
26	(United States) Michael Halliday	DF	(United States) Orlando City Development Academy	Signed Academy contract	March 3, 2020	
54	(United States) Mason Lamb	FW	(United States) Orlando City Development Academy	Signed Academy contract	March 3, 2020	
60	(Venezuela) Juan Ramos	DF	(United States) Orlando City Development Academy	Signed Academy contract	March 3, 2020	
65	(Puerto Rico) Daniel Rosario	DF	(United States) Orlando City Development Academy	Signed Academy contract	March 3, 2020	
68	(United States) Thomas Williams	DF	(United States) Orlando City Development Academy	Signed Academy contract	March 3, 2020	
53	(United States) Julian Kennedy	FW	(United States) Orlando City Development Academy	Signed Academy contract	March 3, 2020	
62	(Puerto Rico) Wilfredo Rivera	FW	(United States) Orlando City Development Academy	Signed Academy contract	March 3, 2020	
66	(Brazil) Kenji Tanaka de Paula	FW	(United States) Orlando City Development Academy	Signed Academy contract	March 3, 2020	

=== Loans in ===
No.	Name	Pos.	Loaned from	Notes	Date	Ref.
57	(United States) Adam Ozeri	MF	(Argentina) Ferro	Season-long loan	March 3, 2020	
58	(Argentina) Ignacio Poplawski	MF	(Argentina) Estudiantes	Season-long loan	March 3, 2020	
48	(Brazil) Fablo Dos Santos Oliveira	FW	(Brazil) Barra da Tijuca	Season-long loan	March 3, 2020	

=== Transfers out ===
No.	Name	Pos.	Transferred to	Fee/notes	Date	Ref.
19	(United States) Jordan Bender	MF	(United States) Orlando City SC	Promoted to senior team	December 12, 2019	
3	(United States) Wilfred Williams	DF	(United States) Oakland Roots	Out of contract	February 7, 2020	
12	(Mexico) Christian Herrera	GK	(United States) Oakland Roots	Out of contract	February 7, 2020	
9	(United States) Will Bagrou	FW	(Austria) Stadl-Paura	Out of contract	February 12, 2020	
14	(United States) Randy Mendoza	DF	(United States) Stumptown Athletic	Out of contract	February 25, 2020	
29	(Argentina) Lucas Ontivero	FW	(Brazil) Juventude	Out of contract	March 2, 2020	
4	(Canada) Brandon John	DF	(Canada) Atlético Ottawa	Out of contract	March 3, 2020	
13	(United States) Jordan Hill	DF	(United States) FC Tucson	Out of contract	March 3, 2020	
15	(United States) Tanner Hummel	DF		Out of contract	March 3, 2020	
7	(Democratic Republic of the Congo) Tresor Mbuyu	MF	(United States) Charlotte Independence	Out of contract	March 3, 2020	
10	(Brazil) Rafael Santos	MF		Out of contract	March 3, 2020	
20	(United States) Steven Hernandez	MF		Out of contract	March 3, 2020	
21	(Senegal) Ates Diouf	MF	(United States) Austin Bold	Out of contract	March 3, 2020	
8	(United States) Koby Osei-Wusu	FW		Out of contract	March 3, 2020	
25	(United States) Luc Granitur	FW	(United States) Montverde Academy	Out of contract	March 3, 2020	
73	(United States) Jahlane Forbes	DF	(United States) Wake Forest Demon Deacons	College commitment	March 3, 2020	
26	(Ghana) Emmanuel Hagan	DF	(United States) UNC Greensboro Spartans	College commitment	March 3, 2020	
26	(United States) Michael Halliday	DF	(United States) Orlando City SC	Promoted to senior team	July 15, 2020	
54	(United States) Mason Lamb	DF	(United States) Rollins Tars	College commitment	July 17, 2020	
60	(Venezuela) Juan Ramos	DF	(United States) UCF Knights	College commitment	July 17, 2020	
46	(United States) Austin Amer	MF	(Germany) Sportfreunde Lotte	Released at end of season	October 29, 2020	
61	(United States) Austin Aviza	GK	(United States) Richmond Kickers	Released at end of season	October 29, 2020	
47	(Ecuador) Franklin Carabalí	DF	(Ecuador) Aucas	Released at end of season	October 29, 2020	
50	(United States) Owen Guske	DF	(United States) UCF Knights	Released at end of season	October 29, 2020	
55	(United States) Juan Pablo Monticelli	DF	(United States) Richmond Kickers	Released at end of season	October 29, 2020	
56	(United States) Theodore Ndje	MF		Released at end of season	October 29, 2020	
72	(United States) Nick O'Callaghan	DF	(United States) Tormenta FC	Released at end of season	October 29, 2020	
63	(Colombia) Mateo Rodas	DF	(Colombia) Patriotas	Released at end of season	October 29, 2020	
64	(United States) Jonathan Rosales	DF		Released at end of season	October 29, 2020	

=== Loans out ===
No.	Name	Pos.	Loaned to	Notes	Date	Ref.
5	(Brazil) Sérginho	MF	(Brazil) Tombense		February 4, 2020	
