= 2021 Inter Miami CF season =

Inter Miami CF
2021 season
- President: David Beckham
- Head coach: Phil Neville
- Stadium: DRV PNK Stadium
- Major League Soccer: Conference: 11th Overall: 20th
- U.S. Open Cup: Canceled
- Highest home attendance: 17,926 (6/25 v. ORL)
- Lowest home attendance: 7,939 (4/18 v. LAG)
- Average home league attendance: 14,713
- Biggest win: MIA 5–1 CIN (10/23)
- Biggest defeat: MIA 0–5 NE (7/21)
Home colors	Away colors

The 2021 Inter Miami CF season was the second season in the history of Inter Miami CF and the 18th season of first-division club soccer in South Florida. In addition to playing in Major League Soccer, the club was scheduled to participate in the U.S. Open Cup but the competition was cancelled for the second consecutive year due to the COVID-19 pandemic.

== Background ==
Inter Miami is coming off their inaugural campaign, which marked the first time since 2001, with the Miami Fusion, that a soccer club in Greater Miami played in the first tier of American soccer. Ahead of and during the season, Miami signed several high-profile players including Argentine international, Gonzalo Higuaín, from Juventus; Mexican international, Rodolfo Pizarro, from Monterrey; and French international, Blaise Matuidi, from Juventus. The club also signed several notable young players including Matías Pellegrini, Lewis Morgan, and David Norman. Additionally, in the 2020 MLS SuperDraft, Miami drafted Clemson standout, Robbie Robinson with the first overall pick.

The club's first season was significantly altered due to the COVID-19 pandemic, which saw the season suspended on March 12 and not resume until July 8 with the MLS is Back Tournament. Miami lost their first two league matches before the season was suspended and subsequently lost their three group stage matches (which counted towards the regular season standings) at the MLS is Back Tournament. On August 22 against Floridian rivals, Orlando City SC, Miami won their first league match. Inter had better form following the MLS is Back Tournament, ultimately going 7–8–3, and finished the 2020 regular season with a 7–13–3 record, after 23 league matches, a reduction of the original 34 due to the COVID-19 pandemic.

Due to the pandemic, the size of the 2020 MLS Cup Playoffs was increased from eight teams in the Eastern Conference qualifying to 10 teams qualifying. Miami earned the 10th and final seed in the playoffs, where they played at fellow expansion side, Nashville SC in the Play-In Round on November 20. Miami lost the match 0–3, with several of their starters missing the match due to an outbreak of coronavirus on the team.

At the conclusion of the 2020 season, the club declined options on eight players. Notable players who did not have their contract renewed for the 2021 season included starting goalkeeper, Luis Robles, as well as Juan Agudelo, and Andres Reyes.

== Review ==
=== Offseason ===
On January 7, 2021, Inter Miami and first year head coach, Diego Alonso mutually agreed to part ways. Several names were rumored as Alonso's successor including Phil Neville. On January 18, 2021, Neville was confirmed as head coach.

== Management ==
Position	Staff
Ownership
Lead Managing Owner	(United States) Jorge Mas
President	(England) David Beckham
Chairman	(Bolivia) Marcelo Claure
Co-Owner	(United States) Jose Mas
Co-Owner	(Japan) Masayoshi Son
Front Office
Chief Business Officer	(Spain) Xavier Asensi
Sporting Director	(United States) Chris Henderson
Vice President	(United States) Pablo Alvarez
Coaching Staff
Head Coach	(England) Phil Neville
Assistant Coach	(United States) Jason Kreis
Assistant Coach	(Wales) Anthony Pulis
Director of Goalkeeping	(England) Mark Mason
Assistant Goalkeeper Coach	(Argentina) Sebastián Saja
Head of First Team Performance	(Venezuela) Miguel Motolongo
Sports Scientist	(United States) Nicholas Lewis
Performance Analyst	(England) Alec Scott
Assistant Analyst	(United States) Brett Uttley

Last updated: November 22, 2020
Source: Inter Miami CF

== Roster ==
Squad No.	Name	Nationality	Position	Date of birth (age)	Signed from
Goalkeepers
1	John McCarthy	(United States)	GK	July 4, 1992 (aged 28)	(United States) Tampa Bay Rowdies
18	Dylan Castanheira	(United States)	GK	May 23, 1995 (aged 25)	(United States) Fort Lauderdale CF
27	Drake Callender	(United States)	GK	October 7, 1997 (aged 23)	(United States) San Jose Earthquakes
32	Nick Marsman	(Netherlands)	GK	October 1, 1990 (aged 30)	(Netherlands) Feyenoord
Defenders
2	Ventura Alvarado	(United States)	DF	August 16, 1992 (aged 28)	(Mexico) Atlético San Luis
3	Kieran Gibbs	(England)	DF	September 26, 1989 (aged 31)	(England) West Bromwich Albion
4	Christian Makoun	(Venezuela)	DF	March 5, 2000 (aged 21)	(Italy) Juventus
5	Nicolás Figal	(Argentina)	DF	April 3, 1994 (aged 27)	(Argentina) Independiente
15	Patrick Seagrist	(United States)	DF	February 21, 1998 (aged 23)	(United States) New York Red Bulls
17	Ryan Shawcross	(England)	DF	October 4, 1987 (aged 33)	(England) Stoke City
24	Ian Fray	(United States)	DF	August 31, 2002 (aged 18)	(United States) Fort Lauderdale CF
26	Leandro González Pírez	(Argentina)	DF	February 26, 1992 (aged 29)	(Mexico) Tijuana
28	Brek Shea	(United States)	DF	February 28, 1990 (aged 31)	(United States) Atlanta United FC
31	Kelvin Leerdam	(Suriname)	DF	June 24, 1990 (aged 30)	(United States) Seattle Sounders FC
33	Joevin Jones	(Trinidad and Tobago)	DF	August 3, 1991 (aged 29)	(United States) Seattle Sounders FC
35	Sami Guediri	(United States)	DF	August 16, 1997 (aged 23)	(United States) Fort Lauderdale CF
Midfielders
7	Lewis Morgan	(Scotland)	MF	September 30, 1996 (aged 24)	(Scotland) Celtic
8	Blaise Matuidi	(France)	MF	April 9, 1987 (aged 34)	(Italy) Juventus
10	Rodolfo Pizarro	(Mexico)	MF	February 15, 1994 (aged 27)	(Mexico) Monterrey
13	Víctor Ulloa	(Mexico)	MF	March 4, 1992 (aged 29)	(United States) FC Cincinnati
14	Jay Chapman	(Canada)	MF	January 1, 1994 (aged 27)	(Canada) Toronto FC
22	Federico Higuaín	(Argentina)	MF	October 25, 1984 (aged 36)	(United States) D.C. United
25	Felipe Valencia	(United States)	MF	March 1, 2005 (aged 16)	(United States) Fort Lauderdale CF
26	Gregore	(Brazil)	MF	March 2, 1994 (aged 27)	(Brazil) Bahia
28	Edison Azcona	(Dominican Republic)	MF	November 21, 2003 (aged 17)	(United States) Fort Lauderdale CF
30	George Acosta	(United States)	MF	January 19, 2000 (aged 21)	(United States) Austin Bold
Forwards
9	Gonzalo Higuaín	(Argentina)	FW	December 10, 1987 (aged 33)	(Italy) Juventus
16	Josh Penn	(United States)	FW	November 25, 2000 (aged 20)	(United States) Indy Eleven
19	Robbie Robinson	(United States)	FW	December 17, 1998 (aged 22)	(United States) Clemson University
21	Julián Carranza	(Argentina)	FW	May 22, 2000 (aged 20)	(Argentina) Banfield
29	Indiana Vassilev	(United States)	FW	February 16, 2001 (aged 20)	(England) Aston Villa

== Transfers ==
=== Transfers in ===
Date	Position	No.	Name	From	Fee	Ref.
Winter 2020–21
December 18, 2020	MF	25	(United States) Felipe Valencia	(United States) Fort Lauderdale CF	Homegrown player	
December 23, 2020	DF	15	(United States) Patrick Seagrist	(United States) New York Red Bulls	Trade	
January 26, 2021	DF	24	(United States) Ian Fray	(United States) Fort Lauderdale CF	Homegrown player	
January 26, 2021	MF	28	(Dominican Republic) Edison Azcona	(United States) Fort Lauderdale CF	Homegrown player	
January 27, 2021	GK	18	(United States) Dylan Castanheira	(United States) Fort Lauderdale CF	Free	
February 12, 2021	MF	16	(United States) Josh Penn	(United States) Indy Eleven	SuperDraft	
February 20, 2021	DF	17	(England) Ryan Shawcross	(England) Stoke City	Free	
February 24, 2021	MF	26	(Brazil) Gregore	(Brazil) Bahia	$4,000,000	
March 11, 2021	DF	33	(Trinidad and Tobago) Joevin Jones	(United States) Seattle Sounders FC	Free	
March 23, 2021	DF	31	(Suriname) Kelvin Leerdam	(United States) Seattle Sounders FC	$75,000 GAM	
April 16, 2021	DF	35	(United States) Sami Guediri	(United States) Fort Lauderdale CF	Free	
Summer 2021
July 1, 2021	DF	3	(England) Kieran Gibbs	(England) West Bromwich Albion	Free	
July 1, 2021	GK	32	(Netherlands) Nick Marsman	(Netherlands) Feyenoord	Free	
July 7, 2021	FW	29	(United States) Indiana Vassilev	(England) Aston Villa	Loan	
July 29, 2021	DF	2	(United States) Ventura Alvarado	(Mexico) Atlético San Luis	Free	

=== Transfers out ===
Date	Position	No.	Name	To	Fee	Ref.
Winter 2020–21
December 3, 2020	DF	33	(United States) Mikey Ambrose	(United States) Atlanta United FC	Option Declined	
December 3, 2020	FW	12	(United States) Juan Agudelo	(United States) Minnesota United FC	Option Declined	
December 3, 2020	FW	17	(Germany) Jerome Kiesewetter	(United States) FC Tulsa	Option Declined	
December 3, 2020	MF	15	(Canada) David Norman Jr.	(Canada) Cavalry FC	Option Declined	
December 3, 2020	DF	2	(Jamaica) Alvas Powell	(Sudan) Al-Hilal	Option Declined	
December 3, 2020	GK	31	(United States) Luis Robles	Retired	Option Declined	
December 3, 2020	DF	36	(Haiti) Denso Ulysse	(United States) Richmond Kickers	Option Declined	
December 3, 2020	MF	6	(United States) Wil Trapp	(United States) Minnesota United FC	Free	
December 3, 2020	DF	20	(Guam) A. J. DeLaGarza	(United States) New England Revolution	Free	
December 13, 2020	DF	22	(United States) Ben Sweat	(United States) Austin FC	$100,000 GAM	
January 1, 2021	DF	3	(Colombia) Andrés Reyes	(Colombia) Atlético Nacional	End of Loan	
April 11, 2021	DF	18	(United States) Dylan Nealis	(United States) Nashville SC	$175,000 GAM	
Summer 2021
August 2, 2021	MF	11	(Argentina) Matías Pellegrini	(Argentina) Estudiantes	Loan	

=== MLS SuperDraft ===
Round	No.	Player	Pos.	Team
1	10	(United States) Josh Penn	FW	Indy Eleven
1	26	(Zambia) Aimé Mabika	DF	University of Kentucky
2	37	(United States) Joe Hafferty	MF	Oregon State University

== Non-competitive ==
=== Preseason ===
March 27 1	Tampa Bay Rowdies	1–0	Inter Miami	St. Petersburg, FL
	Wyke 81'			Stadium: Al Lang Stadium

== Competitive ==
=== Major League Soccer ===
==== Standings ====
===== Eastern Conference =====
Pos	Team	Pld	W	L	T	GF	GA	GD	Pts	Qualification
9	Columbus Crew	34	13	13	8	46	45	+1	47	
10	CF Montréal (Note: Canadian clubs cannot qualify for the 2022 CONCACAF Champions League through the MLS regular season or playoffs.)	34	12	12	10	46	44	+2	46	Qualification for the CONCACAF Champions League (Note: As 2021 Canadian Championship winners)
11	Inter Miami CF	34	12	17	5	36	53	−17	41	
12	Chicago Fire FC	34	9	18	7	36	54	−18	34	
13	Toronto FC	34	6	18	10	39	66	−27	28	

Source: MLS
Rules for classification: 1) points; 2) total wins; 3) total goal differential; 4) total goals scored; 5) fewer disciplinary points; 6) away goal differential; 7) away goals scored; 8) home goals differential; 9) home goals scored; 10) coin toss (2 clubs tied) or drawing of lots (≥3 clubs tied)

===== Overall table =====
Pos	Team	Pld	W	L	T	GF	GA	GD	Pts	Qualification
18	CF Montréal (V)	34	12	12	10	46	44	+2	46	Qualification for the 2022 CONCACAF Champions League (Note: As 2021 Canadian Championship winners (CAN1))
19	Los Angeles FC	34	12	13	9	53	51	+2	45	
20	Inter Miami CF	34	12	17	5	36	53	−17	41	
21	San Jose Earthquakes	34	10	13	11	46	54	−8	41	
22	Chicago Fire FC	34	9	18	7	36	54	−18	34	

Source: MLS
Rules for classification: 1) points; 2) total wins; 3) total goal differential; 4) total goals scored; 5) fewer disciplinary points; 6) away goal differential; 7) away goals scored; 8) home goals differential; 9) home goals scored; 10) coin toss (2 clubs tied) or drawing of lots (≥3 clubs tied)
(V) Canadian Championship winner

==== Results summary ====
Overall								Home						Away					
Pld	Pts	W	L	T	GF	GA	GD	W	L	T	GF	GA	GD	W	L	T	GF	GA	GD
34	41	12	17	5	36	53	−17	7	8	2	26	35	−9	5	9	3	10	18	−8

Source: MLS
Pld = Matches played; Pts = Points; W = Matches won; T = Matches tied; L = Matches lost; GF = Goals for; GA = Goals against; GD = Goal difference

==== Results by round ====
Round	1	2	3	4	5	6	7	8	9	10	11	12	13	14	15	16	17	18	19	20	21	22	23	24	25	26	27	28	29	30	31	32	33	34
Stadium	H	A	A	H	H	A	A	H	A	H	A	H	H	H	A	H	A	H	H	A	A	H	A	H	H	A	A	A	A	H	H	A	H	A
Result	L	W	D	D	L	W	L	L	L	L	L	L	D	W	D	W	L	W	W	D	W	W	W	L	L	L	L	L	L	W	W	L	L	W

Source: IMCF schedule
A = Away; H = Home; W = Win; D = Draw; L = Loss

==== Match results ====
April 18 1	Inter Miami	2–3	LA Galaxy	Fort Lauderdale, FL
3:00 p.m. EDT	Robinson 45+2'; G. Higuaín 68' (pen.)	Report	Hernández 62', 73'; Kljestan 81'	Stadium: DRV PNK Stadium; Attendance: 7,939; Referee: Chris Penso

April 24 2	Philadelphia Union	1–2	Inter Miami	Chester, PA
8:00 p.m. EDT	Monteiro 54'	Report	G. Higuaín 73'; F. Higuaín 83'	Stadium: Subaru Park; Attendance: 5,000; Referee: Alex Chilowicz

May 2 3	Nashville SC	0–0	Inter Miami	Nashville, TN
1:00 p.m. EDT		Report		Stadium: Nissan Stadium; Attendance: 13,855; Referee: Rosendo Mendoza

May 9 4	Inter Miami	1–1	Atlanta United FC	Fort Lauderdale, FL
1:00 p.m. EDT	Morgan 77'	Report	Martínez 9'	Stadium: DRV PNK Stadium; Attendance: 8,074; Referee: Joseph Dickerson

May 12 5	Inter Miami	0–2	CF Montréal	Fort Lauderdale, FL
7:30 p.m. EDT		Report	Johnsen 14', 25'	Stadium: DRV PNK Stadium; Attendance: 8,220; Referee: Guido Gonzales Jr.

May 16 6	FC Cincinnati	2–3	Inter Miami	Cincinnati, OH
4:00 p.m. EDT	Barreal 59'; Hagglund 82'	Report	Shea 7'; G. Higuaín 38', 85'	Stadium: TQL Stadium; Attendance: 6,000; Referee: Ramy Touchan

May 22 7	Chicago Fire FC	1–0	Inter Miami	Chicago, IL
6:00 p.m. EDT	Stojanović 69'	Report		Stadium: Soldier Field; Attendance: 10,844; Referee: Silviu Petrescu

May 29 8	Inter Miami	0–3	D.C. United	Fort Lauderdale, FL
8:00 p.m. EDT		Report	Kamara 15', 71'; Arriola 21'	Stadium: DRV PNK Stadium; Attendance: 15,945; Referee: Armando Villarreal

June 19 9	D.C. United	1–0	Inter Miami	Washington, D.C.
8:00 p.m. EDT	Kamara 72' (pen.)	Report	Gregore (yellow card) 47' (yellow-red card) 56'	Stadium: Audi Field; Attendance: 15,500; Referee: Fotis Bazakos

June 25 10	Inter Miami	1–2	Orlando City SC	Fort Lauderdale, FL
8:00 p.m. EDT	G. Higuaín 67'	Report	Mueller 73'; Nani 80'	Stadium: DRV PNK Stadium; Attendance: 17,926; Referee: Allen Chapman

July 3 11	CF Montréal	1–0	Inter Miami	Harrison, NJ
7:30 p.m. EDT	Choinière 41'	Report		Stadium: Red Bull Arena; Referee: Rosendo Mendoza
Note: CF Montréal played their home matches at DRV PNK Stadium. However, due to Gold Cup Qualification, the match was played at Red Bull Arena.

July 21 12	Inter Miami	0–5	New England Revolution	Fort Lauderdale, FL
7:30 p.m. EDT		Report	Traustason 15', 36'; Bunbury 27'; Buksa 45+4', 83'	Stadium: DRV PNK Stadium; Attendance: 13,963; Referee: Robert Sibiga

July 25 13	Inter Miami	1–1	Philadelphia Union	Fort Lauderdale, FL
7:30 p.m. EDT	Robinson 71'	Report	Przybyłko 85'	Stadium: DRV PNK Stadium; Attendance: 14,057; Referee: Joseph Dickerson

July 31 14	Inter Miami	2–1	CF Montréal	Fort Lauderdale, FL
8:00 p.m. EDT	G. Higuaín 49' (pen.), 69'	Report	Torres 20'	Stadium: DRV PNK Stadium; Attendance: 14,303; Referee: Victor Rivas

August 4 15	Orlando City SC	1–1	Inter Miami	Orlando, FL
8:00 p.m. EDT	Carlos 45+1'	Report	Gibbs 66'	Stadium: Exploria Stadium; Attendance: 17,966; Referee: Armando Villarreal

August 8 16	Inter Miami	2–1	Nashville SC	Fort Lauderdale, FL
6:00 p.m. EDT	G. Higuaín 60'; Vassilev 90+5'	Report	Sapong 48'	Stadium: DRV PNK Stadium; Attendance: 14,062; Referee: Nima Saghafi

August 14 17	New York City FC	2–0	Inter Miami	Harrison, NJ
3:30 p.m. EDT	Castellanos 20', 45+1' (pen.)	Report		Stadium: Red Bull Arena; Attendance: 4,194; Referee: Alex Chilowicz
Note: The match was originally scheduled to be played at Yankee Stadium.

August 18 18	Inter Miami	3–2	Chicago Fire FC	Fort Lauderdale, FL
4:00 p.m. EDT	Vassilev 34'; Robinson 62'; Pizarro 90+3'	Report	Calvo 40'; Stojanović 48'	Stadium: DRV PNK Stadium; Attendance: 13,196; Referee: Baldomero Toledo

August 21 19	Inter Miami	3–1	Toronto FC	Fort Lauderdale, FL
4:00 p.m. EDT	Pizarro 15', 48'; Robinson 35'	Report	Gibbs 62' (o.g.)	Stadium: DRV PNK Stadium; Attendance: 14,897; Referee: Jair Marrufo

August 27 20	Orlando City SC	0–0	Inter Miami	Orlando, FL
8:30 p.m. EDT	Akindele (penalty missed) 12'	Report		Stadium: Exploria Stadium; Attendance: 17,817; Referee: Ismail Elfath

September 4 21	FC Cincinnati	0–1	Inter Miami	Cincinnati, OH
7:30 p.m. EDT		Report	Shea 90'	Stadium: TQL Stadium; Attendance: 22,234; Referee: Lukasz Szpala

September 11 22	Inter Miami	1–0	Columbus Crew	Fort Lauderdale, FL
4:00 p.m. EDT	G. Higuaín 16'	Report		Stadium: DRV PNK Stadium; Attendance: 15,014; Referee: Alan Kelly

September 14 23	Toronto FC	0–1	Inter Miami	Toronto, ON
7:30 p.m. EDT	Lawrence (red card) 37'	Report	Makoun 90+5' (pen.)	Stadium: BMO Field; Attendance: 7,970; Referee: Ramy Touchan

September 17 24	Inter Miami	0–4	New York Red Bulls	Fort Lauderdale, FL
7:00 p.m. EDT	Figal (yellow card) 9' (yellow-red card) 38'	Report	Klimala 18'; Fernandez 31'; Fábio 65', 89'	Stadium: DRV PNK Stadium; Attendance: 18,535; Referee: Guido Gonzales, Jr.

September 22 25	Inter Miami	1–5	Nashville SC	Fort Lauderdale, FL
4:00 p.m. EDT	Higuaín 64'; Gregore (yellow card) 75' (yellow-red card) 86'	Report	Mukhtar 6', 48'; Zimmerman 39'; Leal 70'; Johnston 90+6'	Stadium: DRV PNK Stadium; Attendance: 13,033; Referee: Jon Freemon

September 29 26	Atlanta United FC	1–0	Inter Miami	Atlanta, GA
7:30 p.m. EDT	Martínez 78' (pen.)	Report		Stadium: Mercedes-Benz Stadium; Attendance: 42,519; Referee: Ted Unkel

October 3 27	Portland Timbers	1–0	Inter Miami	Portland, OR
5:30 p.m. EDT	Niezgoda 83'	Report		Stadium: Providence Park; Attendance: 22,006; Referee: Robert Sibiga

October 9 28	New York Red Bulls	1–0	Inter Miami	Harrison, NJ
6:00 p.m. EDT	Klimala 25'	Report		Stadium: Red Bull Arena; Attendance: 17,561; Referee: Tori Penso
Note: The match was originally scheduled for July 17 but was postponed due to inclement weather.

October 16 29	Columbus Crew	4–0	Inter Miami	Columbus, OH
6:00 p.m. EDT	Zardes 39', 64'; Santos 44'; González Pírez 83' (o.g.)	Report		Stadium: Mapfre Stadium; Attendance: 19,338; Referee: Rubiel Vazquez

October 20 30	Inter Miami	3–0	Toronto FC	Fort Lauderdale, FL
4:00 p.m. EDT	F. Higuaín 10'; Makoun 45'; Zavaleta 61' (o.g.)	Report		Stadium: DRV PNK Stadium; Attendance: 13,717; Referee: Armando Villarreal

October 23 31	Inter Miami	5–1	FC Cincinnati	Fort Lauderdale, FL
4:00 p.m. EDT	F. Higuaín 6'; G. Higuaín 53'; Vassilev 69'; Morgan 74'; Carranza 85'	Report	Vazquez 21'; Cruz (red card) 90+6'	Stadium: DRV PNK Stadium; Attendance: 14,927; Referee: Drew Fischer

October 27 32	Atlanta United FC	2–1	Inter Miami	Atlanta, GA
7:30 p.m. EDT	Luiz Araújo 59'; Martínez 73'	Report	G. Higuaín 32' (pen.)	Stadium: Mercedes-Benz Stadium; Attendance: 42,536; Referee: Guido Gonzales, Jr.

October 30 33	Inter Miami	1–3	New York City FC	Fort Lauderdale, FL
3:30 p.m. EDT	Figal 56'	Report	Castellanos 33', 60'; Magno 83'	Stadium: DRV PNK Stadium; Attendance: 17,595; Referee: Rosendo Mendoza

November 7 34	New England Revolution	0–1	Inter Miami	Foxborough, MA
3:30 p.m. EST		Report	Matuidi 58'	Stadium: Gillette Stadium; Attendance: 31,635; Referee: Alan Kelly

=== U.S. Open Cup ===
On July 20, US Soccer finally announced that the tournament would be cancelled for 2021 and would resume in 2022.

== Statistics ==
=== Overall ===
Games played	34
Games won	12
Games drawn	5
Games lost	17
Goals scored	36
Goals conceded	53
Goal difference	-17
Clean sheets	7
Yellow cards	55
Red cards	3
Worst discipline	
Best result(s)	5-1(FC Cincinnati)
Worst result(s)	0-5(New England Revolution)
Most appearances	26 games (Lewis Morgan)
Top scorer	12 goals(Gonzalo Higuaín)
Points	Overall:41

Last updated: October 30, 2021

=== Appearances and goals ===
Numbers after plus–sign (+) denote appearances as a substitute.

No.	Pos	Nat	Player	Total		MLS		MLS Cup		USOC	
No.	Pos	Nat	Player	Apps	Goals	Apps	Goals	Apps	Goals	Apps	Goals

- Last updated: November 22, 2020
- Source: TBD

=== Top scorers ===
Rank	Position	Number	Name	MLS	MLS Cup	USOC	Total
1	FW	9	(Argentina) Gonzalo Higuaín	12	0	0	12
2	FW	19	(United States) Robbie Robinson	4	0	0	4
3	MF	10	(Mexico) Rodolfo Pizarro	3	0	0	3
3	FW	29	(United States) Indiana Vassilev	3	0	0	3
3	MF	22	(Argentina) Federico Higuaín	3	0	0	3
6	DF	28	(United States) Brek Shea	2	0	0	2
6	MF	7	(Scotland) Lewis Morgan	2	0	0	2
6	DF	4	(Venezuela) Christian Makoun	2	0	0	2
9	FW	21	(Argentina) Julián Carranza	1	0	0	1
9	DF	3	(England) Kieran Gibbs	1	0	0	1
9	DF	5	(Argentina) Nicolás Figal	1	0	0	1
9	MF	8	(France) Blaise Matuidi	1	0	0	1
Total				35	0	0	35

As of 8 November 2021.

=== Top assists ===
Rank	Position	Number	Name	MLS	MLS Cup	USOC	Total

=== Disciplinary record ===
No.	Pos.	Player	MLS			MLS Cup			USOC			Total		
No.	Pos.	Player	Booked	(yellow card) (yellow-red card)	Sent off (straight red)	Booked	(yellow card) (yellow-red card)	Sent off (straight red)	Booked	(yellow card) (yellow-red card)	Sent off (straight red)	Booked	(yellow card) (yellow-red card)	Sent off (straight red)
26	MF	(Brazil) Gregore	12	2	0	0	0	0	0	0	0	12	2	0
16	DF	(Argentina) Leandro González Pírez	9	0	0	0	0	0	0	0	0	9	0	0
5	DF	(Argentina) Nicolás Figal	7	1	0	0	0	0	0	0	0	7	1	0
8	MF	(France) Blaise Matuidi	4	0	0	0	0	0	0	0	0	4	0	0
19	FW	(United States) Robbie Robinson	4	0	0	0	0	0	0	0	0	4	0	0

== Awards and honors ==
To be announced during the 2021 season.
