= 2020 Fort Lauderdale CF season =

Fort Lauderdale CF
2020 season
- Owner: David Beckham; Marcelo Claure; Jorge and Jose Mas; Masayoshi Son
- Head coach: Jason Kreis
- Stadium: Inter Miami CF Stadium
- USL League One: 10th
- USL1 Playoffs: Did not qualify
- Biggest win: FTL 2–0 ORL (Sept. 12)
- Biggest defeat: NTX 3–0 FTL (Oct. 3); NE 4–1 FTL (Oct. 9)
Home colors	Away colors

The 2020 Fort Lauderdale CF season was the inaugural season in the soccer team's history, where they compete in the third division of American soccer, USL League One. Fort Lauderdale CF, as a child club of Inter Miami CF of Major League Soccer, are barred from participating in the 2020 U.S. Open Cup. Fort Lauderdale CF play their home games at Inter Miami CF Stadium, located in Fort Lauderdale, Florida, United States.

== Club ==
=== Roster ===
As of February 25, 2020.

No.	Pos.	Nat.	Name
	GK	(United States)	Dylan Castanheira
	MF	(United States)	Blaine Ferri
	DF	(United States)	Ian Fray
	GK	(United States)	Daniel Gagliardi
	MF	(Cuba)	Rivaldo Ibarra
	FW	(United States)	Ricky Lopez-Espin
	DF	(Cuba)	Modesto Mendez
	DF	(Cuba)	Frank Nodarse
	DF	(Cuba)	Brian Rosales
	MF	(Venezuela)	Eduardo Sosa

=== Coaching staff ===
Name	Position
(United States) Jason Kreis	Head coach
(Northern Ireland) Martin Paterson	Assistant coach
(United States) Chris Barocas	Goalkeeping coach

=== Front Office Staff ===
Name	Position
(England) Darren Powell	Director of Player Development for Inter Miami CF
(Mexico) Mateus Manoel	Developmental Performance Manager

== Competitions ==
=== USL League One ===
==== Standings ====
Pos	Team	Pld	W	L	D	GF	GA	GD	Pts	PPG
7	Forward Madison FC	16	5	5	6	20	14	+6	21	1.31
8	Tormenta FC	16	5	7	4	19	22	−3	19	1.19
9	New England Revolution II (Note: Professional teams that are owned by teams playing in a higher division are ineligible for the U.S. Open Cup.)	16	5	8	3	19	26	−7	18	1.13
10	Fort Lauderdale CF	16	4	9	3	19	28	−9	15	0.94
11	Orlando City B	15	1	11	3	10	29	−19	6	0.40

Source: 2020 USL League One standings
Rules for classification: 1) points; 2) total wins; 3) total goal differential; 4) total goals scored; 5) points earned against top four Conference finishers; 6) disciplinary points; 7) coin toss or drawing of lots

==== Results summary ====
Overall								Home						Away					
Pld	W	D	L	GF	GA	GD	Pts	W	D	L	GF	GA	GD	W	D	L	GF	GA	GD
6	2	1	3	7	9	−2	7	1	0	2	4	6	−2	1	1	1	3	3	0

Source: USL League One

==== Results by round ====
Round	1	2	3	4	5	6	7	8	9	10	11	12	13	14	15	16	17	18	19	20	21	22	23	24	25	26	27	28
Stadium	H	A	H	H	A	H	H	A	A	H	A	H	A	H	H	A	A	H	A	H	A	A	H	A	H	A	H	A
Result	L	L	W	D	W	L																						
Position	10	11	9	8	4																							

Source: USL League One
A = Away; H = Home; W = Win; D = Draw; L = Loss

==== Match results ====
July 18, 2020 1	Fort Lauderdale CF	0–2	Greenville Triumph SC	Fort Lauderdale, Florida
7:00 PM EDT		Report	Morrell 45+4'; Keegan 47'	Stadium: Inter Miami CF Stadium; Referee: Natalie Simon

July 25, 2020 2	Fort Lauderdale CF	1–2	FC Tucson	Fort Lauderdale, Florida
7:00 PM EDT	Lopez-Espin 8'	Report	Liadi 87'; Valenzuela 90'	Stadium: Inter Miami CF Stadium; Referee: Elvis Osmanovic

August 8, 2020 3	South Georgia Tormenta FC	1–2	Fort Lauderdale CF	Statesboro, Georgia
8:00 PM EDT	Rowe 90+3'	Report	Azcona 41'; Lopez-Espin 76'	Stadium: Eagle Field at Erk Russell Athletic Park; Attendance: 400; Referee: Kevin Broadley

August 14, 2020 4	Orlando City B	1–1	Fort Lauderdale CF	Kissimmee, Florida
7:00 PM EDT	Rivera 22'	Report	Lopez-Espin 39'	Stadium: Osceola County Stadium; Referee: Gabriele Giusti

August 19, 2020 5	Fort Lauderdale CF	3–2	North Texas SC	Fort Lauderdale, Florida
8:00 PM EDT	Lopez-Espin 28', 36'; Valencia 56'	Report	Romero 39' (pen.); Alisson 75'	Stadium: Inter Miami CF Stadium; Referee: Alex Billeter

August 22, 2020 6	Greenville Triumph SC	1–0	Fort Lauderdale CF	Greenville, South Carolina
7:00 PM EDT	Pilato 67'	Report		Stadium: Legacy Early College Field; Attendance: 993; Referee: Sergii Demianchuk

September 5, 2020 7	Fort Lauderdale CF	1–1	Chattanooga Red Wolves SC	Fort Lauderdale, Florida
8:00 PM EDT	Zacarías 26' (o.g.)	Report	Ualefi 42'	Stadium: Inter Miami CF Stadium; Referee: Alejo Calume

September 12, 2020 8	Fort Lauderdale CF	2–0	Orlando City B	Fort Lauderdale, Florida
8:00 PM EDT	Azcona 5'; Lopez-Espin 51'	Report		Stadium: Inter Miami CF Stadium; Referee: Natalie Simon

September 19, 2020 9	Fort Lauderdale CF	1–2	South Georgia Tormenta FC	Fort Lauderdale, Florida
8:00 PM EDT	Azcona 5'	Report	Thorn 19'; Mayr-Fälten 62'	Stadium: Inter Miami CF Stadium; Referee: Jonathan Bilinski

September 23, 2020 10	Richmond Kickers	2–1	Fort Lauderdale CF	Richmond, Virginia
6:30 PM EDT	Terzaghi 26', 54'	Report	Lopez-Espin 5'	Stadium: City Stadium; Attendance: 692; Referee: Danielle Chesky
Note: Reschedule of postponed August 1 match.

September 26, 2020 11	FC Tucson	1–2	Fort Lauderdale CF	Tucson, Arizona
10:30 PM EDT	Ramos-Godoy 55' (pen.)	Report	Kiesewetter 87'; Sosa 90+4'	Stadium: Kino North Stadium; Referee: Samantha Martinez

September 30, 2020 12	Fort Lauderdale CF	2–3	Union Omaha	Fort Lauderdale, Florida
8:00 PM EDT	Sosa 42'; Valencia 55'	Report	Panchot 25'; Conway 48'; Vanacore-Decker 84'	Stadium: Inter Miami CF Stadium; Referee: Alyssa Nichols

October 3, 2020 13	North Texas SC	3–0	Fort Lauderdale CF	Arlington, Texas
6:30 PM EDT	Damus 57', 89'; A. Rodríguez 80'	Report		Stadium: Globe Life Park; Attendance: 889; Referee: Héctor Hernández

October 9, 2020 14	New England Revolution II	4–1	Fort Lauderdale CF	Foxborough, Massachusetts
7:00 PM EDT	Firmino 42'; Rennicks 60'; Spaulding 75'; Mendonca 90+3'	Report	Valencia 52'	Stadium: Gillette Stadium; Referee: Kenneth Rojas

October 14, 2020 15	Fort Lauderdale CF	2–2	Forward Madison FC	Fort Lauderdale, Florida
4:00 PM EDT	Sosa 38'; Reyes 67'	Report	Paulo Jr. 73'; Díaz 85'	Stadium: Inter Miami CF Stadium; Referee: Johan Fredrik Roenning

October 24, 2020 16	Union Omaha	1–0	Fort Lauderdale CF	Papillion, Nebraska
8:00 PM EDT	Conway 90+1'	Report		Stadium: Werner Park; Attendance: 2,700; Referee: Karen Callado

== See also ==
- 2020 Inter Miami CF season
