= Fablo =

Brazilian footballer (born 1999)

Personal information
- Full name: Fablo dos Santos Oliveira
- Date of birth: 15 February 1999 (age 27)
- Place of birth: Rio de Janeiro, Brazil
- Height: 5 ft 9 in (1.75 m)
- Position: Forward

Team information
- Current team: Barra da Tijuca

Senior career*
Years	Team	Apps	(Gls)
2019–	Barra da Tijuca	0	(0)
2020	→ Orlando City B (loan)	5	(0)
- * Club domestic league appearances and goals as of 24 October 2020

Fablo dos Santos Oliveira (born 15 February 1999), also known simply as Fablo, is a Brazilian professional footballer who plays as a forward for Barra da Tijuca.

== Club career ==
Born in Rio de Janeiro, Fablo began his career with Barra da Tijuca, making his debut for the team on 16 June 2019 in a 2–0 defeat to Campos in the 2019 Campeonato Carioca Série B1 state championship.

In March 2020, Fablo joined American USL League One side Orlando City B on loan for the 2020 season. He made his debut for Orlando City B on 14 August 2020 as a 58th minute substitute for José Quintero during a 1–1 draw with Fort Lauderdale.

== Career statistics ==
=== Club ===
As of 24 October 2020

Appearances and goals by club, season and competition
Club	Season	League			National Cup		Other		Total	
Club	Season	Division	Apps	Goals	Apps	Goals	Apps	Goals	Apps	Goals
Barra da Tijuca	2019	CB1	0	0	0	0	5 (Note: Campeonato Carioca Série B1)	0	5	0
Orlando City B	2020	USL1	5	0	—		—		5	0
Career total			5	0	0	0	5	0	10	0
