= Kerlyson =

Brazilian footballer

Personal information
- Full name: Kerlyson Viana de Moraes
- Date of birth: 13 January 1994 (age 32)
- Place of birth: Rio de Janeiro, Brazil
- Height: 1.86 m (6 ft 1 in)
- Position: Defender

Team information
- Current team: Maranhão

Youth career
- Botafogo

Senior career*
Years	Team	Apps	(Gls)
2014–2015	Bangu	0	(0)
2015–2018	Barra da Tijuca	0	(0)
2019	Gonçalense	0	(0)
2020–	Maranhão		
- * Club domestic league appearances and goals as of 18:02, 2 June 2020 (UTC)

Kerlyson Viana de Moraes (born 4 January 1996), commonly known as Kerlyson, is a Brazilian footballer who plays for Maranhão.

== Career statistics ==
=== Club ===
As of 2 June 2020.

Club	Season	League			State League		Cup		Other		Total	
Club	Season	Division	Apps	Goals	Apps	Goals	Apps	Goals	Apps	Goals	Apps	Goals
Bangu	2014	–			0	0	0	0	6 (Note: Appearances in the Copa Rio)	0	6	0
Bangu	2015	–			1 (Note: Appearances in the Campeonato Carioca)	0	0	0	2	0	3	0
Bangu	Total		0	0	1	0	0	0	8	0	9	0
Barra da Tijuca	2015	–			6 (Note: Appearances in the Campeonato Carioca B1)	0	0	0	0	0	6	0
Barra da Tijuca	2016	–			–							
Barra da Tijuca	2017	–			16	1	0	0	0	0	16	1
Barra da Tijuca	2018	–			15	0	0	0	0	0	15	0
Barra da Tijuca	Total		0	0	37	1	0	0	0	0	37	1
Gonçalense	2019	–			15	0	0	0	0	0	15	0
Career total			0	0	53	1	0	0	8	0	61	1
