= Kieran Gibbs =

English footballer (born 1989)

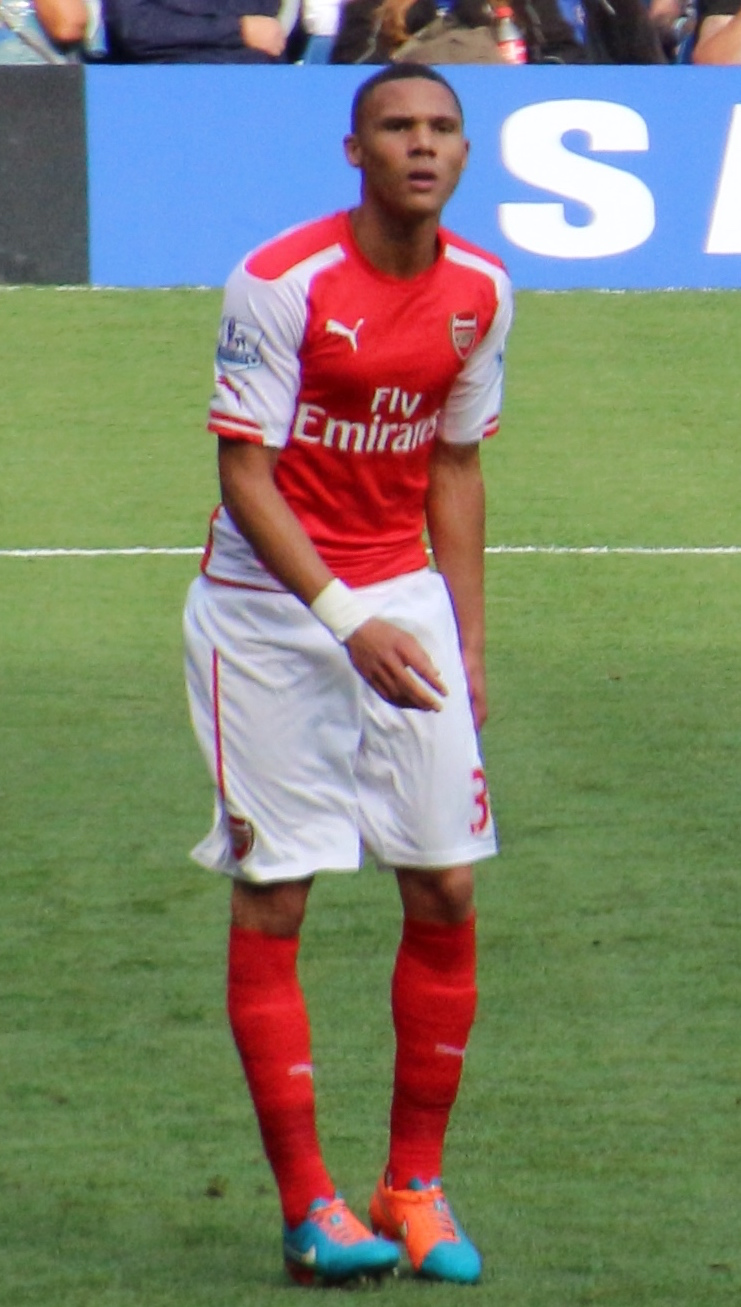
- Gibbs playing for Arsenal in 2014

Personal information
- Full name: Kieran James Ricardo Gibbs
- Date of birth: 26 September 1989 (age 37)
- Place of birth: Lambeth, England
- Height: 5 ft 11 in (1.81 m)
- Position: Left-back

Youth career
- 2001–2004: Wimbledon
- 2004–2007: Arsenal

Senior career*
Years	Team	Apps	(Gls)
2007–2017	Arsenal	137	(2)
2008	→ Norwich City (loan)	7	(0)
2017–2021	West Bromwich Albion	93	(5)
2021–2023	Inter Miami	27	(1)
2022	Inter Miami II	1	(0)
Total		265	(8)

International career
2007–2008	England U19	9	(0)
2009	England U20	1	(0)
2009–2011	England U21	15	(3)
2010–2015	England	10	(0)
Medal record
Men's football
Representing England
UEFA European Under-21 Championship
Runner-up	2009 Sweden
- * Club domestic league appearances and goals

Kieran James Ricardo Gibbs (born 26 September 1989) is an English former professional footballer who played as a left-back.

Gibbs began his senior career with Arsenal in 2007, after joining the club from the Wimbledon academy in 2004. He started out as a winger and moved to a more prominent left-back role after a loan spell with Norwich City during the same 2007–08 season where he made his Arsenal debut. He moved to fellow English side West Bromwich Albion in August 2017 and would remain with the club over the next four seasons before moving to play for Inter Miami in Major League Soccer in 2021.

Gibbs made his full senior England debut in a friendly against Hungary at Wembley Stadium on 11 August 2010. He made ten total appearances for the senior team over five years.

== Early and personal life ==
Kieran James Ricardo Gibbs was born in Lambeth, London, England. He is of Gaelic and Bajan ancestry. His twin brother, Jaydon, is also a footballer and has played for Dover Athletic and Aldershot Town.

== Club career ==
=== Arsenal ===
==== Early career ====
After beginning his career at the Wimbledon academy, Gibbs moved to Arsenal along with Abu Ogogo and James Dunne when Wimbledon disbanded in 2004 and became Milton Keynes Dons. Gibbs played as a left winger and also in the centre midfield position. He featured regularly for Arsenal's youth and reserve teams.

==== 2007–08 season ====
In September 2007, Gibbs signed a professional contract with Arsenal, and was named in the club's UEFA Champions League squad. He made his first-team debut for the club when he started a League Cup match against Sheffield United on 31 October 2007, and made his second appearance coming on as a substitute for Eduardo da Silva in Arsenal's quarter-final against Blackburn Rovers on 18 December 2007.

On 31 January 2008, he agreed to go on loan to Championship club Norwich City until the end of the 2007–08 season. He returned to Arsenal a match early on 29 April 2008 and retook his place in the Arsenal reserve squad. He went on to make the substitutes bench for Arsenal's first-team match against Everton on 4 May 2008 but did not play.

==== 2008–09 season ====
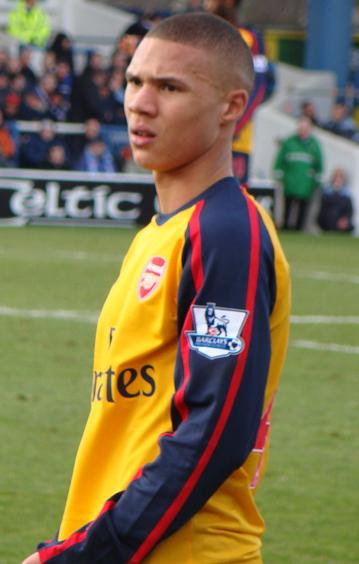
Gibbs playing for Arsenal in 2009

He featured in Arsenal pre-season matches for the 2008–09 season, mostly as a left back, and was an unused substitute in Arsenal's 1–0 Premier League loss to Fulham on 24 August 2008, and a 3–1 victory over Bolton Wanderers on September. Gibbs continued to play in Arsenal's League Cup campaign and played the full 90 minutes in Arsenal's 6–0 win over Sheffield United in the third round, on 23 September 2008. He also played in the 3–0 win over Wigan Athletic as well as starting in the defeat to Burnley at the quarter final stage. He made his UEFA Champions League debut on 10 December 2008, against FC Porto in Portugal, replacing Abou Diaby. Gibbs made his Premier League debut against Tottenham Hotspur on 8 February 2009, coming on as a substitute for the injured Gaël Clichy.

With Clichy injured, Gibbs made his first UEFA Champions League start for Arsenal in the quarter-final second leg against Villarreal on 15 April 2009, which Arsenal won 3–0. Gibbs started a FA Cup semi-final against Chelsea and set up Theo Walcott's goal. He was also involved when Arsenal drew with Liverpool on 21 April at Anfield, where he cleared the ball off the line. After an extended run in the first team in Clichy's absence, Gibbs made an appearance in the UEFA Champions League semi-final first leg away at Manchester United, which Arsenal lost 1–0. In the second leg, Gibbs made a costly slip when attempting to defend a cross and allowed Park Ji-sung to score a crucial away goal for United after only seven minutes.

==== 2009–10 season ====
He started in Arsenal's opening home match of the 2009–10 season against Portsmouth and featured for the whole 90 minutes. With Clichy injured and out for several weeks, Wenger entrusted the left back spot to the youngster. However, on 24 November 2009, Gibbs broke a metatarsal in his right foot in Arsenal's 2–0 UEFA Champions League victory over Standard Liège as a result of a lunge from Eliaquim Mangala, sidelining him for the rest of the season.

==== 2010–11 season ====
Gibbs made his first start of the season and completed 90 minutes when he replaced Gaël Clichy at left back against Bolton on 11 September 2010. In a League Cup match at Tottenham, Gibbs started the match, deputising for Gaël Clichy at left back. During the period of extra time, Gibbs suffered a suspected broken metatarsal to his left foot and he was replaced by Clichy. A day later, the club confirmed via their official website that Gibbs had only suffered severe bruising to his left foot. He made his comeback a week later in a UEFA Champions League 3–1 away win against FK Partizan. He conceded a penalty in the second half which was eventually saved by Łukasz Fabiański.

==== 2011–12 season ====
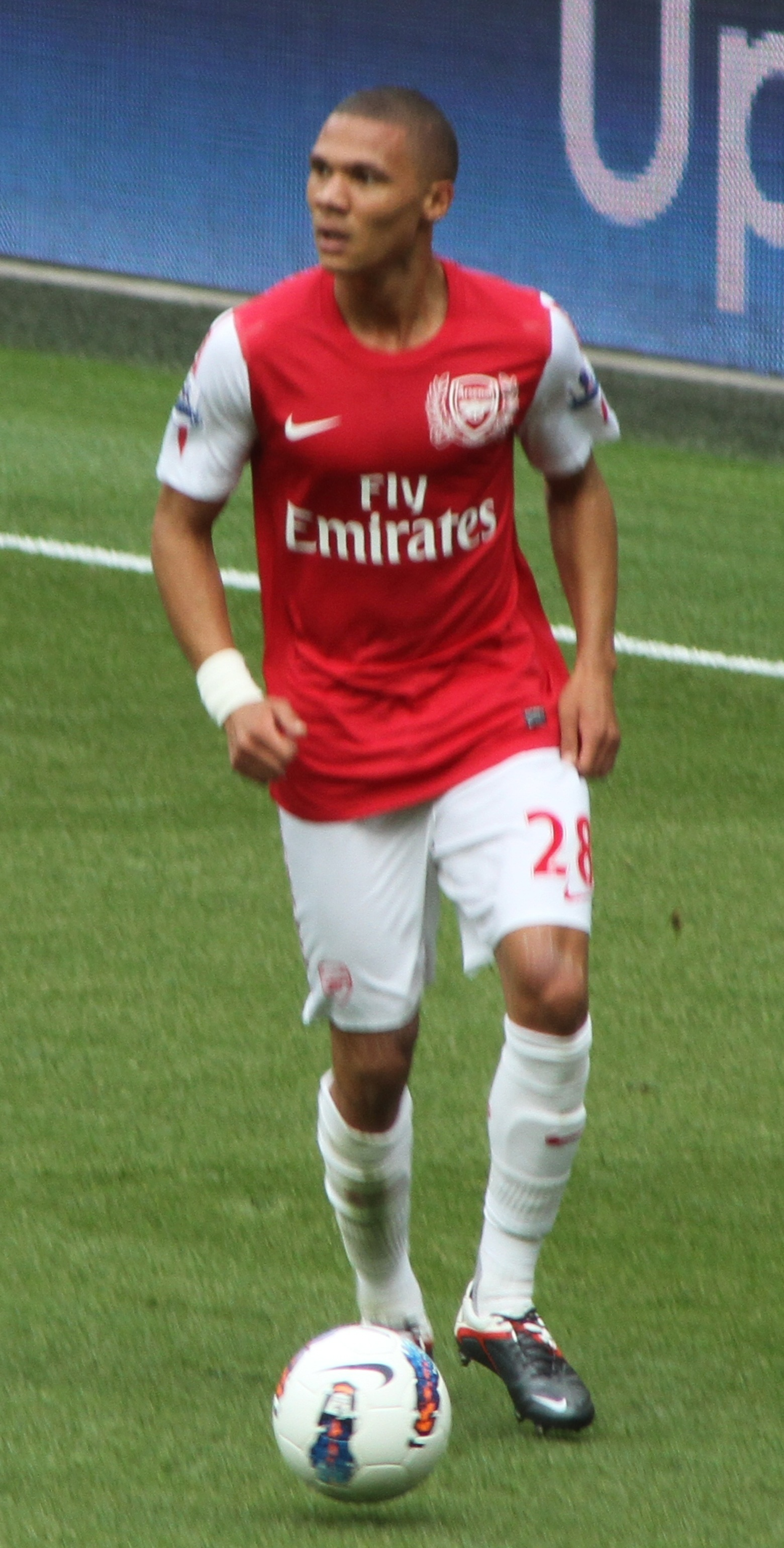
Gibbs playing for Arsenal in 2011

Following the departure of Gaël Clichy to Manchester City, Wenger confirmed that Gibbs would be replacing Clichy as first-choice left back.

On 20 September 2011, Gibbs scored his first goal for Arsenal in the 33rd minute of a League Cup match against Shrewsbury Town. On 16 October 2011 in the 2–1 victory over Sunderland, Gibbs suffered a stomach problem five minutes into the second half and was replaced by André Santos. On 17 November, Gibbs underwent hernia surgery and was expected to be out for up to six weeks.

Gibbs returned to training on 31 January 2012. Gibbs made his first start since October against Milan in the first leg of the UEFA Champions League round of 16, although he played a fine match, Arsenal lost 4–0.

Gibbs made his first start since October in the Premier League in the North London derby against Spurs which Arsenal won 5–2. He scored his first league goal for Arsenal on 24 March 2012 in a 3–0 win against Aston Villa at the Emirates. On 13 May 2012 against West Bromwich Albion, the last match of the season, Gibbs came on as a substitute for Gervinho in the 67th minute and made a crucial sliding tackle to prevent Billy Jones from scoring an equaliser in the dying minutes. The match ended in a 3–2 win to Arsenal which secured Arsenal's 3rd-place finish ahead of fellow rivals Tottenham.

==== 2012–13 season ====
Gibbs started the 2012–13 season as Arsenal's first choice left back and his impressive run of early season form led to praise from the manager and international recognition. On 19 December 2012, it was announced that Gibbs, along with teammates Alex Oxlade-Chamberlain, Carl Jenkinson, Aaron Ramsey and Jack Wilshere, signed a new long-term contract with Arsenal. He scored his first goal of the season on 6 January against Swansea City at the Liberty Stadium in the FA Cup with a spectacular volley inside the penalty area.

On 30 January 2013, Gibbs picked up a thigh injury during a match against Liverpool and was ruled out for six weeks. Gibbs had to wait for his next Premier League start due to his injury and due to the signing of Nacho Monreal from Málaga on the last day of the January transfer window. He made substitute appearances against Reading and West Bromwich Albion, and he did start the second leg of their UEFA Champions League last 16 tie with Bayern Munich. As this is so, his first start in the Premier League since Monreal's arrival came on 13 April 2013 against Norwich City, with Arsenal winning 3–1.

==== 2013–14 season ====
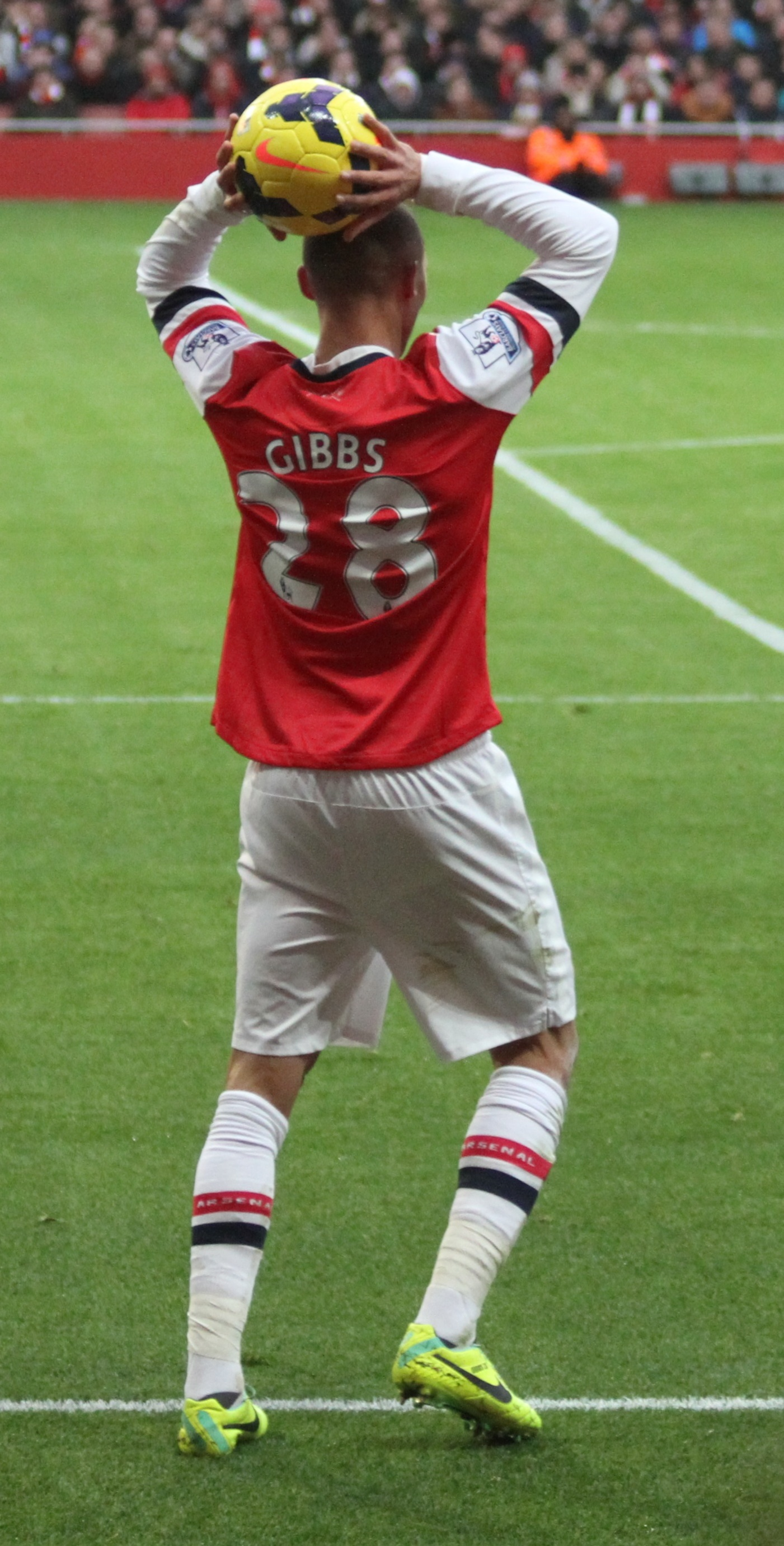
Gibbs playing for Arsenal in 2013

On 21 August 2013, Gibbs scored the opening goal of a 3–0 win away to Fenerbahçe in the UEFA Champions League play-off round, from a Theo Walcott cross. On 22 March against Chelsea, Gibbs was incorrectly shown a red card after referee Andre Marriner misidentified him for Oxlade-Chamberlain, who committed a handball in an attempt to prevent a Chelsea scoring opportunity. On 17 May, Gibbs started in the 2014 FA Cup Final as Arsenal beat Hull City 3–2 at Wembley Stadium.

==== 2014–15 season ====
Gibbs started in the 2014 FA Community Shield on 10 August, in which Arsenal beat Manchester City 3–0 at Wembley Stadium. On 23 October 2014, he scored his first goal of the season, an 89th-minute volleyed equaliser in a 2–1 win in a group stage match in the UEFA Champions League away at Anderlecht. He was an unused substitute for the 2015 FA Cup Final on 30 May, as Arsenal beat Aston Villa 4–0 at Wembley Stadium.

==== 2015–16 season ====
Gibbs played in the 2015 FA Community Shield, a match Arsenal won 1–0 against Chelsea at Wembley Stadium. He scored his first goal of the season on 8 November 2015, equalising in the 77th minute against Tottenham. His strike was also the 24,000th goal of the Premier League era thus putting him into the record books.

==== 2016–17 season ====
Gibbs captained Arsenal for the first time in an EFL Cup match against Nottingham Forest at the City Ground which they won 4–0. In December 2016, he said he enjoyed the additional responsibilities of captaincy, and stressed the importance of improving communication on the pitch. When he took over from the injured Laurent Koscielny as captain during a Champions League match against Bayern Munich that Arsenal lost heavily, former Manchester United captain Roy Keane opined that "When I see Gibbs with the captain's armband at the end of the game you're in big trouble. If he's your captain or your leader, if he's the guy who's going to bring everyone together, you're in huge trouble." Former England international Dean Ashton thought there had been no obvious alternative to Gibbs, who showed his selflessness by accepting the role. He finished the season with 22 appearances in all competitions.

=== West Bromwich Albion ===
On 30 August 2017, Gibbs signed for West Bromwich Albion on a four-year contract, for a fee in the region of £6.75 million. His first goal for the club came in a 7-1 thumping of QPR in EFL Championship. On 19 September 2020, Gibbs was sent off in a 5–2 loss to Everton after he slapped Colombian James Rodriguez in the face.

In June 2021, Gibbs was one of the players announced to leave West Brom following the expiration of his contract, departing after a total of four years and 93 domestic league appearances, as he would ultimately join American side Inter Miami effective on 1 July.

=== Inter Miami ===
On 23 March 2021, it was announced that Gibbs would join Major League Soccer club Inter Miami when his contract with West Brom ran out in June.

On 23 February 2023, Inter Miami decided to terminate Gibbs' contract on mutual terms. He subsequently joined the club's broadcasting team, and quietly retired from professional football shortly thereafter.

== International career ==
Gibbs was part of the England U19 squad that was knocked out in the group stages of the 2008 UEFA European Under-19 Championship but qualified for 2009 FIFA U-20 World Cup in Egypt as a result of finishing third in their group.

Gibbs was called up for the England U21 squad along with Arsenal teammate Theo Walcott for the 2009 UEFA European Under-21 Championship in Sweden. He scored two goals in a pre-tournament friendly victory over Azerbaijan in a 7–0 rout at Stadium mk on 8 June 2009 and converted his penalty in the tournament semi-final against Sweden. Thus England reached the final of the U21 Euros, a match that the Three Lions lost, wherein Gibbs earned a silver medal as a runner-up.

He scored the opening goal in a 6–3 win over Macedonia in a 2011 U21 Euros qualifier on 9 October 2009. Gibbs was thus selected by manager Stuart Pearce as part of the squad for the 2011 UEFA European Under-21 Championship to be held in Denmark. He eventually had to pull out due to an ankle injury.

Gibbs was eligible to feature for either Barbados or England at the senior level. As so, Gibbs was called up by Fabio Capello to England for his first cap in a friendly against Hungary on 11 August at Wembley Stadium. He came on as a half-time substitute for Ashley Cole. After two injury affected seasons, Gibbs was rewarded for his good form and again called up to the England squad on 8 October 2013 by new manager Roy Hodgson.

== Career statistics ==
=== Club ===
As of match played 17 October 2022

Appearances and goals by club, season and competition
Club	Season	League			National cup (Note: Includes FA Cup)		League cup (Note: Includes Football League Cup/EFL Cup)		Continental		Other		Total	
Club	Season	Division	Apps	Goals	Apps	Goals	Apps	Goals	Apps	Goals	Apps	Goals	Apps	Goals
Arsenal	2006–07	Premier League	0	0	0	0	0	0	0	0	—		0	0
Arsenal	2007–08	Premier League	0	0	0	0	2	0	0	0	—		2	0
Arsenal	2008–09	Premier League	8	0	6	0	3	0	4 (Note: Appearances in UEFA Champions League)	0	—		21	0
Arsenal	2009–10	Premier League	3	0	0	0	2	0	2	0	—		7	0
Arsenal	2010–11	Premier League	7	0	6	0	4	0	3	0	—		20	0
Arsenal	2011–12	Premier League	16	1	0	0	1	1	5	0	—		22	2
Arsenal	2012–13	Premier League	27	0	3	1	1	0	3	0	—		34	1
Arsenal	2013–14	Premier League	28	0	5	0	0	0	8	1	—		41	1
Arsenal	2014–15	Premier League	22	0	3	0	0	0	7	1	1 (Note: Appearance in FA Community Shield)	0	33	1
Arsenal	2015–16	Premier League	15	1	5	0	2	0	5	0	1	0	28	1
Arsenal	2016–17	Premier League	11	0	2	0	3	0	6	0	—		22	0
Arsenal	2017–18	Premier League	0	0	—		—		—		0	0	0	0
Arsenal	Total		137	2	30	1	18	1	43	2	2	0	230	6
Norwich City (loan)	2007–08	Championship	7	0	—		—		—		—		7	0
West Bromwich Albion	2017–18	Premier League	33	0	2	0	1	0	—		—		36	0
West Bromwich Albion	2018–19	Championship	36	4	0	0	0	0	—		2 (Note: Appearances in EFL Championship play-offs)	0	38	4
West Bromwich Albion	2019–20	Championship	14	1	1	0	0	0	—		—		15	1
West Bromwich Albion	2020–21	Premier League	10	0	1	0	0	0	—		—		11	0
West Bromwich Albion	Total		93	5	4	0	1	0	—		2	0	100	5
Inter Miami	2021	Major League Soccer	12	1	—		—		—		—		12	1
Inter Miami	2022	Major League Soccer	15	0	0	0	—		—		1 (Note: Appearance in MLS Cup Playoffs)	0	16	0
Inter Miami	Total		27	1	0	0	—		—		1	0	28	1
Career total			264	8	35	1	19	1	43	2	5	0	366	12

=== International ===
As of match played 17 November 2015

Appearances and goals by national team and year
National team	Year	Apps	Goals
England	2010	2	0
England	2011	0	0
England	2012	0	0
England	2013	1	0
England	2014	3	0
England	2015	4	0
Total		10	0

== Honours ==
Arsenal

- FA Cup: 2013–14, 2014–15, 2016–17
- FA Community Shield: 2014, 2015
- Football League Cup runner-up: 2010–11

West Bromwich Albion

- EFL Championship runner-up: 2019–20

England U21

- UEFA European Under-21 Championship runner-up: 2009
