= Christian Makoun =

Venezuelan footballer (born 2000)

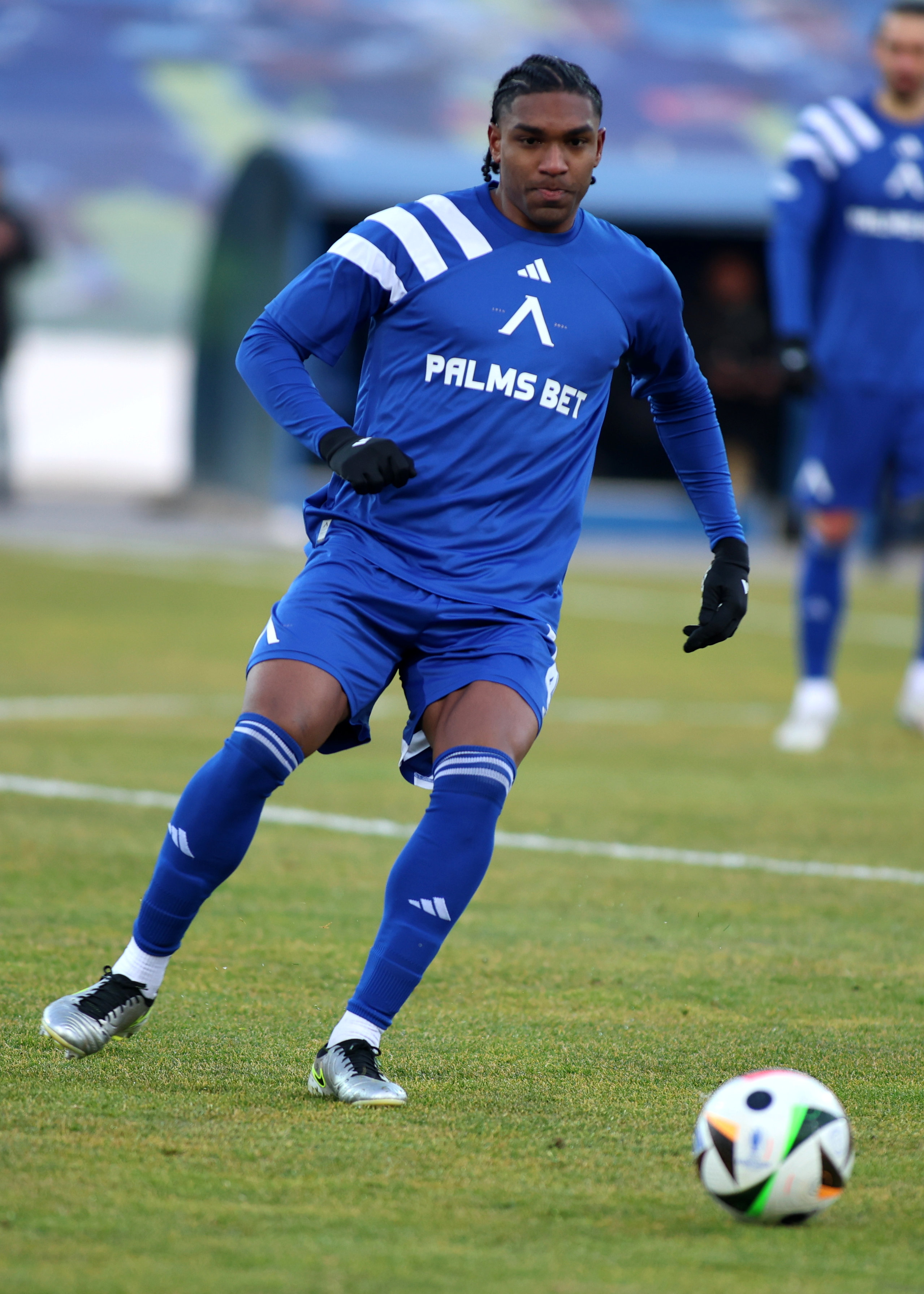

Personal information
- Full name: Christian Frederick Bayoi Makoun Reyes
- Date of birth: 5 March 2000 (age 26)
- Place of birth: Valencia, Venezuela
- Height: 6 ft 1 in (1.85 m)
- Positions: Defensive midfielder; defender

Team information
- Current team: Levski Sofia
- Number: 4

Youth career
- 2010–2018: Zamora

Senior career*
Years	Team	Apps	(Gls)
2016–2019	Zamora	32	(1)
2018–2019	→ Juventus U23 (loan)	0	(0)
2020–2021	Inter Miami	30	(2)
2020	→ Fort Lauderdale CF (loan)	3	(0)
2022	Charlotte FC	13	(0)
2022–2023	New England Revolution	17	(0)
2024	Anorthosis Famagusta	13	(2)
2024–	Levski Sofia	62	(4)

International career^{‡}
2017	Venezuela U17	9	(1)
2017–2018	Venezuela U20	14	(3)
2022–	Venezuela	17	(0)
- * Club domestic league appearances and goals as of 8 November 2026 ‡ National team caps and goals as of 28 September 2026

Christian Frederick Bayoi Makoun Reyes (born 5 March 2000) is a Venezuelan professional footballer who plays as both a defensive midfielder and defender for Bulgarian First League club Levski Sofia and the Venezuela national team.

== Club career ==
A product of Zamora, Makoun made his debut with the club on 27 July 2016, in a Copa Venezuela match where they beat Atlético Socopó 4–2. On 20 July 2018, he joined Juventus Academy on loan with an option to join permanently.

On 6 August 2019, Makoun joined Inter Miami for their debut campaign, making his debut on 1 March 2020, in a 1–0 defeat against LAFC. On September 5, he was loaned to the affiliate team Fort Lauderdale. After recovering from COVID and establishing himself in both Fort Lauderdale's & Inter Miami's squads, in 2021, he was confirmed in the squad for Inter Miami's second season. He was transferred to Charlotte on 10 January 2022, for the first spot in the MLS Allocation Ranking. On 4 August, he was transferred to New England Revolution for General Allocation Money for the 2022 & 2023 season.

On 1 January 2024, Makoun returned to Europe, joining Cypriot club Anorthosis Famagusta. He scored his first goal for the club on 9 February against Omonia in a 3–1 defeat. On 7 August, he joined Bulgarian club Levski Sofia, signing a three-year contract.

== International career ==
Makoun was called up to the Venezuela under-20 side for the 2017 FIFA U-20 World Cup.

== Personal life ==
He also holds Belgian citizenship through his Belgian-based Cameroonian father. His father, also named Christian Makoun, was a youth international footballer for Cameroon and played during his career for Caïman Douala, Deportivo Pesquero, Club Atlético Huracán, FC Jūrmala, FK Genclerbirliyi Sumqayit and Belgian clubs Cercle Brugge and Rhodienne-De Hoek.

== Career statistics ==
=== Club ===
As of 13 September 2026

Appearances and goals by club, season and competition
Club	Season	League			National cup (Note: Includes Copa Venezuela, US Open Cup, Cypriot Cup, and Bulgarian Cup)		Continental		Other		Total	
Club	Season	Division	Apps	Goals	Apps	Goals	Apps	Goals	Apps	Goals	Apps	Goals
Zamora	2016	Primera División	0	0	4	0	0	0	—		4	0
Zamora	2017	Primera División	9	0	5	0	2 (Note: Appearances in Copa Libertadores)	0	—		16	0
Zamora	2018	Primera División	13	0	0	0	2 (Note: Appearances in Copa Sudamericana)	0	—		15	0
Zamora	2019	Primera División	10	1	0	0	0	0	—		10	1
Zamora	Total		32	1	9	0	4	0	—		45	1
Juventus U23	2018–19	Serie C	0	0	0	0	—		—		0	0
Inter Miami	2020	MLS	4	0	0	0	—		—		4	0
Inter Miami	2021	MLS	26	2	0	0	—		—		26	2
Inter Miami	Total		30	2	0	0	—		—		30	2
Fort Lauderdale CF	2020	USL League One	3	0	0	0	—		—		3	0
Charlotte FC	2022	MLS	13	0	2	0	—		—		15	0
New England Revolution	2022	MLS	8	0	–		—		—		8	0
New England Revolution	2023	MLS	9	0	2	0	—		1 (Note: Appearances in MLS Cup Playoffs)	0	12	0
New England Revolution	Total		17	0	2	0	—		1	0	20	0
Anorthosis Famagusta	2023–24	Cypriot First Division	13	2	2	0	—		—		15	2
Levski Sofia	2024–25	First League	26	3	3	0	—		—		29	3
Levski Sofia	2025–26	First League	24	1	0	0	7 (Note: Four appearances in UEFA Europa League, three appearances in UEFA Conference League)	0	1 (Note: Appearance in Bulgarian Supercup)	0	32	1
Levski Sofia	2026–27	First League	9	0	0	0	2 (Note: One appearance in UEFA Champions League, one appearance in UEFA Europa League)	0	1	0	12	0
Levski Sofia	Total		59	4	3	0	9	0	2	0	73	4
Career total			217	9	18	0	13	0	3	0	201	8

=== International ===
As of match played 28 September 2026

Appearances and goals by national team and year
National team	Year	Apps	Goals
Venezuela	2022	6	0
Venezuela	2023	3	0
Venezuela	2024	4	0
Venezuela	2025	2	0
Venezuela	2026	2	0
Total		17	0

== Honours ==
Zamora

- Copa Venezuela: 2019

Levski Sofia

- Bulgarian First League: 2025–26

Venezuela U20

- FIFA U-20 World Cup runner-up: 2017
