= Adam Ozeri =

American soccer player

Personal information
- Date of birth: March 7, 1998 (age 28)
- Place of birth: New York City, New York, United States
- Height: 1.87 m (6 ft 2 in)
- Position: Attacking midfielder

Team information
- Current team: Patriotas
- Number: 25

Youth career
- Manhattan Kickers
- TSF Academy
- Cornellà
- Racing Club
- Banfield
- 2016–2017: Alianza Lima
- 2017–2019: Ferro Carril Oeste

Senior career*
Years	Team	Apps	(Gls)
2019–2020	Ferro Carril Oeste	1	(0)
2019	→ Boavista (loan)	3	(0)
2020	→ Orlando City B (loan)	12	(0)
2021–	Patriotas	1	(0)

International career
- United States U19
- * Club domestic league appearances and goals as of 19:10, 10 August 2021 (UTC)

Adam Ozeri (born March 7, 1998) is an American professional soccer player who plays as an attacking midfielder for Patriotas Boyacá of the Colombian Categoría Primera A.

== Club career ==
Ozeri started his youth career in his homeland with Manhattan Kickers, before switching to TSF Academy soon after. Ozeri would eventually head to Spain with Cornellà, notably finishing as top goalscorer in 2014 for the U15s of the Catalonia-based club. After leaving Cornellà, Ozeri headed to Argentina with Racing Club. After time in their youth, he moved over to Banfield's system. In mid-2016, Ozeri was signed by Peru's Alianza Lima; though would see no senior action. In 2017, Ozeri sealed a return to Argentina with Ferro Carril Oeste. February 2019 saw Ozeri depart on loan to Brazilian Série D outfit Boavista.

After featuring four times, including twice against Gaúcho, for Boavista, Ozeri went back to Ferro Carril Oeste ahead of the 2019–20 campaign in Primera B Nacional. His first appearance subsequently arrived, as he played the full duration of a 2–1 defeat away to Estudiantes on September 13. In 2020, Ozeri joined Orlando City B on loan, making 12 appearances for the team in USL League One.

In February 2021, Ozeri joined Patriotas.

== International career ==
2014 saw Ozeri participate in training camps with both Israel and the United States at youth level. In August 2016, Ozeri was called up to the latter's U19s by Brad Friedel for the subsequent month's Stevan Vilotic Tournament in Subotica, Serbia. He also made Friedel's squad for a training camp in the succeeding November.

== Career statistics ==
As of October 24, 2020.

Appearances and goals by club, season and competition
Club	Season	League			Cup		League Cup		Other		Total	
Club	Season	Division	Apps	Goals	Apps	Goals	Apps	Goals	Apps	Goals	Apps	Goals
Ferro Carril Oeste	2018–19	Primera B Nacional	0	0	0	0	—		—		0	0
Ferro Carril Oeste	2019–20	Primera B Nacional	1	0	0	0	—		—		1	0
Ferro Carril Oeste	Total		1	0	0	0	0	0	0	0	1	0
Boavista (loan)	2019	Série D	3	0	0	0	—		1 (Note: Appearance(s) in the Campeonato Carioca)	0	4	0
Orlando City B (loan)	2020	USL1	12	0	—		—		—		12	0
Career total			16	0	0	0	0	0	1	0	17	0
