= Tyler Hall (soccer) =

American soccer player (born 2006)

Personal information
- Full name: Tyler Austin Hall
- Date of birth: February 5, 2006 (age 20)
- Place of birth: Miramar, Florida, U.S.
- Height: 1.78 m (5 ft 10 in)
- Position: Defender

Team information
- Current team: Inter Miami
- Number: 26

Youth career
- Weston FC
- –2023: Inter Miami CF

Senior career*
Years	Team	Apps	(Gls)
2022–2023	Inter Miami II	29	(2)
2023–	Inter Miami	0	(0)
2024–	→ Inter Miami II (loan)	17	(0)

International career^{‡}
2022	United States U16	3	(0)
2022–2023	United States U17	13	(0)
Medal record
Men's football
Representing United States
CONCACAF U-17 Championship
Runner-up	2023 Guatemala
- * Club domestic league appearances and goals as of January 10, 2024 ‡ National team caps and goals as of February 26, 2023

Tyler Austin Hall (born February 5, 2006) is an American professional soccer player who plays for Major League Soccer club Inter Miami.

== Club career ==
=== Inter Miami CF II ===
Hall made his debut in the 2022 MLS Next Pro season against Columbus Crew 2, becoming the youngest starter in the league in its first week, being 16, on an academy contract. Hall later signed with Inter Miami II in March 2023. Hall scored his first goal for Inter Miami II on August 27, 2023, against Huntsville City FC.

In 2023 Hall was selected to become an all-star for MLS NEXT.

=== Inter Miami CF ===
On January 10, 2024, Hall signed a Homegrown Player contract with the Inter Miami senior team.

== International career ==
Hall was born in the United States and is of Guyanese descent, was eligible to represent the United States national team and the Guyana national team.

On September 1, 2023, Hall got called up for the U.S. U-17 MYNT for the Václav Ježek Cup matches against Ukraine, Switzerland, and the Czech Republic.

== Honors ==
Inter Miami

- Leagues Cup: 2023

United States U17

- CONCACAF U17 Championship runner-up: 2023
