= Ignacio Poplawski =

Argentine association football player

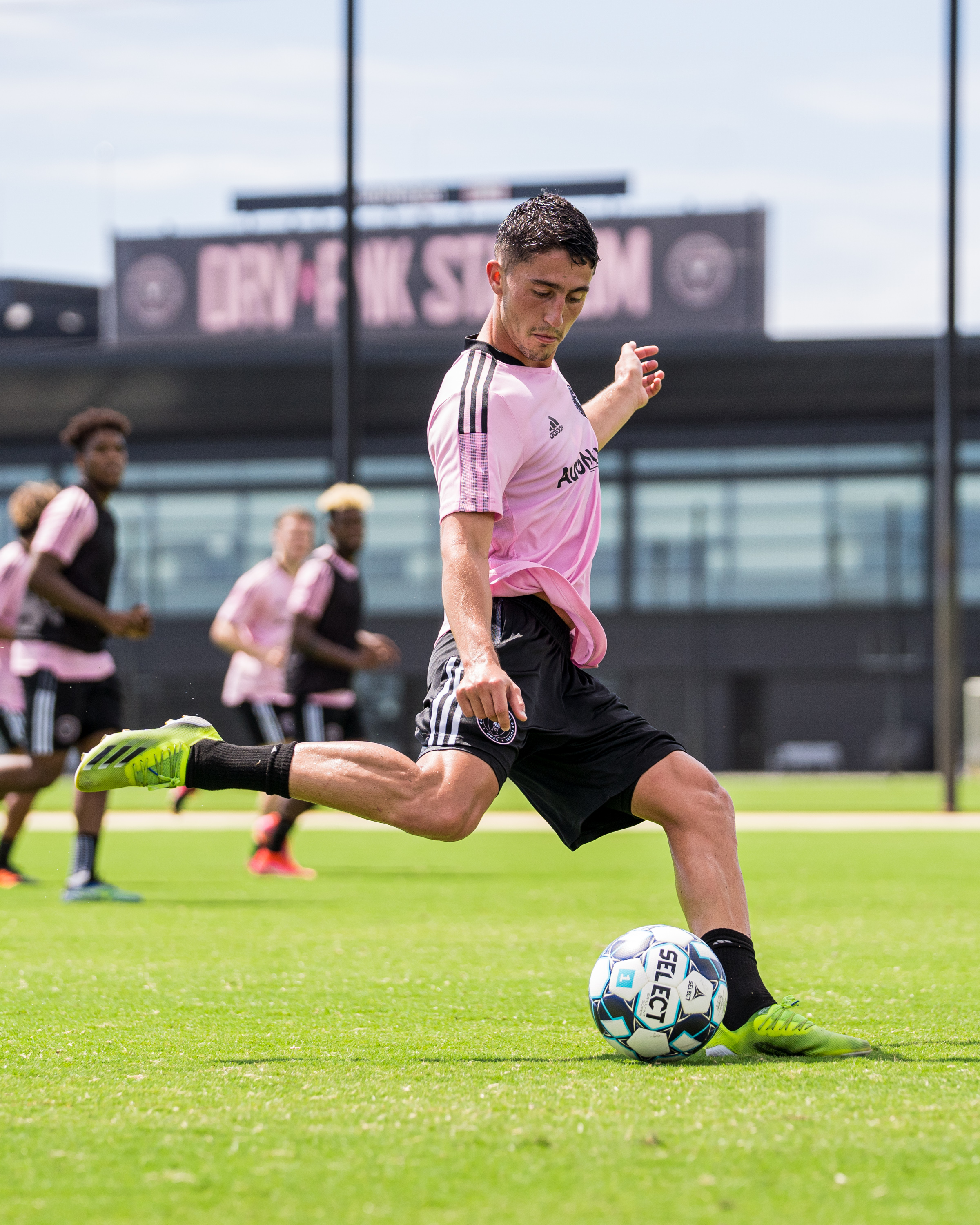

Personal information
- Full name: Roberto Ignacio Poplawski
- Date of birth: 15 March 1998 (age 28)
- Place of birth: Buenos Aires, Argentina
- Height: 5 ft 9 in (1.75 m)
- Position: Midfielder

Team information
- Current team: Estudiantes

Youth career
- Sunrise Soccer Club
- Boca United
- Estudiantes

Senior career*
Years	Team	Apps	(Gls)
2019–	Estudiantes	0	(0)
2020	→ Orlando City B (loan)	0	(0)
2021	→ Fort Lauderdale CF (loan)	23	(0)
- * Club domestic league appearances and goals as of 31 October 2021

Roberto Ignacio Poplawski (born 15 March 1998) is an Argentine professional footballer who plays as a midfielder for Estudiantes.

== Career ==
Poplawski began his career with Sunrise Soccer Club before joining Boca United. He then moved to his native Argentina where he signed with Estudiantes, signing a professional contract on 7 June 2019.

On 3 March 2020 it was announced that Poplawski joined USL League One club Orlando City B on loan for the 2020 season. After not playing with Orlando in 2020, Poplawski joined Fort Lauderdale CF prior to the 2021 season on loan. He made his professional debut for the club on 10 April 2021, against the New England Revolution II, coming on as a 60th-minute substitute in a 1–0 defeat.

== Personal life ==
Born in Argentina, Poplawski is of Polish descent.

== Career statistics ==
As of match played 1 June 2021

Appearances and goals by club, season and competition
Club	Season	League			Cup		Continental		Total	
Club	Season	Division	Apps	Goals	Apps	Goals	Apps	Goals	Apps	Goals
Fort Lauderdale CF (loan)	2021	USL League One	9	0	—		—		9	0
Career total			9	0	0	0	0	0	9	0
