= Matías Acevedo =

Argentine footballer (born 2008)

Personal information
- Full name: Matías Damián Acevedo
- Date of birth: 9 February 2008 (age 18)
- Place of birth: Lanús, Argentina
- Height: 1.68 m (5 ft 6 in)
- Position: Midfielder

Team information
- Current team: Inter Miami II (loan)
- Number: 48

Youth career
- 2012–2024: Racing Club

Senior career*
Years	Team	Apps	(Gls)
2024–	Racing Club	1	(0)
2026–	Inter Miami II (loan)	1	(0)
- * Club domestic league appearances and goals

Matías Damián Acevedo (born 9 February 2008) is an Argentine footballer currently playing as a midfielder for Inter Miami II.

== Club career ==
Born in Lanús in Buenos Aires Province, Acevedo began his footballing career at the age of four with youth team of Racing Club de Avellaneda. He signed his first professional contract with the club in 2024. On 22 September 2024 he made his professional debut, coming on as a substitute for Agustín Urzi in a 0–2 defeat against Talleres de Córdoba.

Matías Acevedo officially joined Inter Miami II on loan from the Argentine club Racing Club de Avellaneda on May 20, 2026. His transfer agreement includes a purchase option and lasts until December 2026.

On 24 May 2026, he made his debut for Inter Miami II in a 4–1 defeat against Orlando City B, starting and playing the full 90 minutes.
