= Braxton Taghvai-Najib =

American soccer player

Personal information
- Date of birth: December 23, 2002 (age 23)
- Place of birth: Draper, Utah, United States
- Position: Midfielder

Youth career
- 2013–2019: Real Salt Lake
- 2020: Pateadores

Senior career*
Years	Team	Apps	(Gls)
2020	Birmingham Legion	7	(0)
2021–2023	Inter Miami CF II	53	(1)
2023	→ Indy Eleven (loan)	0	(0)
2024	Portland Timbers 2	17	(0)
- * Club domestic league appearances and goals as of November 18, 2024

Braxton Taghvai-Najib (born December 23, 2002) is an American soccer player who plays as a midfielder.

== Club career ==
=== Youth ===
Najib played in the youth academy of Major League Soccer side Real Salt Lake from the under-9 to under-18 levels as well as spending a short time with Orange County sides Pateadores SC and Orange County SC. Taghvai-Najib has also gone on trial in Europe with Sporting Lisbon, Dinamo Zagreb, and other clubs.

=== Professional ===
In July 2020, Najib signed his first professional contract with USL Championship side Birmingham Legion. He made his debut on July 15, 2020, appearing as an 82nd-minute substitute in a 3–0 win over Memphis 901.

In April 2021, Najib joined Major League Soccer club Inter Miami CF and was registered to play for USL League One side Inter Miami CF II for the 2021 season.

After playing the 2024 MLS Next Pro season with Portland Timbers 2, the club chose not to exercise Najib's contract option for the following season.

== Indoor soccer career ==
In 2026, Najib joined IShowSpeed's Speed United in the Baller League USA.
