= Lawson Sunderland =

American soccer player (born 2001)

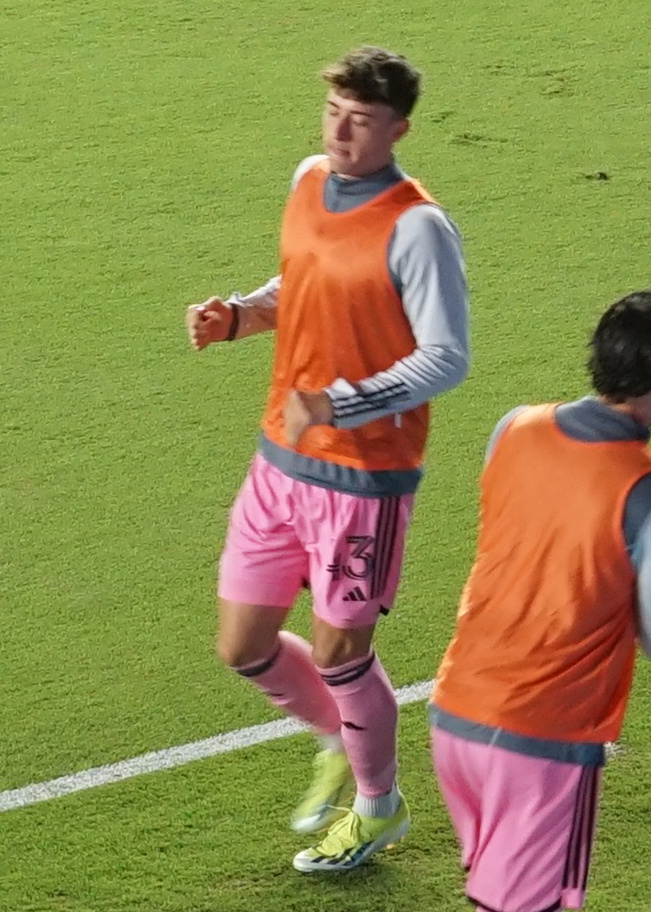
- Sunderland with Inter Miami in 2024

Personal information
- Full name: Lawson Connery Sunderland
- Date of birth: November 7, 2001 (age 25)
- Place of birth: Aurora, Illinois, United States
- Height: 1.90 m (6 ft 3 in)
- Position: Midfielder

Youth career
- 2015–2016: Chicago Fire
- 2016–2017: Portland Timbers
- 2017–2018: Levante
- 2018–2019: Sabadell
- 2019–2020: Damm

Senior career*
Years	Team	Apps	(Gls)
2020–2021	Sant Andreu	28	(1)
2021–2024	Inter Miami II	51	(9)
2023–2024	Inter Miami	7	(0)
2025–2026	Dordrecht	38	(2)
- * Club domestic league appearances and goals as of August 21, 2026

Lawson Connery Sunderland (born November 7, 2001) is an American professional soccer player who plays as a midfielder.

== Career ==
=== Inter Miami II ===
Sunderland joined Inter Miami CF II during the start of the 2022 MLS Next Pro season. He made his debut on April 10, against Orlando City SC B.

=== Inter Miami ===
Lawson made his Inter Miami CF debut on July 15, 2023, against St. Louis City SC, as a substitute, on a short loan from Inter Miami CF II.

Lawson later signed with Inter Miami on September 8, 2023, until 2026.

=== Dordrecht ===
On January 29, 2025, Sunderland signed a contract with Dordrecht in the Netherlands for two-and-a-half years, with an optional additional year. On August 26, 2026, Sunderland's contract with Dordrecht was mutually terminated.

== Honors ==
Inter Miami

- Supporters' Shield: 2024
