= Eduardo Hungaro =

Brazilian football manager (born 1976)

Personal information
- Full name: Eduardo Pedro Hungaro
- Date of birth: 16 August 1963 (age 63)
- Place of birth: Rio de Janeiro, Brazil

Team information
- Current team: Barra da Tijuca (Coach)

Managerial career
- Years: Team
- 2007–2009: Sertanense
- 2010: Botafogo U13
- 2011–2013: Botafogo U20
- 2014: Botafogo
- 2016: Cabofriense
- 2017: Real Noroeste
- 2017: Ríver
- 2018–: Barra da Tijuca

Eduardo Pedro Hungaro, known as Eduardo Hungaro (born 16 August 1963), is a Brazilian football manager.

== Career ==
Hungaro was born in Rio de Janeiro. He began his career as a coach of youth teams in various clubs. He began to be visible in the 2007–08 season, when he led Sertanense in the quarter-final of the Taça de Portugal. At the time the club was in the Terceira Divisão of the country (equivalent to Serie D in Brazil).

In 2010, he was promoted to command the Botafogo U13. The following year, he was promoted to the U20, leading them to a state championship title. He served as assistant Oswaldo de Oliveira.

After the departure of Oswaldo, who accepted an offer from Santos. he was named manager of Botafogo. He was fired after a poor campaign and elimination in the group stage of the Libertadores 2014. He still worked in Botafogo, as assistant coach.

== Honours ==
Sertanense

- Terceira Divisão – Série D: 2008–09

Botafogo

- 2011 Campeonato Carioca Sub-20
- 2013 Torneio Otávio Pinto Guimarães
