= Aleksandar Gluvačević =

American soccer player (born 1997)

Personal information
- Date of birth: September 8, 1997 (age 29)
- Place of birth: Charlotte, North Carolina, United States
- Height: 6 ft 5 in (1.96 m)
- Position: Forward

Team information
- Current team: Albion San Diego
- Number: 33

Youth career
- –2015: IMG Academy
- 2015–2016: Rad

Senior career*
Years	Team	Apps	(Gls)
2016–2017	Dorćol	4	(2)
2017–2018	Dunav Stari Banovci	14	(2)
2018–2019	Vršac	?	(?)
2020	Orlando City B	10	(1)
2022	Des Moines Menace	1	(0)
2023	Club de Lyon 2		
2023	Club de Lyon	0	(0)
2023–	Albion San Diego	10	(2)
- * Club domestic league appearances and goals as of November 6, 2023

Aleksandar Gluvačević (born September 8, 1997) is an American professional soccer player who plays as a forward for Albion San Diego in the National Independent Soccer Association.

== Career ==
Gluvačević played in Florida with the IMG Academy and had committed to playing college soccer at Florida Atlantic University in 2015. However, he instead opted to move to Serbia, the birthplace of his parents.

=== Serbia ===
In 2015, Gluvačević signed with Serbian SuperLiga team Rad but saw his game time limited to the youth team as the club ran into issues and were unable to register him to play for the first team. He won the youth league title with Rad. Ahead of the 2016–17 season, Gluvačević moved to third-tier side Dorćol and was eventually registered to be able to play in official matches. He scored two goals in four appearances before making the switch to Dunav Stari Banovci and later Vršac, all of the third division.

=== United States ===
In March 2020, Gluvačević returned to Florida to sign a professional contract with USL League One side Orlando City B ahead of the 2020 season. On August 1, 2020, he made his debut in the season opener against Tormenta FC, appearing as a 77th-minute substitute in the 2–0 defeat. He scored his first goal for the club on October 24 in a 4–1 defeat to Greenville Triumph.

In 2022, Gluvačević joined Des Moines Menace of USL League Two.
