= Daniel Rosario =

Puerto Rican footballer

Personal information
- Full name: Daniel Rosario Rodríguez
- Date of birth: April 10, 2002 (age 24)
- Place of birth: Bayamón, Puerto Rico
- Height: 5 ft 11 in (1.80 m)
- Position: Defender

Youth career
- Gladiadores de Dorado
- Eleven FC
- 2016–2020: Orlando City

College career
Years	Team	Apps	(Gls)
2021	Boston University Terriers	14	(0)

Senior career*
Years	Team	Apps	(Gls)
2020	Orlando City B	7	(0)

International career^{‡}
2019	Puerto Rico U17	3	(0)
2021–	Puerto Rico	5	(0)
- * Club domestic league appearances and goals as of January 9, 2024 ‡ National team caps and goals as of June 2, 2021

Daniel Rosario Rodríguez (born April 10, 2002) is a Puerto Rican footballer.

== Career ==
Rosario played in his native Puerto Rico with Gladiadores de Dorado and Eleven FC, before his family moved to Florida and he joined the Orlando City academy in 2016.

=== Senior ===
In March 2020, Rivera signed an academy contract with Orlando City B, Orlando City's USL League One affiliate. He made his debut on 28 August 2020, appearing as a 75th-minute substitute during a 1–1 draw with South Georgia Tormenta.

=== International ===
Rosario made his Puerto Rico under-17 debut in 2019 during 2019 CONCACAF U-17 Championship qualifying and later represented the team during the knockout stage, starting in a 2–1 loss to Mexico in the Round of 16.

On January 19, 2021, he made his senior debut with Puerto Rico starting in a friendly 1–0 win over Dominican Republic.
