= Felipe Valencia =

Professional soccer player (born 2005)

Personal information
- Date of birth: March 1, 2005 (age 21)
- Height: 5 ft 9 in (1.75 m)
- Position: Winger

Youth career
- 2016–2017: Plantation FC
- 2017–2019: Kendall SC
- 2019–2022: Inter Miami

Senior career*
Years	Team	Apps	(Gls)
2020–2024	Inter Miami II (Note: Inter Miami CF II was formerly known as Fort Lauderdale CF until 2020)	28	(3)
2021–2024	Inter Miami	0	(0)
2025	Lexington SC II	6	(0)
- * Club domestic league appearances and goals as of December 16, 2025

Felipe Valencia (born March 1, 2005) is an American soccer player who most recently played as a winger for USL League Two club Lexington II.

== Career ==
=== Fort Lauderdale CF ===
Valencia made his league debut for the club on August 8, 2020, in a 2–1 away victory over Tormenta FC. On August 19, 2020, he scored his first professional goal against North Texas SC in a 3–2 home victory. At the age of 15 years, five months, 18 days, Valencia became the youngest goalscorer in USL history, surpassing the record previously set by Alphonso Davies.

=== Inter Miami ===
On December 18, 2020, it was announced that Valencia would join Inter Miami in 2021 as their first ever homegrown player. Valencia's contract option was declined by Miami following their 2024 season.
