= Wilfredo Rivera (footballer) =

Puerto Rican footballer (born 2003)

Personal information
- Full name: Wilfredo Aramat Rivera Cepeda
- Date of birth: 14 October 2003 (age 23)
- Place of birth: San Juan, Puerto Rico
- Height: 1.68 m (5 ft 6 in)
- Positions: Winger; forward

Team information
- Current team: Barracas Central
- Number: 23

Youth career
- 2008–2010: Academia Quintana
- 2010–2017: Clay County SC
- 2017–2018: Jacksonville FC
- 2018–2020: Orlando City

Senior career*
| Years | Team | Apps | (Gls) |
| 2020–2021 | Orlando City B | 15 | (3) |
| 2021–2023 | Orlando City | 0 | (0) |
| 2022 | → Orlando City B (loan) | 10 | (1) |
| 2022 | → Indy Eleven (loan) | 11 | (0) |
| 2023 | → Orlando City B (loan) | 22 | (3) |
| 2024 | Orlando City B | 23 | (5) |
| 2025 | Greater Orlando SA | | |
| 2025 | Academia Quintana | | |
| 2026– | Barracas Central | 0 | (0) |

International career^{‡}
| 2018 | United States U16 | | |
| 2019 | Puerto Rico U17 | 3 | (0) |
| 2021–2022 | Puerto Rico U20 | 5 | (3) |
| 2021– | Puerto Rico | 28 | (11) |
- * Club domestic league appearances and goals as of 17:56, 26 December 2025 (UTC) ‡ National team caps and goals as of 19:25, 16 November 2026 (UTC)

Wilfredo Aramat Rivera Cepeda (born 14 October 2003) is a Puerto Rican professional footballer who plays as a winger for Primera División club Barracas Central and the Puerto Rico national team.

== Club career ==
=== Youth ===
Rivera grew up in the Quintana barrio of San Juan, Puerto Rico, and began playing football for the Academia Quintana team. His family moved to Florida in the mainland United States in 2010 and he joined Clay County Soccer Club. After seven seasons at Clay County SC, Rivera moved to Jacksonville FC before joining the SIMA/Orlando City DA program at Montverde Academy.

=== Senior ===
In March 2020, Rivera signed an academy contract with Orlando City B, Orlando City's USL League One affiliate. He made his debut in the season opener on August 1, 2020, starting against South Georgia Tormenta and scored his first goal for the club the following week in a 2–0 victory over New England Revolution II. He started in all 15 games and finished the season as the team's top scorer with three goals.

Having originally committed to playing college soccer for South Florida Bulls beginning fall 2021, Rivera joined the Orlando City senior team's preseason camp ahead of the 2021 season and on 22 March 2021, signed a professional three-year homegrown contract. He became the club's ninth homegrown and second youngest player to sign a first-team contract after Tommy Redding in 2014.

Rivera continued to play for Orlando City B during the inaugural 2022 MLS Next Pro season until 25 July 2022, when he joined USL Championship side Indy Eleven on loan for the remainder of the season. In December 2023, as part of the end of season roster moves, it was announced Rivera had his option declined and released as a free agent.

In early 2025, Rivera spent time with Greater Orlando Soccer Academy in the United Premier Soccer League. On 1 May 2025, Rivera signed with Liga Puerto Rico club Academia Quintana. On 26 July, Rivera scored his first international goal in a 5–0 win over Rovers SC in the opening group stage match of the 2025 CFU Cup Shield. Academia Quintana would ultimately fail to get out of the group stage after tying Academy Eagles on points and goal difference, but lost out on first place to fair play rules. On 12 December, Academia Quintana defeated Puerto Rico Surf SC 1–0 in the Liga Puerto Rico Apertura final.

On 23 December 2025, Rivera signed with Primera División club Barracas Central after impressing against the Argentine national team over international break. With his signing, Rivera became the first Puerto Rican to play in the division.

== International ==
In September 2018, Rivera was called up to the United States under-16 training camp.

Rivera made his Puerto Rico under-17 debut in 2019 during 2019 CONCACAF U-17 Championship qualifying and later represented the team during the knockout stage, starting in a 2–1 loss to Mexico in the Round of 16.

On 19 January 2021, he made his senior debut with Puerto Rico as an 80th-minute substitute in a friendly 1–0 win over Dominican Republic.

== Career statistics ==
=== Club ===
As of 12 December 2025

| Club | Season | League | | | National cup | | Playoffs (Note: Includes MLS Next Pro playoffs and Liga Puerto Rico Apertura playoffs) | | Continental (Note: Includes CFU Club Shield) | | Other | | Total | |
| Club | Season | Division | Apps | Goals | Apps | Goals | Apps | Goals | Apps | Goals | Apps | Goals | Apps | Goals |
|---|---|---|---|---|---|---|---|---|---|---|---|---|---|---|
| Orlando City B | 2020 | USL League One | 15 | 3 | — | | — | | — | | — | | 15 | 3 |
| Orlando City | 2021 | Major League Soccer | 0 | 0 | 0 | 0 | 0 | 0 | — | | 0 | 0 | 0 | 0 |
| Orlando City | 2022 | Major League Soccer | 0 | 0 | 0 | 0 | 0 | 0 | — | | — | | 0 | 0 |
| Orlando City | 2023 | Major League Soccer | 0 | 0 | 0 | 0 | 0 | 0 | 0 | 0 | 0 | 0 | 0 | 0 |
| Orlando City | Total | | 0 | 0 | 0 | 0 | 0 | 0 | 0 | 0 | 0 | 0 | 0 | 0 |
| Orlando City B (loan) | 2022 | MLS Next Pro | 10 | 1 | — | | — | | — | | — | | 10 | 1 |
| Orlando City B (loan) | 2023 | MLS Next Pro | 22 | 3 | — | | 1 | 0 | — | | — | | 23 | 3 |
| Orlando City B | 2024 | MLS Next Pro | 23 | 5 | — | | 1 | 0 | — | | — | | 24 | 5 |
| Orlando City B | Total | | 70 | 12 | 0 | 0 | 1 | 0 | 0 | 0 | 0 | 0 | 72 | 12 |
| Indy Eleven | 2022 | USL Championship | 11 | 0 | 0 | 0 | — | | — | | — | | 11 | 0 |
| Barracas Central | 2026 | Primera División | 0 | 0 | 0 | 0 | — | | 0 | 0 | — | | 0 | 0 |
| Career total | | | 92 | 23 | 0 | 0 | 1 | 0 | 2 | 1 | 0 | 0 | 72 | 16 |

=== International ===
As of match played 16 November 2026

Appearances and goals by national team and year
| National team | Year | Apps | Goals |
|---|---|---|---|
| Puerto Rico | 2021 | 4 | 0 |
| Puerto Rico | 2022 | 0 | 0 |
| Puerto Rico | 2023 | 7 | 3 |
| Puerto Rico | 2024 | 7 | 2 |
| Puerto Rico | 2025 | 3 | 0 |
| Puerto Rico | 2026 | 7 | 6 |
| Total | | 28 | 11 |

Scores and results list Puerto Rico's goal tally first, score column indicates score after each Rivera goal.

List of international goals scored by Wilfredo Rivera
| No. | Date | Venue | Opponent | Score | Result | Competition |
|---|---|---|---|---|---|---|
| 1 | 18 November 2023 | ABFA Technical Center, Piggotts, Antigua and Barbuda | Antigua and Barbuda | 1–0 | 3–2 | 2023–24 CONCACAF Nations League B |
| 2 | 18 November 2023 | ABFA Technical Center, Piggotts, Antigua and Barbuda | Antigua and Barbuda | 3–2 | 3–2 | 2023–24 CONCACAF Nations League B |
| 3 | 21 November 2023 | Juan Ramón Loubriel Stadium, Bayamón, Puerto Rico | Bahamas | 6–1 | 6–1 | 2023–24 CONCACAF Nations League B |
| 4 | 11 June 2024 | Juan Ramón Loubriel Stadium, Bayamón, Puerto Rico | Anguilla | 3–0 | 8–0 | 2026 FIFA World Cup qualification |
| 5 | 11 June 2024 | Juan Ramón Loubriel Stadium, Bayamón, Puerto Rico | Anguilla | 6–0 | 8–0 | 2026 FIFA World Cup qualification |
| 6 | 25 March 2026 | Juan Ramón Loubriel Stadium, Bayamón, Puerto Rico | Guam | 1–0 | 4–0 | 2026 FIFA Series |
| 7 | 25 March 2026 | Juan Ramón Loubriel Stadium, Bayamón, Puerto Rico | Guam | 3–0 | 4–0 | 2026 FIFA Series |
| 8 | 27 September 2026 | Windsor Park, Roseau, Dominica | Dominica | 2–0 | 2–0 | 2026–27 CONCACAF Nations League B |
| 9 | 1 October 2026 | Mayagüez Athletics Stadium, Mayagüez, Puerto Rico | Cayman Islands | 2–0 | 3–0 | 2026–27 CONCACAF Nations League B |
| 10 | 13 November 2026 | Leonora National Track and Field Centre, Georgetown, Guyana | Dominica | 2–0 | 4–2 | 2026–27 CONCACAF Nations League B |
| 11 | 16 November 2026 | Leonora National Track and Field Centre, Georgetown, Guyana | Guyana | 2–3 | 2–4 | 2026–27 CONCACAF Nations League B |

== Honours ==
Academia Quintana

- Liga Puerto Rico Apertura: 2024–25
