= Mateo Rodas =

Colombian footballer (born 1998)

Personal information
- Full name: Daniel Mateo Rodas Jiménez
- Date of birth: 11 January 1998 (age 28)
- Place of birth: Bogotá, Colombia
- Height: 1.86 m (6 ft 1 in)
- Position: Centre back

Team information
- Current team: La Equidad
- Number: 4

Youth career
- –2016: Deportivo Cali

Senior career*
Years	Team	Apps	(Gls)
2017	Deportivo Cali	0	(0)
2018	Barranquilla	12	(0)
2019	Tigres	28	(3)
2020	Orlando City B	12	(1)
2021–2022	Patriotas	54	(3)
2023	Alianza Petrolera	8	(0)
2024	Patriotas	32	(1)
2025	Once Caldas	5	(0)
2025–	La Equidad	17	(1)
- * Club domestic league appearances and goals as of 12 December 2025

Daniel Mateo Rodas Jiménez (born 11 January 1998) is a Colombian footballer who plays as a centre back for La Equidad.

== Career ==
Following a career in his native Colombia with Deportivo Cali, Barranquilla and Tigres, Rodas moved to the United States in 2020, joining USL League One side Orlando City B. He was released at the end of the season.
