= Franklin Carabalí =

Ecuadorian footballer (born 1996)

Personal information
- Full name: Franklin Alexander Carabalí Carabalí
- Date of birth: 27 June 1996 (age 30)
- Place of birth: Quito, Ecuador
- Height: 6 ft 0 in (1.83 m)
- Position: Defender

Team information
- Current team: C.D. El Nacional

Youth career
- Universidad Católica

Senior career*
Years	Team	Apps	(Gls)
2014–2019	Universidad Católica	11	(0)
2016	→ América de Quito (loan)	?	(?)
2018	→ América de Quito (loan)	?	(1)
2019–2020	América de Quito	21	(0)
2020	Orlando City B	10	(0)
2021–2024	Aucas	6	(0)
2022–2023	→ Mushuc Runa (loan)	10	(0)
- * Club domestic league appearances and goals as of 18:23, 10 August 2021 (UTC)

Franklin Alexander Carabalí Carabalí (born 27 June 1996) is an Ecuadorian footballer who plays as a defender for C.D. El Nacional in Serie A.
