= Ricky Lopez-Espin =

American soccer player (born 1995)

Personal information
- Date of birth: December 2, 1995 (age 30)
- Place of birth: Miami, Florida, United States
- Height: 1.90 m (6 ft 3 in)
- Position: Forward

College career
Years	Team	Apps	(Gls)
2014–2017	Creighton Bluejays	74	(30)

Senior career*
Years	Team	Apps	(Gls)
2016	Lane United	4	(0)
2017	Tampa Bay Rowdies U23	2	(1)
2018	Real Salt Lake	1	(0)
2018	→ Real Monarchs (loan)	8	(0)
2019	Lansing Ignite	8	(3)
2020	Fort Lauderdale CF	16	(7)
Total		39	(11)
- * Club domestic league appearances and goals

Ricky Lopez-Espin (born December 2, 1995) is an American former soccer player.

== Career ==
=== College ===
Lopez-Espin spent his entire college career at Creighton University. He made a total of 74 appearances for the Bluejays and tallied 30 goals and 7 assists. During his senior year at Creighton, he was named USC First Team All-Great Lakes Region, Big East Conference Player of the Year, and First Team All-Big East Conference.

While at college, Lopez-Espin played for Premier Development League sides Lane United and Tampa Bay Rowdies U23.

=== Professional ===
On January 19, 2018, Lopez-Espin was selected 33rd overall in the 2018 MLS SuperDraft by the Real Salt Lake.

On March 24, he made his professional debut for Salt Lake's USL affiliate club Real Monarchs, appearing as an 85th-minute substitute in a 3–2 victory over Tulsa Roughnecks.

Lopez-Espin was released by Salt Lake at the end of their 2018 season. On December 12, 2018, Lopez-Espin was selected by Los Angeles FC in the MLS Waiver Draft.

On March 21, 2019, Lopez-Espin signed for Lansing Ignite. On April 8, Lopez-Espin was suspended for four matches after he made an anti-LGBT comment during a match against the Greenville Triumph. On June 26, 2019, Lopez and Lansing mutually terminated his contract.

Lopez-Espin spent a single season in USL League One with Fort Lauderdale CF during their 2020 season.
