= Clube Atlético Barra da Tijuca =

Brazilian football club

Barra da Tijuca
- Full name: Clube Atlético da Barra da Tijuca
- Nickname(s): Tricolor da Zona Oeste; Tricolor da Barra
- Founded: July 8, 2010
- Ground: Divino, Rio de Janeiro–RJ, Brazil
- Capacity: 1.000
- President: Adílson Oliveira Coutinho Filho
- Head Coach: Eduardo Hungaro
Home colours	Away colours

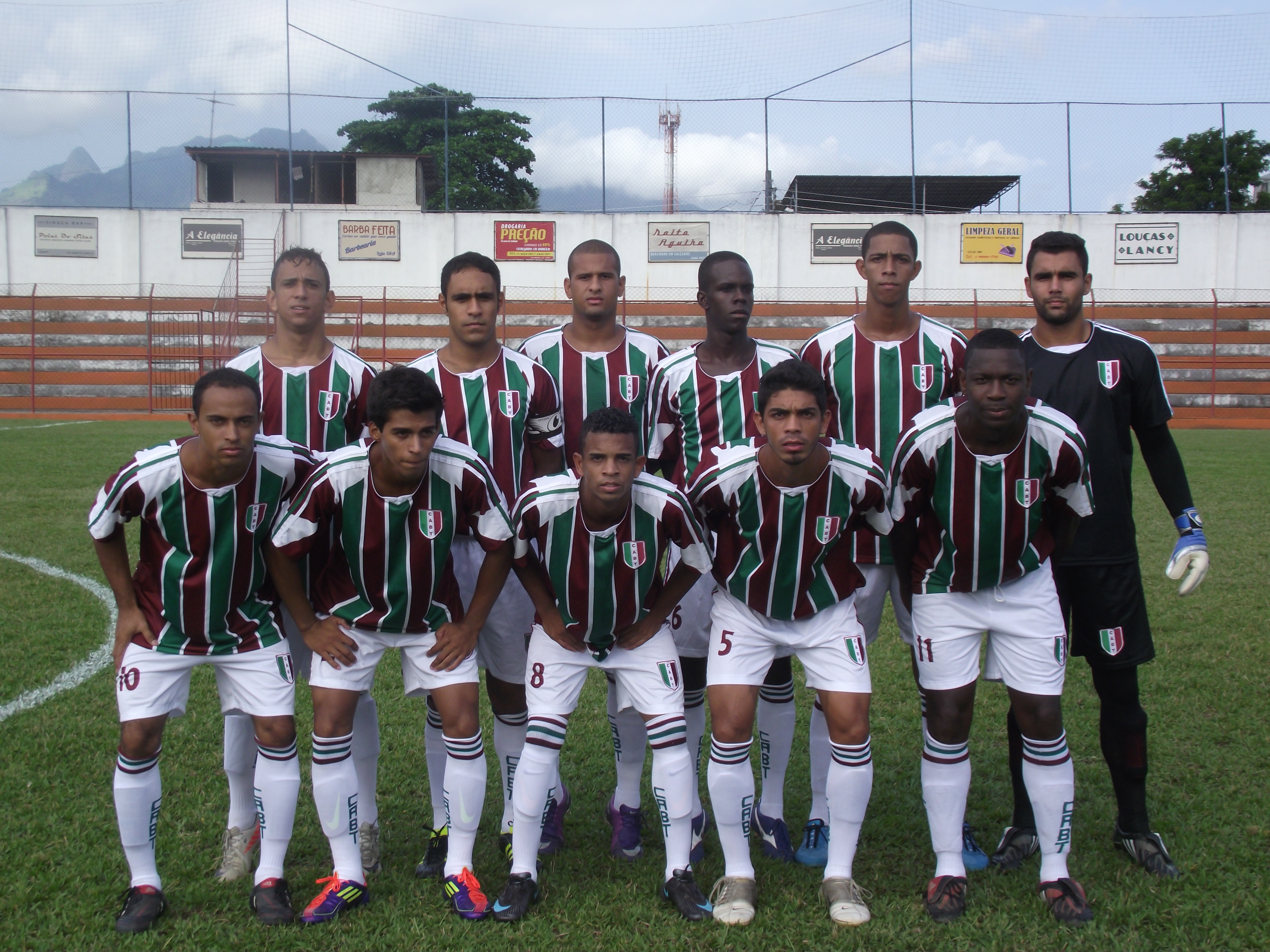
Team photo from the 2012 season

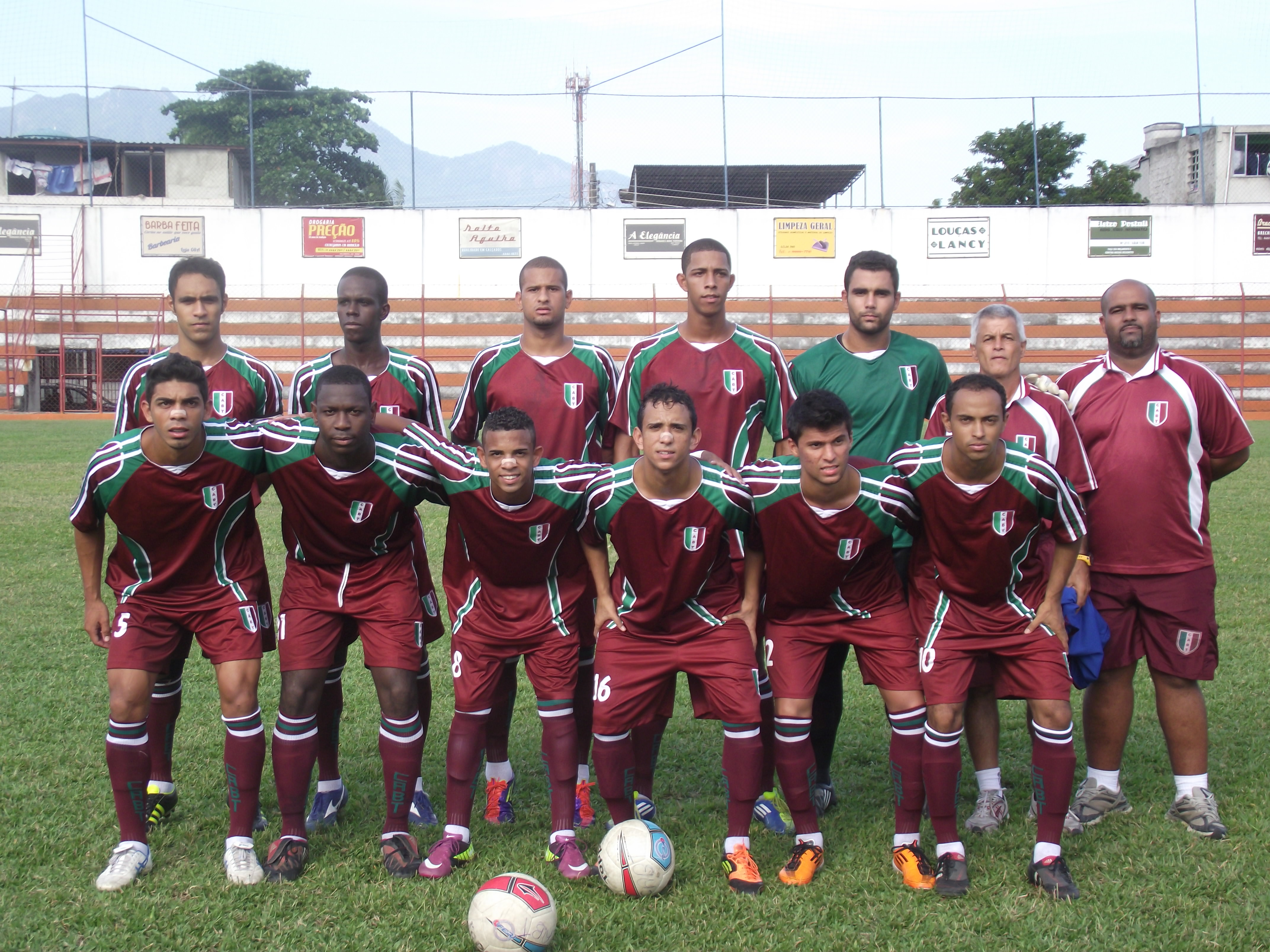
Second uniform of Barra da Tijuca in 2012

Clube Atlético da Barra da Tijuca, commonly known as Barra da Tijuca, is a Brazilian football club based in Rio de Janeiro, Rio de Janeiro state, adopting similar colors and team kits as Fluminense

== Stadium ==
Clube Atlético da Barra da Tijuca play their home games at Estádio Eustáquio Marques. The stadium has a maximum capacity of 1.000 people.

== Honours ==
- Campeonato Carioca Série B2
  - Winners (1): 2022
- Torneio Extra Capital
  - Winners (1): 2014
