= Inter Miami CF II =

American professional soccer club

- Full name: Inter Miami CF II
- Founded: October 9, 2019; 6 years ago, as Fort Lauderdale CF
- Stadium: Chase Stadium; Fort Lauderdale, Florida
- Capacity: 21,000
- Owner: Inter Miami CF
- Head coach: Cristian Ledesma
- League: MLS Next Pro
- 2024: 3rd, Eastern Conference; Playoffs: First Round
- Website: intermiamicf.com/ii
Home colors	Away colors

Inter Miami Club de Fútbol II, commonly known as Inter Miami CF II, is an American professional soccer club based in Fort Lauderdale, Florida, that plays in the MLS Next Pro, the third-tier of American soccer. The club was established on February 1, 2020 as Fort Lauderdale CF, before changing to their current name in 2022 and is the reserve team of Major League Soccer club Inter Miami CF.

== History ==
On October 9, 2019, it was announced by Inter Miami of Major League Soccer, that they would be fielding a reserve side in USL League One in 2020. A few months later, on February 1, 2020, the club announced the team's name as Fort Lauderdale CF and that they would be playing at the main team's temporary Inter Miami CF Stadium.

The club announced on December 6, 2021, that it was joining the inaugural 21-team MLS Next Pro season starting in 2022. They changed their name to Inter Miami CF II.

== Stadium ==
Chase Stadium is a soccer stadium in Fort Lauderdale, Florida, built on the site of the former Lockhart Stadium. The 21,000-seat stadium and training facility serves as the team headquarters and training ground for Inter Miami CF, its youth academy, and Inter Miami CF II. The stadium will house the team as well as the first team for the first two seasons while Nu Stadium was under construction.

== Players and staff ==
=== Current squad ===
As of March 30, 2026

No.	Pos.	Nation	Player
26	DF	USA	Tyler Hall
44	DF	USA	Nicolas Almeida
47	MF	ISR	Idoh Zeltzer-Zubida
48	MF	ARG	Matías Acevedo
51	DF	USA	Samuel Basabe
52	FW	VEN	Diego Rey
53	DF	ARG	Alejo Ristano
54	FW	HAI	Lovend's Delinois
55	DF	USA	Ian Urkidi
58	DF	USA	Nash Dearmin
59	MF	USA	Preston Plambeck
61	GK	USA	Matias Marin
62	DF	DOM	Israel Boatwright
63	DF	USA	Sloan Morrison
64	MF	USA	Matteo DePaula
65	MF	USA	Naej Desravins
66	MF	USA	Joseph Convers
67	MF	USA	Arturo Querales
68	MF	PLE	Mohammed Jamhour
70	DF	USA	Daniel Sumalla
71	DF	HON	Leandro Padilla
72	DF	ESP	Theo Vorenkamp
73	MF	USA	Mario Stoka
74	FW	USA	Diego Matos
76	DF	USA	Cesar Abadía-Reda
80	FW	ARG	Mateo Dulce Saja
82	GK	USA	Max Ponikarovsky
83	DF	USA	Rondell White
85	DF	USA	Matthew Perez
86	FW	USA	Zidane Cadet
87	DF	CUW	Jerremy Ortela
88	MF	USA	Alexander Shaw
89	FW	USA	Matthias Vieux
90	MF	BOL	Mark Rodríguez
91	DF	HON	Lesther Garcia
92	GK	USA	Lucas Barker
92	GK	USA	Alexander Padilla

Signed to first team contract with Inter Miami
Inter Miami Academy player

=== Coaching staff ===
As of March 4, 2025

Coaching staff
(Argentina) Cristian Ledesma	Head coach
(Bolivia) Diter Alquiza	Goalkeeper coach
Sport management and organization
(Argentina) Gonzalo Higuaín	Player Development Coach
(Argentina) Lucas Scaglia	Performance Analyst

=== Head coaches record ===
As of September 20, 2026

Name	Nationality	From	To	P	W	D	L	GF	GA	Win%
Jason Kreis	United States	February 15, 2020	March 16, 2021	16	4	3	9	19	28	25.00
Darren Powell	England	March 16, 2021	January 6, 2023	52	18	12	22	80	98	34.62
Federico Higuaín	Argentina	January 6, 2023	January 29, 2025	57	19	12	26	89	119	33.33
Cristian Ledesma	Argentina	March 4, 2025	Present	57	10	10	37	74	148	17.54

== Statistics and records ==
=== Season-by-season ===
As of October 6, 2025

Fort Lauderdale CF
Season	USL League One								Playoffs	Top Scorer	
Season	P	W	D	L	GF	GA	Pts	Position	Playoffs	Player	Goals
2020	16	4	3	9	19	28	15	10th	Did not qualify	(United States) Ricky Lopez-Espin	7
2021	28	8	7	13	40	49	31	10th	Did not qualify	(Canada) Shaan Hundal	11

Inter Miami CF II
Season	MLS Next Pro									Playoffs	Top Scorer	
Season	P	W	D	L	GF	GA	Pts	Conference	Overall	Playoffs	Player	Goals
2022	24	10	5	9	40	49	36	6th, Eastern	11th	Did not qualify	(Haiti) Shanyder Borgelin	14
2023	28	5	6	17	34	68	22	13th, Eastern	27th	Did not qualify	(United States) Lawson Sunderland	5
2024	28	14	6	8	53	45	48	3rd, Eastern	6th	First Round	(Northern Ireland) Ryan Carmichael	9
2025	28	6	6	16	40	72	25	14th, Eastern	27th	Did not qualify	(Argentina) Mateo Saja	12

=== Team records ===
As of February 7, 2026

==== Most goals ====
Rank	Player	Seasons	Goals
1	(Canada) Shaan Hundal	2021–2022	16
2	(Haiti) Shanyder Borgelin	2022–2024	15
3	(Argentina) Mateo Saja	2024–	14
4	(United States) Yuval Cohen	2024–2025	12
5	(Argentina) Dániel Pintér	2024–	10
6	(Northern Ireland) Ryan Carmichael	2024	9
6	(United States) Lawson Sunderland	2022–2024	9
6	(United States) Idoh Zelzer-Zubida	2024–	9
9	(England) Mitchell Curry	2021	8
10	(Brazil) Leo Afonso	2024–2025	7
10	(Dominican Republic) Edison Azcona	2020–2023	7
10	(United States) Ricky Lopez-Espin	2020	7

==== Most assists ====
Rank	Player	Seasons	Assists
1	(United States) Nykolas Sessock	2023–2024	11
2	(England) Romeo Beckham	2021–2022	10
3	(United States) Idoh Zelzer-Zubida	2024–	8
4	(United States) George Acosta	2021–2022	7
4	(Greece) Noah Allen	2020–2024	7
4	(Northern Ireland) Ryan Carmichael	2024	7
4	(United States) Alejandro Flores	2023–	7
4	(United States) Santiago Morales	2023–	7
9	(Canada) Shaan Hundal	2021–2022	6
9	(Cuba) Dairon Reyes	2020–2024	6

==== Most appearances ====
Rank	Player	Seasons	Appearances
1	(United States) Tyler Hall	2022–	71
2	(United States) Ricardo Montenegro	2023–2025	68
3	(United States) Cesar Abadia-Reda	2023–	63
4	(Venezuela) Abel Caputo	2021–2023	62
4	(United States) Alejandro Flores	2023–	62
6	(United States) Nykolas Sessock	2023–2024	55
7	(Greece) Noah Allen	2020–2024	53
7	(United States) Braxton Taghvai-Najib	2021–2023	53
9	(United States) Lawson Sunderland	2022–2024	51
10	(Canada) Shaan Hundal	2021–2022	48

==== Most minutes ====
Rank	Player	Seasons	Minutes
1	(United States) Tyler Hall	2022–	5975
2	(United States) Ricardo Montenegro	2023–2025	5602
3	(Venezuela) Abel Caputo	2021–2023	4680
4	(Greece) Noah Allen	2020–2024	4571
5	(United States) Nykolas Sessock	2023–2024	4558
6	(United States) Lawson Sunderland	2022–2024	4172
7	(United States) Alejandro Flores	2023–	4030
8	(United States) Cesar Abadia-Reda	2023–	3934
9	(Cuba) Modesto Méndez	2020–2023	3805
10	(Argentina) Giovanni Ferraina	2024–2025	3678

== See also ==
- Inter Miami CF
- USL League One
- Fort Lauderdale Strikers
