= 2014 PDL season =

USL Premier Development League
- Season: 2014
- Champions: Michigan Bucks (2nd Title)
- Regular Season Champions: Des Moines Menace (2nd Title)
- Matches: 443
- Goals: 1,381 (3.12 per match)
- Best player: (Bosnia and Herzegovina) Dzenan Catic Michigan Bucks
- Top goalscorer: (Bosnia and Herzegovina) Dzenan Catic Michigan Bucks (16 Goals)
- Best goalkeeper: (United States) Billy Thompson FC Tucson
- Biggest home win: LIR 8, NJL 0 (July 12)
- Biggest away win: VIC 7, LAU 0 (June 22)
- Highest scoring: LIR 8, NJL 0 (July 12); KWU 6, TOR 2 (July 16); WMA 7, WES 1 (July 19)
- Longest winning run: 10, Seacoast United (June 8 - July 19)
- Longest unbeaten run: 14, Ocala Stampede (June 5 - July 27)
- Longest winless run: 14, Vermont Voltage (entire season)
- Longest losing run: 11, NJ-LUSO Parma (May 26 - July 20)
- Highest attendance: 8,207 POR vs. PUG (May 30)
- Lowest attendance: 16 CHI vs. TOR (June 1)
- Average attendance: 590 (375 of 443 games reported)

The 2014 USL Premier Development League season was the 20th season of the PDL. The regular season began on May 3 and ended July 20. The regular season was followed by a postseason tournament of conference winners to determine the league's champion. Seven teams were added to the league and seven left, keeping the total number of teams in the league at 64 across 10 divisions with the addition of the Mountain Division. The Austin Aztex were the defending champions.

== Changes from 2013 ==
=== New teams ===
Seven new clubs joined the PDL in 2014.

Team name	Metro area	Location	Previous affiliation
(Quebec) Montreal Impact U23	Greater Montreal	Montreal, Quebec	CSL
(Pennsylvania) Pittsburgh Riverhounds U23	Pittsburgh metropolitan area	Pittsburgh, Pennsylvania	expansion
(Ohio) Cincinnati Dutch Lions	Greater Cincinnati	Cincinnati, Ohio	expansion
(New Mexico) Albuquerque Sol FC	Albuquerque metropolitan area	Albuquerque, New Mexico	expansion
(Nevada) Las Vegas Mobsters	Las Vegas–Paradise, Nevada	Las Vegas, Nevada	expansion
(Oregon) Lane United FC	Lane County, Oregon	Eugene, Oregon	expansion
(California) San Jose Earthquakes U-23	Santa Clara County, California	San Jose, California	expansion

=== Name Changes ===
- Fort Lauderdale Schulz Academy became Floridians FC.
- West Texas Sockers became Midland/Odessa Sockers.
- NJ-LUSO Rangers FC became NJ-LUSO Parma.
- North Sound SeaWolves became Puget Sound Gunners FC.
- OC Blues Strikers FC became OC Pateadores Blues

=== Folding/moving ===
- Central Jersey Spartans - Folded
- El Paso Patriots - Folded
- Kansas City Brass - Folded
- Oklahoma City FC - Withdrew - joined NPSL, new team to play in the 2015 NASL
- Ottawa Fury - Folded, new Ottawa Fury FC team plays in the NASL
- VSI Tampa Bay FC - Folded
- Virginia Beach Piranhas - Folded
- Chicago Inferno - Folded mid-season

=== Divisions ===
The schedule and divisions were announced January 31 with each team to play a 14-game schedule. The Western Conference was split into three divisions (Northwest, Southwest and Mountain).

== Standings ==
2014 Premier Development League standings.

Key to colours in group tables
Team in position to win Division Title
Team in position to qualify for playoff berth

Note: The first tie-breaker in PDL standings is head-to-head results between teams tied on points, which is why some teams with inferior goal differences finish ahead in the standings.

=== Central Conference ===
==== Great Lakes Division ====
Pos	Team	Pld	W	L	T	GF	GA	GD	Pts
1	Michigan Bucks	14	9	2	3	38	8	+30	30
2	K-W United FC	14	8	3	3	26	20	+6	27
3	Chicago Fire Premier	14	7	5	2	21	20	+1	23
4	Forest City London	14	6	4	4	32	25	+7	22
5	Toronto Lynx	14	2	9	3	15	35	−20	9
6	Pittsburgh Riverhounds U23	14	2	11	1	13	37	−24	7

==== Heartland Division ====
Pos	Team	Pld	W	L	T	GF	GA	GD	Pts
1	Des Moines Menace (R)	14	12	1	1	32	7	+25	37
2	St. Louis Lions	14	6	4	4	18	16	+2	22
3	Thunder Bay Chill	14	6	7	1	22	17	+5	19
4	Springfield Demize	13	4	5	4	8	11	−3	16
5	WSA Winnipeg	14	2	10	2	10	33	−23	8
6	Chicago Inferno (Note: Chicago Inferno withdrew from the league on June 20.)	5	0	3	2	1	7	−6	2

(R) Regular Season Champions

=== Eastern Conference ===
==== Mid Atlantic Division ====
Pos	Team	Pld	W	L	T	GF	GA	GD	Pts
1	Jersey Express	14	10	1	3	45	15	+30	33
2	Reading United AC	14	9	1	4	30	12	+18	31
3	Long Island Rough Riders	14	8	2	4	26	13	+13	28
4	Ocean City Nor'easters	14	7	5	2	24	24	0	23
5	Baltimore Bohemians	14	6	6	2	23	21	+2	20
6	Northern Virginia Royals	14	3	9	2	17	30	−13	11
7	F.A. Euro	14	3	10	1	16	36	−20	10
8	NJ-LUSO Parma	14	1	13	0	10	40	−30	3

==== Northeast Division ====
Pos	Team	Pld	W	L	T	GF	GA	GD	Pts
1	Seacoast United Phantoms	14	11	1	2	28	7	+21	35
2	Connecticut FC Azul	14	9	2	3	27	13	+14	30
3	Western Mass Pioneers	14	8	4	2	33	16	+17	26
4	Montreal Impact U23	14	7	5	2	26	17	+9	23
5	Real Boston Rams	14	6	6	2	21	26	−5	20
6	GPS Portland Phoenix	14	4	9	1	19	32	−13	13
7	Westchester Flames	14	2	10	2	11	36	−25	8
8	Vermont Voltage	14	0	10	4	9	27	−18	4

==== South Atlantic Division ====
Pos	Team	Pld	W	L	T	GF	GA	GD	Pts
1	West Virginia Chaos	14	7	3	4	24	17	+7	25
2	Cincinnati Dutch Lions	14	6	4	4	27	20	+7	22
3	King's Warriors	14	6	4	4	23	20	+3	22
4	Carolina Dynamo	14	6	6	2	21	26	−5	20
5	SC United Bantams	14	4	8	2	19	23	−4	14
6	River City Rovers	14	3	7	4	19	27	−8	13

=== Southern Conference ===
==== Mid South Division ====
Pos	Team	Pld	W	L	T	GF	GA	GD	Pts
1	Austin Aztex	14	11	1	2	37	11	+26	35
2	Laredo Heat	14	7	4	3	23	16	+7	24
3	Midland/Odessa Sockers	14	7	4	3	26	19	+7	24
4	Mississippi Brilla	14	3	7	4	20	32	−12	13
5	Houston Dutch Lions	14	1	10	3	12	37	−25	6

==== Southeast Division ====
Pos	Team	Pld	W	L	T	GF	GA	GD	Pts
1	Ocala Stampede	14	9	1	4	29	16	+13	31
2	SW Florida Adrenaline	14	7	2	5	27	14	+13	26
3	IMG Academy Bradenton	14	5	7	2	15	22	−7	17
4	Panama City Beach Pirates	14	4	6	4	23	27	−4	16
5	Orlando City U-23	14	2	7	5	16	23	−7	11
6	Floridians FC	14	2	7	5	14	23	−9	11

=== Western Conference ===
==== Mountain Division ====
Pos	Team	Pld	W	L	T	GF	GA	GD	Pts
1	FC Tucson	14	11	2	1	35	11	+24	34
2	BYU Cougars	14	7	4	3	23	25	−2	24
3	Albuquerque Sol FC	14	3	5	6	12	16	−4	15
4	Las Vegas Mobsters	14	4	9	1	17	31	−14	13
5	Real Colorado Foxes	14	2	8	4	12	18	−6	10

==== Northwest Division ====
Pos	Team	Pld	W	L	T	GF	GA	GD	Pts
1	Kitsap Pumas	14	9	1	4	25	9	+16	31
2	Victoria Highlanders (J)	14	8	3	3	32	18	+14	27
3	Vancouver Whitecaps FC U-23	14	8	3	3	34	19	+15	27
4	Portland Timbers U23's	14	5	4	5	20	20	0	20
5	Seattle Sounders FC U-23	14	5	7	2	18	20	−2	17
6	Washington Crossfire	14	3	6	5	18	22	−4	14
7	Puget Sound Gunners FC	14	3	9	2	9	31	−22	11
8	Lane United FC	14	2	10	2	10	27	−17	8

(J) Juan de Fuca Plate

==== Southwest Division ====
Pos	Team	Pld	W	L	T	GF	GA	GD	Pts
1	Ventura County Fusion	14	8	3	3	26	17	+9	27
2	Los Angeles Misioneros	14	7	2	5	28	17	+11	26
3	San Jose Earthquakes U-23	14	7	4	3	27	18	+9	24
4	Fresno Fuego	14	6	7	1	25	18	+7	19
5	OC Pateadores Blues	14	5	7	2	20	29	−9	17
6	Southern California Seahorses	14	1	12	1	14	41	−27	4

== Conference Championships ==
Participants in the four conference championships were determined according to the specific rules of each conference. In the two-division Central and Southern Conferences, the top two teams from each division meet in a conference final four. In the Eastern and Western Conferences, both of which are broken into three divisions, additional quarterfinal matches were required. In the Western Conference, two teams from the Northwest Division advanced to the conference final four: the division champion and the winner of a match between the division's second- and third-place teams. The first-place teams from the Mountain and Southwest divisions met the second-place teams of the other division to determine the final two participants. In the Eastern Conference the winner of a match between the Northeast and Mid-Atlantic divisions' second-place teams advanced to the final four along with the three division champions.

Inter-Divisional Playoff; Eastern Conference
MA2	Reading United	0
NE2	Connecticut FC Azul	3

Northwest Division Playoff; Western Conference
NW2	Victoria Highlanders	2
NW3	Vancouver Whitecaps U-23	7

Inter-Divisional Playoff; Western Conference
MT1	FC Tucson	2
SW2	Los Angeles Misioneros	1

Inter-Divisional Playoff; Western Conference
SW1	Ventura County Fusion	1
MT2	BYU Cougars	0

=== Eastern Conference Championship ===
July 22, 2014 1st Round	(Pennsylvania) Reading United	0–3	Connecticut FC Azul	John Gurski Stadium; West Lawn, Pennsylvania
7:30PM EDT	Campbell (yellow card) 58'	Report	Perry 29'; Taveras 36'; Weir 66'; Narro (yellow card) 70'	Attendance: 411; Referee: Jaroslaw Werel

July 26, 2014 Semifinal	(New Jersey) Jersey Express	2–0	Connecticut FC Azul	Lubetkin Field; Newark, New Jersey
5:00pm EDT	Hines 10' (yellow card) 78'; Eze 57'; Viaggio (yellow card) 65'	Report	Kinne (yellow card) 90'	Attendance: 175; Referee: Kris Larwa

July 26, 2014 Semifinal	(New Hampshire) Seacoast United Phantoms	0–2	West Virginia Chaos	Lubetkin Field; Newark, New Jersey
7:30pm EDT	Louchead (yellow card) 42'	Report	Smee 28'; Fabian (yellow card) 30'; Szabo 72' (yellow card) 82'	Referee: Jaime Herrera

July 27, 2014 Final	(New Jersey) Jersey Express	3–1	West Virginia Chaos	Lubetkin Field; Newark, New Jersey
5:00pm EDT	Viaggio (yellow card) 17'; Eze 30', 53'; Correa (yellow card) 52' (goal) 57' (pen.)	Report	Peters 45' (pen.); McDonald (yellow card) 63'; Wilson (yellow card) 66'; Szabo (yellow card) 69'; Smee (yellow card) 89'	Attendance: 107; Referee: Robert Sibiga

=== Central Conference Championship ===
July 25, 2014 Semifinal	Michigan Bucks	3–1 (a.e.t.)	(Missouri) St. Louis Lions	Valley Stadium; West Des Moines, Iowa
4:30pm CDT	Catic 13', 107'; Ben 93'; Dereis (yellow card) 98'	Report	Cojocov 10'; Matthews (yellow card) 45'; Edemba (yellow card) 81'; Walsh (yellow card) 119'	Referee: Trent Payne

July 25, 2014 Semifinal	(Iowa) Des Moines Menace	0–0 (a.e.t.) (4–3 p)	(Ontario) K-W United FC	Valley Stadium; West Des Moines, Iowa
7:30pm CDT	Fricke (yellow card) 7'	Report	Whiteman (yellow card) 26'; Robinson (yellow card) 69'; Keely (yellow card) 103'	Attendance: 3,679; Referee: Jeremy Uecker
	Penalties
	Hellmann (penalty missed); Bartlett (penalty scored); Macadam (penalty scored); Bales (penalty scored); Fricke (penalty scored)		(penalty scored) Murrell; (penalty scored) Keely; (penalty missed) Robinson; (penalty missed) Camargo; (penalty scored) Perea

July 26, 2014 Final	(Iowa) Des Moines Menace	0–2	Michigan Bucks	Valley Stadium; West Des Moines, Iowa
7:30pm CDT	López (yellow card) 71' (red card) 90'	Report	Goldsmith 14', 23'; Kaba (yellow card) 30'; Beresford (yellow card) 56'; Tribbett (yellow card) 79'	Referee: Brent Wilson

=== Southern Conference Championship ===
July 26, 2014 Semifinal	(Florida) Ocala Stampede	1–1 (a.e.t.) (5–3 p)	(Texas) Laredo Heat	House Park; Austin, Texas
5:00pm CDT	Hilton 87'; Knight (yellow card) 115'	Report	Luna 86'; Ferreira (yellow card) 99'	Referee: Ismael Elfarth
	Penalties
	Walmsley (penalty scored); Hilton (penalty scored); Ilic (penalty scored); Knight (penalty scored); Clay (penalty scored)		(penalty missed) Fernández; (penalty scored) Moreno; (penalty scored) Ibarra; (penalty scored) Hernández

July 26, 2014 Semifinal	(Texas) Austin Aztex	3–1	SW Florida Adrenaline	House Park; Austin, Texas
7:30pm CDT	Ambrose 15'; Jobe 57'; Cortes 87'	Report	Le Bras 37'; Wilks (yellow card) 89'	Attendance: 4,754; Referee: Ledzek Stalmach

July 27, 2014 Final	(Texas) Austin Aztex	0–2	(Florida) Ocala Stampede	House Park; Austin, Texas
7:30pm CDT	Seoane (yellow card) 48'; Perales (yellow card) 87'; Ambrose (yellow card) 89'	Report	Janneh 11'; Ilic 55'; Blandon (yellow card) 84'; Bailey (yellow card) 90+'	Attendance: 2,228; Referee: William Tomlinson

=== Western Conference Championship ===
Quarterfinal	(Washington (state)) Kitsap Pumas	v	Bye

July 16, 2014 Quarterfinal	(British Columbia) Victoria Highlanders	2–7	(British Columbia) Vancouver Whitecaps FC U-23	Royal Athletic Park; Victoria, British Columbia
7:00PM PDT	Mitrou (yellow card) 17'; Basso (yellow card) 38'; Barrett (yellow card) 45+'; T. Hughes (yellow card) 45+' (red card) 70'; Sturrock 51'; J. Hughes 54'; Rowley (yellow card) 79+'	Report; Report	Cook 6', 18' (pen.); Farahani 8'; Lakhan (yellow card) 23'; Levis (yellow card) 40'; Cousens 43', 72'; Froese 53', 85'	Attendance: 1,531; Referee: Darnell Smit

July 19, 2014 Quarterfinal	(California) Ventura County Fusion	1–0	(Utah) BYU Cougars	Peter Johann Memorial Field; Las Vegas, Nevada
8:55PM PDT	Chongo (yellow card) 40'; Stanley 41'	Report; Box score		Referee: Charles Farr

July 19, 2014 Quarterfinal	(Arizona) FC Tucson	2–1	(California) Los Angeles Misioneros	Peter Johann Memorial Field; Las Vegas, Nevada
6:30PM PDT	Kelly 28'; Volesky 29'; Phillips (yellow card) 51'; Velazco (yellow card) 53'; Ramos (yellow card) 72'	Report; Report	Christian (yellow card) 20'; Nwabueze 49'	Referee: C. Scott

July 25, 2014 Semifinal	(Washington (state)) Kitsap Pumas	3–3 (a.e.t.) (3–1 p)	(California) Ventura County Fusion	Kino Sports Complex; Tucson, Arizona
6:00pm MST	Keitz (yellow card) 19'; Gonzalez (yellow card) 41'; Catalano 45+'; Kelly (yellow card) 73'; Sanchez 83'; Chamberlain (yellow card) 86'; Danciu 98'	Report	Kiffe 10' (yellow card) 32'; Cazarez 15'; Keny-Guyer (yellow card) 41'; Argueta (yellow card) 82' (goal) 120+'; Alfaro (yellow card) 86'; Palacios (red card) 105+'	Referee: Matt Sternheim
	Penalties
	Keitz (penalty scored); Shelton (penalty scored); Sanchez (penalty missed); Danciu (penalty scored)		(penalty scored) Kiffe; (penalty missed) Alfaro; (penalty missed) Cazarez; (penalty missed) Colvey

July 25, 2014 Semifinal	(Arizona) FC Tucson	1–0	(British Columbia) Vancouver Whitecaps FC U-23	Kino Sports Complex; Tucson, Arizona
8:00pm MST	Phillips (yellow card) 49'; De Rada 90+'	Report	Stewart (yellow card) 15'; Farahani (yellow card) 48'	Attendance: 1,853; Referee: Charles Farr

July 26, 2014 Final	(Arizona) FC Tucson	0–3	(Washington (state)) Kitsap Pumas	Kino Sports Complex; Tucson, Arizona
7:30pm MST	Phillips (yellow card) 65'; Ramos (red card) 72'; Rookwood (red card) 90+'	Report	Keitz 7' (yellow card) 28'; DeZorzi (yellow card) 9'; Jensen (yellow card) 41'; Shelton (yellow card) 54'; Gonzalez 55'; Ortinau 66' (yellow card) 74'; Kelly (yellow card) 83'	Attendance: 1,411; Referee: Charles Farr

== Playoff Bracket ==
Conference Semifinals (July 25–26)
NE1	Seacoast United Phantoms	0
SA1	West Virginia Chaos	2
Eastern Conference
MA1	Jersey Express	2
NE2	Connecticut FC Azul	0
HL1	Des Moines Menace (PEN)	0 (4)
GL2	K-W United FC	0 (3)
Central Conference
GL1	Michigan Bucks (AET)	3
HL2	St. Louis Lions	1
MS1	Austin Aztex	3
SE2	SW Florida Adrenaline	1
Southern Conference
SE1	Ocala Stampede (PEN)	1 (5)
MS2	Laredo Heat	1 (4)
MT1	FC Tucson	1
NW3	Vancouver Whitecaps FC U-23	0
Western Conference
NW1	Kitsap Pumas (PEN)	3 (3)
SW1	Ventura County Fusion	3 (1)

Conference Finals (July 26–27)
SA1	West Virginia Chaos	1
MA1	Jersey Express	3
HL1	Des Moines Menace	0
GL1	Michigan Bucks	2
MS1	Austin Aztex	0
SE1	Ocala Stampede	2
MT1	FC Tucson	0
NW1	Kitsap Pumas	3

Semi-Finals (August 1)
MA1	Jersey Express	1
GL1	Michigan Bucks	2
SE1	Ocala Stampede	1
NW1	Kitsap Pumas	2

Championship (August 3)
GL1	Michigan Bucks	1
NW1	Kitsap Pumas	0

== PDL Championship ==
=== Semi-finals ===
August 1, 2014	(Washington (state)) Kitsap Pumas	2–1	(Florida) Ocala Stampede	Ultimate Soccer Arenas; Pontiac, Michigan
5:00pm EDT	Rivas 42'; Jensen (yellow card) 63'; Catalano (yellow card) 72'; Sanchez 89'	Report	Hilton 45'; Janneh (yellow card) 82'	Referee: Connor Williams

August 1, 2014	Michigan Bucks	2–1	(New Jersey) Jersey Express	Ultimate Soccer Arenas; Pontiac, Michigan
7:30pm EDT	Tribbett 54'; Steinberger 78'	Report	Eze 38'; Correa (yellow card) 50'; Martínez (yellow card) 79'; Caso (yellow card) 79'	Referee: Donovan Noocha

=== Championship ===
August 3, 2014	Michigan Bucks	1–0	(Washington (state)) Kitsap Pumas	Ultimate Soccer Arenas; Pontiac, Michigan
1:00pm EDT	Kolarac (yellow card) 35'; Owens 58'	Report; Report		Attendance: 1,200; Referee: Marc Lawrence

Championship MVP: (United States) Adam Grinwis, (MIB)

== Awards ==
- Most Valuable Player: (Bosnia and Herzegovina) Dzenan Catic, (MIB)
- Young (U21) Player of the Year: (United States) Ricardo Velazco (TUC)
- Coach of the Year: (United States) Michael Jeffries, (DMM)
- Goalkeeper of the Year: (United States) Billy Thompson, (TUC)

== All-League and All-Conference Teams ==
=== Eastern Conference ===
F: (Jamaica) Anthony Grant (SUP) *, (United States) Jeff McClure (CIN), (Brazil) Alencar Junior (WMA)
M: (Nigeria) Bolu Akinyode (NJL), (England) Shaun Foster (LIR), (Costa Rica) Walter Hines (JER)
D: (Ivory Coast) Kouassi Sylvain N’Guessan (JER), (United States) Jake Stovall (CIN), (England) Tom Wharf (LIR), (United States) Travis Brent (WVA)
G: (United States) Alex Bono (REA)

=== Central Conference ===
F: (Germany) Chris Hellmann (DMM) *, (Canada) Moses Danto (WSA), (Bosnia and Herzegovina) Dzenan Catic (MIB) *
M: (United States) Zach Steinberger (MIB) *, (United States) Drew Conner (CHI), (United States) Ralph Lundy (DMM)
D: (United States) Nolan Intermoia (THU) *, (United States) Ken Tribbett (MIB), (United States) Blake Jones (STL), (United States) Dan Keller (CHI)
G: (Japan) Yuta Nomura (SPR)

=== Western Conference ===
F: (Mexico) Javier Castro (LAM), (Canada) Cody Cook (VAN), (Grenada) Kharlton Belmar (POR)
M: (United States) Ricardo Velazco (TUC) *, (United States) Jose Cuevas (FRE) *, (United States) Bryan de la Fuente (LAM)
D: (Mexico) Ramon Martin Del Campo (SJO) *, (United States) James Kiffe (VEN), (United States) Cory Keitz (KIT) *, (Canada) Jordan Farahani (VAN)
G: (United States) Billy Thompson (TUC) *

=== Southern Conference ===
F: (Mexico) Jesus Cortes (AUS), (Serbia) Ilija Ilić (OCA), (United States) Adi Kavara (PAN)
M: (Belize) Tony Rocha (AUS), (United States) Michael Lightbourne (PAN), (The Gambia) Karamba Janneh (OCA)
D: (Mexico) Yair Hernandez (LAR) *, (United States) Walker Hume (MIO), (England) Ben Knight (OCA), (United States) Kalen Ryden (AUS)
G: (United States) Devin Cook (AUS)

* denotes All-League player
