= 2020 FC Tucson season =

FC Tucson
2020 season
- Owner: Phoenix Rising FC
- Manager: John Galas
- Stadium: Kino North Stadium
- USL1 2020 season: 6th
- USL1 Playoffs: Did not qualify
- Top goalscorer: Shak Adams; Josh Coan (4)
- Biggest win: 4–1 (Aug. 18 at Orlando City B)
- Biggest defeat: 0–2 (Sept. 12 vs. North Texas SC)
Home colors	Away colors

The 2020 FC Tucson season was the ninth season in the soccer team's history and their second in USL League One, a league in the third division of American soccer. FC Tucson, as a child club of Phoenix Rising FC of USL Championship, are barred from participating in the 2020 U.S. Open Cup. FC Tucson play their home games at Kino North Stadium, located in Tucson, Arizona, United States.

== Club ==
=== Roster ===
As of September 6, 2020

No.	Position	Nation	Player
1	GK	MEX	Carlos Merancio
2	MF	USA	Darryl Longdon
3	DF	ARG	Jonathan Caparelli
4	DF	USA	Jordan Hill
5	MF	CRC	Esteban Calvo
6	DF	BRA	Elivelton Oliveira de Lima (on loan from FC Cascavel)
7	MF	ESP	Roberto Alarcón
9	FW	USA	Azaad Liadi
10	FW	ENG	Charlie Dennis
11	MF	USA	Josh Coan
13	GK	USA	Rafael Guerrero
14	MF	ESP	Manuel Ferriol
16	DF	GER	Samuel Biek
17	MF	USA	Gio Magaña-Rivera
19	FW	USA	Giovanni Godoy
20	DF	NIR	Niall Logue
21	DF	USA	Charlie Booth
23	MF	USA	Erik Virgen
26	DF	USA	A. J. Valenzuela
33	DF	USA	Tommy Silva
44	MF	SKN	Raheem Somersall
50	FW	TTO	Darius Lewis
77	FW	USA	Shak Adams
95	MF	JAM	Ramone Howell
99	GK	JAM	Amal Knight (on loan from San Diego Loyal)

USL Academy Contract.

=== Coaching staff ===
Name	Position
(United States) John Galas	Head coach
(United States) Jon Pearlman	Assistant coach
(United States) Alex Rangel	Goalkeeper coach

=== Front Office Staff ===
Name	Position
(United States) Amanda Powers	President
(United States) Jon Pearlman	Director of Soccer Operations

== Competitions ==
=== Exhibitions ===
February 28, 2020 Preseason 1	FC Tucson	2–0	New Mexico United	Tucson, Arizona
11:00 AM MST	Trialist 70'; Adams 80'	Report		Stadium: Kino North Stadium

February 29, 2020 Preseason 2	FC Tucson	0–4	OKC Energy FC	Tucson, Arizona
11:00 AM MST		Report; Goals: 1 2 3 4	Chavez 11'; Saari 29'; Lopez 49'; Basuljevic 50'	Stadium: Kino North Stadium

=== USL League One ===
==== Standings ====
Pos	Team	Pld	W	L	D	GF	GA	GD	Pts	PPG
4	Richmond Kickers	16	8	6	2	22	22	0	26	1.63
5	Chattanooga Red Wolves SC	15	6	5	4	21	17	+4	22	1.47
6	FC Tucson	16	6	6	4	21	19	+2	22	1.38
7	Forward Madison FC	16	5	5	6	20	14	+6	21	1.31
8	Tormenta FC	16	5	7	4	19	22	−3	19	1.19

Source: 2020 USL League One standings
Rules for classification: 1) points; 2) total wins; 3) total goal differential; 4) total goals scored; 5) points earned against top four Conference finishers; 6) disciplinary points; 7) coin toss or drawing of lots

=== Results summary ===
Overall								Home						Away					
Pld	W	D	L	GF	GA	GD	Pts	W	D	L	GF	GA	GD	W	D	L	GF	GA	GD
16	6	4	6	21	19	+2	22	3	2	3	11	11	0	3	2	3	10	8	+2

Source: USL League One

Round	1	2	3	4	5	6	7	8	9	10	11	12	13	14	15	16
Stadium	A	A	H	A	A	A	H	H	H	A	H	H	A	A	H	H
Result	W	L	L	L	W	L	D	L	W	D	W	L	D	W	D	W
Position	3	6	8	10	4	8	8	9	7	7	5	6	6	5	5	5

Source: USL League One
A = Away; H = Home; W = Win; D = Draw; L = Loss

==== Match results ====
July 25, 2020 1	Fort Lauderdale CF	1–2	FC Tucson	Fort Lauderdale, Florida
8:00 PM EDT	Lopez-Espin 8'; Saavedra (yellow card) 25' (red card) 27'; Fray (yellow card) 38' (red card) 45+2'	Report; Report	Biek (yellow card) 37'; Liadi 87'; Valenzuela 90'	Stadium: Inter Miami CF Stadium; Attendance: 0 (Note: The remainder of the competition, is played behind closed doors due to the COVID-19 pandemic in North America.); Referee: Elvis Osmanovic

August 1, 2020 2	Chattanooga Red Wolves SC	1–0	FC Tucson	East Ridge, Tennessee
8:00 PM EDT	Soto (yellow card) 5'; Folla (yellow card) 15'; Doyle (yellow card) 38'; Zacarías (yellow card) 41'; Hurst 53'; Mangels (yellow card) 68'; Pineda (yellow card) 84'	Report; Report	Liadi (yellow card) 22'; Magaña-Rivera (yellow card) 42'; Somersall (yellow card) 59'; Biek (yellow card) 61'; Coan (penalty missed) 69'; Alarcón (yellow card) 89'	Stadium: CHI Memorial Stadium; Attendance: 721; Referee: Kyle Johnston

August 8, 2020 3	FC Tucson	1–2	Union Omaha	Tucson, Arizona
7:30 PM MDT	Alarcón (yellow card) 49'; Calvo (yellow card) 63'; Ramos-Godoy (yellow card) 76'; Virgen 90+3'	Report; Report	Conway (yellow card) 23'; Hauswirth 48', (yellow card) 78'; Vanacore-Decker 58'; Boyce (yellow card) 77'; Mare (yellow card) 90+5'	Stadium: Kino Sports Complex; Attendance: 0 Referee: Isaiah Vlad

August 15, 2020 4	Richmond Kickers	2–1	FC Tucson	Richmond, Virginia
7:00 PM EDT	Magalhães 8'; Kraft (yellow card) 24'; Bolduc (yellow card) 35'; Terzaghi 42'	Report; Report	Silva (yellow card) 41'; Logue (yellow card) 63'; Adams 81'; Dennis (yellow card) 90'	Stadium: City Stadium; Attendance: 634; Referee: Danielle Chesky

August 18, 2020 5	Orlando City B	1–4	FC Tucson	Kissimmee, Florida
4:00 PM MST	Rodas 18' (pen.), (yellow card) 90+1'; Kennedy (yellow card) 29'	Report; Report	Liadi 6', 26'; Alarcón 21'; Adams 41'; Valenzuela (yellow card) 46'	Stadium: Osceola County Stadium; Attendance: 0 Referee: Alyssa Nichols

August 29, 2020 6	Union Omaha	2–1	FC Tucson	Papillion, Nebraska
7:00 PM EDT	Boyce 16'; David (yellow card) 28'; Viader (yellow card) 55'; Sousa (yellow card) 73'; Molina 78'	Report	Adams 33'	Stadium: Werner Park; Attendance: 2,400; Referee: Calin Radosav

September 5, 2020 7	FC Tucson	2–2	Richmond Kickers	Tucson, Arizona
7:30 PM MDT	Alarcón 10' (pen.); Adams 15'	Report	Terzaghi 40' (pen.); Falck 90+3'	Stadium: Kino Sports Complex; Attendance: 0 Referee: Alan Martinez-Loyola

September 12, 2020 8	FC Tucson	0–2	North Texas SC	Tucson, Arizona
7:30 PM MDT	Alarcón (yellow card) 3'; Ramos-Godoy (yellow card) 59'; Liadi (yellow card) 70'; Lewis (yellow card) 83'; Ferriol (yellow card) 84'	Report	Damus 61' (pen.); Smith 69'	Stadium: Kino Sports Complex; Attendance: 0 Referee: Laura Rodriguez

September 16, 2020 9	FC Tucson	1–0	New England Revolution II	Tucson, Arizona
7:30 PM MDT	Elivelton 8'; Liadi (yellow card) 90+1'; Alarcón (yellow card) 90+4'	Report; Report	Maciel (yellow card) 29'	Stadium: Kino Sports Complex; Attendance: 0 Referee: Isaiah Vlad

September 19, 2020 10	North Texas SC	1–1	FC Tucson	Arlington, Texas
7:30 PM EDT	Cerrillo (red card) 21'; Hernandez 71'; Bruce (yellow card) 90+5'	Report; Report	Dennis (yellow card) 21'; Elivelton 45+5'	Stadium: Globe Life Park in Arlington; Attendance: 926; Referee: Gloria Resendiz

September 23, 2020 11	FC Tucson	2–1	Forward Madison FC	Tucson, Arizona
7:30 PM MDT	Elivelton 3'; Coan 55'; Liadi (yellow card) 74'	Report; Report	Paulo Jr. 40'; Leonard (yellow card) 68'; Trimmingham (yellow card) 90+3'	Stadium: Kino Sports Complex; Attendance: 0 Referee: Alan Martinez-Loyola

September 26, 2020 12	FC Tucson	1–2	Fort Lauderdale CF	Tucson, Arizona
7:30 PM MDT	Elivelton (yellow card) 49'; Ramos-Godoy 55' (pen.); Logue (yellow card) 82'	Report; Report	Nodarse (yellow card) 9'; Sosa (yellow card) 84', (goal) 90+4'; Kiesewetter 87'	Stadium: Kino Sports Complex; Attendance: 0 Referee: Samantha Martinez

October 3, 2020 13	Forward Madison FC	0–0	FC Tucson	Wauwatosa, Wisconsin
4:00 PM MDT	Wojcik (yellow card) 9'; Toyama (yellow card) 65'	Report; Report	Alarcón (yellow card) 26'; Liadi (yellow card) 35'; Virgen (yellow card) 45+3'; Dennis (yellow card) 66'; Biek (yellow card) 71'; Pena (yellow card) 87'	Stadium: Hart Park; Referee: Lukasz Szpala

October 7, 2020 14	Tormenta FC	0–1	FC Tucson	Statesboro, Georgia
4:00 PM MDT	Skelton (yellow card) 19'; Williams (yellow card) 68'; Rowe (yellow card) 90+4'	Report; Report	Ramos-Godoy 34'; Biek (yellow card) 67'; Logue (yellow card) 90+4'	Stadium: Eagle Field; Attendance: 400; Referee: Joshua Belk

October 10, 2020 15	FC Tucson	2–2	Greenville Triumph SC	Tucson, Arizona
7:30 PM MDT	Ramos-Godoy (yellow card) 12', (goal) 47'; Calvo (yellow card) 14'; Coan 45'; Virgen (yellow card) 56'; Merancio (yellow card) 71'	Report; Report	McLean 14', 90+1'; Polak (yellow card) 73'	Stadium: Kino Sports Complex; Referee: Alan Martinez-Loyola

October 17, 2020 16	FC Tucson	2–0	Orlando City B	Tucson, Arizona
7:30 PM MDT	Coan 45+3', 90'; Pena (yellow card) 83'	Report; Report	Williams (yellow card) 57'; Rosales (yellow card) 88'	Stadium: Kino Sports Complex; Referee: Kevin Sánchez

== Statistics ==
#	Pos.	Name	GP	GS	Min.	Goals	Assists	A yellow rectangle, denoting the yellow penalty card shown to a player being cautioned	A red rectangle, denoting the red penalty card shown to a player being sent off
77	FW	(United States) Shak Adams	12	9	809	4	2	0	0
11	MF	(United States) Josh Coan	11	6	561	4	0	0	0
6	DF	(Brazil) Elivelton	16	14	1104	3	2	1	0
9	FW	(United States) Azaad Liadi	15	11	979	3	3	5	0
19	FW	(United States) Giovanni Ramos-Godoy	15	11	952	3	0	2	0
7	MF	(Spain) Roberto Alarcón	16	15	1330	2	2	5	0
23	MF	(United States) Erik Virgen	12	10	907	1	0	3	0
26	DF	(United States) A. J. Valenzuela	3	1	100	1	0	1	0
20	DF	(Northern Ireland) Niall Logue	16	16	1440	0	0	4	0
10	FW	(England) Charlie Dennis	15	14	1176	0	5	3	0
5	MF	(Costa Rica) Esteban Calvo	13	12	1080	0	0	2	0
16	DF	(Germany) Samuel Biek	12	12	1062	0	0	4	0
1	GK	(Mexico) Carlos Merancio	9	9	810	0	1	1	0
33	DF	(United States) Tommy Silva	9	8	721	0	1	1	0
44	MF	(Saint Kitts and Nevis) Raheem Somersall	9	8	628	0	0	1	0
27	MF	(United States) Jordan Pena	5	5	450	0	0	2	0
95	MF	(Jamaica) Ramone Howell	14	2	294	0	0	0	0
21	DF	(United States) Charlie Booth	9	3	282	0	0	0	0
14	MF	(Spain) Manuel Ferriol	9	1	208	0	1	1	0
17	MF	(United States) Gio Magaña-Rivera	2	1	99	0	0	1	0
2	MF	(United States) Darryl Longdon	6	0	92	0	0	0	0
50	MF	(Trinidad and Tobago) Darius Lewis	5	0	52	0	0	1	0
4	DF	(United States) Jordan Hill	1	0	1	0	0	0	0

=== Goalkeepers ===
#	Name	GP	GS	Min.	SV	GA	GAA	SO	A yellow rectangle, denoting the yellow penalty card shown to a player being cautioned	A red rectangle, denoting the red penalty card shown to a player being sent off
99	(Jamaica) Amal Knight	7	7	630	26	6	0.857	2	0	0
1	(Mexico) Carlos Merancio	9	9	810	25	13	1.444	2	1	0
