= 2019 FC Tucson season =

FC Tucson
2019 season
- Owner: Phoenix Rising FC
- Manager: (United States) Darren Sawatzky
- Stadium: Kino North Stadium
- USL1 2019 season: 8th
- USL1 Playoffs: Did not qualify
- Top goalscorer: Devin Vega; Devyn Jambga (3)
- Highest home attendance: 1,772 (July 3 vs Toronto FC II)
- Lowest home attendance: 550 (Sept. 24 vs Greenville)
- Average home league attendance: 961
- Biggest win: 4–0 (May 18 v. Chattanooga Red Wolves SC)
- Biggest defeat: 0–5 (September 6 vs. Lansing)
Home colors	Away colors

The 2019 FC Tucson season was the club's eighth season of existence and their first full professional season in USL League One. They previously played in the Premier Development League (USL League Two as of 2019) and won four divisional titles.

== Competitions ==
=== Friendlies ===
March 10, 2019	Grand Canyon University	2–2	FC Tucson	Phoenix, Arizona
7:00pm	Aristotelous 6'; Yasuda 12'	Report	Delgado 9'; Jambga 68'; Hauswirth (yellow card) 70'	Stadium: GCU Stadium

March 18, 2019	FC Tucson	9–0	Sporting AZ FC	Tucson, Arizona
3:00pm		Report		Stadium: Kino North Stadium

=== Results summary ===
Overall								Home						Away					
Pld	W	D	L	GF	GA	GD	Pts	W	D	L	GF	GA	GD	W	D	L	GF	GA	GD
28	8	9	11	35	41	−6	33	5	5	4	20	19	+1	3	4	7	15	22	−7

Source: Match reports

Round	1	2	3	4	5	6	7	8	9	10	11	12	13	14	15	16	17	18	19	20	21	22	23	24	25	26	27	28
Stadium	A	A	H	H	H	A	H	A	H	H	A	A	A	H	A	A	A	A	A	A	H	H	H	A	H	H	H	H
Result	W	L	D	L	W	L	W	L	D	D	W	L	L	W	D	W	D	L	D	D	W	W	L	L	D	L	D	L
Position	1	4	6	8	5	9	4	6	4	5	4	5	8	6	7	5	5	7	7	7	7	7	7	7	7	8	8	8

Source: Match reports
A = Away; H = Home; W = Win; D = Draw; L = Loss

=== League results ===
March 30, 2019 1	Orlando City B	1–3	FC Tucson	Montverde, Florida
4:30pm	Diouf (yellow card) 35'; Hagan (yellow card) 38'; Mbuyu (yellow card) 40'; Mendoza (red card) 45'; Osei-Wusu 56'; Hill (yellow card) 62'; Granitur (yellow card) 90+5'	Report; Report	Bjornethun (yellow card) 14'; Delgado 22', 54'; Wright 45+4'	Stadium: Montverde Academy; Attendance: 305; Referee: Jasmine Peralta

April 3, 2019 2	Tormenta FC	3–1	FC Tucson	Statesboro, Georgia
5:00pm	Morrell (yellow card) 38' (goal) 58'; Eckenrode (yellow card) 54'; Coutinho 57'; Vinyals (yellow card) 60'; Micaletto 74' (yellow card) 74'	Report	Vega 55'; Somersall (yellow card) 60'	Stadium: Eagle Field; Attendance: 1,573; Referee: John Griggs

April 13, 2019 3	FC Tucson	1–1	Toronto FC II	Tucson, Arizona
7:30pm	Cox 73'	Report; Report	Dorsey (yellow card) 36'; Swartz (yellow card) 57'; Hamilton 79'	Stadium: Kino North Stadium; Attendance: 1,606; Referee: Reyna Fonseca

April 26, 2019 4	FC Tucson	0–2	Tormenta FC	Tucson, Arizona
7:30pm	Terrón (yellow card) 78'	Report	Gómez (yellow card) 52'; Coutinho 63'; Saint-Vil (yellow card) 65'; Arslan (yellow card) 89'; Micaletto (yellow card) 90+4'; Antley 90+5'	Stadium: Kino North Stadium; Attendance: 1,005; Referee: Laura Rodriguez

April 30, 2019 5	FC Tucson	2–0	Lansing Ignite FC	Tucson, Arizona
7:00pm	Jambga 27'; Somersall (yellow card) 38'; Spencer (yellow card) 49'; Vega (yellow card) 57' (goal) 62'	Report	Fricke (yellow card) 49'	Stadium: Kino North Stadium; Attendance: 702; Referee: Karen Abt

May 11, 2019 6	Richmond Kickers	2–0	FC Tucson	Richmond, Virginia
4:00pm	Keita (yellow card) 32'; Ackwei (yellow card) 68'; Gallardo 83'; Mwape (yellow card) 85' (goal) 90+6'	Report; Report	Hauswirth (yellow card) 55'; Sousa (yellow card) 82'	Stadium: City Stadium; Attendance: 1,089; Referee: Danielle Chesky

May 18, 2019 7	FC Tucson	4–0	Chattanooga Red Wolves SC	Tucson, Arizona
7:30pm	Jones 25' (pen.); Wakasa 35'; Jambga 66', 75'; Hanlin (yellow card) 77'; Stripling (yellow card) 86'	Report; Report	Caparelli (yellow card) 24'; Zguro (yellow card) 29'	Stadium: Kino North Stadium; Attendance: 1,125; Referee: Brad Jensen

May 24, 2019 8	Toronto FC II	1–0	FC Tucson	Toronto, Ontario
1:00pm	Mohammed (yellow card) 17'; Dorsey (yellow card) 31'; Perruzza 37'; Okello (yellow card) 86'; Campbell (yellow card) 88'	Report		Stadium: BMO Training Ground; Attendance: 309; Referee: Scott Bowman

May 31, 2019 9	FC Tucson	2–2	Orlando City B	Tucson, Arizona
7:30pm	Wheeler-Omiunu 58'; Terrón 73'; Cox (yellow card) 84'	Report; Report	Silva (yellow card) 35'; Rafael 58'; Sérginho (yellow card) 65'; Osei-Wusu (yellow card) 72', (goal) 78'; Simas (yellow card) 85'	Stadium: Kino North Stadium; Attendance: 1,354; Referee: Omeed Azadpour

June 8, 2019 10	FC Tucson	0–0	Richmond Kickers	Tucson, Arizona
7:30pm	Jones (yellow card) 33'	Report; Report	Rodriguez (yellow card) 24'; Eckenrode (yellow card) 90+1'	Stadium: Kino North Stadium; Attendance: 915; Referee: Samantha Martinez

June 12, 2019 11	Orlando City B	1–2	FC Tucson	Montverde, Florida
7:30pm	Amer (yellow card) 21'; Tablante (yellow card) 56'; De Souza 59' (pen.); Hernandez (yellow card) 81'	Report; Report	Cox 44'; Venter 45+1'; Stripling (yellow card) 66'; Delgado (yellow card) 90+1'	Stadium: Montverde Academy; Attendance: 183; Referee: Natalie Simon

June 15, 2019 12	Forward Madison FC	2–1	FC Tucson	Madison, Wisconsin
7:30pm	Paulo Jr. 1'; Eaton (yellow card) 23'; Banks 34'	Report; Report	Venter 90+5'	Stadium: Breese Stevens Field; Attendance: 4,020; Referee: Karen Abt

June 25, 2019 13	North Texas SC	1–0	FC Tucson	Frisco, Texas
7:00pm	Damus (yellow card) 32', (goal) 39'; Roberts (yellow card) 54'; Murillo (yellow card) 60'	Report; Report	Batista (yellow card) 66'; Venter (yellow card) 81'; Cox (yellow card) 84'	Stadium: Toyota Stadium; Attendance: 1,021; Referee: Laura Rodriguez

July 3, 2019 14	FC Tucson	3–1	Toronto FC II	Tucson, Arizona
7:00pm	Wheeler-Omiunu 5'; Vega 19'; Jones 26'	Report; Report	Srbely (yellow card) 41'; Mingo (yellow card) 65'; Bjornethun 77' (o.g.)	Stadium: Kino North Stadium; Attendance: 1,772; Referee: Karen Callado

July 13, 2019 15	Lansing Ignite FC	2–2	FC Tucson	Lansing, Michigan
7:30pm	Moshobane 26' (pen.), 49'; Williams (yellow card) 50'	Report	Howell 34'; Jones 52' (pen.); Hauswirth (yellow card) 73'	Stadium: Cooley Law School Stadium; Attendance: 4,348; Referee: Gabriele Giusti

July 20, 2019 16	Greenville Triumph SC	1–3	FC Tucson	Greenville, South Carolina
5:00pm	Gómez 15'	Report	Jambga 20', 58'; Venter 52'; Hauswirth (yellow card) 68'; Batista (yellow card) 68'	Stadium: Legacy Early College; Attendance: 2,395; Referee: Michael Smith

July 27, 2019 17	Chattanooga Red Wolves	1–1	FC Tucson	Chattanooga, Tennessee
7:00pm	Zguro (yellow card) 20'; Beattie (yellow card) 38'; Doyle (yellow card) 59'; Zayed 69'; Caparelli (yellow card) 85'	Report	Venter 1'; Wheeler-Omiunu (yellow card) 36'; Howell (yellow card) 45+5'; Hauswirth (yellow card) 75'	Stadium: David Stanton Field; Attendance: 1,325; Referee: Katja Koroleva

August 3, 2019 18	Forward Madison FC	1–0	FC Tucson	Madison, Wisconsin
7:30pm	Leonard (yellow card) 18'; Smart 44'; Núñez (yellow card) 76'; Banks (yellow card) 90+5'	Report	Spencer (yellow card) 60'	Stadium: Breese Stevens Field; Attendance: 4,350; Referee: Jonathan Bilinski

August 10, 2019 19	North Texas SC	1–1	FC Tucson	Frisco, Texas
7:20pm	Cerrillo (yellow card) 78'; Rodríguez 79'	Report	Jones 45'; Howell (yellow card) 58'	Stadium: Toyota Stadium; Attendance: 2,153; Referee: Brandon Starves

August 17, 2019 20	Tormenta FC	1–1	FC Tucson	Statesboro, Georgia
6:30pm	Dennis (yellow card) 71'; Micaletto 90+5' (pen.)	Report	Jambga (yellow card) 38'; Wakasa (yellow card) 42'; Jones 78' (pen.); Batista (yellow card) 90+4'; Venter (yellow card) 90+8'	Stadium: Eagle Field; Attendance: 1,990; Referee: Kevin Fikar

August 24, 2019 21	FC Tucson	3–1	Orlando City B	Tucson, Arizona
7:30pm	Delgado 36'; Jones 43'; Howell (yellow card) 53'; Virgen (yellow card) 61' (goal) 69'	Report	Ontivero (yellow card) 57'; Léo 76'	Stadium: Kino North Stadium; Attendance: 848; Referee: Karen Callado

August 30, 2019 22	FC Tucson	1–0	Chattanooga Red Wolves	Tucson, Arizona
7:30pm	Jones 16' (pen.); Hauswirth (yellow card) 38'; Wakasa (yellow card) 38'; Terrón (yellow card) 90+4'	Report	Mare (yellow card) 86'	Stadium: Kino North Stadium; Attendance: 910; Referee: Samantha Martinez

September 6, 2019 23	FC Tucson	0–5	Lansing Ignite FC	Tucson, Arizona
7:30pm	Wheeler-Omiunu (yellow card) 28'; Venter (yellow card) 62'; Batista (yellow card) 76'	Report	Moon (yellow card) 12'; Faz 16', 26'; Moshobane 33', 90+3'; Williams 60'	Stadium: Kino North Stadium; Attendance: 708; Referee: Omeed Azadpour

September 13, 2019 24	Greenville Triumph SC	4–0	FC Tucson	Greenville, South Carolina
7:30pm	Gómez 13', 21', 87'; Walker 26' (pen.); Donnelly (yellow card) 84'	Report	Hanlin (yellow card) 25'; Terrón (yellow card) 82'	Stadium: Legacy Early College; Attendance: 1,684; Referee: Joshua Encarnación

September 21, 2019 25	FC Tucson	0–0	Richmond Kickers	Tucson, Arizona
7:30pm	Venter (yellow card) 55' (yellow-red card) 74'; Howell (yellow card) 70'	Report	Gallardo (yellow card) 38'; Ackwei (yellow card) 81' (yellow-red card) 87'; Shanosky (red card) 84'	Stadium: Kino North Stadium; Attendance: 640; Referee: Reyna Fonseca

September 24, 2019 26	FC Tucson	2–3	Greenville Triumph SC	Tucson, Arizona
7:00pm	Spencer (yellow card) 40'; Jones 50' (pen.); Cox 89'	Report	Saul 3', 44'; Walker (yellow card) 57'; Bermudez 90+4', (yellow card) 90+5'	Stadium: Kino North Stadium; Attendance: 550; Referee: Alejandro Aguilera

September 27, 2019 27	FC Tucson	1–1	Forward Madison FC	Tucson, Arizona
7:30pm	Jones 31'; Batista (yellow card) 66'	Report	Smart 45+3' (pen.); Tobin (yellow card) 80'	Stadium: Kino North Stadium; Attendance: 638; Referee: Marco Vega

October 4, 2019 28	FC Tucson	1–3	North Texas SC	Tucson, Arizona
7:30pm	Terrón (yellow card) 15'; Hanlin (yellow card) 27'; Jones 42'; Cox (yellow card) 58'	Report	Jones 12' (o.g.); Romero 38', 65'; Avilez (yellow card) 43'; D. Rodriguez (yellow card) 89'	Stadium: Kino North Stadium; Attendance: 678; Referee: Dejan Susak

Pos	Team	Pld	W	D	L	GF	GA	GD	Pts
6	South Georgia Tormenta FC	28	9	10	9	32	34	−2	37
7	Toronto FC II	28	9	9	10	43	46	−3	36
8	FC Tucson	28	8	9	11	35	41	−6	33
9	Richmond Kickers	28	9	5	14	26	35	−9	32
10	Orlando City B	28	4	4	20	23	52	−29	16

Source: 2019 USL League One standings
Rules for classification: 1) total wins; 2) total goal differential; 3) total goals scored; 4) points earned against top four Conference finishers; 5) disciplinary points; 6) coin toss or drawing of lots

=== U.S. Open Cup ===
Due to their ownership by a more advanced level professional club, FC Tucson was one of 13 teams expressly forbidden from entering the Cup competition.

== Statistics ==
As of October 5, 2019

#	Pos.	Name	GP	GS	Min.	Goals	Assists	A yellow rectangle, denoting the yellow penalty card shown to a player being cautioned	A red rectangle, denoting the red penalty card shown to a player being sent off
99	FW	(United States) Jordan Jones	22	21	1,858	10	3	1	0
16	FW	(United States) Devyn Jambga	25	21	1,894	5	1	1	0
12	DF	(United States) Kyle Venter	23	23	2,054	4	1	3	1
11	MF	(United States) Jamael Cox	23	18	1,596	3	3	3	0
9	FW	(Spain) Guillermo Delgado	24	12	1,179	3	2	1	0
15	FW	(United States) Devin Vega	9	7	660	3	0	1	0
28	MF	(United States) Andrew Wheeler-Omiunu	20	20	1,736	2	0	2	0
3	DF	(Spain) José Terrón	19	17	1,475	1	2	4	0
33	DF	(United States) Kody Wakasa	17	14	1,298	1	0	2	0
50	MF	(United States) Erik Virgen	16	15	1,275	1	1	1	0
19	FW	(United States) Zach Wright	22	10	959	1	1	0	0
13	DF	(United States) Luke Hauswirth	24	21	1,849	0	0	5	0
22	DF	(United States) Lamar Batista	18	18	1,620	0	0	5	0
18	GK	(Mexico) Carlos Merancio	13	13	1,170	0	1	0	0
95	MF	(Jamaica) Ramone Howell	12	10	906	0	1	2	0
23	DF	(United States) Kyle Bjornethun	8	8	720	0	0	1	0
6	MF	(Saint Kitts and Nevis) Raheem Somersall	11	8	713	0	1	2	0
17	MF	(United States) Karsten Hanlin	9	8	675	0	0	3	0
2	DF	(United States) Austin Ledbetter	8	7	643	0	0	0	0
14	MF	(United States) Colin Stripling	10	5	520	0	0	2	0
8	FW	(Guinea-Bissau) Eti Tavares	13	4	374	0	0	0	0
20	DF	(United States) Scott DeVoss	5	3	314	0	0	0	0
25	FW	(United States) Ben Spencer	3	3	245	0	0	3	0
7	FW	(Israel) Roy Abergil	7	1	196	0	1	0	0
10	MF	(Mexico) Luis Martínez	2	2	141	0	1	0	0
25	FW	(United States) Ilijah Paul	3	2	126	0	0	0	0
21	FW	(United States) Joey Calistri	1	1	72	0	0	0	0
4	DF	(Republic of Ireland) Corey Whelan	1	1	63	0	0	0	0
27	DF	(Cape Verde) Klisman Sousa	2	0	23	0	0	1	0

=== Goalkeepers ===
#	Name	GP	GS	Min.	SV	GA	GAA	SO	A yellow rectangle, denoting the yellow penalty card shown to a player being cautioned	A red rectangle, denoting the red penalty card shown to a player being sent off
24	(United States) Phillip Ejimadu	15	15	1,350	37	21	1.400	4	0	0
18	(Mexico) Carlos Merancio	13	13	1,170	41	20	1.538	1	0	0

== Transfers ==
=== Loan in ===
Start date	End date	Position	No.	Player	From club
April 2, 2019	Until recalled	Forward	15	(United States) Devin Vega	(United States) Phoenix Rising FC
April 11, 2019	Until recalled	Forward	25	(United States) Ilijah Paul	(United States) Phoenix Rising FC
April 11, 2019	Until recalled	Defender	20	(United States) Scott DeVoss	(United States) Hartford Athletic
April 11, 2019	Until recalled	Defender	27	(Cape Verde) Klisman Sousa	(United States) Hartford Athletic
April 30, 2019	Until recalled	Forward	21	(United States) Joey Calistri	(United States) Phoenix Rising FC
April 30, 2019	Until recalled	Forward	25	(United States) Ben Spencer	(United States) Phoenix Rising FC

== See also ==
- 2019 in American soccer
- 2019 USL League One season
- FC Tucson
