= List of association football club rivalries in the Americas =

This list deals with association football rivalries around the Americas among clubs. This includes local derbies as well as matches between teams further afield. For rivalries between international teams and club rivalries around the world, see List of association football rivalries.

Only clubs of federations which are members of CONCACAF or CONMEBOL are included.

== Clubs in North, Central America and the Caribbean (CONCACAF) ==
=== Aruba ===
- Clasico di Aruba: Dakota vs. RCA

=== Bermuda ===
- Devonshire derby: Devonshire Colts vs. Devonshire Cougars

=== Canada ===
- Canadian Classique: Toronto FC vs. CF Montréal
- Trillium Cup: Toronto FC vs. Columbus Crew
- Cascadia Cup: Portland Timbers vs. Seattle Sounders FC vs. Vancouver Whitecaps FC
- Cavalry–Forge: Cavalry FC vs. Forge FC
- Al Classico: Cavalry FC vs. FC Edmonton (no longer contested with FC Edmonton now defunct)
- 905 Derby: Forge FC vs. York United FC
- Canadian NASL rivalry: FC Edmonton vs. Ottawa Fury (no longer contested with both clubs now defunct)
- Toronto Derby: Toronto Croatia vs. Serbian White Eagles

=== Costa Rica ===
- Clásico Nacional: Alajuelense vs. Deportivo Saprissa
- Clásico Provincial:
  - Alajuelense vs. Herediano
  - Herediano vs. Cartaginés
- Clásico del Buen Fútbol: Deportivo Saprissa vs. Herediano
- Clásico de las Metrópolis: Deportivo Saprissa vs. Cartaginés
- Clásico del Caribe: Limón vs. Santos Guapiles
- Clásico de Occidente: Municipal Grecia vs. Ramonense
- Clásico de los Puertos: Limón vs. Puntarenas
- Derbi de la Ciudad de Alajuela: Alajuelense vs. Carmelita
- Clásico del Pacífico: Guanacasteca vs Puntarenas
- Clásico del la Pampa: Guanacasteca vs Liberia
- Clásico Puntarenense: Puntarenas vs Jicaral

=== Curaçao ===
- E Classico di Banda Bou: CSD Barber vs. UNDEBA

=== Dominican Republic ===
- El Clásico del Fútbol Dominicano: Moca FC vs. Atlético San Cristóbal

=== El Salvador ===
- Clásico Nacional: Club Deportivo FAS vs. Águila
- Clásico de Occidente: Isidro Metapán vs. FAS
- Clásico Capitalino: Atlético Marte vs. Alianza
- Clásico Migueleño: Dragón vs. Águila
- Clásico Oriental: Luis Ángel Firpo vs. Águila
- Clásico de la Liga salvadoreña: Luis Ángel Firpo vs. FAS
- Clásico Joven: Alianza vs. Luis Ángel Firpo

=== Guatemala ===
- El Clásico Chapín: Comunicaciones vs. Municipal
- Clásico Occidente: Xelajú vs. Marquense
- Clásico Oriental: Sacachispas vs. Zacapa
- Clásico Quetzalteco: Xelajú MC vs. Deportivo Coatepeque
- Clásico del Suroccidente: Xelajú MC vs. Suchitepéquez

=== Haiti ===
- Derby National : Racing vs. Violette also known as the Port-au-Prince Derby
- Derby de Saint-Marc: Baltimore SC vs. Tempête

=== Honduras ===
- Clásico Moderno: Real C.D. España vs. C.D. Olimpia
- Motagua–Real España football rivalry: Real C.D. España vs. C.D. Motagua
- Clásico Nacional Hondureño: C.D. Marathón vs. C.D. Olimpia
- Clásico Sampedrano: Real C.D. España vs. C.D. Marathón
- Honduran Superclásico: C.D. Motagua vs. C.D. Olimpia

=== Jamaica ===
- Waterhouse-Harbour View derby: Harbour View vs. Waterhouse
- Western Kingston derby: Boys' Town vs. Tivoli Gardens
- Trench Town derby: Arnett Gardens vs. Boys' Town
- Clarendon derby: Humble Lions vs. Sporting Central Academy

=== Mexico ===
- El Super Clasico: América vs. Guadalajara
- Clásico Joven: América vs. Cruz Azul
- Clasico Tapatio: Guadalajara vs. Atlas
- Clásico Regiomontano: Tigres UANL vs. Monterrey
- Clásico Capitalino: América vs. U.N.A.M
- Clásico Universitario: Tigres UANL vs. U.N.A.M.
- Clásico Hidalguense: Cruz Azul vs. Pachuca
- Rivalry between Cruz Azul vs. U.N.A.M.
- Clásico de la 57: Querétaro vs. Atlético de San Luis
- Rivalry between Club León vs. Pachuca
- Clásico Fronterizo: Club Tijuana vs. FC Juárez
- Clasico Tamaulipeco: Correcaminos UAT vs. C.D.S. Tampico Madero
- Rivalry between Atlante vs. Cancún
- Rivalry between Leones Negros vs Tapatío
- Clásico Añejo: Necaxa vs. Atlante
- Clásico de Sinaloa: Dorados de Sinaloa vs. Mazatlán F.C.
- Rivalry between Atlético Morelia vs. Mazatlán F.C.
- Clásico Mexiquense: Toluca vs. Toros Neza
- Clásico del Bajio: (every game between Irapuato, Club Celaya or Club León)
- Clásico Lagunero: Santos Laguna vs. Alacranes de Durango
- El Clásico Del Sur: Puebla vs. Veracruz (defunct)
- Clasico Poblano: Puebla vs. Lobos BUAP (defunct)
- Antiguo Clásico Universitario: U.N.A.M. vs. FC Politécnico
- TV wars: América vs. Monarcas Morelia (defunct)

=== Nicaragua ===
- Clásico Nacional: Real Estelí vs Diriangén
- Clásico de las Segovias: Real Madriz vs. Deportivo Ocotal

=== Panama ===
- El Clásico: Tauro F.C. vs. Plaza Amador
- Clásico Interiorano: Atlético Chiriquí vs. Atlético Veragüense

=== Puerto Rico ===
- Clásico Boricua: Puerto Rico Islanders vs. River Plate Puerto Rico (Defunct)

=== Suriname ===
- Cottica Derby: Wanhattie vs. Young Rhythm
- Defensie Derby: PVV (Police) vs. SNL (Military)
- De Surinaamse Klassieker: Robinhood vs. Transvaal
- Marowijne Derby: Papatam vs. Caravan
- Meerzorgse Derby: Excelsior vs. Nishan 42
- Moengolese Derby: Notch vs. Inter Moengotapoe
- Paramaribo Derby's: Leo Victor vs. Robinhood vs. Transvaal vs. Voorwaarts vs. WBC
- Saramacca Derby's: Boskamp vs. Fortuna vs. Real Saramacca

=== Trinidad and Tobago ===
- El Classico Trinbago: San Juan Jabloteh vs. W Connection

=== United States ===
- California Clásico or California Derby: LA Galaxy vs. San Jose Earthquakes
- El Tráfico or Los Angeles Derby: Los Angeles FC vs. LA Galaxy
- Cascadia Cup: Portland Timbers vs. Seattle Sounders FC vs. Vancouver Whitecaps FC
  - Portland Timbers–Seattle Sounders rivalry
  - Seattle Sounders–Vancouver Whitecaps rivalry
- La Chanclásico: Angel City FC vs. San Diego Wave FC
- Coastal Cup: Fort Lauderdale Strikers vs. Jacksonville Armada vs. Miami FC vs. Tampa Bay Rowdies
  - Florida Derby: Fort Lauderdale Strikers vs. Tampa Bay Rowdies
  - Turnpike Derby: Orlando City SC vs. Inter Miami CF
- Dylan Wolpers Derby: Houston Dynamo vs. Minnesota United FC
- I-95 soccer rivalries
  - Atlantic Cup: D.C. United vs. New York Red Bulls
  - Hudson River Derby: New York City FC vs. New York Red Bulls
  - East River Derby: New York City FC vs. New York Cosmos
  - New York Derby: New York Cosmos vs. New York Red Bulls
  - Battery-Kickers: Charleston Battery vs. Richmond Kickers
  - Kickers–United: D.C. United vs. Richmond Kickers
  - Revolution–Red Bulls derby: New England Revolution vs. New York Red Bulls
  - Revolution–United: D.C. United vs. New England Revolution
  - Shertz–Gemmel Cup/Colonial Cup: D.C. United vs. Philadelphia Union
  - Coffee Pot Cup: D.C. United vs. Charleston Battery
- I-70 Soccer Derbies
  - Sporting Kansas City vs. Colorado Rapids
  - Sporting Kansas City vs. Saint Louis FC
  - Sporting Kansas City vs Columbus Crew
  - Sporting Kansas City vs. St. Louis City SC
- Deep South Derbies
  - I-85 Derby: Atlanta United vs. Charlotte FC
  - Orlando City SC vs. Atlanta United
  - Atlanta United vs. Nashville SC
  - Nashville SC vs. Charlotte FC
- Maple Syrup Derby: New England Revolution vs. CF Montreal
- Texas Derby: Houston Dynamo vs. FC Dallas
- Hell Is Real Derby or Ohio Derby: FC Cincinnati vs. Columbus Crew
- Heritage Cup: San Jose Earthquakes vs. Seattle Sounders FC
- Rocky Mountain Cup: Real Salt Lake vs. Colorado Rapids
- Brimstone Cup: Chicago Fire FC vs. FC Dallas
- Trillium Cup: Toronto FC vs. Columbus Crew
- SuperClasico: Chivas USA vs. LA Galaxy (defunct)

==== USL Rivalries ====
- 405 Derby: LA Galaxy II vs. Orange County SC
- Dirty River Derby: FC Cincinnati vs. Louisville City FC (defunct)
- Queen City Cup Challenge: FC Cincinnati vs. Charlotte Independence (defunct)
- Route 6 Derby/"El Clamico": Hartford Athletic vs. Rhode Island FC
- Southern Derby: Charleston Battery vs. North Carolina FC
- Southern Harm Derby: Birmingham Legion FC vs. Memphis 901 (defunct)
- Southwestern Showdown: Albuquerque Sol FC vs. FC Tucson
- James River Cup: Hampton Roads Piranhas vs. Richmond Kickers vs. Virginia Beach Mariners
- Silver State Cup: Las Vegas Lights FC vs. Reno 1868 FC (defunct)
- Louisville – Indianapolis Proximity Association Football Contest (LIPAFC): Indy Eleven vs. Louisville City FC

==== College rivalries ====
- Michigan–Michigan State men's soccer rivalry: Michigan Wolverines vs. Michigan State Spartans
- BYU–Utah rivalry: BYU Cougars vs. Utah Utes
- Milwaukee Cup: Marquette Golden Eagles vs. Milwaukee Panthers
- LeWang Cup: Northern Illinois Huskies vs. Milwaukee Panthers
- Big 12/SEC Challenge: UCF Knights vs. West Virginia Mountaineers vs. Kentucky Wildcats vs. South Carolina Gamecocks (Men only, in the Sun Belt Conference, referencing the two conferences that don't sponsor the sport where the four schools are full-time members, with the Big 12 Conference the home of UCF and West Virginia, and the Southeastern Conference the home of Kentucky and South Carolina.)
  - SEC Derby: Kentucky Wildcats vs. South Carolina Gamecocks (Men only)
  - Big 12 Derby: UCF Knights vs West Virginia Mountaineers (Men only)
- Maryland–Virginia men's soccer rivalry
- Blue–Green Rivalry: Cal Poly Mustangs vs. UC Santa Barbara Gauchos
- Army–Navy Cup
- Indiana–Notre Dame men's soccer rivalry
- Saint Louis–SIU Edwardsville men's soccer rivalry
- Modern Day Hate: Georgia Southern Eagles vs, Georgia State Panthers
- Battle of Brooklyn: LIU Sharks vs. St. Francis Brooklyn Terriers (defunct)
  - While both schools sponsored soccer for both men and women before St. Francis Brooklyn shut down its athletic program in 2023, the "Battle of Brooklyn" name was officially used only in men's soccer. (The name was also applied to the men's and women's basketball rivalries, but not to any other sports.)

==== Lower league rivalries ====
- Rust Belt Derby: Detroit City FC vs. FC Buffalo vs. AFC Cleveland.
- Chicago Dębica derby: Igloopol Chicago vs. Wisłoka Chicago
- New York Hellenic derby: Greek American AA vs. New York Pancyprian-Freedoms
- The Wooden Shoe: Kingston Stockade FC vs. Hartford City FC
- 803 Derby: Soda City FC vs. South Carolina United Heat (UPSL)

== Clubs in South America (CONMEBOL) ==
=== Bolivia ===
- Clásico Paceño: Club Bolívar vs. The Strongest
- Clásico Cruceño: Club Blooming vs. Oriente Petrolero
- Clásico del sur: Universitario de Sucre vs. Real Potosí
- Clásico de la Villa Imperial: Real Potosí vs. Nacional Potosí
- Clásico cochabambino: C.D. Jorge Wilstermann vs. Club Aurora

=== Colombia ===
- Rivalry amongst Atlético Nacional and Millonarios
- Rivalry amongst América de Cali and Atlético Nacional
- Rivalry amongst América de Cali and Millonarios
- Clásico añejo: Deportivo Cali vs. Millonarios
- Clásico Vallecaucano: América de Cali vs. Deportivo Cali, alternatively called "Clasico de San Fernando" or "Cali Derby".
- Clásico Capitalino: Millonarios vs. Santa Fe
- Clásico Paisa: Atlético Nacional vs. Independiente Medellín, or "Clásico Antioqueño"
- Clásico Costeño: Junior vs. Unión Magdalena vs. Real Cartagena
- Clásico Cafetero: Once Caldas vs. Deportivo Pereira vs. Deportes Quindío
- Clásico Santandereano: Cúcuta Deportivo vs. Atlético Bucaramanga, alternatively called "Clasico del Oriente colombiano”
- Clásico del Tolima Grande: Deportes Tolima vs. Atlético Huila

=== Ecuador ===
- Clásico del Astillero: Barcelona vs. Emelec
- Clásico Capitalino: LDU Quito vs. Deportivo Quito
- Superclásico de Quito: Aucas vs. LDU Quito
- Clásico del Austro: Deportivo Cuenca vs.Liga de Loja
- Clásico Cuencano: Deportivo Cuenca vs. L.D.U. Cuenca
- Superclásico Esmeraldeño: C.S.D. Juventus vs. Esmeraldas Petrolero
- Clásico Manabita: LDU Portoviejo vs. Delfín SC
- Clásico del Pueblo: Aucas vs. Deportivo Quito
- Clásico Ambateño: Macará vs. Técnico Universitario
- Clásico Universitario: Liga de Quito vs. Universidad Católica

=== Paraguay ===
- Superclásico: Olimpia vs. Cerro Porteño
- Clásico más añejo: Olimpia vs. Guaraní
- Black and White derby: Olimpia vs. Libertad
- Clásico del Asunción: Cerro Porteño vs. Libertad
- Clásico del barrio Trinidad: Club Rubio Ñu vs. Sportivo Trinidense
- Clásico Metropolitano: Sportivo Luqueño vs. Sportivo San Lorenzo
- Clásico de Barrio Obrero: Cerro Porteño vs. Nacional Asunción
- Clásico de Campo Grande: Cerro Corá vs. Independiente de Campo Grande (defunct)
- Clásico de barrio Jara: Sportivo Ameliano vs. Club Tacuary
- Clásico de Zeballos Cué: Tacuary vs. General Caballero
- Clásico del barrio Ricardo Brugada o del "Bajo": Oriental vs. Resistencia
- Clásico del Este: 3 de Febrero vs. Cerro de Franco.
- Clásico Capiateño: Martín Ledesma vs. 2 de Febrero.
- Clásico de Itá: Olimpia Itá vs Sportivo Iteño.
- Clásico de Itauguá: 12 de Octubre Itauguá vs. Olimpia de Itauguá
- Clásico de vecinos: Martín Ledesma vs. 12 de Octubre Itauguá
- Clásico de Luque: General Díaz vs. 29 de Setiembre
- Clásico de Ñemby: Cristobal Colón vs. Fulgencio Yegros.

=== Peru ===
- Superclásico: Alianza Lima vs. Universitario
- Clásico Universitario - Cristal: Sporting Cristal vs. Universitario
- Clásico Alianza - Cristal: Sporting Cristal vs. Alianza Lima
- Modern Classic: Deportivo Municipal vs. Universitario
- Clásicos Callao - Lima: Sport Boys vs. Alianza Lima, Deportivo Municipal, Sporting Cristal, Universitario
- Clásico Chalaco or Clásico Porteño: Sport Boys vs. Atlético Chalaco
- Clásico del Norte: Juan Aurich vs. CDU César Vallejo vs. Carlos A. Mannucci vs. Atlético Torino vs. Atlético Grau
- Clásico del Sur: FBC Melgar vs. Cienciano
- Clásico Arequipeño: FBC Melgar vs. FBC Aurora can also include FBC Piérola, Sportivo Huracán and FBC White Star
- Clásico Cuzqueño: Cienciano vs. Deportivo Garcilaso can also include either against Cusco FC
- Clásico Huanuqueño: Alianza Universidad vs. León de Huánuco
- Clásico Puneño: Alfonso Ugarte vs. Unión Carolina can also include either against Deportivo Binacional
- Clásico Yanacanchino: Columna Pasco vs. Alipio Ponce

=== Uruguay ===
- Clásico del fútbol uruguayo: Nacional v Peñarol
- Clásico de los Medianos: Danubio v Defensor Sporting
- Clásico del Prado: River Plate v Wanderers v Bella Vista
- Clásico de la Villa: Cerro v Rampla Juniors
- Clásico del Cerrito: Club Sportivo Cerrito v Rentistas
- Clásico del Norte: Tacuarembó F.C. v Cerro Largo F.C.
- Clásico del Oeste: Fénix v Racing Club
- Clásico entre Cerro y los grandes: Cerro v Nacional or Peñarol

=== Venezuela ===
- Clasico Moderno: Caracas FC vs. Deportivo Táchira
- Clasico Viejo: C.S. Marítimo de Venezuela vs. Deportivo Táchira
- Clásico de Los Andes: Estudiantes de Mérida vs. Deportivo Táchira
- Clásico de la Autopista / del centro: Carabobo F.C. vs. Aragua F.C.
- Clásico añejo del fútbol venezolano: Estudiantes de Mérida vs. Portuguesa F.C.
- Clásico caraqueño / capitolano: Caracas F.C. vs. Petare F.C.
- Clásico del sur venezolano: Mineros de Guayana vs. Minervén S.C.
- Clásico occidental: Deportivo Lara vs. Yaracuyanos F.C.
- Clásico oriental: Mineros de Guayana vs. Monagas S.C.
- Clásico portugueseño: Llaneros de Guanare vs. Portuguesa F.C.
- Clásico rojinegro: Deportivo Lara vs. Portuguesa F.C.
- Derbi Zuliano: Zulia FC vs. Deportivo JBL del Zulia
