= Ramone Howell =

Jamaican footballer (born 1995)

Personal information
- Date of birth: 15 April 1995 (age 31)
- Place of birth: Portmore, Jamaica
- Height: 1.83 m (6 ft 0 in)
- Position: Midfielder

Team information
- Current team: Waterhouse
- Number: 26

Youth career
- –2010: Cumberland
- 2010–2011: Waterhouse

College career
Years	Team	Apps	(Gls)
2014–2017	Valparaiso Crusaders	67	(7)

Senior career*
Years	Team	Apps	(Gls)
2011–2012	Wanderers	2+	(0)
2012–2013	Waterhouse	0	(0)
2013	Royal Lakes		(0)
2013–2014	Waterhouse	18	(0)
2015–2017	Des Moines Menace	18	(3)
2018–2019	Nashville SC	2	(0)
2018	→ Inter Nashville (loan)	7	(3)
2019	Phoenix Rising	0	(0)
2019	→ FC Tucson (loan)	12	(1)
2020	FC Tucson	14	(0)
2021–2023	Waterhouse	57	(5)
2023–2024	Mount Pleasant FA	17	(1)
2024–	Portmore United	62	(2)

International career^{‡}
- Jamaica U17
2015	Jamaica U23		
2022–	Jamaica	7	(0)
- * Club domestic league appearances and goals as of 8 October 2026 ‡ National team caps and goals as of 5 October 2026

Ramone Howell (born 15 April 1995) is a Jamaican professional footballer who plays as a midfielder for Jamaican club Portmore United and the Jamaica national team.

== Early career ==
Born in Portmore, Jamaica, Howell played schoolboy football at Bridgeport High School and Jamaica College. He appeared for Cumberland in the Portmore U-15 Football League before moving to the youth sides at Waterhouse. Howell joined Wanderers in July 2011 and made his senior debut in the St. Catherine Major League, receiving two yellow cards. He returned to Waterhouse to begin the 2012–13 season, but after only featuring for the under-20 team, he left at the end of January to join Royal Lakes. Howell again returned to Waterhouse and made his National Premier League debut with the club during the 2013–14 season.

== College and amateur ==
Howell played soccer at Valparaiso University from 2014 to 2017, scoring seven goals in 67 appearances. He also played for PDL side Des Moines Menace in 2016. Howell scored in Des Moines' 2–0 defeat of the Michigan Bucks in the first round of the 2017 PDL playoffs.

== Club career ==
On 23 January 2018, Nashville SC announced the signing of Howell ahead of their inaugural USL campaign. On 13 June 2019, Nashville traded Howell to fellow USL side Phoenix Rising FC. On 25 June, Howell made his first appearance on loan with FC Tucson, the Rising's reserve team in USL League One, in a 1–0 loss to North Texas SC.

In 2021, Howell returned to his former club and re-joined Waterhouse. . Howell moved to Mount Pleasant Football Academy for the 2023-2024 JPL, before making another move to his hometown club, Portmore United F.C. in July 2024.

== Personal life ==
Howell's older brother, Kenroy Howell, is also a professional footballer.

== Honors ==
- Portmore United

JPL Champion: 2025-2026

== Career statistics ==
=== Club ===
As of 8 October 2026

Appearances and goals by club, season and competition
Club	Season	League			Cup (Note: All confirmed appearances in the U.S. Open Cup)		Continental		Other		Total	
Club	Season	Division	Apps	Goals	Apps	Goals	Apps	Goals	Apps	Goals	Apps	Goals
Wanderers	2011–12	St. Catherine Major League	2	0	—		—		—		2	0
Waterhouse	2012–13	National Premier League	0	0	0	0	0	0	—		0	0
Royal Lakes	2012–13	South Central Confederation Super League		0	—		—		—			0
Waterhouse	2013–14	National Premier League	18	0			3 (Note: Appearances in the Caribbean Club Championship)	0	—		21+	0+
Des Moines Menace	2015	PDL	2	1	1	1	—		0	0	3	2
Des Moines Menace	2016	PDL	7	0	3	0	—		1 (Note: Appearance(s) in the PDL playoffs)	0	11	0
Des Moines Menace	2017	PDL	9	2	0	0	—		2	1	11	3
Des Moines Menace	Total		18	3	4	1	0	0	3	1	25	5
Nashville SC	2018	USL	1	0	1	0	—		1 (Note: Appearance in the USL Cup playoffs)	0	3	0
Nashville SC	2019	USL Championship	1	0	1	0	—		0	0	2	0
Nashville SC	Total		2	0	2	0	0	0	1	0	5	0
Inter Nashville (loan)	2018	NPSL	7	3	0	0	—		1 (Note: Appearance in the NPSL playoffs)	0	8	3
Phoenix Rising	2019	USL Championship	0	0	0	0	—		0	0	0	0
FC Tucson (loan)	2019	USL League One	12	1	—		—		—		12	1
FC Tucson	2020	USL League One	14	0	—		—		—		14	0
FC Tucson	Total		26	1	0	0	0	0	0	0	26	1
Waterhouse	2021	Jamaica Premier League	13	1	—		—		—		13	1
Waterhouse	2022	Jamaica Premier League	20	1	—		5 (Note: Three appearances in the Caribbean Club Championship, two in the CONCACAF League)	0	—		25	1
Waterhouse	2022–23	Jamaica Premier League	24	3	—		2 (Note: Appearances in CONCACAF League)	0	—		26	3
Waterhouse	Total		57	5	0	0	7	0	0	0	64	5
Mount Pleasant FA	2023–24	Jamaica Premier League	17	1	3	0	—		—		20	1
Portmore United	2024–25	Jamaica Premier League	24	0	—		—		—		24	0
Portmore United	2025–26	Jamaica Premier League	36	2	—		—		—		36	2
Portmore United	2026–27	Jamaica Premier League	2	0	—		4 (Note: Appearances in CONCACAF Caribbean Cup)	0	—		6	0
Portmore United	Total		62	2	—		4	0	—		66	2
Career total			209	15	9	1	14	0	5	1	237	17

=== International ===
As of 5 October 2026

Appearances and goals by national team and year
National team	Year	Apps	Goals
Jamaica	2022	3	0
Jamaica	2026	1	0
Total		4	0
