= Darius Lewis =

Trinidad and Tobago footballer

Personal information
- Full name: Darius Khambrel Lewis
- Date of birth: 11 October 1999 (age 27)
- Place of birth: Port St. Lucie, Florida, U.S.
- Height: 1.70 m (5 ft 7 in)
- Positions: Winger; forward

Team information
- Current team: Audax Rio

Youth career
- 2014: Boca Raton FC
- 2014–2015: FC Florida
- 2015–2018: Philadelphia Union

Senior career*
Years	Team	Apps	(Gls)
2019	KÍ	12	(3)
2020	FC Tucson	5	(0)
2022–	Botafogo	1	(0)
2024–	→ Audax Rio (loan)	0	(0)

International career^{‡}
2019	Trinidad and Tobago	1	(2)
- * Club domestic league appearances and goals as of 20:43, 19 January 2023 (UTC) ‡ National team caps and goals as of 15 April 2022

Darius Khambrel Lewis (born 11 October 1999) is a professional footballer who plays as a winger for Audax Rio, on loan from Botafogo. Born in the United States, he has played for the Trinidad and Tobago national team.

== Club career ==
=== Youth ===
Lewis spent time with teams in the Olympic Development Program in South Florida, and later six-month spells with USSDA side Boca Raton FC and FC Florida. In 2015, he made the move to Philadelphia Union's academy, where he played for three years.

=== Professional ===
==== Klaksvíkar Ítróttarfelag ====
Lewis opted to forgo playing college soccer and instead pursued a professional career. On January 8, 2019, he signed with Betri deildin menn side KÍ of the Faroe Islands. He helped the side win the league during his time there, scoring 3 goals in 12 league appearances.

==== FC Tucson ====
In September 2020, Lewis returned to the United States, joining USL League One side FC Tucson. He made his debut for the club on September 5, 2020, appearing as a 90th-minute substitute during a 2–2 draw with Richmond Kickers. His contract option was not picked up by Tucson following the 2020 season.

== International career ==
Whilst born and raised in the United States, Lewis expressed a desire to represent Trinidad and Tobago, the country of birth of both of his parents.

He made his debut for the Trinidad & Tobago senior team on November 10, 2019, scoring two goals in a 15–0 victory over Anguilla, who were ranked bottom of the FIFA rankings.

=== International goals ===
Scores and results list Trinidad and Tobago's goal tally first.

No	Date	Venue	Opponent	Score	Result	Competition
1.	10 November 2019	Ato Boldon Stadium, Couva, Trinidad and Tobago	Anguilla	13–0	15–0	Friendly
2.	10 November 2019	Ato Boldon Stadium, Couva, Trinidad and Tobago	Anguilla	14–0	15–0	Friendly

== Career statistics ==
As of October 25, 2020

Club	Season	League			Cup		Continental		Other		Total	
Club	Season	Division	Apps	Goals	Apps	Goals	Apps	Goals	Apps	Goals	Apps	Goals
KÍ	2019	Betri deildin menn	12	3	3	1	1	0	–	–	16	4
FC Tucson	2020	USL1	5	0	–	–	–	–	–	–	5	0
Career Totals			17	3	3	1	1	0	0	0	21	4

== Honors ==
=== Club ===
KÍ

- Faroe Islands Premier League: 2019
