= Longdon =

Longdon may refer to:

- Longdon, Staffordshire in Lichfield district
- Longdon, Worcestershire in Malvern Hills district
- Longdon-on-Tern, Shropshire
- Mount Longdon, East Falkland Island
- Longdon (surname)

== See also ==
- London (disambiguation)
