= José Terrón =

José Terrón may refer to:

- José Terrón (actor) (1939–2019), Spanish player of bit parts in films
- José Terrón (footballer) (born 1991), Spanish defender
