= 2016 BYU Cougars men's soccer team =

BYU Cougars men's soccer
2016 season
- Owner: Brigham Young University
- Coach: Brandon Gilliam
- Stadium: South Stadium, 3,000 capacity
Home colors	Away colors

The 2016 BYU Cougars men's soccer team was a part of the BYU Athletics program, but they did not compete in a college conference. Instead, they participated in the 2016 USL Premier Development League (PDL). The team was led by first-year head coach Brandon Gilliam. Along with the arrival of a new coach, BYU made a divisional move from the Mountain Division of the PDL to the Central Pacific division. This change occurred due to the folding of the Mountain Division following the closure of the Real Colorado Foxes franchise.

== Media ==
=== Television & Internet Streaming ===
All BYU Cougars home games are streamed live on YouTube.

== Regular season ==
=== Orange County Blues U–23 ===
May 12 1	BYU Cougars	0–1	Orange County Blues U-23	Irvine, CA
8:00 p.m. MDT	Payden Pemberton (yellow card) 62'; Cameron McLaughlin (yellow card) 86'		Gerzon Blanco 45'; Angel Maldonado (yellow card) 65'; Justyn Peeples (yellow card) 90+'	Stadium: Irvine Valley College Soccer Field; Referee: Adrian Gonzales; Assistant referees: Osvaldo Delgado-Landered; Juan Gonzales; Fourth official: Jessica Nila

=== Golden State ===
May 14 2	BYU Cougars	1–1	FC Golden State Force	Glendora, CA
8:00 p.m. MDT	Payden Pemberton (yellow card) 45'; Josh Hunter 45+'		Jimmy Turner (yellow card) 44'; Connor Gordon (yellow card) 82'; Jose Hernandez 90+'	Stadium: Citrus Stadium; Attendance: 288; Referee: Misha Radchuk; Assistant referees: Juan Gonzales; Edwar Hernandez; Fourth official: Randy Hoffman

=== Las Vegas ===
May 16 3	BYU Cougars	1–0	Las Vegas Mobsters	Las Vegas, NV
8:15 p.m. MDT	Pedro Vasconcelos 33'		(yellow card) 76'; (red card) 87'; (yellow card) 89'	Stadium: Valley High School Stadium

=== Burlingame ===
Broadcasters: Chad Sackett & Stephen Pemberton (YouTube)

May 21 4	Burlingame Dragons FC	1–2	BYU Cougars	Provo, UT
7:00 p.m. MDT	Brock Messenger 83'; Josh Smith (yellow card) 90'	Recap	Taylor Fankhauser 12'; Joshua Hunter 64'; Joshua Hunter (yellow card) 66'; Tanner Whitworth (yellow card) 80'; Cameron McLaughlin (yellow card) 90'	Stadium: South Stadium; Referee: Hamid Sadayhe

=== San Francisco ===
Broadcasters: Carla Swensen-Haslam & Daniel Haslam (YouTube)

May 26 5	San Francisco City FC	0–0	BYU Cougars	Provo, UT
7:00 p.m. MDT	Dylan Murphy (yellow card) 41'; Armando Flores (yellow card) 66'	Recap	Jacob Miles (yellow card) 71'; Pedro Vasconcelos (yellow card) 83'	Stadium: South Stadium; Referee: Blake Griffiths

=== San Francisco ===
Broadcasters: Chad Sackett & Matt Bain (YouTube)

May 28 6	San Francisco City FC	3–2	BYU Cougars	Provo, UT
7:00 p.m. MDT	Merlin Baus 29'; Jordan Hughes (yellow card) 31'; Robert Edwards 39'; Merlin Baus 68'; Ashley Watson (yellow card) 80'	Recap	Joshua Hunter 24'; Brendan Ottman (yellow card) 65'; Pedro Vasconcelos (yellow card) 65'; Emmanuel Lartey (yellow card) 69'; Ethan Meyer (yellow card) 77'; Jaiden Waggoner 90'	Stadium: South Stadium; Referee: Jeff Gaston; Assistant referees: Hensen Keetch; Daniel Escalante; Fourth official: Marcelo Chaparro

=== Las Vegas ===
Broadcasters: Carla Swensen-Haslam & Daniel Haslam (YouTube)

June 2 7	Las Vegas Mobsters	1–1	BYU Cougars	Provo, UT
7:00 p.m. MDT	Joshua Guzman 89'; Eric Bojado (yellow card) 71'; Robert Hines (yellow card) 87'	Recap	Payden Pemberton 58'; Tanner Whitworth (yellow card) 79'	Stadium: South Stadium; Referee: Marcello Chaparro; Assistant referees: Josh Mills; Daniel Fallis; Fourth official: TJ Zablocki

=== Fresno ===
Broadcasters: Chad Sackett (YouTube)

June 9 8	Fresno Fuego	2–0	BYU Cougars	Provo, UT
7:00 p.m. MDT	Christian Chaney 25'; BYU Own Goal 27'; Bruno Bramati (yellow card) 54'; Christian Chaney (yellow card) 65'; Fellipe Souza (yellow card) 86'	Recap	Joshua Hunter (yellow card) 32'	Stadium: South Stadium; Referee: Hamid Sadayhe; Assistant referees: Daniel Fallis; Danny Spicer Escalanta; Fourth official: Blake Griffiths

=== Fresno ===
Broadcasters: Carla Swensen-Haslam & Daniel Haslam (YouTube)

June 11 9	Fresno Fuego	3–1	BYU Cougars	Provo, UT
7:00 p.m. MDT	Christian Chaney 8'; Milton Blanco 15'; Christian Chaney (yellow card) 43'; Abraham Campos (yellow card) 64'; Peter Pearson 87'		Ethan Meyer 31'	Stadium: South Stadium; Referee: Blake Griffiths; Assistant referees: Sergio Navas; Josh Mills; Fourth official: Carston Gillwad

=== San Francisco ===
Broadcasters: Charles Wollin, Mike Geddes, & Shelley Alingas (YouTube)

June 16 10	BYU Cougars	1–0	San Francisco City FC	San Francisco, CA
8:00 p.m. MDT	Ethan Meyer 18'			Stadium: Kezar Stadium

=== Burlingame ===
June 18 11	BYU Cougars	1–0	Burlingame Dragons FC	Burlingame, CA
5:00 p.m. MDT	Pedro Vasconcelos 5'; Jacob Miles (yellow card) 35'		Kevin Partida (yellow card) 37'; Parker Holland (yellow card) 43'	Stadium: Burlingame High School Stadium

=== Fresno ===
Broadcaster: Jason Phillips & Adrian Luevano (YouTube)

June 30 12	BYU Cougars	0–2	Fresno Fuego	Fresno, CA
8:30 p.m. MDT				Stadium: Chukchansi Park

=== Burlingame ===
July 2 13	BYU Cougars	1–1	Burlingame Dragons FC	Burlingame, CA
5:00 p.m. MDT				Stadium: Burlingame High School Stadium

=== Golden State ===
Broadcasters: (YouTube)

July 13 14	FC Golden State Force	v	BYU Cougars	Provo, UT
7:00 p.m. MDT				Stadium: South Stadium

== Roster ==
No.	Position	Player	Year
0	GK	Taylor Watkins	Sophomore
2	F	Seth Fankhauser	Freshman
3	D	Jaiden Wagoner	Sophomore
4	MF	Josh Hunter	Senior
5	D	Ethan Meyer	Senior
6	MF	Payden Pemberton	Freshman
7	D	Ryan Botcherby	Sophomore
8	MF	Jake Miles	Junior
10	MF	Pedro Vasconeclos	Senior
11	F	Cameron McLaughlin	Sophomore
13	D	Emmanuel "Junior" Lartey	Junior
14	D	Tanner Whitworth	Sophomore
15	F	Christian Guthrie	Freshman
16	D	Michael Andreson	Sophomore
17	MD	Taylor Fankhauser	Sophomore
18	D	Connor Fordham	Sophomore
20	MF	Alfredo Gallegos	Freshman
22	D	Andrew Dossett	Sophomore
24	GK	Brenden Ottman	Junior
29	GK	Trevor LeSueur	Junior

== Standings ==
Pos	Team	Pld	W	L	T	GF	GA	GD	Pts	Qualification
1	Fresno Fuego (Note: Fresno Fuego deducted one point for illegal substitution against San Francisco City FC.)	14	10	3	1	23	11	+12	30	Advance to Western Conference Divisional Qualifiers
2	Burlingame Dragons FC	14	7	5	2	28	19	+9	23	Advance to Western Conference Divisional Qualifiers
3	San Francisco City FC	14	6	6	2	19	16	+3	20	
4	BYU Cougars	14	4	6	4	12	18	−6	16	
5	Las Vegas Mobsters	14	3	8	3	13	26	−13	12	

Source: Premier Development League
Rules for classification: Tiebreakers
