= Devyn Jambga =

American soccer player (born 1995)

Personal information
- Full name: Devyn Gwinyai Jambga
- Date of birth: September 19, 1995 (age 31)
- Place of birth: St. Louis, Missouri, U.S.
- Height: 5 ft 11 in (1.80 m)
- Position: Forward

College career
| Years | Team | Apps | (Gls) |
| 2013–2017 | SIU Edwardsville Cougars | 73 | (15) |

Senior career*
| Years | Team | Apps | (Gls) |
| 2016–2017 | Des Moines Menace | 23 | (7) |
| 2018 | Portland Timbers 2 | 5 | (0) |
| 2019 | FC Tucson | 25 | (5) |
| 2020 | South Georgia Tormenta | 13 | (1) |
- * Club domestic league appearances and goals as of 27 February 2021

Devyn Gwinyai Jambga (born September 19, 1995) is an American former soccer player who last played for South Georgia Tormenta in USL League One.

== Career ==
=== College ===
Jambga played college soccer at Southern Illinois University Edwardsville between 2013 and 2017, including a redshirted season in 2013. Jambga tallied 15 goals and 6 assists in 73 appearances for the Cougars.

While at college, Jambga appeared for Premier Development League side Des Moines Menace.

=== Professional ===
Jambga signed with United Soccer League side Portland Timbers 2 on March 2, 2018.

Jambga announced his retirement from professional soccer on his Instagram on February 27, 2021.

== Personal ==
Jambga was born in St. Louis, Missouri in the United States, but grew up in Harare in Zimbabwe. His parents both attended SIU Edwardsville; his father played soccer and his mother played softball.
