= Roberto Alarcón (footballer, born 1998) =

Spanish footballer

Personal information
- Full name: Roberto Alarcón Sáez
- Date of birth: 21 April 1998 (age 28)
- Place of birth: Palma de Mallorca, Spain
- Height: 1.75 m (5 ft 9 in)
- Position: Defender

Team information
- Current team: Eastern Suburbs
- Number: 7

Youth career
- RCD Mallorca

Senior career*
| Years | Team | Apps | (Gls) |
| 2018–2020 | RCD Mallorca B | 32 | (6) |
| 2018 | → Platges de Calvià (loan) | | |
| 2020 | FC Tucson | 16 | (2) |
| 2021–2022 | Universitatea Cluj | 9 | (0) |
| 2022–2023 | Cavalry FC | 26 | (0) |
| 2024–2025 | Valour FC | 47 | (0) |
| 2026- | Eastern Suburbs | 12 | (0) |
- * Club domestic league appearances and goals as of 25 July 2026

Roberto Alarcón Sáez (born 21 April 1998) is a Spanish professional footballer who plays as a defender for New Zealand amateur side Eastern Suburbs.

== Early life ==
Alarcón was born in Palma de Mallorca, Spain. He began playing youth football in the academy system of RCD Mallorca.

== Playing career ==
Alarcón began his senior career with RCD Mallorca B of the Tercera División. In January 2018, he went on loan to CF Platges de Calvià. He made his debut for Mallorca on 18 August 2018 against Poblense. He would go on to score five goals in his first season with the club, the first of which was scored on 27 October 2018 as Mallorca lost 3–2 to Platges de Calvià.

In January 2020, Alarcón signed with FC Tucson of USL League One. He made his league debut for the club on 25 July 2020, playing the entirety of a 2–1 away victory over Fort Lauderdale CF. He scored his first goal on 18 August against Orlando City B. In December, FC Tucson exercised their club option on Alarcón, however, prior to the season, he mutually agreed to terminate his contract at the club.

In September 2021, he signed with Romanian club Universitatea Cluj in Liga II. He had initially been set to join FC Brașov, however, upper management of the club decided not to sign him after he impressed in his trial. He made nine appearances for the club as they earned promotion to the top tier for the following season. In June 2022, he was released by the club.

In July 2022, Alarcón signed a contract with Canadian Premier League club Cavalry FC. In December 2022, Cavalry announced that he would be returning for the 2023 season, and that his contract had a club option for 2024. Upon completion of the 2023 season, the defender's club option for the 2024 season was declined, thus ending his time with the club.

On 15 December 2023, Alarcón officially joined fellow CPL side Valour FC on a free transfer, for the 2024 season. He made his debut on 14 April against Vancouver FC. After the 2024 season, the club picked up his option for the 2025 season.
