= Darryl Longdon =

Dominican footballer

Personal information
- Date of birth: November 8, 2000 (age 26)
- Place of birth: Bronx, New York City, U.S.
- Height: 1.70 m (5 ft 7 in)
- Position: Forward

Team information
- Current team: NCAA Division 2 School East Stroudsburg University

Youth career
- –2020: Racing Algemesi

Senior career*
Years	Team	Apps	(Gls)
2020	FC Tucson	6	(0)

International career^{‡}
2021–	Dominica	7	(1)
- * Club domestic league appearances and goals as of 25 October 2020 ‡ National team caps and goals as of 19:43, 6 April 2023 (UTC)

Darryl Longdon (born November 8, 2000) is a footballer who plays as a forward. Born in the United States, he represents Dominica national football team internationally.

== Early life and education ==
Longdon was born in The Bronx, New York City, on November 8, 2000. He attended East Stroudsburg High School South in East Stroudsburg, Pennsylvania. In 2017, he was named the All-Eastern Pennsylvania Conference Most Valuable Player in boys' soccer.

== Career ==
=== FC Tucson ===
Longdon made his league debut for the club on July 25, 2020, coming on as a 70th-minute substitute for Josh Coan in a 2–1 away victory over Fort Lauderdale CF.

=== Springfield Athletic SC ===
By 2023, Longdon had joined Springfield Athletic SC of the USL League Two.

=== East Stroudsburg University ===
Longdon now currently plays at NCAA Division II school East Stroudsburg that competes in the Pennsylvania Sports Athletic Conference (PSAC).

=== International career ===
Longdon received his first call-up to the Dominica national football team in March 2021, and stated that he was "thrilled to be on board" for the team's World Cup qualifying campaign. He made his senior international debut on 24 March 2021 against the Dominican Republic. He scored his first international goal the following year, netting the winner in a 2–1 friendly victory over Saint Vincent and the Grenadines.

=== International goals ===
Scores and results list Dominica's goal tally first, score column indicates score after each Longdon goal.

No	Date	Venue	Opponent	Score	Result	Competition
1.	12 May 2022	Windsor Park, Roseau, Dominica	Saint Vincent and the Grenadines	2–1	2–1	Friendly
Last updated 12 May 2022

=== International career statistics ===
As of matches played May 12, 2022

National team	Year	Apps	Goals
Dominica	2021	2	0
Dominica	2022	5	1
Total		7	1
