= Longden (surname) =

Longden is a surname. Notable people with the surname include:

- Ann Eliza Longden (1869–1952), British politician, first woman to serve as Lord Mayor of Sheffield
- Arthur Longden (1856–1924), New Zealand cricketer
- Billy Longden (born c. 1867), English footballer
- Colin Longden (born 1933), English footballer
- Cyril Longden (1873–1913), English colonial administrator
- Deric Longden (1936–2013), English writer and autobiographer
- Duncan Longden (1826–1904), British army officer and politician
- Fred Longden (1889–1952), British politician
- Gilbert Longden (1902–1997), British politician
- Henry Errington Longden (1819–1890), British Army officer
- James Robert Longden (1827–1891), English colonial administrator
- John Longden (1900–1971), English film actor
- John Longden (Mormon) (1898–1969), general authority of the LDS Church
- Johnny Longden (1907–2003), Anglo-American jockey
- Paul Longden (born 1962), English footballer
- Robert Longden (cricketer) (1817–1895), English clergyman and cricketer
- Robert Longden (actor) (born 1951), British actor and librettist
- Sean Longden (born 1965), English author and historian
- Susan Longden (born 1950), British athlete
- Vance Longden (1930–2003), American horse trainer

== See also ==
- Longden, English village
- Longdon (surname)
