= Longdon (surname) =

Longdon is a surname. Notable people with the surname include:

- Albert Longdon (1865–1937), English cricketer
- Anthony Longdon, Grenadian boxer
- Darryl Longdon (born 2000), American soccer player
- David Longdon (1965–2021), British musician
- Jennifer Longdon, American politician
- Remy Longdon (born 1997), English footballer
- Terence Longdon (1922–2011), English actor

== See also ==
- Longden (surname)
