= Elivelton (footballer, born 1995) =

Brazilian footballer

Personal information
- Full name: Elivelton Ubiratan Oliveira de Lima
- Date of birth: 13 October 1995 (age 31)
- Place of birth: Curitiba, Brazil
- Height: 1.71 m (5 ft 7 in)
- Position: Defender

Youth career
- –2016: Paraná

Senior career*
Years	Team	Apps	(Gls)
2016	São Joseense		
2017	Boa Esporte	10	(0)
2018–2020	Cascavel	10	(1)
2018	→ Fluminense do Itaum (loan)	18	(3)
2019	→ PSTC (loan)	6	(1)
2019	→ Atlético Itajaí (loan)	7	(1)
2020	→ FC Tucson (loan)	16	(3)
2021	Lagarto	9	(1)
2021–2022	Sergipe	37	(1)
2022–2023	Luverdense		
2023	Babrungas		
2024	PSTC	9	(1)
- * Club domestic league appearances and goals as of 17:27, 7 April 2024 (UTC)

Elivelton Ubiratan Oliveira de Lima (born 13 October 1995), commonly known as Elivelton, is a Brazilian footballer.

== Career statistics ==
=== Club ===
As of 16 September 2020.

Club	Season	League			State League		Cup		Other		Total	
Club	Season	Division	Apps	Goals	Apps	Goals	Apps	Goals	Apps	Goals	Apps	Goals
Boa Esporte	2017	Série B	1	0	9 (Note: Appearances in the Campeonato Mineiro – Módulo II)	0	2 (Note: Appearances in the Copa do Brasil)	0	0	0	12	0
Cascavel	2018	–			8 (Note: Appearances in the Campeonato Paranaense)	1	0	0	0	0	8	1
Cascavel	2019	–			2	0	0	0	0	0	2	0
Cascavel	2020	–			0	0	0	0	0	0	0	0
Cascavel	Total		0	0	10	1	0	0	0	0	10	1
Fluminense do Itaum (loan)	2018	–			18 (Note: Appearances in the Campeonato Catarinense - Série B)	3	0	0	0	0	18	3
PSTC (loan)	2019	–			6 (Note: Appearances in the Campeonato Paranaense - Segunda Divisão)	1	0	0	0	0	6	1
Atlético Itajaí (loan)	2019	–			7 (Note: Appearances in the Campeonato Catarinense - Série C)	1	0	0	0	0	7	1
FC Tucson (loan)	2020	USL League One	8	0	–		0	0	0	0	8	0
Career total			9	0	50	6	2	0	0	0	61	6
