= Roy Abergil =

Israeli footballer

Roy Abergil רועי אברג'יל
Personal information
- Date of birth: October 27, 1990 (age 36)
- Place of birth: Be'er Sheva, Israel
- Height: 1.82 m (6 ft 0 in)
- Position: Forward

College career
Years	Team	Apps	(Gls)
2013–2016	Colorado Mesa Mavericks	65	(49)

Senior career*
Years	Team	Apps	(Gls)
2011–2012	Maccabi Be'er Sheva	0	(0)
2012	→ F.C. Be'er Sheva (loan)	13	(4)
2017	Bnei Yehuda	0	(0)
2018	SC Dimona	7	(2)
2018	Maccabi Kiryat Gat	0	(0)
2018–2019	F.C. Shikun HaMizrah	15	(4)
2019	FC Tucson	7	(0)
2019–2020	Hapoel Yeruham	16	(4)
2020	Beitar Yavne	4	(2)
2020	F.C. Arad	3	(0)
2020–2021	F.C. Be'er Sheva	11	(5)
- * Club domestic league appearances and goals

Roy Abergil (Hebrew: רועי אברג'יל; born 27 October 1990) is an Israeli footballer who plays as a forward.
