= Guillermo Delgado (footballer, born 1994) =

Spanish footballer

Personal information
- Full name: Guillermo León Delgado
- Date of birth: 8 July 1994 (age 32)
- Place of birth: Madrid, Spain
- Height: 1.75 m (5 ft 9 in)
- Position: Forward

Youth career
- Getafe

College career
| Years | Team | Apps | (Gls) |
| 2013–2016 | Delaware Fightin' Blue Hens | 78 | (49) |

Senior career*
| Years | Team | Apps | (Gls) |
| 2014 | Reading United AC | | |
| 2015–2016 | Seattle Sounders FC U-23 | 23 | (9) |
| 2018 | Rio Grande Valley FC | 7 | (1) |
| 2019 | FC Tucson | 24 | (3) |
- * Club domestic league appearances and goals as of 21 October 2019

Guillermo León Delgado (born 8 July 1994) is a Spanish footballer.

== Career ==
=== Youth and college ===
Delgado played four years of college soccer at the University of Delaware between 2013 and 2016. Delgado is one of the most decorated student-athletes in University of Delaware history, finishing his four-year career with the Blue Hens as the school's all-time leader in five statistical categories: points, goals, assists, game-winning goals, and shots.

While at college, Delgado played with USL PDL sides Reading United & Seattle Sounders FC U-23.

=== Professional ===
On 13 January 2017, Delgado was selected 27th overall in the 2017 MLS SuperDraft by Chicago Fire. However, he wasn't signed by the club.

Delgado joined United Soccer League side Rio Grande Valley FC Toros in March 2018. He made his professional debut on 16 March 2018 in a 1–1 draw with Saint Louis FC.

On 28 January 2019, Delgado joined FC Tucson ahead of their first season in USL League One.
