= Luke Hauswirth =

American soccer player

Personal information
- Date of birth: October 11, 1995 (age 31)
- Place of birth: Woodbury, Minnesota, United States
- Height: 1.78 m (5 ft 10 in)
- Position: Defender

Team information
- Current team: Crossfire Redmond

College career
Years	Team	Apps	(Gls)
2014–2018	Washington Huskies	74	(3)

Senior career*
Years	Team	Apps	(Gls)
2017	Detroit City	6	(0)
2019	FC Tucson	24	(0)
2020	Union Omaha	11	(1)
2023	Crossfire Redmond		
- * Club domestic league appearances and goals as of October 25, 2020

Luke Hauswirth (born October 11, 1995) is an American soccer player who plays as a defender.
