= Southwestern Showdown =

- Other names: Battle for "The Golden Rattler"
- Location: Southwestern United States
- Teams: Albuquerque Sol FC; FC Tucson
- First meeting: Albuquerque 1–1 Tucson; June 6, 2014
- Latest meeting: Tucson 2–1 Albuquerque; July 3, 2017

Statistics
- Total meetings: 12 (9–2–1 Tucson)
- All-time series: 4–0 (Tucson)
- Largest victory: Tucson 5–0 Albuquerque; July 13, 2016

The Southwestern Showdown is an annual rivalry series first held in 2014 between FC Tucson and Albuquerque Sol FC, soccer clubs in USL League Two. The club to gain the most league standings points over the course of all regular-season meetings is given the Golden Rattler, a trophy depicting a rattlesnake ready to strike, to hold for the following year.

== Inaugural series ==
The first ever match between the two clubs was held on June 6, 2014 at Ben Rios Field in Albuquerque, a 1–1 draw. A day later on the same field Tucson won 3–0. Tucson secured both the 2014 series (7–1) and the Mountain Division title with a 1–0 victory in the final match, held in Tucson on July 4 at the Kino Sports Complex North Stadium.

== Results ==
Three league standings points are awarded for a victory and one for a draw. In the event that the two clubs earn an equal number of league points in their regular-season head-to-head matches, the series tie is broken first by total goals scored within the matches (aggregate score) and then by Mountain Division standings at the end of the regular season.

██	Albuquerque Sol FC victory
██	FC Tucson victory
██	Draw

Series results		Individual game results			
Year	Points	Venue	Date	Score	References
2014	7 – 1 (FCT)	Ben Rios Field	June 6, 2014	ABQ 1 – 1 FCT	
2014	7 – 1 (FCT)	Ben Rios Field	June 7, 2014	ABQ 0 – 3 FCT	
2014	7 – 1 (FCT)	Kino North Stadium	July 4, 2014	FCT 1 – 0 ABQ	
2015	3 – 3 (FCT)*	Ben Rios Field	June 6, 2015	ABQ 1 – 0 FCT	
2015	3 – 3 (FCT)*	Kino North Stadium	July 4, 2015	FCT 2 – 0 ABQ	
2015	post season	Kino North Stadium	July 18, 2015	FCT 2 – 1 ABQ	
2016	6 – 0 (FCT)	UNM Soccer Stadium	June 25, 2016	ABQ 0 – 2 FCT	
2016	6 – 0 (FCT)	Kino North Stadium	July 13, 2016	FCT 5 – 0 ABQ	
2017	10 – 1 (FCT)	Ben Rios Field	May 20, 2017	ABQ 2 – 4 FCT	
2017	10 – 1 (FCT)	Kino North Stadium	June 24, 2017	FCT 3 – 1 ABQ	
2017	10 – 1 (FCT)	UNM Soccer Stadium	July 1, 2017	ABQ 2 – 2 FCT	
2017	10 – 1 (FCT)	Kino North Stadium	July 3, 2017	FCT 3 – 1 ABQ	

* Series tie broken by aggregate score.
