= Benjamin Knight (disambiguation) =

Benjamin Knight was an industrialist.

Ben(jamin) Knight may also refer to:

- Ben Knight (actor) (born 1975), Australian actor
- Benjamin Knight (politician) (1836–1905), member of the California legislature
- Ben Knight (footballer) (born 2002), English footballer
- President Benjamin Knight (fictional), List of fictional presidents of the United States
- Invisible: The Chronicles of Benjamin Knight, film starring Alan Oppenheimer
