= Dženan Ćatić =

Bosnian footballer

Personal information
- Date of birth: May 26, 1992 (age 34)
- Place of birth: Jablanica, Bosnia and Herzegovina
- Height: 6 ft 3 in (1.91 m)
- Position: Forward

Youth career
- Michigan Wolves
- 2011–2012: 1. FC Kaiserslautern

College career
Years	Team	Apps	(Gls)
2013–2014	Davenport Panthers		

Senior career*
Years	Team	Apps	(Gls)
2011–2012	1. FC Kaiserslautern II	5	(1)
2014	Michigan Bucks	14	(16)
2015	Philadelphia Union	0	(0)
2015	→ Harrisburg City Islanders (loan)	5	(0)
2015	→ Carolina RailHawks (loan)	4	(0)
2015	→ Harrisburg City Islanders (loan)	2	(0)
2015	→ Carolina RailHawks (loan)	5	(0)
2016	Rio Grande Valley FC	16	(6)
- * Club domestic league appearances and goals

Dženan Ćatić (born May 26, 1992) is a Bosnian former footballer who played as a forward.

== Playing career ==
=== College and youth ===
Ćatić attended East Kentwood High School. After graduation he spent time with the youth team and second team of German club 1. FC Kaiserslautern, Catic moved back to the United States to play NAIA college soccer at Davenport University.

While at college, Catic played with USL PDL club Michigan Bucks during their 2014–15 season, where he scored 16 goals in 14 appearances.

=== Professional ===
On January 15, 2015, Catic was selected 31st overall in the 2015 MLS SuperDraft by Philadelphia Union. He signed with the club on March 1, 2015.

Catic was loaned to the Union's USL partner club Harrisburg City Islanders in March 2015.

Catic signed with USL club Rio Grande Valley FC Toros on February 1, 2016. Catic opted to miss the 2017 season due to concussion.

== Coaching career ==
In 2017, Catic joined the Davenport Panthers as an assistant coach in 2017.

== Personal life ==
Ćatić is a dual citizen of the United States and Bosnia and Herzegovina.
