= José Terrón (footballer) =

Spanish footballer

Personal information
- Full name: José Carlos Terrón Arroyo
- Date of birth: 15 April 1991 (age 35)
- Place of birth: Torrelavega, Spain
- Height: 5 ft 9 in (1.75 m)
- Position: Defender

Youth career
- –2004: Racing de Santander
- 2004–2010: Barcelona
- 2010: Gimnástica de Torrelavega
- 2010–2012: Terrassa
- 2011: → Parma (loan)

Senior career*
Years	Team	Apps	(Gls)
2012–2013	Sestao River	30	(0)
2013–2014	Osasuna B		
2014	Burgos	4	(0)
2014–2015	Conquense	6	(0)
2016	Lane United	13	(1)
2016–2018	Barreda Balompié	29	(3)
2018	Laredo	17	(0)
2019	Barreda Balompié	2	(0)
2019	FC Tucson	19	(1)
- * Club domestic league appearances and goals as of 20 July 2020

José Carlos Terrón Arroyo (born 15 April 1991) is a Spanish footballer who plays as a defender.

== Career statistics ==
=== Club ===
As of 18 May 2019.

Club	Season	League			Cup		Continental		Other		Total	
Club	Season	Division	Apps	Goals	Apps	Goals	Apps	Goals	Apps	Goals	Apps	Goals
Sestao River	2012–13	Segunda División B	30	0	0	0	–		0	0	30	0
Burgos	2013–14	Segunda División B	4	0	0	0	–		0	0	4	0
Conquense	2014–15	Segunda División B	6	0	0	0	–		0	0	6	0
Laredo	2018–19	Tercera División	17	0	0	0	–		0	0	17	0
Barreda Balompié	2018–19	Tercera División	2	0	0	0	–		0	0	2	0
Tucson	2019	USL League One	3	0	0	0	–		0	0	3	0
Career total			62	0	0	0	0	0	0	0	62	0
