= Christopher Hellmann =

German footballer

Personal information
- Date of birth: 16 October 1992 (age 34)
- Place of birth: Cologne, Germany
- Height: 1.83 m (6 ft 0 in)
- Position: Winger

Youth career
- FC Astoria Walldorf

College career
Years	Team	Apps	(Gls)
2013–2015	Lynn Fighting Knights	45	(49)

Senior career*
Years	Team	Apps	(Gls)
2011–2013	FC Astoria Walldorf	45	(2)
2014–2015	Des Moines Menace	21	(15)
2016	Charlotte Independence	8	(0)
2016–2018	FC Astoria Walldorf	40	(11)
2018	Des Moines Menace	5	(0)
2019	South Georgia Tormenta	5	(1)
2019–2020	1. FC Mühlhausen		
- * Club domestic league appearances and goals

Christopher Hellmann (born 16 October 1992) is a German former professional footballer who played as a winger.

== Career ==
Hellmann played for two seasons with German side FC Astoria Walldorf between 2011 and 2013, before accepting a scholarship to play college soccer at Lynn University, where he played until 2015. Hellmann also spent the 2014 and 2015 off-season playing with Premier Development League side Des Moines Menace.

On 14 January 2016, Vancouver Whitecaps FC selected Hellmann 29th overall in the 2016 MLS SuperDraft. However, Hellmann was not signed by Vancouver, later signing with United Soccer League side Charlotte Independence on 2 March 2016.

He left Charlotte in June 2016, and signed with German Regionalliga Südwest side FC Astoria Walldorf.
