= Josh Coan =

American soccer player

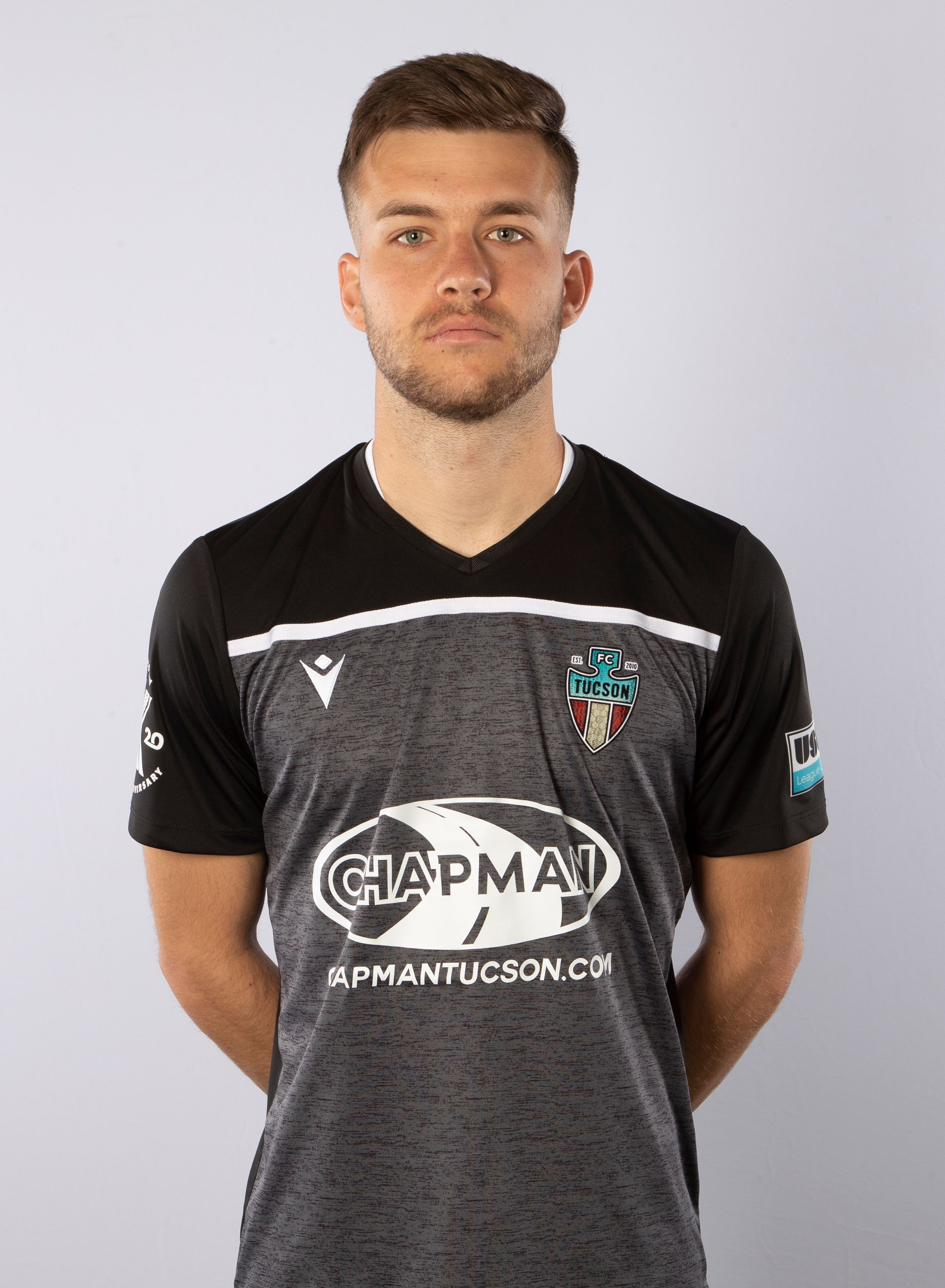

Personal information
- Full name: Joshua Coan
- Date of birth: February 21, 1998 (age 28)
- Place of birth: Indianapolis, Indiana, United States
- Height: 5 ft 9 in (1.75 m)
- Position: Winger

Youth career
- 2013–2015: Indiana Fire
- 2015–2016: North Carolina FC

College career
Years	Team	Apps	(Gls)
2016–2017	Pittsburgh Panthers	32	(0)
2018–2019	Marquette Golden Eagles	37	(9)

Senior career*
Years	Team	Apps	(Gls)
2017	North Carolina FC U23	4	(1)
2018	IMG Academy Bradenton	11	(7)
2019	Des Moines Menace	0	(0)
2019	Chicago FC United	3	(1)
2020	FC Tucson	11	(4)
2021	North Carolina FC	28	(3)
2022–2023	Sporting Kansas City II	41	(8)
- * Club domestic league appearances and goals as of April 3, 2024

Joshua Coan (born February 21, 1998) is an American professional soccer player who plays as midfielder or winger.

== Playing career ==
=== Youth, college and amateur ===
Coan played with the academy teams at Indiana Fire and North Carolina FC.

Coan began playing college soccer at the University of Pittsburgh in 2016, where he played for two seasons, making 32 appearances and tallying 4 assists. In 2018, Coan transferred to Marquette University for his junior and senior year. At Marquette, Coan made 37 appearances, scoring 9 goals and tallying 7 assists.

While at college, Coan appeared for various USL League Two sides, including spells with North Carolina FC U23, IMG Academy Bradenton, Des Moines Menace and Chicago FC United.

=== Professional ===
On January 15, 2020, Coan signed with USL League One side FC Tucson.

Coan moved to USL League One side North Carolina FC on February 9, 2021.

On February 18, 2022, Coan signed with MLS Next Pro club Sporting Kansas City II.
