= Albuquerque Sol FC =

- Full name: Albuquerque Sol Football Club
- Founded: 2013; 13 years ago
- Stadium: Ben Rios Field; Albuquerque, New Mexico UNM Soccer Complex
- Capacity: 1,500 (St. Pius), 6,200 (UNM Soccer Complex)
- President: Larry Espinoza (interim)
- General Manager: Larry Espinoza
- Coach: Justin Sells
- League: USL League Two
- 2019: 4th, Mountain Division; Playoffs: DNQ
- Website: http://www.abqsolfc.com/
Home colours	Away colours

Albuquerque Sol FC is an American soccer club based in Albuquerque, New Mexico. Co-founded by Ron Patel and Larry Espinoza in 2013, the team plays in USL League Two, the fourth tier of the American soccer pyramid.

== History ==
=== Inaugural season (2014) ===
On May 3, 2014, Albuquerque Sol F.C. opened its season on the road against the Las Vegas Mobsters in Las Vegas, Nevada. The Sol lost its first ever game 1–0. The following week, they traveled to Highlands Ranch, Colorado for a two-match series against the Real Colorado Foxes. The first match resulted in a scoreless draw, but the second match featured the Sol's first ever goal (a tally from Ricardo Perez in the 60th minute) and first ever win, a 2–1 victory over the Foxes on Saturday, May 10. The Sol opened their home slate at Ben Rios Field on May 24, 2014 against the Midland/Odessa Sockers, a 1–2 loss before a crowd of 1,318. The 2014 edition of the Sol were competitive, obtaining a result in nine of their fourteen matches, but they were only able to secure 15 points and finished outside the USL PDL Mountain Division playoffs.

=== Early years (2015–2018) ===
On July 18, 2015, Albuquerque Sol F.C. played its first playoff game against FC Tucson at the Kino Sports Complex in Tucson, Arizona. The Sol lost that game 2–1.

=== Post-Ron Patel era (2018–present) ===
On April 19, 2018, Ron Patel stepped down from Albuquerque Sol F.C. to pursue another in-state project. Co-founder and general manager Espinoza announced that he would double as President in an interim capacity with anticipation that a new full-time club manager would be filled by the end of the 2018 season.

== Year-by-year ==
Year	Division	League	Regular season	Playoffs	Open Cup
2014	4	USL PDL	3rd, Mountain	Did not qualify	Did not qualify
2015	4	USL PDL	2nd, Mountain	First round	Did not qualify
2016	4	USL PDL	5th, Mid South	Did not qualify	1st Round
2017	4	USL PDL	5th, Mountain	Did not qualify	Did not qualify
2018	4	USL PDL	3rd, Mountain	Did not qualify	Did not qualify
2019	4	USL League Two	4th, Mountain	Did not qualify	Did not qualify

== Club culture ==
=== Supporters ===
Albuquerque Sol FC's official supporters group is the Sol Mates. In addition to the Sol Mates, there is an unofficial supporters group, the Sandianistas, which formed shortly after the club's inception in late 2013. The supporters sit in the west end of Ben Rios Field for all home matches.

=== Rivalries ===
The Sol compete with FC Tucson in the Southwestern Showdown, an annual series for the right to hold the "Golden Rattler" trophy for the following year. Albuquerque has also competed with FC Tucson and Las Vegas Mobsters for the Copa Frontera, a supporter-created trophy for clubs in the PDL Mountain Division with active supporter cultures.

=== Retired numbers ===
- 4 – (United States) Patrick Grange (Forward)

At halftime of the Sol's home finale on July 12, 2014, the club retired its No. 4 jersey in commemoration of Grange's impact on local soccer as well as to raise awareness for ALS (amyotrophic lateral sclerosis), the disease which claimed Grange's life in 2012.

== Head coaches ==
- (England) Chris Cartlidge (2014)
- (England) Matt Gordon (2015–2017)
- (United States) Justin Sells (2018–present)
