= Las Vegas Mobsters =

- Full name: Las Vegas Mobsters
- Nickname: The Mobsters
- Founded: 2013
- Dissolved: 2024
- Stadium: Viper Sports Complex; Las Vegas, Nevada
- Chairman: Martin Melendrez
- Manager: George McKenna
- League: United Premier Soccer League
- 2023: 2, Central Pacific Division; Playoffs:semifinal
| Home colours | Away colours |

Las Vegas Mobsters was an American soccer team based in Las Vegas, Nevada. Founded in 2013, the team played in the Nevada Premier League, an affiliate of NISA Nation, the fifth tier of the American Soccer Pyramid, in the Nevada Division. Their inaugural season was in 2014, competing in the Western Conference of the Premier Development League. The Mobsters finished 4th in the Mountain Division their first season.

In 2017, they joined the United Premier Soccer League before the Nevada Division folded halfway through its first season. The club went on hiatus until 2023, when the UPSL Regional Cup was established that summer.

== Year-by-year ==
| Year | Division | League | Regular season | Playoffs | Open Cup |
|---|---|---|---|---|---|
| 2014 | 4 | USL PDL | 4th, Mountain | Did not qualify | Did not qualify |
| 2015 | 4 | USL PDL | 3rd, Mountain | Did not qualify | Did not qualify |
| 2016 | 4 | USL PDL | 5th, Central Pacific | Did not qualify | Did not qualify |
| 2017 Spring | 5 | UPSL | N/A, Nevada | N/A | N/A |
| 2023 Summer | 5 | UPSL | N/A | Spring Las Vegas Cup Champion | N/A |
| 2023 Fall | 5 | NPL | 3rd | Semifinals | Did not qualify |
| 2024 Spring | 5 | NPL | | | Did not qualify |

== Players ==
=== Current roster ===
As of May 18, 2015.

Note: Flags indicate national team as defined under FIFA eligibility rules; some limited exceptions apply. Players may hold more than one non-FIFA nationality.

| No. | Pos. | Nation | Player |
|---|---|---|---|
| 0 | GK | | Alex Clewis |
| 0 | GK | | Daniel Diaz |
| 0 | GK | | Hector Casillas |
| 0 | GK | | Angel Alvarez |
| 0 | GK | | Cesar Valverde |
| 1 | DF | | Sebastion Hernandez |
| 2 | DF | | Robert Hines |
| 3 | DF | | Griffin Mallas |
| 4 | DF | | Eric Bojado |
| 5 | DF | | Forrest Smith |
| 6 | DF | | Cobi Hunt |
| 7 | DF | | Luis Ponce Hernandez |
| 8 | DF | | Roberto Rivera |
| 9 | MF | | Julian Portugal |

| No. | Pos. | Nation | Player |
|---|---|---|---|
| 10 | MF | | Milan Popovic |
| 11 | MF | | Carlos Lara |
| 12 | MF | | Jackson Collins |
| 13 | MF | | Mathew DeQuiroz |
| 14 | MF | | Mario Erpel |
| 15 | MF | | Jordan Jones |
| 16 | MF | | Fausto Urrutia |
| 17 | FW | | Naia Graham |
| 18 | FW | | Esteban Berumen |
| 19 | FW | | Oscar Velasquez |
| 20 | FW | | Robert Garcia |
| 21 | FW | | Gouedan Halley |
| 22 | FW | | Joshua Guzman |
| 23 | FW | | Ruben Duran |

=== Current staff ===
As of December 2016

- Martin Melendrez - Chief Financial Officer
- George McKenna - Head Coach
- Kyle McKenna - Assistant Coach
- Julian Portugal - Strength and Conditioning Coach
- Tyler Scull - General Manager
- Forrest Smith - Director of Player Development
- John Fayeghi - Director of Hospitality and Entertainment
- Tyson Johnson - Director of Marketing
- Theresa Lloyd - Club Administrator
- Christian Soler - Director of Social Media and Media Relations

== Club Culture ==
=== Supporters ===
Locals organized a Las Vegas Mobsters supporters group called the Mob Squad during the Mobsters inaugural season . The Mob Squad evolved to the Electric Company in 2017 with the founding of the Las Vegas Lights.

=== Rivalries ===
In 2015 the members of the Mob Squad along with FC Tucson supporters Cactus Pricks, and Albuquerque Sol FC supporters the Sandianistas announced the Copa Frontera, an annual series with Las Vegas Mobsters, FC Tucson and Albuquerque Sol FC, all current PDL teams in the Western Conference's newly-formed Mountain Division. The club earning the most points in the 6 regular-season meetings is awarded The Copa Frontera Trophy for the following year.
