= FC Tucson =

Association football club based in Tucson, Arizona

- Full name: Football Club Tucson
- Founded: October 10, 2010; 16 years ago
- Stadium: Kino North Stadium
- Capacity: 3,200
- Owner(s): Jon Pearlman; Jeff Arnold
- Head coach: Sebastian Pineda
- League: USL League Two
- 2026: 2nd, Southwest Division; Playoffs: qualified
- Website: fctucson.com
Home colors	Away colors

Football Club Tucson is an American soccer club based in Tucson, Arizona that plays in USL League Two. The club has an amateur women's team, FC Tucson Women, that play in the WPSL. Organized in 2010, the club first fielded a team in March 2011, then joined the Premier Development League (PDL; now known as USL League Two) Western Conference in 2012. in 2018, FC Tucson was a founding member of USL League One, where they played from 2019 to 2022. At the conclusion of the 2022 season, the ownership group changed and the team self-relegated back to USL League Two.

Tucson plays their home games at the 3,200-seat Kino Sports Complex North Stadium constructed in 2013.

== History ==
=== Beginnings ===
FC Tucson was founded in 2010 to bring preseason Major League Soccer events to Tucson and generate interest in a new soccer club. The organization first fielded a team on March 4, 2011 against the New York Red Bulls reserves in the 2011 Desert Cup, a 3–1 loss. The club's first goal was scored by former Pima Community College and Salpointe Catholic High School player Fernando Gauna after entering the match as a substitute. Later in 2011 Tucson competed against various teams from the region in a loosely organized exhibition league. Their first match following the Desert Cup took place on May 13, a 7–2 victory over Yavapai FC. On December 15, 2011, FC Tucson announced its move to the PDL.

=== Early PDL and Open Cup success ===
In its first season of play in the United Soccer League's Premier Development League (USL PDL, now USL League Two) the team placed second in the Western Conference Southwest Division with a record of 9 wins, 3 losses and 4 ties, riding a ten-game unbeaten streak (7 wins, 3 ties) from May 12 until June 30. In postseason play Tucson lost 2–1 to Seattle Sounders FC U-23 in the Western Conference Semi-Finals. Defender Conor Spence was named to the All-Western Conference Team. The club was named 2012 PDL Rookie Franchise of the Year.

In May 2013 FC Tucson notched back-to-back victories over professional clubs to reach the third round of the 2013 Lamar Hunt U.S. Open Cup. In the tournament's first round Tucson defeated Phoenix FC of the USL Pro 2–1 on an injury-time game winner scored by Connor Bevans. Next they defeated the San Antonio Scorpions of the NASL in a 4–3 penalty shoot-out to break a 2–2 tie. The run ended in Houston where they fell 2–0 to the MLS Dynamo. As the first ever PDL club to defeat professional clubs in back-to-back matches, Tucson won the full $15,000 prize awarded to the PDL club with the best Open Cup finish. (Three other PDL teams also reached the third round.) Tucson did not qualify for the PDL postseason in 2013, finishing fifth in the Southwest with five wins, five losses, and 4 draws.

=== Mountain Division Dominance ===
In 2014, competing in the newly created Mountain Division, FC Tucson won its first division title with 11 wins, 1 draw, and 2 losses in league play. The club recorded its first ever playoff victory with a 2–1 win over the Los Angeles Misioneros in Las Vegas. The best regular-season record in the Western Conference earned Tucson the right to host the conference final four at Kino North Stadium where they defeated the Vancouver Whitecaps FC U-23 1–0 in the conference semifinals on a stoppage-time goal by Juan Sebastian De Rada. Tucson's postseason run came to an end in the Western Conference Championship game with a 3–0 loss to the Kitsap Pumas. Team captain Ricardo Velazco, a midfielder, was named PDL Young (U21) Player of the Year. Billy Thompson was named PDL Goalkeeper of the Year. Both players were named to the All-League and All-Western Conference Teams. FC Tucson was named PDL Organization of the Year.

Tucson claimed its second-straight Mountain Division title in 2015 with a record of 8–2–4 in regular-season Premier Development League play. Their two losses came against Albuquerque Sol FC on the road and Real Colorado at home. In a July 4 home rematch against Albuquerque Tucson won 2–0 to claim the 2015 Southwestern Showdown rivalry series and retain possession of the Golden Rattler trophy. Tucson's regular season concluded with four straight wins: at home against Real Colorado and against the Sol, and on the road against the Southwest Division's Fresno Fuego and OC Blues U23. The streak put Tucson one point ahead of the Sol in the final PDL Mountain Division standings.

Tucson defeated Albuquerque 2–1 at home in the 2015 postseason qualifier, and once again was selected to host the Western Conference final four. After beating the previously-undefeated Kitsap Pumas 4–1 in the semis, the home side lost in the conference championship for the second-straight year, this time to the Seattle Sounders FC U-23 by a score of 2–1. Forward Pedro Espindola and Defender Kalem Scott were named to the All-Western Conference team.

=== Professional ===
FC Tucson was purchased by Phoenix Rising FC of the United Soccer League, now known as the USL Championship, on October 11, 2017, and initially served as its PDL affiliate. The 2018 season was ultimately FC Tucson's last in the PDL, since renamed USL League Two.

FC Tucson became the second team (and the first pre-existing team) to join the USL Division III league (later renamed USL League One) on February 6, 2018. Thus, the team became fully professional.

On February 18, 2021, FC Tucson announced that Benevolent Sports Tucson LLC, led by Brett Johnson, completed the transfer of ownership from Phoenix Rising FC. The team was no longer affiliated with Rising FC and was again eligible to participate in the U.S. Open Cup.

On October 18, 2022, following a 10th place finish in USL League One, Benevolent Sports Tucson announced the sale of the FC Tucson brand rights to an ownership group led by FC Tucson co-founder Jon Pearlman. As part of the transfer in ownership, FC Tucson also announced a self-relegation back to USL League Two for the 2023 season. The team retains the rights to a USL League One franchise, pending the construction of their own soccer-specific stadium.

==== Ownership ====
- FC Tucson Events, LLC (Greg Foster, Chris Keeney, Jon Pearlman & Rick Schantz) (until 2017)
- Phoenix Rising FC (2017–2021)
- Benevolent Sports Tucson, LLC (2021–2022)
- Jon Pearlman, Jeff Arnold (2022–present)

== Colors and badge ==
Tucson FC's official colors are red, black, and white.

FC Tucson's badge was designed by Erik von Weber prior to the 2011 Desert Cup. Similar in appearance to the traditional soccer shield, the badge is instead shaped like an arrowhead in homage to Tucson's pre-Columbian history. The badge was simplified in 2012 with the removal of five diamonds which arced above the crest to represent the major mountain ranges of the Tucson valley but had been confused with stars, typically used in football badges to represent titles won.

=== Sponsorship ===
Seasons	Shirt manufacturer	Shirt sponsor
2011–2012	Adidas	—
2013	Adidas	Audi Tucson
2014–2018	Adidas	Chapman Automotive
2019	Macron	Banner-University Medicine
2020	Macron	Chapman Automotive
2021	Puma	—
2022	Puma	Front: Quik Mart; Back: CARF International
2023	Champro Sports	Singularity Capital
2024	Adidas	Front: Singularity Capital; Sleeve: HJ3 Composite Technologies

== Stadium ==
- Murphey Field at Mulcahy Stadium (2011)
- Kino Sports Complex North Field #5 (2012–2013)
- Kino Sports Complex North Stadium (2014–present)

Kino North Stadium was dedicated on October 30, 2013. The stadium seats 2,900, with 1,800 in a partially-covered grandstand on the west sideline. The stadium's construction was part of a larger package of soccer facilities improvements to the Kino Sports Complex approved by Pima County's Board of Supervisors in April 2012. FC Tucson defeated MLS side Chivas USA 1–0 on November 15, 2013, in the first match held at the stadium.

== Club culture ==
=== Supporters ===
Members of the local American Outlaws chapter organized an FC Tucson supporters group called the Cactus Pricks after FC Tucson's 2011 Desert Cup appearance.

=== Rivalries ===
July 4th colors

In 2014 FC Tucson announced the Southwestern Showdown, an annual series with Albuquerque Sol FC, a PDL expansion team placed with Tucson in the Western Conference's newly formed Mountain Division. The club earning the most league points over all regular-season meetings is awarded "The Golden Rattler" trophy to hold for the following year. Ties are broken by goal difference or, if there is none, final division standings. For the final match of the series in both 2014 and 2015, the club wore red jerseys, white shorts, and blue socks in celebration of the 4th of July holiday. On both occasions, Tucson won to claim the series title.

La Copa Frontera, a supporters cup competition organized by the Cactus Pricks, the Las Vegas Mobsters' Mob Squad, and Albuquerque's Sandianistas, was organized in 2015. In that year the Sol claimed La Copa with a sweep of the Mobsters, despite ultimately finishing second to Tucson in head-to-head competition by virtue of goal difference.

== Record ==
=== Year-by-year ===
As of July 11, 2026

Season	Premier Development League								Playoffs	US Open Cup	Top Scorer ^{1}		Head coach
Season	P	W	L	D	GF	GA	Pts	Pos	Playoffs	US Open Cup	Player	Goals	Head coach
2012	16	9	3	4	21	16	31	2nd, Southwest	Conference Semifinals	Ineligible	(United States) Donny Toia	4	(United States) Rick Schantz
2013	14	5	5	4	31	17	19	5th, Southwest	Did not qualify	3R	(United States) David Clemens (United States) Gabriel Silveira	5	(United States) Rick Schantz
2014	14	11	2	1	35	11	34	1st, Mountain	Conference Final	Did not qualify	(United States) Ricardo Velazco	7	(United States) Rick Schantz
2015	14	8	2	4	28	15	28	1st, Mountain	Conference Final	1R	(United States) David Clemens	6	(United States) Rick Schantz
2016	14	11	1	2	38	12	35	1st, Southwest	Conference Final	2R	(Brazil) Afonso Pinheiro	9	(United States) Rick Schantz
2017	14	9	2	3	34	17	30	1st, Mountain	Conference Semifinals	2R	(Israel) Moshe Perez	12	(United States) Jon Pearlman
2018	14	7	3	4	29	19	25	2nd, Mountain	Conference Final	2R	(United States) Damian German	11	(United States) David Cosgrove
Season	USL League One								Playoffs	US Open Cup	Top Scorer ^{1}		Head coach
Season	P	W	L	D	GF	GA	Pts	Pos	Playoffs	US Open Cup	Player	Goals	Head coach
2019	28	8	11	9	35	41	33	8th	Did not qualify	Ineligible^{2}	(United States) Jordan Jones	10	(United States) Darren Sawatzky
2020	16	6	6	4	21	19	22	6th	Did not qualify	Ineligible^{2}	(Saint Vincent and the Grenadines) Shak Adams (United States) Josh Coan	4	(United States) John Galas
2021	28	11	10	7	44	42	40	4th	Semifinals	Cancelled	(England) Charlie Dennis	9	(United States) John Galas (2–4–3) (United States) Jon Pearlman (9–6–4)
2022	30	8	14	8	34	44	32	10th	Did not qualify	3R	(France) Louis Perez (United States) Donny Toia	5	(United States) Jon Pearlman
Season	USL League Two								Playoffs	US Open Cup	Top Scorer ^{1}		Head coach
Season	P	W	L	D	GF	GA	Pts	Pos	Playoffs	US Open Cup	Player	Goals	Head coach
2023	12	7	1	4	30	14	25	3rd, Southwest	Did not qualify	Did not qualify	(Spain) Jose Contell	5	(United States) Mark Biagi
2024	14	7	2	5	33	18	26	2nd, Southwest	National Semifinals	Did not qualify	(Colombia) Elian Aguilar	7	(Colombia) Sebastian Pineda
2025	12	7	2	3	55	11	24	2nd, Southwest	Conference Semifinals	Did not qualify	(Colombia) Elian Aguilar	10	(Colombia) Sebastian Pineda
2026	12	6	4	2	19	11	22	2nd, Southwest	Conference Quarterfinals	Did not qualify			

1. Top Scorer includes statistics from league matches only.

2. USL Championship owned team.

=== Head coaches ===
- Includes Regular Season, Playoffs & U.S. Open Cup. Excludes friendlies.

Coach	Nationality	Start	End	Games	Win	Loss	Draw	Win %
Rick Schantz	United States	October 10, 2010	January 8, 2017	83	49	19	15	59.04
Jon Pearlman	United States	January 9, 2017	December 22, 2017	17	10	4	3	58.82
David Cosgrove	United States	March 6, 2018	December 11, 2018	18	9	5	4	50.00
Darren Sawatzky	United States	December 12, 2018	November 6, 2019	28	8	11	9	28.57
John Galas	United States	December 24, 2019	June 30, 2021	25	8	10	7	32.00
Jon Pearlman (Interim)	United States	June 30, 2021	October 7, 2021	15	7	5	3	46.67
Jon Pearlman	United States	October 7, 2021	January 11, 2023	34	11	16	7	32.35
Mark Biagi	United States	January 12, 2023	November 1, 2023	12	7	1	4	58.33
Sebastian Pineda	Colombia	March 19, 2024	Present	18	10	3	5	55.56

== Players and staff ==
=== Staff ===
Front Office Staff
President & Technical Director	Jon Pearlman
Chairman	Jeff Arnold
Chief Operating Officer	Kyle Cornell
Technical Staff
Head coach & Academy Head coach	Sebastian Pineda
Assistant Head coach	Jon Pearlman
Goalkeeping Coach	Victor Verdugo
Head athletic trainer	Alee Vladyka
Director of Sports Medicine	Dr. Ty Endean

=== Notable former players ===
- (Spain) Jon Bakero
- (Guyana) Brandon Beresford
- (Lebanon) Majed Osman
- (United States) Justin Bilyeu
- (United States) Connor Brandt
- (United States) Aaron Long
- (United States) Aaron Herrera
- (United States) Kendall McIntosh
- (United States) Billy Thompson
- (United States) Donny Toia
- (United States) Christian Volesky
- (United States) Ricardo Velazco
- (United States) Kody Wakasa

== Honors ==
=== League ===
- USL League Two Western Conference
  - Champions (1): 2024
- USL PDL Mountain Division
  - Champions (3): 2014, 2015, 2017
- USL PDL Southwest Division
  - Champions (1): 2016

=== Player honors ===
Year	Pos	Player	Country	Honor
USL Premier Development League
2012	D	Conor Spence	USA	All-Western Conference Team
2014	M	Ricardo Velazco	USA	PDL Young (U21) Player of the Year; All-League Team; All-Western Conference Team
2014	G	Billy Thompson	USA	PDL Goalkeeper of the Year; All-League Team; All-Western Conference Team
2015	F	Pedro Espindola	BRA	All-Western Conference Team
2015	D	Kalem Scott	CAN	All-Western Conference Team
2016	D	Gordon Hall	CAN	All-Western Conference Team
2016	M	Michael Turner	USA	All-Western Conference Team
2017	M	Moshe Perez	ISR	All-League Team; All-Western Conference Team
2018	D	Henry Lander	ENG	All-Western Conference Team
USL League One
2019	F	Jordan Jones	USA	All-League Second Team
2021	M	Charlie Dennis	ENG	All-League Second Team
2021	D	Noah Franke	USA	All-League Second Team
2022	M	Louis Perez	FRA	All-League Second Team
