= 2021 Forward Madison FC season =

Forward Madison FC
2021 season
- Owner: Big Top Events
- Head coach: Carl Craig
- Stadium: Breese Stevens Field
- USL League One: 9th
- USL1 Playoffs: Did not qualify
- U.S. Open Cup: Cancelled
- Top goalscorer: Jake Keegan (6)
- Highest home attendance: 3,607 (June 30 vs. New England Revolution II)
- Lowest home attendance: 1,529 (May 15 vs. North Carolina FC)
- Average home league attendance: 2,761
- Biggest win: 2 goals: TRM 1–3 MAD (May 29)
- Biggest defeat: 3 goals: NTX 4–1 MAD (July 10)
Home colors	Away colors	Third colors

The 2021 Forward Madison FC season was the third season in the soccer team's history, where they compete in the third division of American soccer, USL League One.

== Club ==
=== Roster ===
As of September 8, 2021.

No.	Pos.	Nat.	Name	Date of birth (age)	Since
1	GK	(United States)	Phil Breno	December 11, 1995 (age 30)	2021
3	MF	(United States)	Eric Leonard	October 5, 1995 (age 31)	2018
4	DF	(United States)	Gustavo Fernandes	February 19, 1998 (age 28)	2020
5	DF	(United States)	Cyrus Rad	July 10, 1999 (age 27)	2021
6	MF	(Republic of Ireland)	Aaron Molloy	January 11, 1997 (age 29)	2021
7	FW	(United States)	Jake Keegan (captain)	April 21, 1991 (age 35)	2021
8	MF	(United States)	Michael Vang	May 13, 2000 (age 26)	2020
9	FW	(United States)	Ryan Sierakowski	August 7, 1997 (age 29)	2021
10	MF	(Spain)	Carlos Gómez	February 21, 1994 (age 32)	2021
11	DF	(United States)	Heath Martin	June 11, 2001 (age 25)	2021
13	DF	(United States)	Connor Tobin (captain)	February 11, 1987 (age 39)	2019
14	MF	(United States)	Taner Dogan	May 30, 1998 (age 28)	2021
17	FW	(United States)	Derek Gebhard	October 15, 1995 (age 30)	2021
19	MF	(United States)	Justin Sukow	September 19, 1998 (age 28)	2021
20	MF	(United States)	Audi Jepson	August 23, 1994 (age 32)	2021
22	MF	(United States)	Christian Enriquez	October 25, 1998 (age 27)	2021
23	FW	(United States)	Tyler Allen	October 12, 1998 (age 27)	2021
24	GK	(United States)	Aidan Hogan	April 23, 1997 (age 29)	2021
27	DF	(Mexico)	Christian Díaz	April 7, 1991 (age 35)	2019
31	FW	(United States)	Noah Fuson	December 31, 1999 (age 26)	2020
33	MF	(United States)	Jesús Pérez	October 1, 1997 (age 29)	2021
44	DF	(Trinidad and Tobago)	Josiah Trimmingham	December 14, 1996 (age 29)	2020
77	FW	(Panama)	Jiro Barriga Toyama	April 28, 1995 (age 31)	2019

=== Coaching staff ===
Name	Position
(England) Carl Craig	Head coach and technical director
(United States) Neil Hlavaty	Assistant coach
(United States) Jim Launder	Assistant coach
(United States) Eric Wilde	Assistant coach / Performance Analyst
(United States) Chris Stanton	Director of Soccer Operations and equipment manager
(United States) Emerson Lovato	Goalkeeper coach

=== Front office staff ===
Name	Position
(United States) Conor Caloia	Chief operating officer
(United States) Vern Stenman	President

== Transfers ==
=== Transfers in ===
Date from	Position	Player	Last team	Type	Ref.
January 26, 2021	FW	(United States) Jake Keegan	Greenville Triumph SC	Free transfer	
February 11, 2021	FW	(United States) Derek Gebhard	Charlotte Independence	Free transfer	
February 17, 2021	MF	(Republic of Ireland) Aaron Molloy	Portland Timbers 2	Free transfer	
February 25, 2021	FW	(United States) Tyler Allen	Reno 1868 FC	Free transfer	
March 3, 2021	GK	(United States) Phil Breno	Charleston Battery	Free transfer	
March 8, 2021	DF	(United States) Heath Martin	D.C. United Academy	Free transfer	
March 29, 2021	MF	(Spain) Carlos Gómez	Greenville Triumph SC	Free transfer	
April 22, 2021	MF	(United States) Justin Sukow	Reno 1868 FC	Free transfer	
April 28, 2021	MF	(United States) Audi Jepson	Saint Louis FC	Free transfer	
May 5, 2021	DF	(United States) Ronaldo Lomeli	University of California, Riverside	Free transfer	
May 6, 2021	GK	(United States) Aidan Hogan	Philadelphia Fury	Free transfer	
June 11, 2021	GK	(United States) Chris Brady	Chicago Fire FC	Loan	
June 18, 2021	MF	(United States) Christian Enriquez	San Diego 1904 FC	Free transfer	
July 24, 2021	MF	(United States) Javier Casas Jr.	Chicago Fire FC	Loan	
July 24, 2021	FW	(United States) Alex Monis	Chicago Fire FC	Loan	
July 31, 2021	MF	(United States) Jesús Pérez	(Republic of Ireland) Dundalk F.C.	Loan	
August 12, 2021	MF	(United States) Taner Dogan	(Republic of Ireland) Dundalk F.C.	Loan	
August 12, 2021	DF	(United States) Cyrus Rad	North Carolina State University	Free transfer	
August 20, 2021	FW	(United States) Ryan Sierakowski	New England Revolution II	Loan	

=== Transfers out ===
Date from	Position	Player	To	Type	Ref.
October 31, 2020	GK	(United States) Chris Brady	Chicago Fire FC	End of loan	
October 31, 2020	FW	(United States) Jamael Cox		Released	
October 31, 2020	MF	(United States) Brandon Eaton		Released	
October 31, 2020	DF	(United States) Eli Lockaby		Released	
October 31, 2020	GK	(Austria) Philipp Marceta		Released	
October 31, 2020	FW	(United States) Alex Monis	Chicago Fire FC	End of loan	
October 31, 2020	MF	(Tanzania) Vital Nizigiyimana		Released	
October 31, 2020	MF	(Chile) Adolfo Ovalle	(Canada) Toronto FC II	End of loan	
October 31, 2020	FW	(Brazil) Paulo Jr.		Released	
October 31, 2020	MF	(United States) Allan Rodríguez	Chicago Fire FC	End of loan	
December 14, 2020	FW	(Jamaica) Don Smart	Greenville Triumph SC	Free transfer	
February 5, 2021	FW	(United States) J. C. Banks		Retired	
February 18, 2021	DF	(United States) Jalen Crisler	Richmond Kickers	Free transfer	
April 6, 2021	DF	(United States) Carl Schneider	Michigan Stars FC	Free transfer	
June 1, 2021	FW	(United States) Wojciech Wojcik	Chicago House AC	Free transfer	
June 13, 2021	GK	(United States) Chris Brady	Chicago Fire FC	End of loan	
July 16, 2021	GK	(United States) Brandon Barnes	Chicago House AC	Free transfer	
July 25, 2021	MF	(United States) Javier Casas Jr.	Chicago Fire FC	End of loan	
July 25, 2021	FW	(United States) Alex Monis	Chicago Fire FC	End of loan	
August 2, 2021	MF	(United States) Louis Bennett II	Chicago House AC	Free transfer	
September 8, 2021	DF	(United States) Ronaldo Lomeli		Released	

== Kits ==
- Shirt sponsor: Dairyland Insurance
- Sleeve sponsor: Just Coffee Cooperative
- Shirt manufacturer: Hummel

Home
Away
Alternate 1
(side one)
Alternate 1
(side two)
Alternate 2

== Competitions ==
=== Exhibitions ===
April 7, 2021 Preseason 1	Chicago Fire FC	2–0	Forward Madison FC	Bridgeview, Illinois
12:00 PM CDT	Medrán 3'; Gutiérrez 68'	Report	Barriga Toyama (yellow card) 75'	Stadium: SeatGeek Stadium

April 17, 2021 Preseason 2	Indy Eleven	3–0	Forward Madison FC	Indianapolis, Indiana
1:00 PM EDT	Moon 50', (yellow card) 58'; Arteaga 65'; Hamilton 70'	Report	Lomeli (yellow card) 23'; Shibata (yellow card) 48'; Robinson (yellow card) 59' (red card) 83'	Stadium: Carroll Stadium

April 24, 2021 Preseason 3	Sporting Kansas City Reserves	0–1	Forward Madison FC	Kansas City, Missouri
2:00 PM CDT	(yellow card) 23'	Report	Vang 40'	Stadium: Swope Soccer Village
Note: SKC Reserves consists of players from both the Sporting Kansas City and Sporting Kansas City II rosters.

May 1, 2021 Preseason 4	Forward Madison FC	4–0	Milwaukee Bavarian SC	Madison, Wisconsin
11:00 AM CDT	Molloy 11'; Fernandes 24'; Tobin (yellow card) 31'; Keegan 70'; Gebhard 79' (pen.)	Report	Zamani (yellow card) 35'; Marshall (yellow card) 79'	Stadium: Breese Stevens Field

July 20, 2021 Midseason 1	Forward Madison FC (United States)	0–2	(Mexico) Atlético Morelia	Madison, Wisconsin
7:00 PM CDT		Report	Ibarra 24'; Barragán 43'; Martínez (yellow card) 78'; Gallegos (yellow card) 79'	Stadium: Breese Stevens Field; Attendance: 3,052

August 10, 2021 Midseason 2	Forward Madison FC	1–1	Wisconsin Badgers	Madison, Wisconsin
8:15 PM CDT	Vang (yellow card) 17'; Dogan (yellow card) 29'; Sukow 48'; Molloy (yellow card) 86'	Report	Klancnik (yellow card) 76'; Finnegan 83'	Stadium: Breese Stevens Field

September 7, 2021 Midseason 3	Forward Madison FC	6–0	Minneapolis City SC	Madison, Wisconsin
7:00 PM CDT	Molloy 27' (Sukow); Enriquez 43'; Sierakowski; Pérez 47'; Allen 50' (Vang); Enzugusi 60' (Rojas)	Report		Stadium: Breese Stevens Field

=== USL League One ===
==== Standings ====
Pos	Team	Pld	W	D	L	GF	GA	GD	Pts
7	Toronto FC II	28	10	8	10	34	32	+2	38
8	New England Revolution II	28	11	4	13	33	39	−6	37
9	Forward Madison FC	28	8	12	8	32	34	−2	36
10	Fort Lauderdale CF	28	8	7	13	40	49	−9	31
11	Tormenta FC	28	8	6	14	36	47	−11	30

Source: USL League One
Rules for classification: 1) points; 2) total wins; 3) total goal differential; 4) total goals scored; 5) points earned against top four Conference finishers; 6) disciplinary points; 7) drawing of lots.

==== Results summary ====
Overall								Home						Away					
Pld	W	D	L	GF	GA	GD	Pts	W	D	L	GF	GA	GD	W	D	L	GF	GA	GD
28	8	12	8	32	34	−2	36	6	6	2	16	13	+3	2	6	6	16	21	−5

Source: USL League One

==== Results by round ====
Round	1	2	3	4	5	6	7	8	9	10	11	12	13	14	15	16	17	18	19	20	21	22	23	24	25	26	27	28
Stadium	A	H	H	A	A	H	H	H	A	H	A	A	H	A	H	H	H	A	H	A	H	A	A	A	A	A	H	H
Result	D	W	W	W	D	L	D	L	D	W	L	D	D	D	W	D	D	L	W	D	D	L	L	L	L	W	D	W
Position	8	4	4	3	2	4	4	4	5	4	4	4	4	7	6	6	6	8	3	3	5	6	8	10	10	9	9	9

Source: USL League One
A = Away; H = Home; W = Win; D = Draw; L = Loss

==== Match results ====
May 8, 2021 1	FC Tucson	1–1	Forward Madison FC	Tucson, Arizona
7:00 PM MST	Franke (yellow card) 17'; Dennis (yellow card) 45+1'; Corfe 51'; Ferriol (yellow card) 82'	Report	Fernandes (yellow card) 20'; Barriga Toyama (yellow card) 28'; Keegan 67'; Molloy (yellow card) 81'	Stadium: Kino North Stadium; Attendance: 680; Referee: Joseph Salinas

May 15, 2021 2	Forward Madison FC	1–0	North Carolina FC	Madison, Wisconsin
7:00 PM CDT	Gebhard (yellow card) 35', (goal) 90+2'; Fernandes (yellow card) 45+1'	Report	Pearson (yellow card) 80'	Stadium: Breese Stevens Field; Attendance: 1,529; Referee: Calin Radosav

May 26, 2021 3	Forward Madison FC	1–0	Union Omaha	Madison, Wisconsin
7:00 PM CDT	Sukow 58' (Jepson); Fuson (yellow card) 90'	Report	Knutson (yellow card) 16'; Sousa (yellow card) 69'	Stadium: Breese Stevens Field; Attendance: 1,919; Referee: Nabil Bensalah

May 29, 2021 4	South Georgia Tormenta FC	1–3	Forward Madison FC	Statesboro, Georgia
7:00 PM EDT	Candela (yellow card) 22'; Mayr-Fälten 33'; Liadi (yellow card) 52'; Phelps (yellow card) 59'; Obinwa (yellow card) 79'; Eckenrode (yellow card) 88'	Report	Jepson (yellow card) 32'; Gebhard 49'; Tobin 54' (Molloy); Keegan (yellow card) 63', (goal) 82' (Sukow)	Stadium: Eagle Field at Erk Russell Athletic Park; Attendance: 1,009; Referee: Joshua Belk

June 1, 2021 5	Fort Lauderdale CF	2–2	Forward Madison FC	Fort Lauderdale, Florida
7:30 PM EDT	Evans (yellow card) 1'; Curry 25' (Acosta); Young (yellow card) 27'; Díaz 69' (o.g.); Azcona (yellow card) 72'	Report	Barriga Toyama (yellow card) 27'; Keegan 59' (Molloy); Fernandes (yellow card) 79'; Gebhard 85' (Jepson)	Stadium: DRV PNK Stadium; Referee: Natalie Simon

June 6, 2021 6	Forward Madison FC	1–2	Union Omaha	Madison, Wisconsin
5:00 PM CDT	Keegan 35'; Molloy (yellow card) 66'; Fernandes (yellow card) 90+1'	Report	Allen 7' (o.g.); Hurst (yellow card) 30'; Alihodžić 51' (Boyce), (yellow card) 59'	Stadium: Breese Stevens Field; Attendance: 2,195; Referee: Laura Chambers

June 12, 2021 7	Forward Madison FC	0–0	Richmond Kickers	Madison, Wisconsin
7:00 PM CDT	Barriga Toyama (yellow card) 53'; Tobin (yellow card) 55'; Díaz (yellow card) 59'; Gebhard (yellow card) 71'	Report	Morán (yellow card) 16'; Terzaghi (yellow card) 32'; Crisler (yellow card) 55'	Stadium: Breese Stevens Field; Attendance: 2,929; Referee: Laura Rodriguez

June 19, 2021 8	Forward Madison FC	0–2	New England Revolution II	Madison, Wisconsin
7:00 PM CDT	Gómez (yellow card) 36'; Díaz (yellow card) 49'; Molloy (yellow card) 54'	Report	Rozhansky (yellow card) 35'; Michel (yellow card) 42'; N. Buck 45+1' (Rennicks); Rice (yellow card) 45+1'; Presley (yellow card) 49'; Spaulding (yellow card) 53'; Tsicoulias 80' (Rozhansky); Ramirez (yellow card) 90+3'	Stadium: Breese Stevens Field; Attendance: 3,208; Referee: Chris Ruska

June 23, 2021 9	Greenville Triumph SC	2–2	Forward Madison FC	Greenville, South Carolina
7:00 PM EDT	Booth 29' (Gavilanes), (yellow card) 68'; Polak (yellow card) 32'; Lomis 68' (pen.); Hemmings (yellow card) 90+2'	Report	Molloy 12' (pen.), 15' (Keegan); Fuson (yellow card) 66'; Gebhard (yellow card) 71'; Barriga Toyama (yellow card) 88'	Stadium: Legacy Early College Field; Attendance: 2,311; Referee: Kyle Johnston

June 30, 2021 10	Forward Madison FC	1–0	New England Revolution II	Madison, Wisconsin
7:00 PM CDT	Keegan 20' (Díaz); Díaz (yellow card) 60'; Breno (yellow card) 90+2'	Report	Michel (yellow card) 42'; Rozhansky (yellow card) 48'	Stadium: Breese Stevens Field; Attendance: 3,607; Referee: Katherine McCormick

July 10, 2021 11	North Texas SC	4–1	Forward Madison FC	Arlington, Texas
8:00 PM CDT	Rayo 2' (Vargas), (yellow card) 63'; Munjoma 16' (ElMedkhar); Kazu 63' (Rayo), 74' (ElMedkhar)	Report	Keegan 81' (Sukow); Tobin (yellow card) 87'	Stadium: Globe Life Park; Attendance: 776; Referee: Melvin Rivas

July 16, 2021 12	Union Omaha	1–1	Forward Madison FC	Papillion, Nebraska
7:00 PM CDT	Boyce 11' (Doyle); N'For (yellow card) 31'	Report	Barriga Toyama (yellow card) 32'; Gebhard (yellow card) 60'; Tobin 67' (Molloy); Fernandes (yellow card) 74'	Stadium: Werner Park; Attendance: 3,304; Referee: Kevin Fikar

July 24, 2021 13	Forward Madison FC	1–1	Fort Lauderdale CF	Madison, Wisconsin
7:00 PM CDT	Barriga Toyama (yellow card) 21'; Leonard (yellow card) 32'; Fuson 39' (Barriga Toyama), (yellow card) 61'; Casas (yellow card) 56'; Monis (yellow card) 90+8'	Report	Poplawski (yellow card) 19'; Evans (yellow card) 65'; Reyes (yellow card) 82'; Méndez (yellow card) 90+2'; Neville (yellow card) 90+9'; Curry 90+10' (Rosales)	Stadium: Breese Stevens Field; Attendance: 3,572; Referee: Jervis Atagana

July 31, 2021 14	Chattanooga Red Wolves SC	1–1	Forward Madison FC	East Ridge, Tennessee
7:00 PM EDT	Carrera García 6' (Dietrich); Dietrich (yellow card) 28'; Villalobos (yellow card) 43'; Hernández (yellow card) 90+3'	Report	Fuson 34' (Gebhard); Jepson (yellow card) 54'; Gebhard (yellow card) 74'	Stadium: CHI Memorial Stadium; Attendance: 1,619; Referee: DeShun Beard

August 7, 2021	Union Omaha	Postponed	Forward Madison FC	Papillion, Nebraska
7:00 PM CDT	Knutson 19' (Boyce); Boyce (yellow card) 56'		Jepson (yellow card) 42'	Stadium: Werner Park; Referee: Corbyn May
Note: Match abandoned in the 58th minute due to inclement weather in Omaha. Game replayed from the beginning on October 20th.

August 14, 2021 15	Forward Madison FC	2–1	South Georgia Tormenta FC	Madison, Wisconsin
7:00 PM CDT	Trimmingham 23' (Keegan); Fernandes (yellow card) 45+1'; Tobin (yellow card) 46'; Sukow 62' (Fernandes); Fuson (yellow card) 79'	Report	Gómez (yellow card) 45'; Somersall (yellow card) 45'; Micaletto 47' (pen.)	Stadium: Breese Stevens Field; Attendance: 3,049; Referee: Adorae Monroy

August 18, 2021 16	Forward Madison FC	2–2	Toronto FC II	Madison, Wisconsin
7:00 PM CDT	Molloy 11'; Pérez (yellow card) 43'; Gebhard 51' (Sukow)	Report	Altobelli 28' (Carlini), (yellow card) 45'; Petrasso (yellow card) 77'; Franklin 86' (Rothrock); Goulbourne (yellow card) 88'	Stadium: Breese Stevens Field; Attendance: 2,586; Referee: Nabil Bensalah

August 21, 2021 17	Forward Madison FC	1–1	North Texas SC	Madison, Wisconsin
7:00 PM CDT	Sierakowski 10' (Rad); Sukow (yellow card) 32'; Molloy (yellow card) 82'	Report	Gomes (yellow card) 32'; Smith (yellow card) 67'; Ramirez (yellow card) 85'; Hernandez (yellow card) 87'; Jacquel 90+1'; Almaguer (red card) 90+3'; Rayo (yellow card) 90+6'	Stadium: Breese Stevens Field; Attendance: 3,085; Referee: Danielle Chesky

August 25, 2021 18	North Carolina FC	1–0	Forward Madison FC	Cary, North Carolina
7:00 PM EDT	Martinez 8' (Miscic)	Report		Stadium: WakeMed Soccer Park; Attendance: 996; Referee: Abdou Ndiaye

September 1, 2021	Richmond Kickers	Postponed	Forward Madison FC	Richmond, Virginia
6:30 PM EDT				Stadium: City Stadium
Note: Match postponed to October 6th due to the anticipated impact of Hurricane Ida.

September 11, 2021 19	Forward Madison FC	1–0	Richmond Kickers	Madison, Wisconsin
7:00 PM CDT	Sierakowski 50' (Keegan); Leonard (yellow card) 66'; Gebhard (yellow card) 72'	Report	Calvo (yellow card) 26'; Vinyals (yellow card) 57'; Bolanos (yellow card) 80'	Stadium: Breese Stevens Field; Attendance: 2,744; Referee: Samantha Martinez

September 17, 2021 20	Toronto FC II	1–1	Forward Madison FC	Toronto, Ontario
4:00 PM EDT	McLaughlin (yellow card) 27'; Campbell (yellow card) 84'; Antonoglou 89'; Carlini (yellow card) 90+3'	Report	Sierakowski (yellow card) 38', Fuson (yellow card) 89'	Stadium: BMO Training Ground; Referee: Aubrey Kotelko

September 25, 2021 21	Forward Madison FC	1–1	Greenville Triumph SC	Madison, Wisconsin
7:00 PM CDT	Gebhard 21' (Keegan); Trimmingham (yellow card) 90+1'	Report	McLean 79', (yellow card) 90+6'; Hemmings (yellow card) 80'	Stadium: Breese Stevens Field; Referee: Nabil Bensalah

October 1, 2021 22	New England Revolution II	1–0	Forward Madison FC	Foxborough, Massachusetts
5:00 PM EDT	Quinones (yellow card) 27'; Kizza 58'	Report	Allen (yellow card) 61'; Molloy (yellow card) 64'	Stadium: Gillette Stadium; Referee: Thomas Snyder

October 6, 2021 23	Richmond Kickers	1–0	Forward Madison FC	Richmond, Virginia
6:30 PM EDT	Terzaghi 8' (Cole), (yellow card) 78'; Bolanos (yellow card) 73'	Report	Rad (yellow card) 80'	Stadium: City Stadium; Referee: William Steffen
Note: Rescheduled from the postponed September 1st match.

October 12, 2021 24	New England Revolution II	1–0	Forward Madison FC	Foxborough, Massachusetts
7:00 PM EDT	Rennicks; Rice (yellow card) 31'; Rozhansky (yellow card) 42'; Cayet (yellow card) 46'; O'Hearn (yellow card) 58'; Kizza (yellow card) 90'	Report	Gebhard (yellow card) 14'; Sukow (yellow card) 39'; Allen (yellow card) 77'	Stadium: Gillette Stadium; Attendance: 150; Referee: Luis Arroyo

October 16, 2021 25	Richmond Kickers	3–2	Forward Madison FC	Richmond, Virginia
6:30 PM EDT	Cole (yellow card) 5', (goal) 32' (Vinyals); Terzaghi 45', 88' (Anderson); Morán (yellow card) 45+4'; Monticelli (yellow card) 74'	Report	Trimmingham 8' (Leonard); Sukow (yellow card) 14'; Leonard (yellow card) 25'; Rad (yellow card) 42'; Tobin (yellow card) 44'; Calvo 47' (o.g.); Jepson (yellow card) 80'	Stadium: City Stadium; Attendance: 3,212; Referee: John Matto

October 20, 2021 26	Union Omaha	1–2	Forward Madison FC	Papillion, Nebraska
7:00 PM CDT	Conway (yellow card) 32'; Hurst 89' (pen.)	Report	Allen (yellow card) 32'; Trimmingham 53', 58', (yellow card) 58'; Rad (yellow card) 76'	Stadium: Werner Park; Referee: Abdou Ndiaye
Note: Makeup of the game abandoned on August 7th.

October 23, 2021 27	Forward Madison FC	2–2	FC Tucson	Madison, Wisconsin
7:00 PM CDT	Rad (yellow card) 42'; Molloy 50' (Jepson); Sierakowski 90+3' (Tobin)	Report	Dennis 16' (pen.); Rodriguez 24' (Dennis)	Stadium: Breese Stevens Field; Attendance: 3,200; Referee: Calin Radosav

October 30, 2021 28	Forward Madison FC	2–1	Chattanooga Red Wolves SC	Madison, Wisconsin
7:00 PM CDT	Barriga Toyama (yellow card) 28'; Enriquez 31'; Tobin (yellow card) 45'; Leonard (yellow card) 52'; Ricketts 65' (o.g.); Breno (yellow card) 69'; Molloy (yellow card) 80'	Report	Ricketts (yellow card) 47'; Ortiz 67' (Ruiz); Carrera García (yellow card) 74'	Stadium: Breese Stevens Field; Attendance: 2,273; Referee: Benjamin Meyer

== Statistics ==
As of October 30, 2021.

=== Appearances and goals ===
No.	Pos.	Nat.	Name	USL1 Season		
No.	Pos.	Nat.	Name	Apps	Starts	Goals
1	GK	(United States)	Phil Breno	27	27	0
2	DF	(United States)	Ronaldo Lomeli	5	3	0
3	MF	(United States)	Eric Leonard	23	19	0
4	DF	(United States)	Gustavo Fernandes	15	14	0
5	DF	(United States)	Cyrus Rad	12	12	0
6	MF	(Republic of Ireland)	Aaron Molloy	27	26	4
7	FW	(United States)	Jake Keegan	23	22	6
8	MF	(United States)	Michael Vang	10	3	0
9	FW	(United States)	Ryan Sierakowski	12	12	4
10	MF	(Spain)	Carlos Gómez	17	8	0
11	DF	(United States)	Heath Martin	0	0	0
13	DF	(United States)	Connor Tobin	28	28	2
14	MF	(United States)	Taner Dogan	0	0	0
17	FW	(United States)	Derek Gebhard	27	25	5
19	MF	(United States)	Justin Sukow	21	13	2
20	MF	(United States)	Audi Jepson	21	14	0
22	MF	(United States)	Christian Enriquez	15	13	1
23	DF	(United States)	Tyler Allen	23	15	0
24	GK	(United States)	Aidan Hogan	0	0	0
27	DF	(Mexico)	Christian Díaz	18	13	0
31	FW	(United States)	Noah Fuson	20	8	2
33	MF	(United States)	Jesus Perez	10	8	0
34	GK	(United States)	Chris Brady	1	1	0
37	MF	(United States)	Javier Casas Jr.	1	1	0
38	FW	(United States)	Alex Monis	1	0	0
44	DF	(Trinidad and Tobago)	Josiah Trimmingham	11	6	4
77	FW	(Panama)	Jiro Barriga Toyama	17	17	0

=== Goalscorers ===
Rank	Position	Name	USL1 Season
1	FW	(United States) Jake Keegan	6
2	FW	(United States) Derek Gebhard	5
3	MF	(Republic of Ireland) Aaron Molloy	4
3	FW	(United States) Ryan Sierakowski	4
3	DF	(Trinidad and Tobago) Josiah Trimmingham	4
6	FW	(United States) Noah Fuson	2
6	MF	(United States) Justin Sukow	2
6	DF	(United States) Connor Tobin	2
9	MF	(United States) Christian Enriquez	1
Own goal			2
Total			32

=== Assist scorers ===
Rank	Position	Name	USL1 Season
1	FW	(United States) Jake Keegan	4
2	MF	(United States) Audi Jepson	3
2	MF	(Republic of Ireland) Aaron Molloy	3
2	MF	(United States) Justin Sukow	3
5	FW	(Panama) Jiro Barriga Toyama	1
5	DF	(Mexico) Christian Díaz	1
5	DF	(United States) Gustavo Fernandes	1
5	FW	(United States) Derek Gebhard	1
5	MF	(United States) Eric Leonard	1
5	MF	(United States) Jesus Perez	1
5	DF	(United States) Cyrus Rad	1
5	DF	(United States) Connor Tobin	1
Total			21

=== Clean sheets ===
Rank	Name	USL1 Season
1	(United States) Phil Breno	4
2	(United States) Chris Brady	1
Total		5

=== Disciplinary record ===
Rank	Position	Name	USL1 Season		
Rank	Position	Name	Booked	(yellow card) (yellow-red card)	Sent off (straight red)
1	DF	(Panama) Jiro Barriga Toyama	7	0	0
1	MF	(United States) Derek Gebhard	7	0	0
3	DF	(United States) Gustavo Fernandes	6	0	0
3	FW	(Republic of Ireland) Aaron Molloy	6	0	0
5	FW	(United States) Noah Fuson	5	0	0
5	DF	(United States) Connor Tobin	5	0	0
7	MF	(United States) Eric Leonard	4	0	0
7	DF	(United States) Cyrus Rad	4	0	0
9	MF	(United States) Tyler Allen	3	0	0
9	DF	(Mexico) Christian Díaz	3	0	0
9	MF	(United States) Audi Jepson	3	0	0
9	MF	(United States) Justin Sukow	3	0	0
13	GK	(United States) Phil Breno	2	0	0
13	DF	(Trinidad and Tobago) Josiah Trimmingham	2	0	0
15	MF	(United States) Javier Casas Jr.	1	0	0
15	MF	(Spain) Carlos Gómez	1	0	0
15	FW	(United States) Jake Keegan	1	0	0
15	FW	(United States) Alex Monis	1	0	0
15	MF	(United States) Jesús Pérez	1	0	0
15	FW	(United States) Ryan Sierakowski	1	0	0
Total			66	0	0
