= 2020 Forward Madison FC season =

Forward Madison FC
2020 season
- Owner: Big Top Events
- Head coach: Daryl Shore
- Stadium: Hart Park
- USL League One: 7th
- USL1 Playoffs: Did not qualify
- U.S. Open Cup: Cancelled
- Top goalscorer: Michael Vang (4)
- Highest home attendance: 540 (August 14 vs. South Georgia Tormenta FC, August 23 vs. Orlando City B)
- Lowest home attendance: 409 (October 3 vs. FC Tucson)
- Average home league attendance: 504
- Biggest win: 4 goals: MAD 4–0 TRM (August 14); NE 0–4 MAD (September 4)
- Biggest defeat: 2 goals: GVL 2–0 MAD (September 13)
Home colors	Away colors	Third colors

The 2020 Forward Madison FC season was the second season in the soccer team's history, where they compete in the third division of American soccer, USL League One, the second season of that competition. Due to the COVID-19 pandemic, Forward Madison FC play their home games in 2020 at Hart Park, located in Wauwatosa, Wisconsin, United States.

== Club ==
=== Roster ===
As of September 2, 2020.

No.	Pos.	Nat.	Name	Date of birth (age)	Since
1	GK	(Austria)	Philipp Marceta	January 5, 1993 (age 33)	2020
3	MF	(United States)	Eric Leonard	October 5, 1995 (age 31)	2018
4	DF	(United States)	Gustavo Fernandes	February 19, 1998 (age 28)	2020
5	MF	(Chile)	Adolfo Ovalle	April 28, 1997 (age 29)	2020
6	MF	(United States)	Brandon Eaton	October 31, 1994 (age 31)	2019
7	FW	(Jamaica)	Don Smart	December 2, 1987 (age 38)	2018
8	MF	(United States)	Michael Vang	May 13, 2000 (age 26)	2020
9	FW	(United States)	Wojciech Wojcik	May 31, 1992 (age 34)	2020
10	MF	(United States)	J. C. Banks	August 24, 1989 (age 37)	2018
11	FW	(Brazil)	Paulo Jr.	January 23, 1989 (age 37)	2018
13	DF	(United States)	Connor Tobin (captain)	February 11, 1987 (age 39)	2019
14	FW	(United States)	Jamael Cox	April 27, 1992 (age 34)	2019
15	DF	(United States)	Jalen Crisler	August 29, 1994 (age 32)	2020
17	DF	(United States)	Eli Lockaby	December 18, 1995 (age 30)	2020
19	MF	(Tanzania)	Vital Nizigiyimana	January 1, 1997 (age 29)	2019
21	MF	(United States)	Louis Bennett II	May 19, 1995 (age 31)	2019
23	DF	(United States)	Carl Schneider	November 19, 1992 (age 33)	2019
27	DF	(Mexico)	Christian Díaz	April 7, 1991 (age 35)	2019
31	FW	(United States)	Noah Fuson	December 31, 1999 (age 26)	2020
33	GK	(United States)	Brandon Barnes	November 16, 1994 (age 31)	2019
34	GK	(United States)	Chris Brady	March 3, 2004 (age 22)	2020
38	FW	(Philippines)	Alex Monis	March 20, 2003 (age 23)	2020
39	MF	(United States)	Allan Rodríguez	May 27, 2004 (age 22)	2020
44	DF	(Trinidad and Tobago)	Josiah Trimmingham	December 14, 1996 (age 29)	2020
77	FW	(Panama)	Jiro Barriga Toyama	April 28, 1995 (age 31)	2019

=== Coaching staff ===
Name	Position
(United States) Daryl Shore	Head coach and technical director
(United States) Neil Hlavaty	Assistant coach
(United States) Jim Launder	Assistant coach

=== Front Office Staff ===
Name	Position
(United States) Conor Caloia	Chief operating officer
(United States) Vern Stenman	President

== Transfers ==
=== Transfers In ===
Date from	Position	Player	Last team	Type	Ref.
December 21, 2019	FW	(United States) Jamael Cox	FC Tucson	Free transfer	
January 14, 2020	FW	(United States) Wojciech Wojcik	Hartford Athletic	Free transfer	
January 16, 2020	MF	(United States) Michael Vang	(Portugal) S.U. 1º de Dezembro	Free transfer	
January 21, 2020	DF	(United States) Jalen Crisler	Detroit City FC	Free transfer	
January 24, 2020	GK	(United States) Brandon Barnes	Charlotte Independence	End of loan	
February 4, 2020	DF	(United States) Eli Lockaby	Richmond Kickers	Free transfer	
February 7, 2020	MF	(United States) Louis Bennett II	Memphis 901 FC	Free transfer	
February 13, 2020	DF	(Trinidad and Tobago) Josiah Trimmingham	FC Miami City	Free transfer	
March 12, 2020	DF	(United States) Gustavo Fernandes	Ocean City Nor'easters	Free transfer	
March 23, 2020	GK	(Austria) Philipp Marceta	(Germany) SV Heimstetten	Free transfer	
July 24, 2020	GK	(United States) Chris Brady	Chicago Fire FC	Loan	
July 24, 2020	FW	(Philippines) Alex Monis	Chicago Fire FC	Loan	
July 24, 2020	MF	(United States) Allan Rodríguez	Chicago Fire FC	Loan	
August 17, 2020	MF	(United States) Noah Fuson	(England) i2i Soccer Academy	Free transfer	
September 2, 2020	MF	(Chile) Adolfo Ovalle	(Canada) Toronto FC II	Loan	

=== Transfers Out ===
Date from	Position	Player	To	Type	Ref.
November 30, 2019	DF	(Jamaica) Zaire Bartley		Released	
November 30, 2019	MF	(United States) Louis Bennett II	Memphis 901 FC	End of loan	
November 30, 2019	DF	(United States) Carter Manley	Minnesota United FC	End of loan	
November 30, 2019	DF	(United States) Wyatt Omsberg	Minnesota United FC	End of loan	
November 30, 2019	DF	(United States) Shaun Russell		Released	
November 30, 2019	GK	(Canada) Dayne St. Clair	Minnesota United FC	End of loan	
November 30, 2019	MF	(Ecuador) Danny Tenorio		Released	
November 30, 2019	FW	(United States) Oliver White	Memphis 901 FC	End of loan	
January 23, 2020	GK	(Haiti) Brian Sylvestre	Miami FC	Paid transfer ($20,000)	
January 24, 2020	MF	(Tanzania) Ally Hamis Ng'anzi	Loudoun United FC	Free transfer	
January 25, 2020	MF	(Panama) Josiel Núñez	(Panama) C.D. Universitario	End of loan	
February 3, 2020	FW	(United States) Brian Bement	Chattanooga FC	Free transfer	
March 24, 2020	GK	(Republic of Ireland) Ryan Coulter	Rio Grande Valley FC	Free transfer	

== Kits ==
- Shirt sponsor: Dairyland Insurance
- Sleeve sponsor: Just Coffee Cooperative
- Shirt manufacturer: Hummel

Home
Away
Alternate

== Competitions ==
=== Exhibitions ===
February 19, 2020 Preseason 1	Birmingham Legion FC	3–0	Forward Madison FC	Hoover, Alabama
1:00 PM CST	Bergmann 27'; Servania 40'; Hoffman 50'	Report		Stadium: Hoover Metropolitan Complex; Attendance: 0
Note: 70 minute closed door scrimmage

February 22, 2020 Preseason 2	Memphis 901 FC	3–1	Forward Madison FC	Birmingham, Alabama
4:00 PM CST	Allen 53'; Metzger 69', 84'	Report	Banks 89' (pen.)	Stadium: Preston Goldfarb Field

February 25, 2020 Preseason 3	Louisville City FC	4–0	Forward Madison FC	Louisville, Kentucky
3:00 PM EST	Lancaster 9', 11'; DelPiccolo 20'; Thiam 22'	1st Half Report; Final Report		Stadium: Thurman-Hutchins Park

February 29, 2020 Preseason 4	Saint Louis FC	2–1	Forward Madison FC	Fenton, Missouri
3:00 PM CST	Cicerone 81' (pen.), 90'	FMFC Report; STLFC Report	Paulo Jr. 6'	Stadium: West Community Stadium

March 14, 2020 Preseason 5	Forward Madison FC	Cancelled	Wisconsin–Parkside Rangers	Madison, Wisconsin
11:00 AM CDT				Stadium: Madison Area Technical College
Note: Match cancelled due to the COVID-19 pandemic

March 21, 2020 Preseason 6	Marquette Golden Eagles	Cancelled	Forward Madison FC	Milwaukee, Wisconsin
7:30 PM CDT				Stadium: Marquette Dome
Note: Match cancelled due to the COVID-19 pandemic

April 15, 2020 Midseason 1	Forward Madison FC	Cancelled	Wisconsin Badgers	Madison, Wisconsin
7:00 PM CDT				Stadium: Breese Stevens Field
Note: Match cancelled due to the COVID-19 pandemic

May 23, 2020 Midseason 2	Forward Madison FC (United States)	Cancelled	(Germany) FC Augsburg	Madison, Wisconsin
7:00 PM CDT				Stadium: Breese Stevens Field
Note: Match cancelled due to the COVID-19 pandemic

=== USL League One ===
==== Standings ====
Pos	Team	Pld	W	L	D	GF	GA	GD	Pts	PPG	Qualification
1	Greenville Triumph SC	16	11	3	2	24	11	+13	35	2.19	Final, 2021 U.S. Open Cup
2	Union Omaha	16	8	3	5	20	15	+5	29	1.81	Final
3	North Texas SC (Note: Professional teams that are owned by teams playing in a higher division are ineligible for the U.S. Open Cup.)	16	7	3	6	27	19	+8	27	1.69	
4	Richmond Kickers	16	8	6	2	22	22	0	26	1.63	
5	Chattanooga Red Wolves SC	15	6	5	4	21	17	+4	22	1.47	
6	FC Tucson	16	6	6	4	21	19	+2	22	1.38	
7	Forward Madison FC	16	5	5	6	20	14	+6	21	1.31	
8	Tormenta FC	16	5	7	4	19	22	−3	19	1.19	
9	New England Revolution II	16	5	8	3	19	26	−7	18	1.13	
10	Fort Lauderdale CF	16	4	9	3	19	28	−9	15	0.94	
11	Orlando City B	15	1	11	3	10	29	−19	6	0.40	

Source: 2020 USL League One standings
Rules for classification: 1) points; 2) total wins; 3) total goal differential; 4) total goals scored; 5) points earned against top four Conference finishers; 6) disciplinary points; 7) coin toss or drawing of lots

==== Results summary ====
Overall								Home						Away					
Pld	W	D	L	GF	GA	GD	Pts	W	D	L	GF	GA	GD	W	D	L	GF	GA	GD
16	5	6	5	20	14	+6	21	4	3	1	10	3	+7	1	3	4	10	11	−1

Source: USL League One

==== Results by round ====
Round	1	2	3	4	5	6	7	8	9	10	11	12	13	14	15	16
Stadium	A	H	A	H	A	H	A	A	A	H	H	H	A	A	H	H
Result	L	D	L	W	D	W	W	L	L	W	D	D	D	D	L	W
Position	9	9	11	7	6	4	4	5	5	5	5	6	7	8	9	7

Source: USL League One
A = Away; H = Home; W = Win; D = Draw; L = Loss

==== Match results ====
July 25, 2020 1	North Texas SC	2–1	Forward Madison FC	Arlington, Texas
8:00 PM CDT	Redzic 11' (Batista); Damus 59' (Che); Alisson (yellow card) 63'	Report	Wojcik 30' (Paulo Jr.); Bennett (yellow card) 78'	Stadium: Globe Life Park; Attendance: 652; Referee: Matthew Corrigan

July 31, 2020 2	Forward Madison FC	0–0	Greenville Triumph SC	Wauwatosa, Wisconsin
7:00 PM CDT		Report	Pilato (yellow card) 90+5'	Stadium: Hart Park; Attendance: 535; Referee: Calin Radosav

August 8, 2020 3	Richmond Kickers	1–0	Forward Madison FC	Richmond, Virginia
6:30 PM EDT	Terzaghi 9' (Antley)	Report	Trimmingham (yellow card) 16'; Wojcik (yellow card) 73'	Stadium: City Stadium; Attendance: 822; Referee: Matthew Franz

August 14, 2020 4	Forward Madison FC	4–0	South Georgia Tormenta FC	Wauwatosa, Wisconsin
7:00 PM CDT	Vang 8' (Paulo Jr.), (yellow card) 60'; Smart 23' (Banks); Wojcik 58' (Smart); Paulo Jr. 69' (Smart)	Report	Obinwa (yellow card) 86'	Stadium: Hart Park; Attendance: 540; Referee: Calin Radosav

August 19, 2020 5	Union Omaha	1–1	Forward Madison FC	Papillion, Nebraska
7:00 PM CDT	Contreras 28' (pen.); N'For (yellow card) 45+3'	Report	Leonard 8' (Vang); Trimmingham (yellow card) 31' (yellow-red card) 83'	Stadium: Werner Park; Attendance: 2,400; Referee: Karen Abt

August 23, 2020 6	Forward Madison FC	3–1	Orlando City B	Wauwatosa, Wisconsin
4:00 PM CDT	Leonard (yellow card) 6'; Lockaby 19' (Vang); Monticelli 55' (o.g.); Eaton 85' (Smart)	Report	Aguilera (yellow card) 22'; Lamb; Rodas (yellow card) 90+2'; Ozeri (yellow card) 90+4'	Stadium: Hart Park; Attendance: 540; Referee: Nabil Bensalah

September 4, 2020 7	New England Revolution II	0–4	Forward Madison FC	Foxborough, Massachusetts
7:00 PM EDT		Report	Vang 39'; Verfurth 61' (o.g.); Ovalle 88' (Paulo Jr.); Wojcik 90+1'	Stadium: Gillette Stadium; Referee: Kenneth Rojas

September 13, 2020 8	Greenville Triumph SC	2–0	Forward Madison FC	Greenville, South Carolina
3:00 PM EDT	McLean 25' (Mohamed); Mohamed (yellow card) 35'; Lee (yellow card) 45+2'; Keegan 81' (Walker)	Report	Ovalle (yellow card) 29'	Stadium: Legacy Early College Field; Attendance: 601; Referee: Joshua Escobar

September 23, 2020 9	FC Tucson	2–1	Forward Madison FC	Tucson, Arizona
7:30 PM MST	Elivelton 3' (Silva); Coan 55' (Liadi); Liadi (yellow card) 74'	Report	Paulo Jr. 40' (Trimmingham); Leonard (yellow card) 68'; Trimmingham (yellow card) 90+3'	Stadium: Kino North Stadium; Referee: Alan Martinez-Loyola

September 26, 2020 10	Forward Madison FC	1–0	Chattanooga Red Wolves SC	Wauwatosa, Wisconsin
1:00 PM CDT	Ovalle (yellow card) 23'; Vang 50'; Smart (yellow card) 63'; Toyama (yellow card) 64'; Fernandes (yellow card) 90+1'; Cox (yellow card) 90+6'	Report	Hurst (yellow card) 39'; Ramos (yellow card) 66'; R. Pineda (yellow card) 85'	Stadium: Hart Park; Attendance: 497; Referee: Rebeca Pagan

October 3, 2020 11	Forward Madison FC	0–0	FC Tucson	Wauwatosa, Wisconsin
7:00 PM CDT	Wojcik (yellow card) 9'; Toyama (yellow card) 65'	Report	Alarcón (yellow card) 26'; Liadi (yellow card) 35'; Virgen (yellow card) 45+3'; Dennis (yellow card) 66'; Pena (yellow card) 87'	Stadium: Hart Park; Attendance: 409; Referee: Lukasz Szpala

October 11, 2020 12	Forward Madison FC	0–0	Union Omaha	Wauwatosa, Wisconsin
4:00 PM CDT	Ovalle (yellow card) 2'; Leonard (yellow card) 71'; Lockaby (yellow card) 90+5'	Report	Knutson (yellow card) 5'; Boyce (yellow card) 31'	Stadium: Hart Park; Referee: Calin Radosav

October 14, 2020 13	Fort Lauderdale CF	2–2	Forward Madison FC	Fort Lauderdale, Florida
4:00 PM EDT	Nodarse (yellow card) 18'; Sosa (yellow card) 32', (goal) 38'; Rosales (yellow card) 56'; Reyes 67' (Azcona); Zuluaga (yellow card) 86'; Azcona (yellow card) 90+2'	Report	Paulo Jr. 73'; Díaz 85'; Tobin (red card) 90+5'	Stadium: DRV PNK Stadium; Referee: Johan Fredrik Roenning

October 17, 2020 14	Chattanooga Red Wolves SC	1–1	Forward Madison FC	East Ridge, Tennessee
5:00 PM EDT	Hurst 8' (pen.), (yellow card) 90+2'; Soto (yellow card) 19'; Ruiz (yellow card) 73'	Report	Vang 69' (Paulo Jr.); Ovalle (yellow card) 70'	Stadium: CHI Memorial Stadium; Referee: Sergii Demianchuk

October 21, 2020 15	Forward Madison FC	0–1	North Texas SC	Wauwatosa, Wisconsin
7:00 PM CDT	Ovalle (yellow card) 41'	Report	A. Rodríguez (yellow card) 30', (goal) 90+9' (pen.); Burgess (yellow card) 74'; Alisson (yellow card) 90'	Stadium: Hart Park; Referee: Youssef Elmessoussi
Note: Postponed from its original date of August 30, 2020 due to the shooting of Jacob Blake

October 24, 2020 16	Forward Madison FC	2–1	New England Revolution II	Wauwatosa, Wisconsin
7:00 PM CDT	Toyama (yellow card) 63', (goal) 83' (Trimmingham); Fuson 81' (Bennett); Banks (yellow card) 89'	Report	Rennicks 30' (Rivera); Spaulding (yellow card) 57'; Souza (yellow card) 90+5'	Stadium: Hart Park; Referee: Alex Hofstetter

=== U.S. Open Cup ===
As a USL League One club, Forward Madison was to enter the competition in the Second Round, which was to be played April 7–9. The tournament was cancelled due to the COVID-19 pandemic.

April 8, 2019 Second round	Forward Madison FC (Wisconsin)	Cancelled	(Illinois) Chicago FC United / (Minnesota) Minneapolis City SC	Madison, Wisconsin
7:00 PM CDT				Stadium: Breese Stevens Field
Note: Match cancelled due to the COVID-19 pandemic

== Statistics ==
=== Appearances and goals ===
No.	Pos.	Nat.	Name	USL1 Season		
No.	Pos.	Nat.	Name	Apps	Starts	Goals
1	GK	(Austria)	Philipp Marceta	8	8	0
3	MF	(United States)	Eric Leonard	16	13	1
4	DF	(United States)	Gustavo Fernandes	11	5	0
5	MF	(Chile)	Adolfo Ovalle	9	8	1
6	MF	(United States)	Brandon Eaton	5	1	1
7	FW	(Jamaica)	Don Smart	16	14	1
8	MF	(United States)	Michael Vang	13	11	4
9	FW	(United States)	Wojciech Wojcik	16	14	3
10	MF	(United States)	J. C. Banks	15	13	0
11	FW	(Brazil)	Paulo Jr.	16	15	3
13	DF	(United States)	Connor Tobin	14	14	0
14	FW	(United States)	Jamael Cox	14	2	0
15	DF	(United States)	Jalen Crisler	2	1	0
17	DF	(United States)	Eli Lockaby	15	4	1
19	MF	(Tanzania)	Vital Nizigiyimana	0	0	0
21	MF	(United States)	Louis Bennett II	7	1	0
23	DF	(United States)	Carl Schneider	1	0	0
27	DF	(Mexico)	Christian Díaz	15	13	1
31	FW	(United States)	Noah Fuson	12	2	1
33	GK	(United States)	Brandon Barnes	0	0	0
34	GK	(United States)	Chris Brady	8	8	0
38	FW	(Philippines)	Alex Monis	6	1	0
39	MF	(United States)	Allan Rodríguez	2	1	0
44	DF	(Trinidad and Tobago)	Josiah Trimmingham	13	13	0
77	FW	(Panama)	Jiro Barriga Toyama	16	14	1

=== Goalscorers ===
Rank	Position	Name	USL1 Season
1	MF	(United States) Michael Vang	4
2	FW	(Brazil) Paulo Jr.	3
2	FW	(United States) Wojciech Wojcik	3
4	DF	(Panama) Jiro Barriga Toyama	1
4	DF	(Mexico) Christian Díaz	1
4	MF	(United States) Brandon Eaton	1
4	FW	(United States) Noah Fuson	1
4	MF	(United States) Eric Leonard	1
4	DF	(United States) Eli Lockaby	1
4	MF	(Chile) Adolfo Ovalle	1
4	FW	(Jamaica) Don Smart	1
Own goal			2
Total			20

=== Assist scorers ===
Rank	Position	Name	USL1 Season
1	FW	(Brazil) Paulo Jr.	4
2	FW	(Jamaica) Don Smart	3
3	DF	(Trinidad and Tobago) Josiah Trimmingham	2
3	MF	(United States) Michael Vang	2
5	MF	(United States) J. C. Banks	1
5	MF	(United States) Louis Bennett II	1
Total			13

=== Clean sheets ===
Rank	Name	USL1 Season
1	(United States) Chris Brady	3
1	(Austria) Philipp Marceta	3
Total		6

=== Disciplinary record ===
Rank	Position	Name	USL1 Season		
Rank	Position	Name	Booked	(yellow card) (yellow-red card)	Sent off (straight red)
1	MF	(Chile) Adolfo Ovalle	5	0	0
2	DF	(Trinidad and Tobago) Josiah Trimmingham	3	1	0
3	FW	(Panama) Jiro Barriga Toyama	3	0	0
3	MF	(United States) Eric Leonard	3	0	0
5	DF	(United States) Connor Tobin	0	0	1
5	FW	(United States) Wojciech Wojcik	2	0	0
7	MF	(United States) J. C. Banks	1	0	0
7	MF	(United States) Louis Bennett II	1	0	0
7	FW	(United States) Jamael Cox	1	0	0
7	DF	(United States) Gustavo Fernandes	1	0	0
7	DF	(United States) Eli Lockaby	1	0	0
7	FW	(Jamaica) Don Smart	1	0	0
7	MF	(United States) Michael Vang	1	0	0
Total			23	1	1
