= 2020 North Texas SC season =

North Texas SC
2020 season
- Head coach: Eric Quill
- Stadium: Globe Life Park; Arlington, Texas (Capacity: 48,114)
- USL League One: 3rd
- USL League One Playoffs: Did not qualify
- Highest home attendance: 1,137 vs. CHA (Aug. 8)
- Lowest home attendance: 615 vs. MAD (July 25)
- Average home league attendance: 885
- Biggest win: NTX 3–0 FTL (Oct. 3)
- Biggest defeat: OMA 1–0 NTX (Aug. 1); FTL 3–2 NTX (Aug. 19); GVL 1–0 NTX (Sept. 25)
Home colours	Away colours

The 2020 North Texas SC season was the second season in the soccer team's history, where they competed in the third division of American soccer, USL League One. North Texas SC, as a child club of FC Dallas of Major League Soccer, were barred from participating in the 2020 U.S. Open Cup. North Texas SC played their first two home games at Toyota Stadium in Frisco, Texas, United States, and their remaining home games at Globe Life Park in Arlington, Texas.

== Club ==
=== Roster ===
As of July 27, 2020.

No.	Position	Nation	Player
3	DF	TPE	Philip Ponder
4	DF	USA	Brecc Evans
6	MF	USA	Imanol Almaguer
7	MF	USA	Oscar Romero
8	MF	USA	David Rodriguez
9	FW	USA	Ricardo Pepi
11	FW	HAI	Ronaldo Damus
12	DF	BRA	Pedrinho
14	FW	USA	Gibran Rayo
17	DF	MEX	Juan Álvarez (on loan from Monterrey)
18	MF	USA	Derek Waldeck
20	DF	USA	Grady Easton
21	FW	USA	Collin Smith
22	DF	USA	Lamar Batista
23	MF	USA	Thomas Roberts
24	GK	USA	Luis Zamudio
26	DF	USA	Edwin Munjoma
27	MF	BRA	Alisson
28	FW	ENG	Alex Bruce
29	DF	USA	Nkosi Burgess
36	MF	USA	Diego Hernandez
37	FW	BIH	Beni Redzic
44	DF	USA	Eduardo Ruiz
46	DF	USA	Justin Che
65	MF	USA	Philip Akem

Signed to first team contract with FC Dallas.
FC Dallas Academy player.

=== Coaching staff ===
As of February 27, 2020.

Name	Position
(United States) Eric Quill	Head coach
(Argentina) Alex Aldaz	Assistant coach
(Brazil) Michel	Assistant coach
(Argentina) Néstor Merlo	Goalkeeping coach

=== Front Office Staff ===
Name	Position
(England) Matt Denny	General manager

== Competitions ==
=== Exhibitions ===
February 22, 2020 Preseason 1	North Texas SC	1–0	El Paso Locomotive FC	Frisco, Texas
1:00 PM CDT	Fazio (2nd half)	Report		Stadium: Toyota Soccer Center

February 25, 2020 Preseason 2	North Texas SC	1–3	FC Tulsa	Frisco, Texas
2:00 PM CDT	Sealy 16'	NTSC Report; TUL Report	Boakye 23'; Marlon 34'; Udoh 73'	Stadium: Toyota Soccer Center

February 27, 2020 Preseason 3	North Texas SC	1–0	Sporting Kansas City II	Frisco, Texas
2:00 PM CDT	Sealy 11' (pen.)	NTSC Report; SKC II Report		Stadium: Toyota Soccer Center
Note: Teams played a 30 minute period after regulation ended; Sporting Kansas City II's Fredinho Mompremier scored in the 121st minute

=== USL League One ===
==== Standings ====
Pos	Team	Pld	W	L	D	GF	GA	GD	Pts	PPG	Qualification
1	Greenville Triumph SC	16	11	3	2	24	11	+13	35	2.19	Final, 2021 U.S. Open Cup
2	Union Omaha	16	8	3	5	20	15	+5	29	1.81	Final
3	North Texas SC (Note: Professional teams that are owned by teams playing in a higher division are ineligible for the U.S. Open Cup.)	16	7	3	6	27	19	+8	27	1.69	
4	Richmond Kickers	16	8	6	2	22	22	0	26	1.63	
5	Chattanooga Red Wolves SC	15	6	5	4	21	17	+4	22	1.47	

Source: 2020 USL League One standings
Rules for classification: 1) points; 2) total wins; 3) total goal differential; 4) total goals scored; 5) points earned against top four Conference finishers; 6) disciplinary points; 7) coin toss or drawing of lots

==== Results summary ====
Overall								Home						Away					
Pld	W	D	L	GF	GA	GD	Pts	W	D	L	GF	GA	GD	W	D	L	GF	GA	GD
6	1	3	2	11	12	−1	6	1	3	0	9	8	+1	0	0	2	2	4	−2

Source: USL League One

==== Results by round ====
Round	1	2	3	4	5	6	7	8	9	10	11	12	13	14	15	16	17	18	19	20	21	22	23	24	25	26	27	28
Stadium	A	H	A	H	A	H	H	H	A	H	A	H	H	A	H	A	A	H	A	A	H	H	A	A	A	H	A	H
Result	W	L	D	D	L	D																						
Position	2	4	5	5	8																							

Source: USL League One
A = Away; H = Home; W = Win; D = Draw; L = Loss

==== Match results ====
July 25, 2020 1	North Texas SC	2–1	Forward Madison FC	Arlington, Texas
8:00 PM CDT	Redžić 11'; Damus 59'; Alisson (yellow card) 63'	Report	Wojcik 30'; Bennett (yellow card) 78'	Stadium: Globe Life Park; Attendance: 652; Referee: Matthew Corrigan

August 1, 2020 2	Union Omaha	1–0	North Texas SC	Papillion, Nebraska
7:00 PM CDT	Nuhu (yellow card) 38'; Conway 74'	Report	Álvarez (yellow card) 11'	Stadium: Werner Park; Attendance: 2,400; Referee: Lukasz Szpala

August 8, 2020 3	North Texas SC	2–2	Chattanooga Red Wolves SC	Frisco, Texas
8:00 PM CDT	Redžić 47', 87'; Rayo (yellow card) 68' (yellow-red card) 90+3'	Report	Hurst 3'; R. Pineda (yellow card) 76'; Hernández 88', (yellow card) 90+5'	Stadium: Toyota Stadium; Attendance: 1,137; Referee: Héctor Hernández

August 15, 2020 4	North Texas SC	3–3	New England Revolution II	Arlington, Texas
8:00 PM CDT	Roberts 4'; Damus 27'; Bruce 90+2'	Report	Firmino 16'; Quinones (yellow card) 22'; Angking 58', 79'; Bell (yellow card) 81'	Stadium: Globe Life Park; Attendance: 952; Referee: Gloria Resendiz

August 19, 2020 5	Fort Lauderdale CF	3–2	North Texas SC	Fort Lauderdale, Florida
7:00 PM CDT	Carrasco (yellow card) 14'; Lopez-Espin 28', 36'; Valencia 56'; Hardin (yellow card) 62'; Reyes (yellow card) 86'; Castanheira (yellow card) 89'	Report	Alisson (yellow card) 25', (goal) 75'; Romero 39' (pen.), (yellow card) 90+5'	Stadium: Inter Miami CF Stadium; Referee: Alex Billeter

August 23, 2020 6	North Texas SC	2–2	Union Omaha	Arlington, Texas
8:00 PM CDT	Cerrillo 2'; Damus (red card) 51'; Romero (yellow card) 56'; Che (yellow card) 71'; Alisson (yellow card) 73'; Rayo 79'; Roberts (yellow card) 90+4'	Report	Scearce (yellow card) 21', (goal) 75'; Vanacore-Decker (yellow card) 23', (goal) 84'; Sousa (yellow card) 24'; Nuhu (red card) 51'	Stadium: Globe Life Park; Attendance: 855; Referee: Brandon Gardner

August 30, 2020 7	Forward Madison FC	Postponed	North Texas SC	Madison, Wisconsin
4:00 PM CDT				Stadium: Breese Stevens Field
Note: Postponed due to the shooting of Jacob Blake

September 3, 2020 8	Orlando City B	1–1	North Texas SC	Kissimmee, Florida
6:00 PM CDT	Monticelli (yellow card) 22'; Quintero 30'; Carabalí (yellow card) 60'; Rodas (yellow card) 77'; Ndje (yellow card) 81'	Report	Romero 24' (pen.); Che (yellow card) 49'; Rayo (yellow card) 70'	Stadium: Osceola County Stadium; Referee: Natalie Simon

September 12, 2020 9	FC Tucson	0–2	North Texas SC	Tucson, Arizona
9:30 PM CDT	Alarcón (yellow card) 3'; Ramos-Godoy (yellow card) 59'; Liadi (yellow card) 70'; Lewis (yellow card) 83'; Ferriol (yellow card) 84'	Report	Damus 61' (pen.); Smith 69'	Stadium: Kino North Stadium; Referee: Laura Rodriguez

September 19, 2020 10	North Texas SC	1–1	FC Tucson	Arlington, Texas
8:00 PM CDT	Cerrillo (red card) 21'; Do. Hernandez 71'; Bruce (yellow card) 90+5'	Report	Dennis (yellow card) 21'; Elivelton 45+5'	Stadium: Globe Life Park; Attendance: 926; Referee: Gloria Resendiz

September 25, 2020 11	Greenville Triumph SC	1–0	North Texas SC	Greenville, South Carolina
6:00 PM EDT	Polak (yellow card) 16'; Donnelly (yellow card) 56'; Keegan 86'	Report		Stadium: Legacy Early College Field; Attendance: 903; Referee: William Steffen

October 3, 2020 12	North Texas SC	3–0	Fort Lauderdale CF	Arlington, Texas
5:30 PM CDT	Rayo (yellow card) 53'; Damus 57', 89'; A. Rodríguez 80'	Report	Young (yellow card) 83'; Lopez-Espin (yellow card) 87'	Stadium: Globe Life Park; Attendance: 889; Referee: Héctor Hernández

October 7, 2020 13	Chattanooga Red Wolves SC	1–3	North Texas SC	East Ridge, Tennessee
7:00 PM CDT	Hurst 22' (pen.); Nicklaw (yellow card) 57'; Doyle (yellow card) 74'	Report	Munjoma (yellow card) 13'; A. Rodríguez 26'; Burgess 48'; Bruce 57' (pen.)	Stadium: Chattanooga Red Wolves Stadium; Referee: Sergii Demianchuk

October 10, 2020 14	North Texas SC	2–1	Richmond Kickers	Arlington, Texas
7:30 PM CDT	Bruce 23'; Munjoma 45+3'; Rayo (yellow card) 43'; Alisson (yellow card) 81'	Report	Terzaghi 60'; Magalhães (yellow card) 63'; Ackwei (yellow card) 90+3'	Stadium: Globe Life Park; Attendance: 810; Referee: Gerald Flores

October 16, 2020 15	New England Revolution II	1–1	North Texas SC	Foxborough, Massachusetts
6:00 PM EDT	Rivera 9'	Report	Do. Hernandez (yellow card) 30', (goal) 49'	Stadium: Gillette Stadium; Referee: Adam Kilpatrick

October 21, 2020 7	Forward Madison FC	0–1	North Texas SC	Wauwatosa, Wisconsin
7:00 PM CDT	Ovalle (yellow card) 41'	Report	A. Rodríguez (yellow card) 30', (goal) 90+9' (pen.); Burgess (yellow card) 74'; Alisson (yellow card) 90'	Stadium: Hart Park; Referee: Youssef Elmessoussi
Note: Re-schedule of postponed August 30 match.

October 24, 2020 16	North Texas SC	2–1	South Georgia Tormenta FC	Arlington, Texas
7:30 PM CDT	Do. Hernandez 47'; Burgess (yellow card) 90+5'; Munjoma 90+6', (yellow card) 90+8'	Report	Vinyals 45+3'; Micaletto (yellow card) 90'	Stadium: Globe Life Park; Attendance: 898; Referee: Matthew Corrigan
