= Merlot (disambiguation) =

Merlot is a wine or wine grape.

Merlot or MERLOT may also refer to:

- Merlot blanc, a separate grape variety
- Merlot, an open-source project on which the Xerlin open source XML editor is based
- MERLOT (Multimedia Educational Resource for Learning and Online Teaching), a program of the California State University in partnership with higher education institutions, professional societies, and industry

== See also ==
- Merlaut, a commune in the Marne department in north-eastern France
- Merlo (disambiguation)
