= Marčeta =

Marčeta (Serbian: Марчета) is a surname. Notable people with the surname include:

- Damjan Marčeta (born 1994), Serbian footballer
- Danijel Marčeta (born 1989), Slovenian footballer
- Philipp Marceta (born 1993), Austrian footballer
