= 2020 Chicago Fire FC season =

Chicago Fire FC
2020 season
- Chairman: Joe Mansueto
- Head coach: Raphaël Wicky
- Stadium: Soldier Field (capacity: 61,500)
- MLS: Conference: 11th Overall: 22nd
- MLS Cup Playoffs: Did not qualify
- U.S. Open Cup: Canceled
- MLS is Back Tournament: Group stage
- Highest home attendance: League:
- Lowest home attendance: League:
- Average home league attendance: League:
- Biggest win: CHI 4–0 HOU (September 23)
- Biggest defeat: CLB 3–0 CHI (August 20); ORL 4–1 CHI (August 20)
Home colors	Away colors

The 2020 Chicago Fire FC season was the club's 22nd year of existence, as well as their 23rd in Major League Soccer. This was the Fire's first full year under the ownership of Joe Mansueto following his purchase of the club on September 13, 2019. This was also the Fire's first season back in city limits, playing in Soldier Field for the first time since 2005. The Fire faced Atlanta United FC in their first home match. The team also announced a rebrand on November 21, 2019. They became known as Chicago Fire Football Club (Chicago Fire FC) and changed their logo. The change was met with large amounts of negative reaction on social media. The Fire failed to advance out of the group stage of the MLS is Back Tournament. After finishing 11th in the Eastern Conference, the team did not qualify for the MLS Cup Playoffs.

== Current squad ==
As of March 6, 2020. Sources: Chicago Fire official roster and Official MLS Roster

No.	Name	Nationality	Position	Date of birth (age)	Previous club	Player Notes
1	Bobby Shuttleworth	(United States)	G	May 17, 1987 (age 39)	(United States) Sacramento Republic	
2	Boris Sekulić	(Slovakia)	D	October 21, 1991 (age 34)	(Poland) Górnik Zabrze	International
3	Jonathan Bornstein	(United States)	D	November 7, 1984 (age 41)	(Israel) Maccabi Netanya F.C.	
4	Johan Kappelhof	(Netherlands)	D	August 5, 1990 (age 35)	(Netherlands) FC Groningen	
5	Francisco Calvo	(Costa Rica)	D	July 8, 1992 (age 33)	(United States) Minnesota United FC	
6	Miguel Navarro	(Venezuela)	D	February 26, 1999 (age 27)	(Venezuela) Deportivo La Guaira F.C.	International
7	Ignacio Aliseda	(Argentina)	M	March 14, 2000 (age 26)	(Argentina) Defensa y Justicia	International; Designated Player
8	Luka Stojanović	(Serbia)	M	January 4, 1994 (age 32)}	(Serbia) FK Čukarički	International
9	C. J. Sapong	(United States)	F	December 27, 1988 (age 37)	(United States) Philadelphia Union	
10	Álvaro Medrán	(Spain)	M	March 15, 1994 (age 32)	(Spain) Valencia CF	International
11	Przemysław Frankowski	(Poland)	M	April 12, 1995 (age 31)	(Poland) Jagiellonia Białystok	International
13	Brandt Bronico	(United States)	M	June 20, 1995 (age 30)	(United States) Charlotte 49ers	
14	Djordje Mihailovic	(United States)	M	November 10, 1998 (age 27)	(United States) Chicago Fire Academy	Homegrown
16	Michael Azira	(Uganda)	M	August 22, 1987 (age 38)	(Canada) Montreal Impact	
18	Kenneth Kronholm	(United States)	G	October 14, 1985 (age 40)	(Germany) Holstein Kiel	
20	Wyatt Omsberg	(United States)	D	September 21, 1995 (age 30)	(United States) Minnesota United FC	
21	Fabian Herbers	(Germany)	F	August 17, 1993 (age 32)	(United States) Philadelphia Union	
22	Mauricio Pineda	(United States)	D/M	October 17, 1997 (age 28)	(United States) North Carolina Tar Heels	Homegrown
24	Connor Sparrow	(United States)	G	May 10, 1994 (age 32)	(United States) Nashville SC	
25	Nicholas Slonina	(United States)	D	March 20, 2001 (age 25)	(United States) Chicago Fire Academy	Homegrown
27	Robert Berić	(Slovenia)	F	June 17, 1991 (age 34)	(France) AS Saint-Étienne	International; Designated Player
28	Elliot Collier	(New Zealand)	F	February 22, 1995 (age 31)	(United States) Loyola Chicago	
30	Gastón Giménez	(Argentina)	M	July 27, 1991 (age 34)	(Argentina) Vélez Sarsfield	International; Designated Player
32	Gabriel Slonina	(United States)	G	May 15, 2004 (age 22)	(United States) Chicago Fire Academy	Homegrown
33	Jeremiah Gutjahr	(United States)	M	August 10, 1997 (age 28)	(United States) Indiana Hoosiers	Homegrown
36	Andre Reynolds II	(United States)	D	May 2, 2001 (age 25)	(United States) Chicago Fire Academy	Homegrown
—	Chris Brady	(United States)	G	March 3, 2004 (age 22)	(United States) Chicago Fire Academy	Homegrown
—	Javier Casas	(United States)	M	May 14, 2003 (age 23)	(United States) Chicago Fire Academy	Homegrown
—	Brian Gutiérrez	(United States)	M	June 17, 2003 (age 22)	(United States) Chicago Fire Academy	Homegrown
—	Alex Monis	(United States)	F	March 20, 2003 (age 23)	(United States) Chicago Fire Academy	Homegrown
—	Allan Rodríguez	(United States)	M	May 7, 2004 (age 22)	(United States) Chicago Fire Academy	Homegrown

== Player movement ==
=== In ===
Date	Player	Position	Previous club	Notes	Ref
October 10, 2019	(Spain) Álvaro Medrán	M	(Spain) Valencia CF	Signed a TAM contract as a free agent through 2021 with options for 2022 and 2023	
October 14, 2019	(Uganda) Michael Azira	M	(United States) Chicago Fire FC	Nelson announced that his option was exercised during a media roundtable	
October 14, 2019	(United States) Jeremiah Gutjahr	D/M	(United States) Chicago Fire FC	Nelson announced that his option was exercised during a media roundtable	
October 14, 2019	(Germany) Fabian Herbers	M/F	(United States) Chicago Fire FC	Nelson announced that his option was exercised during a media roundtable	
November 21, 2019	(Canada) Raheem Edwards	D/M	(United States) Chicago Fire FC	Option was exercised	
November 21, 2019	(United States) C. J. Sapong	M/F	(United States) Chicago Fire FC	Option was exercised	
December 20, 2019	(United States) Nicholas Slonina	D	(United States) Chicago Fire Academy	Signed as a homegrown player for the 2020 season with options through 2023	
January 17, 2020	(United States) Mauricio Pineda	D/M	(United States) North Carolina Tar Heels	Signed as a homegrown player for the 2020 season with options through 2023	
January 18, 2020	(Slovenia) Robert Berić	F	(France) AS Saint-Étienne	Signed to a designated player contract through 2021 with an option for 2022	
January 20, 2020	(United States) Connor Sparrow	GK	(United States) Nashville SC	Signed for 2020 with options for 2021 and 2022	
January 27, 2020	(Venezuela) Miguel Navarro	D	(Venezuela) Deportivo La Guaira F.C.	Transferred from Deportivo La Guaira F.C. for an undisclosed amount on a contract through 2022 with options for 2023 and 2024	
January 30, 2020	(United States) Bobby Shuttleworth	GK	(United States) Sacramento Republic	Signed as a free agent to a contract through 2021	
February 6, 2020	(New Zealand) Elliot Collier	F	(United States) Chicago Fire FC	Signed after his contract was declined and after a successful trial	
February 11, 2020	(United States) Wyatt Omsberg	D	(United States) Minnesota United FC	Acquired from Minnesota in exchange for Raheem Edwards	
February 15, 2020	(Slovakia) Boris Sekulić	D	(Poland) Górnik Zabrze	Acquired from Górnik Zabrze on a contract through 2022	
February 19, 2020	(Argentina) Ignacio Aliseda	M	(Argentina) Defensa y Justicia	Acquired from Defensa y Justicia as a Designated Player on a contract through 2023	
February 20, 2020	(Serbia) Luka Stojanović	M	(Serbia) FK Čukarički	Acquired from FK Čukarički on a contract through 2021 with an option for 2022	
February 24, 2020	(Argentina) Gastón Giménez	M	(Argentina) Vélez Sarsfield	Acquired from Velez Sarsfield as a Designated Player on a contract through 2021 with an option for 2022	
March 9, 2020	(United States) Brian Gutiérrez	M	(United States) Chicago Fire Academy	Signed as a homegrown player through the 2023 season with an option for 2024	
March 10, 2020	(United States) Javier Casas	M	(United States) Chicago Fire Academy	Signed as a homegrown player through the 2023 season with an option for 2024	
March 11, 2020	(United States) Alex Monis	F	(United States) Chicago Fire Academy	Signed as a homegrown player through the 2023 season with an option for 2024	
March 24, 2020	(United States) Chris Brady	G	(United States) Chicago Fire Academy	Signed as a homegrown player through the 2023 season with an option for 2024	
March 25, 2020	(United States) Allan Rodríguez	M	(United States) Chicago Fire Academy	Signed as a homegrown player through the 2023 season with an option for 2024	

=== Out ===
Date	Player	Position	Destination Club	Notes	Ref
October 8, 2019	(Germany) Bastian Schweinsteiger	D/M	Retired		
October 12, 2019	(Hungary) Nemanja Nikolić	F	(Hungary) Fehérvár FC	Out of contract	
November 12, 2019	(United States) Dax McCarty	M	(United States) Nashville SC	Traded in exchange for $50k in TAM and $50k in GAM	
November 14, 2019	(United States) Grant Lillard	D	(United States) Inter Miami CF	Traded in exchange for $75k in GAM	
November 21, 2019	(Costa Rica) Diego Campos	M	(Norway) FK Jerv	Option declined	
November 21, 2019	(United States) Stefan Cleveland	GK	(United States) Seattle Sounders FC	Option declined; rights traded to Seattle alongside Chicago's 35th overall pick in the 2020 MLS SuperDraft in exchange for Seattle's 26th overall pick	
November 21, 2019	(Argentina) Nicolás Gaitán	M	(France) LOSC Lille	Option declined	
November 21, 2019	(Serbia) Aleksandar Katai	M/F	(United States) LA Galaxy	Option declined	
November 21, 2019	(Panama) Cristian Martínez	M	(Spain) Cádiz CF	Option declined	
November 21, 2019	(United States) Amando Moreno	M/F	(United States) New Mexico United	Option declined	
November 21, 2019	(Denmark) David Ousted	GK	(Sweden) Hammarby Fotboll	Option declined	
November 21, 2019	(Mexico) Richard Sánchez	GK	(United States) Sporting Kansas City	Option declined; picked up in Round 1 of the 2019 MLS Re-Entry Draft	
January 14, 2020	(Brazil) Marcelo	DF	(Portugal) F.C. Paços de Ferreira	Mutual Termination	
February 11, 2020	(Canada) Raheem Edwards	D/M	(United States) Minnesota United FC	Traded to Minnesota in exchange for Wyatt Omsberg	

=== Unsigned trialists and draftees ===
Date first reported	Player	Position	Previous club	Notes	Ref
January 9, 2020	(United States) Jonathan Jimenez	D/M	(United States) Pacific Tigers	Drafted with the 26th overall pick in the 2020 MLS SuperDraft	
January 27, 2020	(United States) Jonathan Campbell	D	(United States) Seattle Sounders FC	Announced as a trialist in Florida; confirmed to have left on February 16	
January 27, 2020	(Greece) Nikos Kenourgios	D/F	(Belgium) S.V. Zulte Waregem	Announced as a trialist in Florida; confirmed to have left on February 16	
January 27, 2020	(United States) Jesús Vázquez	D	(Mexico) Atlante F.C.	Announced as a trialist in Florida	
February 16, 2020	(Mexico) Christian Diaz	D	(United States) Forward Madison FC	Announced as a trialist on February 16	

The Fire also had several academy players in the camp- Chris Brady (G), Javier Casas (M), Brian Gutierrez (M), Alex Monis (F), and Allan Rodriguez (M).

== Technical staff ==
Position	Staff
General Manager	(United States) Nelson Rodríguez
Sporting Director	(Switzerland) Georg Heitz
Technical Director	(Germany) Sebastian Pelzer
Head Coach	(Switzerland) Raphaël Wicky
Assistant Coach	(United States) Frank Klopas
Assistant Coach	(Australia) David Zdrilic
Goalkeeping Coach	(United States) Adin Brown
Senior Director of Soccer Operations	Eddie Rock
Performance Coach	John Grace
Director of Performance	Ben Donachie
Strength and Conditioning Coach	Raphael Fevre
Massage Therapist	Steven Burrows
Director of Scouting	Matt Pearson
Video Analyst	Nenad Babic
Manager of Team and Soccer Operations	Alex Boler
Equipment Manager	Brian Sauer
Assistant Equipment Manager	Juan Arreola
Head Athletic Trainer	Reade Whitney
Assistant Athletic Trainer	Hillary Bell
Assistant Athletic Trainer	Tyler Golden
Chief Medical Officer	Dr. Joshua Blomgren, D.O.
Head Orthopedic Officer	Dr. Brian Forsythe, M.D.
Physical Therapist	Ryan Perry

Last updated: January 18, 2020
Source: Chicago Fire Technical Staff

== Standings ==
=== Eastern Conference table ===
Pos	Team	Pld	W	L	T	GF	GA	GD	Pts	PPG	Qualification
9	Montreal Impact (Note: Canadian clubs could not qualify for the 2021 CONCACAF Champions League through the MLS regular season or playoffs.)	23	8	13	2	33	43	−10	26	1.13	Qualification for the playoffs play-in round
10	Inter Miami CF	23	7	13	3	25	35	−10	24	1.04	Qualification for the playoffs play-in round
11	Chicago Fire FC	23	5	10	8	33	39	−6	23	1.00	
12	Atlanta United FC	23	6	13	4	23	30	−7	22	0.96	Qualification for the 2021 CONCACAF Champions League (Note: As 2019 U.S. Open Cup champions)
13	D.C. United	23	5	12	6	25	41	−16	21	0.91	

Source: MLS
Rules for classification: 1) points per game; 2) total wins per match played; 3) total goal differential per match played; 4) total goals scored per match played; 5) fewest disciplinary points per match played; 6) away goal differential per away match played; 7) away goals scored per away match played; 8) home goal differential per home match played; 9) home goals scored per home match played; 10) coin toss or drawing of lots.

=== Overall table ===
2020 MLS overall standings
Pos	Team	Pld	W	L	T	GF	GA	GD	Pts	PPG	Qualification
20	LA Galaxy	22	6	12	4	27	46	−19	22	1.00	
21	Real Salt Lake	22	5	10	7	25	35	−10	22	1.00	
22	Chicago Fire FC	23	5	10	8	33	39	−6	23	1.00	
23	Atlanta United FC (U)	23	6	13	4	23	30	−7	22	0.96	2021 CONCACAF Champions League (Note: As 2019 U.S. Open Cup champions (USA4))
24	D.C. United	23	5	12	6	25	41	−16	21	0.91	

Source: MLS
Rules for classification: 1) points per game; 2) total wins per match played; 3) total goal differential per match played; 4) total goals scored per match played; 5) fewest disciplinary points per match played; 6) away goal differential per away match played; 7) away goals scored per away match played; 8) home goal differential per home match played; 9) home goals scored per home match played; 10) coin toss or drawing of lots.
(U) U.S. Open Cup winners

==== MLS is Back – group stage ====
Group B results
Pos	Team	Pld	W	D	L	GF	GA	GD	Pts	Qualification
1	San Jose Earthquakes	3	2	1	0	6	3	+3	7	Advanced to knockout stage
2	Seattle Sounders FC	3	1	1	1	4	2	+2	4	Advanced to knockout stage
3	Vancouver Whitecaps FC	3	1	0	2	5	7	−2	3	Advanced to knockout stage
4	Chicago Fire	3	1	0	2	2	5	−3	3	

Source: MLS

== Match results ==
Win Tie Loss

=== Preseason ===
February 1, 2020	Chicago Fire	0–3	Philadelphia Union	Clearwater, Florida
17:00		Report; Report	Kacper Przybyłko; Anthony Fontana; Issa Rayyan	Stadium: Joe DiMaggio Sports Complex

February 6, 2020	Chicago Fire	3–1	Nashville SC	Tampa, Florida
17:00	C. J. Sapong; Elliot Collier; Robert Berić	Report; Report	Randall Leal	Stadium: Pepin Stadium

February 12, 2020	Orange County SC	0–2	Chicago Fire	Irvine, California
17:00		Report; Report	Elliot Collier 27'; C. J. Sapong 35'	Stadium: Orange County Great Park
Note: Played in three 30-minute periods.

February 15, 2020	Chicago Fire	2–4	Colorado Rapids	Carson, California
14:00	C.J. Sapong 9'; Elliot Collier 79'	Report	Younes Namli 22'; Sam Nicholson 53'; Kellyn Acosta 61'; Nicolás Mezquida 84'	Stadium: Dignity Health Sports Park; Referee: Lukasz Szpala

February 19, 2020	Chicago Fire	2–0	Toronto FC	Irvine, California
17:00	Nicholas Slonina 15'; Elliot Collier 31'	[ Report]		Stadium: University of California, Irvine

February 22, 2020	LA Galaxy	1–1	Chicago Fire	Carson, California
17:00	Sacha Kljestan	Report	Micheal Azira 84'	Stadium: Dignity Health Sports Park

=== Major League Soccer ===
Due to changes in the schedule, this will be the first season where the Fire don't face every club in the league (three clubs in the Western Conference). They did not compete against Real Salt Lake. Kickoff times are in CST (UTC-06)

March 1, 2020 1	Seattle Sounders FC	2–1	Chicago Fire	Seattle, Washington
14:00	Morris 62', 90+3'; Delem (yellow card) 80'; João Paulo (yellow card) 86'	Report	Berić 46'; Herbers (yellow card) 72'	Stadium: CenturyLink Field; Attendance: 40,126; Referee: Alex Chilowicz

March 7, 2020 2	New England Revolution	1–1	Chicago Fire	Foxborough, Massachusetts
12:30	Buksa 28'; Kessler (yellow card) 40'; Jones (yellow card) 90+1'	Report	Kappelhof (yellow card) 47'; Bornstein 70'	Stadium: Gillette Stadium; Attendance: 15,289; Referee: Fotis Bazakos

August 20, 2020 3	Columbus Crew SC	3–0	Chicago Fire FC	Columbus, Ohio
18:30	Etienne 20'; Valenzuela (yellow card) 68'; Nagbe 81'; Zardes 88'	Report	Pineda (yellow card) 29'; Calvo (yellow card) 48'	Stadium: Mapfre Stadium; Referee: Guido Gonzales Jr.

August 25, 2020 4	Chicago Fire	3–0	FC Cincinnati	Chicago, Illinois
18:30	Herbers 2'; Medrán 10', (yellow card) 61'; Aliseda 67'	Report	Pettersson (yellow card) 36'; Amaya (yellow card) 63'	Stadium: Soldier Field; Referee: Elton García

August 29, 2020 5	New York City FC	3–1	Chicago Fire	New York, New York
18:30	Parks 16'; Sands (yellow card) 36'; Tinnerholm 53'; Ring 75'; Callens (yellow card) 83'	Report	Frankowski (yellow card) 42'; Pineda 45+2'; Calvo (yellow card) 90+1'	Stadium: Yankee Stadium; Referee: Rubiel Vazquez

September 2, 2020 6	FC Cincinnati	0–0	Chicago Fire	Cincinnati, Ohio
19:30	Deplagne (yellow card) 90+6'	Report	Bornstein (yellow card) 90+7'	Stadium: Nippert Stadium; Referee: Marcos de Oliveira

September 6, 2020 7	Chicago Fire	1–2	New England Revolution	Chicago, Illinois
18:00	Herbers 22'	Report	Bunbury 3', 54'; Fagúndez (yellow card) 35'	Stadium: Soldier Field; Referee: Robert Sibiga

September 12, 2020 8	Chicago Fire	2–2	Columbus Crew SC	Chicago, Illinois
18:00	Mihailovic 11'; Berić 14'; Medrán (yellow card) 27'; Navarro (yellow card) 34'; Herbers (yellow card) 56'; Calvo (yellow card) 71'; Bornstein (yellow card) 73'	Report	Mensah (yellow card) 37'; Alashe 68'; Afful (yellow card) 70'; Zardes 88'	Stadium: Soldier Field; Referee: Jon Freemon

September 19, 2020 9	Orlando City SC	4–1	Chicago Fire	Orlando, Florida
19:30	Mueller 11'; Nani 24'; Méndez (yellow card) 66'; Urso 78'; Michel 90+5'	Report	Pineda (yellow card) 15'; Berić 48' (pen.); Sekulić (yellow card) 60'; Calvo (yellow card) 76'; Bronico (yellow card) 86'	Stadium: Exploria Stadium; Referee: Nima Saghafi

September 23, 2020 10	Chicago Fire	4−0	Houston Dynamo	Chicago, Illinois
18:30	Berić 15'; Herbers 23'; Medrán 40'; Pineda (yellow card) 63'; Shuttleworth (yellow card) 70'; Sapong 89' (pen.)	Report	Lassiter (yellow card) 83'; Struna (yellow card) 87'; Marić (yellow card) 89'	Stadium: Soldier Field; Referee: Marcos de Oliveira

September 27, 2020 11	Chicago Fire	2–0	Atlanta United FC	Chicago, Illinois
18:30	Herbers 7'; Berić 39'	Report	Adams (yellow card) 85'	Stadium: Soldier Field; Referee: Kevin Stott

October 3, 2020 12	Montreal Impact	2–2	Chicago Fire	Harrison, New Jersey
18:30	Lappalainen 22'; Urruti 67'; Brault-Guillard (yellow card) 75'; Piette (yellow card) 79'	Report	Berić 15'; Calvo 73'	Stadium: Red Bull Arena; Referee: Guido Gonzales, Jr.

October 7, 2020 13	Sporting Kansas City	1–0	Chicago Fire	Kansas City, Kansas
19:30	Melia (yellow card) 1'; Espinoza (yellow card) 24'; Reid (yellow card) 62', (goal) 67'; Russell (yellow card) 77'; Shelton (yellow card) 80'	Report	Calvo (yellow card) 19'; Herbers (yellow card) 19'; Sekulić (yellow card) 58'	Stadium: Children's Mercy Park; Referee: Marcos de Oliveira

October 11, 2020 14	Chicago Fire	2–1	D.C. United	Chicago, Illinois
18:30	Sapong 3', (yellow card) 89'; Sekulić 45+1'; Azira (yellow card) 59'; Medrán (yellow card) 90'; Shuttleworth (yellow card) 90+1'	Report	Bornstein 56' (o.g.)	Stadium: Soldier Field; Referee: Allen Chapman

October 14, 2020 15	Minnesota United FC	P–P	Chicago Fire	Saint Paul, Minnesota
19:00				Stadium: Allianz Field
Note: Match postponed due to a suspected COVID-19 case in the MNUFC delegation.

October 17, 2020 16	Chicago Fire	2–2	Sporting Kansas City	Chicago, Illinois
14:30	Pineda (yellow card) 22'; Berić 45+1'; Mihailovic 90+5'	Report	Hurtado 35'; Kinda 83'	Stadium: Soldier Field; Referee: David Gantar

October 24, 2020 17	Chicago Fire	2–2	New York Red Bulls	Chicago, Illinois
18:30	Beric 51'; Frankowski 72'	Report	Duncan 39'; Yearwood (yellow card) 54'; Long (yellow card) 79'; White 90+2'	Stadium: Soldier Field; Referee: Ismir Pekmic

October 28, 2020 18	Philadelphia Union	2–1	Chicago Fire	Philadelphia, Pennsylvania
18:30	Przybyłko 28' (pen.); Burke 65'; Elliott (yellow card) 16'; Fontana (yellow card) 48'; Bedoya (yellow card) 68'; Ilsinho (yellow card) 90+4'	Report	Calvo (red card) 36'; Berić 42', (yellow card) 45'; Medrán (yellow card) 57'; Mihailovic (yellow card) 88'	Stadium: Subaru Park; Referee: Guido Gonzales, Jr.

October 31, 2020 19	Nashville SC	1–1	Chicago Fire	Nashville, Tennessee
19:30	Ríos 28'; McCarty (yellow card) 90'	Report	Sekulić 42'	Stadium: Nissan Stadium; Attendance: 3,987; Referee: Malik Badawi

November 4, 2020 20	Minnesota United FC	2–2	Chicago Fire	Saint Paul, Minnesota
19:00	Dibassy (yellow card) 41'; Aja 64', (yellow card) 90+5'; Lod 80'	Report	Berić 17'; Calvo (yellow card) 23'; Pineda 52'; Aliseda (yellow card) 78'	Stadium: Allianz Field; Referee: Victor Rivas
Note: Re-schedule of postponed October 14 match.

November 8, 2020 21	Chicago Fire	3–4	New York City FC	Chicago, Illinois
14:30	Berić 33'; Frankowski 42', 43'	Report	Callens 15'; Mackay-Steven 32'; Medina 37'; Castellanos 77'	Stadium: Soldier Field; Referee: Fotis Bazakos

=== MLS is Back Tournament ===
July 14, 2020 1 MLSiBT group stage	Chicago Fire	2–1	Seattle Sounders FC	Bay Lake, Florida
08:00	Herbers (yellow card) 22'; Berić 52'; Pineda 84'	Report	Hopeau (yellow card) 41'; Gómez (yellow card) 60'; Bwana 77'; Ruidíaz (yellow card) 90'	Stadium: ESPN Wide World of Sports Complex; Referee: Rosendo Mendoza
Note: Match postponed due to the COVID-19 pandemic

July 19, 2020 2 MLSiBT group stage	Chicago Fire	0–2	San Jose	Bay Lake, Florida
19:00	Sekulic (yellow card) 29'; Medrán (yellow card) 53'; Giménez (yellow card) 58'; Herbers (yellow card) 61'; Pineda (yellow card) 62'	Report	Jungwirth (yellow card) 37'; Judson (yellow card) 50'; Espinoza 56'; Wondolowski 83'; Eriksson (yellow card) 86'	Stadium: ESPN Wide World of Sports Complex; Referee: Ramy Touchan
Note: Match postponed due to the COVID-19 pandemic

July 23, 2020 3 MLSiBT group stage	Chicago Fire	0–2	Vancouver Whitecaps FC	Bay Lake, Florida
8:00	Giménez (yellow card) 81'; Herbers (yellow card) 90+2'	Report	Reyna 65'; Hasal (yellow card) 71'; Dájome 71'	Stadium: ESPN Wide World of Sports Complex; Referee: Armando Villarreal
Note: Match postponed due to the COVID-19 pandemic

=== Open Cup ===
Kickoff times are in CST (UTC-06)

3rd Round	v

== Squad statistics ==
=== Games played ===
No.	Pos.	Nat.	Name	MLS			Open Cup			Total		
No.	Pos.	Nat.	Name	Starts	Apps	Minutes	Starts	Apps	Minutes	Starts	Apps	Minutes
1	GK	USA	Bobby Shuttleworth									
2	DF	SVK	Boris Sekulić									
3	DF	USA	Jonathan Bornstein	1	1	90				1	1	90
4	DF	NED	Johan Kappelhof	1	1	90				1	1	90
5	DF	CRC	Francisco Calvo	1	1	90				1	1	90
6	D	VEN	Miguel Navarro									
7	MF	ARG	Ignacio Aliseda									
8	MF	SER	Luka Stojanović									
9	FW	USA	C. J. Sapong									
10	MF	ESP	Álvaro Medrán	1	1	90				1	1	90
11	MF	POL	Przemysław Frankowski	1	1	90				1	1	90
13	MF	USA	Brandt Bronico	1	1	90				1	1	90
14	MF	USA	Djordje Mihailovic	1	1	70				1	1	70
16	MF	UGA	Michael Azira		1	9					1	9
18	GK	USA	Kenneth Kronholm	1	1	90				1	1	90
20	DF	USA	Wyatt Omsberg									
21	FW	GER	Fabian Herbers	1	1	81				1	1	81
22	DF/MF	USA	Mauricio Pineda	1	1	90				1	1	90
24	GK	USA	Connor Sparrow									
25	DF	USA	Nicholas Slonina									
28	FW	NZL	Elliot Collier		1	20					1	20
27	FW	SVN	Robert Berić	1	1	90				1	1	90
30	MF	ARG	Gastón Giménez									
32	GK	USA	Gabriel Slonina									
33	MF	USA	Jeremiah Gutjahr									
36	DF	USA	Andre Reynolds III									
—	GK	USA	Chris Brady									
—	MF	USA	Javier Casas									
—	MF	USA	Brian Gutiérrez									
—	FW	USA	Alex Monis									
—	MF	USA	Allan Rodríguez									

=== Goalkeeping statistics ===
No.	Nat.	Name	MLS			Open Cup			Total		
No.	Nat.	Name	Clean sheets	Saves	GA	Clean sheets	Saves	GA	Clean sheets	Saves	GA
1	USA	Bobby Shuttleworth									
18	USA	Kenneth Kronholm		4	2					4	2
24	USA	Connor Sparrow									
32	USA	Gabriel Slonina									
—	USA	Chris Brady									

=== Goalscoring and assisting record ===
MLS Regular Season

Rank	Player	Goal	A

Open Cup

Rank	Player	Goal	A

MLS regular season

Rank	Player	Goal	A
1	(Slovenia) Robert Berić	1	

=== Cards ===
MLS Regular Season

Rank	Player	Booked	(yellow card) (yellow-red card)	Sent off (straight red)	Matches Missed
1	(Germany) Fabian Herbers	1			

Open Cup

Rank	Player	Booked	(yellow card) (yellow-red card)	Sent off (straight red)	Matches Missed

Totals

Rank	Player	Booked	(yellow card) (yellow-red card)	Sent off (straight red)	Matches Missed

Note: Italics indicates a player who left during the season

== Player awards ==
=== Fire awards ===
Man of the Match awards

Game #	Player	Position	Notable Statistics	Reference
1	(Slovenia) Robert Berić	FW	1 G	
2				
3				
4				
5				
6				
7				
8				
9				
10				
11				
12				
13				
14				
15				
16				
17				
18				
19				
20				
21				
22				
23				
24				
25				
26				
27				
28				
29				
30				
31				
32				
33				
34				

Note: Italics indicates player left after his first call up

== National team call-ups ==
Costa Rica
Francisco Calvo

- 2019–20 CONCACAF Nations League A Match vs Haiti, October 10
- 2019–20 CONCACAF Nations League A Match vs Curaçao, October 13
- 2019–20 CONCACAF Nations League A Match vs Haiti, November 14
- 2019–20 CONCACAF Nations League A Match vs Curaçao, November 17

New Zealand
Elliot Collier

- Friendly vs Republic of Ireland, November 14
- Friendly vs Lithuania, November 17

Panama
Cristian Martínez

- 2019–20 CONCACAF Nations League A Match vs Mexico, November 15
- Friendly vs Bolivia, November 19

Poland
Przemysław Frankowski

- Euro 2020 Qualifying Match vs Latvia, October 10
- Euro 2020 Qualifying Match vs North Macedonia, October 13
- Euro 2020 Qualifying Match vs Israel, November 16
- Euro 2020 Qualifying Match vs Slovenia, November 19

Uganda
Michael Azira

- 2021 Africa Cup of Nations qualification Group B Match vs Burkina Faso, November 13
- 2021 Africa Cup of Nations qualification Group B Match vs Malawi, November 17

(United States) United States
U-23 Team
Djordje Mihailovic

- Friendly vs El Salvador, October 15
- United International Football Festival Semifinal Match vs Brazil, November 14
- United International Football Festival Third Place Match or Final vs United Gran Canaria, November 17

U-20 Team
Andre Reynolds II

- Friendly vs Mexico U-20, January 16
- Friendly vs Mexico U-20, January 18

U-17 Team
Gabriel Slonina

- UEFA Development Tournament match vs Spain, February 19
- UEFA Development Tournament match vs England, February 21
- UEFA Development Tournament match vs Denmark, February 24

U-16 Team
Gabriel Slonina

- 2019 NIKE International Friendly vs Netherlands, November 14
- 2019 NIKE International Friendly vs US U-17, November 16
- 2019 NIKE International Friendly vs Turkey, November 18

Note: Italics indicates player left after his first call up
