= Chris Brady (soccer) =

American soccer player (born 2004)

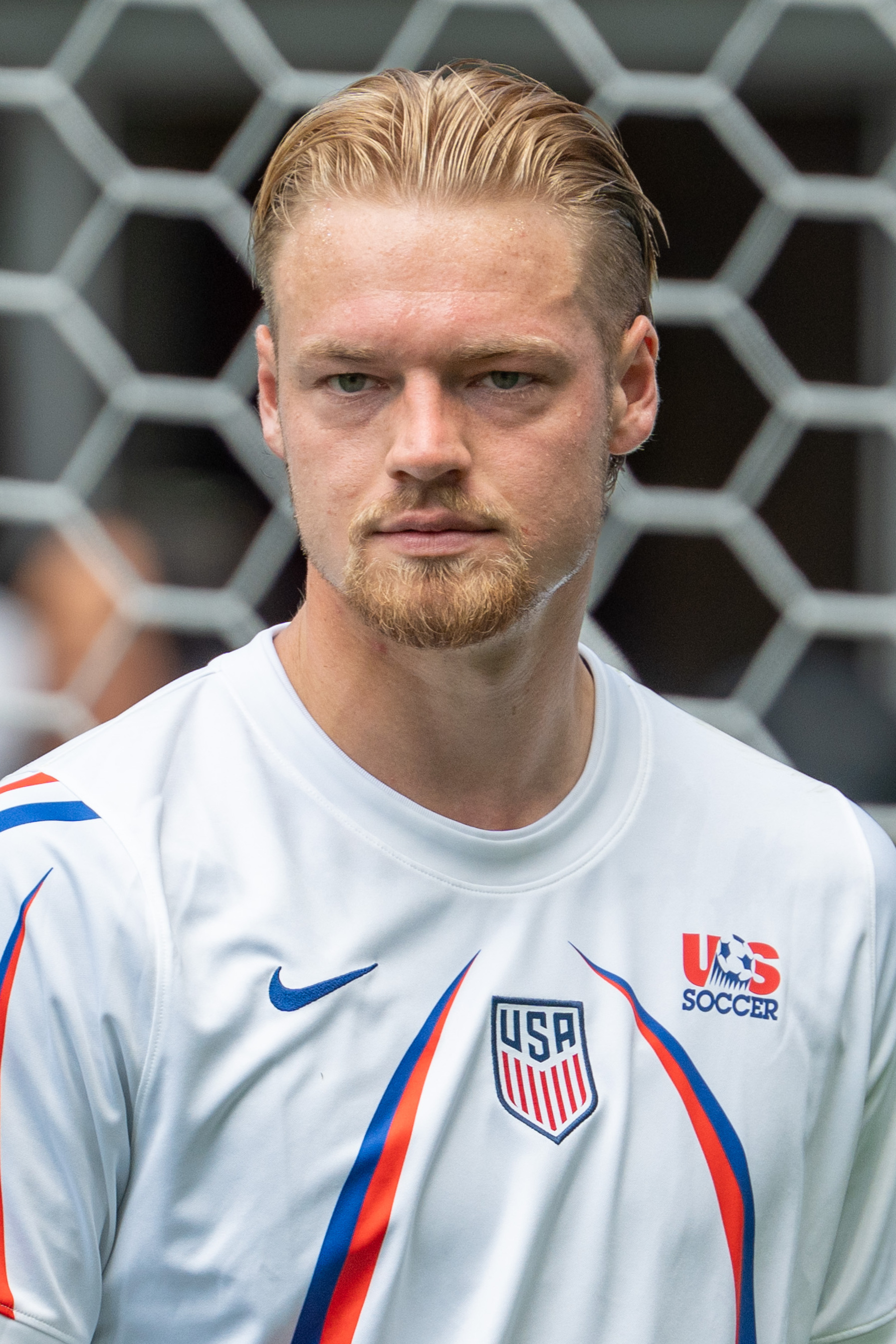
- Brady with the United States in 2026

Personal information
- Full name: Christopher Keith Brady
- Date of birth: March 3, 2004 (age 22)
- Place of birth: Naperville, Illinois, U.S.
- Height: 6 ft 3 in (1.91 m)
- Position: Goalkeeper

Team information
- Current team: Chicago Fire
- Number: 1

Youth career
- 2017–2020: Chicago Fire

Senior career*
Years	Team	Apps	(Gls)
2020–	Chicago Fire	124	(0)
2020–2021	→ Forward Madison (loan)	9	(0)
2022	→ Chicago Fire II (loan)	12	(0)

International career^{‡}
2019	United States U15	2	(0)
2022	United States U20	9	(0)
2023–2024	United States U23	3	(0)
2026–	United States	2	(0)
Medal record
Representing United States
Men's football
CONCACAF Gold Cup
Runner-up	2025 Canada–United States
- * Club domestic league appearances and goals as of November 17, 2026 ‡ National team caps and goals as of September 29, 2026

Christopher Keith Brady (born March 3, 2004) is an American professional soccer player who plays as a goalkeeper for Major League Soccer club Chicago Fire and the United States national team.

== Club career ==
Born in Naperville, Illinois, Brady joined the Chicago Fire in 2017, playing with the youth academy.

On March 24, 2020, Brady signed a homegrown player deal with the Fire, joining the club's first team in Major League Soccer.

On July 24, 2020, Brady was loaned to USL League One club Forward Madison. He made his professional debut for the club on August 23 against Orlando City B, starting in a 3–1 victory.

On November 13, 2020, following the 2020 season, Brady was named as the USL League One Young Player of the Year. In eight matches, Brady recorded three clean sheets throughout his loan.

The next season, Brady returned to Forward Madison on June 11, 2021, on loan. Similar to the previous season, Brady would split his training with both Forward Madison while returning to the Chicago Fire occasionally. A day later, on June 12, Brady made his return debut for the club against the Richmond Kickers. He earned the cleansheet in the 0–0 draw, including saving a one-on-one opportunity against the Kickers' Emiliano Terzaghi.

== International career ==
Born in the United States, Brady is of Scottish descent and eligible to play for both national teams.

=== Youth ===
On January 25, 2019, he was selected into the United States under-15 side that would participate in the CONCACAF Boys' Under-15 Championship. Brady led the United States under-20 team to the 2022 CONCACAF U-20 Championship title and won the Golden Glove award, awarded to the tournament's best goalkeeper. He earned three caps for the United States under-23s in the buildup to the 2024 Olympics but did not make the final squad.

=== Senior ===
On May 26, 2026, Brady was selected by United States head coach Mauricio Pochettino for the 2026 FIFA World Cup. With Brady's selection, he became the first player to be selected for the United States' FIFA World Cup squad without prior international senior experience since Juergen Sommer in 1994. Five days later, Brady made his debut as a second-half substitute in a 3–2 friendly win over Senegal. His next cap, and first start, came in a friendly win over Chile on September 29, 2026.

== Career statistics ==
=== Club ===
As of match played May 23, 2026

Appearances and goals by club, season and competition
Club	Season	League			National cup		Playoffs		Continental		Other		Total	
Club	Season	Division	Apps	Goals	Apps	Goals	Apps	Goals	Apps	Goals	Apps	Goals	Apps	Goals
Chicago Fire	2020	Major League Soccer	0	0	—		—		—		—		0	0
Chicago Fire	2022	Major League Soccer	1	0	0	0	—		—		—		1	0
Chicago Fire	2023	Major League Soccer	30	0	0	0	—		—		2 (Note: Appearances in Leagues Cup)	0	32	0
Chicago Fire	2024	Major League Soccer	33	0	—		—		—		—		33	0
Chicago Fire	2025	Major League Soccer	28	0	3	0	2	0	—		—		33	0
Chicago Fire	2026	Major League Soccer	14	0	2	0	—		—		—		16	0
Chicago Fire	Total		106	0	5	0	2	0	—		2	0	115	0
Forward Madison (loan)	2020	USL League One	8	0	—		—		—		—		8	0
Forward Madison (loan)	2021	USL League One	1	0	—		—		—		—		1	0
Forward Madison (loan)	Total		9	0	—		—		—		—		9	0
Chicago Fire FC II (loan)	2022	MLS Next Pro	12	0	—		—		—		—		12	0
Career total			127	0	5	0	2	0	0	0	2	0	136	0

=== International ===
As of match played September 29, 2026

Appearances and goals by national team and year
National team	Year	Apps	Goals
United States	2026	2	0
Total		2	0

== Honors ==
United States U20

- CONCACAF U-20 Championship: 2022

Individual

- USL League One Young Player of the Year: 2020
- CONCACAF U-20 Championship Best XI: 2022
- CONCACAF U-20 Championship Golden Glove: 2022
