= Merlo =

Merlo may refer to:

- Merlo (company), a manufacturer of telescopic handlers based in Italy
- Merlo Partido, Buenos Aires Province, Argentina
  - Merlo, Buenos Aires, head town of Merlo Partido
  - Deportivo Merlo, a football team based here
- Merlo Station High School, in Beaverton, Oregon
- Villa de Merlo, San Luis Province, Argentina

== People with the surname ==
- Beatrice Merlo
- Carmelo Merlo
- Claudio Merlo
- Enrica Merlo
- Enrique Gorriarán Merlo
- Francisco de Merlo
- Francisco López de Osornio Merlo
- Gastón Merlo
- Gianni Merlo
- Giuseppe Merlo
- Harry Merlo
- Ismael Merlo
- Jaime Jiménez Merlo
- Janet Merlo
- Jim Merlo
- Johann Jakob Merlo
- John Merlo
- Larry Merlo
- Liliana Merlo
- Luis Merlo
- Madeline Merlo
- María Luisa Merlo
- Maria Teresa Merlo
- Michele Merlo (cyclist)
- Michele Merlo (singer)
- Miguel Antonio de Merlo
- Mike Merlo
- Nelson Merlo
- Néstor Merlo
- Omar Merlo
- Paul Merlo
- Reinaldo Merlo
- Rick Merlo
- Yoan "ToD" Merlo
- Carmen García de Merlo

== See also ==
- Merlot
