= Kenneth Kronholm =

American-German footballer

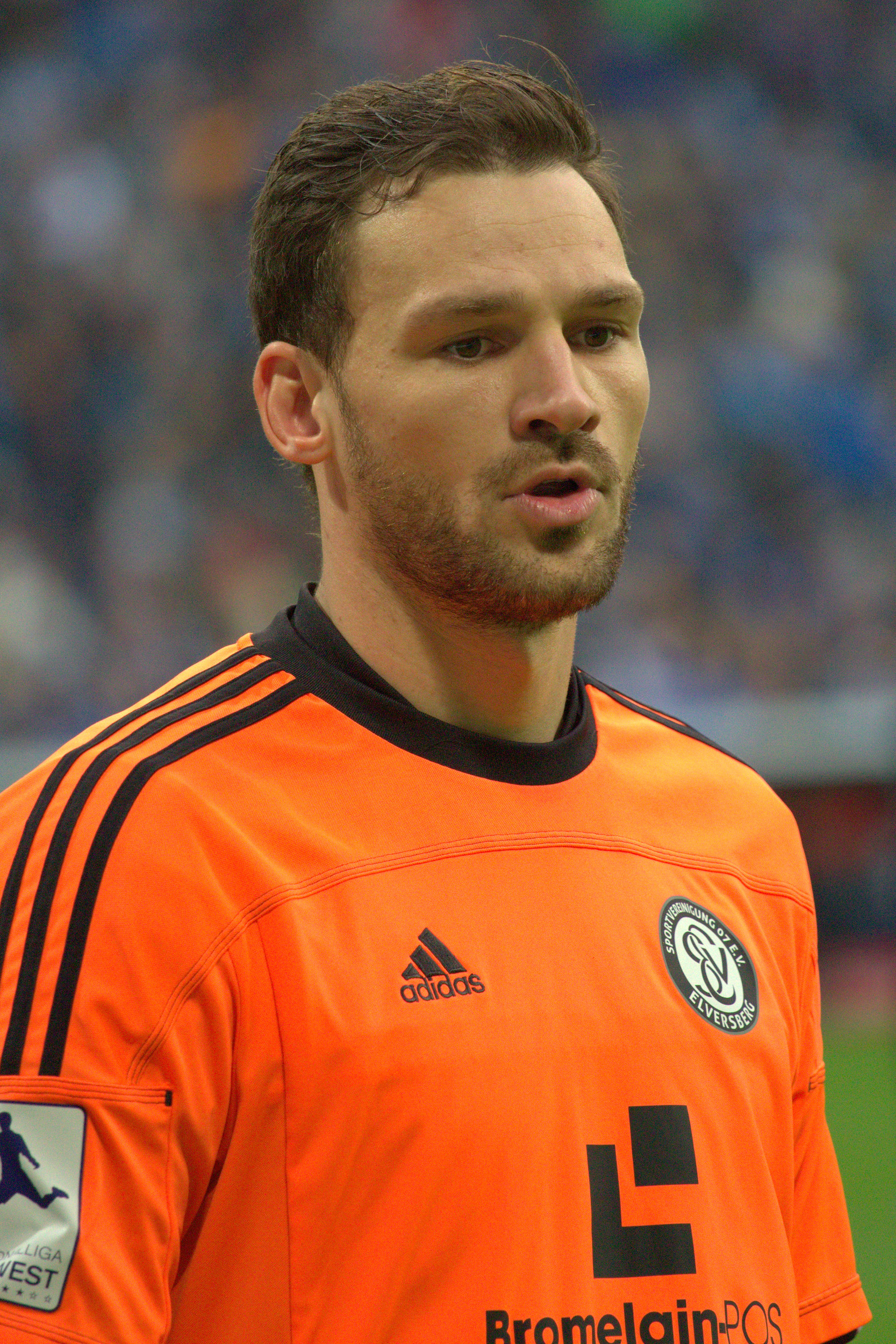
- Kronholm with SV Elversberg

Personal information
- Date of birth: October 14, 1985 (age 41)
- Place of birth: Fort Belvoir, Virginia, United States
- Height: 1.89 m (6 ft 2 in)
- Position: Goalkeeper

Youth career
- 1999–2000: SG Oftersheim
- 2000–2003: Waldhof Mannheim
- 2003–2004: VfL Wolfsburg

Senior career*
Years	Team	Apps	(Gls)
2004–2005	VfL Wolfsburg II	0	(0)
2005	Carl Zeiss Jena	0	(0)
2005–2006	Wormatia Worms	5	(0)
2006–2007	Fortuna Düsseldorf	13	(0)
2007–2008	FSV Frankfurt	6	(0)
2008–2009	Hansa Rostock II	13	(0)
2009–2010	Eintracht Trier	22	(0)
2010–2011	Waldhof Mannheim	0	(0)
2011	Jahn Regensburg	0	(0)
2011–2012	VfR Mannheim	14	(0)
2012–2014	SV Elversberg	74	(0)
2014–2019	Holstein Kiel	135	(0)
2019–2021	Chicago Fire	25	(0)
Total		307	(0)
- * Club domestic league appearances and goals as of 16:08, 10 November 2021 (UTC)

Kenneth Kronholm (born October 14, 1985) is an American former professional soccer player who played as a goalkeeper. The son of an American father and a German mother, Kenneth Kronholm was born in Fort Belvoir, Virginia but grew up mostly in Heidelberg, Germany. Following a long career in Germany, he transferred to the Major League Soccer side Chicago Fire FC in 2019. Following the 2021 season, Kronholm's contract option was declined by Chicago.

== Career statistics ==
=== Club ===
As of match played 23 August 2020

Appearances and goals by club, season and competition
Club	Season	League			National Cup		Other		Total	
Club	Season	Division	Apps	Goals	Apps	Goals	Apps	Goals	Apps	Goals
Fortuna Düsseldorf	2006–07	Regionalliga Nord	13	0	—		—		13	0
FSV Frankfurt	2007–08	Regionalliga Süd	6	0	—		—		6	0
Hansa Rostock II	2007–08	Overliga Nord	7	0	—		—		7	0
Hansa Rostock II	2008–09	Regionalliga Nord	5	0	—		—		5	0
Hansa Rostock II	Total		12	0	0	0	0	0	12	0
Eintracht Trier	2009–10	Regionalliga West	22	0	3	0	—		25	0
SV Elversberg	2012–13	Regionalliga Südwest	36	0	—		—		36	0
SV Elversberg	2013–14	3. Liga	38	0	—		2 (Note: Appearance(s) in Relegation Playoffs)	0	40	0
SV Elversberg	Total		74	0	0	0	2	0	76	0
Holstein Kiel	2014–15	3. Liga	38	0	1	0	2	0	41	0
Holstein Kiel	2015–16	3. Liga	0	0	—		—		0	0
Holstein Kiel	2016–17	3. Liga	37	0	—		—		37	0
Holstein Kiel	2017–18	2. Bundesliga	33	0	2	0	2	0	37	0
Holstein Kiel	2018–19	2. Bundesliga	27	0	3	0	0	0	30	0
Holstein Kiel	Total		135	0	6	0	4	0	145	0
Chicago Fire	2019	Major League Soccer	20	0	1	0	—		21	0
Chicago Fire	2020	Major League Soccer	5	0	—		—		5	0
Chicago Fire	Total		25	0	1	0	0	0	26	0
Career total			287	0	10	0	6	0	303	0
