= Michael Vang =

Laotian footballer

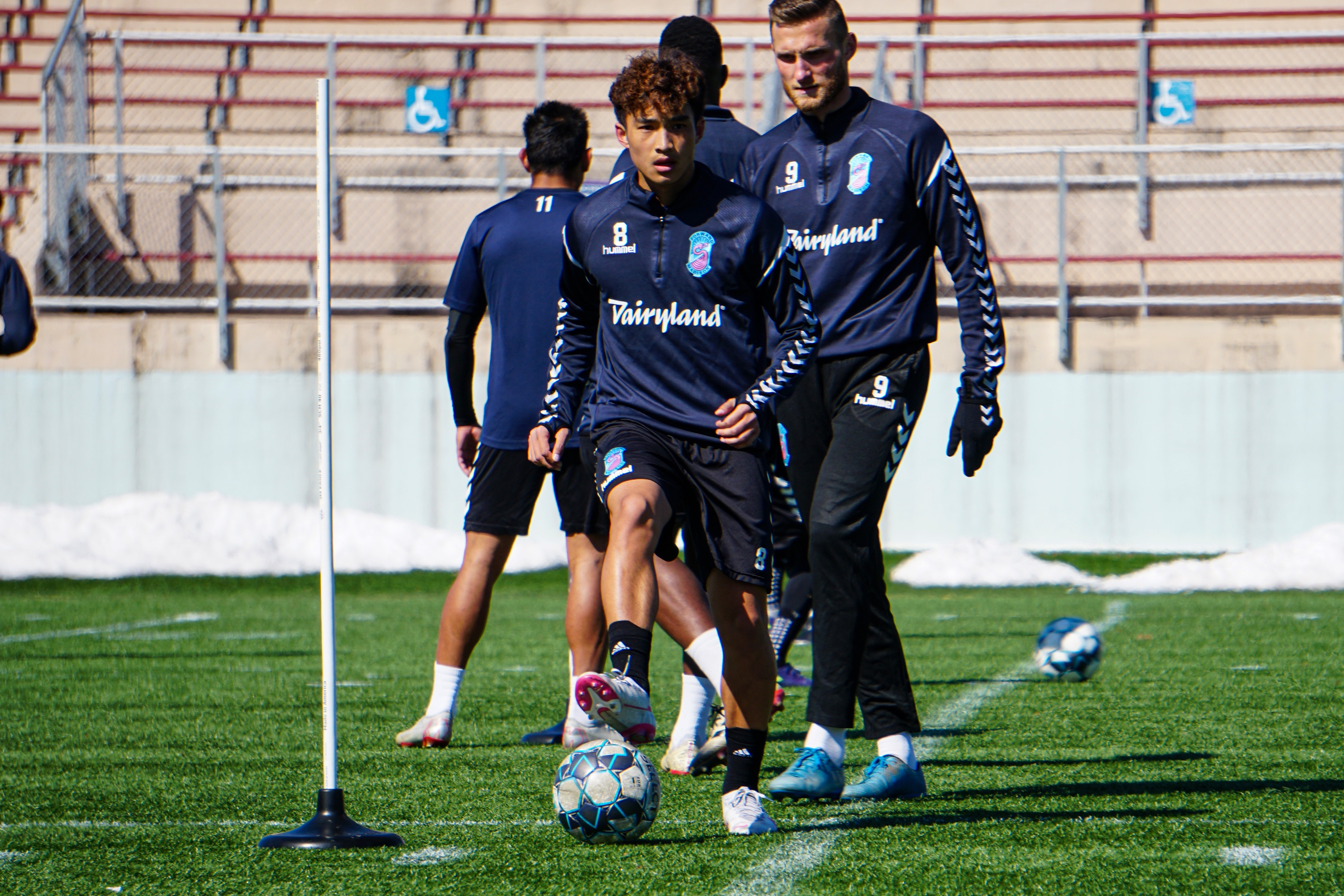

Personal information
- Full name: Michael Vang
- Date of birth: May 13, 2000 (age 26)
- Place of birth: Saint Paul, Minnesota, United States
- Height: 5 ft 8 in (1.73 m)
- Position: Midfielder

Youth career
- 2013–2015: Minnesota Thunder Academy
- 2016–2018: Shattuck-Saint Mary's

Senior career*
Years	Team	Apps	(Gls)
2018–2019	1º de Dezembro	3	(0)
2020–2021	Forward Madison	24	(4)
2022	Columbus Crew 2	22	(2)
2023	Portland Timbers 2	19	(2)
2024	Miami FC	4	(0)

International career
2023	Laos	5	(0)
- * Club domestic league appearances and goals as of 14:18, 12 April 2024 (UTC)

Michael Vang (born May 13, 2000) is a professional footballer. Born in the United States, he represented the Laos national team.

== Playing career ==
=== Youth ===
Vang played in the U.S. Soccer Development Academy through Shattuck-Saint Mary's in high school.

Vang was committed to play soccer for the University of the Pacific, but decided instead to pursue playing professionally.

=== 1º Dezembro ===
In July 2018, Vang joined Portuguese third tier league club 1º de Dezembro that plays in the Campeonato de Portuga. Vang was promoted to the first team in 2019 and started three league games.

=== Forward Madison ===
On 14 January 2020, Vang signed with Forward Madison of the USL League One prior to the 2020 season. He scored on his debut for the club in a 4–0 league win over Tormenta on 15 August 2020.

=== Columbus Crew 2 ===
On February 18, 2022, Vang joined Columbus Crew 2, the reserve side of Major League Soccer's Columbus Crew, ahead of their inaugural MLS Next Pro season. On 26 March, He made his debut in a 2–0 loss against Inter Miami II. On 24 July, he scored a brace in a 4–1 win over New England Revolution II. He made 22 appearances for the team and scored two goals, but was released at the end of the season

=== Portland Timbers 2 ===
On 2 March 2023, Vang signed with Portland Timbers 2 of MLS Next Pro, the reserve side of the Portland Timbers. He made his debut on 10 April in a match against Colorado Rapids 2.

=== Miami FC ===
In January 2024, Vang joined USL Championship club Miami FC, making his debut in a 1–0 loss to Sacramento Republic on 17 March.

== International career ==
Vang was called up to the Laos national team in March 2023 for their upcoming international friendly in March. He made his debut for Laos in a 2–0 defeat to Nepal on 22 March.

== Personal life ==
Vang was born to a Hmong family originally hailing from Laos, making him eligible to represent the country at international level. He is the first Hmong to play professional soccer in the United States.

== Honours ==
Columbus Crew 2

- MLS Next Pro: 2022
