= Juan Álvarez (footballer, born July 1996) =

Mexican footballer

Juan Manuel Álvarez
Personal information
- Full name: Juan Manuel Álvarez Hernández
- Date of birth: 1 July 1996 (age 30)
- Place of birth: Ahome, Sinaloa, México
- Height: 1.78 m (5 ft 10 in)
- Position: Defender

Youth career
- 2011–2015: Monterrey

Senior career*
Years	Team	Apps	(Gls)
2015–2018	Monterrey	3	(0)
2019	→ Gavilanes de Matamoros (loan)	8	(0)
2020	→ North Texas SC (loan)	5	(0)
2021	→ Raya2 (loan)	0	(0)
- * Club domestic league appearances and goals as of 25 October 2020

Juan Manuel Álvarez Hernández (Note: In this Spanish name, the first or paternal surname is Álvarez and the second or maternal family name is Hernández.) (born 1 July 1996) is a Mexican professional footballer who plays as a defender.

== Honours ==
Monterrey

- Copa MX: Apertura 2017
