= Jesus Perez (soccer, born 1997) =

American soccer player

Personal information
- Date of birth: October 1, 1997 (age 29)
- Place of birth: Waukegan, Illinois, United States
- Height: 1.78 m (5 ft 10 in)
- Position: Midfielder

Youth career
- Chicago Fire

College career
Years	Team	Apps	(Gls)
2016	Akron Zips	8	(1)
2016–2019	UIC Flames	55	(14)

Senior career*
Years	Team	Apps	(Gls)
2016–2019	Chicago FC United	30	(9)
2020	Tacoma Defiance	14	(3)
2021	Dundalk	2	(0)
2021	→ Forward Madison (loan)	10	(0)
2022	Chicago FC United	0	(0)
- * Club domestic league appearances and goals as of October 31, 2022

Jesus "Chino" Perez (Spanish: Jesús Pérez; born October 1, 1997) is an American soccer player who plays as a midfielder.

== Career ==
Perez was selected by New York City FC with the 22nd pick in the first round of the 2020 MLS SuperDraft, and was included on the club's preseason roster. He wasn't retained by the club beyond preseason, instead signing for Tacoma Defiance of the USL Championship in mid-February 2020. Pérez signed for League of Ireland Premier Division club Dundalk on the 26th February 2021. He made his debut for the club on the 26th March 2021, replacing Sam Stanton at half-time in a 2–1 defeat to Finn Harps at Oriel Park. On the 5th July 2021, it was announced that Perez was loaned out to USL League One club Forward Madison until the end of the season, having made just 2 appearances for Dundalk. He made his debut in a friendly match against Mexican club Atlético Morelia on 20 July 2021.
