= Ethan Hardin =

English footballer

Personal information
- Date of birth: 26 February 2003 (age 23)
- Place of birth: Cambridge, England
- Height: 1.83 m (6 ft 0 in)
- Position: Defender

Team information
- Current team: Biola Eagles
- Number: 5

Youth career
- 2014–2017: Elite SA
- 2017–2019: Boca United FC
- 2019–2020: Inter Miami

College career
Years	Team	Apps	(Gls)
2022–	Biola Eagles	18	(4)

Senior career*
Years	Team	Apps	(Gls)
2020–2022	Inter Miami CF II	39	(1)
- * Club domestic league appearances and goals as of 19 September 2022

Ethan Hardin (born 26 February 2003) is an English footballer who played as a defender for Inter Miami CF II and currently plays for Biola Eagles.

== Career ==
=== Inter Miami CF II ===
Hardin made his league debut for the club on 8 August 2020, playing the entirety of a 2–1 away victory over Tormenta FC.

In his first season (2020), Hardin led the team in passing, with 741 (8th in League One), and in passing accuracy (90.7%). Hardin also had the second-most interceptions (25) and tied for a team-high 17 aerial duels won.

=== Inter Miami CF ===
In Inter Miami's preseason home international friendly versus Peru's "La U" on 26 January 2022, Hardin made his first appearance as a second-half substitute, wearing #34 and playing the left centerback position in a 3-4-3 formation. In the 72-minute, Hardin, at 18 years old, became the youngest goal scorer in Inter Miami franchise history when he scored a brilliant bouncing header from a corner kick to cap off an Inter Miami 4–0 victory.
