= Beni Redžić =

American soccer player

Personal information
- Full name: Benjamin Redžić
- Date of birth: September 26, 2002 (age 24)
- Place of birth: Carrollton, Texas, United States
- Height: 1.78 m (5 ft 10 in)
- Positions: Forward; midfielder

Team information
- Current team: Velež Mostar
- Number: 14

Youth career
- 2008–2021: FC Dallas

Senior career*
| Years | Team | Apps | (Gls) |
| 2020–2021 | North Texas SC | 15 | (3) |
| 2021–2023 | FC Dallas | 6 | (0) |
| 2024 | Real Monarchs | 20 | (3) |
| 2026– | Velež Mostar | 0 | (0) |

International career
| 2017–2018 | United States U17 | 5 | (2) |
| 2019 | Bosnia and Herzegovina U18 | 2 | (0) |
- * Club domestic league appearances and goals as of December 13, 2024

Benjamin Redžić (born September 26, 2002), also known as Beni Redžić, is professional soccer player who plays as a midfielder for Bosnian Premier League club Velež Mostar.

== Career ==
=== North Texas ===
Redžić made his league debut for the club on July 25, 2020, scoring the winning goal in a 2–1 home victory over Forward Madison.

=== FC Dallas ===
On April 9, 2021, Redžić signed a homegrown player contract with FC Dallas. In June, he suffered an ankle injury that required surgery, causing him to miss the remainder of the 2021 season.

Following the 2022 season, Redžić's contract option was declined by Dallas.

=== Real Monarchs ===
On March 12, 2024, the MLS Next Pro club, Real Monarchs, announced that they had signed Redžić for the 2024 season.

=== 2025 Season ===
In June 2025, Redžić reportedly signed a multi-year contract with Swiss club AC Bellinzona, but the deal stalled due to prolonged work visa delays.

=== Velež Mostar ===
On 9 July 2026, Velež Mostar, announced a 2 year contract with a possible one year extension for Redžić as a midfielder.

== Career statistics ==
=== Club ===
As of match played 14 September 2024

Appearances and goals by club, season and competition
| Club | Season | League | | | National cup (Note: Includes U.S. Open Cup) | | Total | |
| Club | Season | Division | Apps | Goals | Apps | Goals | Apps | Goals |
|---|---|---|---|---|---|---|---|---|
| North Texas SC | 2020 | USL League One | 13 | 3 | — | | 13 | 3 |
| North Texas SC | 2021 | USL League One | 2 | 0 | — | | 2 | 0 |
| North Texas SC | Total | | 15 | 3 | — | | 15 | 3 |
| FC Dallas | 2022 | Major League Soccer | 6 | 0 | 2 | 0 | 8 | 0 |
| Real Monarchs | 2024 | MLS Next Pro | 20 | 3 | — | | 20 | 3 |
| Velež Mostar | 2026–27 | Bosnian Premier League | 0 | 0 | 0 | 0 | 0 | 0 |
| Career total | | | 41 | 6 | 2 | 0 | 43 | 6 |
