= Xerlin =

Open-source XML editor

Xerlin is an open source XML editor for the Java 2 platform released under an Apache style license. The project is a Java based XML modeling application written to make creating and editing XML files easier. The latest version of Xerlin is 1.3, which was released in May 2005.

== Project Details ==
Xerlin contains contributions originally made to the Merlot XML editor project, the open source project on which Xerlin is based. ChannelPoint founded and hosted the Merlot XML Editor as an open source project during 2000-2001. Xerlin was created to build on those foundations and in fact used some of the same developers.

Xerlin runs on any Java 2 virtual machine (JDK1.2.2 or higher). The application is extensible via custom editor interfaces that can be added for individual DTD's. Xerlin can validate XML against both DTDs and Schemas.

== See also ==
- Exari - Project founders
