= Allan Rodriguez (soccer) =

American soccer player

Allan Rodríguez
Personal information
- Full name: Allan Rodríguez Lopez
- Date of birth: May 27, 2004 (age 22)
- Place of birth: Elkhart, Indiana, United States
- Height: 5 ft 6 in (1.68 m)
- Position: Midfielder

Youth career
- 2017–2019: Indiana Fire
- 2019–2020: Chicago Fire

Senior career*
Years	Team	Apps	(Gls)
2020–2023	Chicago Fire	0	(0)
2020	→ Forward Madison (loan)	2	(0)
2022–2023	Chicago Fire FC II	17	(0)

International career^{‡}
2019	United States U15	10	(1)
- * Club domestic league appearances and goals as of November 5, 2023 ‡ National team caps and goals as of August 10, 2019

Allan Rodríguez Lopez (born May 27, 2004) is an American professional soccer player who plays as a midfielder.

== Club career ==
=== Chicago Fire ===
Born in Elkhart, Indiana, Rodríguez began his career with the Indiana Fire before joining the Chicago Fire youth academy in 2019. On March 25, 2020, he signed with the Fire first team as a homegrown player in Major League Soccer.

==== Forward Madison (loan) ====
On July 24, 2020, Rodríguez joined USL League One club Forward Madison on loan for the remainder of the 2020 season. He made his debut for Forward Madison on August 8, starting and playing 62 minutes against the Richmond Kickers.

== International career ==
Born in the United States to Mexican parents, Rodriguez holds a U.S. and Mexican citizenship, which makes him eligible to represent either the United States or Mexico. Rodríguez has represented the United States at the under-15s, captaining his country during the CONCACAF Boys' Under-15 Championship.

== Career statistics ==
As of match played May 28, 2022

Appearances and goals by club, season and competition
Club	Season	League			National cup		Other		Total	
Club	Season	Division	Apps	Goals	Apps	Goals	Apps	Goals	Apps	Goals
Chicago Fire	2020	Major League Soccer	0	0	—		—		0	0
Forward Madison (loan)	2020	USL League One	2	0	—		—		2	0
Chicago Fire FC II	2022	MLS Next Pro	11	0	—		—		11	0
Career total			13	0	0	0	0	0	13	0
