= Jamael Cox =

American soccer player (born 1992)

Personal information
- Full name: Jamael Benjamin Cox
- Date of birth: April 27, 1992 (age 34)
- Place of birth: Tacoma, Washington, United States
- Height: 1.75 m (5 ft 9 in)
- Position: Midfielder

Team information
- Current team: Tacoma Stars
- Number: 11

Youth career
- 2006–2008: Northwest Nationals
- 2008–2010: Washington Premier
- 2010–2011: Seattle Sounders

Senior career*
Years	Team	Apps	(Gls)
2012	Seattle Sounders U-23	14	(2)
2013	Tampa Bay Rowdies	1	(0)
2014	Seattle Sounders U-23	10	(0)
2014–	Tacoma Stars (indoor)	134	(102)
2015–2017	Burlingame Dragons	32	(9)
2018	Seattle Sounders U-23	14	(3)
2019	FC Tucson	23	(3)
2020	Forward Madison	14	(0)
- * Club domestic league appearances and goals as of November 27, 2024

Jamael Benjamin Cox (born April 27, 1992) is an American soccer player who plays for the Tacoma Stars in the Major Arena Soccer League.

== Career ==
=== Youth ===
Cox spent one season with the Seattle Sounders FC Academy.

After trialing in Scotland with Rangers and in Germany with 1. FC Nürnberg, Cox joined USL PDL club Seattle Sounders FC U-23 for the 2012 season. He made 14 appearances for the club and tallied two goals and two assists and helped guide the team to a Northwest Division title and a Western Conference title before eventually losing in the USL PDL semifinals to Forest City London.

=== Professional ===
On June 4, 2013, Cox signed his first professional contract as he joined NASL club Tampa Bay Rowdies on a two-year deal, reuniting him with his older brother Raphael. He made his professional debut on October 5, 2013, in a 2–1 defeat to the Fort Lauderdale Strikers.

Cox played for FC Tucson in the inaugural USL League One season in 2019, scoring 3 goals in 23 appearances.

On December 21, 2019, Forward Madison FC announced it had signed Cox.

On June 7, 2016, Cox scored the lone goal in a 40-minute scrimmage between the Burlingame Dragons and the Argentina national football team.

== Honors ==
=== Seattle Sounders FC U-23 ===
- USL PDL Northwest Division Champions (1): 2012
- USL PDL Western Conference Champions (1): 2012
