= Alisson (footballer, born 1999) =

Brazilian footballer

Personal information
- Full name: Alisson dos Santos Correa
- Date of birth: December 3, 1999 (age 26)
- Place of birth: Leme, São Paulo, Brazil
- Height: 5 ft 11 in (1.80 m)
- Position: Defensive midfielder

Team information
- Current team: North Texas SC
- Number: 27

Youth career
- 2014: CAL/Bariri
- 2015: Lemense
- 2016: XV de Jaú
- 2016: Santos
- 2017–2019: São Paulo

Senior career*
Years	Team	Apps	(Gls)
2020–	North Texas SC	27	(1)
- * Club domestic league appearances and goals as of 31 October 2021

Alisson dos Santos Correa (born 3 December 1999) is a Brazilian professional footballer who plays as a defensive midfielder for USL League One club North Texas SC.

== Career ==
On 14 January 2020, Alisson joined USL League One side North Texas SC from São Paulo. He made his debut for the club on 25 July 2020, starting in a 2–1 win over Forward Madison.
