= Josiah Trimmingham =

Trinidadian footballer (born 1996)

Personal information
- Full name: Josiah Josha Trimmingham
- Date of birth: 14 December 1996 (age 29)
- Place of birth: San Juan, Trinidad and Tobago
- Height: 1.85 m (6 ft 1 in)
- Position: Defender

Team information
- Current team: Montego Bay United

Senior career*
Years	Team	Apps	(Gls)
2014–2017	San Juan Jabloteh		
2017–2018	Club Sando		
2019	FC Miami City	9	(2)
2019–2020	Central		
2020–2021	Forward Madison	24	(4)
2023–2024	Club Sando		
2024–	Montego Bay United		

International career^{‡}
2017–	Trinidad and Tobago	10	(1)
- * Club domestic league appearances and goals as of 19:02, 11 February 2025 (UTC) ‡ National team caps and goals as of 19:02, 11 February 2025 (UTC)

Josiah Josha Trimmingham (born 14 December 1996) is a Trinidadian professional footballer who plays as a defender for Montego Bay United.

== Club career ==
Born in San Juan, Trimmingham spent his early career with San Juan Jabloteh, Club Sando, FC Miami City and Central.

Trimmingham was signed by Forward Madison FC ahead of the 2020 season.

He later played for Club Sando and Montego Bay United.

== International career ==
Trimmingham made his international debut for Trinidad and Tobago in 2017.

His first international goal came during a 1–1 draw against Jamaica on 10 February 2025; he also scored an own goal during the match.

He was called-up to the 2025 CONCACAF Gold Cup in June 2025, but was replaced by Justin Garcia.

== Career statistics ==
=== International ===
As of match played 10 February 2025.

Appearances and goals by national team and year
National team	Year	Apps	Goals
Trinidad and Tobago	2017	1	0
Trinidad and Tobago	2018	0	0
Trinidad and Tobago	2019	0	0
Trinidad and Tobago	2020	0	0
Trinidad and Tobago	2021	1	0
Trinidad and Tobago	2022	0	0
Trinidad and Tobago	2023	3	0
Trinidad and Tobago	2024	3	0
Trinidad and Tobago	2025	2	1
Total		10	1

Scores and results list Trinidad and Tobago's goal tally first, score column indicates score after each Trimmingham goal.

List of international goals scored by Josiah Trimmingham
No.	Date	Venue	Cap	Opponent	Score	Result	Competition	Ref.
1.	10 February 2025	Sheikh Amri Abeid Stadium, Arusha, Tanzania	10	Jamaica	1–0	1–1	Friendly	
