= Gustavo Fernandes =

American soccer player

Personal information
- Date of birth: February 19, 1998 (age 28)
- Place of birth: West Babylon, New York, United States
- Height: 1.83 m (6 ft 0 in)
- Position: Defender

College career
Years	Team	Apps	(Gls)
2016–2017	Iowa Western Reivers		
2018–2019	Stony Brook Seawolves	32	(4)

Senior career*
Years	Team	Apps	(Gls)
2017	Tampa Bay Rowdies U23	11	(0)
2019	Ocean City Nor'easters	12	(0)
2020–2021	Forward Madison	26	(0)
2022–2023	North Carolina FC	57	(1)
2024	Chattanooga Red Wolves	14	(0)
2025	FC Naples	16	(0)
2026	South Georgia Tormenta		
- * Club domestic league appearances and goals

Gustavo Fernandes (born February 19, 1998) is an American professional soccer player who plays as a defender. His older brother Leo and his twin brother Gabriel also play soccer.

== Career ==
=== Forward Madison ===
After impressing during Forward Madison's February pre-season training camp, Fernandes signed for the club in March 2020. He made his league debut for the club on July 25, 2020, against North Texas.

=== North Carolina FC ===
On February 24, 2022, Fernandes moved to USL League One side North Carolina FC ahead of their upcoming 2022 season. He was part of the squad that won the League Championship in 2023.

=== Chattanooga Red Wolves ===
On January 11, 2024, Fernandes signed with USL League One side Chattanooga Red Wolves.

=== FC Naples ===
On 20 February 2025, Fernandes joined expansion club FC Naples in USL League One.

=== South Georgia Tormenta ===
On 27 January 2026, Fernandes signed for Tormenta FC for the 2026 season, although, after Tormenta announced that they were going on hiatus for the 2026 season on 23 February 12 days before the season started, Fernandes was forced to leave the team.
