= Néstor Merlo =

Argentine footballer

Personal information
- Full name: Néstor José Merlo
- Date of birth: 31 July 1960 (age 66)
- Place of birth: Buenos Aires, Argentina
- Position: Goalkeeper

Youth career
- 1977–1981: Huracán
- 1981–1982: Deportivo Español

Senior career*
Years	Team	Apps	(Gls)
1983	Deportivo Español		
1984–1986	Arsenal de Sarandí		
1986–1988	Chaco For Ever		
1988–1989	Boca Juniors	0	(0)
1989–1990	Chaco For Ever	26	(0)
1990–1993	Estudiantes de La Plata	23	(0)
1993–1995	Quilmes		
1995–1997	Chacarita Juniors		
1997–2000	Aldosivi		
2001–2002	San Martín de Burzaco		
- * Club domestic league appearances and goals as of 23:23, 3 June 2009 (UTC)

Néstor José Merlo (born 31 July 1960 in Buenos Aires) is a retired Argentine football goalkeeper.

Merlo began his playing career in 1983 in the Argentine 2nd division with Deportivo Español; he joined Arsenal de Sarandí in 1984 and then Chaco For Ever in 1986.

In 1988, Merlo was signed by Boca Juniors of the Primera División but he only ever played two games for the club in the Copa Libertadores before returning to Chaco For Ever after their promotion to the Primera in 1989.

Between 1990 and 1993, he played for Estudiantes de La Plata before returning to the 2nd division, where he played for Quilmes, Chacarita Juniors and Aldosivi. His last club was San Martín de Burzaco of Primera C Metropolitana between 2001 and 2002. Over his career, he played a total of 3550 league games for eight different clubs.
