= Louis Bennett II =

American soccer player

Personal information
- Date of birth: May 19, 1995 (age 31)
- Place of birth: Shorewood, Wisconsin, United States
- Height: 1.75 m (5 ft 9 in)
- Position: Defender

Team information
- Current team: Chicago House
- Number: 21

Youth career
- 2010–2012: Chicago Fire

College career
Years	Team	Apps	(Gls)
2013–2015	Marquette Golden Eagles	55	(9)

Senior career*
Years	Team	Apps	(Gls)
2014–2016	Chicago Fire U-23	20	(2)
2016–2017	Anorthosis Famagusta	0	(0)
2017	Swope Park Rangers	2	(0)
2017	MFK Vyškov	12	(1)
2019	Memphis 901	0	(0)
2019	→ Forward Madison (loan)	9	(0)
2020	Forward Madison	7	(0)
2021	Chicago House	6	(1)
- * Club domestic league appearances and goals as of October 10, 2021

Louis Bennett II (born May 19, 1995) is an American professional soccer player who last played as a defender for Chicago House AC in the National Independent Soccer Association.

== Career ==
=== Early career ===
Bennett played college soccer at Marquette University from 2013 and 2015. While at college, Bennett II played with Premier Development League side Chicago Fire U-23.

=== Professional ===
Bennett opted to forgo his senior college season to sign a three-year deal with Cypriot side Anorthosis Famagusta on August 12, 2016.

Bennett returned to the United States on February 17, 2017, when he signed with United Soccer League side Swope Park Rangers.

== Personal ==
Bennett is the son of former soccer player Louis Bennett, who is currently the head coach at Marquette University. Bennett II has dual American-British citizenship.
