= Philipp Marceta =

Austrian footballer

Personal information
- Date of birth: 5 January 1993 (age 33)
- Place of birth: Vienna, Austria
- Height: 1.88 m (6 ft 2 in)
- Position: Goalkeeper

Youth career
- 2001: Austria Wien
- 2001–2004: First Vienna
- 2004–2006: Stadlau
- 2006–2007: Obersiebenbrunn
- 2007–2010: Austria Wien

Senior career*
Years	Team	Apps	(Gls)
2010–2011	Ostbahn XI	0	(0)
2011	Mannersdorf	5	(0)
2011–2012	Lassee	2	(0)
2012–2013	Mannsdorf	13	(0)
2014	WAF Brigittenau	5	(0)
2014	SC/ESV Parndorf	2	(0)
2015	Athlone Town	0	(0)
2016	SC/ESV Parndorf	0	(0)
2016–2017	Ritzing	18	(0)
2019–2020	SV Heimstetten	1	(0)
2020	Forward Madison	8	(0)
- * Club domestic league appearances and goals as of 16:39, 16 January 2022 (UTC)

Philipp Marceta (born 5 January 1993) is an Austrian footballer who plays as a goalkeeper.

== Career ==
=== SV Heimstetten ===
Prior to the 2019-20 season, Marceta signed with Regionalliga club SV Heimstetten. During his only season with the club, Marceta made just one league appearance, playing the entirety of a 2–1 away defeat to Rain am Lech.

=== Forward Madison ===
During MLS pre-season, Marceta went on trial with Seattle Sounders FC. However, he wasn't offered a contract. In March 2020, Marceta signed with USL League One club Forward Madison. He made his league debut for the club on 25 July 2020, playing the entirety of a 2–1 away defeat to North Texas SC.
