= Adam Grinwis =

American soccer player

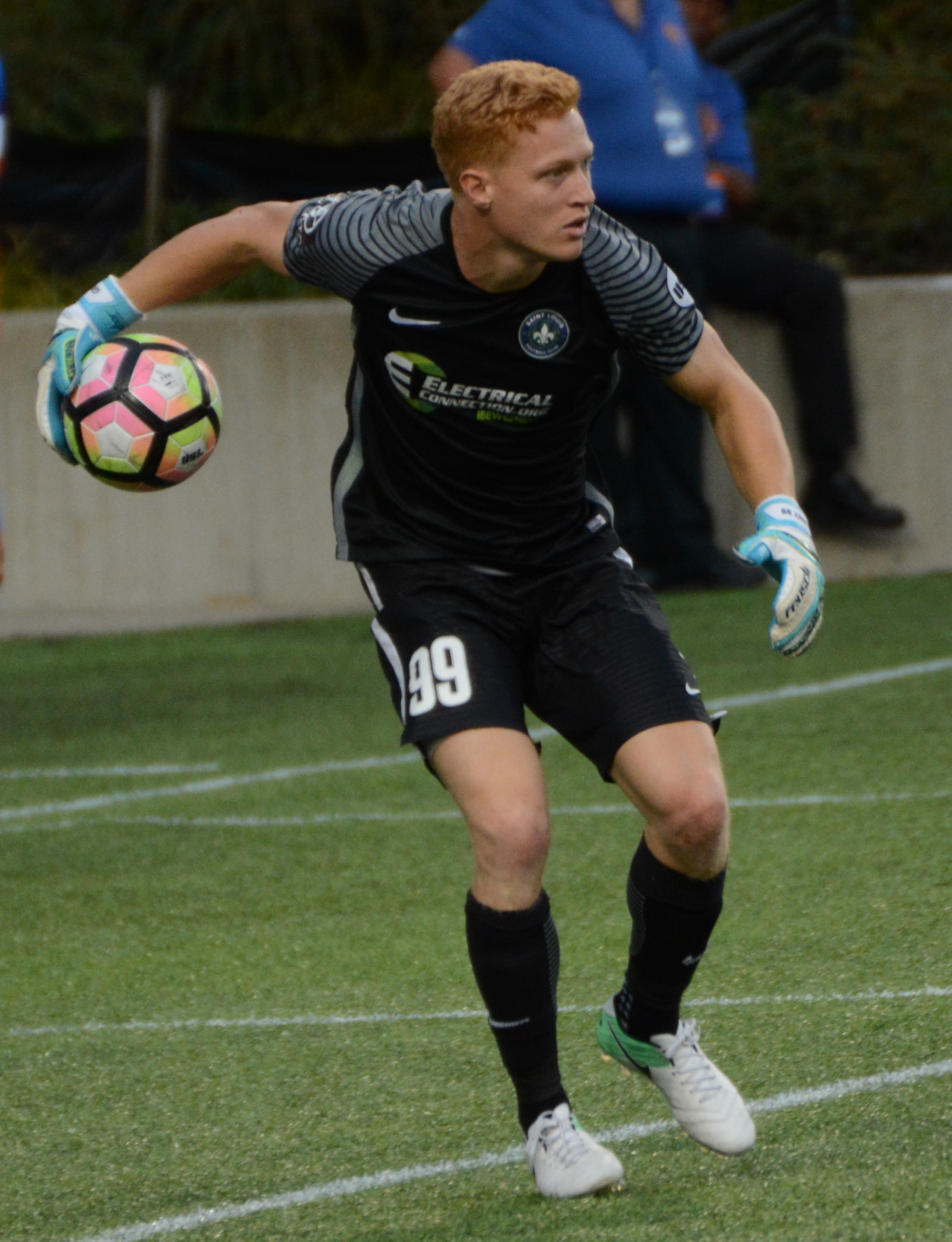
- Grinwis with Saint Louis FC in 2017

Personal information
- Full name: Adam Robert Grinwis
- Date of birth: April 21, 1992 (age 34)
- Place of birth: Ada, Michigan, U.S.
- Height: 6 ft 2 in (1.88 m)
- Position: Goalkeeper

College career
| Years | Team | Apps | (Gls) |
| 2010–2014 | Michigan Wolverines | 68 | (0) |

Senior career*
| Years | Team | Apps | (Gls) |
| 2012–2014 | Michigan Bucks | 29 | (0) |
| 2015–2016 | Rochester Rhinos | 20 | (0) |
| 2017 | Saint Louis FC | 14 | (0) |
| 2018–2019 | Orlando City | 5 | (0) |
| 2018 | → Real Monarchs (loan) | 4 | (0) |
| 2020 | Sacramento Republic | 4 | (0) |
| 2021–2023 | Orlando City | 2 | (0) |
| 2022 | → Orlando City B (loan) | 4 | (0) |
| 2024 | Charleston Battery | 30 | (0) |
| Total | | 112 | (0) |
- * Club domestic league appearances and goals as of November 25, 2024

Adam Robert Grinwis (born April 21, 1992) is an American former professional soccer player who played as a goalkeeper.

== Career ==
=== College and youth ===
Grinwis attended Forest Hills Central High School, where he was a four-year all-conference selection.

He played college soccer at the University of Michigan between 2010 and 2014, including a red-shirted year in 2010. For the 2012 season, he was selected to the All-Big Ten Second Team and the Big Ten All-Tournament Team.

Grinwis also appeared for USL PDL club Michigan Bucks between 2012 and 2014. For the 2012 PDL season, he was named PDL Goalkeeper of the Year and PDL Rookie of the Year. He was named MVP of the 2014 PDL Championship Game.

=== Professional ===
Grinwis signed with United Soccer League club Rochester Rhinos on March 26, 2015, and then with Saint Louis FC on March 5, 2017.

On January 5, 2018, Grinwis signed with MLS side Orlando City SC.

On August 17, 2018, it was announced that Real Monarchs had acquired Grinwis on loan for the remainder of the 2018 USL season. He made his debut for the Monarchs, 48 hours after he arrived in Utah, in a 3–2 victory over the Tulsa Rughnecks. He made four appearances in total before being recalled by Orlando in September.

On September 22, 2018, he made his Orlando debut against Houston Dynamo as manager James O'Connor continued to assess his options at the position. He kept only the team's second clean sheet of the year in a 0–0 draw and was voted man of the match. After missing the next game through injury, Grinwis came straight back into the team the week after and retained the starting job until the end of the season.

Despite having not yet played in MLS in 2019, Grinwis was Orlando City's starting goalkeeper during their U.S. Open Cup run that saw them reach the semi-finals for the first time with Grinwis saving two penalties in a shoot-out against New York City FC in the quarterfinals. On November 21, 2019, it was announced Grinwis had his contract option for the 2020 season declined by Orlando as part of the end-of-season roster decisions.

Grinwis signed with USL Championship side Sacramento Republic for the 2020 season on January 21, 2020. Grinwis began the season as starter, making his debut in a 1–1 draw with FC Tulsa on March 7. Five days later, the season was put on hold due to the COVID-19 pandemic. Following the resumption of play in July, Grinwis played the opening three games before suffering a knee injury, keeping him out for the rest of the season. He did not have his contract option exercised and was released as part of the team's end of season roster moves.

On July 31, 2021, Grinwis re-signed with Orlando City for the remainder of the 2021 season with a club option to extend for 2022. With Pedro Gallese on international duty, Brandon Austin recalled by Tottenham at the end of his loan and Mason Stajduhar injured, Grinwis became the fourth goalkeeper to appear, and subsequently win a game, for Orlando City in 2021 after making his second debut for the club on September 4 in a 3–2 victory at home to reigning MLS Cup champions Columbus Crew. Although he made no appearances for the first team during 2022, Grinwis played four times for Orlando City B in MLS Next Pro, keeping no shutouts and conceding 13 times. In December 2023, as part of the end of season roster moves, it was announced Grinwis had his option declined and was released as a free agent.

Grinwis joined Charleston Battery of the USL Championship on January 18, 2024. Grinwis retired following the 2024 season.

== Career statistics ==
=== Club ===
As of September 11, 2022

| Club | Season | League | | | Cup | | Playoffs | | Total | |
| Club | Season | Division | Apps | Goals | Apps | Goals | Apps | Goals | Apps | Goals |
|---|---|---|---|---|---|---|---|---|---|---|
| Rochester Rhinos | 2015 | USL | 7 | 0 | 0 | 0 | 0 | 0 | 7 | 0 |
| Rochester Rhinos | 2016 | USL | 13 | 0 | 0 | 0 | – | | 13 | 0 |
| Rochester Rhinos | Total | | 20 | 0 | 0 | 0 | 0 | 0 | 20 | 0 |
| Saint Louis FC | 2017 | USL | 14 | 0 | 1 | 0 | – | | 15 | 0 |
| Orlando City | 2018 | MLS | 5 | 0 | 0 | 0 | – | | 5 | 0 |
| Orlando City | 2019 | MLS | 0 | 0 | 4 | 0 | – | | 4 | 0 |
| Orlando City | Total | | 5 | 0 | 4 | 0 | 0 | 0 | 9 | 0 |
| Real Monarchs (loan) | 2018 | USL | 4 | 0 | 0 | 0 | – | | 4 | 0 |
| Sacramento Republic | 2020 | USL Championship | 4 | 0 | 0 | 0 | 0 | 0 | 4 | 0 |
| Orlando City | 2021 | MLS | 2 | 0 | 0 | 0 | 0 | 0 | 2 | 0 |
| Orlando City | 2022 | MLS | 0 | 0 | 0 | 0 | 0 | 0 | 0 | 0 |
| Orlando City | Total | | 2 | 0 | 0 | 0 | 0 | 0 | 2 | 0 |
| Orlando City B (loan) | 2022 | MLS Next Pro | 4 | 0 | – | | – | | 4 | 0 |
| Career total | | | 53 | 0 | 5 | 0 | 0 | 0 | 57 | 0 |
