= Jonathan Suárez =

Jonathan Suárez may refer to:

- Jonathan Suárez (BMX rider), Venezuelan professional BMX cyclist
- Jonathan Suárez (soccer), American soccer player
