= Brandon Austin =

Soccer player (born 1999)

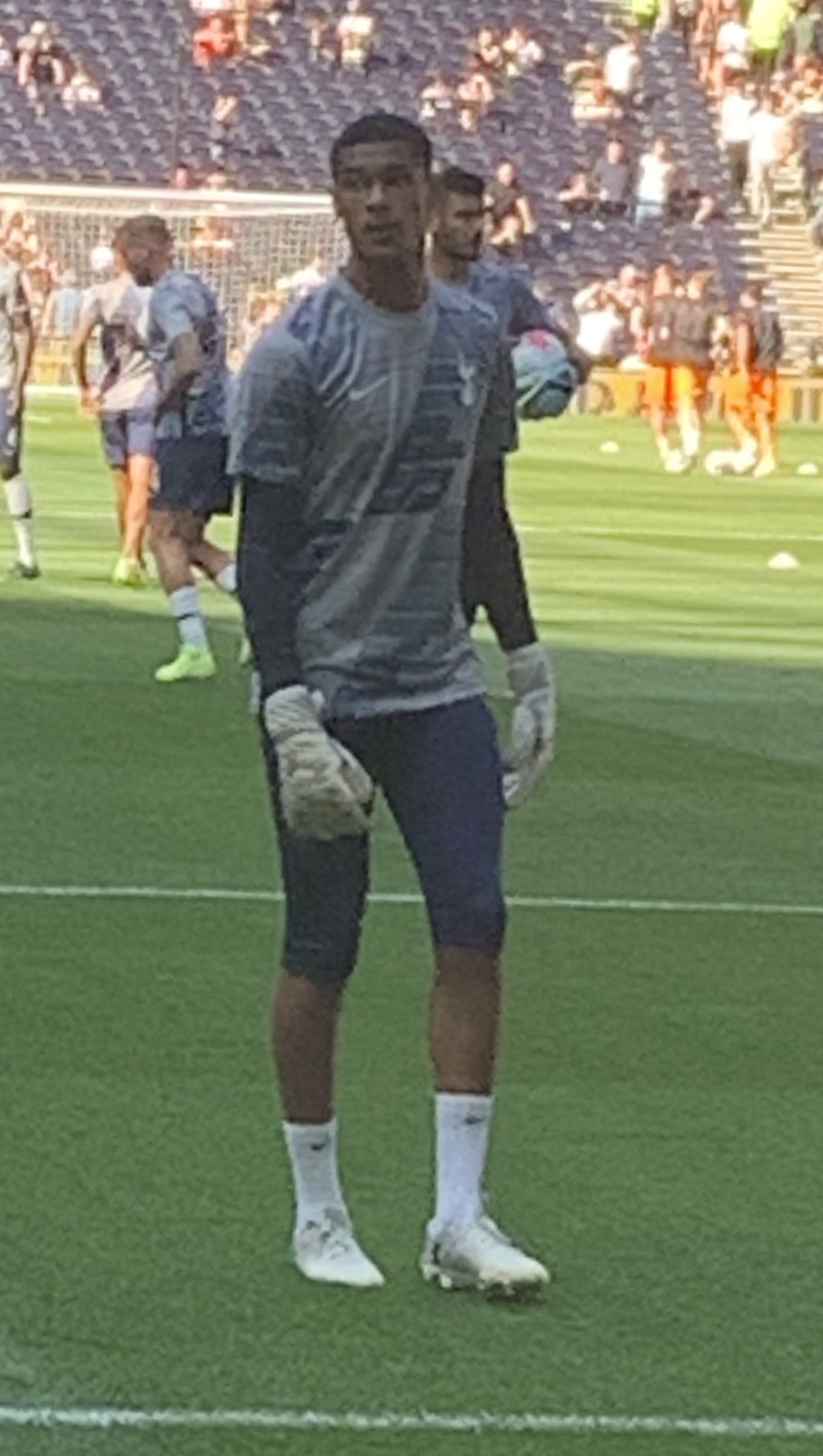
- Austin with Tottenham Hotspur in 2019

Personal information
- Full name: Brandon Anthony Austin
- Date of birth: January 8, 1999 (age 27)
- Place of birth: Hemel Hempstead, England
- Height: 6 ft 2 in (1.88 m)
- Position: Goalkeeper

Team information
- Current team: Tottenham Hotspur
- Number: 40

Youth career
- Chelsea
- 2007–2019: Tottenham Hotspur

Senior career*
Years	Team	Apps	(Gls)
2019–	Tottenham Hotspur	1	(0)
2019	→ Viborg FF (loan)	14	(0)
2021	→ Orlando City (loan)	5	(0)

International career
2017	United States U18	1	(0)
- * Club domestic league appearances and goals as of 14:53, January 4, 2025 (UTC)

Brandon Anthony Austin (born January 8, 1999) is a professional soccer player who plays as a goalkeeper for Premier League club Tottenham Hotspur.

Born in England, he made an appearance for the United States under-18 national team, but has most recently been called up for the England under-21 national team.

== Club career ==
=== Tottenham Hotspur ===
After playing with Watford and Chelsea as a young child, Austin joined Tottenham Hotspur in 2007. In his first main year with the club he was limited to five appearances with the under-18 team. The following year he made 16 appearances, more than any other under-18 goalkeeper at the club during the 2016–17 season. In the same season he also made two appearances for the under-23 in the Premier League 2 and a further appearance in the 2016–17 UEFA Youth League.

After travelling with the Spurs first-team during the team's 2017 preseason tour of the United States, he made the permanent step up to under-23 level for the 2017–18 season. During the season he made two appearances during the 2017–18 EFL Trophy against EFL clubs Luton Town and AFC Wimbledon and was a key part of the team's run to the 2017–18 UEFA Youth League quarter-finals before being eliminated by Monaco on penalties.

During the 2019–20 season, Austin travelled with the first-team as the emergency third goalkeeper for a few weeks. He was named as a first-team substitute for the first time on October 19, 2019, for Spurs' Premier League match against Watford as a backup to Paulo Gazzaniga following an injury to Hugo Lloris and ahead of fellow academy team-mate Alfie Whiteman. He signed a new two-and-a-half-year contract with Spurs in December 2019.

In total, Austin made 78 appearances in the Tottenham youth system, recording 12 clean sheets and captaining the club's under-19 side during the 2018–19 UEFA Youth League.

==== Loan to Viborg FF ====
Austin spent the second half of the 2019–20 season on loan to Danish second-tier side Viborg FF, appearing in 14 games and recording one clean sheet.

==== Loan to Orlando City ====
On January 22, 2021, Austin was loaned to MLS side Orlando City SC ahead of the 2021 season for six months with an option to extend the loan another six months. Having been an unused substitute in the first seven games of the season, Austin made his club debut on June 19 in a league game against Toronto FC in place of regular starter Pedro Gallese who was away on international duty at the 2021 Copa América. Orlando won the game 3–2. He kept his first clean sheet in the following match, a 5–0 win over San Jose Earthquakes. He played all five games during Gallese's absence, keeping one clean sheet and conceding eight goals. With Gallese out injured, Austin was a substitute on July 30 behind Mason Stajduhar who was making his debut more than five years after signing with the club. The following day it was announced Austin had returned to Tottenham following the conclusion of his initial six-month loan contract.

==== Return to Spurs ====
On May 28, 2024, Austin signed a new long-term contract. On January 4, 2025, after nine years at the club, Austin made his first team debut for Tottenham, starting against Newcastle United in the Premier League, which ended in a 2–1 defeat with Austin being awarded man of the match.

== International career ==
Austin is eligible to represent England, the United States, and the US Virgin Islands. In April 2017, he made his debut for the United States under-18 against Slovakia in the Slovakia Cup. In the same year he was named as the England under-19 standby goalkeeper for that summer's European championships. He earned his first call-up to the England under-21 team in October 2019.

== Personal life ==
Austin was born in Hemel Hempstead and attended Cavendish School. Austin's father is former England international basketball player Neville Austin, an integral part of the 1996–97 BBL winning London Towers team.

== Career statistics ==
As of match played January 30, 2025

Appearances and goals by club, season and competition
Club	Season	League			National cup		League cup		Continental		Other		Total	
Club	Season	Division	Apps	Goals	Apps	Goals	Apps	Goals	Apps	Goals	Apps	Goals	Apps	Goals
Tottenham Hotspur U21	2017–18	—			—		—		—		2 (Note: Appearances in EFL Trophy)	0	2	0
Tottenham Hotspur U21	2018–19	—			—		—		—		2	0	2	0
Tottenham Hotspur U21	Total		0	0	0	0	0	0	0	0	4	0	4	0
Tottenham Hotspur	2019–20	Premier League	0	0	0	0	0	0	0	0	—		0	0
Tottenham Hotspur	2020–21	Premier League	0	0	0	0	0	0	0	0	—		0	0
Tottenham Hotspur	2021–22	Premier League	0	0	0	0	0	0	0	0	—		0	0
Tottenham Hotspur	2022–23	Premier League	0	0	0	0	0	0	0	0	—		0	0
Tottenham Hotspur	2023–24	Premier League	0	0	0	0	0	0	—		—		0	0
Tottenham Hotspur	2024–25	Premier League	1	0	0	0	0	0	2 (Note: Appearances in UEFA Europa League)	0	—		3	0
Tottenham Hotspur	2025–26	Premier League	0	0	0	0	0	0	0	0	0	0	0	0
Tottenham Hotspur	Total		1	0	0	0	0	0	2	0	0	0	3	0
Viborg FF (loan)	2019–20	Danish 1st Division	14	0	—		—		—		—		14	0
Orlando City (loan)	2021	MLS	5	0	—		—		—		—		5	0
Career total			20	0	0	0	4	0	2	0	0	0	26	0

== Honors ==
Tottenham Hotspur

- UEFA Europa League: 2024–25
