= Mason Stajduhar =

American soccer player (born 1997)

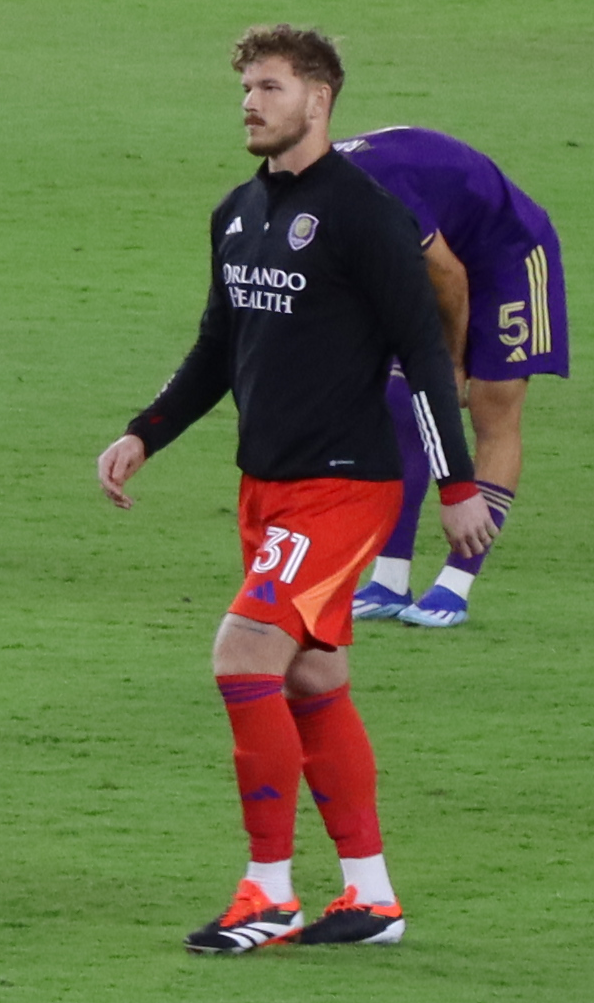
- Stajduhar with Orlando City in 2024

Personal information
- Full name: Mason James Stajduhar
- Date of birth: December 2, 1997 (age 28)
- Place of birth: Salem, Massachusetts, U.S.
- Height: 6 ft 2 in (1.88 m)
- Position: Goalkeeper

Team information
- Current team: Real Salt Lake
- Number: 31

Youth career
- 2013–2015: Orlando City

Senior career*
Years	Team	Apps	(Gls)
2016–2025	Orlando City	16	(0)
2017–2023	→ Orlando City B (loan)	9	(0)
2016	→ Louisville City (loan)	0	(0)
2019	→ Tulsa Roughnecks (loan)	17	(0)
2020	→ New York City FC (loan)	0	(0)
2025–	Real Salt Lake	1	(0)
2025	→ Real Monarchs (loan)	2	(0)
2026	→ Las Vegas Lights (loan)	4	(0)

International career^{‡}
2015	United States U18		
2015–2016	United States U20		
- * Club domestic league appearances and goals as of 02:12, August 23, 2026 (UTC) ‡ National team caps and goals as of January 4, 2016

Mason James Stajduhar (born December 2, 1997) is an American professional soccer player who plays as a goalkeeper for Major League Soccer club Real Salt Lake.

== Club career ==
=== Orlando City ===
On November 9, 2015, Orlando City announced the signing of Stajduhar to a Homegrown contract. He became the club's fourth homegrown player. Prior to his signing, Stajduhar had been part of the club's U.S. Soccer Development Academy Program and was named to the under-18 USSDA East Conference Best XI.

Stajduhar was loaned to USL side Louisville City on April 30, 2016, but didn't make an appearance for the club.

Stajduhar was loaned out again on March 15, 2019, to USL Championship side Tulsa Roughnecks for their 2019 season. He made his professional debut on March 29 in a 2–1 win over RGV Toros. He was briefly recalled by Orlando City on June 24 owing to Greg Ranjitsingh's participation in the 2019 CONCACAF Gold Cup and an injury to Adam Grinwis before returning to Tulsa in July. In July 2019, Stajduhar was selected to take part in the MLS Homegrown Game. Having had his original contract option declined at the end of the season, Stajduhar renegotiated a new one-year deal with Orlando ahead of the 2020 season.

On December 14, 2020, it was announced Stajduhar had signed for New York City FC on loan as an emergency backup goalkeeper with the team competing in the final stages of the 2020 CONCACAF Champions League being held at Orlando's Exploria Stadium. Regular starter Sean Johnson was not permitted to travel after being ruled a close contact with someone who tested positive for COVID-19 while backup Brad Stuver left the club with his contract expiring that month. Stajduhar was an unused substitute behind usual third-string goalkeeper Luis Barraza as New York City lost 4–0 to Tigres UANL.

On July 30, 2021, 2,090 days after signing his first senior contract with the club, Stajduhar made his Orlando City debut, starting in an MLS game against Atlanta United. He was credited with one save during the game but notably conceded a goal to Josef Martínez in the opening 47 seconds and a long-range goal from Marcelino Moreno during Orlando's come from behind 3–2 victory.

On June 22, 2024, Stajduhar broke a club record for the most saves in a single match when he recorded 11 saves against Chicago Fire in a 4–2 win, breaking Joe Bendik's record of 10 saves against Sporting Kansas City in 2016.

==== Season-ending injury ====
On June 28, 2024, in a match against New York City FC, Stajduhar broke his right tibia and fibula while challenging for the ball when he collided with NYCFC player Malachi Jones, who also suffered a broken tibia and fibula. The NYCFC attack in which the players were injured began when Jones received the ball when he was in an offside position before running towards goal with the ball, prompting Stajduhar to slide out of the penalty box to try and intercept him, and both players broke their right legs when they collided. Orlando City teammate Dagur Dan Þórhallsson described how he heard a clicking sound when the players collided and then how he saw "his leg was just dangling" before going to the stands and closing his eyes. Stajduhar was replaced by Javier Otero, marking the goalkeeper's MLS debut, and required hospitalization. Following the match Orlando City head coach Óscar Pareja criticized the current offsides rule saying that "they need to get better at this ruling" when the "offside is very obvious" in order to avoid unnecessary injuries like Stajduhar's. Stajduhar's injuries resulted in him undergoing surgery and him being placed on the season-ending injury list.

=== Real Salt Lake ===
On January 15, 2025, Stajduhar was traded to Real Salt Lake in exchange for $50,000 in General Allocation Money (GAM) and Real Salt Lake's natural second-round draft pick in the 2026 MLS SuperDraft and up to $150,000 in further GAM if certain performance-based metrics were met. On June 11, Stajduhar started and played a full match for Real Salt Lake's reserve affiliate Real Monarchs in a 2–1 victory over Tacoma Defiance. After the conclusion of the 2025 season, Stajduhar had his contract extended.

On May 12, 2026, Stajduhar joined USL Championship club Las Vegas Lights on loan for the remainder of Las Vegas' 2026 season. However, Stajduhar was recalled by Real Salt Lake later that year on July 2. Stajduhar made his Real Salt Lake debut against his former club, Orlando City, on August 22 as part of a heavily rotated lineup. Real Salt Lake lost 2–1 as Orlando City came from behind, with Stajduhar only making one save during the match.

== International career ==
=== Youth ===
On April 22, 2015, Stajduhar was called up a U-18 training camp in Bosnia and Herzegovina for two matches against the country's under-18 side and a match against Herzegovinian club Široki Brijeg.

Later that year in November, Stajduhar was called up to the U-20 squad by Tab Ramos for the Four Nations Tournament in Germany against Germany, Scotland, and Mexico. On January 4, 2016, Stajduhar joined another U-20 training camp, this time in Miami against local competition.

== Personal life ==
On November 18, 2017, it was announced that Stajduhar had been diagnosed with localized Ewing sarcoma, a form of bone cancer, and had begun to undergo chemotherapy. Team doctors found a cancerous lesion during a routine exam. Having continued to train throughout his treatment, Stajduhar completed his chemotherapy and returned to playing in full with Orlando City on June 20, 2018.

On April 28, 2024, Stajduhar and his wife Tatiana were arrested on disorderly conduct charges after they allegedly refused to leave the Tier Nightclub in Downtown Orlando. Club bouncers alleged the pair were intoxicated and that they had yelled at a woman near the club entrance before the couple were removed. Stajduhar allegedly then tried to re-enter the club with him later claiming that the bouncers had struck Tatiana and he wanted to make sure that she was okay before the pair were handed over to Orlando Police Department officers and arrested, with Tatiana allegedly pushing an officer to the ground in the process.

== Career statistics ==
=== Club ===
As of August 22, 2026

Appearances and goals by club, season and competition
Club	Season	League			National cup		Continental		Other		Playoffs		Total	
Club	Season	Division	Apps	Goals	Apps	Goals	Apps	Goals	Apps	Goals	Apps	Goals	Apps	Goals
Orlando City	2016	Major League Soccer	0	0	0	0	—		—		—		0	0
Orlando City	2017	Major League Soccer	0	0	0	0	—		—		—		0	0
Orlando City	2018	Major League Soccer	0	0	0	0	—		—		—		0	0
Orlando City	2019	Major League Soccer	0	0	0	0	—		—		—		0	0
Orlando City	2020	Major League Soccer	0	0	—		—		—		0	0	0	0
Orlando City	2021	Major League Soccer	5	0	—		—		1 (Note: Appearances in Leagues Cup)	0	0	0	6	0
Orlando City	2022	Major League Soccer	2	0	3	0	—		0	0	0	0	5	0
Orlando City	2023	Major League Soccer	4	0	1	0	0	0	0	0	0	0	5	0
Orlando City	2024	Major League Soccer	5	0	—		1	0	0	0	0	0	6	0
Orlando City	Total		16	0	4	0	1	0	1	0	0	0	22	0
Louisville City (loan)	2016	USL Championship	0	0	0	0	—		—		0	0	0	0
Orlando City B	2017	USL Championship	0	0	—		—		—		—		0	0
Orlando City B	2020	USL League One	3	0	—		—		—		—		3	0
Orlando City B	2022	MLS Next Pro	3	0	—		—		—		—		3	0
Orlando City B	2023	MLS Next Pro	3	0	—		—		—		—		3	0
Orlando City B	Total		9	0	0	0	0	0	0	0	0	0	9	0
Tulsa Roughnecks (loan)	2019	USL Championship	17	0	1	0	—		—		—		18	0
New York City FC (loan)	2020	Major League Soccer	0	0	0	0	0	0	—		0	0	0	0
Real Salt Lake	2025	Major League Soccer	0	0	—		0	0	0	0	—		0	0
Real Salt Lake	2026	Major League Soccer	1	0	—		—		0	0	—		1	0
Real Salt Lake	Total		1	0	0	0	0	0	0	0	0	0	1	0
Real Monarchs (loan)	2025	MLS Next Pro	2	0	—		—		—		—		2	0
Las Vegas Lights (loan)	2026	USL Championship	4	0	—		—		2 (Note: Appearances in USL Cup)	0	—		6	0
Career total			48	0	5	0	1	0	3	0	0	0	57	0

== Honors ==
Orlando City

- U.S. Open Cup: 2022
