= 2021 Orlando City SC season =

Season of American association football team

Orlando City SC
2021 season
- Manager: Óscar Pareja
- Stadium: Exploria Stadium
- MLS: Conference: 6th Overall: 10th
- MLS Cup Playoffs: First round
- U.S. Open Cup: Canceled
- Leagues Cup: Quarter-finals
- Top goalscorer: League: Daryl Dike and Nani (10); All: Daryl Dike (11)
- Highest home attendance: MLS: 19,009 (July 3 vs. New York Red Bulls)
- Lowest home attendance: MLS: 11,503 (April 17 vs. Atlanta United FC); All: 7,338 (August 12 vs. Santos Laguna, Leagues Cup)
- Average home league attendance: 15,644
- Biggest win: ORL 5–0 SJ (Jun. 22)
- Biggest defeat: NYC 5–0 ORL (Jul. 25)
Home colors	Away colors

The 2021 Orlando City SC season was the club's 11th season of existence in Orlando and seventh season as a Major League Soccer franchise, the top-flight league in the United States soccer league system. There was no U.S. Open Cup for the second consecutive year as a result of the COVID-19 pandemic but the team did take part in the Leagues Cup for the first time.

== Season review ==
=== Pre-season ===
Unlike previous seasons, Orlando had relatively little player turnover and instead focused on retaining the core of the squad following the club's first playoff appearance in 2020. Four permanent transfers were made in December 2020, all purchase options of players previously on loan with Orlando: Antônio Carlos, Rodrigo Schlegel, Andrés Perea and Alexander Alvarado. Six players did not have their options exercised and were released. Most notable of these was Designated Player Dom Dwyer who had been limited to two appearances in 2020 due to a knee injury. He had returned to Orlando in July 2017 for a then MLS-record $1.6 million in allocation money. The club also acquired two loan players to provide depth in key positions: goalkeeper Brandon Austin on loan from Tottenham Hotspur and left-back Jonathan Suárez from Querétaro although the latter was arrested and had his loan terminated prior to the start of preseason. Having released Dwyer and allowed Daryl Dike to join Barnsley initially on a short-term loan in January, Orlando reinforced their forward options by announcing the free agent signing of former Golden Boy winner and Brazil international Alexandre Pato on February 13, before also securing the signing of Dutch winger Silvester van der Water from Heracles Almelo, having unsuccessfully pursued him the previous September.

With the addition of Austin FC in 2021, MLS held an Expansion Draft on December 15, 2020. Orlando had 13 players exposed. Kamal Miller was selected by Austin who immediately traded him to the Montreal Impact in exchange for $225,000 in General Allocation Money and a first round pick (11th) in the 2021 MLS SuperDraft. It was the second time an Orlando player had been taken in an expansion draft after Mikey Ambrose was selected in 2016.

On January 21, Orlando made four selections in the 2021 MLS SuperDraft including three in the first round. Derek Dodson and Rio Hope-Gund were both signed but neither appeared during the season. Brandon Hackenberg returned to college to exhaust his eligibility before later signing with the relaunched Orlando City B in MLS Next Pro ahead of the 2022 season.

On February 5, MLS and the MLS Players Association agreed to a new Collective Bargaining Agreement (CBA) through 2027 after extending the deadline by a day to avoid a lockout. The primary issues negotiated were increased player spending, expanded free agency, and more charter travel. The league had invoked a force majeure clause in late December 2020 to reopen negotiations over the current CBA, citing ongoing uncertainty because of the COVID-19 pandemic. Following the CBA's ratification, MLS announced it had pushed back the start of the regular season to April 17 due to the extended labor negotiations.

On March 23, Orlando were selected as one of four MLS teams to compete in the 2021 Leagues Cup as one of the top two teams from each conference not scheduled to take part in the Champions League. It will be the club's first time in the competition.

On April 5, U.S. Soccer and MLS announced it would be trialing the new IFAB approved concussion substitutes rule allowing for two additional substitutions in each match to be used for players with suspected concussions. The new rule was implemented on top of the increase from three to five "normal" substitutes carried over from the 2020 season.

=== April ===
Orlando opened the season on April 17 at home to Atlanta United FC, notably missing starters Mauricio Pereyra through suspension, Robin Jansson and João Moutinho due to injury, and Daryl Dike still on loan. Marque offseason signing Alexandre Pato made his debut starting in the opener but was forced off injured in the 80th minute with Silvester van der Water debuting as a substitute in his place. A goalless draw preserved Orlando's unbeaten record on matchday one since joining MLS in 2015. Orlando's opening road game of the season was against Sporting Kansas City, one of only two scheduled Western Conference opponents of the regular season, on April 23. Having conceded first when Dániel Sallói caught Pedro Gallese playing out from the back before setting up Gianluca Busio to score on the stroke of halftime, the Lions battled back in the second half to tie courtesy of a Nani backheel goal. The game also saw both teams have goals correctly ruled out for offside following VAR reviews.

=== May ===
Orlando's first win of the season came in gameweek three as FC Cincinnati visited Exploria Stadium. Tesho Akindele opened the scoring of a dominant 3–0 victory in a franchise record 31 seconds. In total, the Lions recorded 23 shots. The second goal of the game, scored by Nani chopping back on his left, sitting a defender down in the process and curling the ball into the top corner from 22 yards was voted MLS goal of the week. On May 8, Nani scored for the third consecutive game as Orlando City took the lead at home to New York City FC before João Moutinho, who had been called on as a halftime substitute to make his first appearance of the season following an injury to Ruan, conceded the game-tying penalty of a 1–1 draw. The club set a new record on May 16 with a 1–0 victory away to D.C. United as the five game unbeaten streak was the Lions' longest such run to start a season. Mauricio Pereyra scored the only goal of the game in the 7th minute. From then on Orlando defended deep, conceding shots but D.C. only registered one on target. Their frustrations eventually boiled over as home fans threw debris on to the field and players clashed in stoppage time. Hernán Losada was particularly embittered by Orlando's tactics stating: "The way where you dominate the whole game, the opponent doesn't know what else to do to neutralize the game, to waste time, to park the bus. They didn't want to play after they scored the goal." The result left Orlando as one of three remaining unbeaten teams in the league. Nani retrospectively received a two-game suspension following a review by the MLS Disciplinary Committee that deemed he had made "unwanted physical contact" with the referee while trying to prevent further clashing between the two sets of players in stoppage time. The MLS Players Association issued a rebuke condemning the decision for "lacking integrity." On May 17, it was announced Exploria Stadium would be open to full capacity in June 2021, the first time since the 2020 season opener on February 29. February signing Silvester van der Water made his first start in place of the suspended Nani on 22 May 2021. He provided his first MLS assist for Akindele on the only goal of the game and was named player of the match as Orlando beat Toronto FC 1–0 to extend their unbeaten start to the season to six. The unbeaten start to the season ended on May 29 with a 2–1 defeat on the road to New York Red Bulls. Despite the good form, Orlando struggled to hold possession and came under persistent pressure, conceding twice within an hour. The Lions looked a better goal threat following the introduction of van der Water who came off the bench to score his first goal in the 84th minute but missed a clear opportunity to equalize shortly after. The game was also notable for the senior debut of Michael Halliday who started the game, setting a new record as the youngest first-team player at 18 years, 127 days, beating Tommy Redding's record set in August 2015 by 70 days.

=== June ===
Major League Soccer scheduled a three-week break at the start of June during the FIFA international window which included the 2021 CONCACAF Nations League Finals. Having returned from his loan spell at Barnsley, Daryl Dike was the only Orlando player involved in the competition. He attended the pre-tournament training camp for the United States and, although he did not make the final roster, continued to travel and train with the squad as the United States won the inaugural edition of the tournament. He scored his first international goal later in the international window on June 9, 2021, in a 4–0 friendly win over Costa Rica at Rio Tinto Stadium. Sebas Méndez and Pedro Gallese were both called up to Ecuador and Peru respectively for the 2021 Copa América contested in Brazil from June 13 to July 10, meaning they could both be absent for as many as five Orlando games. On June 15, Thomas Williams became the club's 11th homegrown signing and the youngest ever first-team signing at 16 years, 304 days, surpassing the record set by Tommy Redding in 2014. In the absence of Gallese, loanee Brandon Austin made his debut against Toronto FC on June 19, becoming the youngest goalkeeper to make an appearance for the club. Despite a fast start, with Akindele scoring in the opening minute for the second time in six games and Nani doubling the lead seven minutes later, the teams went in at the break level as Toronto, who were using Exploria Stadium as a temporary base as travel to and from Canada remained restricted, battled back through Ayo Akinola and Jonathan Osorio goals. Daryl Dike made his return as a second-half substitute before Júnior Urso sealed a late and emotional win for Orlando which the players and Óscar Pareja dedicated to teammate Rodrigo Schlegel who had returned to Argentina the previous month after his father had contracted COVID-19 and passed away the week prior. The game was played behind closed doors as a designated Toronto home game in attempt to protect homefield advantage. A midweek matchup three days later, delayed twice by lightning, saw Orlando equal their record margin of victory, a 5–0 victory against San Jose Earthquakes. Dike scored a brace on his first start of the season as did Benji Michel, the first multiple goal game of his professional career. Orlando's only other five goal winning margin to date had come in a 6–1 win over New England in September 2017. Orlando ended the month with their third game in seven days, a rivalry match against Inter Miami CF. Orlando came back from a Gonzalo Higuaín goal to win 2–1 as Chris Mueller volleyed in his first goal of the season to tie the game up before Nani struck the winner from distance in the 80th minute.

=== July ===
On July 1, Dike was named to the final 23-man United States roster for the 2021 CONCACAF Gold Cup, Orlando's sole representative in the original squads although Tesho Akindele was called up by Canada at the quarter-final stage on July 23 as an injury replacement for Ayo Akinola. Exploria Stadium was used as a host venue for six of the tournament's group games. Orlando City started July with back to back defeats, first losing to New York Red Bulls for a second time on the year as Fábio struck a late winner to hand Orlando their first home defeat of the season. Oscar Pareja fielded a heavily rotated side on the road four days later as Chicago Fire FC came from behind to win 3–1. Andrés Perea scored Orlando's only goal of the game, his first for the club, as Sebas Méndez made his return from the Copa América as a substitute. It marked the first time in Pareja's 19-month tenure that Orlando City lost consecutive regular season games having last done so under James O'Connor in August 2019. The winless streak extended to three with a 1–1 draw as Orlando ventured north to play Toronto FC for the third time in 13 games. The game was Toronto's first on Canadian soil since March 7, 2020, following the easing of travel restrictions. Jozy Altidore opened the scoring as a second-half substitute on his return to the side having been exiled from the team by recently sacked head coach Chris Armas in late-May. The lead lasted five minutes before Nani scored the equalizer from the spot as Orlando were awarded a penalty on a VAR review after goalkeeper Alex Bono had taken out Benji Michel. On July 21, the sale of Orlando City SC and related soccer assets by Flavio Augusto da Silva, who took over in 2013, was completed. Zygi, Leonard and Mark Wilf became the new majority owners with the DeVos family, led by Dan DeVos, entering as minority owners. The combined value of the deal was estimated at $400–450 million. On the same day it was announced Chris Mueller had signed a pre-contract agreement with an unnamed European club (later revealed to be Hibernian of the Scottish Premiership) and would be leaving upon the expiry of his contract at the end of the 2021 season. Having dropped to fourth in the East as a result of Nashville's draw the previous day, Orlando City hosted reigning Supporters' Shield winners Philadelphia Union who sat one point and two places above them in the standings before kickoff on July 22. Having opened a two-goal lead courtesy of Michel and Perea, Kacper Przybyłko struck back in the 68th minute to set up a frantic finish. With four added minutes originally signaled, a concussion check on Orlando's Robin Jansson extended the time further as Orlando closed out the win with Kyle Smith making a 98th-minute goal line clearance, throwing himself in front of a point-blank Quinn Sullivan strike to block it with his face. The result meant Orlando leapfrogged Philadelphia into 2nd. Three days later the team was handed the biggest defeat under Pareja to date and the joint-worst margin of defeat in club history as Pareja made five changes to field yet another rotated team on a short week road game, this time away at Yankee stadium to face New York City FC. The likes of Nani and Mueller were left out of the squad completely, while Pereyra was suspended on yellow card accumulation, and Dike and Akindele remained away at the Gold Cup. Newest signing Emmanuel Mas made his debut from the start as the Lions lost 5–0 with five different players finding the scoresheet. On July 28, it was announced Alex Leitão, Orlando's Chief Executive Officer since 2015, was stepping down from his role. Orlando closed out the July schedule with another rivalry match against Atlanta United FC. 23-year-old academy product Mason Stajduhar made his club debut starting as goalkeeper, 2,090 days after first signing as a Homegrown in November 2015. Josef Martínez opened the scoring in 47 seconds before Kyle Smith, who was the only Orlando City player to start all 16 matches of the season so far, scored his first goal as a Lion since joining in 2019 to level before the break. Marcelino Moreno restored Atlanta's lead with a curling long-range golazo in the 66th minute before the 74th-minute introduction of Silvester van der Water turned things around. He scored the equalizer before turning provider, crossing for Nani's 87th-minute winner. The result extended Atlanta's franchise-record 11-game winless streak while Orlando remained unbeaten in six against their rivals and regained second place in the Eastern Conference. Nani, who also had one goal and one assist in the game, was later voted MLS Player of the Week. On July 31, former Orlando goalkeeper Adam Grinwis rejoined the club having last played for the Lions in 2019. The signing coincided with the end of Brandon Austin's loan on the same day.

=== August ===
With a condensed schedule and mounting list of unavailable players including Pedro Gallese, Antônio Carlos, João Moutinho, Sebas Méndez, Alexandre Pato and Daryl Dike, Orlando's slump continued in August with back to back 1–1 ties with two teams below the playoff line: first at home to bottom-of-the-table Inter Miami CF on August 4 and again three days later on the road to FC Cincinnati. Antônio Carlos scored his first goal of the season in the former but was knocked unconscious in the process and had to leave the game. The latter match marked the first time Orlando had played at the newly built TQL Stadium and saw Nani come off the bench to score the equalizer within one minute of entering. On August 12, Orlando played a non-domestic match for the first time, a 2021 Leagues Cup quarter-final against Mexican side Santos Laguna. Despite having 53% possession and matching Santos' 13 shots, Orlando narrowly lost 1–0, hampered by wasteful finishing. Frustrations boiled over at full-time as Júnior Urso received a red card after the final whistle for remonstrating with the referee. With New York City FC and Nashville SC pushing Orlando down into fourth place having not played a fixture over the weekend, Orlando played out a third successive league draw the following midweek. The Lions trailed to a C. J. Sapong goal in the first half on the road to third-place Nashville, before another set-piece header from Antônio Carlos rescued a point. Philadelphia's victory over NYCFC the same night meant Orlando moved another place down into fifth, the lowest position since the second week of the season. Orlando jumped back up to second place just three days later as two Homegrowns lifted the Lions to a 1–0 victory over Chicago Fire FC: Benji Michel scored his fourth goal of the season while goalkeeper Mason Stajduhar kept his first career clean sheet after making five saves on the night. Orlando ended August undefeated in league play (one win, four draws), finishing the month with a goalless draw with Inter Miami. The Lions looked likeliest to break the deadlock but Tesho Akindele had his penalty saved by Nick Marsman before Robin Jansson had a goal disallowed after review having been touched by an offside Akindele. The game also saw the return of Daryl Dike who entered as a halftime substitute for Akindele, his first appearance since leaving for international duty on July 3.

=== September ===
Orlando opened September with a 3–2 win at home to Columbus Crew. Having taken a two-goal lead into halftime, the Crew scored two goals in two minutes early in the second half to level. Júnior Urso scored the gamewinner in the 69th minute. A comprehensive 3–0 defeat on the road at Atlanta United on September 10 was followed up five days later with a midweek defeat at home to CF Montréal in which Nani picked up two first-half yellow cards to leave the Lions down a player while trying to overturn a two-goal deficit. Having found one goal through Robin Jansson in the 40th minute, 10-man Orlando found an equalizer through an unlikely source - Ruan scored his first goal for the club with just over an hour played. However, Montreal made their numerical advantage pay, eventually running out 4–2 winners as Orlando finished the game with nine players when Andrés Perea was sent off late on. The losing streak continued into its third game as Orlando traveled to Philadelphia four days later. A controversial opener, that was not overturned for an elbow to the face by Kacper Przybyłko on Rodrigo Schlegel despite the linesman signaling for the foul and VAR recommending a review, saw the Lions trail at the half once again. Ruan tied the game after the break with his second goal in as many games but Przybyłko restored the Union's lead four minutes later and the Lions again finished the game down a man, this time Antônio Carlos received the red card for bringing Sergio Santos down for a late penalty which Przybyłko slotted past Gallese. Having started the month still second in the East, the three game losing streak saw the Lions plummet down to fourth and fighting to remain above the playoff line. The skid continued as Orlando headed to Supporters' Shield leaders New England Revolution on September 25. Adam Buksa gave the home side the lead in the ninth minute before Dike leveled the scores in the 18th minute. New England's one-goal lead was restored through a Rodrigo Schlegel own goal in the 35th minute which would prove to be the deciding goal as the Revolution survived a 75th-minute penalty; Matt Turner saved Nani's spot kick, the third time an Orlando player had failed to convert a penalty in five attempts in 2021. The 2–1 result saw Orlando's losing streak extend to four games in all competitions, equaling the franchise record, as the team dropped another place to 5th. The losing streak was snapped at four when Orlando visited Nashville SC midweek on September 29, the team's third consecutive road game and their second on an in-season NFL field. The Lions fell behind early when Sebas Méndez conceded a penalty which, although saved by Gallese, was converted on the rebound by Hany Mukhtar. Randall Leal doubled the home side's lead in the second half. Following Orlando's recent penalty woes, Daryl Dike stepped up and scored a 72nd-minute spot kick having also won the foul to reduce the deficit and a Brian Anunga own goal in the third minute of second-half stoppage time salvaged a point as the game finished 2–2. However, failure to win meant Orlando fell to 7th in the Eastern Conference, now only two points above the playoff line, as victories for D.C. United and Atlanta United earlier in the evening saw them jump ahead of Orlando.

=== October ===
Having ended the four-losing streak with a stoppage time equalizer in the previous game, Orlando ended a five-game winless run with another goal in stoppage time on October 2 as Daryl Dike headed home from a corner in the 90+7th minute to lift the Lions to a 2–1 victory at home to D.C. United. The visitors had taken the lead through Julian Gressel in the sixth minute when his long-range effort caught out Pedro Gallese but had leveled when Robin Jansson reacted quickest to a rebound from a corner. The three points moved Orlando back up to 4th in a tight Eastern Conference playoff race as three points separated the six teams from 3rd to 8th-place with six games left. Orlando headed to FC Cincinnati off the back of an international break on October 16 and took an early lead against the league's lowest-ranked team through a long range curling Junior Urso shot that skipped into the bottom corner. An 84th-minute Tesho Akindele strike from 30 yards cannoned off the underside of the crossbar and appeared to cross the goalline. However, the officials did not award a goal and no camera angle could provide substantial enough evidence to overturn the call. Orlando escaped with all three points despite a stoppage time penalty scare when VAR was consulted to weigh in on a Rodrigo Schlegel collision with Brandon Vazquez in the box. An explanation was later issued by the referee stating that a penalty was not given because Schlegel had been pushed into Vazquez by FC Cincinnati's Nick Hagglund. The victory marked the first time since gameweek 10 on June 25 that Orlando won consecutive games. Four days later, the Lions hosted playoff rivals CF Montréal who sat four points behind Orlando in 7th. Having largely controlled the first half, Orlando finally broke the deadlock on the stroke of halftime when Chris Mueller ghosted in at the back post to score his third goal of the season and his first since announcing his end of season departure in July. However, the visitors rallied and began the second half quickly as Sunusi Ibrahim forced a point blank save from Gallese before Rudy Camacho headed the equalizer from a corner in the 50th minute. Searching for a winner, Orlando turned to Pato as an 86th-minute substitute, marking his first appearance since he left the season opener injured 187 days earlier. The game ended 1–1 as both Orlando and Montreal extended their unbeaten runs to four and three games respectively. Having clinched the 2021 Supporters' Shield the previous day by virtue of Sporting Kansas City beating second-place Seattle Sounders FC, New England Revolution traveled to Orlando on October 24 and rested nine starters. A full-strength Orlando controlled the first half capped off by top goalscorer Nani who rose to head home in the closing stages of the first half, breaking his 10-game scoreless streak. A Dike penalty, won by Nani, doubled the Lions' lead after the break. However, having notably substituted on all three of their designated players Gustavo Bou, Adam Buksa and Carles Gil, New England staged a late comeback: Buska scored in the 81st and 90+3rd minutes to split the points and prevent Orlando from moving up to 3rd place ahead of Nashville. Buksa was later named MLS Player of the Week for his performance against Orlando. Three days later, Orlando faced Columbus Crew on the road, falling to a two-goal deficit in the first half, both conceded from corners. Dike's third successful penalty of the season, which was originally saved but retaken because Eloy Room had come off his goal line early, halved the deficit but Lucas Zelarayán, having assisted the other two goals, scored one of his own from 30 yards to restore the two-goal cushion. Orlando City defender Robin Jansson, who became the Lions' all-time leader in minutes played for outfield players during the game, smartly sided-footed an Akindele cross past Room in the 90+2nd minute to set up a close finish but it wasn't enough to rescue a point as Orlando fell back down to 5th in the conference standings with two games remaining. Orlando went into the following game knowing that, because of victories for New York Red Bulls and Columbus Crew the day before, a win against Nashville SC would clinch a playoff place with a game to spare. The Lions took the lead through Dike, his third goal in as many games, before Mukhtar pulled Nashville level in the second half. A game of few clear cut chances, Orlando thought they had scored a 90+4th minute playoff-clinching game winner as substitute Perea followed in the rebound of a Pato freekick to poke the ball across the line. However, referee Allen Chapman, who had been at the center of controversy and was suspended by the league for his performance during Orlando's penalty shootout victory in the first round of the previous season's playoffs, consulted VAR and decided to rule out the goal for a supposed foul committed by Dike in the buildup much to the bewilderment of everyone in the stadium. On the decision, Óscar Pareja said during his postgame press conference: "It's a very sad day for the league. There's no explanation on a play that was so evident." Charlie Davies and Andrew Wiebe reviewed the event as part of MLS' own in-house media, both agreeing there was no foul and the decision was incorrect, even considering that Alistair Johnston was more likely fouling Dike than vice versa. PRO also later reviewed the decision, admitting the contact was minimal, did not meet the threshold for VAR intervention and therefore the on-field decision of a goal should have stood. The draw kept Orlando in 5th although only one point ahead of Atlanta and two points ahead of New York Red Bulls who faced each other in their game in hand during the following midweek. Orlando's decision day opponents Montreal, sitting five points behind the Lions in 10th, also had a game in hand and hosted Houston on Wednesday.

=== November ===
==== Decision Day ====
As a result of Atlanta United's midweek draw with New York Red Bulls, Orlando City fell one spot to 6th ahead of decision day. It was still possible for the Lions to finish as high as 4th or as low as 8th. Opponents Montreal had beat Houston midweek so moved two points behind Orlando meaning the Canadian side was now in a position to move above Orlando with a win on the final day. A draw would clinch a playoff berth for Orlando irrespective of results elsewhere while defeat would make the team reliant on New York Red Bulls losing away to Nashville. Orlando ultimately took care of their own business, clinching playoff qualification with a 2–0 victory in Montreal. After a cagey first half, Sebas Méndez opened the scoring in the 55th minute when he blasted the ball into the top corner from 20 yards. It was his first goal for the club on his 65th appearance. As Montreal's desperation increased, Rudy Camacho was shown a straight red card for an out of control challenge on Dike in the 79th minute before Dike doubled Orlando's lead late on to secure the win that saw Orlando finish the regular season 6th in the Eastern Conference.

=== Playoffs ===
Orlando entered the 2021 MLS Cup Playoffs as the Eastern Conference's #6 seed, setting up an away trip to #3 seed Nashville SC in the first round. The teams had met three times during the regular season with all three ending in draws. Dike gave Orlando an early first-half lead when he headed in from a Pereyra corner but Hany Mukhtar leveled seven minutes later with a 25-yard strike that took a deflection to sail over Pedro Gallese's head. Mukhtar doubled his and Nashville's tally in the second half, slotting home after a surging solo dribble before Jhonder Cádiz added a third deep into stoppage time to end the Lions' season.

== Roster ==
Last updated on November 5, 2021

No.	Nationality	Name	Position(s)	Date of birth (age)	Previous club	Notes
Goalkeepers
1	(Peru)	Pedro Gallese	GK	February 23, 1990 (aged 31)	(Mexico) Veracruz	INT
31	(United States)	Mason Stajduhar	GK	December 2, 1997 (aged 23)	(United States) Orlando City U-23	HGP
40	(United States)	Adam Grinwis	GK	April 21, 1992 (aged 28)	(United States) Sacramento Republic	–
Defenders
2	(Brazil)	Ruan	RB	May 29, 1995 (aged 25)	(Brazil) Barra da Tijuca	INT
3	(Argentina)	Emmanuel Mas	LB	January 15, 1989 (aged 32)	(Argentina) Boca Juniors	INT
4	(Portugal)	João Moutinho	LB	January 12, 1998 (aged 23)	(United States) Los Angeles FC	GA
6	(Sweden)	Robin Jansson	CB	November 15, 1991 (aged 29)	(Sweden) AIK	–
15	(Argentina)	Rodrigo Schlegel	CB	April 3, 1997 (aged 24)	(Argentina) Racing Club	INT
24	(United States)	Kyle Smith	RB	January 9, 1992 (aged 29)	(United States) Louisville City	–
25	(Brazil)	Antônio Carlos	CB	March 7, 1993 (aged 28)	(Brazil) Palmeiras	INT
26	(United States)	Michael Halliday	RB	January 22, 2003 (aged 18)	(United States) Orlando City B	HGP
29	(United States)	Rio Hope-Gund	CB	August 20, 1999 (aged 21)	(United States) Georgetown Hoyas	–
68	(United States)	Thomas Williams	CB	August 15, 2004 (aged 16)	(United States) Orlando City B	HGP
Midfielders
8	(Ecuador)	Sebas Méndez	DM	April 26, 1997 (aged 23)	(Ecuador) Independiente del Valle	–
10	(Uruguay)	Mauricio Pereyra	AM	March 15, 1990 (aged 31)	(Russia) FC Krasnodar	DP, INT
11	(Brazil)	Júnior Urso	CM	March 10, 1989 (aged 32)	(Brazil) Corinthians	INT
20	(Spain)	Uri Rosell	DM	July 7, 1992 (aged 28)	(Portugal) Sporting CP	–
21	(United States)	Andrés Perea	CM	November 14, 2000 (aged 20)	(Colombia) Atlético Nacional	–
28	(United States)	Raul Aguilera	DM	August 2, 1999 (aged 21)	(United States) Orlando City B	HGP
33	(United States)	Jordan Bender	CM	July 9, 2001 (aged 19)	(United States) Orlando City B	HGP
34	(Jamaica)	Joey DeZart	DM	June 9, 1998 (aged 22)	(United States) Wake Forest Demon Deacons	–
Forwards
7	(Brazil)	Alexandre Pato	CF	September 2, 1989 (aged 31)	(Brazil) São Paulo	INT
9	(United States)	Chris Mueller	RW	August 29, 1996 (aged 24)	(United States) Wisconsin Badgers	–
13	(Canada)	Tesho Akindele	CF	March 31, 1992 (aged 29)	(United States) FC Dallas	–
14	(Netherlands)	Silvester van der Water	RW	September 30, 1996 (aged 24)	(Netherlands) Heracles Almelo	INT
17	(Portugal)	Nani	LW	November 17, 1986 (aged 34)	(Portugal) Sporting CP	DP, INT
18	(United States)	Daryl Dike	CF	June 3, 2000 (aged 20)	(United States) Virginia Cavaliers	GA
19	(United States)	Benji Michel	RW	October 23, 1997 (aged 23)	(United States) Portland Pilots	HGP
22	(Ecuador)	Alexander Alvarado	LW	April 21, 1999 (aged 21)	(Ecuador) Aucas	INT
32	(Puerto Rico)	Wilfredo Rivera	LW	October 14, 2003 (aged 17)	(United States) Orlando City B	HGP
35	(United States)	Derek Dodson	CF	November 3, 1998 (aged 22)	(United States) Georgetown Hoyas	–

== Staff ==
Executive
Majority owner and chairman	(United States) Mark Wilf
Majority owner and vice-chair	(United States) Zygi Wilf
Majority owner and vice-chair	(United States) Leonard Wilf
Executive VP of soccer operations	(Brazil) Luiz Muzzi
Coaching staff
Head coach	(Colombia) Óscar Pareja
Assistant coach	(Argentina) Josema Bazán
Assistant coach	(Mexico) Diego Torres Ortiz
Strength and conditioning coach	(Argentina) Fabian Bazán
Goalkeeping coach	(Venezuela) César Baena

== Competitions ==
=== Friendlies ===
MLS required all players to report for preseason by March 1 in order to undergo a mandatory seven-day quarantine period and medical testing in light of the ongoing COVID-19 pandemic. Players who volunteered to quarantine earlier were permitted to begin group workouts from March 1 prior to the official start of team training on March 8.

March 15	Orlando City	1–0	Philadelphia Union	Clearwater, Florida
11:00 am	Alvarado 56'	Report		Stadium: Joe DiMaggio Field
Note: Closed-door scrimmage

March 18	Orlando City	2–3	New York City FC	Kissimmee, Florida
11:00 am	Jansson 43'; Pato 65'	Report	Castellanos 7' (pen.), 67'; Medina 39' (pen.)	Stadium: Osceola County Stadium
Note: Closed-door scrimmage

March 24	Orlando City	3–1	Philadelphia Union	Kissimmee, Florida
12:30 pm	Pato 28'; Mueller 35'; Aiás 63'	Report	Aaronson 79'	Stadium: Orlando City SC Training Ground
Note: Closed-door scrimmage

March 27	Orlando City	1–0	Columbus Crew	Kissimmee, Florida
7:00 pm	Akindele	Report		Stadium: Osceola County Stadium
Note: Closed-door scrimmage

March 31	Orlando City	1–0	FC Cincinnati	Kissimmee, Florida
7:00 pm	Halliday	Report		Stadium: Osceola County Stadium
Note: Closed-door scrimmage. Second-half shortened by weather.

April 3	Orlando City	2–2	Chicago Fire FC	Orlando, Florida
11:30 am	Mueller 25'; Michel 64'	Report	Frankowski 3'; Stojanović 56'	Stadium: Exploria Stadium
Note: Closed-door scrimmage

April 6	Orlando City	Canceled	Miami FC
Note: Closed-door scrimmage

April 9	Orlando City	3–2	Minnesota United FC	Orlando, Florida
11:00 am	Urso; Pato; van der Water	Report	Hansen; McMaster	Stadium: Exploria Stadium
Note: Closed-door scrimmage

=== Major League Soccer ===
Outside of the club, Austin FC joined the league as an expansion franchise, bringing the total number of MLS clubs to 27. However, Austin FC and Orlando City did not meet in the 2021 season. Sporting Kansas City and San Jose Earthquakes were the only Western Conference teams Orlando faced in the regular season in a bid to keep to a limited, regionalized schedule during the ongoing COVID-19 pandemic. The top seven teams from each conference qualified for the playoffs.

Results summary

Overall								Home						Away					
Pld	W	D	L	GF	GA	GD	Pts	W	D	L	GF	GA	GD	W	D	L	GF	GA	GD
34	13	12	9	50	48	+2	51	8	7	2	29	18	+11	5	5	7	21	30	−9

Last updated: November 7, 2021.
Source: Match reports

Round	1	2	3	4	5	6	7	8	9	10	11	12	13	14	15	16	17	18	19	20	21	22	23	24	25	26	27	28	29	30	31	32	33	34
Stadium	H	A	H	H	A	H	A	A	H	A	H	A	A	H	A	H	H	A	A	H	H	H	A	H	A	A	A	H	A	H	H	A	H	A
Result	D	D	W	D	W	W	L	W	W	W	L	L	D	W	L	W	D	D	D	W	D	W	L	L	L	L	D	W	W	D	D	L	D	W
Position (Note: ORL's position at the end of the matchweek, not their match.)	8	8	3	4	2	2	3	2	2	2	2	2	3	2	3	2	2	2	5	2	2	2	3	3	4	5	7	4	4	4	4	5	5	6

Updated to match(es) played on November 7, 2021. Source: Match reports
A = Away; H = Home; W = Win; D = Draw; L = Loss

Results

April 17 1	Orlando City	0–0	Atlanta United FC	Orlando, Florida
3:00 pm		Report		Stadium: Exploria Stadium; Attendance: 11,503; Referee: Jair Marrufo

April 23 2	Sporting Kansas City	1–1	Orlando City	Kansas City, Kansas
7:30 pm	Busio 45'; Punčec (yellow card) 86'	Report	Smith (yellow card) 12'; Méndez (yellow card) 61'; Nani 79'	Stadium: Children's Mercy Park; Referee: Joe Dickerson

May 1 3	Orlando City	3–0	FC Cincinnati	Orlando, Florida
7:30 pm	Akindele 1'; Nani 19'; Méndez (yellow card) 26'; Mueller (yellow card) 62'; Urso 80'	Report	Stanko (yellow card) 78'	Stadium: Exploria Stadium; Referee: Drew Fischer

May 8 4	Orlando City	1–1	New York City FC	Orlando, Florida
6:00 pm	Smith (yellow card) 34'; Nani 52'	Report	Sands (yellow card) 64'; Castellanos 77' (pen.)	Stadium: Exploria Stadium; Attendance: 11,503; Referee: Robert Sibiga

May 16 5	D.C. United	0–1	Orlando City	Washington, D.C.
8:00 pm	Hines-Ike (yellow card) 42'; Paredes (yellow card) 90+7'	Report	Pereyra 7', (yellow card) 69'; Moutinho (yellow card) 61'; Mueller (yellow card) 90+3'; Nani (yellow card) 90+5'	Stadium: Audi Field; Attendance: 5,280; Referee: Alex Chilowicz

May 22 6	Orlando City	1–0	Toronto FC	Orlando, Florida
7:00 pm	Akindele 12', (yellow card) 77'	Report	Soteldo (yellow card) 21'; Auro (yellow card) 63'	Stadium: Exploria Stadium; Attendance: 11,525; Referee: Victor Rivas
Note: Due to travel restrictions, Toronto FC began the season using Exploria Stadium as their home field. Orlando was designated the home team for this fixture.

May 29 7	New York Red Bulls	2–1	Orlando City	Harrison, New Jersey
1:00 pm	Clark 35'; Cásseres 60', (yellow card) 80'; Davis (yellow card) 65'	Report	Carlos (yellow card) 52'; Méndez (yellow card) 55'; Moutinho (yellow card) 74'; van der Water 84'	Stadium: Red Bull Arena; Referee: Ismail Elfath

June 19 8	Toronto FC	2–3	Orlando City	Orlando, Florida
7:30 pm	Akinola 10'; Osorio 39'; Delgado (yellow card) 64'; Gonzalez (yellow card) 67'	Report	Akindele 1'; Nani 8', (yellow card) 90+8'; Urso (yellow card) 70', (goal) 84'; Moutinho (yellow card) 75'	Stadium: Exploria Stadium; Attendance: Behind-closed-doors; Referee: Armando Villarreal
Note: Due to travel restrictions, Toronto FC began the season using Exploria Stadium as their home field. Toronto were designated the home team for this fixture and as such, the game was not open to fans.

June 22 9	Orlando City	5–0	San Jose Earthquakes	Orlando, Florida
7:30 pm	Nani 7' (pen.); Michel 16', 90'; Dike 31', 49'	Report	Judson (yellow card) 25'; Alanís (yellow card) 52'	Stadium: Exploria Stadium; Attendance: 15,476; Referee: Chris Penso
Note: Kick off delayed half an hour for inclement weather. A second lightning delay caused a stoppage in the 40th minute with the game resuming one hour later.

June 25 10	Inter Miami CF	1–2	Orlando City	Fort Lauderdale, Florida
8:00 pm	Ulloa (yellow card) 62'; G. Higuaín 67'; Matuidi (yellow card) 71'; González Pírez (yellow card) 79'	Report	Pereyra (yellow card) 10'; Urso (yellow card) 62'; Mueller 73', (yellow card) 79'; Nani 80'	Stadium: DRV PNK Stadium; Attendance: 17,926; Referee: Allen Chapman

July 3 11	Orlando City	1–2	New York Red Bulls	Orlando, Florida
7:30 pm	Urso (yellow card) 2'; Pereyra (yellow card) 41'; Mueller 59'	Report	Cásseres 6'; Duncan (yellow card) 22'; Fábio (yellow card) 34', (goal) 79'; Yearwood (yellow card) 57'; Barlow (yellow card) 90+6'	Stadium: Exploria Stadium; Attendance: 19,009; Referee: Joseph Dickerson

July 7 12	Chicago Fire FC	3–1	Orlando City	Chicago, Illinois
8:00 pm	Bornstein (yellow card) 12'; Medrán (yellow card) 22'; Sekulić 45+1'; Berić 72'; Herbers (yellow card) 84'; Offor 90+6'	Report	Perea 34'; Jansson (yellow card) 79'	Stadium: Soldier Field; Attendance: 8,002; Referee: Guido Gonzales Jr.

July 17 13	Toronto FC	1–1	Orlando City	Toronto, Ontario, Canada
7:30 pm	Altidore 72'; Bono (yellow card) 76'; Bradley (yellow card) 84'	Report	Schlegel (yellow card) 68'; Nani 77' (pen.); Perea (yellow card) 79'	Stadium: BMO Field; Attendance: 7,000; Referee: Marcos de Oliveira
Note: Due to travel restrictions, Toronto FC began the season using Exploria Stadium as their home field. This was the first match Toronto was able to play at BMO Field.

July 22 14	Orlando City	2–1	Philadelphia Union	Orlando, Florida
7:30 pm	Michel 10', (yellow card) 78'; Pereyra (yellow card) 45'; Perea 59'	Report	Santos (yellow card) 56'; Przybyłko 68'	Stadium: Exploria Stadium; Attendance: 15,432; Referee: Alan Kelly
Note: Kick off delayed an hour for inclement weather.

July 25 15	New York City FC	5–0	Orlando City	New York, New York
6:00 pm	Medina 40'; Tajouri-Shradi 53'; Moralez 65'; Acevedo (yellow card) 74'; Amundsen 79'; Castellanos 82'	Report	Carlos (yellow card) 40'; Schlegel (yellow card) 87'	Stadium: Yankee Stadium; Attendance: 13,503; Referee: Rosendo Mendoza

July 30 16	Orlando City	3–2	Atlanta United FC	Orlando, Florida
8:00 pm	Smith 43'; Perea (yellow card) 64'; van der Water 79'; Nani 87'	Report	Martínez 1'; Moreno 66'; Franco (yellow card) 86'	Stadium: Exploria Stadium; Attendance: 18,910; Referee: Rubiel Vazquez

August 4 17	Orlando City	1–1	Inter Miami CF	Orlando, Florida
8:00 pm	Carlos 45+1'; Urso (yellow card) 56'; Rosell (yellow card) 85'	Report	Gibbs 66'; Pizarro (yellow card) 68'	Stadium: Exploria Stadium; Attendance: 17,966; Referee: Armando Villarreal

August 7 18	FC Cincinnati	1–1	Orlando City	Cincinnati, Ohio
7:30 pm	Brenner 42'; Matarrita (yellow card) 53'	Report	Nani 56'; Schlegel (yellow card) 68'; Mueller (yellow card) 77'; DeZart (yellow card) 84'	Stadium: TQL Stadium; Attendance: 24,113; Referee: Fotis Bazakos

August 18 19	Nashville SC	1–1	Orlando City	Nashville, Tennessee
8:30 pm	Sapong 23'; Maher (yellow card) 32'; Anunga (yellow card) 65'; McCarty (yellow card) 81'	Report	Smith (yellow card) 40'; Jansson (yellow card) 49'; Carlos 58', (yellow card) 78'	Stadium: Nissan Stadium; Attendance: 13,154; Referee: Fotis Bazakos

August 21 20	Orlando City	1–0	Chicago Fire FC	Orlando, Florida
8:00 pm	Michel 51'; Mueller (yellow card) 78'	Report	Terán (yellow card) 72'	Stadium: Exploria Stadium; Attendance: 15,538; Referee: Tim Ford
Note: Kick off delayed 40mins for inclement weather.

August 27 21	Orlando City	0–0	Inter Miami CF	Orlando, Florida
8:30 pm	Jansson (yellow card) 51'	Report	Pizarro (yellow card) 63'; Makoun (yellow card) 84'	Stadium: Exploria Stadium; Attendance: 17,817; Referee: Ismail Elfath

September 4 22	Orlando City	3–2	Columbus Crew	Orlando, Florida
7:30 pm	Dike 26'; van der Water 29'; Urso (yellow card) 42', (goal) 69'; DeZart (yellow card) 51'	Report	Carlos 52' (o.g.); Berry 54'	Stadium: Exploria Stadium; Attendance: 15,366; Referee: Armando Villarreal

September 10 23	Atlanta United FC	3–0	Orlando City	Atlanta, Georgia
7:00 pm	Campbell 25', (yellow card) 45+1'; Franco (yellow card) 34'; Dike 38' (o.g.); Barco 72'; Sosa (yellow card) 81'	Report	Carlos (yellow card) 37'	Stadium: Mercedes-Benz Stadium; Attendance: 42,507; Referee: Victor Rivas

September 15 24	Orlando City	2–4	CF Montréal	Orlando, Florida
7:30 pm	Nani (yellow card) 28' (yellow-red card) 35'; Jansson 40'; Ruan 63'; Perea (red card) 83'	Report	Choinière 18'; Quioto 37'; Wanyama (yellow card) 39'; Waterman (yellow card) 72'; Lappalainen 73'; Ibrahim 80'	Stadium: Exploria Stadium; Attendance: 14,133; Referee: Rubiel Vazquez

September 19 25	Philadelphia Union	3–1	Orlando City	Chester, Pennsylvania
4:00 pm	Wagner 37'; Flach (yellow card) 53'; Przybyłko 61', 89' (pen.)	Report	Schlegel (yellow card) 33'; Ruan 57', (yellow card) 59'; Michel (yellow card) 75'; Gallese (yellow card) 80'; Jansson (yellow card) 80'; Aguilera (yellow card) 86'; Carlos (red card) 88'	Stadium: Subaru Park; Attendance: 15,032; Referee: Alan Kelly

September 25 26	New England Revolution	2–1	Orlando City	Foxborough, Massachusetts
7:00 pm	Buksa 9'; Schlegel 35' (o.g.); Buchanan (yellow card) 80'	Report	Dike 18'; Michel (yellow card) 19'; Jansson (yellow card) 39'	Stadium: Gillette Stadium; Attendance: 23,506; Referee: Rosendo Mendoza

September 29 27	Nashville SC	2–2	Orlando City	Nashville, Tennessee
8:30 pm	Mukhtar 11'; Godoy (yellow card) 34'; Leal 59'; Johnston (yellow card) 82'	Report	Pereyra (yellow card) 31'; Schlegel (yellow card) 62'; Dike 76' (pen.); Carlos (yellow card) 81'; Anunga 90+3' (o.g.)	Stadium: Nissan Stadium; Attendance: 18,648; Referee: Drew Fischer

October 2 28	Orlando City	2–1	D.C. United	Orlando, Florida
7:30 pm	Jansson 17'; Dike 90+7'	Report	Gressel 6'; Alfaro (yellow card) 20'; Canouse (yellow card) 67'; Hamid (yellow card) 90+5'	Stadium: Exploria Stadium; Attendance: 16,848; Referee: Guido Gonzales Jr.

October 16 29	FC Cincinnati	0–1	Orlando City	Cincinnati, Ohio
7:30 pm	Bailey (yellow card) 80'; Cameron (yellow card) 86'	Report	Urso 13'; Carlos (yellow card) 66'; Perea (yellow card) 74'	Stadium: West End Stadium; Attendance: 22,488; Referee: Marcos de Oliveira

October 20 30	Orlando City	1–1	CF Montréal	Orlando, Florida
7:30 pm	Rosell (yellow card) 30'; Mueller 45'; Schlegel (yellow card) 90+4'	Report	Camacho 51'; Ibrahim (yellow card) 90+1'	Stadium: Exploria Stadium; Attendance: 15,775; Referee: Robert Sibiga

October 24 31	Orlando City	2–2	New England Revolution	Orlando, Florida
7:30 pm	Nani 39'; Mueller (yellow card) 47'; Dike 50' (pen.)	Report	Buksa 81', 90+3'; Gil (yellow card) 87'	Stadium: Exploria Stadium; Attendance: 17,539; Referee: Chris Penso

October 27 32	Columbus Crew	3–2	Orlando City	Columbus, Ohio
7:30 pm	Berry 20'; Etienne 31'; Mensah (yellow card) 45'; Zelarayán 61'; Valenzuela (yellow card) 90+5'	Report	Méndez (yellow card) 13'; Dike 52' (pen.); Smith (yellow card) 57'; Jansson 90+2'	Stadium: Crew Stadium; Attendance: 16,676; Referee: Joseph Dickerson

October 31 33	Orlando City	1–1	Nashville SC	Orlando, Florida
7:30 pm	Dike 18'; Méndez (yellow card) 49'; Urso (yellow card) 57'	Report	Zimmerman (yellow card) 40'; Mukhtar 53'; Johnston (yellow card) 56'	Stadium: Exploria Stadium; Attendance: 15,959; Referee: Allen Chapman

November 7 34	CF Montréal	0–2	Orlando City	Montreal, Quebec, Canada
3:30 pm	Piette (yellow card) 45+1'; Camacho (red card) 79'	Report	van der Water (yellow card) 34'; Méndez 55', (yellow card) 56'; Urso (yellow card) 65'; Dike 86'	Stadium: Saputo Stadium; Referee: Armando Villarreal
Note: Due to travel restrictions, CF Montréal began the season using Inter Miami CF Stadium as their home field. They were able to return to play in Canada on July 17.

==== Standings ====
Eastern Conference table

Pos	Team	Pld	W	L	T	GF	GA	GD	Pts	Qualification
4	New York City FC	34	14	11	9	56	36	+20	51	Qualification for the first round and the CONCACAF Champions League (Note: As MLS Cup 2021 champions)
5	Atlanta United FC	34	13	9	12	45	37	+8	51	Qualification for the first round
6	Orlando City SC	34	13	9	12	50	48	+2	51	Qualification for the first round
7	New York Red Bulls	34	13	12	9	39	33	+6	48	Qualification for the first round
8	D.C. United	34	14	15	5	56	54	+2	47	

Source: MLS
Rules for classification: 1) points; 2) total wins; 3) total goal differential; 4) total goals scored; 5) fewer disciplinary points; 6) away goal differential; 7) away goals scored; 8) home goals differential; 9) home goals scored; 10) coin toss (2 clubs tied) or drawing of lots (≥3 clubs tied)
Notes:

Overall table

Pos	Team	Pld	W	L	T	GF	GA	GD	Pts	
8	New York City FC (C)	34	14	11	9	56	36	+20	51	Qualification for the CONCACAF Champions League (Note: As MLS Cup 2021 champions (USA1))
9	Atlanta United FC	34	13	9	12	45	37	+8	51	
10	Orlando City SC	34	13	9	12	50	48	+2	51	
11	Minnesota United FC	34	13	11	10	42	44	−2	49	
12	Vancouver Whitecaps FC	34	12	9	13	45	45	0	49	

Source: MLS
Rules for classification: 1) points; 2) total wins; 3) total goal differential; 4) total goals scored; 5) fewer disciplinary points; 6) away goal differential; 7) away goals scored; 8) home goals differential; 9) home goals scored; 10) coin toss (2 clubs tied) or drawing of lots (≥3 clubs tied)
(C) Champions

=== MLS Cup Playoffs ===
November 23 First round	#3 Nashville SC	3–1	#6 Orlando City	Nashville, Tennessee
8:00 pm	Mukhtar 21', 74'; Anibaba (yellow card) 85'; Cádiz 90+4'	Report	Dike 14'; Pereyra (yellow card) 39'; Méndez (yellow card) 65'	Stadium: Nissan Stadium; Attendance: 26,043; Referee: Ismail Elfath

=== U.S. Open Cup ===
On March 29, the USSF and Open Cup Committee confirmed plans for a shortened 16-team U.S. Open Cup including the cancellation of the opening stages. The competition was originally scheduled to begin at the Round of 16 stage with MLS holding eight berths given to the top eight US-based MLS clubs in the 2021 regular season standings based on average points per game as of the third weekend of play on May 3. However, on April 16, the committee decided to not hold the competition in spring due to "logistical and financial challenges" but left open the possibility of holding it later in the year. The competition was officially canceled on July 20.

=== Leagues Cup ===
Orlando City were one of four MLS teams qualified for the 2021 edition of the Leagues Cup as one of the top two teams from each conference based on the 2020 regular season standings not scheduled to participate in the Champions League. The single-elimination tournament took place entirely in the United States and saw each MLS team drawn against a Liga MX team for the opening round.

August 12 Quarter-final	Orlando City	0–1	(Mexico) Santos Laguna	Orlando, Florida
7:00 pm	Nani (yellow card) 15'; Akindele (yellow card) 50'; Urso (yellow card) 85' (red card) FT	Report	Otero 30'; Almada (yellow card) 82'	Stadium: Exploria Stadium; Attendance: 7,338; Referee: Selvin Brown

== Squad statistics ==
=== Appearances ===
As of match played November 23, 2021

Starting appearances are listed first, followed by substitute appearances after the + symbol where applicable.

No.	Pos	Nat	Player	Total		MLS		Playoffs		Leagues Cup	
No.	Pos	Nat	Player	Apps	Goals	Apps	Goals	Apps	Goals	Apps	Goals
Goalkeepers
1	GK	(Peru) PER	Pedro Gallese	23	0	22	0	1	0	0	0
31	GK	(United States) USA	Mason Stajduhar	6	0	5	0	0	0	1	0
40	GK	(United States) USA	Adam Grinwis	2	0	2	0	0	0	0	0
Defenders
2	DF	(Brazil) BRA	Ruan	26	2	21+3	2	1	0	1	0
3	DF	(Argentina) ARG	Emmanuel Mas	18	0	7+9	0	1	0	0+1	0
4	DF	(Portugal) POR	João Moutinho	21	0	14+6	0	0	0	1	0
6	DF	(Sweden) SWE	Robin Jansson	30	3	26+2	3	1	0	1	0
15	DF	(Argentina) ARG	Rodrigo Schlegel	23	0	16+7	0	0	0	0	0
24	DF	(United States) USA	Kyle Smith	28	1	21+6	1	0	0	0+1	0
25	DF	(Brazil) BRA	Antônio Carlos	31	2	28+1	2	1	0	1	0
26	DF	(United States) USA	Michael Halliday	6	0	4+2	0	0	0	0	0
29	DF	(United States) USA	Rio Hope-Gund	0	0	0	0	0	0	0	0
68	DF	(United States) USA	Thomas Williams	0	0	0	0	0	0	0	0
Midfielders
8	MF	(Ecuador) ECU	Sebas Méndez	18	1	15+2	1	1	0	0	0
10	MF	(Uruguay) URU	Mauricio Pereyra	31	1	26+3	1	1	0	1	0
11	MF	(Brazil) BRA	Júnior Urso	32	4	29+1	4	1	0	1	0
20	MF	(Spain) ESP	Uri Rosell	14	0	6+8	0	0	0	0	0
21	MF	(United States) USA	Andrés Perea	28	2	16+11	2	0	0	1	0
28	MF	(United States) USA	Raul Aguilera	3	0	0+3	0	0	0	0	0
33	MF	(United States) USA	Jordan Bender	0	0	0	0	0	0	0	0
34	MF	(Jamaica) JAM	Joey DeZart	17	0	7+10	0	0	0	0	0
Forwards
7	FW	(Brazil) BRA	Alexandre Pato	5	0	1+3	0	0+1	0	0	0
9	FW	(United States) USA	Chris Mueller	31	3	18+11	3	1	0	1	0
13	FW	(Canada) CAN	Tesho Akindele	34	3	15+17	3	0+1	0	1	0
14	FW	(Netherlands) NED	Silvester van der Water	29	3	12+15	3	0+1	0	0+1	0
17	FW	(Portugal) POR	Nani	30	10	22+6	10	0+1	0	1	0
18	FW	(United States) USA	Daryl Dike	19	11	15+3	10	1	1	0	0
19	FW	(United States) USA	Benji Michel	36	4	19+15	4	1	0	0+1	0
22	FW	(Ecuador) ECU	Alexander Alvarado	10	0	2+8	0	0	0	0	0
32	FW	(Puerto Rico) PUR	Wilfredo Rivera	0	0	0	0	0	0	0	0
Players away from the club on loan:
30	MF	(United States) USA	David Loera	2	0	0+1	0	0	0	0+1	0
35	FW	(United States) USA	Derek Dodson	0	0	0	0	0	0	0	0
99	FW	(Brazil) BRA	Matheus Aiás	2	0	0+2	0	0	0	0	0
Players who appeared for the club but left during the season:
23	GK	(United States) USA	Brandon Austin	5	0	5	0	0	0	0	0

=== Goalscorers ===
As of match played November 23, 2021

Rank	No.	Pos.	Name	MLS	Playoffs	Leagues Cup	Total
1	18	FW	(United States) Daryl Dike	10	1	0	11
2	17	FW	(Portugal) Nani	10	0	0	10
3	11	MF	(Brazil) Júnior Urso	4	0	0	4
3	19	FW	(United States) Benji Michel	4	0	0	4
5	9	FW	(United States) Chris Mueller	3	0	0	3
5	6	DF	(Sweden) Robin Jansson	3	0	0	3
5	13	FW	(Canada) Tesho Akindele	3	0	0	3
5	14	FW	(Netherlands) Silvester van der Water	3	0	0	3
9	2	DF	(Brazil) Ruan	2	0	0	2
9	21	MF	(United States) Andrés Perea	2	0	0	2
9	25	DF	(Brazil) Antônio Carlos	2	0	0	2
12	8	MF	(Ecuador) Sebas Méndez	1	0	0	1
12	10	MF	(Uruguay) Mauricio Pereyra	1	0	0	1
12	24	DF	(United States) Kyle Smith	1	0	0	1
Own goals				1	0	0	1
Total				50	1	0	51

=== Shutouts ===
As of match played November 23, 2021

Rank	No.	Pos.	Name	MLS	Playoffs	Leagues Cup	Total
1	1	GK	(Peru) Pedro Gallese	7	0	0	7
2	23	GK	(United States) Brandon Austin	1	0	0	1
2	31	GK	(United States) Mason Stajduhar	1	0	0	1
Total				9	0	0	9

=== Disciplinary record ===
As of match played November 23, 2021

No.	Pos.	Name	MLS			Playoffs			Leagues Cup			Total		
No.	Pos.	Name	Yellow card	(yellow card) (yellow-red card)	Red card	Yellow card	(yellow card) (yellow-red card)	Red card	Yellow card	(yellow card) (yellow-red card)	Red card	Yellow card	(yellow card) (yellow-red card)	Red card
1	GK	(Peru) Pedro Gallese	1	0	0	0	0	0	0	0	0	1	0	0
2	DF	(Brazil) Ruan	1	0	0	0	0	0	0	0	0	1	0	0
4	DF	(Portugal) João Moutinho	3	0	0	0	0	0	0	0	0	3	0	0
6	DF	(Sweden) Robin Jansson	5	0	0	0	0	0	0	0	0	5	0	0
8	MF	(Ecuador) Sebas Méndez	6	0	0	1	0	0	0	0	0	7	0	0
9	FW	(United States) Chris Mueller	6	0	0	0	0	0	0	0	0	6	0	0
10	MF	(Uruguay) Mauricio Pereyra	5	0	0	1	0	0	0	0	0	6	0	0
11	MF	(Brazil) Júnior Urso	7	0	0	0	0	0	1	0	1	8	0	1
13	FW	(Canada) Tesho Akindele	1	0	0	0	0	0	1	0	0	2	0	0
14	FW	(Netherlands) Silvester van der Water	1	0	0	0	0	0	0	0	0	1	0	0
15	DF	(Argentina) Rodrigo Schlegel	6	0	0	0	0	0	0	0	0	6	0	0
17	FW	(Portugal) Nani	2	1	0	0	0	0	1	0	0	3	1	0
19	FW	(United States) Benji Michel	3	0	0	0	0	0	0	0	0	3	0	0
20	MF	(Spain) Uri Rosell	2	0	0	0	0	0	0	0	0	2	0	0
21	MF	(United States) Andrés Perea	3	0	1	0	0	0	0	0	0	3	0	1
24	DF	(United States) Kyle Smith	4	0	0	0	0	0	0	0	0	4	0	0
25	DF	(Brazil) Antônio Carlos	6	0	1	0	0	0	0	0	0	6	0	1
28	MF	(United States) Raul Aguilera	1	0	0	0	0	0	0	0	0	1	0	0
34	MF	(Jamaica) Joey DeZart	2	0	0	0	0	0	0	0	0	2	0	0
Total			65	1	2	2	0	0	3	0	1	70	1	3

== Player movement ==
Per Major League Soccer and club policies, terms of the deals do not get disclosed.

=== MLS SuperDraft picks ===
Draft picks are not automatically signed to the team roster. The 2021 MLS SuperDraft was held on January 21, 2021. Orlando had four selections.

2021 Orlando City MLS SuperDraft Picks
Round	Selection	Player	Position	College	Status
1	8	(United States) Derek Dodson	CF	(Washington, D.C.) Georgetown University	Signed
1	19	(United States) Rio Hope-Gund	CB	(Washington, D.C.) Georgetown University	Signed
1	22	(United States) Brandon Hackenberg	CB	Pennsylvania State University	NCAA returnee
2	49	(United States) Andrew Pannenberg	GK	(North Carolina) Wake Forest University	Not signed

=== Transfers in ===
No.	Name	Pos.	Transferred from	Fee/notes	Date	Ref.
25	(Brazil) Antônio Carlos	CB	(Brazil) Palmeiras	Exercised option to buy, reportedly $1.7m	December 1, 2020	
15	(Argentina) Rodrigo Schlegel	CB	(Argentina) Racing Club	Exercised option to buy, reportedly $500k	December 2, 2020	
21	(United States) Andrés Perea	CM	(Colombia) Atlético Nacional	Exercised option to buy	December 2, 2020	
22	(Ecuador) Alexander Alvarado	LW	(Ecuador) Aucas	Exercised option to buy	December 2, 2020	
7	(Brazil) Alexandre Pato	CF	(Brazil) São Paulo	Free agent signing	February 13, 2021	
14	(Netherlands) Silvester van der Water	RW	(Netherlands) Heracles Almelo	Undisclosed fee, reportedly $1.45m	February 23, 2021	
32	(Puerto Rico) Wilfredo Rivera	LW	(United States) Orlando City B	Signed Homegrown contract	March 22, 2021	
28	(United States) Raul Aguilera	DM	(United States) Orlando City B	Signed Homegrown contract	April 5, 2021	
68	(United States) Thomas Williams	CB	(United States) Orlando City B	Signed Homegrown contract	June 15, 2021	
3	(Argentina) Emmanuel Mas	LB	(Argentina) Boca Juniors	Free agent signing	July 14, 2021	
40	(United States) Adam Grinwis	GK	(United States) Sacramento Republic	Free agent signing	July 31, 2021	

=== Loans in ===
No.	Name	Pos.	Loaned from	Notes	Date	Ref.
23	(United States) Brandon Austin	GK	(England) Tottenham Hotspur	Six-month loan with an option for an additional six months; expired 7/31/21	January 22, 2021	
16	(United States) Jonathan Suárez	LB	(Mexico) Querétaro	One-year loan with option to buy; terminated 2/28/21	February 3, 2021	
93	(Trinidad and Tobago) Greg Ranjitsingh	GK	(United States) MLS pool	Emergency MLS goalkeeper pool signing; rostered for match played 9/10/21	September 3, 2021	

=== Transfers out ===
No.	Name	Pos.	Transferred to	Fee/notes	Date	Ref.
14	(United States) Dom Dwyer	CF	(Canada) Toronto FC	Contract expired; Signed with Toronto FC on 5/11/21	December 2, 2020	
3	(United States) Alex DeJohn	CB	(United States) Pittsburgh Riverhounds	Option declined; Signed with Pittsburgh Riverhounds on 2/9/21	December 2, 2020	
17	(Paraguay) Josué Colmán	AM	(Paraguay) Guaraní	Option declined; Signed with Guaraní on 1/27/21	December 2, 2020	
77	(Brazil) Robinho	LW	(Brazil) Confiança	Option declined; Signed with Confiança on 2/1/21	December 2, 2020	
29	(Colombia) Santiago Patiño	CF	(United States) San Antonio FC	Option declined; Signed with San Antonio FC on 1/6/21	December 2, 2020	
27	(Canada) Kamal Miller	CB	(United States) Austin FC	Selected in the 2020 MLS Expansion Draft.	December 15, 2020	
23	(United States) Brian Rowe	GK	Retired	Out of contract	December 31, 2020	

=== Loans out ===
No.	Name	Pos.	Loaned to	Notes	Date	Ref.
18	(United States) Daryl Dike	CF	(England) Barnsley	Until the end of the Barnsley season (May 31, 2021) with an option to buy	February 1, 2021	
33	(United States) Jordan Bender	CM	(United States) Charlotte Independence	Until the end of season; recalled 9/1/21	May 6, 2021	
99	(Brazil) Matheus Aiás	CF	(Spain) Real Oviedo	Until June 30, 2022, with an option to buy	July 4, 2021	
35	(United States) Derek Dodson	CF	(United States) Hartford Athletic	No loan length specified, Orlando holds right to recall at any time; recalled 11/5/21	July 9, 2021	
30	(United States) David Loera	AM	(United States) Phoenix Rising	Until the end of season	September 9, 2021	
