= 2026 Las Vegas Lights FC season =

Las Vegas Lights FC
2026 season
- Principal Owner: José Bautista
- Head coach: Devin Rensing
- Stadium: Cashman Field
- USL Championship: Western Conference: 11th
- USL Championship Playoffs: DNQ
- U.S. Open Cup: DNQ
- USL Cup: Group Stage
- Top goalscorer: League: Johnny Rodriguez (12); All: Johnny Rodriguez (12)
- Highest home attendance: 3,791 (June 20, against Orange County SC)
- Lowest home attendance: 2,116 (May 2, against Lexington SC)
- Average home league attendance: 2,877
| Home colors | Away colors | Third colors |

The 2026 Las Vegas Lights FC season was the club's ninth season, and their ninth season in the United Soccer League Championship (USLC), the second division of American soccer.

The Lights played their final season at Cashman Field, where they have played since their inaugural season in 2018, due to the Las Vegas City Council, who owns the Cashman Complex, deciding to rezone the land where the stadium currently stands for high-density housing.

== Squad ==
=== Roster ===
As of June 30, 2026

Note: Flags indicate national team as defined under FIFA eligibility rules; some limited exceptions apply. Players may hold more than one non-FIFA nationality.

| No. | Pos. | Nation | Player |
|---|---|---|---|
| 3 | DF | USA | Nate Jones |
| 6 | DF | USA | Nyk Sessock |
| 8 | MF | USA | Kyle Scott |
| 9 | FW | VEN | Manuel Arteaga |
| 10 | MF | DOM | Edison Azcona |
| 11 | FW | USA | Christian Pinzón |
| 13 | GK | USA | Charlie Lanphier |
| 14 | FW | USA | Johnny Rodriguez |
| 17 | MF | USA | Patrick Leal |
| 18 | MF | USA | Carson Locker |
| 20 | DF | USA | Shawn Smart |

| No. | Pos. | Nation | Player |
|---|---|---|---|
| 23 | MF | USA | Marc Ybarra |
| 25 | FW | VIN | Oalex Anderson |
| 26 | FW | SOM | Handwalla Bwana |
| 27 | MF | ITA | Giorgio Probo |
| 30 | DF | USA | Ben Ofeimu |
| 33 | DF | MEX | Aarón Guillén |
| 43 | MF | GHA | Abraham Okyere |
| 45 | DF | USA | Blake Pope |
| 81 | DF | CAN | Themi Antonoglou |
| 96 | GK | USA | Carver Miller |

=== Out on loan ===
Note: Flags indicate national team as defined under FIFA eligibility rules; some limited exceptions apply. Players may hold more than one non-FIFA nationality.

| No. | Pos. | Nation | Player |
|---|---|---|---|
| 7 | FW | USA | Ben Mines (on loan to Hartford Athletic) |
| 99 | GK | USA | Jared Mazzola (on loan to Athletic Club Boise) |

=== Staff ===
| Title | Name | Nation |
|---|---|---|
| Owner | José Bautista | Dominican Republic |
| CEO | Shawn McIntosh | Italy |
| Sporting director | Gianleonardo Neglia | Italy |
| Head coach | Devin Rensing | United States |
| Assistant coach | Giovanni Troise | Italy |
| Goalkeeping Coach | Maximiliano Jose Rabinovich | Argentina |

== Competitions ==
=== USL Championship ===
==== Standings ====
| Pos | Team | Pld | W | L | T | GF | GA | GD | Pts | Qualification |
|---|---|---|---|---|---|---|---|---|---|---|
| 8 | Phoenix Rising FC | 30 | 11 | 10 | 9 | 45 | 46 | −1 | 42 | Playoffs |
| 9 | Orange County SC | 30 | 10 | 11 | 9 | 39 | 49 | −10 | 39 | |
| 10 | Oakland Roots SC | 30 | 9 | 10 | 11 | 39 | 40 | −1 | 38 | |
| 11 | Las Vegas Lights FC | 30 | 10 | 14 | 6 | 41 | 48 | −7 | 36 | |
| 12 | Monterey Bay FC | 30 | 6 | 18 | 6 | 32 | 52 | −20 | 24 | |

Updated to match(es) played on October 24, 2026. Source: USL Championship Standings
Rules for classification: 1) total wins against conference opponents; 2) goal differential against conference opponents; 3) goals scored against conference opponents; 4) head-to-head points against conference opponents; 5) points per game against conference opponents; 6) points per game against non-conference opponents; 7) fewest disciplinary points; 8) coin toss or drawing of lots

==== Match results ====
On December 16, 2025, the USL Championship released the schedule for all 25 teams for both the regular season and the USL Cup.

All times are in Pacific Standard Time.

===== March =====
| March 7 1 | Orange County SC | 1–1 | Las Vegas Lights FC | Irvine, California |
| 7:00 PM | Mackinnon 22' | Report | Pickering 84' | Stadium: Championship Soccer Stadium; Attendance: 3,475; Referee: Abdou Ndiaye |

| March 14 2 | Colorado Springs Switchbacks FC | 3–2 | Las Vegas Lights FC | Colorado Springs, Colorado |
| 4:00 PM | Johnson 60'; Fjellberg 70'; Ofeimu 85' (o.g.) | Report | Okyere 75', 79' | Stadium: Weidner Field; Attendance: 6,039; Referee: Elton García |

| March 21 3 | FC Tulsa | 3–2 | Las Vegas Lights FC | Tulsa, Oklahoma |
| 5:00 PM | ElMedkhar 41'; Cabral 61'; Damm 82' | Report | Rodriguez 32'; Okyere 66' | Stadium: ONEOK Field; Attendance: 4,012; Referee: Corbyn May |

| March 28 4 | Las Vegas Lights FC | 1–0 | Monterey Bay FC | Las Vegas, Nevada |
| 7:30 PM | Rodriguez 49' (pen.) | Report | | Stadium: Cashman Field; Attendance: 3,708; Referee: Brandon Stevis |

===== April =====
| April 4 5 | El Paso Locomotive FC | 3–2 | Las Vegas Lights FC | El Paso, Texas |
| 6:00 PM | Moreno 7', 48'; Rubín 34' | Report | Pinzón 23'; Rodriguez 60' | Stadium: Southwest University Park; Attendance: 5,432; Referee: Benjamin Meyer |

| April 11 6 | Las Vegas Lights FC | 1–1 | Sacramento Republic FC | Las Vegas, Nevada |
| 7:30 PM | Guillen 20' | Report | Kaye 30' | Stadium: Cashman Field; Attendance: 3,081; Referee: Ramy Touchan |

| April 22 7 | Oakland Roots SC | 4–2 | Las Vegas Lights FC | Oakland, California |
| 7:00 PM | Wilson 18', 58', 87' (pen.); Bettache 22' | Report | Anderson 69'; Rodriguez 78' | Stadium: Oakland Coliseum; Attendance: 2,496; Referee: Muhammad Hassan |

===== May =====
| May 2 8 | Las Vegas Lights FC | 2–1 | Lexington SC | Las Vegas, Nevada |
| 7:30 PM | Rodriguez 11'; Pinzón 38'; Ybarra (red card) 83' | Report | Molloy 6' | Stadium: Cashman Field; Attendance: 2,116; Referee: Alex Billeter |

| May 9 9 | New Mexico United | 3–1 | Las Vegas Lights FC | Albuquerque, New Mexico |
| 6:00 PM | Reid-Stephen 32'; Jabang 53'; Bailey 73' | Report | Anderson 40' | Stadium: Isotopes Park; Attendance: 8,655; Referee: Deny Kulasinac |

| May 23 10 | Las Vegas Lights FC | 2–0 | Colorado Springs Switchbacks FC | Las Vegas, Nevada |
| 7:30 PM | Pope 45+2'; Rodriguez 59' | Report | | Stadium: Cashman Field; Attendance: 3,253; Referee: Kalilou Jarju |

| May 30 11 | Las Vegas Lights FC | 0–0 | FC Tulsa | Las Vegas, Nevada |
| 7:30 PM | | Report | | Stadium: Cashman Field; Attendance: 2,939; Referee: Elvis Osmanovic |

===== June =====
| June 13 12 | Birmingham Legion FC | 1–2 | Las Vegas Lights FC | Birmingham, Alabama |
| 5:00 PM | Saucedo 89' | Report | Anderson 15'; Rodriguez 60' | Stadium: Protective Stadium; Attendance: 3,619; Referee: Cristian Campo Hernández |

| June 20 13 | Las Vegas Lights FC | 2–3 | Orange County SC | Las Vegas, Nevada |
| 7:30 PM | Anderson 38'; Rodriguez 66' | Report | Mackinnon 45'; Bazini 55'; Tubbs 76' | Stadium: Cashman Field; Attendance: 2,791; Referee: Gerald Flores |

===== July =====
| July 4 14 | Las Vegas Lights FC | 1–2 | El Paso Locomotive FC | Las Vegas, Nevada |
| 7:30 PM | Rodriguez 45+6' | Report | Méndez 20'; Quezada 52' | Stadium: Cashman Field; Attendance: 3,782; Referee: Edson Carvajal |

| July 18 15 | San Antonio FC | 1–2 | Las Vegas Lights FC | San Antonio, Texas |
| 6:00 PM | Cuello 6'; Patino (red card) 90+3' | Report | Rodriguez 47'; Okyere 79' | Stadium: Toyota Field; Attendance: 5,983; Referee: Brandon Stevis |

| July 25 16 | Detroit City FC | 0–1 | Las Vegas Lights FC | Hamtramck, Michigan |
| 4:00 PM | | Report | Anderson 1' | Stadium: Keyworth Stadium; Attendance: 7,252; Referee: Muhammad Hassan |

===== August =====
| August 1 17 | Las Vegas Lights FC | 1–1 | Phoenix Rising FC | Las Vegas, Nevada |
| 7:30 PM | Antonoglou 2' | Report | Ofeimu 42' (o.g.) | Stadium: Cashman Field; Referee: Atahan Yaya |

| August 5 18 | Las Vegas Lights FC | 0–0 | Oakland Roots SC | Las Vegas, Nevada |
| 7:30 PM | | Report | | Stadium: Cashman Field; Attendance: 2,230; Referee: Drew Klemp |

| August 8 19 | Miami FC | 0–1 | Las Vegas Lights FC | Miami, Florida |
| 4:00 PM | | Report | Arteaga 34' | Stadium: Pitbull Stadium; Attendance: 656; Referee: Amin Hadzic |

| August 15 20 | Las Vegas Lights FC | 2–1 | Brooklyn FC | Las Vegas, Nevada |
| 7:30 PM | Anderson 68'; Rodriguez 87' | Report | Obregón Jr. 4' | Stadium: Cashman Field |

| August 22 21 | Lexington SC | 2–0 | Las Vegas Lights FC | Lexington, Kentucky |
| 4:00 PM | Firmino 51'; Epps 53' | Report | | Stadium: Lexington SC Stadium; Attendance: 4,399; Referee: Robert Vincze |

| August 29 22 | Las Vegas Lights FC | 0–2 | Charleston Battery | Las Vegas, Nevada |
| 7:30 PM | | Report | Foster 40', 59' | Stadium: Cashman Field; Attendance: 2,215; Referee: Brandon Stevis |

===== September =====
| September 5 23 | Las Vegas Lights FC | 1–2 | New Mexico United | Las Vegas, Nevada |
| 7:30 PM | Anderson 29' | Report | Hurst 34'; Keller 79' | Stadium: Cashman Field; Attendance: 2,611; Referee: Muhammad Kaleia |

| September 12 24 | Orange County SC | 0–2 | Las Vegas Lights FC | Irvine, California |
| 7:00 PM | | Report | Rodriguez 13'; Anderson 90+5' | Stadium: Championship Soccer Stadium; Attendance: 3,990; Referee: Calin Radosav |

| September 19 25 | Las Vegas Lights FC | 1–1 | Hartford Athletic | Las Vegas, Nevada |
| 7:30 PM | Arteaga 70' | Report | Ngalina 33' (pen.) | Stadium: Cashman Field; Referee: Joe Surgan |

| September 30 26 | Sacramento Republic FC | 3–2 | Las Vegas Lights FC | Sacramento, California |
| 7:00 PM | Rodríguez 36'; Wolff 58'; Edwards 82' | Report | Anderson 13'; Locker 50' | Stadium: Heart Health Park; Attendance: 8,407; Referee: Jeremy Scheer |

===== October =====
| October 3 27 | Las Vegas Lights FC | 1–0 | San Antonio FC | Las Vegas, Nevada |
| 7:30 PM | Arteaga 45+3' | Report | | Stadium: Cashman Field; Attendance: 2,699; Referee: Abdou Ndiaye |

| October 10 28 | Phoenix Rising FC | 3–2 | Las Vegas Lights FC | Phoenix, Arizona |
| 7:00 PM | Sacko 24', 45+9' (pen.); Studenthofft 30' | Report | Leal 77'; Anderson 85' | Stadium: Phoenix Rising Soccer Stadium; Attendance: 6,238; Referee: Erick Lezama |

| October 17 29 | Las Vegas Lights FC | 3–5 | Lexington SC | Las Vegas, Nevada |
| 7:30 PM | Locker 25'; Anderson 45+2'; Leal 81' | Report | Zengue 4'; Firmino 39', 62'; Ferri 75'; Seagrist 90+1' | Stadium: Cashman Field; Referee: Igor Bych |

| October 24 30 | Monterey Bay FC | 2–1 | Las Vegas Lights FC | Seaside, California |
| 7:00 PM | Glasgow 74'; Lletget 88'; Barajas (yellow card) 71' (yellow-red card) 90+3' | Report | Ybarra 79' | Stadium: Cardinale Stadium; Referee: Braeden Frey |

==== USL Cup ====
The Lights participated in the third edition of the USL Cup, the second edition to feature teams from both the USL Championship and League One.

==== Standings ====
| Pos | Lg | Team | Pld | W | PKW | PKL | L | GF | GA | GD | Pts |
|---|---|---|---|---|---|---|---|---|---|---|---|
| 2 | USL1 | AC Boise | 4 | 2 | 1 | 0 | 1 | 8 | 6 | +2 | 8 |
| 3 | USLC | Sacramento Republic FC | 4 | 2 | 1 | 0 | 1 | 6 | 3 | +3 | 8 |
| 4 | USLC | Oakland Roots SC | 4 | 1 | 0 | 1 | 2 | 4 | 5 | −1 | 4 |
| 5 | USLC | Las Vegas Lights FC | 4 | 1 | 0 | 1 | 2 | 4 | 6 | −2 | 4 |
| 6 | USLC | Monterey Bay FC | 4 | 0 | 1 | 1 | 2 | 7 | 9 | −2 | 3 |

==== Group stage ====
| April 25, 2026 | Las Vegas Lights FC | 1–1 (2–4 p) | Athletic Club Boise | Las Vegas, Nevada |
| 7:30 p.m. | Pickering 61' | Report | Oyler 64' | Stadium: Cashman Field; Attendance: 2,684; Referee: Robert Vincze |
| | Penalties |
| | Pickering (penalty scored); Probo (penalty scored); Antonoglou (penalty scored); Ybarra (penalty scored) | | (penalty missed) Moshobane; (penalty scored) Dengler; (penalty scored) Crull; (penalty scored) Ndiaye; (penalty scored) Gasso |

| May 17, 2026 | Spokane Velocity FC | 1–0 | Las Vegas Lights FC | Spokane, Washington |
| 7:00 PM PDT | Vinyals 7' | Report | | Stadium: One Spokane Stadium; Attendance: 1,833; Referee: Steven Cardozo |

| June 6, 2026 | Las Vegas Lights FC | 0–2 | Oakland Roots SC | Las Vegas, Nevada |
| 7:30 PM PDT | | Report | de Vicente 41'; Lepley 59' | Stadium: Cashman Field; Attendance: 2,774; Referee: Jaclyn Metz |

| July 11, 2026 | Monterey Bay FC | 2–3 | Las Vegas Lights FC | Seaside, California |
| 7:00 PM PDT | Farnsworth 4'; Joseph 30' | Report | Okyere 71'; Anderson 85', 90+3' | Stadium: Cardinale Stadium; Attendance: 2,400; Referee: Ricardo Fierro |
