= Jonathan Suárez (soccer) =

American soccer player (born 1997)

Personal information
- Full name: Jonathan Suárez Cortés
- Date of birth: February 22, 1997 (age 29)
- Place of birth: Anaheim, California, United States
- Height: 5 ft 11 in (1.80 m)
- Position: Midfielder

Team information
- Current team: Defensores Unidos

Youth career
- 2015: Dock Sud
- 2015: Freamunde
- 2016–2017: Querétaro

Senior career*
Years	Team	Apps	(Gls)
2018–2021	Querétaro	13	(0)
2018	→ Cimarrones (loan)	12	(1)
2020–2021	→ Pumas Tabasco (loan)	19	(0)
2021	→ Orlando City (loan)	0	(0)
2021	Dorados	20	(1)
2022	Tijuana	1	(0)
2023–	Defensores Unidos	3	(0)

International career
2016	United States U20	1	(0)
- * Club domestic league appearances and goals as of 19:59, 8 July 2023 (UTC)

Jonathan Suárez Cortés (born February 22, 1997) is an American professional soccer player who plays as a midfielder for Argentine club Defensores Unidos.

== Early years ==
Suárez prepped at Fontana High School. He played as a forward for the school's soccer team, scoring 44 goals and 26 assists in 21 games as a senior to help win the Sunkist League title and was voted HS GameTime Boys Soccer Player of the Year in 2015. His 44-goal season broke the school scoring record previously set by future MLS great and United States international, Ante Razov.

== Club career ==
Following the final CIF game of the season, Suárez left school in April 2015 to sign with Dock Sud, a professional side in Argentina's third division. In July 2015, he moved to Portugal for a brief stint at second-tier Freamunde before signing with Liga MX side Querétaro in January 2016. Suárez began playing with the club's under-20 team, scoring 4 goals in 27 appearances.

In January 2018, Suárez joined Ascenso MX team Cimarrones de Sonora on loan for the rest of the 2017–18 season. He made his senior debut on January 9, 2018, as a 65th-minute substitute in a 3–0 Copa MX defeat to Atlético Morelia. He made his league debut for the team 11 days later, starting and playing 77 minutes in a 1–0 defeat to Atlético Zacatepec. Playing mostly as a winger, he made 15 appearances in all competitions for Sonora and scored one goal, the only goal in a 1–0 win over Celaya on January 26, 2018.

Upon his return to Querétaro, Suárez was left out of the first six Liga MX matchday squads but made his debut for the club as a 55th-minute substitute on August 1, 2018, in a 2–1 Copa MX defeat to Club León. He made his top-flight debut on August 26, 2018, in the 83rd-minute of a 2–0 win over Lobos BUAP. During the season he played a total of 342 minutes in 10 appearances for the first-team. He made a further 10 appearances for a combined 550 minutes in all competitions in the 2019–20 season.

With game time limited, Suárez joined U.N.A.M. on loan and was assigned to Pumas Tabasco, the club's Liga de Expansión MX affiliate for the 2020–21 season. He made 19 appearances including 18 starts, predominantly at left-back or defensive midfield, and was an unused substitute for U.N.A.M. first-team on four occasions.

On February 3, 2021, Suárez cut his Pumas loan short after he had the opportunity to join MLS side Orlando City on a season-long loan ahead of the 2021 campaign. On February 23, Suárez was arrested by the Osceola County Sheriff's Office on suspicion of the sexual assault of a woman in his Kissimmee apartment two days earlier. His brother, Rafael Suárez Jr., was also arrested. He was suspended by MLS the following day pending investigation and had his loan contract terminated by Orlando City later that week having never trained with the team. He was subsequently removed from the Querétaro roster. On April 22, Suárez was granted an adjustment to the conditions of his bond allowing him to return to Mexico. On May 27, the state attorney ruled the case against Suárez was not "suitable for prosecution" and dropped the charges.

In July 2021, Suárez joined Dorados de Sinaloa. In 2022 he had a spell at Club Tijuana, before joining Argentine club Defensores Unidos in June 2023.

== International career ==
In October 2016, Suárez was called up to the United States under-20 for the Four Nations invitational tournament held in England. He made one appearance as a substitute in a 5–3 defeat to the Netherlands.

== Career statistics ==
=== Club ===
As of April 11, 2022

Club	Season	League			Cup		Other		Total	
Club	Season	Division	Apps	Goals	Apps	Goals	Apps	Goals	Apps	Goals
Querétaro	2018–19	Liga MX	8	0	2	0	—		10	0
Querétaro	2019–20	Liga MX	5	0	5	0	—		10	0
Querétaro	Total		13	0	7	0	—		20	0
Cimarrones (loan)	2017–18	Ascenso MX	12	1	3	0	—		15	1
Pumas Tabasco (loan)	2020–21	Liga de Expansión MX	19	0	—		—		19	0
Dorados	2021–22	Liga de Expansión MX	20	1	—		—		20	1
Tijuana	2021–22	Liga MX	1	0	—		—		1	0
Career total			65	2	10	0	0	0	75	2
