= Pedro Gallese =

Peruvian footballer (born 1990)

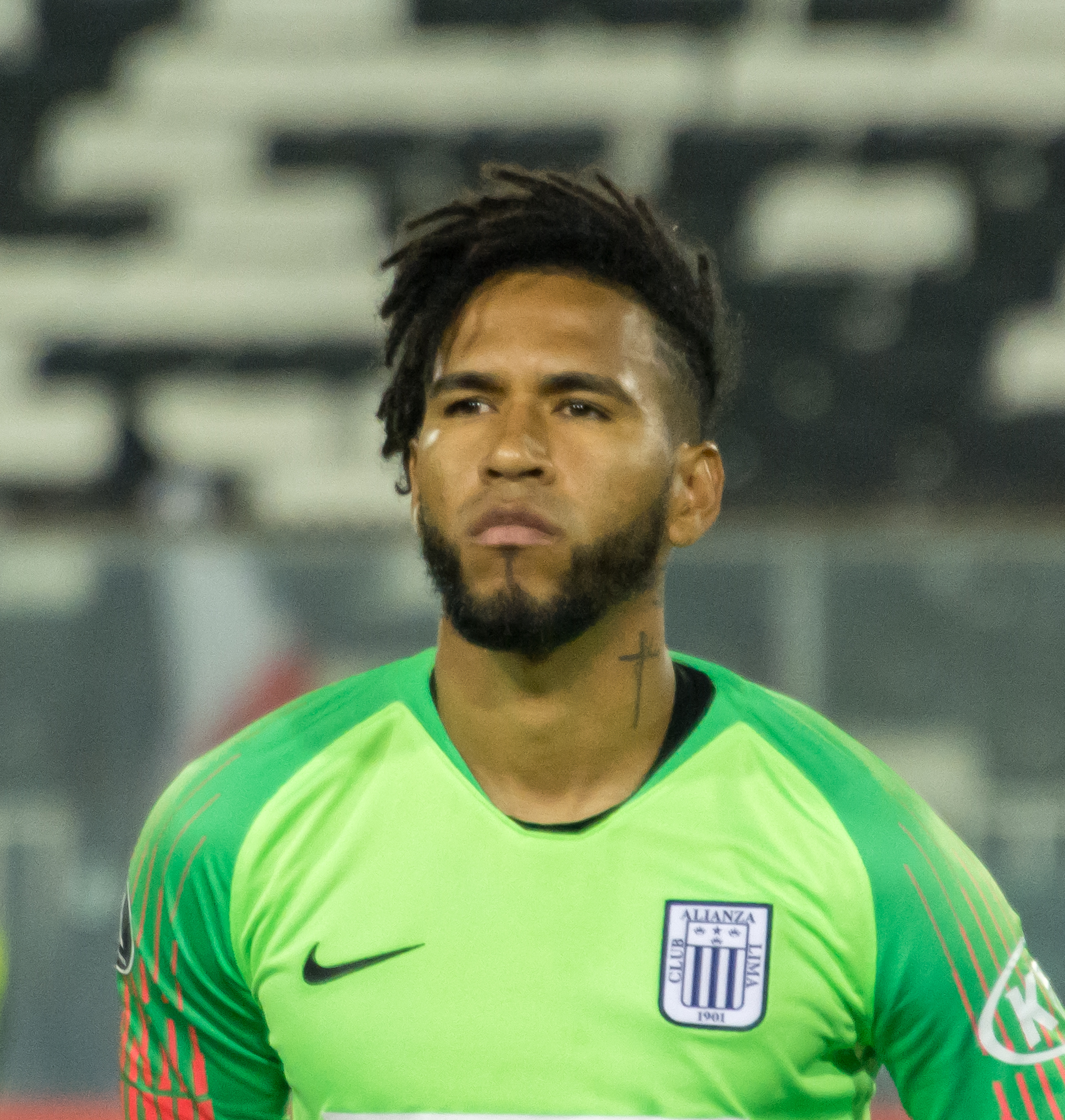
- Gallese with Alianza Lima in 2019

Personal information
- Full name: Pedro David Gallese Quiroz
- Date of birth: 23 February 1990 (age 36)
- Place of birth: Lima, Peru
- Height: 1.89 m (6 ft 2 in)
- Position: Goalkeeper

Team information
- Current team: Deportivo Cali
- Number: 1

Youth career
- 2000–2004: Academia Tito Drago
- 2005–2006: Club Deportivo Junior FC
- 2007–2008: Universidad San Martín

Senior career*
Years	Team	Apps	(Gls)
2008–2014	Universidad San Martín	49	(0)
2009	→ Atlético Minero (loan)	16	(0)
2014–2016	Juan Aurich	45	(0)
2016–2019	Veracruz	51	(0)
2019	→ Alianza Lima (loan)	26	(0)
2020–2025	Orlando City	164	(0)
2026–	Deportivo Cali	31	(0)

International career^{‡}
2007	Peru U17	2	(0)
2014–	Peru	131	(0)
Medal record
Men's football
Representing Peru
Copa América
Runner-up	2019 Brazil
Third place	2015 Chile
- * Club domestic league appearances and goals as of 04:18, 10 November 2026 (UTC) ‡ National team caps and goals as of 02:19, 14 November 2026 (UTC)

Pedro David Gallese Quiroz (born 23 February 1990) is a Peruvian professional footballer who plays as a goalkeeper for Categoría Primera A club Deportivo Cali and the Peru national team, which he captains.

== Club career ==
=== Universidad San Martín ===
Pedro Gallese began his youth career at Academia Tito Drago and Club Deportivo Junior FC before joining that academy at Universidad San Martín in 2007. He made his way through the youth system and debuted for the senior team on 25 June 2008 in a 4–0 victory against Atlético Minero. He made 63 appearances for the club and his performances earned him his first international call-up and eventual cap in 2014.

==== Loan to Atlético Minero ====
With his first team opportunities limited, Pedro Gallese joined Atlético Minero on loan for the 2009 season.

=== Juan Aurich ===
In 2015, Pedro Gallese decided to leave Universidad San Martín after 7 years at the club. Gallese signed for Juan Aurich and made his debut for the team on 6 February 2015 in a 2–1 win over Defensor La Bocana in the 2015 Torneo Descentralizado. Gallese played in the Copa Libertadores for the first time on 19 February 2015, making his continental debut in a 3–0 defeat to Tigres.

=== Veracruz ===
Gallese's performances in the Copa América Centenario in the United States in 2016 made him a target for several clubs. On 19 June 2016, Gallese eventually signed with Mexican club Veracruz. He made his debut for the team on 10 July in the 2016 Supercopa MX, losing the match against Guadalajara 2–0. In the first week of December 2019, Pedro Gallese was released by Veracruz after the club had been disaffiliated from Liga MX.

==== Loan to Alianza Lima ====
After falling out of favor under Veracruz manager Robert Siboldi the previous campaign, Gallese returned to Peru on a 12-month loan with Alianza Lima for the 2019 season. He was also named Peruvian player of the year in 2019 and 2021.

=== Orlando City ===
On 17 January 2020, Gallese joined Major League Soccer team Orlando City. He made his debut for the team in the season opener on 29 February, keeping a clean sheet in a 0–0 draw against Real Salt Lake. On 31 July 2020, Gallese made the only save during a quarter-final penalty shoot-out victory over Los Angeles FC in the MLS is Back Tournament. On 21 November 2020, Gallese was again involved in a penalty shoot-out as Orlando played their first MLS playoff game in history against New York City FC. Gallese appeared to successfully save the fifth penalty kick which would have won the match for Orlando but the play was overturned by VAR and Gallese received a second yellow card for leaving his goal line early having already been booked in extra-time for time wasting. Ultimately Orlando won the match after defender Rodrigo Schlegel replaced Gallese in goal and saved a penalty in the seventh round of the shootout.

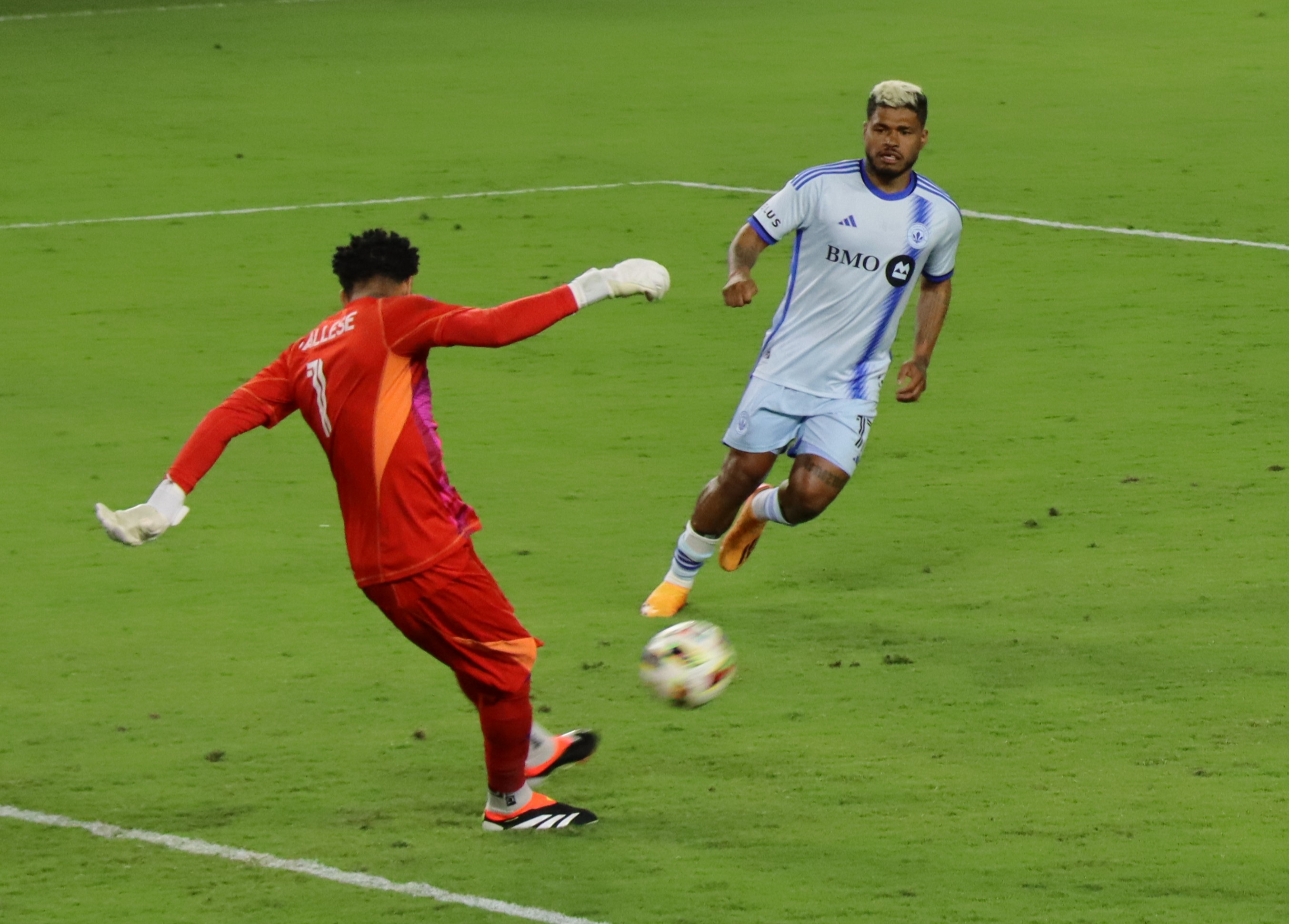
Gallese (red) clears a ball against CF Montréal in February 2024

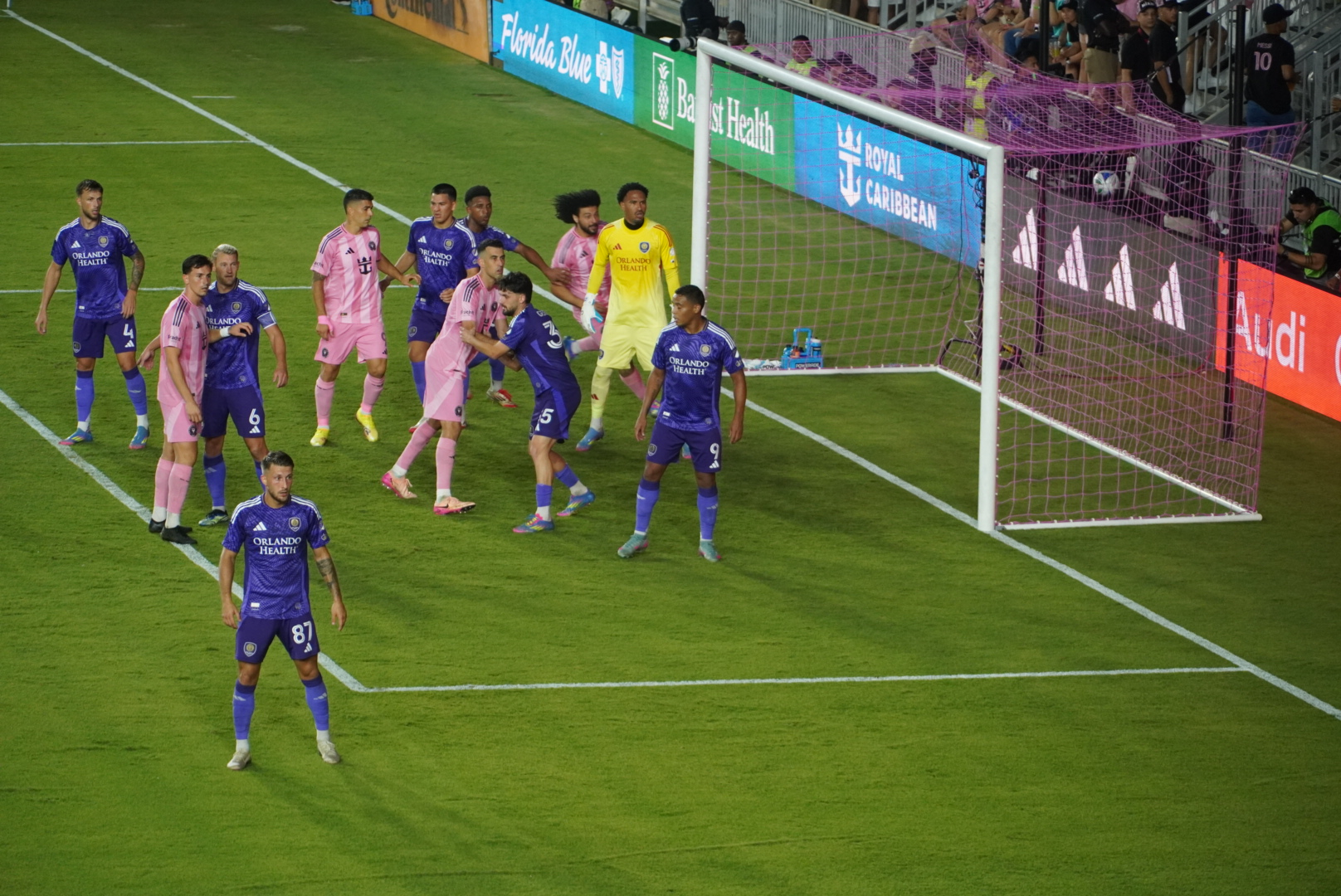
Gallese (yellow) defending a corner against Inter Miami in May 2025

In August 2021, Gallese was named an MLS All-Star for the 2021 MLS All-Star Game. On 20 October 2022, Gallese was voted the winner of the 2022 MLS Save of the Year Award for stopping Atlanta United's Dom Dwyer's shot on goal on 17 July, resulting in a 1–1 draw. In December, Gallese signed a new contract with Orlando through 2024, with an additional option for the 2025 season.

On 5 May 2025, Gallese was named to the Team of the Matchday for his performance in a goalless draw against Chicago Fire two days earlier. Gallese's clean sheet also meant that he extended the club record for the most consecutive clean sheets to five. Later the same month on 19 May, Gallese was once again named to the Team of the Matchday for securing a clean sheet and providing an assist on Luis Muriel's opening goal in a 3–0 win at rivals Inter Miami. On 28 July, Gallese was selected for the Team of the Matchday once again, this time for overcoming Columbus Crew's expected goal dominance as Orlando City defeated them 3–1 three days earlier. After the conclusion of the season, the team announced on 31 October that Gallese would be leaving at the end of his contract. Throughout his six season tenure at the team he became the most capped goalkeeper for the club and set club records for the most minutes played for a goalkeeper (18,188), most saves (568), wins (89), and clean sheets (57).

=== Deportivo Cali ===
Gallese decided to move to Colombia to continue his career at Liga DIMAYOR club Deportivo Cali, where he signed on 30 December 2025. Gallese made his debut on 18 January 2026 in the club's opening match, conceding a long distance shot to Cristián Álvarez in a 1–0 loss at Jaguares de Córdoba.

== International career ==
Pedro Gallese never appeared and was in reserve of Éder Hermoza of the Peru national under-17 football team for the 2007 FIFA U-17 World Cup held in South Korea.

Gallese made his senior international debut on 6 August 2014 in a friendly against Panama. He kept a clean sheet and saved a penalty in the 82nd minute of the 3–0 victory. Pedro Gallese was selected to the squad for the 2015 Copa América held in Chile, with Peru. They won the bronze medal. Gallese was also selected for the squad for the 2016 Copa América Centenario hosted in the United States. During the tournament he was named man of the match in Peru's defeat of Brazil, 1–0.

Pedro Gallese became first choice goalkeeper for Peru during 2018 World Cup qualifying. After having fractured his wrist during a Liga MX match with Veracruz in August 2017, Gallese returned for Peru on 5 October 2017. Despite still carrying the injury, Gallese shut out Argentina at La Bombonera with the 0–0 draw keeping Peru in the race to qualify for the 2018 FIFA World Cup. On 15 November 2017, Gallese was part of the team that qualified for the 2018 FIFA World Cup after Peru defeated New Zealand at the intercontinental playoff. His injury persisted but Gallese was able to keep a clean sheet in both games as Peru won 2–0 on aggregate, qualifying them for the World Cup for the first time in 36 years.

In May 2018, he was named in Peru's provisional squad and eventually made it into the final 23. He was the starting goalkeeper for Peru throughout the 2018 FIFA World Cup, but Peru were unable to qualify from the group stage of the tournament after two losses to Denmark and France. However, he was able to keep a clean sheet in their final group match, a 2–0 victory over Australia.

Gallese was once again selected as the starting goalkeeper for Peru in the 2019 Copa América, where he played a significant role in helping Peru to go to its first ever Copa América final for 44 years, including saving Luis Suárez's penalty in a quarter-final penalty shoot-out. Peru eventually lost to Brazil in the final 3–1.

On 12 October 2023, Gallese played his 100th international match for Peru in a 2–0 defeat against Chile during the 2026 FIFA World Cup qualification, to become the first Peruvian goalkeeper to achieve this feat.

== Personal life ==
In 2020, Gallese launched his own Peru-based clothing brand called Pedro Gallese colección, which features hats, masks, and t-shirts. In October 2020, Pedro Gallese colección began selling Black Lives Matter themed hats and t-shirts.

On 27 March 2023, a day before a friendly against Morocco, Gallese was taken into custody by the National Police following an altercation between Spanish police and Peruvian players and fans outside a hotel in Madrid. The police alleged that a player had punched a police officer in the eye during the scuffle, but refused to identify the player, although Peru's Ministry of Foreign Affairs confirmed Gallese had been taken into custody. According to the Directorate-General of the Civil Guard, Mercedes González Fernández, authorities had warned the Peruvian players to not go outside of the hotel to greet fans, but that they had anyway. Gallese was released by Spanish police after a few hours and was not charged in the incident.

== Career statistics ==
=== Club ===
As of match played 7 November 2026

Appearances and goals by club, season and competition
Club	Season	League			National cup		Continental		Playoffs		Other		Total	
Club	Season	Division	Apps	Goals	Apps	Goals	Apps	Goals	Apps	Goals	Apps	Goals	Apps	Goals
Universidad San Martín	2008	Peruvian Liga 1	1	0	0	0	—		—		—		1	0
Universidad San Martín	2009	Peruvian Liga 1	0	0	0	0	—		—		—		0	0
Universidad San Martín	2010	Peruvian Liga 1	2	0	0	0	0	0	—		—		2	0
Universidad San Martín	2011	Peruvian Liga 1	0	0	2	0	0	0	—		—		2	0
Universidad San Martín	2012	Peruvian Liga 1	4	0	0	0	0	0	—		—		4	0
Universidad San Martín	2013	Peruvian Liga 1	13	0	0	0	—		—		—		13	0
Universidad San Martín	2014	Peruvian Liga 1	29	0	12	0	—		—		—		41	0
Universidad San Martín	Total		49	0	14	0	0	0	0	0	0	0	63	0
Atlético Minero (loan)	2009	Peruvian Liga 1	16	0	0	0	—		—		—		16	0
Juan Aurich	2015	Peruvian Liga 1	30	0	7	0	6 (Note: Appearances in Copa Libertadores)	0	—		—		43	0
Juan Aurich	2016	Peruvian Liga 1	15	0	0	0	—		—		—		15	0
Juan Aurich	Total		45	0	7	0	6	0	0	0	0	0	58	0
Veracruz	2016–17	Liga MX	23	0	4	0	—		—		1 (Note: Appearance in Supercopa MX)	0	28	0
Veracruz	2017–18	Liga MX	15	0	—		—		—		—		15	0
Veracruz	2018–19	Liga MX	13	0	—		—		—		—		13	0
Veracruz	Total		51	0	4	0	0	0	0	0	1	0	56	0
Alianza Lima (loan)	2019	Peruvian Liga 1	26	0	0	0	6	0	—		—		32	0
Orlando City	2020	Major League Soccer	19	0	—		—		1	0	4 (Note: Appearances in MLS is Back Tournament knockout stage)	0	24	0
Orlando City	2021	Major League Soccer	22	0	—		—		1	0	—		23	0
Orlando City	2022	Major League Soccer	32	0	3	0	—		1	0	—		36	0
Orlando City	2023	Major League Soccer	30	0	0	0	2 (Note: Appearances in CONCACAF Champions League/Cup)	0	3	0	3 (Note: Appearances in Leagues Cup)	0	38	0
Orlando City	2024	Major League Soccer	29	0	—		3	0	5	0	3	0	40	0
Orlando City	2025	Major League Soccer	32	0	1	0	—		1	0	6	0	40	0
Orlando City	Total		164	0	4	0	5	0	12	0	16	0	201	0
Deportivo Cali	2026	Liga DIMAYOR	31	0	0	0	—		—		—		31	0
Career total			382	0	29	0	17	0	12	0	17	0	457	0

=== International ===
As of match played 14 November 2026

Appearances and goals by national team and year
National team	Year	Apps	Goals
Peru	2014	5	0
Peru	2015	12	0
Peru	2016	13	0
Peru	2017	7	0
Peru	2018	10	0
Peru	2019	15	0
Peru	2020	4	0
Peru	2021	17	0
Peru	2022	10	0
Peru	2023	10	0
Peru	2024	11	0
Peru	2025	9	0
Peru	2026	8	0
Total		131	0

== Honours ==
Universidad San Martín

- Peruvian Primera Division: 2008, 2010
- Torneo del Inca runner-up: 2014

Orlando City

- U.S. Open Cup: 2022

Peru

- Copa América third place: 2015
- Copa América second place: 2019

Individual

- MLS All-Star: 2021
- MLS Save of the Year: 2022

== See also ==
- List of men's footballers with 100 or more international caps
