= 2015 Orlando City SC season =

Orlando City SC
2015 season
- President: Phil Rawlins
- Manager: Adrian Heath
- Stadium: Orlando Citrus Bowl
- MLS: Conference: 7th Overall: 14th
- MLS Playoffs: Did not qualify
- U.S. Open Cup: Quarterfinals
- Top goalscorer: League: Larin (17); All: Larin (18)
- Highest home attendance: 62,510 vs NYCFC (Mar. 8)
- Lowest home attendance: 22,241 vs Kansas City (Sept. 13)
- Average home league attendance: 32,847
| Home colors | Away colors |

The 2015 Orlando City SC season was the club's fifth season of existence in Orlando and first in Major League Soccer, the top-flight league in the United States soccer league system.

== Background ==
On November 19, 2013, it was announced that Orlando City would be the next expansion franchise in Major League Soccer, the league's 21st team. The dissolution of C.D. Chivas USA following the 2014 MLS season resulted in Orlando City instead being the league's 20th franchise.

Following the completion of City's final season in USL Pro, the team released all but nine players from its roster. The remaining players, who would form the base of the 2015 roster, included Kaká, who was placed on loan with São Paulo FC in his native Brazil following his signing in June 2014.

On September 24, 2014, Orlando City manager Adrian Heath and New York City FC manager Jason Kreis took part in a draw to determine who would get top priorities in various selection mechanisms, including the 2014 MLS Expansion Draft and the 2015 MLS SuperDraft. Orlando City won the draw, and Adrian Heath selected the top pick in the Expansion Draft first. He would also choose the top pick in the SuperDraft, top selection priority for USL Pro and NASL players (beyond Orlando City's own USL Pro players, which the team had right of first refusal to), and second-to-last (then #20, now #19) in lottery ranking. Orlando City will be #2 in United States men's national soccer team player allocation ranking, #21 (now #20) in player discovery ranking, #21 (now #20) in re-entry draft ranking, and #2 in designated player ranking.

On October 17, 2014, the team broke ground on their new soccer-specific stadium. Due to delays in sales tax subsidies from the Florida Legislature, the team decided to assume stadium financing themselves, and committed to pay back the City of Orlando for the land purchased and any other costs already incurred. Orlando City played the 2015 season, and will play the entire 2016 season, in the remodeled Orlando Citrus Bowl Stadium.

For normal regular-season matches in 2015, Orlando City will open the sidelines and ends of the lower bowl only, except for the corners, along with the luxury suites. For the season opener on March 8 against New York City FC, however, the entire stadium was made available for sale. The team announced that the stadium's entire allotment of permanent seating was sold out on March 2. The team made 2,000 standing room only tickets available on March 4, and those sold out within 24 hours.

On November 14, 2014, Orlando City was drawn for the seventh pick in the dispersal draft for Chivas USA players, but chose to pass on their pick. Manager Adrian Heath signed a contract extension on November 21, 2014, committing him to the club through to the end of the 2017 MLS season.

Orlando City originally planned to train in late January in Brazil, but eventually cancelled those plans in favor of training in Orlando. They will instead train at Sylvan Lake Park in Sanford.

Orlando City opened the 2015 MLS season at the Citrus Bowl against the other expansion team for that season, New York City FC. The match ended in a 1–1 draw after Kaká scored an equalizer in the first minute of second half stoppage time. The attendance of 62,510 was the largest crowd to see a soccer match at the Citrus Bowl, the second-largest attendance ever for an MLS team's inaugural home match, and the ninth-largest crowd in MLS history for a standalone match.

== Roster ==
Last updated on August 6, 2015

| No. | Nationality | Name | Position(s) | Date of birth (age) | Previous club | Notes |
Goalkeepers
| 22 | (United States) | Tally Hall | GK | May 12, 1985 (aged 29) | (United States) Houston Dynamo | – |
| 36 | (United States) | Earl Edwards, Jr. | GK | January 24, 1992 (aged 23) | (United States) UCLA Bruins | – |
| 42 | (United States) | Josh Ford | GK | November 6, 1987 (aged 27) | (United States) Seattle Sounders FC | – |
Defenders
| 2 | (United States) | Tyler Turner | RB | March 4, 1996 (aged 19) | (United States) IMG Academy Bradenton | HGP |
| 3 | (England) | Seb Hines | CB | May 29, 1988 (aged 26) | (England) Middlesbrough | Loan in |
| 14 | (England) | Luke Boden | LB | November 26, 1988 (aged 26) | (England) Sheffield Wednesday | – |
| 16 | (United States) | Corey Ashe | LB | March 14, 1986 (aged 28) | (United States) Houston Dynamo | – |
| 20 | (United States) | Brek Shea | LB/LW | February 28, 1990 (aged 25) | (England) Stoke City | – |
| 23 | (United States) | Conor Donovan | CB | January 8, 1996 (aged 19) | (United States) NC State Wolfpack | GA |
| 27 | (Portugal) | Rafael Ramos | RB | January 9, 1995 (aged 20) | (Portugal) S.L. Benfica U-19 | INT |
| 29 | (United States) | Tommy Redding | CB | January 24, 1997 (aged 18) | (United States) FC America | HGP |
| 44 | (Spain) | David Mateos | CB | April 22, 1987 (aged 27) | (Hungary) Ferencvárosi TC | INT |
| 78 | (France) | Aurélien Collin | CB | March 8, 1986 (aged 29) | (United States) Sporting Kansas City | – |
Midfielders
| 5 | (United States) | Servando Carrasco | MF | August 13, 1988 (aged 26) | (United States) Sporting Kansas City | – |
| 6 | (United States) | Tony Cascio | LW/RW | March 28, 1990 (aged 24) | (United States) Colorado Rapids | – |
| 7 | (Colombia) | Cristian Higuita | AM | January 14, 1994 (aged 21) | (Colombia) Deportivo Cali | INT |
| 8 | (England) | Harrison Heath | CM/DM | April 16, 1996 (aged 18) | (England) Norwich City U-18 | HGP |
| 10 | (Brazil) | Kaká (captain) | AM | April 22, 1982 (aged 32) | (Italy) AC Milan | INT, DP |
| 12 | (United States) | Eric Avila | MF | November 24, 1987 (aged 27) | (Mexico) Santos Laguna | Loan in |
| 15 | (Brazil) | Pedro Ribeiro | AM/SS | June 13, 1990 (aged 24) | (United States) Philadelphia Union | – |
| 17 | (El Salvador) | Darwin Cerén | CM | December 31, 1989 (aged 25) | (El Salvador) Juventud Independiente | – |
| 18 | (Trinidad and Tobago) | Kevin Molino | AM/RW | June 17, 1990 (aged 24) | (Trinidad and Tobago) Ma Pau SC | – |
| 24 | (England) | Lewis Neal | LM | July 14, 1981 (aged 33) | (United States) D.C. United | – |
| 32 | (Switzerland) | Adrian Winter | AM | July 8, 1986 (aged 28) | (Switzerland) FC Luzern | INT |
| 55 | (Angola) | Estrela | DM | September 22, 1995 (aged 19) | (Portugal) S.L. Benfica U-19 | INT |
Forwards
| 11 | (Colombia) | Carlos Rivas | FW/LW | April 15, 1994 (aged 20) | (Colombia) Deportivo Cali | INT, DP |
| 19 | (Democratic Republic of the Congo) | Danny Mwanga | FW | July 17, 1991 (aged 23) | (United States) Colorado Rapids | – |
| 21 | (Canada) | Cyle Larin | FW | April 17, 1995 (aged 19) | (United States) Connecticut Huskies | GA, INT |
| 25 | (United States) | Adam Bedell | FW | December 1, 1991 (aged 23) | (United States) Columbus Crew SC | – |
| 26 | (Puerto Rico) | Sidney Rivera | FW | November 15, 1993 (aged 21) | (United States) Old Dominion Monarchs | – |
| 35 | (Honduras) | Bryan Róchez | FW | January 1, 1995 (aged 20) | (Honduras) Real España | INT, DP |

== Competitions ==
=== Friendlies ===
| January 30 | **Orlando City** | **1–1** | **D.C. United** | Bradenton, Florida |
| 7:00 pm. EST | Rivas 67' | | Pontius 14' | Stadium: IMG Academy Stadium |

| February 4 | **Orlando City** | **4–0** | **FC Dallas** | Davenport, Florida |
| 2:00 pm. EST | Cascio 13'; Paterson 20'; Kaká 33' (pen.); Mwanga 64' | | | Stadium: ChampionsGate Sports Field Complex; Attendance: Closed scrimmage |

| February 8 | **Orlando City** | **0–0** | **Toronto FC** | Sanford, Florida |
| 3:30 pm. EST | | | | Stadium: Sylvan Lake Park; Attendance: Closed scrimmage |

| February 13 | **Orlando City** | **2–2** | **BK Häcken** | Sanford, Florida |
| 2:00 pm. EST | Molino; Hines | Report | Berggren; Ericsson (pen.) | Stadium: Sylvan Lake Park; Attendance: Closed scrimmage |

| February 21 Carolina Challenge Cup | **New York City FC** | **1–1** | **Orlando City** | Charleston, South Carolina |
| 7:30 pm. EST | Shelton 56' | Report | Kaká 31' | Stadium: Blackbaud Stadium |

| February 25 Carolina Challenge Cup | **Charleston Battery** | **1–1** | **Orlando City** | Charleston, South Carolina |
| 7:30 pm. EST | Boyd 26' | Report | Shea 10' | Stadium: Blackbaud Stadium |
Note: Match abandoned early due to weather

| February 28 Carolina Challenge Cup | **Orlando City** | **0–3** | **Houston Dynamo** | Charleston, South Carolina |
| 5:00 pm. EST | | Report | Bruin 27'; Davis 30'; Miranda 45' | Stadium: Blackbaud Stadium |

| May 2 | **Orlando City** | **3–2** | **Ponte Preta** | Orlando, Florida |
| 7:30 pm. EDT | Róchez 45+1'; St. Ledger 55'; Larin 90+2' (pen.) | Report | Tiago Alves 11'; Renato Cajá 59' | Stadium: Citrus Bowl; Attendance: 20,501 |

| July 15 | **Orlando City** | **3–1** | **West Bromwich Albion** | Orlando, Florida |
| 7:30 pm. EDT | Kaká 45+2'; Rivas 49'; Róchez 87' | Report | McManaman 14' | Stadium: Citrus Bowl; Attendance: 15,172 |

| November 15 | **Flamengo** | **1–0** | **Orlando City** | Rio de Janeiro, Brazil |
| 11:30 pm. EDT | Luiz Antônio 67' | Report | | Stadium: Estádio do Maracanã; Attendance: 12,371 |

=== Major League Soccer ===
All times in regular season on Eastern Daylight Time (UTC-04:00)

==== Results summary ====
| Overall | | | | | | | | Home | | | | | | Away | | | | | |
| Pld | W | D | L | GF | GA | GD | Pts | W | D | L | GF | GA | GD | W | D | L | GF | GA | GD |
|---|---|---|---|---|---|---|---|---|---|---|---|---|---|---|---|---|---|---|---|
| 34 | 12 | 8 | 14 | 46 | 56 | −10 | 44 | 7 | 5 | 5 | 25 | 19 | +6 | 5 | 3 | 9 | 21 | 37 | −16 |

Source: Match reports

| Round | 1 | 2 | 3 | 4 | 5 | 6 | 7 | 8 | 9 | 10 | 11 | 12 | 13 | 14 | 15 | 16 | 17 | 18 | 19 | 20 | 21 | 22 | 23 | 24 | 25 | 26 | 27 | 28 | 29 | 30 | 31 | 32 | 33 | 34 |
|---|---|---|---|---|---|---|---|---|---|---|---|---|---|---|---|---|---|---|---|---|---|---|---|---|---|---|---|---|---|---|---|---|---|---|
| Stadium | H | A | H | A | H | A | A | H | H | A | H | A | H | A | H | A | H | A | H | H | A | H | A | H | A | A | H | A | H | A | A | H | H | A |
| Result | D | W | L | D | L | W | L | L | D | L | W | D | D | W | W | L | W | D | L | L | L | W | L | D | L | L | D | L | W | W | W | W | W | L |

Source: Match reports
A = Away; H = Home; W = Win; D = Draw; L = Loss

==== Results ====
| March 8 1 | **Orlando City** | **1–1** | **New York City FC** | Orlando, Florida |
| 5:00 p.m. | Shea (yellow card) 29'; Molino (yellow card) 40'; Higuita (yellow card) 78'; Collin (red card) 83'; Kaká 90+1' | Report | Ballouchy (yellow card) 41'; Hernandez (yellow card) 54'; Brovsky (yellow card) 60'; Diskerud 76' | Stadium: Citrus Bowl; Attendance: 62,510; Referee: (Republic of Ireland) Alan Kelly |

| March 13 2 | **Houston Dynamo** | **0–1** | **Orlando City** | Houston, Texas |
| 7:00 p.m. | Sarkodie (yellow card) 34' | Report | Okugo (yellow card) 46'; Deric 74' (o.g.) | Stadium: BBVA Compass Stadium; Attendance: 22,407; Referee: (United States) Chris Penso |

| March 21 3 | **Orlando City** | **0–1** | **Vancouver Whitecaps FC** | Orlando, Florida |
| 7:30 p.m. | Okugo (yellow card) 78' | Report | Koffie (yellow card) 22'; Adekugbe (yellow card) 36'; Rivero (yellow card) 44'; Manneh (yellow card) 65'; Harvey (yellow card) 90+5'; Rivero 90+6' | Stadium: Citrus Bowl; Attendance: 31,072; Referee: Jorge Gonazalez |

| March 28 4 | **Montreal Impact** | **2–2** | **Orlando City** | Montreal, Quebec |
| | Piatti 14' (pen.); McInerney 27' | Report | Ribeiro 29'; Kaká 30' | Stadium: Olympic Stadium; Attendance: 25,245; Referee: Ted Unkel |

| April 3 5 | **Orlando City** | **0–1** | **D.C. United** | Orlando, Florida |
| 7:00 pm | | Report | Silva 90+1' | Stadium: Citrus Bowl; Attendance: 32,822; Referee: Chris Penso |

| April 12 6 | **Portland Timbers** | **0–2** | **Orlando City** | Portland, Oregon |
| 5:00 p.m. | | Report | Larin 30'; Kaká 85' (pen.) | Stadium: Providence Park; Attendance: 21,144; Referee: (United States) Kevin Stott |

| April 18 7 | **Columbus Crew** | **3–0** | **Orlando City** | Columbus, Ohio |
| 7:30 p.m. | Higuaín 32'; Meram 55'; Kamara 60' | Report | Ramos (red card) 34' | Stadium: Columbus Crew Stadium; Attendance: 15,655; Referee: Ricardo Salazar |

| April 26 8 | **Orlando City** | **0–2** | **Toronto FC** | Orlando, Florida |
| 7:00 p.m. | | Report | Altidore 50', 83' | Stadium: Citrus Bowl; Attendance: 30,908; Referee: Jose Carlos Rivero |

| May 8 9 | **Orlando City** | **2–2** | **New England Revolution** | Orlando, Florida |
| 8:00 pm | Larin 75'; Collin 90' | Report | Davies 19'; Rowe 71' | Stadium: Citrus Bowl; Attendance: 27,243; Referee: Ted Unkel |

| May 13 10 | **D.C. United** | **2–1** | **Orlando City** | Washington, D.C. |
| 8:00 p.m. | Opare 70'; Rolfe 79' | Report | Larin 11' | Stadium: RFK Stadium; Attendance: 12,532; Referee: Jorge Gonzalez |

| May 17 11 | **Orlando City** | **4–0** | **LA Galaxy** | Orlando, Florida |
| 5:00 pm | Avila 12'; Larin 34'; Kaká 56' (pen.); Cerén 73' | Report | | Stadium: Citrus Bowl; Attendance: 40,122; Referee: Jair Maruffo |

| May 24 12 | **San Jose Earthquakes** | **1–1** | **Orlando City** | Santa Clara, California |
| 7:00 p.m. | Wondolowski 68' (pen.) | Report | Shea (red card) 51'; Kaká 64' (pen.) | Stadium: Levi's Stadium; Attendance: 36,224; Referee: Allen Chapman |

| May 30 13 | **Orlando City** | **2–2** | **Columbus Crew** | Orlando, Florida |
| 7:30 pm | Kaká 17' (pen.); Ribeiro 89' | Report | Tchani 6'; Parkhurst (red card) 16'; Kamara 61' | Stadium: Citrus Bowl; Attendance: 31,430; Referee: Silviu Petrescu |

| June 6 14 | **Chicago Fire** | **2–3** | **Orlando City** | Bridgeview, Illinois |
| 8:30 p.m. | Igboananike 9'; Accam 57' | Report | Adaílton 40', 86' (o.g.); Larin 82' | Stadium: Toyota Park; Attendance: 20,124; Referee: Juan Guzman |

| June 14 15 | **Orlando City** | **1–0** | **D.C. United** | Orlando, Florida |
| 7:00 p.m. | Kaká 30' | Report | | Stadium: Citrus Bowl; Attendance: 30,054; Referee: Jose Carlos Rivero |

| June 20 16 | **Montreal Impact** | **2–0** | **Orlando City** | Montreal, Quebec |
| 8:00 p.m. | Toia 36'; Oduro 90+3' | Report | | Stadium: Saputo Stadium; Attendance: 17,820; Referee: Edvin Jurisevic |

| June 24 17 | **Orlando City** | **2–0** | **Colorado Rapids** | Orlando, Florida |
| 7:30 p.m. | Larin 62'; Kaká 65' | Report | | Stadium: Citrus Bowl; Attendance: 23,372; Referee: Silviu Petrescu |

| July 4 18 | **Real Salt Lake** | **1–1** | **Orlando City** | Sandy, Utah |
| 10:00 p.m. | Sebastián Jaime 28' | | Kaká 5' | Stadium: Rio Tinto Stadium; Attendance: 20,956; Referee: Sorin Stoica |

| July 11 19 | **Orlando City** | **0–2** | **FC Dallas** | Orlando, Florida |
| 7:30 p.m. | | Report | Díaz 45+1' (pen.); Texeira 64' | Stadium: Citrus Bowl; Attendance: 30,513; Referee: Juan Guzman |

| July 19 20 | **Orlando City** | **0–2** | **New York Red Bulls** | Orlando, Florida |
| 7:00 p.m. | | Report | Kljestan 21'; Grella 90+1' | Stadium: Citrus Bowl; Attendance: 33,518; Referee: Fotis Bazakos |

| July 26 21 | **New York City FC** | **5–3** | **Orlando City** | New York, New York |
| 2:30 p.m. | Villa 45', 67'; Calle 53'; McNamara 71'; Diskerud 90+3' | Report | Larin 50', 61', 85' | Stadium: Yankee Stadium; Attendance: 32,041; Referee: Alan Kelly |

| August 1 22 | **Orlando City** | **5–2** | **Columbus Crew** | Orlando, Florida |
| 7:30 p.m. | Larin 18', 53'; Cerén 38'; Collin 77'; Higuita 85' | Report | Higuaín 5'; Collin 90+1' (o.g.) | Stadium: Citrus Bowl; Attendance: 26,586; Referee: Ricardo Salazar |

| August 5 23 | **Toronto FC** | **4–1** | **Orlando City** | Toronto, Ontario |
| | Giovinco 12' (pen.), 56', 88'; Warner 81' | Report | Boden 17' | Stadium: BMO Field; Attendance: 26,648; Referee: Silviu Petrescu |

| August 8 24 | **Orlando City** | **0–0** | **Philadelphia Union** | Orlando, Florida |
| 7:30 p.m. | | Report | | Stadium: Citrus Bowl; Attendance: 28,495; Referee: Allen Chapman |

| August 16 25 | **Seattle Sounders FC** | **4–0** | **Orlando City** | Seattle, Washington |
| 5:00 p.m. | Martins 17', 62'; Valdez 59'; Thomás 90+2' | Report | | Stadium: CenturyLink Field; Attendance: 40,453; Referee: Kevin Stott |

| August 22 26 | **Toronto FC** | **5–0** | **Orlando City** | Toronto, Ontario |
| 4:00 p.m. | Delgado 46'; Giovinco 57'; Morrow 71'; Altidore 83', 85' (pen.) | | | Stadium: BMO Field; Attendance: 26,397; Referee: Jose Rivero |

| August 29 27 | **Orlando City** | **1–1** | **Chicago Fire** | Orlando, Florida |
| 7:30 p.m. | Gehrig 37' (o.g.) | Report | Accam 30' | Stadium: Citrus Bowl; Attendance: 28,921; Referee: Baldomero Toledo |

| September 5 28 | **New England Revolution** | **3–0** | **Orlando City** | Foxborough, Massachusetts |
| 7:30 p.m. | Fagúndez 43'; Agudelo 84'; Tierney 90+4' | Report | | Stadium: Gillette Stadium; Attendance: 18,854; Referee: Mark Geiger |

| September 13 29 | **Orlando City** | **3–1** | **Sporting Kansas City** | Orlando, Florida |
| 7:00 p.m. | Winter 3', 72'; Róchez 66' | Report | Németh 59' | Stadium: Citrus Bowl; Attendance: 22,241; Referee: Jair Maruffo |

| September 19 30 | **Chicago Fire** | **0–1** | **Orlando City** | Bridgeview, Illinois |
| 8:30 p.m. | | Report | Róchez 86' | Stadium: Toyota Park; Attendance: 20,280; Referee: Alan Kelly |

| September 25 31 | **New York Red Bulls** | **2–5** | **Orlando City** | Harrison, New Jersey |
| 7:00 p.m. | McCarty 29'; Sam 58' | Report | Larin 24', 43', 61'; Perrinelle 46' (o.g.); Róchez 90+3' | Stadium: Red Bull Arena; Attendance: 20,695; Referee: Jorge Gonzalez |

| October 3 32 | **Orlando City** | **2–1** | **Montreal Impact** | Orlando, Florida |
| 7:30 p.m. | Larin 33'; Hines 80' | Report | Oduro 43' | Stadium: Citrus Bowl; Attendance: 35,421; Referee: Edvin Jurisevic |

| October 16 33 | **Orlando City** | **2–1** | **New York City FC** | Orlando, Florida |
| 7:00 p.m. | Larin 62', 70' | Report | Watson-Siriboe 45+2' | Stadium: Citrus Bowl; Attendance: 43,179; Referee: Allen Chapman |

| October 25 34 | **Philadelphia Union** | **1–0** | **Orlando City** | Chester, Pennsylvania |
| 5:00 p.m. | Le Toux 41' (pen.) | Report | | Stadium: PPL Park; Attendance: 17,309; Referee: Chris Penso |

==== Standings ====
Eastern Conference table

| Pos | Team | Pld | W | L | T | GF | GA | GD | Pts | Qualification |
|---|---|---|---|---|---|---|---|---|---|---|
| 1 | New York Red Bulls | 34 | 18 | 10 | 6 | 62 | 43 | +19 | 60 | MLS Cup Conference Semifinals |
| 2 | Columbus Crew | 34 | 15 | 11 | 8 | 58 | 53 | +5 | 53 | MLS Cup Conference Semifinals |
| 3 | Montreal Impact | 34 | 15 | 13 | 6 | 48 | 44 | +4 | 51 | MLS Cup Knockout Round |
| 4 | D.C. United | 34 | 15 | 13 | 6 | 43 | 45 | −2 | 51 | MLS Cup Knockout Round |
| 5 | New England Revolution | 34 | 14 | 12 | 8 | 48 | 47 | +1 | 50 | MLS Cup Knockout Round |
| 6 | Toronto FC | 34 | 15 | 15 | 4 | 58 | 58 | 0 | 49 | MLS Cup Knockout Round |
| **7** | Orlando City SC | **34** | **12** | **14** | **8** | **46** | **56** | **−10** | 44 | |
| 8 | New York City FC | 34 | 10 | 17 | 7 | 49 | 58 | −9 | 37 | |
| 9 | Philadelphia Union | 34 | 10 | 17 | 7 | 42 | 55 | −13 | 37 | |
| 10 | Chicago Fire | 34 | 8 | 20 | 6 | 43 | 58 | −15 | 30 | |

Source: MLS

Overall table

| Pos | Team | Pld | W | L | T | GF | GA | GD | Pts |
|---|---|---|---|---|---|---|---|---|---|
| 12 | Toronto FC | 34 | 15 | 15 | 4 | 58 | 58 | 0 | **49** |
| 13 | San Jose Earthquakes | 34 | 13 | 13 | 8 | 41 | 39 | +2 | **47** |
| **14** | Orlando City SC | **34** | **12** | **14** | **8** | **46** | **56** | **−10** | **44** |
| 15 | Houston Dynamo | 34 | 11 | 14 | 9 | 42 | 49 | −7 | **42** |
| 16 | Real Salt Lake | 34 | 11 | 15 | 8 | 38 | 48 | −10 | **41** |

Source: MLS
Rules for classification: 1) points; 2) total wins; 3) total goal differential; 4) total goals scored

=== U.S. Open Cup ===
Orlando City entered the 2015 U.S. Open Cup with the rest of Major League Soccer in the fourth round.

Bracket

Fourth round June 16–17
**MLS** | **New York Red Bulls** | **3**
NASL | Atlanta Silverbacks | 0
**NASL** | **New York Cosmos** | **2(4)**
MLS | New York City FC | 2(3)
**MLS** | **Philadelphia Union** | **0(3)**
USL | Rochester Rhinos | 0(1)
USL | Pittsburgh Riverhounds | 1
**MLS** | **D.C. United** | **3***
**MLS** | **Chicago Fire** | **1***
USL | Louisville City FC | 0
MLS | New England Revolution | 0
**USL** | **Charlotte Independence** | **1**
USL | Charleston Battery | 4(7)
**MLS** | **Orlando City SC** | **4(8)**
USL | Richmond Kickers | 1
**MLS** | **Columbus Crew** | **3**
**MLS** | **Sporting Kansas City** | **1**
USL | Saint Louis FC | 0
**MLS** | **FC Dallas** | **4**
USL | Oklahoma City Energy FC | 1
**MLS** | **Houston Dynamo** | **2**
USL | Austin Aztex | 0
**MLS** | **Colorado Rapids** | **4**
USL | Colorado Springs Switchbacks | 1
**MLS** | **Real Salt Lake** | **2**
USL | Seattle Sounders FC 2 | 1
MLS | Seattle Sounders FC | 1
**MLS** | **Portland Timbers** | **3***
**MLS** | **San Jose Earthquakes** | **2(6)**
USL | Sacramento Republic FC | 2(5)
**MLS** | **LA Galaxy** | **6**
USASA | PSA Elite | 1

Round of 16; June 30–July 1
**MLS** | **New York Red Bulls** | **4**
NASL | New York Cosmos | 1
**MLS** | **Philadelphia Union** | **2**
MLS | D.C. United | 1
**MLS** | **Chicago Fire** | **3**
USL | Charlotte Independence | 1
**MLS** | **Orlando City SC** | **2**
MLS | Columbus Crew | 0
**MLS** | **Sporting Kansas City** | **6**
MLS | FC Dallas | 2
**MLS** | **Houston Dynamo** | **1**
MLS | Colorado Rapids | 0
**MLS** | **Real Salt Lake** | **2**
MLS | Portland Timbers | 0
MLS | San Jose Earthquakes | 0
**MLS** | **LA Galaxy** | **1**

Quarterfinals; July 14–22
MLS | New York Red Bulls | 1(3)
**MLS** | **Philadelphia Union** | **1(4)**
**MLS** | **Chicago Fire** | **3**
MLS | Orlando City SC | 1
**MLS** | **Sporting Kansas City** | **3**
MLS | Houston Dynamo | 1
**MLS** | **Real Salt Lake** | **1**
MLS | LA Galaxy | 0

Semifinals; August 12
**MLS** | **Philadelphia Union** | **1**
MLS | Chicago Fire | 0
**MLS** | **Sporting Kansas City** | **3**
MLS | Real Salt Lake | 1

Final; September 30
MLS | Philadelphia Union | 1(6)
**MLS** | **Sporting Kansas City** | **1(7)**

- Host team listed first
- **Bold** = winner
- * = after extra time, ( ) = penalty shootout score

| June 17 Fourth round | **Charleston Battery (South Carolina)** | **4–4** (a.e.t.) (**7–8** p) | **(Florida) Orlando City** | Charleston, South Carolina |
| 7:30 pm EDT | van Schaik 58'; Kelly 66'; Portillo 105', 115' (pen.) | Recap | Neal 64'; Rivas 75' (pen.), 95' (pen.), 105' (pen.) | Stadium: Blackbaud Stadium; Attendance: 3,459 |
| | **Penalties** |
| | Portillo (penalty scored); Adjetey (penalty scored); Marini (penalty missed); Prince (penalty missed); van Schaik (penalty scored); Chang (penalty scored); Cordovés (penalty scored); Kelly (penalty scored); Ferguson (penalty scored); Mueller (penalty missed) | | (penalty missed) Rivas; (penalty scored) Ribeiro; (penalty missed) Neal; (penalty scored) St Ledger; (penalty scored) Okugo; (penalty scored) Ramos; (penalty scored) Heath; (penalty scored) Boden; (penalty scored) Hines; (penalty scored) Mwanga |

| June 30 Round of 16 | **Orlando City (Florida)** | **2–0** | **(Ohio) Columbus Crew** | Orlando, Florida |
| 7:30 pm EDT | Kaka 21'; Rivas 35' | Report | | Stadium: Orlando Citrus Bowl Stadium; Attendance: 13,684 |

| July 22 Quarterfinal | **Chicago Fire (Illinois)** | **3–1** | **(Florida) Orlando City** | Bridgeview, Illinois |
| 8:30 pm EDT | Nyarko 3'; Igboananike 87', 90' | Report | Larin 56' | Stadium: Toyota Park; Attendance: 4,723; Referee: Edvin Jurisevic |

== Player statistics ==
=== Appearances ===
As of match played October 25, 2015

Starting appearances are listed first, followed by substitute appearances after the + symbol where applicable.

| No. | Pos | Nat | Player | Total | | MLS | | Open Cup | |
| No. | Pos | Nat | Player | Apps | Goals | Apps | Goals | Apps | Goals |
Goalkeepers
| 22 | GK | (United States) USA | Tally Hall | 25 | 0 | 23 | 0 | 2 | 0 |
| 36 | GK | (United States) USA | Earl Edwards Jr. | 1 | 0 | 0 | 0 | 1 | 0 |
Defenders
| 2 | DF | (United States) USA | Tyler Turner | 8 | 0 | 5+2 | 0 | 1 | 0 |
| 3 | DF | (England) ENG | Seb Hines | 26 | 1 | 21+2 | 1 | 3 | 0 |
| 14 | DF | (England) ENG | Luke Boden | 28 | 1 | 24+1 | 1 | 3 | 0 |
| 16 | DF | (United States) USA | Corey Ashe | 9 | 0 | 8+1 | 0 | 0 | 0 |
| 20 | DF | (United States) USA | Brek Shea | 19 | 0 | 17+2 | 0 | 0 | 0 |
| 23 | DF | (United States) USA | Conor Donovan | 2 | 0 | 1 | 0 | 1 | 0 |
| 27 | DF | (Portugal) POR | Rafael Ramos | 28 | 0 | 24+1 | 0 | 2+1 | 0 |
| 29 | DF | (United States) USA | Tommy Redding | 2 | 0 | 1+1 | 0 | 0 | 0 |
| 44 | DF | (Spain) ESP | David Mateos | 6 | 0 | 6 | 0 | 0 | 0 |
| 78 | DF | (France) FRA | Aurélien Collin | 28 | 2 | 27+1 | 2 | 0 | 0 |
Midfielders
| 5 | MF | (United States) USA | Servando Carrasco | 13 | 0 | 10+2 | 0 | 0+1 | 0 |
| 6 | MF | (United States) USA | Tony Cascio | 0 | 0 | 0 | 0 | 0 | 0 |
| 7 | MF | (Colombia) COL | Cristian Higuita | 28 | 1 | 25+1 | 1 | 2 | 0 |
| 8 | MF | (England) ENG | Harrison Heath | 5 | 0 | 2+1 | 0 | 1+1 | 0 |
| 10 | MF | (Brazil) BRA | Kaká | 30 | 10 | 28 | 9 | 2 | 1 |
| 12 | DF | (United States) USA | Eric Avila | 24 | 1 | 15+6 | 1 | 3 | 0 |
| 15 | MF | (Brazil) BRA | Pedro Ribeiro | 22 | 2 | 8+11 | 2 | 2+1 | 0 |
| 17 | MF | (El Salvador) SLV | Darwin Cerén | 28 | 2 | 25+1 | 2 | 2 | 0 |
| 23 | MF | (Trinidad and Tobago) TRI | Kevin Molino | 7 | 0 | 7 | 0 | 0 | 0 |
| 24 | MF | (England) ENG | Lewis Neal | 23 | 1 | 18+4 | 0 | 1 | 1 |
| 32 | MF | (Switzerland) SUI | Adrian Winter | 9 | 2 | 7+2 | 2 | 0 | 0 |
| 55 | MF | (Angola) ANG | Estrela | 0 | 0 | 0 | 0 | 0 | 0 |
Forwards
| 11 | FW | (Colombia) COL | Carlos Rivas | 29 | 4 | 13+14 | 0 | 2 | 4 |
| 19 | FW | (Democratic Republic of the Congo) COD | Danny Mwanga | 7 | 0 | 1+3 | 0 | 1+2 | 0 |
| 21 | FW | (Canada) CAN | Cyle Larin | 28 | 18 | 24+3 | 17 | 1 | 1 |
| 25 | FW | (United States) USA | Adam Bedell | 0 | 0 | 0 | 0 | 0 | 0 |
| 35 | FW | (Honduras) HON | Bryan Róchez | 17 | 3 | 0+17 | 3 | 0 | 0 |
Players away from the club on loan:
| 26 | FW | (Puerto Rico) PUR | Sidney Rivera | 0 | 0 | 0 | 0 | 0 | 0 |
| 42 | GK | (United States) USA | Josh Ford | 2 | 0 | 1+1 | 0 | 0 | 0 |
Players who appeared for the club but left during the season:
| 1 | GK | (Jamaica) JAM | Donovan Ricketts | 10 | 0 | 10 | 0 | 0 | 0 |
| 4 | DF | (Republic of Ireland) IRL | Sean St Ledger | 18 | 0 | 14+1 | 0 | 2+1 | 0 |
| 5 | MF | (United States) USA | Amobi Okugo | 17 | 0 | 9+6 | 0 | 1+1 | 0 |
| 9 | FW | (Northern Ireland) NIR | Martin Paterson | 4 | 0 | 0+4 | 0 | 0 | 0 |

=== Goalscorers ===
As of match played October 25, 2015

| Rank | No. | Pos. | Name | MLS | Open Cup | Total |
|---|---|---|---|---|---|---|
| 1 | 21 | FW | (Canada) Cyle Larin | 17 | 1 | 18 |
| 2 | 10 | MF | (Brazil) Kaká | 9 | 1 | 10 |
| 3 | 11 | FW | (Colombia) Carlos Rivas | 0 | 4 | 4 |
| 4 | 35 | FW | (Honduras) Bryan Róchez | 3 | 0 | 3 |
| 5 | 15 | MF | (Brazil) Pedro Ribeiro | 2 | 0 | 2 |
| 5 | 17 | MF | (El Salvador) Darwin Cerén | 2 | 0 | 2 |
| 5 | 32 | MF | (Switzerland) Adrian Winter | 2 | 0 | 2 |
| 5 | 78 | DF | (France) Aurélien Collin | 2 | 0 | 2 |
| 9 | 3 | DF | (England) Seb Hines | 1 | 0 | 1 |
| 9 | 7 | MF | (Colombia) Cristian Higuita | 1 | 0 | 1 |
| 9 | 12 | DF | (United States) Eric Avila | 1 | 0 | 1 |
| 9 | 14 | DF | (England) Luke Boden | 1 | 0 | 1 |
| 9 | 24 | MF | (England) Lewis Neal | 0 | 1 | 1 |
| Own goal | | | | 5 | 0 | 1 |
| Total | | | | 46 | 7 | 53 |

=== Shutouts ===
As of match played October 25, 2015

| Rank | No. | Name | MLS | Open Cup | Total |
|---|---|---|---|---|---|
| 1 | 22 | (United States) Tally Hall | 5 | 1 | 6 |
| 2 | 1 | (Jamaica) Donovan Ricketts | 2 | 0 | 2 |
| 3 | 36 | (United States) Earl Edwards Jr. | 0 | 1 | 1 |
| 3 | 42 | (United States) Josh Ford | 1 | 0 | 1 |
| Total | | | 8 | 2 | 10 |

=== Disciplinary record ===
As of match played October 25, 2015

| No. | Pos. | Name | MLS | | Open Cup | | Total | |
| No. | Pos. | Name | Booked | Sent off (straight red) | Booked | Sent off (straight red) | Booked | Sent off (straight red) |
|---|---|---|---|---|---|---|---|---|
| 2 | DF | (United States) Tyler Turner | 1 | 1 | 0 | 0 | 1 | 1 |
| 3 | DF | (England) Seb Hines | 2 | 0 | 0 | 0 | 2 | 0 |
| 4 | DF | (Republic of Ireland) Sean St Ledger | 1 | 0 | 0 | 0 | 1 | 0 |
| 5 | MF | (United States) Amobi Okugo | 5 | 0 | 0 | 0 | 5 | 0 |
| 5 | MF | (United States) Servando Carrasco | 3 | 0 | 0 | 0 | 3 | 0 |
| 7 | MF | (Colombia) Cristian Higuita | 10 | 1 | 2 | 0 | 12 | 1 |
| 8 | MF | (England) Harrison Heath | 0 | 0 | 1 | 0 | 1 | 0 |
| 9 | FW | (Northern Ireland) Martin Paterson | 1 | 0 | 0 | 0 | 1 | 0 |
| 10 | MF | (Brazil) Kaká | 5 | 1 | 0 | 0 | 5 | 1 |
| 11 | FW | (Colombia) Carlos Rivas | 6 | 0 | 0 | 0 | 6 | 0 |
| 14 | DF | (England) Luke Boden | 5 | 1 | 0 | 0 | 5 | 1 |
| 15 | MF | (United States) Eric Avila | 1 | 0 | 0 | 0 | 1 | 0 |
| 17 | MF | (El Salvador) Darwin Cerén | 6 | 0 | 0 | 0 | 6 | 0 |
| 20 | DF | (United States) Brek Shea | 7 | 1 | 0 | 0 | 7 | 1 |
| 21 | FW | (Canada) Cyle Larin | 0 | 1 | 1 | 0 | 1 | 1 |
| 22 | GK | (United States) Tally Hall | 2 | 0 | 0 | 0 | 2 | 0 |
| 23 | MF | (Trinidad and Tobago) Kevin Molino | 3 | 0 | 0 | 0 | 3 | 0 |
| 27 | DF | (Portugal) Rafael Ramos | 4 | 2 | 1 | 0 | 5 | 2 |
| 32 | MF | (Switzerland) Adrian Winter | 1 | 1 | 0 | 0 | 1 | 1 |
| 35 | FW | (Honduras) Bryan Róchez | 2 | 0 | 0 | 0 | 2 | 0 |
| 36 | GK | (United States) Earl Edwards Jr. | 0 | 0 | 1 | 0 | 1 | 0 |
| 78 | DF | (France) Aurélien Collin | 2 | 1 | 0 | 0 | 2 | 1 |
| Total | | | 67 | 10 | 6 | 0 | 73 | 10 |

== Player movement ==
Per Major League Soccer and club policies, terms of the deals do not get disclosed.

=== MLS SuperDraft picks ===
Draft picks are not automatically signed to the team roster. The 2015 draft was held on January 15, 2015. Orlando had five selections.

2015 Orlando City MLS SuperDraft Picks
| Round | Selection | Player | Position | College | Status |
|---|---|---|---|---|---|
| 1 | 1 | (Canada) Cyle Larin | FW | University of Connecticut | Signed |
| 2 | 22 | (United States) Conor Donovan | DF | North Carolina State University | Signed |
| 2 | 25 | (Jamaica) Akeil Barrett | FW | (Ohio) University of Akron | Released |
| 3 | 43 | (United States) Earl Edwards Jr. | GK | (California) UCLA | Signed |
| 4 | 63 | (Puerto Rico) Sidney Rivera | FW | (Virginia) Old Dominion University | Signed |

=== Transfers in ===
| Date | Name | Pos. | Transferred from | Fee/notes | Ref. |
|---|---|---|---|---|---|
| July 1, 2014 | (Brazil) Kaká | MF | (Italy) AC Milan | Free transfer, first designated player | |
| December 8, 2014 | (United States) Tally Hall | GK | (United States) Houston Dynamo | Acquired with Allocation Money, Orlando also received an international slot | |
| December 8, 2014 | (United States) Amobi Okugo | DF | (United States) Philadelphia Union | Acquired with $100,000 Allocation Money and a 2016 Superdraft pick | |
| December 8, 2014 | (France) Aurélien Collin | DF | (United States) Sporting Kansas City | Acquired via allocation money and 2014 MLS Expansion Draft pick Jalil Anibaba | |
| December 10, 2014 | (Jamaica) Donovan Ricketts | GK | (United States) Portland Timbers | Expansion Draft | |
| December 10, 2014 | (United States) Tony Cascio | MF | (United States) Colorado Rapids | Expansion Draft | |
| December 10, 2014 | (Democratic Republic of the Congo) Danny Mwanga | FW | (United States) Colorado Rapids | Expansion Draft | |
| December 10, 2014 | (Brazil) Pedro Ribeiro | MF | (United States) Philadelphia Union | Expansion Draft | |
| December 10, 2014 | (England) Lewis Neal | MF | (United States) D.C. United | Expansion Draft | |
| December 10, 2014 | (Costa Rica) Jairo Arrieta | FW | (United States) Columbus Crew | Expansion Draft | |
| December 15, 2014 | (Honduras) Bryan Róchez | FW | (Honduras) Real España | Undisclosed fee, designated player | |
| December 18, 2014 | (United States) Josh Ford | GK | (United States) Seattle Sounders FC | MLS re-entry draft | |
| December 19, 2014 | (United States) Brek Shea | MF | (England) Stoke City | Undisclosed fee | |
| January 5, 2015 | (Brazil) Gustavo | DF | (Brazil) Vila Nova | Free agent | |
| January 26, 2015 | (Colombia) Cristian Higuita | MF | (Colombia) Deportivo Cali | | |
| January 26, 2015 | (Colombia) Carlos Rivas | FW | (Colombia) Deportivo Cali | | |
| July 14, 2015 | (United States) Corey Ashe | LB | (United States) Houston Dynamo | Acquired with allocation money and a second-round selection in the 2017 MLS SuperDraft | |
| July 20, 2015 | (United States) Servando Carrasco | MF | (United States) Sporting Kansas City | Traded for Amobi Okugo | |
| July 29, 2015 | (Switzerland) Adrian Winter | MF | (Switzerland) FC Luzern | | |
| July 29, 2015 | (Spain) David Mateos | DF | (Hungary) Ferencvárosi TC | | |
| August 6, 2015 | (United States) Adam Bedell | FW | (United States) Columbus Crew SC | Acquired with a second round pick in the 2016 MLS SuperDraft | |

=== Loans in ===
| Pos. | Name | Loaned from | From | Until | Ref. |
|---|---|---|---|---|---|
| FW | (Northern Ireland) Martin Paterson | (England) Huddersfield Town | January 26, 2015 | August 5, 2015 | |
| DF | (England) Seb Hines | (England) Middlesbrough | February 24, 2015 | August 2015 | |

=== Transfers out ===
| Date | Name | Pos. | Transferred to | Fee/notes | Ref. |
|---|---|---|---|---|---|
| January 14, 2015 | (Costa Rica) Jairo Arrieta | FW | (United States) D.C. United | For international slot | |
| February 12, 2015 | (Brazil) Gustavo | DF | (India) Mohun Bagan A.C. | Released from club | |
| July 20, 2015 | (United States) Amobi Okugo | MF | (United States) Sporting Kansas City | Traded for Servando Carrasco | |
| July 30, 2015 | (Jamaica) Donovan Ricketts | GK | (United States) LA Galaxy | Traded for a second round pick in the 2016 MLS SuperDraft | |
| July 31, 2015 | (Republic of Ireland) Sean St Ledger | DF | (United States) Colorado Rapids | Placed on waivers. "Serious breach of club policy" cited as a reason. | |

=== Loans out ===
| No. | Pos. | Name | Loaned to | From | Until | Ref. |
|---|---|---|---|---|---|---|
| | MF | (Brazil) Kaká | (Brazil) São Paulo FC | July 1, 2014 | December 6, 2014 | |
| 26 | FW | (Puerto Rico) Sidney Rivera | (United States) Louisville City FC | May 8, 2015 | July 23, 2015 | |
| 42 | GK | (United States) Josh Ford | (United States) Fort Lauderdale Strikers | May 29, 2015 | — | |
| 23 | MF | (United States) Conor Donovan | (United States) Pittsburgh Riverhounds | July 25, 2015 | July 31, 2015 | |
| 26 | FW | (Puerto Rico) Sidney Rivera | (United States) Pittsburgh Riverhounds | July 30, 2015 | — | |
| 29 | CB | (United States) Tommy Redding | (United States) Wilmington Hammerheads FC | July 30, 2015 | August 7, 2015 | |

== Media ==
Any matches that are not featured in the MLS national television package on either ESPN2, Fox Sports 1 or UniMás will air locally on WOFL FOX 35 or WRBW My65. The commentary team will be Jeff Radcliffe on play-by-play and Kevin Hartman on color commentary, with Holly Bristow as sideline reporter. In addition, most matches not on the MLS national television package will be simulcast on Fox Sports Florida or Sun Sports to fans outside the Orlando market. Some matches will be placed on tape delay to accommodate Tampa Bay Rays and Florida Marlins baseball games.

On the radio, matches will air on WTKS-FM "Real Radio 104.1" in English, with Tom Traxler and Adam Schick providing the call. When City is on a nationally televised match, Jeff Radcliffe will call the match on WTKS with Tom Traxler. Matches will also air on WONQ "La Grande 1030" in Spanish. The Spanish play-by-play announcer is Sergio Ruiz Torres, with color commentary by Israel Heredia. The Spanish radio feed will be used as the SAP Spanish feed on Fox Sports Florida and Sun Sports.

Orlando City does not black out matches not on the MLS national television package on MLS Live, enabling local fans to watch matches live via live stream.

== See also ==
- 2015 in American soccer
- 2015 Major League Soccer season
