= Pedro Ribeiro =

Pedro Ribeiro may refer to:

- Pedro Ribeiro (director), Portuguese theatre and opera director and designer
- Pedro Ribeiro (footballer, born 1979), Portuguese football right-back
- Pedro Ribeiro (footballer, born 1983) Portuguese football centre-back
- Pedro Ribeiro (football manager) (born 1985), Portuguese football manager
- Pedro Ribeiro (Brazilian footballer) (born 1990), Brazilian football attacking midfielder
- Pedro Ribeiro Ferreira (born 1997), Portuguese trampoline gymnast
