= 2017 Orlando City SC season =

Orlando City SC
2017 season
- CEO: Alex Leitão
- Manager: Jason Kreis
- Stadium: Orlando City Stadium
- MLS: Conference: 10th Overall: 18th
- MLS Playoffs: Did not qualify
- U.S. Open Cup: Fourth round
- Top goalscorer: League: Cyle Larin; (12 goals); All: Cyle Larin; (12 goals)
- Highest home attendance: MLS: 25,527 (ten times)
- Lowest home attendance: MLS: 23,018 (September 27 vs. NE Revolution)
- Average home league attendance: 25,028
| Home colors | Away colors |

The 2017 Orlando City SC season was the club's seventh season of existence in Orlando, and third season in Major League Soccer, the top-flight league in the United States soccer league system. The team opened the season with a 1–0 win over New York City FC, at the newly completed Orlando City Stadium.

== Background ==
On December 29, 2016, club president Phil Rawlins announced his reduced role in the organization, acting as a liaison for the clubs and their brand in league matters (such as the MLS Expansion Committee), and consulting on the board of directors. The day-to-day operational duties were handed over to CEO Alex Leitão. In recognition for his nine years of service, owner Flavio Augusto da Silva announced that Phil's position would become permanent, bestowing the title of life-president. One of his first actions, on January 4, 2017, was to dedicate the 49 rainbow-colored seats in Section 12 of the new stadium to permanently honor the victims and families of those affected by the Pulse tragedy on June 12, 2016.

== Roster ==
Last updated on August 10, 2017

| No. | Nationality | Name | Position(s) | Date of birth (age) | Previous club | Notes |
Goalkeepers
| 1 | (United States) | Joe Bendik | GK | April 25, 1989 (aged 27) | (Canada) Toronto FC | – |
| 28 | (Puerto Rico) | Josh Saunders | GK | March 21, 1981 (aged 35) | (United States) New York City FC | – |
| 36 | (United States) | Earl Edwards Jr. | GK | January 24, 1992 (aged 25) | (United States) UCLA Bruins | – |
Defenders
| 2 | (United States) | Jonathan Spector | CB | March 1, 1986 (aged 31) | (England) Birmingham City | – |
| 3 | (England) | Seb Hines | CB | May 29, 1988 (aged 28) | (England) Middlesbrough | – |
| 4 | (Uruguay) | José Aja | CB | May 10, 1993 (aged 23) | (Uruguay) Nacional | INT |
| 12 | (United States) | Kevin Alston | LB | May 5, 1988 (aged 28) | (United States) New England Revolution | – |
| 21 | (Switzerland) | Scott Sutter | RB | May 13, 1986 (aged 30) | (Switzerland) BSC Young Boys | INT |
| 22 | (United States) | Conor Donovan | CB | January 8, 1996 (aged 21) | (United States) NC State Wolfpack | GA |
| 25 | (United States) | Donny Toia | LB | May 28, 1992 (aged 24) | (Canada) Montreal Impact | – |
| 27 | (Portugal) | Rafael Ramos | RB | January 9, 1995 (aged 22) | (Portugal) S.L. Benfica Juniors U-19 | – |
| 29 | (United States) | Tommy Redding | CB | January 24, 1997 (aged 20) | (United States) FC America | HGP |
| 94 | (Brazil) | PC | LB | March 10, 1994 (aged 22) | (United States) Fort Lauderdale Strikers | INT |
| 95 | (Brazil) | Léo Pereira | CB | January 31, 1996 (aged 21) | (Brazil) Athletico Paranaense | Loan in, INT |
Midfielders
| 5 | (United States) | Servando Carrasco | DM | August 13, 1988 (aged 28) | (United States) Sporting Kansas City | – |
| 6 | (Canada) | Richie Laryea | AM | January 7, 1995 (aged 22) | (Canada) Sigma FC | – |
| 7 | (Colombia) | Cristian Higuita | CM | January 14, 1994 (aged 23) | (Colombia) Deportivo Cali | – |
| 8 | (Canada) | Will Johnson (vice-captain) | CM | January 21, 1987 (aged 30) | (Canada) Toronto FC | – |
| 10 | (Brazil) | Kaká (captain) | AM | April 22, 1982 (aged 34) | (Italy) A.C. Milan | INT, DP |
| 15 | (United States) | Dillon Powers | DM | February 14, 1991 (aged 26) | (United States) Colorado Rapids | – |
| 16 | (Belize) | Tony Rocha | CM | August 21, 1993 (aged 23) | (United States) Orlando City B | – |
| 23 | (Italy) | Antonio Nocerino (vice-captain) | DM | April 9, 1985 (aged 31) | (Italy) A.C. Milan | INT |
Forwards
| 9 | (Canada) | Cyle Larin | CF | April 17, 1995 (aged 21) | (United States) Connecticut Huskies | GA |
| 11 | (Colombia) | Carlos Rivas | RW | April 15, 1994 (aged 22) | (Colombia) Deportivo Cali | INT, DP |
| 13 | (Guinea) | Hadji Barry | CF | December 8, 1992 (aged 24) | (United States) UCF Knights | – |
| 14 | (Jamaica) | Giles Barnes | CF | August 5, 1988 (aged 28) | (Canada) Vancouver Whitecaps FC | – |
| 18 | (United States) | Dom Dwyer | CF | July 30, 1990 (aged 26) | (United States) Sporting KC | – |
| 19 | (Peru) | Yoshimar Yotún | LW | April 7, 1990 (aged 26) | (Sweden) Malmö FF | INT, DP |
| 98 | (United States) | Pierre da Silva | LW | July 28, 1998 (aged 18) | (United States) Orlando City B | – |

== Staff ==
Executive
| Majority owner and chairman | (Brazil) Flávio Augusto da Silva |
| Minor owner and president | (England) Phil Rawlins |
| Owner | (England) John Bonner |
| Chief executive officer | (Brazil) Alex Leitão |
| General manager | (Canada) Niki Budalić |
Coaching staff
| Head coach | (United States) Jason Kreis |
| Assistant coach | (United States) C.J. Brown |
| Assistant coach | (United States) Miles Joseph |
| Assistant coach/Academy coordinator | (United States) Bobby Murphy |
| Goalkeeping coach | (United States) Tim Mulqueen |
| B team head coach | (Wales) Anthony Pulis |

== Competitions ==
=== Friendlies ===
The Lions finish the preseason 2–2–2. Their first official match at the new stadium is a 3–1 friendly win against USL side St. Louis FC.

| February 4 | **Jacksonville Dolphins** | **0–5** | **Orlando City** | Jacksonville, Florida |
| 12:00 pm EST | | | Spector 18'; Kaká 40'; Higuita 59'; Rivas 67'; Barry 76' | Stadium: Southern Oak Stadium; Attendance: Closed-door scrimmage |

| February 11 | **Orlando City** | **0–0** | **Tampa Bay Rowdies** | Sanford, Florida |
| 11:00 am EST | | | | Stadium: Sylvan Lake Park; Attendance: Closed-door scrimmage |

| February 15 | **Philadelphia Union** | **3–3** | **Orlando City** | Clearwater, Florida |
| 1:00 pm EST | Simpson; Ilsinho; Sapong | | Johnson; Rivas; Larin | Stadium: Joe DiMaggio Stadium; Attendance: Closed-door scrimmage |

| February 19 | **Orlando City** | **1–3** | **Toronto FC** | Davenport, Florida |
| 2:00 pm | Kaká 43' (pen.) | | Altidore 4'; Giovinco 84'; Morrow 85' | Stadium: Champions Gate |
Note: Game 1 of 2

| February 19 | **Orlando City** | **0–4** | **Toronto FC** | Davenport, Florida |
| 4:00 pm | Own goal | | Spencer; Andrews; James | Stadium: Champions Gate |
Note: Game 2 of 2

| February 25 | **Orlando City** | **3–1** | **St. Louis FC** | Orlando, Florida |
| 5:00 pm EST | Kaká 4'; Larin 25', 35' | | Petosevic 89' | Stadium: Orlando City Stadium; Attendance: Closed-door friendly |

| November 4 | **Orlando City** | **6–1** | **Puerto Rico** | Orlando, Florida |
| 7:30 pm EST | Dwyer 39'; Larin 59', 90+1'; Barry 69'; Hines 79'; Rocha 86' | Report | Cabán 19' | Stadium: Orlando City Stadium; Attendance: 8,231 |
Note: Fundraiser for Puerto Rico Relief in aftermath of Hurricane Maria; Kaka's final match for Orlando City

=== Major League Soccer ===
All times in regular season on Eastern Daylight Time (UTC−04:00) except where otherwise noted.

The MLS schedule was released on January 12. Orlando City played its first regular season match in their new stadium on March 5, against their expansion rivals NYCFC. New expansion teams for this year are Minnesota United FC, led by former coach Adrian Heath, and Atlanta United FC. The squad goes into the season riding a 2-game winning streak, besting the Union at Philadelphia, and D.C. United at Camping World Stadium last October.

The team announced two sellouts on February 21: the Home Opener vs. NYCFC on March 5, and the L.A. Galaxy on April 15.

Officials with the Atlanta Stadium group announced on April 18 that the retractable roof will not be completed in time for their planned opening match between Atlanta United FC and Orlando City SC on July 30, forcing moving the game to Bobby Dodd Stadium on July 29. The Lions visited Mercedes-Benz Stadium on September 16, playing to a 3–3 draw, in front 70,425 fans. The game set an MLS attendance record, and registered as 4th-largest crowd in the world this season.

==== Results summary ====
| Overall | | | | | | | | Home | | | | | | Away | | | | | |
| Pld | W | D | L | GF | GA | GD | Pts | W | D | L | GF | GA | GD | W | D | L | GF | GA | GD |
|---|---|---|---|---|---|---|---|---|---|---|---|---|---|---|---|---|---|---|---|
| 34 | 10 | 9 | 15 | 39 | 58 | −19 | 39 | 7 | 5 | 5 | 24 | 19 | +5 | 3 | 4 | 10 | 15 | 39 | −24 |

Source: Match reports

| Round | 1 | 2 | 3 | 4 | 5 | 6 | 7 | 8 | 9 | 10 | 11 | 12 | 13 | 14 | 15 | 16 | 17 | 18 | 19 | 20 | 21 | 22 | 23 | 24 | 25 | 26 | 27 | 28 | 29 | 30 | 31 | 32 | 33 | 34 |
|---|---|---|---|---|---|---|---|---|---|---|---|---|---|---|---|---|---|---|---|---|---|---|---|---|---|---|---|---|---|---|---|---|---|---|
| Ground | H | A | H | A | H | H | A | H | A | A | H | A | H | A | H | H | H | A | A | A | H | H | A | A | A | H | H | A | A | A | H | H | H | A |
| Result | W | L | W | L | W | W | W | W | L | L | D | D | L | L | W | D | D | D | L | W | L | L | D | L | L | D | L | W | D | L | W | D | L | L |

Source: Match reports
A = Away; H = Home; W = Win; D = Draw; L = Loss

==== Results ====
| March 5 1 | **Orlando City** | **1–0** | **New York City FC** | Orlando, Florida |
| 5:00 p.m. EST | Larin 15'; Johnson (yellow card) 61' | Report | Wallace (yellow card) 30'; Ring (yellow card) 67' | Stadium: Orlando City Stadium; Attendance: 25,527; Referee: Jair Marrufo |

| March 11 2 | **New England Revolution** | **P–P** | **Orlando City** | Foxborough, Massachusetts |
| 2:00 p.m. EST | | | | Stadium: Gillette Stadium |
Note: Match postponed due to weather; rescheduled for September 2

| March 18 3 | **Orlando City** | **2–1** | **Philadelphia Union** | Orlando, Florida |
| 7:30 p.m. | Rivas (yellow card) 25'; Larin 39', 73'; García (yellow card) 80'; Spector (yellow card) 82' | Report | Onyewu (yellow card) 28'; Sapong 52'; Medunjanin (yellow card) 80' | Stadium: Orlando City Stadium; Attendance: 25,527; Referee: Fotis Bazakos |

| April 1 4 | **Columbus Crew** | **2–0** | **Orlando City** | Columbus, Ohio |
| 4:00 p.m. | Meram 13', 77' (yellow card) 17' | Report | Carrasco (yellow card) 60'; Redding (yellow card) 76' | Stadium: MAPFRE Stadium; Attendance: 12,226; Referee: José Carlos Rivero |

| April 9 5 | **Orlando City** | **1–0** | **New York Red Bulls** | Orlando, Florida |
| 4:00 p.m. | Carrasco 34'; Higuita (yellow card) 61'; Gil (yellow card) 86'; Toia (yellow card) 90+4' | Report | Collin (yellow card) 76' | Stadium: Orlando City Stadium; Attendance: 25,527; Referee: Ismail Elfath |

| April 15 6 | **Orlando City** | **2–1** | **LA Galaxy** | Orlando, Florida |
| 3:00 p.m. | Johnson 9'; Larin 90+1' | Report | Van Damme (yellow card) 52'; Pedro (yellow card) 64'; Alessandrini 83' | Stadium: Orlando City Stadium; Attendance: 25,527; Referee: Chris Penso |

| April 23 7 | **New York City FC** | **1–2** | **Orlando City** | New York, New York |
| 1:30 p.m. | Moralez (yellow card) 2'; Pirlo (yellow card) 45'; Villa (yellow card) 54' (goal) 74'; White (yellow card) 59' | Report | Larin 31', 51' (yellow card) 90+3'; Higuita (yellow card) 57'; Redding (yellow card) 72'; Nocerino (yellow card) 82' | Stadium: Yankee Stadium; Attendance: 22,470; Referee: Jair Marrufo |

| April 29 8 | **Orlando City** | **2–0** | **Colorado Rapids** | Orlando, Florida |
| 4:00 p.m. | García (yellow card) 36'; Rivas 70'; Redding (yellow card) 74'; Kaká 90+1' | Report | Doyle (yellow card) 20'; Azira (yellow card) 35'; Burling (yellow card) 90+2' | Stadium: Orlando City Stadium; Attendance: 25,527; Referee: Robert Sibiga |

| May 3 9 | **Toronto FC** | **2–1** | **Orlando City** | Toronto, Canada |
| 7:30 pm EST | Giovinco 9', 38'; Bono (yellow card) 50'; Altidore (yellow card) 52'; Bradley (yellow card) 90+3' | Report | Kaká 45+1'; Spector (yellow card) 74'; Higuita (yellow card) 85' | Stadium: BMO Field; Attendance: 25,200; Referee: Baldomero Toledo |

| May 6 10 | **Houston Dynamo** | **4–0** | **Orlando City** | Houston, Texas |
| 8:30 p.m. | Elis 23'; Manotas 51', 65'; Quioto 75' (yellow card) 45+3'; DelLaGarza (yellow card) 60'; Machado (yellow card) 84' | Report | Toia (yellow card) 79' | Stadium: BBVA Compass Stadium; Attendance: 19,292; Referee: Sorin Stoica |

| May 13 11 | **Orlando City** | **2–2** | **Sporting Kansas City** | Orlando, Florida |
| 7:30 p.m. | Ajá (yellow card) 11'; Larin 16'; Kaká 26'; Higuita (yellow card) 40' | Report | Blessing 9', 74', (yellow card) 79'; Zusi (yellow card) 48'; Sanchez (yellow card) 79' | Stadium: Orlando City Stadium; Attendance: 25,527; Referee: Ricardo Salazar |

| May 17 12 | **San Jose Earthquakes** | **1–1** | **Orlando City** | San Jose, California |
| 10:30 p.m. | Godoy (yellow card) 44'; Ureña (yellow card) 62'; Lima (yellow card) 68'; Cerén (yellow card) 70'; Wondolowski 83' | Report | Pereira (yellow card) 25'; Rivas 80' | Stadium: Avaya Stadium; Attendance: 18,000; Referee: Drew Fischer |

| May 21 13 | **Orlando City** | **0–3** | **New York City FC** | Orlando, Florida |
| 7:00 p.m. | Rivas (yellow card) 34'; Pereira (yellow card) 90+2' | Report | Villa 14' (pen.), 82'; Lopez (yellow card) 19'; Wallace 35'; Moralez (yellow card) 45+1' | Stadium: Orlando City Stadium; Attendance: 25,527; Referee: Mark Geiger |

| May 27 14 | **Minnesota United FC** | **1–0** | **Orlando City** | Minneapolis, Minnesota |
| 8:00 p.m. | Venegas (yellow card) 38'; Ramirez 56'; Cronin (yellow card) 66'; Jome (yellow card) 76'; Burch (yellow card) 81'; Ibarra (yellow card) 90+1' | Report | | Stadium: TCF Bank Stadium; Attendance: 18,896; Referee: Nima Saghafi |

| May 31 15 | **Orlando City** | **2–0** | **D.C. United** | Orlando, Florida |
| 7:30 p.m. | Toia (yellow card) 35'; Bendik (yellow card) 65'; Larin 67'; Barnes 88' | Report | Kemp (yellow card) 34'; Sam (yellow card) 66' | Stadium: Orlando City Stadium; Attendance: 24,112; Referee: Allan Chapman |

| June 4 16 | **Orlando City** | **0–0** | **Chicago Fire** | Orlando, Florida |
| 7:30 p.m. | Ramos (red card) 26'; Nocerino (red card) 66' | Report | de Leeuw (yellow card) 60'; Arshakyan (yellow card) 81' | Stadium: Orlando City Stadium; Attendance: 24,469; Referee: Ted Unkel |
Note: Ramos' red card rescinded on June 7 with no fine; eligible to play in next match

| June 17 17 | **Orlando City** | **3–3** | **Montreal Impact** | Orlando, Florida |
| 7:30 p.m. | García 8', (yellow card) 89'; Rivas 23'; Aja (yellow card) 60'; Spector 90+4' | Report | Dzemaili 16', (yellow card) 45+2'; Ciman (yellow card) 18'; Piatti 58', 59'; Lovitz (yellow card) 52' | Stadium: Orlando City Stadium; Attendance: 25,527; Referee: Chris Penso |

| June 21 18 | **Seattle Sounders FC** | **1–1** | **Orlando City** | Seattle, Washington |
| 10:30 p.m. | Bruin 19'; Dempsey (yellow card) 75'; Torres (yellow card) 90+3' | Report | Johnson (yellow card) 78'; Spector (yellow card) 79'; Sutter 90+4' | Stadium: CenturyLink Field; Attendance: 42,333; Referee: Ismail Elfath |

| June 24 19 | **Chicago Fire** | **4–0** | **Orlando City** | Bridgeview, Illinois |
| 8:30 p.m. | Accam 3', 8', 63' (pen.); Nikolić 52', (yellow card) 69'; Schweinsteiger (yellow card) 53' de Leeuw (yellow card) 56' | Report | Johnson (yellow card) 22'; Higuita (yellow card) 33'; Kaká (yellow card) 58'; PC (yellow card) 84' | Stadium: Toyota Park; Attendance: 20,000; Referee: Jorge Gonzalez |

| June 30 20 | **Real Salt Lake** | **0–1** | **Orlando City** | Sandy, Utah |
| 9:30 p.m. | Sunday (yellow card) 65'; Beckerman (yellow card) 88' | Report | Johnson 17'; Kaká (yellow card) 68'; Ajá (yellow card) 71'; Higuita (yellow card) 87' | Stadium: Rio Tinto; Attendance: 19,218; Referee: Robert Sibiga |

| July 5 21 | **Orlando City** | **1–3** | **Toronto FC** | Orlando, Florida |
| 7:30 p.m. | Spector (yellow card) 23'; Ajá (yellow card) 45'; Rivas 63' | Report | Alseth (yellow card) 12'; Altidore 18'; Vázquez (yellow card) 45+4'; Giovinco 46', 65' | Stadium: Orlando City Stadium; Attendance: 25,029; Referee: Alan Kelly |

| July 21 22 | **Orlando City** | **0–1** | **Atlanta United FC** | Orlando, Florida |
| 7:00 p.m. | Kaká (yellow card) 6'; Johnson (yellow card) 60' | Report | Pírez (yellow card) 38'; Gressel (yellow card) 67'; Parkhurst (yellow card) 80'; Villalba 86' | Stadium: Orlando City Stadium; Attendance: 25,527; Referee: Jose Carlos Rivero |

| July 29 23 | **Atlanta United FC** | **1–1** | **Orlando City** | Atlanta, Georgia |
| 5:00 p.m. | Villalba (yellow card) 56', (goal) 90+2'; Asad (yellow card) 24' | Report | Kaká 40'; Higuita (yellow card) 56'; Johnson (yellow card) 86' | Stadium: Bobby Dodd Stadium; Attendance: 45,006; Referee: Allen Chapman |
Note: Rescheduled from July 30 at Mercedes-Benz Stadium due to construction delay

| August 5 24 | **Montreal Impact** | **2–1** | **Orlando City** | Montreal, Canada |
| 7:30 p.m. | Piatti 48' (pen.); Jackson-Hamel 84' | Report | Larin 12' | Stadium: Stade Saputo; Attendance: 20,801; Referee: Kevin Stott |

| August 12 25 | **New York Red Bulls** | **3–1** | **Orlando City** | Harrison, New Jersey |
| 7:30 p.m. | Pereira 30' (o.g.); Wright-Phillips 60'; Davis 80'; Perrinelle (yellow card) 45'; Felipe (yellow card) 67'; Davis (yellow card) 90+7'; Kljestan (yellow card) 90+2' | Report | Rivas 18', (yellow card) 39'; Laryea (yellow card) 90+2'; Higuita (yellow card) 90+7'; Kaká (red card) 90+7' | Stadium: Red Bull Arena; Attendance: 25,219; Referee: Jorge Gonzalez |

| August 19 26 | **Orlando City** | **1–1** | **Columbus Crew** | Orlando, Florida |
| 7:30 p.m. | Barnes 67'; Yotún (yellow card) 28' | Report | Abubakar (yellow card) 16', (goal) 35'; Martinez (yellow card) 55'; Afful (red card) 77'; Abu (yellow card) 81'; Meram (yellow card) 88' | Stadium: Orlando City Stadium; Attendance: 25,527; Referee: Juan Guzman, Jr. |

| August 26 27 | **Orlando City** | **1–2** | **Vancouver Whitecaps FC** | Orlando, Florida |
| 7:30 pm | Larin 62'; Toia (yellow card) 27'; Redding (yellow card) 71'; Kaká (yellow card) 75' | Report | Redding 9' (o.g.); Maund (yellow card) 25'; Shea 53' | Stadium: Orlando City Stadium; Attendance: 24,406; Referee: Hilario Grajeda |

| September 2 2 | **New England Revolution** | **4–0** | **Orlando City** | Foxborough, Massachusetts |
| 7:00 p.m. | Kamara 26', 75', 89'; Bunbury 90+2'; Agudelo (yellow card) 68' | Report | Pereira (yellow card) 55'; Aja (yellow card) 66' (yellow-red card) 80'; Rocha (yellow card) 86' | Stadium: Gillette Stadium; Attendance: 17,865; Referee: Robert Sibiga |
Note: Rescheduled from March 11 due to weather

| September 9 28 | **D.C. United** | **1–2** | **Orlando City** | Washington, D.C. |
| 7:00 p.m. | Acosta (yellow card) 24'; Arriola (yellow card) 34'; Franklin (yellow card) 78'; Opare 89'; Sam (yellow card) 90+6' | Report | Larin 19'; Barnes 28'; Sutter (yellow card) 32'; Carrasco (yellow card) 76' (yellow-red card) 79'; Hines (red card) 90+5'; Kaká (yellow card) 90+9' | Stadium: RFK Stadium; Attendance: 18,028; Referee: Dave Gantar |

| September 16 29 | **Atlanta United FC** | **3–3** | **Orlando City** | Atlanta, Georgia |
| 4:00 p.m. | Martinez 36', 55', 69' | Report | Dwyer 10', 39'; Larin 58' | Stadium: Mercedes-Benz Stadium; Attendance: 70,425 (MLS Record); Referee: Jair Marrufo |

| September 24 30 | **Portland Timbers** | **3–0** | **Orlando City** | Portland, Oregon |
| 8:00 p.m. | Valeri 15' (pen.), 59'; Mattocks 29'; Ridgewell (yellow card) 80' | Report | Spector (yellow card) 14' (yellow-red card); Nocerino (yellow card) 52'; PC (red card) 84' | Stadium: Providence Park; Attendance: 21,144; Referee: Baldomero Toledo |

| September 27 31 | **Orlando City** | **6–1** | **New England Revolution** | Orlando, Florida |
| 7:30 p.m. | Nocerino 22'; Hines 32'; Kaká 43', 77'; Kaká (yellow card) 28'; Pereira (yellow card) 33'; Hines (yellow card) 45'; Dwyer 84'; Yotún 90' | Report | Kouassi (red card) 11'; Dielna (yellow card) 21'; Caldwell (yellow card) 29'; Nguyen 45+1', (yellow card) 90+4' | Stadium: Orlando City Stadium; Attendance: 23,018; Referee: Silviu Petrescu |

| September 30 32 | **Orlando City** | **0–0** | **FC Dallas** | Orlando, Florida |
| 4:00 p.m. | | Report | Barrios (yellow card) 90+2'; Gonzalez (yellow card) 90+8' | Stadium: Orlando City Stadium; Attendance: 24,007; Referee: Armando Villarreal |
Note: Barrios subbed in during extra time, was incorrectly listed on roster; draw was not changed to a 3–0 forfeit, which would have kept OCSC in the playoff race.

| October 15 33 | **Orlando City** | **0–1** | **Columbus Crew** | Orlando, Florida |
| 3:00 p.m. | | | Kamara 66' | Stadium: Orlando City Stadium; Attendance: 25,166; Referee: Chris Penso |

| October 22 34 | **Philadelphia Union** | **6–1** | **Orlando City** | Chester, Pennsylvania |
| 4:00 p.m. | Ilsinho 3', 63'; Picault 6', 38'; Sapong 26', 74', (yellow card) 65' | Report | Dwyer 72' | Stadium: Talen Energy Stadium; Attendance: 18,595; Referee: Joseph Dickerson |

==== Standings ====
Eastern Conference table

| Pos | Team | Pld | W | L | T | GF | GA | GD | Pts |
|---|---|---|---|---|---|---|---|---|---|
| 7 | New England Revolution | 34 | 13 | 15 | 6 | 53 | 61 | −8 | **45** |
| 8 | Philadelphia Union | 34 | 11 | 14 | 9 | 50 | 47 | +3 | **42** |
| 9 | Montreal Impact | 34 | 11 | 17 | 6 | 52 | 58 | −6 | **39** |
| **10** | Orlando City SC | **34** | **10** | **15** | **9** | **39** | **58** | **−19** | **39** |
| 11 | D.C. United | 34 | 9 | 20 | 5 | 31 | 60 | −29 | **32** |

Source: MLS

Overall table

| Pos | Team | Pld | W | L | T | GF | GA | GD | Pts |
|---|---|---|---|---|---|---|---|---|---|
| 16 | Philadelphia Union | 34 | 11 | 14 | 9 | 50 | 47 | +3 | **42** |
| 17 | Montreal Impact | 34 | 11 | 17 | 6 | 52 | 58 | −6 | **39** |
| **18** | Orlando City SC | **34** | **10** | **15** | **9** | **39** | **58** | **−19** | **39** |
| 19 | Minnesota United FC | 34 | 10 | 18 | 6 | 47 | 70 | −23 | **36** |
| 20 | Colorado Rapids | 34 | 9 | 19 | 6 | 31 | 51 | −20 | **33** |

Source: MLS
Rules for classification: 1) points; 2) total wins; 3) total goal differential; 4) total goals scored; 5) disciplinary points; 6) away goals scored; 7) away goal differential; 8) coin toss or drawing of lots

=== U.S. Open Cup ===
Orlando City entered the tournament in the fourth round against Miami FC, who had beaten the Tampa Bay Rowdies 2–0 on May 31, 2017.

Bracket

Fourth Round; June 13–14
NASL | North Carolina FC | 2
**MLS** | **Houston Dynamo** | **3***
**MLS** | **Sporting Kansas City** | **4**
MLS | Minnesota United FC | 0
**MLS** | **FC Dallas** | **2**
USL | Tulsa Roughnecks FC | 1
**MLS** | **Colorado Rapids** | **3**
USL | Oklahoma City Energy FC | 2
**MLS** | **San Jose Earthquakes** | **2**
NASL | San Francisco Deltas | 0
**MLS** | **Seattle Sounders FC** | **2**
MLS | Portland Timbers | 1
**MLS** | **LA Galaxy** | **3**
USL | Orange County SC | 1
**USL** | **Sacramento Republic FC** | **4**
MLS | Real Salt Lake | 1
MLS | Orlando City SC | 1
**NASL** | **Miami FC** | **3**
**MLS** | **Atlanta United FC** | **3**
USL | Charleston Battery | 2
**USL** | **FC Cincinnati** | **1**
MLS | Columbus Crew SC | 0
USL | Saint Louis FC | 0
**MLS** | **Chicago Fire** | **1**
**MLS** | **New England Revolution** | **3**
USL | Rochester Rhinos | 0
**MLS** | **D.C. United** | **4**
LQ | Christos FC | 1
**MLS** | **New York Red Bulls** | **1**
MLS | New York City FC | 0
**MLS** | **Philadelphia Union** | **3**
USL | Harrisburg City Islanders | 1

Round of 16; June 27–28
MLS | Houston Dynamo | 0
**MLS** | **Sporting Kansas City** | **2**
**MLS** | **FC Dallas** | **3**
MLS | Colorado Rapids | 1
**MLS** | **San Jose Earthquakes** | **2**
MLS | Seattle Sounders FC | 1
**MLS** | **LA Galaxy** | **2**
USL | Sacramento Republic FC | 0
**NASL** | **Miami FC** | **3**
MLS | Atlanta United FC | 2
**USL** | **FC Cincinnati** | **0(3)**
MLS | Chicago Fire | 0(1)
**MLS** | **New England Revolution** | **2**
MLS | D.C. United | 1
**MLS** | **New York Red Bulls** | **1(5)**
MLS | Philadelphia Union | 1(3)

Quarterfinals; July 7–August 2
**MLS** | **Sporting Kansas City** | **3***
MLS | FC Dallas | 0
**MLS** | **San Jose Earthquakes** | **3**
MLS | LA Galaxy | 2
NASL | Miami FC | 0
**USL** | **FC Cincinnati** | **1**
MLS | New England Revolution | 0
**MLS** | **New York Red Bulls** | **1**

Semifinals; August 9–15
**MLS** | **Sporting Kansas City** | **1(5)**
MLS | San Jose Earthquakes | 1(4)
USL | FC Cincinnati | 2
**MLS** | **New York Red Bulls** | **3***

Final; September 20
**MLS** | **Sporting Kansas City** | **2**
MLS | New York Red Bulls | 1

- Host team listed first
- **Bold** = winner
- * = after extra time, ( ) = penalty shootout score
1. ^{A} The hosting priority for the final, in order, is Sporting KC then New York Red Bulls then FC Cincinnati

| June 14 Fourth round | **Orlando City (Florida)** | **1–3** | **(Florida) Miami FC** | Orlando, Florida |
| 7:00 pm | Barnes 79'; Pereira (yellow card) 52'; PC (yellow card) 84'; Ramos (yellow card) 90+4' | Report | Pinho 30', 36', 55'; Trafford (yellow card) 52'; Rennella (yellow card) 84' | Stadium: Orlando City Stadium; Attendance: 5,838; Referee: Rubiel Vazquez |

== Player statistics ==
=== Appearances ===
As of match played October 22, 2017

Starting appearances are listed first, followed by substitute appearances after the + symbol where applicable.

| No. | Pos | Nat | Player | Total | | MLS | | Open Cup | |
| No. | Pos | Nat | Player | Apps | Goals | Apps | Goals | Apps | Goals |
Goalkeepers
| 1 | GK | (United States) USA | Joe Bendik | 33 | 0 | 33 | 0 | 0 | 0 |
| 28 | GK | (Puerto Rico) PUR | Josh Saunders | 1 | 0 | 0 | 0 | 1 | 0 |
| 36 | GK | (United States) USA | Earl Edwards Jr. | 1 | 0 | 1 | 0 | 0 | 0 |
| 70 | GK | (United States) USA | Jake Fenlason | 0 | 0 | 0 | 0 | 0 | 0 |
Defenders
| 2 | DF | (United States) USA | Jonathan Spector | 26 | 1 | 25 | 1 | 1 | 0 |
| 3 | DF | (England) ENG | Seb Hines | 6 | 1 | 5+1 | 1 | 0 | 0 |
| 4 | DF | (Uruguay) URU | José Aja | 15 | 0 | 15 | 0 | 0 | 0 |
| 12 | DF | (United States) USA | Kevin Alston | 0 | 0 | 0 | 0 | 0 | 0 |
| 22 | DF | (United States) USA | Conor Donovan | 0 | 0 | 0 | 0 | 0 | 0 |
| 27 | DF | (Portugal) POR | Rafael Ramos | 3 | 0 | 1+1 | 0 | 1 | 0 |
| 29 | DF | (United States) USA | Tommy Redding | 19 | 0 | 14+4 | 0 | 0+1 | 0 |
| 21 | DF | (Switzerland) SUI | Scott Sutter | 32 | 1 | 30+2 | 1 | 0 | 0 |
| 25 | DF | (United States) USA | Donny Toia | 30 | 0 | 29+1 | 0 | 0 | 0 |
| 94 | DF | (Brazil) BRA | PC | 9 | 0 | 5+3 | 0 | 1 | 0 |
| 95 | DF | (Brazil) BRA | Léo Pereira | 11 | 0 | 9+1 | 0 | 1 | 0 |
Midfielders
| 5 | MF | (United States) USA | Servando Carrasco | 16 | 1 | 9+6 | 1 | 1 | 0 |
| 6 | MF | (Canada) CAN | Richie Laryea | 12 | 0 | 1+11 | 0 | 0 | 0 |
| 7 | MF | (Colombia) COL | Cristian Higuita | 26 | 0 | 18+8 | 0 | 0 | 0 |
| 8 | MF | (Canada) CAN | Will Johnson | 26 | 2 | 23+3 | 2 | 0 | 0 |
| 10 | MF | (Brazil) BRA | Kaká | 24 | 6 | 18+5 | 6 | 0+1 | 0 |
| 15 | MF | (United States) USA | Dillon Powers | 6 | 0 | 4+2 | 0 | 0 | 0 |
| 16 | MF | (Belize) BLZ | Tony Rocha | 3 | 0 | 0+3 | 0 | 0 | 0 |
| 23 | MF | (Italy) ITA | Antonio Nocerino | 32 | 1 | 28+3 | 1 | 1 | 0 |
Forwards
| 9 | FW | (Canada) CAN | Cyle Larin | 28 | 12 | 24+4 | 12 | 0 | 0 |
| 11 | FW | (Colombia) COL | Carlos Rivas | 31 | 5 | 21+9 | 5 | 0+1 | 0 |
| 13 | FW | (Guinea) GUI | Hadji Barry | 4 | 0 | 0+3 | 0 | 1 | 0 |
| 14 | FW | (Jamaica) JAM | Giles Barnes | 35 | 4 | 23+11 | 3 | 1 | 1 |
| 18 | FW | (United States) USA | Dom Dwyer | 12 | 4 | 11+1 | 4 | 0 | 0 |
| 19 | FW | (Peru) PER | Yoshimar Yotún | 10 | 1 | 10 | 1 | 0 | 0 |
| 98 | FW | (United States) USA | Pierre da Silva | 2 | 0 | 0+1 | 0 | 1 | 0 |
Players who appeared for the club but left during the season:
| 17 | MF | (United States) USA | Luis Gil | 18 | 0 | 6+11 | 0 | 1 | 0 |
| 32 | MF | (Argentina) ARG | Matías Pérez García | 15 | 1 | 11+4 | 1 | 0 | 0 |

=== Goalscorers ===
As of match played October 22, 2017

| Rank | No. | Pos. | Name | MLS | Open Cup | Total |
|---|---|---|---|---|---|---|
| 1 | 9 | FW | (Canada) Cyle Larin | 12 | 0 | 12 |
| 2 | 10 | MF | (Brazil) Kaká | 6 | 0 | 6 |
| 3 | 11 | FW | (Colombia) Carlos Rivas | 5 | 0 | 7 |
| 4 | 18 | FW | (United States) Dom Dwyer | 4 | 0 | 4 |
| 4 | 14 | FW | (Jamaica) Giles Barnes | 3 | 1 | 4 |
| 6 | 8 | MF | (Canada) Will Johnson | 2 | 0 | 2 |
| 7 | 2 | DF | (United States) Jonathan Spector | 1 | 0 | 1 |
| 7 | 3 | DF | (United States) Seb Hines | 1 | 0 | 1 |
| 7 | 5 | MF | (United States) Servando Carrasco | 1 | 0 | 1 |
| 7 | 19 | FW | (Peru) Yoshimar Yotún | 1 | 0 | 1 |
| 7 | 21 | DF | (Switzerland) Scott Sutter | 1 | 0 | 1 |
| 7 | 23 | MF | (Italy) Antonio Nocerino | 1 | 0 | 1 |
| 7 | 32 | MF | (Argentina) Matías Pérez García | 1 | 0 | 1 |
| Total | | | | 39 | 1 | 40 |

=== Shutouts ===
As of match played October 22, 2017

| Rank | No. | Name | MLS | Open Cup | Total |
|---|---|---|---|---|---|
| 1 | 1 | (United States) Joe Bendik | 7 | 0 | 7 |
| Total | | | 7 | 0 | 7 |

=== Disciplinary record ===
As of match played October 22, 2017

| No. | Pos. | Name | MLS | | | Open Cup | | | Total | | |
| No. | Pos. | Name | Booked | (yellow card) (yellow-red card) | Sent off (straight red) | Booked | (yellow card) (yellow-red card) | Sent off (straight red) | Booked | (yellow card) (yellow-red card) | Sent off (straight red) |
|---|---|---|---|---|---|---|---|---|---|---|---|
| 1 | GK | (United States) Joe Bendik | 1 | 0 | 0 | 0 | 0 | 0 | 1 | 0 | 0 |
| 2 | DF | (United States) Jonathan Spector | 4 | 1 | 0 | 0 | 0 | 0 | 4 | 1 | 0 |
| 3 | DF | (England) Seb Hines | 1 | 0 | 1 | 0 | 0 | 0 | 1 | 0 | 1 |
| 4 | DF | (Uruguay) José Aja | 4 | 1 | 0 | 0 | 0 | 0 | 4 | 1 | 0 |
| 5 | MF | (United States) Servando Carrasco | 1 | 1 | 0 | 0 | 0 | 0 | 1 | 1 | 0 |
| 6 | MF | (Canada) Richie Laryea | 2 | 0 | 0 | 0 | 0 | 0 | 2 | 0 | 0 |
| 7 | MF | (Colombia) Cristian Higuita | 9 | 0 | 0 | 0 | 0 | 0 | 9 | 0 | 0 |
| 8 | MF | (Canada) Will Johnson | 6 | 0 | 0 | 0 | 0 | 0 | 6 | 0 | 0 |
| 9 | FW | (Canada) Cyle Larin | 1 | 0 | 0 | 0 | 0 | 0 | 1 | 0 | 0 |
| 10 | MF | (Brazil) Kaká | 6 | 0 | 1 | 0 | 0 | 0 | 6 | 0 | 1 |
| 11 | FW | (Colombia) Carlos Rivas | 3 | 0 | 0 | 0 | 0 | 0 | 3 | 0 | 0 |
| 16 | MF | (Belize) Tony Rocha | 1 | 0 | 0 | 0 | 0 | 0 | 1 | 0 | 0 |
| 17 | MF | (United States) Luis Gil | 1 | 0 | 0 | 0 | 0 | 0 | 1 | 0 | 0 |
| 19 | FW | (Peru) Yoshimar Yotún | 2 | 0 | 0 | 0 | 0 | 0 | 2 | 0 | 0 |
| 21 | DF | (Switzerland) Scott Sutter | 1 | 0 | 0 | 0 | 0 | 0 | 1 | 0 | 0 |
| 23 | MF | (Italy) Antonio Nocerino | 2 | 0 | 1 | 0 | 0 | 0 | 2 | 0 | 1 |
| 25 | DF | (United States) Donny Toia | 4 | 0 | 0 | 0 | 0 | 0 | 4 | 0 | 0 |
| 27 | DF | (Portugal) Rafael Ramos | 0 | 0 | 1 | 1 | 0 | 0 | 1 | 0 | 1 |
| 29 | DF | (United States) Tommy Redding | 3 | 0 | 0 | 0 | 0 | 0 | 3 | 0 | 0 |
| 32 | MF | (Argentina) Matías Pérez García | 3 | 0 | 0 | 0 | 0 | 0 | 3 | 0 | 0 |
| 94 | DF | (Brazil) PC | 1 | 0 | 1 | 1 | 0 | 0 | 2 | 0 | 1 |
| 95 | DF | (Brazil) Léo Pereira | 4 | 0 | 0 | 1 | 0 | 0 | 5 | 0 | 0 |
| Total | | | 60 | 3 | 5 | 3 | 0 | 0 | 63 | 3 | 5 |

== Player movement ==
Per Major League Soccer and club policies, terms of the deals do not get disclosed.

=== MLS SuperDraft picks ===
Draft picks are not automatically signed to the team roster. The 2017 draft was held on January 13, 2017. Orlando had one selection.

2017 Orlando City MLS SuperDraft Picks
| Round | Selection | Player | Position | College | Status |
|---|---|---|---|---|---|
| 3 | 64 | (England) Danny Deakin | CF | University of South Carolina | Signed |

=== Transfers in ===
| No. | Name | Pos. | Transferred from | Fee/notes | Date | Ref. |
|---|---|---|---|---|---|---|
| 25 | (United States) Donny Toia | LB | (Canada) Montreal Impact | Traded for 1st Round Pick in 2017 MLS SuperDraft | December 23, 2016 | |
| | (United States) Patrick McLain | GK | (United States) Chicago Fire | Acquired in MLS Re-Entry Draft | December 16, 2016 | |
| 8 | (Canada) Will Johnson | CM | (Canada) Toronto FC | Free agent acquisition | December 28, 2016 | |
| 94 | (Brazil) PC | LB | (United States) Fort Lauderdale Strikers | Free agent acquisition | January 4, 2017 | |
| 98 | (United States) Pierre da Silva | LW | (United States) Orlando City B | Promoted to First Team from Orlando City B | January 21, 2017 | |
| 2 | (United States) Jonathan Spector | CB | (England) Birmingham City | Undisclosed | January 24, 2017 | |
| 28 | (Puerto Rico) Josh Saunders | GK | (United States) New York City FC | Traded for 4th-round selection in 2019 MLS SuperDraft | January 27, 2017 | |
| 14 | (Jamaica) Giles Barnes | CF | (Canada) Vancouver Whitecaps FC | Player Exchange | February 25, 2017 | |
| 21 | (Switzerland) Scott Sutter | RB | (Switzerland) BSC Young Boys | International Roster Slot acquisition | March 3, 2017 | |
| 30 | (England) Danny Deakin | CF | None | Signed with Orlando City B | April 19, 2017 | |
| 95 | (Brazil) Léo Pereira | CB | (United States) Orlando City B | Occupying International Roster Slot Vacated by Matias Perez Garcia; Recalled to First Team | June 28, 2017 | |
| 18 | (United States) Dom Dwyer | CF | (United States) Sporting KC | Exchange for General, Targeted, and Future Allocation Money | July 25, 2017 | |
| 19 | (Peru) Yoshimar Yotún | LW | (Sweden) Malmö FF | International Roster Slot acquisition; Targeted Allocation Money; Removed DP tag from Giles Barnes | August 5, 2017 | |
| 15 | (United States) Dillon Powers | DM | (United States) Colorado Rapids | Player Exchange for Luis Gil and Targeted Allocation Money | August 10, 2017 | |

=== Loans in ===
| No. | Name | Pos. | Loaned from | Notes | Date | Ref. |
|---|---|---|---|---|---|---|
| March 3, 2017 | (Senegal) Moussa Sane | ST | (Senegal) AS Dakar Sacre Soeur | Assignment to Orlando City B; Loan expired | | |
| April 6, 2017 | (United States) Luis Gil | AM | (Mexico) Querétaro FC | On Loan | | |
| April 14, 2017 | (Brazil) Léo Pereira | CB | (Brazil) Clube Atlético Paranaense | Season-long Loan | | |

=== Transfers out ===
| No. | Name | Pos. | Transferred to | Fee/notes | Date | Ref. |
|---|---|---|---|---|---|---|
| 14 | (England) Luke Boden | LB | (United States) Tampa Bay Rowdies | Option declined | November 23, 2016 | |
| 2 | (United States) Tyler Turner | RB | (United States) LA Galaxy II | Option declined | November 23, 2016 | |
| 15 | (Brazil) Pedro Ribeiro | CM | (United States) Harrisburg City Islanders | Option declined | November 23, 2016 | |
| 19 | (Brazil) Júlio Baptista | CF | (Romania) CFR Cluj | Option declined | November 23, 2016 | |
| 8 | (England) Harrison Heath | CM | (United States) Atlanta United FC | Traded for 4th-round selection in 2019 MLS SuperDraft | December 16, 2016 | |
| 45 | (United States) Mikey Ambrose | LB | (United States) Atlanta United FC | Selected No. 7 overall in 2016 Expansion Draft | December 13, 2016 | |
| 18 | (Trinidad and Tobago) Kevin Molino | RW | (United States) Minnesota United FC | Exchange for General Allocation Money | January 26, 2017 | |
| | (United States) Patrick McLain | GK | (United States) Minnesota United FC | Exchange for Targeted Allocation Money | January 26, 2017 | |
| 20 | (United States) Brek Shea | LW | (Canada) Vancouver Whitecaps FC | Player Exchange | February 25, 2017 | |
| 30 | (England) Danny Deakin | CF | (United States) Orlando City B | Waived off of Roster; option to sign with OCB | April 14, 2017 | |
| 32 | (Argentina) Matías Pérez García | AM | (Argentina) Tigre | Waived off of Roster; International Roster Slot Open | June 28, 2017 | |
| 17 | (United States) Luis Gil | AM | (United States) Colorado Rapids | Player Exchange with Targeted Allocation Money | August 10, 2017 | |

=== Loans out ===
Because of the inclusion of Orlando City B to the new stadium for home games, player movement between the two squads became possible for both teams. Some members who had MLS contracts had the "Right of Recall" option, applicable at any time to the first-team roster.

| No. | Name | Pos. | Loaned to | Notes | Date | Ref. |
|---|---|---|---|---|---|---|
| March 10, 2017 | (Honduras) Devron García | DM | (Honduras) Real C.D. España | Season Long Loan, expired 11/8/17 | | |
| March 24, 2017 | (United States) Earl Edwards Jr. | GK | (United States) Orlando City B | | | |
| March 24, 2017 | (Canada) Richie Laryea | AM | (United States) Orlando City B | | | |
| March 24, 2017 | (United States) Conor Donovan | CB | (United States) Orlando City B | Expired 11/8/17 | | |
| March 24, 2017 | (United States) Kevin Alston | RB | (United States) Orlando City B | Expired 11/8/17 | | |
| March 24, 2017 | (United States) Pierre da Silva | LW | (United States) Orlando City B | | | |
| March 24, 2017 | (United States) Tommy Redding | CB | (United States) Orlando City B | | | |
| March 24, 2017 | (Brazil) PC | LB | (United States) Orlando City B | | | |
| March 24, 2017 | (Guinea) Hadji Barry | CF | (United States) Orlando City B | Expired 11/8/17 | | |
| April 7, 2017 | (Senegal) Moussa Sane | ST | (United States) Orlando City B | Transfer Process Completed | | |
| April 26, 2017 | (Portugal) Rafael Ramos | RB | (United States) Orlando City B | | | |
| April 26, 2017 | (Puerto Rico) Josh Saunders | GK | (United States) Orlando City B | Expired 11/8/17 | | |
| April 26, 2017 | (England) Seb Hines | CB | (United States) Orlando City B | Expired 11/8/17 | | |

== Notable events ==
Orlando Health was the jersey sponsor for the seventh consecutive season. New primary home kits were unveiled at the Fan Forum on Friday, February 17.

On April 22, it was announced that Orlando City, alongside 3 other MLS clubs, would wear a special kit in commemoration of the Earth Day. The kit, made entirely with recycled plastic from the Maldives at the Indian Ocean, was made by Adidas in conjunction with the Parley for the Oceans foundation, in order to address marine plastic pollution in the world. Orlando used this kit in an away game against New York City FC on April 23.

On May 8, the USSF announced that Orlando City Stadium would join other MLS clubs in hosting FIFA World Cup Qualifiers for the 2018 tournament. The venue hosted the October 8 home match between the United States against Panama. It was the first national team fixture in Orlando since a friendly against Sweden in 1998.

The fourth round draw of the 2017 Lamar Hunt U.S. Open Cup, announced on May 18, had the Lions hosting the winner of Miami FC and the Tampa Bay Rowdies at Orlando City Stadium the second week of June (see above).

Starting Goalkeeper Joe Bendik posted back-to-back years of 100+ saves before the team's largest win of the season, a 6–1 victory over the New England Revolution on September 27 at Orlando City Stadium.

With the New York Red Bulls win on October 7, the Lions were mathematically eliminated from the playoffs for the 3rd straight year.

Captain and first Designated Player Kaká declined a one-year extension on his contract in October 2017. He played his final match, assisting on Dom Dwyer's goal, and was subbed off in the 65th minute of a friendly fundraiser against the Puerto Rico national team on November 4.

On November 7, Orlando City Stadium was among 5 venues announced to host matches for the 2018 Florida Cup. It hosted the tournament's opening games on January 10–11, 2018.
