= Susana Gaspar =

Susana Gaspar may refer to:

- Susana Gaspar (politician) (born 1974), Spanish politician
- Susana Gaspar (singer) (born 1981), Portuguese operatic soprano
