= Tommy Redding =

American soccer player (born 1997)

Personal information
- Full name: Thomas Redding
- Date of birth: January 24, 1997 (age 29)
- Place of birth: San Diego, California, United States
- Height: 6 ft 2 in (1.88 m)
- Position: Center back

Youth career
- 2012–2013: IMG Soccer Academy
- 2013–2014: Chicago Magic PSG

Senior career*
| Years | Team | Apps | (Gls) |
| 2014 | Orlando City | 16 | (0) |
| 2015–2017 | Orlando City | 38 | (0) |
| 2015 | → Wilmington Hammerheads (loan) | 1 | (0) |
| 2016–2017 | → Orlando City B | 3 | (0) |
| 2018 | New York Red Bulls | 1 | (0) |
| 2018 | → New York Red Bulls II | 2 | (0) |

International career^{‡}
| 2012–2013 | United States U17 | 12 | (0) |
| 2014–2015 | United States U18 | 4 | (0) |
| 2014–2017 | United States U20 | 14 | (0) |
Medal record
Representing United States
| Winner | CONCACAF U-20 Championship | 2017 |
- * Club domestic league appearances and goals as of July 13, 2018 ‡ National team caps and goals as of June 4, 2017

Thomas Redding (born January 24, 1997) is an American former professional soccer player who played as a defender.

== Club career ==
=== Orlando City ===
Born in San Diego, California and growing up in Oviedo, Florida, Redding began his youth career with IMG Soccer Academy and Chicago Magic PSG in the U.S. Soccer Development Academy. His play at the youth level attracted the interest of Orlando City and on March 11, 2014, Redding signed both a USL Pro contract and an MLS contract with Orlando City becoming the club's first ever homegrown player.

On May 14, 2014, Redding made his professional debut with Orlando City in the United Soccer League, starting in a 1–0 victory over Arizona United. He ended the season appearing in 18 matches for the club.

On July 30, 2015, Redding was loaned to Wilmington Hammerheads FC. He only appeared in one match for Wilmington during his brief loan spell. Upon returning, he made his Major League Soccer debut for Orlando City in a 0–0 draw on August 8, 2015, against the Philadelphia Union. On October 3, 2015, Redding was diagnosed with a concussion after colliding with teammate Rafael Ramos during a match against the Montreal Impact.

On July 4, 2016, Redding suffered a hamstring injury. After missing five matches due to the injury, Redding was loaned to Orlando City B on August 5, 2016.

Redding dealt with plantar fasciitis during the 2017 season.

=== New York Red Bulls ===
On January 3, 2018, Redding was traded to New York Red Bulls, along with teammate Carlos Rivas, in exchange for Sacha Kljestan and $150,000 of Target Allocation Money. Redding was loaned to affiliate side New York Red Bulls II during March 2018. On March 17, 2018, he made his first appearance for Red Bulls II, appearing as a starter in a 2–1 victory over Toronto FC II in the opening match of the season. Redding made his first MLS appearance for the Red Bulls on March 31. On August 5, 2018, Redding was placed on season-ending injury reserve after undergoing shoulder surgery. Redding was released by the Red Bulls at the end of their 2018 season.

In January 2019, Redding was a trialist for Columbus Crew SC on their preseason roster.

== International career ==
Redding was named by United States U20 coach Tab Ramos to participate in the 2017 FIFA U-20 World Cup in South Korea, where he played in two of the USA's five matches.

== Career statistics ==
As of July 13, 2018

| Club | Season | League | | | Playoffs (Note: Appearance in the USL Cup Playoffs) | | Cup | | Continental | | Total | |
| Club | Season | Division | Apps | Goals | Apps | Goals | Apps | Goals | Apps | Goals | Apps | Goals |
|---|---|---|---|---|---|---|---|---|---|---|---|---|
| Orlando City (USL) | 2014 | USL | 15 | 0 | 1 | 0 | 2 | 0 | – | | 18 | 0 |
| Orlando City | 2015 | MLS | 2 | 0 | – | | 0 | 0 | – | | 2 | 0 |
| Orlando City | 2016 | MLS | 18 | 0 | – | | 2 | 0 | – | | 20 | 0 |
| Orlando City | 2017 | MLS | 18 | 0 | – | | 1 | 0 | – | | 19 | 0 |
| Orlando City | Total | | 38 | 0 | 0 | 0 | 3 | 0 | 0 | 0 | 41 | 0 |
| Wilmington Hammerheads (loan) | 2015 | USL | 1 | 0 | – | | 0 | 0 | – | | 1 | 0 |
| Orlando City B (loan) | 2016 | USL | 2 | 0 | 0 | 0 | – | | – | | 2 | 0 |
| Orlando City B (loan) | 2017 | USL | 1 | 0 | – | | – | | – | | 1 | 0 |
| Orlando City B (loan) | Total | | 3 | 0 | 0 | 0 | 0 | 0 | 0 | 0 | 3 | 0 |
| New York Red Bulls | 2018 | MLS | 1 | 0 | 0 | 0 | 0 | 0 | 0 | 0 | 1 | 0 |
| New York Red Bulls II (loan) | 2018 | USL | 2 | 0 | 0 | 0 | – | | – | | 2 | 0 |
| Career total | | | 60 | 0 | 1 | 0 | 5 | 0 | 0 | 0 | 66 | 0 |

== Honors ==
New York Red Bulls

- MLS Supporters' Shield (1): 2018

United States U20

- CONCACAF Under-20 Championship (1): 2017
