= Cristian Higuita =

Colombian footballer (born 1994)

Personal information
- Full name: Cristian Andrés Higuita Beltrán
- Date of birth: 12 January 1994 (age 32)
- Place of birth: Cali, Colombia
- Height: 1.74 m (5 ft 8 1/2 in)
- Position: Midfielder

Team information
- Current team: Atlético Junior
- Number: 13

Youth career
- Deportivo Cali

Senior career*
Years	Team	Apps	(Gls)
2011–2014	Deportivo Cali	8	(2)
2015–2019	Orlando City	103	(6)
2016	→ Orlando City B (loan)	1	(0)
2020–	Atlético Junior	6	(0)

International career
2011	Colombia U17	8	(0)
2013	Colombia U20	1	(0)
2016	Colombia Olympic	1	(0)
- * Club domestic league appearances and goals as of 4 October 2020

Cristian Higuita (born 12 January 1994) is a Colombian footballer who plays as a midfielder for Atlético Junior in Categoría Primera A.

== Club career ==
=== Deportivo Cali ===
Higuita made his debut with Deportivo Cali in 2009. A year later, he played a minor part in Cali's campaign winning the 2010 Copa Colombia. In 2011, he made his debut for Cali in Categoría Primera A and during the 2014 season helped the club capture the 2014 Superliga Colombiana.

=== Orlando City ===
In January 2015 it was reported that Orlando City SC would be signing Higuita along with his Deportivo Cali teammate Carlos Rivas. He started the team's first ever MLS game, a 1–1 draw at home to fellow new expansion side New York City on 8 March. On 1 August 2015, Higuita scored his first goal for the team in a 5–2 win at home to Columbus Crew. Higuita finished the 2015 season with 4.3 tackles per game and a passing success rate of 87.1 percent.

On 6 August 2016, in order to regain match fitness, Higuita was loaned to Orlando City B for their match against Toronto FC II. In September 2016, Higuita was ranked #21 on the MLSSoccer.com ranking of the top 24 players under 24 years of age. Higuita was one of Orlando City's protected players for the 2016 MLS Expansion Draft.

Prior to the beginning of the 2019 season, Higuita was presented with a commemorative plaque in honor of his 100 appearances with Orlando City across MLS, US Open Cup and international friendlies (namely against Ponte Preta, Flamengo and Stoke City). Higuita's contract expired at the end of the 2019 season. He departed as the club's leading appearance maker with 108 across all competitions.

=== Atlético Junior ===
On 17 December 2019, Higuita returned to Colombia to sign with Atlético Junior.

== International career ==
Higuita was called up to represent the Colombia U20s at the 2013 South American Youth Football Championship. Higuita made one appearance in the tournament, coming on as a half-time substitute in a 2–1 group stage defeat to Chile. Colombia went on to win the tournament.

Higuita was named in Colombia's provisional squad for Copa América Centenario in 2016 but was cut from the final squad.

== Personal ==
Higuita holds a U.S. green card which qualifies him as a domestic player for MLS roster purposes.

== Career statistics ==
=== Club ===
As of 4 October 2020

Club	Season	League			Cup		Continental		Playoffs		Total	
Club	Season	Division	Apps	Goals	Apps	Goals	Apps	Goals	Apps	Goals	Apps	Goals
Deportivo Cali	2012	Primera A	2	0	0	0	—		1	0	3	0
Deportivo Cali	2014	Primera A	6	2	0	0	4	0	—		10	2
Deportivo Cali	Total		8	2	0	0	4	0	1	0	13	2
Orlando City	2015	MLS	26	1	2	0	—		—		28	1
Orlando City	2016	MLS	21	1	0	0	—		—		21	1
Orlando City	2017	MLS	26	0	0	0	—		—		26	0
Orlando City	2018	MLS	21	4	1	0	—		—		22	4
Orlando City	2019	MLS	9	0	2	0	—		—		11	0
Orlando City	Total		103	6	5	0	0	0	0	0	108	6
Orlando City B	2016	USL	1	0	—						1	0
Atlético Junior	2020	Primera A	6	0	0	0	0	0	—		6	0
Career totals			117	8	5	0	4	0	1	0	127	8

== Honors ==
Deportivo Cali

- Copa Colombia: 2010
- Superliga Colombiana: 2014

Colombia U20

- South American Youth Championship: 2013
