= Pedro Ribeiro (director) =

Portuguese stage director and designer

- Born: 1982 (age 43–44); Porto, Portugal
- Education: Escola Superior de Música e Artes do Espetáculo (ESMAE); Calouste Gulbenkian Foundation
- Occupations: Stage director, Designer
- Website: www.stagedirector.net

Pedro Ribeiro (born 1982) is a Portuguese director and designer whose career spans opera, theatre, and musical theatre. He is known for integrating visual design into dramaturgy, and has worked at venues including the Royal Opera House in London.

== Early life and training ==
Ribeiro was born in Porto, Portugal. He studied harp from an early age and took part in theatrical productions during his youth, developing an interest in the relationship between music and staged performance. Ribeiro's formal training combined visual arts, which he studied at Soares dos Reis, with theatre and performance at ESMAE in Porto. He subsequently took part in a Calouste Gulbenkian Foundation programme dedicated to opera direction.

== Career ==
=== Early career ===
Ribeiro spent several years at Teatro de Marionetas do Porto (2004–2011), where he assisted João Paulo Seara Cardoso and contributed to productions as a costume designer. It was during this period that he first encountered opera, through a staging of Encantos de Medeia by António José da Silva, which shaped his subsequent move toward directing across multiple disciplines. In 2007, he took on the role of artistic director at Companhia de Teatro Os Quatro Ventos, a company devoted to Portuguese-language dramaturgy.

=== Theatre, opera, and musical theatre ===
Ribeiro has directed a wide range of productions across classical and contemporary repertoire. Selected works include El Gato Con Botas by Xavier Montsalvatge (Linbury Theatre, Royal Opera House); Goldilocks & The Three Little Pigs by Salorian and Kimberlin (Opera Story); The Phantom of the Opera by Andrew Lloyd Webber (Coliseu do Porto; Campo Pequeno); The Sound of Music by Rodgers and Hammerstein (Super Bock Arena; Altice Arena); St John Passion by J.S. Bach (Centro Cultural Vila Flor); Il viaggio a Reims by Gioachino Rossini (concert staging, Royal Opera House); and several plays for Companhia de Teatro Os Quatro Ventos, including Fígados de Tigre, Terror e Miséria na Queda da Democracia, and Gladiadores.

He has also been involved in educational and outreach initiatives, including an opera laboratory for the European Network of Opera Academies (ENOA), where he directed Outra Margem by Nuno da Rocha and Rita Fernandes at the Gulbenkian Foundation.

=== Royal Opera House ===
In 2011, Ribeiro was selected for the Jette Parker Young Artists Programme at the Royal Opera House (now known as the Royal Ballet and Opera), becoming one of the first Portuguese artists to join the programme, alongside soprano Susana Gaspar.

During his two-year residency, he created new productions at the Linbury Studio Theatre and served as assistant to directors including Robert Carsen, Kasper Holten, Laurent Pelly, John Copley, Moshe Leiser and Patrice Caurier. He worked alongside singers such as Joyce DiDonato, Jonas Kaufmann, Lisette Oropesa, and Plácido Domingo. After completing the programme, he continued to collaborate with the Royal Opera House on a freelance basis, directing repertory revivals on the main stage.

== Style and critical reception ==
International critics have described Ribeiro's approach as visually driven yet dramatically precise. The Guardian called his staging "minimal, but always to the point"; The Times noted his ability to captivate both young and adult audiences; Opera Magazine praised his work as "simply but strikingly staged"; Bachtrack described a production as "spellbinding"; BroadwayWorld called his concert staging "stunning"; and Classical Source highlighted his "fantastically imaginative" direction.

Across his work, Ribeiro frequently uses scenography, costumes, puppetry, and objects as active narrative elements, a tendency especially visible in productions such as El Gato Con Botas, Mozart & Salieri, Goldilocks & The Three Little Pigs, and Little Shop of Horrors.

== Teaching and other activities ==
As a teacher, Ribeiro has led workshops on acting and movement in several European countries. He was also involved in the London fringe theatre scene as an Offies assessor from 2012 to 2017. His international development includes residencies at the Opera Academy of Verona and at LOD/La Monnaie in Brussels, focusing on new approaches to music theatre staging.
