= Scott Sutter =

Swiss footballer (born 1986)

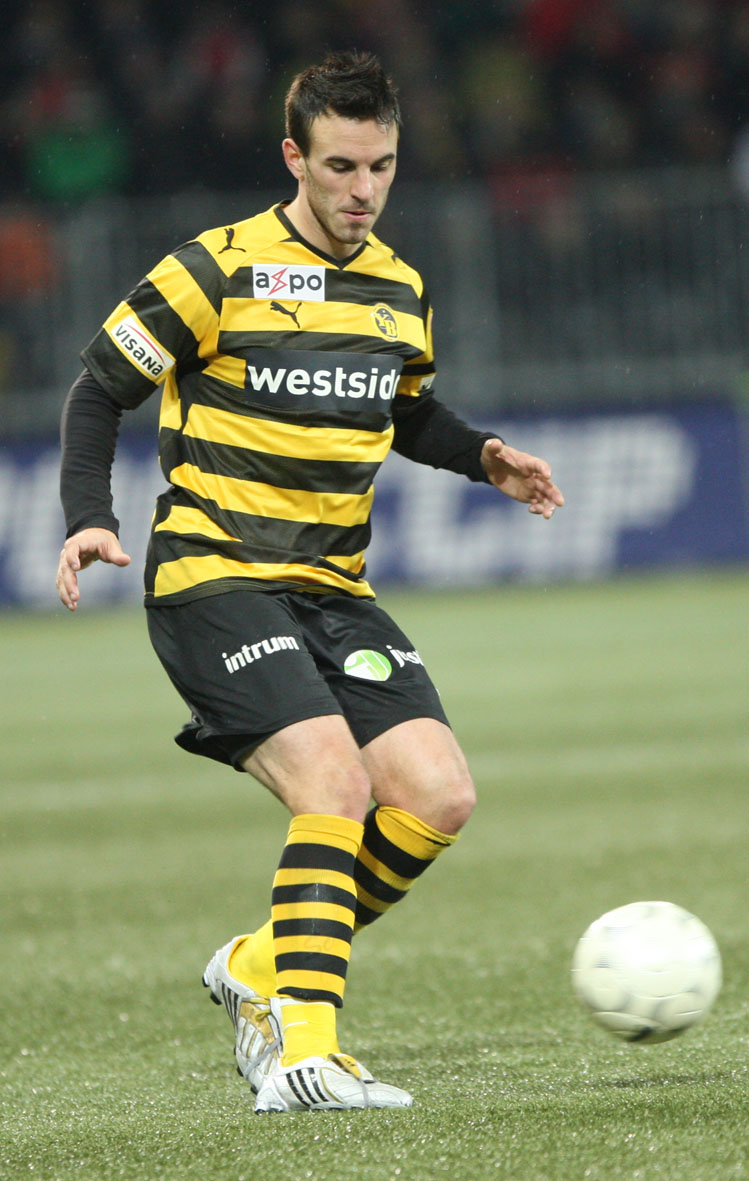

Personal information
- Full name: Scott Lee Sutter
- Date of birth: 13 May 1986 (age 40)
- Place of birth: Enfield, London, England
- Height: 1.80 m (5 ft 11 in)
- Position: Right-back

Youth career
- 1996–1998: Millwall
- 1998–2000: Barnet
- 2000–2002: Aston Villa
- 2002–2003: Charlton Athletic
- 2003: Grasshoppers

Senior career*
Years	Team	Apps	(Gls)
2003–2009	Grasshoppers	62	(2)
2009–2017	Young Boys	185	(5)
2012	→ Zürich (loan)	13	(1)
2017–2018	Orlando City SC	51	(4)
2019	Vancouver Whitecaps FC	16	(1)

International career
2005–2006	Switzerland U21	2	(0)
2010	Switzerland	2	(0)
- * Club domestic league appearances and goals

Scott Lee Sutter (born 13 May 1986) is a former professional footballer who played as a right-back. Previously he spent 14 years playing in the Swiss Super League for Grasshopper Zürich, FC Zürich and Young Boys and in Major League Soccer for Orlando City SC and Vancouver Whitecaps FC. Born in England, Sutter represented Switzerland at the under-21 and the senior level.

== Early life ==
Sutter was born in Enfield, and grew up in Potters Bar, Hertfordshire where his family still live. Sutter is the son of an English-born mother of Polish descent and a Swiss father. He attended Chancellor's School in Brookmans Park, Hertfordshire and was a childhood fan of Tottenham Hotspur.

== Club career ==
=== Grasshoppers ===
Sutter moved to Switzerland in 2002 aged 16 to join Grasshopper Club Zürich. After one year in the U18s and U21s he was called up to the main squad. His first game came aged 18 against Neuchâtel Xamax. He established himself as a first team regular and played in over 80 games including UEFA Cup qualification and group stages in the last two years. At the start of the 2007–08 season Sutter sustained a serious injury to his right ankle and underwent an operation which was successful.

=== Young Boys ===
In June 2009 Sutter moved to Young Boys from Grasshoppers, signing a contract until June 2012. He scored his first goal for the Bern club on 29 October 2009, in a 7–1 away league victory over Bellinzona. He made appearances for Young Boys in the 2010–11 UEFA Champions League, against Fenerbahçe and Tottenham Hotspur.

In January 2012 Sutter was in talks with English club Blackburn Rovers with regards to a possible transfer. On 14 February 2012 he joined Swiss club FC Zürich on loan till the end of the season.

=== Orlando City SC ===
On 3 March 2017, Sutter was signed by MLS club Orlando City SC. He made his debut on 1 April, appearing as a substitute away at Columbus Crew before making his first start the following weekend, beating New York Red Bulls 1–0 at home. Sutter's first goal for Orlando and his only one of the 2017 season came on 22 June 2017, heading home a Kaká free kick in stoppage time to earn a 1–1 draw at Seattle. Between 5 August and 2 September 2018, Sutter had a notably productive goal-spell scoring 3 times in 4 games, 2 of which were stoppage time equalizers against New England Revolution and Philadelphia Union respectively. At the end of the 2018 season the club announced they had declined his contract option, making him a free agent.

=== Vancouver Whitecaps FC ===
On 30 January 2019, Sutter joined MLS club Vancouver Whitecaps FC. He was released by Vancouver at the end of the season.

== International career ==
In November 2005, Sutter featured for the Switzerland U21s in a UEFA European Under-21 Championship qualification playoff match against Portugal and played a further youth friendly against Romania the following April. Despite receiving a call up for the Swiss senior team in late 2006, Sutter stated that he no longer wished to be considered for selection for the Swiss national side as he wanted to play for England: "It hit me when I was in a bar supporting England with all my mates, wearing my England shirt and I knew that the next week I was going to be playing for Switzerland. It just didn't feel right. I was English".

However, in August 2010 he accepted another call up for the Swiss squad and made his debut on 3 September as a halftime substitute in a 0–0 friendly draw with Australia after replacing Stephan Lichtsteiner. "Switzerland has given me so much," Sutter said explaining the decision to play for the Swiss national team. "I went through so much with my injury and they gave me the opportunity to play. I would be stupid to turn it down because at one point I didn't think I would play football again. Switzerland is my home but it is also out of gratitude. It is my way of giving something back." He featured in one more international match for Switzerland, a 1–0 away defeat to Montenegro in a qualifier for UEFA Euro 2012.

== Coaching career ==
As of 2026, Sutter held an UEFA A Licence for coaching. On 19 March 2025, National Women's Soccer League team and Orlando City SC affiliate Orlando Pride announced the hiring of Sutter as the club's player development coach. He also previously served as a volunteer assistant for the University of Virginia Cavaliers men's soccer team and under-15 academy head coach for D.C. United.

== Personal life ==
Sutter holds a U.S. green card which qualified him as a domestic player for MLS roster purposes.

== Career statistics ==
=== Club ===
Appearances and goals by club, season and competition
Club	Season	League			Cup		Continental		Other (Note: Includes UEFA Intertoto Cup.)		Total	
Club	Season	Division	Apps	Goals	Apps	Goals	Apps	Goals	Apps	Goals	Apps	Goals
Grasshoppers	2003–04	Swiss Super League	1	0	0	0	—		—		1	0
Grasshoppers	2004–05	Swiss Super League	1	0	0	0	—		—		1	0
Grasshoppers	2005–06	Swiss Super League	27	0	2	0	7	0	—		36	0
Grasshoppers	2006–07	Swiss Super League	30	2	3	0	8	3	4	0	45	5
Grasshoppers	2007–08	Swiss Super League	0	0	0	0	—		—		0	0
Grasshoppers	2008–09	Swiss Super League	3	0	0	0	—		—		3	0
Grasshoppers	Total		62	2	5	0	15	3	4	0	86	5
Young Boys	2009–10	Swiss Super League	28	1	4	0	2	0	—		34	1
Young Boys	2010–11	Swiss Super League	32	0	1	0	12	2	—		45	2
Young Boys	2011–12	Swiss Super League	13	0	2	0	1	0	—		16	0
Young Boys	2012–13	Swiss Super League	25	0	3	0	10	0	—		38	0
Young Boys	2013–14	Swiss Super League	29	2	2	0	0	0	—		31	2
Young Boys	2014–15	Swiss Super League	24	0	2	0	7	0	—		33	0
Young Boys	2015–16	Swiss Super League	15	1	1	0	4	0	—		20	1
Young Boys	2016–17	Swiss Super League	19	1	3	0	10	0	—		32	1
Young Boys	Total		185	5	18	0	46	2	—		249	7
Zürich (loan)	2011–12	Swiss Super League	13	1	0	0	—		—		13	1
Orlando City SC	2017	MLS	32	1	0	0	—		—		32	1
Orlando City SC	2018	MLS	19	3	0	0	—		—		19	3
Orlando City SC	Total		51	4	0	0	0	0	0	0	51	4
Career total			311	12	23	0	61	5	4	0	399	17

=== International ===
Appearances and goals by national team and year
National team	Year	Apps	Goals
Switzerland	2010	2	0
Switzerland	2011	0	0
Total		2	0
