= Rafael Ramos (footballer) =

Portuguese footballer

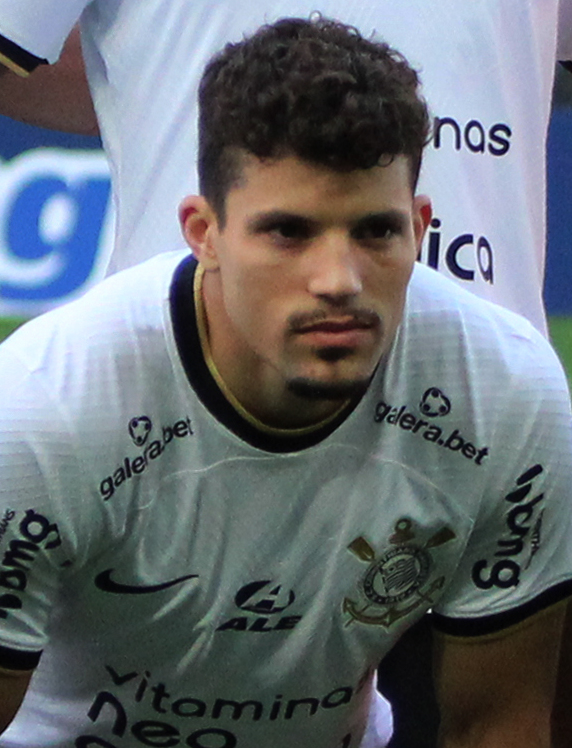
- Ramos with Corinthians in 2022

Personal information
- Full name: Rafael António Figueiredo Ramos
- Date of birth: 9 January 1995 (age 31)
- Place of birth: Seia, Portugal
- Height: 1.74 m (5 ft 9 in)
- Position: Right-back

Team information
- Current team: Ceará
- Number: 2

Youth career
- 2006–2012: Sporting CP
- 2012–2013: Real Massamá
- 2013–2014: Benfica

Senior career*
Years	Team	Apps	(Gls)
2014	Orlando City	4	(1)
2015–2017	Orlando City	39	(0)
2016–2017	Orlando City B	9	(0)
2018	Chicago Fire	3	(0)
2018–2019	Twente	19	(0)
2019–2022	Santa Clara	69	(0)
2022–2024	Corinthians	24	(0)
2024–	Ceará	76	(2)

International career
2014	Portugal U19	1	(0)
2014–2015	Portugal U20	2	(0)
- * Club domestic league appearances and goals as of 18 November 2026

Rafael António Figueiredo Ramos (born 9 January 1995) is a Portuguese professional footballer who plays as a right-back for Brazilian club Ceará.

Formed at Sporting and Benfica, he spent his early professional career in the United States with Orlando City and Chicago Fire in Major League Soccer. After winning the Dutch Eerste Divisie with Twente in 2019, he spent three years in the Primeira Liga with Santa Clara before joining Ceará SC

== Club career ==
=== Early years ===
Born in Santa Marinha, Seia, Guarda District, Ramos started out his career with Sporting CP before being released in 2012. He then joined Real S.C. for one year before moving to S.L. Benfica's youth system in 2013, where he joined the under-19 squad. He was part of the squad that competed in the 2013–14 UEFA Youth League. On 5 May 2014, Ramos signed a contract to stay with Benfica until 2020.

=== Orlando City ===
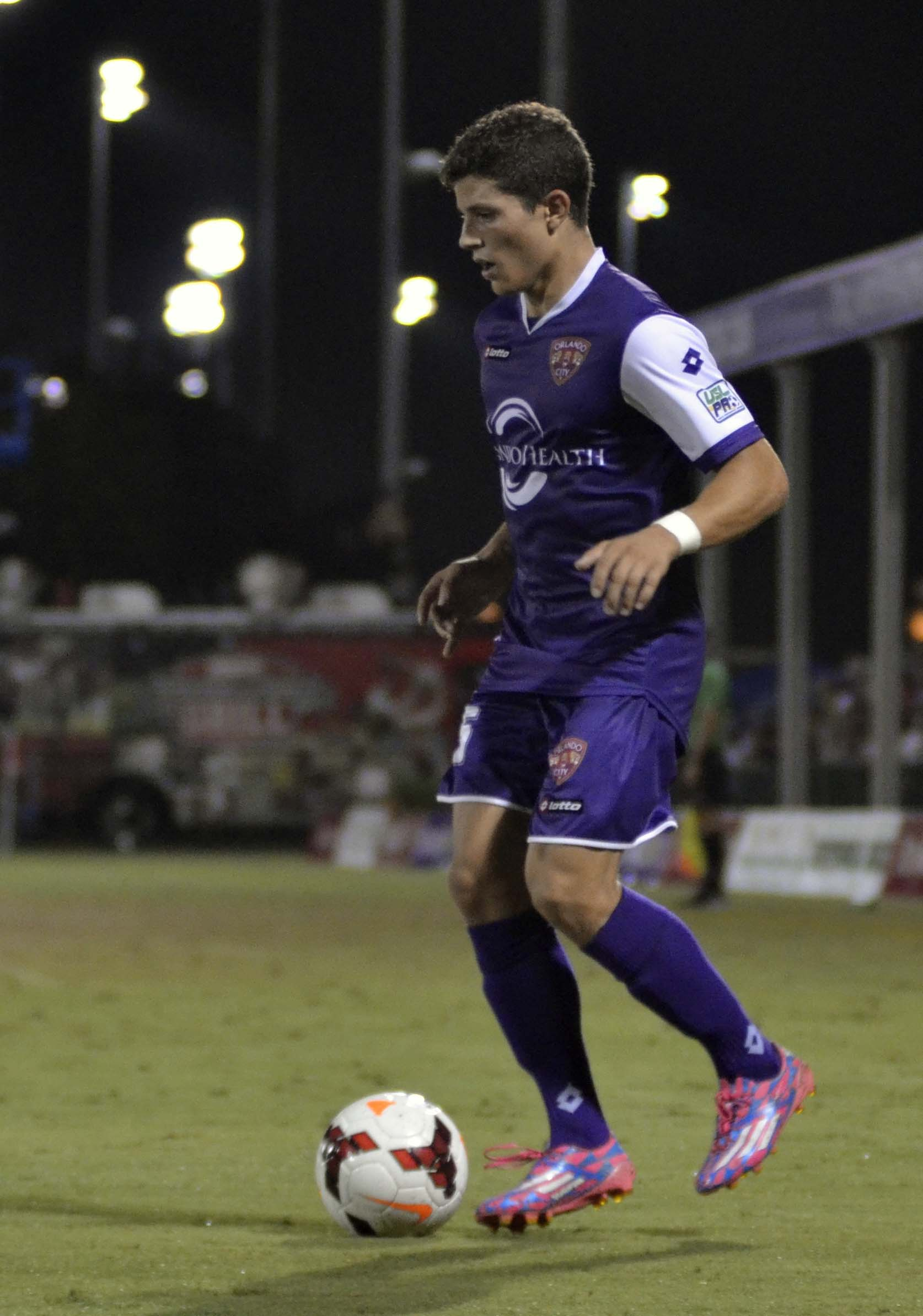
Ramos playing for Orlando City in 2014

On 8 July 2014, Ramos and Benfica teammate Estrela were transferred to Orlando City SC of the USL Pro, the third level of the United States soccer league system, on 3 1/2-year professional contracts as part of an affiliation between the two clubs. The contracts would include the remainder of the 2014 USL Pro season before the team joined Major League Soccer in 2015. The pair made their professional debuts on 23 August against Richmond Kickers, in which Ramos scored a 70th-minute winner in a 3–2 away victory. Head coach Adrian Heath said of them after the game, "I thought that the two new players (Estrela and Ramos) were outstanding, considering that they haven't played for two or three weeks. Their contribution was massive..."

Ramos played in Orlando's first MLS game on 8 March 2015, a 1–1 home draw with fellow expansion team New York City FC. He was sent off twice over the season, for a foul on Waylon Francis in a 3–0 loss at Columbus Crew on 19 April, and a 36th-minute challenge on Justin Morrow in a 5–0 loss at Toronto FC on 22 August. He totalled 39 MLS appearances for Orlando and assisted five goals. On 4 June 2017, making his first start of the season and only his third in the past 12 months due to hamstring injuries, he lasted 26 minutes before another red card in a goalless draw with Chicago Fire SC at the Citrus Bowl.

=== Chicago Fire ===
On 18 January 2018, Ramos was traded to Chicago Fire in exchange for the rights to Cameron Lindley and $100,000 of Targeted Allocation Money. He made his debut on 17 March in a 2–1 loss at Minnesota United FC, one of only five games during his time in Illinois, three in the league and two in the U.S. Open Cup.

=== Twente ===
On 6 August 2018, Chicago and Ramos mutually agreed to part ways. Later that day, Dutch team FC Twente signed him on a one-year contract with the option of a second. He helped the team win the 2018–19 Eerste Divisie title and promotion back to the Eredivisie.

=== Santa Clara ===
On 2 July 2019, Ramos returned to his native Portugal to sign with C.D. Santa Clara of the Primeira Liga.

=== Corinthians ===
On 12 April 2022, Ramos went to Brazil to sign a two-year deal with Sport Club Corinthians Paulista, under compatriot manager Vítor Pereira. He made his debut in the Campeonato Brasileiro Série A four days later, starting in a 3–0 home win over Avaí FC and being praised by the coach.

== Personal life ==
Ramos holds a U.S. green card which qualified him as a domestic player for MLS roster purposes.

== Career statistics ==
As of match played 19 July 2023

Appearances and goals by club, season and competition
Club	Season	League			State league		National cup (Note: Includes U.S. Open Cup, KNVB Cup, Taça de Portugal, Copa do Brasil)		League cup (Note: Includes Taça da Liga)		Continental		Total	
Club	Season	Division	Apps	Goals	Apps	Goals	Apps	Goals	Apps	Goals	Apps	Goals	Apps	Goals
Orlando City	2014	USL Pro	4	1	—		—		—		—		4	1
Orlando City	2015	MLS	25	0	—		3	0	—		—		28	0
Orlando City	2016	MLS	12	0	—		1	0	—		—		13	0
Orlando City	2017	MLS	2	0	—		1	0	—		—		3	0
Orlando City	Total		39	0	—		5	0	—		—		44	0
Orlando City B	2016	USL	2	0	—		—		—		—		2	0
Orlando City B	2017	USL	7	0	—		—		—		—		7	0
Orlando City B	Total		9	0	—		—		—		—		9	0
Chicago Fire	2018	MLS	3	0	—		2	0	—		—		5	0
Twente	2018–19	Eerste Divisie	19	0	—		2	0	—		—		21	0
Santa Clara	2019–20	Primeira Liga	16	0	—		2	0	2	0	—		20	0
Santa Clara	2020–21	Primeira Liga	30	0	—		2	0	—		—		32	0
Santa Clara	2021–22	Primeira Liga	23	0	—		2	0	2	0	5 (Note: Appearances in UEFA Europa Conference League)	0	32	0
Santa Clara	Total		69	0	—		6	0	4	0	5	0	84	0
Corinthians	2022	Série A	20	0	0	0	3	0	—		1 (Note: Appearance in Copa Libertadores)	0	24	0
Corinthians	2023	Série A	0	0	4 (Note: Appearances in Campeonato Paulista)	0	0	0	—		3 (Note: One appearance in Copa Libertadores, two appearances in Copa Sudamericana)	0	7	0
Corinthians	Total		20	0	4	0	3	0	—		4	0	31	0
Career total			163	1	4	0	18	0	4	0	9	0	198	1

== Honours ==
Benfica U20

- UEFA Youth League: runner-up 2013–14

Twente

- Eerste Divisie: 2018–19

Corinthians

- Copa do Brasil: runner-up 2022

Ceará

- Campeonato Cearense: 2024, 2025; runner-up: 2026
