= Pedro Ribeiro (Brazilian footballer) =

Brazilian footballer

Personal information
- Full name: Pedro Nezio de Araújo Lopes Ribeiro
- Date of birth: 13 June 1990 (age 36)
- Place of birth: Belo Horizonte, Brazil
- Height: 1.93 m (6 ft 4 in)
- Positions: Attacking midfielder; forward

Team information
- Current team: Västerås SK
- Number: 7

College career
Years	Team	Apps	(Gls)
2010–2013	Coastal Carolina Chanticleers	86	(31)

Senior career*
Years	Team	Apps	(Gls)
2012	Reading United	14	(6)
2014	Philadelphia Union	9	(2)
2014	→ Harrisburg City Islanders (loan)	13	(4)
2015–2016	Orlando City	21	(2)
2016	→ Orlando City B (loan)	2	(0)
2017	Harrisburg City Islanders	19	(3)
2018	Fresno FC	32	(2)
2019	IK Frej	28	(5)
2020–	Västerås SK	103	(4)
- * Club domestic league appearances and goals as of 12 November 2025

Pedro Nezio de Araújo Lopes Ribeiro (born 13 June 1990) is a Brazilian footballer who currently plays for Västerås SK in the Swedish Superettan.

== Playing career ==
=== Youth and college ===
Growing up in Belo Horizonte, Brazil, Ribeiro played college soccer at Coastal Carolina beginning in 2010. During his time with Coastal Carolina, Ribeiro won multiple Big South Regular Season titles (3) and Big South Tournament Titles (2) contributing 31 goals and 26 assists.

=== Club ===
==== Philadelphia Union ====
Ribeiro was selected as the 15th overall pick of the 2014 MLS SuperDraft by Philadelphia Union, who were familiar with him from a brief stint with their affiliate team, Reading United. Ribeiro made his professional debut and start on August 15 against Houston Dynamo. His first goal for the Union was scored in his third appearance in a home match against New York Red Bulls.

Ahead of the 2015 season, Ribeiro was selected by expansion side Orlando City SC in the 2014 MLS Expansion Draft.

===== Loan to Harrisburg =====
During the 2014 season, Ribeiro was loaned to Philadelphia USL affiliate Harrisburg City Islanders where he would make 12 appearances and scoring 4 goals.

==== Orlando City ====
Ribeiro's debut with Orlando came on 13 March 2015, away to the Houston Dynamo; he replaced Carlos Rivas in the 54th minute and twenty minutes later put pressure on Tyler Deric, leading the goalkeeper to score an own goal to give Orlando a 1–0 win. Pedro also scored in the 29th minute at Montreal and 89th minute at home against the Columbus Crew SC, both resulting in 2–2 draws.

Ribeiro was released by Orlando in November 2016 after not exercising his contract option.

==== Harrisburg City Islanders ====
Ribeiro signed with United Soccer League side Harrisburg City Islanders on 14 April 2017.

==== Fresno FC ====
Following a season with USL side Fresno FC, Ribeiro joined Swedish Superettan side IK Frej on 18 January 2019.

==== IK Frej ====
After one season with IK Freg, Ribeiro moved to Västerås SK on 29 November 2019, ahead of their 2020 season.

== Personal ==
Ribiero earned his U.S. green card in summer 2015. This status also qualifies him as a domestic player for MLS roster purposes.
