= Susana Gaspar (singer) =

Portuguese operatic soprano (born 1981)

Susana Gaspar (born 1981) is a Portuguese operatic soprano.

Gaspar studied at the Lisbon Music Conservatory, the Guildhall School of Music and Drama, where she graduated with a MMus degree, and at the National Opera Studio.

In 2011, Gaspar made her debut with The Royal Opera as Barbarina in Le nozze di Figaro.

== Operatic repertoire ==
- Papagena in Die Zauberflöte
- Giannetta in L'elisir d'amore
- Voice from Heaven in Don Carlo
- Barbarina in Le nozze di Figaro
- Mimi in La bohème
- Violetta in La Traviata
