= Carlos Rivas (footballer, born 1994) =

Colombian footballer

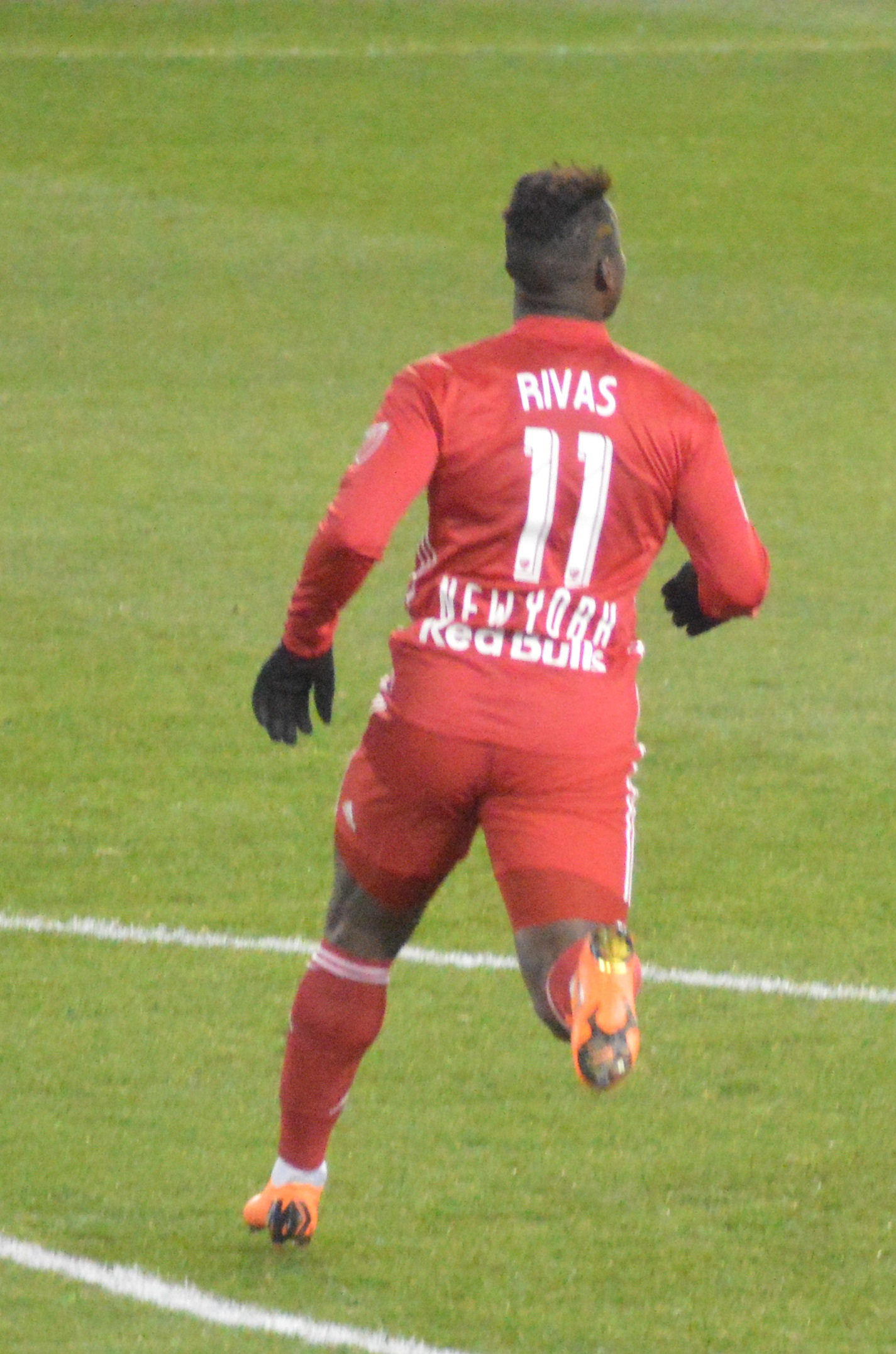
- Carlos Rivas playing for New York Red Bulls in 2018

Personal information
- Full name: Carlos Augusto Rivas Murillo
- Date of birth: 15 April 1994 (age 32)
- Place of birth: Jamundí, Valle, Colombia
- Height: 1.72 m (5 ft 8 in)
- Positions: Forward; winger

Youth career
- 2009: América de Cali
- 2010–2011: Once Caldas

Senior career*
Years	Team	Apps	(Gls)
2011–2013	Once Caldas	10	(0)
2013–2014	Deportivo Cali	36	(13)
2015–2017	Orlando City	78	(8)
2018–2019	New York Red Bulls	5	(2)
2018	New York Red Bulls II	3	(1)
2018–2019	→ Atlético Nacional (loan)	13	(0)
2019–2020	Hapoel Ra'anana	3	(0)
2020	Deportivo Cuenca	7	(1)
2021	Llaneros	14	(5)
2022	La Equidad	17	(2)
2023	Juan Aurich	9	(1)
2024	Patriotas	2	(0)
2024	Chattanooga FC	10	(0)
- * Club domestic league appearances and goals as of 03:40, 13 March 2024 (CST)

Carlos Augusto Rivas Murillo (born 15 April 1994) is a Colombian professional footballer who plays as a forward.

== Club career ==
=== Once Caldas ===
Born in Jamundí, Rivas began his career in the youth ranks of local club Jamundí F. C.. In 2009 he joined the youth ranks of América de Cali, but only stayed at the club for six months. After leaving América he joined Once Caldas. Rivas eventually joined the first team and made his Categoría Primera A debut in 2012. On 9 May 2012, Rivas scored his first goal as a professional, scoring a late winner in a 3–2 victory over Fortaleza C.E.I.F. in a Copa Colombia match.

=== Deportivo Cali ===
In 2013 Rivas joined Deportivo Cali at the request of coach Leonel Álvarez, with the club eventually buying his rights during June 2014. On 14 August 2013, Rivas made his debut for his new club in a 1–1 draw with Unión Magdalena in Copa Colombia, a match in which Deportivo would advance to the next round on penalties. On 18 September 2013, Rivas scored his first goal with Deportivo Cali in a 2–1 loss to Real Cartagena which eliminated the club from the cup. On 23 November 2013, Rivas scored his first league goal to help Cali to a 2–1 victory over his former club Once Caldas.

On 29 January 2014, Rivas captured his first title with Cali as his side defeated Atlético Nacional on penalties after a 2–2 aggregate in the 2014 Superliga Colombiana. On 16 March 2014, Rivas scored his first two goals of the season to help Cali to a 2–1 victory over Patriotas Boyacá. On 8 April 2014, Rivas scored his first goal in Copa Libertadores in a 3–2 loss to Cerro Porteño. He added another brace on 3 August, in a 2–0 victory over Deportivo Pasto. On 28 August, Rivas scored his first goal in the Copa Sudamericana, helping Cali to a 3–0 victory over Peruvian side Universidad Técnica de Cajamarca. On 17 September, Rivas scored a second half equalizer to help Cali to a 2–2 draw with Peñarol at the Estadio Centenario in the Copa Sudamericana. He ended the 2014 season with 15 goals in 42 matches across all competitions.

=== Orlando City SC ===
In December 2014 it was reported that Orlando City SC would be signing Rivas for a $1.5 million fee from Deportivo Cali. On 26 January 2015, Orlando City SC officially announced the signing of Rivas. He made his debut with Orlando City on 8 March 2015 in a 1–1 draw with New York City FC. On 17 June 2015, Rivas scored his first three goals for Orlando City, all on penalty kicks, in a 4–4 draw with Charleston Battery in the U.S. Open Cup. Orlando went on to win the match after penalty kicks to advance in the tournament.

On 30 April 2016, Rivas scored his first league goal for Orlando City, scoring a late equalizer in a 2–2 draw with New England Revolution. On 29 April 2017, Rivas scored his first goal of the season in a 2–1 victory over Colorado Rapids. On 17 May 2017, Rivas came into the match as a second-half substitute and scored Orlando City's lone goal to help the club to a 1–1 draw against SJ Earthquakes.

=== New York Red Bulls ===
On 3 January 2018, Rivas was traded to New York Red Bulls, along with teammate Tommy Redding, in exchange for Sacha Kljestan and $150,000 of Target Allocation Money. On 22 February 2018, Rivas made his debut for New York, coming on in the second half in a 1–1 draw against CD Olimpia in the first leg of the round of 16 match of the CONCACAF Champions League. On March 10, 2018, he scored two goals on his Red Bulls league debut in a 4–0 victory over Portland Timbers.

During the season Rivas was loaned to New York affiliate side New York Red Bulls II, and on May 27, 2018, he scored his first goal for the side in a 4–1 victory over Indy Eleven.

On 9 July 2018, Rivas was loaned to Atlético Nacional for the remainder of 2018.

Rivas was released by New York in December 2018.

=== Hapoel Ra'anana ===
On 25 July 2019, Rivas joined Hapoel Ra'anana A.F.C. for their 2019–2020 season on a free transfer.

== Career statistics ==
As of 1 June 2018

Club	Season	League		League Cup		Domestic Cup		International		Total	
Club	Season	Apps	Goals	Apps	Goals	Apps	Goals	Apps	Goals	Apps	Goals
Once Caldas	2012	10	0	5	2	0	0	0	0	15	2
Once Caldas	2013	0	0	6	0	0	0	0	0	6	0
Once Caldas	Total	10	0	11	2	0	0	0	0	21	2
Deportivo Cali	2013	7	1	2	1	0	0	0	0	9	2
Deportivo Cali	2014	29	12	4	0	0	0	9	3	42	15
Deportivo Cali	Total	36	13	6	1	0	0	9	3	51	17
Orlando City	2015	27	0	0	0	2	4	0	0	29	4
Orlando City	2016	21	3	0	0	1	0	0	0	22	3
Orlando City	2017	30	5	0	0	1	0	0	0	31	5
Orlando City	Total	78	8	0	0	4	4	0	0	82	12
New York Red Bulls	2018	5	2	0	0	1	0	4	0	10	2
New York Red Bulls II(loan)	2018	3	1	0	0	0	0	0	0	3	1
Career total		132	24	17	3	5	4	13	3	167	34

== Personal ==
Rivas holds a U.S. green card which qualifies him as a domestic player for MLS roster purposes.
