= 2018 Orlando City SC season =

Orlando City SC
2018 season
- CEO: Alex Leitão
- Manager: Jason Kreis (until June 15); Bobby Murphy (interim, June 15 – July 1); James O'Connor (from July 2)
- Stadium: Orlando City Stadium
- MLS: Conference: 11th Overall: 22nd
- MLS Cup Playoffs: Did not qualify
- U.S. Open Cup: Quarter-finals
- Top goalscorer: League: Dom Dwyer (13); All: Dom Dwyer (13)
- Highest home attendance: MLS: 25,527 (Twice)
- Lowest home attendance: MLS: 22,337 (April 8 vs. Portland Timbers)
- Average home league attendance: 23,979
- Biggest win: PHI 0–2 ORL (April 13)
- Biggest defeat: ATL 4–0 ORL (June 30); CHI 4–0 ORL (Sept 16)
| Home colors | Away colors |

The 2018 Orlando City SC season was the club's eighth season of existence in Orlando and fourth season in Major League Soccer, the top-flight league in the United States soccer league system. Alongside Major League Soccer, the club also competed in the U.S. Open Cup. The team played its home games at Orlando City Stadium.

== Season review ==
=== Pre-season ===
We want guys who want to compete, who want to win and who feel the pain when we don't win. Every single player we've brought (during the offseason) has sat down with me, looked me in the eye and told me they want to win and they want to be here for the right reasons.

— HC Jason Kreis, on the roster revamp

On December 17, 2017, Kaká announced his retirement, after turning down offers from former clubs São Paulo FC and A.C. Milan. With the options of several players declined at the end of the previous season, Orlando City set its sights on the off-season to rebuild its roster. The club began the winter transfer window by acquiring midfielder Sacha Kljestan from the New York Red Bulls in exchange for attacker Carlos Rivas and defender Tommy Redding. During this time, it was announced that Orlando City B had elected to not participate in the 2018 USL season, sparking alarm in regards to the club's youth development and depth. Just a few days later, Paraguayan midfielder Josué Colmán signed with the club as a Young Designated Player.

In early January, Orlando City Stadium played host to two games in the 2018 edition of the Florida Cup. This was followed by the club also hosting the 2018 MLS Combine from January 11 to 17, which resulted in forward Chris Mueller being picked by Orlando City in the MLS SuperDraft.

By mid-January, attention shifted to forward Cyle Larin after images of him undergoing a medical with Beşiktaş J.K. were posted on the Turkish club's Twitter account. While Orlando City was aware of the social media posting, no transfer agreement had been made at that time and the club was preparing to take legal action as Larin was still "under contract with Orlando City through 2019." When training camp officially commenced on January 22, Larin was absent and appeared to be training with Beşiktaş in a video released the following day. A week later, Orlando City announced that they had come to terms with Beşiktaş for the transfer of Larin.

On January 29, it was announced that Orlando City had acquired midfielder Justin Meram from Columbus Crew SC in exchange for $1.05 million in allocation money plus an international roster spot. Further transfers were made throughout January and February, with a total of 13 new players making the move to Orlando. On February 28, center back Jonathan Spector was named the new captain of Orlando City following Kaká's departure.

=== March ===
Orlando City began their fourth Major League Soccer campaign on March 3 at home against D.C. United. Despite Joe Bendik making a penalty save early on, D.C. United opened the scoring in the 32nd minute with a Yamil Asad free kick. In the 41st minute, PC was issued a red card and Orlando City played the remainder of the game with 10 men. The Lions maintained pressure throughout the second half and eventually equalized in stoppage time following a forward run by Jonathan Spector that set Stefano Pinho up for his debut goal, securing a point with a 1–1 draw. Orlando remained at home for its second match, falling 2–1 to Minnesota United FC following a brace by Ethan Finlay. The club then hit the road for its first away match of the season against New York City FC. This marked the first Orlando City appearances for Lamine Sané and Josué Colmán, who both came on as second half subs, as well as Sacha Kljestan. Despite holding a 0–0 scoreline at half, the Lions ended up falling 2–0 from goals by Ismael Tajouri and Maxi Moralez. Following a two-week hiatus, Orlando City returned home to host the New York Red Bulls. After conceding in the seventh minute, City soon struck back with a tap-in goal by Will Johnson. The Red Bulls regained the lead shortly after, but the Lions equalized once again via a Dom Dwyer header to end the half at 2–2. Dwyer opened the second half with a goal that came from a throw-in assist by Mohamed El Monir. The visitors were able to level the scoreline in the 82nd minute, but a shot from Scott Sutter that deflected off of Colmán made its way into the back of the net and secured City all three points in the club's first victory of the 2018 Major League Soccer season.

=== April ===
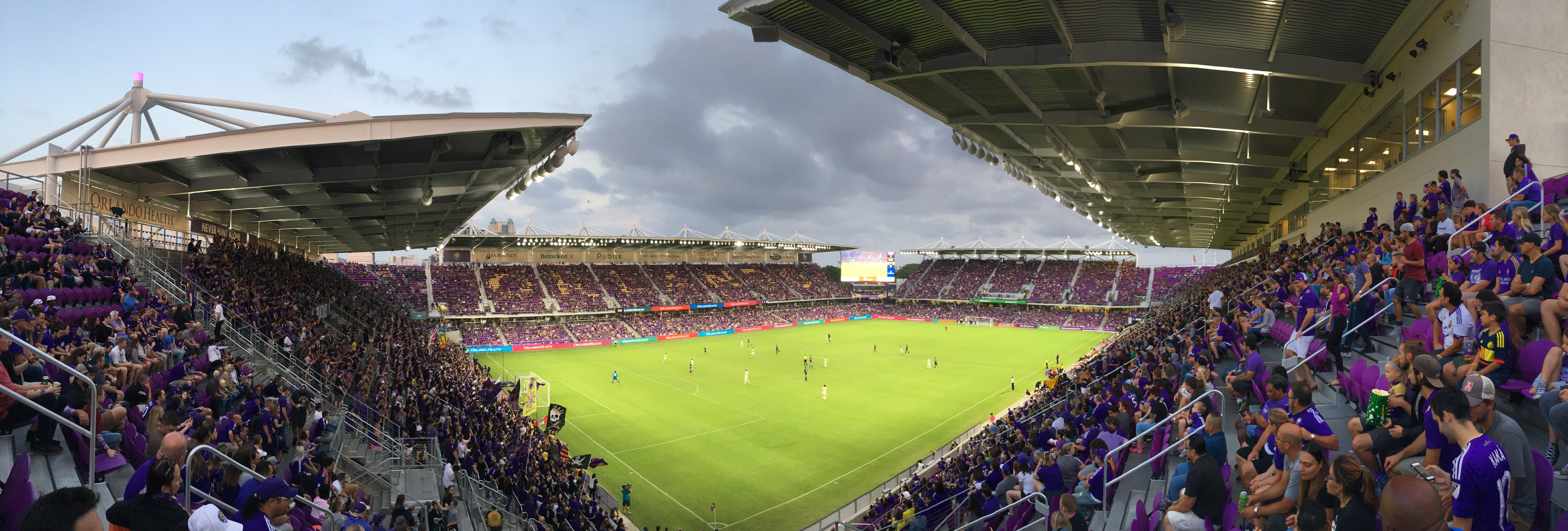
Orlando SC takes on the visiting San Jose Earthquakes

On April 8, the Lions made team history by securing their first win from a 2-goal deficit, with Dwyer scoring the game-winning goal in the 87th minute for a dramatic 3–2 comeback victory against the Portland Timbers. The result also marked the first back-to-back wins for the club since April 29, 2017. With all three goals scored in the final ten minutes, they led the league with 25 in the last three seasons, reaffirming the nickname "Cardiac Cats." Five days later, Joe Bendik picked up his first clean sheet of the season to go along with four saves, while Dwyer scored his 99th goal in all career caps, for the Lions' first away win of the season: a 2–0 shutout of the Philadelphia Union. The winning streak stretched to four in a 3–2 home victory against the San Jose Earthquakes, courtesy of goals from Mueller, Kljestan, and Dwyer. Both Mueller and Dwyer's goals were milestones: Mueller's strike came 63 seconds into the match, making it the fastest MLS goal in the club's history, and Dwyer's goal marked his 100th career goal in all competitions. Then, in yet another come-from-behind thriller and their fifth straight win to close out the month, Orlando City defeated the Colorado Rapids with a 2–1 scoreline at the high altitude of DSG Park.

=== May ===
The first major test of the season comes early, as four of the next five matches for Orlando City come against the top four 2017 Eastern Conference teams: Atlanta United FC, Toronto FC, the Chicago Fire, and New York City FC. A new club record was reached as the "Cardiac Cats" opened the month of May with their sixth straight victory, and fourth when conceding the first goal, in a 3–1 result against Real Salt Lake. Lamine Sané scored his first goal in purple, while Chris Schuler made his debut in the squad's starting 11, against his former team. On May 13, Justin Meram opened his account with a second-half goal against the Five Stripes. However, the Lions' comeback fell short in a 2–1 loss, their second of the season at home. The game was marred by fans throwing trash onto the field in frustration. Orlando City was later criticized by local authorities and news organizations for routinely condemning behavior without taking any significant action to decrease such incidents. The rough patch continued with another 2–1 loss at Toronto FC. A 2–1 defeat at home to the Chicago Fire extended the losing streak to three games to close out the month, as the Lions looked ahead to a 4-game, 12-day road trip with stops in New York, Miami, Vancouver, and Montreal.

=== June ===
The losing streak continued into the month of June, as Orlando City fell 3–0 to New York City FC. With Dom Dwyer out due to injury, the Lions have found it difficult to score in their last four matches. The club was able to turn things around in their first match of the 2018 U.S. Open Cup when they defeated NPSL side Miami United FC 3–0 with goals from PC, Stefano Pinho, and Dillon Powers. However, the club's MLS losing streak stretched to five games after the Lions were reduced to 10 men and were outscored 5–2 in Vancouver. The 12-day road trip came to an end in Montreal, where Orlando City suffered its third consecutive three-goal margin defeat. Two days later, the club announced that it had parted ways with head coach Jason Kreis and that assistant coach Bobby Murphy would assume the role of interim coach. Under Bobby's leadership, and changing to a three-back formation that showed much-improved stability in the defense, the Lions were able to eke out a 1–1 win on PKs (4–2), against D.C. United in the Round of 16 in the U.S. Open Cup on June 20. Orlando played their first MLS match following Kreis' departure on June 23, 2018, when they faced Montreal for the second consecutive game. Murphy continued with the three-back formation he had used in the Open Cup four days earlier but Orlando fell to a 2–0 defeat, only registering one shot on target on the way to their seventh consecutive league defeat, a performance Bobby and several of the players apologized for post-game.

On June 29, the club announced that Louisville City FC manager and former Orlando City player-coach James O'Connor would take over as the Lion's new head coach. The day after, Murphy took control of his final game as interim manager prior to O'Connor filling the position permanently. The result was a 4–0 defeat away to Atlanta United FC.

=== July ===
James O'Connor's first game in charge was away at Los Angeles FC, marking the first time Orlando had ever played the new expansion side. The original kick off time was moved to 11:00 p.m. ET to avoid triple-digit temperatures. The team returned to the 4–2–3–1 formation that had been implemented earlier in the season under Jason Kreis but lost 4–1, breaking their three-game scoreless streak but extending the losing streak to nine. On July 14, O'Connor took charge of his first home game with the visit of Toronto FC. Orlando won 2–1 to end their winless streak. It was the first MLS match of the season to not feature Joe Bendik after Earl Edwards Jr. was given the start in goal. Orlando were knocked out of the U.S. Open Cup at the quarterfinals stage on July 18, losing 1–0 away to Philadelphia Union. On July 22, Orlando traveled to Columbus Crew SC where they led for most of the match. However, a penalty call and a controversial lack of VAR led to a game-tying 88th-minute penalty. Columbus would go on to win the game 3–2 in stoppage time. In response, Professional Referee Organization released a statement acknowledging the error and reaffirming that the organization holds all officials "accountable and takes appropriate action when necessary." Orlando returned home to face NYCFC for the third and final time of the year on July 26, falling to a 2–0 defeat and hitting the woodwork four times in the process. Then, despite taking the lead three times, Orlando lost 4–3 away to LA Galaxy on July 29, a game in which Cristian Higuita broke Cyle Larin's club record 89 appearances. Galaxy's Zlatan Ibrahimović notably scored his first MLS hattrick in the game.

=== August ===
On August 3, Orlando City traded Justin Meram back to Columbus Crew SC for $750,000 in Targeted Allocation Money and a 2019 international roster slot. The following day, the Lions returned home to face New England Revolution. After trailing by two goals early on, City equalized in the 71st minute. While New England gained the lead five minutes later, the Lions equalized again in stoppage time – resulting in a 3–3 draw. The team ended the month with two losses, both by a one-goal margin, to DC United and Atlanta United FC. The DC game marked the first time Orlando played at the newly opened Audi Field.

=== September ===
On September 1, Orlando hosted Philadelphia Union and held them to a 2–2 draw thanks to a Scott Sutter goal in stoppage time. It was the first time Orlando had avoided defeat against the same opponent twice in MLS this season. The following weekend the team lost 1–0 away to Sporting Kansas City as Dom Dwyer returned to face his former team for the first time. The team finished the month winless, losing on two away trips to Sporting Kansas City and Chicago Fire before earning a 0–0 draw at home to Houston Dynamo, with Adam Grinwis securing only the team's second league clean sheet of the season on his debut.

=== October ===
Prior to the team's game against FC Dallas on October 6, Orlando were officially eliminated from playoff contention following Montreal's win over Columbus Crew earlier that day. They went on to lose 2–0. Orlando remained on the road for the next match against New England Revolution which also ended 2–0 and extending the team's scoreless run to five games. On October 17 the team set a new MLS single season record for number of goals conceded when Víctor Rodríguez opened the scoring for Seattle Sounders FC, the 71st goal Orlando had given up that year. This surpassed the previous total of 70 set by Minnesota United FC in their inaugural season in 2017. Seattle went on to win 2–1. Orlando's final home game of the season, played on October 21, saw them win only their second game under the stewardship of James O'Connor when Kljestan scored penalty in stoppage time to beat Columbus Crew 2–1.

==== Decision Day ====
On October 28, the final day of the regular season, Orlando traveled to a New York Red Bulls side who were one of two teams with the potential to win the Supporters' Shield. They started the day one point behind Atlanta United FC but their 1–0 win over Orlando combined with Atlanta's 4–1 defeat against Toronto FC meant they finished top of the standings and lifted the Shield for the third time. Orlando finished the season bottom of the Eastern Conference and, because of Colorado Rapids' decision day win, dropped to 22nd in the Supporters' Shield.

=== November ===
On November 26, 2018, Orlando City parted ways with general manager Niki Budalić who had been at the club since January 2016 and held the role of GM for two years. The day after, the club announced it had decided not to exercise the contract options of eight players: Joe Bendik, Richie Laryea, Tony Rocha, Chris Schuler, Jonathan Spector, Scott Sutter, Donny Toia and Jose Villarreal. Earl Edwards, Jr. would also be released as a result of his expired contract.

== Roster ==
As of August 3, 2018

| No. | Nationality | Name | Position(s) | Date of birth (age) | Previous club | Notes |
Goalkeepers
| 1 | (United States) | Joe Bendik | GK | April 25, 1989 (aged 28) | (Canada) Toronto FC | – |
| 31 | (United States) | Mason Stajduhar | GK | December 2, 1997 (aged 20) | (United States) Orlando City U-23 | HGP |
| 36 | (United States) | Earl Edwards, Jr. | GK | January 24, 1992 (aged 26) | (United States) UCLA Bruins | – |
| 99 | (United States) | Adam Grinwis | GK | April 21, 1992 (aged 25) | (United States) Saint Louis FC | – |
Defenders
| 2 | (United States) | Jonathan Spector (C) | CB | March 1, 1986 (aged 32) | (England) Birmingham City | – |
| 3 | (Egypt) | Amro Tarek | CB | May 17, 1992 (aged 25) | (Egypt) Wadi Degla | Loan in |
| 12 | (United States) | Shane O'Neill | CB | September 2, 1993 (aged 24) | (Netherlands) Excelsior | HGP |
| 13 | (Libya) | Mohamed El Monir | LB | April 8, 1992 (aged 25) | (Serbia) Partizan Belgrade | INT |
| 21 | (Switzerland) | Scott Sutter | RB | May 13, 1986 (aged 31) | (Switzerland) Young Boys | – |
| 22 | (Senegal) | Lamine Sané | CB | March 22, 1987 (aged 30) | (Germany) Werder Bremen | INT |
| 25 | (United States) | Donny Toia | LB | May 28, 1992 (aged 25) | (Canada) Montreal Impact | – |
| 27 | (United States) | R. J. Allen | RB | April 17, 1990 (aged 27) | (United States) New York City FC | – |
| 28 | (United States) | Chris Schuler | CB | September 6, 1987 (aged 30) | (United States) Real Salt Lake | – |
| 94 | (Brazil) | PC | LB | March 10, 1994 (aged 23) | (United States) Orlando City B | – |
Midfielders
| 4 | (Canada) | Will Johnson | CM | January 21, 1987 (aged 31) | (Canada) Toronto FC | – |
| 5 | (United States) | Dillon Powers | DM | February 14, 1991 (aged 27) | (United States) Colorado Rapids | – |
| 6 | (Canada) | Richie Laryea | AM | January 7, 1995 (aged 23) | (United States) Orlando City B | GA |
| 7 | (Colombia) | Cristian Higuita | CM | January 14, 1994 (aged 24) | (Colombia) Deportivo Cali | – |
| 8 | (United States) | Tony Rocha | CM | August 21, 1993 (aged 24) | (United States) Orlando City B | – |
| 10 | (Paraguay) | Josué Colmán | AM | July 25, 1998 (aged 19) | (Paraguay) Cerro Porteño | INT, DP |
| 15 | (United States) | Cam Lindley | DM | July 18, 1997 (aged 20) | (United States) North Carolina Tar Heels | HGP |
| 16 | (United States) | Sacha Kljestan | AM | September 9, 1985 (aged 32) | (United States) New York Red Bulls | DP |
| 20 | (Spain) | Uri Rosell | DM | July 7, 1992 (aged 25) | (Portugal) Sporting CP | – |
| 26 | (Peru) | Carlos Ascues | DM | June 19, 1992 (aged 25) | (Peru) Alianza Lima | Loan in |
Forwards
| 11 | (United States) | Pierre Da Silva | LW | July 28, 1998 (aged 19) | (United States) Orlando City B | – |
| 14 | (England) | Dom Dwyer | CF | July 30, 1990 (aged 27) | (United States) Sporting KC | DP |
| 17 | (United States) | Chris Mueller | RW | August 28, 1996 (aged 21) | (United States) Wisconsin Badgers | – |
| 19 | (Peru) | Yoshimar Yotún | LW | April 7, 1990 (aged 27) | (Sweden) Malmö FF | INT |
| 29 | (Brazil) | Stefano Pinho | CF | January 12, 1991 (aged 27) | (United States) Miami FC | – |
| 33 | (United States) | Jose Villarreal | CF | September 10, 1993 (aged 24) | (United States) LA Galaxy | HGP |

== Staff ==
Executive
| Majority owner and chairman | (Brazil) Flávio Augusto da Silva |
| Minor owner/life president | (England) Phil Rawlins |
| Owner | (England) John Bonner |
| Chief executive officer | (Brazil) Alex Leitão |
| General manager | (Canada) Niki Budalic |
Coaching staff
| Head coach | (Republic of Ireland) James O'Connor |
| Assistant coach | (United States) Daniel Byrd |
| Assistant coach | (England) Sean McAuley |
| Assistant coach/academy coordinator | (United States) Bobby Murphy |
| Goalkeeping coach | (Lesotho) Thabane Sutu |

== Competitions ==
=== Friendlies ===
The pre-season schedule was announced on January 16, 2018, outlining five closed-door pre-season friendlies over the course of February. Training camp began on Monday, January 22, for the first of three training sessions before the club traveled to Jacksonville for a 10-day pre-season training camp at Davis Park. The club then relocated back to its training facility at Sylvan Lake Park. A sixth pre-season friendly was played on February 25 against Nashville SC of the United Soccer League.

| February 3 | **Jacksonville Dolphins** | **1–4** | **Orlando City** | Jacksonville, Florida |
| 12:00 pm EST | Escobado | | Yotún (pen.); Johnson; Kljestan | Stadium: Southern Oak Stadium; Attendance: Closed-door scrimmage |

| February 10 | **Orlando City** | **4–1** | **Minnesota United FC** | Sanford, Florida |
| 10:00 am EST | Johnson; Mueller; Kljestan | | Finlay | Stadium: Sylvan Lake Park; Attendance: Closed-door scrimmage |

| February 14 | **Philadelphia Union** | **1–3** | **Orlando City** | Sanford, Florida |
| 10:00 am EST | Burke | Report | Yotún (pen.); Allen; Mueller | Stadium: Sylvan Lake Park; Attendance: Closed-door scrimmage |

| February 17 | **Orlando City** | **5–2** | **Real Salt Lake** | Sanford, Florida |
| 12:00 pm EST | Kljestan; Mueller (o.g.) Pinho | | Plata; Silva | Stadium: Sylvan Lake Park; Attendance: Closed-door scrimmage |

| February 24 | **Orlando City** | **2–3** | **Chicago Fire** | Orlando, Florida |
| 11:30 am EST | Yotún (pen.); Yotún (red card); Mueller | Report | Nikolić | Stadium: Orlando City Stadium; Attendance: Closed-door scrimmage |

| February 25 | **Orlando City** | – | **Nashville SC** | Orlando, Florida |
| | | | | Stadium: Orlando City Stadium; Attendance: Closed-door scrimmage |
Note: Closed to the media, no official scoreline released

=== Major League Soccer ===
All times in regular season on Eastern Daylight Time (UTC−04:00) except where otherwise noted.

The opening home match was announced on December 19, 2017, while the remaining MLS schedule was released on January 4, 2018. Outside of the club, there were several changes made throughout the league. The most significant change came via the addition of Los Angeles FC as the 23rd franchise in MLS and 12th member of the Western Conference. Orlando City SC played LAFC for the first time on July 7, 2018.

==== Results summary ====
| Overall | | | | | | | | Home | | | | | | Away | | | | | |
| Pld | W | D | L | GF | GA | GD | Pts | W | D | L | GF | GA | GD | W | D | L | GF | GA | GD |
|---|---|---|---|---|---|---|---|---|---|---|---|---|---|---|---|---|---|---|---|
| 34 | 8 | 4 | 22 | 43 | 74 | −31 | 28 | 6 | 4 | 7 | 28 | 30 | −2 | 2 | 0 | 15 | 15 | 44 | −29 |

Source: Match reports

| Round | 1 | 2 | 3 | 4 | 5 | 6 | 7 | 8 | 9 | 10 | 11 | 12 | 13 | 14 | 15 | 16 | 17 | 18 | 19 | 20 | 21 | 22 | 23 | 24 | 25 | 26 | 27 | 28 | 29 | 30 | 31 | 32 | 33 | 34 |
|---|---|---|---|---|---|---|---|---|---|---|---|---|---|---|---|---|---|---|---|---|---|---|---|---|---|---|---|---|---|---|---|---|---|---|
| Ground | H | H | A | H | H | A | H | A | H | H | A | H | A | A | A | H | A | A | H | A | H | A | H | A | H | H | A | A | H | A | A | H | H | A |
| Result | D | L | L | W | W | W | W | W | W | L | L | L | L | L | L | L | L | L | W | L | L | L | D | L | L | D | L | L | D | L | L | L | W | L |

Source: Match reports
A = Away; H = Home; W = Win; D = Draw; L = Loss

==== Results ====
| March 3 1 | **Orlando City** | **1–1** | **D.C. United** | Orlando, Florida |
| 7:30 pm | Bendik (penalty missed) PS/20'; Lindley (yellow card) 31'; PC (red card) 41'; Yotún (yellow card) 81'; Pinho 90+3' | Report | Asad 32'; Birnbaum (yellow card) 45+1'; Mattocks (yellow card) 45+6'; DeLeon (yellow card) 47' | Stadium: Orlando City Stadium; Attendance: 25,527; Referee: Fotis Bazakos |

| March 10 2 | **Orlando City** | **1–2** | **Minnesota United FC** | Orlando, Florida |
| 7:30 pm | Yotún 42' (pen.); Laryea (yellow card) 56' | Report | Finlay 12', 79'; Schüller (yellow card) 88'; Toye (yellow card) 90+4' | Stadium: Orlando City Stadium; Attendance: 24,038; Referee: Sorin Stoica |
Note: Former Head Coach Adrian Heath returns to Orlando

| March 17 3 | **New York City FC** | **2–0** | **Orlando City** | New York, New York |
| 3:30 p.m. | Wallace (yellow card) 28'; Ring (yellow card) 54'; Tajouri 62'; Moralez 74'; McNamara (yellow card) 83' | Report | Higuita (yellow card) 27'; Laryea (yellow card) 90' | Stadium: Yankee Stadium; Attendance: 18,584; Referee: Jose Carlos Rivero |
Note: Transfer MF Sascha Kljestan is eligible for team sheet; 2-game suspension from 2017 MLS Playoffs ends

| March 31 4 | **Orlando City** | **4–3** | **New York Red Bulls** | Orlando, Florida |
| 3:30 p.m. | Johnson 15'; Dwyer 26', 48'; Sane (yellow card) 54'; Colman 86'; Yotun (yellow card) 90+1' | Report | Volot 7'; Etienne 24'; Collin (yellow card) 38'; Kaku (yellow card) 54'; Long 82' | Stadium: Orlando City Stadium; Attendance: 23,913; Referee: Jair Marrufo |
Note: Sacha Kljestan, Carlos Rivas and Tommy Redding face their former teams for the first time following a trade involving all three in January

| April 8 5 | **Orlando City** | **3–2** | **Portland Timbers** | Orlando, Florida |
| 4:00 p.m. | El Monir (yellow card) 28'; Mueller 80'; Kljestan 82' (pen.); Dwyer 87', (yellow card) 90+3' | Report | Blanco (yellow card) 8'; Valeri 20' (pen.); Tuiloma 59'; Gleeson (yellow card) 77' | Stadium: Orlando City Stadium; Attendance: 23,601; Referee: Baldomero Toledo |

| April 13 6 | **Philadelphia Union** | **0–2** | **Orlando City** | Chester, Pennsylvania |
| 8:00 p.m. EDT | Real (yellow card) 67'; Rosenberry (yellow card) 81' | Report | Dwyer 38', (yellow card) 74'; Mueller 45'; Bendik (yellow card) 63'; El Monir (yellow card) 79' | Stadium: Talen Energy Stadium; Attendance: 16,032; Referee: Chris Penso |

| April 21 7 | **Orlando City** | **3–2** | **San Jose Earthquakes** | Orlando, Florida |
| 7:30 p.m. | Mueller 2'; Kljestan 35'; Yotún (yellow card) 65'; Dwyer 69' | Report | Jungwirth 78', 90'; Quintana (yellow card) 73' | Stadium: Orlando City Stadium; Attendance: 25,527; Referee: Ismail Elfath |
Note: Adidas Parley for the Oceans campaign; all 23 MLS teams wearing plastic recycled-material kits; Dom Dwyer's 100th career goal

| April 29 8 | **Colorado Rapids** | **1–2** | **Orlando City** | Commerce City, Colorado |
| 4:00 p.m. | Badji 26'; Boateng (yellow card) 60'; Wynne (yellow card) 67'; Castillo (yellow card) 68'; Martinez (yellow card) 72' | Report | Higuita 52'; Yotún 77' (pen.); Tarek (yellow card) 87' | Stadium: Dick's Sporting Goods Park; Attendance: 15,702; Referee: Jose Carlos Rivero |

| May 6 9 | **Orlando City** | **3–1** | **Real Salt Lake** | Orlando, Florida |
| 5:00 p.m. | Bendik (yellow card) 51'; El Monir (yellow card) 59'; Dwyer 60'; Sané 63'; Higuita (yellow card) 74'; Yotún 78' | Report | Baird 12' | Stadium: Orlando City Stadium; Attendance: 23,258; Referee: Robert Sibiga |

| May 13 10 | **Orlando City** | **1–2** | **Atlanta United FC** | Orlando, Florida |
| 6:00 p.m. | Meram 57'; Higuita (yellow card) 20'; Bendik (yellow card) 32'; Yotún (yellow card) 82'; Rosell (yellow card) 88'; Johnson (yellow card) 90+4' | Report | Martinez 10' (pen.); Barco 31'; Villalba (yellow card) 84' | Stadium: Orlando City Stadium; Attendance: 24,232; Referee: Alan Kelly |

| May 18 11 | **Toronto FC** | **2–1** | **Orlando City** | Toronto, Ontario, Canada |
| 8:00 p.m. | Chapman 63'; Telfer 87' | Report | Higuita 73'; Johnson (yellow card) 84' | Stadium: BMO Field; Attendance: 28,009; Referee: Allen Chapman |
Note: Joe Bendik becomes first Lions player to play 7,000 minutes

| May 26 12 | **Orlando City** | **1–2** | **Chicago Fire** | Orlando, Florida |
| 7:30 p.m. | Higuita 28'; El Monir (yellow card) 11'; Schuler (yellow card) 40'; Rosell (yellow card) 64'; Mueller (yellow card) 70'; Kljestan (yellow card) 90' | Report | Katai 13'; Gordon 82'; Ellis (yellow card) 45+1'; Adams (red card) 89'; Kappelhof (yellow card) 90+6' | Stadium: Orlando City Stadium; Attendance: 25,288; Referee: Nima Saghafi |

| June 2 13 | **New York City FC** | **3–0** | **Orlando City** | New York, New York |
| 7:30 p.m. | Tajouri 35', 79'; Moralez (yellow card) 77', (goal) 87' | Report | Rosell (yellow card) 78'; Johnson (yellow card) 86' | Stadium: Yankee Stadium; Attendance: 22,103; Referee: Hilario Grajeda |
Note: First of four road games (including one U.S. Open Cup match) in the span of 12 days

| June 9 14 | **Vancouver Whitecaps FC** | **5–2** | **Orlando City** | Vancouver, British Columbia, Canada |
| 10:00 p.m. | Shea (yellow card) 33'; Kamara 36'; Aja (yellow card) 70'; Davies 76'; Reyna 87'; Mezquida 90' | Report | Johnson (yellow card) 12'; El Monir (yellow card) 27' (yellow-red card) 58'; Higuita (yellow card) 45'; Allen (yellow card) 50'; Kljestan 64'; Dwyer 90+4' | Stadium: BC Place; Attendance: 22,120; Referee: José Carlos Rivero |

| June 13 15 | **Montreal Impact** | **3–0** | **Orlando City** | Montreal, Quebec, Canada |
| 7:30 p.m. | Piatti 5' (pen.), 90+2'; Tarek 55' (o.g.) | Report | Dwyer (yellow card) 17'; Higuita (yellow card) 19'; Rosell (yellow card) 49' | Stadium: Stade Saputo; Attendance: 15,621; Referee: Armando Villarreal |

| June 23 16 | **Orlando City** | **0–2** | **Montreal Impact** | Orlando, Florida |
| 7:30 p.m. | Kljestan (yellow card) 58' | Report | Sané 55' (o.g.); Piatti 84' | Stadium: Orlando City Stadium; Attendance: 23,498; Referee: Drew Fischer |

| June 30 17 | **Atlanta United FC** | **4–0** | **Orlando City** | Atlanta, Georgia |
| 7:00 p.m. | Martínez 3'; Almirón 55', 78'; Barco 57' | Report | Johnson (yellow card) 19' | Stadium: Mercedes-Benz Stadium; Attendance: 71,932; Referee: Armando Villarreal |
Note: Supporters' groups "Iron Lion Firm" & "The Ruckus" banned from next two matches in Atlanta due to "alleged" inappropriate behavior through 2019 season.

| July 7 18 | **Los Angeles FC** | **4–1** | **Orlando City** | Los Angeles, California |
| 4:30 p.m. | Diomande 28', 82'; Blessing 32'; Rossi 84'; Ciman (yellow card) 90+1' | Report | Kljestan 59'; Allen (yellow card) 61'; Rosell (yellow card) 81' | Stadium: Banc of California Stadium; Attendance: 22,000; Referee: Chris Penso |
Note: New expansion club for MLS in 2018. James O'Connor's first game in charge of Orlando.

| July 14 19 | **Orlando City** | **2–1** | **Toronto FC** | Orlando, Florida |
| 7:30 p.m. | Schuler (yellow card) 6', (goal) 34'; Dwyer 48' | Report | Chapman (yellow card) 55'; Bradley (yellow card) 67'; Zavaleta (yellow card) 55'; Hagglund 90+4' | Stadium: Orlando City Stadium; Attendance: 23,420; Referee: Allen Chapman |

| July 21 20 | **Columbus Crew** | **3–2** | **Orlando City** | Columbus, Ohio |
| 7:30 p.m. | Jonathan (yellow card) 26'; Zardes 51', 88'; Santos (yellow card) 84'; Trapp 90+2'; Williams (yellow card) 90+5' | Report | Kljestan 16', (yellow card) 43'; Schuler (yellow card) 26'; Pinho 58'; El-Munir (yellow card) 87'; Yotún (yellow card) 90+3' | Stadium: MAPFRE Stadium; Attendance: 14,052; Referee: Silviu Petrescu |

| July 26 21 | **Orlando City** | **0–2** | **New York City FC** | Orlando, Florida |
| 8:00 p.m. | Dwyer (yellow card) 44'; Higuita (yellow card) 62'; O'Neill (red card) 83' | Report | Morález 40'; Tinnerholm 45+1'; McNamara (yellow card) 58'; Johnson (yellow card) 87'; Ring (yellow card) 90+5' | Stadium: Orlando City Stadium; Attendance: 23,790; Referee: Robert Sibiga |

| July 29 22 | **LA Galaxy** | **4–3** | **Orlando City** | Carson, California |
| 9:30 p.m. | Ciani (yellow card) 8'; Giovani 39'; Ibrahimović 47', 67', 71', (yellow card) 72' | Report | Higuita 18'; Ciani 44' (o.g.); Rocha (yellow card) 48'; Dwyer 54' | Stadium: StubHub Center; Attendance: 24,941; Referee: Armando Villarreal |

| August 4 23 | **Orlando City** | **3–3** | **New England Revolution** | Orlando, Florida |
| 7:30 p.m. | PC (yellow card) 6'; Kljestan (yellow card) 39'; Dwyer 45', (yellow card) 90+4'; Tarek 71'; Sutter 90+3'; Yotún (red card) 90+8' | Report | Agudelo 7'; Penilla 18'; Bye (yellow card) 38'; Bunbury 76' | Stadium: Orlando City Stadium; Attendance: 23,879; Referee: Hilario Grajeda |

| August 12 24 | **D.C. United** | **3–2** | **Orlando City** | Washington, D.C. |
| 6:00 p.m. | Acosta 45+4', 64', 90+6', (yellow card) 90+6'; Birnbaum (yellow card) 49' | Report | Ousted 50' (o.g.); Higuita (red card) 55'; Dwyer 71'; Tarek (yellow card) 86' | Stadium: Audi Field; Attendance: 17,020; Referee: José Carlos Rivero |
Note: Orlando's first visit to newly opened Audi Field.

| August 24 25 | **Orlando City** | **1–2** | **Atlanta United FC** | Orlando, Florida |
| 8:00 p.m. | Sutter 39'; Johnson (yellow card) 60'; Rosell (yellow card) 86'; Spector (yellow card) 90+3' | Report | González Pirez 21'; Martínez 74', (yellow card) 75' | Stadium: Orlando City Stadium; Attendance: 25,058; Referee: Ismail Elfath |

| September 1 26 | **Orlando City** | **2–2** | **Philadelphia Union** | Orlando, Florida |
| 8:00 p.m. | Dwyer 9'; Sutter 90+1' | Report | Burke 32'; Picault 88'; Bedoya (yellow card) 89'; Jones (yellow card) 90+5' | Stadium: Orlando City Stadium; Attendance: 22,912; Referee: Chris Penso |

| September 8 27 | **Sporting Kansas City** | **1–0** | **Orlando City** | Kansas City, Kansas |
| 8:30 p.m. | Gutiérrez 53' | Report | Mueller (yellow card) 38'; Johnson (yellow card) 42' | Stadium: Children's Mercy Park; Attendance: 19,332; Referee: Alan Kelly |

| September 16 28 | **Chicago Fire** | **4–0** | **Orlando City** | Bridgeview, Illinois |
| 5:00 p.m. | Nikolic 3', 70'; Katai 28', (yellow card) 58' de Leeuw 56' | Report | | Stadium: Toyota Park; Attendance: 16,287; Referee: Allen Chapman |

| September 22 29 | **Orlando City** | **0–0** | **Houston Dynamo** | Orlando, Florida |
| 7:30 p.m. | Spector (yellow card) 24'; Ascues (yellow card) 73'; Dwyer (yellow card) 90+1'; Yotun (yellow card) 90+4' | Report | Wenger (yellow card) 33' | Stadium: Orlando City Stadium; Attendance: 23,723; Referee: Baldomero Toledo |

| October 6 30 | **FC Dallas** | **2–0** | **Orlando City** | Frisco, Texas |
| 8:00 p.m. | Cannon (yellow card) 27'; Gruezo (yellow card) 28'; Mosquera 63'; Ulloa 69' | Report | Dwyer (yellow card) 7'; Yotún (yellow card) 35' | Stadium: Toyota Stadium; Attendance: 16,519; Referee: Nima Saghafi |

| October 13 31 | **New England Revolution** | **2–0** | **Orlando City** | Foxboro, Massachusetts |
| 7:30 p.m. | Penilla 51'; Fagundez 55' | Report | | Stadium: Gillette Stadium; Attendance: 19,775; Referee: Dave Gantar |

| October 17 32 | **Orlando City** | **1–2** | **Seattle Sounders FC** | Orlando, Florida |
| 7:30 p.m. | Dwyer 57'; Ascues (yellow card) 90+2' | Report | Rodríguez 3'; Bwana 13'; Delem (yellow card) 78'; A. Roldan (yellow card) 90+5' | Stadium: Orlando City Stadium; Attendance: 22,344; Referee: Mark Geiger |

| October 21 33 | **Orlando City** | **2–1** | **Columbus Crew** | Orlando, Florida |
| | Dwyer (yellow card) 37'; Yotún 57' (pen.); Kljestan 90+6' (pen.) | Report | Mensah (yellow card) 33'; Higuaín 54' | Stadium: Orlando City Stadium; Attendance: 23,642; Referee: Kevin Stott |

| October 28 34 | **New York Red Bulls** | **1–0** | **Orlando City** | Harrison, New Jersey |
| 4:30 p.m. | Etienne 53'; Muyl (yellow card) 74' | Report | Dwyer (yellow card) 45' | Stadium: Red Bull Arena; Attendance: 20,023; Referee: Ismail Elfath |
Note: Decision Day 2018; all matches start at 4:30 pm. EST

=== Standings ===
==== Eastern Conference table ====
| Pos | Team | Pld | W | L | T | GF | GA | GD | Pts |
|---|---|---|---|---|---|---|---|---|---|
| 7 | Montreal Impact | 34 | 14 | 16 | 4 | 47 | 53 | −6 | **46** |
| 8 | New England Revolution | 34 | 10 | 13 | 11 | 49 | 55 | −6 | **41** |
| 9 | Toronto FC | 34 | 10 | 18 | 6 | 59 | 64 | −5 | **36** |
| 10 | Chicago Fire | 34 | 8 | 18 | 8 | 48 | 61 | −13 | **32** |
| **11** | Orlando City SC | **34** | **8** | **22** | **4** | **43** | **74** | **−31** | **28** |

Source: MLS

==== Overall table ====
| Pos | Team | Pld | W | L | T | GF | GA | GD | Pts | Qualification |
|---|---|---|---|---|---|---|---|---|---|---|
| 19 | Toronto FC (V) | 34 | 10 | 18 | 6 | 59 | 64 | −5 | **36** | Qualification for the CONCACAF Champions League |
| 20 | Chicago Fire | 34 | 8 | 18 | 8 | 48 | 61 | −13 | **32** | |
| 21 | Colorado Rapids | 34 | 8 | 19 | 7 | 36 | 63 | −27 | **31** | |
| **22** | Orlando City SC | **34** | **8** | **22** | **4** | **43** | **74** | **−31** | **28** | |
| 23 | San Jose Earthquakes | 34 | 4 | 21 | 9 | 49 | 71 | −22 | **21** | |

Source: MLS
Rules for classification: 1) points; 2) total wins; 3) total goal differential; 4) total goals scored; 5) disciplinary points; 6) away goals scored; 7) away goal differential; 8) coin toss or drawing of lots
(V) Canadian Championship winners

=== U.S. Open Cup ===
After the fourth round draw was held on May 24, Orlando City entered the 105th edition of the U.S. Open Cup on the road in South Florida, against Miami FC on June 6.

Bracket

Fourth round June 5–6
**MLS** | **Houston Dynamo** | **5**
LQ | NTX Rayados | 0
USL | FC Cincinnati | 0(1)
**MLS** | **Minnesota United FC** | **0(3)**
MLS | Real Salt Lake | 0
**MLS** | **Sporting Kansas City** | **2**
USL | San Antonio FC | 0
**MLS** | **FC Dallas** | **1**
**MLS** | **Los Angeles FC** | **2**
USL | Fresno FC | 0
**USL** | **Sacramento Republic FC** | **2***
MLS | Seattle Sounders FC | 1
**MLS** | **Portland Timbers** | **2**
MLS | San Jose Earthquakes | 0
**MLS** | **LA Galaxy** | **3**
PDL | FC Golden State Force | 1
**MLS** | **Philadelphia Union** | **5**
USL | Richmond Kickers | 0
**MLS** | **New York Red Bulls** | **4**
MLS | New York City FC | 0
**MLS** | **D.C. United** | **1(4)**
USL | North Carolina FC | 1(3)
NPSL | Miami United FC | 0
**MLS** | **Orlando City SC** | **3**
**MLS** | **Atlanta United FC** | **3**
USL | Charleston Battery | 0
MLS | Columbus Crew SC | 2(9)
**MLS** | **Chicago Fire** | **2(10)**
**USL** | **Louisville City FC** | **3**
MLS | New England Revolution | 2
**USL** | **Nashville SC** | **2**
MLS | Colorado Rapids | 0

Round of 16; June 15–20
**MLS** | **Houston Dynamo** | **1**
MLS | Minnesota United FC | 0
**MLS** | **Sporting Kansas City** | **3**
MLS | FC Dallas | 2
**MLS** | **Los Angeles FC** | **3**
USL | Sacramento Republic FC | 2
**MLS** | **Portland Timbers** | **1**
MLS | LA Galaxy | 0
**MLS** | **Philadelphia Union** | **2**
MLS | New York Red Bulls | 1
MLS | D.C. United | 1(2)
**MLS** | **Orlando City SC** | **1(4)**
MLS | Atlanta United FC | 0
**MLS** | **Chicago Fire** | **1**
**USL** | **Louisville City FC** | **2**
USL | Nashville SC | 1

Quarterfinals; July 18
**MLS** | **Houston Dynamo** | **4**
MLS | Sporting Kansas City | 2
**MLS** | **Los Angeles FC** | **3**
MLS | Portland Timbers | 2
**MLS** | **Philadelphia Union** | **1**
MLS | Orlando City SC | 0
**MLS** | **Chicago Fire** | **4**
USL | Louisville City FC | 0

Semifinals; August 8
**MLS** | **Houston Dynamo** | **3(7)**
MLS | Los Angeles FC | 3(6)
**MLS** | **Philadelphia Union** | **3**
MLS | Chicago Fire | 0

Final; September 26
**MLS** | **Houston Dynamo** | **3**
MLS | Philadelphia Union | 0

- Host team listed first
- **Bold** = winner
- * = after extra time, ( ) = penalty shootout score

| June 6 Fourth round | **Miami United FC (Florida)** | **0–3** | **(Florida) Orlando City** | Hialeah, Florida |
| 7:00 pm EDT | Shamar (yellow card) 45'; Schenfeld (yellow card) 51'; Tejera (yellow card) 68'; Domingues (yellow card) 70' | Report | El Monir (yellow card) 33'; Pinho 37'; Powers 53'; PC 62', (yellow card) 73' | Stadium: Ted Hendricks Stadium; Attendance: 2,721; Referee: Elvis Osmanovic |

| June 20 Round of 16 | **D.C. United (Washington, D.C.)** | **1–1** (a.e.t.) (**2–4** p) | **(Florida) Orlando City** | Germantown, Maryland |
| 7:00 pm EDT | Acosta 10'; Fisher (yellow card) 24'; Durkin (yellow card) 52' (yellow-red card) 99' | Report | Meram 17'; El-Munir (yellow card) 116'; Mueller (yellow card) 117' | Stadium: Maryland SoccerPlex; Attendance: 3,254; Referee: Marcos de Oliveira |
| | **Penalties** |
| | Asad (penalty missed); Acosta (penalty missed); Harkes (penalty scored); Mullins (penalty scored) | | (penalty scored) Johnson; (penalty scored) Kljestan; (penalty scored) Mueller; (penalty missed) Villarreal; (penalty scored) Colmán |

| July 18 Quarterfinals | **Philadelphia Union (Pennsylvania)** | **1–0** | **(Florida) Orlando City** | Chester, Pennsylvania |
| 7:00 pm EDT | Bedoya 4' | Report | Toia (yellow card) 85'; Johnson (yellow card) 17' | Stadium: Talen Energy Stadium; Attendance: 7,176; Referee: Rubiel Vazquez |

== Squad statistics ==
=== Appearances ===
As of match played October 28, 2018

Starting appearances are listed first, followed by substitute appearances after the + symbol where applicable.

| No. | Pos | Nat | Player | Total | | MLS | | Open Cup | |
| No. | Pos | Nat | Player | Apps | Goals | Apps | Goals | Apps | Goals |
Goalkeepers
| 1 | GK | (United States) USA | Joe Bendik | 25 | 0 | 24+1 | 0 | 0 | 0 |
| 31 | GK | (United States) USA | Mason Stajduhar | 0 | 0 | 0 | 0 | 0 | 0 |
| 36 | GK | (United States) USA | Earl Edwards Jr. | 8 | 0 | 5 | 0 | 3 | 0 |
| 99 | GK | (United States) USA | Adam Grinwis | 5 | 0 | 5 | 0 | 0 | 0 |
Defenders
| 2 | DF | (United States) USA | Jonathan Spector | 15 | 0 | 13 | 0 | 2 | 0 |
| 3 | DF | (Egypt) EGY | Amro Tarek | 22 | 1 | 19+1 | 1 | 2 | 0 |
| 12 | DF | (United States) USA | Shane O'Neill | 14 | 0 | 13 | 0 | 1 | 0 |
| 13 | DF | (Libya) LBA | Mohamed El Monir | 29 | 0 | 22+4 | 0 | 3 | 0 |
| 21 | DF | (Switzerland) SUI | Scott Sutter | 19 | 3 | 18+1 | 3 | 0 | 0 |
| 22 | DF | (Senegal) SEN | Lamine Sané | 17 | 1 | 15+1 | 1 | 1 | 0 |
| 25 | DF | (United States) USA | Donny Toia | 5 | 0 | 3+1 | 0 | 1 | 0 |
| 27 | DF | (United States) USA | R. J. Allen | 20 | 0 | 10+8 | 0 | 2 | 0 |
| 28 | DF | (United States) USA | Chris Schuler | 10 | 1 | 8+1 | 1 | 0+1 | 0 |
| 94 | DF | (Brazil) BRA | PC | 9 | 1 | 5+3 | 1 | 1 | 0 |
Midfielders
| 4 | MF | (Canada) CAN | Will Johnson | 32 | 1 | 26+3 | 1 | 1+2 | 0 |
| 5 | MF | (United States) USA | Dillon Powers | 5 | 1 | 0+3 | 0 | 1+1 | 1 |
| 6 | MF | (Canada) CAN | Richie Laryea | 9 | 0 | 2+7 | 0 | 0 | 0 |
| 7 | MF | (Colombia) COL | Cristian Higuita | 22 | 4 | 18+3 | 4 | 1 | 0 |
| 8 | MF | (United States) USA | Tony Rocha | 13 | 0 | 9+3 | 0 | 1 | 0 |
| 10 | MF | (Paraguay) PAR | Josué Colmán | 27 | 1 | 10+14 | 1 | 2+1 | 0 |
| 15 | MF | (United States) USA | Cam Lindley | 4 | 0 | 3 | 0 | 0+1 | 0 |
| 16 | MF | (United States) USA | Sacha Kljestan | 33 | 6 | 29+1 | 6 | 3 | 0 |
| 20 | MF | (Spain) ESP | Uri Rosell | 24 | 0 | 18+4 | 0 | 2 | 0 |
| 26 | MF | (Peru) PER | Carlos Ascues | 9 | 0 | 9 | 0 | 0 | 0 |
Forwards
| 11 | FW | (United States) USA | Pierre Da Silva | 2 | 0 | 0+2 | 0 | 0 | 0 |
| 14 | FW | (United States) USA | Dom Dwyer | 27 | 13 | 25+1 | 13 | 1 | 0 |
| 17 | FW | (United States) USA | Chris Mueller | 34 | 3 | 23+9 | 3 | 2 | 0 |
| 19 | FW | (Peru) PER | Yoshimar Yotún | 22 | 4 | 22 | 4 | 0 | 0 |
| 29 | FW | (Brazil) BRA | Stefano Pinho | 26 | 3 | 5+18 | 2 | 2+1 | 1 |
| 33 | FW | (United States) USA | Jose Villarreal | 5 | 0 | 0+3 | 0 | 0+2 | 0 |
Players who appeared for the club but left during the season:
| 9 | FW | (Iraq) IRQ | Justin Meram | 18 | 2 | 14+3 | 1 | 1 | 1 |

=== Goalscorers ===
As of match played October 28, 2018

| Rank | No. | Pos. | Name | MLS | Open Cup | Total |
|---|---|---|---|---|---|---|
| 1 | FW | 14 | (United States) Dom Dwyer | 13 | 0 | 13 |
| 2 | MF | 16 | (United States) Sacha Kljestan | 6 | 0 | 6 |
| 3 | MF | 7 | (Colombia) Cristian Higuita | 4 | 0 | 4 |
| 3 | MF | 19 | (Peru) Yoshimar Yotún | 4 | 0 | 4 |
| 5 | FW | 17 | (United States) Chris Mueller | 3 | 0 | 3 |
| 5 | RB | 21 | (Switzerland) Scott Sutter | 3 | 0 | 3 |
| 5 | FW | 29 | (Brazil) Stefano Pinho | 2 | 1 | 3 |
| 8 | MF | 9 | (Iraq) Justin Meram | 1 | 1 | 2 |
| 9 | MF | 4 | (Canada) Will Johnson | 1 | 0 | 1 |
| 9 | MF | 10 | (Paraguay) Josué Colmán | 1 | 0 | 1 |
| 9 | CB | 22 | (Senegal) Lamine Sané | 1 | 0 | 1 |
| 9 | CB | 28 | (United States) Chris Schuler | 1 | 0 | 1 |
| 9 | CB | 3 | (Egypt) Amro Tarek | 1 | 0 | 1 |
| 9 | MF | 5 | (United States) Dillon Powers | 0 | 1 | 1 |
| 9 | LB | 94 | (Brazil) PC | 0 | 1 | 1 |
| Own Goals | | | | 2 | 0 | 2 |
| Total | | | | 43 | 4 | 47 |

=== Shutouts ===
As of match played October 28, 2018

| Rank | No. | Name | MLS | Open Cup | Total |
|---|---|---|---|---|---|
| 1 | 1 | (United States) Joe Bendik | 1 | 0 | 1 |
| 1 | 99 | (United States) Adam Grinwis | 1 | 0 | 1 |
| 1 | 36 | (United States) Earl Edwards Jr. | 0 | 1 | 1 |
| Total | | | 2 | 1 | 3 |

=== Disciplinary record ===
As of match played October 28, 2018

| No. | Pos. | Name | MLS | | | Open Cup | | | Total | | |
| No. | Pos. | Name | Yellow card | (yellow card) (yellow-red card) | Red card | Yellow card | (yellow card) (yellow-red card) | Red card | Yellow card | (yellow card) (yellow-red card) | Red card |
|---|---|---|---|---|---|---|---|---|---|---|---|
| 1 | GK | (United States) Joe Bendik | 3 | 0 | 0 | 0 | 0 | 0 | 3 | 0 | 0 |
| 2 | DF | (United States) Jonathan Spector | 2 | 0 | 0 | 0 | 0 | 0 | 2 | 0 | 0 |
| 3 | DF | (Egypt) Amro Tarek | 2 | 0 | 0 | 0 | 0 | 0 | 2 | 0 | 0 |
| 4 | MF | (Canada) Will Johnson | 7 | 0 | 0 | 1 | 0 | 0 | 8 | 0 | 0 |
| 6 | MF | (Canada) Richie Laryea | 2 | 0 | 0 | 0 | 0 | 0 | 2 | 0 | 0 |
| 7 | MF | (Colombia) Cristian Higuita | 6 | 0 | 1 | 0 | 0 | 0 | 6 | 0 | 1 |
| 8 | MF | (United States) Tony Rocha | 1 | 0 | 0 | 0 | 0 | 0 | 1 | 0 | 0 |
| 12 | DF | (United States) Shane O’Neill | 0 | 0 | 1 | 0 | 0 | 0 | 0 | 0 | 1 |
| 13 | DF | (Libya) Mohamed El Monir | 6 | 1 | 0 | 2 | 0 | 0 | 8 | 1 | 0 |
| 14 | FW | (United States) Dom Dwyer | 9 | 0 | 0 | 0 | 0 | 0 | 9 | 0 | 0 |
| 15 | MF | (United States) Cam Lindley | 1 | 0 | 0 | 0 | 0 | 0 | 1 | 0 | 0 |
| 16 | MF | (United States) Sacha Kljestan | 4 | 0 | 0 | 0 | 0 | 0 | 4 | 0 | 0 |
| 17 | FW | (United States) Chris Mueller | 2 | 0 | 0 | 1 | 0 | 0 | 3 | 0 | 0 |
| 19 | FW | (Peru) Yoshimar Yotún | 8 | 0 | 1 | 0 | 0 | 0 | 8 | 0 | 1 |
| 20 | MF | (Spain) Uri Rosell | 6 | 0 | 0 | 0 | 0 | 0 | 6 | 0 | 0 |
| 22 | DF | (Senegal) Lamine Sané | 1 | 0 | 0 | 0 | 0 | 0 | 1 | 0 | 0 |
| 25 | DF | (United States) Donny Toia | 0 | 0 | 0 | 1 | 0 | 0 | 1 | 0 | 0 |
| 26 | MF | (Peru) Carlos Ascues | 2 | 0 | 0 | 0 | 0 | 0 | 2 | 0 | 0 |
| 27 | DF | (United States) R. J. Allen | 2 | 0 | 0 | 0 | 0 | 0 | 2 | 0 | 0 |
| 28 | DF | (United States) Chris Schuler | 3 | 0 | 0 | 0 | 0 | 0 | 3 | 0 | 0 |
| 94 | DF | (Brazil) PC | 1 | 0 | 1 | 1 | 0 | 0 | 2 | 0 | 1 |
| Total | | | 68 | 1 | 4 | 6 | 0 | 0 | 74 | 1 | 4 |

== Player movement ==
Per Major League Soccer and club policies, terms of the deals do not get disclosed.

=== MLS SuperDraft picks ===
Draft picks are not automatically signed to the team roster. The 2018 draft was held on January 19, 2018. Orlando had one selection.

2018 Orlando City MLS SuperDraft Picks
| Round | Selection | Player | Position | College | Status |
|---|---|---|---|---|---|
| 1 | 6 | (United States) Chris Mueller | RW | University of Wisconsin | Signed |

=== Transfers in ===
| No. | Name | Pos. | Transferred from | Fee/notes | Date | Ref. |
|---|---|---|---|---|---|---|
| 27 | (United States) R. J. Allen | RB | (United States) New York City FC | Acquired for a 2018 MLS SuperDraft third-round pick | December 18, 2017 | |
| 29 | (Brazil) Stefano Pinho | CF | (United States) Miami FC | Free transfer | December 18, 2017 | |
| 33 | (United States) Jose Villarreal | CF | (United States) LA Galaxy | Acquired for a 2019 MLS SuperDraft third-round pick | December 27, 2017 | |
| 13 | (Libya) Mohamed El Monir | LB | (Serbia) Partizan Belgrade | Free transfer | December 27, 2017 | |
| 16 | (United States) Sacha Kljestan | AM | (United States) New York Red Bulls | Acquired for Targeted Allocation Money, Carlos Rivas and Tommy Redding | January 3, 2018 | |
| 99 | (United States) Adam Grinwis | GK | (United States) Saint Louis FC | Free transfer | January 5, 2018 | |
| 10 | (Paraguay) Josué Colmán | AM | (Paraguay) Cerro Porteño | Undisclosed fee, reportedly $3 million | January 15, 2018 | |
| 15 | (United States) Cam Lindley | DM | (United States) Chicago Fire | Homegrown Player Rights; Exchange for Rafael Ramos and Targeted Allocation Money | January 18, 2018 | |
| 9 | (Iraq) Justin Meram | LW | (United States) Columbus Crew | Acquired for $750k TAM, $300k GAM and a 2019 international roster slot | January 29, 2018 | |
| 20 | (Spain) Uri Rosell | DM | (Portugal) Sporting CP | Acquired No. 1 position in MLS Allocation Ranking Order from FC Dallas in exchange for Targeted Allocation Money | January 30, 2018 | |
| 22 | (Senegal) Lamine Sané | CB | (Germany) Werder Bremen | Free transfer | February 20, 2018 | |
| 28 | (United States) Chris Schuler | CB | (United States) Real Salt Lake | Free transfer | March 2, 2018 | |
| 12 | (United States) Shane O’Neill | CB | (Netherlands) Excelsior | Free transfer | June 22, 2018 | |

=== Loans in ===
| No. | Name | Pos. | Loaned from | Notes | Date | Ref. |
|---|---|---|---|---|---|---|
| 3 | (Egypt) Amro Tarek | CB | (Egypt) Wadi Degla | One-year loan with a club option to buy | February 2, 2018 | |
| 26 | (Peru) Carlos Ascues | DM | (Peru) Alianza Lima | Until end of season with 12-month extension option | August 16, 2018 | |

=== Transfers out ===
| No. | Name | Pos. | Transferred to | Fee/notes | Date | Ref. |
|---|---|---|---|---|---|---|
| 28 | (Puerto Rico) Josh Saunders | GK | Retired | Option declined | November 7, 2017 | |
| 3 | (England) Seb Hines | CB | Retired | Option declined | November 7, 2017 | |
| 22 | (United States) Conor Donovan | CB | (United States) Rio Grande Valley FC | Option declined; Signed with Rio Grande Valley on 1/18/18 | November 7, 2017 | |
| 23 | (Italy) Antonio Nocerino | CM | (Italy) Benevento | Option declined; Signed with Benevento on 6/7/18 | November 7, 2017 | |
| 5 | (United States) Servando Carrasco | DM | (United States) LA Galaxy | Option declined; Selected by LA Galaxy in 2017 MLS Re-Entry Draft | November 7, 2017 | |
| 14 | (Jamaica) Giles Barnes | CF | (Mexico) León | Option declined; Signed with León on 1/9/18 | November 7, 2017 | |
| 13 | (Guinea) Hadji Barry | CF | (United States) Swope Park Rangers | Option declined; Signed with Swope Park Rangers on 1/15/18 | November 7, 2017 | |
| 12 | (United States) Kevin Alston | LB | (United States) Orange County SC | Contract expired; Signed with Orange County on 6/8/18 | November 7, 2017 | |
| 16 | (Honduras) Devron García | DM | (Honduras) Real España | Contract expired | November 7, 2017 | |
| 10 | (Brazil) Kaká | AM | Retired | Contract expired; announced retirement on 12/17/17 | November 7, 2017 | |
| 11 | (Colombia) Carlos Rivas | LW | (United States) New York Red Bulls | Traded for Sacha Kljestan | January 3, 2018 | |
| 29 | (United States) Tommy Redding | CB | (United States) New York Red Bulls | Traded for Sacha Kljestan | January 3, 2018 | |
| 27 | (Portugal) Rafael Ramos | RB | (United States) Chicago Fire | Traded in exchange for Cam Lindley, GAM and TAM | January 18, 2018 | |
| 9 | (Canada) Cyle Larin | CF | (Turkey) Beşiktaş | Undisclosed fee, reportedly $2.3 million | January 30, 2018 | |
| 18 | (Uruguay) José Aja | CB | (Canada) Vancouver Whitecaps FC | Traded in exchange for TAM | February 24, 2018 | |
| 9 | (Iraq) Justin Meram | LW | (United States) Columbus Crew | Traded for $750k TAM and a 2019 international roster slot | August 3, 2018 | |

=== Loans out ===
| No. | Name | Pos. | Loaned to | Notes | Date | Ref. |
|---|---|---|---|---|---|---|
| 8 | (United States) Tony Rocha | CM | (United States) Saint Louis FC | Two matches, from April 6 until April 15, 2018 | April 6, 2018 | |
| 11 | (United States) Pierre Da Silva | LW | (United States) Saint Louis FC | One Match vs. Colorado Springs Switchbacks FC on Saturday, May 26 | May 24, 2018 | |
| 15 | (United States) Cam Lindley | DM | (United States) Saint Louis FC | One Match vs. Colorado Springs Switchbacks FC on Saturday, May 26 | May 24, 2018 | |
| 11 | (United States) Pierre Da Silva | LW | (United States) Saint Louis FC | Second loan to Saint Louis FC, ended August 6 | July 18, 2018 | |

== Broadcasting ==
Orlando City were featured on national television 13 times during the 2018 season, while all remaining matches were televised locally on WRDQ. Six of the nationally televised games were shown on ESPN, tied with three other clubs for the most appearances. Additionally, certain matches were streamed live on Twitter following the announcement of a three-year agreement between Major League Soccer and the social networking service. In May 2018, the club announced a deal it had made with YouTube TV in which all of its locally televised matches would be streamed live through the subscription service.

English-language radio was split between WTKS 104.1 and WYGM 740 AM/96.9 FM/101.1-2 HD for the 2018 season, with WYGM airing 18 regular-season matches and WTKS airing 14 regular-season matches. Spanish-language radio broadcasts were conducted on WDYZ 990 AM.
