= 2013 Toronto FC season =

Toronto FC 2013 soccer season

Toronto FC
2013 season
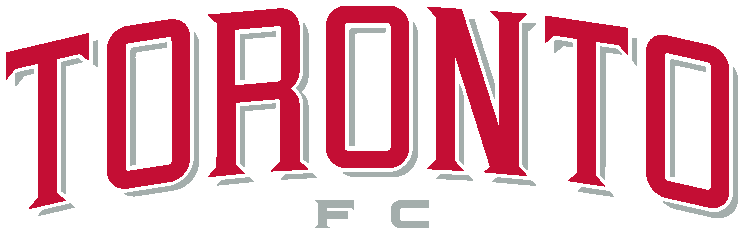
- President / general manager: Kevin Payne
- Head coach: Ryan Nelsen
- Stadium: BMO Field
- Major League Soccer: Conference: 9th Overall: 17th
- MLS Cup playoffs: Did not qualify
- Canadian Championship: Semi-finals
- Top goalscorer: League: Robert Earnshaw (8); All: Robert Earnshaw (8)
- Average home league attendance: 19,036
Home colours	Away colours

The 2013 Toronto FC season was Toronto FC's seventh season in Major League Soccer, the top tier of soccer in the United States and Canada. Kevin Payne became the club's first president during the off-season. He also became the club's general manager. The season began on March 2.

The club entered the season as the defending Canadian Championship winners.

== Review and events ==
Kevin Payne became the club president and general manager during the off-season. The club fired Paul Mariner as head coach and was replaced by Ryan Nelsen, who was at the time an active player with Queens Park Rangers F.C. in England. Kevin Payne stated, in reference to Nelson's availability, that "We're not sure when he'll join us." Nelson terminated his QPR contract before the end of the season, and joined TFC in February 2013.

The season opened with an away game on March 2 against Vancouver Whitecaps FC and the following week played their only MLS match away from BMO Field, the home opener against Sporting Kansas City on March 9, 2013, with a then-record Toronto FC home MLS attendance of 25,991. The season finished with a home win against Montreal Impact on October 26.

== Fixtures and results ==
=== Legend ===
Win Draw Loss

=== Pre-season ===
Feb 9 Disney Pro Soccer Classic	Columbus Crew	1–0	Toronto FC	ESPN Wide World of Sports Complex
	Gláuber 30'	Report

Feb 13 Disney Pro Soccer Classic	Toronto FC	3–0	Orlando City SC	ESPN Wide World of Sports Complex
	Taylor Morgan 53'; Terry Dunfield 72'; Jonathan Osorio 87'	Report

Feb 16 Disney Pro Soccer Classic	Toronto FC	0–3	Philadelphia Union	ESPN Wide World of Sports Complex
		Report	Antoine Hoppenot 8'; Róger Torres 40'; Matt Kassel 51'

Feb 23 Disney Pro Soccer Classic	Sporting Kansas City	1–0	Toronto FC	ESPN Wide World of Sports Complex
	Claudio Bieler 23'; Oriol Rosell (yellow card) 48'	Report	Darren O'Dea (yellow card) 15'; Justin Davis (yellow card) 35'; Darren O'Dea (yellow card) 57' (red card)

=== MLS regular season ===
==== Match results ====
Mar 2 1	Vancouver Whitecaps FC	1–0	Toronto FC	BC Place
	Koffie 59'	report	Dunfield (yellow card) 27'	Attendance: 21,000; Referee: Juan Guzman

Mar 9 2	Toronto FC	2–1	Sporting Kansas City	Rogers Centre
	Earnshaw 2', 21' (pen.) (yellow card) 86'; Califf (yellow card) 77'; O'Dea (yellow card) 90+5'	report	Nagamura (yellow card) 24'; Collin (yellow card) 39'; Sinovic (yellow card) 75'; Bieler 77'; Feilhaber (yellow card) 78'	Attendance: 25,991; Referee: Fotis Bazakos

Mar 16 3	Montreal Impact	2–1	Toronto FC	Olympic Stadium
	Bernier 34' (pen.) (yellow card) 64'; Di Vaio 46+'; Iapichino (yellow card) 67'	report	Hall (yellow card) 21'; Earnshaw 68' (pen.); Eckersley (yellow card) 92+'	Attendance: 37,896; Referee: Baldomero Toledo

Mar 30 4	Toronto FC	2–2	LA Galaxy	BMO Field
	Earnshaw 29'; Califf (yellow card) 51'; Osorio 79'		Magee 16'; Sarvas (yellow card) 76'; Villarreal 92+'	Attendance: 18,355; Referee: Hilario Grajeda

Apr 6 5	Toronto FC	2–2	FC Dallas	BMO Field
	Russell 90' (yellow card) 14'; Ephraim (yellow card) 46'; Silva (yellow card) 58'; Braun 85' (yellow card) 94'	Stats	Jacobson 34' (yellow card) 86'; Pérez 59'; Castillo (yellow card) 84'	Attendance: 16,111; Referee: Ismail Elfath

Apr 13 6	Philadelphia Union	1–1	Toronto FC	PPL Park
	McInerney 93'; Cruz (yellow card) 36'; Daniel (yellow card) 83'; Casey (yellow card) 92'	Stats	Earnshaw 71'; Agbossoumonde (yellow card) 68'; O'Dea (yellow card) 74'; Ephraim (yellow card) 74'; Bendik (yellow card) 80'; Morgan (yellow card) 21' (yellow-red card) 88'	Attendance: 17,182; Referee: Sorin Stoica

Apr 20 7	Toronto FC	1–1	Houston Dynamo	BMO Field
	Hall 58'		Creavalle 94'	Attendance: 15,973; Referee: Drew Fischer

Apr 27 8	Toronto FC	1–2	New York Red Bulls	BMO Field
	Osorio 83'		Cahill 39', 89'	Attendance: 20,009; Referee: Jorge Gonzalez

May 4 9	Colorado Rapids	1–0	Toronto FC	Dick's Sporting Goods Park
	Buddle 86'	Stats		Attendance: 12,658; Referee: Matthew Foerster

May 8 10	San Jose Earthquakes	2–1	Toronto FC	Buck Shaw Stadium
	Jahn 46'; Wondolowski 81'	Stats	Braun 14'	Attendance: 10,048; Referee: Fotis Bazakos

May 18 11	Toronto FC	0–1	Columbus Crew	BMO Field
			Oduro 42'	Attendance: 18,278

May 25 12	New England Revolution	2–0	Toronto FC	Gillette Stadium
	Fagúndez 23'; Agudelo 93+'	Stats		Attendance: 10,711

Jun 1 13	Toronto FC	1–1	Philadelphia Union	BMO Field
	Osorio 66'	report	McInerney 91+'	Attendance: 19,221; Referee: Geoff Gamble

Jun 15 14	D.C. United	1–2	Toronto FC	RFK Stadium
	De Rosario 19' (pen.)	Stats	Earnshaw 30'; Woolard 41' (o.g.)	Attendance: 13,846

Jun 22 15	Houston Dynamo	0–0	Toronto FC	BBVA Compass Stadium
		Stats		Attendance: 22,039

Jun 29 16	Toronto FC	0–1	Real Salt Lake	BMO Field
		Stats	Álvarez 45'	Attendance: 20,841

Jul 3 17	Toronto FC	3–3	Montreal Impact	BMO Field
	Brockie 6'; Caldwell 21'; O'Dea 24'	Stats	Romero 1'; Camara 69'; Di Vaio 70'	Attendance: 21,700

Jul 13 18	Sporting Kansas City	3–0	Toronto FC	Sporting Park
	Saad 21', 51'; Bieler 63'	Stats		Attendance: 21,126

Jul 17 19	Chivas USA	1–0	Toronto FC	Home Depot Center
	Torres 79'	Stats		Attendance: 7851

Jul 20 20	Toronto FC	0–0	New York Red Bulls	BMO Field
		Stats		Attendance: 19,444

Jul 27 21	Toronto FC	2–1	Columbus Crew	BMO Field
	Osorio 87'; Wiedeman 90+4'	Stats	Oduro 17'	Attendance: 17,987

Aug 4 22	New England Revolution	0-1	Toronto FC	Gillette Stadium
		report	Laba 2'	Attendance: 11,543; Referee: Ricardo Salazar

Aug 10 23	Toronto FC	1–2	Seattle Sounders FC	BMO Field
	Osorio 46'	report	Rosales 16'; Johnson (yellow card) 23'; Henry 40' (o.g.); Joseph (yellow card) 75'	Attendance: 18,766; Referee: Mark Geiger

Aug 17 24	Columbus Crew	2-0	Toronto FC	Columbus Crew Stadium
	Higuaín 19' 67'; Trapp (yellow card) 45'; O'Rourke (yellow card) 80'	Summary	Eckersley (yellow card) 36'	Attendance: 16,352; Referee: Ted Unkel

Aug 24 25	D.C. United	1–1	Toronto FC	RFK Stadium
	De Rosario 10'; Korb (yellow card) 83'	Report	Convey 60'	Attendance: 13,972; Referee: Chris Penso

Aug 30 26	Toronto FC	1–1	New England Revolution	BMO Field
	Wiedeman 45'; Caldwell (yellow card) 68'; Morgan (yellow card) 75'; Henry (yellow card) 86'	Stats	Fagúndez 2' (yellow card) 54'; Nguyen (yellow card) 30'; Caldwell (yellow card) 74'; Imbongo (yellow card) 87'	Attendance: 18,623

Sep 7 27	Portland Timbers	4–0	Toronto FC	Jeld-Wen Field
	Alhassan 45+1'; Wallace (yellow card) 40' (goal) 83'; Johnson (yellow card) 40' (goal) 87'; Valeri 90+3'	Stats	Agbossoumonde (yellow card) 25'; Hall (yellow card) 90+3'	Attendance: 20,674

Sep 11 28	Toronto FC	1–1	Chicago Fire	BMO Field
	Earnshaw 23'; Convey (yellow card) 29'; Braun (yellow card) 45+1'; Hall (yellow card) 71'; Henry (yellow card) 90+1'	report	Duka 20'	Attendance: 15,217; Referee: Geoff Gamble

Sep 14 29	New York Red Bulls	2–0	Toronto FC	Red Bull Arena
	Henry 32'; Espíndola 80'	report		Attendance: 17,236

Sep 21 30	Toronto FC	1–2	Sporting Kansas City	BMO Field
	Russell 38'	Stats	Sapong 18', 53'	Attendance: 12,627

Sep 28 31	Toronto FC	4–1	D.C. United	BMO Field
	Russell 25'; Dike 67'; Shanosky 71' (o.g.); Rey 87'	Stats	Jeffrey 15'	Attendance: 15,879

Oct 5 32	Philadelphia Union	1–0	Toronto FC	PPL Park
	Kléberson 90+5'	Stats		Attendance: 18,996

Oct 19 33	Chicago Fire	1–0	Toronto FC	Toyota Park
	Magee 63' (pen.)	Stats		Attendance: 19,889

Oct 26 34	Toronto FC	1–0	Montreal Impact	BMO Field
	Earnshaw 16' (yellow card) 23'	report	Bernardello (yellow card) 23'; Mapp (yellow card) 26'; Lefèvre (yellow card) 90+3'; Ferrari (yellow card) 90+4'	Attendance: 13,211; Referee: David Gantar

==== MLS regular season standings ====
===== Eastern Conference =====
Pos	Team	Pld	W	L	T	GF	GA	GD	Pts	Qualification
1	New York Red Bulls	34	17	9	8	58	41	+17	59	Qualification for the conference semifinals
2	Sporting Kansas City	34	17	10	7	47	30	+17	58	Qualification for the conference semifinals
3	New England Revolution	34	14	11	9	49	38	+11	51	Qualification for the conference semifinals
4	Houston Dynamo	34	14	11	9	41	41	0	51	Qualification for the knockout round
5	Montreal Impact	34	14	13	7	50	49	+1	49	Qualification for the knockout round
6	Chicago Fire	34	14	13	7	47	52	−5	49	
7	Philadelphia Union	34	12	12	10	42	44	−2	46	
8	Columbus Crew	34	12	17	5	42	46	−4	41	
9	Toronto FC	34	6	17	11	30	47	−17	29	
10	D.C. United	34	3	24	7	22	59	−37	16	

Source: MLS

===== Overall table =====
Note: the table below has no impact on playoff qualification and is used solely for determining host of the MLS Cup, certain CCL spots, and 2014 MLS draft. The conference tables are the sole determinant for teams qualifying to the playoffs

Pos	Team	Pld	W	L	T	GF	GA	GD	Pts	
1	New York Red Bulls (S)	34	17	9	8	58	41	+17	59	Qualification for the CONCACAF Champions League
2	Sporting Kansas City (C)	34	17	10	7	47	30	+17	58	Qualification for the CONCACAF Champions League
3	Portland Timbers	34	14	5	15	54	33	+21	57	Qualification for the CONCACAF Champions League
4	Real Salt Lake	34	16	10	8	57	41	+16	56	
5	LA Galaxy	34	15	11	8	53	38	+15	53	
6	Seattle Sounders FC	34	15	12	7	42	42	0	52	
7	New England Revolution	34	14	11	9	49	38	+11	51	
8	Colorado Rapids	34	14	11	9	45	38	+7	51	
9	Houston Dynamo	34	14	11	9	41	41	0	51	
10	San Jose Earthquakes	34	14	11	9	35	42	−7	51	
11	Montreal Impact (V)	34	14	13	7	50	49	+1	49	Qualification for the CONCACAF Champions League
12	Chicago Fire	34	14	13	7	47	52	−5	49	
13	Vancouver Whitecaps FC	34	13	12	9	53	45	+8	48	
14	Philadelphia Union	34	12	12	10	42	44	−2	46	
15	FC Dallas	34	11	12	11	48	52	−4	44	
16	Columbus Crew	34	12	17	5	42	46	−4	41	
17	Toronto FC	34	6	17	11	30	47	−17	29	
18	Chivas USA	34	6	20	8	30	67	−37	26	
19	D.C. United (U)	34	3	24	7	22	59	−37	16	Qualification for the CONCACAF Champions League

Source: MLS
Rules for classification: 1) points; 2) head-to-head record; 3) goal difference; 4) number of goals scored
(C) MLS Cup champions; (S) Supporters' Shield winners; (U) U.S. Open Cup winners; (V) Canadian Championship winners

===== Results summary =====
Overall								Home						Away					
Pld	Pts	W	L	D	GF	GA	GD	W	L	D	GF	GA	GD	W	L	D	GF	GA	GD
34	29	6	17	11	30	47	−17	4	5	8	23	22	+1	2	12	3	7	25	−18

Last updated: September 14, 2013
Source: "Toronto FC Schedule".
Pld = Matches played; Pts = Points; W = Matches won; T = Matches tied; L = Matches lost; GF = Goals for; GA = Goals against; GD = Goal difference

==== Results by round ====
Round	1	2	3	4	5	6	7	8	9	10	11	12	13	14	15	16	17	18	19	20	21	22	23	24	25	26	27	28	29	30	31	32	33	34
Ground	A	H	A	H	H	A	H	H	A	A	H	A	H	A	A	H	H	A	A	H	H	A	H	A	A	H	A	H	A	H	H	A	A	H
Result	L	W	L	D	D	D	D	L	L	L	L	L	D	W	D	L	D	L	L	D	W	W	L	L	D	D	L	D	L	L	W	L	L	W

Updated to match(es) played on September 14, 2013. Source: MLS Results
A = Away; H = Home; W = Win; D = Draw; L = Loss

=== Canadian Championship ===
==== Semi final ====
April 24 Leg 1	Toronto FC	2–0	Montreal Impact	Toronto, Ontario
	Henry 49'; Wiedeman 81'; Wiedeman (yellow card) 84'	Recap, Stats	Mallace (yellow card) 55'	Stadium: BMO Field; Attendance: 11,043; Referee: Paul Ward

May 1 Leg 2	Montreal Impact	6–0	Toronto FC	Montreal, Quebec
	Mapp 24'; Tissot (yellow card) 25'; Paponi 33'; Di Vaio 44', 90'; Romero 61'; Wenger 90+4'	Stats	Henry (yellow card) 14'; Lambe (yellow card) 17'	Stadium: Saputo Stadium; Attendance: 14,931

=== Mid-season friendly ===
August 7 Friendly	Toronto FC	1–4	Roma	Toronto, Ontario
	Burdisso 16' (o.g.)	Report	Florenzi 25'; Borriello 33'; Pjanić 67', 87'	Stadium: BMO Field; Attendance: 18,274

== Player information ==
=== Squad and statistics ===
==== Squad, appearances and goals ====
As of October 26, 2013

No.	Pos	Nat	Player	Total		Major League Soccer		Canadian Championship	
No.	Pos	Nat	Player	Apps	Goals	Apps	Goals	Apps	Goals
Goalkeeper
12	GK	(United States) USA	Joe Bendik	33	0	33+0	0	0+0	0
24	GK	(Switzerland) SUI	Stefan Frei	3	0	1+0	0	2+0	0
40	GK	(Canada) CAN	Quillan Roberts	0	0	0+0	0	0+0	0
Defenders
4	DF	(Canada) CAN	Doneil Henry	22	1	19+1	0	2+0	1
5	DF	(Canada) CAN	Ashtone Morgan	24	0	20+2	0	2+0	0
6	DF	(United States) USA	Gale Agbossoumonde	13	0	12+1	0	0+0	0
25	DF	(United States) USA	Jeremy Hall	32	1	26+5	1	0+1	0
27	DF	(England) ENG	Richard Eckersley	16	0	16+0	0	0+0	0
33	DF	(United States) USA	Ryan Richter	15	0	12+1	0	2+0	0
13	DF	(Scotland) SCO	Steven Caldwell	23	1	23+0	1	0+0	0
28	DF	(United States) USA	Mark Bloom	6	0	6+0	0	0+0	0
3	DF	(Switzerland) SUI	Jonas Elmer	3	0	1+2	0	0+0	0
Midfielders
8	MF	(Canada) CAN	Kyle Bekker	11	0	3+6	0	2+0	0
16	MF	(England) ENG	Darel Russell	18	3	10+8	3	0+0	0
19	MF	(Bermuda) BER	Reggie Lambe	29	0	20+8	0	1+0	0
21	MF	(Canada) CAN	Jonathan Osorio	30	5	18+10	5	2+0	0
20	MF	(Argentina) ARG	Matías Laba	16	1	16+0	1	0+0	0
15	MF	(United States) USA	Bobby Convey	21	1	20+1	1	0+0	0
23	MF	(Spain) ESP	Álvaro Rey	13	1	9+4	1	0+0	0
Forwards
9	FW	(Canada) CAN	Emery Welshman	2	0	0+1	0	1+0	0
10	FW	(Wales) WAL	Robert Earnshaw	27	8	23+3	8	1+0	0
14	FW	(Netherlands) NED	Danny Koevermans	4	0	1+3	0	0+0	0
17	FW	(United States) USA	Justin Braun	22	2	8+13	2	1+0	0
31	FW	(United States) USA	Andrew Wiedeman	16	3	9+5	2	2+0	1
7	FW	(Nigeria) NGR	Bright Dike	7	1	5+2	1	0+0	0
No Longer With Team
15	MF	(Canada) CAN	Matt Stinson	0	0	0+0	0	0+0	0
26	FW	(Jamaica) JAM	Ashton Bennett	1	0	0+0	0	0+1	0
28	FW	(England) ENG	Taylor Morgan	1	0	0+1	0	0+0	0
7	MF	(England) ENG	John Bostock	9	0	4+3	0	2+0	0
31	MF	(England) ENG	Hogan Ephraim	10	0	8+1	0	0+1	0
23	MF	(Canada) CAN	Terry Dunfield	4	0	4+0	0	0+0	0
48	DF	(Ireland) EIR	Darren O'Dea	17	1	17+0	1	0+0	0
11	MF	(United States) USA	Luis Silva	16	0	11+3	0	0+2	0
2	DF	(United States) USA	Logan Emory	3	0	3+0	0	0+0	0
3	DF	(United States) USA	Danny Califf	6	0	4+0	0	2+0	0
22	FW	(New Zealand) NZL	Jeremy Brockie	15	1	11+4	1	0+0	0
37	FW	(Argentina) ARG	Maximiliano Urruti	2	0	0+2	0	0+0	0

==== Goals against average ====
No.	Player	Total			Major League Soccer			Canadian Championship		
No.	Player	MP	GA	GAA	MP	GA	GAA	MP	GA	GAA
12	Joe Bendik	2970	46	1.39	2970	46	1.39	0	0	—
24	Stefan Frei	270	7	2.33	90	1	1.00	180	6	3.00
40	Quillan Roberts	0	0	—	0	0	—	0	0	—
Totals		3240	53	1.47	3060	47	1.38	180	6	3.00
Latest update: October 26, 2013

=== Transactions ===
==== In ====
Date	Player	Position	Previous club	Fee/notes	Ref
December 3, 2012	(United States) Justin Braun	FW	(United States) Real Salt Lake	Traded for Aaron Maund	
December 12, 2012	(United States) Joe Bendik	GK	(United States) Portland Timbers	Traded with 1st round 2013 SuperDraft pick & Allocation Money for Ryan Johnson & Miloš Kocić	
December 14, 2012	(United States) Danny Califf	DF	(United States) Chivas USA	Selected in stage 2 of the 2012 MLS Re-Entry Draft	
December 20, 2012	(United States) Gale Agbossoumonde	DF	(United States) Carolina RailHawks	Acquired via weighted lottery	
January 15, 2013	(Brazil) Júlio César	MF	(United States) Sporting Kansas City	Free Transfer	
January 17, 2013	(Canada) Kyle Bekker	MF	(United States) Boston College Eagles	1st round 2013 SuperDraft pick	
January 17, 2013	(Canada) Emery Welshman	FW	(United States) Oregon State Beavers	1st round 2013 SuperDraft pick	
March 1, 2013	(Wales) Robert Earnshaw	FW	(Wales) Cardiff City	Free Transfer	
March 1, 2013	(Jamaica) Ashton Bennett	FW	(United States) Coastal Carolina	2nd round 2013 Supplemental Draft pick	
March 1, 2013	(England) Taylor Morgan	FW	(United States) George Mason	4th round 2013 Supplemental Draft pick	
March 1, 2013	(Canada) Jonathan Osorio	MF	(Canada) SC Toronto	Free Transfer	
March 1, 2013	(England) Darel Russell	MF	(England) Portsmouth	Free Transfer	
March 25, 2013	(United States) Ryan Richter	DF	(United States) Charleston Battery	Free Transfer	
April 25, 2013	(Argentina) Matías Laba	MF	(Argentina) Argentinos Juniors	Undisclosed	
May 16, 2013	(United States) Bobby Convey	MF	(United States) Sporting Kansas City	Traded for a 2014 MLS SuperDraft third round pick	
July 2, 2013	(United States) Michael Thomas	MF	(United States) Sporting Kansas City	Traded for a 2015 MLS SuperDraft second round pick	
July 25, 2013	(Spain) Álvaro Rey	MF	(Spain) Xerez Club Deportivo	Undisclosed	
August 1, 2013	(Switzerland) Jonas Elmer	DF	(Switzerland) FC Winterthur	Undisclosed	
August 8, 2013	(Argentina) / (Canada) Manuel Aparicio	MF	(Canada) Toronto FC Academy	Undisclosed	
August 16, 2013	(Argentina) Maximiliano Urruti	FW	(Argentina) Newell's Old Boys	Undisclosed	
September 9, 2013	(Nigeria) Bright Dike	FW	(United States) Portland Timbers	Traded with a 2015 MLS SuperDraft first round pick & allocation money for Maximiliano Urruti & an international roster spot	
September 13, 2013	(United States) Chris Konopka	GK	(United States) Philadelphia Union	Traded for a 2014 MLS SuperDraft third round pick	

==== Loan In ====
Date	Player	Position	Previous club	Fee/notes	Ref
February 27, 2013	(England) Hogan Ephraim	MF	(England) Queens Park Rangers	Loaned until June 30, 2013	
March 8, 2013	(England) John Bostock	MF	(England) Tottenham Hotspur	TBD	
May 7, 2013	(Scotland) Steven Caldwell	DF	(England) Birmingham City	July 2013	
May 7, 2013	(New Zealand) Jeremy Brockie	FW	(New Zealand) Wellington Phoenix	TBD	
July 12, 2013	(United States) Mark Bloom	DF	(United States) Atlanta Silverbacks	Undisclosed	

==== Out ====
Date	Player	Position	Destination club	Fee/notes	Ref
November 15, 2012	(Canada) Adrian Cann	DF	(United States) San Antonio Scorpions	Released	
November 15, 2012	(United States) Ty Harden	DF		Released	
November 15, 2012	(Jamaica) Dicoy Williams	DF	(Jamaica) Harbour View	Released	
November 15, 2012	(Canada) Oscar Cordon	MF	(Canada) Brampton United	Released	
November 15, 2012	(Canada) Nicholas Lindsay	FW	(Canada) Burlington SC	Released	
November 15, 2012	(Canada) Keith Makubuya	FW	(Canada) Niagara United	Released	
December 3, 2012	(United States) Aaron Maund	DF	(United States) Real Salt Lake	Traded for Justin Braun	
December 12, 2012	(Jamaica) Ryan Johnson	FW	(United States) Portland Timbers	Traded for Joe Bendik, 1st round 2013 SuperDraft pick & Allocation Money	
December 12, 2012	(Serbia) Miloš Kocić	GK	(United States) Portland Timbers	Traded for Joe Bendik, 1st round 2013 SuperDraft pick & Allocation Money	
January 30, 2013	(Ecuador) Joao Plata	FW	(United States) Real Salt Lake	Traded for 2015 2nd Round MLS SuperDraft Pick	
February 4, 2013	(France) Eric Hassli	FW	(United States) FC Dallas	Traded for Conditional 2015 2nd Round SuperDraft Pick	
February 26, 2013	(Germany) Torsten Frings	MF		Retired	
February 27, 2013	(United States) Quincy Amarikwa	FW	(United States) Chicago Fire	Traded for 2014 1st Round Supplemental Draft Pick	
March 19, 2013	(Canada) Matt Stinson	MF		Waived	
March 29, 2013	(Brazil) Júlio César	MF		Released	
May 14, 2013	(Jamaica) Ashton Bennett	FW	(Jamaica) Portmore United	Waived	
May 14, 2013	(England) Taylor Morgan	FW		Waived	
May 24, 2013	(England) John Bostock	FW		Loan Ended/Waived	
June 13, 2013	(Canada) Terry Dunfield	MF	(England) Oldham Athletic	Waived	
June 27, 2013	(United States) Logan Emory	DF		Waived	
July 9, 2013	(United States) Luis Silva	MF	(United States) D.C. United	Traded for allocation money	
July 12, 2013	(United States) Danny Califf	DF		Retired	
July 18, 2013	(Republic of Ireland) Darren O'Dea	DF	(Ukraine) FC Metalurh Donetsk	Mutual Agreement	
September 9, 2013	(Argentina) Maximiliano Urruti	FW	(United States) Portland Timbers	Traded with an international roster spot for Bright Dike, 2015 MLS SuperDraft first round pick & allocation money	
