= Earl Edwards Jr. =

American soccer player (born 1992)

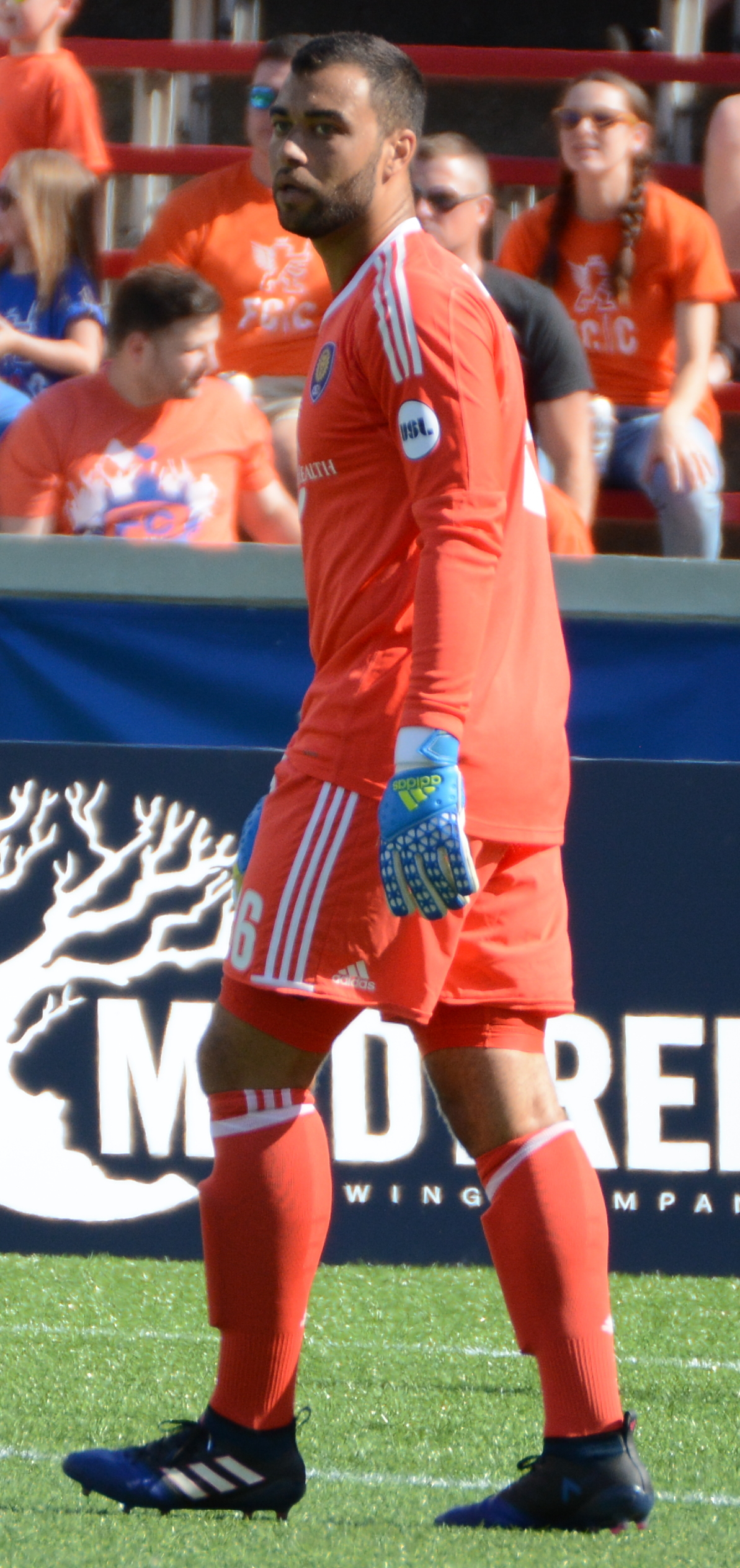
- Edwards with Orlando City B in 2017

Personal information
- Full name: Earl William Edwards Jr.
- Date of birth: January 24, 1992 (age 34)
- Place of birth: San Diego, California, United States
- Height: 6 ft 3 in (1.91 m)
- Position: Goalkeeper

Team information
- Current team: San Jose Earthquakes
- Number: 36

Youth career
- 2007–2009: IMG Academy
- 2009–2010: Nomads SC

College career
Years	Team	Apps	(Gls)
2010–2014	UCLA Bruins	61	(0)

Senior career*
Years	Team	Apps	(Gls)
2012	Ventura County Fusion	6	(0)
2013	Seattle Sounders FC U-23	8	(0)
2014	Ventura County Fusion	1	(0)
2015–2018	Orlando City	6	(0)
2016–2017	Orlando City B	25	(0)
2019–2020	D.C. United	0	(0)
2019–2020	→ Loudoun United (loan)	16	(0)
2021–2024	New England Revolution	15	(0)
2021–2022	New England Revolution II	5	(0)
2025–	San Jose Earthquakes	7	(0)

International career^{‡}
2007–2009	United States U17	17	(0)
- * Club domestic league appearances and goals as of 11 February 2026 ‡ National team caps and goals as of June 19, 2015

Earl William Edwards Jr. (born January 24, 1992) is an American professional soccer player who plays as a goalkeeper for Major League Soccer club San Jose Earthquakes.

== College and amateur ==
Edwards spent his entire college career at UCLA, including a red-shirted year in 2010. He made a total of 61 appearances for the Bruins and finished with 19 shutouts and a 1.07 Goals Against Average. He was named first team All-Pac-12 in 2013 and 2014.

Edwards also played in the Premier Development League for Ventura County Fusion and Seattle Sounders FC U-23.

== Professional career ==
=== Orlando City ===
On January 20, 2015, Edwards was selected in the third round (43rd overall) of the 2015 MLS SuperDraft by Orlando City, and he signed a professional contract with the club a month later. He made his professional debut on June 17 in a 2015 U.S. Open Cup match against Charleston Battery. Orlando went on to advance on penalties.

He was loaned to Orlando City B in March 2016 before becoming the first-choice keeper in the 2017 USL season.

He made his first MLS start on October 23, 2017, away at Philadelphia Union on the final day of the season when regular starter Joe Bendik was ruled out with concussion. Orlando lost 6–1.

On July 14, 2018, following James O'Connor's appointment as manager, he was given the start over a healthy Bendik in the midst of a nine-game losing streak. Orlando won 2–1 with Edwards registering 3 saves. Edwards would retain the starting job for five games, conceding 13 goals. He was released by the club at the end of the 2018 season when his contract expired.

=== D.C. United ===
On December 19, 2018, Edwards was acquired by D.C. United in exchange for a second-round pick in the 2019 MLS SuperDraft. On January 8, 2020, Edwards was re-signed by D.C. United for the 2020 season. He was released by D.C. United on November 30, 2020.

=== Loudoun United ===
Edwards has appeared in games for D.C. United's affiliate club, Loudoun United. He appeared the first time for Loudoun United in a game against the Tampa Bay Rowdies on March 31, 2019. He was able to keep a clean sheet in his debut as the game ended 0-0.

=== New England Revolution ===
On December 19, 2020, Edwards joined MLS side New England Revolution ahead of their 2021 season.

=== San Jose Earthquakes ===
On December 30, 2024, Edwards was acquired by the San Jose Earthquakes in exchange for $150,000 in General Allocation Money.

== International ==
Edwards was a member of the United States under-17 squad that competed at the 2009 FIFA U-17 World Cup in Nigeria.

== Honors ==
New England Revolution

- Supporters' Shield: 2021
