= Joe Bendik =

American soccer player (born 1989)

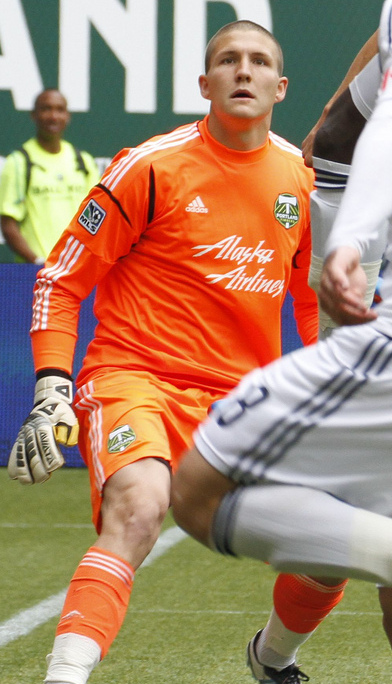
- Bendik with the Portland Timbers in 2012

Personal information
- Date of birth: April 25, 1989 (age 37)
- Place of birth: Huntington, New York, U.S.
- Height: 6 ft 3 in (1.91 m)
- Position: Goalkeeper

College career
Years	Team	Apps	(Gls)
2006–2009	Clemson Tigers	62	(0)

Senior career*
Years	Team	Apps	(Gls)
2007	Atlanta Silverbacks U23's	1	(0)
2010–2011	Sogndal	9	(0)
2012	Portland Timbers	5	(0)
2013–2015	Toronto FC	73	(0)
2016–2018	Orlando City	92	(0)
2019	Columbus Crew	6	(0)
2019–2023	Philadelphia Union	13	(0)
2024	Vancouver Whitecaps	0	(0)
Total		199	(0)

International career
2006	United States U17	9	(0)
2007–2008	United States U20	11	(0)

Managerial career
- 2025–: Chicago Fire (goalkeeping assistant)
- * Club domestic league appearances and goals as of November 5, 2023

Joseph T. Bendik (born April 25, 1989) is an American retired professional soccer player who played as a goalkeeper. He is currently the assistant goalkeeping coach for Major League Soccer club Chicago Fire.

== Club career ==
=== Clemson ===
Bendik grew up in Marietta, Georgia and attended Clemson University for four years after graduating from Harrison High School in Kennesaw, Georgia.

=== Sogndal ===
After university, Bendik signed with Norwegian club Sogndal. He began the 2010 season as a backup, and made his professional debut in the first round of the Norwegian Cup against Årdal FK. Bendik ended the season starting in four league matches helping his club gain promotion to the Norwegian top flight.

Bendik began the 2011 season as the starter and made his Tippeligaen debut on March 20, 2011, against Strømsgodset IF. He ended the year starting the final two matches of the season, including a 2–1 victory over eventual league champions Molde FK.

=== Portland Timbers ===
On February 24, 2012, Bendik signed with the Portland Timbers of MLS. He made his Timbers debut as a second-half sub for an injured Troy Perkins in a 2–0 loss to the Montreal Impact.

=== Toronto FC ===
On December 12, 2012, Bendik was acquired by Toronto FC along with Portland's third overall pick in the 2013 MLS SuperDraft in exchange for Ryan Johnson and Miloš Kocić.

While originally considered a back-up, Bendik went on to make 33 appearances for Toronto during the 2013 season after starting goalkeeper Stefan Frei was injured during a pre-season friendly.

On December 1, 2015, it was announced that Toronto FC had declined their options on Bendik, and that he would not return to the team. Along with Bendik, fellow goalkeeper Chris Konopka's options were also declined, leaving the team with only one goalkeeper Quillain Roberts.

=== Orlando City SC ===
On December 21, 2015, it was announced that Bendik had been traded to Orlando City in exchange for a conditional fourth-round pick in the 2017 MLS SuperDraft. Despite conceding a league high 60 goals for that season in his first league campaign with Orlando, Bendik became a fan favorite as he played every minute of the club's 34 league games, making 114 saves and posting 5 shutouts. He won 11 "MLS Save of the Week" awards in the process and his stop against Sporting Kansas City's Dom Dwyer in the Lions' 2–1 road loss on May 15 was voted the winner of the MLS Save of the Year Award.

After a difficult 2018 season in which the team conceded an all-time MLS record 74 goals and Bendik himself had lost the starting job to both Earl Edwards, Jr. and then again to Adam Grinwis, his contract option was declined at the end of the year. At the time of his departure he had the second most appearances in the team's post-expansion history behind only Cristian Higuita.

=== Columbus Crew SC ===
On December 27, 2018, Bendik's rights were acquired by Columbus Crew SC in exchange for $50,000 in targeted allocation money.

=== Philadelphia Union ===
On July 19, 2019, Bendik was traded to the Philadelphia Union for a second-round pick in the 2020 MLS SuperDraft. Bendik's contract expired with Philadelphia following their 2020 season. He re-signed with the club on March 5, 2021. Bendik again re-signed with the Union following their MLS Eastern Conference Championship season in 2022 on a one-year deal for the 2023 season. Bendik was elevated to the Union's No. 2 goalkeeper following the trade of Matt Freese to the New York City Football Club.

On December 4, 2023, the Philadelphia Union announced that they have confirmed Bendik's departure.

=== Vancouver Whitecaps ===
On February 17, 2024, it was announced Bendik signed a contract with Vancouver Whitecaps through the 2024 season with a club option to extend for 2025.

== Coaching career ==
On January 8, 2025, Bendik joined the coaching staff of the Chicago Fire as the assistant goalkeeping coach.

== International career ==
Bendik has represented the United States at the under-17, under-18 and under-20 levels. On June 3, Bendik was named as one of six goalkeepers in Bruce Arena's preliminary 40-man roster for the 2017 Gold Cup, although he was left off the final 23-man squad.

== Career statistics ==
=== Club ===
As of July 12, 2023

Appearances and goals by club, season and competition
Club	Season	League			National cup (Note: Includes Norwegian Football Cup and Canadian Championship)		Continental		Other		Total	
Club	Season	Division	Apps	Goals	Apps	Goals	Apps	Goals	Apps	Goals	Apps	Goals
Atlanta Silverbacks U23's	2007	PDL	1	0	–		–		–		1	0
Sogndal	2010	Adeccoligaen	4	0	2	0	–		–		6	0
Sogndal	2011	Tippeligaen	5	0	0	0	–		–		5	0
Sogndal	Total		9	0	2	0	0	0	0	0	11	0
Portland Timbers	2012	MLS	5	0	0	0	–		–		5	0
Toronto FC	2013	MLS	33	0	0	0	–		–		33	0
Toronto FC	2014	MLS	27	0	4	0	–		–		31	0
Toronto FC	2015	MLS	13	0	0	0	–		0	0	13	0
Toronto FC	Total		73	0	4	0	0	0	0	0	77	0
Orlando City	2016	MLS	34	0	0	0	–		–		34	0
Orlando City	2017	MLS	33	0	0	0	–		–		33	0
Orlando City	2018	MLS	25	0	0	0	–		–		25	0
Orlando City	Total		92	0	0	0	0	0	0	0	92	0
Columbus Crew SC	2019	MLS	6	0	0	0	–		–		6	0
Philadelphia Union	2019	MLS	0	0	–		–		0	0	0	0
Philadelphia Union	2020	MLS	2	0	–		–		0	0	2	0
Philadelphia Union	2021	MLS	3	0	–		0	0	0	0	3	0
Philadelphia Union	2022	MLS	0	0	0	0	–		0	0	0	0
Philadelphia Union	2023	MLS	8	0	0	0	1	0	0	0	9	0
Philadelphia Union	Total		13	0	0	0	1	0	0	0	14	0
Career total			199	0	6	0	1	0	0	0	206	0

== Honors ==
Sogndal

- Norwegian First Division Championship: 2010

Philadelphia Union

- Supporters' Shield: 2020

Individual

- MLS Save of the Year Award: 2016
