= Jonathan Spector =

American former soccer player (born 1986)

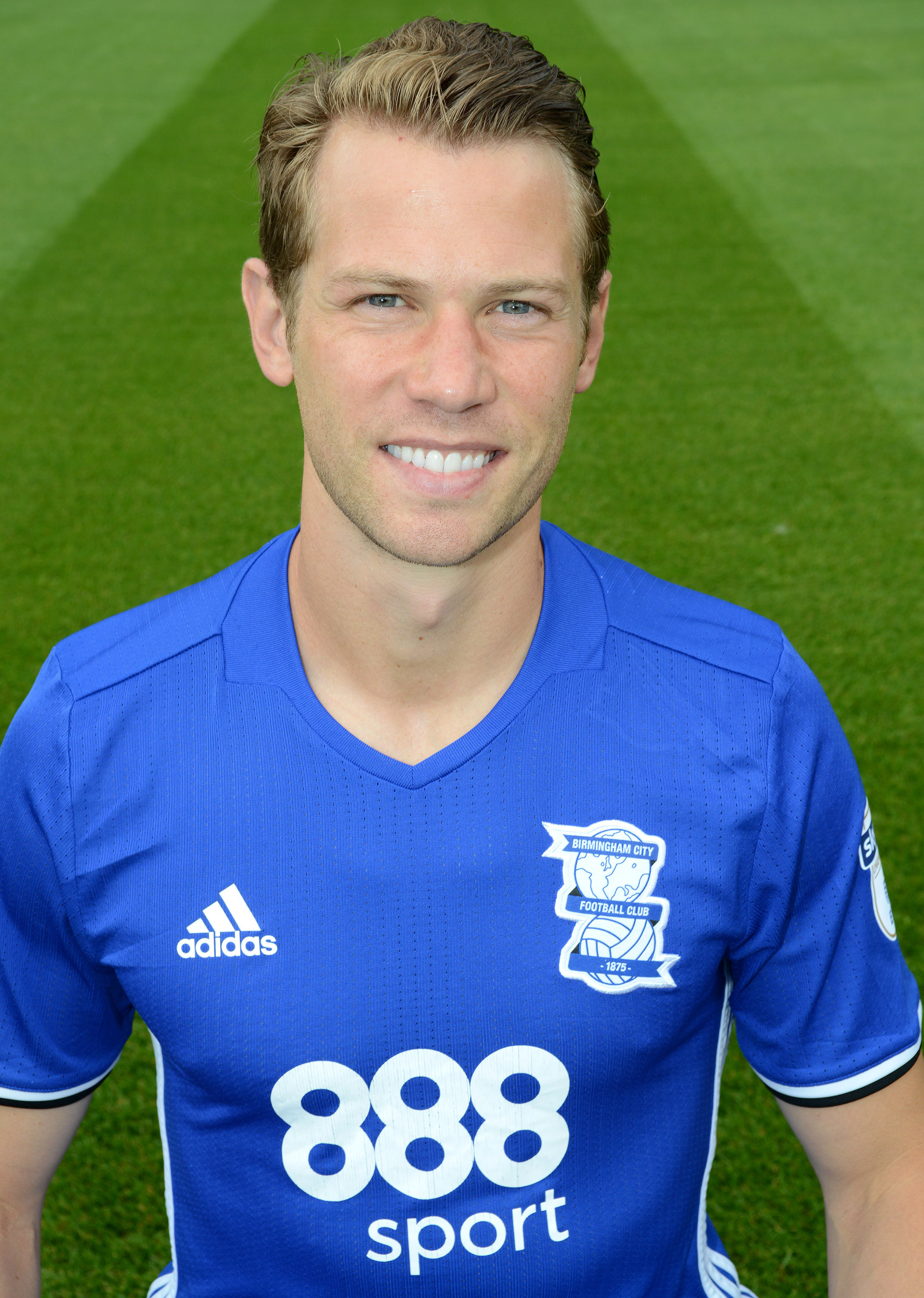
- Spector with Birmingham City in 2016

Personal information
- Full name: Jonathan Michael Paul Spector
- Date of birth: March 1, 1986 (age 40)
- Place of birth: Arlington Heights, Illinois, United States
- Height: 6 ft 0 in (1.83 m)
- Position: Defender

Youth career
- 2002–2003: Bradenton Academy
- 2003: Chicago Sockers
- 2003: Chicago Fire
- 2003: Manchester United

Senior career*
Years	Team	Apps	(Gls)
2003–2006	Manchester United	3	(0)
2005–2006	→ Charlton Athletic (loan)	20	(0)
2006–2011	West Ham United (Note: Although statistical sources including Soccerbase and Spector's West Ham profile give him two league goals for the club, his first West Ham "goal", against Derby County in November 2007, was credited as an own goal by the Dubious Goals Panel, so the figure of one league goal in total is correct.)	101	(1)
2011–2017	Birmingham City	153	(0)
2017–2018	Orlando City	38	(1)
2019	Hibernian	1	(0)
Total		316	(2)

International career
2003	United States U17	19	(0)
2005	United States U20	2	(0)
2004–2015	United States	36	(0)
Medal record
Representing United States
FIFA Confederations Cup
Runner-up	2009 South Africa	Team
CONCACAF Gold Cup
Winner	2007 United States
Runner-up	2011 United States
CONCACAF Cup
Runner-up	2015 United States
- * Club domestic league appearances and goals

Jonathan Michael Paul Spector (born March 1, 1986) is an American former soccer player who played as a defender. In his 16-year career playing first-team soccer he played over 400 games for club and country, and helped the United States win the CONCACAF Gold Cup in 2007. He earned 36 caps for the United States national team. He is now the Head of Scouting for MLS side Atlanta United.

Spector started his professional career in England when he was signed by Manchester United as a teenager, but rarely appeared for the club. He played on loan at Charlton Athletic, then in 2006 joined West Ham United, for whom he played over 100 games before he was released at the end of the 2010–11 season. He then spent five and a half seasons with Birmingham City. Spector then played for MLS club Orlando City and had a short spell with Scottish club Hibernian. He retired as a player in 2019.

Although he began playing as a striker during his youth career, Spector was converted into a defender as a professional. He most commonly played as a right-back, although he occasionally appeared across the defensive line and in central midfield.

== Early life ==
Spector was born and grew up in the Chicago suburb of Arlington Heights, Illinois the youngest of four children. He is Lutheran, but his paternal grandfather was Jewish. His father is of Russian, English and Irish ancestry, and his mother was born in Siegen, Germany. As a result, Spector has a German passport, which allowed him to play in England without needing a work permit. Spector's grandfather, Art Spector, was an NBA basketball player and the first player to be signed by the Boston Celtics in 1946, which led to him becoming known as the "Original Celtic". Art died in June 1987, when Jonathan was 15 months old.

Spector attended St. Peter Lutheran Junior High School and St. Viator High School, where he played high school soccer. He was an Amateur Athletic Union basketball standout. He started his club soccer career with Schwaben AC in Buffalo Grove, Illinois, before joining national power Chicago Sockers (2003). He also played youth soccer with Chicago Fire (2003) and Manchester United (2003). He graduated from the United States Soccer Federation's Bradenton Academy at the age of 17 in the summer of 2003.

== Club career ==
=== Manchester United ===
Spector was discovered by a Manchester United scout while playing for the American Under-17 squad at the Milk Cup in 2003. Originally a striker, Spector was lined up in defense due to injuries for a game the scout had attended to scout other players. Impressed by Spector's defending, the scout alerted the club.

Spector joined United in summer 2003. He won the club's Young Player of the Year award for the 2003–04 season. He made his first appearance for the first team in the FA Community Shield match against Arsenal in August 2004. In December, United manager Sir Alex Ferguson announced that Spector would be loaned out to fellow Premier League side Blackburn Rovers for the remainder of the season. However, Ferguson was forced to postpone the deal due to an injury crisis in the United defense. The injury crisis continued and Spector was not able to make his loan move before the transfer window closed on January 31, 2005. Before the start of the 2005–06 season, Spector went on a season-long loan to another Premiership club, Charlton Athletic, to obtain more first-team experience. He finished the season with 16 starts and eight substitute appearances.

=== West Ham United ===
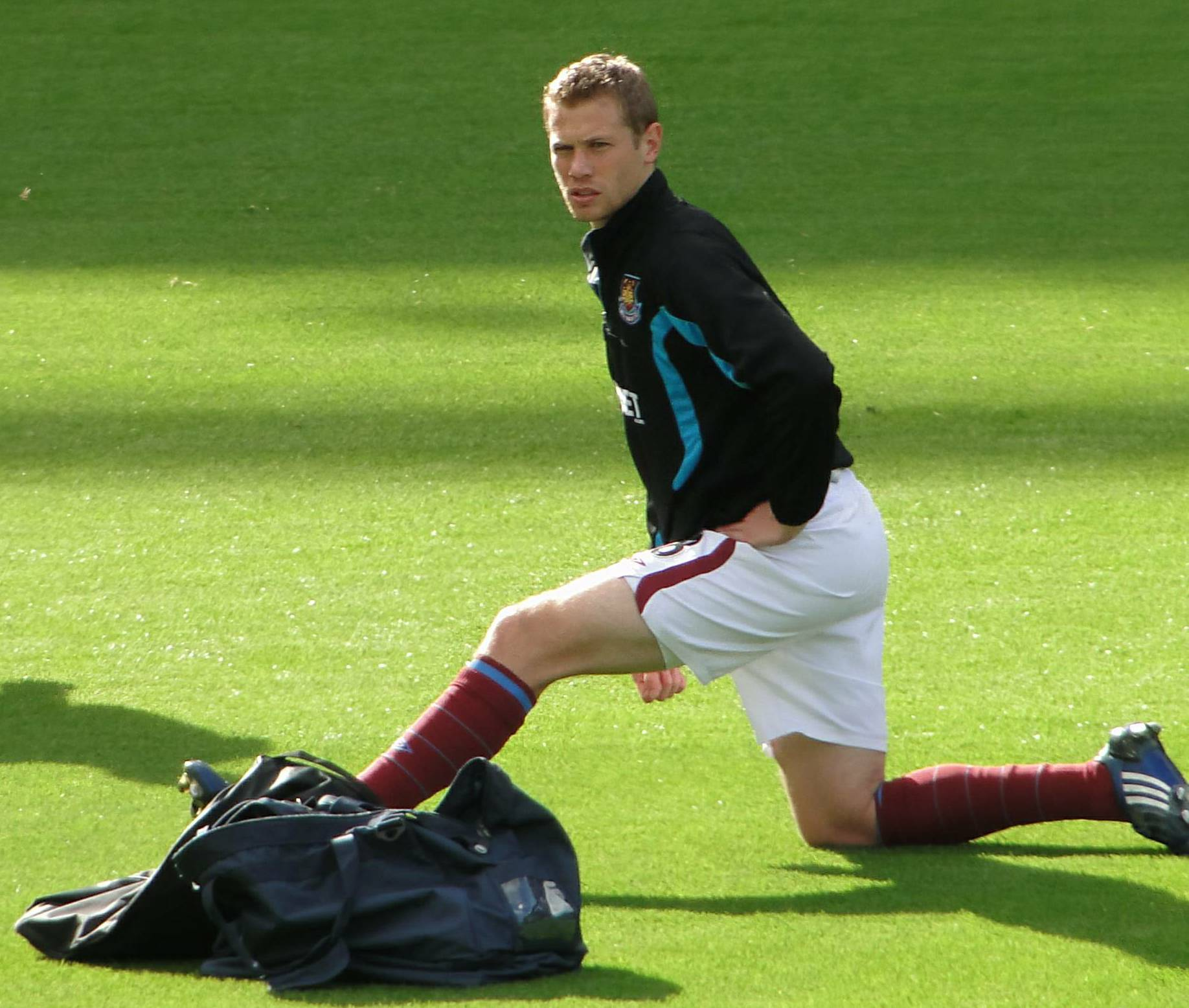
Spector with West Ham United in 2009

Spector was signed by manager Alan Pardew for West Ham United in a deal initially worth £500,000 in June 2006, ending his association with Manchester United after eight appearances. He made his debut for the club in the first round defeat of the UEFA Cup against Palermo in Sicily on September 28, going on to make twenty-eight appearances in all competitions in the 2006–07 season. Spector had initially been brought as backup to the West Ham defense, but he had an extended run of games due to injury problems and his ability to play anywhere in the back four with equal ease. On November 10, 2007, it was believed that Spector had scored his first professional goal, in the 5–0 away win at Derby County. However, this was later credited as an own goal by Derby's fellow American international Eddie Lewis.

He missed most of the 2008–09 season due to injuries, but following the departure of Lucas Neill, Spector played in 27 of a possible 38 games in the 2009–10 season. Many of his appearances that year came at left-back, despite being a right footed player. When Gianfranco Zola left, new manager Avram Grant began deploying Spector in the midfield. He scored his first goals for West Ham and first in English football, scoring twice in a 4–0 home win over former club Manchester United in the League Cup on November 30, 2010. He scored his first Premier League goal in the 2–2 draw away to Everton later that season. Spector was released by West Ham in June 2011.

=== Birmingham City ===
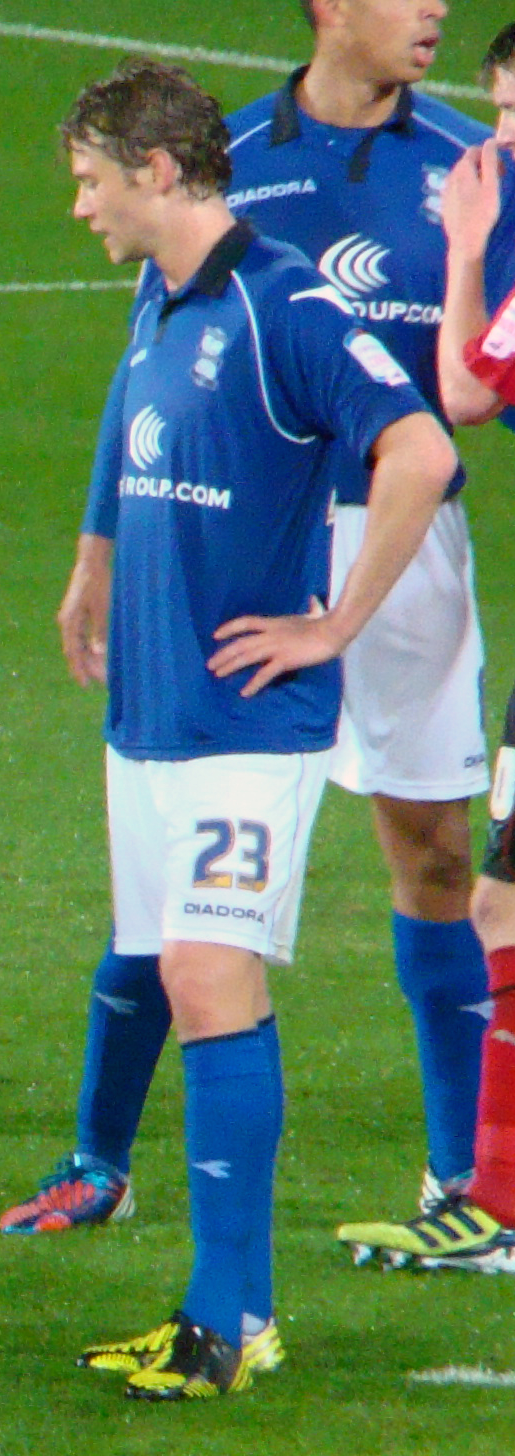
Spector playing for Birmingham City in 2012

Spector signed a two-year contract with Championship club Birmingham City in August 2011, four days before the opening of the league season. He made his debut in Birmingham's first match in major European competition for nearly 50 years, the Europa League play-off round first leg against Portuguese club Nacional, which finished goalless. Three days later, he played his first league game in English soccer at a level below the Premier League, in a 3–1 defeat at Middlesbrough. Spector was played in central midfield for the first few months of his Birmingham City career, a position he said he enjoyed, and filled in at right-back in the European matches as Birmingham failed by a point to progress past the group stage. Later in the season, he was used more frequently at right-back, at the expense of captain Stephen Carr, and occasionally at left-back. The Birmingham Mail's end-of-season review viewed his versatility as "an invaluable asset". He missed the last two months of the season with a torn thigh muscle, returning for Birmingham's unsuccessful play-off campaign only to suffer a recurrence of the injury which was to keep him out of the summer's international program.

Carr was injured in the final pre-season game, and the only alternative right-back was the teenaged Will Packwood. Despite having taken no part in the warm-up games, Spector returned to action in the opening match of the 2012–13 season, as a second-half substitute for Packwood, and started the next, though "short of match sharpness, he was rusty and had a torrid time of it". He scored his first goal for Birmingham in a 3–2 defeat by Coventry City in the League Cup on August 28. New manager Lee Clark preferred his "drive and energy" in midfield, with right-back duties shared between Packwood, loan signing Paul Caddis and others, but injuries soon forced his return to full-back. Spector was restricted to 10 appearances in the second half of the season by a succession of minor injuries, culminating in ankle damage sustained in early April that kept him out for what remained of the campaign. Although several senior players were released at the end of the season, Spector agreed a further two-year contract, which he signed after he and wife Olivia Metzinger returned from honeymoon.

Two weeks later, Spector fractured his cheekbone in five places during a pre-season game. He returned to Birmingham's midfield for the 3–2 defeat by Leicester City in late August, and a month later was involved in an eventful match at Queens Park Rangers. He had a goal disallowed shortly before QPR took the lead, and after 79 minutes was yellow-carded for diving in the penalty area when it appeared that Richard Dunne had tripped him. In mid-October, he tore a thigh muscle in training. This time, the injury kept him out for four months; he returned in mid-February 2014, and was a regular starter from then on, as Birmingham avoided relegation to League One on goal difference via a stoppage-time equalizer in the last match of the season.

Again, Spector began the 2014–15 season as a regular starter, tore a thigh muscle a couple of months in, and missed the next four months. By the time he regained fitness, Gary Rowett had replaced Clark as manager, Caddis was the right-back of choice, and Michael Morrison and Paul Robinson had established themselves at center-back, which Spector had told Rowett was his position of choice. When Morrison injured an ankle in late January, he came back into the team in that position, initially with Robinson, then partnering loanee Rob Kiernan, and finishing the season, after a minor injury that coincided with Morrison's return to fitness, playing alongside the latter.

Although Spector had hinted that he had been away from home and wider family long enough, and there was reported interest from Major League Soccer clubs, he confirmed that he and his wife felt settled in Birmingham, and signed a new two-year contract. He went through the 2015–16 season injury free. He alternated at starting center-back with the veteran Robinson, and although he enjoyed no more onfield time than in either of the preceding two seasons, he was almost ever-present in the matchday squad. After Rowett decided that Paul Caddis's fitness levels were too low, Spector began the 2016–17 season at right-back. He continued in that position until and after Gianfranco Zola – who had managed Spector at West Ham – replaced Rowett in December. By January 2017, Spector had decided he wanted to return to the United States. With the emergence of Josh Dacres-Cogley, who played at right back while Spector served a suspension in November, and the arrival of Emilio Nsue, Zola felt able to accede to his request. He made a total of 179 appearances in all competitions for Birmingham.

=== Orlando City ===
Birmingham City canceled Spector's contract by mutual consent, and on January 24, 2017, he signed with Orlando City of Major League Soccer. On March 5, he made his Major League Soccer debut for Orlando City in their first game of the 2017 season that resulted in a 1–0 win over New York City FC and saw Spector named to the MLS Team of the Week. He was named club captain prior to the start of the 2018 season following the departure of Kaká. After a season mostly spent battling against injuries, the club announced they were declining his contract option, making him a free agent. He played 38 games for the club over two years.

=== Hibernian ===
Scottish Premiership club Hibernian signed Spector on a short-term contract in March 2019. Spector was released by Hibernian in May 2019, having made one appearance, in an Edinburgh derby win against Hearts.

He officially announced his retirement as an active player on August 11, 2019. In his 16-year career playing first-team football, he played over 400 games for club and country, and helped the United States win the CONCACAF Gold Cup in 2007.

Later that month, he was appointed the Head of International Player Recruitment and Development for MLS side Atlanta United FC.

== International career ==
In 2003, Spector played for the United States national team at the World Under-17 Championship in Finland and earned his first cap for the senior team on November 17, 2004, in a World Cup qualifier against Jamaica.

In 2005, Spector was part of the United States Under-20 team at the 2005 FIFA World Youth Championship in the Netherlands and as the 2005–06 Premier League season approached its conclusion, was considered a long shot to be included in the United States World Cup squad. However, a shoulder injury sustained on April 17 in a game against Portsmouth ended his chances of playing at the World Cup.

Spector was a member of the United States team that beat Mexico 2–1 in the CONCACAF Gold Cup Final in Chicago in June 2007. However, during the final, he had to be substituted by Frankie Simek as he collided heads with Mexican midfielder Andrés Guardado. Immediately after the substitution Benny Feilhaber struck the winning volley.

Following injuries to Steve Cherundolo and Frankie Hejduk, Spector was included in the United States roster for the 2009 FIFA Confederations Cup and took the chance to cement his place in the national team, starting at right-back for the entire tournament. He assisted Clint Dempsey to score a vital goal against Egypt in the last group stage match as the United States scraped through to the semifinals on the basis of goals scored. In the final against Brazil, Spector once again assisted Dempsey in scoring the opening goal with a similar long cross from the right flank.

Having returned from a long injury lay-off, Spector was ever present at right-back for the remaining 2010 World Cup fourth round qualifiers in 2009 although he has also been partnered with captain Carlos Bocanegra in central defense occasionally due to Oguchi Onyewu's long-term injury. He was rested for the United States' last qualifying match against Costa Rica on October 14 as qualification had already been secured and was recalled for friendlies in November and March. Coach Bob Bradley included him in the final 23-man squad for the World Cup although he did not appear in any games. Later in 2010, Spector was a starting right-back in friendlies against Brazil and Colombia.

Spector received his first call-up to the senior national team in 18 months when he was added to the squad ahead of September 2015 friendlies against Peru and Brazil; he played in the second game, as a second-half substitute in a 4–1 defeat. He earned 36 caps for the United States between 2004 and 2015.

== Career statistics ==
=== Club ===
As of May 20, 2019

Appearances and goals by club, season and competition
Club	Season	League			National Cup		League Cup		Continental		Other		Total	
Club	Season	Division	Apps	Goals	Apps	Goals	Apps	Goals	Apps	Goals	Apps	Goals	Apps	Goals
Manchester United	2004–05	Premier League	3	0	1	0	1	0	2 (Note: Appearances in UEFA Champions League)	0	1 (Note: Appearance in FA Community Shield)	0	8	0
Charlton Athletic (loan)	2005–06	Premier League	20	0	2	0	2	0	—		—		24	0
West Ham United	2006–07	Premier League	25	0	2	0	0	0	1 (Note: Appearance in UEFA Cup)	0	—		28	0
West Ham United	2007–08	Premier League	26	0	1	0	1	0	—		—		28	0
West Ham United	2008–09	Premier League	9	0	0	0	0	0	—		—		9	0
West Ham United	2009–10	Premier League	27	0	0	0	2	0	—		—		29	0
West Ham United	2010–11	Premier League	14	1	3	1	4	2	—		—		21	4
West Ham United	Total		101	1	6	1	7	2	1	0	—		115	4
Birmingham City	2011–12	Championship	31	0	5	0	1	0	8 (Note: Appearances in UEFA Europa League)	0	2 (Note: Appearances in Football League Championship play-offs)	0	47	0
Birmingham City	2012–13	Championship	29	0	0	0	1	1	—		—		30	1
Birmingham City	2013–14	Championship	22	0	0	0	2	0	—		—		24	0
Birmingham City	2014–15	Championship	24	0	0	0	2	0	—		—		26	0
Birmingham City	2015–16	Championship	25	0	1	0	3	0	—		—		29	0
Birmingham City	2016–17	Championship	22	0	1	0	0	0	—		—		23	0
Birmingham City	Total	Championship	153	0	7	0	9	1	8	0	2	0	179	1
Orlando City	2017	MLS	25	1	1	0	—		—		0	0	26	1
Orlando City	2018	MLS	13	0	2	0	—		—		0	0	15	0
Orlando City	Total		38	1	3	0	—		—		0	0	41	1
Hibernian	2018–19	Scottish Premiership	1	0	—		—		—		—		1	0
Career total			316	2	19	1	19	3	11	0	3	0	368	6

=== International appearances ===
As of 20 May 2019

Appearances and goals by national team and year
National team	Year	Apps	Goals
United States	2004	1	0
United States	2005	2	0
United States	2006	0	0
United States	2007	8	0
United States	2008	1	0
United States	2009	11	0
United States	2010	5	0
United States	2011	5	0
United States	2012	1	0
United States	2013	0	0
United States	2014	0	0
United States	2015	2	0
Total		36	0

== Honors ==
Individual

- Jimmy Murphy Young Player of the Year: 2003–04

== See also ==
- List of select Jewish association football (soccer) players
