= Will Johnson (soccer) =

Canadian soccer player (born 1987)

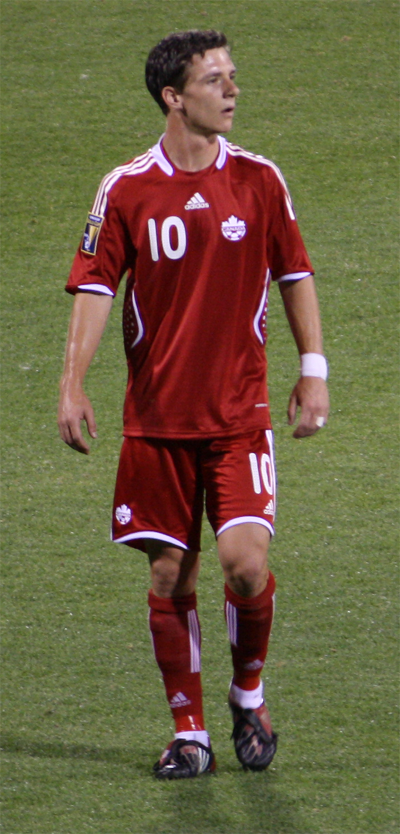
- Will Johnson playing for Canada in 2009

Personal information
- Full name: William David Johnson
- Date of birth: January 21, 1987 (age 39)
- Place of birth: Toronto, Ontario, Canada
- Height: 1.78 m (5 ft 10 in)
- Position: Midfielder

Team information
- Current team: Central Florida Crusaders

Youth career
- 1996–1998: Woodridge Storm
- 1999-2002: Chicago Sockers FC
- 2003–2004: Blackburn Rovers

Senior career*
Years	Team	Apps	(Gls)
2004–2005	Chicago Fire Reserves	9	(3)
2005	Chicago Fire	6	(1)
2006–2008	Heerenveen	14	(1)
2007–2008	→ De Graafschap (loan)	26	(2)
2008–2012	Real Salt Lake	114	(9)
2013–2015	Portland Timbers	69	(15)
2015	→ Portland Timbers 2 (loan)	3	(0)
2016	Toronto FC	23	(2)
2017–2019	Orlando City	75	(4)
2021–	Central Florida Panthers	4	(2)
2022–	Central Florida Crusaders (indoor)	0	(0)

International career^{‡}
2005–2007	Canada U20	32	(5)
2008	Canada U23	3	(3)
2005–2019	Canada	45	(4)
- * Club domestic league appearances and goals as of December 18, 2022 ‡ National team caps and goals as of September 11, 2019

William David Johnson (born January 21, 1987) is a Canadian soccer player who plays for Central Florida Panthers in the National Premier Soccer League and the Central Florida Crusaders in the National Indoor Soccer League. A versatile midfielder, Johnson has represented Canada internationally.

== Club career ==
=== Youth ===
Johnson was born in Canada, but moved shortly afterwards to England where he started playing soccer, attending the Merchant Taylors' School in Crosby, near Liverpool. When he was 10 his family once again moved, this time to Woodridge, Illinois, and he played youth soccer for the Sockers FC Chicago. Johnson later returned to England to play for the youth team of Blackburn Rovers in the 2003–04 season. However, after the season he left Blackburn and returned to Illinois. He was on the roster of Chicago Fire Reserves in the USL Premier Development League, but did not feature in any PDL games.

=== Chicago Fire ===
In 2005, Johnson was signed by the Chicago Fire as a discovery player. Johnson played most of the year for the reserve team in the MLS Reserve League but he did play in six games for the first team, where he scored a goal. After the year the Fire offered him a $28,000 contract, which he rejected. Johnson then went on a trial with Heerenveen, which was successful, and they signed him to a one-year deal plus a club option for two more years.

=== Heerenveen ===
He made 14 appearances, all as a sub, for Heerenveen in the 2006–2007 season, scoring the second goal in a 2–0 defeat of NEC Nijmegen on December 27, 2006. For the 2007–2008 season he was on loan to Doetinchem side De Graafschap, who were promoted as champions of the Dutch Eerste Divisie. Again he mostly made sub appearances and he returned to SC Heerenveen for the 2008–09 season. While back training in Heerenveen for preseason, MLS team Real Salt Lake offered Johnson a contract, which he accepted.

=== Real Salt Lake ===
Johnson signed with Major League Soccer on August 16, 2008. Chicago traded his rights to Real Salt Lake in return for a conditional 4th round pick in the 2009 MLS SuperDraft and a 2nd round pick in the 2011 MLS SuperDraft.

Johnson won the MLS Goal of the Year Award in 2008 for a goal scored against FC Dallas on October, 18 in Rio Tinto Stadium. He was called up for the 2009 MLS All-Star Game against English Premier League side Everton. He was one of three players to score their penalties in the penalty shootout against American goalkeeper Tim Howard. He started and played 45 minutes for Real Salt Lake in the 2009 MLS Cup final against the Los Angeles Galaxy despite a bout with food poisoning, with his side ultimately winning in a penalty shootout.

=== Portland Timbers ===
Johnson was traded to the Portland Timbers on December 3, 2012, as part of a salary cap issue, along with the trade or release of six other Real Salt Lake players, including starters Jámison Olave, Fabián Espíndola, and substitute Jonny Steele. Johnson was named team captain by coach Caleb Porter on February 26, 2013; former team captain Jack Jewsbury was renamed club captain. On March 30, 2013, Johnson scored his first goal for Portland against Colorado Rapids scoring both goals in 2–2 draw, he was awarded MLS player of the week for his performance. Johnson was put on the 2014 MLS All Star roster. He was brought in at halftime, became captain at the 73rd minute after Landon Donovan was substituted, and at the 88th minute received a yellow card for a hard tackle on Bayern midfielder Bastian Schweinsteiger, the latter received a bruised ankle and had to exit what would be his last game until November. A collision with Toronto FC defender Mark Bloom early in the September 27, 2014 game fractured the tibia and fibula in Johnson's right leg, ending his season early.

=== Toronto FC ===
In December 2015, Johnson was traded to Toronto FC in exchange for a conditional second-round pick in the 2017 MLS SuperDraft and targeted allocation money. On May 1, 2016, he scored his first goal for Toronto in a 2–1 away defeat to his former team, the Portland Timbers. On June 29, 2016, he scored the winning goal in the 95th minute of the Canadian Championship for Toronto to defeat the Vancouver Whitecaps 2–2 on aggregate, winning on away goals. In scoring that goal, Johnson collided with Whitecaps goalkeeper David Ousted, resulting in a tibial plateau fracture of his left leg.

=== Orlando City SC ===
In December 2016, Orlando City SC announced that they had signed Johnson to a two-year contract, with an option for a third year. Johnson's contract expired after the 2019 season. He retired from professional soccer shortly after, taking up a financial advisor role with Morgan Stanley.

=== Central Florida Panthers/Crusaders ===
On May 2, 2021, Johnson made a return to soccer, signing as a player and player-mentor with developmental NPSL team Central Florida Panthers.

In August 2022, he signed with the Central Florida Crusaders of the National Indoor Soccer League.

== International career ==
In the summers of 2005 and 2007, Johnson played for the U-20 Canada national team at the 2005 and 2007 World Youth Championships in the Netherlands and Canada respectively. Johnson also played very well for the Canada U-23 side during the 2008 CONCACAF Olympic Qualifying Tournament. Johnson scored three goals in three games during the tournament. However, Canada failed to qualify for the Olympics after falling 3–0 to the United States in the semifinals.

He made his senior debut for Canada in a November 2005 friendly match against Luxembourg. By December 2009, he had earned a total of 10 caps, scoring no goals. He has so far represented Canada in two FIFA Tournaments Johnson provided the assist to André Hainault winning goal against Belarus on March 29, 2011. He scored his first international goal in a World Cup Qualifying match against Saint Lucia on September 2, 2011.

On June 27, 2013, Johnson was listed as a part of the confirmed 23-man squad for Colin Miller's Canada squad for the 2013 CONCACAF Gold Cup, making it his third consecutive Gold Cup. Miller named Johnson as team captain for the tournament.

On December 12, 2013, Johnson was awarded the Canadian Men's Player of the Year by the CSA for the first time of his career. Johnson beat out two-time winner Atiba Hutchinson who was voted second and Patrice Bernier in third for the award.

After almost two years since his last call-up, during which he dealt with illness, injuries, and personal commitments, Johnson was recalled to the national team by Canada coach Benito Floro for 2018 FIFA World Cup qualification matches against Dominica on June 2, 2015.

In May 2019, John Herdman recalled Johnson to the national team for the 2019 CONCACAF Gold Cup.

== Personal life ==
=== Family ===
Johnson's grandfather is Brian Birch, who had a successful career with Bolton Wanderers, including an FA Cup winners medal in 1958. Johnson was married to Caroline Childs. They have a daughter, Arabella Capri, born October 2012, and a son, Jaxx Beckett, born September 5, 2014. Johnson also holds U.S. citizenship.

=== Legal issues ===
On September 6, 2017, Johnson was arrested on a domestic battery charge against his wife, and suspended from the team while the incident was being investigated by both local police and the league. No charges were brought and in October 2017 Johnson was reinstated by the league.

== Career statistics ==
=== Club ===
As of match played August 25, 2022

Appearances and goals by club, season and competition
Club	Season	League			Playoffs (Note: Includes MLS Cup & Eredivisie playoff matches.)		National Cup (Note: Includes U.S. Open Cup, KNVB Cup and Canadian Championship matches.)		Continental (Note: Includes CONCACAF Champions League matches.)		Total	
Club	Season	Division	Apps	Goals	Apps	Goals	Apps	Goals	Apps	Goals	Apps	Goals
Chicago Fire Reserves	2004	PDL	0	0	—		—		—		0	0
Chicago Fire Reserves	2005	MLS Reserve League	9	3	—		—		—		9	3
Chicago Fire Reserves	Total		9	3	0	0	0	0	0	0	9	3
Chicago Fire	2005	MLS	6	1	0	0	4	0	—		10	1
Heerenveen	2006–07	Eredivisie	14	1	1 (Note: Appearance in Eredivisie European playoffs)	0	0	0	—		15	1
Heerenveen	2007–08	Eredivisie	0	0	—		—		—		0	0
Heerenveen	Total		14	1	1	0	0	0	0	0	15	1
De Graafschap (loan)	2007–08	Eredivisie	26	2	1 (Note: Appearance in Eredivisie relegation playoffs)	0	2	0	—		29	2
Real Salt Lake	2008	MLS	9	2	3	0	0	0	—		12	2
Real Salt Lake	2009	MLS	26	1	4	0	0	0	—		30	1
Real Salt Lake	2010	MLS	28	1	2	0	0	0	6	3	36	4
Real Salt Lake	2011	MLS	25	2	3	0	2	0	6	0	36	2
Real Salt Lake	2012	MLS	26	3	2	0	0	0	4	0	32	3
Real Salt Lake	Total		114	9	14	0	2	0	16	3	146	12
Real Salt Lake Reserves	2012	MLS Reserve League	2	0	—		—		—		2	0
Portland Timbers	2013	MLS	28	9	4	2	3	0	—		35	11
Portland Timbers	2014	MLS	29	6	—		2	1	1	1	32	8
Portland Timbers	2015	MLS	12	0	1	0	0	0	—		13	0
Portland Timbers	Total		69	15	5	2	5	1	1	1	80	19
Portland Timbers 2	2015	USL	3	0	—		—		—		3	0
Toronto FC	2016	MLS	23	2	6	0	3	1	—		32	3
Orlando City	2017	MLS	26	2	0	0	0	0	—		26	2
Orlando City	2018	MLS	28	1	0	0	3	0	—		31	1
Orlando City	2019	MLS	21	1	0	0	2	0	—		23	1
Orlando City	Total		75	4	0	0	5	0	0	0	80	4
Central Florida Panthers	2021	NPSL	2	2	—		—		—		2	2
Central Florida Panthers	2022	NPSL	1	0	0	0	—		—		1	0
Central Florida Panthers	Total		3	2	0	0	0	0	0	0	3	2
Career total			344	39	27	2	21	2	17	4	409	47

=== International ===
As of match played September 10, 2019

Canada national team
Year	Apps	Goals
2005	1	0
2006	2	0
2007	1	0
2008	1	0
2009	5	0
2010	3	0
2011	11	1
2012	7	2
2013	3	0
2014	0	0
2015	4	1
2016	3	0
2017	2	0
2018	0	0
2019	2	0
Total	45	4

==== International goals ====
As of match played March 29, 2016: Canada score listed first, score column indicates score after each Johnson goal.

International goals by date, venue, cap, opponent, score, result and competition
No.	Date	Venue	Cap	Opponent	Score	Result	Competition
1	September 2, 2011	BMO Field, Toronto, Canada	19	Saint Lucia	4–1	4–1	2014 FIFA World Cup qualification
2	August 15, 2012	Central Broward Regional Park, Lauderhill, United States	27	Trinidad and Tobago	2–0	2–0	Friendly
3	October 12, 2012	BMO Field, Toronto, Canada	29	Cuba	2–0	3–0	2014 FIFA World Cup qualification
4	September 8, 2015	FFB Stadium, Belmopan, Belize	35	Belize	1–1	1–1	2018 FIFA World Cup qualification

== Honours ==
=== Club ===
Real Salt Lake

- MLS Cup: 2009

Portland Timbers

- MLS Cup: 2015

Toronto FC

- Canadian Championship: 2016
- Trillium Cup: 2016

=== Individual ===
- MLS All-Star (3) : 2009, 2013, 2014
- MLS Best XI: 2013
- Timbers Supporters Player of the Year: 2013
- Canadian Player of the Year: 2013
- MLS Goal of the Year: 2008

== See also ==
- List of current Major League Soccer players with national team caps
