= Badji =

Badji is a surname. Notable people with the surname include:

- Bassirou Badji, Senegalese basketball player
- Dominique Badji (born 1992), Senegalese footballer
- Fayçal Badji (born 1974), Algerian footballer
- Landing Badji, Senegalese politician
- Mbaye Badji (born 1976), Senegalese footballer
- Ndiss Kaba Badji (born 1983), Senegalese long jumper and triple jumper
- Stéphane Badji (born 1990), Senegalese footballer
- Youssouph Badji (born 2001), Senegalese footballer
