= 2019 New England Revolution season =

New England Revolution
2019 season
- Owner: Robert Kraft; Jonathan Kraft (Kraft Group)
- President: Brian Bilello
- Head coach: Bruce Arena
- Stadium: Gillette Stadium; Foxborough, Massachusetts
- MLS: Conference: 7th Overall: 14th
- MLS Cup Playoffs: First Round
- U.S. Open Cup: Round of 16
- Highest home attendance: 28,602 (September 29 vs. NYCFC)
- Lowest home attendance: 9,422 (April 24 vs. Montreal Impact)
- Average home league attendance: 16,737
- Biggest win: 4–0 (July 17 vs. Vancouver)
- Biggest defeat: 1–6 (May 4 at Philadelphia); 0–5 (May 8 at Chicago Fire)
Home colors	Away colors

The 2019 New England Revolution season was the team's 24th season of existence, and their 24th season in Major League Soccer, the top-flight of American soccer.

== Current squad ==
As of January 19, 2019

No.	Position	Nation	Player
1	GK	USA	Cody Cropper
2	DF	USA	Andrew Farrell
3	DF	USA	Jalil Anibaba
5	MF	USA	Isaac Angking (HGP)
6	MF	USA	Scott Caldwell (HGP)
7	FW	CAN	Brian Wright
8	DF	USA	Edgar Castillo
9	FW	COL	Juan Fernando Caicedo (Int)
10	FW	USA	Teal Bunbury
11	FW	CAN	Tajon Buchanan (GA)
12	FW	USA	Justin Rennicks (HGP)
14	FW	URU	Diego Fagúndez (HGP)
15	DF	USA	Brandon Bye
24	DF	USA	DeJuan Jones
17	FW	USA	Juan Agudelo
18	GK	USA	Brad Knighton
19	DF	SLO	Antonio Delamea Mlinar
21	MF	HAI	Zachary Herivaux (HGP)
22	MF	ESP	Carles Gil (Int)
23	MF	FRA	Wilfried Zahibo (Int)
27	MF	COL	Luis Caicedo (Int)
28	DF	ENG	Michael Mancienne (Int)
29	MF	BRA	Nicolas Firmino (HGP)
30	GK	USA	Matt Turner
70	FW	ECU	Cristian Penilla (Int)
7	FW	ARG	Gustavo Bou (Int)

=== Staff ===
Title	Name
President	Brian Bilello
Technical director	Curt Onalfo
Head coach & sporting director	Bruce Arena
Assistant coach	Richie Williams
Goalkeepers coach	Kevin Hitchcock
Director of scouting and player personnel	Remi Roy
Director of soccer operations	Jason Gove
Soccer operations coordinator	Tyler Fletcher
Equipment manager	Scott Emmens
Analyst	Tim Crawford
Team video coordinator	Todd Kingson
Head of fitness	Vacant
Head athletic trainer	Evan Allen
Assistant athletic trainer	Phil Madore

Last updated: March 30, 2019
Source: New England Revolution

== Transfers ==
=== In ===
Per Major League Soccer and club policies terms of the deals do not get disclosed.

No.	Pos.	Nat.	Name	Age	Moving from	Type	Transfer window	Ends	Transfer fee	Source
29	MF	(United States)	Nicolas Firmino	17	(United States) New England Revolution Academy	Home grown	Pre-season	Undisclosed		
12	FW	(United States)	Justin Rennicks	20	(United States) Indiana University	Home grown	Pre-season	Undisclosed		
8	DF	(United States)	Edgar Castillo	32	(United States) Colorado Rapids	Trade	Pre-season	Undisclosed		
9	FW	(Colombia)	Juan Fernando Caicedo	29	(Colombia) Independiente Medellin	On loan	Pre-season	Undisclosed		
27	MF	(Colombia)	Luis Caicedo	22	(Colombia) Cortuluá	Loan Purchase Option	Pre-season	Undisclosed	Undisclosed	
70	FW	(Ecuador)	Cristian Penilla	27	(Mexico) CF Pachuca	Loan Purchase Option	Pre-season	Undisclosed	Undisclosed	
11	FW	(Canada)	Tajon Buchanan	21	(United States) Syracuse University	Draft	Pre-season	Undisclosed		
22	FW	(Spain)	Carles Gil	26	(Spain) Deportivo La Coruña	Transfer	Pre-season	Undisclosed	2,000,000	
24	MF	(United States)	DeJuan Jones	21	(United States) Michigan State	Draft	Pre-season	Undisclosed		
7	FW	(Argentina)	Gustavo Bou	29	(Mexico) Club Tijuana	Transfer	Mid-season	Undisclosed	7,000,000	

=== Out ===
No.	Pos.	Nat.	Name	Age	Moving to	Type	Transfer window	Transfer fee	Source
4	DF	(France)	Claude Dielna	31	(United States) Portland Timbers	Option Declined	Pre-season		
25	MF	(Argentina)	Guillermo Hauche	25		Option Declined	Pre-season		
88	FW	(Benin)	Femi Hollinger-Janzen	25	(United States) Birmingham Legion FC	Option Declined	Pre-season		
13	MF	(Bolivia)	Cristhian Machado	28	(Bolivia) Royal Pari FC	Option declined	Pre-season		
12	DF	(Guatemala)	Nicolas Samayoa	23	(Guatemala) Comunicaciones F.C.	Option declined	Pre-season		
28	DF	(United States)	Mark Segbers	22	(United States) Swope Park Rangers	Option declined	Pre-season		
8	DF	(United States)	Chris Tierney	32		Retirement	Pre-season		
11	MF	(United States)	Kelyn Rowe	27	(United States) Sporting Kansas City	Trade	Pre-season		
91	DF	(Syria)	Gabriel Somi	27		Mutual Agreement	mid-season		

== Matches and Results ==
=== Exhibitions ===
January 31, 2019 Preseason	New England Revolution	0–0	Shanghai Shenhua F.C.	Marbella, Spain
09:00 EST		Report	Li Xiaoming (yellow card) 72'	Stadium: Marbella Football Center

February 1, 2019 Preseason	New England Revolution	2–2	Viktoria Plzeň	Marbella, Spain
09:00 EST	Penilla 35'; Wright 73'	Report	Beauguel 82'; Bucha 85'	Stadium: Marbella Football Center

February 3, 2019 Preseason	New England Revolution	0–2	Krasnodar	Marbella, Spain
09:00 EST	Fagundez (yellow card) 55'	Report	Ignatyev 50'; Suleymanov 78'	Stadium: Marbella Football Center

February 6, 2019 Preseason	New England Revolution	3–1	FC Dynamo Kyiv	Marbella, Spain
09:00 EST	Agudelo 54'; Gil 68'; Fagúndez 87'		33'	Stadium: Marbella Football Center

February 14, 2018 Preseason	New England Revolution	1–3	Louisville City FC	Bradenton, Florida
15:00 EST	Caicedo (yellow card) 47'; Anibaba (yellow card) 50'; Rennicks 68'; Zahibo (yellow card) 77'	Report	Williams 3'; McCabe 29'; Rasmussen 65'; Jane (yellow card) 85'	Stadium: IMG Academy

February 16, 2019 Preseason	New England Revolution	0–1	Minnesota United FC	Orlando, Florida
16:50 EST	Caicedo (yellow card) 38'	Report	Ibarra 67'; Alonso (yellow card) 68'	Stadium: Orlando City Stadium

February 20, 2019 Preseason	Orlando City SC	6–2	New England Revolution	Orlando, Florida
19:30 EST	Rosell 29' (pen.), (yellow card) 63'; Bye 32' (o.g.); Colmán 47'; Patiño 49'; Higuita 51'; Powers 56' (pen.)	Report	Penilla (yellow card) 11'; Turner (yellow card) 55'; Buchanan (yellow card) 60'; Bunbury 81', 90'	Stadium: Orlando City Stadium

February 21, 2019 Preseason	Greenville Triumph	1–4	New England Revolution	Bradenton, Florida
19:30 EST	12'	Report	Fagundez 16'; Wright (yellow card) 66', (goal) 76'; Trialist 68'; Penilla 72'	Stadium: IMG Academy
Note: 80-minute scrimmage

February 23, 2019 Preseason	New England Revolution	2–1	KR Reykjavik	Bradenton, Florida
15:00 EST	Penilla 11' (pen.); Delamea (yellow card) 60'; L. Caicedo 84'	Report	Aðalsteinsson (yellow card) 5'; Bjerregaard 70'	Stadium: IMG Academy

May 15, 2019 Midseason	New England Revolution	0–3	Chelsea F.C.	Foxborough, Massachusetts
20:00 EST		Report	Barkley 3' 62'; Giroud 29'	Stadium: Gillette Stadium; Attendance: 27,329; Referee: Nima Saghafi

=== MLS ===
March 2, 2019 1	FC Dallas	1–1	New England Revolution	Frisco, Texas
16:30 EST	Barrios 13'; Ziegler (yellow card) 56'; Badji (yellow card) 71'	Report	Gil 57'; Zahibo (yellow card) 19'; Mlinar (yellow card) 70'	Stadium: Toyota Stadium; Attendance: 14,327; Referee: Ismail Elfath

March 9, 2019 2	New England Revolution	0–2	Columbus Crew	Foxborough, Massachusetts
14:00 EST	Zahibo (yellow card) 35'; Bye (yellow card) 86'	Report	Zardes 26', 90+6'; Trapp (yellow card) 36'; P. Santos (yellow card) 77'	Stadium: Gillette Stadium; Attendance: 13,808; Referee: David Gantar

March 17, 2019 3	Toronto FC	3–2	New England Revolution	Toronto, Ontario
19:30 EST	Akinola 14', (yellow card) 79'; Hamilton 45'; Altidore 80'	Report	Gil 9' (pen.), 52', (yellow card) 45+2'	Stadium: BMO Field; Attendance: 23,271; Referee: Ted Unkel

March 24, 2019 4	New England Revolution	0–2	FC Cincinnati	Foxborough, Massachusetts
16:00 EST	Mlinar (yellow card) 52'; Fagúndez (yellow card) 74'	Report	Manneh 44'; Saief 65'; Bertone (yellow card) 73'	Stadium: Gillette Stadium; Attendance: 10,605; Referee: Joseph Dickerson

March 30, 2019 5	New England Revolution	2–1	Minnesota United FC	Foxborough, Massachusetts
14:00 EST	Anibaba 10', (yellow card) 72'; Gil (yellow card) 45+2'; Bye 62'; Castillo (yellow card) 74'	Report	Opara (yellow card) 12'; Quintero 26'; Métanire (yellow card) 54'; Alonso (yellow card) 70'	Stadium: Gillette Stadium; Attendance: 10,657; Referee: Allen Chapman

April 6, 2019 6	Columbus Crew	1–0	New England Revolution	Columbus, Ohio
19:30 EST	Jonathan (yellow card) 20'; Jo. Williams 42'; Higuaín (yellow card) 54'	Report	Mancienne (yellow card) 9' (yellow-red card) 64'; Agudelo (yellow card) 45+1'	Stadium: Mapfre Stadium; Attendance: 10,942; Referee: Rubiel Vazquez

April 13, 2019 7	New England Revolution	0–2	Atlanta United FC	Foxborough, Massachusetts
19:30 EST	Penilla (yellow card) 53'; Anibaba (yellow card) 53'; Caldwell (yellow card) 89'	Report	Barco 29', 49'; Larentowicz (yellow card) 71'; Robinson (yellow card) 83'	Stadium: Gillette Stadium; Attendance: 15,016; Referee: Alex Chilowicz

April 20, 2019 8	New England Revolution	1–0	New York Red Bulls	Foxborough, Massachusetts
19:30 EST	Agudelo (yellow card) 52'; Penilla 73'	Report	Wright-Phillips (yellow card) 51'	Stadium: Gillette Stadium; Attendance: 14,514; Referee: Drew Fischer

April 24, 2019 9	New England Revolution	0–3	Montreal Impact	Foxborough, Massachusetts
19:30 EST	Caldwell (yellow card) 58'	Report	Piette (yellow card) 72'; Shome 79'; Jackson-Hamel 85', 90+3'	Stadium: Gillette Stadium; Attendance: 9422; Referee: Nima Saghafi

April 27, 2019 10	Sporting Kansas City	4–4	New England Revolution	Kansas City, Kansas
20:30 EST	Németh 33', (yellow card) 67', (goal) 83'; Rwatubyaye (yellow card) 41'; Gutierrez 60' (pen.), 70', (yellow card) 90+3'	Report	Caicedo 16', 35'; Agudelo 42'; Anibaba (yellow card) 43' (yellow-red card) 89'; Bye (yellow card) 45+1' (yellow-red card) 55'; Gil (yellow card) 49'; Jones 66'; Castillo (yellow card) 84'; Cropper (yellow card) 90+5'	Stadium: Children's Mercy Park; Attendance: 18,511; Referee: Baldomero Toledo

May 4, 2019 11	Philadelphia Union	6–1	New England Revolution	Chester, Pennsylvania
19:30 EST	Elliott 11', (yellow card) 24'; Ilsinho 47', (yellow card) 77'; Picault (yellow card) 63'; Santos 69', 74'; Przybylko 82'; Accam 88'	Report	Caicedo (yellow card) 13', (goal) 35'	Stadium: Talen Energy Stadium; Attendance: 15,565; Referee: Joseph Dickerson

May 8, 2019 12	Chicago Fire	5–0	New England Revolution	Bridgeview, Illinois
20:00 EST	Nikolić 28', 40'; Kappelhof (yellow card) 55'; Bronico 78'; Gaitán 85'; Frankowski 89'		Caicedo (yellow card) 58'	Stadium: SeatGeek Stadium; Attendance: 6,074; Referee: Timothy Ford

May 11, 2019 13	New England Revolution	3–1	San Jose Earthquakes	Foxborough, Massachusetts
19:30 EST	Agudelo 18'; Penilla 29' (pen.); Gil 68'; Turner (yellow card) 90+5'	Report	Cummings (yellow card) 25'; Qazaishvili 88'	Stadium: Gillette Stadium; Attendance: 20,610; Referee: Guido Gonzales, Jr.

May 18, 2019 14	Montreal Impact	0–0	New England Revolution	Montreal, Quebec
13:00 EDT	Piatti (yellow card) 79'; Shome (yellow card) 82'; Brault-Guillard (yellow card) 89'; Piette (yellow card) 90+5'	Report	Caicedo (yellow card) 21'; Farrell (yellow card) 56'; Agudelo (yellow card) 66'	Stadium: Stade Saputo; Attendance: 15,559; Referee: Ramy Touchan

May 25, 2019 15	New England Revolution	1–1	D.C. United	Foxborough, Massachusetts
19:30 EST	Penilla (yellow card) 45'; Farrell (yellow card) 53'; Turner (red card) 56'; Agudelo 61'; Bunbury (yellow card) 65'	Report	Rooney 90' (pen.)	Stadium: Gillette Stadium; Attendance: 20,131; Referee: David Gantar

June 2, 2019 16	LA Galaxy	1–2	New England Revolution	Carson, California
22:30 EST	Ibrahimović (yellow card) 24', (goal) 84'; F. Álvarez (yellow card) 73'	Report	Penilla 45'; Bunbury 60'; Agudelo (yellow card) 90'	Stadium: Dignity Health Sports Park; Attendance: 20,828; Referee: Alex Chilowicz

June 26, 2019 17	New England Revolution	1–1	Philadelphia Union	Foxborough, Massachusetts
19:00 EST	Bye 31'; Gil (yellow card) 33'; Bunbury (yellow card) 61'	Report	Aaronson (yellow card) 11'; Trusty (yellow card) 28'; Medunjanin (yellow card) 45'; Wagner (yellow card) 65'; Przybylko 84'	Stadium: Gillette Stadium; Attendance: 11,571; Referee: Nima Saghafi

June 29, 2019 18	New England Revolution	2–1	Houston Dynamo	Foxborough, Massachusetts
19:30 EST	Mlinar (yellow card) 45', (goal) 52'; Farrell (yellow card) 54'; Agudelo (yellow card) 83'; Bunbury 90'	Report	Cerén 25'; Quioto (yellow card) 43'; Cabezas (yellow card) 81'; Fuenmayor (yellow card) 85'	Stadium: Gillette Stadium; Attendance: 17,372; Referee: Silviu Petrescu

July 4, 2019 19	Colorado Rapids	1–2	New England Revolution	Commerce City, Colorado
21:00 EST	Wilson (yellow card) 36'; Vines (yellow card) 54'; Rubio 71'; Smith (yellow card) 72'; Abubakar (yellow card) 81'; Acosta (yellow card) 90+1' (yellow-red card) 90+1'	Report	Bunbury 8'; Bye (yellow card) 40'; Caicedo 52'; Turner (yellow card) 71'; Mlinar (yellow card) 78'	Stadium: Dick's Sporting Goods Park; Attendance: 15,584; Referee: Alex Chilowicz

July 12, 2019 20	D.C. United	2–2	New England Revolution	Washington, D.C.
19:00 EST	Jara (yellow card) 37', (goal) 43'; Arriola (yellow card) 40'; Birnbaum (yellow card) 67'; Amarikwa 86'	Report	Bunbury 4'; J. Caicedo (yellow card) 23'; Gil 32'; Zahibo (yellow card) 49' (yellow-red card) 63'; L. Caicedo (yellow card) 81'; Turner (yellow card) 83'	Stadium: Audi Field; Attendance: 18,903; Referee: Ted Unkel

July 17, 2019 21	New England Revolution	4–0	Vancouver Whitecaps FC	Foxborough, Massachusetts
19:00 EST	Bou 45+1'; Caicedo (yellow card) 71'; Farrell (yellow card) 77'; Fagundez 82'; Gil 86'; Bunbury 90'	Report	Godoy (yellow card) 49'; Cornelius (yellow card) 58'	Stadium: Gillette Stadium; Attendance: 10,575; Referee: Robert Sibiga

July 21, 2019 22	FC Cincinnati	0–2	New England Revolution	Cincinnati, Ohio
6:00PM EDT	Cruz (yellow card) 54'	Report	Gil 9'; Delamea 55'	Stadium: Nippert Stadium; Attendance: 25,095; Referee: Kevin Stott

July 27, 2019 23	New England Revolution	4–1	Orlando City SC	Foxborough, Massachusetts
20:00	Bou 3'; Penilla 46'; Gil 60' (pen.); Bye (yellow card) 67'; Fagundez 75'	Report	Méndez (yellow card) 27'; Rosell (yellow card) 36'; Akindele 77'	Stadium: Gillette Stadium; Attendance: 19,043; Referee: Alan Kelly

August 3, 2019 24	New England Revolution	0–2	LAFC	Foxborough, Massachusetts
19:30 EST	Zahibo (yellow card) 74'	Report	Rossi 8'; Zimmerman (yellow card) 66'; Blessing 72'	Stadium: Gillette Stadium; Attendance: 25,515; Referee: Rubiel Vazquez

August 10, 2019 25	Seattle Sounders FC	3–3	New England Revolution	Seattle, Washington
16:00 EST	Shipp 2' 65'; Lodeiro 66'; Kim Kee-hee (yellow card) 89'	Report	Michael Mancienne 27' (yellow card) 54'; Bou 35'; Andrew Farrell (yellow card) 46'; Carles Gil 87' (pen.)	Stadium: CenturyLink Field; Attendance: 38,826; Referee: David Gantar

August 17, 2019 26	New York Red Bulls	1–1	New England Revolution	Harrison, New Jersey
19:00 EST	Rzatkowski 18'	Report	Bou 65'	Stadium: Red Bull Arena; Attendance: 18,177; Referee: Chris Penso

August 24, 2019 27	New England Revolution	2–1	Chicago Fire	Foxborough, Massachusetts
19:30 EST	Zahibo 17'; Mancienne (yellow card) 30'; Bou 86' (yellow card) 87'	Report	Gaitán (yellow card) 1'; Calvo 41'; Azira (yellow card) 90+1'	Stadium: Gillette Stadium; Attendance: 16,236; Referee: Alex Chilowicz

August 31, 2019 28	New England Revolution	1–1	Toronto FC	Foxborough, Massachusetts
19:30 EST	Farrell (yellow card) 37'; Bou 86'	Report	Mavinga (yellow card) 57'; Benezet 74'	Stadium: Gillette Stadium; Attendance: 16,588; Referee: Timothy Ford

September 7, 2019 29	NYCFC	2–1	New England Revolution	New York, New York
15:30 EST	Moralez (yellow card) 10'; Ibeagha (yellow card) 22'; Parks (yellow card) 42'; Medina 70' 90+6'; Ring (yellow card) 88'		J. Caicedo 2'; Delamea (red card) 9'; Farrell (yellow card) 71'; Turner (yellow card) 74'; Zahibo (yellow card) 81'; Agudelo (yellow card) 89'; Gil (yellow card) 90+6'	Stadium: Yankee Stadium; Attendance: 21,236; Referee: Silviu Petrescu

September 14, 2019 30	Orlando City SC	3–3	New England Revolution	Orlando, Florida
19:30 EST	Smith (yellow card) 15'; Nani 22', 54'; Dwyer 47'; Jansson (yellow card) 60'; Higuita (yellow card) 88'	Report	Akindele 15' (o.g.); Penilla 35'; Bou 41'; Delamea (yellow card) 90'	Stadium: Orlando City Stadium; Attendance: 22,419; Referee: Fotis Bazakos

September 21, 2019 31	New England Revolution	0–0	Real Salt Lake	Foxborough, Massachusetts
19:30 EST	Delamea (yellow card) 46'	Report	Putna (yellow card) 87'	Stadium: Gillette Stadium; Attendance: 24,270; Referee: Armando Villarreal

September 25, 2019 32	Portland Timbers	2–2	New England Revolution	Portland, Oregon
22:30 EST	Ebobisse 49', 81'; Mabiala (yellow card) 88'; Blanco (yellow card) 90+8'	Report	Mancienne (yellow card) 67'; Fagundez (yellow card) 68'; Bou 87'; Gil 90+7' (pen.)	Stadium: Providence Park; Attendance: 25,218; Referee: Ramy Touchan

September 29, 2019 33	New England Revolution	2–0	NYCFC	Foxborough, Massachusetts
17:00 EST	Bye (yellow card) 61'; Bunbury 66'; Bou 89'	Report	Callens (yellow card) 82'	Stadium: Gillette Stadium; Attendance: 28,602; Referee: Nima Saghafi

October 6, 2019 34	Atlanta United FC	3–1	New England Revolution	Atlanta, Georgia
16:00 EST	Nagbe 3'; J. Martínez 49'; Gressel 57'	Report	Penilla 8'; Caicedo (yellow card) 14'; Zahibo (yellow card) 83'	Stadium: Mercedes-Benz Stadium; Attendance: 44,617; Referee: Ismail Elfath

=== U.S. Open Cup ===
The Revolution will enter the 2019 U.S. Open Cup with the rest of Major League Soccer in the fourth round.

June 11 Fourth Round	New York Red Bulls (New York (state))	2–3 (a.e.t.)	(Massachusetts) New England Revolution	Montclair, New Jersey
7:30PM EDT	Barlow 19'; Cásseres 54'; Muyl (penalty missed) 67'; Tarek (yellow card) 104'	Report	Agudelo 2'; Caicedo (yellow card) 41' (yellow-red card) 90+5'; Bunbury 85', 109'	Stadium: MSU Soccer Park; Attendance: 2,185; Referee: Rosendo Mendoza

June 19 Round of 16	Orlando City SC (Florida)	2–1 (a.e.t.)	(Massachusetts) New England Revolution	Orlando, Florida
7:30 PM EDT	Michel 96', (yellow card) 119'; Akindele 101'; Klještan (yellow card) 105+1'; DeJohn (yellow card) 120+4'	Report	Agudelo (yellow card) 95'; Castillo (yellow card) 115'; Rennicks 117'	Stadium: Exploria Stadium; Attendance: 5,556; Referee: Marcos de Oliveira
