= 2019 Orlando City SC season =

Season of American association football team

Orlando City SC
2019 season
- CEO: Alex Leitão
- Manager: James O'Connor
- Stadium: Exploria Stadium
- MLS: Conference: 11th Overall: 22nd
- MLS Cup Playoffs: Did not qualify
- U.S. Open Cup: Semi-final
- Top goalscorer: League: Nani (12); All: Nani (12)
- Highest home attendance: MLS: 25,527 (March 2 vs. NYCFC)
- Lowest home attendance: MLS: 22,341 (May 19 vs. FC Cincinnati); All: 5,556 (June 19 vs. New England Revolution, USOC)
- Average home league attendance: 22,761
- Biggest win: ORL 5–1 CIN (May 19)
- Biggest defeat: NE 4–1 ORL (July 27); SJ 3–0 ORL (Aug. 31); ORL 2–5 CHI (Oct. 6)
Home colors	Away colors

The 2019 Orlando City SC season was the club's ninth season of existence in Orlando and fifth season in Major League Soccer, the top-flight league in the United States soccer league system. Alongside Major League Soccer, the club also competed in the U.S. Open Cup, reaching the semi-finals for the first time.

== Season review ==
=== Pre-season ===
During the offseason, Orlando City parted ways with General Manager Niki Budalić who had been at the club since January 2016 and held the role of GM for two years. He was replaced in the role by FC Dallas vice president of soccer operations Luiz Muzzi. The day after Budalić departed, the club announced that a total of nine players were out of contract, most notably captain Jonathon Spector marking the second consecutive season the team's captain had left following Kaká's retirement a year earlier.

The club undertook its second major roster rebuild in as many years during James O'Connor's first winter transfer window in Orlando. By the end of December the team had already sold Amro Tarek, Mohamed El Monir and Yoshimar Yotún who had all featured in major roles in 2018 while bringing in two of O'Connor's former Louisville City players Greg Ranjitsingh and Kyle Smith from USL, as well as Ecuador international Sebas Méndez.

Benji Michel was signed to a Homegrown deal, becoming the club's fifth homegrown player; the first to be born in Orlando and come up through the Development Academy. The team also tried to sign Santiago Patiño to a Homegrown contract but the move was controversially blocked by MLS. Luiz Muzzi continued to argue the case throughout the Combine and events leading up to the SuperDraft stating "We feel like the league did us wrong on this one." Orlando eventually decided to draft him with their #3 overall pick with O'Connor describing the selection as "a message to all our other homegrowns."

Orlando announced six preseason matches for 2019 including the inaugural iteration of the OC Invitational, a preseason friendly tournament that would feature New York City FC, New England Revolution and Minnesota United FC with each team facing two of the other three participants. It marked only the second time that the club would play preseason games open to the public following a friendly against Bahia in February 2016. The Lions lifted the OC Invitational trophy after winning both of their games against New York City FC and New England Revolution. Minnesota United FC would finish on the same record but with worse goal difference.

On February 18, Orlando unveiled Portuguese international winger Nani as a Designated Player, joining on a free transfer from Sporting CP.

=== March ===
Orlando's fifth MLS campaign began at home to New York City FC on March 2, marking the third time the two 2015 expansion teams faced each other on opening weekend. The game finished 2–2 after the Lions trailed 2–0 at the break thanks to goals by Mueller and debutant Akindele. The result meant Orlando remained unbeaten on matchday one since joining MLS. The following week Orlando traveled to Chicago for their first road game of the season. The game ended 1–1 when C.J. Sapong equalized for 10-man Fire in the final minute. It marked the first time since April 29, 2018 that Orlando had earned any points away from home. The first defeat of the season came in week three as Orlando lost 3–1 to Montreal Impact at home. Ignacio Piatti scored a brace to take his all-time individual total against the Lions to 10 goals in 10 games, the most of any single player against Orlando in MLS while Orlando City goalkeeper Brian Rowe was forced into a career-high eight saves. The following week, Orlando went to reigning Supporters' Shield winners New York Red Bulls and got their first win of the season. Former Red Bulls captain Sacha Kljestan scored the only goal of the game as the Lions got their first road win since April 29, 2018, the first of James O'Connor's reign, and also kept their first clean sheet on the road since April 13, 2018. The month ended with a 2–1 defeat to D.C. United. The result followed a series of controversial calls on the Rooney goal including a phantom foul, incorrect ball placement and impeding of the Orlando goalkeeper, none of which were called or looked at by VAR and led to a post-match tirade by O'Connor who slammed the officiating.

=== April ===
On April 6, Orlando earned their first home win of the season. Designated player Nani scored his first goals for the club including an 89th-minute penalty to secure a 4–3 win over Colorado Rapids following a lengthy lightning delay at half-time. Orlando's first away loss of the season was on April 13 when they fell 2–1 to Real Salt Lake. It was the first time in the teams' five meetings that RSL had won. In their next game, Orlando earned their first ever victory over Vancouver Whitecaps FC with Nani deflecting in a late 88th-minute winner. Orlando's final game in April was the reverse fixture of the season opener against NYCFC, ending in another draw like the first meeting. Nani scored in his fourth consecutive game to equal Dom Dwyer's club record goal streak set in April 2018.

=== May ===
On May 2, MLS officially announced Atlético Madrid as the opposition for the 2019 MLS All-Star Game set to be hosted by Orlando City SC at Orlando City Stadium on July 31. On May 4, the team were held scoreless for the first time on the year in a 2–0 home defeat to Toronto FC. They had their second consecutive shutout loss a week later against Atlanta. On May 19, Orlando played new expansion side FC Cincinnati for the first time, beating them 5–1. It was the first time since May 6, 2018 that Orlando had won a game by more than one goal. The team ended with a frustrating 1–0 defeat to LA Galaxy having out-shot the visitors 19–4. On May 29, the team announced plans to move all of Orlando City's development pyramid to one single site, creating a new 20-acre state-of-the-art training complex at Osceola Heritage Park to house the senior team as well as OCB and the Development Academy.

=== June ===
On June 1, Orlando opened the month with a 3–0 victory away to Montreal Impact, the team's first road win by multiple goals since April 13, 2018 when the Lions earned a 2–0 win over Philadelphia Union. On June 4, Orlando City held a press conference to announce the sale of the stadium's naming rights to Florida-based time share and vacation rental company Exploria Resorts. As a result, the stadium was renamed Exploria Stadium. On June 12, the team won their opening U.S. Open Cup game of the year 3–1 over USL Championship side Memphis 901, to progress to the Round of 16. The game was notable for Robin Jansson's first goal as a Lion. The following week, Orlando booked their place in the quarter-finals with a 2–1 victory after extra-time over fellow MLS side New England Revolution. On June 26, Orlando played their first league game since June 1 following two Open Cup matches. They lost 1–0 to D.C. United after Wayne Rooney scored from within his own half. The team's final game of June was away to Columbus Crew, a 2–0 victory to give the team their first winning record in June since their inaugural season in MLS.

=== July ===
July opened with back to back games against Philadelphia Union home and away. On July 3, Orlando lost 3–1 at home with Jansson and Kljestan both receiving red cards during the game. The away match was originally scheduled for July 6 but a pre-match adverse weather delay due to lightning storms turned into a full postponement with MLS rescheduling the game for the next day - a decision that was not received well by Orlando City as it not only impacted the team's U.S. Open Cup quarter-final preparations but there were also three major international tournament finals on that day: Women's World Cup, Copa América and Gold Cup. Orlando would go on to draw the game 2–2, conceding a late equalizer to Kacper Przybyłko who had scored twice against the Lions earlier in the week. Following the game, an issue with the rescheduled travel arrangements meant the squad ended up stuck in Philadelphia for an additional second day. On July 10, Orlando City progressed to their first ever U.S. Open Cup semi-final, beating New York City FC on penalties after a 1–1 draw with Maxi Moralez scoring a 90+6-minute equalizer to send the game into extra-time. Adam Grinwis made two saves in the shoot-out. The game received viral media coverage for what became known as "The Running of The Wall." When NYCFC won the coin toss and elected to kick the penalties in front of an empty South Stand, the opposite side of the stadium to The Wall where the Orlando City supporters were housed, the Orlando fans took it upon themselves to run en masse down the length of the concourse and fill up the stand directly behind the goal the penalties were being taken. Three days later, Orlando hosted Columbus Crew in the league, winning 1–0 courtesy of late Benji Michel goal, his first in MLS. However, the team ended July with a run of three games without a win, taking a point on the road in a 1–1 draw to Portland Timbers before defeats to New York Red Bulls and New England Revolution.

Orlando hosted 2019 MLS All-Star week at the end of July. On July 29, Orlando City's eMLS professional FIFA player FIFA Abe, alongside guest player AnthFifa, won the eMLS All-Star Challenge that also featured Landon Donovan and Diego Forlán. The victory earned $5,000 for the Orlando City foundation. On July 30, MLS debuted a new skills challenge event, pitting three teams composed of All-Stars (Wayne Rooney, Jonathan dos Santos and Carlos Vela), Atlético Madrid players (Koke, Héctor Herrera and João Félix) as well as players from Orlando City (Nani, Sebas Méndez and Chris Mueller) against each other in a series of games created by F2Freestylers. The event, held at the ESPN Wide World of Sports Complex, was won by the Orlando City team after Nani hit the crossbar with the last kick of the competition, winning an additional $25,000 for the Orlando City Foundation. Nani was Orlando City's sole representative in the All-Star Game, coached by James O'Connor and won 3–0 by Atlético, while Benji Michel and Mason Stajduhar both featured in the 2019 MLS Homegrown Game.

=== August ===
Orlando went on their longest unbeaten run in the league during August, avoiding defeat in four games. On August 3, Orlando returned to MLS action to record the team's first ever win over FC Dallas. Former Dallas player Tesho Akindele opened the scoring in his first appearance against the team following a move in the offseason before Carlos Ascues scored his first goal as a Lion since joining in 2018. On August 10, the team earned a 1–1 draw against Toronto FC before returning to Orlando for a midweek game against Sporting Kansas City, winning 1–0. On August 17, Orlando visited Allianz Field for the first time to play Minnesota United FC, coached by former Orlando head coach Adrian Heath. Minnesota scored a stoppage time equalizer in the 1–1 draw after a Nani penalty had put Orlando ahead. At the end of the gameweek, Orlando had moved back up to eight place in the conference. However, two shutout losses to Atlanta United FC and San Jose Earthquakes to end August saw the team drop back down to ninth.

=== September ===
On September 7, Orlando City hosted Los Angeles FC who remained 11 points clear at the top of the Supporters' Shield standings, earning a point in a 2–2 draw despite again leading late in the second half. On September 14, with only four games left in the season, Orlando faced playoff rivals New England Revolution who were four points ahead of Orlando and occupying the final playoff spot heading into the game. Despite trailing 3–1 at halftime, Orlando fought back to score two unanswered goals and earn a 3–3 draw. Nani was involved in every goal, scoring twice and registering one assist to set a new team record in single-season goal involvements with 21. However, a win for Chicago Fire pushed Orlando down to tenth while they still remained four points behind New England. On September 21, Orlando traveled to face Houston Dynamo. Having taken the lead through a sixth minute Dwyer goal, their earliest goal of the season, Orlando had the potential to move back up the eighth and back within two points of the playoffs were they to hold on to the lead as both New England and Chicago had tied in their earlier matches. However, two unanswered second half goals for Houston meant Orlando lost 2–1, keeping them in tenth. On September 29, Orlando's final away game of the season and the team's first trip to FC Cincinnati, ended in a 1–1 draw. The result, coupled with New England's victory over NYCFC, officially eliminated the team from playoff contention with one regular season game left. Benji Michel's goal was the 75th goal FC Cincinnati had conceded in 2019. It broke the MLS record for most goals conceded in a single season set the previous year by Orlando City.

=== October ===
Orlando City had the opportunity to leapfrog Chicago Fire on the final day of the season but lost 5–2 to Chicago at home, keeping the team 11th in the Eastern Conference, 22nd in the Supporters' Shield standings and taking their winless streak to eight to end the season. The following day the club announced they had parted ways with James O'Connor.

== Roster ==
Last updated on July 30, 2019

No.	Nationality	Name	Position(s)	Date of birth (age)	Previous club	Notes
Goalkeepers
18	(Trinidad and Tobago)	Greg Ranjitsingh	GK	July 18, 1993 (aged 25)	(United States) Louisville City	INT
23	(United States)	Brian Rowe	GK	November 16, 1988 (aged 30)	(Canada) Vancouver Whitecaps FC	–
99	(United States)	Adam Grinwis	GK	April 21, 1992 (aged 26)	(United States) Saint Louis FC	–
Defenders
2	(Brazil)	Ruan	RB	May 29, 1995 (aged 23)	(Brazil) Barra da Tijuca	Loan in, INT
3	(United States)	Alex DeJohn	CB	May 10, 1991 (aged 27)	(Sweden) Dalkurd FF	–
6	(Sweden)	Robin Jansson	CB	November 15, 1991 (aged 27)	(Sweden) AIK	INT
12	(United States)	Shane O'Neill	CB	September 2, 1993 (aged 25)	(Netherlands) Excelsior	HGP
22	(Senegal)	Lamine Sané	CB	March 22, 1987 (aged 31)	(Germany) Werder Bremen	INT
24	(United States)	Kyle Smith	RB	January 9, 1992 (aged 27)	(United States) Louisville City	–
25	(United States)	Danilo Acosta	LB	November 17, 1997 (aged 21)	(United States) Real Salt Lake	Loan in, HGP
27	(Canada)	Kamal Miller	CB	May 16, 1997 (aged 21)	(United States) Syracuse Orange	–
44	(Portugal)	João Moutinho	LB	January 12, 1998 (aged 21)	(United States) Los Angeles FC	GA
Midfielders
4	(Canada)	Will Johnson	CM	January 21, 1987 (aged 32)	(Canada) Toronto FC	–
5	(United States)	Dillon Powers	DM	February 14, 1991 (aged 28)	(United States) Colorado Rapids	–
7	(Colombia)	Cristian Higuita	CM	January 14, 1994 (aged 25)	(Colombia) Deportivo Cali	–
8	(Ecuador)	Sebas Méndez	DM	April 26, 1997 (aged 21)	(Ecuador) Independiente del Valle	INT
16	(United States)	Sacha Kljestan	AM	September 9, 1985 (aged 33)	(United States) New York Red Bulls	–
20	(Spain)	Uri Rosell	DM	July 7, 1992 (aged 26)	(Portugal) Sporting CP	–
26	(Peru)	Carlos Ascues	DM	June 19, 1992 (aged 26)	(Peru) Alianza Lima	Loan in, INT
33	(Uruguay)	Mauricio Pereyra	AM	March 15, 1990 (aged 28)	(Russia) FC Krasnodar	DP, INT
Forwards
9	(United States)	Chris Mueller	RW	August 29, 1996 (aged 22)	(United States) Wisconsin Badgers	–
13	(Canada)	Tesho Akindele	CF	March 31, 1992 (aged 26)	(United States) FC Dallas	–
14	(United States)	Dom Dwyer	CF	July 30, 1990 (aged 28)	(United States) Sporting KC	DP
17	(Portugal)	Nani (C)	LW	November 17, 1986 (aged 32)	(Portugal) Sporting CP	DP, INT
19	(United States)	Benji Michel	RW	October 23, 1997 (aged 21)	(United States) Portland Pilots	HGP
29	(Colombia)	Santiago Patiño	CF	March 10, 1997 (aged 21)	(United States) FIU Panthers	–
95	(Brazil)	Robinho	LW	January 19, 1995 (aged 24)	(United States) Columbus Crew	INT

== Staff ==
Executive
Majority owner and chairman	(Brazil) Flávio Augusto da Silva
Minor owner/Life president	(England) Phil Rawlins
Owner	(England) John Bonner
Chief executive officer	(Brazil) Alex Leitão
Executive VP of soccer operations	(Brazil) Luiz Muzzi
Coaching staff
Head coach	(Republic of Ireland) James O'Connor
Assistant coach	(United States) Daniel Byrd
Assistant coach	(Scotland) Sean McAuley
Goalkeeping coach	(Lesotho) Thabane Sutu
Academy coordinator	(Argentina) Marcelo Neveleff

== Competitions ==
=== Friendlies ===
Orlando City's 2019 preseason began on January 21 with a training camp at IMG Academy in Bradenton, Florida. They played a closed-door friendly at IMG against New York Red Bulls before traveling back to Orlando for closed-door friendlies against O'Connor's former team Louisville City FC and Philadelphia Union. The schedule concluded with two games in the inaugural OC Invitational that were open to the public and a third match against OC Invitational competitors Minnesota United FC that did not count towards the competition standings nor was it open to the public.

February 2	**Orlando City**	**1–1**	**New York Red Bulls**	Bradenton, Florida
10:30 am	Méndez (pen.)		Fernandez	Stadium: IMG Academy; Attendance: Closed-door

February 6	**Orlando City**	**1–0**	**Louisville City FC**	Orlando, Florida
4:00 pm	Moutinho			Stadium: Orlando City Stadium; Attendance: Closed-door
Note: James O'Connor faces his former team for the first time since leaving for Orlando

February 12	**Orlando City**	**1–4**	**Philadelphia Union**	Davenport, Florida
12:00 pm	Mueller		Burke; Santos (pen.); Sapong; Ngalina	Stadium: ChampionsGate Sports Complex; Attendance: Closed-door
Note: Additional 30mins played

February 16 OC Invitational	**Orlando City**	**2–1**	**New York City FC**	Orlando, Florida
7:30 pm	O'Neill (yellow card) 31'; Akindele 34'; Mueller 37'; Bender (yellow card) 89'		Moralez 30'; Medina (yellow card) 37'; Lewis (yellow card) 58' (yellow-red card) 75'; Castellanos (yellow card) 89'	Stadium: Orlando City Stadium

February 20 OC Invitational	**Orlando City**	**6–2**	**New England Revolution**	Orlando, Florida
7:30 pm	Rosell 29' (pen.); Bye 32' (o.g.); Colmán 47'; Patiño 49'; Higuita 51'; Powers 56' (pen.); Diouf (yellow card) 87'		Penilla (yellow card) 11'; Turner (yellow card) 55'; Bunbury 81', 90'	Stadium: Orlando City Stadium

February 23	**Orlando City**	–	**Minnesota United FC**	Orlando, Florida
12:00 pm				Stadium: Orlando City Stadium; Attendance: Closed-door
Note: Closed to the media, no official scoreline released

=== Major League Soccer ===
All times in regular season on Eastern Daylight Time (UTC−04:00) except where otherwise noted.

Outside of the club, FC Cincinnati joined the league as an expansion franchise, bringing the total number of MLS clubs to 24. Orlando City played FC Cincinnati for the first time on May 19, 2019, a 5–1 win. The team's first trip to Cincinnati will be on September 29, 2019.

With the addition of a 24th team, MLS was able to create a more balanced schedule in the sense that every team will play their conference opponents twice (home and away) and the 12 remaining teams in the opposite conference once to make up the 34-game schedule.

Results summary

Overall								Home						Away					
Pld	W	D	L	GF	GA	GD	Pts	W	D	L	GF	GA	GD	W	D	L	GF	GA	GD
34	9	10	15	44	52	−8	37	6	3	8	26	29	−3	3	7	7	18	23	−5

Source: Match reports

Round	1	2	3	4	5	6	7	8	9	10	11	12	13	14	15	16	17	18	19	20	21	22	23	24	25	26	27	28	29	30	31	32	33	34
Stadium	H	A	H	A	H	H	A	H	A	H	A	A	H	H	A	A	A	H	A	H	A	H	A	H	A	H	A	H	A	H	H	A	A	H
Result	D	D	L	W	L	W	L	W	D	L	L	L	W	L	W	L	W	L	D	W	D	L	L	W	D	W	D	L	L	D	D	L	D	L
Position (Note: ORL's position at the end of the matchweek, not their match.)	5	5	8	6	7	6	6	5	6	7	10	-	10	10	8	-	8	-	9	8	-	9	9	9	9	-	8	9	9	9	10	10	11	11

Updated to match(es) played on October 6, 2019. Source: Match reports
A = Away; H = Home; W = Win; D = Draw; L = Loss

Results

March 2 1	**Orlando City**	**2–2**	**New York City FC**	Orlando, Florida
2:30 pm	Méndez (yellow card) 9'; DeJohn (yellow card) 17'; Mueller 59'; Dwyer (yellow card) 73'; Akindele 75'	Report	Ofori 13'; Sweat (yellow card) 19'; Ring 45'; Chanot (yellow card) 56'	Stadium: Orlando City Stadium; Attendance: 25,527; Referee: Baldomero Toledo

March 9 2	**Chicago Fire**	**1–1**	**Orlando City**	Bridgeview, Illinois
1:00 pm	Mihailovic (yellow card) 45'; Corrales (red card) 64'; Schweinsteiger (yellow card) 90'; Sapong 90+5'	Report	Smith (yellow card) 34'; Dwyer 47'	Stadium: SeatGeek Stadium; Attendance: 11,041; Referee: Robert Sibiga

March 16 3	**Orlando City**	**1–3**	**Montreal Impact**	Orlando, Florida
4:00 pm	Rowe (yellow card) 16'; O'Neill (yellow card) 23'; Acosta (yellow card) 55'; Dwyer 90+1'; Higuita (yellow card) 90+7'	Report	Okwonkwo 14', (yellow card) 55'; Piatti 15', 80'; Azira (yellow card) 32'; Diallo (red card) 90+6'	Stadium: Orlando City Stadium; Attendance: 22,352; Referee: Tim Ford

March 23 4	**New York Red Bulls**	**0–1**	**Orlando City**	Harrison, New Jersey
7:00 pm	Muyl (yellow card) 90+6'	Report	Jansson (yellow card) 51'; Kljestan 73', (yellow card) 90+3'; Sané (yellow card) 78'	Stadium: Red Bull Arena; Attendance: 15,108; Referee: Allen Chapman

March 31 5	**Orlando City**	**1–2**	**D.C. United**	Orlando, Florida
6:30 pm	Sané (yellow card) 29'; Dwyer 63'	Report	Birnbaum 6'; Rooney 30'; Brillant (yellow card) 67'	Stadium: Orlando City Stadium; Attendance: 22,481; Referee: Armando Villarreal

April 6 6	**Orlando City**	**4–3**	**Colorado Rapids**	Orlando, Florida
7:30 pm	Nani 31', 89' (pen.); Akindele 33'; Mueller 81'	Report	Kamara 9', (yellow card) 39'; Mezquida 61'; Bassett 71'	Stadium: Orlando City Stadium; Attendance: 22,450; Referee: Jair Marrufo
Note: Second half delayed one hour for inclement weather

April 13 7	**Real Salt Lake**	**2–1**	**Orlando City**	Sandy, Utah
9:00 pm	Johnson 17'; Onuoha (yellow card) 34'; Kreilach (yellow card) 41', (goal) 55'; Beckerman (yellow card) 74'	Report	O'Neill (yellow card) 45+1'; Dwyer (yellow card) 69'; Nani 81'; Johnson (yellow card) 90+1'	Stadium: Rio Tinto Stadium; Attendance: 16,770; Referee: Chris Penso

April 20 8	**Orlando City**	**1–0**	**Vancouver Whitecaps FC**	Orlando, Florida
3:00 pm	Nani (yellow card) 62', (goal) 88'	Report	Cornelius (yellow card) 90'; Lass (yellow card) 90+3'	Stadium: Orlando City Stadium; Attendance: 22,468; Referee: Alan Kelly
Note: Adidas Parley kits worn by all teams in MLS this weekend

April 27 9	**New York City FC**	**1–1**	**Orlando City**	New York, New York
1:00 pm	Héber 51'; Sweat (yellow card) 53'	Report	Nani 18'; Rosell (yellow card) 71'; Jansson (yellow card) 85'; Dwyer (yellow card) 85'	Stadium: Yankee Stadium; Attendance: 20,862; Referee: Drew Fischer

May 4 10	**Orlando City**	**0–2**	**Toronto FC**	Orlando, Florida
4:00 pm		Report	Osorio 65'; Chapman 77'	Stadium: Orlando City Stadium; Attendance: 22,377; Referee: Robert Sibiga

May 12 11	**Atlanta United FC**	**1–0**	**Orlando City**	Atlanta, Georgia
2:30 pm	P. Martínez 14'; Parkhurst (yellow card) 65'	Report	Jansson (yellow card) 90'	Stadium: Mercedes-Benz Stadium; Attendance: 68,152; Referee: Rubiel Vazquez

May 15 12	**Seattle Sounders FC**	**2–1**	**Orlando City**	Seattle, Washington
10:30 pm	Ruidíaz 19'; Bwana 68'	Report	Mueller 75'; Dwyer (yellow card) 79'; Rosell (yellow card) 89'	Stadium: CenturyLink Field; Attendance: 37,722; Referee: Dave Gantar

May 19 13	**Orlando City**	**5–1**	**FC Cincinnati**	Orlando, Florida
3:00 pm	Akindele 37', 64'; Johnson (yellow card) 43'; Méndez (yellow card) 45+4'; Nani 50' (pen.), 59'; Dwyer (yellow card) 74', (goal) 82'	Report	Mattocks 24'; Powell (yellow card) 45+6'; Ulloa (yellow card) 74'; Amaya (yellow card) 75'; Ledesma (yellow card) 87'	Stadium: Orlando City Stadium; Attendance: 22,341; Referee: Nima Saghafi
Note: First ever meeting between the two clubs

May 24 14	**Orlando City**	**0–1**	**LA Galaxy**	Orlando, Florida
8:00 pm	Jansson (yellow card) 86'	Report	Cuello (yellow card) 17'; dos Santos 19'; González (yellow card) 45+1'; Corona (yellow card) 87'	Stadium: Orlando City Stadium; Attendance: 24,712; Referee: Allen Chapman

June 1 15	**Montreal Impact**	**0–3**	**Orlando City**	Montreal, Quebec, Canada
5:00 pm	Urruti (yellow card) 45'	Report	Nani 27' (pen.); Akindele 36'; Johnson 42'; Moutinho (yellow card) 49'	Stadium: Saputo Stadium; Attendance: 17,018; Referee: Chris Penso

June 26 16	**D.C. United**	**1–0**	**Orlando City**	Washington, D.C.
8:00 pm	Rooney 10'; Rodríguez (yellow card) 90'	Report	Ruan (yellow card) 27'; Kljestan (yellow card) 89'	Stadium: Audi Field; Attendance: 17,398; Referee: Alex Chilowicz

June 29 17	**Columbus Crew**	**0–2**	**Orlando City**	Columbus, Ohio
7:30 pm	Crognale (yellow card) 82'	Report	Smith (yellow card) 15'; Mueller 41'; Kljestan (yellow card) 63'; Akindele 66'; Ascues (yellow card) 87'	Stadium: Mapfre Stadium; Attendance: 17,715; Referee: Rubiel Vazquez

July 3 18	**Orlando City**	**1–3**	**Philadelphia Union**	Orlando, Florida
7:30 pm	Mueller 8'; Jansson (red card) 45'; Kljestan (red card) 67'	Report	Medunjanin (yellow card) 26'; Przybyłko 32', 47'; Picault 52'; Wagner (yellow card) 90+1'	Stadium: Exploria Stadium; Attendance: 22,364; Referee: Chris Penso
Note: One hour delay to kickoff due to lightning

July 7 19	**Philadelphia Union**	**2–2**	**Orlando City**	Chester, Pennsylvania
4:30 pm	Fabián 4'; Przybyłko 90'; Real (yellow card) 90+3'	Report	Dwyer 67'; Patiño 81'	Stadium: Talen Energy Stadium; Attendance: 18,574; Referee: Robert Sibiga
Note: Match rescheduled from July 6 due to weather

July 13 20	**Orlando City**	**1–0**	**Columbus Crew**	Orlando, Florida
7:30 pm	Miller (yellow card) 56'; Sané (yellow card) 58'; Ascues (yellow card) 81'; Michel 84'; Méndez (yellow card) 90+2'; Dwyer (red card) 90+3'	Report		Stadium: Exploria Stadium; Attendance: 22,397; Referee: Dave Gantar

July 18 21	**Portland Timbers**	**1–1**	**Orlando City**	Portland, Oregon
10:00 pm	Fernández (yellow card) 9'; Mabiala (yellow card) 67'; Ebobisse 82'; Dielna (yellow card) 89'	Report	Patiño 44', (yellow card) 77'; Rosell (yellow card) 50'; Méndez (yellow card) 86'	Stadium: Providence Park; Attendance: 25,218; Referee: Joe Dickerson

July 21 22	**Orlando City**	**0–1**	**New York Red Bulls**	Orlando, Florida
7:30 pm	Mueller (yellow card) 28'	Report	Royer (yellow card) 23'; White 32'; Robles (yellow card) 83'	Stadium: Exploria Stadium; Attendance: 22,408; Referee: Armando Villarreal

July 27 23	**New England Revolution**	**4–1**	**Orlando City**	Foxborough, Massachusetts
7:00 pm	Bou 3'; Penilla 47'; Gil 60' (pen.); Bye (yellow card) 67'; Fagúndez 75'	Report	Méndez (yellow card) 27'; Rosell (yellow card) 36'; Akindele 77'	Stadium: Gillette Stadium; Attendance: 19,043; Referee: Alan Kelly

August 3 24	**Orlando City**	**2–0**	**FC Dallas**	Orlando, Florida
7:30 pm	Akindele 13'; Méndez (yellow card) 69'; Ascues 90+2'	Report	Ziegler (yellow card) 20'; Pomykal (yellow card) 39'; Servania (yellow card) 45'; Ferreira (yellow card) 81'	Stadium: Exploria Stadium; Attendance: 22,479; Referee: Silviu Petrescu

August 10 25	**Toronto FC**	**1–1**	**Orlando City**	Toronto, Ontario, Canada
7:30 pm	Delgado (yellow card) 34'; Mullins 77'	Report	Michel 69'; Sané (yellow card) 82'	Stadium: BMO Field; Referee: Kevin Stott

August 14 26	**Orlando City**	**1–0**	**Sporting Kansas City**	Orlando, Florida
7:30 pm	Akindele 21', (yellow card) 49'; Nani (yellow card) 37'	Report	Gutiérrez (yellow card) 37'; Martins (yellow card) 90'	Stadium: Exploria Stadium; Attendance: 22,347; Referee: Robert Sibiga

August 17 27	**Minnesota United FC**	**1–1**	**Orlando City**	Saint Paul, Minnesota
8:00 pm	Gregus (yellow card) 32'; Gasper (yellow card) 63'; Opara (yellow card) 70'; Danladi 90+2'	Report	Dwyer (yellow card) 57'; Nani 70' (pen.)	Stadium: Allianz Field; Attendance: 19,738; Referee: Jair Marrufo
Note: Orlando's first match at the newly-built Allianz Field

August 23 28	**Orlando City**	**0–1**	**Atlanta United FC**	Orlando, Florida
8:00 pm		Report	González Pírez (yellow card) 36'; J. Martínez 60'; Gressel (yellow card) 90+4'	Stadium: Exploria Stadium; Attendance: 23,014; Referee: Nima Saghafi

August 31 29	**San Jose Earthquakes**	**3–0**	**Orlando City**	San Jose, California
10:30 pm	Eriksson 3'; Wondolowski 20', 33'; López (yellow card) 63'	Report	Higuita (yellow card) 59'; Dwyer (yellow card) 65'; Rosell (yellow card) 90'	Stadium: Avaya Stadium; Attendance: 17,323; Referee: Silviu Petrescu

September 7 30	**Orlando City**	**2–2**	**Los Angeles FC**	Orlando, Florida
7:30 pm	Nani 13', (yellow card) 45+4'; Michel 20'; Higuita (yellow card) 45+1'; Rosell (yellow card) 60'	Report	Perez 12'; Blessing (yellow card) 59'; Rossi 78'	Stadium: Exploria Stadium; Attendance: 22,371; Referee: Alan Kelly
Note: LAFC's first visit to Orlando

September 14 31	**Orlando City**	**3–3**	**New England Revolution**	Orlando, Florida
7:30 pm	Smith (yellow card) 15'; Nani 22', 54'; Dwyer 47'; Jansson (yellow card) 60'; Higuita (yellow card) 88'	Report	Akindele 15' (o.g.); Penilla 35'; Bou 41'; Delamea (yellow card) 90'	Stadium: Exploria Stadium; Attendance: 22,419; Referee: Fotis Bazakos

September 21 32	**Houston Dynamo**	**2–1**	**Orlando City**	Houston, Texas
8:30 pm	Elis 70'; Ramirez 73'	Report	Dwyer 6'; Higuita (yellow card) 60'	Stadium: BBVA Compass Stadium; Attendance: 15,146; Referee: Rubiel Vazquez

September 29 33	**FC Cincinnati**	**1–1**	**Orlando City**	Cincinnati, Ohio
5:00 pm	Cruz 40', (yellow card) 45+3'	Report	Méndez (yellow card) 45'; Jansson (yellow card) 61'; Smith (yellow card) 89'; Michel 90+1'	Stadium: Nippert Stadium; Attendance: 25,652; Referee: Robert Sibiga
Note: Orlando's first ever away match at FC Cincinnati

October 6 34	**Orlando City**	**2–5**	**Chicago Fire**	Orlando, Florida
4:30 pm	Akindele 5'; Nani (yellow card) 45+1'; Michel 74'; Pereyra (yellow card) 83'	Report	Smith 17' (o.g.); Kappelhof (yellow card) 40'; Sapong 61'; Katai 63'; Frankowski 67', 87'; Herbers (yellow card) 76'; Calvo (yellow card) 78'	Stadium: Exploria Stadium; Attendance: 22,433; Referee: Pierre-Luc Lauziere
Note: Decision Day 2019; all matches start at 4:30 pm. EST

==== Standings ====
Eastern Conference table

2019 MLS Eastern Conference standings
Pos	Team	Pld	W	L	T	GF	GA	GD	Pts
8	Chicago Fire	34	10	12	12	55	47	+8	**42**
9	Montreal Impact	34	12	17	5	47	60	−13	**41**
10	Columbus Crew SC	34	10	16	8	39	47	−8	**38**
**11**	Orlando City SC	**34**	**9**	**15**	**10**	**44**	**52**	**−8**	**37**
12	FC Cincinnati	34	6	22	6	31	75	−44	**24**

Source: MLS
Rules for classification: 1) points; 2) total wins; 3) total goal differential; 4) total goals scored; 5) disciplinary points; 6) away goal differential; 7) away goals scored; 8) home goals scored; 9) home goal differential; 10) coin toss or drawing of lots.

Overall table

2019 MLS regular season standings
Pos	Team	Pld	W	L	T	GF	GA	GD	Pts
20	Columbus Crew SC	34	10	16	8	39	47	−8	**38**
21	Sporting Kansas City	34	10	16	8	49	67	−18	**38**
**22**	Orlando City SC	**34**	**9**	**15**	**10**	**44**	**52**	**−8**	**37**
23	Vancouver Whitecaps FC	34	8	16	10	37	59	−22	**34**
24	FC Cincinnati	34	6	22	6	31	75	−44	**24**

Source: MLS
Rules for classification: 1) points; 2) total wins; 3) total goal differential; 4) total goals scored; 5) disciplinary points; 6) away goals scored; 7) away goal differential; 8) coin toss or drawing of lots

=== U.S. Open Cup ===
Orlando City entered the U.S. Open Cup in the fourth round, having been drawn against USL Championship team Memphis 901 FC. As a result of being drawn first, Memphis were the designated host team. In the Round of 16, Orlando beat fellow MLS team New England Revolution in extra-time to set up a quarter-final against New York City FC. The team triumphed 5–4 in a penalty shootout after a Maxi Moralez stoppage time equalizer forced extra time with the game ending 1–1. It set up a meeting with Atlanta United FC in the team's first Open Cup semi-final in history but the Lions lost 2–0. The game set a new club attendance record for the competition.

Bracket

Fourth round June 11–12
USLC	Memphis 901 FC	1
**MLS**	**Orlando City SC**	**3**
MLS	New York Red Bulls	2
**MLS**	**New England Revolution**	**3***
**MLS**	**D.C. United**	**2***
MLS	Philadelphia Union	1
**MLS**	**New York City FC**	**4**
USLC	North Carolina FC	0
**MLS**	**Columbus Crew SC**	**1**
USLC	Pittsburgh Riverhounds	0
USLC	Charleston Battery	1
**MLS**	**Atlanta United FC**	**3***
**USLC**	**Saint Louis FC**	**2**
MLS	Chicago Fire	1
**MLS**	**FC Cincinnati**	**2***
USLC	Louisville City FC	1
**MLS**	**Houston Dynamo**	**3**
USLC	Austin Bold FC	2
**MLS**	**Minnesota United FC**	**4**
MLS	Sporting Kansas City	1
**MLS**	**FC Dallas**	**4**
USLC	OKC Energy FC	0
MLS	Colorado Rapids	2(2)
**USLC**	**New Mexico United**	**2(4)**
MLS	Real Salt Lake	0
**MLS**	**Los Angeles FC**	**3**
**MLS**	**San Jose Earthquakes**	**4**
USLC	Sacramento Republic FC	3
MLS	Seattle Sounders FC	1
**MLS**	**Portland Timbers**	**2**
**MLS**	**LA Galaxy**	**3**
NPSL	Orange County FC	0

Round of 16; June 18–20
**MLS**	**Orlando City SC**	**2***
MLS	New England Revolution	1
MLS	D.C. United	1
**MLS**	**New York City FC**	**2**
MLS	Columbus Crew SC	2
**MLS**	**Atlanta United FC**	**3**
**USLC**	**Saint Louis FC**	**1**
MLS	FC Cincinnati	0
MLS	Houston Dynamo	2
**MLS**	**Minnesota United FC**	**3**
MLS	FC Dallas	1
**USLC**	**New Mexico United**	**2**
**MLS**	**Los Angeles FC**	**3**
MLS	San Jose Earthquakes	1
**MLS**	**Portland Timbers**	**4**
MLS	LA Galaxy	0

Quarterfinals; July 10
**MLS**	**Orlando City SC**	**1(5)**
MLS	New York City FC	1(4)
**MLS**	**Atlanta United FC**	**2**
USLC	Saint Louis FC	0
**MLS**	**Minnesota United FC**	**6**
USLC	New Mexico United	1
MLS	Los Angeles FC	0
**MLS**	**Portland Timbers**	**1**

Semifinals; August 7
MLS	Orlando City SC	0
**MLS**	**Atlanta United FC**	**2**
**MLS**	**Minnesota United FC**	**2**
MLS	Portland Timbers	1

Final; August 27
**MLS**	**Atlanta United FC**	**2**
MLS	Minnesota United FC	1

- Host team listed first
- **Bold** = winner
- * = after extra time, ( ) = penalty shootout score

June 12 Fourth round	**Memphis 901 (Tennessee)**	**1–3**	**(Florida) Orlando City**	Memphis, Tennessee
8:30 pm EDT	Collier 50'; Bruch (yellow card) 60'	Report	Kljestan 38' (pen.), 55'; Jansson 71'	Stadium: Mike Rose Soccer Complex; Attendance: 3,088; Referee: Sergii Demianchuk

June 19 Round of 16	**Orlando City (Florida)**	**2–1** (a.e.t.)	**(Massachusetts) New England Revolution**	Orlando, Florida
7:30 pm EDT	Michel 96', (yellow card) 119'; Akindele 101'; Kljestan (yellow card) 105+1'; DeJohn (yellow card) 120+4'	Report	Agudelo (yellow card) 95'; Castillo (yellow card) 115'; Rennicks 117'	Stadium: Exploria Stadium; Attendance: 5,556; Referee: Marcos de Oliveira

July 10 Quarter-final	**Orlando City (Florida)**	**1–1** (a.e.t.) (**5–4** p)	**(New York (state)) New York City FC**	Orlando, Florida
7:30 pm EDT	Mueller 61'; Méndez (yellow card) 65'; Michel (yellow card) 113'	Report	Ibeagha (yellow card) 38'; Castellanos (yellow card) 82'; Chanot (yellow card) 90+2'; Moralez 90+6'; Tinnerholm (yellow card) 95'	Stadium: Exploria Stadium; Attendance: 7,227; Referee: Victor Rivas
	**Penalties**
	Akindele (penalty scored); Smith (penalty scored); Dwyer (penalty missed); Johnson (penalty scored); Powers (penalty scored); Rosell (penalty scored)		(penalty missed) Ring; (penalty scored) Castellanos; (penalty scored) Tinnerholm; (penalty scored) Parks; (penalty scored) Medina; (penalty missed) Chanot

August 6 Semi-final	**Orlando City (Florida)**	**0–2**	**(Georgia (U.S. state)) Atlanta United FC**	Orlando, Florida
7:30 pm EDT	Akindele (yellow card) 68'	Report	Remedi 37'; González Pirez (yellow card) 59'; Hyndman 78'; Escobar (yellow card) 85'; Pogba (yellow card) 90'; Guzan (yellow card) 90+2'	Stadium: Exploria Stadium; Attendance: 18,461; Referee: Rubiel Vazquez
Note: New club record attendance for U.S. Open Cup match

== Squad statistics ==
=== Appearances ===
As of match played October 6, 2019

Starting appearances are listed first, followed by substitute appearances after the + symbol where applicable.

No.	Pos	Nat	Player	Total		MLS		Open Cup	
No.	Pos	Nat	Player	Apps	Goals	Apps	Goals	Apps	Goals
Goalkeepers
18	GK	(Trinidad and Tobago) TRI	Greg Ranjitsingh	2	0	2	0	0	0
23	GK	(United States) USA	Brian Rowe	32	0	32	0	0	0
99	GK	(United States) USA	Adam Grinwis	4	0	0	0	4	0
Defenders
2	DF	(Brazil) BRA	Ruan	28	0	23+2	0	3	0
3	DF	(United States) USA	Alex DeJohn	9	0	6	0	1+2	0
6	DF	(Sweden) SWE	Robin Jansson	32	1	28	0	4	1
12	DF	(United States) USA	Shane O'Neill	12	0	9+2	0	1	0
22	DF	(Senegal) SEN	Lamine Sané	30	0	25+1	0	4	0
24	DF	(United States) USA	Kyle Smith	24	0	15+8	0	1	0
25	DF	(United States) USA	Danilo Acosta	8	0	8	0	0	0
27	DF	(Canada) CAN	Kamal Miller	16	0	14+2	0	0	0
34	DF	(United States) USA	Randy Mendoza	1	0	0	0	0+1	0
44	DF	(Portugal) POR	João Moutinho	18	0	15+1	0	2	0
Midfielders
4	MF	(Canada) CAN	Will Johnson	23	1	20+1	1	2	0
5	MF	(United States) USA	Dillon Powers	10	0	7	0	2+1	0
7	MF	(Colombia) COL	Cristian Higuita	11	0	7+2	0	2	0
8	MF	(Ecuador) ECU	Sebas Méndez	25	0	20+3	0	2	0
16	AM	(United States) USA	Sacha Kljestan	27	3	14+9	1	4	2
20	MF	(Spain) ESP	Uri Rosell	21	0	16+4	0	0+1	0
26	MF	(Peru) PER	Carlos Ascues	19	1	14+3	1	0+2	0
33	MF	(Uruguay) URU	Mauricio Pereyra	6	0	5+1	0	0	0
Forwards
9	FW	(United States) USA	Chris Mueller	33	6	16+13	5	3+1	1
13	FW	(Canada) CAN	Tesho Akindele	32	11	22+6	10	4	1
14	FW	(United States) USA	Dom Dwyer	29	7	16+11	7	1+1	0
17	FW	(Portugal) POR	Nani	33	12	26+4	12	2+1	0
19	FW	(United States) USA	Benji Michel	20	6	9+8	5	0+3	1
29	FW	(Colombia) COL	Santiago Patiño	13	2	3+8	2	2	0
77	FW	(Brazil) BRA	Robinho	6	0	3+3	0	0	0
Players away from the club on loan:
10	MF	(Paraguay) PAR	Josué Colmán	8	0	1+7	0	0	0
15	MF	(United States) USA	Cam Lindley	0	0	0	0	0	0
31	GK	(United States) USA	Mason Stajduhar	0	0	0	0	0	0

=== Goalscorers ===
As of match played October 6, 2019

Rank	No.	Pos.	Name	MLS	Open Cup	Total
1	17	FW	(Portugal) Nani	12	0	12
2	13	FW	(Canada) Tesho Akindele	10	1	11
3	14	FW	(United States) Dom Dwyer	7	0	7
4	9	FW	(United States) Chris Mueller	5	1	6
4	19	FW	(United States) Benji Michel	5	1	6
6	16	MF	(United States) Sacha Kljestan	1	2	3
7	29	FW	(Colombia) Santiago Patiño	2	0	2
8	4	MF	(Canada) Will Johnson	1	0	1
8	6	DF	(Sweden) Robin Jansson	0	1	1
8	26	MF	(Peru) Carlos Ascues	1	0	1
Total				44	6	50

=== Shutouts ===
As of match played October 6, 2019

Rank	No.	Name	MLS	Open Cup	Total
1	23	(United States) Brian Rowe	7	0	7
Total			7	0	7

=== Disciplinary record ===
As of match played October 6, 2019

No.	Pos.	Name	MLS			Open Cup			Total		
No.	Pos.	Name	Booked	(yellow card) (yellow-red card)	Sent off (straight red)	Booked	(yellow card) (yellow-red card)	Sent off (straight red)	Booked	(yellow card) (yellow-red card)	Sent off (straight red)
2	DF	(Brazil) Ruan	1	0	0	0	0	0	1	0	0
3	DF	(United States) Alex DeJohn	1	0	0	1	0	0	2	0	0
4	MF	(Canada) Will Johnson	2	0	0	0	0	0	2	0	0
6	DF	(Sweden) Robin Jansson	6	0	1	0	0	0	6	0	1
7	MF	(Colombia) Cristian Higuita	5	0	0	0	0	0	5	0	0
8	MF	(Ecuador) Sebas Méndez	7	0	0	1	0	0	8	0	0
9	FW	(United States) Chris Mueller	1	0	0	0	0	0	1	0	0
12	DF	(United States) Shane O'Neill	2	0	0	0	0	0	2	0	0
13	FW	(Canada) Tesho Akindele	1	0	0	1	0	0	2	0	0
14	FW	(United States) Dom Dwyer	7	0	1	0	0	0	7	0	1
16	MF	(United States) Sacha Kljestan	3	0	1	1	0	0	4	0	1
17	FW	(Portugal) Nani	4	0	0	0	0	0	4	0	0
19	FW	(United States) Benji Michel	0	0	0	2	0	0	2	0	0
20	MF	(Spain) Uri Rosell	6	0	0	0	0	0	6	0	0
22	DF	(Senegal) Lamine Sané	4	0	0	0	0	0	4	0	0
23	GK	(United States) Brian Rowe	1	0	0	0	0	0	1	0	0
24	DF	(United States) Kyle Smith	4	0	0	0	0	0	4	0	0
25	DF	(United States) Danilo Acosta	1	0	0	0	0	0	1	0	0
26	MF	(Peru) Carlos Ascues	2	0	0	0	0	0	2	0	0
29	FW	(Colombia) Santiago Patiño	1	0	0	0	0	0	1	0	0
33	MF	(Uruguay) Mauricio Pereyra	1	0	0	0	0	0	1	0	0
44	DF	(Portugal) João Moutinho	1	0	0	0	0	0	1	0	0
Total			60	0	3	6	0	0	66	0	3

== Player movement ==
Per Major League Soccer and club policies, terms of the deals do not get disclosed.

=== MLS SuperDraft picks ===
Draft picks are not automatically signed to the team roster. The 2019 draft was held on January 11, 2019. Orlando had five selections.

2019 Orlando City MLS SuperDraft Picks
Round	Selection	Player	Position	College	Status
1	3	(Colombia) Santiago Patiño	CF	Florida International University	Signed
2	27	(Canada) Kamal Miller	CB	(New York (state)) Syracuse University	Signed
2	38	(United States) Tommy Madden	LB	(North Carolina) UNC Charlotte	Not signed
3	59	(United States) Scott DeVoss	CB	(Colorado) University of Denver	Not signed
4	96	PASS			

=== Transfers in ===
No.	Name	Pos.	Transferred from	Fee/notes	Date	Ref.
13	(Canada) Tesho Akindele	CF	(United States) FC Dallas	Acquired for $100k of 2019 TAM and $50k of 2020 GAM	December 9, 2018	
44	(Portugal) João Moutinho	LB	(United States) Los Angeles FC	Traded in exchange for Mohamed El Monir	December 11, 2018	
18	(Trinidad and Tobago) Greg Ranjitsingh	GK	(United States) Louisville City FC	Undisclosed fee	December 19, 2018	
24	(United States) Kyle Smith	RB	(United States) Louisville City FC	Free transfer	December 19, 2018	
8	(Ecuador) Sebas Méndez	DM	(Ecuador) Independiente del Valle	Undisclosed fee, reportedly $1.8 million	December 28, 2018	
19	(United States) Benji Michel	RW	(United States) Portland Pilots	Signed Homegrown contract	December 31, 2018	
3	(United States) Alex DeJohn	CB	(Sweden) Dalkurd FF	Free transfer	January 10, 2019	
17	(Portugal) Nani	LW	(Portugal) Sporting CP	Free transfer	February 18, 2019	
23	(United States) Brian Rowe	GK	(Canada) Vancouver Whitecaps FC	Free transfer	February 22, 2019	
6	(Sweden) Robin Jansson	CB	(Sweden) AIK	Undisclosed fee, reportedly $540k	March 12, 2019	
95	(Brazil) Robinho	LW	(United States) Columbus Crew SC	Acquired for $50k of 2019 TAM	July 11, 2019	
33	(Uruguay) Mauricio Pereyra	AM	(Russia) FC Krasnodar	Free transfer	July 30, 2019	

=== Loans in ===
No.	Name	Pos.	Loaned from	Notes	Date	Ref.
26	(Peru) Carlos Ascues	DM	(Peru) Alianza Lima	12-month loan extension exercised	N/A	
25	(United States) Danilo Acosta	LB	(United States) Real Salt Lake	One-year loan with option to buy in exchange for $75k GAM	December 28, 2018	
2	(Brazil) Ruan	RB	(Brazil) Barra da Tijuca	One-year loan	January 16, 2019	

=== Transfers out ===
No.	Name	Pos.	Transferred to	Fee/notes	Date	Ref.
1	(United States) Joe Bendik	GK	(United States) Columbus Crew	Option declined; Rights acquired by Columbus Crew in exchange for $50k TAM on 12/27/2018	November 27, 2018	
6	(Canada) Richie Laryea	CM	(Canada) Toronto FC	Option declined; Signed with Toronto FC on 3/21/19	November 27, 2018	
8	(United States) Tony Rocha	CM	(United States) New York City FC	Option declined; Rights acquired by NYCFC in exchange for a 2019 MLS SuperDraft fourth round pick on 12/12/18	November 27, 2018	
28	(United States) Chris Schuler	CB	Retired	Option declined	November 27, 2018	
2	(United States) Jonathan Spector	CB	(Scotland) Hibernian	Option declined; Signed with Hibernian on 3/15/19	November 27, 2018	
21	(Switzerland) Scott Sutter	RB	(Canada) Vancouver Whitecaps FC	Option declined; Signed with Vancouver Whitecaps on 1/30/19	November 27, 2018	
25	(United States) Donny Toia	LB	(United States) Real Salt Lake	Option declined; Rights acquired by Real Salt Lake in 2018 MLS Re-Entry Draft on 12/14/18	November 27, 2018	
33	(United States) Jose Villarreal	CF	(United States) Las Vegas Lights	Option declined; Signed with Las Vegas on 5/29/19	November 27, 2018	
36	(United States) Earl Edwards Jr.	GK	(United States) D.C. United	Contract expired; Rights acquired by D.C. United in exchange for a 2019 MLS SuperDraft second round pick on 12/19/18	November 27, 2018	
94	(Brazil) Victor "PC" Giro	LB	(Canada) Vancouver Whitecaps FC	Traded in exchange for Vancouver's natural third-round pick in the 2019 MLS SuperDraft	December 9, 2018	
13	(Libya) Mohamed El Monir	LB	(United States) Los Angeles FC	Traded in exchange for João Moutinho	December 11, 2018	
3	(Egypt) Amro Tarek	CB	(United States) New York Red Bulls	Traded in exchange for Red Bulls's natural fourth-round pick in the 2019 MLS SuperDraft	December 11, 2018	
19	(Peru) Yoshimar Yotún	LW	(Mexico) Cruz Azul	Sold for $4 million	December 27, 2018	
29	(Brazil) Stefano Pinho	CF	(Thailand) PT Prachuap	Waived; Signed with PT Prachuap on 1/23/19	January 16, 2019	
27	(United States) R. J. Allen	RB	(United States) FC Motown	Waived; Signed with FC Motown on 4/5/19	February 6, 2019	
11	(United States) Pierre da Silva	LW	(United States) Memphis 901	Released; Signed with Memphis 901 on 8/5/19	July 31, 2019	

=== Loans out ===
No.	Name	Pos.	Loaned to	Notes	Date	Ref.
11	(United States) Pierre da Silva	LW	(Brazil) Club Athletico Paranaense	Until end of season	February 7, 2019	
31	(United States) Mason Stajduhar	GK	(United States) Tulsa Roughnecks FC	Until end of season (temporarily recalled June 24, 2019)	March 15, 2019	
15	(United States) Cam Lindley	DM	(United States) Memphis 901 FC	Until end of season	April 12, 2019	
10	(Paraguay) Josué Colmán	AM	(Paraguay) Cerro Porteño	One and a half year loan with right of recall	June 12, 2019	

== Broadcasting ==
Orlando City will be featured on national television 6 times during the 2019 season, while all remaining matches will be televised locally on WRBW My65. This means that 30 of Orlando's 34 regular-season matches will be broadcast on FOX entities between FOX 35, My65 and Fox Sports. Following City's exclusive streaming partner deal with YouTube TV made in May 2018, YouTube TV online subscribers will have access to all of FOX's locally and nationally televised matches.

Radio coverage for City will be provided in both English and Spanish during the 2019 season. La Nueva 990 AM will serve as the Spanish language broadcaster while English commentary will be split between FM 96.9 The Game and Real Radio 104.1 FM all season long.
