= Carlos Ascues =

Footballer (born 1992)

Personal information
- Full name: Carlos Antonio Ascues Ávila
- Date of birth: 19 June 1992 (age 34)
- Place of birth: Caracas, Venezuela
- Height: 1.84 m (6 ft 0 in)
- Position: Central midfielder

Team information
- Current team: Alianza Universidad
- Number: 5

Youth career
- 2003–2010: Alianza Lima

Senior career*
Years	Team	Apps	(Gls)
2011–2012	Alianza Lima	22	(1)
2012–2013	Benfica B	22	(0)
2013–2015	Panetolikos	0	(0)
2014	→ Universidad San Martin (loan)	19	(1)
2015	Melgar	6	(0)
2015–2017	VfL Wolfsburg	1	(0)
2017–2021	Melgar	21	(0)
2017–2018	→ Alianza Lima (loan)	23	(6)
2018–2019	→ Orlando City (loan)	26	(1)
2020	→ Alianza Lima (loan)	24	(4)
2021	→ Alianza Atlético (loan)	17	(2)
2022–2024	UCV	84	(1)
2025	Asociación Deportiva Tarma	8	(0)
2025-	Alianza Universidad	10	(1)

International career^{‡}
2014–	Peru	26	(5)
Medal record
Representing Peru
Association football
Copa America
Bronze medal – third place	Chile 2015
- * Club domestic league appearances and goals as of 21 November 2019 ‡ National team caps and goals as of 23 March 2024

Carlos Antonio Ascues Ávila (born 19 June 1992), also known as Pogbascues, due to his physical and technical similarities to Paul Pogba, is a professional footballer who plays as a central midfielder for Peruvian Primera División side Alianza Universidad. Born in Venezuela, Ascues represents the Peru national team.

== Club career ==
=== Early career ===
Born in Caracas, Venezuela to Peruvian parents of African descent, Ascues began his youth career at Alianza Lima and moved up to the first team in the 2011 season. He finally made his professional league debut in the Torneo Descentralizado on 15 May 2011 in the 2–0 away win over Sport Huancayo.

=== Move to Europe ===
On 11 August 2012, Ascues signed for Portuguese side Benfica but was immediately sent to the B-team where he played 22 times in the second division.

On 21 August 2013, Ascues signed a two-year contract with Panetolikos in Greece.

=== Return to Peru ===
However, in January 2014, Ascues returned to Peru when he joined Universidad San Martin in a one-year loan deal. On 3 February 2015, he returned to Peru on a permanent deal when he signed a two-year contract with Melgar of the Peruvian Primera División.

=== VfL Wolfsburg ===
On 23 July 2015, Ascues returned to Europe, signing a three-year deal with Bundesliga side VfL Wolfsburg for a fee of €1.5 million. He made his debut for the team as a substitute on 1 April 2016, subbing on for Robin Knoche in the 82nd minute of a defeat to 3–0 away defeat to Bayer Leverkusen. The only other senior appearance he would make was in a DfB Pokal first round game against FSV Frankfurt the following season.

=== Third spell in Peru ===
On 3 January 2017, Ascues rejoined former club Melgar on loan until the end of the 2016–17 Bundesliga season. Upon the completion of the loan, he rejoined another of his former clubs, Alianza Lima, for the second half of the season. Ascues played 10 games and scored four goals as Alianza Lima won the 2017 Peruvian Primera División title.

=== Orlando City ===
On 16 August 2018, he joined Orlando City on loan until the end of the 2018 MLS season with an option for a 12-month extension. He made his debut in a 2–1 defeat to Atlanta United on 25 August and started every remaining game except for the final day of the season when he was ruled out with a quad injury as Orlando lost 1–0 to New York Red Bulls. The loan was extended for the 2019 season. On 21 November 2019, it was announced Ascues had his contract option for the 2020 season declined by Orlando as part of the end-of-season roster decisions.

== International career ==
In 2011, Ascues featured for and was captain of the Peru U20 side at the 2011 Sudamericano U-20.

On 6 August 2014, Ascues made his full senior debut for the Peru national team, scoring two goals in a 3–0 friendly win against Panama. He was a member of the squad that finished in third place at the 2015 Copa América and also featured six times during the 2018 FIFA World Cup qualification as Peru finished fifth before beating New Zealand in a playoff to reach the team's first World Cup since 1982. However, Ascues was not selected for the tournament.

== Career statistics ==
=== Club ===
As of 21 September 2019

Appearances and goals by club, season and competition
Club	Season	League			National cup (Note: Includes Greek Cup, Torneo del Inca, DFB-Pokal and U.S. Open Cup)		League cup		Continental		Total	
Club	Season	Division	Apps	Goals	Apps	Goals	Apps	Goals	Apps	Goals	Apps	Goals
Alianza Lima	2011	Peruvian Primera División	5	0	1	0	0	0	0	0	6	0
Alianza Lima	2012	Peruvian Primera División	17	1	0	0	0	0	5	0	22	1
Alianza Lima	Total		22	1	1	0	0	0	5	0	28	1
Benfica B	2012–13	Segunda Liga	22	0	—		—		—		22	0
Panetolikos	2013–14	Super League Greece	0	0	1	0	—		—		1	0
Universidad San Martín (loan)	2014	Peruvian Primera División	19	1	15	1	—		—		34	2
Melgar	2015	Peruvian Primera División	6	0	8	0	—		—		14	0
VfL Wolfsburg	2015–16	Bundesliga	1	0	0	0	—		0	0	1	0
VfL Wolfsburg	2016–17	Bundesliga	0	0	1	0	—		—		1	0
VfL Wolfsburg	Total		1	0	1	0	0	0	0	0	2	0
Melgar (loan)	2017	Peruvian Primera División	21	0	—		—		—		21	0
Alianza Lima	2017	Peruvian Primera División	10	4	—		—		5	0	15	4
Alianza Lima	2018	Peruvian Primera División	13	2	—		—		4	0	17	2
Alianza Lima	Total		23	6	0	0	0	0	9	0	32	6
Orlando City (loan)	2018	MLS	9	0	0	0	—		—		9	0
Orlando City (loan)	2019	MLS	17	1	2	0	—		—		19	1
Orlando City (loan)	Total		26	1	2	0	0	0	0	0	28	1
Career Total			140	9	27	1	0	0	14	0	181	10

=== International ===
Scores and results list Peru's goal tally first, score column indicates score after each Ascues goal.

List of international goals scored by Carlos Ascues
No.	Date	Venue	Opponent	Score	Result	Competition
1	6 August 2014	Estadio Nacional, Lima, Peru	Panama	1–0	3–0	Friendly
2	6 August 2014	Estadio Nacional, Lima, Peru	Panama	3–0	3–0	Friendly
3	14 October 2014	Estadio Alejandro Villanueva, Lima, Peru	Guatemala	1–0	1–0	Friendly
4	18 November 2014	Estadio Nacional, Lima, Peru	Paraguay	1–0	2–0	Friendly
5	18 November 2014	Estadio Nacional, Lima, Peru	Paraguay	2–0	2–0	Friendly

== Honours ==
FBC Melgar

- Peruvian Primera División: 2015

VfL Wolfsburg

- DFL-Supercup: 2015

Alianza Lima

- Peruvian Primera División: 2017
