= Lamine Sané =

French-Senegalese footballer (born 1987)

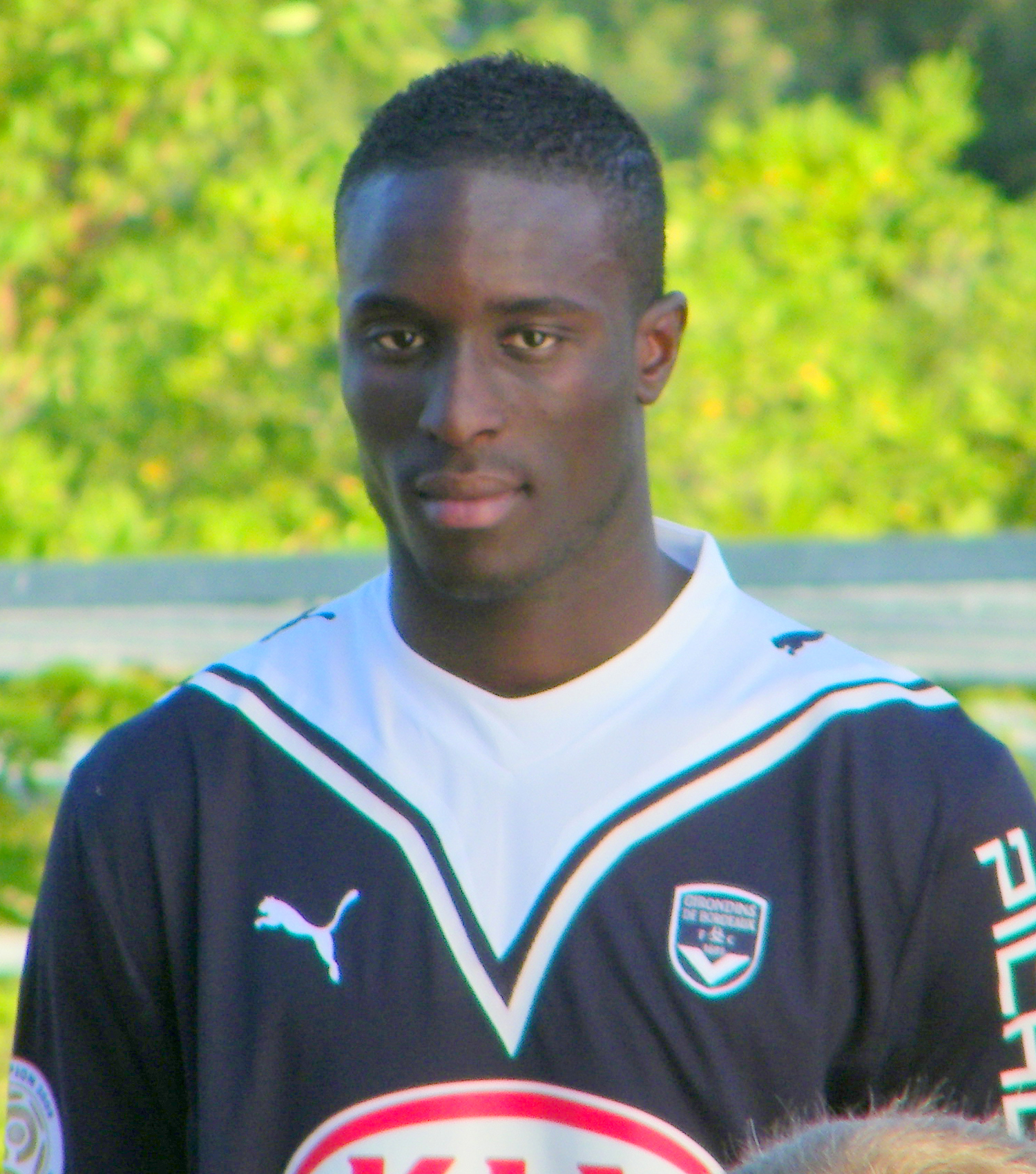
- Sané with Bordeaux

Personal information
- Full name: Ludovic Lamine Sané
- Date of birth: 22 March 1987 (age 39)
- Place of birth: Villeneuve-sur-Lot, France
- Height: 1.95 m (6 ft 5 in)
- Positions: Centre-back; defensive midfielder

Youth career
- 1997–2003: US Lormont
- 2003–2006: Stade Bordelais
- 2008–2009: Bordeaux

Senior career*
Years	Team	Apps	(Gls)
2006–2007	Agde	25	(1)
2007–2008	US Lormont		
2009–2016	Bordeaux	188	(7)
2016–2018	Werder Bremen	38	(2)
2018–2019	Orlando City	42	(1)
2020	FC Utrecht	1	(0)

International career
2010–2015	Senegal	35	(0)
- * Club domestic league appearances and goals

Ludovic Lamine Sané (born 22 March 1987) is a former professional footballer. He played primarily as a centre-back but was also used as a holding midfielder. Born in France, he represented Senegal at the international level.

== Career ==
=== Early career ===
Sané was born in Villeneuve-sur-Lot in southwestern France and began his football career playing for local club US Lormont on the outskirts of Bordeaux. He later joined Stade Bordelais before signing a contract with Championnat de France amateur club RCO Agde at the age of 19. Sané spent one season at Agde, appearing in 25 matches and scoring one goal. Following the season, he returned to Lormont and spent a season playing in the Division d'Honneur. During the summer of 2008, Sané jumped five divisions by signing a three-year professional contract with Ligue 1 club Bordeaux.

=== Bordeaux ===
Sané initially played with the club's reserve team upon his arrival appearing in 15 matches during the 2008–09 season. While playing with the amateurs, the young player impressed manager Laurent Blanc and assistant Jean-Louis Gasset. For the 2009–10 pre-season, Sané featured regularly and performed well, most notably in a 3–1 win over Spanish club Athletic Bilbao after appearing as a second-half substitute. On 19 September 2009, Sané was called up to the first team for the first time for Bordeaux's league match against Boulogne. He didn't appear in the match, but eventually became a regular in the first 18 often appearing on the bench as a backup for French international Alou Diarra. On 3 November, Sané made his professional debut in the club's 2–0 victory over German club Bayern Munich in the UEFA Champions League appearing as a substitute in the 84th minute. The following month, he earned his first start playing the entire match in Bordeaux's 1–0 victory over Israeli club Maccabi Haifa. Sané made his league debut four days later in Bordeaux's important tie with Lyon. Bordeaux won the match 1–0 with Sané playing the full 90 minutes.

On 8 January 2010, Sané agreed to a contract extension with Bordeaux which will tie him to the club until 2014. He scored his first goal for Bordeaux in a 3–1 loss to Olympique de Marseille in a Coupe de la Ligue final at the Stade de France.

=== Werder Bremen ===
After spending seven senior years at Bordeaux, Sané departed the club and signed for Bundesliga side Werder Bremen for an undisclosed fee. In January 2018, the club's sporting director Frank Baumann announced that Sané would not be part of the team "for the time being" because he had been absent from training on two days without a valid excuse. Sané would also be allowed to settle his personal sporting future.

=== Orlando City ===
On 20 February 2018, Sané signed for Major League Soccer side Orlando City SC. He made his debut as a halftime substitute away to New York City on 17 March and scored his first goal for the club against Real Salt Lake in a 3–1 home victory on 6 May. After an injury-troubled first season with the club in which they set a new MLS record for goals conceded in a season, Sané formed a strong central partnership with Robin Jansson in 2019 and was a regular starter as Orlando turned things around defensively, conceding a team-record low number of goals. Despite this, on 21 November 2019, it was announced Sané had his contract option for the 2020 season declined by Orlando as part of the end-of-season roster decisions.

=== FC Utrecht ===
On 8 February 2020, Sané signed for FC Utrecht until the end of the season. He made his debut on 16 February as an 89th minute substitute against Willem II, entering with Utrecht leading 1–0. The game finished 1–1 after Willem II scored a stoppage time equalizer. Sané was an unused substitute in the next three league games as well as a 2–0 KNVB Cup semi-final win over Ajax before the season was canceled due to the COVID-19 pandemic in April. He was released at the end of his contract having made one appearance.

== Personal life ==
Ludovic's younger brother Salif Sané is also a professional footballer and Senegalese international.

== Career statistics ==
=== Club ===
As of 6 October 2020

Appearances and goals by club, season and competition
Club	Season	League			Cup (Note: Appearances in Coupe de France, Coupe de la Ligue, Trophée des Champions)		Continental		Total	
Club	Season	Division	Apps	Goals	Apps	Goals	Apps	Goals	Apps	Goals
Agde	2006–07	CFA	25	1	0	0	—		25	1
Bordeaux	2009–10	Ligue 1	17	1	5	1	6	0	28	2
Bordeaux	2010–11	Ligue 1	33	2	4	0	—		37	2
Bordeaux	2011–12	Ligue 1	32	2	1	0	—		33	2
Bordeaux	2012–13	Ligue 1	33	1	1	0	9	1	42	2
Bordeaux	2013–14	Ligue 1	36	0	5	0	4	2	45	2
Bordeaux	2014–15	Ligue 1	23	1	1	0	0	0	24	1
Bordeaux	2015–16	Ligue 1	13	0	4	0	4	0	21	0
Bordeaux	Total		188	7	21	1	23	3	232	11
Werder Bremen	2016–17	Bundesliga	27	1	1	0	—		28	1
Werder Bremen	2017–18	Bundesliga	11	1	1	0	—		12	1
Werder Bremen	Total		38	2	2	0	0	0	40	2
Orlando City	2018	MLS	16	1	1	0	—		17	1
Orlando City	2019	MLS	26	0	4	0	—		30	0
Orlando City	Total		42	1	5	0	0	0	47	1
FC Utrecht	2019–20	Eredivisie	1	0	0	0	—		1	0
Career total			293	11	28	1	23	3	344	15

== Honours ==
Bordeaux

- Coupe de France: 2012–13
