= Tesho Akindele =

Canadian soccer player

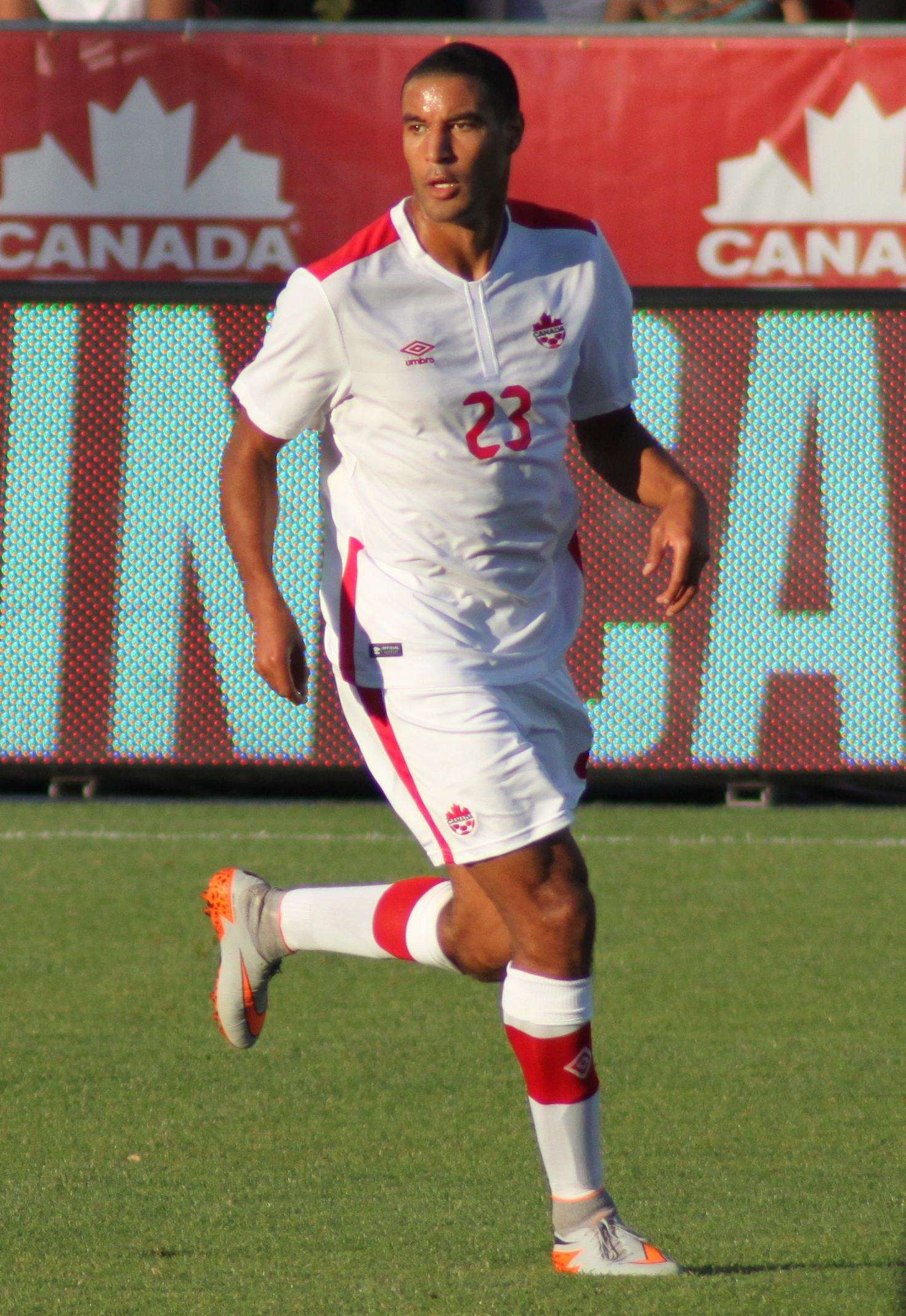
- Akindele with Canada in 2015

Personal information
- Full name: Tesho Akindele
- Date of birth: March 31, 1992 (age 34)
- Place of birth: Calgary, Canada
- Height: 1.85 m (6 ft 1 in)
- Positions: Forward; winger

College career
Years	Team	Apps	(Gls)
2010–2013	Colorado Mines Orediggers	83	(76)

Senior career*
Years	Team	Apps	(Gls)
2013	Real Colorado Foxes	1	(0)
2014–2018	FC Dallas	133	(24)
2019–2022	Orlando City SC	104	(19)
2022	→ Orlando City B (loan)	1	(1)
2024	Des Moines Menace	0	(0)
Total		139	(44)

International career^{‡}
2009	Canada U17	1	(0)
2015–2021	Canada	19	(3)
- * Club domestic league appearances and goals as of April 3, 2024 ‡ National team caps and goals as of December 12, 2022

Tesho Akindele (born March 31, 1992) is a Canadian former professional soccer player who played as a forward or winger.

As a professional soccer player, Akindele was named the 2014 MLS Rookie of the Year. Akindele also helped FC Dallas win the 2016 U.S. Open Cup and Supporters' Shield, and Orlando City win the 2022 U.S. Open Cup. Akindele also made 19 appearances and scored three goals for the Canada national team from 2015 to 2021.

== Early career ==
=== Early career ===
Tesho Akindele was born in Canada to a Nigerian father and a Canadian mother and moved with his family to the US at the age of eight. He grew up in Thornton, Colorado, and was a standout for Northglenn High School, turning down an offer to join the Colorado Rapids academy at the age of 17 to focus on academics.

=== College career ===
Akindele played four years of college soccer at the Colorado School of Mines, where he became the school's all-time goals leader with 76 goals scored and was a four-time All-American. He ranked second in the nation in goals scored in 2012 with 22 and was named a First Team NSCAA All-American and the 2012 RMAC Offensive Player of the Year for his efforts. Also an NSCAA First Team All-American and the RMAC Freshman of the Year in 2010, Akindele was the first player in the history of his school's conference to score three consecutive hat tricks.

== Club career ==
Akindele made a single appearance for USL PDL club Real Colorado Foxes in 2013.

=== FC Dallas ===
On January 16, 2014, Akindele was drafted in the first round (sixth overall) of the 2014 MLS SuperDraft by FC Dallas, becoming the highest-highest-drafted NCAA Division II player in MLS history. Akindele made his professional debut in a 2–3 loss against Seattle Sounders FC on April 12, 2014. After scoring seven goals in 26 appearances, Akindele was named MLS Rookie of the Year.

=== Orlando City ===
On December 9, 2018, Dallas traded Akindele to Orlando City in exchange for $100,000 of Targeted Allocation Money in 2019 and $50,000 of General Allocation Money in 2020. He scored on his debut, a 2–2 draw in Orlando's season opener against New York City FC. Akindele had his option for the 2020 season exercised by Orlando, keeping him with the club for 2020. On May 1, 2021, Akindele broke the record for the fastest goal scored in Orlando City history at the time when he intercepted a backpass from Nick Hagglund to score the opener of a 3–0 win over FC Cincinnati in 31 seconds, breaking the previous record of 63 seconds set by Chris Mueller in 2018. Upon completion of the 2021 season, Akindele's option for the 2022 season was picked up by Orlando. The club declined Akindele's contract option as part of the end of season roster moves on November 14, 2022. At the time of his departure he ranked second all-time in appearances for the club in all competitions with 121 behind only Chris Mueller and sixth for goals with 21.

In December 2022, Akindele announced his retirement from professional soccer.

=== Des Moines Menace ===
In April 2024, Akindele joined Des Moines Menace ahead of the 2024 U.S. Open Cup second round match.

== International career ==
Akindele attended a youth training camp of the Canadian youth national team in 2009 and played for Canada's U-17 national team in a friendly against Costa Rica on April 2, 2009. On November 5, 2014, it was reported that Akindele had turned down a call-up from Canada with a view to represent the United States instead, and on January 9, 2015, he was called up to the United States senior team camp ahead of friendly matches versus Chile and Panama. He did not play in either friendly due to not having an American passport at the time of the friendlies.

However, on April 14, 2015, Canada coach Benito Floro told media that Akindele was "99.9 percent" going to represent Canada instead of the United States, and on June 2, Akindele accepted a call-up to the Canada national team for two 2018 FIFA World Cup qualifying matches against Dominica. He made his debut for Canada against Dominica on June 11. He scored his first goal for Canada on June 16 in the return leg against Dominica at BMO Field in a 4–0 victory. Akindele scored his second Canada goal in a 1–1 friendly draw in June 2016 with Azerbaijan.

Having been left out of the original 23-man squad for the 2021 CONCACAF Gold Cup, Akindele was called-up by Canada at the quarter-final stage on July 23 as an injury replacement for Ayo Akinola. He appeared as a 70th-minute substitute against Costa Rica as Canada progressed to the semi-finals with a 2–0 win.

== Personal life ==
Akindele has two children with his wife Taylor, an accountant. He has a bachelor's degree in engineer and master's degree in finance.

== After soccer ==
Akindele is an urbanism activist who advocates for mixed-use development and affordable housing, largely through social media. Akindele also became a real estate developer, focused on urban settings. Akindele began his interest in real estate development by getting involved in the YIMBY movement while in Orlando.

Akindele became a development analyst for ATCO Properties & Management to work on the Camp North End project in Charlotte, North Carolina. Akindele later became a retail leasing associate for Jamestown L.P..

== Career statistics ==
=== Club ===
As of October 16, 2022

Club	League	Season	League		Playoffs		Domestic Cup		Continental		Other		Total	
Club	League	Season	Apps	Goals	Apps	Goals	Apps	Goals	Apps	Goals	Apps	Goals	Apps	Goals
Real Colorado Foxes	USL PDL	2013	1	0	0	0	0	0	—		—		1	0
FC Dallas	MLS	2014	26	7	3	1	4	1	—		—		33	9
FC Dallas	MLS	2015	28	5	4	1	0	0	—		—		32	6
FC Dallas	MLS	2016	31	6	2	1	4	0	4	0	—		41	7
FC Dallas	MLS	2017	29	4	—		3	0	4	0	—		36	4
FC Dallas	MLS	2018	18	2	1	0	1	1	1	0	—		21	3
FC Dallas	Total		132	24	10	3	12	2	9	0	0	0	163	29
Orlando City SC	MLS	2019	28	10	—		4	1	—		—		32	11
Orlando City SC	MLS	2020	17	3	2	0	—		—		4 (Note: Knockout Round of the MLS is Back Tournament.)	1	23	4
Orlando City SC	MLS	2021	32	3	1	0	—		1	0	—		34	3
Orlando City SC	MLS	2022	27	3	1	0	4	0	—		—		32	3
Orlando City SC	Total		104	19	4	0	8	1	1	0	4	1	121	21
Orlando City B (loan)	MLS Next Pro	2022	1	1	—		—		—		—		1	1
Career statistics			238	44	14	3	20	3	10	0	4	1	286	51

=== International ===
As of July 29, 2021

Canada national team
2015	7	1
2016	6	1
2017	0	0
2018	1	0
2019	0	0
2020	3	1
2021	2	0
Total	19	3

==== International goals ====
As of match played January 7, 2020. Canada score listed first, score column indicates score after each Akindele goal.

International goals by date, venue, cap, opponent, score, result and competition
No.	Date	Venue	Cap	Opponent	Score	Result	Competition
1	June 16, 2015	BMO Field, Toronto, Canada	2	Dominica	1–0	4–0	2018 FIFA World Cup qualification
2	June 3, 2016	Stadion Rohrbach, Rohrbach an der Lafnitz, Austria	11	Azerbaijan	1–0	1–1	Friendly
3	January 7, 2020	Championship Soccer Stadium, Irvine, United States	15	Barbados	2–0	4–1	Friendly

== Honours ==
=== Club ===
FC Dallas

- Supporters' Shield: 2016
- U.S. Open Cup: 2016

Orlando City

- U.S. Open Cup: 2022

=== Individual ===
- MLS Rookie of the Year: 2014
