= Oriol Rosell =

Spanish footballer (born 1992)

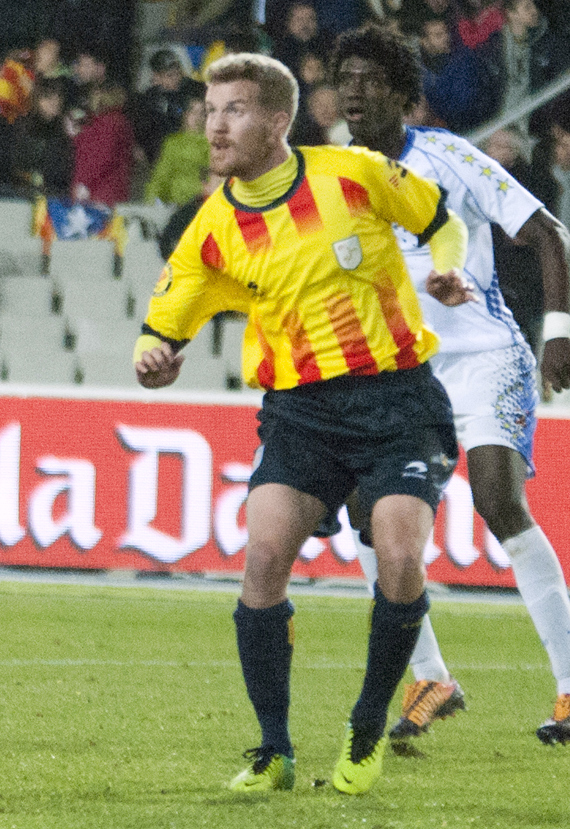
- Rosell playing for Catalonia in 2013

Personal information
- Full name: Oriol Rosell Argerich
- Date of birth: 7 July 1992 (age 34)
- Place of birth: Puig-reig, Spain
- Height: 1.82 m (6 ft 0 in)
- Position: Defensive midfielder

Youth career
- Espanyol
- 2006–2011: Barcelona

Senior career*
Years	Team	Apps	(Gls)
2011–2012	Barcelona B	6	(0)
2012–2014	Sporting Kansas City	43	(2)
2014–2018	Sporting CP	12	(0)
2016	→ Vitória Guimarães (loan)	4	(0)
2016	→ Vitória Guimarães B (loan)	2	(0)
2016–2017	→ Belenenses (loan)	14	(0)
2017–2018	→ Portimonense (loan)	12	(1)
2018–2021	Orlando City	64	(0)
2022	Sporting Kansas City	18	(0)
2023	LA Galaxy	16	(0)

International career
2013	Catalonia	1	(0)
- * Club domestic league appearances and goals as of 19:04, 30 December 2023 (UTC)

Oriol "Uri" Rosell Argerich (Catalan pronunciation: [ˈuɾi ruˈseʎ]; born 7 July 1992) is a Spanish professional footballer who plays as a defensive midfielder.

Beginning his career at Barcelona where he was only a reserve, he spent most of it in the United States and Portugal. He played over 125 Major League Soccer games, winning the MLS Cup in 2013 with Sporting Kansas City and also representing Orlando City and LA Galaxy. He made 42 Primeira Liga appearances for four clubs including Sporting CP, where he won the Taça de Portugal in 2015.

Rosell was an international for Catalonia.

== Club career ==
=== Barcelona ===
Born in Puig-reig, Barcelona, Catalonia, Rosell joined FC Barcelona's youth system in 2006, aged 14. He made his senior debut on 14 January 2012, playing seven minutes for the reserves in a 3–1 away loss against UD Las Palmas in the Segunda División and appearing in a further five league games during the season.

=== Sporting KC ===
Rosell signed with Sporting Kansas City of Major League Soccer in August 2012, being given the number 20 and wearing "Uri" as his jersey name. He thus became the second player to graduate from Barcelona's La Masia and play in the competition, after Albert Celades. In just his second appearance for the team, on 1 September, he scored a game-winning goal against Toronto FC, netting in the 87th minute of a 2–1 home win.

Rosell made 31 appearances in 2013, heading a goal in a 3–1 victory at Philadelphia Union in the first match of the campaign. However, in the championship game against Real Salt Lake on 7 December, he was replaced injured in the eighth minute, as his team eventually prevailed in a penalty shootout after the 1–1 draw.

On 5 April 2014, Rosell received a straight red card in a goalless draw with Real Salt Lake at Sporting Park for a foul on Devon Sandoval. On 10 May, he set an MLS record after completing 160 of 166 passes against the Montreal Impact.

=== Sporting CP ===
On 3 June 2014, Kansas City and Sporting CP agreed to a transfer for Rosell; as per MLS rules, the terms of the deal were not disclosed. He made his debut on the first day of the season, coming on for the injured Cédric Soares at half-time of the 1–1 Primeira Liga draw at Académica de Coimbra.

Rosell was sent off on 14 January 2015 in a 1–0 victory over Boavista F.C. in the group stage of the Taça da Liga at the Estádio José Alvalade, for two yellow cards in the space of three minutes. He played 22 matches in all competitions in his first year, remaining on the bench on 31 May 2015 as the Lions won the Taça de Portugal in a penalty shootout against S.C. Braga.

On 30 January 2016, Rosell was loaned to Vitória S.C. of the same league until the end of the season, featuring sparingly for both them and their reserves in the Segunda Liga. He returned to the top flight the following campaign, at Sporting neighbours C.F. Os Belenenses.

Still owned by Sporting, Rosell signed with Portimonense S.C. in late August 2017. He scored his first goal in Portuguese football on 30 October, helping the hosts defeat Vitória de Setúbal 5–2.

=== Orlando City ===
Rosell returned to MLS on 30 January 2018, when he signed with Orlando City SC via the Allocation Order; the club had acquired the top spot in the process by trading $400,000 in targeted allocation money to FC Dallas. He made his debut on 22 April, as a late substitute in a 3–2 home defeat of the San Jose Earthquakes.

Ahead of 2020, Rosell agreed to a new two-year deal. His contract expired at the end of the following season and, despite being in discussions to return, he ultimately took to social media to announce his departure, with 73 official appearances to his credit.

=== Sporting KC return ===
On 21 December 2021, Rosell signed a two-year contract as a free agent with Sporting Kansas City, after seven years away. He was waived in January 2023.

=== LA Galaxy ===
Remaining in MLS, 30-year-old Rosell signed with LA Galaxy for the 2023 season on 23 February. He made his debut on 11 March in the opener away to his previous club, as an added-time substitute.

== International career ==
In December 2013, Rosell was called up by the unofficial Catalonia national team for its friendly match against Cape Verde at the Estadi Olímpic Lluís Companys in Barcelona on the penultimate day of the year. He entered the field as a 68th-minute substitute for Real Valladolid's Marc Valiente, and lined up with Barcelona players Jordi Alba, Sergio Busquets, Cesc Fàbregas and Gerard Piqué as the side came from behind to win 4–1.

== Personal life ==
Rosell publicly supported Catalan independence on several occasions, saying that he would refuse to play for Spain if requested. In 2014, he added that he would vote "Yes-Yes" in the Catalan self-determination referendum.

During his professional football career, Rosell studied for university qualifications in business, at the Chemical Institute of Sarrià and the University of Missouri–Kansas City.

== Career statistics ==
As of 7 November 2021

Club	Season	League			National Cup (Note: Includes U.S. Open Cup and Taça de Portugal)		League Cup (Note: Includes MLS Cup playoffs and Taça da Liga)		Continental (Note: Includes CONCACAF Champions League, UEFA Champions League and UEFA Europa League)		Other		Total	
Club	Season	Division	Apps	Goals	Apps	Goals	Apps	Goals	Apps	Goals	Apps	Goals	Apps	Goals
Barcelona B	2011–12	Segunda División	6	0	—		—		—		—		6	0
Sporting Kansas City	2012	Major League Soccer	5	1	0	0	1	0	—		—		6	1
Sporting Kansas City	2013	Major League Soccer	31	1	2	0	5	0	4	0	—		42	1
Sporting Kansas City	2014	Major League Soccer	7	0	0	0	—		2	0	—		9	0
Sporting Kansas City	Total		43	2	2	0	6	0	6	0	0	0	57	2
Sporting CP	2014–15	Primeira Liga	12	0	4	0	4	0	2	0	—		22	0
Vitória Guimarães (loan)	2015–16	Primeira Liga	4	0	0	0	0	0	—		—		4	0
Vitória Guimarães B (loan)	2015–16	LigaPro	2	0	0	0	0	0	—		—		2	0
Belenenses (loan)	2016–17	Primeira Liga	14	0	1	0	0	0	—		—		15	0
Portimonense (loan)	2017–18	Primeira Liga	12	1	2	0	4	0	—		—		18	1
Orlando City	2018	Major League Soccer	22	0	2	0	—		—		—		24	0
Orlando City	2019	Major League Soccer	20	0	1	0	—		—		—		21	0
Orlando City	2020	Major League Soccer	8	0	0	0	2	0	—		4 (Note: Appearances in MLS is Back Tournament knockout stage)	0	14	0
Orlando City	2021	Major League Soccer	14	0	—		0	0	0	0	—		14	0
Orlando City	Total		64	0	3	0	2	0	0	0	4	0	73	0
Career totals			157	3	13	0	16	0	8	0	4	0	197	3

== Honours ==
Sporting Kansas City

- MLS Cup: 2013

Sporting CP

- Taça de Portugal: 2014–15
