= Josué Colmán =

Paraguayan footballer (born 1998)

Personal information
- Full name: David Josué Colmán Escobar
- Date of birth: 25 July 1998 (age 28)
- Place of birth: Asunción, Paraguay
- Height: 1.68 m (5 ft 6 in)
- Positions: Attacking midfielder; winger

Team information
- Current team: Club Nacional
- Number: 22

Youth career
- Cerro Porteño

Senior career*
Years	Team	Apps	(Gls)
2016–2017	Cerro Porteño	48	(4)
2018–2020	Orlando City	32	(1)
2019–2020	→ Cerro Porteño (loan)	26	(2)
2021–2022	Guaraní	53	(4)
2022–2024	Mazatlán	39	(3)
2025	Querétaro	13	(0)
2025–2026	Newell's Old Boys	2	(0)
2026–	Club Nacional	8	(2)

International career^{‡}
2015	Paraguay U17	10	(1)
2017	Paraguay U20	2	(0)
2016	Paraguay U23	4	(0)
2022	Paraguay	1	(0)
- * Club domestic league appearances and goals as of 17:32, 17 March 2026 (UTC) ‡ National team caps and goals as of 19:10, 28 March 2022 (UTC)

David Josué Colmán Escobar (born 25 July 1998) is a Paraguayan professional footballer who plays as a midfielder for Paraguayan Primera División club Club Nacional.

== Club career ==
Colmán helped Cerro Porteño win the 2017 Torneo Clausura championship.

In January 2018, Colmán signed with Orlando City and was given a Young Designated Player tag. Colmán made his Orlando City debut on 17 March 2018 against New York City. He scored his first goal for the club on 31 March 2018 against New York Red Bulls. Colmán was left out of Orlando City's lineup for a 6 May 2018 match after he had broken a team rule in the locker room.

In June 2019, Colmán returned to Cerro Porteño on a one-and-a-half-year loan deal. On 26 September 2020, Cerro Porteño clinched the Apertura title with one match to spare following a 3–1 victory over River Plate.

Colmán had his contract option declined as part of Orlando's end of season roster moves in December 2020.

On 28 January 2021, Colmán signed with Paraguayan Primera División side Guaraní.

== International career ==
He played for the Paraguay under-17 team at the 2015 FIFA U-17 World Cup and the Paraguay under-20s at the 2017 South American U-20 Championship.

== Personal life ==
In February 2019, Colmán obtained a U.S. green card, which qualified him as a domestic player for MLS roster purposes.

== Career statistics ==
=== Club ===
As of 2 November 2024

Appearances and goals by club, season and competition
Club	Season	League			Cup		Continental		Other		Total	
Club	Season	Division	Apps	Goals	Apps	Goals	Apps	Goals	Apps	Goals	Apps	Goals
Cerro Porteño	2016	Paraguayan Primera División	16	3	—		7	0	—		23	3
Cerro Porteño	2017	Paraguayan Primera División	32	1	—		2	0	—		34	1
Cerro Porteño	Total		48	4	—		9	0	—		57	4
Orlando City	2018	Major League Soccer	24	1	3	0	—		—		27	1
Orlando City	2019	Major League Soccer	8	0	0	0	—		—		8	0
Orlando City	Total		32	1	3	0	—		—		35	1
Cerro Porteño (loan)	2019	Paraguayan Primera División	2	0	—		2	0	—		4	0
Cerro Porteño (loan)	2020	Paraguayan Primera División	25	2	—		2	0	—		27	2
Cerro Porteño (loan)	Total		27	2	—		4	0	—		31	2
Guaraní	2021	Paraguayan Primera División	34	3	—		4	0	—		38	3
Guaraní	2022	Paraguayan Primera División	19	1	—		2	1	—		21	2
Guaraní	Total		53	4	—		6	1	—		59	5
Mazatlán	2022–23	Liga MX	25	0	—		—		—		25	0
Mazatlán	2023–24	Liga MX	26	3	—		—		3	1	29	4
Mazatlán	2024–25	Liga MX	15	2	—		—		4	0	19	2
Mazatlán	Total		66	5	—		—		7	1	73	6
Career totals			1226	16	3	0	19	1	7	1	255	18

== Honours ==
Cerro Porteño

- Paraguayan Primera División: 2020 Apertura
