= Jhegson Méndez =

Ecuadorian footballer (born 1997)

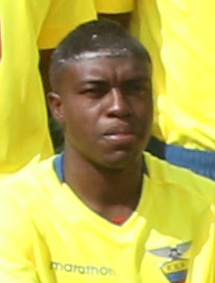
- Méndez with Ecuador U20 in 2017

Personal information
- Full name: Jhegson Sebastián Méndez Carabalí
- Date of birth: 26 April 1997 (age 29)
- Place of birth: Mira, Ecuador
- Height: 1.75 m (5 ft 9 in)
- Position: Midfielder

Team information
- Current team: Independiente del Valle
- Number: 32

Youth career
- 2010–2011: Norte América
- 2011–2015: Independiente del Valle

Senior career*
Years	Team	Apps	(Gls)
2015–2018	Independiente del Valle	81	(4)
2015–2016	→ Cultural Leonesa (loan)	1	(0)
2019–2022	Orlando City	72	(1)
2022	Los Angeles FC	9	(0)
2023–2024	São Paulo	18	(0)
2024	→ Elche (loan)	4	(0)
2025–	Independiente del Valle	44	(0)

International career^{‡}
2015	Ecuador U17	4	(0)
2015–2017	Ecuador U20	10	(0)
2018–	Ecuador	37	(0)
- * Club domestic league appearances and goals as of 26 May 2026 ‡ National team caps and goals as of 6 September 2024

Jhegson Sebastián Méndez Carabalí (born 26 April 1997) is an Ecuadorian professional footballer who plays as a midfielder for Independiente del Valle and the Ecuador national team.

== Club career ==
=== Independiente del Valle ===
Méndez joined the Independiente del Valle academy in 2011. By 2014 he had been promoted to the club's B team and made his first-team debut on 7 March 2015 in a victory over L.D.U. Loja in the Serie A Primera Etapa. After two substitute appearances, Méndez was loaned to Cultural Leonesa in Spain, making one substitute appearance for the club on 29 November 2015. Upon his return to the club, Méndez had to wait until gameweek 15 of the 2016 season to play his next game, appearing as a substitute in a defeat to Fuerza Amarilla on 13 May 2016. He followed that up by playing the full 90 minutes in six of the final ten games of the Serie A Primera Etapa and a further 12 appearances in the Segunda Etapa as he cemented himself as a first-team regular.

=== Orlando City ===
On 28 December 2018, Méndez signed to Major League Soccer team Orlando City. He made his debut in the season opener at home to New York City FC on 2 March 2019. In July 2019, Méndez was part of the Orlando City team alongside Nani and Chris Mueller that won the 2019 MLS All-Star Skills Challenge, beating teams from the MLS All-Stars and Atlético Madrid to win the $25,000 prize for charity.

On 7 November 2021, Méndez scored his first goal for the club on his 65th appearance. The goal, a spectacular knuckling 20-yard strike, was the opener in an eventual 2–0 win away at CF Montréal. It was the final match of the regular season in which Orlando entered knowing a draw would guarantee qualification to the 2021 MLS Cup Playoffs.

=== Los Angeles FC ===
On 19 July 2022, Méndez was acquired by Los Angeles FC via trade in exchange for $300,000 of General Allocation Money (GAM). Orlando could receive an additional $450,000 in GAM if certain contract conditions are met and also retained an undisclosed percentage of any future transfer fee.

With LAFC, he won both the Supporters' Shield, after a 3–0 win over Austin FC, and the MLS Cup Final, following a penalty shoot-out win over Philadelphia Union. At the end of the 2022 season, he was released by the club.

=== São Paulo ===
On 9 January 2023, Méndez joined Brazilian club São Paulo on a free transfer, signing a three-year contract. Rarely used in his first season, he was loaned to Spanish Segunda División side Elche on 1 February 2024.

After no longer being part of the main team's plans, Méndez had his contract terminated by mutual consent on 8 January 2025.

=== Return to Independiente del Valle ===
On 21 January 2025, a few days after finalizing the procedures for his termination, Méndez was announced via X (formerly Twitter) as a reinforcement for Independiente del Valle.

== International career ==
Méndez was a member of Ecuador's 2017 South American U-20 Championship squad which reached the final of the tournament.

In October 2018, Méndez was called up to the senior Ecuador national team by manager Hernán Darío Gómez for the first time. He made his debut on 11 September 2018, playing 73 minutes in a 2–0 friendly victory over Guatemala at Toyota Park, Bridgeview, Illinois. In May 2019, he was called into the squad for the 2019 Copa América, his first senior international tournament. After sitting out the first group game, Méndez started against Chile and drew a foul from goalkeeper Gabriel Arias to win a penalty, Ecuador's only goal of a 2–1 defeat. He started the following game, a 1–1 draw with Japan. Ecuador were eliminated after finishing bottom of Group C with one point.

In June 2021, Méndez was named to the final roster for the 2021 Copa América.

Méndez was named in the Ecuadorian squad for the 2022 FIFA World Cup.

== Personal life ==
His uncle is former professional footballer and fellow Ecuadorean international player Édison Méndez.

== Career statistics ==
=== Club ===
As of 2 June 2024

Appearances and goals by club, season and competition
Club	Season	League			State league		Cup		Continental		Other		Total	
Club	Season	Division	Apps	Goals	Apps	Goals	Apps	Apps	Goals	Goals	Apps	Goals	Apps	Goals
Independiente del Valle	2015	Serie A	2	0	—		0	0	0	0	—		2	0
Independiente del Valle	2016	Serie A	19	0	—		0	0	0	0	—		19	0
Independiente del Valle	2017	Serie A	20	1	—		0	0	0	0	—		20	1
Independiente del Valle	2018	Serie A	40	2	—		0	0	2	0	—		42	2
Independiente del Valle	Total		81	3	—		0	0	2	0	0	0	83	3
Cultural Leonesa (loan)	2015–16	Segunda División B	1	0	—		0	0	—		—		1	0
Orlando City	2019	MLS	23	0	—		2	0	—		—		25	0
Orlando City	2020	MLS	19	0	—		—		—		4 (Note: MLS is Back Tournament knockout stage)	0	23	0
Orlando City	2021	MLS	17	1	—		—		1	0	—		18	1
Orlando City	2022	MLS	13	0	—		4	0	—		—		17	0
Orlando City	Total		72	1	—		6	0	1	0	4	0	83	1
Los Angeles FC	2022	MLS	9	0	—		—		—		3 (Note: Appearances in MLS Cup playoffs and Leagues Cup)	0	11	0
São Paulo	2023	Série A	7	0	11	0	4	0	2 (Note: Appearances in Copa Sudamericana)	0	—		23	0
Elche (loan)	2023–24	Segunda División	4	0	—		0	0	—		—		4	0
Career total			174	4	11	0	10	0	5	0	6	0	206	4

=== International ===
As of 6 September 2024

Appearances and goals by national team and year
National team	Year	Apps	Goals
Ecuador	2018	5	0
Ecuador	2019	10	0
Ecuador	2020	1	0
Ecuador	2021	10	0
Ecuador	2022	8	0
Ecuador	2023	2	0
Ecuador	2024	1	0
Total		37	0

== Honours ==
Los Angeles FC

- Supporters' Shield: 2022
- MLS Cup: 2022

São Paulo

- Copa do Brasil: 2023
