= Chris Mueller (soccer) =

American soccer player (born 1996)

Personal information
- Full name: Christopher Matthew Mueller
- Date of birth: August 29, 1996 (age 30)
- Place of birth: Schaumburg, Illinois, US
- Height: 5 ft 9 in (1.75 m)
- Position: Winger

Youth career
- 2004–2013: Chicago Sockers

College career
Years	Team	Apps	(Gls)
2014–2017	Wisconsin Badgers	75	(22)

Senior career*
Years	Team	Apps	(Gls)
2016	Des Moines Menace	2	(0)
2017	Chicago FC United	9	(4)
2018–2021	Orlando City	112	(21)
2022	Hibernian	11	(0)
2022–2026	Chicago Fire	66	(6)
Total		200	(31)

International career
2020–2021	United States	2	(2)
- * Club domestic league appearances and goals

Christopher Matthew Mueller (born August 29, 1996) is an American former professional soccer player who played as a winger. Mueller made two appearances and scored two goals for the United States national team.

Following a collegiate career at the University of Wisconsin–Madison, Mueller was the sixth overall pick of the 2018 MLS SuperDraft, joining Orlando City where he became the club's all-time leading appearance maker during a four-season spell. Mueller joined Scottish club Hibernian in January 2022, but left them after four months and returned to Major League Soccer with Chicago Fire, whom he retired with at age 30 due to health issues.

== Club career ==
=== Youth and college ===
Mueller grew up in Schaumburg, Illinois and played college soccer at the University of Wisconsin from 2014 to 2017, scoring 22 goals in 75 regular season matches. In 2016, Mueller was selected to the All-America third-team and the All-Big Ten first team. In 2017, Mueller was named Big Ten Offensive Player of the Year, as well as being selected to the All-Big Ten first team and the All-America second-team.

=== Orlando City ===
Mueller was drafted as the sixth overall pick of the 2018 MLS SuperDraft by Orlando City SC. He made his professional debut on March 3, 2018, in a season-opening 1–1 draw with D.C. United. On April 8, 2018, Mueller scored his first professional goal against Portland Timbers in a 3–2 victory. On April 21, 2018, Mueller scored the fastest goal in Orlando City history when he scored 63 seconds into a match against the San Jose Earthquakes, and later in the match he recorded his first professional assist. Mueller was runner-up for the 2018 MLS Rookie of the Year Award.

On March 2, 2019, Mueller started in his second consecutive season opener, scoring in a 2–2 against New York City FC. He scored his first U.S. Open Cup goal against the same opposition on July 10, 2019, in a 1–1 quarter-final draw before Orlando progressed to their first ever semi-final on penalties. In July 2019, Mueller was part of the Orlando City team alongside Nani and Sebas Méndez that won the 2019 MLS All-Star Skills Challenge, beating teams from the MLS All-Stars and Atlético Madrid to win the $25,000 prize for charity with Mueller notably the only player to successfully complete a scissors kick during the volleys round.

On March 7, 2020, Mueller scored Orlando's first goal of the season in a 2–1 away loss to Colorado Rapids. With the season affected by the coronavirus pandemic, a return to play was achieved through the MLS is Back Tournament. Mueller scored in the opening game as Orlando beat newly formed rivals Inter Miami CF 2–1 before scoring a brace in the following game, a 3–1 victory over New York City FC. He finished the 2020 season as the team's top scorer with a career-high 10 goals.

On July 17, 2021, Mueller appeared as a substitute in 1–1 draw with Toronto FC. It was his 108th appearance for the club in all competitions, tying the record set by Cristian Higuita in 2019. Entering the final year of his contract in 2021, Mueller had been in contract negotiations with Orlando City but informed the club on July 21, 2021, that he had signed a pre-contract agreement with an unnamed European club and that he would be leaving upon the expiry of his contract at the end of the 2021 season. He broke the club appearance record a day later, starting in a 2–1 win over Philadelphia Union.

=== Hibernian ===
On July 22, 2021, Scottish Premiership side Hibernian announced they had signed Mueller on a free transfer agreement, which would see him join the club on January 1, 2022.

On January 20, 2022, Mueller made his debut for Hibernian in the side's 1–0 win over Cove Rangers in the Scottish Cup. On February 13, 2022, He scored his first goal for the club in a 3–1 win over Arbroath F.C. in the Scottish Cup. This proved to be the only goal Mueller would score for Hibs, and he was allowed to return to the U.S. in May 2022. Hibs chief executive Ben Kensell said that Mueller had struggled to "adapt to the pace and physicality" of Scottish soccer.

=== Chicago Fire ===
On May 5, 2022, MLS side Chicago Fire FC announced they had signed Mueller for an undisclosed fee from Hibernian. On September 4, 2026, Mueller announced that he had retired from professional soccer due to health issues. Mueller cited continuing flare ups of recurring pericarditis as the driving reason behind his decision, writing: "After spending the last two years battling back from six-plus flares of recurrent pericarditis — the ups and downs, the ins and outs, the fears and worries of fighting back for weeks and months at a time, trying to regain my fitness and my confidence to get back to my best — I was ultimately, continuously drawn back by 'another flare'".

== International career ==
In November 2020, having never appeared on any level for the United States national team, Mueller was called up to the United States senior team for a friendly against El Salvador. He made his debut starting the game on December 9, scoring twice, registering one assist and was named man of the match in a 6–0 victory.

== Career statistics ==
=== Club ===
Appearances and goals by club, season and competition
Club	Season	League			National cup (Note: Includes U.S. Open Cup and Scottish Cup)		Continental		Other		Total	
Club	Season	Division	Apps	Goals	Apps	Goals	Apps	Goals	Apps	Goals	Apps	Goals
Orlando City	2018	MLS	32	3	2	0	—		—		34	3
Orlando City	2019	MLS	29	5	4	1	—		—		33	6
Orlando City	2020	MLS	22	10	—		—		6 (Note: Four appearances in MLS is Back Tournament knockout stage, two appearances in MLS Cup Playoffs)	0	28	10
Orlando City	2021	MLS	29	3	—		—		2 (Note: One appearance in Leagues Cup, one appearance in MLS Cup Playoffs)	0	31	3
Orlando City	Total		112	21	6	1	—		8	0	126	22
Hibernian	2021–22	Scottish Premiership	11	0	4	1	—		—		15	1
Chicago Fire	2022	MLS	24	4	—		—		—		24	4
Chicago Fire	2023	MLS	10	2	1	0	—		—		11	2
Chicago Fire	2024	MLS	27	0	—		—		—		27	0
Chicago Fire	2025	MLS	0	0	0	0	—		0	0	0	0
Chicago Fire	2026	MLS	5	0	0	0	—		0	0	5	0
Chicago Fire	Total		66	6	1	0	0	0	—		67	6
Career total			189	27	11	2	0	0	8	0	205	29

=== International ===
United States
Year	Apps	Goals
2020	1	2
2021	1	0
Total	2	2

As of match played December 9, 2020. United States score listed first, score column indicates score after each Mueller goal.

No.	Date	Venue	Cap	Opponent	Score	Result	Competition
1	December 9, 2020	DRV PNK Stadium, Fort Lauderdale, United States	1	El Salvador	2–0	6–0	Friendly
2	December 9, 2020	DRV PNK Stadium, Fort Lauderdale, United States	1	El Salvador	4–0	6–0	Friendly
