= Antonio Delamea Mlinar =

Slovenian footballer (born 1991)

- Delamea Mlinar (in the middle) in 2018

Personal information
- Date of birth: 10 June 1991 (age 35)
- Place of birth: Celje, SR Slovenia, Yugoslavia
- Height: 1.86 m (6 ft 1 in)
- Position: Centre-back

Youth career
- Mozirje
- –2006: Šampion
- 2006–2008: Aluminij
- 2008–2009: Interblock

Senior career*
| Years | Team | Apps | (Gls) |
| 2008–2011 | Interblock | 23 | (1) |
| 2011–2017 | Olimpija Ljubljana | 96 | (4) |
| 2017–2020 | New England Revolution | 69 | (3) |
| 2021–2022 | Olimpija Ljubljana | 23 | (4) |
| Total | | 211 | (12) |

International career
| 2007–2008 | Slovenia U17 | 10 | (0) |
| 2008 | Slovenia U18 | 5 | (1) |
| 2008–2009 | Slovenia U19 | 7 | (1) |
| 2010–2012 | Slovenia U21 | 9 | (0) |
| 2016–2017 | Slovenia | 2 | (0) |
| 2017–2019 | Slovenia B | 2 | (0) |
- * Club domestic league appearances and goals

Antonio Delamea Mlinar (born 10 June 1991) is a Slovenian retired footballer who played as a defender. Delamea Mlinar started his career with Interblock, where he played for three seasons. He spent the bulk of his career with Olimpija Ljubljana during two separate stints and also played three seasons for the New England Revolution of Major League Soccer. Internationally, he represented the Slovenia national team, earning two caps. Following his retirement in 2022, he has moved into coaching.

== Club career ==
=== Interblock ===
In 2008, he made his senior career debut for Interblock. During that season, he appeared in 12 games and recorded his first assist on 4 October. He missed the following year due to injury. During the 2010–11 season, he made 16 starts across all competitions for Interblock. He scored his first senior goal on 13 March 2011 in a 2–2 draw with Šenčur.

=== Olimpija Ljubljana ===
He joined Olimpija Ljubljana prior to the 2011–12 season, and made seven appearances for the club during the year. The following season, he made a career-high 31 starts across all competitions and scored his first goal with the club on 18 August 2012, in a 2–2 draw with Celje. He scored another goal the following year on 28 July, in a 5–0 win over Krka. During the 2015–16 campaign, Delamea Mlinar only appeared in three games due to injury, and scored one goal in the season finale as Olimpija won their first PrvaLiga title. In 2016–17, he was named team captain and made 20 appearances, scoring his final goal with Olimpija in December 2016 in a 4–1 win against Radomlje.

=== New England Revolution ===
Delamea Mlinar in 2018

In January 2017, Delamea Mlinar signed with the New England Revolution of Major League Soccer. He scored his first goal for the club on 17 June 2017 in a 2–1 loss to Chicago Fire. He is the first Slovenian player sign and play for an MLS club. He made a quick impact for the Revolution and was named to the MLS team of the week for two consecutive weeks in both week five and six of that season. During the 2018 season he appeared in 18 matches, all starts at the centre-back position.

Delamea Mlinar returned to the Revolution for the 2019 season, where he missed multiple games with a hamstring injury. During their 17 March game against Toronto FC, he made his 50th MLS start and appeared in 17 total games that year, scoring two goals and one assist, helping the Revolution reach the MLS Cup playoffs. He once again made team of the week during week 21 of the season.

=== Return to Olimpija Ljubljana ===
After only appearing in four games with the Revolution in 2020, they opted not to renew his contract for the 2021 season. He then returned to Olimpija Ljubljana in January 2021; during his second tenure with the club, he appeared in 23 league games and scored four goals.

Following the 2022 season, Delamea Mlinar announced his retirement from football due to injuries.

== International career ==
In November 2016, Delamea Mlinar received his first call-up to the senior Slovenia squad for the matches against Malta and Poland. He made his debut in a friendly match against Poland on 14 November, as a replacement for Miral Samardžić.

== Coaching career ==
Following his retirement, Delamea Mlinar has remained a member of Olimpija Ljubljana, joining the coaching staff of their under-17 team. He was later promoted to head coach of the under-17s.

In 2024, he served as an assistant coach for Muamer Vugdalić with the Slovenia under-17 team.

== Personal life ==
Delamea Mlinar and his wife Ingrid have three children. He received a permanent resident card in February 2018, which qualified him as a domestic player for MLS roster purposes.

He is an avid basketball fan and regularly attended Boston Celtics games when he was a member of the New England Revolution.

== Honours ==
Interblock

- Slovenian Cup: 2008–09

Olimpija Ljubljana

- Slovenian PrvaLiga: 2015–16
- Slovenian Cup: 2020–21

Individual

- New England Revolution Defender of the Year: 2017
