= Suriname at the World Athletics Championships =

- Flag of Suriname
- WA code: SUR
- Medals: Gold 0 Silver 1 Bronze 1 Total 2

World Athletics Championships appearances (overview)
- 1987; 1991; 1993; 1995; 1997; 1999; 2001; 2003; 2005; 2007; 2009; 2011; 2013; 2015; 2017; 2019; 2022; 2023; 2025

Suriname has taken part in 17 editions of the World Athletics Championships, only being absent in 1993 and 2022. They have won two medals, one silver and one bronze, both by Letitia Vriesde in the 800 meters event. The other finalists positions the country have achieved were also by Letitia.

== Medalists ==
Medal	Name	Year	Event
Silver	Letitia Vriesde	1995 Seville	Women's 800 metres
Bronze	Letitia Vriesde	2001 Seville	Women's 800 metres

=== By event ===
Event	Gold	Silver	Bronze	Total
800 meters	0	1	1	2
Totals (1 entries)	0	1	1	2

=== By gender ===
Gender	Gold	Silver	Bronze	Total
Women	0	1	1	2
Men	0	0	0	0

== See also ==
- Suriname at the Olympics
- Suriname at the Paralympics
