= Suriname at the 2023 World Athletics Championships =

- Flag of Suriname
- WA code: SUR
- National federation: Suriname Athletics Federation
- Website: surinaamseatletiekbond.com

in Budapest, Hungary 19 August 2023 – 27 August 2023
- Competitors: 1 (1 man and 0 women) in 2 events
- Medals: Gold 0 Silver 0 Bronze 0 Total 0

World Athletics Championships appearances (overview)
- 1987; 1991; 1993; 1995; 1997; 1999; 2001; 2003; 2005; 2007; 2009; 2011; 2013; 2015; 2017; 2019; 2022; 2023; 2025

Suriname was set to compete at the 2023 World Athletics Championships in Budapest, Hungary, which were held from 19 to 27 August 2023. The athlete delegation of the country was originally of one competitor, sprinter Issam Asinga, who would compete in the men's 100 metres and men's 200 metres. He qualified for the Championships after reaching the entry standards of both events. Though, Assinga was then provisionally suspended due to the presence of an experimental drug in his urine sample, thus leading to Suriname's non-participation at the Championships.

== Background ==
The 2023 World Athletics Championships in Budapest, Hungary, were held from 19 to 27 August 2023. The Championships were held at the National Athletics Centre. To qualify for the World Championships, athletes had to reach an entry standard (e.g. time or distance), place in a specific position at select competitions, be a wild card entry, or qualify through their World Athletics Ranking at the end of the qualification period.

Sprinter Issam Asinga was set to be the sole representative for the nation at the championships. The direct qualification period of the event was from 31 July 2022 to 30 July 2023. He first qualified for the men's 200 metres on 8 April 2023 after running in a time of 20.11 seconds in the distance at the Hurricane Alumni Invitational held in Coral Gables, United States, which was in the entry standard of 20.16 seconds. He then qualified for the men's 100 metres after setting a new world U20 record with 9.89 seconds at the 2023 South American Championships in Athletics held in São Paulo, Brazil, which was in the entry standard of 10 seconds.

== Results ==
Though set to compete, Asinga later tested positive for the presence of an experimental drug in his urine sample and was provisionally suspended. He did not compete in either of the events he had originally qualified in.

Key

- Q = Qualified for the next round
- q = Qualified for the next round as a fastest loser or, in field events, by position without achieving the qualifying target
- NR = National record
- PB = Personal best
- SB = Season best
- NM = No mark
- N/A = Round not applicable for the event

=== Men ===
==== Track and road events ====
Athlete	Event	Heat		Semifinal		Final	
Athlete	Event	Result	Rank	Result	Rank	Result	Rank
Issam Asinga	100 metres	DNS		Did not advance			
Issam Asinga	200 metres	DNS		Did not advance			
