= 2017 Orlando City B season =

Orlando City B
2017 season
- Head coach: Anthony Pulis
- Stadium: Orlando City Stadium
- USL: Conference: 9th place
- USL Playoffs: Did not Qualify
Home colors	Away colors

The 2017 Orlando City B season was the club's second year of existence, and their second season in the Eastern Conference of the competition then known as the United Soccer League and now as the USL Championship, the second tier of the United States soccer pyramid. It was their first and ultimately only year playing in the new Orlando City Stadium in Downtown Orlando.

This was OCB's final season in the second tier of American soccer as at the end of the year OCB's MLS parent club, Orlando City SC, announced that their USL affiliate would not participate in the 2018 USL season. The team would later announce their intention to become a founding member of the new third-tier USL League One in 2019.

== Roster ==
As of April 25, 2017

No.	Position	Nation	Player
6	MF	CAN	Richie Laryea (GA; on loan from Orlando City SC)
12	DF	USA	Kevin Alston (on loan from Orlando City SC)
13	FW	SEN	Hadji Barry (on loan from Orlando City SC)
19	FW	GUI	Moussa Sane (on loan from Orlando City SC)
23	DF	USA	Conor Donovan (on loan from Orlando City SC)
24	MF	ENG	Lewis Neal
28	DF	USA	Tommy Redding (on loan from Orlando City SC)
30	MF	ENG	Danny Deakin
36	GK	USA	Earl Edwards, Jr. (on loan from Orlando City SC)
41	MF	CAN	Jordan Schweitzer
42	DF	CAN	Zach Ellis-Hayden
45	FW	ENG	Ben Polk
46	MF	ENG	Paul Clowes
47	DF	CMR	Jules Youmeni
63	MF	USA	Scott Thomsen
70	GK	USA	Jake Fenlason
71	DF	USA	Zach Carroll
77	FW	USA	Austin Martz
79	DF	BRA	Fernando Timbó
80	MF	USA	Ryley Kraft
90	FW	CMR	Albert Dikwa
94	DF	BRA	PC (on loan from Orlando City SC)
95	DF	BRA	Léo Pereira (on loan from Atlético Paranaense)
96	FW	USA	Joe Gallardo
98	FW	USA	Pierre da Silva (on loan from Orlando City SC)
99	FW	CAN	Michael Cox

On October 18, 2017, OCB declined the options of defenders Zach Ellis-Hayden, Zach Carroll and Timbó; midfielders Jordan Schweitzer, Danny Deakin and Austin Martz; and forward Michael Cox. Additionally, the contracts of goalkeeper Jake Fenlason, defender Scott Thomsen and midfielders Paul Clowes and Lewis Neal expired.

== Competitions ==
=== USL Regular season ===
==== Standings ====
Pos	Team	Pld	W	D	L	GF	GA	GD	Pts	Qualification
7	New York Red Bulls II	32	13	5	14	57	60	−3	44	Conference Playoffs
8	Bethlehem Steel FC	32	12	8	12	46	45	+1	44	Conference Playoffs
9	Orlando City B	32	10	12	10	37	36	+1	42	
10	Ottawa Fury	32	8	14	10	42	41	+1	38	
11	Harrisburg City Islanders	32	10	7	15	28	47	−19	37	

Source: 2017 USL standings
Rules for classification: 1) total wins; 2) total goal differential; 3) total goals scored; 4) points earned against top four Conference finishers; 5) disciplinary points; 6) coin toss or drawing of lots

==== Match results ====
Win Draw Loss

March 25 1	Tampa Bay Rowdies	1–0	Orlando City B	St. Petersburg, Florida
7:30 P.M. EDT (UTC−4)	Hristov 57' (pen.), (yellow card) 60'	Report	Neal (yellow card) 36'; Cox (yellow card) 90+4'	Stadium: Al Lang Stadium; Attendance: 7,710; Referee: Ted Unkel

March 30 2	Orlando City B	1–3	Louisville City FC	Orlando, Florida
7:30 P.M. EDT (UTC−4)	Morad 42' (o.g.); Cox (yellow card) 58'; Pereira (yellow card) 90+3'	Report	Lancaster 11'; Davis IV 57'; Spencer 76'	Stadium: Orlando City Stadium; Attendance: 2,741; Referee: Marcos de Oliveira

April 4 3	Orlando City B	3–1	Toronto FC II	Orlando, Florida
7:30 P.M. EDT (UTC−4)	Clowes (yellow card) 16', (goal) 18'; Carroll (yellow card) 38'; Barry 41'; Neal 51'; Laryea (yellow card) 55' da Silva (red card) 69'	Report	Johnson 30'; Brandon Onkony (yellow card) 57'	Stadium: Orlando City Stadium; Attendance: 1,098; Referee: Jonathan Weiner

April 8 4	Orlando City B	1–1	Charlotte Independence	Orlando, Florida
6:30 P.M. EDT (UTC−4)	Kraft (yellow card) 11'; Ellis-Hayden (yellow card) 50'; Laryea (yellow card) 66'; Dikwa 70', (yellow card) 90+1'; Schweitzer (yellow card) 75'	Report	Ross (yellow card) 20'; Hilton 60'; Herrera (yellow card) 79'	Stadium: Orlando City Stadium; Attendance: 1,512; Referee: Esteban Rosano

April 14 5	New York Red Bulls II	3–1	Orlando City B	Montclair, New Jersey
7:00 P.M. EDT (UTC−4)	Flemmings 16'; Bezecourt 45+3'; Abidor 87'	Report	Dikwa 34'	Stadium: MSU Soccer Park; Attendance: 722; Referee: Lorant Varga

April 18 6	Harrisburg City Islanders	1–1	Orlando City B	Harrisburg, Pennsylvania
18:30 EDT (UTC−4)	Calvano 80'; Thomas (yellow card) 90+1'	Report	Sane (yellow card) 9'; Martz (yellow card) 45+1'; Carroll 90+3'	Stadium: FNB Field; Attendance: 2,013; Referee: Jorge Ramírez

April 23 7	Bethlehem Steel FC	0–2	Orlando City B	Bethlehem, Pennsylvania
4:00 P.M. EDT (UTC−4)	Trusty (yellow card) 45+2'; Burke (yellow card) 47'; Jones (yellow card) 68'; Wijnaldum (yellow card) 70'	Report	Laryea (yellow card) 38' (goal) 49', 71'; Ellis-Hayden (yellow card) 87'	Stadium: Goodman Stadium; Attendance: 2,976; Referee: Henrik Karlsson

April 27 8	Orlando City B	0–0	Saint Louis FC	Orlando, Florida
7:30 P.M. EDT (UTC−4)	Da Silva (yellow card) 53'	Report (USL)	Plewa (yellow card) 52'; David (yellow card) 70'	Stadium: Orlando City Stadium; Attendance: 1,008; Referee: Caleb Mendez

May 13 9	FC Cincinnati	0–2	Orlando City B	Cincinnati, Ohio
5:00 P.M. EDT (UTC−4)	Bahner (yellow card) 15'; Quinn (yellow card) 35'; König (yellow card) 39'; McLaughlin (yellow card) 58'; Bone (yellow card) 67'	CIN Report; OCB Report; Box Score	Hines (yellow card) 33' da Silva 75' (pen.); Laryea (yellow card) 80' (goal) 90+1'; Donovan (yellow card) 90+3'	Stadium: Nippert Stadium; Attendance: 19,310; Referee: Calin Radosav; Assistant referees: Benjamin Hall-Volpenhein; Matthew Fotia; Fourth official: Benjamin Miller

May 27 10	Orlando City B	1–3	Charlotte Independence	Orlando, Florida
6:30 P.M. EDT (UTC−4)	Dikwa 20'; Laryea (yellow card) 53'; Rocha (yellow card) 78'	Report	Smith (yellow card) 14'; A. Martinez (yellow card) 28'; Estrada 40'; Ross (yellow card) 42'; E. Martinez 45'; Herrera 51'; Johnson (yellow card) 69'	Stadium: Orlando City Stadium; Attendance: 1,098; Referee: Ismir Pekmic

June 3 11	Pittsburgh Riverhounds	1–2	Orlando City B	Pittsburgh, Pennsylvania
7:00 P.M. EDT (UTC−4)	Hertzog 30', (yellow card) 73'; Washington (yellow card) 79'	Report	Ellis-Hayden (yellow card) 37', (goal) 53'; Barry 42'	Stadium: Highmark Stadium; Attendance: 3,187; Referee: Danielle Chesky

June 7 12	Orlando City B	1–1	Rochester Rhinos	Orlando, Florida
6:30 P.M. EDT (UTC−4)	Hines (yellow card) 3'; Barry 23'; Laryea (yellow card) 64'	Report	Correia 25'; Fall (yellow card) 63'	Stadium: Orlando City Stadium; Attendance: 967; Referee: Jonathan Weiner

June 14 13	Toronto FC II	1–0	Orlando City B	Vaughan, Ontario
12:00 P.M. EDT (UTC−4)	Hamilton 9'	Report	Carroll (yellow card) 56'; Donovan (yellow card) 84'	Stadium: Ontario Soccer Centre; Attendance: 1,295; Referee: Pierre-Luc Lauziere

June 20 14	Ottawa Fury	1–0	Orlando City B	Ottawa, Ontario
11:00 A.M. EDT (UTC-04:00)	Dos Santos 43'	Report	Ellis-Hayden (yellow card) 17'; Schweitzer (yellow card) 25'; Carroll (yellow card) 90+2'	Stadium: TD Place Stadium; Attendance: 7,551; Referee: David Barrie

June 23 15	Rochester Rhinos	0–1	Orlando City B	Rochester, New York
6:00 P.M. EDT (UTC-04:00)	Defregger (yellow card) 29'; Dover (yellow card) 88'	Report	Timbó 18', (yellow card) 45+1'	Stadium: Capelli Sport Stadium; Attendance: 1,243; Referee: Charles Murphy

July 1 16	Orlando City B	1–1	FC Cincinnati	Orlando, Florida
8:30 P.M. EDT (UTC−4)	Schweitzer 2'; Hines (yellow card) 45+1'; Clowes (yellow card) 46' da Silva (red card) 87'	Report	Djiby 16'; Berry (yellow card) 75'	Stadium: Orlando City Stadium; Attendance: 980; Referee: Lorant Varga

July 8 17	Orlando City B	0–0	Pittsburgh Riverhounds	Orlando, Florida
7:30 P.M. EDT (UTC−4)	Timbó (yellow card) 78'	Report	Earls (yellow card) 60'; Green (yellow card) 71'; Washington (yellow card) 84'	Stadium: Orlando City Stadium; Attendance: 1,042; Referee: Elvis Osmanovic

July 13 18	Orlando City B	1–1	Tampa Bay Rowdies	Orlando, Florida
7:30 A.M. EDT (UTC−4)	Pereira (yellow card) 74'; Clowes (yellow card) 90+2'; Deakin 90+6' (pen.); Laryea (yellow card) 90+7'	Report	Paterson 21'; King (yellow card) 43'; Morrell (yellow card) 45'	Stadium: Orlando City Stadium; Attendance: 1,504; Referee: Kevin Broadley

July 29 19	Charleston Battery	0–0	Orlando City B	Charleston, South Carolina
7:00 P.M. EDT (UTC−4)	Lasso (yellow card) 65'; Kunga (yellow card) 84'; Portillo (yellow card) 90+1'	Report	Hines (yellow card) 5'; Clowes (yellow card) 90'; Ellis-Hayden (yellow card) 90+1'	Stadium: MUSC Health Stadium; Attendance: 2,853; Referee: Gustavo Solorio

August 2 20	Orlando City B	0–0	Harrisburg City Islanders	Orlando, Florida
7:30 P.M. EDT (UTC−4)		Report	Calvano (yellow card) 51'	Stadium: Orlando City Stadium; Attendance: 1,061; Referee: Jonathan Weiner

August 5 21	FC Cincinnati	2–2	Orlando City B	Cincinnati, Ohio
7:00 P.M. EDT (UTC-04:00)	Greig 6'; Quinn (yellow card) 42'; König (yellow card) 90+2'	Report	Ellis-Hayden (yellow card) 8'; Martz 14'; Hines (yellow card) 45+1'; Barry 55'	Stadium: Nippert Stadium; Attendance: 25,308; Referee: Bardhyl Pashaj

August 12 22	Richmond Kickers	0–1	Orlando City B	Richmond, Virginia
7:00 P.M. EDT (UTC−4)	Asante (yellow card) 41'; Tayou (yellow card) 71'; Luiz Fernando (yellow card) 74'; Yomby (yellow card) 81'; Sekyere (yellow card) 86'	Report	Barry 24'; Carroll (yellow card) 28', (yellow card) 90' (red card); Rocha (yellow card) 54'	Stadium: City Stadium; Attendance: 3,157; Referee: Lorant Varga

August 16 23	Orlando City B	3–0	Ottawa Fury	Orlando, Florida
7:00 EDT (UTC-04:00)	Hines 34'; Timbó (yellow card) 53'; Barry 60', 71'; Ellis-Hayden (yellow card) 80'	Report	Dos Santos (yellow card) 75'	Stadium: Orlando City Stadium; Referee: Henrik Karlsson

August 19 24	Charlotte Independence	1–1	Orlando City B	Charlotte, North Carolina
6:00 P.M. EDT (UTC−4)	Estrada 7'	Report	Barry 5' (pen.), (yellow card) 90+2'; Clowes (yellow card) 53'; Carroll (yellow card) 56'	Stadium: Matthews Sportsplex; Attendance: 1,467; Referee: Greg Dopka

August 26 25	Louisville City FC	0–3	Orlando City B	Louisville, Kentucky
7:30 P.M. EDT (UTC−4)	Reynolds (yellow card) 14'; Davis IV (yellow card) 73'; Jimenez (yellow card) 89'	Report	Cox 15', 27'; Timbó 53', (yellow card) 81'; Neal (yellow card) 90'	Stadium: Louisville Slugger Field; Attendance: 8,251; Referee: Calin Radosav

August 31 26	Orlando City B	1–1	Bethlehem Steel FC	Orlando, Florida
7:30 P.M. EDT (UTC−4)	Alston (yellow card) 30'; Da Silva (yellow card) 45+1' (goal) 75'	Box Score	Epps 86'; Chambers (yellow card) 90+1'	Stadium: Orlando City Stadium; Attendance: 856; Referee: Daniel Gutierrez

September 7 27	Orlando City B	0–2	Richmond Kickers	Orlando, Florida
4:30 P.M. EDT (UTC−4)	Schweitzer (yellow card) 22'	Report	Minutillo 40'; Jane 45'; Bolduc (yellow card) 54'	Stadium: Orlando City Stadium; Attendance: 791; Referee: Jonathan Bilinski
Note: Kickoff moved from 19:30 to 16:30 due to Hurricane Irma.

September 16 28	Saint Louis FC	2–0	Orlando City B	Fenton, Missouri
8:30 P.M. EDT (UTC−4)	Howe 10'; Cochran (yellow card) 42'; Ledbetter (yellow card) 49', (yellow card) 54' (red card); Volesky 62' (pen.); Charpie (yellow card) 90+4'	Report	Thomsen (yellow card) 89' da Silva (yellow card) 90'; Neal (yellow card) 90+2'	Stadium: World Wide Technology Soccer Park; Attendance: 4,456; Referee: Danielle Chesky

September 23 29	Orlando City B	2–1	Charleston Battery	Orlando, Florida
6:30 P.M. EDT (UTC−4)	da Silva 31'; Clowes (yellow card) 50'; Carroll (yellow card) 70'; Neal 87'	Report	Griffith (yellow card) 60'; Cordovés 81'	Stadium: Orlando City Stadium; Attendance: 1,011; Referee: Elvis Osmanovic

October 1 30	Richmond Kickers	0–1	Orlando City B	Richmond, Virginia
5:00 P.M. EDT (UTC−4)	Jane (yellow card) 24'; Yomby (yellow card) 45'; Luiz Fernando (yellow card) 45'; Umar (red card) 90'	Report	Barry 80'; Rocha (yellow card) 45'	Stadium: City Stadium; Attendance: 6,582; Referee: Jose Lara

October 7 31	Orlando City B	5–6	New York Red Bulls II	Orlando, Florida
7:30 P.M. EDT (UTC−4)	Neal 16'; Donovan (yellow card) 28'; Carroll 67'; Timbó 77'; Ellis-Hayden (yellow card) 80'; Barry 90+1' (pen.); Martz 90+2'	Report	Bonomo 3', 41', 51'; Valot 12', 87' (pen.); Kutler (yellow card) 43'; Basuljevic 55'; Ndam (yellow card) 76'; Abidor (red card) 90+1'	Stadium: Orlando City Stadium; Attendance: 1,009; Referee: Guido Gonzalez

October 12 32	Orlando City B	0–2	Tampa Bay Rowdies	Orlando, Florida
7:30 P.M. EDT (UTC−4)	da Silva (yellow card) 76'	Report	Vingaard (yellow card) 38'; Portillos (yellow card) 51'; Hristov 74'; Gorskie (yellow card) 80'; Guenzatti 90+3'	Stadium: Orlando City Stadium; Attendance: 1,185; Referee: Jonathan Bilinski
