= Asinga =

Asinga is a surname. Notable people with the surname include:

- Issam Asinga (born 2004), Surinamese sprinter
- Tommy Asinga (born 1968), Surinamese 800m runner
