= André Kamperveen Stadion =

Football stadium in Paramaribo, Suriname

- National Stadion
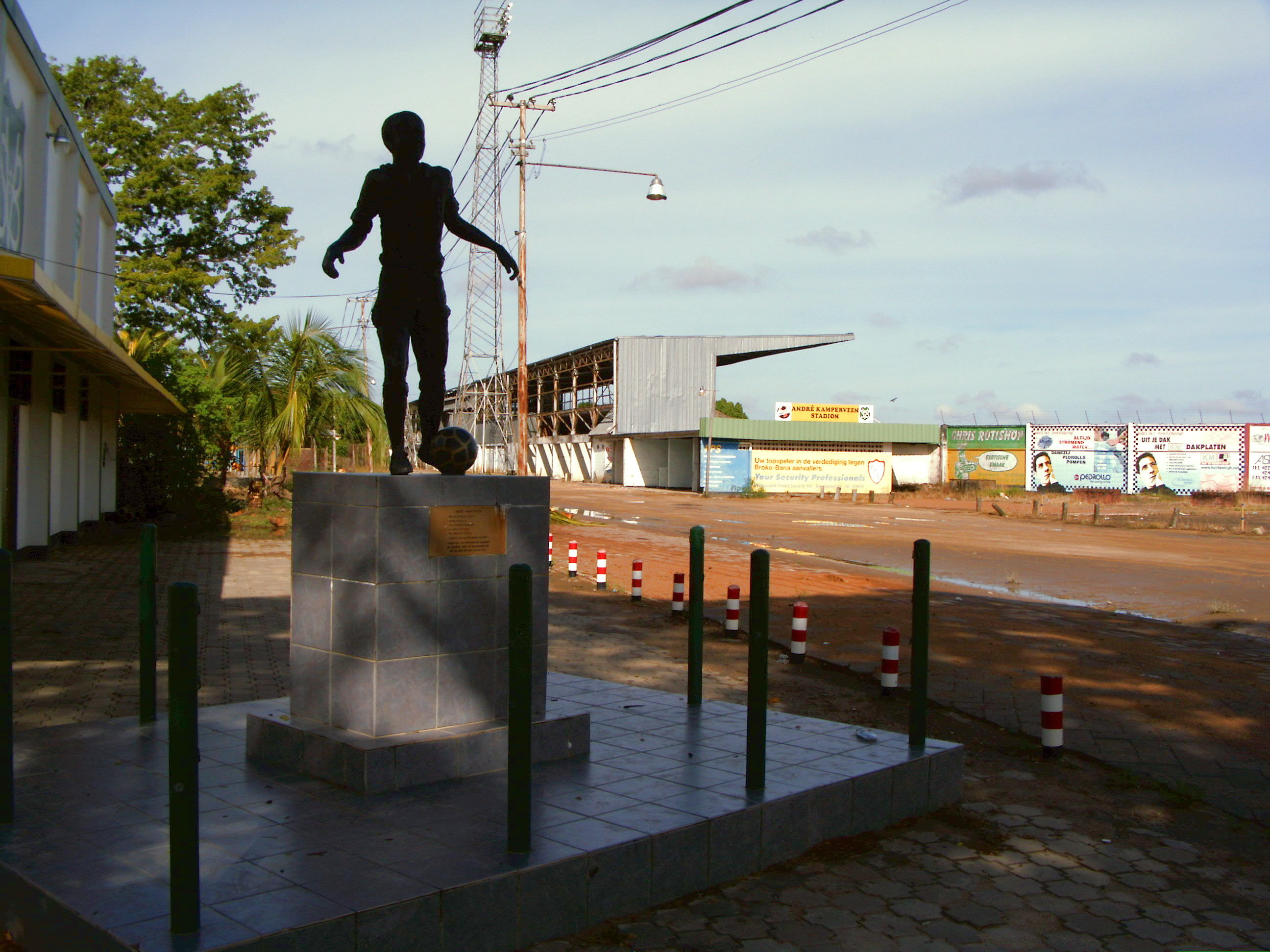
- Interactive map of André Kamperveen Stadion
- Former names: National Stadion; Suriname Stadion
- Location: Paramaribo, Suriname
- Coordinates: 5°50′14.6″N 55°09′38.9″W
- Owner: City and District of Paramaribo
- Operator: Surinaamse Voetbal Bond
- Capacity: 7,100
- Surface: Grass

Construction
- Opened: August 29, 1953; 73 years ago
- Cost: ƒ 310.000,00
- Architect: Nagel

Tenants
- Suriname national football team (1953–); Suriname Athletics (1953–); Suriname Cycling (1953–); Transvaal (1953–); Robinhood (1953–2014); Walking Boyz Company (1997–2014, 2016–); Bintang Lair (2021–)

André Kamperveen Stadium, formerly the National Stadion, is a multi-purpose stadium in Paramaribo, Suriname. Since its opening in 1953, the stadium has been the official home stadium of both football teams S.V. Transvaal and S.V. Robinhood and the official national stadium of the Suriname national football team. With an official capacity of 7,100, it is the largest stadium in Suriname.

The stadium is also home to the Suriname Athletics Federation (SAB) as well as the Suriname Cycling Union (SWU). In 1997 Walking Boyz Company joined Transvaal and Robinhood as the third football team to make the stadium their home. In 2014 both Robinhood and Walking Boyz Company relocated to the Frank Essed Stadion, with Robinhood ending a 51-year tenure at the Stadium.

The stadium is named after André Kamperveen, the first president of the Caribbean Football Union.

== Location ==
André Kamperveen Stadion is located in Rainville, Paramaribo on the Stadionlaan, right off the Letitia Vriesdelaan, next door to the office building of the Surinamese Football Association, and across the street from the playing fields 'Owru Cul' which served as the predecessor of the current stadium on the Cultuurtuinlaan from 1923 to 1953.

== History ==
The André Kamperveen Stadium, formerly the National Stadium and later the Suriname stadium, is the largest sports facility in Suriname. It opened on August 29, 1953 with a grand ceremonial opening, but prior to this event, there was the construction of another sports field on the Cultuurtuinlaan with a long history behind it, namely the 'Owru Cul'.

=== Early history ===
Before August 1911, the majority of football matches and events in Paramaribo were organized on the former Gouvernementsplein, now known as the Eenheidsplein. On 15 August 1911 however, a majority vote had ruled to ban the sport from this location, deeming the sport unfit for the locality, since the popular view was that the matches obstructed peoples ability to relax and take walks in the park. Although the ruling interfered with the development of the sport at the time, occasional matches were still held on this square. Obtaining a license to be allowed to do so from the Government proved to be very difficult for football organizing bodies at the time. Due to the loss of the Gouvernementsplein, football associations were forced to look elsewhere, with a need for a new field spiking in 1915.

The Support Committee promised to include the construction of a sports field in its program, but little was noticed of this incentive. During the public debate on the budget of 1916, the desirability of a ground given by Mr Asch van Wijck was referenced. On 12 June 1915, Mr. Van der Upwich wrote in an article for ‘Op den Uitkijk’, where he wrote about the planning of the sports terrain, offering the Gouvernementsstalweide or the Veemarkt as possible alternative construction sites. Edgar Wijngaarde too shared his vision for a new ground in several articles published in the 'Surinamer'.

In June 1915, Governor Van Asbeck (1911–1916) denied the SVB's request to build a facility on a graveyard located on the Gravenstraat that had been closed for 40 years. Another location that was considered in 1915 was the Molenpad, where plans for a cycling track had been discussed as well.

In 1917 the former SVB had made an attempt to obtain 20,400 m^{2} of land on the Cultuurtuinlaan, where the Stadium stands today. Looking to finalize a 75-year lease agreement with the Government, the proposal could not be serviced since the former association had since folded.

On 25 July 1919 the Katholieke Sport Centrale (English, Catholic Sport Center) was founded on the Patronaatterrein in hopes to remedy the problem that was created in 1911. During this period a fierce fight between Catholics and Protestants had erupted in the country which was especially felt during sporting events, particularly at the newly established Katholieke Sport Centrale, where Protestant athletes felt the Catholic clubs and players were given an unfair advantage.

=== Cultuurtuinlaan ===
In 1921, Mr. Walther Hewitt expressed interest in the Cultuurtuinlaan. He inspired Dr. E. Snellen, the director of agriculture in Suriname, to build a sportscomplex on the site. Mr. Hewitt then supervised the completion of the first sporting complex on the Cultuurtuinlaan. The initial cost of ƒ10.000,00 was projected, while only ƒ9.600,00 were used to complete construction.

In 1922 it was voted that the Sports complex by ceded to the Surinamese Sports Committee (SSC). The terrain was nicknamed ‘Het huis van de neutralen (English, The house of the neutrals), implying that it was free of any dogmatic stigma.

On 29 July 1923, the sports terrain 'Owru Cul' was opened by Governor Heemstra in front of a crowd of 2,400 people. The opening ceremony ensued as follows. At 16:45 Governor Heemstra made his entrance to the Wilhelmus sung by Jong Elto. Led by a military trooper, the members of the various sports clubs marched in, with their heads turned to the left to salute the Governor as they walked along the tribune.

During the ceremony, 10 football clubs, 3 korfball clubs, five athletic clubs and a couple of cricket clubs were present. After marching around the complex, the team members took their places as Mr. Simons, chairman of the SCC and Governor Heemstra delivered a speech and gave a toast. Afterwards the first sports clubs got their turn, with the athletic clubs Thesos, Tonido, UNI and Wilhelmina taking their turns.

On Sunday, 5 August 1923 the first football matches were held at the Cul. Listed below are the results of the inaugural games.

==== Inaugural games ====
5 August 1923	Transvaal	2–0	Juliana	Cultuurtuinlaan, Paramaribo
12:45 SRT		Report		Attendance: 2,400

5 August 1923	Voorwaarts	1–1	Excelsior	Cultuurtuinlaan, Paramaribo
15:15 SRT		Report		Attendance: 2,400

5 August 1923	Olympia	5–0	UDI	Cultuurtuinlaan, Paramaribo
17:45 SRT		Report		Attendance: 2,400

5 August 1923	Tonido	1–0	Vlaamse Leeuw	Cultuurtuinlaan, Paramaribo
20:15 SRT		Report		Attendance: 2,400

=== Construction ===
In June 1952 permission was given to John Zeegelaar, who was goalkeeper for Spes Patriae at the time, to build a football stadium in the Cul for quoting the lowest cost of construction at ƒ 175.000,00 guilders. The construction was completed in August 1953, with an International sports week organized for the opening ceremony revolving around athletics, cycling and football.

=== Foundation ===
The opening ceremony of the Suriname Stadion began on Saturday, 29 August 1953, a sports week where the Athletes, Cyclists and Footballers all gave an excellent performance.

The results of the football matches during the inauguration week are as follows.

==== Inaugural games ====
29 August 1953	Suriname (Netherlands)	3–3	(Netherlands) Aruba	National Stadium, Paramaribo
20:00 SRT	Kamperveen; Nelom; Hoen	Report		Attendance: 6,000

1 September 1953	Suriname (Netherlands)	5–4	(Brazil) Paysandu Sport Club	National Stadium, Paramaribo
18:00 SRT	Kamperveen; Kruin; U A Sai; Hoen	Report		Attendance: 6,000

1 September 1953	Suriname (Netherlands)	3–3	(Netherlands) Aruba	National Stadium, Paramaribo
20:15 SRT	Kamperveen	Report		Attendance: 6,000

=== Conflict of 1953 ===
The relationship between the national associations for athletics, cycling and football have been strained since construction of the stadium was completed in August 1953. The governing body of football Surinaamse Voetbal Bond (SVB), the governing body of athletics Surinaamse Atletiek Bond (SAB) and the governing body of cycling, the Surinaamse Wielren Unie (SWU) have faced difficulties since before the stadium was even opened. Scheduling disparities have caused for the associations to quarrel since day one.

The difficulties between the associations started on Monday, 24 August 1953 when the Surinamese Football Association noticed that no time to practice was given ahead the inaugural games. After which the SVB declared that the other associations should stay away until after the games. Emanuels the chairman of the SWU held a meeting with Emile De La Fuente, chairman of the SVB at the time, after which De La Fuente went to the press and declared that the cycling association had agreed to vacate the stadium from Monday, August 24 onward for the duration of the period ahead of the inaugural games. The governing body of football then locked the doors to the stadium. Emanuels explained that he had agreed that the cyclists could train outside the stadium, but that it was important for the athletes and cyclists to be equally prepared ahead of the event.

All this of course only complicated the relationship between the two governing bodies. As the players of the National football team were allowed to access the stadium at all times, during athletics or cycling events for free, but when the SAB and the SWU asked for free tickets to the SVB hosted events, they were denied. When the athletics and cycling unions asked for permission to have free access to a game together, De La Fuente was tickled and allowed it in exchange for all his footballers to be allowed to attend a cycling event.

On Thursday, 27 August 1953 the SAB and SWU had received letters from the SVB that it was not possible for their athletes to attend the number of desired matches as requested. That day the athletics and cycling governing bodies held a meeting. Together they wrote a response demanded not only the stadium access, but addressed three additional points, namely that all athletes receive access to all of the inauguration games. Also that the predictive numbers for attendance projected for the events were influenced by the accommodations of the stadium, which needed to be reevaluated, the third point raised that a financial loss was being predicted for the final day of the sports week which was an all day cycling event, according to the SVB.

The invited guests from Aruba, Brazil, Guyana, Trinidad and Tobago for the opening ceremony stayed out of the conflict. Both A.R. Harding, manager of the Trinidad Cycling Union, and L.B. Allen manager of the Athletic Association of Guyana, went on record stating that they were guests of the SVB and would stay out of internal conflicts. On 28 August 1953 the SAB and the SWB were asked to set their differences aside ahead of the games for the sake of the event by the Minister of Social Affairs Mr. de Groot.

The following letter was sent to the SVB on Friday afternoon of August 28.

“Geacht Bestuur, Hierbij delen wij U mede dat wij op verzoek van landsregering van Suriname bij monde van de landsminister van Sociale Zaken in het nationaal belang van Suriname zullen deelnemen aan de op maandag 31 augustus en dinsdag 1 september te houden wielren- en atletiekwedstrijden. Het resultaat van de op voorstel van de landsregering gehouden bespreking werd vastgelegd in het schrijven van de landsminister van Sociale Zaken d.d. 28 augustus 1953 en luidde: ‘Het is mij een genoegen U onze bespreking van hedenmorgen vast te leggen’, waarbij werd besloten dat van beide bonden hun eisen aan de SVB met betrekking tot vrije plaatsen voor de sportweek in het stadion zullen laten varen in landsbelang. Gaarne zeg ik U toe dat ik na afloop van de feestweek onderhandelingen met het bestuur van de SVB zal openen om tot een bevredigende regeling voor de toekomst te komen. Ik zeg U dank voor de sportieve houding door U ten deze aangenomen.”

— E. Ensberg, Minister of Social Affairs, 1953

Translation:

“-Directors considered, We hereby inform you that we will participate at the request of the Government of Suriname, through the Minister of Social Affairs in the national interest of Suriname to hold cycling- and athletics competitions on Monday, August 31 and Tuesday September 1st. The result of was recorded discussion on a proposal from the national government in writing the Minister of Social Affairs dated August 28, 1953, saying: "It is my pleasure to record our discussion this morning ', where it was decided that both unions will abandon their demands to the SVB regarding free places for the sports week at the stadium in national interest. Please I tell you that I will open the festival week after negotiations with the management of the SVB to arrive at a satisfactory arrangement for the future. I say thank you for the sporting stance by you as adopted it.

— E. Ensberg, Minister of Social Affairs, 1953

Although the ceremonial sports week was a success, the relationship between the associations remained strained seeing additional conflicts arise in 1956 and in 1977. One can draw the conclusion that the problem that was created in 1911 was resolved through the construction of the stadium, although the associations of athletics and cycling have repeatedly expressed their desire for accommodations of their own.

=== Energy crisis of 1987 ===
Due to the energy crisis in Paramaribo of 1987, the Surinaamse Voetbal Bond decided to cancel all sporting events which were scheduled after night fall, beginning in May of that year. Any event that was rescheduled was moved to either a Saturday or Sunday afternoon.

Although there were no conflicts between the governing bodies during this period, the majority of the Suriname Athletics Federation agenda was rescheduled that year.

=== André Kamperveen Stadion ===
On 29 August 1988 the Suriname Stadium was officially renamed to the André Kamperveen Stadium, in honor of André Kamperveen, one of the country's most renown athletes, sports directors, journalist and philanthropist, who was brutally murdered in the December murders. Kamperveen had been the manager of S.V. Transvaal at the Suriname Stadium from 1958 to 1964, and he was the first president of the Caribbean Football Union. The name change also served to commemorate the stadiums 35th Anniversary.

Situated outside of the stadium is a bronze statue of André Kamperveen which was erected on 1 October 2000 to commemorate the Surinamese Football Association's 80th Anniversary.

== Events ==
=== 1979 CFU Championship ===
The stadium was the host venue of the 1979 CFU Championship final tournament, and held the following matches:

Date	Team No. 1	Res.	Team No. 2	Round
1979-11-11	Haiti	1–0	Trinidad and Tobago	Final tournament
1979-11-12	Suriname	2–3	Saint Vincent and the Grenadines	Final tournament
1979-11-14	Haiti	2–1	Saint Vincent and the Grenadines	Final tournament
1979-11-15	Suriname	3–0	Trinidad and Tobago	Final tournament
1979-11-17	Saint Vincent and the Grenadines	2–1	Trinidad and Tobago	Final tournament
1979-11-18	Haiti	1–0	Suriname	Final tournament

=== International football friendlies ===
Date	Team No. 1	Res.	Team No. 2	Type
1953-08-29	(Netherlands) Suriname	3–3	(Netherlands) Aruba	International friendly
1953-09-01	(Netherlands) Suriname	5–4	(Brazil) Paysandu	International/Club friendly match
1953-09-01	(Netherlands) Suriname	3–3	(Netherlands) Aruba	International friendly
1954-08-01	(Netherlands) Suriname	3–4	Netherlands	International friendly
1955-12-19	(Netherlands) Suriname	5–2	Trinidad and Tobago	International friendly
1955-12-21	(Netherlands) Suriname	3–1	Trinidad and Tobago	International friendly
1955-12-23	(Netherlands) Suriname	3–0	Trinidad and Tobago	International friendly
1957-02-07	(Netherlands) Suriname	3–1	(Austria) Rapid Wien	International/Club friendly match
1957-02-08	(Netherlands) Suriname	3–3	(Austria) Rapid Wien	International/Club friendly match
1958-07-30	(Netherlands) Suriname	2–9	Netherlands	International friendly
1959-01-03	Suriname	1–6	(Sweden) Malmö FF	International/Club friendly match
1959-09-20	Suriname	1–0	Martinique	International friendly
1961-04-02	Suriname	1–2	(Brazil) Sport Recife	International/Club friendly match
1961-04-05	Suriname	1–3	(Brazil) Sport Recife	International/Club friendly match
1961-04-07	(Suriname (Kingdom of the Netherlands)) Transvaal	0–6	(Brazil) Sport Recife	Club friendly match
1963-04-04	Suriname	4–3	Trinidad and Tobago	International friendly
1965-01-20	Suriname	3–4	(Brazil) Bangu	International/Club friendly match
1965-01-24	Suriname	1–1	(Brazil) Bangu	International/Club friendly match
1966-01-23	(Suriname (Kingdom of the Netherlands)) Transvaal	1–1	(Brazil) Náutico	Club friendly match
1967-02-11	Suriname	4–1	(Brazil) Tuna Luso	International/Club friendly match
1967-02-14	(Suriname (Kingdom of the Netherlands)) Transvaal	1–3	(Brazil) Tuna Luso	Club friendly match
1967-02-16	(Suriname (Kingdom of the Netherlands)) Robinhood	0–2	(Brazil) Tuna Luso	Club friendly match
1967-04-25	(Suriname (Kingdom of the Netherlands)) Robinhood	3–3	(Brazil) Paysandu	Club friendly match
1969-01-26	(Suriname (Kingdom of the Netherlands)) Robinhood	1–3	(Brazil) Flamengo	Club friendly match
1969-01-28	(Suriname (Kingdom of the Netherlands)) Transvaal	3–2	(Brazil) Flamengo	Club friendly match
1969-06-13	Suriname	2–1	Denmark	International friendly
1971-01-28	(Suriname (Kingdom of the Netherlands)) Transvaal	1–4	(Brazil) Santos	Club friendly match^{1}
1977-01-30	(Suriname) Transvaal	1–0	(Brazil) Paysandu	Club friendly match
1977-02-01	(Suriname) Robinhood	2–1	(Brazil) Paysandu	Club friendly match
1980-05-27	(Suriname) Transvaal	0–0	(Netherlands) Feyenoord	Club friendly match
1980-05-27	(Suriname) Robinhood	0–5	(Netherlands) Feyenoord	Club friendly match
1982-01-10	(Suriname) Transvaal	0–3	(Netherlands) Ajax	Club friendly match
1984-05-04	(Suriname) Robinhood	3–4	(Brazil) Paysandu	Club friendly match
1984-06-14	Suriname	6–2	India	International friendly
1984-06-16	Suriname	4–1	India	International friendly
1990-04-28	Suriname	5–0	Guyana	International friendly
1992-06-16	Suriname	1–1	Antigua and Barbuda	International friendly
1999-02-22	Suriname	2–1	Guyana	International friendly
2000-09-29	(Suriname) Robinhood	2–1	(Netherlands) RBC	Club friendly match
2004-01-10	Suriname	1–1	Netherlands Antilles	International friendly
2009-10-26	Suriname	0–1	Guyana	International friendly
2009-10-31	Suriname	1–1	Netherlands Antilles	International friendly
2011-01-05	(Suriname) Inter Moengotapoe	1–1	(Brazil) Paysandu	Club friendly match
2011-09-24	Suriname	2–0	Curaçao	International friendly
2011-09-25	Suriname	2–2	Curaçao	International friendly
2012-10-09	Suriname	2–1	(Suriname) Takdier Boys	International/Club friendly match
2014-12-26	Suriname	1–1	(Trinidad and Tobago) W Connection	International/Club friendly match
2015-01-31	Suriname	1–0	Guyana	International friendly
2015-06-25	(Suriname) Transvaal	3–2	(Netherlands) TAC '90	Club friendly match

1. The 1000th career match played by Pelé on 28 January 1971 at the National Stadion with Santos vs. Transvaal.

=== De Surinaamse Klassieker ===
The André Kamperveen Stadion is the host stadium of 'de Surinaamse Klassieker' the main football rivalry of Suriname. It is between Transvaal and Robinhood and is highly contested. Both teams hail from Paramaribo and play their home games at the André Kamperveen Stadion.

The first meeting between the two clubs was on 6 August 1950 when Transvaal won 3–2 against Robinhood. Having been newly promoted to the top flight, Robinhood finished as runner-up to Transvaal that year.

==== First encounter ====
6 August 1950	Transvaal	3–2	Robinhood	Cultuurtuinlaan, Paramaribo
		Report

Robinhood finished as runner-up to Transvaal in three consecutive seasons on the Owru Cul before the stadium was completed after which both teams became tenants. Robinhood then championed the first season after completion of the National Stadium.

A total 55 national titles have been won between both clubs, with Transvaal holding 19 and Robinhood 23 titles. The match has won the 'Match of the Year' award issued annually by the Suriname Olympic Committee (SOC) on several occasions as well.

In 2014, Robinhood relocated to the Dr. Ir. Franklin Essed Stadion, following the teams' first ever relegation to the Eerste Klasse, thus ending a 51-year tenure at the André Kamperveen Stadium. While both teams now occupy separate stadiums, the rivalry between the two parties remains the most intense match up in the country.

== Concerts ==
The André Kamperveen Stadium has been a host venue for concerts and performances in the country, with a maximum capacity of 40,000

Date	Band	Tour Name	Attendance
11 January 2010	Beenie Man and Morgan Heritage	Digicel 2nd Anniversary Concert	40,000
1 December 2012	Tarrus Riley and Chris Martin	Digicel 5th Anniversary Concert	40,000
6 April 2013	Rick Ross	Romeo Bravo presents Rick Ross Live In Concert	38,000
26 September 2013	Dwayne Heath		-
5 April 2014	Tarrus Riley and Konshens	Free concert to celebrate Digicel 4G launch	-
20 December 2014	Richie Spice and Beenie Man	Digicel's Better Together 7th Anniversary concert 2014	-
28 December 2014	Kassav'		-
21 March 2020	Burna Boy		

== Future plans ==
=== Owru Cul project ===
In 2014 it was announced that the Surinamese Football Association and FIFA were investing in a new sports complex on the location of the Owru Cul playing grounds across the street from the André Kamperveen Stadion. The goal is to improve the training facilities for the tenants of the stadium and to help improve the overall quality of football accommodations in Suriname. Owru Cul is the nickname of the former sports terrain on the Cultuurtuinlaan before the construction of the stadium. 'Owru' means old in the Sranan Tongo language, and Cul is an abbreviation for the Cultuurtuinlaan.

=== Expansion of the Stadium ===
In 2015, the Surinamese Football Association reported that they were going to renovate the Stadium with a budget of $22–25,000,000, which would expand the capacity to more than 10,000 seats.
