= List of Surinamese records in athletics =

The following are the national records in athletics in Suriname maintained by its national athletics federation: Surinaamse Atletiek Bond (SAB).

== Outdoor ==
Key to tables: Awaiting ratification Record not kept by SAB Not ratified or later rescinded by SAB

=== Men ===
Event	Record	Athlete	Date	Meet	Place	Ref.
100 m	10.13 (+1.6 m/s)	Jurgen Themen	28 May 2016	NCAA Division II Championships	Bradenton, United States	
100 m	10.10 (+1.0 m/s)	Issamade Asinga	31 March 2023	Florida Relay	Gainesville, United States	
100 m	9.89 (+0.8 m/s)	Issamade Asinga	28 July 2023	South American Championships	São Paulo, Brazil	
200 m	19.97 (+1.3 m/s)	Issamade Asinga	29 April 2023	Corky/Crofoot Shootout	Lubbock, United States	
400 m	46.89	Tommy Asinga	4 August 1991	Pan American Games	Havana, Cuba	
800 m	1:46.74	Tommy Asinga	8 May 1992		Indianapolis, United States	
1500 m	3:55.69	Tommy Asinga	12 May 1991		Ann Arbor, United States	
3000 m	9:14.89	Rochini Vorswijk	24 April 2011	CARIFTA Games	Montego Bay, Jamaica	
5000 m	14:50.22	Johnny Morgenthaler	10 July 2010	KBC Night of Athletics	Heusden, Netherlands	
10,000 m	33:24.9	Marcus Aminta	1 July 1983		Paramaribo, Suriname	
Marathon	2:31:48 (Note: by World Athletics source; 2:31:44 by SAB source)	Janiek Pomba	10 April 2022	Rotterdam Marathon	Rotterdam, Netherlands	
110 m hurdles	15.7 h	Denis Stutgard	1 May 1989		Paramaribo, Suriname	
400 m hurdles						
3000 m steeplechase						
High jump	2.03 m	Miguel van Assen	31 March 2013		Nassau, Bahamas	
Pole vault	3.65 m (Note: record set during decathlon competition)	Gayell Engeso	23 June 2013	NAAA Sagicor General/NGC National Championships	Port of Spain, Trinidad and Tobago	
Long jump	7.67 m	Dennis Malone	7 October 1979		Georgetown, Guyana	
Long jump	7.69 m (Note: not recognised by federation, though actually before he got Dutch citizenship)	Ed Pireau	22 August 1976		The Hague, Netherlands	
Triple jump	16.96 m (+1.3 m/s)	Miguel van Assen	2 August 2018	CAC Games	Barranquilla, Colombia	
Shot put	16.95 m	Janique Pallees	20 January 2019		Paramaribo, Suriname	
Discus throw	46.02 m	Wilfredo Burgos	5 June 1976		St. George's	
Hammer throw						
Javelin throw	56.20 m	Juan Dahl	20 June 2015		Remire-Montjoly, French Guiana	
Decathlon	5984 pts	Gayell Engeso	22–23 June 2013	NAAA Sagicor General/NGC National Championships	Port of Spain, Trinidad and Tobago	
Decathlon	100m (wind) / Long jump (wind) / Shot put / High jump / 400m / 110m H (wind) / Discus / Pole vault / Javelin / 1500m; 11.72 (+1.1 m/s) / 6.45 m (+1.8 m/s) / 10.50 m / 1.81 m / 54.70 / 15.99 (−0.2 m/s) / 32.35 m / 3.65 m / 43.79 m / 4:59.22					
20 km walk (road)						
50 km walk (road)						
4 × 100 m relay	42.35	Ifrish Alberg; Risingi Resida; Romario Pansa; Jeffrey Vanan	9 April 2016		Kourou, French Guiana	
4 × 400 m relay	3:23.9 h	Suriname; E. Wijnstein; D. Grot; S. Cruden; L. Valentijn	24 May 1986		Cayenne, French Guiana	

=== Women ===
Event	Record	Athlete	Date	Meet	Place	Ref.
100 m	11.42 (±0.0 m/s)	Sunayna Wahi	9 May 2017	RMAC Outdoor Championships	Gunnison, United States	
200 m	23.47 (+0.7 m/s)	Kirsten Nieuwendam	4 May 2012	Jim Thorpe Open	State College, United States	
400 m	52.01	Letitia Vriesde	12 July 1997		Arnhem, Netherlands	
600 m	1:27.01	Letitia Vriesde	2 September 2003		Liège, France	
800 m	1:56.68	Letitia Vriesde	13 August 1995	World Championships	Gothenburg, Sweden	
1000 m	2:32.25	Letitia Vriesde	10 September 1991	ISTAF	Berlin, Germany	
1500 m	4:05.67	Letitia Vriesde	31 August 1991	World Championships	Tokyo, Japan	
Mile	4:30.45	Letitia Vriesde	8 July 1992	Athletissima	Lausanne, Switzerland	
3000 m	9:15.64	Letitia Vriesde	11 May 1991		Leiden, Netherlands	
5000 m	19:01.53	Ilsida Toemere	22 July 2011		Rio de Janeiro, Brazil	
10,000 m						
Marathon	3:57:59	Irene Tijndal	21 November 2009		Paramaribo, Suriname	
100 m hurdles	15.48	Yvette Bonapart	24 May 1992		Alphen aan den Rijn, Netherlands	
400 m hurdles						
3000 m steeplechase	11:44.33	Letitia Vriesde	26 May 2006		Utrecht, Netherlands	
High jump	1.66 m	Deborah Gallon	5 May 2015		Paramaribo, Suriname	
Pole vault						
Long jump	5.77 m	Lilian Tholen	7 October 1979		Georgetown, Guyana	
Triple jump	12.54 m (NWI)	Deborah Galon	30 March 2019		Kourou, French Guiana	
Shot put	14.38 m	Helen Weidum	5 July 1992		Mol, Belgium	
Discus throw	40.52 m	Orlanda Lynch	7 March 1976		Paramaribo, Suriname	
Hammer throw						
Javelin throw	36.94 m	Charissa Douglas	10 February 2013		Paramaribo, Suriname	
Heptathlon						
Heptathlon	100m H (wind) / High jump / Shot put / 200m (wind) / Long jump (wind) / Javelin / 800m					
20 km walk (road)						
4 × 100 m relay	48.9 h	Suriname; Damaris Alberg; Danielle Clark; S'miralda Lynch; Ramona van der Vloot	27 March 2010	Jeux inter Guyanes	Cayenne, French Guiana	
4 × 400 m relay	4:00.5 h	Suriname; Genelva Diko; Danielle Clark; Ilsida Toemere; Ramona van der Vloot	28 March 2010	Jeux inter Guyanes	Cayenne, French Guiana	

=== Junior Men ===
Event	Record	Athlete	Date	Meet	Place	Ref.
100 m						
200 m						
400 m						
800 m						
1500 m						
3000 m	9:14.89	Rochini Vorswijk	24 April 2011	CARIFTA Games	Montego Bay, Jamaica	
10,000 m						
Marathon						
110 m hurdles						
400 m hurdles						
3000 m steeplechase						
High jump	2.03 m	Miguel van Assen	31 March 2013		Nassau, Bahamas	
Pole vault	3.65 m	Gayell Engeso	23 June 2013	NAAA Sagicor General/NGC National Championships	Port of Spain, Trinidad and Tobago	
Long jump						
Triple jump	16.33 m (+2.0 m/s)	Miguel Van Assen	19 April 2014	CARIFTA Games	Fort-de-France, Martinique	
Shot put						
Discus throw						
Hammer throw						
Javelin throw	53.99 m	Quincy Sempai	23 June 2013	NAAA Sagicor General/NGC National Championships	Port of Spain, Trinidad and Tobago	
Decathlon	5984 pts	Gayell Engeso	22–23 June 2013	NAAA Sagicor General/NGC National Championships	Port of Spain, Trinidad and Tobago	
Decathlon	100m (wind) / Long jump (wind) / Shot put / High jump / 400m / 110m H (wind) / Discus / Pole vault / Javelin / 1500m; 11.72 (+1.1 m/s) / 6.45 m (+1.8 m/s) / 10.50 m / 1.81 m / 54.70 / 15.99 (−0.2 m/s) / 32.35 m / 3.65 m / 43.79 m / 4:59.22					
20 km walk (road)						
4 × 100 m relay						
4 × 400 m relay	3:23.9	Suriname; E. Wijnstein; D. Grot; S. Cruden; L. Valentijn	24 May 1986		Cayenne, French Guiana	

=== Junior Women ===
Event	Record	Athlete	Date	Meet	Place	Age	Ref.
100 m	11.42 (±0.0 m/s)	Sunayna Wahi (Note: obviously a typo because of age)	9 May 2017	RMAC Outdoor Championships	Gunnison, United States	26 years, 268 days	
200 m							
400 m							
800 m							
1500 m							
3000 m							
5000 m							
10,000 m							
Marathon							
100 m hurdles							
400 m hurdles							
3000 m steeplechase							
High jump	1.60 m	Deborah Galon	10 March 2013		Willemstad, Curaçao		
High jump	1.60 m	Deborah Galon	1 April 2013	CARIFTA Games	Nassau, Bahamas		
Pole vault							
Long jump	5.77 m	Lilian Tholen	7 October 1979		Georgetown, Guyana		
Triple jump	12.42 m (−0.5 m/s)	Deborah Galon	2013	CARIFTA Games	Nassau, Bahamas		
Shot put	14.38 m	Helen Weidum	5 July 1992		Mol, Belgium		
Discus throw	40.52 m	Orlanda Lynch (Note: obviously a typo because of age)	7 March 1976		Paramaribo, Suriname	29 years, 38 days	
Hammer throw							
Javelin throw	36.94 m	Charissa Douglas	10 February 2013		Paramaribo, Suriname		
Heptathlon							
Heptathlon	100m H (wind) / High jump / Shot put / 200m (wind) / Long jump (wind) / Javelin / 800m						
20 km walk (road)							
4 × 100 m relay	48.9 h	Suriname; Damaris Alberg; Danielle Clark; Smiralda. Lynch; Ramona van der Vloot	27 March 2010	Jeux inter Guyanes	Cayenne, French Guiana		
4 × 400 m relay	4:00.5 h	Suriname; Genelva Diko; Danielle Clark; Ilsida Toemere; Ramona van der Vloot	28 March 2010	Jeux inter Guyanes	Cayenne, French Guiana		

== Indoor ==
=== Men ===
Event	Record	Athlete	Date	Meet	Place	Ref.
55 m	6.33	Ifrish Alberg	21 January 2011	Mountaineer Indoor Open Track Meet	Blacksburg, United States	
60 m	6.57	Issamade Asinga	11 March 2023	New Balance Nationals Indoor	Boston, United States	
60 m	6.5 h	Sammy Monsels	20 March 1971		Leiden, Netherlands	
200 m	21.83	Wendell Faria	15 March 1993		Syracuse, United States	
400 m	51.67 A	Jurgen Themen	6 February 2016	Grizzly Buffalo Clash	Alamosa, United States	
800 m	1:49.14	Tommy Asinga	11 March 1994		Indianapolis, United States	
800 m	1:47.4 OT	Tommy Asinga	1 February 1992		South Bend, United States	
1500 m						
3000 m						
60 m hurdles						
High jump						
Pole vault						
Long jump	7.25 m A	Miguel van Assen	1 February 2020	South American Championships	Cochabamba, Bolivia	
Triple jump	15.13 m	Greg Lede	15 February 1992		The Hague, Netherlands	
Shot put						
Heptathlon						
Heptathlon	60m / Long jump / Shot put / High jump / 60m H / Pole vault / 1000m					
5000 m walk						
4 × 400 m relay						

=== Women ===
Event	Record	Athlete	Date	Meet	Place	Ref.
55 m	7.15	Kirsten Nieuwendam	30 January 2010	Jimmy Carnes Indoor Invitational	Gainesville, United States	
60 m	7.43	Sunayna Wahi	3 February 2017	Grizzly Buffalo Clash	Alamosa, United States	
200 m	23.67	Sunayna Wahi	11 March 2017	NCAA Division II Championships	Birmingham, United States	
300 m	38.76	Kirsten Nieuwendam	15 December 2012	Penn State Blue & White Challenge	State College, United States	
400 m	53.56	Letitia Vriesde	19 February 1995		The Hague, Netherlands	
800 m	1:59.21	Letitia Vriesde	23 February 1997	AVIVA Indoor Grand Prix	Birmingham, United Kingdom	
1000 m	2:38.30	Letitia Vriesde	25 February 1999	GE Galan	Stockholm, Sweden	
1500 m	4:14.05	Letitia Vriesde	12 February 1992		Budapest, Hungary	
3000 m	9:07.08 (Note: outdoor mark ratified as absolute record)	Letitia Vriesde	31 January 1993		The Hague, Netherlands	
60 m hurdles						
High jump						
Pole vault						
Long jump						
Triple jump						
Shot put	14.58 m (Note: outdoor mark ratified as absolute record)	Helen Weidum	15 December 1987		Leuven, Belgium	
Pentathlon						
Pentathlon	60m H / High jump / Shot put / Long jump / 800m					
3000 m walk						
4 × 400 m relay						

=== Junior Men ===
Event	Record	Athlete	Date	Meet	Place	Age	Ref.
60 m	6.5 h	Sammy Monsels	20 March 1971		Leiden, Netherlands	17 years, 230 days	
200 m	21.83	Wendell Faria	15 March 1993		Syracuse, United States		
400 m							
800 m							
1500 m							
3000 m							
60 m hurdles							
High jump							
Pole vault							
Long jump							
Triple jump	15.13 m	Greg Lede	15 February 1992		The Hague, Netherlands		
Shot put							
Heptathlon							
Heptathlon	60m / Long jump / Shot put / High jump / 60m H / Pole vault / 1000m						
5000 m walk							
4 × 400 m relay							

=== Junior Women ===
Event	Record	Athlete	Date	Meet	Place	Age	Ref.
60 m	7.43	Sunayna Wahi (Note: unclear, no junior at this time)	3 February 2017	Grizzly Buffalo Clash	Alamosa, United States	26 years, 173 days	
200 m	23.67	Sunayna Wahi (Note: unclear, no junior at this time)	11 March 2017	NCAA Division II Championships	Birmingham, United States	26 years, 209 days	
400 m							
800 m							
1500 m							
3000 m							
60 m hurdles							
High jump							
Pole vault							
Long jump							
Triple jump							
Shot put	14.58 m	Helen Weidum	15 December 1987		Leuven, Belgium		
Pentathlon							
Pentathlon	60m H / High jump / Shot put / Long jump / 800m						
3000 m walk							
4 × 400 m relay							
