= Sports Hall of Fame Suriname =

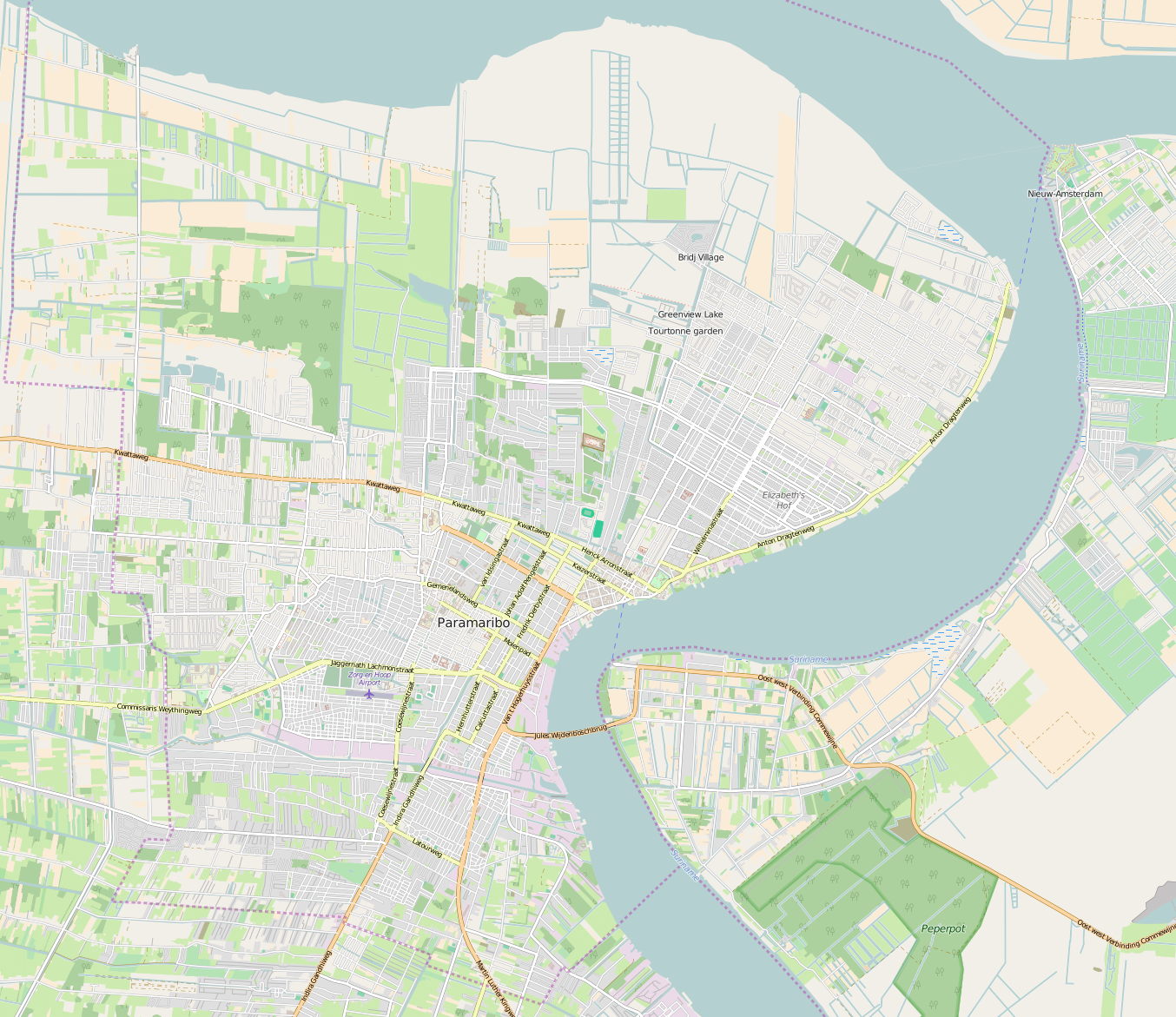
- Location within Paramaribo
- Established: 6 November 2016
- Dissolved: circa 2022
- Location: Paramaribo, Suriname
- Coordinates: 5.83825°N 55.159861°W
- Type: Hall of Fame
- Collections: sport in Suriname

The Sports Hall of Fame Suriname was until circa 2022 a museum on sports in Paramaribo, Suriname. It was located in the building of the Suriname Olympic Committee, aside the André Kamperveen Stadion.

The museum was opened on 6 November 2016 by government minister Faizal Abdoelgafoer of Sports and Youth. After the ceremony the Surinamese national anthem was sung. The sports encyclopedia of the museum could be explored in the museum as well as at the website.

In 2009, the complete photo collection of sports commentator and historian Guno Hoen was acquired. Hoen's collection was the trigger for establishing a museum dedicated to the achievements of the Surinamese sport people.

The museum showed memorabilia and documentation of athletes and role models from the history of sport in Suriname. The museum was planned to be expanded in course of time. A sporter that received broad exposure is one of the most successful Surinamese athletes, Letitia Vriesde. She was present at the opening. Another one was Anthony Nesty, a swimming champion and the first Surinamese ever to win a gold medal at Olympic Games.

== See also ==
- List of museums in Suriname
