= Montverde Academy =

Private school in Montverde, Florida, US

Location
- 17235 Seventh Street; Montverde, Florida 34756; United States; 28°35′52″N 81°40′29″W

Information
- Former names: Montverde Industrial School (1912)
- Type: Private; boarding; day; college-preparatory
- Religious affiliation: Nonsectarian
- Established: 1912; 114 years ago
- Headmaster: Jon Hopman
- Teaching staff: 106.0 (on an FTE basis)
- Grades: Pre-Kindergarten–12 & postgraduate
- Gender: Co-educational
- Enrollment: 1,234 (including 46 PK students) (2015–2016)
- Student to teacher ratio: 11.2
- Campus size: 125 acres (510,000 m^{2})
- Campus type: Rural
- Colors: Purple, Gold, & Black
- Athletics: 21 athletic teams
- Mascot: Eagle
- Nickname: Eagles
- Team name: Montverde Academy Eagles
- Accreditation: AdvancED; SACS; SAIS
- Tuition: Boarding: $57,380; Day school students: $12,888–$23,218
- Website: www.montverde.org

Montverde Academy is a private college preparatory school in Montverde, Florida, United States, located in the Greater Orlando area. The school is widely known for its athletic programs, particularly soccer and basketball.

== History ==
The school was founded in 1912 as Montverde Industrial School. The school president was Henry P. Carpenter. It underwent a major expansion in 1921 that added a concrete block dormitory for 200 boys and a new dining hall. An observation tower above the new dormitory provided a view of Lake Apopka, Winter Garden, and Groveland. The dining facilities served 400 children. In the 1920s, sports teams were established. In 1930, a girls' dormitory was constructed with funds raised by the D.A.R.

== Demographics ==
There were 1,188 K-12 students enrolled in 2015–2016 as the information is not compiled for Pre-K students. The breakdown was:

- Native American/Alaskan – 1.4%
- Asian/Pacific islanders – 4.0%
- Black – 7.7%
- Hispanic – 9.3%
- White – 44.8%
- Multiracial – 32.8%

== Athletic programs ==
Some of Montverde Academy's athletic programs compete on a national level, rather than as a member of the Florida High School Athletic Association. Sports offered include baseball, basketball, cross country, equestrian, golf, lacrosse, powerlifting, soccer, softball, swimming, tennis, track and field, and volleyball. In 2017, USA Today named Montverde Academy the best basketball program of the decade.

== Theatre and Music Conservatory ==
Montverde Academy has both music and theatre conservatories. Auditions are held on an annual basis. Conservatory students split the academic day between core courses and their chosen artistic discipline.

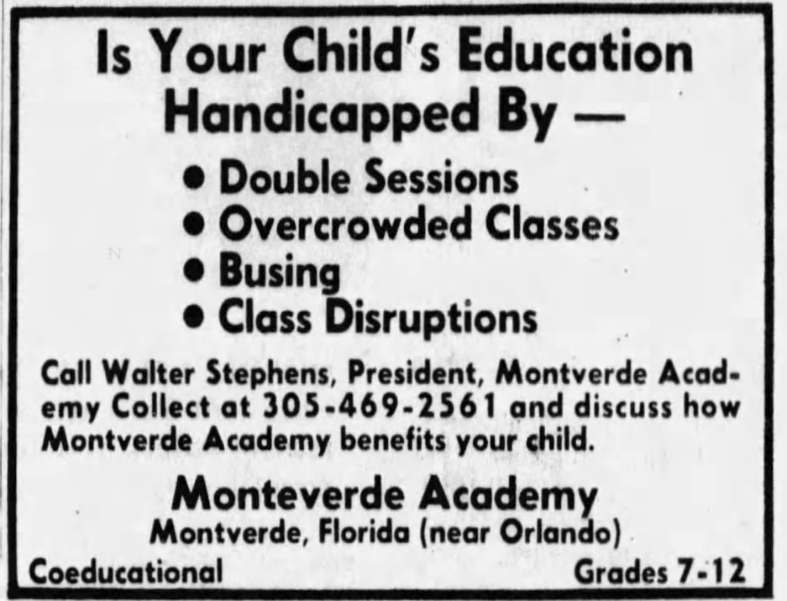
1972 advertisement for Montverde Academy

== Controversies ==
According to the United States Department of Agriculture, Kasey Kesselring, Montverde's Headmaster until his retirement in 2022, violated the Horse Protection Act, which resulted in a temporary disqualification from participating in equine events and a fine of $2,500.

In May 2017, Essence and Fox 35 Orlando reported on a 16-year-old Black female student who was dress-coded for her dreadlocks which the administrator claimed were against school policy. Following the media coverage, the then-headmaster Kasey Kesselring affirmed that the student handbook would be altered to remove the "dread lock" policy and that the rule was no longer in place.

In May 2019, several Florida news stations published a story accusing Montverde Academy Dean of Students, Jerry Matos, of having an inappropriate sexual relationship with a female upper school student. It remains unclear if she was a minor. Matos stepped down from his position immediately. The terms of his departure and current legal status are unknown. The academy promoted an existing employee to fulfill Matos's responsibilities.

On the 18th March 2025, the director of the Track and Field and Cross-Country program Gerald Phiri was provisionally suspended by the Athletics Integrity Unit following a joint investigation with USADA for the Possession of multiple prohibited substances, GW1516 and Meldonium, and for the failure to comply with the World Athletics Anti-Doping Rules. The investigation was triggered after 3 of his athletes had tested positive, between July 2023 and August 2024, for the prohibited substance GW1516, also known as Cardarine. Between them, the Surinamese athlete Issamade Asinga that in 2023 was the first high-schooler to ever go sub-10 seconds in the 100m and with 9"89 during the final of the South American Athletics Championships had set the new Under 20 World Record in the 100 meters.

== Notable alumni ==
Name	Year	Profession	Notability	Reference
Precious Achiuwa	2019	Basketball Player	Forward for the Sacramento Kings, played college basketball at Memphis	
Solomon Alabi	2007	Basketball Player	Former Toronto Raptors center, played college basketball at Florida State	
Alexander Anyaegbunam	2012	Rapper	Known by his stage name Rejjie Snow	
Issam Asinga	2023	Track & Field Athlete	Surinamese sprinter who is the fastest person under 20 years old to run the 100m dash	
Janiah Barker	2022	basketball player		
Scottie Barnes	2020	Basketball Player	Forward for the Toronto Raptors, played college basketball at Florida State	
RJ Barrett	2018	Basketball Player	Guard for the Toronto Raptors, played college basketball at Duke	
James Bell	2010	Basketball Player	Forward who played professionally in Japan, played college basketball at Villanova	
Justin Bibbs	2014	Basketball Player	Guard who played professionally in New Zealand, Poland, and the NBA G League	
Leaky Black	2018 (Transferred)	Basketball Player	Forward for the Charlotte Hornets, played college basketball at North Carolina	
Sabrina Botrán	2019	Soccer Player	Goalkeeper who plays for Comunicaciones F.C. and competes nationally for Guatemala	
Jody Brown	2020	Soccer Player	Forward for the Florida State Seminoles and competes nationally for Jamaica	
Marcus Capers	2008	Basketball Player	Guard who played professionally in Canada, Finland, Japan, and England, played college basketball at Washington State	
Jordan Caroline	2014	Basketball Player	Forward who plays professionally in Spain, played college basketball at Southern Illinois and Nevada	
Marcus Carr	2017	Basketball Player	Guard in the Israel Basketball Premier League, played college basketball for Texas	
Omar Ciss	2020	Soccer Player	Midfielder for the Charlotte Independence	
Jermaine Couisnard	2018	Basketball Player	Guard for the Oregon Ducks	
Cade Cunningham	2020	Basketball Player	Guard for the Detroit Pistons, played college basketball at Oklahoma State	
Silvio De Sousa	2017 (Transferred)	Basketball Player	Center who plays for Aris B.C., played college basketball at Kansas and Chattanooga	
Michael Devoe	2018	Basketball Player	Guard who most recently played for the Ontario Clippers, played college basketball at Georgia Tech	
Noah Dickerson	2015	Basketball Player	Forward for Starwings Basel, played college basketball at Washington	
Albert Dikwa	2017	Soccer Player	Forward for Pittsburgh Riverhounds SC	
Abdoulaye Diop	2018	Soccer Player	Midfielder for Detroit City FC	
Ates Diouf	2019	Soccer Player	Winger for Lexington SC	
Grayson Dupont	2016	Soccer Player	Midfielder for Birmingham Legion FC, played college soccer at New Mexico and UAB	
Jalen Duren	2021	Basketball Player	Center for the Detroit Pistons, played college basketball at Memphis	
Joel Embiid	2013 (Transferred)	Basketball Player	Center for the Philadelphia 76ers, played college basketball at Kansas	
Monday Etim	2017	Soccer Player	Forward for FC Helsingør	
Kwame Evans Jr.	2023	Basketball Player	Forward for the Oregon Ducks	
Mamadou Fall	2021	Soccer Player	Centre-Back for FC Barcelona Atlètic on a loan	
Bruno Fernando	2017 (transferred)	Basketball Player	Center for the Atlanta Hawks, played college basketball at Maryland	
Cooper Flagg	2024	Basketball Player	Forward for the Dallas Mavericks, played college basketball at Duke	
Michael Frazier II	2012	Basketball Player	Former Houston Rockets guard, played college basketball at Florida	
Akeyla Furbert	2012	Soccer Player	Midfielder who played college soccer at USC Aiken, competes nationally for Bermuda	
Patricio Garino	2012	Basketball Player	Former Orlando Magic forward, played college basketball at George Washington	
Emmanuel Hagan	2020	Soccer Player	College soccer player for the UNC Greensboro Spartans	
Kasey Hill	2013	Basketball Player	Professional basketball player who played professionally in Hungary, Cyprus, Poland, and Germany	
DaRon Holmes	2021 (Transferred)	Basketball Player	Forward for the Dayton Flyers	
Jalen Hood-Schifino	2022	Basketball Player	Guard for the Utah Jazz, played college basketball at Indiana	
Caleb Houstan	2021	Basketball Player	Forward for the Orlando Magic, played college basketball at Michigan	
Idong Ibok	2004	Basketball Player	Center who played in Slovenia, Sweden, and the NBA G League, played college basketball at Michigan State	
C. J. Jackson	2015	Basketball Player	Guard for Jämtland Basket, played college basketball at Eastern Florida State and Ohio State	
Justin Jackson	2010 (Transferred)	Basketball Player	Center for CS Dinamo București, played college basketball at Cincinnati	
Dakari Johnson	2013	Basketball Player	Former Center for the Oklahoma City Thunder, played college basketball at Kentucky	
Sydney Johnson-Scharpf	2018	Gymnast	Professional gymnast, competed collegiately for Florida	
Jay Tee Kamara	2021	Soccer Player	Midfielder for Portland Hearts of Pine	
Balša Koprivica	2019	Basketball Player	Center for KK Partizan, played college basketball at Florida State	
Christ Koumadje	2015	Basketball Player	Center for Alba Berlin, played college basketball at Florida State	
Bruno Lapa	2016	Soccer Player	Midfielder for Memphis 901 FC, played college soccer for Wake Forest	
Francisco Lindor	2011	Baseball Player	Shortstop for the New York Mets, 4x MLB All-Star	
Langston Love	2021	Basketball Player	Guard for the Baylor Bears	
Justin Malou	2017	Soccer Player	Defender for FC Tulsa, played college soccer at Clemson	
Sandro Mamukelashvili	2017	Basketball Player	Center for the Toronto Raptors, played college basketball at Seton Hall	
Pierre Mané	2017	Soccer Player	Midfielder for Lexington SC, played college soccer at Pittsburgh and VCU	
Philip Mayaka	2019	Soccer Player	Midfielder for Crown Legacy FC, played college soccer Clemson	
Liam McNeeley	2024	Basketball Player	Forward for the Charlotte Hornets, played college basketball at UConn	
Benji Michel	2016	Soccer Player	Winger for F.C. Arouca, played college soccer at Portland	
Dillon Mitchell	2022	Basketball Player	Forward for the St. John's Red Storm	
E. J. Montgomery	2018 (Transferred)	Basketball Player	Forward for Aomori Wat's, played college basketball at Kentucky	
Moses Moody	2020	Basketball Player	Guard for the Golden State Warriors, played college basketball at Arkansas	
Doral Moore	2015	Basketball Player	Center who played professionally in England, Puerto Rico, Taiwan, Mexico, and the NBA G League	
Faris Moumbagna	2018	Soccer Player	Forward for FK Bodø/Glimt	
Luc Mbah a Moute	2005	Basketball Player	Forward who played 12 years in the NBA, played college basketball at UCLA	
Franck Ndongo	2006	Basketball Player	Former forward for the Cameroon national team, and played college basketball at Augusta State	
Andrew Nembhard	2018	Basketball Player	Guard for the Indiana Pacers, played college basketball at Florida and Gonzaga	
Ryan Nembhard	2021	Basketball Player	Guard for the Dallas Mavericks	
Asa Newell	2024	Basketball Player	Forward for the Atlanta Hawks	
Michee Ngalina	2018	Soccer Player	Forward for Göztepe S.K.	
Landry Nnoko	2012	Basketball Player	Center for BCM Gravelines-Dunkerque, played college basketball at Clemson	
Kouat Noi	2017	Basketball Player	Forward for the Sydney Kings, played college basketball at TCU	
Haukur Pálsson	2010	Basketball Player	Forward for Alftanes, played college basketball at Maryland	
Ruslan Pateev	2009	Basketball Player	Center who played professionally in Russia and Poland, played college basketball at Arizona State	
Anthony Perez	2012	Basketball Player	Forward who plays professionally in Venezuela, played college basketball at Ole Miss	
Filip Petrušev	2018	Basketball Player	Forward for the Sacramento Kings, played college basketball at Gonzaga	
Micah Potter	2016	Basketball Player	Forward for the Portland Trail Blazers, played college basketball at Ohio State and Wisconsin	
Justin Powell	2020 (transferred)	Basketball Player	Guard for the Cleveland Charge, played college basketball at Auburn, Tennessee, and Washington State	
Derik Queen	2024	Basketball Player	Center for the New Orleans Pelicans, played college basketball at Maryland	
Matija Radović	2017	Basketball Player	Guard for KK Slodes, played college basketball at Hofstra and American International	
Malik Reneau	2022	Basketball Player	Forward for the Indiana Hoosiers	
Wilfredo Rivera	2020	Soccer Player	Forward for Orlando City SC, competes nationally for Puerto Rico	
Sherrexcia Rolle	2006	Airlines Executive	President, CEO & Accountable Manager of Western Air	
D'Angelo Russell	2014	Basketball Player	Guard for the Brooklyn Nets, played college basketball at Ohio State	
Moussa Sane	2017	Soccer Player	Forward for AS Douanes	
Day'Ron Sharpe	2020	Basketball Player	Center for the Brooklyn Nets, played college basketball at North Carolina	
Andre Shinyashiki	2015	Soccer Player	Forward for Neftçi PFK, played college soccer at Denver	
Simisola Shittu	2018 (Transferred)	Basketball Player	Forward for Limoges CSP, played college basketball at Vanderbilt	
Matheus Silva	2015	Soccer Player	Defender who played professionally in the MLS and in Brazil	
Ben Simmons	2015	Basketball Player	Guard for the Los Angeles Clippers, played college basketball at LSU	
Sean Stewart	2023	Basketball Player	Forward for the Duke Blue Devils	
Ousmane Sylla	2020	Soccer Player	Midfielder who plays for Houston Dynamo FC. Winner of the 2023 MAC Hermann Trophy. Member of the Clemson Tigers men's soccer 2023 national championship team	
MaCio Teague	2016	Basketball Player	Guard for Czarni Słupsk, played college basketball at UNC Asheville and Baylor	
Mohamed Traore	2020	Soccer Player	Defender for Los Angeles FC	
Arminas Urbutis	2005	Basketball Player	Forward who plays professionally in Spain, played college basketball at Hofstra	
Chase Vosvick	2017	Soccer Player	Goalkeeper for Pittsburgh Riverhounds SC, played college soccer at Loyola	
Marco Warren	2011	Soccer Player	Midfielder who played for the PHC Zebras and competed nationally for Bermuda, played college soccer at Flagler	
Howard Washington	2017	Basketball Player	Guard for the Buffalo eXtreme, played college basketball at Syracuse	
Dariq Whitehead	2022	Basketball Player	Forward for the Brooklyn Nets, played college basketball at Duke	
Devin Williams	2013	Basketball Player	Forward for the Taiwan Beer Leopards, played college basketball at West Virginia	
L. D. Williams	2006	Basketball Player/Coach	Coach for the Long Island Nets, played professionally in the Philippines, France, Finland, Slovenia, and for the NBA G League	
Jules Youmeni	2017	Soccer Player	Defender who played most recently for CD Calahorra B	
Pavel Zakharov	2019	Basketball Player	Center for PBC CSKA Moscow, played college basketball at Gonzaga and California Baptist	
Zhang Zhenlin	2018	Basketball Player	Forward for the Liaoning Flying Leopards, played college basketball at Tulane	
