= Seb Hines =

English footballer and coach (born 1988)

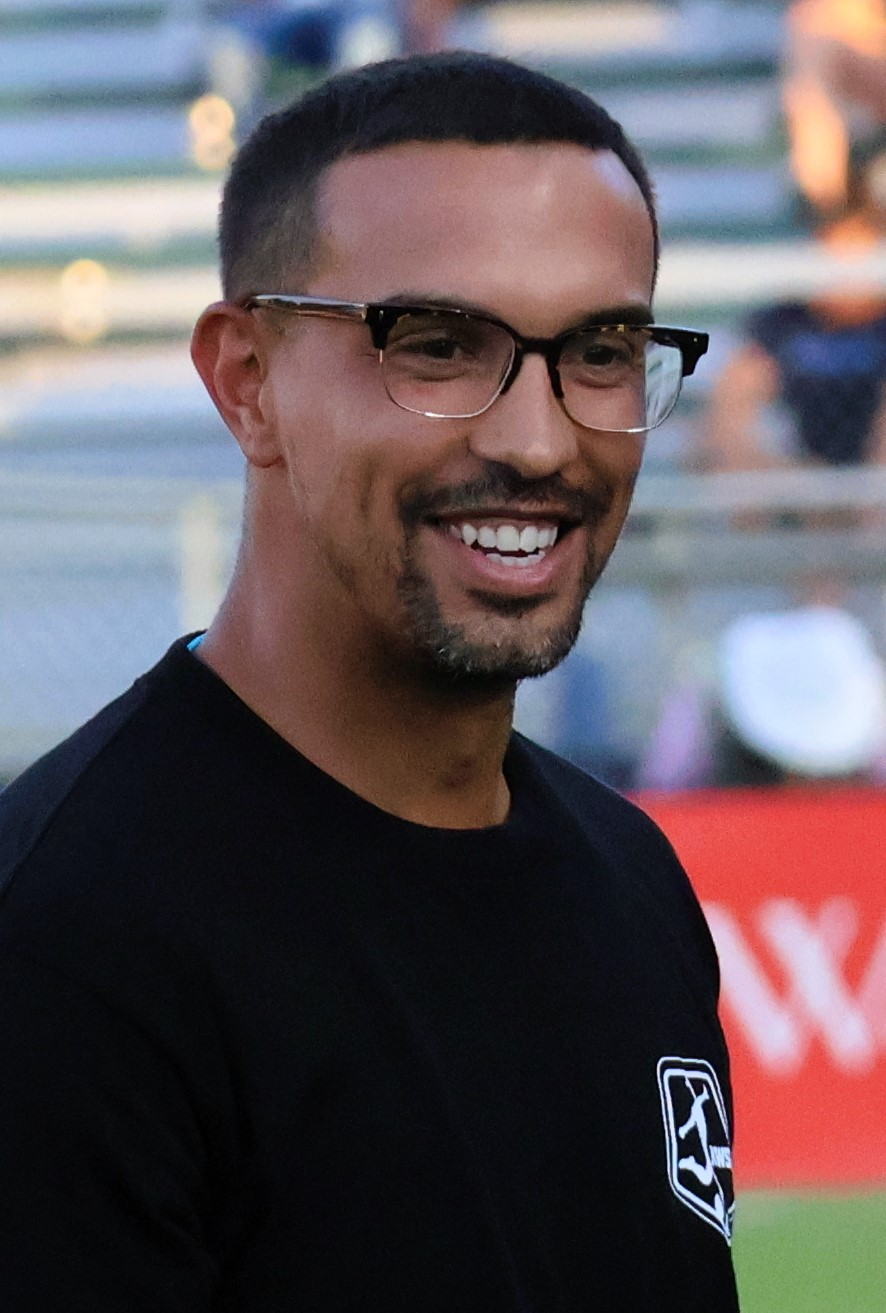
- Hines coaching the Orlando Pride in 2024

Personal information
- Full name: Sebastian Tony Hines
- Date of birth: 29 May 1988 (age 38)
- Place of birth: Wetherby, England
- Height: 6 ft 2 in (1.88 m)
- Positions: Centre back; defensive midfielder

Team information
- Current team: Houston Dash (head coach)

Youth career
- –2005: Middlesbrough

Senior career*
Years	Team	Apps	(Gls)
2005–2015	Middlesbrough	69	(3)
2009	→ Derby County (loan)	0	(0)
2009	→ Oldham Athletic (loan)	4	(0)
2014	→ Coventry City (loan)	9	(0)
2015	→ Orlando City (loan)	23	(1)
2015–2017	Orlando City	32	(4)
2017	→ Orlando City B (loan)	15	(1)
Total		152	(9)

International career^{‡}
2003	England U16	2	(0)
2004–2005	England U17	11	(0)
2006–2007	England U19	4	(0)

Managerial career
- 2022–2026: Orlando Pride
- 2026–: Houston Dash
- * Club domestic league appearances and goals as of 25 October 2017 ‡ National team caps and goals as of 8 May 2011

Sebastian Tony Hines (born 29 May 1988) is an English professional association football coach and former player who is the head coach of the Houston Dash of the National Women's Soccer League (NWSL).

Hines spent most of his playing career with Middlesbrough F.C. and Orlando City SC. He became head coach of the Orlando Pride in 2022, being named NWSL Coach of the Year after leading the club to the NWSL Shield and NWSL Championship in 2024.

== Club career ==
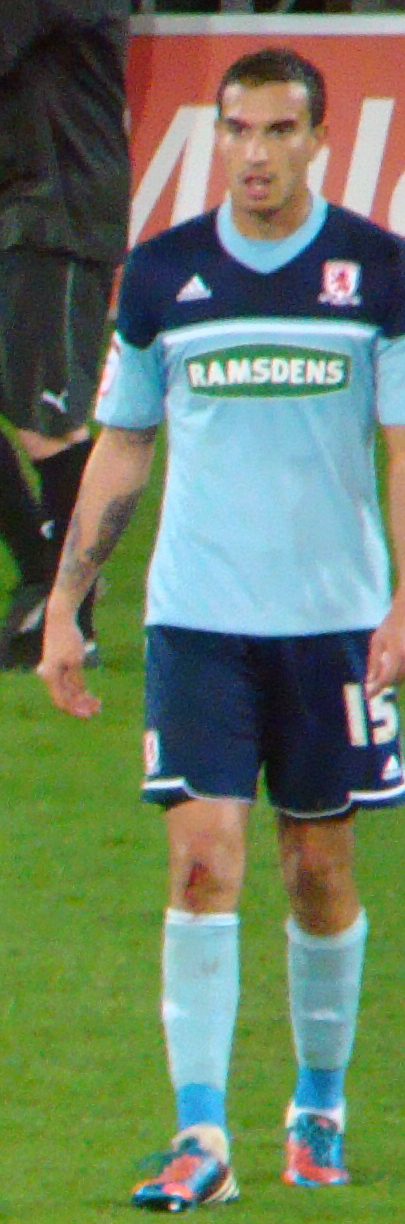
Hines playing for Middlesbrough in 2012.

=== Middlesbrough ===
Born in Wetherby, West Yorkshire, Hines played youth football at Kirk Deighton Rangers. He joined Middlesbrough after a six-week trial before progressing through the academy to full-time. However, his career was troubled with a serious knee injury in October 2005, but Hines recovered fully. Hines previously suffered an injury during the same year.

After recovering from a serious knee injury, Hines was given number thirty-eight shirt for the 2006–07 season and on 16 January 2007, he scored on his first team debut with a scorching effort from outside the box against Hull City in the FA Cup Third Round. After making another appearance against Bristol City in the fourth round of FA Cup, which saw them through in the penalty shoot-out, Hines, however, suffered an injury that kept him out for the rest of the season.

Ahead of the 2007–08 season, Hines signed his first professional contract with the club, signing a two-year deal. On 18 August 2007, he made his Premier League debut as a substitute against Fulham, which saw them win 2–1. Hines went on to make two appearances later in the season: once in the League Cup match against Northampton Town and another in the FA Cup match against Sheffield United.

Following the club's relegation to the Championship, Hines struggled to regain his first team place, but soon get a first team chance following the club's defensive crisis and made his first appearance of the season on 12 September 2009, in a 3–1 win over Ipswich Town, followed up by another appearance, in a 3–1 win over Sheffield Wednesday. After appearing two league matches, Hines never played for the club again this season, as he continued to suffer from injuries.

Having impressed from limited opportunities during the 2010 season, on 11 December 2010, Hines replaced the suspended David Wheater alongside Matthew Bates in the starting line up of Middlesbrough's defence for the club's 1–0 victory over Cardiff, where he was rewarded with the Man of the Match award. Seb continued to impress with assured performances at the heart of the Middlesbrough's defence with a cool display in the draw at Preston North End and another commanding showing in the 2–0 victory over Scunthorpe United on 1 February 2011 in which the highlight was a fine measured lob by prolific goalscorer Kris Boyd which brought about his 200th career goal. For his performance, Hines signed a contract with the club, keeping him until 2013. The following month on 8 March 2011, Hines scored his first league goal for the club, in a 2–1 win over Derby County and afterwards, Hines was given a handful of first team appearances until he was involved in a collision with Connor Wickham, in a 3–3 draw against Ipswich Town on 12 April 2011, resulting him a broken jaw and after a successful operation on his jaw, Hines, however, was out for the rest of the season. Hines finished the 2011–12 season, making sixteen appearances and scoring once in all competitions.

In the 2011–12 season, Hines appeared in four matches in all competitions at the start of the season and scored his first goal of the season in the second round of League Cup, in a 2–0 win over Peterborough United. However, Hines was soon sidelined when he suffered a knee injury that kept him out for five weeks. On 18 October 2011, Hines made his return from the first team, in a 2–0 loss against Nottingham Forest. Hines then scored his first goal for the club on 5 March 2012, in a 2–0 win over Barnsley. For the rest of the season, Hines appeared in the first team, where he kept his place and went on to make twenty-seven appearances and scoring two times in all competitions.

Ahead of the 2012–13 season, Hines signed a contract with the club, keeping him until 2015. Hines scored his appearance of the season, in the Boro's win over Crystal Palace on 25 August 2012, after Grant Leadbitter's corner skimmed Ishmael Miller's head, hit Hines on the rear and deflected in. However, in the League Cup against Swansea City, Hines scored an own goal – the only goal of the match – in the 81st minute to make the score 1–0, which knocked them out of the competition. As the 2012–13 season progressed towards the end, Hines continued to appear in the first team despite suffering from injuries. Hines went on to make twenty-seven appearances and scoring once in all competitions.

In the 2013–14 season, Hines struggled to regain his first team place under the management of Aitor Karanka. As a result, Hines was placed on the loan list. Instead Hines spent most of the season playing in the reserves. Despite this, Hines made his first appearance on 19 October 2013, where he made his first start, in a 3–2 loss against Barnsley. Despite this, Hines made four appearances in the 2013–14 season. At the end of the 2014–15 season, Hines was released by the club, ending his decade association with Middlesbrough.

==== Loan spells ====
After making one appearance in the 2008–09 season for the club, which came against Hull City on 6 December 2008, it was announced on 5 January 2009, Hines signed on loan for one month at Derby County. Though he never played in a first team game for the club, he played and scored in a reserve match against Aston Villa. Soon after, Hines' loan spell with Derby County came to an end.

On 12 February 2009, Hines was loaned out to League One club Oldham Athletic on a month's loan. It came after when he signed a contract with Middlesbrough, keeping him until 2011. Two days later, on 14 February 2009, Hines made his Oldham Athletic debut, making his first start, in a 2–1 win over Northampton Town. After making four appearances for Oldham Athletic, Hines returned to his parent club when his one-month spell expired.

After appearing three times at the start of the season at Middlesbrough, Hines joined League One side Coventry City on loan until 4 January 2014. Hines made his Coventry City debut, coming on as a late substitute, in a 1–0 win over Gillingham. Since making his debut, Hines became a first team regular at the club throughout September and October until he suffered a hamstring injury that kept him sidelined for six weeks. Despite it appeared that he fully recovered from injury, Hines' injury further delayed his return, leading his loan spell come to an end.

=== Orlando City ===
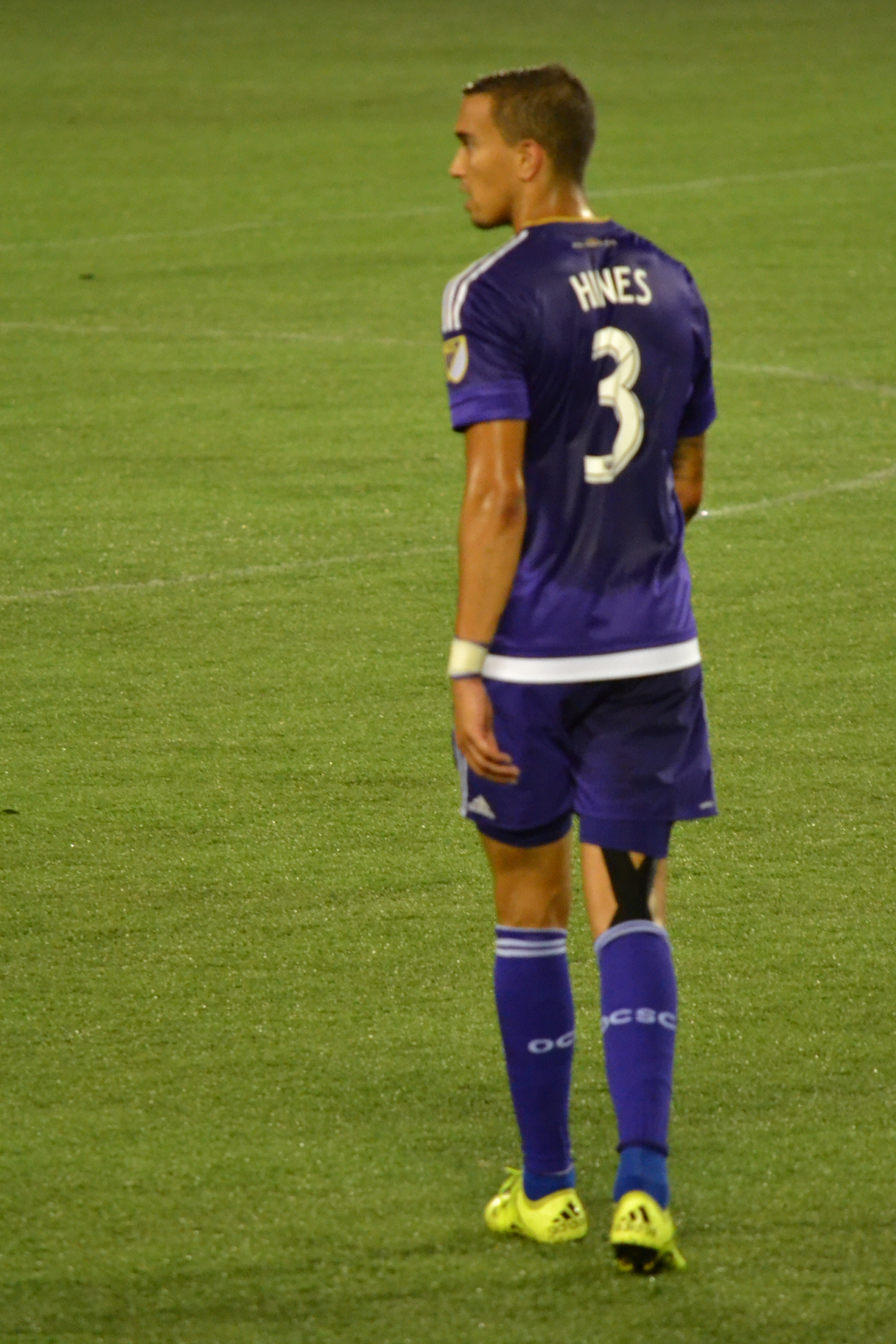
Seb Hines playing for Orlando City SC in the 2015 US Open Cup

Hines was loaned to MLS club Orlando City on 24 February 2015. Because he has an American father, Hines would not occupy one of Orlando's foreign player slots.

Hines made his Orlando City debut, where he made his first start and played the whole game, in a 1–1 draw against New York City FC at the Citrus Bowl, the first in Orlando City's competitive history. Since making his Orlando City debut, Hines began to make an impact for the club and his impressive form led Hines to hint he's keen to join the club permanently when his contract expired in the summer. When his contract at Middlesbrough, Hines' extension with the club was extended for the rest of the season. Hines continued to be in the first team until he suffered a knee injury that kept him out throughout August. On 25 September 2015, he made his first start before coming off in the 34th minute after suffering an injury, in a 5–2 win over New York Red Bulls. After being given all clear, Hines scored his first Orlando City goal on 3 October 2015, in a 2–1 win over Montreal Impact. Hines finished his first season at Orlando City, making twenty-three appearances and scoring once.

Ahead of the 2016 season, Hines scored four goals in a friendly match, with a win over Bahia on 27 February 2016. Hines then started well when he scored his first goal of the season on 3 April 2016, in a 4–1 win over Portland Timbers. After appearing absence on two occasions in two weeks between 15 May 2016 and 26 May 2016, Hines scored his second goal of the season, in a 2–2 draw against San Jose Earthquakes on 18 June 2016. Hines then captained his first Orlando City match on 9 July 2016, in a 0–0 draw against Houston Dynamo and went on to captained for the side on two occasions. Despite being once again sidelined twice, Hines finished his second season at the club, making twenty-six appearances and scoring three times.

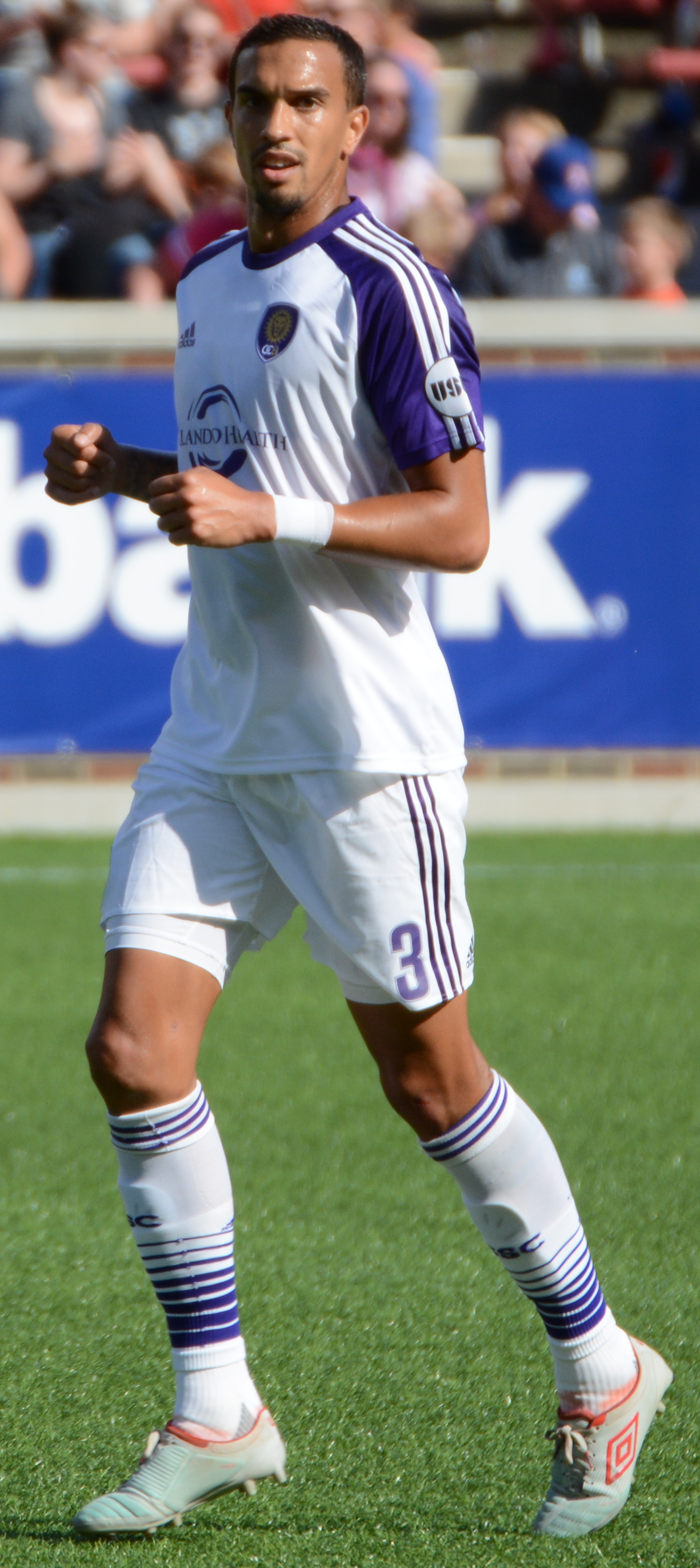
Hines playing for Orlando City B in 2017

However, at the end of the 2016 season, Orlando City declined Hines' contract option for 2017.

== International career ==
Hines has made appearances for England at U16 and U17 level. Hines is also eligible to play for the United States national team, as his father is an American citizen who served in the US military.

Hines has been called up for the England U19 squad for the first time in late-September 2006 and made his debut against Spain on 7 October 2006 in Austria to prepare for the European Under-19 Championship Tournament. Hines went on to make four appearances for England U19 side.

== Coaching career ==
=== Orlando Pride ===
After retiring at the end of the 2017 season, Hines remained with Orlando City and joined the Orlando City Youth Soccer coaching staff in March 2018.

In May 2020, Hines was named as an assistant coach of Orlando City's NWSL affiliate, Orlando Pride. Prior to the appointment, he had already been working with the Pride in training sessions and in player scouting. On 7 June 2022, Hines was promoted to Orlando Pride interim head coach when Amanda Cromwell was placed on administrative leave. The move made Hines the NWSL's first Black head coach. On 11 November 2022, Hines signed a multi-year contract to become head coach of the Pride, removing the interim tag.

On 6 October 2024, Hines became the first Black head coach in NWSL history to win a trophy after the Pride won the NWSL Shield. On 9 November, the NWSL named him the league's 2024 Coach of the Year, the first Black coach and first Orlando Pride coach to win the award. On 23 November, Hines coached the Orlando Pride to the club's first NWSL championship, completing the domestic double.

On 31 August 2026, Orlando Pride announced that they had parted ways with Hines after 5 seasons at the helm. Assistant coach Yolanda Thomas was announced as interim head coach following Hines's departure.

=== Houston Dash ===
On 17 November 2026, Hines was appointed as head coach of the NWSL's Houston Dash.

== Personal life ==
His father is American and his mother is English. He and his wife, Kirstie, have four children: two boys and two girls (including one from a previous relationship).

While on his scholarships at the club, Hines studied BTEC diplomas and certificates in Sports Science, resulting him getting BTEC Certificates of Achievement in Sports Science.

Hines attended Wetherby High School alongside fellow footballer Micah Richards.

== Career statistics ==
=== As a player ===
Stats according to Soccerbase

As of 22 October 2017

Club	Season	League			FA Cup		League Cup		Other^{[A]}		Total	
Club	Season	Division	Apps	Goals	Apps	Goals	Apps	Goals	Apps	Goals	Apps	Goals
Middlesbrough	2006–07	Premier League	0	0	2	0	0	0	0	0	2	0
Middlesbrough	2007–08	Premier League	1	0	1	0	1	0	0	0	3	0
Middlesbrough	2008–09	Premier League	1	0	0	0	0	0	0	0	1	0
Middlesbrough	2009–10	Championship	2	0	0	0	0	0	0	0	2	0
Middlesbrough	2010–11	Championship	14	1	1	0	1	0	0	0	16	1
Middlesbrough	2011–12	Championship	23	1	2	0	2	1	0	0	27	2
Middlesbrough	2012–13	Championship	21	1	2	0	4	0	0	0	27	1
Middlesbrough	2013–14	Championship	4	0	0	0	0	0	0	0	4	0
Middlesbrough	2014–15	Championship	3	0	0	0	2	0	0	0	5	0
Middlesbrough	Middlesbrough total		69	3	8	0	10	1	0	0	87	4
Derby County (loan)	2008–09	Championship	0	0	0	0	0	0	0	0	0	0
Oldham Athletic (loan)	2008–09	League One	4	0	0	0	0	0	0	0	4	0
Coventry City (loan)	2014–15	League One	9	0	0	0	0	0	0	0	9	0
Orlando City (loan)	2015	MLS	23	1	3	0	0	0	0	0	26	1
Orlando City	2016	MLS	26	3	1	0	0	0	0	0	27	3
Orlando City	2017	MLS	6	1	0	0	0	0	0	0	6	1
Orlando City	Orlando City total		55	5	4	0	0	0	0	0	59	5
Orlando City B	2017	USL	15	1	0	0	0	0	0	0	15	1
Career totals			152	9	12	0	10	1	0	0	174	10

=== As a manager ===
All competitive games (league and domestic cups) are included.

As of 3 September 2026

Managerial record by team and tenure
Team	Nation	From	To	Competition	Record							
Team	Nation	From	To	Competition	P	W	D	L	GF	GA	GD	Win %
Orlando Pride	United States	7 June 2022 (Note: Interim until 11 November 2022)	31 August 2026	Regular season	111	50	21	40	145	136	+9	45.05
Orlando Pride	United States	7 June 2022	31 August 2026	Playoffs	5	4	0	1	10	4	+6	80.00
Orlando Pride	United States	7 June 2022	31 August 2026	Cups	13	2	6	5	18	22	−4	15.38
Career totals					129	56	27	46	173	162	+11	43.41

== Honours ==
=== Manager ===
==== Orlando Pride ====
- NWSL Shield: 2024
- NWSL Championship: 2024

==== Individual ====
- NWSL Coach of the Year: 2024
