= Suriname at the 2009 World Championships in Athletics =

- WA code: SUR

in Berlin
- Competitors: 2
- Medals: Gold 0 Silver 0 Bronze 0 Total 0

World Championships in Athletics appearances
- 1987; 1991; 1993; 1995; 1997; 1999; 2001; 2003; 2005; 2007; 2009; 2011; 2013; 2015; 2017; 2019; 2022; 2023; 2025

Suriname competed at the 2009 World Championships in Athletics in Berlin, Germany, which were held from 15 to 23 August 2009. The athlete delegation consisted of two competitors, sprinters Jurgen Themen and Sunayna Wahi. Themen and Wahi competed in the men's 100 metres and women's 200 metres, respectively. Both of the athlete did not make it past the preliminary heats of either event, though, Wahi set a new personal best in the distance.

== Background ==
The 2009 World Championships in Athletics were held at the Olympiastadion in Berlin, Germany. Under the auspices of the International Amateur Athletic Federation, this was the twelfth edition of the World Championships. It was held from 15 to 23 August 2009 and had 47 different events. Among the competing teams was Suriname. For this edition of the World Championships in Athletics, sprinters Jurgen Themen and Sunayna Wahi competed for the nation.

== Results ==
=== Men ===
Themen competed in the preliminary heats of the men's 100 metres on 15 August 2009 in the fifth heat against six other sprinters. There, he recorded a time of 11.24 seconds and placed sixth, failing to advance further as only the top three of each heat and the next four fastest athletes would only be able to do so.

Event	Athletes	Heats		Quarterfinals		Semifinal		Final	
Event	Athletes	Result	Rank	Result	Rank	Result	Rank	Result	Rank
100 m	Jurgen Themen	11.24	6	did not advance					

=== Women ===
Wahi competed in the preliminary heats of the women's 200 metres on 19 August 2009 in the second heat against seven other sprinters. There, she recorded a time of 24.74 seconds for a new personal best in the distance and placed seventh, failing to advance as only the top three of each heat and the next six fastest athletes would only be able to do so.

Event	Athletes	Heats		Semifinal		Final	
Event	Athletes	Result	Rank	Result	Rank	Result	Rank
200 m	Sunayna Wahi	24.74 PB	7	did not advance			
