= Moussa Sane =

Senegalese footballer

Personal information
- Date of birth: January 18, 1997 (age 29)
- Place of birth: Dakar, Senegal
- Height: 1.75 m (5 ft 9 in)
- Positions: Winger; forward

Team information
- Current team: AS Douanes
- Number: 6

Youth career
- Galaxy United FC Academy
- SIMA

Senior career*
| Years | Team | Apps | (Gls) |
| 2017–2019 | AS Dakar Sacré-Cœur | | |
| 2017 | Orlando City | 0 | (0) |
| 2017 | → Orlando City B (loan) | 3 | (0) |
| 2020– | AS Douanes | | |

International career
- Senegal U17
- Senegal U19
- * Club domestic league appearances and goals as of June 22, 2017

Moussa Sane (born 18 January 1997) is a Senegalese professional footballer who plays as a forward.

== Career ==
Sane signed on loan with Major League Soccer side Orlando City SC on 3 March 2017. He made 3 appearances for Orlando City B.
