= Jules Youmeni =

Cameroonian footballer (born 1998)

Personal information
- Full name: Jules Gildas Youmeni Deugoue
- Date of birth: 29 June 1998 (age 28)
- Place of birth: Bafoussam, Cameroon
- Height: 1.73 m (5 ft 8 in)
- Position: Defender

Youth career
- 2013–2017: SIMA

Senior career*
| Years | Team | Apps | (Gls) |
| 2017 | Orlando City B | 6 | (0) |
| 2018–2019 | Sariñena | 16 | (0) |
| 2019–2020 | Roskilde | 0 | (0) |
| 2020 | Ringkøbing | 6 | (0) |
| 2020–2021 | Calahorra B | 19 | (0) |

International career
| 2015 | Cameroon U17 | 2 | (0) |
- * Club domestic league appearances and goals as of 20:16, 20 November 2022 (UTC)

Jules Gildas Youmeni Deugoue (born 29 June 1998) is a Cameroonian professional footballer who most recently played for CD Calahorra B in the Tercera División RFEF.

== Career ==
=== Orlando City B ===
Youmeni signed with United Soccer League side Orlando City B on 9 February 2017. He made his professional debut on 15 April 2017 against New York Red Bulls II.

=== CD Sariñena ===
On 5 November 2019, Youmeni signed with Spanish club CD Sariñena who play in Segunda División B, the third-division of Spanish soccer.

=== Roskilde ===
At the end of July 2019 it was confirmed, that Youmeni had joined Danish 1st Division club FC Roskilde. However, the deal wasn't confirmed before the 3 September 2019, where he got his work permit and could sign a two-year deal. He made his debut for the club on the same day in the Danish Cup. On 10 January 2020 it was confirmed, that he had left the club after making only the one cup appearance.

=== Ringkøbing ===
On 24 January 2020, Youmeni signed a six-month contract with Ringkøbing IF in the Danish 2nd Division. Following his move, he stated that he looked forward to develop as a player and help save the club from relegation.

=== Calahorra ===
Youmeni returned to Spain in September 2020, joining the B-team of CD Calahorra in the Tercera División.
