= Guno Hoen =

Surinamese footballer

Personal information
- Full name: Guno Hoen
- Date of birth: 26 November 1922
- Place of birth: Paramaribo, Surinam
- Date of death: 21 January 2010 (aged 87)
- Place of death: Paramaribo, Suriname
- Position: Outside forward

Senior career*
Years	Team	Apps	(Gls)
1945–1947	Cicerone		
1947	S.V. Voorwaarts		
1947–1951	Politie Voetbal Vrienden		
1951–1952	VV TGG		
1952–1960	S.V. Voorwaarts	>150	(>80)

International career
1946–1956	Suriname	>60	(~40)
- * Club domestic league appearances and goals

Guno Hoen (26 November 1922 – 21 January 2010) was a Surinamese football player, sports journalist, and sports historian. Hoen has played for S.V. Voorwaarts, Politie Voetbal Vrienden, and the Suriname national team. As a footballer, he specialised in penalties and only missed once.

After his football career, Hoen was active as sports commentator, and covered the FIFA World Cup four times. In his later life, he was a sports historian who published a three volume work about Surinamese sport people. His photo collection is on display in the Sports Hall of Fame Suriname.

== Biography ==
Hoen was born on 26 November 1922 in Paramaribo. At the age of 12, he joined the barefoot football club of sergeant Roell. During World War II, he became a soldier in the Schutterij (militia) and was stationed with the infantry in Albina. In 1942, a football match was organised against the enemy soldiers in Saint-Laurent-du-Maroni, French Guiana who were stationed on the other side of the Marowijne River. His first international match resulted in a 1–1 draw.

After World War II, Hoen started his football career at Cicerone. In 1946, he was selected to the Suriname national football team. That year, he played against French Guiana in Cayenne which resulted in a 9–0 victory during which Hoen scored two goals. In 1947, he joined S.V. Voorwaarts, but found employment as a police officer. The same year, he was transferred to Politie Voetbal Vereniging, the football team of the police, which was mandatory for serving police officers. In 1951, Hoen left the police force and started to work in Moengo where he joined VV TGG. In 1952, he returned to Paramaribo to work for the Ministry of Social Affairs, and started playing for S.V. Voorwaarts. During his tenure at S.V. Voorwaarts, Hoen played over 150 matches and scored more than 80 goals. He specialised in penalties which he could take with both left and right foot. About 80% of his goals were the result of penalties. During his career, he only missed one penalty against Stanley Mijnals, the brother of Frank and Humphrey Mijnals.

In 1954, Hoen was put on reserve during the match against the Netherlands. In 1956, he was again on reserve against Curaçao which resulted in his resignation from the national team. S.V. Voorwaarts became national champion in 1952 and 1957. In 1960, Hoen retired from active football, and became a sport commentator and writer. In 1970, 1974, 1978, and 1982, Hoen covered the FIFA World Cup for Suriname. In 1981, he published Sporthelden uit ons verleden volume I, a book about the achievements of Surinamese sport people. In 1999, the third and final volume was published. In 1988, he published Sranan odo buku, a book about proverbs in Sranan Tongo, the creole language spoken in Suriname.

In 2003, the Guno Hoen Foundation was founded to preserve his legacy and extensive photo collection. In 2009, the collection was acquired by the Ministry of Sports. His collection was the trigger for establishing the Sports Hall of Fame Suriname, a museum dedicated to the achievements of the Surinamese sport people. The museum opened in 2016.

On 21 January 2010, Hoen died in Paramaribo, at the age of 87. He was the father of 11 children.

== Honours ==
- Knight in the Honorary Order of the Palm (1997).
