= Suriname at the 2017 World Championships in Athletics =

- Flag of Suriname
- WA code: SUR
- National federation: Suriname Athletics Federation
- Website: surinaamseatletiekbond.com (in Dutch)

in London, United Kingdom 4–13 August 2017
- Competitors: 1 (1 man and 0 women) in 1 event
- Medals: Gold 0 Silver 0 Bronze 0 Total 0

World Championships in Athletics appearances
- 1987; 1991; 1993; 1995; 1997; 1999; 2001; 2003; 2005; 2007; 2009; 2011; 2013; 2015; 2017; 2019; 2022; 2023

Suriname competed at the 2017 World Championships in Athletics in London, Great Britain, from 4–13 August 2017.

== Results ==
=== Men ===
Field events

Athlete	Event	Qualification		Final	
Athlete	Event	Distance	Position	Distance	Position
Miguel van Assen	Triple jump	16.38	23	Did not advance	
