= Sunayna Wahi =

Surinamese sprinter

Personal information
- Full name: Sunayna Raiza Wahi
- Nationality: Surinamese
- Born: 14 August 1990 (age 35) Paramaribo, Suriname
- Height: 1.67 m (5 ft 6 in)
- Weight: 62 kg (137 lb)

Sport
- Country: Suriname
- Sport: Athletics
- Event: 100 metres

Sunayna Raiza Wahi (born 14 August 1990) is a Surinamese female sprinter, born in Paramaribo.

She competed at the 2016 Summer Olympics in Rio de Janeiro, in the women's 100 metres.

Wahi was a runner-up in the 200 m at the 2017 NCAA Division II women's indoor track and field championships and NCAA Division II women's outdoor track and field championships for the Adams State Grizzlies track and field team. In 2019, she became a coach for the New Haven Chargers track and field team.
