= Issam Asinga =

Surinamese sprinter (born 2004)

Personal information
- Full name: Issamade Joseph Tommy Asinga
- Born: 29 December 2004 (age 21) Atlanta, Georgia, U.S.
- Height: 1.83 m (6 ft 0 in)

Sport
- Country: Suriname, United States
- Sport: Track and field
- Event: Sprints

Achievements and titles
- Personal bests: 60 m: 6.57 NR (Boston, 2023); 100 m: 10.10 (Gainesville, 2023); 200 m: 19.97 NR (Lubbock, 2023)
Medal record
Men's athletics
Representing Suriname
South American Championships
Disqualified	2023 São Paulo	100 m
Disqualified	2023 São Paulo	200 m

Issamade Asinga (born 29 December 2004) is a dual American-Surinamese national sprinter who competes in the 100 and 200 meters.

Asinga is currently serving a four-year ban set to expire in August 2027 for an anti-doping rule violation which as of June 2025 is under appeal. His 100m personal best of 9.89 seconds was the world under-20 record and the Surinamese national record, however both are currently disqualified.

== Early years ==
Asinga was born in Atlanta, Georgia, United States in 2004. His parents are Tommy Asinga and Ngozi Mwanamwambwa who were both track and field athletes representing Suriname and Zambia respectively. Asinga mostly grew up in the United States with a four-year period between the ages of 9 and 13 living Lusaka, Zambia with his mother.

== Career ==
Asinga attended Montverde Academy where he was selected as the Gatorade Florida Boys Track & Field Player of the Year in 2023. He has signed a National Letter of Intent to compete on scholarship at Texas A&M University.

Asinga switched his international athletics country of representation from the United States to Suriname in May 2023.

== Anti-doping rule violation ==
In August 2023, Asinga was provisionally suspended by the Athletics Integrity Unit after testing positive for the banned substance GW1516. On May 27, 2024, he was officially banned for four years backdated to August 2023. All of his results since July 18, 2023 were disqualified including his World Under-20 record for the 100m that he set at the South American Championships. An appeal made to the Court of Arbitration for Sport was dismissed in October 2025.

Assinga sued Gatorade in 2024, alleging that the cardarine had entered his system via contaminated Gatorade Recovery Gummies provided to him by the company. In April 2025, a U.S. District Judge dismissed the case.

== Personal bests ==
Event	Time	Wind (m/s)	Venue	Date	Notes
100 m	10.10	+1.0	Gainesville, Florida, US	31 March 2023	
100 m	9.89	+0.8	São Paulo, Brazil	28 July 2023	Disqualified
100 m	9.83 w	+2.6	Clermont, Florida, US	23 April 2023	Wind-assisted
200 m	19.97	+1.3	Austin, Texas, US	29 April 2023	AU20R, NR
Indoor 60 m	6.57	—N/a	Boston, US	11 March 2023	
Indoor 200 m	20.48	—N/a	Boston, US	12 March 2023	

- Information from World Athletics profile.
