= Suriname Athletics Federation =

Sports governing body in Suriname

- Surinaamse Atletiek Bond
- Sport: Athletics
- Jurisdiction: Federation
- Abbreviation: SAB
- Founded: December 30, 1948
- Affiliation: IAAF
- Regional affiliation: CONSUDATLE
- President: Dennis Mac Donald
- Secretary: Bianca Mohamatsaid

Official website
- surinaamseatletiekbond.com
- (Suriname)

The Suriname Athletics Federation (Dutch: Surinaamse Atletiek Bond, SAB) is the governing body for the sport of athletics in Suriname. Current president is Dennis Mac Donald.

== History ==
Former logo

SAB was founded on December 30, 1948.

== Affiliations ==
SAB is the national member federation for Suriname in the following international organisations:

- International Association of Athletics Federations (IAAF)
- Confederación Sudamericana de Atletismo (CONSUDATLE; South American Athletics Confederation)
- Association of Panamerican Athletics (APA)
- Central American and Caribbean Athletic Confederation (CACAC)

Moreover, it is part of the following national organisations:

- Suriname Olympic Committee (Dutch: Surinaams Olympisch Comité)

== National records ==
SAB maintains the Surinamese records in athletics.
