= 2020 Greenville Triumph SC season =

Greenville Triumph SC
2020 season
- Owner: Joe Erwin; William M. Webster
- Head Coach: John Harkes
- Stadium: Legacy Early College Field
- USL League One: 1st
- USL League One Championship: Champions
- U.S. Open Cup: Second Round
- Highest home attendance: 1,513 (Oct. 18 vs. OMA)
- Lowest home attendance: 601 (Sept. 13 vs. MAD)
- Average home league attendance: 984
- Biggest win: ORL 1–4 GVL (Oct. 24)

The 2020 Greenville Triumph SC season was the second season in the soccer team's history, where they competed in the third division of American soccer, USL League One, the second season of that competition. Greenville Triumph SC also participated in the 2020 U.S. Open Cup. Greenville Triumph SC play their home games at Legacy Early College Field, located in Greenville, South Carolina, United States.

== Club ==
=== Roster ===
As of March 3, 2020.

No.	Position	Nation	Player
3	DF	USA	Tyler Polak
5	MF	ENG	Max Hemmings
6	MF	ENG	Paul Clowes
7	FW	USA	Alex Morrell
8	MF	USA	Aaron Walker
9	FW	USA	Jake Keegan
10	MF	ESP	Carlos Gómez
11	DF	USA	Evan Lee
15	DF	USA	Brandon Fricke
16	MF	USA	Colin Stripling
17	FW	ENG	JJ Donnelly
18	MF	SOM	Omar Mohamed
22	GK	GUM	Dallas Jaye
26	DF	SOM	Abdi Mohamed
30	GK	USA	Paul Christensen
—	FW	AUS	Lachlan McLean
—	DF	USA	Cesar Murillo
—	MF	USA	Noah Pilato
—	DF	USA	Trevor Swartz

=== Coaching staff ===
As of December 24, 2019

Name	Position
(United States) John Harkes	Head coach
(United States) Alex Blackburn	Assistant coach
(Bermuda) Rick Wright	Assistant coach

=== Front Office Staff ===
Name	Position
(United States) Joe Erwin	Majority owner and chairman
(United States) Chris Lewis	President
(United States) Doug Erwin	Vice chairman

== Competitions ==
=== Exhibitions ===
February 15, 2020 Preseason 1	Greenville Triumph SC	1–0	Charleston Battery	Greenville, South Carolina
2:00 PM EST	Walker 16' (pen.)	Report		Stadium: Legacy Early College Field

February 19, 2020 Preseason 2	Charleston Battery	Cancelled	Greenville Triumph SC	Charleston, South Carolina
2:00 PM EST		Report		Stadium: Patriots Point Soccer Complex

February 22, 2020 Preseason 3	Greenville Triumph SC	0–2	Charlotte Independence	Greenville, South Carolina
7:00 PM EST		Report		Stadium: Alumni Stadium

February 29, 2020 Preseason 4	Greenville Triumph SC	2–1	North Carolina FC	Cary, North Carolina
3:00 PM EST	Morrell; Pilato	Report	Albadawi	Stadium: WakeMed Soccer Park Field #3

=== USL League One ===
==== Standings ====
Pos	Team	Pld	W	L	D	GF	GA	GD	Pts	PPG	Qualification
1	Greenville Triumph SC	16	11	3	2	24	11	+13	35	2.19	Final, 2021 U.S. Open Cup
2	Union Omaha	16	8	3	5	20	15	+5	29	1.81	Final
3	North Texas SC (Note: Professional teams that are owned by teams playing in a higher division are ineligible for the U.S. Open Cup.)	16	7	3	6	27	19	+8	27	1.69	
4	Richmond Kickers	16	8	6	2	22	22	0	26	1.63	
5	Chattanooga Red Wolves SC	15	6	5	4	21	17	+4	22	1.47	

Source: 2020 USL League One standings
Rules for classification: 1) points; 2) total wins; 3) total goal differential; 4) total goals scored; 5) points earned against top four Conference finishers; 6) disciplinary points; 7) coin toss or drawing of lots

==== Results summary ====
Overall								Home						Away					
Pld	W	D	L	GF	GA	GD	Pts	W	D	L	GF	GA	GD	W	D	L	GF	GA	GD
0	0	0	0	0	0	0	0	0	0	0	0	0	0	0	0	0	0	0	0

Source: USL League One

==== Results by round ====
Round	1	2	3	4	5	6	7	8	9	10	11	12	13	14	15	16	17	18	19	20	21	22	23	24	25	26	27	28
Stadium	H	H	A	A	H	A	A	H	H	H	A	H	A	A	H	A	H	A	H	A	H	H	A	A	A	A	H	H
Result																												
Position																												

Source: USL League One
A = Away; H = Home; W = Win; D = Draw; L = Loss

==== Match Results ====
July 18, 2020 1	Fort Lauderdale CF	0–2	Greenville Triumph SC	Fort Lauderdale, Florida
7:00 PM EDT	Cardenas (yellow card) 55'	Report	Lee (yellow card) 39'; Morrell 45+4'; Keegan 47'; Walker (yellow card) 66'; Stripling (yellow card) 90+1'	Stadium: Inter Miami CF Stadium; Attendance: 0 (closed door); Referee: Natalie Simon

July 25, 2020 2	Greenville Triumph SC	3–2	Richmond Kickers	Greenville, South Carolina
7:00 PM EDT	Thomsen 21' (o.g.); Antley 46' (o.g.); Morrell (yellow card) 57'; Pilato (yellow card) 64'; Keegan 69'; Fricke (red card) 76'	Report	Bolduc 35'; Terzahgi 74'; Boateng (yellow card) 90+1'	Stadium: Legacy Early College Field; Attendance: 0 (closed door); Referee: Kevin Broadley

July 31, 2020 3	Forward Madison FC	0–0	Greenville Triumph SC	Wauwatosa, Wisconsin
7:00 PM CDT		Report	Pilato (yellow card) 90+5'	Stadium: Hart Park; Referee: Calin Radosav

August 5, 2020 4	Greenville Triumph SC	1–0	South Georgia Tormenta FC	Greenville, South Carolina
7:00 PM EDT	Donnelly 90+1'	Report	Skelton (yellow card) 32'; Gómez (yellow card) 74'; Williams (yellow card) 90+4'	Stadium: Legacy Early College Field; Referee: Izlen Peksenar

August 15, 2020 5	Greenville Triumph SC	1–0	Chattanooga Red Wolves SC	Greenville, South Carolina
7:00 PM EDT	Fricke (yellow card) 43'; Hawkins (yellow card) 45'; Morrell (yellow card) 52'; McLean 71'; Donnelly (yellow card) 76'	Report	Uzo (yellow card) 90+3'	Stadium: Legacy Early College Field; Attendance: 883; Referee: Kevin Broadley

August 22, 2020 6	Greenville Triumph SC	1–0	Fort Lauderdale CF	Greenville, South Carolina
7:00 PM EDT	Pilato 67'; Lee (yellow card) 82'; Jaye (yellow card) 90+1'; Walker (yellow card) 90+3'	Report		Stadium: Legacy Early College Field; Attendance: 993; Referee: Sergii Demianchuk

August 26, 2020 7	New England Revolution II	1–0	Greenville Triumph SC	Foxborough, Massachusetts
7:00 PM EDT	Shimazaki 57'; Quinones (yellow card) 61'; Maciel (yellow card) 87'; Mendonca (yellow card) 90+2'; Sinclair (yellow card) 90+5'	Report		Stadium: Gillette Stadium; Referee: Adam Kilpatrick

August 29, 2020 8	Richmond Kickers	2–1	Greenville Triumph SC	Richmond, Virginia
7:00 PM EDT	Terzaghi 15'; Bolduc (yellow card) 36'; Kraft 45+2'; Antley (yellow card) 64' (yellow-red card) 74'	Report	Fricke 29'; Clowes (yellow card) 46'; Walker (yellow card) 80'	Stadium: City Stadium; Attendance: 875; Referee: Matthew Franz

September 4, 2020 9	South Georgia Tormenta FC	1–2	Greenville Triumph SC	Statesboro, Georgia
7:00 PM EDT	Gómez (yellow card) 26'; Mayr-Fälten (yellow card) 73'; Williams (yellow card) 75'; Arslan 78'	Report	McLean 13'; Morrell 36'; Donnelly (yellow card) 90+4'	Stadium: Eagle Field at Erk Russell Athletic Park; Attendance: 400; Referee: Izlen Peksenar

September 13, 2020 10	Greenville Triumph SC	2–0	Forward Madison FC	Greenville, South Carolina
3:00 PM EDT	McLean 25'; Mohamed (yellow card) 35'; Lee (yellow card) 45+2'; Keegan 81'	Report	Ovalle (yellow card) 29'	Stadium: Legacy Early College Field; Attendance: 601; Referee: Joshua Escobar

September 19, 2020 11	Chattanooga Red Wolves SC	0–1	Greenville Triumph SC	East Ridge, Tennessee
1:00 PM EDT	Mangels (yellow card) 21'; Ramos (yellow card) 26'; Soto (yellow card) 51'; Hernández (yellow card) 70'	Report	Murillo (yellow card) 36'; McLean (yellow card) 45'; Pilato 84'; Stripling (yellow card) 90'	Stadium: CHI Memorial Stadium; Referee: Amin Hadzic

September 25, 2020 12	Greenville Triumph SC	1–0	North Texas SC	Greenville, South Carolina
7:00 PM EDT	Polak (yellow card) 16'; Donnelly (yellow card) 56'; Keegan 86'	Report		Stadium: Legacy Early College Field; Attendance: 903; Referee: William Steffen

October 2, 2020 13	Greenville Triumph SC	2–0	Orlando City B	Greenville, South Carolina
7:00 PM EDT	McLean 65'; Morrell 69'	Report	Rodas (yellow card) 74'	Stadium: Legacy Early College Field; Attendance: 1,010; Referee: Izlen Peksenar

October 10, 2020 14	FC Tucson	2–2	Greenville Triumph SC	Tucson, Arizona
7:00 PM EDT	Ramos-Godoy (yellow card) 12', (goal) 47'; Calvo (yellow card) 14'; Coan 45'; Virgen (yellow card) 56'; Merancio (yellow card) 71'	Report	McLean 14', 90+1'; Polak (yellow card) 73'	Stadium: Kino North Stadium; Referee: Alan Martinez-Loyola

October 18, 2020 15	Greenville Triumph SC	1–2	Union Omaha	Greenville, South Carolina
3:00 PM EDT	Pilato 36'; Walker (yellow card) 38'; Stripling (yellow card) 90+4'	Report	Molina 19'; Sousa (yellow card) 22'; Scearce (yellow card) 43'; Viader (yellow card) 60'; Conway 66'	Stadium: Legacy Early College Field; Attendance: 1,513; Referee: Izlen Peksenar

October 24, 2020 16	Orlando City B	1–4	Greenville Triumph SC	Orlando, Florida
7:00 PM EDT	Rodas (yellow card) 41'; Amer (yellow card) 64'; Gluvačević 73'; Ndje (yellow card) 90'	Report	Morrell 11', 26'; Walker (yellow card) 45+3'; McLean 58'; Powell (yellow card) 80'; Booth 90+1'	Stadium: Exploria Stadium; Referee: Gabriele Giusti

==== Playoff Final ====
October 30, 2020	Greenville Triumph SC	cancelled	Union Omaha	Greenville, South Carolina
8:00pm (EDT)				Stadium: Legacy Early College Field

Note: Game was cancelled the day before because several Union Omaha players tested positive for COVID-19. Greenville was awarded the title based on points per game average (2.188 to 1.825).

=== U.S. Open Cup ===
As a USL League One club, Greenville will enter the competition in the Second Round, to be played April 7–9. On January 29, 2020 the Second Round schedule was announced.

April 7, 2020 Second Round	Greenville Triumph SC (South Carolina)	cancelled	New Mexico United	Greenville, South Carolina
7:30 PM EDT				Stadium: Legacy Early College Field
Note: US Open Cup canceled due to the COVID-19 pandemic
