= 2020 USL League One season =

USL League One
- Season: 2020
- Dates: July 18 (Note: The regular season was slated to begin on March 27, but was delayed to April 11 due to the COVID-19 pandemic. This delay was extended to May 10. The delay was extended for a third time with the USL awaiting guidance and clarity from various authorities before announcing a new date. On June 5, a provisional start date of July 18 was announced.) – October 24
- Champions: Greenville Triumph SC (1st Title)
- Regular season title: Greenville Triumph SC (1st Title)
- Matches: 87
- Goals: 222 (2.55 per match)
- Best player: (Argentina) Emiliano Terzaghi Richmond Kickers
- Top goalscorer: (Argentina) Emiliano Terzaghi Richmond Kickers (10 Goals)
- Best goalkeeper: (Guam) Dallas Jaye Greenville Triumph SC
- Biggest home win: MAD 4–0 TRM (August 14)
- Biggest away win: MAD 0–4 NEW (September 4)
- Highest scoring: NTX 3–3 NEW (August 15)
- Longest winning run: 5 games Greenville Triumph SC (September 4 – October 2)
- Longest unbeaten run: 8 games Union Omaha (July 25 – September 11)
- Longest winless run: 13 games Orlando City B (August 14 – October 24)
- Longest losing run: 8 games Orlando City B (September 6 – October 24)

The 2020 USL League One season was the second season of USL League One. The regular season was scheduled to begin on March 27 and end on October 3. On March 13, it was announced the regular season start would be delayed to April 11 due to the COVID-19 pandemic. This delay was extended to May 10. The delay was extended for a third time with the USL awaiting guidance and clarity from various authorities before announcing a new date. On June 5, the league announced a provisional return date of July 18. On July 2, the league announced a modified 20-game schedule (but changed to a 16-game schedule on July 17) with a modified playoffs. Now, only the top two teams will go straight to the League Finals, on the weekend of October 31. On July 8, Toronto FC II announced they would not play in 2020 because of COVID-19 restrictions. They remain a member club of the league, and plan to return for the 2021 season. Nine teams return from the inaugural season, while three new teams enter for the first time; MLS reserve teams Fort Lauderdale CF and New England Revolution II, and expansion club Union Omaha.

North Texas SC was the defending champion. They were unable to defend the title after finishing third in the regular season, eliminating them from the Championship game.

The Championship game was canceled on October 29, 2020, after several Union Omaha players tested positive for COVID-19. Greenville Triumph SC was awarded the title based on points per game average (2.188 to 1.825).

== Teams ==
Locations of teams for the 2020 USL League One season
Withdrew because of COVID-19 restrictions

Club	City	Stadium	Capacity	Head coach	Affiliate	Jersey manufacturer	Jersey sponsor
Chattanooga Red Wolves SC	Chattanooga, Tennessee	CHI Memorial Stadium	5,000	Jimmy Obleda		(Germany) Adidas	Transcard
Fort Lauderdale CF	Fort Lauderdale, Florida	Inter Miami CF Stadium	19,000	Jason Kreis	Inter Miami CF	(Germany) Adidas	
Forward Madison FC	Madison, Wisconsin	Hart Park	3,000	Daryl Shore	Chicago Fire FC	(Denmark) Hummel	Dairyland Insurance
Greenville Triumph SC	Greenville, South Carolina	Legacy Early College Field	4,000	John Harkes		(United States) Nike	Scansource
New England Revolution II	Foxborough, Massachusetts	Gillette Stadium	20,000	Clint Peay	New England Revolution	(Germany) Adidas	UnitedHealthcare
North Texas SC	Arlington, Texas	Globe Life Park in Arlington	48,114	Eric Quill	FC Dallas	(Germany) Adidas	AdvoCare
Orlando City B	Kissimmee, Florida	Osceola County Stadium	5,400	Marcelo Neveleff	Orlando City SC	(Germany) Adidas	Orlando Health
Richmond Kickers	Richmond, Virginia	City Stadium	22,611	Darren Sawatzky		(Germany) Adidas	Absolute Stone Design
South Georgia Tormenta FC	Statesboro, Georgia	Eagle Field at Erk Russell Park	3,500	Ian Cameron		(Germany) Adidas	Optim Healthcare
Toronto FC II †	Toronto, Ontario	BMO Training Ground	1,000	Mike Muñoz	Toronto FC	(Germany) Adidas	BMO
FC Tucson	Tucson, Arizona	Kino Sports Complex	3,500	John Galas	Phoenix Rising FC	(Italy) Macron	Chapman Automotive
Union Omaha	Papillion, Nebraska	Werner Park	9,023	Jay Mims		(United States) Nike	CHI Health (home); Nebraska Medicine (away)

MLS affiliated
MLS/USLC owned

^{†}Withdrew for the season.

=== Managerial changes ===
Team	Outgoing manager	Manner of departure	Date of vacancy	Incoming manager	Date of appointment
Richmond Kickers	(United States) David Bulow	Contract not renewed	October 9, 2019	(United States) Darren Sawatzky	November 6, 2019
FC Tucson	(United States) Darren Sawatzky	Mutual separation	November 6, 2019	(United States) John Galas	December 24, 2019
Chattanooga Red Wolves SC	(United States) Tim Hankinson	Mutual separation	November 20, 2019	(United States) Jimmy Obleda	November 21, 2019
Orlando City B	(Costa Rica) Roberto Sibaja	End of interim period	December 20, 2019	(Argentina) Marcelo Neveleff	December 20, 2019
Toronto FC II	(United States) Michael Rabasca	Mutual separation	January 27, 2020	(United States) Mike Muñoz	January 27, 2020
South Georgia Tormenta FC	(United States) John Miglarese	Promoted to technical director	September 16, 2020	(Scotland) Ian Cameron	September 16, 2020

== League table ==
Pos	Team	Pld	W	L	D	GF	GA	GD	Pts	PPG	Qualification
1	Greenville Triumph SC	16	11	3	2	24	11	+13	35	2.19	Final, 2021 U.S. Open Cup
2	Union Omaha	16	8	3	5	20	15	+5	29	1.81	Final
3	North Texas SC (Note: Professional teams that are owned by teams playing in a higher division are ineligible for the U.S. Open Cup.)	16	7	3	6	27	19	+8	27	1.69	
4	Richmond Kickers	16	8	6	2	22	22	0	26	1.63	
5	Chattanooga Red Wolves SC	15	6	5	4	21	17	+4	22	1.47	
6	FC Tucson	16	6	6	4	21	19	+2	22	1.38	
7	Forward Madison FC	16	5	5	6	20	14	+6	21	1.31	
8	Tormenta FC	16	5	7	4	19	22	−3	19	1.19	
9	New England Revolution II	16	5	8	3	19	26	−7	18	1.13	
10	Fort Lauderdale CF	16	4	9	3	19	28	−9	15	0.94	
11	Orlando City B	15	1	11	3	10	29	−19	6	0.40	

Source: 2020 USL League One standings
Rules for classification: 1) points; 2) total wins; 3) total goal differential; 4) total goals scored; 5) points earned against top four Conference finishers; 6) disciplinary points; 7) coin toss or drawing of lots

== Results table ==
Color Key: Home • Away • Win • Loss • Draw • Cancelled
Club	Matches															
Club	1	2	3	4	5	6	7	8	9	10	11	12	13	14	15	16
Chattanooga Red Wolves (CHA)	TRM	TUC	NTX	GVL	TRM	NEW	FTL	NEW	RIC	OMA	GVL	MAD	NTX	ORL	MAD	RIC
Chattanooga Red Wolves (CHA)	2–2	1–0	2–2	0–1	1–2	4–0	1–1	2–1	2–1	2–0	0–1	0–1	1–3	CAN	1–1	2–1
Fort Lauderdale CF (FTL)	GVL	TUC	TRM	ORL	NTX	GVL	CHA	ORL	TRM	RIC	TUC	OMA	NTX	NEW	MAD	OMA
Fort Lauderdale CF (FTL)	0–2	1–2	2–1	1–1	3–2	0–1	1–1	2–0	1–2	1–2	2–1	2–3	0–3	1–4	2–2	0–1
Forward Madison FC (MAD)	NTX	GVL	RIC	TRM	OMA	ORL	NEW	GVL	TUC	CHA	TUC	OMA	FTL	CHA	NTX	NEW
Forward Madison FC (MAD)	1–2	0–0	0–1	4–0	1–1	3–1	4–0	0–2	1–2	1–0	0–0	0–0	2–2	1–1	0–1	2–1
Greenville Triumph SC (GVL)	FTL	RIC	MAD	TRM	CHA	FTL	NEW	RIC	TRM	MAD	CHA	NTX	ORL	TUC	OMA	ORL
Greenville Triumph SC (GVL)	2–0	3–2	0–0	1–0	1–0	1–0	0–1	1–2	2–1	2–0	1–0	1–0	2–0	2–2	1–2	4–1
New England Revolution II (NEW)	OMA	ORL	NTX	RIC	GVL	CHA	MAD	CHA	TUC	OMA	ORL	RIC	FTL	NTX	TRM	MAD
New England Revolution II (NEW)	0–0	0–2	3–3	1–2	1–0	0–4	0–4	1–2	0–1	2–0	1–0	4–0	4–1	1–1	0–4	1–2
North Texas SC (NTX)	MAD	OMA	CHA	NEW	FTL	OMA	ORL	TUC	TUC	GVL	FTL	CHA	RIC	NEW	MAD	TRM
North Texas SC (NTX)	2–1	0–1	2–2	3–3	2–3	2–2	1–1	2–0	1–1	0–1	3–0	3–1	2–1	1–1	1–0	2–1
Orlando City B (ORL)	TRM	NEW	FTL	TUC	MAD	TRM	NTX	OMA	FTL	NEW	GVL	RIC	CHA	TUC	RIC	GVL
Orlando City B (ORL)	0–2	2–0	1–1	1–4	1–3	1–1	1–1	0–1	0–2	0–1	0–2	1–2	CAN	0–2	1–3	1–4
Richmond Kickers (RIC)	GVL	TRM	MAD	TUC	NEW	GVL	TUC	CHA	FTL	OMA	NEW	ORL	NTX	TRM	ORL	CHA
Richmond Kickers (RIC)	2–3	0–0	1–0	2–1	2–1	2–1	2–2	1–2	2–1	1–0	0–4	2–1	1–2	0–1	3–1	1–2
Tormenta FC (TRM)	CHA	RIC	ORL	GVL	FTL	MAD	CHA	ORL	GVL	OMA	FTL	OMA	TUC	RIC	NEW	NTX
Tormenta FC (TRM)	2–2	0–0	2–0	0–1	1–2	0–4	2–1	1–1	1–2	2–2	2–1	0–3	0–1	1–0	4–0	1–2
FC Tucson (TUC)	FTL	CHA	OMA	RIC	ORL	OMA	RIC	NTX	NEW	NTX	MAD	FTL	MAD	TRM	GVL	ORL
FC Tucson (TUC)	2–1	0–1	1–2	1–2	4–1	1–2	2–2	0–2	1–0	1–1	2–1	1–2	0–0	1–0	2–2	2–0
Union Omaha (OMA)	NEW	NTX	TUC	MAD	NTX	TUC	ORL	TRM	CHA	NEW	RIC	FTL	TRM	MAD	GVL	FTL
Union Omaha (OMA)	0–0	1–0	2–1	1–1	2–2	2–1	1–0	2–2	0–2	0–2	0–1	3–2	3–0	0–0	2–1	1–0

== USL League One Championship ==
The game was canceled the day before because several Union Omaha players tested positive for COVID-19. Greenville was awarded the title based on points per game average (2.188 to 1.825).

October 30, 2020
8:00pm EDT

Greenville Triumph SC	3-0 (Cancelled)	Union Omaha

Legacy Early College Field, Greenville, South Carolina

== Attendance ==
=== Average home attendances ===
Ranked from highest to lowest average attendance.

Team	GP	Total	High	Low	Average
Union Omaha	8	20,000	2,700	2,400	2,500
Greenville Triumph SC	8	5,903	1,513	601	984
North Texas SC	8	7,119 or 7,082	1,137	652 or 615	890 or 885
Richmond Kickers	8	6,274	875	626	784
Chattanooga Red Wolves SC	8	4,065	1,000	150	681
Forward Madison FC	8	2,521	540	409	504
Tormenta FC	8	3,200	400	400	400
FC Tucson	8	0	0	0	0
New England Revolution II	8	0	0	0	0
Fort Lauderdale CF	8	0	0	0	0
Orlando City B	7	0	0	0	0
Total	87	49,082 or 49,045	2,700	150	1,002 or 1,001

|note= North Texas vs Forward madison game has two numbers USL League One says 652 while North Texas Website lists it as 615. 49 games had reported attendances.

== Statistical leaders ==
=== Top scorers ===
Rank	Player	Nation	Club	Goals
1	Emiliano Terzaghi	ARG	Richmond Kickers	10
2	Greg Hurst	SCO	Chattanooga Red Wolves SC	8
3	Ricky Lopez-Espin	USA	Fort Lauderdale CF	7
3	Lachlan McLean	AUS	Greenville Triumph SC	7
5	Evan Conway	USA	Union Omaha	6
6	Ronaldo Damus	HAI	North Texas SC	5
6	Jake Keegan	USA	Greenville Triumph SC	5
6	Alex Morrell	USA	Greenville Triumph SC	5
9	Shak Adams	VIN	FC Tucson	4
9	Josh Coan	USA	FC Tucson	4
9	Nicolas Firmino	BRA	New England Revolution II	4
9	Mark Hernández	USA	Chattanooga Red Wolves SC	4
9	Justin Rennicks	USA	New England Revolution II	4
9	Michael Vang	LAO	Forward Madison FC	4
9	Nil Vinyals	ESP	Tormenta FC	4

=== Top assists ===
Rank	Player	Nation	Club	Assists
1	Alex Morrell	USA	Greenville Triumph SC	6
1	Ethan Vanacore-Decker	USA	Union Omaha	6
3	Charlie Dennis	ENG	FC Tucson	5
4	Mark Hernández	USA	Chattanooga Red Wolves SC	4
4	Ryley Kraft	USA	Richmond Kickers	4
4	Paulo Jr.	BRA	Forward Madison FC	4
4	Eduardo Sosa	VEN	Fort Lauderdale CF	4
4	Moises Tablante	VEN	Orlando City B	4
9	Ian Antley	USA	Richmond Kickers	3
9	Edison Azcona	DOM	Fort Lauderdale CF	3
9	Matt Bolduc	USA	Richmond Kickers	3
9	Ronaldo Damus	HAI	North Texas SC	3
9	Azaad Liadi	USA	FC Tucson	3
9	Omar Mohamed	SOM	Greenville Triumph SC	3
9	Don Smart	JAM	Forward Madison FC	3

=== Clean sheets ===
Rank	Player	Nation	Club	Clean sheets
1	Dallas Jaye	GUM	Greenville Triumph SC	9
2	Rashid Nuhu	GHA	Union Omaha	6
3	Pablo Jara	CHI	Tormenta FC	4
4	Carlos Avilez	MEX	North Texas SC	3
4	Chris Brady	USA	Forward Madison FC	3
4	Akira Fitzgerald	JPN	Richmond Kickers	3
4	Alex Mangels	USA	Chattanooga Red Wolves SC	3
4	Philipp Marceta	AUT	Forward Madison FC	3
4	Joe Rice	USA	New England Revolution II	3
10	Amal Knight	JAM	FC Tucson	2
10	Carlos Merancio	MEX	FC Tucson	2

=== Hat-tricks ===
Player	Nation	Club	Against	Result	Date
None

== League awards ==
=== Individual awards ===
- Most Valuable Player: (Argentina) Emiliano Terzaghi (RIC)
- Defender of the Year: (United States) Brandon Fricke (GVL)
- Young Player of the Year: (United States) Chris Brady (MAD)
- Goalkeeper of the Year: (Guam) Dallas Jaye (GVL)
- Coach of the Year: (United States) John Harkes (GVL)
- Golden Boot: (Argentina) Emiliano Terzaghi (RIC)
- Assists Champion: (United States) Ethan Vanacore-Decker (OMA)
- Golden Glove: (Guam) Dallas Jaye (GVL)
- Goal of the Year: (United States) Josh Coan (TUC)
- Save of the Year: (United States) Joe Rice (NEW)

=== All-League Teams ===
First team
Goalkeeper	Defenders	Midfielders	Forwards
(Guam) Dallas Jaye (GVL) (Goalkeeper of the Year and Golden Glove)	(United States) Justin Che (NTX) (United States) Brandon Fricke (GVL) (Defender of the Year) (United States) Tyler Polak (GVL) (Spain) Damià Viader (OMA)	(United States) Evan Conway (OMA) (United States) Noah Pilato (GVL) (Venezuela) Eduardo Sosa (FTL)	(Scotland) Greg Hurst (CHA) (Argentina) Emiliano Terzaghi (RIC) (MVP and Golden Boot) (United States) Alex Morrell (GVL)

Second team
Goalkeeper	Defenders	Midfielders	Forwards
(Ghana) Rashid Nuhu (OMA)	(Jamaica) Ian Fray (FTL) (United States) Ricky Ruiz (CHA) (United States) Connor Tobin (MAD) (United States) Collin Verfurth (NEW)	(Brazil) Nicolas Firmino (NEW) (Brazil) Maciel (NEW) (Italy) Marco Micaletto (TRM)	(Dominican Republic) Edison Azcona (FTL) (Australia) Lachlan McLean (GVL) (United States) Ethan Vanacore-Decker (OMA) (Assists Champion)

=== Monthly awards ===
Month	Player of the Month			Goal of the Month			Save of the Month		Coach of the Month		References
Month	Player	Club	Position	Player	Club	Position	Goalkeeper	Club	Coach	Club	References
July	(United States) Jake Keegan	Greenville Triumph SC	Forward	(Argentina) Emiliano Terzaghi	Richmond Kickers	Forward	(Guam) Dallas Jaye	Greenville Triumph SC	(United States) John Harkes	Greenville Triumph SC	
August	(United States) Ethan Vanacore-Decker	Union Omaha	Forward	(United States) Ricky Lopez-Espin	Fort Lauderdale CF	Forward	(United States) Sam Howard	Union Omaha	(United States) Darren Sawatzky	Richmond Kickers	
September	(Argentina) Emiliano Terzaghi	Richmond Kickers	Forward	(United States) Noah Pilato	Greenville Triumph SC	Midfielder	(United States) Joe Rice	New England Revolution II	(United States) John Harkes	Greenville Triumph SC	
October	(United States) Evan Conway	Union Omaha	Forward	(Brazil) Nicolas Firmino	New England Revolution II	Midfielder	(United States) Austin Aviza	Orlando City B	(United States) Eric Quill	North Texas SC	

=== Weekly awards ===
Player of the Week
Week	Player	Club	Position	Ref.
1	(United States) Alex Morrell	Greenville Triumph SC	Forward	
2	(United States) Jake Keegan	Greenville Triumph SC	Forward	
3	(Spain) Nil Vinyals	Tormenta FC	Forward	
4	(United States) Ethan Vanacore-Decker	Union Omaha	Forward	
5	(Jamaica) Don Smart	Forward Madison FC	Midfielder	
6	(United States) Azaad Liadi	FC Tucson	Forward	
7	(United States) Mark Hernández	Chattanooga Red Wolves SC	Midfielder	
8	(United States) Alex Morrell	Greenville Triumph SC	Forward	
9	(Algeria) Sami Guediri	Fort Lauderdale CF	Defender	
10	(England) Curtis Thorn	Tormenta FC	Defender	
11	(Brazil) Ivan Magalhães	Richmond Kickers	Defender	
12	(Haiti) Ronaldo Damus	North Texas SC	Forward	
13	(Brazil) Nicolas Firmino	New England Revolution II	Midfielder	
14	(United States) Josh Coan	FC Tucson	Forward	
15	(United States) Alex Morrell	Greenville Triumph SC	Forward	

Goal of the Week
Week	Player	Club	Opponent	Ref.
1	(United States) Alex Morrell	Greenville Triumph SC	Fort Lauderdale CF	
2	(Argentina) Emiliano Terzaghi	Richmond Kickers	Greenville Triumph SC	
3	(Spain) Nil Vinyals	Tormenta FC	Orlando City B	
4	(United States) Ricky Lopez-Espin	Fort Lauderdale CF	Tormenta FC	
5	(Brazil) Ivan Magalhaes	Richmond Kickers	FC Tucson	
6	(United States) Edwin Cerrillo	North Texas SC	Union Omaha	
7	(United States) Devin Boyce	Union Omaha	FC Tucson	
8	(Chile) Adolfo Ovalle	Forward Madison FC	New England Revolution II	
9	(Dominican Republic) Edison Azcona	Fort Lauderdale CF	Orlando City B	
10	(United States) Noah Pilato	Greenville Triumph SC	Chattanooga Red Wolves SC	
11	(United States) Josh Coan	FC Tucson	Forward Madison FC	
12	(United States) JP Scearce	Union Omaha	Tormenta FC	
13	(Brazil) Nicolas Firmino	New England Revolution II	Fort Lauderdale CF	
14	(Guatemala) Damian Rivera	New England Revolution II	North Texas SC	
15	(United States) Evan Conway	Union Omaha	Fort Lauderdale CF	

Save of the Week
Week	Player	Club	Opponent	Ref.
1	(Guam) Dallas Jaye	Greenville Triumph SC	Fort Lauderdale CF	
2	(United States) Dylan Castanheira	Fort Lauderdale CF	FC Tucson	
3	(United States) Austin Aviza	Orlando City B	Tormenta FC	
4	(United States) Dylan Castanheira	Fort Lauderdale CF	Tormenta FC	
5	(United States) Joe Rice	New England Revolution II	North Texas SC	
6	(Guam) Dallas Jaye	Greenville Triumph SC	Fort Lauderdale CF	
7	(United States) Sam Howard	Union Omaha	FC Tucson	
8	(United States) Joe Rice	New England Revolution II	Forward Madison FC	
9	(Guam) Dallas Jaye	Greenville Triumph SC	Forward Madison FC	
10	(United States) Dylan Castanheira	Fort Lauderdale CF	Tormenta FC	
11	(Ghana) Rashid Nuhu	Union Omaha	Richmond Kickers	
12	(United States) Austin Aviza	Orlando City B	Greenville Triumph SC	
13	(Guam) Dallas Jaye	Greenville Triumph SC	FC Tucson	
14	(United States) Austin Aviza	Orlando City B	FC Tucson	
15	(United States) Austin Aviza	Orlando City B	Richmond Kickers	

Team of the Week
Week	Goalkeeper	Defenders	Midfielders	Forwards	Ref.
**1**	No Award				
**2**	(United States) Rice (NEW)	(United States) Jackson (TRM) (United States) Batista (NTX) (Brazil) Eliverton (TUC) (United States) Polak (GVL)	(Italy) Micaletto (TRM) (United States) Pineda (CHA) (United States) Boyce (OMA)	(Scotland) Hurst (CHA) (United States) Liadi (TUC) (United States) **Keegan** (GVL)	
**3**	(Japan) Fitzgerald (RIC)	(Mexico) Diaz (MAD) (United States) Mueller (TRM) (United States) Folla (CHA) (Spain) Viader (OMA)	(Spain) **Vinyals** (TRM) (Austria) Mayr (TRM) (United States) Walker (GVL)	(United States) Vanacore-Decker (OMA) (United States) Conway (OMA) (Scotland) Hurst (CHA)	
**4**	(Guam) Jaye (GVL)	(United States) Antley (RIC) (Colombia) Rodas (ORL) (United States) Hauswirth (OMA)	(Venezuela) Sosa (FTL) (Argentina) Terzaghi (RIC) (United States) Soto (CHA)	(Venezuela) Tablante (ORL) (United States) **Vanacore-Decker** (OMA) (Scotland) Hurst (CHA) (United States) Redzic (NTX)	
**5**	(Guam) Jaye (GVL)	(Brazil) Magalhães (RIC) (Trinidad and Tobago) Trimmingham (MAD) (Mexico) Álvarez (NTX)	(Puerto Rico) Angking (NEW) (Brazil) Paulo Jr. (MAD) (Jamaica) **Smart** (MAD) (United States) Roberts (NTX) (Argentina) Terzaghi (RIC)	(Puerto Rico) Rivera (ORL) (Australia) McLean (GVL)	
**6**	(Chile) Jara (TRM)	(United States) Polak (GVL) (United States) Antley (RIC) (United States) Lockaby (MAD)	(Italy) Micaletto (TRM) (Argentina) Contreras (OMA) (Venezuela) Sosa (FTL) (United States) Pilato (GVL)	(United States) Adams (TUC) (United States) **Liadi** (TUC) (United States) Lopez-Espin (FTL)	
**7**	(United States) Rice (NEW)	(England) Skelton (TRM) (United States) Ruiz (CHA) (Spain) Viader (OMA)	(United States) Boyce (OMA) (United States) Aguilera (ORL) (United States) Kraft (RIC) (Argentina) Terzaghi (RIC)	(United States) **Hernández** (CHA) (Brazil) Firmino (NEW) (United States) Zacarías (CHA)	
**8**	(Ghana) Nuhu (OMA)	(United States) Ruiz (CHA) (Japan) Toyama (MAD) (Jamaica) Fray (FTL)	(United States) Boyce (OMA) (United States) Kraft (RIC) (United States) Conway (OMA) (Laos) Vang (MAD)	(United States) **Morrell** (GVL) (Argentina) Terzaghi (RIC) (Australia) McLean (GVL)	
**9**	(United States) Zuluaga (FTL)	(United States) Murillo (GVL) (Algeria) **Guediri** (FTL) (Democratic Republic of the Congo) Sousa (OMA) (United States) Ricketts (CHA)	(United States) Walker (GVL) (United States) Dieterich (CHA) (United States) Hernández (CHA)	(United States) Smith (NTX) (Australia) McLean (GVL) (Dominican Republic) Azcona (FTL)	
**10**	(Chile) Jara (TRM)	(England) **Thorn** (TRM) (United States) Spaulding (NEW) (United States) Fricke (GVL)	(United States) Pilato (GVL) (England) Dennis (TUC) (Italy) Micaletto (TRM) (United States) Hernandez (NTX)	(Brazil) Elivelton (TUC) (United States) Zacarías (CHA) (Brazil) Firmino (NEW)	
**11**	(Jamaica) Knight (TUC)	(Brazil) **Magalhães** (RIC) (United States) Lee (GVL) (Algeria) Guediri (FTL)	(Portugal) Mendonca (NEW) (United States) Kraft (RIC) (Venezuela) Sosa (FTL) (Costa Rica) Sinclair (NEW) (Argentina) Terzaghi (RIC)	(United States) Keegan (GVL) (Laos) Vang (MAD)	
**12**	(Mexico) Avilez (NTX)	(United States) Murillo (GVL) (United States) Spaulding (NEW) (United States) Waldeck (NTX)	(United States) Morrell (GVL) (Portugal) Mendonca (NEW) (Kenya) Otieno (OMA) (Brazil) Maciel (NEW)	(Haiti) **Damus** (NTX) (United States) Conway (OMA) (Australia) McLean (GVL)	
**13**	(Mexico) Merancio (TUC)	(United States) Munjoma (NTX) (Portugal) Mendonca (NEW) (United States) Burgess (NTX)	(Somalia) Mohamed (GVL) (Argentina) Terzaghi (RIC) (United States) Bolanos (RIC) (Brazil) **Firmino** (NEW)	(United States) Ramos-Godoy (TUC) (Australia) McLean (GVL) (England) Bruce (NTX)	
**14**	(Ghana) Nuhu (OMA)	(England) Skelton (TRM) (Germany) Biek (TUC) (Democratic Republic of the Congo) Sousa (OMA)	(Spain) Vinyals (TRM) (El Salvador) Molina (OMA) (Mexico) Rodriguez (NTX) (England) Dennis (TUC)	(United States) Conway (OMA) (United States) **Coan** (TUC) (Brazil) Paulo Jr. (MAD)	
**15**	(Mexico) Avilez (NTX)	(Japan) Toyama (MAD) (United States) Lee (GVL) (United States) Waldeck (NTX)	(United States) Boyce (OMA) (United States) Munjoma (NTX) (United States) **Morrell** (GVL) (Zambia) Mwape (RIC)	(Australia) Phelps (TRM) (Scotland) Hurst (CHA) (United States) Conway (OMA)	
**Bold** denotes Player of the Week

== See also ==
- USL League One
- 2020 USL Championship season
