= 2020 Tormenta FC season =

Tormenta FC
2020 season
- Owner: Van Tassell Group
- Head coach: John Miglarese
- Stadium: Eagle Field at Erk Russell Park
- USL League One: 8th
- USL1 Playoffs: Did not qualify
- U.S. Open Cup: Cancelled
- Average home league attendance: 400
- Biggest win: TRM 4–0 NE (October 21)
- Biggest defeat: MAD 4–0 TRM (August 14)

The 2020 Tormenta FC season was the club's fifth season of existence, and their second season as a professional club. It was their second season playing in the third tier of American soccer and their second season playing in USL League One (USL1). This article covers the period from October 20, 2019, the day after the 2019 USL1 Playoff Final, to the conclusion of the 2020 USL1 Playoff Final, scheduled for October 22–25, 2020.

== Club ==
=== Roster ===
As of April 19, 2020

No.	Position	Nation	Player
1	GK	CHI	Pablo Jara
2	DF	USA	Rhys Williams
3	DF	USA	Stefan Mueller
4	DF	USA	Lars Eckenrode
5	DF	AUS	Joshua Phelps
6	MF	USA	Ricardo Gómez
7	MF	AUT	Luca Mayr-Fälten
8	MF	ESP	Nil Vinyals
9	FW	IRL	Mikie Rowe
10	MF	ITA	Marco Micaletto
11	FW	USA	Daniel Jackson
12	MF	USA	Abuchi Obinwa
15	DF	ENG	Jordan Skelton
16	FW	USA	Devyn Jambga
18	DF	ENG	Michael O'Sullivan
19	FW	MEX	Pato Botello Faz
21	MF	USA	Jad Arslan
22	MF	BRA	Lucas Coutinho
27	MF	USA	Tristan DeLoach
28	MF	USA	Grant Hampton
30	GK	USA	Stephen O'Hearn

USL Academy Contract

== Competitions ==
=== Exhibitions ===
February 12 Preseason 1	Charlotte Independence	2–4	Tormenta FC	Columbia, South Carolina
5:00 PM EDT	(pen.)	Report	Vinyals (Mayr-Fälten); Micaletto (pen.)	Stadium: SCUFC Monticello Road Soccer Center

February 23 Preseason 2	Tampa Bay Rowdies	2–3	Tormenta FC	St. Petersburg, Florida
2:00 PM EDT	Mkosana 57' (pen.); Lachowecki 60'	Report	Mayr-Fälten 1'; Micaletto 28'; Coutinho 33'	Stadium: Al Lang Stadium

February 28 Preseason 3	Tormenta FC	v	Charleston Battery	Statesboro, Georgia
7:00 PM EDT				Stadium: Eagle Field

=== USL League One ===
==== Standings ====
Pos	Team	Pld	W	L	D	GF	GA	GD	Pts	PPG
6	FC Tucson	16	6	6	4	21	19	+2	22	1.38
7	Forward Madison FC	16	5	5	6	20	14	+6	21	1.31
8	Tormenta FC	16	5	7	4	19	22	−3	19	1.19
9	New England Revolution II (Note: Professional teams that are owned by teams playing in a higher division are ineligible for the U.S. Open Cup.)	16	5	8	3	19	26	−7	18	1.13
10	Fort Lauderdale CF	16	4	9	3	19	28	−9	15	0.94

Source: 2020 USL League One standings
Rules for classification: 1) points; 2) total wins; 3) total goal differential; 4) total goals scored; 5) points earned against top four Conference finishers; 6) disciplinary points; 7) coin toss or drawing of lots

==== Match results ====
July 25 1	Tormenta FC	2–2	Chattanooga Red Wolves SC	Statesboro, Georgia
8:00 PM EDT	Micaletto 7', (yellow card) 26'; Mayr-Fälten (yellow card) 16'; Rowe (yellow card) 71'; Jackson 90+1'	Report	Hurst (yellow card) 28', (goal) 52', 61'; Ruiz (yellow card) 42'; Pineda (yellow card) 82'; Ualefi (yellow card) 83'; Hernandez (yellow card) 90+3'	Stadium: Eagle Field at Erk Russell Athletic Park; Attendance: 400; Referee: Sergii Demianchuk

July 28 2	Tormenta FC	0–0	Richmond Kickers	Statesboro, Georgia
7:00 PM EDT	Mueller (yellow card) 7'; Skelton (yellow card) 66'; Micaletto (yellow card) 76'	Report	Falck (yellow card) 13'; Mwape (yellow card) 90+1'	Stadium: Eagle Field; Attendance: 400; Referee: Kyle Johnston

August 1 3	Tormenta FC	2–0	Orlando City B	Statesboro, Georgia
8:00 PM EDT	Skelton (yellow card) 6'; Obinwa (yellow card) 45+1'; Vinyals 56', 70'	Report	Tablante (yellow card) 41'; Rivera (yellow card) 44'	Stadium: Erk Russell Park; Attendance: 400; Referee: Joshua Belk

August 5 4	Greenville Triumph SC	1–0	Tormenta FC	Greenville, South Carolina
7:00 PM EDT	Donnelly 90+1'	Report	Skelton (yellow card) 32'; Gómez (yellow card) 74'; Williams (yellow card) 90+4'	Stadium: Legacy Early College Field; Referee: Izlen Peksenar

August 8 5	Tormenta FC	1–2	Fort Lauderdale CF	Statesboro, Georgia
8:00 PM EDT	Micaletto (yellow card) 35'; Skelton (yellow card) 57'; Rowe 90+3', (yellow card) 90+3'	Report	Hardin (yellow card) 27'; Castanheira (yellow card) 27'; Azcona 41'; Lopez-Espin 76'; Raggio (yellow card) 90+5'; Cuartas (yellow card) 90+6'	Stadium: Eagle Field; Attendance: 400; Referee: Kevin Broadley

August 14 6	Forward Madison FC	4–0	Tormenta FC	Madison, Wisconsin
8:00 PM EDT	Vang 8', (yellow card) 60'; Smart 23'; Wojcik 58'; Paulo Jr. 69'	Report	Obinwa (yellow card) 86'	Stadium: Breese Stevens Field; Referee: Calin Radosav

August 22 7	Chattanooga Red Wolves SC	1–2	Tormenta FC	East Ridge, Tennessee
1:00 PM EDT	Hurst 26'; Folla (yellow card) 39'; Ramos (yellow card) 84'	Report	Vinyals (yellow card) 17'; Micaletto (yellow card) 36', (goal) 79' (pen.); Phelps (yellow card) 41'; Mayr-Fälten 82'; DeLoach (red card) 90+1'; Jara (yellow card) 90+6'	Stadium: CHI Memorial Stadium; Attendance: 770; Referee: Richonne Clark

August 28 8	Orlando City B	1–1	Tormenta FC	Kissimmee, Florida
7:00 PM EDT	O'Callaghan (yellow card) 27'; Aguilera 63' (pen.); Tablante (yellow card) 87'	Report	Aviza 29' (o.g.); Phelps (yellow card) 49' (yellow-red card) 61'; Obinwa (yellow card) 85'	Stadium: Osceola County Stadium; Referee: Johan Fredrik Roenning

September 4 9	Tormenta FC	1–2	Greenville Triumph SC	Statesboro, Georgia
8:00 PM EDT	Gómez (yellow card) 26'; Mayr-Fälten (yellow card) 73'; Williams (yellow card) 75'; Arslan 78'	Report	McLean 13'; Morrell 36'; Donnelly (yellow card) 90+4'	Stadium: Eagle Field at Erk Russell Athletic Park; Attendance: 400; Referee: Izlen Peksenar

September 11 10	Tormenta FC	2–2	Union Omaha	Statesboro, Georgia
8:00 PM EDT	Mayr-Fälten 11'; Nuhu 22' (o.g.); Arslan (yellow card) 63'; Micaletto (yellow card) 74'	Report	Sousa (yellow card) 62', (goal) 81'; N'For 70'	Stadium: Eagle Field at Erk Russell Athletic Park; Attendance: 400; Referee: Sergii Demianchuk

September 19 11	Fort Lauderdale CF	1–2	Tormenta FC	Fort Lauderdale, Florida
8:00 PM EDT	Azcona 5'; Makoun (yellow card) 24'; Fray (yellow card) 40'; Guediri (yellow card) 60'; Sosa (yellow card) 90+7'	Report	Thorn 19'; Mayr-Fälten 62'; Skelton (yellow card) 83' (yellow-red card) 90+4'	Stadium: Inter Miami CF Stadium; Referee: Jonathan Bilinski

October 3 12	Union Omaha	3–0	Tormenta FC	Papillion, Nebraska
8:00 PM EDT	Conway 38'; Viader 78'; Scearce 83'	Report	Mueller (yellow card) 53'	Stadium: Werner Park; Attendance: 2,600; Referee: Chris Ruska

October 7 13	Tormenta FC	0–1	FC Tucson	Statesboro, Georgia
7:00 PM EDT	Skelton (yellow card) 19'; Williams (yellow card) 68'; Rowe (yellow card) 90+4'	Report	Ramos-Godoy 34'; Biek (yellow card) 67'; Logue (yellow card) 90+4'	Stadium: Eagle Field at Erk Russell Athletic Park; Attendance: 400; Referee: Joshua Belk

October 17 14	Richmond Kickers	0–1	Tormenta FC	Richmond, Virginia
18:30 EDT		Report	Phelps (yellow card) 45+1'; Micaletto 45+4', (yellow card) 88' (yellow-red card) 90+2'; Coutinho (yellow card) 90+1'; Eckenrode (yellow card) 90+3'	Stadium: City Stadium; Attendance: 875; Referee: Matthew Franz

October 21 15	Tormenta FC	4–0	New England Revolution II	Statesboro, Georgia
8:00 PM EDT	Vinyals 18'; Phelps 29'; Arslan 34'; DeLoach (yellow card) 80'; Jambga 81'	Report	Bell (yellow card) 36'	Stadium: Eagle Field; Attendance: 400; Referee: Kyle Johnston

October 24 16	North Texas SC	2–1	Tormenta FC	Arlington, Texas
9:30 PM EDT	Do. Hernandez 47'; Burgess (yellow card) 90+5'; Munjoma 90+6', (yellow card) 90+8'	Report	Vinyals 45+3'; Micaletto (yellow card) 90'	Stadium: Globe Life Park; Attendance: 898; Referee: Matthew Corrigan

=== U.S. Open Cup ===
As a USL League One club, Tormenta will enter the competition in the Second Round, to be played April 7–9.

April 8 2nd round	Charleston Battery (South Carolina)	P–P	(Georgia (U.S. state)) Tormenta FC	Mount Pleasant, South Carolina
7:00 PM EDT				Stadium: Patriots Point Soccer Complex
Note: Match postponed due to the COVID-19 pandemic
