= Colin Stripling =

American soccer player

Personal information
- Date of birth: October 27, 1994 (age 32)
- Place of birth: Scotch Plains, New Jersey, United States
- Height: 1.88 m (6 ft 2 in)
- Position: Midfielder

Team information
- Current team: Mura
- Number: 5

College career
Years	Team	Apps	(Gls)
2013–2017	Monmouth Hawks	71	(15)

Senior career*
Years	Team	Apps	(Gls)
2017	Seattle Sounders FC U-23	3	(0)
2019	FC Tucson	10	(0)
2020	Greenville Triumph	11	(0)
2021	Stumptown AC	18	(3)
2022–2023	Chattanooga FC	18	(2)
2024–	Mura	40	(1)
- * Club domestic league appearances and goals as of April 1, 2023

Colin Stripling (born October 27, 1994) is an American soccer player who plays as a midfielder for Slovenian PrvaLiga club Mura.

== Career ==
In early 2019 Stripling signed a contract with FC Tucson ahead of its first season in USL League One. He made his professional debut on March 30 as an 85th-minute substitute in a 3–1 win over Orlando City B.

Following the end of the 2019 season Stripling was signed by fellow USL1 side Greenville Triumph SC on December 16 ahead of the 2020 season. He went on to make 11 appearances for the squad during the season. On December 10, 2020, the team announced it had declined a contract option on him.

On August 3, 2021, Stripling signed for Stumptown AC of the National Independent Soccer Association.

== Career statistics ==
=== Club ===
As of match played September 4, 2021

Appearances and goals by club, season and competition
Club	Season	League			Playoffs		Cup		Continental		Total	
Club	Season	Division	Apps	Goals	Apps	Goals	Apps	Goals	Apps	Goals	Apps	Goals
FC Tucson	2019	USL1	10	0	0	0	–		–		10	0
Greenville Triumph	2020	USL1	11	0	0	0	–		–		11	0
Stumptown AC	2021	NISA	6	1	–		–		–		6	1
Career total			27	1	0	0	0	0	0	0	27	1

== Honors ==
Greenville Triumph SC

- USL League One Champion: 2020
