= Abdi Mohamed =

Somali footballer (born 1996)

Personal information
- Full name: Abdirizak Sheikuna Mohamed
- Date of birth: 25 October 1996 (age 30)
- Place of birth: Nairobi, Kenya
- Height: 6 ft 0 in (1.83 m)
- Position: Defender

Youth career
- Classics Eagles

College career
Years	Team	Apps	(Gls)
2015–2017	Ohio State Buckeyes	58	(9)
2018	Akron Zips	24	(1)

Senior career*
Years	Team	Apps	(Gls)
2019	New York City	0	(0)
2019	→ Memphis 901 (loan)	21	(0)
2020–2021	Greenville Triumph	31	(0)
2022–2023	Columbus Crew 2	47	(2)
2024	New Mexico United	22	(3)
2025	Oakland Roots	8	(0)

International career^{‡}
2019–	Somalia	7	(0)
- * Club domestic league appearances and goals as of 15:48, 30 October 2025 (UTC) ‡ National team caps and goals as of 10 May 2024 (UTC)

Abdirizak Sheikuna Mohamed (Somali: Cabdi Maxamed; born 25 October 1996) is a Somali professional footballer who plays for the Somalia national team.

== Career ==
=== Youth ===
Mohamed played youth soccer for the Classics Eagles in Columbus, Ohio and high school soccer at Westerville Central High School. He was named All-State for the 2014 Ohio high school soccer season.

He played college soccer at Ohio State University for 3 years before transferring to the University of Akron for his final year.

=== Professional ===
Mohamed was drafted by New York City FC with the 43rd overall pick in the 2nd round of the 2019 MLS SuperDraft.

He signed his first professional contract with NYCFC and was then transferred to USL Championship side Memphis 901 on a 2019 season-long loan.

In February 2020 Mohamed signed with USL League One side Greenville Triumph SC. The following the season, in which Triumph SC won the 2020 USL League One championship, Mohamed was named to the League One All-League Second Team.

The Columbus Crew 2 in MLS Next Pro signed Mohamed in February 2022.

On May 3, 2024, it was announced that Mohamed had signed a 25-day contract with New Mexico United in the USL Championship. He made his debut for the club on the next day, May 4, vs Las Vegas Lights FC and assisted on the game-winning goal by teammate Daniel Bruce. On May 28, 2024 the club announced Mohamed had signed for the remainder of the 2024 season.

He registered his first goal for New Mexico, heading home the equalizer, in a 3-2 comeback victory vs San Antonio FC on 29 June 2024

=== International career ===
Mohamed was born a refugee in Kenya to Somali parents and was raised in the United States. In September 2019, Mohamed was called into the Somalia national football team for its 2022 World Cup qualifiers against Zimbabwe. On 5 September, he made his international debut for Somalia in their 1–0 win over Zimbabwe.

== Career statistics ==
=== Club ===
As of 2 December 2024

Appearances and goals by club, season and competition
Club	Season	League			National Cup		Continental		Other		Total	
Club	Season	Division	Apps	Goals	Apps	Goals	Apps	Goals	Apps	Goals	Apps	Goals
New York City	2019	MLS	–		–		–		–		–	
Memphis 901 (loan)	2019	USL Championship	21	0	2	0	–		–		23	0
Greenville Triumph	2020	USL League One	7	0	–		–		–		7	0
Greenville Triumph	2021	USL League One	26	0	–		–		–		26	0
Greenville Triumph	Total		33	0	–		–		–		33	0
Columbus Crew 2	2022	MLS Next Pro	25	0	–		–		–		25	0
Columbus Crew 2	2023	MLS Next Pro	29	2	–		–		–		29	2
Columbus Crew 2	Total		54	2	–		–		–		54	2
New Mexico United	2024	USL Championship	22	3	3	0	–		–		25	3
Career total			130	5	5	0	–		–		135	5

=== International ===
As of matches played 10 May 2024

Appearances and goals by national team and year
National team	Year	Apps	Goals
Somalia	2019	1	0
Somalia	2020	0	0
Somalia	2021	0	0
Somalia	2022	2	0
Somalia	2023	2	0
Somalia	2024	2	0
Total		7	0

== Honours ==
Greenville Triumph SC

- USL League One Champions: 2020

Columbus Crew 2

- MLS Next Pro Champions: 2022
