= Eastside High School (Taylors, South Carolina) =

Location
- 1300 Brushy Creek Road; Taylors, South Carolina 29687; United States; 34°53′37″N 82°18′4″W

Information
- Type: Comprehensive high school
- Motto: Engaging Minds. Embracing Community.
- Established: 1970 (56 years ago)
- NCES School ID: 450231000563
- Principal: Todd Stafford
- Faculty: 131 (5 Administrators, 85 teachers, 41 support staff)
- Teaching staff: 77.00 (on an FTE basis)
- Grades: 9–12
- Enrollment: 1,490 (2024–25)
- Student to teacher ratio: 19.35
- Colors: Royal blue, white and gold
- Mascot: Eagle
- Yearbook: Aurea Aquilla
- Website: www.greenville.k12.sc.us/eastside/

Eastside High School (EHS) is a public high school located in Taylors, a suburb of Greenville, South Carolina, United States. It is a public school under the jurisdiction of the Greenville County School District.

== Facilities ==
Eastside High School's campus is home to a 500-seat auditorium, choral and band/strings rooms, two Art studios, and a kiln room. It also includes a 1500 seat gymnasium, a secondary gymnasium, a courtyard, a lighted football stadium, as well as other athletic rooms and fields.

== History ==
Eastside High School opened its doors in August of 1970. Students from Wade Hampton, Lincoln, Greer, and J.L. Mann High attended the new school.

During the first year, Eastside High School established its school colors of royal blue and gold, chose the eagle as its mascot, decided on a motto, printed its first newspaper (known as The Eagle's Cry), and began its yearbook (Aurea Aquilla). The school's chapter of the National Honor Society and marching band.

In the 1980s, Eastside High School became home to the first Computer Lab in Greenville County Schools. In the 1990s, Eastside High's football stadium was reconstructed.

Around 2007, the majority of the old Eastside High School was demolished and the new school was built on land previously used for tennis courts and parking on the campus. Parts of the previous building were allowed to stay standing and received renovations.

== Feeder schools ==
The primary feeder middle school of Eastside High School is Northwood Middle School. The primary feeder elementary schools of Eastside High School are Brook Glenn Elementary School and Brushy Creek Elementary School.

== Non-core subject classes ==
In addition to the four traditional core-subject subjects (English, Math, Social Studies, and Science), Eastside High offers various classes in World Language, Fine Arts, Physical Education, and Career and Technical Education.

=== World Languages ===
Eastside High School offers two languages in its World Language Department for students to study. Spanish and French.

=== Fine Arts ===
Fine Arts classes at Eastside High School include orchestra, art, chorus, ceramics, band, and theatre.

=== Career and Technical Education ===
Career and Technical Education classes and/or pathways offered at Eastside High School include Sports Medicine, Web Design, Business, Entrepreneurship, Computer Science, education, and marketing.

=== Physical Education ===
In addition to Physical Education 1, which is a required course to be taken in South Carolina. The Physical Education department at Eastside High offers team sports and weightlifting classes.

== Principals ==
- John Durr: 1970–1973
- Eddie Jones: 1973–1975
- Dr. Leonard Pellicer: 1975–1977
- J. Brodie Bricker: 1977–1987
- Betty Workman: 1987–1988
- Dr. Lacy Wilkins: 1988–1993
- Ken Peake: 1993–1995
- Dave Quick: 1995–1998
- Buddy Blackmon: 1998–2000
- Sheryl Taylor: 2000–2006
- Dr. John Tharp: 2006–2010
- Mike Thorne: 2010–2019
- Tina Bishop: 2019–2024
- Todd Stafford: 2024–present

== Athletics ==
Eastside High School's teams have won many state championships. The sports that Eastside High School offers are listed below:

Sports offered at Eastside High School
Boys	Girls	Co-Ed
Cross Country	Cross Country	Competitive Cheer
Football	Golf	
Swimming	Swimming	
Volleyball	Tennis	
Basketball	Volleyball	
Wrestling	Basketball	
Baseball	Wrestling	
Golf	Lacrosse	
Lacrosse	Soccer	
Soccer	Softball	
Tennis	Track and Field	
Track and Field		

== Student clubs and organizations ==
Student clubs and organizations at Eastside High include an Academic Team, Aurea Aquilla Yearbook, Art Club, Astronomy Club, Baking Club, Beta Club, Book Club, Central Spirit Committee, DECA, Dungeon and Dragons Club, FCA, Film Making Club, Gardening Club, HOSA, Marching Band, Mock Trial, Mu Alpha Theta, National Honor Society, National English Honor Society, National Technical Honor Society, Science National Honor Society, French Honor Society, Spanish Honor Society, Tri-M Music Honor Society, Pickleball Club, Rock-climbing Club, Speech and Debate Team, STEM Club, and Student Government.

== Notable alumni ==
- Joe Erwin — entrepreneur and politician. Former chair of the South Carolina Democratic Party
- André Goodman — former NFL cornerback, played college football at the University of South Carolina
- George Jones - former NFL running back
- Paul Vogel - former NFL linebacker
