= Lachlan McLean (footballer) =

Australian soccer player

Personal information
- Date of birth: 28 March 1996 (age 30)
- Place of birth: Sydney, Australia
- Height: 1.83 m (6 ft 0 in)
- Position: Forward

Youth career
- 2013–2015: Manly United

College career
Years	Team	Apps	(Gls)
2016–2019	SIUE Cougars	61	(20)

Senior career*
Years	Team	Apps	(Gls)
2014	Manly United	1	(0)
2019	Chicago FC United	7	(1)
2020–2021	Greenville Triumph	30	(10)
2022	Northern Colorado Hailstorm	26	(4)
- * Club domestic league appearances and goals as of 9 October 2022

Lachlan McLean (born 28 March 1996) is an Australian former soccer player who played as a forward.

== Career ==
=== College ===
McLean began his collegiate career in 2016, moving to the United States to pursue a professional career after failing to secure a spot with an A-League team. He attended Southern Illinois University Edwardsville, and played for four years with the men's soccer program, earning Missouri Valley Conference All-Freshman team honours in his first season and Academic All-Mid-American Conference honours in his senior year.

=== Greenville Triumph ===
In February 2020 McLean was signed by the Greenville Triumph of USL League One, alongside defenders Cesar Murillo and Trevor Swartz. He made his debut for the club on 18 July 2020, coming on as an 83rd-minute substitute for Noah Pilato in a 2–0 victory over Fort Lauderdale CF.

=== Northern Colorado Hailstorm ===
On 17 December 2021 it was announced that McLean would join USL League One side Northern Colorado Hailstorm ahead of their inaugural season. Following the 2022 season, Northern Colorado declined his contract option. On 14 January 2023, McLean announced his retirement from professional soccer.
