= Ricardo Gómez (soccer, born 1995) =

American soccer player

Personal information
- Full name: Ricardo Gómez Espinoza
- Date of birth: November 14, 1995 (age 30)
- Place of birth: Gainesville, Georgia, United States
- Height: 1.70 m (5 ft 7 in)
- Position: Midfielder

College career
Years	Team	Apps	(Gls)
2014–2015	Apache Athletics		
2016–2017	South Florida Bulls	35	(3)

Senior career*
Years	Team	Apps	(Gls)
2017–2018	Myrtle Beach Mutiny	27	(2)
2019–2021	South Georgia Tormenta	67	(0)
- * Club domestic league appearances and goals as of November 2, 2021

Ricardo Gómez Espinoza (born November 14, 1995) is an American soccer player who plays as a midfielder for Tormenta FC in USL League One.

== Career ==
=== Tormenta FC ===
In October 2018, Gómez joined Tormenta FC ahead of their inaugural season in USL League One. He made his league debut for the club on March 29, 2019, in a 1–0 home victory over the Greenville Triumph.
