= Marco Micaletto =

Italian footballer (born 1996)

Personal information
- Date of birth: 19 January 1996 (age 30)
- Place of birth: Rome, Italy
- Position: Midfielder

Team information
- Current team: Tampa Bay Rowdies
- Number: 16

College career
Years	Team	Apps	(Gls)
2015–2017	Young Harris Mountain Lions	57	(21)
2018	Akron Zips	24	(1)

Senior career*
Years	Team	Apps	(Gls)
2016	Charlotte Eagles	13	(5)
2017	Reading United	7	(1)
2018–2022	South Georgia Tormenta	70	(22)
2022–2023	Columbus Crew 2	47	(17)
2024	New Mexico United	28	(1)
2025	Colorado Springs Switchbacks	25	(6)
2026–	Tampa Bay Rowdies	28	(7)
- * Club domestic league appearances and goals as of 00:21, 26 October 2026 (UTC)

Marco Micaletto (born 19 January 1996) is an Italian footballer who plays as a midfielder for USL Championship club Tampa Bay Rowdies.

== Early life and career ==
Born in Italy, Micaletto grew up in England and attended Bradfield College. Micaletto moved to the United States to play NCAA Division II college soccer for the Young Harris Mountain Lions. He played 57 games and scored 21 goals for the team before graduating. After graduating, Micaletto transferred to play for the Akron Zips. He played one season for the Zips, making 24 appearances and scoring one goal for the team. During his college career helped his teams win a Division II Peach Belt Conference Championship and a Mid-American Conference Tournament Championship.

Micaletto played for three USL League Two teams, Charlotte Eagles, Reading United, and South Georgia Tormenta FC.

== Professional career ==
=== Tormenta FC ===
After one season with Tormenta FC, Micaletto turned professional with the club in their first season with USL League One. After three seasons with the club at a professional level, Micaletto made over 70 appearances and scored over 20 goals.

After four seasons with South Georgia Tormenta, Micaletto joined MLS Next Pro club Columbus Crew 2 for an undisclosed fee in February 2022.

=== Columbus Crew 2 ===
On February 25, 2022, it was announced that Micaletto had joined the Columbus Crew organization and Columbus Crew 2. He was named the first ever captain of the reserve side. Micaletto made his debut for the organization in a 2–0 loss for Crew 2 against Inter Miami CF II.

He scored a goal in extra time of the first half and was named 2022 MLS Next Pro Cup MVP following Crew 2's 4–1 win over St. Louis City 2 at Lower.com Field. Crew 2 advanced to the MLS Next Pro Cup again in 2023 with Micaletto as captain, but his side fell 3–1 to Austin FC II

=== New Mexico United ===
Following two successful seasons with Crew 2, Micaletto signed with USL Championship side New Mexico United in December 2023. He scored his first goal for the club against El Paso Locomotive on 6 April 2024.

== Professional statistics ==
As of 30 October 2026

Team	Season	League			Cup (Note: Includes appearance(s) in U.S. Open Cup)		Other		Total	
Team	Season	Div	Apps	Goals	Apps	Goals	Apps	Goals	Apps	Goals
South Georgia Tormenta	2019	USL League One	27	8	1	0	0	0	28	8
South Georgia Tormenta	2020	USL League One	15	3	1	0	0	0	16	3
South Georgia Tormenta	2021	USL League One	28	11	–		0	0	28	11
South Georgia Tormenta	Total		70	22	2	0	0	0	72	22
Columbus Crew 2	2022	MLS Next Pro	23	9	–		3 (Note: Includes appearance(s) in MLS Next Pro Cup)	1	26	10
Columbus Crew 2	2023	MLS Next Pro	24	8	–		4	1	28	9
Columbus Crew 2	Total		47	17	0	0	7	2	54	19
New Mexico United	2024	USL Championship	28	1	4	0	2 (Note: Includes appearance(s) in USL Championship playoffs)	0	19	1
Colorado Springs Switchbacks	2025	USL Championship	25	6	2	1	3 (Note: Includes appearances in USL Cup)	0	30	7
Tampa Bay Rowdies	2026	USL Championship	26	5	0	0	6 (Note: Includes five appearances in USL Cup and one appearance in USL Championship playoffs)	0	32	5
Totals			196	51	8	1	19	2	221	55

== Honors ==
Columbus Crew 2

- MLS Next Pro Champions: 2022
