= Omar Mohamed =

Somali footballer (born 1996)

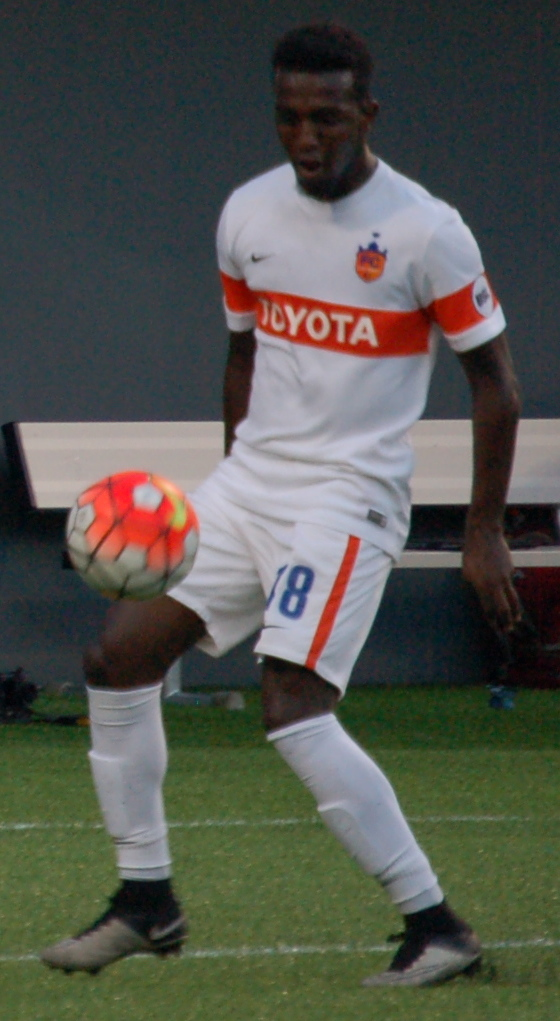
- Mohamed playing with FC Cincinnati in 2016

Personal information
- Full name: Omar Abdullahi Mohamed
- Date of birth: May 18, 1996 (age 30)
- Place of birth: Mogadishu, Somalia
- Height: 1.80 m (5 ft 11 in)
- Position: Midfielder

Youth career
- 2012–2013: Columbus Crew

College career
Years	Team	Apps	(Gls)
2015	Jackson College Jets	11	(6)

Senior career*
Years	Team	Apps	(Gls)
2016	FC Cincinnati	17	(0)
2017	Portland Timbers 2	27	(1)
2018	Des Moines Menace	15	(3)
2019–2020	Greenville Triumph	45	(1)
2021–2022	Menemenspor	14	(2)

International career^{‡}
2019–	Somalia	6	(2)
- * Club domestic league appearances and goals as of 21 May 2022 ‡ National team caps and goals as of 12:04, 17 December 2019 (UTC)

Omar Abdullahi Mohamed (Somali: Cumar Cabdullahi Maxamed; Arabic: عمر محمد; born 5 May 1996) is a Somali professional footballer who plays for the Somalia national team.

== Early life ==
Omer Muhamed was born in Mogadishu, Somalia, where he lived until the age of six when his family moved to Cairo, Egypt. He moved with his family to the United States in 2005 and grew up in Columbus, Ohio.

== Career ==
=== Early career ===
Mohamed first began playing organized soccer at the age of 12, where he played for local Columbus youth club FC Blast. At the age of 16, he began playing for the academy of Columbus Crew. He also trained and played with the first team of Columbus Crew, making four appearances for the Crew reserve team and scoring two goals. Mohamed also played one year of college soccer at Jackson College in 2015.

=== Professional ===
Mohamed signed with new United Soccer League club FC Cincinnati in January 2016.

Mohamed joined USL side Portland Timbers 2 in March 2017.

After spending time with USL League Two side Des Moines Menace, Mohamed joined USL League One side Greenville Triumph SC on February 8, 2019, ahead of their inaugural season.

Greenville opted to decline Mohamed's contract option following their 2020 season. He joined Menemenspor on January 22, 2021.

=== International ===
In September 2019, Mohamed was called into the Somalia national football team for its 2022 World Cup qualifiers against Zimbabwe. On September 5, 2019, he made his international debut for Somalia in their 1–0 win over Zimbabwe. On September 10, 2019, he scored his first international goal in Somalia's second leg qualifier against Zimbabwe at the Zimbabwe National Stadium in Harare.

In December 2019 He was again called into the Somalia national football team for Its participation in 2019 CECAFA Cup held in Kampala, Uganda. Mohamed played all the group matches for Somalia and scored the only goal Somalia has scored during the tournament. Somalia won against Burundi national football team, lost against Uganda national football team, while drawing against Djibouti national football team and Eritrea national football team without conceding a goal.

=== International goals ===
Scores and results list Somalia's goal tally first.

No.	Date	Venue	Opponent	Score	Result	Competition
1.	10 September 2019	National Sports Stadium, Harare, Zimbabwe	Zimbabwe	1–1	1–3	2022 FIFA World Cup qualification
2.	15 December 2019	StarTimes Stadium, Kampala, Uganda	Burundi	1–0	1–0	2019 CECAFA Cup
