= Joshua Phelps =

Australian soccer player (born 1993)

Josh Phelps
Personal information
- Full name: Joshua Kevin Phelps
- Date of birth: 10 February 1993 (age 33)
- Place of birth: Tamworth, New South Wales, Australia
- Height: 1.93 m (6 ft 4 in)
- Positions: Defender; forward

Team information
- Current team: Melbourne Knights

College career
Years	Team	Apps	(Gls)
2012–2013	Thomas Terriers	39	(7)
2014–2015	UNC Pembroke Braves	13	(4)

Senior career*
Years	Team	Apps	(Gls)
2017–2022	South Georgia Tormenta	109	(3)
2022–	Melbourne Knights	27	(3)
- * Club domestic league appearances and goals as of September 2, 2023

Joshua Kevin Phelps (born 10 February 1993) is an Australian footballer who plays as a defender for Melbourne Knights in the NPL Victoria.

== Career ==
=== Professional ===
After two seasons with the Tormenta in the PDL, Phelps became the club's first pro signing in September 2018. He made his professional debut for the club on 29 March 2019 in a 1–0 home victory over the Greenville Triumph. In December 2021, he signed a two-year contract extension with the club.

In early December 2022 it was announced Phelps would return to Australia to join NPL Victoria side Melbourne Knights ahead of their 2023 season, signing for an undisclosed fee.
