= JJ Donnelly =

English association football player

Personal information
- Full name: Joshua James Donnelly
- Date of birth: 6 March 1997 (age 29)
- Place of birth: London, England
- Height: 1.90 m (6 ft 3 in)
- Position: Forward

Youth career
- 2004–2013: Brentford
- 2013–2015: Dover Athletic

College career
Years	Team	Apps	(Gls)
2015–2016	EFSC Titans	36	(22)
2017–2018	Campbell Fighting Camels	36	(24)

Senior career*
Years	Team	Apps	(Gls)
2016	Jacksonville Armada U-23	8	(2)
2018	SIMA Águilas	12	(4)
2019	South Georgia Tormenta FC 2	12	(6)
2019–2021	Greenville Triumph	58	(15)
- * Club domestic league appearances and goals as of 25 June 2024

Joshua "JJ" Donnelly (born 6 March 1997) is an English footballer who plays as a forward.

== Career ==
Donnelly was a student at The Abbey School, Faversham and played academy football for Brentford and Dover Athletic.

=== College ===
Donnelly began playing college soccer at Eastern Florida State College, where he played two seasons before transferring to Campbell University in 2017.

While at college, Donnelly played with National Premier Soccer League side Jacksonville Armada U-23 in 2016, and USL PDL side SIMA Águilas in 2018.

Following college, Donnelly continued in the PDL, now rebranded as USL League Two, with South Georgia Tormenta FC 2.

=== Professional ===
On 8 August 2019, Donnelly signed for USL League One side Greenville Triumph SC. In September 2021, Donnelly suffered a season-ending knee injury in training.
