= Trevor Swartz =

American soccer player

Personal information
- Date of birth: October 1, 1995 (age 31)
- Place of birth: Cameron Park, California, United States
- Height: 5 ft 10 in (1.78 m)
- Position: Defender

Youth career
- El Dorado United
- –2014: Sacramento United

College career
Years	Team	Apps	(Gls)
2014–2018	Indiana Hoosiers	82	(12)

Senior career*
Years	Team	Apps	(Gls)
2017	Saint Louis FC U23	3	(0)
2019	Toronto FC II	6	(0)
2020	Greenville Triumph	9	(0)

Managerial career
- 2019: Sacramento State Hornets (volunteer asst.)
- 2020: DePaul Blue Demons (volunteer asst.)
- 2021: Claremont-Mudd-Scripps Stags (asst.)
- 2022: Claremont-Mudd-Scripps Stags
- 2023: UNLV Rebels (asst.)
- * Club domestic league appearances and goals as of April 10, 2021

Trevor Swartz (born October 1, 1995) is an American soccer coach who is currently an assistant coach at UNLV. He formerly was the head coach of the Claremont-Mudd-Scripps Stags.

== Early life ==
=== Youth ===
Swartz grew up in Cameron Park, California and enrolled at Ponderosa High School, playing soccer for Sacramento United and Placer United. He was invited to the High School Soccer "All America" game in 2013.

=== College ===
Swartz attended Indiana University, where he played college soccer as a midfielder for the Hoosiers from 2014 to 2018, tallying a total of 12 goals and 27 assists in 82 appearances. During his time at Indiana, Swartz was Second-Team All-Big Ten and led the NCAA in Total Assists and Assists per Game in 2018.

In July 2019, Swartz joined the Sacramento State men's soccer program as a volunteer assistant coach.

After spending the 2021 season as the Claremont-Mudd-Scripps Stags top assistant, Swartz was named CMS head coach on April 27, 2022.

== Career statistics ==
=== Club ===
As of May 18, 2019.

Club	Season	League			Cup		Continental		Other		Total	
Club	Season	Division	Apps	Goals	Apps	Goals	Apps	Goals	Apps	Goals	Apps	Goals
Saint Louis FC U23	2017	PDL	3	0	0	0	–		0	0	3	0
Toronto FC II	2019	MLS Next Pro	6	0	0	0	–		0	0	6	0
Career total			9	0	0	0	0	0	0	0	9	0
