= Cesar Murillo =

American soccer player

Personal information
- Date of birth: February 16, 1996 (age 30)
- Place of birth: El Paso, Texas, United States
- Position: Defender

Youth career
- 2011–2014: FC Dallas

College career
| Years | Team | Apps | (Gls) |
| 2014–2017 | Charleston Cougars | 66 | (2) |

Senior career*
| Years | Team | Apps | (Gls) |
| 2019 | North Texas SC | 12 | (0) |
| 2020 | Texas United | 1 | (0) |
| 2020–2021 | Greenville Triumph | 31 | (0) |
| 2022 | Forward Madison | 15 | (0) |
| 2023 | Lexington SC | 20 | (0) |
- * Club domestic league appearances and goals as of October 16, 2023

Cesar Murillo (born February 16, 1996) is an American soccer player who last played as a defender for Lexington SC in USL League One.

== Career ==
=== North Texas SC ===
Prior to the inaugural USL League One season, in March 2019, Murillo joined North Texas SC, signing a one-year deal with an option for a second. He made his professional debut on 5 May 2019, coming on as a 75th-minute substitute for Johan Gomez in a 1–0 away victory over Murillo's future club, the Greenville Triumph.

=== Greenville Triumph SC ===
In February 2020, Murillo moved to the Greenville Triumph on a free transfer.

=== Forward Madison FC ===
In February 2022, Forward Madison FC, also of USL League One, announced it had signed Murillo for the 2022 season.

=== Lexington SC ===
On March 15, 2023, Murillo signed with USL League One side Lexington SC ahead of their inaugural season.

== Honors ==
=== Club ===
North Texas SC

USL League One: 2019

Greenville Triumph SC

USL League One: 2020
