= Samuel Howard (soccer) =

American soccer player

Sam Howard
Personal information
- Full name: Samuel O'Connell Howard
- Date of birth: December 23, 1992 (age 33)
- Place of birth: Washington D.C., United States
- Height: 1.87 m (6 ft 2 in)
- Position: Goalkeeper

College career
Years	Team	Apps	(Gls)
2012	Kenyon Lords	0	(0)
2013–2014	La Salle Explorers	1	(0)
2015	Howard Bison	18	(0)

Senior career*
Years	Team	Apps	(Gls)
2014	Northern Virginia Royals		
2015	ASA Charge	3	(0)
2016–2017	IFK Åmål	68	(0)
2018–2019	Fresno FC	0	(0)
2020	Union Omaha	2	(0)
2021	OKC Energy	0	(0)
2022	Valley United	4	(0)
2022	Hartford Athletic	0	(0)
- * Club domestic league appearances and goals as of 22 July 2022

Samuel O'Connell Howard (born December 23, 1992) is an American soccer player who plays as a goalkeeper.

== Career ==
Howard attended La Salle University from 2013 to 2015. He graduated in 2015 and spent a graduate year at Howard University, making 92 saves in 18 appearances during the 2015 season. Howard also competed in the National Premier Soccer League for the ASA Charge in 2015.

Howard spent the 2016 and 2017 seasons with IFK Åmål in the Swedish lower leagues. He made 68 appearances for the Swedish club, compiling a 48–15–5 career record that included 16 total clean sheets.

Howard was signed by Fresno FC of the United Soccer League on April 13, 2018, for the remainder of the USL Season. Howard was signed after trialing with the Chicago Fire prior to the start of the 2018 Major League Soccer season. Howard was re-signed for the 2019 season, which was announced on 29 November 2018. Howard made no USL Championship appearances during the 2019 season, however he started both US Open Cup matches for the club, a 1–0 win again El Farolito in San Francisco, and a 1–0 extra time loss against Sacramento Republic.

On April 9, 2020, Howard joined USL League One side Union Omaha ahead of their inaugural season. He was released by Omaha following their 2020 season.

On February 24, 2021, Howard joined USL Championship club OKC Energy FC.

Howard signed with Hartford Athletic of the USL Championship on July 22, 2022.
