= Aaron Walker (soccer) =

American soccer player (born 1990)

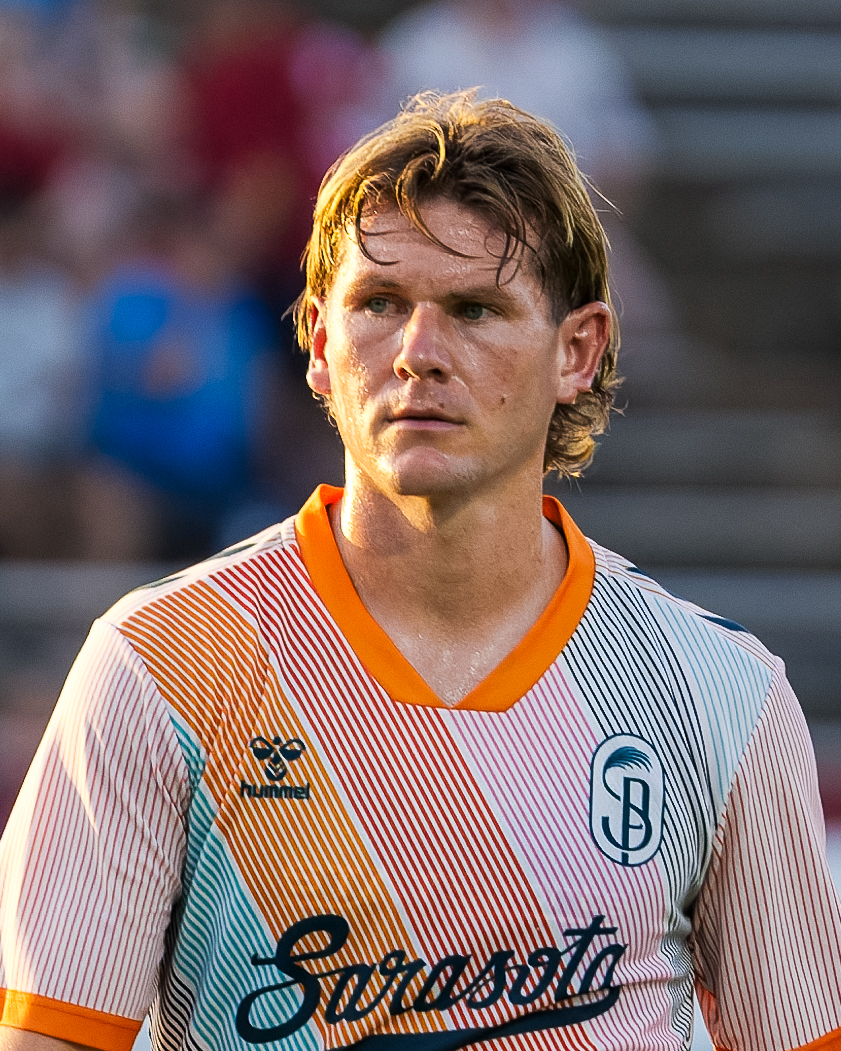
- Walker with Sarasota Paradise in 2026

Personal information
- Date of birth: June 4, 1990 (age 36)
- Place of birth: Woodstock, Georgia, United States
- Height: 1.80 m (5 ft 11 in)
- Position: Midfielder

College career
| Years | Team | Apps | (Gls) |
| 2008–2011 | Oglethorpe Stormy Petrels | | |

Senior career*
| Years | Team | Apps | (Gls) |
| 2012–2013 | Georgia Revolution | | (4) |
| 2013–2016 | BÍ/Bolungarvík | 22 | (1) |
| 2017 | FC Cincinnati | 0 | (0) |
| 2018 | Atlanta Silverbacks | 11 | (4) |
| 2019–2023 | Greenville Triumph | 121 | (15) |
| 2024–2025 | South Georgia Tormenta | 39 | (3) |
| 2026 | Sarasota Paradise | 29 | (2) |

Managerial career
- 2025: South Georgia Tormenta (assistant)
- * Club domestic league appearances and goals as of November 2, 2026

Aaron Walker (born June 4, 1990) is an American soccer player who plays as a midfielder most recently for Sarasota Paradise in USL League One.

== Youth and college ==
Aaron Walker was born on June 4, 1990, in Woodstock, Georgia. He played youth soccer in the North Atlanta Soccer Association in Marietta, Georgia, and attended Etowah High School.

In 2008, he matriculated to Oglethorpe University in nearby Brookhaven, Georgia. He started for the men's soccer team, the Stormy Petrels in NCAA Division III, for all four of his years at the school. In 2011, his senior year, the Stormy Petrels advanced to their first-ever Southern Collegiate Athletic Conference championship, and Walker was named to the All-SCAC First Team. Walker graduated from Oglethorpe in 2012.

== Career ==
After college, Walker played for Georgia Revolution in the National Premier Soccer League in 2012 and 2013.

From 2013 to 2016, he played for BI/Bolungarvik in 1. deild karla, the second-tier professional league in Iceland.

On January 6, 2017, United Soccer League side FC Cincinnati announced that they had signed Walker for their 2017 season. In a quote on the club's website, head coach John Harkes said, "We were impressed by Aaron during the Open Tryout last month and we feel are pleased that we have a player coming from our tryout for the second straight year. We think he will be a good fit." However, John Harkes was fired by the club on February 17, 2017, and Walker ultimately saw no playing time in competitive matches during the 2017 season. On October 25, the club announced they had not exercised their option to keep Walker for the 2018 season.

In 2018, Walker returned to his native Georgia to play for amateur club Atlanta Silverbacks FC in the National Premier Soccer League. He served as captain for the 2018 season and notched six goals and four assists.

In February 2019, Walker, as well as his former FC Cincinnati teammate Dallas Jaye, signed with Greenville Triumph SC in the third-tier professional league USL League One. The two were reunited with their former coach John Harkes, who was serving as the head coach and sporting director for Greenville Triumph. Walker re-signed with Greenville on January 11, 2022.

Walker joined USL League One side South Georgia Tormenta on July 26, 2024. Walker moved into a player-coach role for Tormenta ahead of the 2025 season.

However, on 10 February 2026, he would join USL League One expansion club, Sarasota Paradise.
