= Dallas Jaye =

Soccer player (born 1993)

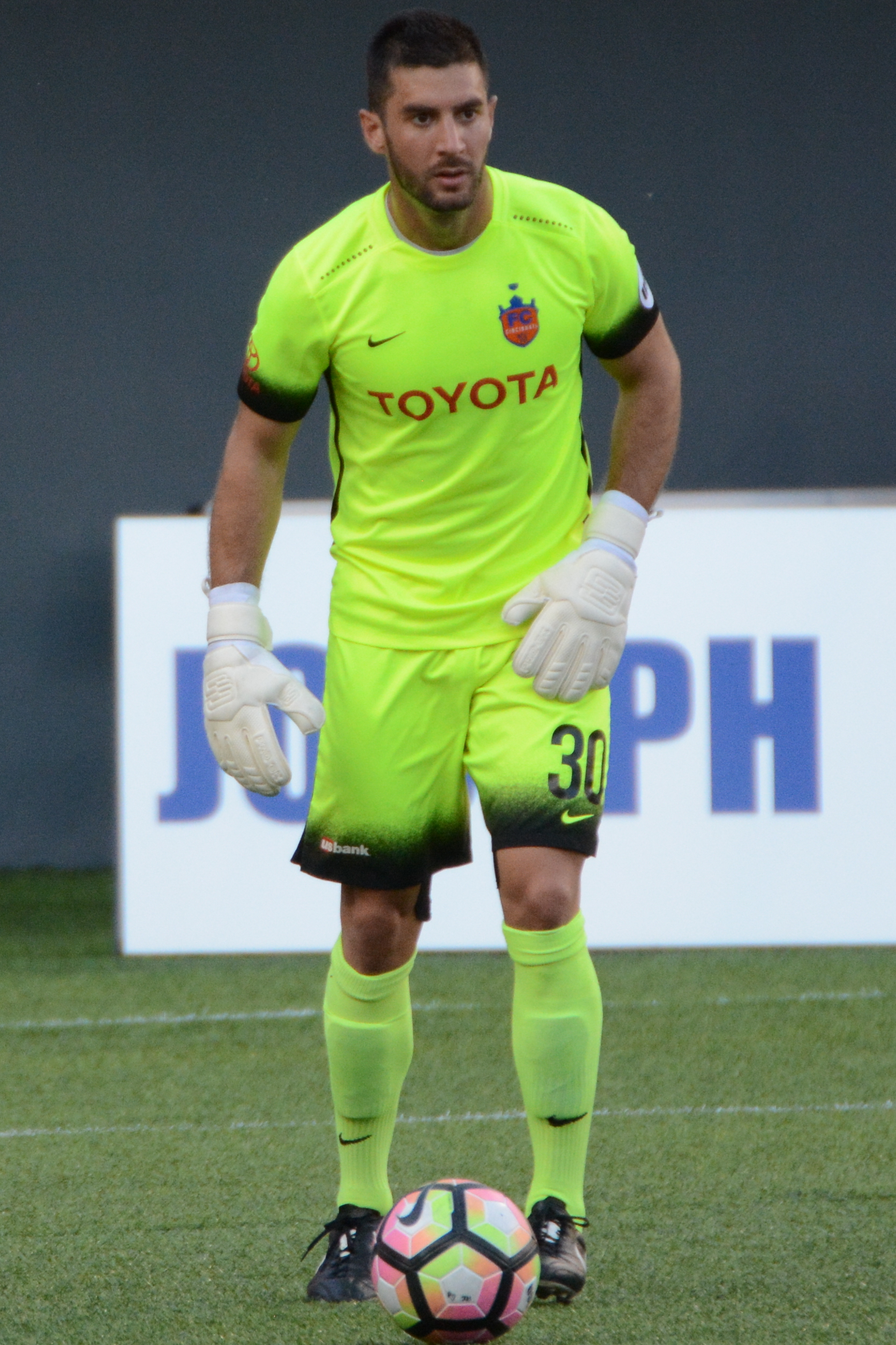
- Jaye with FC Cincinnati in 2017

Personal information
- Full name: Dallas Jeffrey Jaye
- Date of birth: June 19, 1993 (age 33)
- Place of birth: Danville, California, United States
- Height: 6 ft 0 in (1.83 m)
- Position: Goalkeeper

Youth career
- IMG Academy
- De Anza Force

College career
Years	Team	Apps	(Gls)
2011–2014	South Florida Bulls	12	(0)
2015	Xavier Musketeers	14	(0)

Senior career*
Years	Team	Apps	(Gls)
2013–2015	FC Tucson	13	(0)
2016–2017	FC Cincinnati	3	(0)
2018	Phoenix Rising	0	(0)
2019–2021	Greenville Triumph	63	(0)
2022	Monterey Bay	9	(0)

International career
2012–2023	Guam	24	(0)

Managerial career
- 2022: Saint Mary's Gaels (assistant)
- * Club domestic league appearances and goals

Dallas Jeffrey Jaye (born June 19, 1993) is a soccer coach and former professional player who played as a goalkeeper. Born in the United States, he represented Guam internationally.

== Club career ==
=== College soccer ===
Born in Danville, California, Jaye signed a letter of intent to play college soccer for the South Florida Bulls. He also played college soccer for the Xavier Musketeers.

=== Early professional career ===
Jaye played for FC Tucson between 2013 and 2015. He signed with United Soccer League club FC Cincinnati, spending the 2016 and 2017 seasons with them. In October 2017, the club announced they would not exercise their option to have Jaye return in the 2018 season. He spent the 2018 season with Phoenix Rising.

=== Greenville Triumph ===
On February 5, 2019, Jaye joined USL League One side Greenville Triumph ahead of their inaugural season. At the conclusion of the 2019 season, he was named the league's inaugural Goalkeeper of the Year and Golden Glove winner. The 2020 season saw Greenville finish the 2020 regular season in first place and won the League One Championship for the first time. Jaye repeated as Goalkeeper of the Year and Golden Glove winner at the conclusion of the season. During the 2021 League One season, his final season with Greenville, he helped lead the team to another League One Championship final which they ultimately lost to Union Omaha.

=== Monterey Bay ===
On January 19, 2022, Jaye joined USL Championship expansion side Monterey Bay, the second player announced for their roster ahead of their inaugural season. On April 2, 2022, he made his debut for Monterey Bay, during a 2–1 defeat against Sacramento Republic FC. On May 21, 2022, he earned his first shutout for Monterey Bay, during a 2–0 victory over Louisville City FC. Dallas's retirement was announced by Monterey Bay FC on July 18, 2022, with effect from July 23, after which he would join the coaching staff at Saint Mary's College of California. Jaye played his final professional game on July 23, 2022, coming on as a substitute during a 2–0 win over New York Red Bulls II.

== International career ==
Jaye made his international debut for Guam in 2012. By 2022 he had made a total of 22 appearances for the national team. In 2023 he made a further 2 appearances bringing his total number appearances for the national team to 24.

== Coaching career ==
Jaye joined the coaching staff for the Saint Mary's Gaels men's soccer team for the 2022 season.

== Honors ==
Greenville Triumph

- USL League One Championship: 2020

Individual

- USL League One Golden Glove: 2020, 2021
- USL League One Goalkeeper of the Year: 2020, 2021
