= Evan Lee (soccer) =

American soccer player (born 1993)

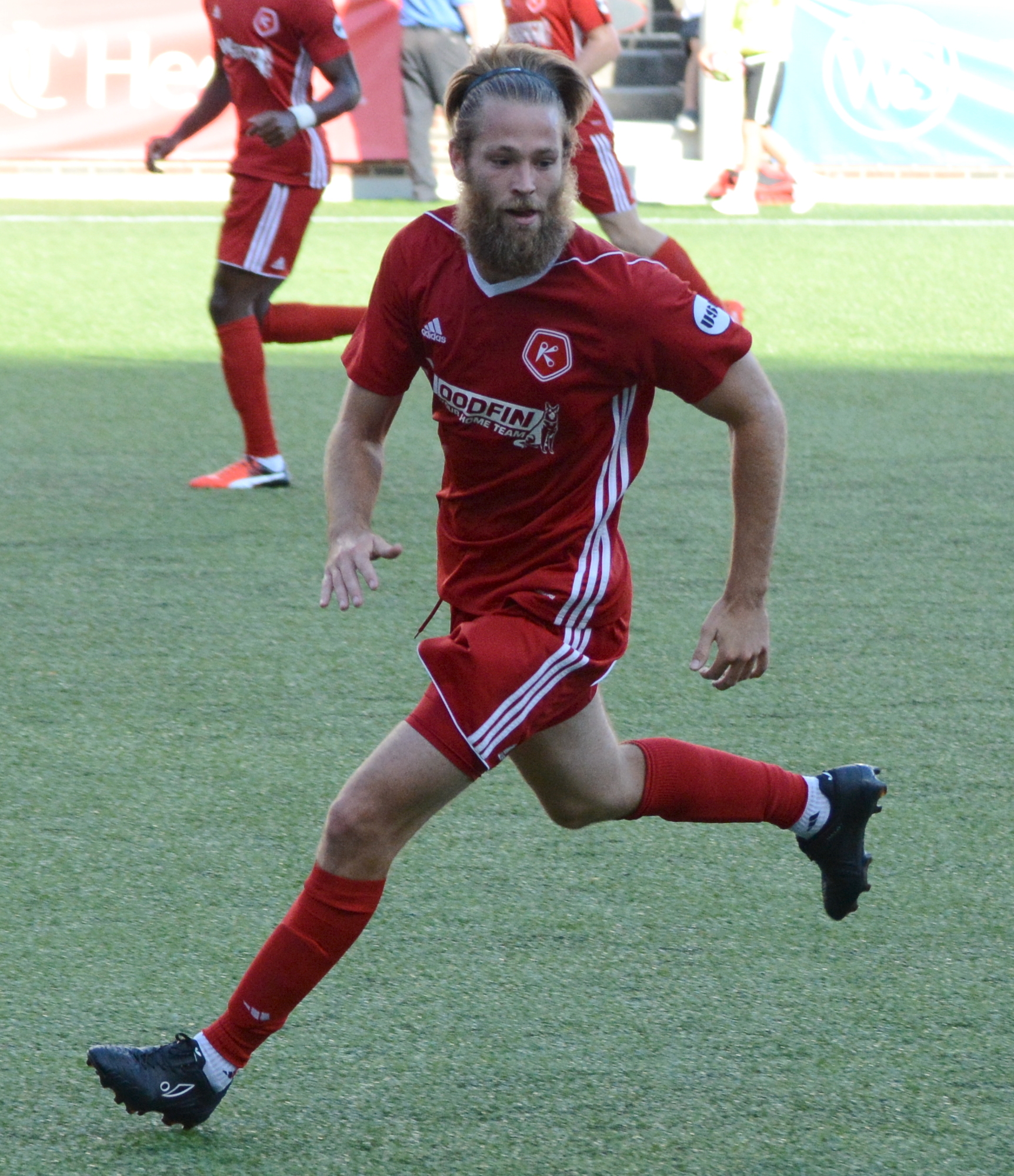
- Lee with Richmond Kickers in 2017

Personal information
- Date of birth: November 23, 1993 (age 32)
- Place of birth: Toledo, Ohio, United States
- Height: 1.94 m (6 ft 4 in)
- Positions: Defender; defensive midfielder

Team information
- Current team: Greenville Triumph
- Number: 12

College career
Years	Team	Apps	(Gls)
2012–2015	Ohio Wesleyan Battling Bishops	80	(13)

Senior career*
Years	Team	Apps	(Gls)
2016	FC Cincinnati	13	(0)
2017–2018	Richmond Kickers	18	(0)
2019–	Greenville Triumph	200	(4)
- * Club domestic league appearances and goals as of October 31, 2026

Evan Lee (born November 23, 1993) is an American professional soccer player who plays for Greenville Triumph in the USL League One.

== Career ==
=== Early career ===
Lee played four years of college soccer at Ohio Wesleyan University between 2012 and 2015.

=== Professional ===
Lee was signed by new United Soccer League club FC Cincinnati on February 15, 2016.

Lee played with USL side Richmond Kickers in 2017 and 2018.

On January 15, 2019, Lee joined USL League One side Greenville Triumph ahead of their inaugural season.
