= Alex Morrell =

American soccer player (born 1994)

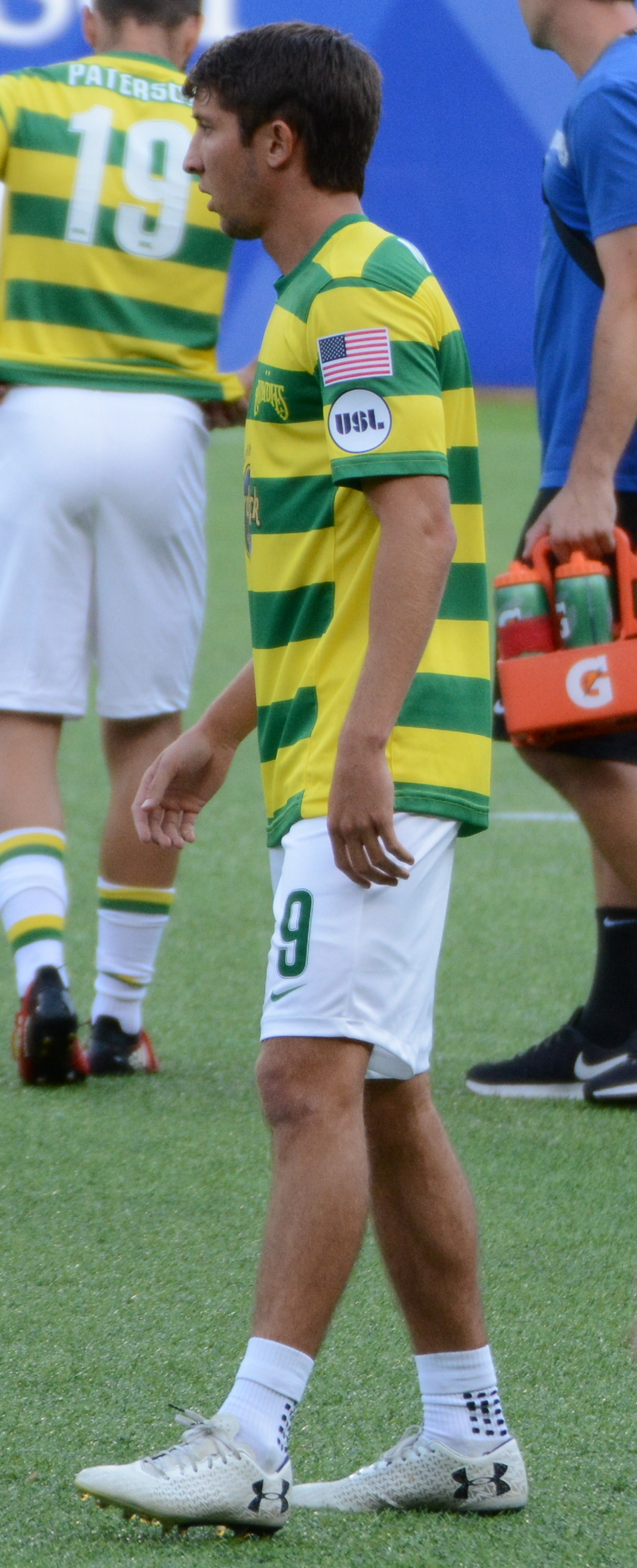
- Morrell playing for the Tampa Bay Rowdies in 2017

Personal information
- Full name: Robert Alexander Morrell
- Date of birth: May 11, 1994 (age 32)
- Place of birth: Lakeland, Florida, United States
- Height: 1.70 m (5 ft 7 in)
- Position: Winger

College career
Years	Team	Apps	(Gls)
2012–2015	North Florida Ospreys	63	(10)

Senior career*
Years	Team	Apps	(Gls)
2013–2014	VSI Tampa Bay	14	(3)
2016	Chicago Fire	4	(0)
2016	→ Saint Louis FC (loan)	2	(0)
2017–2018	Tampa Bay Rowdies	33	(2)
2019	South Georgia Tormenta	27	(4)
2020–2021	Greenville Triumph	37	(5)
2022	South Georgia Tormenta	25	(0)
- * Club domestic league appearances and goals as of October 16, 2022

Robert Alexander Morrell (born May 11, 1994) is an American soccer player who plays as a winger.

== Career ==
Morell spent four years playing in the collegiate ranks for the North Florida Ospreys, while also playing for VSI Tampa Bay and Orlando City B in the Premier Development League, and amateur development league for college players. After graduating college, Morrell was drafted as the 22nd overall pick in the 2016 MLS SuperDraft by Chicago Fire. He signed with the club on March 11, 2016. During the 2016 season, Morrell made four appearances with the Fire before being loaned for the remainder of the season to Saint Louis FC. Morrell made two appearances for Saint Louis. After Fire did not extend his 2017 contract option, Morrell signed with Tampa Bay Rowdies on December 29, 2016. In his first season with the Rowdies Morrell played in 23 matches and scored 2 goals. In 2018, Morrell made a further 11 appearances with the Rowdies, but the team declined to resign him.

Morrell joined Tormenta FC ahead of the inaugural USL League One season.

In January 2020, Morrell signed with Greenville Triumph SC.

== Career statistics ==
As of August 29, 2020

Appearances and goals by club, season and competition
Club	Season	League			National cup		Continental		Playoffs		Total	
Club	Season	Division	Apps	Goals	Apps	Goals	Apps	Goals	Apps	Goals	Apps	Goals
Chicago Fire	2016	MLS	4	0	0	0	0	0	0	0	4	0
Saint Louis FC (Loan)	2016	USL	1	0	0	0	0	0	0	0	1	0
Tampa Bay Rowdies	2017	USL	22	2	1	1	0	0	1	0	24	3
Tampa Bay Rowdies	2018	USL	11	0	0	0	0	0	0	0	11	0
Tampa Bay Rowdies	Total		33	2	1	1	0	0	1	0	35	3
Tormenta FC	2019	USL League One	27	4	0	0	0	0	0	0	27	4
Greenville Triumph SC	2020	USL League One	8	1	0	0	0	0	0	0	8	1
Career total			73	7	1	1	0	0	1	0	75	8
