= Ian Antley =

American soccer player (born 1995)

Personal information
- Date of birth: March 22, 1995 (age 31)
- Place of birth: Atlanta, Georgia, United States
- Height: 6 ft 1 in (1.85 m)
- Position: Defender

Youth career
- Coweta Cannons
- Peachtree City Lazers
- Concorde Fire

College career
Years	Team	Apps	(Gls)
2013–2016	Mercer Bears	56	(3)

Senior career*
Years	Team	Apps	(Gls)
2017	Seattle Sounders FC U-23	1	(0)
2018	Birmingham Hammers	5	(0)
2020–2021	Richmond Kickers	10	(0)
2022	South Georgia Tormenta	0	(0)
2022	Tampa Bay Rowdies	1	(0)
- * Club domestic league appearances and goals as of October 19, 2022

Ian Antley (born March 22, 1995) is an American soccer player who plays as a defender.

== Career ==
Antley began his youth career with the Coweta Cannons, where he played with his brother, until their father moved them to the Peachtree City Lazers following a bad loss to the club. They later played for Concorde Fire in Atlanta before starring at East Coweta High School, where Ian led the soccer team in scoring as a senior.

=== College ===
Antley attended Mercer University between 2013 and 2016, making 53 appearances for the Bears, scoring three goals and tallying eight assists.

=== USL PDL ===
Following college, Antley spent time in the USL PDL with both Seattle Sounders FC U-23's and Birmingham Hammers. He then left the sport to pursue a career in sales.

=== Richmond Kickers ===
On January 17, 2020, he joined USL League One side Richmond Kickers, returning to the sport after watching his brother begin his pro career. In the first game of the 2021 season, he suffered ACL and meniscus tears.

=== South Georgia Tormenta ===
On February 4, 2022, Antley signed with USL League One club South Georgia Tormenta.

=== Tampa Bay Rowdies ===
On July 15, 2022, Antley signed a 25-day contract with the Tampa Bay Rowdies in USL Championship, joining his brother Conner. He was then signed for the remainder of the season. Antley was released by Tampa following their 2022 season.

== Coaching career ==
Antley served as a graduate assistant at Mercer in 2017, during his brother's redshirt senior season.

== Personal ==
Ian's twin brother is fellow professional soccer player Conner Antley.
