= Tiago Mendonca =

Portuguese footballer

Personal information
- Date of birth: 8 October 1995 (age 31)
- Place of birth: Faro, Portugal
- Height: 1.85 m (6 ft 1 in)
- Position: Midfielder

Youth career
- 2005–2015: Farense

College career
Years	Team	Apps	(Gls)
2015–2019	Providence Friars	69	(11)

Senior career*
Years	Team	Apps	(Gls)
2020–2021	New England Revolution II	16	(1)
- * Club domestic league appearances and goals as of 29 October 2021

Tiago Mendonca (born 8 October 1995) is a Portuguese footballer who plays as a midfielder.

== Career ==
=== New England Revolution II ===
In January 2020, Mendonca signed with New England Revolution II of USL League One. He made his competitive debut for the club on 25 July 2020 against Union Omaha.

Mendonca was not announced as a returning player for the club's 2022 season where they'd be competing in the newly formed MLS Next Pro.
