= Eagle Field (Georgia Southern) =

Stadium in Statesboro, Georgia

Bo Pitts Field
- Interactive map of Bo Pitts Field
- Full name: Bo Pitts Field at Erk Russell Athletic Park
- Former names: Eagle Field (2005–2024)
- Address: 1226 Malecki Dr; Statesboro, GA; United States
- Coordinates: 32°24′45″N 81°47′13″W
- Owner: Georgia Southern University
- Operator: Georgia South. Univ. Athletics
- Capacity: 500
- Record attendance: 3,519 (March 29, 2019 Tormenta FC vs. Greenville Triumph SC)
- Current use: Soccer; Track and field

Construction
- Opened: 2005; 21 years ago
- Renovated: 2012

Tenants
- Georgia Southern Eagles (NCAA) teams: men's and women's soccer (2005–present); Tormenta FC (USL1) (2015–2022)

Website
- gseagles.com/eagle-field

Bo Pitts Field at Erk Russell Athletic Park (formerly, Eagle Field) is a 500+ seat on campus soccer/track and field stadium in Statesboro, Georgia, United States. It is home to the Georgia Southern Eagles men's and women's soccer teams as well as cross country and track and field events. It is located in Erk Russell Athletic Park which is shared with American football venue Allen E. Paulson Stadium as well as other football buildings.

The stadium was completed in 2005. On October 10, 2012, the first ever night soccer game was played at Eagle Field with newly installed lights with Georgia Southern playing Elon.

The stadium hosted the 2018 Sun Belt Conference Men's Soccer Tournament. The stadium has also served as the host institution for the Southern Conference Outdoor Track & Field Championships three times, most recently in 2013.

USL League One team Tormenta FC play at Eagle Field. In 2021, the team plans to move to a 5,300 seater soccer-specific stadium in Statesboro, which is currently under construction.

In 2024, the stadium was named after Charles "Bo" Pitts, a notable soccer player for Georgia.
