= Joe Erwin =

American businessman

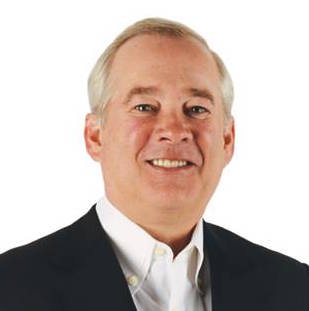

Chair of the South Carolina Democratic Party
- In office 2003 – May 2007

Personal details
- Born: Joe Arnold Erwin; October 23, 1956 (age 69) Florence, South Carolina, U.S.
- Party: Democratic
- Spouse: Gretchen Getchell Erwin (m. 1984)
- Children: 2
- Parent(s): Henry Erwin; Isabel Erwin Kelly
- Education: Eastside High School; Clemson University (BA)
- Profession: Politician, entrepreneur

Joe Arnold Erwin (born October 23, 1956) is an entrepreneur and politician from South Carolina. He co-founded and former president of Erwin-Penland Advertising, is a former chairman of the South Carolina Democratic Party, and co-founded the thought leadership conference Food for Thought in 2008. Currently owns Erwin Creates and the co-working space in Downtown Greenville South Carolina, Endeavor Greenville (www.endeavorgreenville.com).

== Early years ==
Erwin was born October 23, 1956, in Florence, South Carolina, to Isabel Erwin Kelly and Henry Erwin. Henry died following a brief illness when Joe was 12, and his mother raised Joe and his younger brother Tony. After living in North Carolina and Florida, the Erwins moved to Greenville, South Carolina, in 1968 to be closer to family.

Erwin attended public schools and graduated from Eastside High School in Greenville in 1975. At Eastside, he served as student body president, the editorial page editor of the school's newspaper, and captained the undefeated varsity soccer team. Following graduation, Erwin enrolled at Clemson University. He was an Intramural Debate champion, an International Debate representative, a varsity cheerleader, and in his senior year, the head cheerleader (also known as the "Mic Man"). He was named an NCAA All-American in 1978. Erwin graduated from Clemson in 1979 with a B.A. in Political Science.

Joe married Gretchen Getchell Erwin in 1984, and they have two children: Douglas (b. 1988) and Valerie (b. 1990). They live in Greenville, South Carolina and are members of Christ Church Episcopal.

== Marketing executive ==
Following graduation, Erwin worked at Leslie Advertising in Greenville, initially in the media department and later as an account executive. In 1982 he was recruited to New York to join national agency Benton & Bowles (later DMB&B) to work on the Corning Glass and Quincy's Family Steakhouse accounts. In addition to account executive duties, Erwin began to write copy–ultimately serving as copywriter for John Madden's broadcast campaign for Quincy's. After their marriage in 1984, Gretchen moved to New York and joined the Media Department at Dancer Fitzgerald Sample (later Saatchi & Saatchi).

While in New York, Joe, Gretchen and their friend Allen Bosworth began to talk of returning south to open an agency of their own. Joe and Gretchen purchased Penland Advertising in Greenville, South Carolina, in 1986, renaming the new agency Erwin-Penland. Allen Bosworth remained in New York for two years before joining EP as Director of Client Service in 1988. Joe served as President and Creative Director, while Gretchen led the Media Department.

Since opening in 1986 with one account and one employee, Erwin-Penland has seen expansion. Now with more than 200 employees working across all marketing disciplines, clients include Verizon Wireless, Denny's, Confluence Watersports, Fatz Cafe, ScanSource, Lockheed Martin and BI-LO Supermarkets. Erwin-Penland is a member of the American Association of Advertising Agencies (AAAA's), and the Intermarket Agency Network.

Erwin-Penland is known for "integrated marketing solutions"–primarily for retail accounts.

== Political activity ==
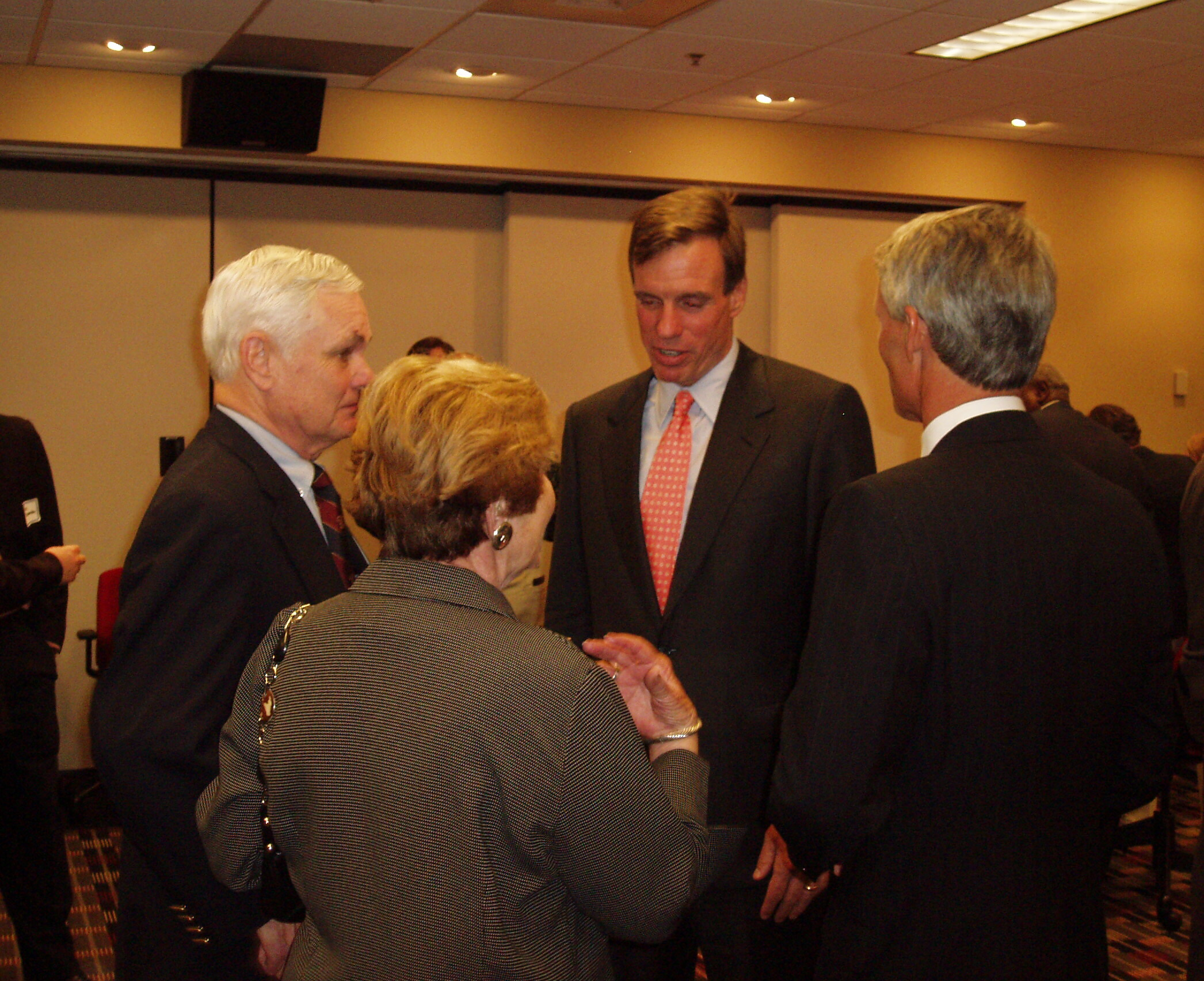
Erwin (left) speaking with Mark Warner (second from right) and others at a 2006 political event in South Carolina

While at Clemson, Erwin was a member of College Democrats, and volunteered for a number of campaigns, including future South Carolina congressman Jim Clyburn's campaign for secretary of State, Richard W. Riley's campaign for governor, and Jimmy Carter's presidential race. During the 1980s and 1990s, he campaigned for South Carolina governor Jim Hodges, U.S. senator Ernest Hollings, South Carolina superintendent of education Inez Tenenbaum, and statewide candidates Steve Benjamin and Rick Wade.

Erwin was elected chairman of the South Carolina Democratic Party in 2003, and completed his second two-year term in May 2007. During that time, he negotiated and produced two Democratic presidential debates–one in Greenville in 2003 and one in Orangeburg in 2007–that were broadcast live nationally on NBC. The Greenville debate was the last debate moderated by Tom Brokaw before he left the anchor chair at NBC News. Erwin chose to hold the 2007 debate on the campus of South Carolina State University in Orangeburg, marking the first time a presidential primary debate had been held at an historically black college or university.

South Carolina competed against 10 other states and the District of Columbia for the early primary designation, and ultimately was chosen by the DNC to join New Hampshire as the only other state with a pre-window primary. The January 2008 Democratic presidential primary, in which South Carolina Democrats turned out in record numbers and outpolled Republicans by more than 88,000 votes, was a watershed event in the 2008 Democratic presidential nominating process. Senator Barack Obama won the primary with 55% of the vote.

When Erwin's term as chair expired in May 2007, he chose not to seek re-election, but remained involved in politics. In fall 2007, he endorsed Senator Barack Obama for president, and campaigned with and for the senator in the months leading up to the January 2008 primary.

== Community service ==
Erwin is an Ernst & Young Entrepreneur of the Year Award Winner, was inducted into Greenville Tech's Entrepreneurs Forum in 2000 and is a member of the Clemson University Entrepreneurs' Roundtable. He served on the Executive Committee of the Greenville Chamber of Commerce, and was a member of South Carolina Governor Jim Hodges' Commission on Teacher Quality.

In September 2008 Erwin was elected to the national board of the Partnership for a Drug-Free America. He also serves on the boards of the Upstate Alliance and the BI-LO Charity Classic, and served as 2008 upstate campaign co-chair for the United Negro College Fund. He is a graduate of the Diversity Leadership Academy at Furman University.
