= Brandon Fricke =

American soccer player (born 1992)

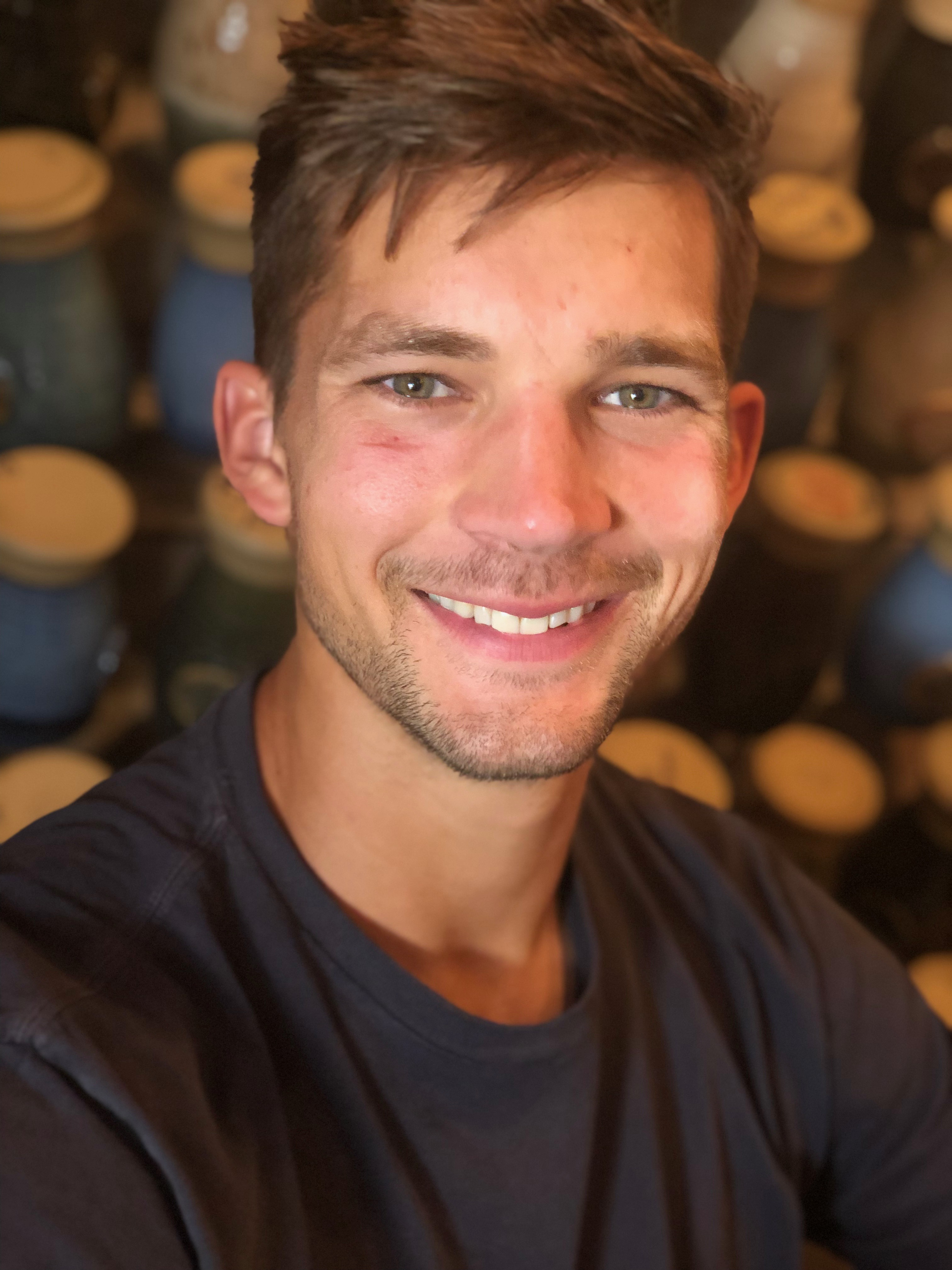

Personal information
- Date of birth: March 22, 1992 (age 34)
- Place of birth: Grimes, Iowa, United States
- Height: 6 ft 1 in (1.85 m)
- Position: Defender

Team information
- Current team: Greenville Triumph
- Number: 5

Youth career
- 2008–2010: Kansas City Wizards

College career
Years	Team	Apps	(Gls)
2011–2014	Butler Bulldogs	71	(6)

Senior career*
Years	Team	Apps	(Gls)
2010–2014	Des Moines Menace	48	(4)
2015	Charlotte Independence	1	(0)
2016	Nybro IF	23	(1)
2017	Des Moines Menace	10	(0)
2017	Nybro IF	9	(0)
2018	Des Moines Menace	12	(2)
2019	Lansing Ignite	27	(2)
2020–	Greenville Triumph	174	(8)
- * Club domestic league appearances and goals as of October 31, 2026

Brandon Fricke (born March 22, 1992) is an American soccer player who plays for Greenville Triumph SC in USL League One. He is the 2020 USL League One defender of the year.

== Career ==
=== College and amateur ===
Born in Grimes, Iowa, Fricke played fours years of college soccer at Butler University between 2011 and 2014, also including a red-shirted year in 2010.

While at college, Fricke also appeared for USL PDL club Des Moines Menace from 2010 to 2014.

=== Professional ===
On January 20, 2015, Fricke was drafted 83rd overall in the 2015 MLS SuperDraft by Colorado Rapids. Fricke was not signed by Colorado, but joined their United Soccer League affiliate side Charlotte Independence on February 18, 2015.

Fricke played the 2016 and 2017 seasons in Sweden, with two more stints with the Menace.

Fricke joined Lansing Ignite on January 24, 2019, ahead of the inaugural USL League One season.

Lansing Ignite folded following the 2019 season, leading Fricke to sign with Greenville Triumph of USL League One.
