= Noah Pilato =

American soccer player (born 1996)

Personal information
- Date of birth: June 25, 1996 (age 30)
- Place of birth: Oak Hill, Virginia, U.S.
- Height: 1.78 m (5 ft 10 in)
- Position: Midfielder

Youth career
- 2010–2013: D.C. United
- 2013–2014: Oakton High School

College career
Years	Team	Apps	(Gls)
2015–2018	Penn State Nittany Lions	49	(1)

Senior career*
Years	Team	Apps	(Gls)
2016	Evergreen FC	0	(0)
2017	South Florida Surf	8	(1)
2019	Loudoun United	13	(1)
2020–2023	Greenville Triumph	63	(6)
2024	Charlotte Independence	7	(0)
- * Club domestic league appearances and goals as of November 20, 2024

Noah Pilato (born June 25, 1996) is an American soccer player who plays as a midfielder.

== Early life ==
Pilato was born on June 25, 1996, in Oak Hill, Virginia. He attended Oakton High School in Vienna, Virginia.

=== Amateur ===
After playing for D.C. United Academy and Oakton High School, Pilato played college soccer at Penn State.

=== Professional ===
Pilato signed with his local team, Loudoun United FC on March 7, 2019. He scored his first professional goal on May 11, 2019, against the Charlotte Independence.

For the 2020 season, Pilato joined Greenville Triumph SC of USL League One. He scored a goal in a preseason win by the Triumph against USL Championship side North Carolina FC on February 29, 2020. Pilato scored his first professional goal for the Triumph on August 22, 2020, in a 1–0 win against Fort Lauderdale CF.

On April 11, 2024, Pilato signed with USL League One side Charlotte Independence.
