= Legacy Early College Field =

Stadium in Greenville, South Carolina

- Interactive map of Legacy Early College Field
- Location: Greenville, South Carolina
- Coordinates: 34°51′33″N 82°25′31″W
- Operator: Legacy Early College
- Capacity: 4,000

Tenant
- Greenville Triumph SC (USL League One) (2019–2022)

Legacy Early College Field is a 4,000-seat stadium located on the campus of Legacy Early College, a college preparatory school, in Greenville, South Carolina. The stadium is best known for being the home field for Greenville Triumph SC, a professional soccer club that plays in USL League One, the third tier of soccer in the United States. It was previously the football stadium for the former Parker High School, whose building Legacy Early College occupies today.
