= Curtis Thorn =

English footballer

Personal information
- Date of birth: 2 September 1995 (age 31)
- Place of birth: Bordon, England
- Height: 6 ft 1 in (1.85 m)
- Position: Defender

Team information
- Current team: Miami FC
- Number: 23

Youth career
- 2007–2009: Fulham
- 2013–2015: Havant & Waterlooville

College career
Years	Team	Apps	(Gls)
2018–2019	Nova Southeastern Sharks	33	(4)

Senior career*
Years	Team	Apps	(Gls)
2016–2017	Alton	19	(8)
2017–2018	Team Solent	59	(3)
2018	New Orleans Jesters	9	(0)
2019	Tormenta FC 2	13	(0)
2020–2022	South Georgia Tormenta	43	(2)
2023–	Miami FC	17	(0)
- * Club domestic league appearances and goals as of October 19, 2023

Curtis Thorn (born 2 September 1995) is an English professional footballer who plays as a defender for The Miami FC in USL Championship.

== Career ==
=== Youth, college and amateur ===
Thorn was part of the Fulham academy for three years. He later went on to play for Wessex League sides Alton and Team Solent.

Thorn moved to the United States in 2018, and played two years of college soccer at Nova Southeastern University between 2018 and 2019, making a total of 33 appearances, scoring four goals and tallying assists. He was named to the Fall SSC Commissioner's Honor Roll in both seasons with the Sharks, received All-South Region honors from the D2CCA and United Soccer Coaches and was the team MVP in 2019.

While at college, Thorn appeared for NPSL side New Orleans Jesters in 2018, where he was named MVP. In 2019 he played for USL League Two side South Georgia Tormenta FC 2 helping them to the Deep South Division title and the clubs first Southern Conference title.

=== Professional ===
On 27 August 2020, Thorn signed with USL League One side South Georgia Tormenta. He made his professional debut on 11 September 2020, starting in a 2–2 draw with Union Omaha.

On 23 December 2022, Thorn signed a multi-year contract with USL Championship side Miami FC.
