= Jordan Skelton =

English footballer (born 1997)

Personal information
- Date of birth: 22 February 1997 (age 29)
- Place of birth: Newcastle upon Tyne, England
- Height: 6 ft 4 in (1.93 m)
- Position: Defender

Team information
- Current team: One Knoxville
- Number: 4

Youth career
- Gateshead College

College career
Years	Team	Apps	(Gls)
2015–2018	Lander Bearcats	75	(17)

Senior career*
Years	Team	Apps	(Gls)
2017–2018	Mississippi Brilla	27	(4)
2019	South Georgia Tormenta 2	4	(0)
2019–2020	South Georgia Tormenta	23	(0)
2021	Des Moines Menace	12	(0)
2022	North Carolina FC	29	(0)
2023–	One Knoxville	104	(3)
- * Club domestic league appearances and goals as of 23:00, 1 November 2026 (UTC)

Jordan Skelton (born 22 February 1997) is an English footballer who plays as a defender for One Knoxville SC in USL League One.

== Career ==
=== College and amateur ===
Skelton played four years of college soccer at Lander University between 2015 and 2018.

While at college, Skelton appeared for USL PDL side Mississippi Brilla in both 2017 and 2018. Following college, Skelton appeared for PDL, now rebranded as USL League Two, side South Georgia Tormenta 2.

=== Professional ===
On 9 August 2019, Skelton signed with USL League One side South Georgia Tormenta.

After co-captaining Des Moines Menace to the 2021 USL League Two title, Skelton signed with USL League One club North Carolina FC on December 16, 2021.

On January 12, 2023, Skelton transferred to League One expansion club One Knoxville SC. The move reunites him with coach Mark McKeever, under whom he had won the 2021 USL League Two championship with Des Moines Menace.
