= Mark Hernández =

American soccer player (born 1996)

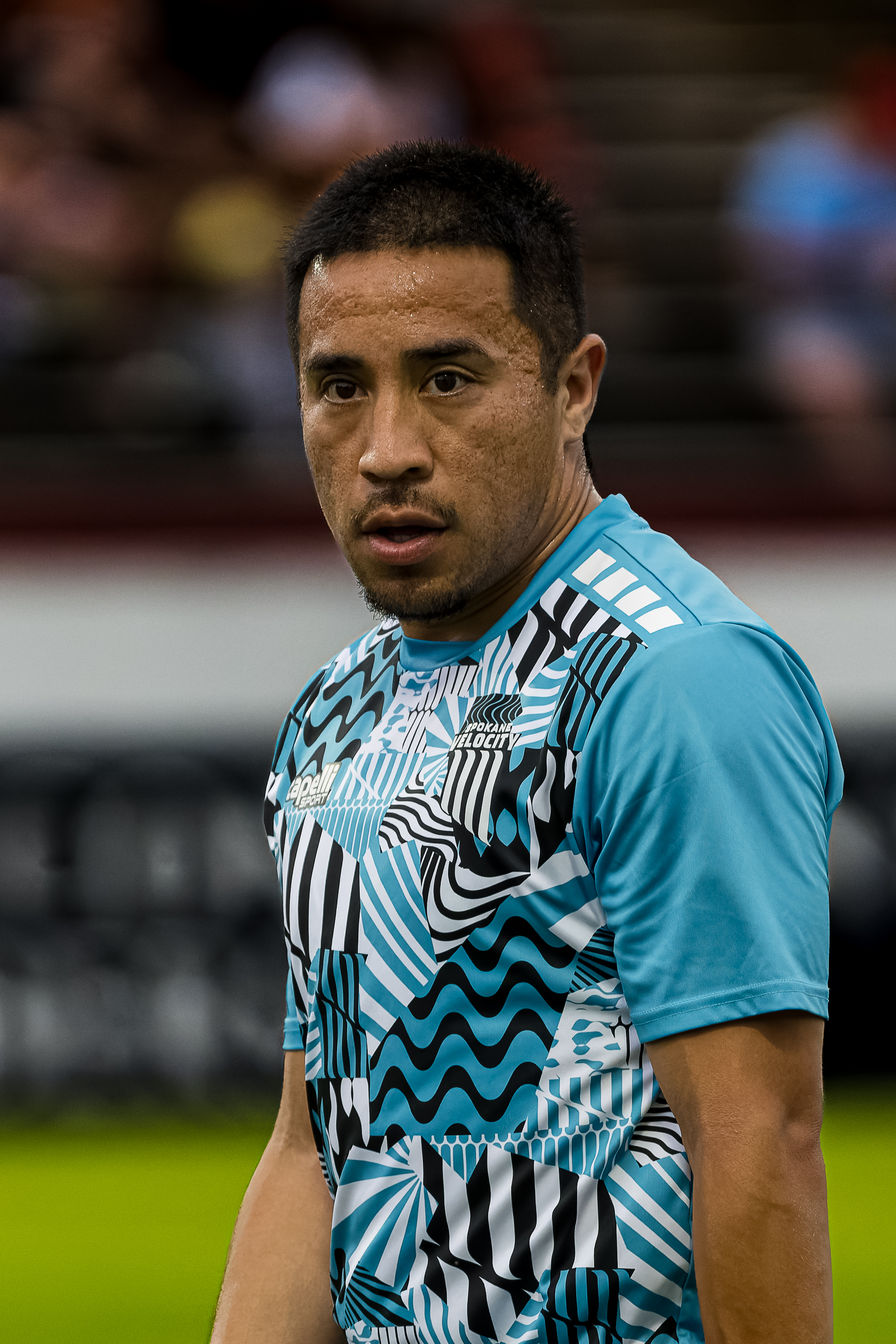
- Hernandez with Spokane Velocity in 2026

Personal information
- Date of birth: August 7, 1996 (age 30)
- Place of birth: Anaheim, California, U.S.
- Height: 1.65 m (5 ft 5 in)
- Position: Winger

Team information
- Current team: Spokane Velocity
- Number: 14

Youth career
- Chivas USA

College career
Years	Team	Apps	(Gls)
2015–2017	Golden West Rustlers	17	(9)
2017–2019	Cal State Fullerton Titans	40	(4)

Senior career*
Years	Team	Apps	(Gls)
2017	Orange County SC U-23	6	(0)
2018	FC Golden State Force	0	(0)
2019	Reno 1868	0	(0)
2020–2021	Chattanooga Red Wolves	35	(9)
2022–2024	Northern Colorado Hailstorm	69	(12)
2025–	Spokane Velocity	21	(2)
- * Club domestic league appearances and goals as of November 1, 2026

Mark "Marky" Hernández (born August 7, 1996) is an American soccer player who plays as a midfielder for Spokane Velocity in USL League One.

== Career ==
=== Chattanooga Red Wolves ===
Prior to the 2020 season, Hernández moved to USL League One club Chattanooga Red Wolves SC. He made his league debut for the club on 25 July 2020, playing the entirety of a 2–2 away draw with Tormenta FC.

On January 11, 2022, Hernández signed with League One expansion club Northern Colorado Hailstorm FC.

On February 14, 2025, Hernández joined USL League One side Spokane Velocity.
