= Greenville Triumph SC =

Greenville Triumph
- Full name: Greenville Triumph Soccer Club
- Founded: March 13, 2018; 8 years ago
- Stadium: GE Vernova Park; Mauldin, South Carolina
- Capacity: 6,300
- Owners: Joe Erwin; William M. Webster; Ronaldinho
- President: Zach Prince
- Head coach: Dave Dixon
- League: USL League One
- 2025: USL League One, 11th of 14
- Website: greenvilletriumph.com
Home colors	Away colors

Greenville Triumph SC is a professional soccer team based in Greenville, South Carolina, United States. The club began play in USL League One in 2019.

== History ==
The formation of USL D3 was first announced in April 2017, and league officials began touring the country, looking for candidate cities for new soccer clubs. USL D3 vice president Steven Short visited Greenville in July 2017 and told local reporters at the time that Greenville was one of the league's top candidates. In January 2018, the league began announcing teams that would play in their 2019 inaugural season. The formation of a USL D3 club in Greenville was officially announced on March 13, 2018, with local entrepreneur Joe Erwin named the principal owner. The Greenville team was the third team to join the league after Tormenta FC and FC Tucson, two clubs which already existed and played in the Premier Development League. The team qualified for the playoffs in their first year of existence.

The team's name, Greenville Triumph SC, and its logo and colors were announced on August 9, 2018. On August 27, the team announced that the team would be coached by former U.S. national team player John Harkes, who had previously served as head coach of USL club FC Cincinnati for the 2016 season. Harkes was signed on a three-year contract.

On June 8, 2021, GTSC announced they will field a women's side to compete in the new USL W League beginning in 2022.

On January 28, 2022, GTSC officials announced that after a two-year search for a new stadium location, they had settled on a six-acre site in Mauldin, South Carolina at BridgeWay Station. The proposed stadium would contain 8,100 seats and be multi-sport. Had county officials approved the stadium, the project would have been completed by the beginning of the 2023 season. The Greenville County Council finance committee rejected that original proposal.

On October 30, 2024, after a two-year delay, the team announced that plans for a 10,000-seat stadium (expanded from the prior 8,100-seat plan) in Mauldin at BridgeWay Station would move forward. The multi-use venue will be home to both the Triumph and the Greenville Liberty. It is expected to be completed in 2026 with an estimated cost of $80–$100 million.

On September 23, 2025, the team put up an article on their official team website with an update (after more than a year since the last announcement) that highlighted that "(T)he multi-use stadium within BridgeWay Station in Mauldin will host its first matches in 2026." and that they would receive money, in different amounts, from the city of Mauldin, the state of South Carolina, and Greenville Pro Soccer, "along with millions of donated land and in-kind planning, development, and coordination contributions from Hughes Investments, developer of BridgeWay Station." One important thing of note was that, compared to the 10,000 figure initially put out, the stadium would only have up to 6,300 people, "creating a more intimate experience for the fans", and that lastly, "the design will mirror BridgeWay Station’s distinctive European-inspired architecture, featuring grand columns, ornamental cornices, Italian-inspired towers, and expansive archways that will serve as grand entrances into the stadium and complement the development’s walkable, community-centered design."

On June 3, 2026, the club played their first game at their new stadium, GE Vernova Park. The Triumph defeated Forward Madison 1-0 in front of a sold-out 4,300 capacity crowd.

== Sponsorship ==
Season	Kit manufacturer	Shirt sponsor
2019–2020	Nike	ScanSource
2021–2024	Hummel	ScanSource
2025–present	Hummel	Prisma Health

== Club culture ==
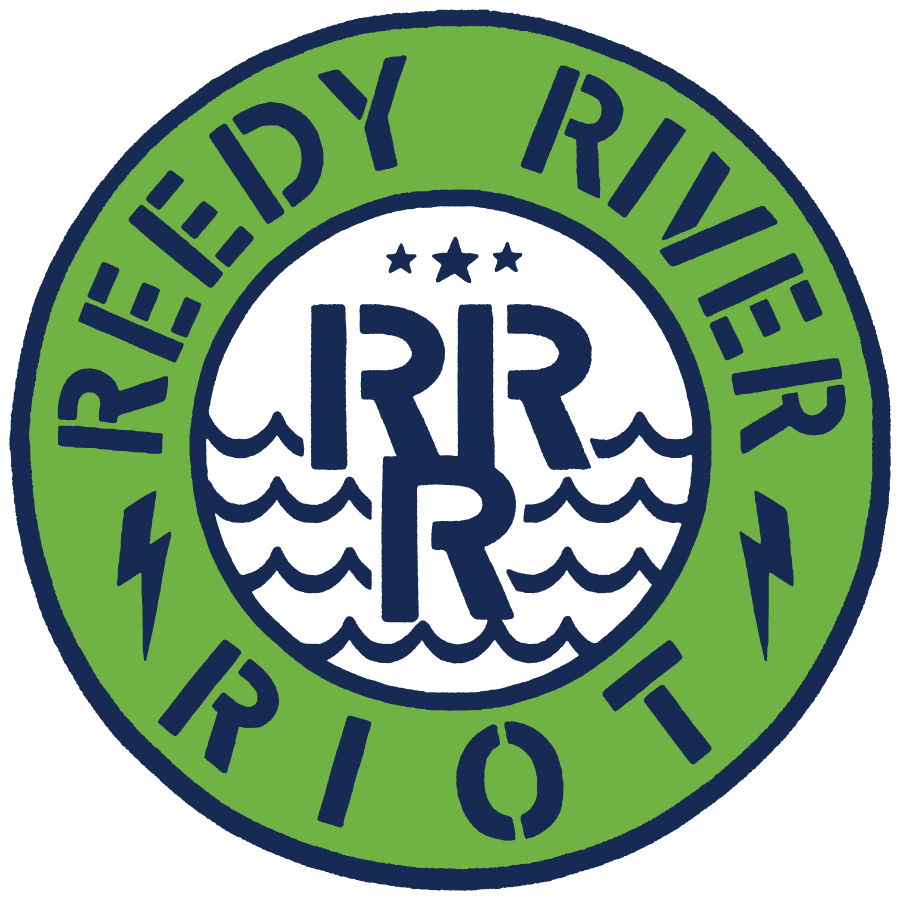
The 3 stars represent the tri-city area of Anderson, Greenville, and Spartanburg. Along with the Reedy River that flows through the Upstate of SC

The Greenville Triumph's supporters group, The Reedy River Riot, began in earnest when members of their leadership began discussing strategies to create a professional soccer team in Greenville. A social media blitz of #usl2gvl and a Change.org petition in June 2017 began this process. The petition to “Bring Professional Soccer to Greenville” garnered over 900 signatures and caught the eye of the USL leadership and the local prospective ownership group. Their dream was fulfilled in March 2018 with the announcement that Greenville had been chosen as a founding member of the USL D3.

Throughout the team's conception and buildout, the Reedy River Riot's initial membership began meeting to discuss their vision for a supporters group. Their leadership consists of soccer fanatics based in and around Greenville who have served together in leadership positions within numerous soccer supporter groups in the past. They wave flags and say chants.

== Players and staff ==
=== Current roster ===
As of March 14, 2026

Note: Flags indicate national team as defined under FIFA eligibility rules; some limited exceptions apply. Players may hold more than one non-FIFA nationality.

No.	Pos.	Nation	Player
3	DF	USA	Tyler Polak
4	DF	ENG	Toby Sims
5	DF	USA	Brandon Fricke
6	DF	ENG	Ivan Agyaakwah
7	MF	USA	Devin Boyce
8	MF	USA	Chapa Herrera
9	FW	ESP	Rodrigo Robles
10	FW	SSD	William Akio
11	MF	USA	Jason Bouregy
12	MF	USA	Evan Lee
13	GK	JAM	Amal Knight
14	DF	USA	Daniel Wu
15	DF	BRA	Anthony Patti

No.	Pos.	Nation	Player
15	FW	USA	Brigham Larsen
18	DF	USA	Connor Evans
19	FW	USA	Azaad Liadi
22	DF	JPN	Kimito Fritz
23	MF	USA	Ezra White
25	FW	COL	Leo Castro
27	FW	SOM	Muba Nour
30	GK	USA	Seth Torman
31	FW	JAM	Deshane Beckford
33	FW	USA	Lucas Meek
42	DF	USA	Zane Bubb
77	DF	USA	DJ Benton

1. USL Academy Contract

=== Staff ===
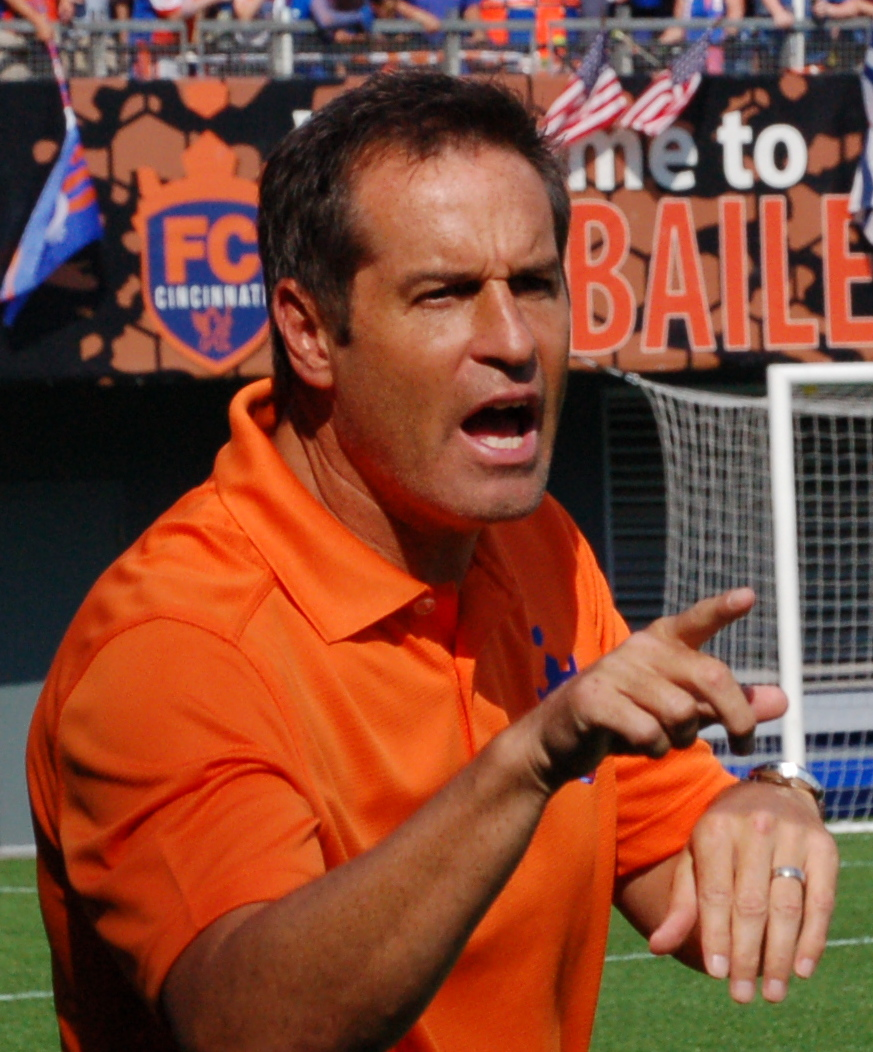
John Harkes was Greenville's first head coach.

Executive
Majority owner	Joe Erwin
Chairman	Wallace Cheves
Vice chairman	Doug Erwin
President	Zach Prince
Coaching staff
Head coach	Dave Dixon
Assistant coach	Joel Tyson
Assistant coach	Jey Bhindi
Goalkeeping coach	Juan “Choco” Villegas
High performance coach	Ryan McKie

== Record ==
=== Year-by-year ===
Season	USL League One									Playoffs	US Open Cup	Top Scorer ^{1}	
Season	P	W	L	D	GF	GA	Pts	PPG	Pos.	Playoffs	US Open Cup	Player	Goals
2019	28	12	7	9	32	22	43	1.54	3rd	Finals	2nd Round	(United States) Jake Keegan	9
2020	16	11	3	2	24	11	35	2.19	1st	Champions	Cancelled	(Australia) Lachlan McLean	7
2021	28	12	9	7	36	29	45	1.61	2nd	Finals	Cancelled	(Netherlands) Marios Lomis	15
2022	30	12	8	10	40	38	46	1.53	2nd	Semifinals	3rd Round	(United States) Jacob Labovitz	12
2023	32	13	10	9	45	40	48	1.50	5th	Quarterfinals	2nd Round	(Colombia) Leonardo Castro	13
2024	22	11	7	4	39	28	37	1.68	4th	Semifinals	3rd Round	(Switzerland) Lyam MacKinnon	18 ♦
2025	30	8	14	8	38	43	32	1.06	11th	Did not qualify	2nd Round	(Colombia) Leonardo Castro	7
Total	164	68	51	45	215	183	249	1.52	-				

1. Top goalscorer(s) includes all goals scored in league, league playoffs, U.S. Open Cup and other competitive matches.

== Honors ==
- USL League One
  - Champions: 2020 (Note: Championship game canceled due to COVID-19. Greenville won on Points Per Game average.)
- USL League One Regular Season
  - Winners: 2020

=== Player honors ===
Year	Player	Country	Position	Honor
2019	Dallas Jaye	Guam	Goalkeeper	Goalkeeper of the Year Golden Glove All-League First Team
2019	Tyler Polak	United States	Defender	All-League First Team
2019	Cole Seiler	United States	Defender	All-League First Team
2020	Dallas Jaye	Guam	Goalkeeper	Goalkeeper of the Year Golden Glove All-League First Team
2020	Brandon Fricke	United States	Defender	Defender of the Year All-League First Team
2020	Tyler Polak	United States	Defender	All-League First Team
2020	Noah Pilato	United States	Midfielder	All-League First Team
2020	Alex Morrell	United States	Forward	All-League First Team
2020	Lachlan McLean	Australia	Forward	All-League Second Team
2021	Marios Lomis	Netherlands	Forward	All-League First Team
2021	Brandon Fricke	United States	Defender	All-League Second Team
2021	Abdi Mohamed	Somalia	Defender	All-League Second Team
2021	Aaron Walker	United States	Midfielder	All-League Second Team
2022	Evan Lee	United States	Defender	All-League First Team
2022	Brandon Fricke	United States	Defender	All-League Second Team
2023	Leonardo Castro	(Colombia) Columbia	Forward	All-League Second Team
2024	Lyam MacKinnon	Switzerland	Forward	Player of the Year Golden Boot All-League First Team
2024	Evan Lee	United States	Midfielder	All-League Second Team

== See also ==
- Greenville Liberty SC
