= 2020 Chattanooga Red Wolves SC season =

Chattanooga Red Wolves SC
2020 season
- Owner: Robert Martino
- Head coach: Tim Hankinson
- Stadium: CHI Memorial Stadium
- USL League One: 5th
- USL1 Playoffs: Did not qualify
- U.S. Open Cup: Cancelled
- Biggest win: CHA 4–0 NE (Aug. 29)
- Biggest defeat: CHA 1–3 NTX (Oct. 7)
Home colors	Away colors

The 2020 Chattanooga Red Wolves SC season was the second season in the soccer team's history, where they compete in the third division of American soccer, USL League One, the second season of that competition. Chattanooga Red Wolves SC will also participate in the 2020 U.S. Open Cup. Chattanooga Red Wolves SC played their home games at CHI Memorial Stadium in East Ridge, Tennessee, United States, moving from their previous stadium, David Stanton Field. Matches were played under reduced capacity due to the ongoing COVID-19 pandemic and stadium construction.

== Club ==
=== Roster ===
As of February 25, 2020.

No.	Pos.	Nat.	Name
5	DF	(United States)	Leo Folla
7	MF	(Brazil)	Ualefi
8	MF	(United States)	Josue Soto
10	FW	(Republic of Ireland)	Steven Beattie
12	FW	(Libya)	Éamon Zayed
13	DF	(Ghana)	Nicholas Amponsah
14	MF	(United States)	Amirgy Pineda
17	FW	(Scotland)	Greg Hurst
21	FW	(United States)	Alexi Jaimes
22	FW	(United States)	Conor Doyle
24	GK	(United States)	Alex Mangels
	MF	(United States)	Mark Hernández
	DF	(Guam)	Travis Nicklaw
	DF	(Greece)	Nikolaos Pettas
	FW	(United States)	Ronaldo Pineda
	DF	(United States)	Jason Ramos
	MF	(United States)	Jonathan Ricketts
	MF	(United States)	Ricardo Ruiz
	GK	(United States)	Tim Trilk
	DF	(Nigeria)	Uchenna Uzo
	FW	(United States)	Ricardo Zacarías

=== Coaching staff ===
Name	Position
(United States) Jimmy Obleda	Head coach and technical director

== Competitions ==
=== Exhibitions ===
February 16, 2020 Preseason 1	Atlanta United 2	0–4	Chattanooga Red Wolves SC	Marietta, Georgia
1:00 PM EDT		Report	Pineda, Zacarías; Zayed	Stadium: Atlanta United Training Facility
Note: Three thirty-minute periods

February 25, 2020 Preseason 2	Charleston Battery	4–1	Chattanooga Red Wolves SC	Mount Pleasant, South Carolina
10:00 AM EDT	Piggott 14'; Clarke 42'; Bosua 70', 78'	Report	23' (pen.) <	Stadium: Patriots Point Soccer Complex; Attendance: 0
Note: Closed door scrimmage

February 29, 2020 Preseason 3	Chattanooga Red Wolves SC	0–0	Young Harris Mountain Lions
1:00 PM EDT		Report		Attendance: 0
Note: Closed door scrimmage

March 6, 2020 Preseason 4	Chattanooga Red Wolves SC	3–1	Dalton State Roadrunners
10:00 AM EDT	Ruiz; Zacarías 73' (Zayed), 80' (pen.)	Report	60'	Attendance: 0
Note: Closed door scrimmage

=== USL League One ===
==== Standings ====
Pos	Team	Pld	W	L	D	GF	GA	GD	Pts	PPG
3	North Texas SC (Note: Professional teams that are owned by teams playing in a higher division are ineligible for the U.S. Open Cup.)	16	7	3	6	27	19	+8	27	1.69
4	Richmond Kickers	16	8	6	2	22	22	0	26	1.63
5	Chattanooga Red Wolves SC	15	6	5	4	21	17	+4	22	1.47
6	FC Tucson	16	6	6	4	21	19	+2	22	1.38
7	Forward Madison FC	16	5	5	6	20	14	+6	21	1.31

Source: 2020 USL League One standings
Rules for classification: 1) points; 2) total wins; 3) total goal differential; 4) total goals scored; 5) points earned against top four Conference finishers; 6) disciplinary points; 7) coin toss or drawing of lots

==== Results summary ====
Overall								Home						Away					
Pld	W	D	L	GF	GA	GD	Pts	W	D	L	GF	GA	GD	W	D	L	GF	GA	GD
5	1	2	2	6	7	−1	5	1	0	1	2	2	0	0	2	1	4	5	−1

Source: USL League One

==== Results by round ====
Round	1	2	3	4	5	6	7	8	9	10	11	12	13	14	15	16
Stadium	A	H	A	H	A	H	H	A	A	H	H	A	H	A	H	A
Result	D	W	D	P	L	L										
Position	4	2	4		6											

Source: USL League One
A = Away; H = Home; W = Win; D = Draw; L = Loss

==== Match results ====
July 25, 2020 1	South Georgia Tormenta FC	2–2	Chattanooga Red Wolves SC	Statesboro, Georgia
8:00 PM EDT	Micaletto 7', (yellow card) 26'; Mayr-Fälten (yellow card) 16'; Rowe (yellow card) 71'; Jackson 90+1'	Report	Hurst (yellow card) 28', (goal) 52', 61'; Ruiz (yellow card) 42'; A. Pineda (yellow card) 82'; Ualefi (yellow card) 83'; Hernández (yellow card) 90+3'	Stadium: Eagle Field at Erk Russell Athletic Park; Referee: Sergii Demianchuk

August 1, 2020 2	Chattanooga Red Wolves SC	1–0	FC Tucson	East Ridge, Tennessee
5:00 PM EDT	Soto (yellow card) 5'; Folla (yellow card) 15'; Doyle (yellow card) 38'; Zacarías (yellow card) 41'; Hurst 53'; Mangels (yellow card) 68'; R. Pineda (yellow card) 84'	Report	Liadi (yellow card) 22'; Magaña-Rivera (yellow card) 42'; Somersall (yellow card) 59'; Biek (yellow card) 61'; Coan (penalty missed) 69'; Alarcón (yellow card) 89'	Stadium: CHI Memorial Stadium; Attendance: 721; Referee: Kyle Johnston

August 8, 2020 3	North Texas SC	2–2	Chattanooga Red Wolves SC	Frisco, Texas
9:00 PM EDT	Redzic 47', 87'; Rayo (yellow card) 68' (yellow-red card) 90+3'	Report	Hurst 3'; R. Pineda (yellow card) 76'; Hernández 88', (yellow card) 90+5'	Stadium: Toyota Stadium; Attendance: 1,137; Referee: Héctor Hernández

August 12, 2020 4	Chattanooga Red Wolves SC	P–P	Union Omaha	East Ridge, Tennessee
5:00 PM EDT				Stadium: CHI Memorial Stadium
Note: Match postponed due to severe weather.

August 15, 2020 5	Greenville Triumph SC	1–0	Chattanooga Red Wolves SC	Greenville, South Carolina
7:00 PM EDT	Fricke (yellow card) 43'; Hawkins (yellow card) 45'; Morrell (yellow card) 52'; McLean 71'; Donnelly (yellow card) 76'	Report	Uzo (yellow card) 90+3'	Stadium: Legacy Early College Field; Attendance: 883; Referee: Kevin Broadley

August 22, 2020 6	Chattanooga Red Wolves SC	1–2	South Georgia Tormenta FC	East Ridge, Tennessee
1:00 PM EDT	Hurst 26'; Folla (yellow card) 39'; Ramos (yellow card) 84'	Report	Vinyals (yellow card) 17'; Micaletto (yellow card) 36', (goal) 79' (pen.); Phelps (yellow card) 41'; Mayr-Fälten 82'; DeLoach (red card) 90+1'; Jara (yellow card) 90+6'	Stadium: CHI Memorial Stadium; Attendance: 770; Referee: Richonne Clark

August 29, 2020 7	Chattanooga Red Wolves SC	4–0	New England Revolution II	East Ridge, Tennessee
1:00 PM EDT	Zacarías 12', (yellow card) 90+2'; Hernández 29', 38'; Folla (yellow card) 57'; Beattie 88'	Report		Stadium: CHI Memorial Stadium; Attendance: 700; Referee: Joshua Belk

September 5, 2020 8	Fort Lauderdale CF	1–1	Chattanooga Red Wolves SC	Fort Lauderdale, Florida
8:00 PM EDT	Zacarías 26' (o.g.)	Report	Ualefi 42'; Soto (yellow card) 86'	Stadium: Inter Miami CF Stadium; Referee: Alejo Calume

September 9, 2020 9	New England Revolution II	1–2	Chattanooga Red Wolves SC	Foxborough, Massachusetts
7:00 PM EDT	Sinclair 45+1'; Presley (yellow card) 90+2'	Report	Ramos 10'; Ricketts (yellow card) 45'; Souza 83' (o.g.); R. Pineda (yellow card) 89'	Stadium: Gillette Stadium; Referee: Joshua Encarnación

September 12, 2020 10	Chattanooga Red Wolves SC	2–1	Richmond Kickers	East Ridge, Tennessee
1:00 PM EDT	R. Pineda (yellow card) 43'; Dieterich 54'; Soto (yellow card) 58'; Okonkwo (yellow card) 75'; Beattie 90+2', (yellow card) 90+2'	Report	Terzaghi 13'; Pavone (yellow card) 58'; Diosa (yellow card) 90+4'	Stadium: CHI Memorial Stadium; Attendance: 744; Referee: Izlen Peksenar

September 15, 2020 4	Chattanooga Red Wolves SC	2–0	Union Omaha	East Ridge, Tennessee
12:00 PM EDT	Zacarías 18'; Ramos (yellow card) 51'; Dieterich 62'; Ruiz (yellow card) 90+4'	Report	David (yellow card) 22'; Mare (yellow card) 90+4'	Stadium: CHI Memorial Stadium; Attendance: 150; Referee: Kyle Johnston
Note: Re-schedule of postponed August 12 match.

September 19, 2020 11	Chattanooga Red Wolves SC	0–1	Greenville Triumph SC	East Ridge, Tennessee
1:00 PM EDT	Mangels (yellow card) 21'; Ramos (yellow card) 26'; Soto (yellow card) 51'; Hernández (yellow card) 70'	Report	Murillo (yellow card) 36'; McLean (yellow card) 45'; Pilato 84'; Stripling (yellow card) 90'	Stadium: CHI Memorial Stadium; Attendance: 1,000; Referee: Amin Hadzic

September 26, 2020 12	Forward Madison FC	1–0	Chattanooga Red Wolves SC	Wauwatosa, Wisconsin
2:00 PM EDT	Ovalle (yellow card) 23'; Vang 50'; Smart (yellow card) 63'; Toyama (yellow card) 64'; Fernandes (yellow card) 90+1'; Cox (yellow card) 90+6'	Report	Hurst (yellow card) 39'; Ramos (yellow card) 66'; R. Pineda (yellow card) 85'	Stadium: Hart Park; Referee: Rebeca Pagan

October 7, 2020 13	Chattanooga Red Wolves SC	1–3	North Texas SC	East Ridge, Tennessee
5:00 PM EDT	Hurst 22' (pen.); Nicklaw (yellow card) 57'; Doyle (yellow card) 74'	Report	Munjoma (yellow card) 13'; A. Rodríguez 26'; Burgess 48'; Bruce 57' (pen.)	Stadium: CHI Memorial Stadium; Referee: Sergii Demianchuk

October 10, 2020 14	Orlando City B	P–P	Chattanooga Red Wolves SC	Kissimmee, Florida
3:00 PM EDT				Stadium: Osceola County Stadium
Note: Postponed due to two positive COVID-19 tests in the Chattanooga organization.

October 17, 2020 15	Chattanooga Red Wolves SC	1–1	Forward Madison FC	East Ridge, Tennessee
5:00 PM EDT	Hurst 8' (pen.), (yellow card) 90+2'; Soto (yellow card) 19'; Ruiz (yellow card) 73'	Report	Vang 69'; Ovalle (yellow card) 70'	Stadium: CHI Memorial Stadium; Referee: Sergii Demianchuk

October 24, 2020 16	Richmond Kickers	1–2	Chattanooga Red Wolves SC	Richmond, Virginia
6:30 PM EDT	Ackwei (yellow card) 25'; Anderson 64'; Boehme (yellow card) 90+1'	Report	Hurst 57'; Hernández (yellow card) 86', (goal) 90+3'; R. Pineda (yellow card) 90+1'	Stadium: City Stadium; Referee: Danielle Chesky

=== U.S. Open Cup ===
As a USL League One club, Chattanooga will enter the competition in the Second Round, to be played April 7–9.

April 7, 2020 2nd round	Chattanooga Red Wolves SC (Tennessee)	P–P	(Alabama) Birmingham Legion FC	Chattanooga, Tennessee
7:00 PM EDT				Stadium: David Stanton Field
Note: Match postponed due to the COVID-19 pandemic
