= 2021 USL League One season =

USL League One
- Season: 2021
- Dates: April 10 – October 30 (regular season); November 6–20 (playoffs)
- Champions: Union Omaha (1st Title)
- Regular season title: Union Omaha (1st Title)
- Matches: 172
- Goals: 456 (2.65 per match)
- Best player: (Argentina) Emiliano Terzaghi Richmond Kickers
- Top goalscorer: (Argentina) Emiliano Terzaghi Richmond Kickers (18 goals)
- Best goalkeeper: (Japan) Akira Fitzgerald Richmond Kickers
- Biggest home win: GVL 4–0 NTX (May 1); FTL 5–1 TUC (May 16); NCA 4–0 RIC (July 21); NTX 4–0 NCA (August 14)
- Biggest away win: TRM 0–4 OMA (October 1)
- Highest scoring: FTL 4–4 TRM (October 10)
- Longest winning run: 5 matches RIC
- Longest unbeaten run: 15 matches CHA
- Longest winless run: 8 matches GVL
- Longest losing run: 4 matches MAD; GVL; NCA; TRM; TUC
- All statistics correct as of October 30, 2021 (regular season only).

The 2021 USL League One season was the third season of USL League One. The regular season began on April 10 and ended on October 30, 2021. The playoffs was held from November 6 to 20, 2021.

North Carolina FC joined the league for this season, after leaving the USL Championship in what the team called a "strategic move" to enhance its youth development pathway.

Greenville Triumph SC were the defending champions on both regular season and playoffs. Union Omaha took both titles to won their first League One regular season and championship titles.

== Teams ==
Locations of teams for the 2021 USL League One season

Club	City	Stadium	Capacity	Head coach	MLS associate	Jersey manufacturer	Jersey sponsor
Chattanooga Red Wolves SC	Chattanooga, Tennessee	CHI Memorial Stadium	5,000	Jimmy Obleda		Adidas	Transcard
Fort Lauderdale CF	Fort Lauderdale, Florida	DRV PNK Stadium	19,000	Darren Powell	Inter Miami CF	Adidas	
Forward Madison FC	Madison, Wisconsin	Breese Stevens Field	5,000	Carl Craig	Chicago Fire FC	Hummel	Dairyland Insurance
Greenville Triumph SC	Greenville, South Carolina	Legacy Early College Field	4,000	John Harkes		Hummel	Scansource
New England Revolution II	Foxborough, Massachusetts	Gillette Stadium	20,000	Clint Peay	New England Revolution	Adidas	UnitedHealthcare
North Carolina FC	Cary, North Carolina	Sahlen's Stadium at WakeMed Soccer Park	10,000	John Bradford		Adidas	WakeMed
North Texas SC	Arlington, Texas	Choctaw Stadium	48,114	Eric Quill	FC Dallas	Adidas	AdvoCare
Richmond Kickers	Richmond, Virginia	City Stadium	22,611	Darren Sawatzky		Adidas	Ukrop's
South Georgia Tormenta FC	Statesboro, Georgia	Eagle Field at Erk Russell Park	3,500	Ian Cameron		Adidas	Optim Healthcare
Toronto FC II	Toronto, Ontario	Grande Sports World; Osceola County Stadium; BMO Training Ground	Various	Mike Muñoz	Toronto FC	Adidas	BMO
FC Tucson	Tucson, Arizona	Kino Sports Complex	3,500	Jon Pearlman		Puma	
Union Omaha	Papillion, Nebraska	Werner Park	9,023	Jay Mims		Nike	XCancer

MLS-affiliated
MLS-owned
1. Played at various stadiums in the United States due to COVID-19 travel restrictions in Canada.

=== Managerial changes ===
Team	Outgoing manager	Manner of departure	Date of vacancy	Incoming manager	Date of appointment
Forward Madison FC	(United States) Daryl Shore	Mutual separation	October 27, 2020	(England) Carl Craig	December 1, 2020
Fort Lauderdale CF	(United States) Jason Kreis	Mutual separation	March 16, 2021	(England) Darren Powell	March 16, 2021
FC Tucson	(United States) John Galas	Mutual separation	June 30, 2021	(United States) Jon Pearlman (Note: Pearlman was initially appointed as interim head coach, but the move was made permanent on October 7, 2021.)	June 30, 2021

== League table ==
Pos	Team	Pld	W	D	L	GF	GA	GD	Pts	Qualification
1	Union Omaha (C, X)	28	14	9	5	44	22	+22	51	Qualification for the semi-finals
2	Greenville Triumph SC	28	12	9	7	36	29	+7	45	Qualification for the semi-finals
3	Chattanooga Red Wolves SC	28	11	11	6	37	29	+8	44	Qualification for the play-offs
4	FC Tucson	28	11	7	10	44	42	+2	40	Qualification for the play-offs
5	Richmond Kickers	28	11	7	10	35	36	−1	40	Qualification for the play-offs
6	North Texas SC	28	10	10	8	40	32	+8	40	Qualification for the play-offs
7	Toronto FC II	28	10	8	10	34	32	+2	38	
8	New England Revolution II	28	11	4	13	33	39	−6	37	
9	Forward Madison FC	28	8	12	8	32	34	−2	36	
10	Fort Lauderdale CF	28	8	7	13	40	49	−9	31	
11	Tormenta FC	28	8	6	14	36	47	−11	30	
12	North Carolina FC	28	7	4	17	30	50	−20	25	

Source: USL League One
Rules for classification: 1) points; 2) total wins; 3) total goal differential; 4) total goals scored; 5) points earned against top four Conference finishers; 6) disciplinary points; 7) drawing of lots.
(C) Champions; (X) Regular Season Champion

== Results table ==
Color key: Home • Away • Win • Loss • Draw
Club	Matches																											
Club	1	2	3	4	5	6	7	8	9	10	11	12	13	14	15	16	17	18	19	20	21	22	23	24	25	26	27	28
Chattanooga Red Wolves (CHA)	NTX	NEW	FTL	RIC	TRM	TUC	NCA	GVL	OMA	TUC	TRM	NTX	GVL	MAD	NCA	NTX	OMA	TOR	FTL	NTX	GVL	NCA	NEW	RIC	NCA	TOR	GVL	MAD
Chattanooga Red Wolves (CHA)	1–0	2–2	2–1	2–1	0–1	3–2	3–2	1–1	1–1	2–2	2–1	1–1	1–1	1–1	4–1	1–1	1–0	0–0	0–0	1–0	0–1	3–1	0–1	0–1	3–2	1–2	0–0	1–2
Fort Lauderdale CF (FTL)	NEW	TRM	NTX	RIC	OMA	TUC	CHA	NEW	MAD	NCA	TOR	TOR	TOR	TUC	RIC	MAD	NCA	GVL	TUC	TRM	CHA	TUC	TRM	GVL	OMA	TRM	NTX	TOR
Fort Lauderdale CF (FTL)	0–1	1–0	2–4	2–1	0–2	5–1	1–2	0–1	2–2	2–1	2–2	1–2	2–1	1–2	1–1	1–1	2–3	2–0	0–4	4–2	0–0	0–3	2–2	0–1	1–4	4–4	0–1	2–1
Forward Madison FC (MAD)	TUC	NCA	OMA	TRM	FTL	OMA	RIC	NEW	GVL	NEW	NTX	OMA	FTL	CHA	TRM	TOR	NTX	NCA	RIC	TOR	GVL	NEW	RIC	NEW	RIC	OMA	TUC	CHA
Forward Madison FC (MAD)	1–1	1–0	1–0	3–1	2–2	1–2	0–0	0–2	2–2	1–0	1–4	1–1	1–1	1–1	2–1	2–2	1–1	0–1	1–0	1–1	1–1	0–1	0–1	0–1	2–3	2–1	2–2	2–1
Greenville Triumph SC (GVL)	RIC	NTX	NCA	OMA	TRM	NTX	NCA	TRM	MAD	CHA	NEW	NCA	TRM	CHA	TOR	TRM	FTL	RIC	TUC	TOR	CHA	TUC	MAD	FTL	OMA	NEW	CHA	NCA
Greenville Triumph SC (GVL)	1–0	4–0	2–1	1–1	1–0	0–3	2–1	1–3	2–2	1–1	3–0	0–0	2–3	1–1	0–0	1–3	0–2	0–2	1–2	3–0	1–0	3–3	1–1	1–0	1–0	1–0	0–0	2–0
New England Revolution II (NEW)	FTL	RIC	OMA	CHA	FTL	RIC	OMA	MAD	NTX	MAD	GVL	TOR	TUC	TOR	NCA	RIC	TRM	TUC	TRM	NCA	RIC	CHA	MAD	TOR	MAD	GVL	NTX	TOR
New England Revolution II (NEW)	1–0	0–3	0–1	2–2	1–0	2–3	2–4	2–0	3–0	0–1	0–3	1–0	2–4	1–0	3–0	2–2	1–1	1–2	1–1	1–4	3–1	1–0	1–0	0–1	1–0	0–1	1–4	0–1
North Carolina FC (NCA)	GVL	MAD	RIC	TUC	FTL	GVL	CHA	RIC	TOR	TRM	TOR	RIC	FTL	NEW	CHA	NTX	MAD	RIC	OMA	NEW	CHA	NTX	TOR	CHA	TUC	OMA	TRM	GVL
North Carolina FC (NCA)	1–2	0–1	0–0	1–2	1–2	1–2	2–3	2–1	0–0	0–0	2–4	4–0	3–2	0–3	1–4	0–4	1–0	0–0	0–3	4–1	1–3	0–1	0–3	2–3	2–0	1–4	1–0	0–2
North Texas SC (NTX)	FTL	GVL	CHA	TRM	TOR	TOR	GVL	TUC	NEW	RIC	MAD	CHA	OMA	TUC	NCA	CHA	MAD	OMA	TUC	CHA	TRM	OMA	NCA	TUC	RIC	FTL	NEW	OMA
North Texas SC (NTX)	4–2	0–4	0–1	2–1	1–2	1–1	3–0	0–0	0–3	2–3	4–1	1–1	1–1	2–0	4–0	1–1	1–1	0–0	1–1	0–1	0–2	2–2	1–0	2–0	1–2	1–0	4–1	1–1
Richmond Kickers (RIC)	NEW	GVL	FTL	TRM	NCA	CHA	NEW	MAD	OMA	NCA	NTX	FTL	NCA	TRM	TUC	TOR	NEW	GVL	NCA	MAD	NEW	TOR	CHA	MAD	NTX	MAD	OMA	TUC
Richmond Kickers (RIC)	3–0	0–1	1–2	2–0	0–0	1–2	3–2	0–0	1–1	1–2	3–2	1–1	0–4	2–2	1–0	1–2	2–2	2–0	0–0	0–1	1–3	1–0	1–0	1–0	2–1	3–2	0–2	2–4
Tormenta FC (TRM)	FTL	OMA	TUC	RIC	NTX	GVL	MAD	CHA	TOR	TOR	GVL	TOR	TOR	NCA	CHA	GVL	RIC	GVL	MAD	NEW	FTL	NEW	NTX	FTL	OMA	FTL	TUC	NCA
Tormenta FC (TRM)	0–1	0–2	3–1	0–2	1–2	0–1	1–3	1–0	1–0	1–0	3–1	1–3	1–2	0–0	1–2	3–2	2–2	3–1	1–2	1–1	2–4	1–1	2–0	2–2	0–4	4–4	1–3	0–1
Toronto FC II (TOR)	NTX	TUC	NTX	OMA	TUC	TRM	TRM	FTL	FTL	TRM	FTL	TRM	NEW	NCA	NEW	GVL	RIC	MAD	CHA	GVL	OMA	MAD	RIC	NCA	NEW	CHA	FTL	NEW
Toronto FC II (TOR)	2–1	1–2	1–1	1–1	1–1	0–1	0–1	2–2	2–1	3–1	1–2	2–1	0–1	4–2	0–1	0–0	2–1	2–2	0–0	0–3	1–2	1–1	0–1	3–0	1–0	2–1	1–2	1–0
FC Tucson (TUC)	TRM	MAD	FTL	TOR	NCA	TOR	CHA	NTX	OMA	FTL	CHA	NEW	OMA	RIC	NTX	OMA	FTL	GVL	NEW	NTX	FTL	GVL	OMA	NTX	NCA	TRM	MAD	RIC
FC Tucson (TUC)	1–3	1–1	1–5	2–1	2–1	1–1	2–3	0–0	0–1	2–1	2–2	4–2	1–2	0–1	0–2	0–1	4–0	2–1	2–1	1–1	3–0	3–3	1–0	0–2	0–2	3–1	2–2	4–2
Union Omaha (OMA)	TRM	FTL	NEW	GVL	MAD	TOR	MAD	NEW	RIC	TUC	CHA	MAD	TUC	NTX	TUC	CHA	NTX	NCA	TOR	NTX	TUC	TRM	FTL	GVL	NCA	MAD	RIC	NTX
Union Omaha (OMA)	2–0	2–0	1–0	1–1	0–1	1–1	2–1	4–2	1–1	1–0	1–1	1–1	2–1	1–1	1–0	0–1	0–0	3–0	2–1	2–2	0–1	4–0	4–1	0–1	4–1	1–2	2–0	1–1

== Playoffs ==
The 2021 USL League One Playoffs (branded as the 2021 USL League One Playoffs presented by TwinSpires for sponsorship reasons) was the post-season championship of the USL League One season.

=== Bracket ===
Quarter-finals
4	FC Tucson	1
5	Richmond Kickers	0
3	Chattanooga Red Wolves SC (a.e.t.)	2
6	North Texas SC	1

Semi-finals
1	Union Omaha	6
4	FC Tucson	1
2	Greenville Triumph SC (a.e.t.)	2
3	Chattanooga Red Wolves SC	0

Final
1	Union Omaha	3
2	Greenville Triumph SC	0

=== Schedule ===
==== Quarter-finals ====
November 6, 2021	Chattanooga Red Wolves SC	2–1 (a.e.t.)	North Texas SC	East Ridge, Tennessee
7:00 PM EDT	Benton 7' (o.g.); Ortiz (yellow card) (yellow-red card) 32'; Carrera-García (yellow card) 43'; Ualefi (yellow card) 78'; Navarro (yellow card) 97'; Ruiz (yellow card) 99'; Galindrez 113' (yellow card) 114'	Report	Lucão (red card) 29'; Munjoma (yellow card) 31'; Kamungo 67'; Rayo (yellow card) 86'; Smith (yellow card) 105+3'	Stadium: CHI Memorial Stadium; Attendance: 2,017; Referee: Joshua Encarnación

November 6, 2021	FC Tucson	1–0	Richmond Kickers	Tucson, Arizona
7:00 PM MST	Kone (yellow card) 51'; Corfe (yellow card) 55' (goal) 87'	Report	Bolanos (yellow card) 45+1'	Stadium: Kino North Stadium; Attendance: 1,793; Referee: Jeremy Scheer

==== Semi-finals ====
November 13, 2021	Union Omaha	6–1	FC Tucson	Papillion, Nebraska
4:00 PM CST	Conway 3', 31'; Viader 49'; Boyce (yellow card) 32' (goal) 54'; Crull (yellow card) 34'; Panchot 70'; Alihodžić 83'	Report	Schenfeld (yellow card) 30' (yellow-red card) 32'; Dennis (yellow card) 44' (goal) 63'; Ferriol (yellow card) 66'	Stadium: Werner Park; Attendance: 3,607; Referee: Michael Radchuk

November 13, 2021	Greenville Triumph SC	2–0 (a.e.t.)	Chattanooga Red Wolves SC	Greenville, South Carolina
7:00 PM EST	Walker (yellow card) 34'; Mohamed (yellow card) 42'; Polak (yellow card) 75'; Ibarra 97'; Lomis 111'	Report	España (yellow card) 41'; Ramos (yellow card) 42'; Villalobos (yellow card) 80'; Carrera-García (yellow card) 88'	Stadium: Legacy Early College Field; Attendance: 2,851; Referee: Adam Kilpatrick

==== Final ====
November 20, 2021	Union Omaha	3–0	Greenville Triumph SC	Papillion, Nebraska
4:00 PM CST	Conway 7' (yellow card) 11' (yellow-red card) 77'; Hurst 43'; Sousa (yellow card) 62'; Viader (yellow card) 63'; Otieno 90+2'	Report	Hemmings (yellow card) 65'; Lee (yellow card) 72'	Stadium: Werner Park; Attendance: 5,221; Referee: Kevin Broadley

Championship Game MVP: (Spain) Damià Viader (Union Omaha)

== Attendance ==
=== Average home attendances ===
Ranked from highest to lowest average attendance.

Team	GP	Total	High	Low	Average
Union Omaha	14	46,013	3,884	2,405	3,287
Forward Madison FC	14*	35,896	3,607	1,529	2,761
Greenville Triumph SC	14	33,373	4,027	1,536	2,384
Richmond Kickers	14	29,094	3,212	1,126	2,078
Chattanooga Red Wolves SC	14	25,512	2,149	1,508	1,822
North Carolina FC	14*	21,286	4,084	996	1,637
Tormenta FC	14	16,869	2,045	635	1,205
FC Tucson	14	13,825	1,556	654	988
North Texas SC	14	11,883	2,212	550	849
New England Revolution II	14*	1,965	500	100	151
Fort Lauderdale CF	14*	0	0	0	0
Toronto FC II	14*	0	0	0	0
Total	168	235,716	4,084	100	1,721

|note=*Fort Lauderdale CF and Toronto FC II had all their matches behind closed doors. Forward Madison FC New England Revolution II and North Carolina FC Had 1 game not reported.

== Regular season statistical leaders ==
=== Top scorers ===
Rank	Player	Club	Goals
1	(Argentina) Emiliano Terzaghi	Richmond Kickers	18
2	(Netherlands) Marios Lomis	Greenville Triumph SC	14
3	(Scotland) Greg Hurst	Union Omaha	13
4	(Canada) Shaan Hundal	Fort Lauderdale CF	11
4	(Italy) Marco Micaletto	Tormenta FC	11
6	(United States) Evan Conway	Union Omaha	10
6	(Colombia) Juan Galindrez	Chattanooga Red Wolves SC	10
8	(United States) Azaad Liadi	Tormenta FC	9
8	(England) Charlie Dennis	FC Tucson	9
10	(Saint Vincent and the Grenadines) Shak Adams	FC Tucson	8
10	(England) Mitchell Curry	Fort Lauderdale CF	8
10	(United States) Garrett McLaughlin	Toronto FC II	8

=== Hat-tricks ===
Player	Club	Against	Result	Date
(Scotland) Greg Hurst	Union Omaha	New England Revolution II	4–2 (H)	June 12, 2021
(Netherlands) Marios Lomis	Greenville Triumph SC	New England Revolution II	0–3 (A)	July 4, 2021
(United States) Garrett McLaughlin	Toronto FC II	North Carolina FC	2–4 (A)	July 18, 2021
(United States) Gio Calixtro	FC Tucson	Fort Lauderdale CF	0–4 (A)	August 22, 2021
(England) Charlie Dennis	FC Tucson	Greenville Triumph SC	3–3 (A)	September 19, 2021
(United States) Evan Conway	Union Omaha	Tormenta FC	0–4 (A)	October 1, 2021
(United States) Azaad Liadi	Tormenta FC	Fort Lauderdale CF	4–4 (A)	October 10, 2021
(United States) Evan Conway	Union Omaha	North Carolina FC	4–1 (H)	October 16, 2021

Notes

(H) – Home team
(A) – Away team

=== Top assists ===
Rank	Player	Club	Assists
1	(United States) Ricky Ruiz	Chattanooga Red Wolves SC	10
2	(United States) Devin Boyce	Union Omaha	8
2	(England) Charlie Dennis	FC Tucson	8
4	(United States) George Acosta	Fort Lauderdale CF	7
5	(United States) Conor Doyle	Union Omaha	6
5	(Canada) Kobe Franklin	Toronto FC II	6
5	(Austria) Luca Mayr-Fälten	Tormenta FC	6
5	(United States) Jake Rozhansky	New England Revolution II	6
9	(England) Mitchell Curry	Fort Lauderdale CF	5
9	(United States) Kalil ElMedkhar	North Texas SC	5
9	(Sierra Leone) Jay Tee Kamara	North Carolina FC	5
9	(United States) Azaad Liadi	Tormenta FC	5
9	(Spain) Damià Viader	Union Omaha	5

=== Clean sheets ===
Rank	Player	Club	Clean sheets
1	(Japan) Akira Fitzgerald	Richmond Kickers	10
2	(United States) Jake McGuire	North Carolina FC	9
2	(Ghana) Rashid Nuhu	Union Omaha	9
4	(United States) Joe Rice	New England Revolution II	8
5	(United States) Paul Christensen	Greenville Triumph SC	7
6	(Chile) Pablo Jara	Tormenta FC	5
6	(Guam) Dallas Jaye	Greenville Triumph SC	5
6	(United States) Tim Trilk	Chattanooga Red Wolves SC	5
9	(United States) Phil Breno	Forward Madison FC	4
9	(United States) Wallis Lapsley	FC Tucson	4
9	(Mexico) Richard Sánchez	North Texas SC	4
9	(United States) Colin Shutler	North Texas SC	4

== Individual awards ==
Award	Winner	Team	Reason	Ref.
Golden Boot	(Argentina) Emiliano Terzaghi	Richmond Kickers	18 goals (league record)	
Golden Glove	(Ghana) Rashid Nuhu	Union Omaha	9 shutouts, 0.75 goals against average	
Assist Champion	(United States) Ricky Ruiz	Chattanooga Red Wolves SC	10 assists	
Goalkeeper of the Year	(Japan) Akira Fitzgerald	Richmond Kickers	10 shutouts, 89 saves, 72.1 save percentage	
Defender of the Year	(Spain) Damià Viader	Union Omaha	6 goals, 5 assists, 58 key passes	
Coach of the Year	(United States) Jay Mims	Union Omaha	Won regular season title	
Young Player of the Year	(United States) Noah Allen	Fort Lauderdale CF	2,430 minutes, 35 interceptions, 28 key passes	
Most Valuable Player	(Argentina) Emiliano Terzaghi	Richmond Kickers	18 goals; 85 shots; 40 shots on target	
Goal of the Year	(United States) Devin Boyce	Union Omaha	vs FC Tucson in the playoffs	
Save of the Year	(United States) Joe Rice	New England Revolution II	vs Greenville	

== All-league teams ==
First team
Goalkeeper	Defenders	Midfielders	Forwards
(Japan) Akira Fitzgerald (RIC) (Goalkeeper of the Year)	(Canada) Kobe Franklin (TOR) (United States) Jason Ramos (CHA) (United States) Ryan Spaulding (NEW) (Spain) Damià Viader (OMA) (Defender of the Year)	(Italy) Marco Micaletto (TRM) (Republic of Ireland) Aaron Molloy (MAD) (United States) Ricky Ruiz (CHA) (Assist Champion)	(Scotland) Greg Hurst (OMA) (Netherlands) Marios Lomis (GVL) (Argentina) Emiliano Terzaghi (RIC) (Golden Boot and MVP)

Second team
Goalkeeper	Defenders	Midfielders	Forwards
(Ghana) Rashid Nuhu (OMA) (Golden Glove)	(United States) Noah Franke (TUC) (United States) Brandon Fricke (GVL) (Somalia) Abdi Mohamed (GVL) (United States) Connor Tobin (MAD)	(United States) Devin Boyce (OMA) (Goal of the Year) (England) Charlie Dennis (TUC) (United States) Aaron Walker (GVL)	(United States) Evan Conway (OMA) (Canada) Shaan Hundal (FTL) (United States) Gibran Rayo (NTX)

== Monthly awards ==
Month	Player of the Month			Goal of the Month			Save of the Month		Coach of the Month		References
Month	Player	Club	Position	Player	Club	Position	Player	Club	Coach	Club	References
April / May	(Netherlands) Marios Lomis	Greenville Triumph SC	Forward	(United States) Derek Gebhard	Forward Madison FC	Forward	(Guam) Dallas Jaye	Greenville Triumph SC	(England) Carl Craig	Forward Madison FC	
June	(Colombia) Juan Galindrez	Chattanooga Red Wolves SC	Forward	(Dominican Republic) Edison Azcona	Fort Lauderdale CF	Midfielder	(United States) Joe Rice	New England Revolution II	(United States) Jay Mims	Union Omaha	
July	(Argentina) Emiliano Terzaghi	Richmond Kickers	Forward	(Colombia) Juan Galindrez	Chattanooga Red Wolves SC	Forward	(United States) Joe Rice	New England Revolution II	(United States) John Bradford	North Carolina FC	
August	(Republic of Ireland) Aaron Molloy	Forward Madison FC	Midfielder	(Canada) Antonio Carlini	Toronto FC II	Midfielder	(Ghana) Rashid Nuhu	Union Omaha	(United States) Jimmy Obleda	Chattanooga Red Wolves SC	
September	(Spain) Damià Viader	Union Omaha	Defender	(United States) Nicky Hernandez	North Texas SC	Midfielder	(United States) Joe Rice	New England Revolution II	(United States) Jon Pearlman	FC Tucson	
October	(Argentina) Emiliano Terzaghi	Richmond Kickers	Forward	(Argentina) Zacarías Morán	Richmond Kickers	Midfielder	(United States) Joe Rice	New England Revolution II	(United States) John Harkes	Greenville Triumph SC	

== Weekly awards ==
Player of the Week
Week	Player	Club	Position	Ref.
1	(United States) Sean O'Hearn	New England Revolution II	Defender	
2	(United States) Juan Pablo Monticelli	Richmond Kickers	Defender	
3	(France) Thibaut Jacquel	North Texas SC	Forward	
4	(Netherlands) Marios Lomis	Greenville Triumph SC	Forward	
5	(Spain) Damià Viader	Union Omaha	Defender	
6	(United States) George Acosta	Fort Lauderdale CF	Midfielder	
7	(United States) Garrett McLaughlin	Toronto FC II	Forward	
8	(United States) Connor Tobin	Forward Madison FC	Defender	
9	(Spain) Nil Vinyals	Richmond Kickers	Midfielder	
10	(Scotland) Greg Hurst	Union Omaha	Forward	
11	(Colombia) Juan Galindrez	Chattanooga Red Wolves SC	Forward	
12	(Sierra Leone) Jay Tee Kamara	North Carolina FC	Midfielder	
13	(Argentina) Emiliano Terzaghi	Richmond Kickers	Forward	
14	(Brazil) Kazu	North Texas SC	Defender	
15	(United States) Garrett McLaughlin	Toronto FC II	Forward	
16	(Bosnia and Herzegovina) Robert Kristo	North Carolina FC	Forward	
17	(Bosnia and Herzegovina) Robert Kristo	North Carolina FC	Forward	
18	(United States) Damian Rivera	New England Revolution II	Forward	
19	(United States) Ricky Ruiz	Chattanooga Red Wolves SC	Midfielder	
20	(United States) Gio Calixtro	FC Tucson	Forward	
21	(Saint Vincent and the Grenadines) Shak Adams	FC Tucson	Forward	
22	(United States) Aaron Walker	Greenville Triumph SC	Forward	
23	(Palestine) Nazmi Albadawi	North Carolina FC	Midfielder	
24	(England) Charlie Dennis	FC Tucson	Midfielder	
25	(United States) Nicky Hernandez	North Texas SC	Forward	
26	(United States) Evan Conway	Union Omaha	Forward	
27	(United States) Azaad Liadi	Tormenta FC	Forward	
28	(United States) Evan Conway	Union Omaha	Forward	
29	(United States) Bernard Kamungo	North Texas SC	Midfielder	
30	(Somalia) Abdi Mohamed	Greenville Triumph SC	Defender	

Goal of the Week
Week	Player	Club	Opponent	Position	Ref.
1 & 2	(Canada) Shaan Hundal	Fort Lauderdale CF	Tormenta FC	Forward	
3	(United States) Evan Conway	Union Omaha	Tormenta FC	Forward	
4	(Australia) Lachlan McLean	Greenville Triumph SC	North Texas SC	Forward	
5	(United States) Jimmie Villalobos	Chattanooga Red Wolves SC	North Texas SC	Midfielder	
6	(United States) Derek Gebhard	Forward Madison FC	North Carolina FC	Forward	
7	(Netherlands) Marios Lomis	Greenville Triumph SC	Tormenta FC	Forward	
8	(Portugal) João Delgado	FC Tucson	Toronto FC II	Midfielder	
9	(Dominican Republic) Edison Azcona	Fort Lauderdale CF	North Carolina FC	Midfielder	
10	(United States) Kobe Perez	Tormenta FC	Toronto FC II	Midfielder	
11	(United States) Michael Tsicoulias	New England Revolution II	Forward Madison FC	Forward	
12	(Republic of Ireland) Aaron Molloy	Forward Madison FC	Greenville Triumph SC	Midfielder	
13	(Argentina) Emiliano Terzaghi	Richmond Kickers	North Texas SC	Forward	
14	(Colombia) Juan Galindrez	Chattanooga Red Wolves SC	FC Tucson	Forward	
15	(Colombia) Juan Galindrez	Chattanooga Red Wolves SC	Tormenta FC	Forward	
16	(United States) Noah Fuson	Forward Madison FC	Fort Lauderdale CF	Forward	
17	(Scotland) Greg Hurst	Union Omaha	North Texas SC	Forward	
18	(Canada) Antonio Carlini	Toronto FC II	Richmond Kickers	Midfielder	
19	(Germany) Jackson Dietrich	Chattanooga Red Wolves SC	North Carolina FC	Midfielder	
20	(Republic of Ireland) Aaron Molloy	Forward Madison FC	Toronto FC II	Midfielder	
21	(United States) Nelson Martinez	North Carolina FC	Forward Madison FC	Midfielder	
22	(Spain) Damià Viader	Union Omaha	North Carolina FC	Defender	
23	(United States) Azaad Liadi	Tormenta FC	North Texas SC	Forward	
24	(United States) George Acosta	Fort Lauderdale CF	Tormenta FC	Forward	
25	(United States) Nicky Hernandez	North Texas SC	North Carolina FC	Midfielder	
26	(United States) Evan Conway	Union Omaha	Tormenta FC	Forward	
27	(Argentina) Zacarías Morán	Richmond Kickers	North Texas SC	Midfielder	
28	(United States) Paul Rothrock	Toronto FC II	Chattanooga Red Wolves SC	Midfielder	
29	(Kenya) Tobias Otieno	Union Omaha	Richmond Kickers	Midfielder	
30	(United States) Christian Enriquez	Forward Madison FC	Chattanooga Red Wolves SC	Midfielder	

Save of the Week
Week	Player	Club	Opponent	Ref.
3	(United States) Luis Zamudio	Fort Lauderdale CF	North Texas SC	
4	(United States) Austin Aviza	Richmond Kickers	Fort Lauderdale CF	
5	(United States) Jake McGuire	North Carolina FC	Greenville Triumph SC	
6	(Ghana) Rashid Nuhu	Union Omaha	Greenville Triumph SC	
7	(Guam) Dallas Jaye	Greenville Triumph SC	Tormenta FC	
8	(United States) Phil Breno	Forward Madison FC	Tormenta FC	
9	(United States) Brad Knighton	New England Revolution II	Richmond Kickers	
10	(Chile) Pablo Jara	Tormenta FC	Toronto FC II	
11	(United States) Nick Holliday	North Carolina FC	Chattanooga Red Wolves SC	
12	(Ghana) Rashid Nuhu	Union Omaha	FC Tucson	
13	(United States) Joe Rice	New England Revolution II	Forward Madison FC	
14	(United States) Joe Rice	New England Revolution II	Toronto FC II	
15	(Estonia) Andreas Vaikla	Toronto FC II	North Carolina FC	
16	(United States) Phil Breno	Forward Madison FC	Fort Lauderdale CF	
17	(United States) Tim Trilk	Chattanooga Red Wolves SC	Forward Madison FC	
18	(United States) Nick Holliday	North Carolina FC	Forward Madison FC	
19	(Ghana) Rashid Nuhu	Union Omaha	FC Tucson	
20	(United States) Phil Breno	Forward Madison FC	North Texas SC	
21	(United States) Tim Trilk	Chattanooga Red Wolves SC	Toronto FC II	
22	(United States) Joe Rice	New England Revolution II	Tormenta FC	
23	(United States) Tim Trilk	Chattanooga Red Wolves SC	North Texas SC	
24	(United States) Nick Holliday	North Carolina FC	Chattanooga Red Wolves SC	
25	(United States) Joe Rice	New England Revolution II	Chattanooga Red Wolves SC	
26	(United States) Paul Christensen	Greenville Triumph SC	Fort Lauderdale CF	
27	(United States) Jake McGuire	North Carolina FC	Chattanooga Red Wolves SC	
28	(United States) Joe Rice	New England Revolution II	Greenville Triumph SC	
29	(United States) Phil Breno	Forward Madison FC	Union Omaha	
30	(United States) Jake McGuire	North Carolina FC	Greenville Triumph SC	

Team of the Week
Week	Goalkeeper	Defenders	Midfielders	Forwards	Ref.
**1–3**	(Ghana) Nuhu (OMA)	(United States) Polak (GVL) (Democratic Republic of the Congo) Sousa (OMA) (England) Hemmings (GVL) (United States) Waldeck (NTX)	(United States) Doyle (OMA) (United States) Pilato (GVL) (Argentina) Morán (RIC)	(France) **Jacquel** (NTX) (Scotland) Hurst (OMA) (United States) Rayo (NTX)	
**4**	(Guam) Jaye (GVL)	(England) Thorn (TRM) (England) Hardin (FTL) (United States) Fricke (GVL)	(Jamaica) Booth (GVL) (United States) Perez (TRM) (United States) Acosta (FTL) (Germany) Billhardt (TRM)	(Netherlands) **Lomis** (GVL) (Canada) Hundal (FTL) (Australia) McLean (GVL)	
**5**	(Japan) Fitzgerald (RIC)	(Spain) **Viader** (OMA) (Brazil) Magalhães (RIC) (Ghana) Osumanu (OMA)	(Mexico) García (CHA) (United States) Morrell (GVL) (United States) Scearce (OMA) (England) Corfe (TUC)	(Argentina) Terzaghi (RIC) (Australia) McLean (GVL) (United States) Villalobos (CHA)	
**6**	(Ghana) Nuhu (OMA)	(Japan) Toyama (MAD) (Spain) Viader (OMA) (United States) Ricketts (CHA)	(United States) **Acosta** (FTL) (Brazil) Firmino (OMA) (United States) España (CHA) (United States) Scearce (OMA)	(Jamaica) Evans (FTL) (United States) Gebhard (MAD) (Brazil) Santana (NTX)	
**7**	(Japan) Fitzgerald (RIC)	(Canada) Antonoglou (TOR) (United States) Polak (GVL) (United States) Crisler (RIC) (Senegal) Mbaye (NCA)	(Sierra Leone) Kamara (NCA) (United States) Ramos (CHA) (Jamaica) Smart (GVL)	(United States) **McLaughlin** (TOR) (Netherlands) Lomis (GVL) (United States) España (CHA)	
**8**	(United States) Edwards (NEW)	(United States) **Tobin** (MAD) (France) Cayet (NEW) (Mexico) Diaz (MAD) (Chile) Schenfeld (TUC)	(United States) Sukow (MAD) (United States) Rozhansky (NEW) (Mexico) García (CHA) (Republic of Ireland) Molloy (MAD)	(England) Corfe (TUC) (United States) Ruiz (CHA)	
**9**	(United States) Zamudio (FTL)	(United States) Monticelli (RIC) (Cuba) Rosales (FTL) (Spain) Viader (OMA)	(Spain) **Vinyals** (RIC) (United States) Acosta (FTL) (United States) Miscic (NCA) (Colombia) Bedoya (TUC)	(Bosnia and Herzegovina) Alihodžić (OMA) (United States) Liadi (TRM) (United States) Keegan (MAD)	
**10**	(Chile) Jara (TRM)	(United States) Burgess (NTX) (England) Thorn (TRM) (United States) Ricketts (CHA)	(United States) Perez (TRM) (United States) Boyce (OMA) (Italy) Micaletto (TRM) (England) Dennis (TUC)	(Scotland) **Hurst** (OMA) (United States) Ruiz (CHA) (United States) ElMedkhar (NTX)	
**11**	(United States) Lapsley (TUC)	(Democratic Republic of the Congo) Sousa (OMA) (United States) Spaulding (NEW) (United States) Eckenrode (TRM)	(Austria) Mayr-Fälten (TRM) (Canada) Marshall-Rutty (TOR) (Italy) Micaletto (TRM) (Canada) Nelson (TOR)	(Colombia) **Galindrez** (CHA) (Netherlands) Lomis (GVL) (United States) Hernández (CHA)	
**12**	(United States) Castanheira (FTL)	(United States) Flick (NCA) (Trinidad and Tobago) Singh (TOR) (Japan) Toyama (MAD) (United States) Spaulding (NEW)	(Sierra Leone) **Kamara** (NCA) (Republic of Ireland) Molloy (MAD) (United States) Rozhansky (NEW)	(Canada) Nelson (TOR) (Scotland) Hurst (OMA) (Guatemala) Rivera (NEW)	
**13**	(United States) Patterson-Sewell (TOR)	(Mexico) Díaz (MAD) (Spain) Viader (OMA) (Somalia) Mohamed (GVL)	(England) Dennis (TUC) (United States) Walker (GVL) (Canada) Okello (TOR) (Spain) Ferriol (TUC)	(Argentina) **Terzaghi** (RIC) (Netherlands) Lomis (GVL) (United States) Hernández (CHA)	
**14**	(United States) Christensen (GVL)	(Brazil) **Kazu** (NTX) (United States) Fricke (GVL) (United States) Munjoma (NTX) (United States) Spaulding (NEW) (United States) Martinez (NCA)	(United States) Ruiz (CHA) (United States) ElMedkhar (NTX) (Colombia) Bedoya (TUC)	(Colombia) Galindrez (CHA) (United States) Rayo (NTX)	
**15**	(United States) Trilk (CHA)	(United States) Tobin (MAD) (United States) Waldeck (NTX) (United States) Crisler (RIC)	(Trinidad and Tobago) Yeates (TOR) (Austria) Mayr-Fälten (TRM) (England) Dennis (TUC) (United States) Doyle (OMA) (United States) Walker (GVL)	(United States) **McLaughlin** (TOR) (Nigeria) Uzo (TUC)	
**16**	(United States) McGuire (NCA)	(Spain) Viader (OMA) (Cuba) Rosales (FTL) (Japan) Toyama (MAD) (United States) Spaulding (NEW)	(United States) Coan (NCA) (United States) Rozhansky (NEW) (Italy) Micaletto (TRM) (Kenya) Otieno (OMA)	(Bosnia and Herzegovina) **Kristo** (NCA) (Scotland) Hurst (OMA)	
**17**	(Japan) Fitzgerald (RIC)	(Canada) Franklin (TOR) (Spain) Viader (OMA) (United States) Maldonado (NTX)	(Sierra Leone) Kamara (NCA) (Republic of Ireland) Molloy (MAD) (Mexico) García (CHA) (England) Dennis (TUC)	(Bosnia and Herzegovina) **Kristo** (NCA) (Argentina) Terzaghi (RIC) (Scotland) Hurst (OMA)	
**18**	(United States) Rice (NEW)	(Canada) Franklin (TOR) (United States) Spaulding (NEW) (Canada) Petrasso (TOR)	(Austria) Mayr-Fälten (TRM) (Brazil) Kazu (NTX) (Canada) Carlini (TOR) (United States) Mueller (TRM)	(Uganda) Kizza (NEW) (Guatemala) **Rivera** (NEW) (United States) Liadi (TRM)	
**19**	(Ghana) Nuhu (OMA)	(United States) Ramos (CHA) (United States) Fernandes (MAD) (United States) Waldeck (NTX)	(United States) **Ruiz** (CHA) (United States) ElMedkhar (NTX) (Kenya) Otieno (OMA) (United States) Sukow (MAD) (England) Buck (NEW)	(England) Curry (FTL) (Argentina) Terzaghi (RIC)	
**20**	(Estonia) Vaikla (TOR)	(United States) Fox (TUC) (United States) Munjoma (NTX) (United States) Ramos (CHA) (Brazil) Magalhães (RIC)	(Republic of Ireland) Molloy (MAD) (England) Dennis (TUC) (United States) Ruiz (CHA) (Italy) Micaletto (TRM)	(United States) **Calixtro** (TUC) (France) Jacquel (NTX)	
**21**	(Estonia) Vaikla (TOR)	(El Salvador) Blanco (NCA) (United States) Franke (TUC) (United States) Ramos (CHA)	(United States) Acosta (FTL) (England) Dennis (TUC) (Palestine) Albadawi (NCA) (United States) Hernandez (NTX)	(Saint Vincent and the Grenadines) **Adams** (TUC) (England) Curry (FTL) (United States) Liadi (TRM)	
**22**	(United States) Callender (FTL)	(Spain) Viader (OMA) (United States) Franke (TUC) (United States) Ricketts (CHA) (United States) Spaulding (NEW)	(United States) **Walker** (GVL) (Colombia) Bedoya (TUC) (United States) Scearce (OMA) (Jamaica) Booth (GVL)	(United States) Liadi (TRM) (England) Donnelly (GVL)	
**23**	(United States) Breno (MAD)	(Italy) Mastrantonio (TUC) (Somalia) Mohamed (GVL) (United States) Ricketts (CHA)	(Palestine) **Albadawi** (NCA) (United States) Scearce (OMA) (Sierra Leone) Kamara (NCA) (United States) Boyce (OMA) (Austria) Mayr-Fälten (TRM)	(England) Corfe (TUC) (United States) Coan (NCA)	
**24**	(United States) Breno (MAD)	(Spain) Viader (OMA) (United States) Ricketts (CHA) (Chile) Schenfeld (TUC)	(England) **Dennis** (TUC) (United States) Walker (GVL) (Italy) Micaletto (TRM) (United States) Rozhansky (NEW)	(United States) ElMedkhar (NTX) (United States) Hernández (CHA) (Guatemala) Rivera (NEW)	
**25**	(United States) Rice (NEW)	(United States) Leonard (MAD) (Chile) Schenfeld (TUC) (Guinea-Bissau) Gomes (NTX) (United States) Lee (GVL)	(Portugal) Delgado (TUC) (Spain) Vinyals (RIC) (Republic of Ireland) Molloy (MAD)	(United States) **Hernandez** (NTX) (Argentina) Terzaghi (RIC) (United States) Rennicks (NEW)	
**26**	(Japan) Fitzgerald (RIC)	(Canada) Franklin (TOR) (United States) Verfurth (NEW) (Somalia) Mohamed (GVL) (Canada) Petrasso (TOR)	(United States) Boyce (OMA) (Republic of Ireland) Molloy (MAD) (Kenya) Otieno (OMA)	(United States) **Conway** (OMA) (United States) ElMedkhar (NTX) (Argentina) Terzaghi (RIC)	
**27**	(United States) Christensen (GVL)	(Spain) Viader (OMA) (Brazil) Magalhães (RIC) (United States) Ricketts (CHA) (United States) Politz (TOR)	(United States) Boyce (OMA) (Argentina) Morán (RIC) (United States) Ortiz (CHA)	(United States) **Liadi** (TRM) (Scotland) Hurst (OMA) (England) Curry (FTL)	
**28**	(United States) Rice (NEW)	(Canada) Franklin (TOR) (Kenya) Otieno (OMA) (El Salvador) Blanco (NCA)	(United States) Boyce (OMA) (United States) ElMedkhar (NTX) (England) Dennis (TUC) (United States) Gavilanes (GVL)	(United States) **Conway** (OMA) (United States) Rodriguez (TUC) (Argentina) Terzaghi (RIC)	
**29**	(Mexico) Sánchez (NTX)	(United States) Knutson (OMA) (United States) Tobin (MAD) (El Salvador) Blanco (NCA)	(Republic of Ireland) Molloy (MAD) (Saint Lucia) Pearson (NCA) (United States) **Kamungo** (GVL) (England) Dennis (TUC) (United States) Munjoma (NTX)	(Trinidad and Tobago) Trimmingham (MAD) (Canada) Hundal (FTL)	
**30**	(United States) Christensen (GVL)	(Canada) Petrasso (TOR) (Somalia) **Mohamed** (GVL) (Chile) Schenfeld (TUC) (Italy) Mastrantonio (TUC)	(United States) Rothrock (TOR) (Portugal) Delgado (TUC) (United States) Ferri (NTX) (Trinidad and Tobago) Yeates (TOR)	(Argentina) Terzaghi (RIC) (Saint Vincent and the Grenadines) Adams (TUC)	
**Bold** denotes Player of the Week

== See also ==
- USL League One
- 2021 USL Championship season
- 2021 USL League Two season
