= 2019 Chattanooga Red Wolves SC season =

Chattanooga Red Wolves SC
2019 season
- Owner: Robert Martino
- Head coach: Tim Hankinson
- Stadium: Dave Stanton Field
- USL League One: 7th
- U.S. Open Cup: First round
- Top goalscorer: League: Steven Beattie (3); All: Steven Beattie (3)
- Highest home attendance: 2,527 (April 6 vs. Forward Madison FC)
- Lowest home attendance: 1,235 (September 28 vs. Richmond Kickers)
- Average home league attendance: 1,632
- Biggest win: 2–0 (June 15 v. Richmond Kickers)
- Biggest defeat: 0–4 (May 18 v. FC Tucson)
Home colors	Away colors

The 2019 season was Chattanooga Red Wolves SC's first of existence. They played in USL League One.

== Background ==
The formation of USL League One was announced in April 2017, and league officials began touring the country looking for candidate cities for new soccer clubs, one of which was Chattanooga, Tennessee. In August 2018, Chattanooga was announced as an expansion team. On September 11, 2018, the club announced their first head coach, Tim Hankinson. The club then officially announced their name, Chattanooga Red Wolves SC, on September 25, 2018.

== Club ==
=== Roster ===
As of July 28, 2019.

No.	Position	Nation	Player
1	GK	ENG	Greg Hartley
2	DF	JAM	Richard Dixon
3	DF	ARG	Jonathan Caparelli
5	DF	USA	Leo Folla
6	DF	ALB	Vangjel Zguro
7	MF	BRA	Ualefi
8	MF	USA	Josue Soto
9	FW	ARG	Juan Mare
10	MF	IRL	Steven Beattie
11	FW	ESP	Sito Seoane
12	FW	LBA	Éamon Zayed
13	DF	GHA	Nicholas Amponsah
14	MF	USA	Amirgy Pineda
15	FW	USA	Yaya Cisse
16	DF	USA	Andrew Kendall-Moullin
19	MF	CAN	Jamie Dell
20	DF	USA	Tony Walls
21	FW	USA	Alex Jaimes
22	FW	USA	Conor Doyle
24	GK	USA	Alex Mangels
27	GK	USA	Will Dieterich
32	DF	IRL	Colin Falvey

=== Team management ===
Position	Name
Head coach	(United States) Tim Hankinson
Assistant & goalkeeping coach	(United States) David Barrueta

== Competitions ==
=== Pre-season friendlies ===
==== Match reports ====
February 24th, 2019 1	Chattanooga Red Wolves	1-1	Atlanta United 2	Chattanooga, Tennessee
2:00 PM EDT	Juan Mare 11'	Report	Patrick Okonkwo 55'	Stadium: David Stanton Field

March 17, 2019 2	Chattanooga Red Wolves	1–1	Louisville City FC	Chattanooga, Tennessee
11:00 AM EDT	Caparelli 88'	Report	Rasmussen 45'	Stadium: David Stanton Field

=== USL League One ===
==== Standings ====
Pos	Team	Pld	W	D	L	GF	GA	GD	Pts	Qualification
3	Greenville Triumph SC	28	12	7	9	32	22	+10	43	Playoffs
4	Forward Madison FC	28	12	7	9	33	26	+7	43	Playoffs
5	Chattanooga Red Wolves SC	28	10	10	8	35	37	−2	40	
6	South Georgia Tormenta FC	28	9	10	9	32	34	−2	37	
7	Toronto FC II	28	9	9	10	43	46	−3	36	

Source: 2019 USL League One standings
Rules for classification: 1) total wins; 2) total goal differential; 3) total goals scored; 4) points earned against top four Conference finishers; 5) disciplinary points; 6) coin toss or drawing of lots

==== Results by round ====
Round	1	2	3	4	5	6	7	8	9	10	11	12	13	14	15	16	17	18	19	20	21	22	23	24	25	26	27	28
Stadium	A	H	A	H	A	A	H	A	H	H	A	H	H	H	A	A	H	A	H	A	H	A	A	A	A	H	H	H
Result	L	W	L	W	L	D	D	L	W	D	W	W	W	D	D	D	D	L	W	W	L	D	L	D	L	W	W	D
Position	6	6	7	5	8	6	7	9	7	7	5	4	3	3	3	3	3	6	5	3	4	6	6	6	6	5	5	5

Source: USL
A = Away; H = Home; W = Win; D = Draw; L = Loss

==== Match reports ====
March 30, 2019 1	North Texas	3–2	Chattanooga Red Wolves	Frisco, Texas
7:00 PM CDT	Pepi 13' 62' 77'; Servania (yellow card) 67'	Report	Soto (yellow card) 51'; Dixon (yellow card) 53'; 90+2'; Beattie 84'	Stadium: Toyota Stadium; Attendance: 2,119; Referee: Marco Vega

April 6, 2019 2	Chattanooga Red Wolves	1–0	Forward Madison	Chattanooga, Tennessee
7:00 PM CDT	Zayed 67'	Report		Stadium: David Stanton Field; Attendance: 3,527; Referee: Danielle Chesky

April 13, 2019 3	Greenville Triumph	1–0	Chattanooga Red Wolves	Greenville, South Carolina
7:00 PM EDT	Walker (yellow card) 61'; Keegan 74'; Bermudez (yellow card) 90'; Saul (yellow card) 90+4'	Report	Dixon (yellow card) 31'; Folla (yellow card) 36'; Beattie (yellow card) 47'	Stadium: Legacy Early College Field; Attendance: 2,016; Referee: John Matto

April 20, 2019 4	Chattanooga Red Wolves	3–2	Tormenta	Chattanooga, Tennessee
7:00 PM EDT	Beattie 8', 17' (yellow card) 36'; Zayed 11'; Ualefi (yellow card) 69'; Dixon (yellow card) 79'; Zguro (yellow card) 90+4'	Report	Gómez (yellow card) 47'; Antley 74' (yellow card) 90+1'; Hellmann 88'	Stadium: David Stanton Field; Attendance: 2,119; Referee: Ben Meyer

April 27, 2019 5	Richmond Kickers	1–0	Chattanooga Red Wolves	Richmond, Virginia
7:00 PM EDT	Gallardo (yellow card) 32' (goal) 52'	Report	Doyle (yellow card) 20'; Kendall-Moullin (yellow card) 28'; Zayed (yellow card) 37'	Stadium: City Stadium; Attendance: 2,743; Referee: Katja Koroleva

May 3, 2019 6	Orlando City B	0–0	Chattanooga Red Wolves	Montverde, Florida
EDT	Silva (yellow card) 37'	Report	Folla (yellow card) 88'	Stadium: Montverde Academy; Referee: Tori Penso

May 11, 2019 7	Chattanooga Red Wolves	2–2	Forward Madison	Chattanooga, Tennessee
7:00 PM EDT	Doyle 2'; Zayed 56'	Report	Zguro 53' (o.g.); Núñez 55'	Stadium: David Stanton Field; Attendance: 1,423; Referee: Amin Hadzic

May 18, 2019 8	FC Tucson	4–0	Chattanooga Red Wolves	Tucson, Arizona
10:30 PM EDT	Jones 25' (pen.); Wakasa 35'; Jambga 66', 75'; Hanlin (yellow card) 77'; Stripling (yellow card) 86'	Report	Caparelli (yellow card) 24'; Zguro (yellow card) 29'	Stadium: Kino Veterans Memorial Stadium; Attendance: 1,125; Referee: Brad Jensen

May 25, 2019 9	Chattanooga Red Wolves	1–0	Greenville Triumph	Chattanooga, Tennessee
7:00 PM EDT	Pineda (yellow card) 64'; Falvey (yellow card) 90'; Zayed 90+4'; Folla (yellow card) 90+6'	Report	Clowes (yellow card) 81'	Stadium: David Stanton Field; Attendance: 2,256; Referee: Michael Smith

June 1, 2019 10	Chattanooga Red Wolves	2–2	Toronto FC II	Chattanooga, Tennessee
7:00 PM EDT	Doyle 38', (yellow card) 90+4'; Falvey (yellow card) 71', (goal) 83'; Walls (yellow card) 90+3'	Report	Mingo (yellow card) 26'; Hundal 69'; Shaffelburg 73'	Stadium: David Stanton Field; Attendance: 2,597; Referee: Gabriele Giusti

June 8, 2019 11	Tormenta FC	P–P	Chattanooga Red Wolves	Statesboro, Georgia
8:00 PM EDT		Report		Stadium: Eagle Field at Erk Russell Park; Referee: Luis Arroyo
Note: Match postponed to be played at a date TBD

June 15, 2019 12	Richmond Kickers	0–2	Chattanooga Red Wolves	Richmond, Virginia
7:00 PM EDT	Mwape (yellow card) 43'; Gallardo (yellow card) 90+2'	Report	Mare (yellow card) 41'; Pineda 63'; Caparelli (yellow card) 73'; Soto (yellow card) 90+1'; Seoane 90+2'	Stadium: City Stadium; Attendance: 4,233; Referee: Joshua Encarnacion

June 22, 2019 13	Chattanooga Red Wolves	3–2	Greenville Triumph	Chattanooga, Tennessee
7:00 PM EDT	Beattie 19', 38', 77'; Caparelli (yellow card) 59'	Report	Keegan 52', 62'; Boland (yellow card) 64'; Polak (yellow card) 73'; Bermudez (yellow card) 88'	Stadium: David Stanton Field; Attendance: 2,137; Referee: John Griggs

June 29, 2019 14	Chattanooga Red Wolves	1–0	Richmond Kickers	Chattanooga, Tennessee
7:00 PM EDT	Beattie 7'; Walls (yellow card) 11'; Cisse (yellow card) 45+1'	Report	Ainscough (yellow card) 18'; Troyer (yellow card) 53'; Ackwei (yellow card) 53'; Boateng (yellow card) 57'; Magalhães (yellow card) 86'	Stadium: David Stanton Field; Attendance: 1,572; Referee: Nickrod Fateh

July 6, 2019 15	Chattanooga Red Wolves	1–1	Lansing Ignite FC	Chattanooga, Tennessee
7:00 PM EDT	Cisse (red card) 12'; Walls 55'	Report	N'For 25'; Fricke (yellow card) 30'; Coiffic (red card) 45'; Moon (yellow card) 57'	Stadium: David Stanton Field; Attendance: 1,766; Referee: Michael Smith

July 10, 2019 16	Orlando City B	1–1	Chattanooga Red Wolves	Montverde, Florida
7:30 PM EDT	Tablante (yellow card) 25'; Silva (yellow card) 87' (yellow-red card) 88'; Mbuyu 90+1'	Report	Seoane 13'; Ualefi (yellow card) 56'; Doyle (yellow card) 86'	Stadium: Montverde Academy; Referee: Tori Penso

July 13, 2019 17	Forward Madison FC	1–1	Chattanooga Red Wolves	Madison, Wisconsin
7:00 PM EDT	Núñez (yellow card) 17'; Tobin 20'; Bement (yellow card) 13'	Report	Ualefi (yellow card) 22'; Beattie (yellow card) 54'; Walls (yellow card) 58'; Amponsah 77'	Stadium: Breese Stevens Field; Attendance: 4,442; Referee: Becky Pagan

July 27, 2019 18	Chattanooga Red Wolves	1–1	FC Tucson	Chattanooga, Tennessee
7:00 PM EDT	Zguro (yellow card) 20'; Beattie (yellow card) 38'; Doyle (yellow card) 59'; Zayed 69'; Caparelli (yellow card) 85'	Report	Venter 1'; Wheeler-Omiunu (yellow card) 36'; Howell (yellow card) 45+5'; Hauswirth (yellow card) 75'	Stadium: David Stanton Field; Attendance: 1,325; Referee: Katja Koroleva

July 31, 2019 19	Lansing Ignite FC	2–0	Chattanooga Red Wolves	Lansing, Michigan
7:00 PM EDT	Moshobane 32'; Mentzigen (yellow card) 50'; Faz 84'	Report	Kendall-Moullin (yellow card) 10'; Pineda (yellow card) 45+1'	Stadium: Cooley Law School Stadium; Attendance: 2,215; Referee: José Lara

August 3, 2019 20	Chattanooga Red Wolves	1–0	North Texas SC	Chattanooga, Tennessee
7:00 PM EDT	Beattie 54' (pen.); Folla (yellow card) 57'; Doyle (yellow card) 73'; Ualefi (yellow card) 90+1'; Seoane (yellow card) 90+4'	Report	Bissainthe (yellow card) 40' (yellow-red card) 70'	Stadium: David Stanton Field; Attendance: 1,116; Referee: Jasmine Peralta

August 10, 2019 21	Tormenta FC	1–2	Chattanooga Red Wolves	Statesboro, Georgia
8:00 PM EDT	Phelps (yellow card) 47'; Coutinho 67'; Rowe (yellow card) 74'	Report	Beattie (yellow card) 27'; Seoane 57'; Soto 84', (yellow card) 87'	Stadium: Eagle Field at Erk Russell Park; Attendance: 1,560; Referee: Luis Arroyo

August 17, 2019 22	Chattanooga Red Wolves	0–2	North Texas SC	Chattanooga, Tennessee
7:00 PM EDT	Doyle (yellow card) 54'; Cisse (yellow card) 87'	Report	Montgomery 35', (yellow card) 42'; Danso (yellow card) 39'; Damus 87'	Stadium: David Stanton Field; Attendance: 1,084; Referee: Eric Tattersall

August 21, 2019 11	Tormenta FC	1–1	Chattanooga Red Wolves	Statesboro, Georgia
8:00 PM EDT	Dennis (yellow card) 8', (goal) 28'; Phelps (yellow card) 30'	Report	Folla (yellow card) 22'; Seoane 58'; Zguro (yellow card) 70'; Hurst (yellow card) 81'	Stadium: Eagle Field at Erk Russell Park; Attendance: 1,598; Referee: Adam Kilpatrick
Note: Reschedule of postponed June 8 match.

August 30, 2019 23	FC Tucson	1–0	Chattanooga Red Wolves	Tucson, Arizona
10:30 PM EDT	Jones 16' (pen.); Hauswirth (yellow card) 38'; Wakasa (yellow card) 38'; Terrón (yellow card) 90+4'	Report	Mare (yellow card) 86'	Stadium: Kino Veterans Memorial Stadium; Attendance: 910; Referee: Samantha Martinez

September 6, 2019 24	Toronto FC II	2–2	Chattanooga Red Wolves	Toronto, Ontario
4:00 PM EDT	Mingo (yellow card) 28'; Perruzza 31' (pen.); Faria 72'; West (yellow card) 74'; Bunk-Andersen (yellow card) 90+1'	Report	Walls (yellow card) 33'; Folla (yellow card) 42'; Beattie 51' (pen.); Mehl (yellow card) 71'; Zayed 83'	Stadium: BMO Training Ground; Referee: Seyed-Mohammad Mohseni

September 14, 2019 25	Lansing Ignite FC	4–3	Chattanooga Red Wolves	Lansing, Michigan
7:00 PM EDT	Mentzingen 8'; Moshobane 18', 90'; Moon 30', (yellow card) 79'; Gomez (yellow card) 60'; Carr (yellow card) 77'	Report	Zguro 3', (red card) 60'; Hurst 17', 54'; Amponsah (yellow card) 35'; Beattie (yellow card) 43'	Stadium: Cooley Law School Stadium; Attendance: 2,994; Referee: Calin Radosav

September 21, 2019 26	Chattanooga Red Wolves	2–1	Orlando City B	Chattanooga, Tennessee
7:00 PM EDT	Folla (yellow card) 20' (yellow-red card) 74'; Seoane 34'; Soto (yellow card) 50'; Walls 54'; Mare (yellow card) 90+1'; Amponsah (yellow card) 90+3'	Report	Léo 45+1', (yellow card) 62' (yellow-red card) 67'; Sérginho (yellow card) 84'; John (yellow card) 88'	Stadium: David Stanton Field; Attendance: 1,173; Referee: Nickrod Fateh

September 28, 2019 27	Chattanooga Red Wolves	2–1	Richmond Kickers	Chattanooga, Tennessee
7:00 PM EDT	Ualefi 24' (pen.); Seoane 32'; Kendall-Moullin (yellow card) 37'; Zguro (yellow card) 44'; Walls (yellow card) 73'; Jaimes (yellow card) 88'	Report	Troyer (red card) 23'; Eckenrode (yellow card) 28'; Boateng 65'; Rodriguez (yellow card) 90+6'	Stadium: David Stanton Field; Attendance: 1,235; Referee: Joshua Encarnación

October 5, 2019 28	Chattanooga Red Wolves	1–1	Toronto FC II	Chattanooga, Tennessee
7:00 PM EDT	Seoane 8', (yellow card) 88'; Hurst (yellow card) 57'	Report	Perruzza 86'; Akinola (yellow card) 90+3'	Stadium: David Stanton Field; Attendance: 1,512; Referee: John Griggs

=== U.S. Open Cup ===
May 7, 2019 First round	Tormenta 2 (Georgia (U.S. state))	3–0	(Tennessee) Chattanooga Red Wolves	Statesboro, Georgia
7:00 pm EDT	Wigfall 25' (Meehan); McCall (yellow card) 43'; Mayr-Fälten 58' (Billhardt); Billhardt 74' (Mayr-Fälten); Richards (yellow card) 82'		Kendall-Moullin (yellow card) 6'; Pineda (yellow card) 40'	Stadium: Erk Russell Park; Attendance: 544; Referee: Aleksandar Zhelyazkov

== Transfers ==
=== In ===
Pos.	Nat.	Player	Transferred from	Fee/notes	Date	Source
DF	ARG	Jonathan Caparelli	FC Golden State Force (United States)	Free transfer	December 3, 2018	
DF	JAM	Richard Dixon	OKC Energy (United States)	Free transfer	December 5, 2018	
MF	BRA	Ualefi	Barretos (Brazil)	Free transfer	December 13, 2018	
DF	ALB	Vangjel Zguro	Kukësi (Albania)	Free transfer	January 2, 2019	
DF	USA	Leo Folla	Härnösands (Sweden)	Free transfer	January 10, 2019	

== Statistics ==
=== Appearances and goals ===
No.	Pos	Nat	Player	Total		USL1		U.S. Open Cup	
No.	Pos	Nat	Player	Apps	Goals	Apps	Goals	Apps	Goals

=== Disciplinary record ===
Updated: July 28, 2019

No.	Pos.	Name	USL1		U.S. Open Cup		Total	
No.	Pos.	Name	Yellow card	Red card	Yellow card	Red card	Yellow card	Red card
1	GK	Greg Hartley	0	0	0	0	0	0
2	DF	Richard Dixon	3	0	0	0	3	0
3	DF	Jonathan Caparelli	4	0	0	0	4	0
5	DF	Leo Folla	3	0	0	0	3	0
6	DF	Vangjel Zguro	5	0	0	0	5	0
7	MF	Ualefi	3	0	0	0	3	0
8	MF	Josue Soto	2	0	0	0	2	0
9	FW	Juan Mare	1	0	0	0	1	0
10	MF	Steven Beattie	5	0	0	0	5	0
11	FW	Sito Seoane	1	0	0	0	1	0
12	FW	Éamon Zayed	1	0	0	0	1	0
13	DF	Nicholas Amponsah	0	0	0	0	0	0
14	MF	Amirgy Pineda	1	0	1	0	2	0
15	FW	Yaya Cisse	1	1	0	0	1	1
16	DF	Andrew Kendall-Moullin	1	0	1	0	2	0
19	MF	Jamie Dell	0	0	0	0	0	0
20	DF	Tony Walls	5	0	0	0	5	0
22	FW	Conor Doyle	4	0	0	0	4	0
24	GK	Alex Mangels	0	0	0	0	0	0
27	GK	Will Dieterich	0	0	0	0	0	0
32	DF	Colin Falvey	2	0	0	0	2	0
