= Tim Trilk =

American soccer player

Personal information
- Date of birth: August 15, 1998 (age 28)
- Place of birth: Rockford, Illinois, United States
- Height: 1.88 m (6 ft 2 in)
- Position: Goalkeeper

College career
Years	Team	Apps	(Gls)
2016–2019	Western Illinois Leathernecks	49	(0)

Senior career*
Years	Team	Apps	(Gls)
2018–2019	Tri-Cities Otters	7	(0)
2020–2021	Chattanooga Red Wolves	19	(0)
2022–2023	Indy Eleven	30	(0)
2024	Chattanooga Red Wolves	0	(0)
- * Club domestic league appearances and goals as of November 22, 2024

Tim Trilk (born August 15, 1998) is an American soccer player who plays as a goalkeeper. He is currently a free agent after recently playing for Chattanooga Red Wolves in the USL League One.

== College career ==
Trilk played four years of college soccer at the University of Western Illinois. He played in 49 games, and had seven saves in 2019 Summit League tournament semifinals.

== Club career ==
After going undrafted in the 2020 MLS SuperDraft, Trilk signed a contract with Chattanooga Red Wolves SC ahead of the 2020 USL League One season. Trilk re-signed with Chattanooga following the 2020 season.

On July 19, 2021, Trilik was named to the Week 15 USL League One Team of the Week.

On February 16, 2022, Trilk signed with USL Championship side Indy Eleven.

Indy Eleven announced Trilk's departure at the end of the 2023 season on November 30, 2023.

Trilk returned to Chattanooga Red Wolves on January 31, 2024.

== Career statistics ==
As of match played October 22, 2023

Appearances and goals by club, season and competition
Club	Season	League			National Cup		Playoffs		Total	
Club	Season	Division	Apps	Goals	Apps	Goals	Apps	Goals	Apps	Goals
Tri-Cities Otters	2018	USL League Two	2	0	0	0	0	0	2	0
Tri-Cities Otters	2019	USL League Two	5	0	0	0	0	0	5	0
Total:			7	0	0	0	0	0	7	0
Chattanooga Red Wolves SC	2020	USL League One	0	0	0	0	0	0	0	0
Chattanooga Red Wolves SC	2021	USL League One	19	0	0	0	2	0	21	0
Total:			19	0	0	0	0	0	21	0
Indy Eleven	2022	USL Championship	15	0	1	0	0	0	16	0
Indy Eleven	2023	USL Championship	14	0	0	0	1	0	15	0
Total:			29	0	1	0	1	0	31	0
Career total			55	0	1	0	3	0	59	0
