= Ronaldo Pineda =

American soccer player

Personal information
- Date of birth: August 26, 1996 (age 30)
- Place of birth: Santa Ana, California, United States
- Height: 1.84 m (6 ft 0 in)
- Position: Midfielder

Team information
- Current team: Los Angeles Force
- Number: 16

College career
Years	Team	Apps	(Gls)
2015–2017	Cal State Fullerton Titans	37	(4)

Senior career*
Years	Team	Apps	(Gls)
2016	Golden State Force	2	(0)
2019	Park City Red Wolves	10	(4)
2020–2022	Chattanooga Red Wolves	38	(0)
2023	Albion San Diego	16	(1)
2024–	Los Angeles Force	6	(0)
- * Club domestic league appearances and goals as of October 28, 2024

Ronaldo Pineda (born August 26, 1996) is an American soccer player who plays as a midfielder for the Los Angeles Force in the National Independent Soccer Association.

== Career ==
=== Chattanooga Red Wolves ===
In 2019, Pineda played as a member of Chattanooga's USL League Two affiliate team Park City Red Wolves. This paved the way for him to sign with the USL League One club in January 2020. He made his league debut for the club on July 25, 2020, against Tormenta FC.
