= Steven Beattie =

Irish footballer

Personal information
- Date of birth: 20 August 1988 (age 38)
- Place of birth: Skerries, County Dublin, Ireland
- Height: 1.78 m (5 ft 10 in)
- Positions: Forward; midfielder

Youth career
- 2001–2006: Skerries Town

College career
Years	Team	Apps	(Gls)
2007–2010	Northern Kentucky Norse	90	(77)

Senior career*
Years	Team	Apps	(Gls)
2011	Puerto Rico Islanders	1	(0)
2012–2013	UMF Tindastóll	32	(11)
2014–2015	Bohemians	29	(4)
2015	Sligo Rovers	14	(2)
2015–2019	Cork City	85	(9)
2019–2020	Chattanooga Red Wolves	32	(11)
2021	Cork City	11	(0)
- * Club domestic league appearances and goals as of 2 December 2021

Steven Beattie (born 8 August 1988) is an Irish footballer who most recently played for League of Ireland First Division club Cork City.

== Career ==
=== Initial career stumbles in North America and move to Iceland ===
Beattie was a three-time All American at Northern Kentucky University and was drafted by in the first round of the 2011 MLS Supplemental Draft by Toronto FC, however he was never signed by the team. He signed with the Puerto Rico Islanders of the NASL, but was injured in his first game. To get his career back on track he signed with second division Icelandic club Tindastóll. In his first half-season with the club, Beattie scored 4 goals in 10 appearances. In his second and only full season with Tindastóll he made 21 appearances in the league, while making 2 Super Cup appearances, he scored 7 total goals.

=== Initial successes in Ireland ===
After his second season with the club he moved to the League of Ireland, playing with three clubs between 2014 and 2019, most prominently with Cork City. After impressing in Iceland, Beattie moved to Dublin side Bohemians where he made 29 appearances and scored 4 goals, with 5 Cup appearances, in his only season with the club. After a season in Dublin Beattie moved to Sligo Rovers F.C. Beattie only spent half of a season in Sligo however, scoring 2 goals, before moving to Cork City. During his time in Cork, Beattie played in over 100 games and scored over 10 goals. While in Cork, Beattie's trophy cabinet grew, with the club winning one League of Ireland title, two FAI Cup titles, three President's Cup titles, and two Munster Senior League titles.

=== USL League One and Chattanooga ===
Most recently he moved to U.S. based club Chattanooga Red Wolves to play in the newly created USL League One, the third-division of American Soccer. Before the season began, Beattie was named the team's captain. On 30 March 2019 Beattie scored the first goal in Red Wolves history from nearly 30 yards out in the 83rd minute of a 3–2 loss to North Texas SC. In addition to the first goal in Red Wolves' history, Beattie was also named to the first ever USL League One team of the week on 2 April 2019. On April 23, 2019, Beattie was named the Player of the Week for Week 4 of the 2019 campaign. Throughout the Red Wolves' campaign, Beattie was considered one of the bright spots of both the team and the league, however, despite this, it was not enough for the Red Wolves to make the league playoffs with the team finishing in 5th place, one spot out. On October 16, 2019, Beattie was named to the USL League One All League First Team as one of the best players of the season.

=== Return to Cork City ===
On 11 January 2021 Cork City announced that Beattie was returning to the club. Beattie noted that he "always wanted to return to the club at some stage" and was ready to "try and get the club back to where it belongs." Beattie re-debuted for the club in 1–0 loss to Cabinteely. On 2 December 2021, it was announced that Beattie would be leaving the club.

== Career statistics ==
As of 2 December 2021

Appearances and goals by club, season and competition
Club	Season	League			National Cup		League Cup		Europe		Other		Total	
Club	Season	Division	Apps	Goals	Apps	Goals	Apps	Goals	Apps	Goals	Apps	Goals	Apps	Goals
UMF Tindastóll	2012	1. deild	10	4	–		–		–		–		10	4
UMF Tindastóll	2013	1. deild	21	7	2	0	–		–		–		23	7
UMF Tindastóll	UMF Tindastóll Total		31	11	2	0	–		–		–		33	11
Bohemians	2014	League of Ireland Premier Division	29	4	3	1	4	0	–		1 (Note: Appearances in Leinster Senior Cup)	1	37	6
Sligo Rovers	2015	League of Ireland Premier Division	14	2	1	0	1	0	–		–		16	2
Cork City	2015	League of Ireland Premier Division	14	3	–		–		–		–		14	3
Cork City	2016	League of Ireland Premier Division	29	5	5	0	1	0	6 (Note: Appearances in UEFA Europa League)	0	2 (Note: 1 appearance in President of Ireland's Cup & 1 appearance in Munster Senior Cup)	0	43	5
Cork City	2017	League of Ireland Premier Division	23	1	2	0	2	0	4	1	3 (Note: 1 appearance in President of Ireland's Cup & 2 appearances in Munster Senior Cup)	0	34	2
Cork City	2018	League of Ireland Premier Division	19	0	2	0	0	0	4 (Note: 2 appearances in UEFA Champions League & 2 appearances in UEFA Europa League)	0	1 (Note: Appearances in President of Ireland's Cup)	0	26	0
Cork City	Cork City Subtotal		85	9	9	0	3	0	14	1	6	0	117	10
Chattanooga Red Wolves	2019	USL League One	24	9	1	0	–		–		–		25	9
Chattanooga Red Wolves	2020	USL League One	8	2	0	0	–		–		–		8	2
Chattanooga Red Wolves	Chattanooga Red Wolves Total		32	11	1	0	–		–		–		33	11
Cork City	2021	League of Ireland First Division	11	0	1	0	–		–		–		12	0
Cork City	Cork City Total		96	9	10	0	3	0	14	1	6	0	129	10
Total			202	37	17	1	8	0	14	1	7	1	248	40

== Honours ==
Cork City

- League of Ireland Premier Division: 2017
- FAI Cup: 2016, 2017
- President of Ireland's Cup: 2016, 2017, 2018
- Munster Senior Cup: 2016–17, 2017–18
