= Jimmy Obleda =

American soccer coach

Personal information
- Date of birth: July 21, 1972 (age 54)
- Place of birth: New York, New York, U.S.
- Position: Forward

Senior career*
Years	Team	Apps	(Gls)
- Danubio
- Cerro
- Liverpool Montevideo
- Irapuato
- Ponnistus
- Fort Lauderdale Strikers

Managerial career
- 2004–2016: Fullerton Rangers
- 2016: Deportivo Coras USA
- 2016–2019: Santiago Canyon Hawks
- 2019–2022: Chattanooga Red Wolves
- * Club domestic league appearances and goals

Jimmy Obleda (born July 21, 1972) is an American professional football manager and former player who was most recently the head coach of USL League One soccer club Chattanooga Red Wolves.

== Playing career ==
Obleda signed his first professional contract with Danubio at the age of 17. His professional career continued for eight years, where he played for Cerro, Liverpool Montevideo, Irapuato, Ponnistus and back in the United States with Fort Lauderdale Strikers. He was also invited to the MLS Combine in 1995.

== Managerial career ==
Obleda spent almost 12 years coaching Super Y League team Fullerton Rangers in California. In 2011, he was named NSCAA Youth National Coach of the Year.

He spent three months of 2016 with NPSL side Deportivo Coras USA, before becoming head coach at Santiago Canyon College alongside been Director of Coaching at Boca Orange County.

On November 21, 2019, Obleda was named head coach of USL League One side Chattanooga Red Wolves. During the 2021 season, he reached the semifinals, achieving a record of 15 unbeaten matches, the longest unbeaten streak in USL League One history, and also set the record for most goals scored in a match with a 7–1 victory over Charlotte Independence.

On July 22, 2022, Obleda was placed on a provisional suspension pending the results of an investigation into allegations of misconduct brought forth by the USL Players Association. The United Soccer League Players Association lost confidence in the Chattanooga Red Wolves handling of the investigation, and filed a report with the U.S. Center for SafeSport asking them to investigate.
