= George Acosta =

American soccer player

Personal information
- Full name: George Anthony Acosta
- Date of birth: January 19, 2000 (age 26)
- Place of birth: Miami, Florida, U.S.
- Height: 1.75 m (5 ft 9 in)
- Position: Attacking midfielder

Youth career
- 2017–2018: Weston FC
- 2018–2019: Boca Juniors

Senior career*
Years	Team	Apps	(Gls)
2017	North Carolina FC U23	3	(1)
2019	Austin Bold	5	(0)
2020–2022	Inter Miami	1	(0)
2021–2022	→ Inter Miami II (loan)	30	(5)
2023	Cortuluá	1	(0)

International career
2016–2017	United States U17	24	(5)
2017	United States U20		
- * Club domestic league appearances and goals

George Anthony Acosta (born January 19, 2000) is an American former professional soccer player who played as an attacking midfielder.

== Club career ==
A Miami native, Acosta played for the Weston Academy and for the North Carolina FC U23s right before heading to Argentina signing with Boca Juniors, following his performance at the 2017 FIFA U-17 World Cup. In the South American country, he played for the Boca Juniors U20 and reserve teams. On August 28, 2019, Acosta signed with Austin Bold FC of the USL Championship. On September 1, 2019, he made his professional debut when he replaced Kris Tyrpak in the 82nd minute of the 3–0 win against Rio Grande Valley FC Toros.

Acosta joined Major League Soccer expansion side Inter Miam ahead of their inaugural season in 2020. Following the 2021 season, Acosta's contract option was declined by Miami.

On January 13, 2022, Acosta re-signed with Inter Miami. Acosta's contract option was declined by Miami following the 2022 season.

== International career ==
Acosta represented the United States in the 2017 FIFA U-17 World Cup. At the tournament, he played two of the five matches the Americans played at the World Cup, and scored a goal in the match against Colombia.

== Personal life ==
Born in the United States, Acosta is of Colombian descent through his father.
