= Conor Doyle =

American soccer player

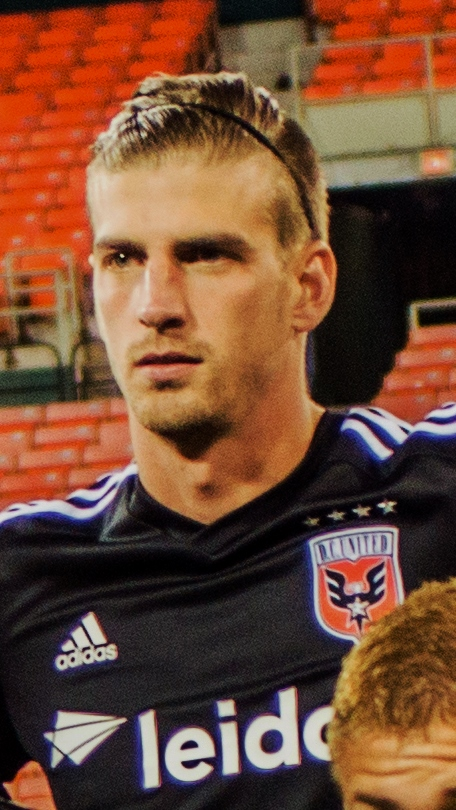
- Doyle playing for DC United in 2015

Personal information
- Full name: Conor Joseph Doyle
- Date of birth: October 13, 1991 (age 35)
- Place of birth: McKinney, Texas, United States
- Height: 6 ft 2 in (1.88 m)
- Positions: Midfielder; winger; forward

Youth career
- 2008–2009: Dallas Texans

College career
Years	Team	Apps	(Gls)
2010	Creighton Bluejays	7	(3)

Senior career*
Years	Team	Apps	(Gls)
2010–2013	Derby County	22	(0)
2013	→ D.C. United (loan)	14	(2)
2014–2015	D.C. United	42	(2)
2016	Colorado Rapids	3	(0)
2016	→ Colorado Springs Switchbacks (loan)	11	(1)
2017	Puerto Rico FC	28	(5)
2018	Jacksonville Armada	11	(3)
2019–2020	Chattanooga Red Wolves	40	(2)
2021–2023	Union Omaha	86	(2)
2024–2025	South Georgia Tormenta	43	(2)

International career
2010–2011	United States U20	6	(4)
2011	Republic of Ireland U21	1	(0)
2011	United States U23	1	(0)
- * Club domestic league appearances and goals as of November 1, 2025

Conor Joseph Doyle (born October 13, 1991) is an American professional soccer player.

== Career ==
=== Youth career ===
Doyle played his youth soccer with the Dallas Texans Soccer Club and McKinney Boyd High School, from which he graduated in December 2009 in order to enroll early at Creighton University, where he was scheduled to play college soccer for the Bluejays. He appeared in all seven spring exhibitions for the Bluejays in 2010, helping the team to a perfect 7–0–0 record.

=== Derby County ===
However, on August 6, 2010, he signed with Football League Championship club Derby County on a two-year contract before ever making an official appearance for Creighton. He had been discovered by a Derby scout in a tournament in the Summer of 2009 and had a three-day trial with the club. He impressed so was invited back for a three-week trial towards the end of his Spring 2010 semester. Doyle said later that "I felt like the trial I had with them went as good as it could possibly go." He was rewarded with a two-year contract worth, according to Doyle, $54,000 a year (approx. £34,000). He made his full debut as a second-half substitute in a 1–0 defeat away to Crewe Alexandra in the League Cup First Round on August 10, 2010. He made his first league appearance at home in the 2–1 defeat to Cardiff City on August 14, 2010, in the Championship. He started in The Rams' next game against Coventry City, being substituted in the 72nd minute for Tomasz Cywka. Doyle featured 14 times for the first team during the season, 5 times as a starter.

Despite normally playing as a forward, Derby manager Nigel Clough tried him in an unfamiliar holding midfield role during the 2011–12 preseason, with the side switching to a new 4-1-3-2 formation. Doyle featured 6 times in the 2011–12 season, with one start against Peterborough United on November 5, 2011. Doyle saw first team opportunities reduced due to the emergence of Mason Bennett and Callum Ball. Doyle was ruled out for four to six weeks due to a torn hamstring after picking up the injury in a reserve game in March 2012.

At the end of the 2011–12 season, it was announced by the club that Doyle would be retained by the club for the 2012–13 season. Clough said in an interview in July 2012 that he expected Doyle to impress this season, saying "This is the season where if he's going to do it, he's going to have to blossom." He also expected Doyle to feature more in matchday squads. However, Doyle only featured three times for the first team, with his last league appearance being in September. Doyle, though had his contract extended by a further year in May 2013 and he was made available for a loan move.

=== Major League Soccer (2013–2016) ===
==== D.C. United ====
In July 2013 Doyle was linked with Major League Soccer's Colorado Rapids for a six-month loan, however the MLS rules on player registrations complicated the move and he could join for the second half of the MLS season. On July 18, Doyle joined fellow rival MLS club D.C. United on a loan deal to the end of the 2013 MLS season, with an option to buy the player which lapses on December 1. Doyle made his debut on July 27 from the starting 11 against New England Revolution, being replaced after 66 minutes in a 2–1 loss. In Doyle's second match with United on August 3, he scored the game-winning goal over Montreal Impact from the bench – his first goal in senior football since the start of his career in 2010. Doyle played a part in United's 2013 Lamar Hunt U.S. Open Cup victory.

Doyle's move was made permanent following the 2013 season.

In the 2014 season, Doyle was primarily used as a reserve striker for United behind Fabian Espindola and Eddie Johnson, although he was often a first choice off the bench. On August 5, 2014, Doyle suffered a torn meniscus in his right knee during training. Doyle missed the remainder of the 2014 season.

Throughout 2015, Doyle returned to action with United where he was once again, usually a reserve striker. Doyle scored his first professional goal in nearly two years in a 3–1 win over Chicago Fire on June 3, 2015. Doyle scored again just three weeks later, once again against Chicago in a 1–0 away victory. Doyle hit a strike from roughly 35 yards out that many claim to be a goal of the year nominee. Towards the end of the 2015 season, Doyle became less of a reserve and more of a squad rotation player, where he shifted to more of a midfielder role. He last appeared for DC United on October 25, 2015, in a game against the Columbus Crew SC. He was subbed in the game and played 21 minutes in the 5–0 loss.

==== Colorado Rapids ====
On February 9, 2016, Doyle was traded to the Colorado Rapids in exchange for a third-round pick in the 2017 MLS SuperDraft. On July 20, 2016, it was announced Doyle would join the United Soccer League's club Colorado Springs Switchbacks FC on loan for the remainder of the 2016 season.

=== U.S. Lower Leagues (since 2017) ===
==== NASL (2017) and NPSL (2018) ====
On January 30, 2017, it was announced Doyle would be joining Puerto Rico FC in the North American Soccer League. Doyle moved to the Jacksonville Armada in the National Premier Soccer League for the 2018 season.

==== Chattanooga Red Wolves ====
On January 22, 2019, Doyle became the 16th signing of the Chattanooga Red Wolves SC to take part in both the team and USL League One's inaugural season.

==== Union Omaha ====
Doyle moved to USL League One side Union Omaha on 22 January 2021.

==== South Georgia Tormenta ====
On January 26, 2024, Doyle moved to South Georgia Tormenta on a two-year deal ahead of their 2024 season in the USL League One. On 18 December 2025, Doyle signed a contract extension keeping him until the end of the 2026 season. However, in February 2026, Tormenta would announce they were not fielding a team for next season. so Doyle was released.

== International career ==
Doyle was called up to the USA Under-20 squad for their training camp in mid December 2010. In January 2011, he was called up to the Republic of Ireland Under-21 squad to face Cyprus Under-21. International rules state Doyle can play for both Ireland and U.S.A below full senior level, and in February 2011 after his call-up by the Ireland Under-21's, Doyle revealed he was yet to make a final decision on which country he will represent.

Doyle was called up to the USA Under-20 squad for the 2011 CONCACAF U-20 Championship in March–April. Doyle scored twice in the competition as the USA were eliminated in the quarter-final stage.

In June 2011, Doyle committed his future to the United States. In November 2011, Doyle was called up to a training camp with the USA Under-23 squad, which took place at Duisburg, Germany from November 7–16, 2011.

== Career statistics ==
As of February 9, 2016

Club	Season	League			Cup		League Cup		Continental		Total	
Club	Season	Division	Apps	Goals	Apps	Goals	Apps	Goals	Apps	Goals	Apps	Goals
England			League		FA Cup		League Cup		Europe		Total	
Derby County	2010–11	Championship	14	0	0	0	0	0	—		14	0
Derby County	2011–12	Championship	6	0	0	0	0	0	—		6	0
Derby County	2012–13	Championship	2	0	1	0	0	0	—		3	0
United States			League		U.S. Open Cup		Playoffs		North America		Total	
D.C. United (loan)	2013	MLS	14	2	2	0	—		—		16	2
D.C. United	2014	MLS	17	0	1	0	0	0	—		18	0
D.C. United	2015	MLS	25	2	2	0	1	0	4	2	30	4
Colorado Rapids	2016	MLS	3	0	0	0	0	0	0	0	3	0
MLS Total			59	4	5	0	1	0	4	2	67	6
Colorado Springs Switchbacks	2016	USL PRO	10	1	0	0	1	0	0	0	11	1
Puerto Rico FC	2017	NASL	28	5	0	0	0	0	0	0	28	5
Jacksonville Armada	2018	NPSL	10	1	0	0	0	0	0	0	10	1
Chattanooga Red Wolves	2019	USL League One	18	2	1	0	0	0	0	0	19	2
U.S. Lower Leagues Total			66	9	1	0	1	0	0	0	68	9
Total	England		22	0	1	0	0	0	0	0	23	0
Total	United States		125	13	6	0	2	0	4	2	131	15
Career statistics			147	13	7	0	3	0	4	2	154	15

== Honors ==
=== Player ===
D.C. United

- Lamar Hunt U.S. Open Cup (1): 2013

== Personal life ==
Conor's Irish-born father, David, is a former indoor soccer player who played for the Kansas City Comets, Dallas Sidekicks, St. Louis Ambush, and Wichita Wings as a forward. As of July 2012, David is the current head soccer coach at Flower Mound High School in Flower Mound, Texas.
