= Leo Folla =

American soccer player

Personal information
- Full name: Leo Tamashiro Folla
- Date of birth: March 2, 1995 (age 31)
- Place of birth: New York, New York United States
- Height: 1.90 m (6 ft 3 in)
- Position: Defender

College career
Years	Team	Apps	(Gls)
2013	Iowa Western Reivers	4	(0)
2014	Albany Great Danes	12	(0)
2015–2017	St. Francis Brooklyn Terriers	53	(5)

Senior career*
Years	Team	Apps	(Gls)
2016–2017	F.A. Euro	26	(1)
2018	Härnösands FF	4	(1)
2018	F.A. Euro	12	(0)
2018	Lansdowne Yonkers		
2019–2020	Chattanooga Red Wolves	29	(0)
2021	FC Tulsa	9	(0)
2022–2023	Northern Colorado Hailstorm	45	(1)
2024	Chattanooga Red Wolves	28	(0)
2026	NY Renegades FC		
- * Club domestic league appearances and goals as of August 14, 2026

Leo Folla (born March 2, 1995) is an American soccer player. He is currently a free agent after playing for the Chattanooga Red Wolves SC in USL League One.

== Career ==
=== College and amateur ===
Folla started his college career at Iowa Western Community College in 2013 making 4 appearances. Folla had to leave early in the 2013 season due to personal issues.

In 2014, Folla transferred to the University at Albany making 12 appearances.

Following the 2014 season, Folla transferred to St. Francis College Brooklyn in 2015 and played 3 years with the Terriers winning two Northeast Conference regular seasons and conference championships in 2016 and 2017 respectively.

From 2016 to 2018, Folla played three seasons with FA EURO in USL League Two.

In 2026, Folla appeared with United Premier Soccer League side NY Renegades FC, helping the team reach the Spring 2026 National Finals.

=== Professional career ===
In February 2018, Folla signed with Härnösands FF and made 4 appearances scoring 1 goal. Folla stayed for a brief stint after having to return to the United States due to visa complications.

On January 9, 2019, Folla signed with USL League One Expansion side Chattanooga Red Wolves.

On January 27, 2021, Folla moved to USL Championship side FC Tulsa.

Folla made the move to USL League One club Northern Colorado Hailstorm ahead of their inaugural season.

Folla returned to his former club Chattanooga Red Wolves ahead of their 2024 season.

== Personal ==
Folla also holds Brazilian and Italian citizenship and was born and raised on Roosevelt Island. He is currently engaged and planning a wedding for 2026.
