= Jason Ramos =

American soccer player

Personal information
- Date of birth: October 9, 1998 (age 28)
- Place of birth: Montebello, California, United States
- Height: 1.93 m (6 ft 4 in)
- Position: Defender

College career
Years	Team	Apps	(Gls)
2016	Peninsula College		
2017	Mt. SAC Mounties	25	(2)
2018–2019	Cal Poly Pomona Broncos	42	(2)

Senior career*
Years	Team	Apps	(Gls)
2020–2021	Chattanooga Red Wolves	40	(2)
2022–2023	Minnesota United 2	24	(1)
2023	→ Forward Madison (loan)	5	(0)
2024	Central Valley Fuego	2	(0)
2025	Forward Madison	12	(0)
- * Club domestic league appearances and goals as of October 31, 2025

Jason Ramos (born October 9, 1998) is an American soccer player who plays as a defender.

== Career ==
=== Chattanooga Red Wolves ===
Following a closed tryout with the club, Ramos signed for Chattanooga in January 2020. He made his debut for the club on July 25, 2020, playing the entirety of a 2–2 away draw with Tormenta FC. At the end of the 2021 season, Ramos was named to the USL League One All-League First Team.

=== Minnesota United 2 ===
On February 8, 2022, Ramos signed with MLS Next Pro side Minnesota United 2 ahead of their inaugural season. He made his competitive debut for the club on March 26, 2022, coming on as a late substitute for Callum Montgomery in a 3–1 defeat to North Texas SC. After making 19 appearances for the club during the 2022 season, he returned to the team in 2023.

=== Forward Madison ===
On September 13, 2023, Ramos was sent on loan to Forward Madison for the remainder of their season.

=== Central Valley Fuego ===
Ramos signed with Central Valley Fuego prior to the 2024 season. Ramos would make only three appearances with Fuego before suffering a season-ending injury.

=== Return to Forward Madison ===
Ramos signed a 25-day contract with Forward Madison at the end of July 2025.

== Personal life ==
Ramos was born to a Mexican father and a Honduran mother. His favorite player is Sergio Ramos.
