= CHI Memorial Stadium =

Stadium in East Ridge, Tennessee, US

- Location in Tennessee Location in the United States
- Location: East Ridge, Tennessee
- Coordinates: 34°59′55″N 85°12′41″W
- Owner: Bob Martino
- Capacity: 6,000
- Surface: Natural grass

Construction
- Groundbreaking: July 9, 2019; 7 years ago
- Opened: August 1, 2020
- Cost: $60 million
- Architect: Star Community Builders

Tenants
- Chattanooga Red Wolves SC (USL1) (2020–present); Chattanooga Lady Red Wolves SC (WPSL) (2020–present); Dalton Red Wolves (USL2) (2020–present)

CHI Memorial Stadium is a 6,000 seat soccer-specific stadium in East Ridge, Tennessee. It was the first soccer specific stadium in Tennessee. It serves as the home stadium for Chattanooga Red Wolves SC of USL League One, Chattanooga Lady Red Wolves SC of the Women's Premier Soccer League, and Dalton Red Wolves SC of USL League Two.

The stadium opened on August 1, 2020, for the Red Wolves' match against FC Tucson.

== History ==
CHI Memorial Stadium was approved by the City of East Ridge, Tennessee, on June 27, 2019, as part of a $125 million development near Landsdale Park. The stadium broke ground on July 9, 2019, in hopes of being ready for the start of the 2020 USL League One season.

On December 17, 2019, the Red Wolves announced that the stadium would host their home opener of the 2020 season. Naming rights were awarded to CHI Memorial Hospital in Chattanooga and announced on March 5, 2020.

The stadium was originally scheduled to open on April 25, 2020, for the Red Wolves' match against Richmond Kickers, but was postponed due to the COVID-19 pandemic. Instead, the stadium opened on August 1, 2020, for the Red Wolves' match against FC Tucson.

In 2023 and 2024, the stadium will be the site for the semifinal and championship matches of both the NCAA Division II Men's Soccer Championship and the NCAA Division II Women's Soccer Championship.
