= Josue Soto =

American soccer player

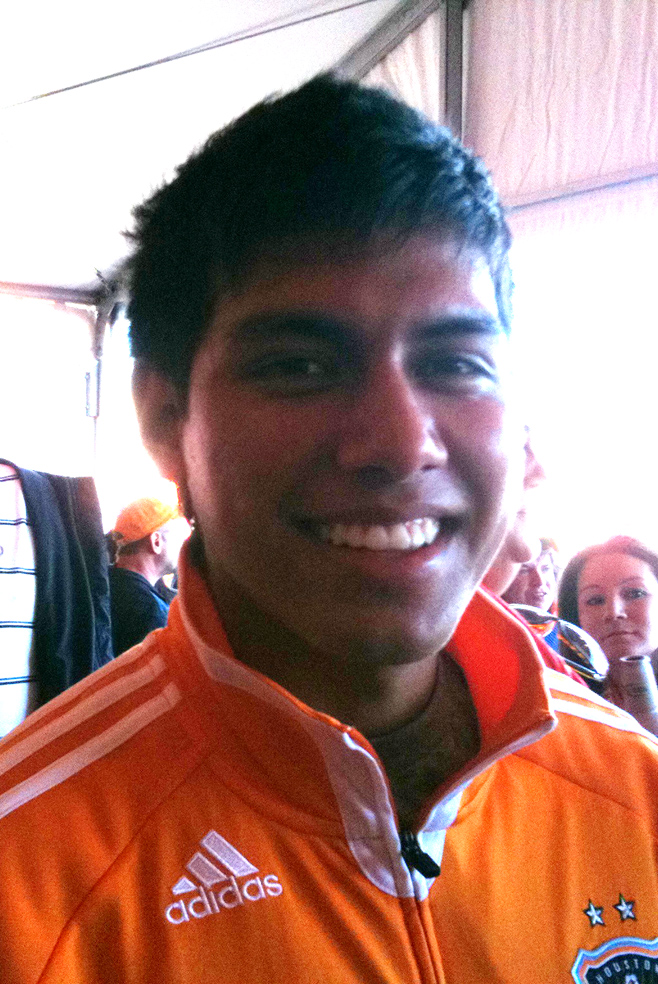
- Soto in 2011

Personal information
- Date of birth: January 3, 1989 (age 37)
- Place of birth: Fort Worth, Texas, United States
- Height: 1.75 m (5 ft 9 in)
- Position: Midfielder

Youth career
- 2007: Houston Dynamo

College career
| Years | Team | Apps | (Gls) |
| 2007–2008 | Campbell Fighting Camels | 40 | (14) |
| 2009–2010 | SMU Mustangs | 34 | (9) |

Senior career*
| Years | Team | Apps | (Gls) |
| 2008 | Carolina Dynamo | 6 | (0) |
| 2011–2012 | Houston Dynamo | 0 | (0) |
| 2012 | → San Antonio Scorpions (loan) | 25 | (2) |
| 2013 | Chivas USA | 18 | (0) |
| 2014–2015 | San Antonio Scorpions | 39 | (1) |
| 2016 | FF Jaro | 16 | (1) |
| 2017–2018 | AC Oulu | 30 | (2) |
| 2019–2020 | Chattanooga Red Wolves | 41 | (1) |
| 2021 | Rio Grande Valley | 4 | (0) |
| 2022 | Tormenta FC | 15 | (0) |
- * Club domestic league appearances and goals as of October 16, 2022

Josue Soto (born January 3, 1989) is an American professional soccer player who plays as a midfielder.

== Career ==
=== Academy ===
Soto trained with the Houston Dynamo first team in the summers of 2008 and 2010, but he missed 2009 due to injury. He led the Dynamo Academy to the final of 2007 Dallas Cup, where the team lost in a penalty shootout. Soto was the second player to sign with the Dynamo Academy in its first month of existence, and he was announced on January 29, 2007, as one of two permitted players not residing in Dynamo's home territory. He stayed with his brother in Houston while training and competing with the academy.

=== College and amateur ===
Soto split his collegiate career between Campbell in 2007-08 and Southern Methodist University in 2009–10.

In 2007, Soto helped Campbell win Atlantic Sun Conference Tournament and advance to the NCAA tournament as a true freshman. He was named Atlantic Sun Conference Freshman of the Year, first team all-Atlantic Sun, and to Atlantic Sun all-freshman team. Soto was also named to all-South region third team by NSCAA and a second team freshman all-America by College Soccer News. He started all 22 games and notched eight goals and six assists, ranking in top five in conference in six different categories. Soto earned MVP honors at the Richmond Challenge Cup. He also scored opening penalty kick in 5-4 championship game shootout win over Jacksonville after 1–1 tie. Soto led Campbell with five of 12 shots in 2-0 NCAA tournament loss at No. 20 ranked Furman.

In 2008, he led Campbell and the Atlantic Sun Conference with 11 assists in 18 games. He ranked fourth nationally with 0.61 assists per game. Soto scored a goal and added two assists against Belmont in the Atlantic Sun semifinals, Campbell's school-record 12th consecutive win. He scored a penalty kick goal and had two assists in Atlantic Sun Conference championship game against Jacksonville, but Campbell fell to a 4–3 defeat and failed to make the NCAA tournament.

The following year, he overcame pre-season injury to appear in 14 games with two goals and three assists in his first season at SMU after transferring from Campbell.

In 2010, Soto was named a second team NSCAA all-Midwest region and second team all-Conference USA while leading SMU to NCAA quarterfinals. He led Mustangs with seven assists and scored seven goals, including a team-high four game-winners. Soto scored opening penalty kick in shootout win against Creighton in NCAA tournament second round. He had a shot from the top of the penalty area in the 11th minute to give SMU a 1–0 win over William & Mary in the third round. However, the Mustangs lost to No. 4 nationally ranked seed North Carolina in shootout in the NCAA quarterfinals.

Soto also played for Carolina Dynamo in the USL Premier Development League.

=== Professional ===
On January 19, 2011, Soto signed with Houston Dynamo as the club's third homegrown player. As a rookie, Soto did not appear in a competitive match. In the US Open Cup, he did not appear either. He made his first professional appearance with first team as a substitute in 2-0 Dynamo Charities Cup loss vs. Bolton Wanderers on July 20, 2011. He also came on as a substitute in a 3-0 friendly win on September 4 against Monterrey, the club he grew up cheering for. As a reserve, he was one of two players to start all 10 matches for Dynamo Reserves, mostly in midfield but also at left back, contributing two assists. Soto had both assists with pinpoint delivery in 3–2 loss against FC Dallas on May 29, 2011.

On April 5, 2012, Soto joined NASL club San Antonio Scorpions on a month-long loan. Two days later, he made his professional debut in the club's inaugural match against the Atlanta Silverbacks which ended in a 0–0 draw. Soto was released in early 2013 by Houston.

On February 27, 2013, Chivas USA announced that Soto and Emilio Orozco had joined the club after impressing during a pre-season trial. He was released following the season.

Soto signed with NASL side San Antonio Scorpions on March 20, 2014. He re-signed with the club on January 9, 2015. San Antonio ceased operations in December 2015.

=== International ===
He is a former United States youth international player. Soto attended United States under-18 national team camp in Carson, California.

== Statistics ==
| Club performance | | | League | | Cup | | Continental | | Total | |
| Season | Club | League | Apps | Goals | Apps | Goals | Apps | Goals | Apps | Goals |
| USA | | | League | | Open Cup | | CONCACAF Champions League | | Total | |
|---|---|---|---|---|---|---|---|---|---|---|
| 2008 | Carolina Dynamo | USL Premier Development League | 6 | 0 | — | | — | | 6 | 0 |
| 2011 | Houston Dynamo | Major League Soccer | 0 | 0 | 0 | 0 | — | | 0 | 0 |
| 2012 | Houston Dynamo | Major League Soccer | 0 | 0 | 1 | 0 | 1 | 0 | 2 | 0 |
| 2012 | San Antonio Scorpions (loan) | North American Soccer League | 25 | 2 | 0 | 0 | — | | 25 | 2 |
| 2013 | Chivas USA | Major League Soccer | 18 | 0 | 2 | 0 | — | | 20 | 0 |
| 2014 | San Antonio Scorpions | North American Soccer League | 25 | 1 | 1 | 1 | — | | 26 | 2 |
| 2015 | San Antonio Scorpions | North American Soccer League | 14 | 0 | 1 | 0 | — | | 15 | 0 |
| Finland | | | League | | Suomen Cup | | | | Total | |
| 2016 | FF Jaro | Ykkösliiga | 16 | 1 | 2 | 1 | — | | 18 | 2 |
| 2017 | AC Oulu | Ykkösliiga | 11 | 1 | 0 | 0 | — | | 11 | 1 |
| 2018 | AC Oulu | Ykkösliiga | 19 | 1 | 6 | 1 | — | | 25 | 2 |
| USA | | | League | | Open Cup | | | | Total | |
| 2019 | Chattanooga Red Wolves | USL League One | 26 | 1 | 1 | 0 | — | | 27 | 1 |
| 2020 | Chattanooga Red Wolves | USL League One | 15 | 0 | — | | — | | 15 | 0 |
| 2021 | Rio Grande Valley FC | USL Championship | 4 | 0 | — | | — | | 4 | 0 |
| 2022 | Tormenta FC | USL League One | 15 | 0 | 1 | 0 | — | | 16 | 0 |
| Career total | | | 194 | 7 | 15 | 3 | 1 | 0 | 210 | 10 |

== Honors ==
San Antonio Scorpions

- North American Soccer League: 2014

Tormenta FC

- USL League One: 2022

== Personal ==
Soto was born in Fort Worth, but moved to Monterrey, Mexico, at the age of one. His parents are Rogelio and Ruth Soto, and he has a brother named Daniel, a sister-in-law called Veronica and niece named Isabella and nephews named Lucas and Samuel who live in Katy, Texas. Soto led Prepa Tec Monterrey to the 2005 CONADEIP championship in Mexico. He has played with the ODP South Texas State and Region III teams since 2005. Soto was named MVP of the 2005 Lone Star Showcase while playing with the Region III ODP squad.
