= Joe Rice (soccer) =

American soccer player (born 1996)

Personal information
- Full name: Joseph Rice
- Date of birth: March 6, 1996 (age 30)
- Place of birth: Fairfax, Virginia, United States
- Height: 6 ft 4 in (1.93 m)
- Position: Goalkeeper

Team information
- Current team: Colorado Springs Switchbacks
- Number: 23

College career
Years	Team	Apps	(Gls)
2015–2018	VCU Rams	6	(0)

Senior career*
Years	Team	Apps	(Gls)
2015	Chesterfield United		
2016	Virginia Beach City	0	(0)
2018	Lionsbridge FC	12	(0)
2019	Richmond Kickers	3	(0)
2020–2021	New England Revolution II	29	(0)
2022	Loudoun United	5	(0)
2022	→ Detroit City (loan)	0	(0)
2023	Hartford Athletic	18	(0)
2024–	Colorado Springs Switchbacks	0	(0)
- * Club domestic league appearances and goals as of October 18, 2023

Joe Rice (born March 6, 1996) is an American professional soccer player who plays as a goalkeeper for Colorado Springs Switchbacks in the USL Championship.

== Career ==
Rice played college soccer at Virginia Commonwealth University between 2014 and 2018, where he spent a year redshirted and only made six appearances for the Rams.

While at college, Rice appeared in the National Premier Soccer League with Chesterfield United and Virginia Beach City, as well as with USL PDL side Lionsbridge FC.

On March 20, 2019, Rice signed a professional contract with USL League One side Richmond Kickers.

On March 3, 2020, Rice joined New England Revolution II ahead of the 2020 season.

Rice was not announced as a returning player for the club's 2022 season where they'd be competing in the newly formed MLS Next Pro.

On February 11, 2022, it was announced Rice has joined USL Championship side Loudoun United.

On September 9, 2022, Rice joined Detroit City on a loan for the remainder of the 2022 season.

Rice signed with Hartford Athletic on January 24, 2023.

Rice moved again, joining USL Championship side Colorado Springs Switchbacks ahead of their 2024 season.
