= Nicholas Amponsah =

Ghanaian footballer

Personal information
- Date of birth: 9 July 1997 (age 29)
- Place of birth: Fomena, Ghana
- Position: Defender

Senior career*
Years	Team	Apps	(Gls)
2017–2019	Montego Bay United	25	(4)
2019–2020	Chattanooga Red Wolves	18	(1)
- * Club domestic league appearances and goals as of 25 October 2020

Nicholas Amponsah (born 9 July 1997) is a Ghanaian footballer who plays as a defender.

== Career ==
Amponsah played for Jamaican club Montego Bay United before signing for the Chattanooga Red Wolves.
