= Chattanooga Christian School =

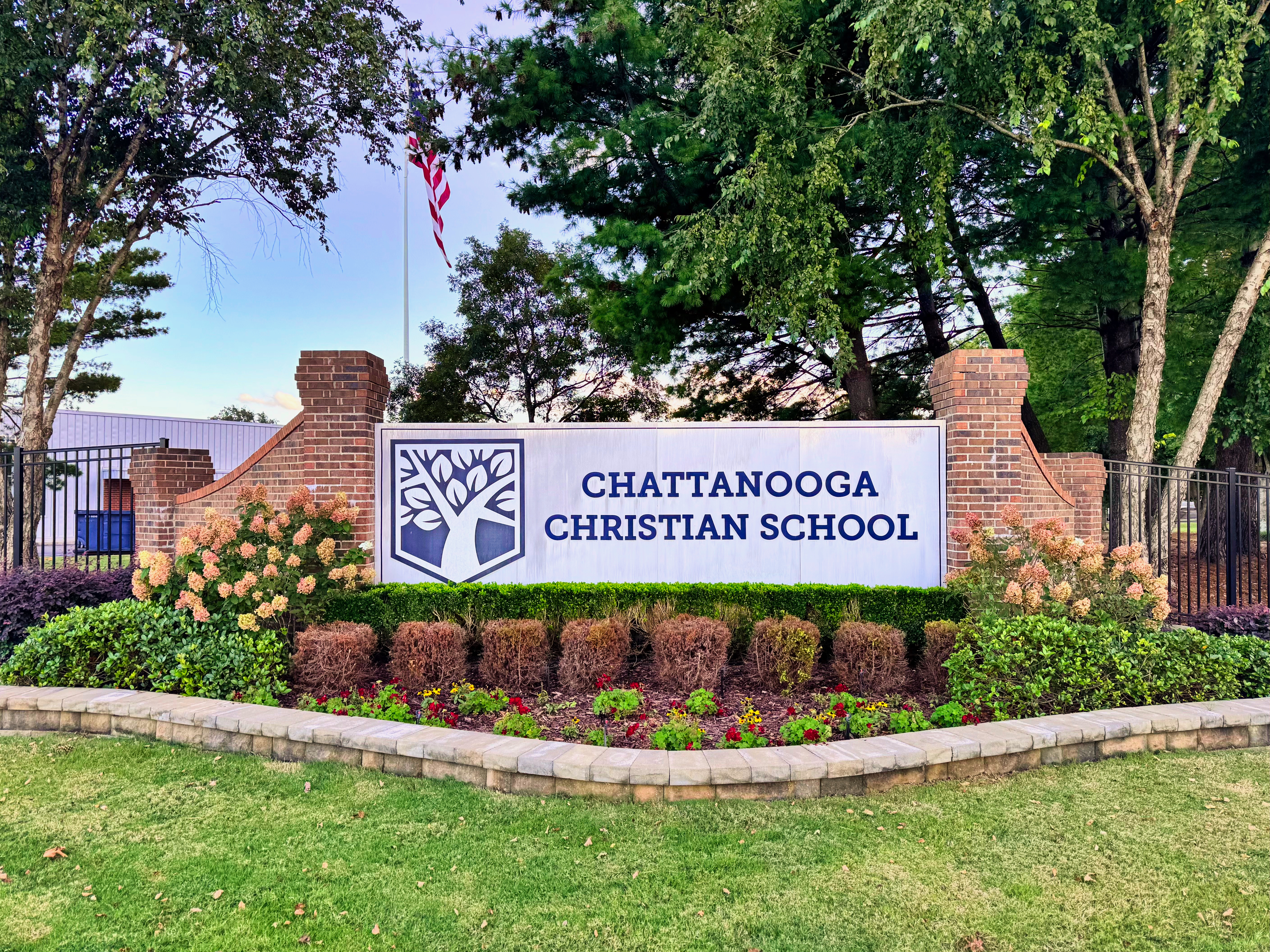

Location
- 3354 Charger Drive; Chattanooga, Tennessee 37409; United States; 35.014°N 85.322°W

Information
- School type: Private, coeducational, college preparatory
- Denomination: Nondenominational
- Established: 1970
- CEEB code: 431231
- President: Matt Covey
- Faculty: 157
- Grades: Pre-K-12
- Average class size: 115
- Student to teacher ratio: 18
- Campus: 40 acres (160,000 m^{2}), urban
- Colours: Navy and Gold
- Athletics: TSSAA AA
- Athletics conference: Appalachian Athletic Conference
- Mascot: Chargers
- Accreditation: Southern Association of Colleges and Schools
- Endowment: $10 million
- Affiliations: Christian Schools International
- Website: Chattanooga Christian School

Chattanooga Christian School (CCS) is a Christian, interdenominational coeducational day school located in Chattanooga, Tennessee. It is the largest private school in Hamilton County, Tennessee. Founded in 1970, the private college-preparatory school is currently located at the foot of Lookout Mountain on 55+ acres.

== History ==
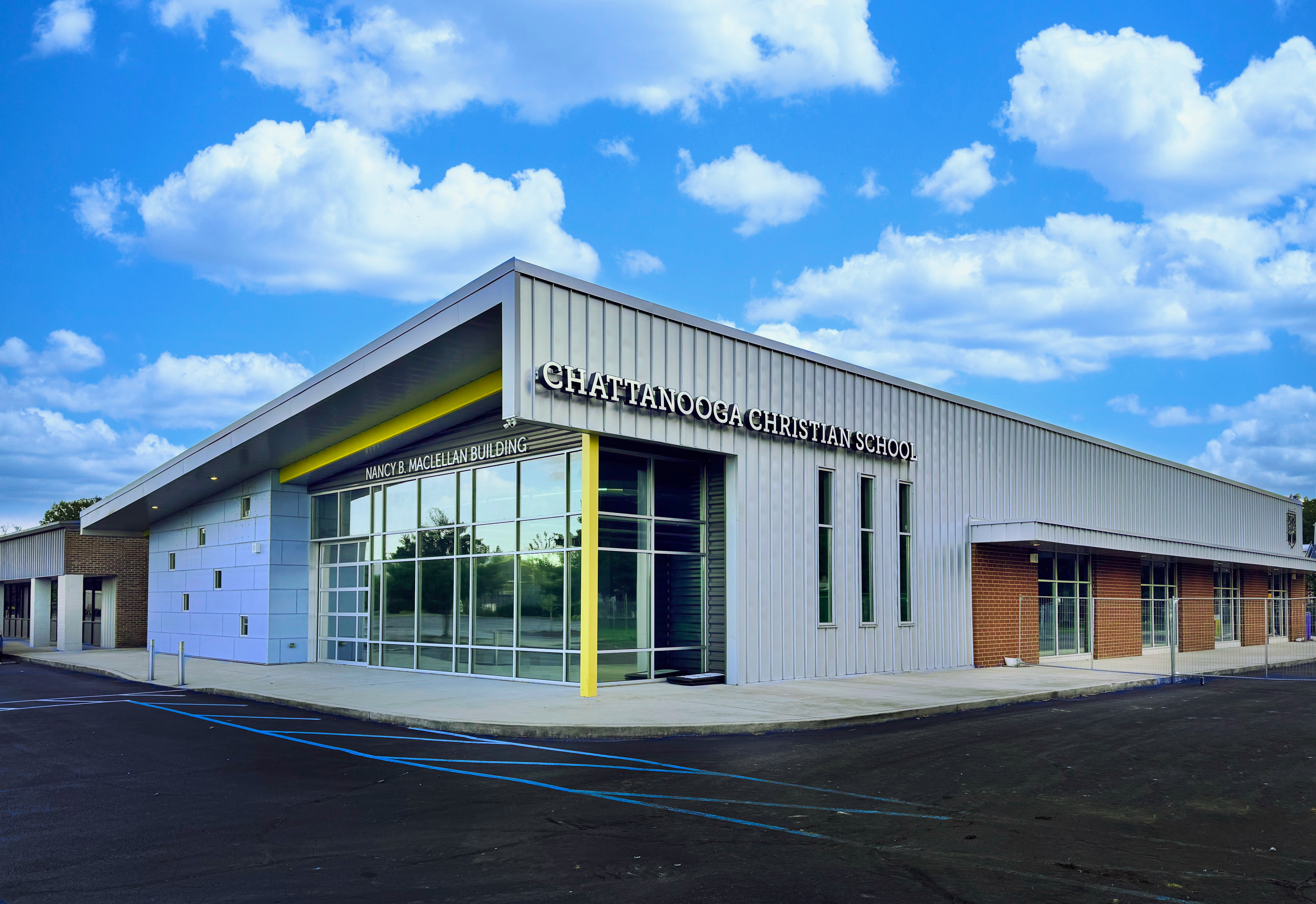
Chattanooga Christian School

The school was organized as Lookout Mountain Christian School Association on February 4, 1970, by a group of parents including World magazine founder Joel Belz. The school was incorporated as a Georgia non-profit Corporation on June 30, 1972. As the school grew and expanded to encompass more grade levels, a decision was made to move the school from Lookout Mountain to Chattanooga at its present location and change the name to Chattanooga Christian School, Inc. The move to the present campus was made in 1982. The school grew dramatically over the next 30 years. Chattanooga Christian School is a Christian, interdenominational, coeducational day school. It is a parent-directed school, working through an elected administrative Board of Directors, and accepts students in PreSchool through 12th grade. Chattanooga Christian School is a member of Christian Schools International and is accredited by The Southern Association of Colleges and Schools. Today, the campus on Charger Drive encompasses roughly 55 acres of land. It is the largest private school in Hamilton County, Tennessee.

== Campus ==
In 1982, the school moved to its present location, the former site of Ed Wright Chevrolet on South Broad Street. The initial 10-acre (40,000 m^{2}) site was expanded by additional purchases over the years to encompass 40 acres (160,000 m^{2}) and 6 buildings. The section of Broad Street in front of the school was renamed Charger Drive in early 2003.

=== Athletics ===
Chattanooga Christian School fields interscholastic teams in baseball, basketball, cheering, cross country, football, golf, soccer, softball, strength & conditioning, tennis, track and field, volleyball, and wrestling.

A multi-sport athletic facility was completed for the 2015-2016 school year called "The Powerhouse"

== Theater department ==
Chattanooga Christian High School has a large theater department. They put on a musical every fall and spring semester, the fall being the middle school musical and spring being high school. In the past they have done The Music Man, Bye Bye Birdie, The King and I, Beauty and the Beast and among other Broadway shows but more recently Mary Poppins, which was nominated for 20 Jewel Awards (a Jimmy Awards affiliate) and won 6.

== Notable alumni ==
- Ashley Harkleroad, tennis player
