= Ualefi =

Brazilian footballer (born 1994)

Personal information
- Full name: Ualefi Rodrigues dos Reis
- Date of birth: January 26, 1994 (age 32)
- Place of birth: São Paulo, Brazil
- Height: 1.73 m (5 ft 8 in)
- Position: Midfielder

Team information
- Current team: Chattanooga Red Wolves
- Number: 8

Youth career
- 2007–2012: Corinthians

Senior career*
Years	Team	Apps	(Gls)
2012–2013	Corinthians	0	(0)
2013	→ Flamengo (loan)	0	(0)
2016	Swope Park Rangers	30	(0)
2018	Barretos	18	(0)
2019–	Chattanooga Red Wolves	149	(3)

International career
2009	Brazil U15		
- * Club domestic league appearances and goals as of 31 October 2026

Ualefi Rodrigues dos Reis (born 26 January 1994) is a Brazilian footballer who plays for Chattanooga Red Wolves in USL League One.

== Career ==
Ualefi was with Corinthians from 2007 until 2013, also spending time on loan with Flamengo's academy side in 2013. He joined United Soccer League side Swope Park Rangers on 11 January 2016.

After a season in Brazil with Barretos, where he tallied 9 assists in 18 appearances, Ualefi returned to the United States on 13 December 2018, signing with USL League One side Chattanooga Red Wolves ahead of their inaugural season in 2019.

== Career statistics ==
=== Club ===
As of match played 27 October 2024

Appearances and goals by club, season and competition
Club	Season	League			State league		National cup (Note: Includes Copa do Brasil, U.S. Open Cup)		League cup (Note: Includes USL Cup)		Continental		Other		Total	
Club	Season	Division	Apps	Goals	Apps	Goals	Apps	Goals	Apps	Goals	Apps	Goals	Apps	Goals	Apps	Goals
Corinthians	2012	Série A	0	0	0	0	0	0	—		0	0	0	0	0	0
Swope Park Rangers	2016	USL	30	0	—		—		—		—		1 (Note: Appearance(s) in USL Play-offs)	0	31	0
Sporting Kansas City	2016	MLS	0	0	—		0	0	—		2 (Note: Appearance(s) in CONCACAF Champions Cup)	0	0	0	2	0
Barretos	2018	—			18 (Note: Appearance(s) in Campeonato Paulista Série A3)	0	—		—		—		—		18	0
Chattanooga Red Wolves	2019	USL League One	28	1	—		1	0	—		—		—		29	1
Chattanooga Red Wolves	2020	USL League One	11	1	—		—		—		—		—		11	1
Chattanooga Red Wolves	2021	USL League One	16	0	—		—		—		—		2 (Note: Appearance(s) in USL League One Playoffs)	0	18	0
Chattanooga Red Wolves	2022	USL League One	16	0	—		0	0	—		—		2	0	18	0
Chattanooga Red Wolves	2023	USL League One	30	0	—		1	0	—		—		—		31	0
Chattanooga Red Wolves	2024	USL League One	19	0	—		2	0	7	0	—		—		28	0
Chattanooga Red Wolves	Total		120	2	—		4	0	7	0	0	0	4	0	135	2
Career total			150	2	18	0	4	0	7	0	2	0	5	0	186	2
