= CommonSpirit Memorial Hospital Chattanooga =

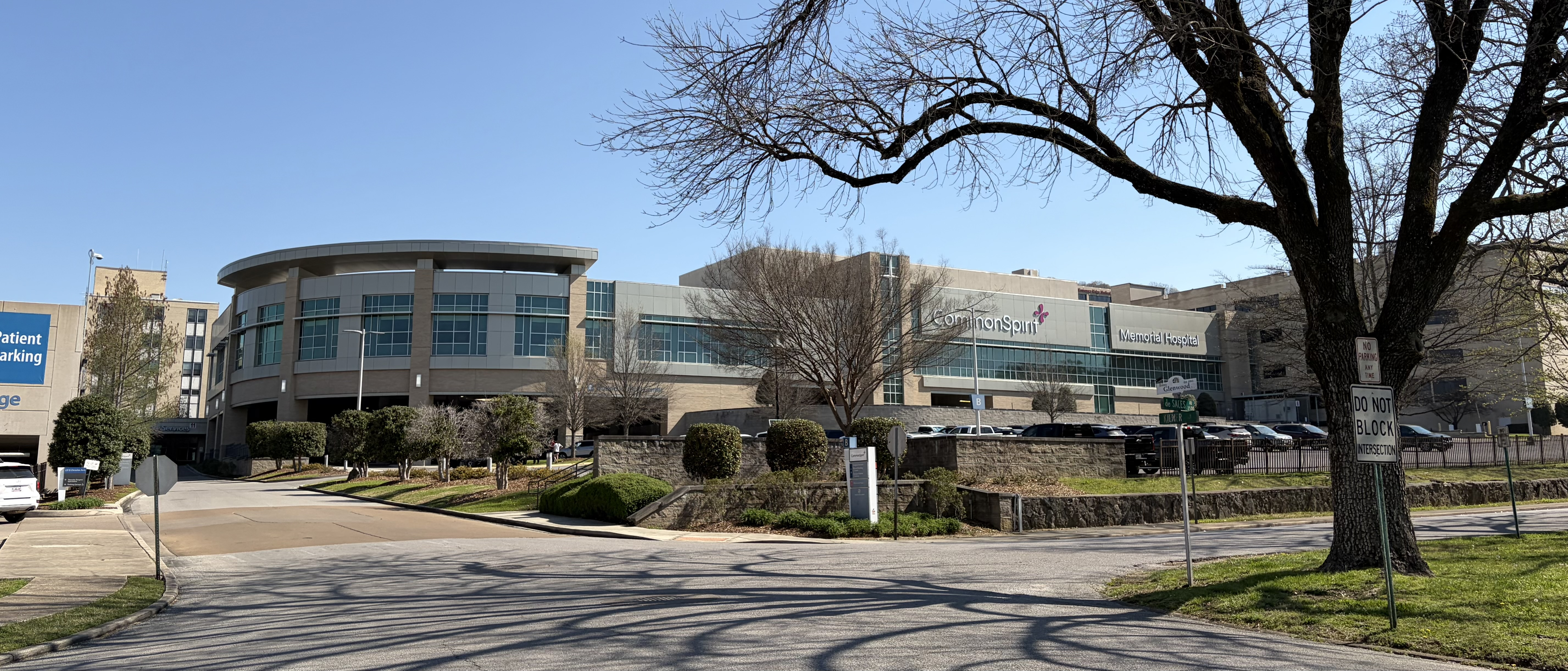
- CommonSpirit Memorial Hospital in 2026

Geography
- Location: Chattanooga, Tennessee, United States
- Coordinates: 35.0413°N 85.2604°W

Organisation
- Religious affiliation: Roman Catholic
- Network: CommonSpirit Health

History
- Founded: January 2, 1952

Links
- Website: www.memorial.org

CommonSpirit Memorial Hospital Chattanooga, formerly known as Memorial Hospital, is a hospital located in Chattanooga, Tennessee. It was officially opened on January 2, 1952. It is a member of The American Hospital Association, The Tennessee Hospital Association, The Catholic Hospital Association, The Chattanooga Area Hospital Council, and The Chattanooga Area Safety Council. Memorial Hospital has grown tremendously since 1952. In 1952, Memorial Hospital had 200 beds. Today, the hospital has 365 hospital beds. It has nearly doubled in size over the 62 years since it opened. Memorial is a general hospital that has a wide variety of specialties. They have surgical, cardiac, interventional, cancer, orthopedic, and general care services. Memorial is known as a leader in Cardiology. Memorial is not a teaching hospital but is a leader in new technology.

== History ==
The Hamilton County Memorial Hospital Association was started in June 1946. Its only goal was to build a nonprofit hospital. Scott Probasco a local banker donated to the construction of the hospital and he was also involved in the expansion of Erlanger. After the construction of the hospital, it would be run by the Sisters of Charity of Nazareth. The Sisters of Charity helped Chattanooga raise the 1,570,000 dollars by mortgaging their own land in Kentucky. Paul Kruesi, an outspoken citizen in Chattanooga at the time made a statement that, "if Knoxville could raise 2.5 million dollars for a new hospital then chattanooga can raise 2 million." Ground was broke for construction on April 1, 1949. After construction was done and all hospital equipment was added, the cash and donations totaled nearly 2,000,000 dollars. In 1951, Sister Mary Victoria was named administrator of the hospital and the hospital was dedicated to "the glory of God and the service of mankind". When the hospital opened in 1952, they employed less than 40 physicians. This number grew to 250 in only ten years. The plans were announced in 1963 to add a seven-story addition on the south side of the hospital. This addition increased the hospital size by one third. It would have a larger laboratory and delivery room, as well as more operating and recovery rooms. Again in 1969, the hospital was in need of an expansion. They added on 33 beds, and then they planned to build the building that we know of today. Today, the DeSales Harrison building has been constructed so that the hospital can keep expanding with not much effort. In Spring of 2011, Memorial Hospital broke ground for a 380,000,000 dollar expansion project. This expansion was put off for two year due to the economy being rough. Now with the United States still in a recession the expansion is still in construction after three years and is expected to be a great benefit to the hospital and to the many more patients that will be treated in the new additions.

In 2019, Memorial Hospital's parent Catholic Health Initiatives merged with Dignity Health to form CommonSpirit Health. Memorial Hospital was rebranded with the CommonSpirit name in 2025.

== Awards and recognition ==
On February 25, 2013, Memorial Hospital received the Platinum Performance Achievement Award from the American College of Cardiology Foundation for their outstanding services in 2012.
