= Luca Mayr-Fälten =

Austrian footballer

Personal information
- Full name: Luca Mayr-Fälten
- Date of birth: 6 April 1996 (age 30)
- Place of birth: Steyr, Austria
- Height: 5 ft 9 in (1.75 m)
- Position: Midfielder

Team information
- Current team: Vorwärts Steyr

Youth career
- –2010: SK Amateure Steyr
- 2010–2013: SV Ried

College career
Years	Team	Apps	(Gls)
2016–2019	South Carolina Gamecocks	64	(15)

Senior career*
Years	Team	Apps	(Gls)
2013–2016	SV Ried	1	(0)
2013–2016	SV Ried II	68	(21)
2018	Michigan Bucks	2	(0)
2019	South Georgia Tormenta FC 2	16	(8)
2020–2021	South Georgia Tormenta	41	(8)
2022–	Vorwärts Steyr	0	(0)

International career
2012–2013	Austria U17	17	(3)
2014	Austria U18	1	(1)
2014	Austria U19	1	(0)
- * Club domestic league appearances and goals as of 21 December 2021

Luca Mayr-Fälten (born 6 April 1996) is an Austrian footballer who plays for SK Vorwärts Steyr.

After playing for six years in the United States, Mayr-Fälten signed a contract on 22 December 2021 to return to his hometown and play professionally for Vorwärts Steyr.
