= Chattanooga Red Wolves SC =

American professional soccer club

Chattanooga Red Wolves
- Full name: Chattanooga Red Wolves Soccer Club
- Nickname: Red Wolves
- Founded: August 1, 2018; 8 years ago
- Stadium: CHI Memorial Stadium
- Capacity: 5,500
- Owner: Robert Martino
- General Manager: Patrick Mashburn
- Head coach: Scott Mackenzie
- League: USL League One
- 2025: USL League One, 2nd of 14; Playoffs: Quarter-finals
- Website: chattanoogaredwolves-sc.com
| Home colors | Away colors |

Chattanooga Red Wolves SC is an American professional soccer club based in Chattanooga, Tennessee. They are a founding member of USL League One in the third division of American men's soccer. The club was announced as a member of USL League One on August 1, 2018. The Red Wolves play their home games at CHI Memorial Stadium, Tennessee's first professional soccer-specific stadium. The club also fields three pre-professional teams: the Chattanooga Lady Red Wolves in the USL W League, and the Dalton Red Wolves and Park City Red Wolves in USL League Two.

== History ==
On August 1, 2018, the United Soccer League announced that Chattanooga would be granted a franchise to play in their newly created third division, later named USL League One, beginning in 2019. An existing team, Chattanooga FC, had significantly higher attendance than other minor league teams with several matches over 10,000 spectators since they were established in 2009. They later accused the new USL franchise of attempting a takeover of the Chattanooga market and their home venue, Finley Stadium, after the team had declined to submit a bid in the new league.

The USL team announced their first head coach, Tim Hankinson. The club then officially announced their name, Chattanooga Red Wolves SC, on September 25, 2018. On November 21, 2019, the Red Wolves announced Jimmy Obleda as their new head coach and technical director.

During the 2021 USL League One Season, Chattanooga set the USL League One Record for longest undefeated streak at 15 matches. The team finished the season in third place with 44 points and a 11-11-6 record. Chattanooga proceeded to defeat North Texas SC in the USL League One Quarterfinals before falling to Greenville Triumph in extra time in the Semifinals.

During the 2022 USL League One Season, Chattanooga broke the USL League One Record for most goals in a game after dismantling Charlotte Independence 7–1. The result also broke the record for the most goals scored in a single match in the 44-year history of professional soccer in Tennessee. The Red Wolves topped the 42-year-old record of six goals scored in a single match by the North American Soccer League's Memphis Rogues in 1980.

On July 22, 2022, coach Obleda was placed on a provisional suspension pending the results of an investigation into allegations of misconduct brought forth by the USL Players Association. The United Soccer League Players Association lost confidence in the Chattanooga Red Wolves handling of the investigation, and filed a report with the U.S. Center for SafeSport asking them to investigate. 2022 saw Chattanooga make its deepest playoff run yet. Chattanooga advanced to the Semifinals of the USL League One Playoffs for the second consecutive season, downing defending champion Union Omaha 1–0 after extra time in front of a packed CHI Memorial Stadium. They then went on to beat the USL League One Regular Season Champions Richmond Kickers on the road 1–0, putting Chattanooga in its first ever final. Chattanooga then took on South Georgia Tormenta in the 2022 USL League One Final but ultimately fell short losing 1–2.

On December 14, 2022, the Red Wolves announced Jeff "Ziggy" Korytowski as their new head coach

On July 31, 2023, Scott Mackenzie was named interim head coach after previous interim head coach Jimmy Weekley had a "recent significant health situation" and was placed on a "medical leave of absence." On October 5, 2023, Scott Mackenzie was named full-time head coach and technical director, removing his interim tag.

On April 2, 2025, the first Chattanooga derby was held against Chattanooga FC, in the second round of the Open Cup hosted at Finley Stadium, Chattanooga. The game finished 1–1 after extra time with the Red Wolves winning on penalties. The game had an attendance of 12,131, the second-highest for a second round match in U.S. Open Cup history. The Red Wolves were eventually knocked out in the fourth round to MLS side Nashville SC, who eventually won the entire tournament, 1–0 at Geodis Park.

== Club identity ==
In 2019, the Red Wolves' trademark application was opposed by Arkansas State University. On September 18, 2023, the USPTO Trademark Trial and Appeal Board ruled in favor of Arkansas State University and sustained their opposition.

== Lady Red Wolves ==
In 2019, the Chattanooga Lady Red Wolves won the WPSL Southeastern Conference Title. After the WPSL Southeastern Conference went on hiatus for the 2020 season due to COVID-19, the Chattanooga Lady Red Wolves went on to repeat a WPSL Southeastern Conference Champions in 2021. On June 8, 2021, CRWSC announced that the Lady Red Wolves would join the newly created USL W League as a founding member and begin play in 2022.

== Ownership ==
Utah businessman Robert "Bob" Martino, a real estate developer and construction company owner, founded the Chattanooga Red Wolves Soccer Club in 2018. He financed the development of the state's first professional soccer stadium, CHI Memorial Stadium. Martino is also the owner of the Park City Red Wolves and the Dalton Red Wolves, both members of USL League Two.

== Stadium ==
On April 25, 2019, the club announced plans for a new soccer-specific stadium for the team in the Chattanooga suburb of East Ridge, Tennessee which will be part of a 100-acre, $125 million development including hotels, condominiums, apartments, retail shops, restaurants and convention space.

On March 5, 2020, the Red Wolves announced that CHI Memorial Hospital, a part of the Catholic Health Initiatives hospital system, would be the name sponsor for the stadium.

In spring of 2021, construction of the stadium's jumbotron was complete. The 33’ X 62’ screen features in-game scoring and statistics, live video feeds and instant replays. CHI Memorial Stadium’s Executive Club and Sky Suites building, which will include eight suites and a restaurant-bar, are currently under construction.

The 2024 season began with a new natural grass pitch after the synthetic turf was removed. This was part of a $2 million dollar investment into CHI Memorial Stadium.

== Players and staff ==
=== Current roster ===
As of September 10, 2026

Note: Flags indicate national team as defined under FIFA eligibility rules; some limited exceptions apply. Players may hold more than one non-FIFA nationality.

| No. | Pos. | Nation | Player |
|---|---|---|---|
| 1 | GK | USA | Jason Smith |
| 2 | DF | USA | Tobi Adewole |
| 4 | MF | ENG | James Vaughan |
| 5 | DF | ENG | Harry Jolley |
| 6 | MF | RSA | Wynand Wessels |
| 7 | MF | USA | Omar Hernández |
| 8 | MF | BRA | Ualefi |
| 9 | FW | USA | Greyson Mercer |
| 10 | FW | ENG | Matt Bentley |
| 11 | DF | VIR | Joshua Ramos |
| 12 | GK | GUA | Ricardo Jérez |
| 14 | FW | USA | Pedro Hernández |
| 15 | MF | USA | Dyson Clapier |
| 16 | FW | USA | Brandon McManus |
| 17 | MF | USA | Omar Gómez |
| 19 | MF | USA | Nathan Donoho |

| No. | Pos. | Nation | Player |
|---|---|---|---|
| 20 | FW | GHA | Ropapa Mensah |
| 21 | MF | USA | Matthew Acosta |
| 22 | DF | USA | Eric Kinzner |
| 23 | DF | ESP | Yanis Lelin |
| 24 | MF | USA | Roberto Apolinar |
| 27 | MF | USA | Jesse Maldonado |
| 30 | DF | ARG | Aaron Lombardi |
| 33 | DF | GHA | Jordan Ayimbila |
| 35 | MF | HON | Angelo Kelly-Rosales |
| 36 | MF | USA | Alexis Plaza-Soto |
| 40 | DF | USA | Christian Engmann |
| 45 | MF | USA | Tristan Torres Aguayo |
| 47 | MF | USA | Riley Binns |
| 52 | MF | USA | Josh Hallenberger |
| 66 | MF | USA | Michael Knapp |
| 68 | GK | USA | Austin Montoya |

=== Technical staff ===
| Position | Name |
|---|---|
| Head coach & Technical Director | (Scotland) Scott MacKenzie |
| Assistant coach & Head of Scouting | (United States) Luke Winter |
| Assistant coach & Academy Sporting Director | (United States) Luke Winter |
| Goalkeeping coach | (Guatemala) Ricardo Jérez |

== Statistics and records ==
=== Season-by-season ===
As of November 2, 2025

| Season | USL League One | | | | | | | | Playoffs | U.S. Open Cup | | | | North America | Top Scorer | |
| Season | P | W | D | L | GF | GA | Pts | Position | Playoffs | P | W | L | R | North America | Player | Goals |
|---|---|---|---|---|---|---|---|---|---|---|---|---|---|---|---|---|
| 2019 | 28 | 10 | 10 | 8 | 35 | 37 | 40 | 5th | did not qualify | 1 | 0 | 1 | 1st | — | (Republic of Ireland) Steven Beattie | 9 |
| 2020 | 15 | 6 | 4 | 5 | 21 | 17 | 22 | 5th | did not qualify | Cancelled | | | | — | (Scotland) Greg Hurst | 8 |
| 2021 | 28 | 11 | 11 | 6 | 37 | 29 | 44 | 3rd | Semi-finals | Cancelled | | | | — | (Colombia) Juan Galindrez | 10 |
| 2022 | 30 | 12 | 7 | 11 | 52 | 39 | 43 | 4th | 2nd | 1 | 0 | 1 | 2nd | — | (Colombia) Juan Galindrez | 13 |
| 2023 | 32 | 8 | 7 | 17 | 46 | 65 | 31 | 10th | did not qualify | 1 | 0 | 1 | 2nd | — | (Jamaica) Chevone Marsh (Ghana) Ropapa Mensah | 12 |
| 2024 | 22 | 5 | 3 | 14 | 28 | 48 | 18 | 11th | did not qualify | 3 | 2 | 1 | 3rd | — | (Ghana) Ropapa Mensah | 9 |
| 2025 | 30 | 15 | 10 | 5 | 42 | 31 | 55 | 2nd | Quarter-finals | 4 | 3 | 1 | R32 | — | (United States) Pedro Hernández | 10 |
| Total | 185 | 67 | 52 | 66 | 261 | 266 | 253 | - | | 10 | 5 | 5 | - | | | |

=== Head coach records ===
- Includes USL Regular Season, USL Playoffs, U.S. Open Cup. Excludes friendlies.

As of October 14, 2022

| Name | Nationality | From | To | P | W | D | L | GF | GA | Win% |
|---|---|---|---|---|---|---|---|---|---|---|
| Tim Hankinson | United States | September 11, 2018 | November 20, 2019 | 29 | 10 | 11 | 8 | 35 | 40 | 34.48 |
| Jimmy Obleda | United States | November 21, 2019 | November 6, 2022 | 79 | 32 | 22 | 25 | 115 | 91 | 40.51 |
| Jeff Korytoski | United States | December 14, 2022 | June 20, 2023 | 13 | 3 | 2 | 8 | 11 | 23 | 23.08 |
| Jimmy Weekley | United States | June 20, 2023 | August 4, 2023 | 7 | 1 | 2 | 4 | 10 | 18 | 14.29 |
| Scott Mackenzie (interim) | England | August 4, 2023 | October 5, 2023 | 11 | 4 | 2 | 5 | 23 | 23 | 36.36 |
| Scott Mackenzie | England | October 5, 2023 | present | 2 | 0 | 1 | 1 | 3 | 5 | 0.00 |

== See also ==
- USL League One
- Chattanooga FC
