= 2022 Charlotte Independence season =

Charlotte Independence
2022 season
- Owner: Queen City Soccer Club, LLC
- Head coach: Mike Jeffries
- Stadium: American Legion Memorial Stadium
- USL1 Playoffs: TBD
- U.S. Open Cup: TBD
- Highest home attendance: 3,702 (5/15 vs. TUC)
- Lowest home attendance: 1,511 (7/29 vs. CV)
- Average home league attendance: 2,284
- Biggest win: CLT 6–2 MAD (6/26); CLT 4–0 CV (7/29); CLT 5–1 NC (10/15)
- Biggest defeat: CHA 7–1 CLT (6/22)
Home colors	Away colors

The 2022 Charlotte Independence season was the eighth season of the club's existence. This will be the club's first season in USL League One, a move the club announced in December 2021 after playing in USL Championship since 2019. It will be the club's first season in the third division of the American soccer pyramid since 2016. The club are coming off of a season that saw them finish 4th in the eastern conference, and advance to the conference semifinals

== Club ==
=== Roster ===
As of April 17, 2022

No.	Pos.	Nation	Player
1	GK	USA	Keegan Meyer
2	DF	USA	Koa Santos (on loan from Charlotte FC)
3	DF	VEN	Héctor Acosta
4	DF	USA	Diego Rocha
5	DF	TOG	Shalom Dutey
6	MF	SEN	Omar Ciss
7	MF	USA	Miguel Ibarra
8	MF	USA	Will Vint
9	FW	COL	Iván Luquetta
10	MF	VEN	Ayrton Páez
11	FW	COD	Tresor Mbuyu
15	DF	USA	Carson Talboys
16	DF	COL	Tomás Maya
17	DF	USA	Clay Dimick
19	MF	USA	Quinn McNeill (on loan from Charlotte FC)
21	MF	USA	Giuseppe Barone
25	MF	USA	Brayden Keenan
26	MF	USA	Noah Behermann
27	MF	USA	Jefferson Amaya
30	GK	USA	Adrian Zendejas (on loan from Charlotte FC)
31	GK	USA	Logan Bellina
90	FW	JAM	Khori Bennett

USL Academy Contract

== Competitions ==
=== Exhibitions ===
March 5, 2022 Preseason 1	UNC Charlotte	v	Charlotte Independence	Charlotte, North Carolina
				Stadium: Transamerica Field

March 12, 2022 Preseason 2	Charlotte Independence	v	Columbus Crew 2	Rock Hill, South Carolina
11:00 AM EST				Stadium: Manchester Meadows Soccer Complex

March 19, 2022 Preseason 3	Charlotte Independence	v	Greenville Triumph	Matthews, North Carolina
2:00 PM EST				Stadium: Sportsplex at Matthews

March 26, 2022 Preseason 4	Charlotte Independence	v	North Carolina FC	Matthews, North Carolina
2:00 PM EDT				Stadium: Sportsplex at Matthews

March 2, 2022 Preseason 5	Charlotte Independence	v	High Point University	Matthews, North Carolina
11:00 AM EDT				Stadium: Sportsplex at Matthews

=== USL League One ===
==== Standings ====
Pos	Team	Pld	W	L	T	GF	GA	GD	Pts	Qualification
4	Chattanooga Red Wolves SC	30	12	11	7	52	39	+13	43	Qualification for the play-offs
5	Union Omaha	30	10	7	13	34	33	+1	43	Qualification for the play-offs
6	Charlotte Independence	30	12	12	6	48	48	0	42	Qualification for the play-offs
7	Northern Colorado Hailstorm FC	30	11	10	9	42	38	+4	42	
8	Central Valley Fuego FC	30	11	12	7	37	40	−3	40	

Source: USL League One
Rules for classification: 1) points; 2) total wins; 3) total goal differential; 4) total goals scored; 5) points earned against top four Conference finishers; 6) disciplinary points; 7) drawing of lots.

==== Match results ====
April 8, 2022 1	Charlotte Independence	3–3	Fuego FC	Charlotte, North Carolina
7:00 PM EDT	Mbuyu 32', 41'; Dutey 89'; McNeill (yellow card) 90'; Dimick (yellow card) 90+7'	Report	Chaney (yellow card) 34'; Ramos 39', (yellow card) 43'; Bijev 81', 90+6'	Stadium: American Legion Memorial Stadium; Attendance: 2,435; Referee: Izlen Peksenar

April 16, 2022 2	Charlotte Independence	2–1	Hailstorm FC	Charlotte, North Carolina
7:00 PM EDT	Ibarra 14'; Mbuyu (yellow card) 33', (goal) 90+1'; Talboys (yellow card) 47'	Report	Parra 6' (pen.); McLean (yellow card) 31'; Rogers (yellow card) 37'; Nortey (yellow card) 78'; Lukic (yellow card) 82'	Stadium: American Legion Memorial Stadium; Attendance: 2,416; Referee: Kevin Broadley

April 22, 2022 3	Charlotte Independence	1–2	Richmond Kickers	Charlotte, North Carolina
7:00 PM EDT	Dutey 37'; Talboys (yellow card) 62'; Mbuyu (red card) 69'	Report	Terzaghi 6', (yellow card) 52'; Baima (yellow card) 23'; Bentley 55'; Cole (yellow card) 71'	Stadium: American Legion Memorial Stadium; Attendance: 2,247; Referee: Alex Billeter

April 30, 2022 4	Charlotte Independence	2–1	Union Omaha	Charlotte, North Carolina
7:00 PM EDT	Ciss (yellow card) 37'; Luquetta 83'; Páez (yellow card) 86'; Bennett 90+4'	Report	Meza 65'	Stadium: American Legion Memorial Stadium; Attendance: 2,902; Referee: John Matto

May 7, 2022 5	Tormenta FC	0–0	Charlotte Independence	Statesboro, Georgia
7:30 PM EDT	Sterling (yellow card) 90+2'	Report	Rocha (yellow card) 63'; Zendejas (yellow card) 77'; Ibarra (yellow card) 90+3'	Stadium: Erik Russell Park; Attendance: 1,242; Referee: Joshua Belk

May 15, 2022 6	Charlotte Independence	2–1	FC Tucson	Charlotte, North Carolina
6:00 PM EDT	Mbuyu 18' (yellow card) 86'; Santos 43' (yellow card) 57' (yellow-red card) 65'; Zendejas (yellow card) 79'	Report	Allen (yellow card) 31'; Moss 38'	Stadium: American Legion Memorial Stadium; Attendance: 3,702; Referee: Matthew Corrigan

May 18, 2022 7	Charlotte Independence	1–2	Hailstorm FC	Charlotte, North Carolina
7:30 PM EDT	Mbuyu 19'; Barber (yellow card) 64'	Report	Parra 2'; Amann (yellow card) 45' (goal) 70'; Nortey (yellow card) 59'; Hernández (yellow card) 72'; Robles (yellow card) 77'; Ulysse (yellow card) 89'; Scally (yellow card) 90+10'	Stadium: American Legion Memorial Stadium; Attendance: 1,798; Referee: Izlen Peksenar

May 21, 2022 8	Forward Madison	1–2	Charlotte Independence	Madison, Wisconsin
8:00 PM EDT	Bartman 76'	Report	Luquetta 7'; Dimick (yellow card) 21'; McNeill 60'; Ibarra (yellow card) 90+1'; Barber (yellow card) 90+3'	Stadium: Breese Stevens Field; Attendance: 3,968; Referee: Austin Saini

May 25, 2022 -	Union Omaha	P–P	Charlotte Independence	Papillion, Nebraska
8:00 PM EDT				Stadium: Werner Park
Note: Postponed due to U.S. Open Cup scheduling conflict

June 4, 2022 9	Greenville Triumph	2–0	Charlotte Independence	Greenville, South Carolina
7:00 PM EDT	Evans 53'; Smart 78' (pen.)	Report	Santos (yellow card) 26'; Dutey (yellow card) 45+2'; Maya (yellow card) 77'; McNeill (yellow card) 84'; Ciss (yellow card) 88'	Stadium: Legacy Early College Field; Referee: Albert Kyei-Mensah

June 11, 2022 10	Richmond Kickers	4–0	Charlotte Independence	Richmond, Virginia
6:30 PM EDT	Bryant 14', 45+4'; Bentley 21', 74'; Fitch (yellow card) 38'	Report	Vint (yellow card) 44'; Dutey (yellow card) 54'; Ciss (yellow card) 67'; Rocha (yellow card) 68'	Stadium: City Stadium; Attendance: 3,041; Referee: Nicholas Karnovsky

June 18, 2022 11	North Carolina FC	2–0	Charlotte Independence	Cary, North Carolina
7:00 PM EDT	Frame (yellow card) 8'; Fernandes (yellow card) 30'; Blanco (yellow card) 32'; Young (yellow card) 51'; Molina 62', (yellow card) 69'; McLaughlin 88' (pen.)	Report	Hegardt (yellow card) 33'; Dutey (yellow card) 45' (yellow-red card) 86'; Santos (yellow card) 52'	Stadium: Sahlen's Stadium at WakeMed Soccer Park; Attendance: 1,967; Referee: DeShun Beard

June 22, 2022 12	Chattanooga Red Wolves	7–1	Charlotte Independence	East Ridge, Tennessee
7:30 PM EDT	Ortiz 23'; Galindrez 29' 38' (pen.) 66' (yellow card) 79'; Carrera (yellow card) 35'; Mentzingen 54'; Páez 73'; P. Hernandez 84'; Avilez (yellow card) 87'	Report	Mbuyu (yellow card) 13'; Acosta 20'; Barber (yellow card) 60'; Barone (penalty missed) 88'; Shevtsov (yellow card) 90+1'	Stadium: CHI Memorial Stadium; Attendance: 2,008; Referee: Wes Caouette

June 26, 2022 13	Charlotte Independence	6–2	Forward Madison	Charlotte, North Carolina
6:00 PM EDT	Mbuyu 9'; Maya (yellow card) 14'; Obertan 22'; Shevtsov 28'; Ibarra (yellow card) 39'; Ciss 58'; Talboys 69'; Barber (yellow card) 84'; Bennett 90'	Report	Wheeler-Omiunu (yellow card) 35'; Streng 37', (yellow card) 82'; Maldonado (yellow card) 39'; Smith 64'; Cassini (yellow card) 68'; Dean (yellow card) 82'; Temguia (yellow card) 90+5'	Stadium: American Legion Memorial Stadium; Attendance: 2,754; Referee: William Steffen

July 1, 2022 14	Union Omaha	0–0	Charlotte Independence	Papillion, Nebraska
8:00 PM EDT	Galvan (yellow card) 90'	Report	Ciss (yellow card) 36'; Amaya (yellow card) 44'; Shevtsov (yellow card) 50'; Dutey (yellow card) 69'; Barber (red card) 83'; Dimick (yellow card) 90+3'	Stadium: Werner Park; Attendance: 3,026; Referee: Velimir Stefanovic

July 8, 2022 15	Charlotte Independence	1–1	Richmond Kickers	Charlotte, North Carolina
7:00 PM EDT	Mbuyu (yellow card) 18'; Amaya (yellow card) 58'; Ibarra 65' (pen.); Rocha (yellow card) 88'	Report	Candela (yellow card) 43'; Bolanos (yellow card) 56'; Gordon 68'	Stadium: American Legion Memorial Stadium; Attendance: 1,544; Referee: Kevin Broadley

July 17, 2022 16	Hailstorm FC	3–1	Charlotte Independence	Windsor, Colorado
7:00 PM EDT	Parra 14' (pen.), (yellow card) 45+1'; Nortey 21'; Norman (yellow card) 28'; Hernández 34', (yellow card) 48'; Olsen (yellow card) 60' (yellow-red card) 63'	Report	Santos (yellow card) 12'; Zendejas (yellow card) 22'; Dutey (yellow card) 30'; Maya (yellow card) 38'; Hegardt (yellow card) 42'; Bennett 67' (pen.); Ciss (yellow card) 83'	Stadium: Future Legends Complex; Attendance: 611; Referee: Killian Richardson

July 23, 2022 17	FC Tucson	2–3	Charlotte Independence	Tucson, Arizona
10:00 PM EDT	Toia 11', (yellow card) 58'; Fox 19'; Fahling (yellow card) 42'	Report	Ciss 4'; Santos (yellow card) 24'; Mbuyu 37'; Dimick (yellow card) 72'; Hegardt 83'	Stadium: Kino Sports Complex; Attendance: 1,096; Referee: Adorae Monroy

July 29, 2022 18	Charlotte Independence	4–0	Fuego FC	Charlotte, North Carolina
7:00 PM EDT	Dutey (yellow card) 12'; Ciss (yellow card) 16'; Bennett (yellow card) 20', (goal) 39', 45+3', 64'; Santos (yellow card) 43'; Acosta 52'	Report	S. Chavez (yellow card) 66'; Keslley (yellow card) 73'; Chaney (yellow card) 90+1'	Stadium: American Legion Memorial Stadium; Attendance: 1,511; Referee: Emma Richards

August 5, 2022 19	Charlotte Independence	0–0	Forward Madison	Charlotte, North Carolina
7:00 PM EDT	Mbuyu (yellow card) 52'; Dutey (yellow card) 58'; Barber (yellow card) 90+7'	Report	Streng (yellow card) 12'; Torres (yellow card) 65'	Stadium: American Legion Memorial Stadium; Attendance: 1,534; Referee: Luis Arroyo

August 13, 2022 20	Tormenta FC	0–3	Charlotte Independence	Statesboro, Georgia
7:30 PM EDT	Sierakowski (yellow card) 27'	Report	Dutey 16'; Conteh (yellow card) 33'; Mbuyu 44'; Bennett 86'; Barber (yellow card) 89'	Stadium: Optim Health Systems Field; Attendance: 1,194; Referee: Izlen Peksenar

August 17, 2022 21	Union Omaha	2–1	Charlotte Independence	Papillion, Nebraska
8:00 PM EDT	Willis (yellow card) 32', (goal) 67'; Bruce (yellow card) 45+2'; Meza 57'	Report	Ibarra (yellow card) 29'; Ciss (yellow card) 43'; Bennett 51' (pen.); Barber (yellow card) 78'; Dutey (yellow card) 90+10'	Stadium: Werner Park; Attendance: 2,258; Referee: Esad Omanovic
Note: Originally scheduled for May 25

August 27, 2022 22	Charlotte Independence	2–2	Chattanooga Red Wolves	Charlotte, North Carolina
7:00 PM EDT	Mbuyu (yellow card) 19', (goal) 90'; Acosta (yellow card) 28'; Ibarra 39'	Report	Tejera 2'; Espinoza (yellow card) 30', (goal) 61'; Carrera-García (penalty missed) 65'; Ortiz (yellow card) 90+5'	Stadium: American Legion Memorial Stadium; Attendance: 930; Referee: Katherine McCormick

August 31, 2022 23	Charlotte Independence	0–2	Tormenta FC	Charlotte, North Carolina
7:00 PM EDT	Rocha (yellow card) 5'; Bennett (yellow card) 55'; Barber (yellow card) 87'	Report	Sterling 6', (yellow card) 87'; Dengler (yellow card) 45+1'; Adeniyi (yellow card) 45+3'; Nembhard (yellow card) 50'; Adjei 71'	Stadium: American Legion Memorial Stadium; Referee: Emma Richards

September 3, 2022 24	FC Tucson	1–0	Charlotte Independence	Tucson, Arizona
10:00 PM EDT	Calixtro (yellow card) 29'; Garcia 39'	Report	Hegardt (yellow card) 80'; Shevtsov (yellow card) 90+4'	Stadium: Kino Sports Complex; Attendance: 1,187; Referee: Corbyn May

September 9, 2022 25	Charlotte Independence	2–1	Greenville Triumph	Charlotte, North Carolina
7:00 PM EDT	Bennett (penalty scored) 24', (yellow card) 35'; Dutey (yellow card) 69'; Conteh (yellow card) 75'; Santos (yellow card) 77'; 1Shevtsov 85'	Report	Smart (yellow card) 8'; Lee (yellow card) 29'; Fricke 50', (yellow card) 58'	Stadium: American Legion Memorial Stadium; Referee: John Matto

September 17, 2022 26	Fuego FC	0–3	Charlotte Independence	Fresno, California
10:30 PM EDT	Smith (yellow card) 36'; Dullysse (yellow card) 36'; Villarreal (yellow card) 45+1'	Report	Falck 38' (o.g.); Bennett 43', 55', (yellow card) 79'; Mbuyu (yellow card) 58'; Zendejas (yellow card) 64'	Stadium: Fresno State Soccer Stadium; Referee: Samantha Martinez

September 24, 2022 27	Charlotte Independence	2–1	North Carolina FC	Charlotte, North Carolina
7:00 PM EDT	Hegardt 10'; Acosta (yellow card) 12'; Dutey (yellow card) 17'; Ciss (yellow card) 35', (goal) 45+1'; Obertan (red card) 79'; Dimick (yellow card) 90+6'	Report	McLaughlin (penalty scored) 85'	Stadium: American Legion Memorial Stadium; Referee: Danielle Chesky

October 1, 2022 28	Chattanooga Red Wolves	3–1	Charlotte Independence	East Ridge, Tennessee
7:30 PM EDT	Espinoza 10'; Mehl 48'; Cardona (yellow card) 54'; Carrera-García (yellow card) 62'; Galindrez 69'	Report	Conteh (yellow card) 3'; Mbuyu 28'; Ciss (yellow card) 64'; Dutey (yellow card) 76'; Shevtsov (yellow card) 82'; Hegardt (penalty missed) 88'	Stadium: CHI Memorial Stadium; Referee: A. Ndiaye

October 8, 2022 29	Greenville Triumph	1–0	Charlotte Independence	Greenville, South Carolina
7:00 PM EDT	Walker (yellow card) 25'; Ibarra (yellow card) 45+4'; Labovitz 79'	Report	Santos (yellow card) 58'	Stadium: Legacy Early College Field; Referee: Gerald Flores

October 15, 2022 30	Charlotte Independence	5–1	North Carolina FC	Charlotte, North Carolina
7:00 PM EDT	Hegardt 35'; Obertan 40', 54'; Mbuyu 59'; Dutey (yellow card) 66'; Bennett (yellow card) 75'; Shevtsov 84'	Report	Skelton (yellow card) 17'; Young (yellow card) 41'; Anderson 53'; Servania (yellow card) 61'	Stadium: American Legion Memorial Stadium; Referee: Brandon Stevis

==== USL League One playoffs ====
October 22, 2022 Quarter Finals	Tormenta FC	2–1	Charlotte Independence	Statesboro, Georgia
7:00 PM EDT	Sterling 48', (penalty scored) 77'	Report	Obertan 8'; Hegardt (yellow card) 40'; Acosta (red card) 49'; Pack (yellow card) 53'; Ibarra (yellow card) 75'; Zendejas (yellow card) 81'; Santos (yellow card) 82'; Ciss (yellow card) 82'; Shevtsov (yellow card) 90+3'	Stadium: Optim Sports Medicine Field; Attendance: 1,268; Referee: Ricardo Fierro

=== U.S. Open Cup ===
April 5, 2022 2nd Round	Charlotte Independence (North Carolina)	2–4	North Carolina Fusion U23	Charlotte, North Carolina
7:00 pm EDT	Dutey 14', (yellow card) 16'; Páez 41'; Ciss (yellow card) 71'; Mbuyu (red card) 76'	Report	Hall (yellow card) 13'; Neto 37'; Silva 51'; Marriott 88'; Lorentz 90+2', (yellow card) 90+5'	Stadium: American Legion Memorial Stadium; Referee: John Rush
