= 2026 Charlotte Independence season =

Charlotte Independence
2026 season
- Owner: Queen City Soccer Club, LLC
- Head coach: Mike Jeffries
- Stadium: American Legion Memorial Stadium
- USL League One: Champions (Players' Shield); Champions (League One Cup)
- U.S. Open Cup: Round of 32
- USL Cup: Quarterfinals
- Top goalscorer: League: Luis Álvarez (3); All: Enzo Martínez; Luis Álvarez (4)
Home colors	Away colors

The 2026 Charlotte Independence season was the club's twelfth season in existence, and their fifth season in USL League One, the third-tier of American soccer.

== Players and staff ==
As of May 6, 2026

Note: Flags indicate national team as defined under FIFA eligibility rules; some limited exceptions apply. Players may hold more than one non-FIFA nationality.

No.	Pos.	Nation	Player
1	GK	CYP	George Tasouris
2	DF	CMR	Fabrice Ngah
3	DF	USA	Joey Skinner
4	DF	FRA	Séga Coulibaly
5	DF	MEX	Javen Romero
6	MF	CMR	Jeando Fuchs
7	FW	LBR	Prince Saydee
8	MF	USA	Christopher Jaime
9	FW	COD	Christy Manzinga
10	MF	ESP	Jon Bakero
11	MF	MEX	Viggo Ortiz

No.	Pos.	Nation	Player
12	GK	USA	Joshua Burton
13	MF	FRA	Mathis Guffroy
14	DF	MTQ	Reudd Manin
16	DF	USA	Miles Lyons
17	DF	USA	Clay Dimick
19	MF	URU	Enzo Martínez
21	DF	USA	Thabo Nare
22	DF	COL	Kevin Riascos
23	FW	USA	Jonathan Nyandjo
24	MF	USA	Jefferson Amaya
26	FW	CMR	Souaibou Marou
28	GK	USA	Matt Levy
44	MF	USA	Matthew Arango
45	DF	USA	Gavin Pierce
47	MF	HON	Luis Álvarez (on loan from Tampa Bay Rowdies)

== Transfers ==
=== Transfers in ===
Date	Position	No.	Name	From	Fee	Ref.
January 29, 2026	MF	11	(Mexico) Viggo Ortiz	(United States) Charleston Battery	Free	
January 30, 2026	FW	8	(United States) Joey Skinner	(United States) Tampa Bay Rowdies	Free	
February 2, 2026	FW	7	(Liberia) Prince Saydee	(United States) Westchester SC	Free	
February 6, 2026	DF	4	(France) Séga Coulibaly	(United States) Portland Hearts of Pine	Free	
February 12, 2026	FW	47	(Honduras) Luis Álvarez	(United States) Tampa Bay Rowdies	Loan deal	
February 18, 2026	GK	31	(Cyprus) Giorgos Tasouris	(Cyprus) Digenis Morphou	Free	
February 20, 2026	DF	20	(France) Mathis Guffroy	(United States) UST Tommies	Free	
February 23, 2026	DF	22	(Colombia) Kevin Riascos	(Israel) Hapoel Haifa F.C.	Free	
February 25, 2026	MF	16	(United States) Miles Lyons	(United States) Monterey Bay FC	Free	
March 5, 2026	DF	14	(Martinique) Reudd Manin	(United States) Presbyterian Blue Hose	Free	
March 6, 2026	MF	24	(United States) Jefferson Amaya	(United States) Real Salt Lake	Free	
March 10, 2026	MF	19	(Uruguay) Enzo Martínez	(United States) Birmingham Legion FC	Free	
March 18, 2026	FW	77	(Democratic Republic of the Congo) Christy Manzinga	(Israel) Bnei Yehuda Tel Aviv F.C.	Free	
March 18, 2026	DF	45	(United States) Gavin Pierce	(United States) Charlotte Independence Academy	Academy contract	
March 26, 2026	DF	23	(United States) Jonathan Nyandjo	(United States) South Georgia Tormenta	Free	
March 26, 2026	DF	21	(United States) Thabo Nare	(United States) South Georgia Tormenta	Free	
April 30, 2026	MF	6	(Cameroon) Jeando Fuchs	(Azerbaijan) Qabala İK	Free	
May 6, 2026	GK	12	(United States) Joshua Burton	(United States) Naples United	25-Day contract	

=== Transfers out ===
Date	Position	No.	Name	To	Fee	Ref.
November 30, 2025	MF	45	(United States) Iván Bonus	(Argentina) Estudiantes	Academy contract expired	
November 30, 2025	MF	48	(United States) Adrian Renteria	(United States) Charlotte Independence Academy	Academy contract expired	
December 1, 2025	DF	13	(United States) Anthony Sorenson	(United States) Chattanooga FC	Free	
December 1, 2025	MF	6	(Senegal) Omar Ciss	None	Free	
December 1, 2025	MF	7	(Democratic Republic of the Congo) Tresor Mbuyu	(United States) Asheville City SC	Free	
December 1, 2025	FW	8	(Colombia) Juan David Moreno	(Armenia) FC Syunik	Free	
December 1, 2025	DF	20	(United States) Tobi Adewole	(United States) Chattanooga Red Wolves	Free	
December 1, 2025	DF	23	(United States) Michael DeShields	(United States) Virginia Dream	Free	
December 1, 2025	FW	77	(Brazil) Pedro Fonseca	None	Free	
December 1, 2025	DF	3	(Cameroon) Pele Ousmanou	(United States) Hartford Athletic	End of loan	
December 1, 2025	MF	22	(Senegal) Djibril Faye	None	Free	
December 23, 2025	DF	11	(Senegal) Bachir Ndiaye	(United States) Miami FC	Free	
January 15, 2026	FW	21	(South Africa) Tumi Moshobane	(United States) Athletic Club Boise	Free	
January 21, 2026	DF	14	(Bolivia) Paolo Alcócer	(Bolivia) Universitario de Vinto	Free	
January 27, 2026	GK	31	(Jamaica) Amal Knight	(United States) Greenville Triumph	Free	
February 18, 2026	MF	10	(United States) Nathan Gray	(United States) FC Cincinnati 2	Free	
February 23, 2026	FW	99	(United States) Christian Chaney	(United States) Corpus Christi	Free	
February 26, 2026	MF	15	(United States) Rafael Jauregui	(United States) Tacoma Defiance	Free	

== Competitions ==
=== USL League One ===
==== Table ====
Pos	Team	Pld	W	L	T	GF	GA	GD	Pts	Qualification
1	Charlotte Independence (S, C)	32	20	6	6	74	46	+28	66	Playoffs
2	Union Omaha	32	19	8	5	54	34	+20	62	Playoffs
3	AC Boise	32	17	8	7	51	41	+10	58	Playoffs
4	Forward Madison FC	32	16	8	8	54	30	+24	56	Playoffs
5	Spokane Velocity FC	32	16	10	6	50	44	+6	54	Playoffs

Source: USL League One
Rules for classification: 1) points; 2) total wins; 3) total goal differential; 4) total goals scored; 5) points earned against top four finishers; 6) disciplinary points; 7) drawing of lots.
(C) Champions; (S) Players' Shield winner

==== Matches ====
March 14 1	Westchester SC	1–1	Charlotte Independence	Mount Vernon, New York
7:00 PM EDT	Guezen 1'; Burko (yellow card) 32'; Drack (yellow card) 90+1'	Report	Romero (yellow card) 41'; Álvarez (yellow card) 45+2'; Manin (yellow card) 63'; Riascos (yellow card) 90+5'; Ortiz 90+7'	Stadium: The Stadium at Memorial Field; Attendance: 1,120; Referee: Deny Kulasinac

March 27 2	Charlotte Independence	4–0	Spokane Velocity	Charlotte, North Carolina
7:30 PM EDT	Fitch 2' (o.g.); Álvarez 23'; Jaime (yellow card) 41'; Romero 45+3'; Lyons 80'		Waldeck (yellow card) 14'; Gallardo (yellow card) 45+3'; Veidman (yellow card) 63'	Stadium: American Legion Memorial Stadium; Attendance: 925; Referee: Kyle Johnston

April 4 3	New York Cosmos	3–2	Charlotte Independence	Paterson, New Jersey
7:00 PM EDT	Spengler 6' (pen.), 22' (pen.), 81' (pen.); Mendonca (yellow card) 44'; Milovanov (yellow card) 45+7'; Noecker (red card) 75'	Report	Ortiz 13'; Manin (yellow card) 20'; Dimick (yellow card) 45+2'; Amaya 45+8'; Lyons (yellow card) 64'	Stadium: Hinchliffe Stadium; Attendance: 1,170; Referee: Muhammad Kaleia

April 12 4	Charlotte Independence	v	South Georgia Tormenta FC	Charlotte, North Carolina
7:30 PM EDT				Stadium: American Legion Memorial Stadium
Note: Game cancelled following South Georgia Tormenta FC's withdrawal from USL League One.

April 18 5	One Knoxville SC	2–1	Charlotte Independence	Knoxville, Tennessee
7:00 PM EDT	Gill (yellow card) 2'; Manin 13' (o.g.); Perkins (yellow card) 47'; Linhares 88'		Amaya (yellow card) 25'; Romero (yellow card) 30'; Marou 34'	Stadium: Covenant Health Park

May 2 6	Fort Wayne FC	2–2	Charlotte Independence	Fort Wayne, Indiana
7:30 PM EDT	Healy 4'; Smith 10'; Solis (yellow card) 70'; Jordan (yellow card) 87'	Report	Manzinga 7' (yellow card) 70'; Martínez 15'; Bakero (yellow card) 72'	Stadium: Ruoff Mortgage Stadium; Attendance: 4,000; Referee: Christopher Calderon

May 6 7	Charlotte Independence	1–0	Athletic Club Boise	Charlotte, North Carolina
7:30 PM EDT	Amaya (yellow card) 79'; Álvarez 81'; Lyons (yellow card) 90+2'	Report	Kliewer (yellow card) 59'; Moon (yellow card) 66'; Bodily (yellow card) 77'	Stadium: American Legion Memorial Stadium; Attendance: 592; Referee: Alejo Calume

May 9 8	Corpus Christi FC	1–3	Charlotte Independence	Corpus Christi, Texas
8:30 PM EDT	Abeal (yellow card) 22'; Langlois 35'; Chaney (yellow card) 58'; Zayed (yellow card) 64'; Dietrich (red card) 70'	Report	Martínez 15'; Amaya (yellow card) 21' (goal) 40'; Skinner (yellow card) 59'; Romero (yellow card) 67'; Álvarez 722' (pen.); Levy (yellow card) 80'	Stadium: Cabaniss Athletic Complex; Attendance: 547; Referee: Robert Vincze

May 23 9	Charlotte Independence	3–1	Forward Madison FC	Matthews, North Carolina
7:00 PM EDT	Álvarez 17'; Manzinga 24'; Skinner (yellow card) 80'; Lyons 88'	Report	Annor 14'; Torres (yellow card) 38' (yellow-red card) 90+2'; Munjoma (yellow card) 42'; Gebhard (yellow card) 67'	Stadium: Sportsplex at Matthews; Attendance: 548; Referee: Kyle Johnston

May 30 10	Chattanooga Red Wolves SC	v	Charlotte Independence	East Ridge, Tennessee
7:00 PM EDT				Stadium: CHI Memorial Stadium

June 3 11	FC Naples	v	Charlotte Independence	Naples, Florida
7:30 PM EDT				Stadium: Paradise Coast Sports Complex

June 10 12	Charlotte Independence	v	Union Omaha	Matthews, North Carolina
7:30 PM EDT				Stadium: Sportsplex at Matthews

June 13 13	Charlotte Independence	v	FC Naples	Charlotte, North Carolina
7:00 PM EDT				Stadium: American Legion Memorial Stadium

June 20 14	South Georgia Tormenta FC	v	Charlotte Independence	Statesboro, Georgia
7:30 PM EDT				Stadium: Tormenta Stadium
Note: Game cancelled following South Georgia Tormenta FC's withdrawal from USL League One.

July 1 15	Charlotte Independence	v	Corpus Christi FC	Matthews, North Carolina
7:30 PM EDT				Stadium: Sportsplex at Matthews

July 5 16	AV Alta FC	v	Charlotte Independence	Lancaster, California
11:00 PM EDT				Stadium: Lancaster Municipal Stadium

July 18 17	Charlotte Independence	v	Chattanooga Red Wolves SC	Matthews, North Carolina
7:00 PM EDT				Stadium: Sportsplex at Matthews

July 22 18	Spokane Velocity	v	Charlotte Independence	Spokane, Washington
9:00 PM EDT				Stadium: One Spokane Stadium

July 25 19	Charlotte Independence	v	Richmond Kickers	Charlotte, North Carolina
7:00 PM EDT				Stadium: American Legion Memorial Stadium

August 1 20	Charlotte Independence	v	One Knoxville SC	Charlotte, North Carolina
7:00 PM EDT				Stadium: American Legion Memorial Stadium

August 8 21	Charlotte Independence	v	Greenville Triumph	Charlotte, North Carolina
7:00 PM EDT				Stadium: American Legion Memorial Stadium

August 15 22	Charlotte Independence	v	Sarasota Paradise	Charlotte, North Carolina
7:00 PM EDT				Stadium: American Legion Memorial Stadium

August 22 23	Forward Madison FC	v	Charlotte Independence	Madison, Wisconsin
8:00 PM EDT				Stadium: Breese Stevens Field

August 29 24	Charlotte Independence	v	AV Alta FC	Matthews, North Carolina
7:00 PM EDT				Stadium: Sportsplex at Matthews

September 2 25	Charlotte Independence	v	Portland Hearts of Pine	Matthews, North Carolina
7:30 PM EDT				Stadium: Mecklenburg County Sportsplex

September 5 26	Union Omaha	v	Charlotte Independence	Omaha, Nebraska
				Stadium: Morrison Stadium

September 12 27	Charlotte Independence	v	Westchester SC	Charlotte, North Carolina
7:00 PM EDT				Stadium: American Legion Memorial Stadium

September 16 28	Athletic Club Boise	v	Charlotte Independence	Garden City, Idaho
9:00 PM EDT				Stadium: Stadium at Expo Idaho

September 19 29	Richmond Kickers	v	Charlotte Independence	Richmond, Virginia
6:00 PM EDT				Stadium: City Stadium

September 26 30	Charlotte Independence	v	Fort Wayne FC	Matthews, North Carolina
7:00 PM EDT				Stadium: Sportsplex at Matthews

October 3 31	Sarasota Paradise	v	Charlotte Independence	Lakewood Ranch, Florida
7:30 PM EDT				Stadium: Premier Sports Campus

October 10 32	Charlotte Independence	v	New York Cosmos	Matthews, North Carolina
7:00 PM EDT				Stadium: Sportsplex at Matthews

October 17 33	Greenville Triumph SC	v	Charlotte Independence	Mauldin, South Carolina
7:00 PM EDT				Stadium: GE Vernova Park

October 24 34	Portland Hearts of Pine	v	Charlotte Independence	Portland, Maine
5:00 PM EDT				Stadium: Fitzpatrick Stadium

=== U.S. Open Cup ===
March 19 First round	Charlotte Independence (North Carolina)	4–1	(Maryland) Ristozi FC	Matthews, North Carolina
6:30 pm EDT	Dimick 4'; Manin (yellow card) 44'; Enzo Martínez 69'; Ngah 87'; Jaime 89'		Ono 38'; Okazaki (yellow card) 51'	Stadium: Sportsplex at Matthews; Attendance: 3,684; Referee: Matthew Thompson

March 31 Second round	Charlotte Independence (North Carolina)	3–2	(South Carolina) Charleston Battery	Matthews, North Carolina
7:30 pm EDT	Marou 37'; Álvarez 58', (yellow card) 93'; Amaya (yellow card) 90+2'; Romero (yellow card) 90+7'; Ortiz 118', (yellow card) 119'		Kelly (yellow card) 26' (yellow-red card) 90+7'; Kissiedou (yellow card) 47'; Suber (yellow card) 52'; Landru 70'; Foster 77', (yellow card) 120+5'	Stadium: Sportsplex at Matthews; Attendance: 3,684; Referee: Matthew Thompson

April 15 Round of 32	Charlotte FC (North Carolina)	6–0	(North Carolina) Charlotte Independence	Matthews, North Carolina
7:30 pm EDT	Goodwin 45+1'; Kessler 60'; Berchimas 68'; Schnegg 73'; Vargas 86'; Coulibaly 89'	Report	Tasouris (red card) 23'; Nare (yellow card) 40'; Álvarez (yellow card) 56'	Stadium: Sportsplex at Matthews; Attendance: 3,684; Referee: Matthew Thompson

=== USL Cup ===
Pos	Lg	Team	Pld	W	PKW	PKL	L	GF	GA	GD	Pts	Qualification
1	USL1	Charlotte Independence	4	2	2	0	0	6	4	+2	10	Advance to knockout stage
2	USLC	Charleston Battery	4	2	1	1	0	8	3	+5	9	
3	USLC	Pittsburgh Riverhounds SC	4	2	0	2	0	6	1	+5	8	
4	USL1	Greenville Triumph SC	4	1	0	0	3	4	7	−3	3	
5	USLC	Loudoun United FC	4	1	0	0	3	4	7	−3	3	
6	USL1	Richmond Kickers	4	1	0	0	3	3	9	−6	3	

==== Group stage ====
April 25 1	Richmond Kickers	1–2	Charlotte Independence	Richmond, VA
6:00 PM EDT	Anderson (yellow card) 59'; Layton 70'	Report	Martínez 10', 39'; Dimick (yellow card) 78'	Stadium: City Stadium

May 15 2	Charlotte Independence	1–1 (4–2 p)	Pittsburgh Riverhounds SC	Charlotte, North Carolina
7:30 PM EDT	Garcia 81'	Report	Manzinga 22'	Stadium: American Legion Memorial Stadium; Attendance: 2,545; Referee: Elvis Osmanovic
	Penalties
	Álvarez (penalty scored); Bakero (penalty scored); Romero (penalty scored); Marou (penalty scored)		(penalty scored) Bassett; (penalty missed) Ahl; (penalty scored) Dikwa; (penalty missed) Mertz

June 24 3	Charlotte Independence	1–0	Greenville Triumph SC	Charlotte, North Carolina
7:30 PM EDT	Manin 77'			Stadium: American Legion Memorial Stadium; Attendance: 713; Referee: Matthew Corrigan

July 11 4	Charleston Battery	2–2 (2–4 p)	Charlotte Independence	Mount Pleasant, South Carolina
7:30 PM EDT	Foster 27'; Swan 59'	Report	Bakero 37'; Marou 53'	Stadium: Patriots Point; Attendance: 3,002; Referee: Mario Maric
	Penalties
	Suber (penalty scored); Kelly (penalty missed); Ycaza (penalty scored); Akpunonu (penalty missed)		(penalty scored) Saydee; (penalty scored) Romero; (penalty scored) Marou; (penalty scored) Amaya

==== Knockout stage ====
August 12 Quarterfinals	Charlotte Independence	2–4	Hartford Athletic	Matthews, North Carolina
7:00 PM EDT	Scarlett 73' (o.g.); Manin 85'	Report	Anaku 23', 36'; Obalola 52'; Williams 67'	Stadium: Sportsplex at Matthews; Attendance: 655; Referee: Ekaterina Koroleva
