= 2020 Charlotte Independence season =

Charlotte Independence
2020 season
- President: Jim McPhilliamy
- Head coach: Mike Jeffries
- Stadium: Sportsplex at Matthews
- USL: Conference: 6th Group G: 1st
- USL Playoffs: Conference Quarterfinals
- U.S. Open Cup: Cancelled
- Biggest win: MEM 0–2 CLT (September 2); CLT 3–1 NC (September 5); BHM 1–3 CLT (September 12)
- Biggest defeat: BHM 4–1 CLT (August 5); CLT 1–4 BHM (August 29)
Home colors	Away colors

The 2020 Charlotte Independence season was the club's sixth season of existence, and their sixth in the USL Championship (USLC), the second tier of American soccer. This article covers the period from November 18, 2019, the day after the 2019 USLC Playoff Final, to the conclusion of the 2020 USLC Playoff Final, scheduled for November 12–16, 2020.

== Review ==
=== Pre-season ===
In December, the club and Mecklenburg County broke ground on renovations to American Legion Memorial Stadium that will upgrade the facility and create a home ground for the Independence through a ten-year lease, with the opening scheduled for Spring of 2021. In January, the club announced that they were retaining seven players from the previous year's roster, while also acknowledging that longtime club presence Alex Martínez would not be among the returnees. Later signings in January included a Congolese midfielder with Ligue 2 experience at AS Béziers (Junior Etou), the 2017 USLC Golden Boot winner Dane Kelly, as well as two rookies (Oscar Ramsay and Casey Penland) from the team's Invitational Combine.

Acquisitions continued apace in February as the club signed a veteran defender (Duke Lacroix), a UNC Charlotte alum with Championship goalkeeping experience (Austin Pack), and a former loanee winger (Derek Gebhard). The club then announced the signing of two of the club's academy players, (Owen Barber) and (Joey Skinner), to professional contracts. A player with U-15 USMNT experience, Rey Ortiz, was brought in from FC Cincinnati on a season-long loan. The next addition was Guido Vadalá, a 23-year-old forward with first-team experience at Argentinian club Boca Juniors.

On the minus side, the club announced the retirement of veteran Charlotte forward Jorge Herrera.

=== March ===
Charlotte began their 2020 campaign with a 2–1 victory on the road versus Sporting Kansas City II. In response to the COVID-19 pandemic, the league suspended play for 30 days beginning March 12. On March 19, the suspension was further extended to May 10.

=== June ===
On June 4, the league announced a tentative date of July 11 for a resumption of play. Later, the league announced that upon resumption of play, teams would be separated into eight regional groups and play enough matches to complete a 16-game schedule. On June 26, the league announced that Charlotte was to be placed into Group G with other regional clubs including Birmingham, Memphis, and North Carolina.

=== July ===
Charlotte began their Return To Play action with a 2–2 draw away to Memphis, recovering twice from single goal deficits to bring the match level. The draw was sandwiched by postponements to matches away in Miami and home versus North Carolina.

=== August ===
The Independence began the month with a 4–1 loss away to Birmingham. The team failed to score from open play, with their lone goal coming from a penalty conversion by Enzo Martínez. That loss was followed up by successive 1-1 draws, the first on the 8th versus Charleston in the club's home opener, followed by the second draw on the 12th of the month against Birmingham. The team finished the three-game homestand with a 3–2 victory over Memphis, their first home win of the season. The team then traveled to Miami for an out-of-group match that resulted in a 2–1 loss. The Jacks completed the month with a two-game homestand. In the first match, the team secured a 1–0 win on the first professional goal scored by Rey Ortiz. The team finished the month as they started it, with a 4–1 loss to Birmingham. The Jacks conceded four unanswered goals before Dane Kelly netted his fifth goal of the season in the 85th minute.

=== September ===
The Independence began a busy month with a 2–0 win on the road versus Memphis. The win solidified the club's hold on second place in Group G, five points clear of third place. The club followed up that performance with a 3–1 home win against North Carolina. The sum total of the Independence scoring consisted of a Dane Kelly hat trick. The club then went on the road to score a 3–1 win over Group G leading Birmingham. The Jacks, aided a brace of goals from Dane Kelly, moved within one point of Birmingham in the standings. Staying on the road, the Independence scored another victory, this time over North Carolina. Despite being down to 10 men at the time by way of a Dane Kelly straight red card, Aaron Maund headed home the only goal of the match in the 51st minute to secure the club's first away win against NCFC.

The Jacks returned home four days later to face Miami FC. The point the club earned in the scoreless draw moved the Independence into a tie with Birmingham atop the Group G standings. The Independence then suffered their first loss of the month, falling 3–1 at home versus Memphis.

=== October ===
The Jacks secured the top spot in Group G thanks to a 1–0 road win versus North Carolina coupled with a Memphis victory over Birmingham on October 3. The Independence were then eliminated from the postseason in their opening conference quarterfinal match hosting Charleston Battery. The Jacks finished regulation time in a 1–1 deadlock, then conceded a headed goal by Arthur Bosua in the 101st minute.

== Club ==
=== Roster ===
As of March 4, 2020

No.	Position	Nation	Player
1	GK	USA	Austin Pack
2	DF	TOG	Shalom Dutey
3	DF	USA	Hugh Roberts
4	MF	USA	Jake Areman
5	DF	USA	Casey Penland
6	DF	USA	Jack Maher (on loan from Nashville SC)
7	MF	USA	Rey Ortiz (on loan from FC Cincinnati)
9	FW	JAM	Dane Kelly
11	MF	ARG	Valentin Sabella
13	MF	TTO	Kevan George
14	DF	USA	Duke Lacroix
15	MF	USA	Luke Haakenson (on loan from Nashville SC)
17	DF	USA	Clay Dimick
19	FW	URU	Enzo Martínez
20	MF	NZL	Oscar Ramsay
21	MF	CGO	Brunallergene Etou
22	DF	LBR	Joel Johnson
23	FW	ARG	Guido Vadalá
27	MF	USA	Derek Gebhard
32	FW	COD	Tresor Mbuyu
33	GK	USA	Brandon Miller
34	DF	USA	Owen Barber
35	DF	USA	Joey Skinner

USL Academy Contract

== Competitions ==
=== Exhibitions ===
February 12 Preseason 1	Tormenta FC	2–4	Charlotte Independence	Columbia, South Carolina
5:00PM EDT	Vinyals (Mayr-Fälten); Micaletto (pen.)	Report	(pen.)	Stadium: SCUFC Monticello Road Soccer Center

February 15 Preseason 2	Charlotte Independence	1–1	North Carolina FC	Matthews, North Carolina
2:00PM EDT	Goal	Report	Miller 7'	Stadium: Sportsplex at Matthews

February 19 Preseason 3	Charlotte Independence	0–0	Stumptown Athletic	Matthews, North Carolina
11:00AM EDT		Report		Stadium: Sportsplex at Matthews

February 22 Preseason 4	Greenville Triumph SC	0–2	Charlotte Independence	Greenville, South Carolina
7:00PM EDT		Report		Stadium: Alumni Stadium

February 29 Preseason 5	Atlanta United FC	Cancelled	Charlotte Independence	Marietta, Georgia
2:00PM EDT		Report		Stadium: Children’s HealthCare of Atlanta Training Ground

=== USL Championship ===
==== Standings — Group G ====
Pos	Team	Pld	W	D	L	GF	GA	GD	Pts	PPG	Qualification
1	Charlotte Independence	16	8	4	4	24	22	+2	28	1.75	Advance to USL Championship Playoffs
2	Birmingham Legion FC	16	7	4	5	29	19	+10	25	1.56	Advance to USL Championship Playoffs
3	North Carolina FC	15	6	1	8	17	21	−4	19	1.27	
4	Memphis 901 FC	15	4	4	7	24	31	−7	16	1.07	

Source: USL

==== Match results ====
On December 20, 2019, the USL announced the 2020 season schedule, creating the following fixture list for the early part of Charlotte's season.

March 8 1	Sporting Kansas City II	1–2	Charlotte Independence	Kansas City, Kansas
5:00 PM EDT (UTC–5)	Maher 19' (o.g.); Čuić (yellow card) 79'	Report	Johnson (yellow card) 15'; Gebhard 25'; Kelly (yellow card) 30', (goal) 85'	Stadium: Children's Mercy Park; Attendance: 691; Referee: Lukasz Szpala

As part of the resumption of league play, the following schedule was announced for Charlotte on July 2, 2020.

July 22 2	Miami FC	P–P	Charlotte Independence	Miami, Florida
TBD PM EDT				Stadium: Riccardo Silva Stadium
Note: Match postponed to August 23 due to the pandemic impact in the Miami area.

July 26 3	Memphis 901 FC	2–2	Charlotte Independence	Memphis, Tennessee
8:30 PM EDT	Allen 16'; Buckmaster 56', (yellow card) 86'; Reed (yellow card) 90+2'	Report	Etou (yellow card) 37'; Kelly (yellow card) 45+1'; Haakenson 51'; Sabella 83'	Stadium: AutoZone Park; Referee: Ben Meyer

July 29 4	Charlotte Independence	P–P	North Carolina FC	Matthews, North Carolina
TBA PM EDT				Stadium: Sportsplex at Matthews
Note: Match postponed to 8/26/2020 due to Covid19 restrictions in the state of North Carolina.

August 5 5	Birmingham Legion	4–1	Charlotte Independence	Birmingham, Alabama
8:00 PM EDT	Dean 5'; Brett 11', 66'; Lapa 52'	Report	Vadalá (yellow card) 29'; Martínez 76' (pen.)	Stadium: BBVA Field; Referee: Matthew Thompson

August 8 6	Charlotte Independence	1–1	Charleston Battery	Matthews, North Carolina
7:00 PM EDT	Etou (yellow card) 15'; Kelly 38'; Haakenson (yellow card) 90+4'	Report	Maund 42' (o.g.); Clarke (red card) 85'	Stadium: Sportsplex at Matthews; Referee: Sergii Demianchuk

August 12 7	Charlotte Independence	1–1	Birmingham Legion	Matthews, North Carolina
7:00 PM EDT	Etou (yellow card) 52'; Kelly 82'	Report	Lopez (yellow card) 3', (goal) 90+3'; E. Crognale (yellow card) 47'; Kasim (yellow card) 56'; Asiedu (yellow card) 68' (yellow-red card) 80'	Stadium: Sportsplex at Matthews; Referee: John Matto

August 15 8	Charlotte Independence	3–2	Memphis 901 FC	Matthews, North Carolina
7:00 PM EDT	Johnson (yellow card) 30'; Kelly 53'; Martinez 60' (pen.); Lacroix (yellow card) 65'; Haakenson 69'	Report	Segbers 13', (yellow card) 72'; Mentzingen 51'; Muckette (yellow card) 90+4'	Stadium: Sportsplex at Matthews; Referee: Elvis Osmanovic

August 23 2	Miami FC	2–1	Charlotte Independence	Miami, Florida
7:00 PM EDT	Williams 16'; Granitto 86'; Gammiero (yellow card) 89'	Report	Areman 8'; Roberts (yellow card) 90+1'	Stadium: Riccardo Silva Stadium; Referee: Jonathan Bilinski

August 26 4	Charlotte Independence	1–0	North Carolina FC	Matthews, North Carolina
7:00 PM EDT	Ortiz 59'	Report	Ward (yellow card) 42'; Pecka (yellow card) 68'	Stadium: Sportsplex at Matthews; Referee: Kevin Broadley

August 29 9	Charlotte Independence	1–4	Birmingham Legion	Matthews, North Carolina
7:00 PM EDT	Etou (yellow card) 82'; Kelly 86'	Report	A. Crognale (yellow card) 24'; Servania 26'; Brett 33', 49'; E. Crognale (yellow card) 42' (yellow-red card) 58'; Asiedu (yellow card) 63'; Wright 83', (yellow card) 90+1'	Stadium: Sportsplex at Matthews; Referee: Sergii Demianchuk

September 2 10	Memphis 901 FC	0–2	Charlotte Independence	Memphis, Tennessee
8:00 PM EDT	Marsh-Brown (penalty missed) 8'; Paul (yellow card) 56'	Report	Marsh-Brown 32' (o.g.); Haakenson 45+3'	Stadium: AutoZone Park; Referee: Tori Penso

September 5 11	Charlotte Independence	3–1	North Carolina FC	Matthews, North Carolina
7:00 PM EDT	Kelly 10', 20', (yellow card) 43', (goal) 79'; Lacroix (yellow card) 18'; Martínez (yellow card) 51'	Report	Smith (yellow card) 35'; Taylor (yellow card) 60'; Fortune 90+1'	Stadium: Sportsplex at Matthews; Referee: Jonathan Bilinski

September 12 12	Birmingham Legion	1–3	Charlotte Independence	Birmingham, Alabama
7:30 PM EDT	Brett 34'; Asiedu (yellow card) 48' (yellow-red card) 60'	Report	Kelly 17', (yellow card) 30', (goal) 45'; Etou (yellow card) 23'; Lacroix (yellow card) 81'; Gebhard 86'; Johnson (yellow card) 88' (yellow-red card) 90'	Stadium: BBVA Field; Referee: Matthew Thompson

September 19 13	North Carolina FC	0–1	Charlotte Independence	Cary, North Carolina
TBA PM EDT	Albadawi (yellow card) 45+1' (yellow-red card) 67'; Taylor (yellow card) 50'; Donovan (yellow card) 69'; Fortune (yellow card) 73'	Report	Kelly (red card) 44'; Miller (yellow card) 45+1'; Martínez (yellow card) 45+1'; Maund 51'; Lacroix (yellow card) 66'	Stadium: Sahlen's Stadium at WakeMed Soccer Park; Referee: Matthew Franz

September 23 14	Charlotte Independence	0–0	Miami FC	Matthews, North Carolina
7:00 PM EDT	Miller (yellow card) 33'; Dimick (yellow card) 43'; Vadalá (yellow card) 86'; Martínez (yellow card) 90+5'	Report	James (yellow card) 45'; Heath (yellow card) 51'	Stadium: Sportsplex at Matthews; Referee: Kevin Broadley

September 26 15	Charlotte Independence	1–3	Memphis 901 FC	Matthews, North Carolina
7:00 PM EDT	Roberts (yellow card) 12'; Kelly 24'; Sabella (yellow card) 33'; Etou (yellow card) 68'; Dimick (yellow card) 82'	Report	Paul (yellow card) 20'; Baxter 41'; Jennings 43', 86'; McCabe (yellow card) 89'; Allen (yellow card) 90+1'	Stadium: Sportsplex at Matthews; Referee: Eric Tattersall

October 3 16	North Carolina FC	0–1	Charlotte Independence	Cary, North Carolina
7:00 PM EDT		Report	Haakenson (yellow card) 45+1'; Kelly (yellow card) 88'; Gebhard (yellow card) 90+1'; Sabella 90+4', (yellow card) 90+5'	Stadium: Sahlen's Stadium at WakeMed Soccer Park; Attendance: 432; Referee: John Griggs
Note: Rescheduled from September 30 to accommodate newly scheduled match between North Carolina and New York Red Bulls II.

==== USL Cup Playoffs ====
October 10 Conf. Quarterfinals	Charlotte Independence	1–2 (a.e.t.)	Charleston Battery	Matthews, North Carolina
7:00 PM EDT	Roberts 64'; Martínez (yellow card) 90+4'; Dimick (yellow card) 100'; Sabella (yellow card) 118'	Report	Daley 3'; Crawford (yellow card) 63'; Paterson (yellow card) 71'; Marini (yellow card) 99'; Bosua 101', (yellow card) 109'	Stadium: Sportsplex at Matthews; Attendance: 100; Referee: Lukasz Szpala

=== U.S. Open Cup ===
As a USL Championship club, the Independence will enter the competition in the Second Round, to be played April 7–9.

April 7 Second round	Charlotte Independence (North Carolina)	P–P	(North Carolina) Stumptown Athletic	Matthews, North Carolina
7:00 p.m. EDT				Stadium: Sportsplex at Matthews
Note: Match postponed due to the COVID-19 pandemic

=== Statistics ===
As of November 23, 2020 Source: us.soccerway.com

Numbers after plus-sign(+) denote appearances as a substitute.

==== Appearances and goals ====
No.	Pos	Nat	Player	Total		USL Championship Regular Season		Playoffs	
No.	Pos	Nat	Player	Apps	Goals	Apps	Goals	Apps	Goals
15	MF	(United States) USA	Luke Haakenson	17	3	12+4	3	1+0	0
19	FW	(Uruguay) URU	Enzo Martínez	17	2	16+0	2	1+0	0
3	DF	(United States) USA	Hugh Roberts	17	2	16+0	1	1+0	1
7	MF	(United States) USA	Rey Ortiz	17	1	10+6	1	1+0	0
21	MF	(Republic of the Congo) CGO	Brunallergene Etou	17	0	16+0	0	1+0	0
14	DF	(United States) USA	Duke Lacroix	17	0	16+0	0	1+0	0
33	GK	(United States) USA	Brandon Miller	17	0	16+0	0	1+0	0
9	FW	(Jamaica) JAM	Dane Kelly	16	11	14+1	11	1+0	0
4	MF	(United States) USA	Jake Areman	15	1	12+2	1	1+0	0
27	MF	(United States) USA	Derek Gebhard	13	2	7+5	2	0+1	0
17	DF	(United States) USA	Clay Dimick	13	0	6+6	0	1+0	0
11	MF	(Argentina) ARG	Valentin Sabella	14	2	4+9	2	0+1	0
18	DF	(United States) USA	Aaron Maund	14	1	13+1	1	0	0
22	DF	(Liberia) LBR	Joel Johnson	14	0	12+1	0	1+0	0
23	FW	(Argentina) ARG	Guido Vadalá	10	0	2+7	0	0+1	0
32	FW	(Democratic Republic of the Congo) COD	Tresor Mbuyu	8	0	1+7	0	0	0
90	FW	(United States) USA	Christian Chaney	7	0	0+6	0	0+1	0
20	MF	(New Zealand) NZL	Oscar Ramsay	4	0	0+4	0	0	0
13	MF	(Trinidad and Tobago) TTO	Kevan George	1	0	1+0	0	0	0
