= Luke Haakenson =

American soccer player (born 1997)

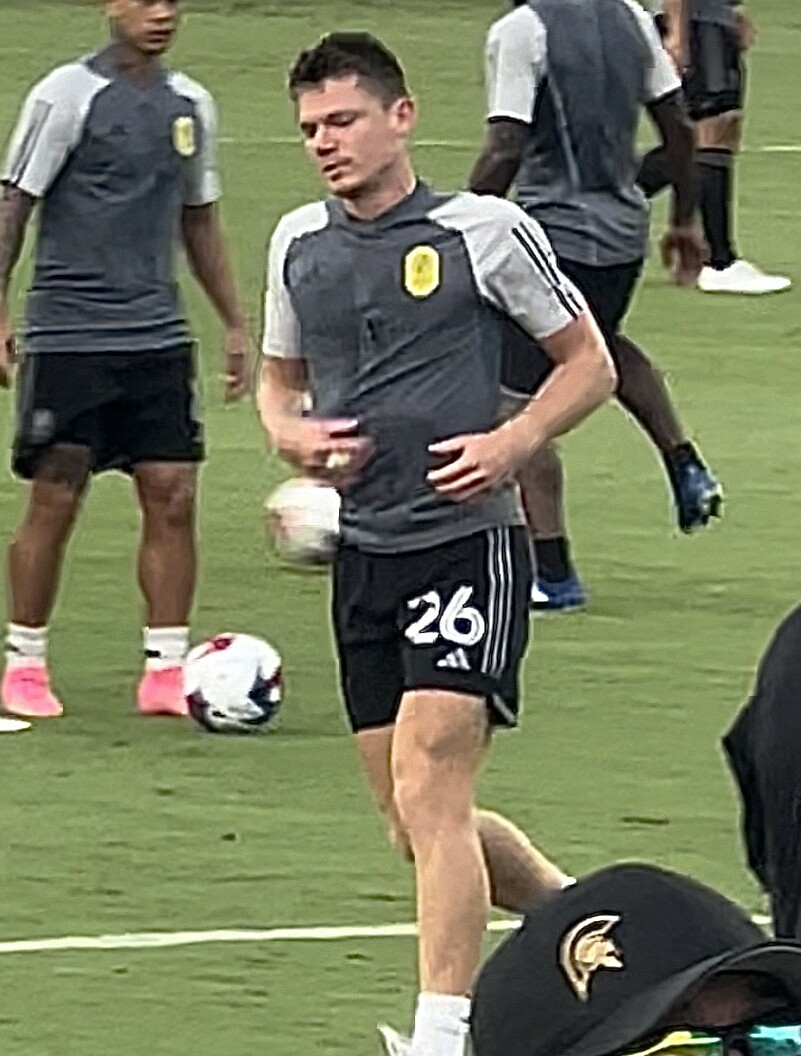
- Haakenson with Nashville SC in 2023

Personal information
- Date of birth: September 10, 1997 (age 29)
- Place of birth: Maple Grove, Minnesota, United States
- Height: 5 ft 10 in (1.78 m)
- Position: Attacking midfielder

Team information
- Current team: San Antonio FC
- Number: 7

Youth career
- 2015–2016: Shattuck-Saint Mary's

College career
Years	Team	Apps	(Gls)
2016–2019	Creighton Bluejays	74	(14)

Senior career*
Years	Team	Apps	(Gls)
2016	Minneapolis City	2	(1)
2018	Des Moines Menace	10	(0)
2018	Chicago FC United	10	(3)
2019	Minneapolis City	3	(0)
2020–2023	Nashville SC	57	(2)
2020	→ Charlotte Independence (loan)	16	(3)
2024–	San Antonio FC	69	(7)
- * Club domestic league appearances and goals as of October 31, 2026

Luke Haakenson (born September 10, 1997) is an American professional soccer player who plays as an attacking midfielder for USL Championship club San Antonio FC.

== Career ==
=== College and amateur ===
Haakenson played four years of college soccer at Creighton University between 2016 and 2019, making 74 appearances, scoring 14 goals and tallying 11 assists.

While playing at college, Haakenson appeared for clubs in the USL PDL for Des Moines Menace and Chicago FC United, and in the NPSL for Minneapolis City SC on two separate occasions.

=== Professional ===
On January 13, 2020, Haakenson was selected 80th overall in the 2020 MLS SuperDraft by Nashville SC. He officially signed with the MLS side on February 25, 2020.

On March 6, 2020, Haakenson was loaned out to USL Championship side Charlotte Independence.

He made his professional debut on March 8, 2020, appearing as a 63rd-minute substitute in a 2–1 win over Sporting Kansas City II.

On June 23, 2021, Haakenson scored his first MLS goals when he scored twice, including a late game winner against Toronto FC.

He left Nashville following the 2023 season.

Haakenson signed with USL Championship side San Antonio FC on January 23, 2024.

== Career statistics ==
=== Club ===
As of match played October 11, 2020

Appearances and goals by club, season and competition
Club	Season	League			National cup		Continental		Other		Total	
Club	Season	Division	Apps	Goals	Apps	Goals	Apps	Goals	Apps	Goals	Apps	Goals
Minneapolis City SC	2016	PLA	2	1	—		—		—		2	1
Des Moines Menace	2018	USL PDL	10	0	—		—		—		10	0
Chicago FC United	2018	USL PDL	10	3	—		—		2 (Note: Appearance(s) in USL PDL Playoffs)	0	12	3
Minneapolis City SC	2019	NPSL	3	0	—		—		—		3	0
Nashville SC	2020	MLS	9	2	—		—		—		9	2
Charlotte Independence (loan)	2020	USL	16	3	—		—		1 (Note: Appearance(s) in USL Championship Playoffs)	0	17	3
Career total			41	7	0	0	0	0	3	0	44	7
