= Diogo Rocha =

Diogo Rocha may refer to:

- Diogo da Rocha (fl. 1525), Portuguese explorer
- Diogo Rocha (tennis) (born 1984), Portuguese tennis player
- Diogo Rocha (footballer) (born 1995), known as "Rochinha", Portuguese football attacking midfielder for Sporting

== See also ==
- Diego Rocha (born 2001), American soccer defender for Charlotte Independence
