= Gabriel Obertan =

French footballer (born 1989)

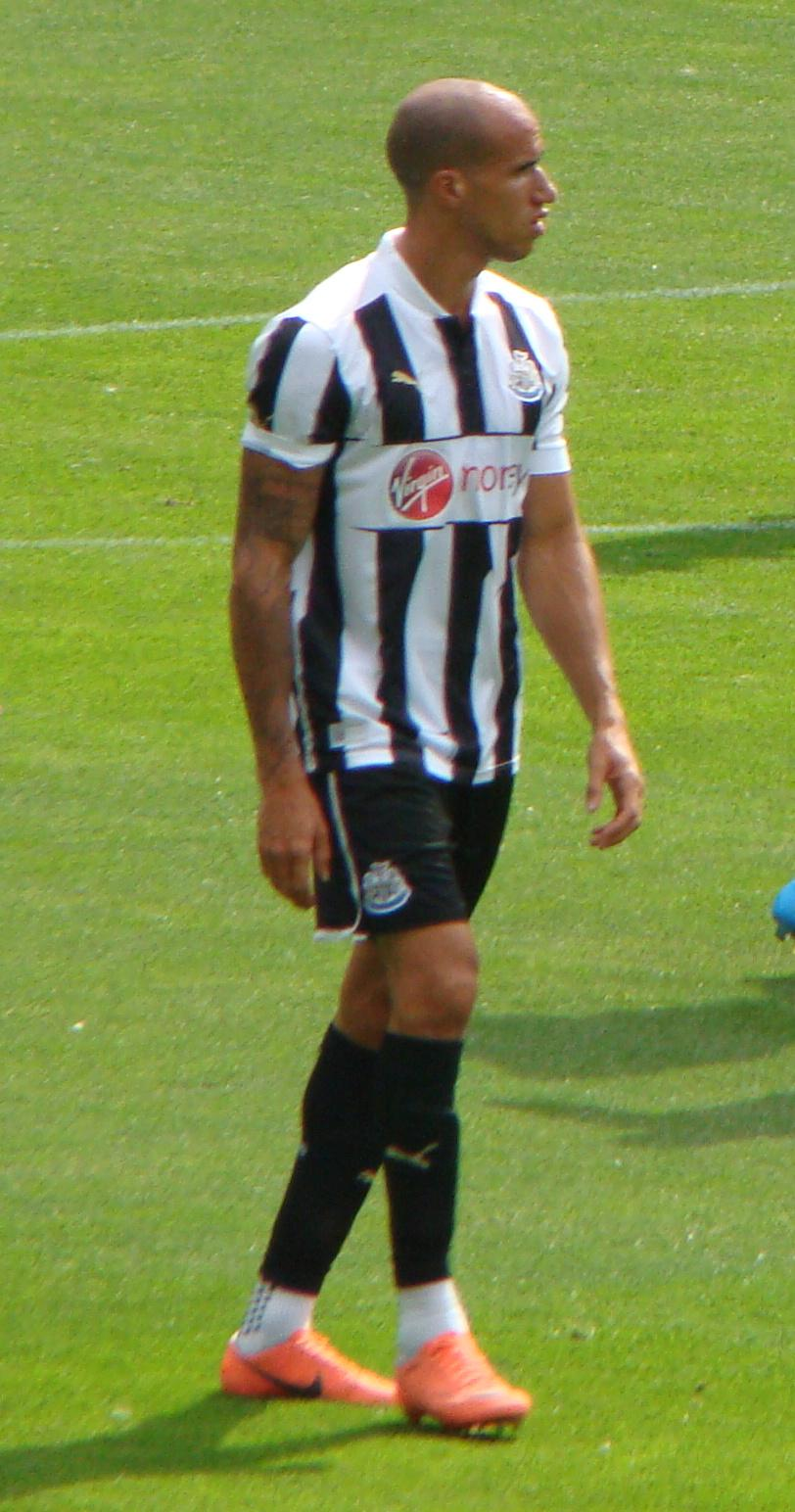
- Obertan playing for Newcastle United in 2012

Personal information
- Full name: Gabriel Antoine Obertan
- Date of birth: 26 February 1989 (age 37)
- Place of birth: Paris, France
- Height: 1.86 m (6 ft 1 in)
- Position: Winger

Team information
- Current team: Charlotte Independence (coach)

Youth career
- 1997–2002: Paris-Pantin
- 2002–2003: Paris
- 2003–2004: Paris-Saint Germain
- 2004–2005: INF Clairefontaine
- 2005–2006: Bordeaux

Senior career*
| Years | Team | Apps | (Gls) |
| 2006–2009 | Bordeaux | 54 | (3) |
| 2009 | → Lorient (loan) | 15 | (1) |
| 2009–2011 | Manchester United | 14 | (0) |
| 2011–2016 | Newcastle United | 58 | (2) |
| 2016–2017 | Anzhi Makhachkala | 8 | (1) |
| 2017 | Wigan Athletic | 12 | (1) |
| 2017–2019 | Levski Sofia | 51 | (5) |
| 2019–2021 | Erzurumspor | 23 | (2) |
| 2021–2025 | Charlotte Independence | 53 | (9) |
| Total | | 288 | (24) |

International career
| 2009–2010 | France U21 | 12 | (1) |
- * Club domestic league appearances and goals

Gabriel Antoine Obertan (born 26 February 1989) is a French professional footballer who plays as a winger.

A former attendee of the famous Clairefontaine academy, Obertan began his professional career playing for Bordeaux in France. He then joined Manchester United in July 2009 for an undisclosed fee, before signing for Newcastle United for another undisclosed fee in August 2011. Obertan was released by Newcastle in May 2016.

Obertan represented his country at under-16, under-17, under-18, under-19 and under-21 level.

== Club career ==
=== Early career ===
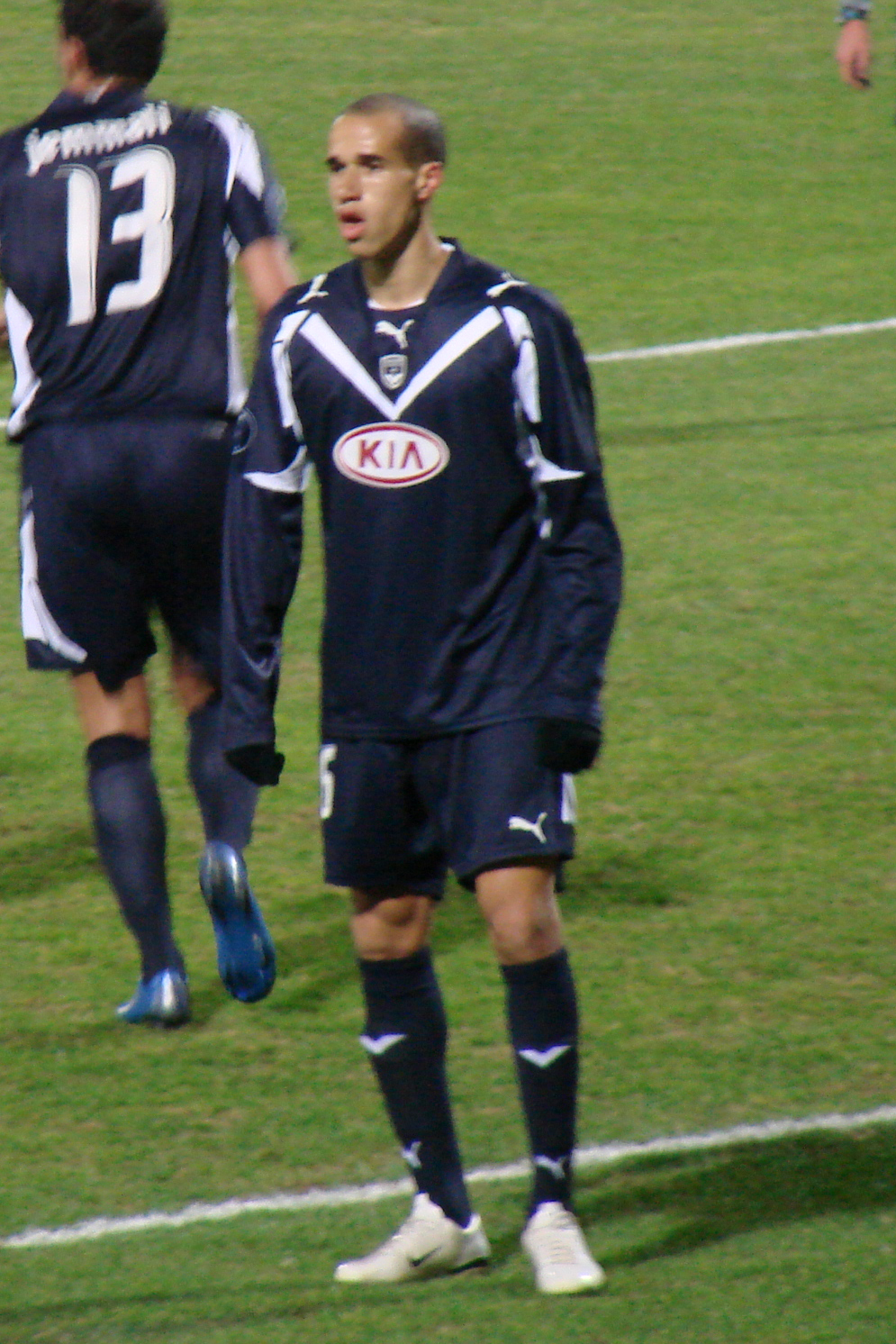
Obertan playing for Bordeaux in 2007

Obertan began his career playing for his local club Paris-Pantin before moving to a higher level joining Paris FC in 2002. After spending a year there, he did what most youths at Paris FC often do and joined Paris-Saint Germain. Following another year of training, he moved to the famed Clairefontaine academy in order to further his development. It was here where he was first spotted by Bordeaux scouts and after one year at Clairefontaine, he moved to Bordeaux to begin training with them.

=== Bordeaux ===
After spending only a year in the reserves, in the 2006–07 season Obertan signed his first professional contract where he was given the number 26 shirt for the senior squad, signing a three-year contract. On 30 September 2006, at the age of 17 he made his professional debut, playing the last 15 minutes of a 2–0 defeat to Valenciennes and made his Champions League debut a month later, in a 3–0 loss against Liverpool. He scored his first goal on 22 April 2007 against Saint-Étienne in a 2–0 away league victory, netting during injury time to seal the win. He made 17 league appearances and a total of 23 matches scoring one goal during his debut season.

The following season, he signed a contract extension and his playing time increased to 37 matches and three goals, though he was still limited to mostly substitute appearances. For the first half of the 2008–09 season, his play was limited again, though he impressed as he scored a brace in Bordeaux's 4–2 win over Guingamp in the Coupe de la Ligue on 11 November 2008. With Bordeaux contending for a title and Obertan not likely to receive playing time, Blanc decided to loan him out to fellow Ligue 1 side Lorient for the rest of the season, where Blanc believed the player would receive more playing time. Bordeaux went on to win the 2008–09 Ligue 1 title in Obertan's absence, though he had already contributed 11 league appearances before he departed on loan.

Obertan scored his first goal for Lorient on 24 January 2009, netting the first in a 2–1 home win over Tours in the Coupe de France campaign. Obertan netted his only league goal for Lorient in a 3–1 away win over Grenoble on 4 April. During his loan spell at Lorient, Obertan made a total of 17 appearances scoring two goals.

=== Manchester United ===
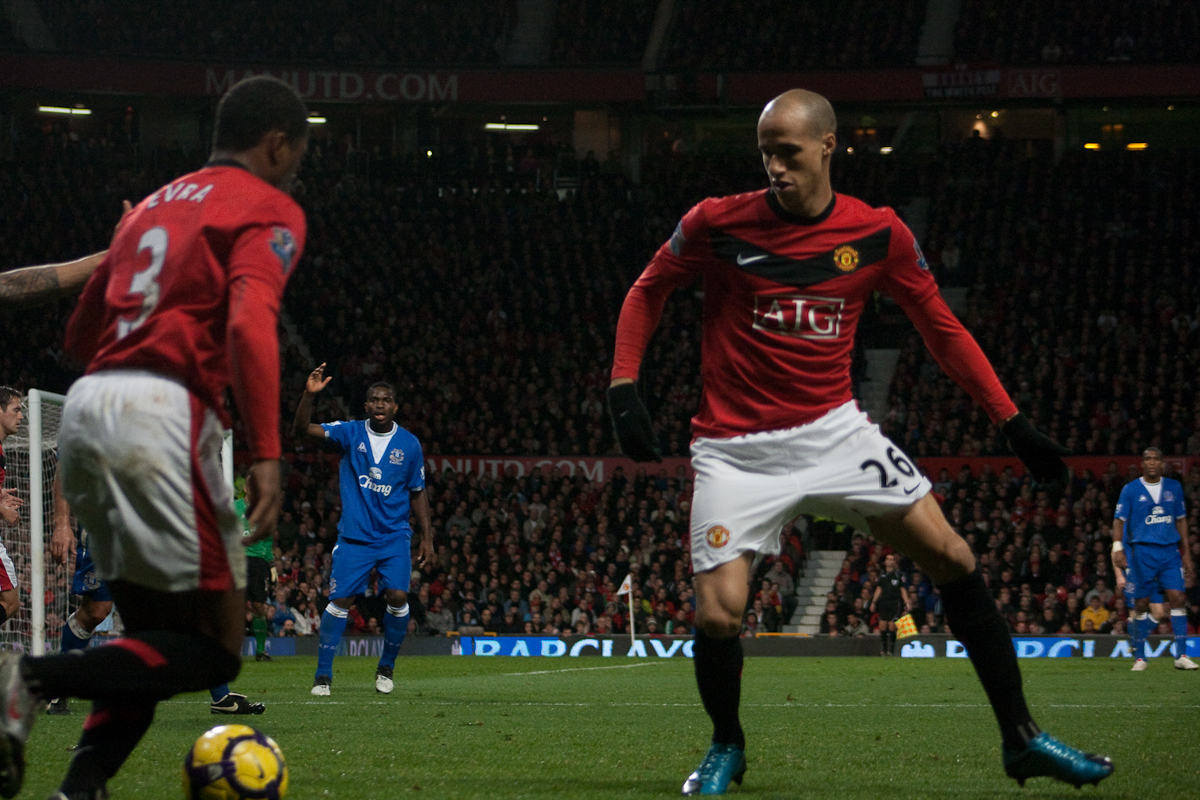
Obertan playing for Manchester United in 2009

On 6 July 2009, French newspaper L'Equipe announced that Bordeaux president Jean-Louis Triaud had reached an agreement with English club Manchester United for the transfer of Obertan with Triaud stating that an agreement had been reached several weeks ago and that the player had agreed contract terms. The following day, Obertan successfully passed his medical in Manchester and, on 8 July, signed his contract officially making him a Manchester United player. The transfer fee was undisclosed, but is believed to be in the region of £3 million, with Obertan joining the club on a four-year deal.

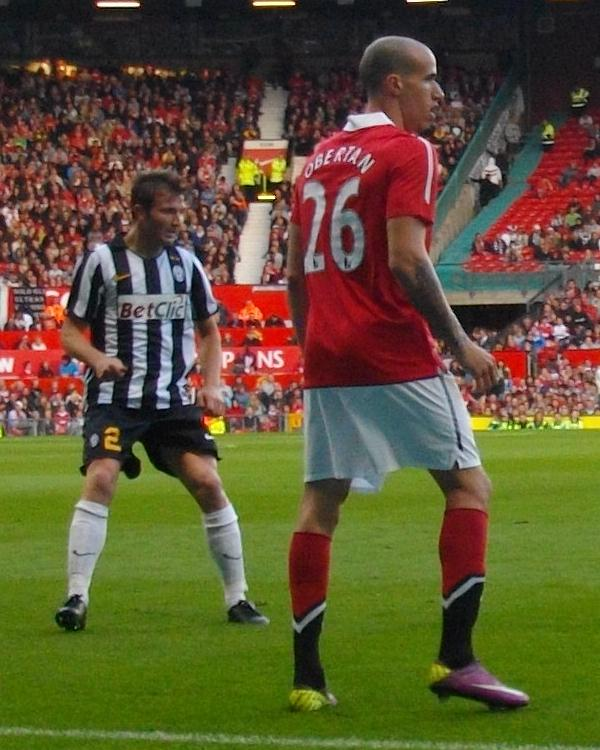
Obertan (right in the number 26 shirt) in a Manchester United shirt during Gary Neville's testimonial game against Juventus

However, at the start of the 2009–10 season, Obertan suffered a setback when he suffered a spinal problem that kept him on the sidelines for a month. Following three games for the Manchester United reserve team, including a 3–0 win over Oldham Athletic on his debut, Obertan made his senior debut in the club's 2–0 away win over Barnsley in the League Cup fourth round on 27 October. He made his Premier League debut for Manchester United on 31 October, coming on as a substitute in the 2–0 win over Blackburn Rovers at Old Trafford. His Champions League debut came that same week, replacing Federico Macheda in the 82nd minute in the 3–3 home draw against CSKA Moscow on 3 November 2009. On 8 December, Obertan set up the second of Michael Owen's hat-trick in a 3–1 away victory at Wolfsburg in the Champions League, taking on 3 players before teeing Owen up for a simple tap-in. On 15 December, Obertan made his first league start for United, being replaced in the 71st minute by Danny Welbeck in a 3–0 home win over Wolves. In his first season at Manchester United, Obertan made 13 appearances in all competitions.

Obertan scored his first goal for United in a 1–0 win over Philadelphia Union on 21 July 2010 on the club's pre-season tour of North America. Just one week later Obertan was forced to miss the start of the new season as he was injured midway through the first half during United's 5–2 victory in the 2010 MLS All-Star Game. On 22 September, Obertan made his return from injury, replacing Javier Hernández in the 68th minute of United's 5–2 away League Cup win over Scunthorpe United. Obertan's first official goal for United came on 2 November, netting the second of a 3–0 away win over Bursaspor in the Champions League, this also being Obertan's first European goal.

Ahead of the 2011–12 season, with his first team place increasingly limited, Newcastle United confirmed their interest in signing Obertan as a direct replacement for Joey Barton, as Manchester United planned a rebuild of their squad.

=== Newcastle United ===
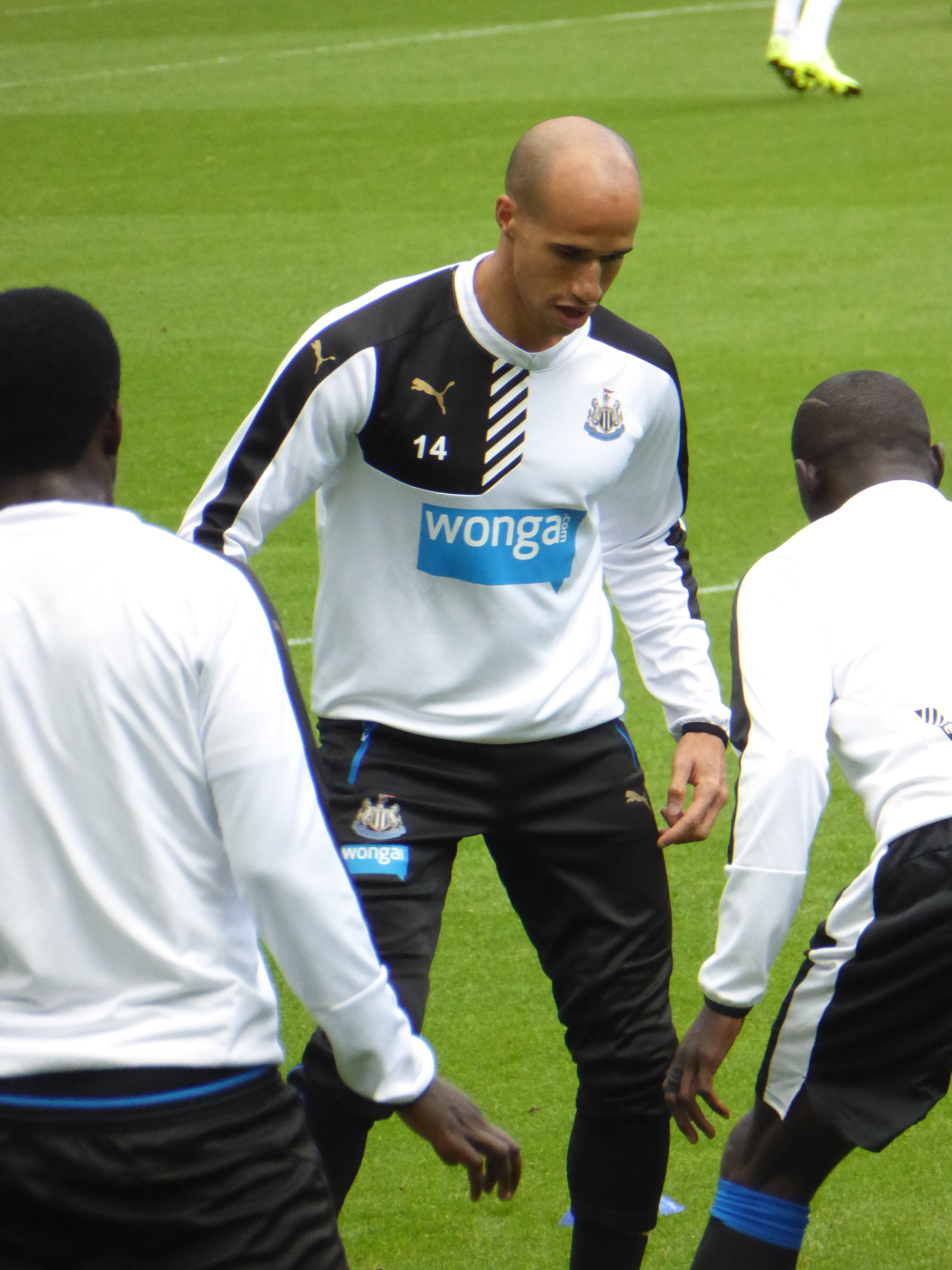
Obertan training for Newcastle United ahead of a match against Arsenal in 2015

Obertan signed for Premier League club Newcastle United on a five-year contract on 9 August 2011, for an undisclosed fee believed to be approximately £3 million.

He made his debut on 13 August as a half-time substitute at home to Arsenal. Obertan provided an assist for Demba Ba, before being substituted in the 65th minute, in a 3–1 win over Stoke City on 31 October 2011. After the match, it was revealed that Obertan had an infection in his toe and was sidelined for some weeks. On 26 November 2011, Obertan returned to Old Trafford with Newcastle in a fixture against Manchester United in a 1–1 draw. Obertan later came under criticism from Newcastle United supporters as he failed to make a significant impression in the first half of the season. He lost his place in the starting 11 to fellow Frenchman Hatem Ben Arfa. He scored his first goal for Newcastle on 1 February 2012 in the 2–0 victory against Blackburn Rovers after coming on as a sub just four minutes before. Obertan provided an assist for Ben Afra, in a 2–1 loss against Arsenal on 12 March 2012. However, Obertan was once again injured when he suffered ankle injury that kept him out for a month. He made his return to the first team coming on as a late substitute in a 2–0 win over Chelsea on 2 May 2012. Obertan finished the 2011–12 season, making 23 appearances and scoring once.

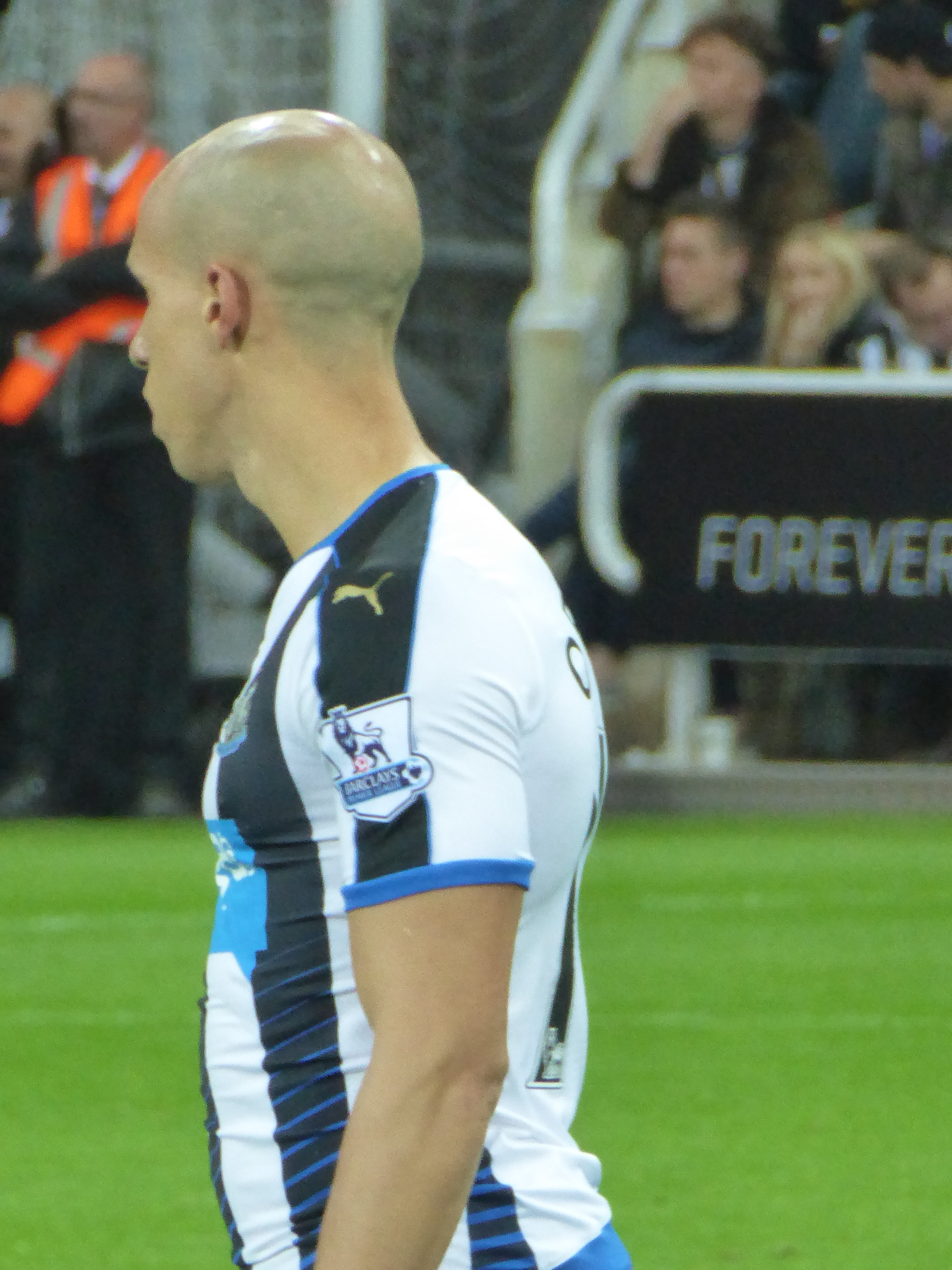
Obertan in a match against Sheffield Wednesday in the third round of League Cup

Ahead of the 2012–13 season, manager Alan Pardew expected Obertan to make an impact, which Obertan hoping to reproduce his same form in the previous season. Obertan scored his first goal of the 2012–13 season with a low drive against Belgian side Club Brugge in the Europa League on 25 October. However, Obertan failed to make an impact once again, due to unused substitute, absent from the squad and was often sent to the reserve. After making his return against QPR, Obertan provided an assist in each of Newcastle's first two games after Christmas, against Manchester United and Arsenal, though both finished in defeats. Obertan later finished the season, making 14 appearances.

In the 2013–14 season saw Obertan's first team opportunities limited further and made his first appearance of the season on 25 September 2013, in a 2–0 win over Leeds United in the third round of League Cup, where he played for 30 minutes. After the match, manager Pardew stated Obertan still has a future at the club After his hopes of being loaned out to Ligue 1 side Evian was never materialised, Obertan suffered knocks, which soon kept him out for months. Despite this, Obertan finished the season, making three appearances.

In the 2014–15 season, Obertan was among several players to be available for transfers and expected to leave, but stayed, as no suitors came forward to sign him over his wages. In the pre-season, Obertan made an impressive display and scored in a 3–1 loss against Málaga on 2 August 2014. This prompted Pardew to respond, who praised Obertan's performance. Obertan then made his first league appearance in almost a year, playing 27 minutes, in a 2–0 loss against Manchester City in the opening game of the season. Obertan scored his first Newcastle United goal in two years, at St James' Park, with a 1–0 win over Leicester City on 18 October 2014. In a match against Liverpool on 1 November 2014, Obertan sustained a thigh injury that kept him out between 3–4 months. After returning to training in January, Obertan made his return to the first team, playing 21 minutes, in a 1–1 draw against Stoke City on 8 February 2015. Obertan later finished the 2014–15 season, making 13 appearances and scoring once.

In the 2015–16 season, Obertan expressed his desire to stay at the club under the new management of Steve McClaren after the talks between the pair went well. In the opening game of the season, Obertan provided an assist for newly signing Georginio Wijnaldum to score, in a 2–2 draw against Southampton. His last outing for Newcastle United was on 26 September 2015 in a 2–2 draw at home to Chelsea, appearing as a 54th-minute substitute replacing the injured Jack Colback. However, Obertan suffered a hamstring injury in training and after undergoing a surgery, it was announced that Obertan would be sidelined for three months. Up until late-March, Obertan remained on the sidelines and soon made his return to training.

On 5 May 2016, Newcastle United announced that Obertan and team-mate Sylvain Marveaux had been released.

=== Anzhi Makhachkala ===
On 24 August 2016, he signed a two-year contract with the Russian side Anzhi Makhachkala. Reflecting to his move to Anzhi Makhachkala, Obertan revealed that Lassana Diarra, who used to play for Anzhi, helped him with a move to Russia and vowed to help the club to win trophies.

Obertan made his Anzhi Makhackala debut, where he played 63 minutes before being substituted for Lorenzo Ebecilio, in a 2–0 loss against Spartak Moscow on 28 August 2016. Three weeks later on 17 September 2016, Obertan scored his first Anzhi Makhackala goal, in a 1–0 away win over Ural Yekaterinburg. However, Obertan soon suffered an injury after sustaining a meniscus injury that kept him out for a month. At the end of 2016, Anzhi was sold to a different owner who significantly reduced club's spending and Obertan was released from his contract by mutual consent.

=== Wigan Athletic ===
On 31 January 2017, Obertan returned to England, signing with Wigan Athletic. He scored his first goal for Wigan in a 3–2 win over Rotherham United on 8 April 2017. Following relegation to EFL League One, Obertan was one of four players released by the club.

=== Levski Sofia ===
On 20 July 2017, Obertan signed a two-year contract with Bulgarian club Levski Sofia and was given the number 32 shirt. He made his debut on 30 July, coming on as a substitute in the 2–0 win over Vitosha Bistritsa at Georgi Asparuhov Stadium. He scored his first goal for Levski on 15 September in the 2–0 victory against Septemvri Sofia. Obertan finished the 2017–18 season, making 31 appearances and scoring four goals.

In July 2018, Obertan was announced as the 3rd captain. He captained Levski for the first time in a 2–2 home draw against Cherno More Varna on 30 July 2018. Obertan signed a new two-year contract in October 2018 to keep him at Levski until 2021.

=== Erzurumspor ===
On 31 January 2019, Obertan was sold to Turkish Süper Lig side Erzurumspor. He signed for two and a half years.

=== Charlotte Independence ===
On 19 August 2021, Obertan signed with US side Charlotte Independence who played in the second-tier USL Championship in 2021. After starting 2022 on trial with MLS expansion side Charlotte FC, Obertan re-signed with the Independence for the remainder of the 2022 season on 16 June 2022.

== International career ==
Obertan has been active with France on the youth level. He has received caps with the under-16s, under-17s, under-18s, and the under-19s. With the under-16s, Obertan made 10 appearances scoring only one goal. The following season, he played with the under-17s making 12 appearances and scoring three goals. Obertan and the team failed to qualify for the 2006 UEFA European Under-17 Football Championship, due to their second-place finish in the Elite Round. With the under-18s, Obertan made nine total appearances, but failed to get on the scoresheet. He rarely played with the under-19 team making just two appearances and scoring his lone goal against Sweden in a 2–1 victory during the 2008 UEFA European Under-19 Football Championship elite qualification round.

Obertan earned his first cap with the under-21 team on 11 February 2009 against Tunisia. On 31 March 2009, he scored his first under-21 goal against the England under-21s in a friendly at the City Ground in Nottingham.

== Coaching career ==
He works as a coach at Charlotte Independence.

== Personal life ==
Obertan was born in Paris. He decided to become a footballer after watching the World Cup final, which saw France beat Brazil 3–0. While growing up, his father worked at IKEA and his mother worked for the organisation in Environmental Research. Obertan is of Guadeloupean descent through his father.

== Career statistics ==
As of 4 March 2024

Appearances and goals by club, season and competition
| Club | Season | League | | | National cup (Note: Includes Coupe de France, FA Cup, Bulgarian Cup, Turkish Cup and U.S. Open Cup) | | League cup (Note: Includes Coupe de la Ligue and EFL Cup) | | Europe | | Other | | Total | |
| Club | Season | Division | Apps | Goals | Apps | Goals | Apps | Goals | Apps | Goals | Apps | Goals | Apps | Goals |
|---|---|---|---|---|---|---|---|---|---|---|---|---|---|---|
| Bordeaux | 2006–07 | Ligue 1 | 17 | 1 | 1 | 0 | 1 | 0 | 4 (Note: Appearances in UEFA Champions League) | 0 | 0 | 0 | 23 | 1 |
| Bordeaux | 2007–08 | Ligue 1 | 26 | 2 | 3 | 0 | 1 | 1 | 7 (Note: Appearances in UEFA Europa League) | 0 | 0 | 0 | 37 | 3 |
| Bordeaux | 2008–09 | Ligue 1 | 11 | 0 | 1 | 0 | 1 | 2 | 5 | 0 | 1 (Note: Appearance in Trophée des Champions) | 0 | 19 | 2 |
| Bordeaux | Total | | 54 | 3 | 5 | 0 | 3 | 3 | 16 | 0 | 1 | 0 | 79 | 6 |
| Lorient (loan) | 2008–09 | Ligue 1 | 15 | 1 | 2 | 1 | 0 | 0 | – | | – | | 17 | 2 |
| Manchester United | 2009–10 | Premier League | 7 | 0 | 1 | 0 | 2 | 0 | 3 | 0 | 0 | 0 | 13 | 0 |
| Manchester United | 2010–11 | Premier League | 7 | 0 | 2 | 0 | 3 | 0 | 3 | 1 | 0 | 0 | 15 | 1 |
| Manchester United | Total | | 14 | 0 | 3 | 0 | 5 | 0 | 6 | 1 | 0 | 0 | 28 | 1 |
| Newcastle United | 2011–12 | Premier League | 23 | 1 | 0 | 0 | 2 | 0 | – | | – | | 25 | 1 |
| Newcastle United | 2012–13 | Premier League | 14 | 0 | 1 | 0 | 1 | 0 | 8 | 1 | – | | 24 | 1 |
| Newcastle United | 2013–14 | Premier League | 3 | 0 | 1 | 0 | 1 | 0 | 0 | 0 | – | | 5 | 0 |
| Newcastle United | 2014–15 | Premier League | 13 | 1 | 0 | 0 | 3 | 0 | 0 | 0 | – | | 16 | 1 |
| Newcastle United | 2015–16 | Premier League | 5 | 0 | 0 | 0 | 1 | 0 | 0 | 0 | – | | 6 | 0 |
| Newcastle United | Total | | 58 | 2 | 2 | 0 | 8 | 0 | 8 | 1 | 0 | 0 | 76 | 3 |
| Anzhi Makhachkala | 2016–17 | Russian Premier League | 8 | 1 | 0 | 0 | – | | 0 | 0 | 0 | 0 | 8 | 1 |
| Wigan Athletic | 2016–17 | Championship | 12 | 1 | 0 | 0 | 0 | 0 | – | | – | | 12 | 1 |
| Levski Sofia | 2017–18 | First League | 31 | 4 | 5 | 0 | – | | 0 | 0 | – | | 36 | 4 |
| Levski Sofia | 2018–19 | First League | 20 | 1 | 1 | 0 | – | | 2 | 0 | – | | 23 | 1 |
| Levski Sofia | Total | | 51 | 5 | 6 | 0 | 0 | 0 | 2 | 0 | 0 | 0 | 59 | 5 |
| Erzurumspor | 2018–19 | Süper Lig | 10 | 1 | 0 | 0 | – | | – | | – | | 10 | 1 |
| Erzurumspor | 2019–20 | Süper Lig | 13 | 1 | 1 | 0 | – | | – | | – | | 14 | 1 |
| Erzurumspor | Total | | 23 | 2 | 1 | 0 | 0 | 0 | 0 | 0 | 0 | 0 | 24 | 2 |
| Charlotte Independence | 2021 | USL Championship | 15 | 5 | – | | – | | – | | – | | 15 | 5 |
| Charlotte Independence | 2022 | USL League One | 16 | 4 | – | | – | | – | | – | | 16 | 4 |
| Charlotte Independence | 2023 | USL League One | 28 | 4 | 1 | 0 | – | | – | | – | | 29 | 4 |
| Charlotte Independence | Total | | 59 | 13 | 1 | 0 | – | | – | | – | | 60 | 13 |
| Career total | | | 294 | 28 | 20 | 1 | 16 | 3 | 32 | 2 | 1 | 0 | 363 | 34 |

== Honours ==
Bordeaux

- Trophée des Champions: 2008
