= Oscar Ramsay =

New Zealand footballer (born 1997)

Personal information
- Full name: Oscar Ramsay
- Date of birth: 22 May 1997 (age 29)
- Place of birth: Auckland, New Zealand
- Height: 5 ft 10 in (1.78 m)
- Position: Midfielder

Team information
- Current team: Western Springs

Youth career
- Central United
- Auckland City

College career
Years	Team	Apps	(Gls)
2016–2019	Hofstra Pride	73	(6)

Senior career*
Years	Team	Apps	(Gls)
2017	GPS Portland Phoenix	13	(0)
2018	Reading United	6	(0)
2019	Lionsbridge	5	(1)
2020	Charlotte Independence	4	(0)
2021–	Western Springs	63	(12)

International career
- New Zealand U20
- * Club domestic league appearances and goals as of 17 November 2024

Oscar Ramsay (born 22 May 1997) is a New Zealand professional footballer who plays as a midfielder for New Zealand club North Shore United in the Northern League.

== Club career ==
Born in Auckland, Ramsay began playing organised football at the age of five for the youth teams at Western Springs. He played a few years at Western Springs before joining Joga Bonita and Wynrs Wynton Rufer Academy. Ramsay then went on to play for Central United and youth team at Auckland City before moving to the United States.

In 2016, Ramsay enrolled at Hofstra University and joined the Hofstra Pride soccer team. During his four seasons at Hofstra, Ramsay played 73 matches and scored six goals. While at Hofstra, Ramsay played for GPS Portland Phoenix, Reading United and Lionsbridge in the USL League Two in 2017, 2018 and 2019 respectively. At Portland, Ramsay made 13 appearances and tallied 5 assists. With Reading United, Ramsay played in six matches without scoring a goal. At Lionsbridge, Ramsay played in five matches and scored one goal on 6 July 2019 against North Carolina Fusion U23.

After leaving Hofstra, Ramsay signed with USL Championship side Charlotte Independence. He made his professional debut for the club on 23 August 2020 against Miami. He came on as an 84th-minute substitute for Jake Areman as Charlotte were defeated 2–1.

== International career ==
Ramsay has represented New Zealand at the under-20 level.

== Career statistics ==
=== Club ===
As of match played 17 November 2024

Appearances and goals by club, season and competition
Club	Season	League			Cup		Continental		Total	
Club	Season	Division	Apps	Goals	Apps	Goals	Apps	Goals	Apps	Goals
GPS Portland Phoenix	2017	USL League Two	13	0	—	—	—	—	13	0
Reading United	2018	USL League Two	6	0	—	—	—	—	6	0
Lionsbridge	2019	USL League Two	5	1	—	—	—	—	5	1
Charlotte Independence	2020	USL Championship	1	0	—	—	—	—	1	0
Western Springs	2022	National League	20	2	—	—	—	—	20	2
Western Springs	2023	National League	21	7	—	—	—	—	21	7
Western Springs	2024	National League	22	3	—	—	—	—	22	3
Western Springs	Total		63	12	0	0	0	0	63	12
Career total			88	13	0	0	0	0	88	13
