= Héctor Acosta (footballer, born 2000) =

Venezuelan footballer

Personal information
- Full name: Héctor Andrés Acosta Di Gregorio
- Date of birth: 17 July 2000 (age 26)
- Place of birth: Venezuela
- Height: 1.86 m (6 ft 1 in)
- Position: Defender

Team information
- Current team: Estudiantes de Mérida
- Number: 25

Senior career*
Years	Team	Apps	(Gls)
2019	Llaneros	23	(1)
2020	Gran Valencia	15	(1)
2021	UCV	9	(1)
2022–2023	Charlotte Independence	47	(2)
2024–	Estudiantes de Mérida	49	
- * Club domestic league appearances and goals as of 17 November 2026

Héctor Andrés Acosta Di Gregorio (17 July 2000) is a Venezuelan footballer who plays as a defender for Estudiantes de Mérida.

== Career ==
=== Charlotte Independence ===
On 15 February 2022, Acosta signed with USL League One club Charlotte Independence.

=== Estudiantes de Mérida ===
On 1 March 2024, Acosta signed for Estudiantes de Mérida returning back to his country.
