= Iván Luquetta =

American soccer player

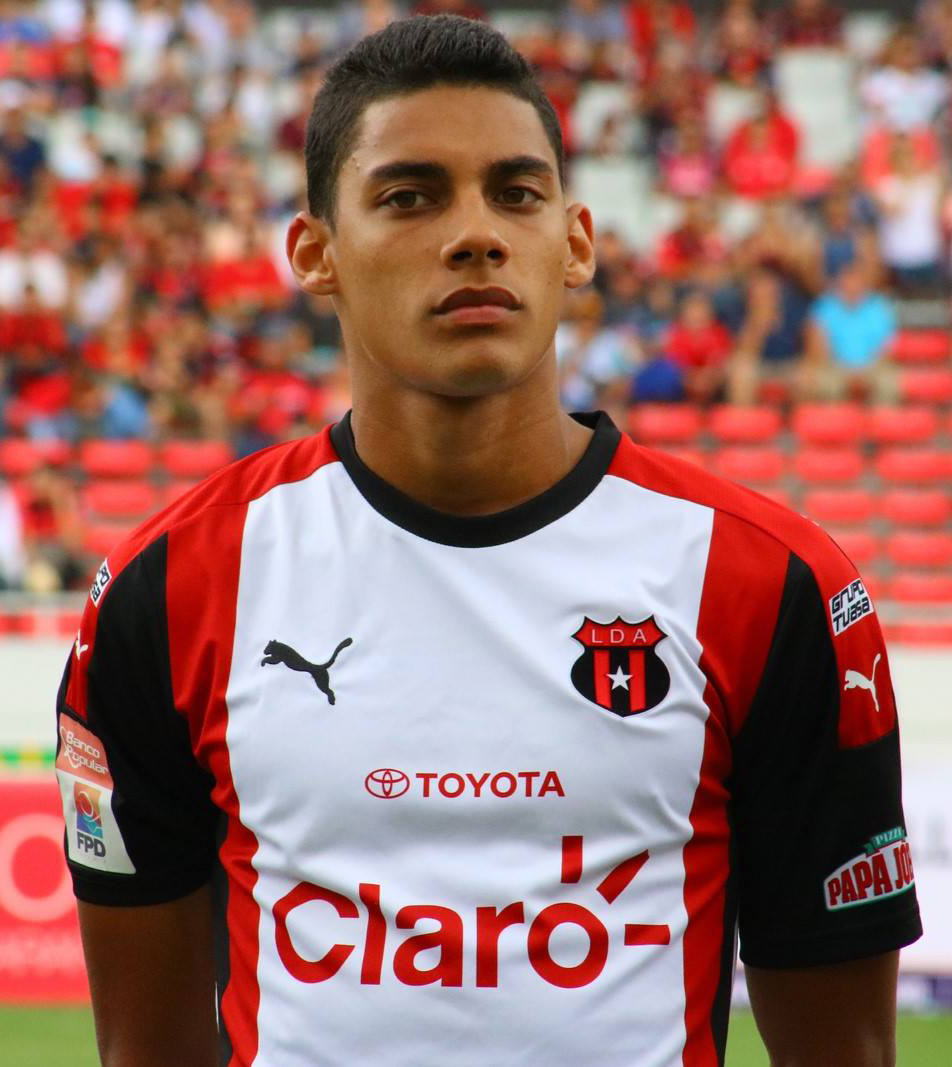
- Iván Luquetta in 2017

Personal information
- Full name: Iván Andre Luquetta Tuñón
- Date of birth: May 5, 1996 (age 30)
- Place of birth: Houston, Texas, United States
- Height: 1.76 m (5 ft 9 in)
- Position: Forward

Team information
- Current team: Charlotte Independence
- Number: 9

Senior career*
Years	Team	Apps	(Gls)
2017	Alajuelense	4	(0)
2018–2019	Barranquilla	34	(8)
2019	Junior	1	(0)
2020	Patriotas	4	(0)
2021	Academia Cantolao	12	(1)
2022	Charlotte Independence	14	(2)
2024	Real Potosí		
2026–	ASC New Stars		
- * Club domestic league appearances and goals as of October 16, 2022

Iván Andre Luquetta Tuñón (May 5, 1996) is an American soccer player who plays as a forward for ASC New Stars.

== Career ==
=== Charlotte Independence ===
On March 3, 2022, Luquetta signed with USL League One club Charlotte Independence.
