= Jeando Fuchs =

Cameroonian footballer (born 1997)

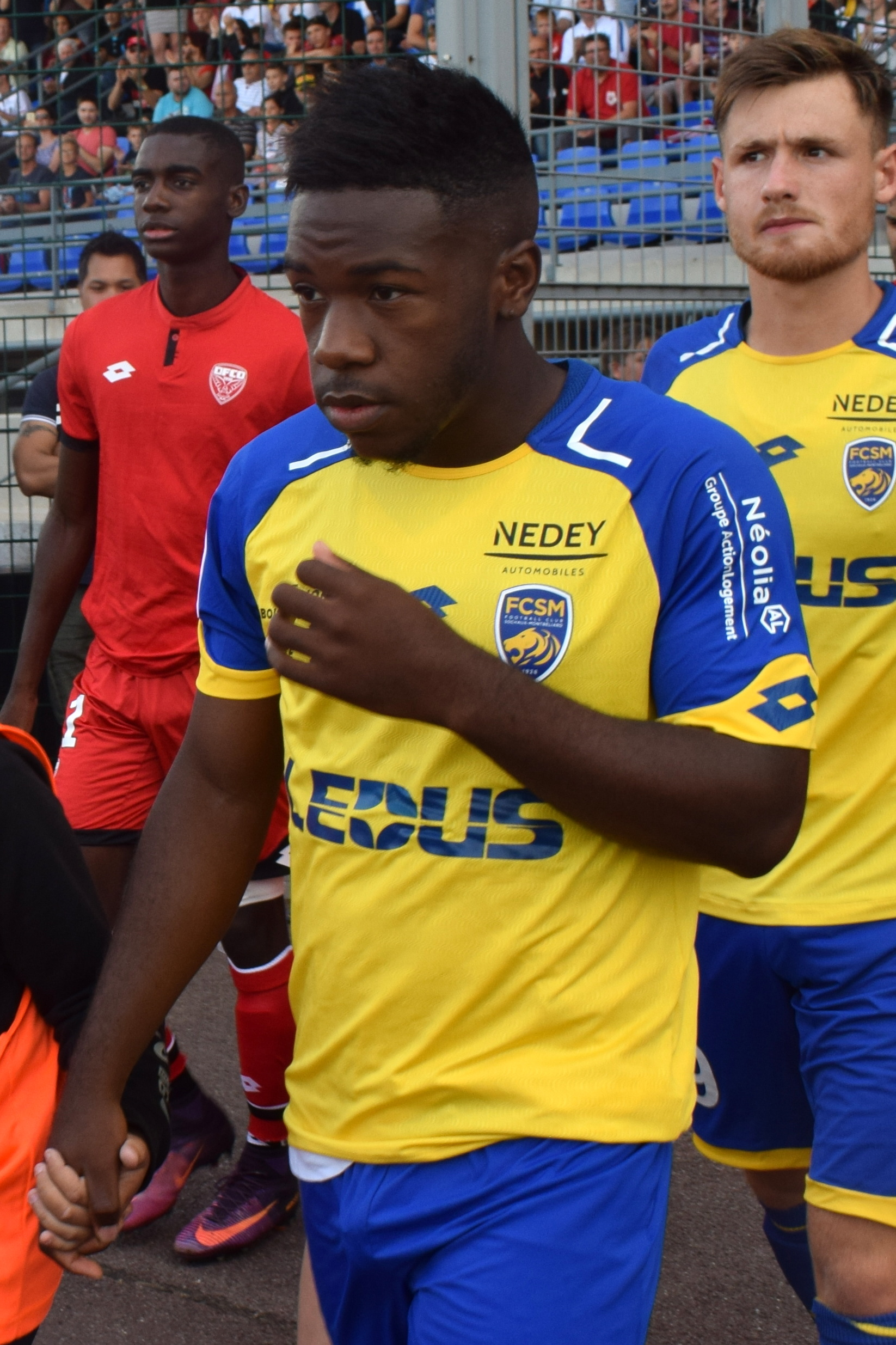
- Fuchs in 2017

Personal information
- Full name: Jeando Pourrat Fuchs
- Date of birth: 11 October 1997 (age 29)
- Place of birth: Yaoundé, Cameroon
- Height: 1.74 m (5 ft 9 in)
- Position: Midfielder

Team information
- Current team: Charlotte Independence
- Number: 6

Youth career
- 2004–2007: US Hesingue
- 2007–2008: FC Bartenheim
- 2008–2010: US Hesingue
- 2010–2011: Saint-Louis Neuweg
- 2011–2014: Mulhouse

Senior career*
Years	Team	Apps	(Gls)
2014–2019	Sochaux II	29	(0)
2015–2019	Sochaux	105	(5)
2019–2020	Alavés	0	(0)
2019–2020	→ Maccabi Haifa (loan)	6	(0)
2020–2022	Dundee United	38	(0)
2022–2024	Peterborough United	45	(0)
2024–2025	Bnei Sakhnin	27	(0)
2025–2026	Gabala	3	(0)
2026–	Charlotte Independence	15	(0)

International career^{‡}
2016	France U19	9	(0)
2016–2017	France U20	5	(0)
2018–	Cameroon	2	(0)
- * Club domestic league appearances and goals as of 30 October 2026 ‡ National team caps and goals as of 07:21, 18 August 2020 (UTC)

Jeando Pourrat Fuchs (born 11 October 1997) is a Cameroonian professional footballer who plays as a midfielder for USL League One side Charlotte Independence, and the Cameroon national team.

== Club career ==
Fuchs started his senior career with French club Sochaux. He made over 100 league appearances for the club before moving to Spanish club Alavés in 2019. Alavés loaned him to Israeli club Maccabi Haifa during the 2019–20 season.

In October 2020, Fuchs signed a two-year contract with Scottish club Dundee United.

On 28 January 2022, Fuchs joined Championship side Peterborough United for an undisclosed fee, signing a two-and-a-half-year deal with the club.

On 12 May 2024, the club announced he would be released in the summer when his contract expired "after a stop-start campaign due to injuries".

On 25 August 2024 signed for Bnei Sakhnin.

On 10 September 2025, Azerbaijan Premier League club Qabala announced the signing of Fuchs to a one-year contract. On 27 January 2026, Gabala announced the departure from the club of Fuchs by mutual consent.

On 30 April 2026, Fuchs signed with American third-tier side Charlotte Independence of the USL League One.

== International career ==
Fuchs represented the France national youth teams up until the France U20, but chose to represent Cameroon on the senior level. He made his debut for Cameroon on 20 November 2018 in a friendly against Brazil, as a starter.

== Career statistics ==
As of match played 18 October 2026

Appearances and goals by club, season and competition
Club	Season	League			Cup		League Cup		Other		Total	
Club	Season	Division	Apps	Goals	Apps	Goals	Apps	Goals	Apps	Goals	Apps	Goals
Sochaux II	2014–15	Championnat de France Amateur	21	0	—		—		—		21	0
Sochaux II	2015–16	Championnat de France Amateur	8	0	—		—		—		8	0
Sochaux II	Total		29	0	0	0	0	0	0	0	29	0
Sochaux	2014–15	Ligue 2	1	0	0	0	0	0	—		1	0
Sochaux	2015–16	Ligue 2	24	0	5	0	0	0	—		29	0
Sochaux	2016–17	Ligue 2	27	2	0	0	4	0	—		31	2
Sochaux	2017–18	Ligue 2	31	1	4	0	1	0	—		36	1
Sochaux	2018–19	Ligue 2	22	2	1	0	0	0	—		23	2
Sochaux	Total		105	5	10	0	5	0	0	0	120	5
Alavés	2019–20	La Liga	0	0	0	0	—		—		0	0
Maccabi Haifa (loan)	2019–20	Israeli Premier League	6	0	1	0	—		0	0	7	0
Dundee United	2020–21	Scottish Premiership	20	0	4	0	1	0	—		25	0
Dundee United	2021–22	Scottish Premiership	18	0	0	0	5	0	—		23	0
Dundee United	Total		38	0	4	0	6	0	0	0	48	0
Peterborough United	2021–22	Championship	18	0	2	0	0	0	0	0	20	0
Peterborough United	2022–23	League One	22	0	3	0	2	0	0	0	27	0
Peterborough United	2023–24	League One	5	0	5	0	1	0	0	0	6	0
Peterborough United	Total		45	0	10	0	3	0	0	0	53	0
Bnei Sakhnin	2024–25	Israeli Premier League	27	0	3	0	0	0	0	0	30	0
Gabala	2025–26	Azerbaijan Premier League	3	0	1	0	-		-		4	0
Charlotte Independence	2026	USL League One	15	0	1	0	-		-		16	0
Career total			268	5	30	0	14	0	0	0	307	5

== Honours ==
France U19

- UEFA European Under-19 Championship: 2016
