= Ayrton Páez =

Venezuelan footballer (born 1995)

Personal information
- Full name: Ayrton Andrés Páez Yepez
- Date of birth: 16 January 1995 (age 31)
- Place of birth: Mérida, Venezuela
- Height: 1.82 m (6 ft 0 in)
- Position: Midfielder

Youth career
- Mallorca

Senior career*
Years	Team	Apps	(Gls)
2014–2015	Mallorca B	0	(0)
2015–2016	Atlético Malagueño	15	(1)
2016	Sabadell	1	(0)
2017	Numancia B	13	(4)
2017–2018	Atarfe Industrial	18	(0)
2018	Monagas	4	(0)
2018–2019	Loja	31	(1)
2019–2021	Estudiantes de Mérida	49	(6)
2022–2023	Charlotte Independence	14	(0)
2023	Estudiantes de Mérida	6	(0)
2023–2025	Atlètic Club d'Escaldes	14	(1)
- * Club domestic league appearances and goals as of 29 March 2024

Ayrton Andrés Páez Yepez (born 16 January 1995) is a Venezuelan professional footballer who plays as a midfielder.

== Career ==
In 2015, Páez joined the reserves of Spanish La Liga side Málaga.

Before the second half of 2016/17, he signed for the reserves of Spanish second division club Numancia from Sabadell in the Spanish third division due to lack of playing time.

In 2017, he signed for Spanish fourth division team Loja.

In 2018, Páez signed for Monagas in Venezuela.

On 18 February 2022, Páez signed with USL League One side Charlotte Independence.
