= Diego Rocha =

American soccer player

Personal information
- Date of birth: May 8, 2001 (age 25)
- Place of birth: Laredo, Texas, United States
- Height: 6 ft 2 in (1.88 m)
- Position: Defender

Youth career
- 2019–2020: Rio Grande Valley FC

Senior career*
Years	Team	Apps	(Gls)
2020–2021	Rio Grande Valley FC	3	(0)
2022	Charlotte Independence	21	(0)
2025	Lonestar SC		
2026	Hill Country Lobos		
- * Club domestic league appearances and goals as of October 16, 2022

Diego Rocha (born May 8, 2001) is an American professional soccer player.

== Career ==
=== Youth ===
Rocha spent a season with the Rio Grande Valley FC academy from 2019.

=== Professional ===
On March 7, 2020, Rocha joined Rio Grande Valley FC's USL Championship roster. He made his professional debut on July 25, 2020, starting in a 1–0 loss to San Antonio FC.

On April 7, 2022, Rocha signed with USL League One club Charlotte Independence.
