= Kevin Riascos =

Colombian footballer (born 1995)

Personal information
- Full name: Kevin Stuar Riascos Segura
- Date of birth: 21 June 1995 (age 31)
- Place of birth: Bogotá, Colombia
- Height: 1.88 m (6 ft 2 in)
- Position: Defender

Team information
- Current team: Charlotte Independence
- Number: 22

Senior career*
| Years | Team | Apps | (Gls) |
| 2014 | Llaneros | 11 | (0) |
| 2015 | Uniautónoma | 0 | (0) |
| 2017 | Barranquilla | 9 | (0) |
| 2018 | FC Arizona | 6 | (2) |
| 2018 | FC Golden State Force | 2 | (0) |
| 2019–2020 | Jaguares de Córdoba | 28 | (2) |
| 2021 | Patriotas Boyacá | 0 | (0) |
| 2021 | Charlotte Independence | 30 | (0) |
| 2022 | Deportivo Pasto | 37 | (1) |
| 2023 | Deportivo Cali | 6 | (0) |
| 2024 | Sonoma Valley United FC | 7 | (0) |
| 2024 | Jaguares de Córdoba | 3 | (0) |
| 2025 | Boyacá Chicó | 14 | (0) |
| 2025 | Hapoel Haifa | 0 | (0) |
| 2026– | Charlotte Independence | 13 | (0) |
- * Club domestic league appearances and goals as of October 31, 2026

Kevin Stuar Riascos Segura (born 21 June 1995) is a Colombian professional footballer who plays as a defender for USL League One club Charlotte Independence.

== Club career ==
=== Charlotte Independence ===
On 19 March 2021, Riascos signed with USL Championship side Charlotte Independence. He made his debut on 1 May 2021, starting against Tampa Bay Rowdies.
