= Jake Areman =

American soccer player

Personal information
- Full name: Jake E. Areman
- Date of birth: March 9, 1996 (age 30)
- Place of birth: West Long Branch, New Jersey, United States
- Height: 5 ft 9 in (1.75 m)
- Position: Midfielder

College career
Years	Team	Apps	(Gls)
2014–2015	Maryland Terrapins	20	(1)
2016–2017	Monmouth Hawks	36	(4)

Senior career*
Years	Team	Apps	(Gls)
2017	New York Red Bulls U-23	5	(1)
2018–2021	Charlotte Independence	81	(4)
2022–2023	Tampa Bay Rowdies	36	(3)
- * Club domestic league appearances and goals as of November 8, 2023

Jake E. Areman (born March 9, 1996) is an American retired soccer player.

Raised in Freehold Township, New Jersey, Areman played prep soccer at Colts Neck High School.

== Career ==
=== College and amateur ===
Areman played college soccer at the University of Maryland from 2013 to 2014, before transferring to Monmouth University in 2015.

While at college, Areman also appeared for USL PDL club New York Red Bulls U-23 in 2017.

=== Professional ===
Areman signed with United Soccer League side Charlotte Independence on March 1, 2018. He scored his first professional goal on August 25, 2018, against North Carolina FC.

Following Charlotte's self-relegation to USL League One, Areman remained in the USL Championship by signing with the Tampa Bay Rowdies. Areman was released by the Rowdies following the 2023 season.

Areman announced his retirement from the professional game in a thread on his personal Twitter account on January 17, 2024.
