= Clay Dimick =

American soccer player (born 1994)

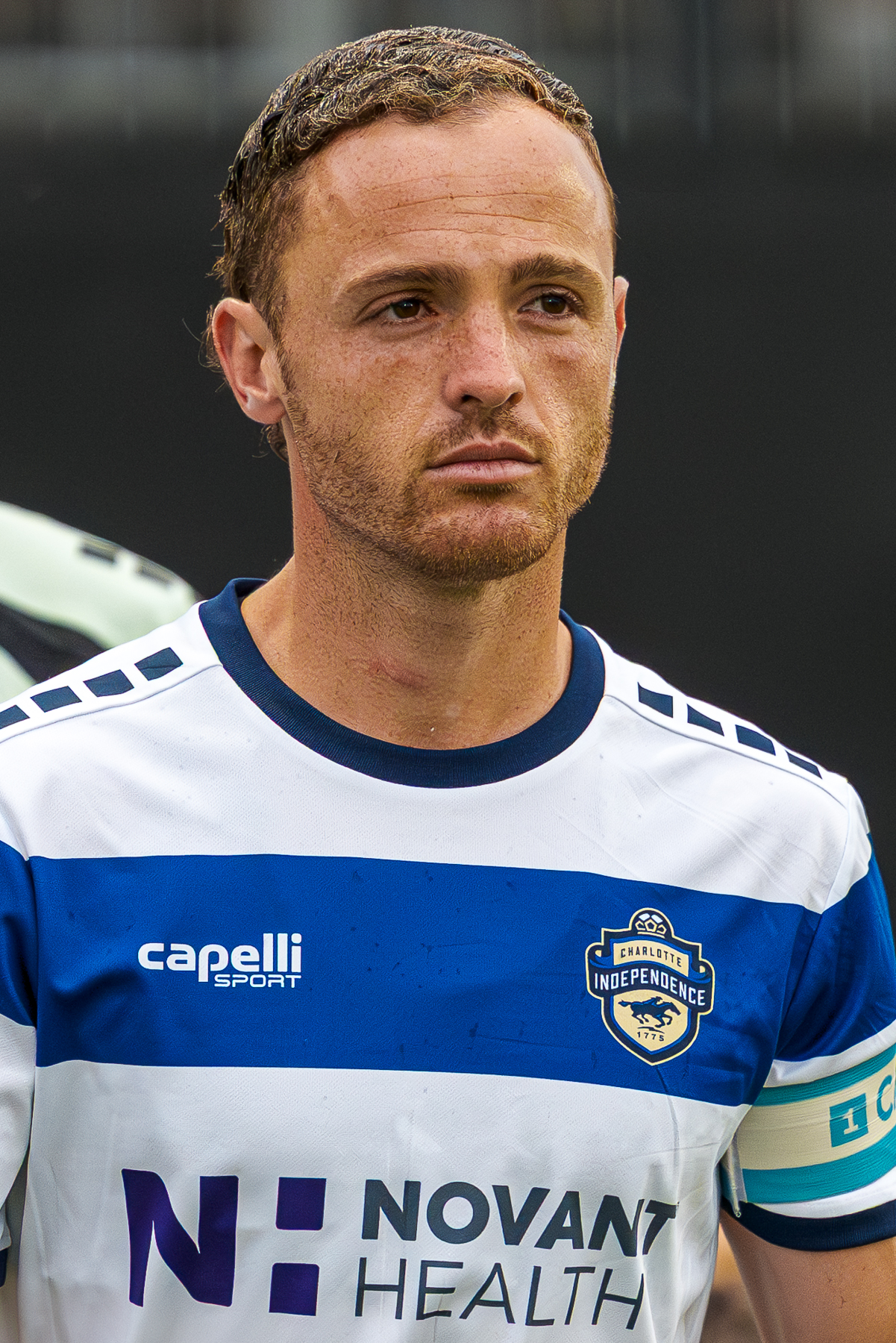
- Dimick with Charlotte Independence in 2026

Personal information
- Full name: Clay Everett Bryce Dimick
- Date of birth: December 7, 1994 (age 31)
- Place of birth: Atlanta, Georgia, United States
- Height: 1.75 m (5 ft 9 in)
- Positions: Midfielder; defender

Team information
- Current team: Charlotte Independence
- Number: 17

College career
Years	Team	Apps	(Gls)
2013–2016	Belmont Abbey Crusaders	46	(19)

Senior career*
Years	Team	Apps	(Gls)
2016	West Virginia Alliance	13	(0)
2017	GPS Portland Phoenix	11	(4)
2017	Westgate Sindjelic		
2017	Geelong	5	(0)
2018	Charlotte Eagles	14	(1)
2019–	Charlotte Independence	176	(5)
- * Club domestic league appearances and goals as of October 31, 2026

Clay Everett Bryce Dimick (born December 7, 1994) is an American professional soccer player who currently plays for Charlotte Independence in the USL League One.

== Career ==
Dimick played college soccer at Belmont Abbey College between 2013 and 2016.

While at college, Dimick appeared in the USL PDL for West Virginia Alliance and GPS Portland Phoenix.

Dimick moved to Australia to appear for both Westgate Sindjelic and Geelong in 2017.

2018 saw Dimick back in the United States with PDL side Charlotte Eagles.

After a three-month trial with Charlotte Independence, Dimick eventually signed with the USL Championship side on 20 June 2019. He made his professional debut on 7 September 2019, appearing as an 83rd-minute substitute in a 3–1 loss to Tampa Bay Rowdies.

Dimick extended his contract with Charlotte Independence on 2 March 2022. Dimick missed the 2023 season due to a major surgery that saw two ruptured discs replaced with artificial replacements. Dimick returned to soccer in 2024, playing every minute of the season for Charlotte. In December 2024, he was named USL League One's Comeback Player of the Year. In January 2025, Dimick re-signed with Independence for the upcoming season.
