= Mike Jeffries (soccer) =

American soccer player and coach

Personal information
- Full name: Michael Jeffries
- Date of birth: May 20, 1962 (age 64)
- Place of birth: Lynn, Massachusetts, United States
- Height: 5 ft 9 in (1.75 m)
- Position: Defender

Team information
- Current team: Charlotte Independence (head coach/GM)

College career
Years	Team	Apps	(Gls)
1980–1983	Duke Blue Devils		

Senior career*
Years	Team	Apps	(Gls)
1984	Minnesota Strikers	8	(1)
1984–1987	Minnesota Strikers (indoor)	127	(18)
1988	Dallas Sidekicks (indoor)	33	(7)
1993–1997	New Orleans Riverboat Gamblers		

International career
1984–1985	United States	3	(0)

Managerial career
- 1993–1994: New Orleans Riverboat Gamblers (assistant)
- 1995–1998: New Orleans Riverboat Gamblers
- 1998–2000: Chicago Fire (assistant)
- 2001–2003: Dallas Burn
- 2004: Southern Methodist University (assistant)
- 2005: University of the Incarnate Word
- 2006–2007: Duke University (assistant)
- 2008–2010: Chicago Fire (assistant)
- 2013–2014: Des Moines Menace
- 2015–2018: Charlotte Independence
- 2019–: Charlotte Independence
- * Club domestic league appearances and goals

Michael Jeffries (born May 20, 1962) is an American soccer coach and former player who is currently the head coach of Charlotte Independence in USL League One. The 1983 Hermann Trophy winner, he played professionally in the North American Soccer League and Major Indoor Soccer League, earning three caps with the U.S. national team.

== Playing career ==
=== College ===
Jeffries attended Duke University, where he played on the men's soccer team from 1980 to 1983. Jeffries was selected to represent the United States at the 1981 Maccabiah Games in Israel. In 1982, Duke went to the NCAA championship before falling to Indiana University in eight overtimes. In 1983, Jeffries was a first-team All-American and the 1983 Hermann Trophy winner as the outstanding collegiate player of the year. Jeffries was a double major at Duke, earning a bachelor's degree in electrical engineering and public policy. He later earned a master's degree from Tulane University.

=== Professional ===
After his graduation, Jeffries played one season with the 1984 Minnesota Strikers of the North American Soccer League (NASL), the final year of the league's existence. After the NASL folded, the Strikers moved to the Major Indoor Soccer League (MISL). Jeffries remained with the Strikers and played with indoor soccer with them from 1984 to 1987. The Strikers released Jeffries in the fall of 1987 and he signed as a free agent with the Dallas Sidekicks on October 20, 1987. He played thirty-three games of the 1987–1988 season before tearing his anterior cruciate ligament and retiring from playing professionally. In 1993, he became a player-assistant coach with the New Orleans Riverboat Gamblers of the USISL.

=== National team ===
Jeffries played his first game with the U.S. national team in a scoreless tie with Ecuador on November 30, 1984. He played again, this time in a 2–0 loss to Canada on April 2, 1985. His last game with the national team came two days later in a 1–1 tie with Canada.

== Post-playing career ==
After retiring, Jeffries became a financial consultant with Smith Barney in New Orleans. After three years, he decided to return to soccer and founded the Lafreniere Select Soccer Program.

== Coaching ==
In 1995, Jeffries was elevated from assistant to head coach of the New Orleans Riverboat Gamblers of the USISL. In his four seasons with the Gamblers, Jeffries compiled a 42–34 record.

In 1998, the expansion Chicago Fire of Major Soccer League hired Jeffries away from the Gamblers. He spent the next three seasons as an assistant coach to Bob Bradley, helping the team to the 1998 MLS championship and 1998 and 2000 Lamar Hunt U.S. Open Cup titles. The Dallas Burn announced the hiring of Jeffries as the team's new head coach on January 23, 2001. He lasted two seasons before being fired on September 15, 2003, having compiled a 23–36–16 record (4–16–4 record in 2003) with the Burn.

After being fired by the Burn, Jeffries remained in Dallas and served as a volunteer coach with Southern Methodist University (SMU) during the 2004 NCAA season. In 2005, Jeffries was named head coach at the University of the Incarnate Word in San Antonio, Texas. In his first and only season he led the Crusaders to the NCAA Division II National Tournament and a final ranking of 23rd in the nation. He was also named Heartland Conference Coach of the Year. In 2006, Jeffries came back to Duke as the men's soccer team Associate Head Coach. After Duke head coach John Rennie retired, he was not given the place as his successor at Duke and left his alma mater to return to the staff for the Fire as an assistant.

After leaving the Fire staff to serve as a scout for former boss Bob Bradley during the 2010 FIFA World Cup, Jeffries returned to the Fire as director of player personnel. In January 2013, Jeffries was introduced as head coach of the Des Moines Menace, a USL Premier Development League club.

Jeffries was hired as head coach for the USL Pro expansion club Charlotte Independence on December 5, 2014. Jeffries first stint as the Independence head coach lasted from December 5, 2014, to December 6, 2018. In 2018, Jeffries was promoted to general manager for the Independence, and coach Jim McGuiness was named head coach. Coach McGuiness's stint as head coach was short lived, as he only lasted 15 games, achieving 1 win, 8 losses, and 6 draws in that span. On June 12, 2019, Jeffries resumed his duties as head coach for the Charlotte Independence, while remaining as the team's general manager.

=== Family ===
Jeffries married Theresa Ann Tauer during his time with the Minnesota Strikers, and they had 3 children: Kaitlin, Anthony (A.J.), and Nathan.
