= Tresor Mbuyu =

Congolese footballer (born 1996)

Personal information
- Date of birth: 16 October 1996 (age 30)
- Place of birth: Kinshasa, DR Congo
- Height: 1.78 m (5 ft 10 in)
- Position: Forward

Team information
- Current team: Asheville City SC

College career
Years	Team	Apps	(Gls)
2015	Trinity Baptist Eagles	19	(23)
2016–2018	Liberty Flames	40	(33)

Senior career*
Years	Team	Apps	(Gls)
2016	Charlotte Eagles	10	(3)
2017	Tri-Cities Otters	8	(4)
2018	North Carolina U23	9	(4)
2019	Orlando City B	19	(1)
2020–2024	Charlotte Independence	99	(20)
2025	Charlotte Independence	7	(0)
2026–	Asheville City SC		
- * Club domestic league appearances and goals as of 13:09, 1 November 2025 (UTC)

Tresor Mbuyu (born 16 October 1996) is a Congolese footballer who plays as a forward for Asheville City SC in USL League Two.

== Career ==
Mbuyu signed with USL League One side Orlando City B in 2019.

Mbuyu joined USL Championship side Charlotte Independence in 2020. On February 16, 2022, Charlotte announced that Mbuyu had re-signed, staying with the team as they transitioned to USL League One. On May 11, 2022, Mbuyu was named USL League One player of the month for April. He returned to the team for the 2023 season. After leaving Charlotte at the end of the 2024 season, Mbuyu returned on a short-term contract in June 2025.

== Personal life ==
Mbuyu moved to the United States from the Democratic Republic of the Congo at the age of 13, settling in Charlotte and attending Garinger High School.
