= Charlotte Independence =

American professional soccer team in Charlotte, North Carolina

- Nickname: The Jacks
- Founded: September 17, 2014; 12 years ago
- Stadium: American Legion Memorial Stadium; Charlotte, North Carolina
- Capacity: 10,500
- Owner: Queen City Soccer Club, LLC
- President: Jim McPhilliamy
- Head coach: Mike Jeffries
- League: USL League One
- 2025: USL League One, 8th of 12; Playoffs: Quarter-finals
- Website: charlotteindependence.com
Home colors	Away colors

Charlotte Independence is an American soccer team based in Charlotte, North Carolina, that plays in the USL League One, the third tier of the American soccer pyramid.

The Independence currently play their home games at American Legion Memorial Stadium in the Elizabeth neighborhood of Charlotte, North Carolina. Previously, the Independence have played at Ramblewood Soccer Complex and Sportsplex at Matthews.

The team's colors are navy, blue, and parchment. The independence wear blue kits at home, and grey on the road.

== History ==
The Charlotte Independence were founded in 2014. They acquired the USL Pro franchise rights for Charlotte from the Charlotte Eagles, who moved into the amateur Premier Development League (PDL).

The Independence took their name from Mecklenburg Declaration of Independence. Their crest features the year 1775 (the year in which it was purported to have been signed) and a horse-mounted Captain James Jack, who is said to have carried the Declaration to Philadelphia. Supporters were asked to choose one of twelve designs; all 12 featured the year and Jack. The team is nicknamed "The Jacks," in Jack's honor.

Former Dallas Burn head coach Mike Jeffries was hired as the Independence head coach on December 5, 2014.

The Independence lost their first game to the Charleston Battery 3–2 on March 28, 2015, at Transamerica Field. Jack Thompson scored the team's first ever goal in the 13th minute.

After recording their best season in 2021, finishing second in the Atlantic Division, the club decided to drop down to the third tier USL League One for 2022, with the goal of better serving its youth players, as well as the fact that a new expansion franchise in the city Charlotte FC was joining Major League Soccer that season, with whom several Independence players had signed. The Independence signed an affiliation agreement with Charlotte FC for the 2022 season only on April 5. Charlotte FC will loan a minimum of three players. The Independence made the USL League One playoffs in the club's first season in the league in 2022. Charlotte finished with 42 points and one of the best attacks in the league with 48 goals, the third-highest in USL League One.

== Stadium ==
In 2016, the club began working with Mecklenburg County on a refurbishment of American Legion Memorial Stadium. The club subsequently signed a 10-year lease with the county for Memorial Stadium to become its new home, beginning in 2021. The Independence played the first match at the newly renovated stadium on Wednesday, July 7, 2021.

American Legion Memorial Stadium holds 10,500 people and is considered to be one of the best soccer-specific stadiums in the country. The stadium is located in the heart of the Elizabeth neighborhood in Charlotte with an updated concourse, a view of the Charlotte city skyline, and a World War I memorial at the entrance.

American Legion Memorial Stadium has hosted various different events throughout its history, including Presidential addresses, professional wrestling matches, professional and high school football, and Charlotte's first ever professional soccer team, the Carolina Lightnin', during the American Soccer League Championship in 1981 in front of 20,163 fans.

Previously, the Independence played matches in the greater Charlotte region at the Sportsplex in Matthews in Matthews, North Carolina, Ramblewood Soccer Complex, the University of North Carolina at Charlotte's Transamerica Field and Winthrop University's Eagle Field.

== Sponsorship ==
Seasons	Kit manufacturer	Shirt sponsor
2015–2016	Adidas	OrthoCarolina
2017–2023	Adidas	Novant Health
2023–present	Capelli Sport	Novant Health

== Record ==
=== Year-by-year ===
Season	League	Regular season								Playoffs	U.S. Open Cup	USL Cup	Top scorer		Average attendance
Season	League	Pld	W	D	L	GF	GA	Pts	Pos	Playoffs	U.S. Open Cup	USL Cup	Player	Goals	Average attendance
2015	USL	28	10	10	8	38	35	40	7th, Eastern	Did not qualify	Fifth Round	–	(United States) Ryan Finley	9	1,800
2016	USL	30	14	8	8	48	29	50	5th, Eastern	Conference Quarterfinals	Third Round	–	(Uruguay) Enzo Martinez	9	1,375
2017	USL	32	13	9	10	52	40	48	5th, Eastern	Conference Quarterfinals	Third Round	–	(Uruguay) Enzo Martinez	16	1,615
2018	USL	34	10	12	12	44	57	42	11th, Eastern	Did not qualify	Second Round	–	(Colombia) Jorge Herrera	13	1,659
2019	USLC	34	9	11	14	42	53	38	13th, Eastern	Did not qualify	Second Round	–	(Colombia) Jorge Herrera	7	1,750
2020	USLC	16	8	4	4	24	22	28	6th, Eastern; 1st, Group G	Conference Quarterfinals	Cancelled	–	(Jamaica) Dane Kelly	11	N/A
2021	USLC	32	18	5	9	57	36	59	4th, Eastern; 2nd, Atlantic Division	Conference Semifinals	Cancelled	–	(Jamaica) Dane Kelly (United States) Irvin Parra	11	2,009
2022	USL1	30	12	6	12	48	48	42	6th	Quarterfinals	Second Round	–	(Jamaica) Khori Bennett (Democratic Republic of the Congo) Tresor Mbuyu	11	2,322
2023	USL1	32	13	10	9	50	42	49	4th	Finals	Third Round	–	(Democratic Republic of the Congo) Tresor Mbuyu	9	1,601
2024	USL1	22	9	7	6	37	31	34	6th	Quarterfinals	Round of 32	Semifinals	(Honduras) Juan Carlos Obregon	15	1,077
2025	USL1	30	10	7	13	45	50	37	8th	Quarterfinals	Third Round	Group Stage	(United States) Christian Chaney	12	714
Total		320	126	89	105	485	443	467	–						1,530

1. Top Scorer includes all goals scored in regular season, league playoffs, U.S. Open Cup, and other competitive continental matches.

== Players and staff ==
=== Current roster ===
As of May 24, 2026

Note: Flags indicate national team as defined under FIFA eligibility rules; some limited exceptions apply. Players may hold more than one non-FIFA nationality.

No.	Pos.	Nation	Player
1	GK	CYP	George Tasouris
2	DF	CMR	Fabrice Ngah
3	DF	USA	Joey Skinner
4	DF	FRA	Séga Coulibaly
5	DF	MEX	Javen Romero
6	MF	CMR	Jeando Fuchs
7	FW	LBR	Prince Saydee
8	MF	USA	Christopher Jaime
9	FW	COD	Christy Manzinga
10	MF	ESP	Jon Bakero
11	MF	MEX	Viggo Ortiz
12	GK	USA	Josh Burton
13	MF	FRA	Mathis Guffroy
14	DF	MTQ	Reudd Manin

No.	Pos.	Nation	Player
16	DF	USA	Miles Lyons
17	DF	USA	Clay Dimick
19	MF	URU	Enzo Martínez
21	DF	USA	Thabo Nare
22	DF	COL	Kevin Riascos
23	FW	USA	Jonathan Nyandjo
24	MF	USA	Jefferson Amaya
26	FW	CMR	Souaibou Marou
28	GK	USA	Matt Levy
39	DF	USA	Jack Neeley (on loan from Charlotte FC)
44	MF	USA	Matthew Arango
45	DF	USA	Gavin Pierce
47	MF	HON	Luis Álvarez (on loan from Tampa Bay Rowdies)

=== Front office ===
- Jim McPhilliamy – CEO & Managing Partner
- Tim Schuldt – President & COO
- Mike Jeffries – General Manager
- Isaiah (Tito) Villanueva – Director of Operations
- Alex Kantor – Executive Director of Corporate Partnerships
- Ashley Osiecki – Vice President of Marketing and Communications
- Ulises Vega – Creative Director
- Drew Hubbard – Senior manager of Marketing and Broadcasting
- Eric Brown – Team Operations Manager and Director of Game Day Operations
- Edwin Valentin – The Boss Man
- Paulo Nogueira – Inaugural Account Executive
- Jake Kling – Northwest Chicago Native

=== Coaching staff ===
- Mike Jeffries – Head Coach
- Bradley Johnson – Assistant Coach
- Jay Lockheart – Assistant Coach
- Lindsay Jones – Athletic Trainer

=== Head coaches ===
- Includes USL Regular Season, USL Playoffs, U.S. Open Cup. Excludes friendlies.

Coach	Nationality	Start	End	Games	Win	Loss	Draw	Win %
Mike Jeffries	United States	December 5, 2014	December 6, 2018	135	52	44	39	38.52
Jim McGuinness	Ireland	December 7, 2018	June 12, 2019	15	1	8	6	6.67
Mike Jeffries	United States	June 12, 2019	present	19	8	6	5	42.11

Mike Jeffries has been the Independence's head coach for all but 15 games of the team's existence. His first stint was from 2014 to 2018 as head coach. Coach Jeffries was promoted to general manager in 2018. In 2019, he resumed his duties as head coach while remaining the general manager.

== Club culture ==
A self-described independent, grassroots supporters group, "The Mecklenburg Reserves," was formed in July 2021. The Mecklenburg Reserves occupy section 114 alongside the Independence Ultras. The Ultras and Reserves help create the supporters section atmosphere with Blue Furia, an independent predominantly Hispanic supporters group, and La Femme Footie, a group that works to promote women's soccer and women's involvement in the sport.

The Independence competed for the Southern Derby against their rival, the Charleston Battery while Charlotte was in USL Championship. The derby took place over each team's final home game, and is decided on a points system. If the two games end in a tie, it is then awarded to the team who leads in aggregate goals. The independence won their first Southern Derby in 2021.

The club's original independent supporters' group, "Jack's Militia", was founded in 2012 to promote soccer in Charlotte. When the Charlotte Independence were announced, Jack's Militia became the new team's official supporters group.

The team's games are broadcast on ESPN+.

== Achievements ==
- USL League One
  - Championships: 2026
  - Runner Up: 2023
  - Quarterfinals: 2022
  - Players' Shield: 2026
- USL Championship
  - Conference Quarterfinals: 2016, 2017, 2020
- Southern Derby
  - Winner: 2021

== Affiliations ==
In April 2019, Carolina Rapids Soccer Club, Discoveries Soccer Club, and Lake Norman Soccer Club merged to create the Charlotte Independence Soccer Club, making it one of the largest youth soccer clubs in the country. The club provides programs for Youth and Adult Recreation, TopSoccer, Boys and Girls Competitive, Boys and Girls ECNL, Boys U.S. Soccer Development Academy, USL2 and WPSL, for its 12,000 members. The youth affiliation with the pro club designates itself as one of the few youth soccer clubs in the area, region and nation to offer a direct pro pathway for its players. CISC operates as 4 Regional locations throughout the Carolinas, North, South, East and West. Serving North Carolina communities such as Belmont, Cabarrus, Cornelius, Davidson, Denver, Gastonia, Huntersville, Matthews, Mooresville, North Meck, South Charlotte, Statesville, and Steele Creek, as well as Fort Mill, Rock Hill and York County in South Carolina.
