= 2022 Chattanooga Red Wolves SC season =

Chattanooga Red Wolves SC
2022 season
- Owner: Robert Martino
- Head coach: Jimmy Obleda
- Stadium: CHI Memorial Stadium
- Top goalscorer: 5 players (2 goals)
- Highest home attendance: 2,654 (4/23 v. TUC)
- Lowest home attendance: 1,807 (5/7 v. NCO)
- Average home league attendance: 2,266
- Biggest win: CHA 7–1 CLT (6/22)
- Biggest defeat: RIC 3–0 CHA (6/1)

The 2022 Chattanooga Red Wolves SC season was the fourth season in the soccer team's history, all of which they've competed in USL League One, a league in the third division of American soccer. They played their home games at CHI Memorial Stadium in East Ridge, Tennessee. This was their third season playing for manager Jimmy Obleda. Chattanooga Red Wolves were coming off of a 3rd-place finish from last season, the most successful season in the club's history at the time.

== Club ==
=== Roster ===
As of March 31, 2022

No.	Pos.	Nation	Player
1	GK	USA	Tim Murray
2	DF	VEN	Jorge Luna
3	DF	USA	Jonny Guadarrama
4	DF	PUR	Nicolás Cardona
5	DF	USA	Daniel Navarro
6	MF	USA	Jimmie Villalobos
7	FW	BRA	Rafael Mentzingen
8	MF	BRA	Ualefi
9	FW	URU	David Texeira
10	MF	MEX	José Carrera
11	MF	USA	Josue España
12	GK	MEX	Carlos Avilez
13	FW	USA	Rey Ortiz
14	MF	USA	Pedro Hernández
17	MF	USA	Josue Cartagena
18	DF	USA	DJ Benton
19	FW	COL	Juan Galindrez
20	MF	VEN	Jorge Páez
21	MF	VEN	Andrés Hernández
22	DF	ARG	Aaron Lombardi
23	DF	CHI	Sebastian Capozucchi
25	GK	USA	Tor Saunders (on loan from Indy Eleven)
41	MF	USA	Brian Bement
99	MF	USA	Moe Espinoza

USL Academy Contract

== Competitions ==
=== Exhibitions ===
February 26, 2022 Preseason	Memphis 901 FC	0–1	Chattanooga Red Wolves	Memphis, Tennessee
4:00 PM EST		Report	79'	Stadium: Mike Rose Soccer Complex

March 2, 2022 Preseason	Atlanta United 2	0–1	Chattanooga Red Wolves	Marietta, Georgia
7:00 PM EST		Report	37'	Stadium: Children's Healthcare of Atlanta Training Ground

March 12, 2022 Preseason	Chattanooga Red Wolves	v	University of Kentucky	East Ridge, Tennessee
1:00 PM EST				Stadium: CHI Memorial Stadium
Note: Cancelled due to inclement weather

March 19, 2022 Preseason	Columbus Crew 2	2–1	Chattanooga Red Wolves	Columbus, Ohio
1:30 PM EST	77'		Villalobos 16'	Stadium: OhioHealth Performance Center

=== USL League One ===
==== Standings ====
Pos	Team	Pld	W	L	T	GF	GA	GD	Pts	Qualification
2	Greenville Triumph SC	30	12	8	10	40	38	+2	46	Qualification for the semi-finals
3	Tormenta FC (C)	30	12	9	9	42	40	+2	45	Qualification for the play-offs
4	Chattanooga Red Wolves SC	30	12	11	7	52	39	+13	43	Qualification for the play-offs
5	Union Omaha	30	10	7	13	34	33	+1	43	Qualification for the play-offs
6	Charlotte Independence	30	12	12	6	48	48	0	42	Qualification for the play-offs

Source: USL League One
Rules for classification: 1) points; 2) total wins; 3) total goal differential; 4) total goals scored; 5) points earned against top four Conference finishers; 6) disciplinary points; 7) drawing of lots.
(C) Champions

==== Match results ====
April 2, 2022 1	Chattanooga Red Wolves	1–1	Forward Madison	East Ridge, Tennessee
7:30 PM EDT	Benton (yellow card) 19'; Villalobos 40'; Bement (yellow card) 74'; P. Hernandez (yellow card) 90'	Report	Murillo (yellow card) 47'; Gebhard (yellow card) 68'; Wheeler-Omiunu (yellow card) 76'; Bartman 90+5'	Stadium: CHI Memorial Stadium; Attendance: 2,618; Referee: Benjamin Meyer

April 9, 2022 2	North Carolina FC	1–3	Chattanooga Red Wolves	Cary, North Carolina
7:00 PM EDT	Skelton (yellow card) 16'; McLaughlin 19'; Servania (yellow card) 36'; Blanco (yellow card) 85'	Report	Luna (yellow card) 38'; Ortiz 60'; España (yellow card) 64', (goal) 67'; Lombardi 70'; A. Hernández (yellow card) 74'; Cardona (yellow card) 88'	Stadium: Sahlen's Stadium at WakeMed Soccer Park; Attendance: 2,006; Referee: John Griggs

April 16, 2022 3	Chattanooga Red Wolves	1–0	Richmond Kickers	East Ridge, Tennessee
7:00 PM EDT	Capozucchi (yellow card) 26'; Espinoza 50', (yellow card) 75'; Avilez (yellow card) 83'; A. Hernández (yellow card) 90+6'	Report	Morán (yellow card) 84'; Aune (yellow card) 90+1'; Terzaghi (yellow card) 90+5'	Stadium: CHI Memorial Stadium; Attendance: 2,236; Referee: Joshua Belk

April 23, 2022 4	Chattanooga Red Wolves	2–3	FC Tucson	East Ridge, Tennessee
7:30 PM EDT	Villalobos 26'; Mentzingen 62'; Luna (yellow card) 90'	Report	Fahling (yellow card) 19'; Mastrantonio 55'; Perez 71'; Sunday (yellow card) 84'; Bedoya 90+1' (pen.)	Stadium: CHI Memorial Stadium; Attendance: 2,654; Referee: Kyle Johnston

April 29, 2022 5	Greenville Triumph	1–0	Chattanooga Red Wolves	Greenville, South Carolina
7:00 PM EDT	Shultz (yellow card) 45+1'; Smart (yellow card) 60'; Walker 80' (pen.)	Report	Capozucchi (yellow card) 13'; Espinoza (yellow card) 64'	Stadium: Legacy Early College Field; Referee: Izlen Peksenar

May 7, 2022 6	Chattanooga Red Wolves	4–1	Hailstorm FC	East Ridge, Tennessee
7:30 PM EDT	Luna (yellow card) 10'; Texeira 26', 51', (yellow card) 55'; Benton 45'; Carrera-García 60'; Villalobos (yellow card) 62'; Cardona (yellow card) 77'; España (yellow card) 85'; Capozucchi (yellow card) 86'; Ortiz (yellow card) 90+4'	Report	Lukic 8'; Norman (yellow card) 22'; Rogers (yellow card) 59'; Parra (yellow card) 79'	Stadium: CHI Memorial Stadium; Attendance: 1,807; Referee: Aleksandar Zhelyazkov

May 14, 2022 7	Chattanooga Red Wolves	2–2	Fuego FC	East Ridge, Tennessee
7:30 PM EDT	Mentzingen 3'; Galindrez 45+5' (pen.); Lombardi (yellow card) 50'; Luna (yellow card) 56'; Cardona (yellow card) 89'; Carrera-García (red card) 90'	Report	Casillas 15'; Falck 45+3'; Schenfeld (yellow card) 90+7'	Stadium: CHI Memorial Stadium; Attendance: 2,104; Referee: Kyle Johnston

May 28, 2022 8	Chattanooga Red Wolves	0–1	Greenville Triumph	East Ridge, Tennessee
7:30 PM EDT	Cardona (yellow card) 18'; Benton (yellow card) 38'	Report	Polak (yellow card) 35'; Labovitz 75'	Stadium: CHI Memorial Stadium; Attendance: 2,576; Referee: Benjamin Meyer

June 1, 2022 9	Richmond Kickers	3–0	Chattanooga Red Wolves	Richmond, Virginia
6:30 PM EDT	Candela (yellow card) 17'; Aune 35'; Crisler 38'; Baima 45+2', (yellow card) 80'; Morán (yellow card) 58'	Report	Bement (yellow card) 8'; Benton (yellow card) 31'; Cardona (yellow card) 77'	Stadium: City Stadium; Attendance: 2,011; Referee: John Matto

June 4, 2022 10	Chattanooga Red Wolves	0–1	Union Omaha	East Ridge, Tennessee
7:30 PM EDT	Ortiz (yellow card) 17'; Lombardi (yellow card) 22'; Carrera (yellow card) 90+4'	Report	Brito 2', (yellow card) 64'; Malcolm (yellow card) 45'; Jiba (yellow card) 49'; Nuhu (yellow card) 66'; Alihodžić (yellow card) 70'; Touche (yellow card) 87'	Stadium: CHI Memorial Stadium; Attendance: 2,235; Referee: Joshua Belk

June 11, 2022 11	Fuego FC	0–2	Chattanooga Red Wolves	Fresno, California
10:30 PM EDT	Dieye (yellow card) 13'; Gillingham (yellow card) 40'; Schenfeld (yellow card) 45'; Diaz (yellow card) 69'; Antman (yellow card) 78'	Report	Mentzingen (yellow card) 45+2'; Mehl (yellow card) 70'; Espinoza 81'; Galindrez 90+5', (yellow card) 90+5'	Stadium: Fresno State Soccer Stadium; Referee: Laura Rodriguez

June 22, 2022 12	Chattanooga Red Wolves	7–1	Charlotte Independence	East Ridge, Tennessee
7:30 PM EDT	Ortiz 23'; Galindrez 29' 38' (pen.) 66' (yellow card) 79'; Carrera (yellow card) 35'; Mentzingen 54'; Páez 73'; P. Hernandez 84'; Avilez (yellow card) 87'	Report	Mbuyu (yellow card) 13'; Acosta 20'; Barber (yellow card) 60'; Barone (penalty missed) 88'; Shevtsov (yellow card) 90+1'	Stadium: CHI Memorial Stadium; Attendance: 2,008; Referee: Wes Caouette

June 25, 2022 13	Chattanooga Red Wolves	1–2	FC Tucson	East Ridge, Tennessee
7:30 PM EDT	España (yellow card) 57'; Mentzingen (yellow card) 81'; Galindrez 90'	Report	L. Perez 45+2'; Allen (yellow card) 56'; Fahling (yellow card) 67'; Garcia 75'; Shaw (yellow card) 87'	Stadium: CHI Memorial Stadium; Attendance: 2,213; Referee: DeShun Beard

June 30, 2022 14	Hailstorm FC	2–1	Chattanooga Red Wolves	Windsor, Colorado
9:00 PM EDT	Robles 20'; Parra (yellow card) 25'; Evans 34'; Amann (yellow card) 44'	Report	Benton (yellow card) 19'; España (yellow card) 27'; Galindrez 61'; Capozucchi (yellow card) 63'; Ortiz (yellow card) 90'	Stadium: Future Legends Complex; Referee: Samantha Martinez

July 9, 2022 15	Tormenta FC	2–1	Chattanooga Red Wolves	Statesboro, Georgia
7:30 PM EDT	Roberts (yellow card) 31', (goal) 37'; Cabral (yellow card) 34', (goal) 81'; Nembhard (yellow card) 46'	Report	Carrera (yellow card) 33', (goal) 45'; Cardona (yellow card) 53'; Avilez (yellow card) 76'; España (yellow card) 89'; Lombardi (yellow card) 90+2'	Stadium: Optim Health Systems Park; Attendance: 731; Referee: Amin Hadzic

July 16, 2022 16	Chattanooga Red Wolves	2–1	North Carolina FC	East Ridge, Tennessee
7:30 PM EDT	Galindrez 13' (pen.); Cardona (yellow card) 17'; Navarro (yellow card) 40'; Mentzingen 42'; A. Hernández (yellow card) 88'; Avilez (yellow card) 90+5'	Report	Skelton (yellow card) 1'; Blanco (yellow card) 30'; Fernandes (yellow card) 33'; Martinez (yellow card) 47'; Arriaga 68'; Tahir (yellow card) 90+2'	Stadium: CHI Memorial Stadium; Attendance: 2,351; Referee: Alejo Calume

July 23, 2022 17	Chattanooga Red Wolves	0–0	Hailstorm FC	East Ridge, Tennessee
7:30 PM EDT	Benton (yellow card) 30'; Cardona (yellow card) 82'; Ortiz (yellow card) 89'	Report	McLean (yellow card) 59'; Desdunes (yellow card) 80'; Hernández (yellow card) 90+5'	Stadium: CHI Memorial Stadium; Attendance: 2,456; Referee: John Matto

July 30, 2022 18	Union Omaha	1–1	Chattanooga Red Wolves	Papillion, Nebraska
8:00 PM EDT	Willis 90+3'	Report	Hernández 20', (yellow card) 50' (yellow-red card) 66'; Lombardi (yellow card) 67'	Stadium: Werner Park; Attendance: 5,167; Referee: Cristian Campo Hernández

August 3, 2022 19	Fuego FC	0–1	Chattanooga Red Wolves	Fresno, California
10:30 PM EDT	Casillas (yellow card) 29' (yellow-red card) 45+3'; Bijev (yellow card) 39'; Antman (yellow card) 74'; Dieye (yellow card) 77'; Partida (yellow card) 90+2'; Chaney (penalty missed) 90+6'	Report	Cartagena (yellow card) 20'; Carrera-García (yellow card) 49'; A. Hernández 74'; Saunders (yellow card) 85'	Stadium: Fresno State Soccer Stadium; Attendance: 1,143; Referee: Killian Richardson

August 6, 2022 20	Chattanooga Red Wolves	5–1	Greenville Triumph	East Ridge, Tennessee
7:30 PM EDT	Cartagena 3'; Villalobos 7'; Mehl (yellow card) 43'; Benton (yellow card) 45'; Espinoza 70'; Mentzingen 85', 89', (yellow card) 90'	Report	Navarro 17' (o.g.); Labovitz (yellow card) 90'	Stadium: CHI Memorial Stadium; Attendance: 1,932; Referee: Joshua Belk

August 13, 2022 21	Forward Madison	1–1	Chattanooga Red Wolves	Madison, Wisconsin
8:00 PM EDT	Jones (yellow card) 48', (goal) 90+5'; Leonard (yellow card) 54'; Thiam (yellow card) 59'	Report	Benton (yellow card) 16'; Galindrez 17'; Ortiz (yellow card) 62'	Stadium: Breese Stevens Field; Attendance: 4,196; Referee: Chris Ruska

August 20, 2022 22	Chattanooga Red Wolves	2–1	Tormenta FC	East Ridge, Tennessee
7:30 PM EDT	Mehl (yellow card) 38'; Navarro (yellow card) 45'; Galindrez 45+4', (penalty missed) 54'; Espinoza (yellow card) 64'; Ualefi (yellow card) 72'; Villalobos 80'; Ortiz (yellow card) 90+4'	Report	Adjei 8', (yellow card) 21'; Adeniyi (yellow card) 40'; Dengler (yellow card) 48'; Bush (yellow card) 52'; Green (yellow card) 90+4'	Stadium: CHI Memorial Stadium; Referee: Shawn Tehini

August 27, 2022 23	Charlotte Independence	2–2	Chattanooga Red Wolves	Charlotte, North Carolina
7:00 PM EDT	Mbuyu (yellow card) 19', (goal) 90'; Acosta (yellow card) 28'; Ibarra 39'	Report	Tejera 2'; Espinoza (yellow card) 30', (goal) 61'; Carrera-García (penalty missed) 65'; Ortiz (yellow card) 90+5'	Stadium: American Legion Memorial Stadium; Attendance: 930; Referee: Katherine McCormick

September 3, 2022 24	Union Omaha	2–1	Chattanooga Red Wolves	Papillion, Nebraska
8:00 PM EDT	Brito (yellow card) 35'; Hertzog (red card) 60'; Gil 88'; Acoff 90+1'	Report	Espinoza 28'; Villalobos (yellow card) 64'; Tejera (yellow card) 89'	Stadium: Werner Park; Attendance: 2,745; Referee: Joshua Encarnación

September 10, 2022 25	Forward Madison	2–5	Chattanooga Red Wolves	Madison, Wisconsin
8:00 PM EDT	Temguia 38', (yellow card) 75'; Bartman (yellow card) 56'; Maldonado 62'; Conner (yellow card) 87'	Report	Cardona 13'; Lombardi (yellow card) 18'; Navarro 23', (yellow card) 25'; Ortiz 30'; Tejera 36'; Kraft (yellow card) 70'; Villalobos (yellow card) 86'; Galindrez 88'	Stadium: Breese Stevens Field; Attendance: 3,957; Referee: Kevin Fikar

September 17, 2022 26	Chattanooga Red Wolves	2–2	Richmond Kickers	East Ridge, Tennessee
7:30 PM EDT	Tejera (yellow card) 35'; Lombardi (yellow card) 49' (yellow-red card) 74'; Navarro (yellow card) 68'; Espinoza 69'; Mehl 78', (yellow card) 84'; Galindrez (yellow card) 90+3'	Report	Bolanos (yellow card) 31'; Ritchie (yellow card) 37'; Terzaghi (penalty scored) 43'; Gordon 51'	Stadium: CHI Memorial Stadium; Referee: Alyssa Nichols

September 24, 2022 27	FC Tucson	2–1	Chattanooga Red Wolves	Tucson, Arizona
10:00 PM EDT	Bedoya (penalty scored) 30'; Mastrantonio (yellow card) 34'; Fox 48'	Report	Mentzingen (yellow card) 16'; Espinoza (penalty scored) 35'; Villalobos (yellow card) 52'; Benton (yellow card) 60' (red card) 67'; Gutiérrez (yellow card) 81'; Ortiz (yellow card) 84'; Cardona (yellow card) 90+4'	Stadium: Kino Sports Complex; Attendance: 1,316; Referee: Brandon Stevis

October 1, 2022 28	Chattanooga Red Wolves	3–1	Charlotte Independence	East Ridge, Tennessee
7:30 PM EDT	Espinoza 10'; Mehl 48'; Cardona (yellow card) 54'; Carrera-García (yellow card) 62'; Galindrez 69'	Report	Conteh (yellow card) 3'; Mbuyu 28'; Ciss (yellow card) 64'; Dutey (yellow card) 76'; Shevtsov (yellow card) 82'; Hegardt (penalty missed) 88'	Stadium: CHI Memorial Stadium; Referee: A. Ndiaye

October 8, 2022 29	North Carolina FC	0–1	Chattanooga Red Wolves	Cary, North Carolina
7:00 PM EDT	Skelton (yellow card) 25'; Blanco (yellow card) 32' (yellow-red card) 75'; Rincon (yellow card) 33'; Martinez (yellow card) 43'; Pecka (yellow card) 57'; Molina (yellow card) 78'; Pulisic (yellow card) 79'	Report	España (yellow card) 28'; Galindrez 49'; Páez (yellow card) 90+2'; Carrera (yellow card) 90+3'	Stadium: Sahlen's Stadium at WakeMed Soccer Park; Referee: Matthew Franz

October 15, 2022 30	Tormenta FC	2–0	Chattanooga Red Wolves	Statesboro, Georgia
7:30 PM EDT	Adjei 5'; Sierakowski 24'	Report	Cardona (yellow card) 43'	Stadium: Optim Health Systems Field; Referee: Joshua Encarnación

==== USL League One playoffs ====
October 22, 2022 Quarter Finals	Chattanooga Red Wolves	1–0 (a.e.t.)	Union Omaha	East Ridge, Tennessee
7:30 PM EDT	Texeira (yellow card) 49'; Ortiz (yellow card) 57'; Benton (yellow card) 93'; Mentzingen 101'; Gutiérrez (yellow card) 120+4'	Report	Gil (yellow card) 10'; Scearce (yellow card) 78'; Claudio (yellow card) 113'	Stadium: CHI Memorial Stadium; Attendance: 2,416; Referee: Matthew Corrigan

October 29, 2022 Semi Finals	Richmond Kickers	0–1	Chattanooga Red Wolves	Richmond, Virginia
6:00 PM EDT	Fitch (yellow card) 33'; Crisler (yellow card) 36'; Morán (yellow card) 38'	Report	Villalobos (yellow card) 17'; Mehl (yellow card) 22'; Texeira (red card) 39'; Mentzingen 86', (yellow card) 87'	Stadium: City Stadium; Attendance: 5,526; Referee: Brad Jensen

November 6, 2022 Final	Tormenta FC	2–1	Chattanooga Red Wolves SC	Statesboro, Georgia
7:30 PM EST	Sterling 35' (pen.); Adjei (yellow card) 39'; Thorn (yellow card) 45+1'; Otieno (yellow card) 72'; Roberts 82'	Report	España (yellow card) 13'; Espinoza (yellow card) 33'; Ortiz (yellow card) 34'; Tejera 45+3'; Benton (yellow card) 72'; Carrera (yellow card) 85'	Stadium: Optim Sports Medicine Field; Attendance: 3,045; Referee: Elvis Osmanovic

=== U.S. Open Cup ===
April 6, 2022 2nd Round	Louisville City FC (Kentucky)	1–0	(Tennessee) Chattanooga Red Wolves	Louisville, Kentucky
7:30 PM EDT	DelPiccolo (yellow card) 23'; Harris 75', (yellow card) 87'	Report	Bement (yellow card) 43'; P. Hernandez (yellow card) 59'; Luna (yellow card) 77'	Stadium: Lynn Family Stadium; Referee: Nabil Bensalah
