= Rafael Mentzingen =

Brazilian footballer (born 1996)

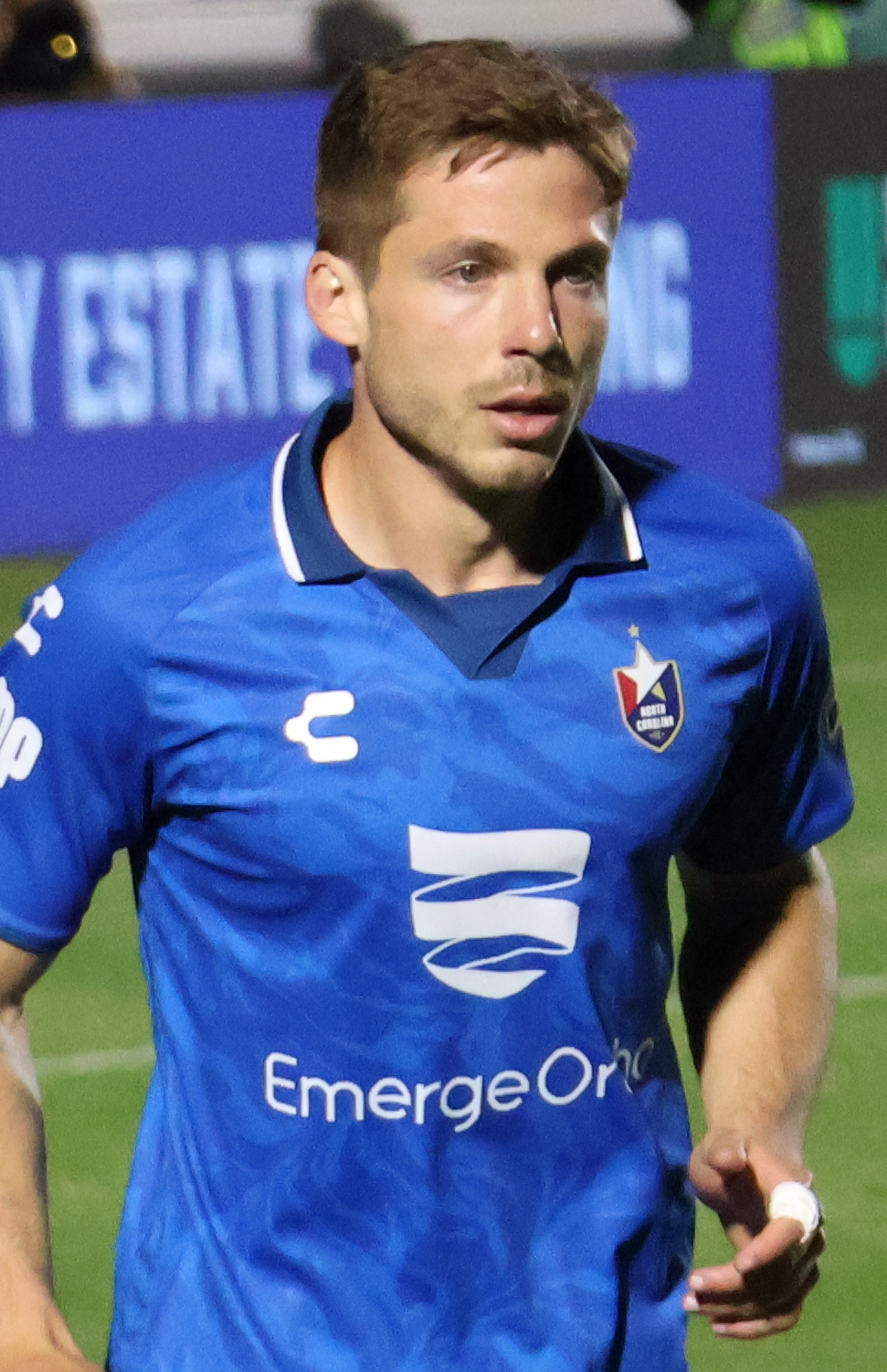
- Mentzingen with North Carolina FC in 2025

Personal information
- Full name: Rafael Duizit Mentzingen
- Date of birth: 2 May 1996 (age 30)
- Place of birth: Rio de Janeiro, Brazil
- Height: 1.75 m (5 ft 9 in)
- Positions: Midfielder; forward

Team information
- Current team: Detroit City
- Number: 17

Youth career
- 2007–2011: Volta Redonda
- 2011–2014: Resende
- 2014–2015: Vasco da Gama

College career
Years	Team	Apps	(Gls)
2015–2016	Bryan Lions	35	(22)
2017–2018	Valparaiso Crusaders	34	(11)

Senior career*
Years	Team	Apps	(Gls)
2016	Southern West Virginia King's Warriors	0	(0)
2017	Lansing United	9	(9)
2018	Detroit City	6	(3)
2019	Lansing Ignite	21	(6)
2020	Memphis 901	13	(3)
2021–2022	Chattanooga Red Wolves	45	(7)
2023–2025	North Carolina FC	80	(21)
2026–	Detroit City	9	(1)
- * Club domestic league appearances and goals as of October 31, 2026

Rafael Duizit Mentzingen (born 2 May 1996) is a Brazilian professional footballer who plays as a midfielder or forward. Detroit City FC in the USL Championship. He previously appeared at the semi-professional level for Southern West Virginia King's Warriors, Lansing United, and Detroit City and as a professional with Lansing Ignite, Memphis 901, and Chattanooga Red Wolves.

Born in Rio de Janeiro, Mentzingen came to the United States to play collegiate soccer at Bryan College. He spent two years with the Lions before transferring and playing his final two years of eligibility at Valparaiso. Mentzingen was selected in the fourth round of the 2019 MLS SuperDraft, but instead signed for USL League One club Lansing Ignite, with who he made his professional debut in 2019. The club folded after just one year of existence, with Mentzingen moving on to join Memphis 901 for the 2020 season.

== Early life ==
Born in Rio de Janeiro, Brazil, Mentzingen grew up in the municipality of Resende. He began playing futsal at the age of four, switching to football when he was 11. He began his career in the youth teams of Volta Redonda, later representing Resende and Vasco da Gama as a teenager. Mentzingen came to the United States at the age of 19 through an agency that matched colleges to foreign footballers. At the time, he spoke only Portuguese, but learned English within three months of his arrival in America.

== College and amateur ==
Mentzingen came to the United States in 2015 to play college soccer, joining the team at NAIA school Bryan College. He made his collegiate debut on 26 August, scoring in a 9–0 victory over Hiwassee. After scoring four goals in a two-match stretch in mid-October, Mentzingen was named as the Appalachian Athletic Conference Offensive Player of the Week. He finished the season with 11 goals in 17 appearances, was named as the AAC Freshman of the Year, and was placed on the All-AAC First Team. He continued to star as a sophomore, tallying three goals in the first two games of the 2016 season – the second of which was a bicycle kick in a 3–0 victory over Cumberlands. He earned his second career AAC Offensive Player of the Week nod at the end of October, capping a week where he scored four goals in two games against Montreat and Tennessee Wesleyan. Mentzingen finished the season with 11 goals in 18 appearances; he earned a second-consecutive All-AAC First Team nod, was on the AAC All-Tournament Team, and was named as an NAIA Second-Team All-American. He transferred to Valparaiso following the season, finishing his two years at Bryan with 22 goals in 35 appearances.

Mentzingen made his Valparaiso and NCAA Division I debut on 25 August 2017 as the Crusaders fell 2–1 against Northwestern. He scored his first Crusader goal a week later, helping Valpo defeat nationally ranked Loyola in the program's Missouri Valley Conference (MVC) debut. Mentzingen earned national recognition for a goal he scored in the 2017 Missouri Valley Conference Men's Soccer Tournament, although his "mesmerizing goal" came in a 4–2 defeat to Drake. He was named to the All-Missouri Valley First Team after tallying nine goals in 18 appearances on the season. As a senior, Mentzingen's scoring output fell off for the first time in his collegiate career: he tallied just two goals in 16 matches. Those goals came in a three-match span midway through the season, including his final collegiate goal in a 4–1 defeat to Oral Roberts on 1 October. He finished his Crusader career with 11 goals in 34 appearances and earned a second consecutive nod to the All-MVC First Team.

=== Southern West Virginia King's Warriors ===
Following his freshman season at Bryan, Mentzingen was on the roster for Premier Development League club Southern West Virginia King's Warriors. He did not make an appearance during the final season of existence for the club.

=== Lansing United ===
For the summer of 2017, Mentzingen moved to the National Premier Soccer League and signed for Lansing United. He debuted for the club on 14 May, playing 74 minutes and scoring a goal in a 2–0 victory over Milwaukee Torrent. Mentzingen continued his goal-scoring form through the first half of the season, tallying two goals against F.C. Indiana on 19 May and again versus AFC Ann Arbor on 26 May. After scoring a brace in a 4–2 win over Grand Rapids FC on 10 June, he was named as the NPSL national player of the week. His season was ended in late June due to injury, but Mentzingen finished the year with nine goals in nine matches and was honored as the Lansing United player of the year.

=== Detroit City ===
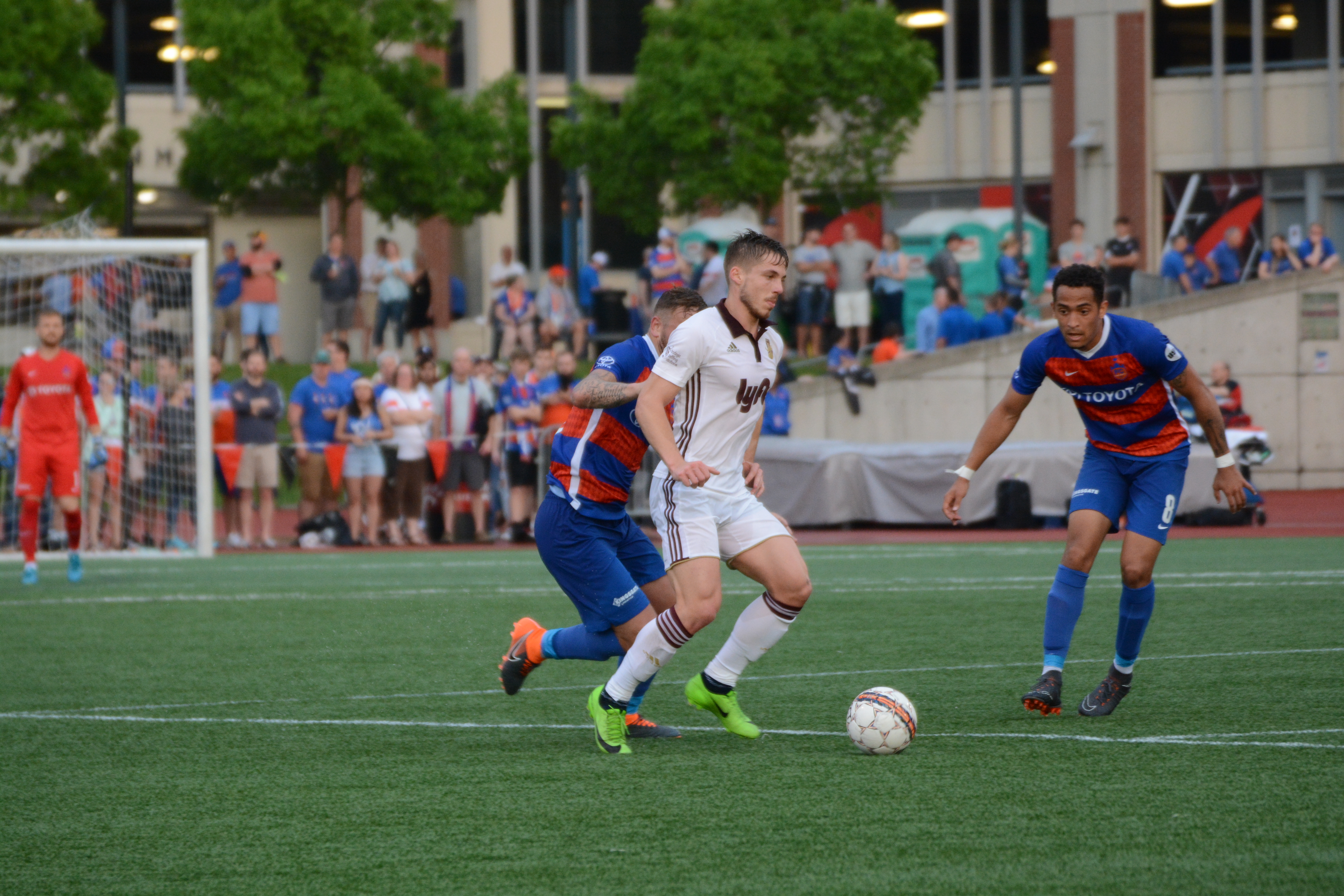
Mentzingen scored 12 goals in 17 appearances across three seasons with semi-professional clubs.

Mentzingen moved across the state of Michigan in 2018, joining fellow National Premier Soccer League club Detroit City for the summer season. After appearing for the club in preseason, he made his competitive debut for Le Rouge in the first round of the 2018 U.S. Open Cup, starting and playing 113 minutes as Detroit knocked out Michigan Bucks on penalties. Mentzingen scored his first goals for the club on 27 May, bagging two goals and providing an assist after entering as a second-half substitute in an 11–0 victory over F.C. Indiana. He added another goal five days later, this time helping Detroit defeat F.C. Indiana by a scoreline of 8–0. Mentzingen played sporadically throughout the remainder of the season, finishing with three goals in eight total appearances.

== Club career ==
Although he had already signed a contract with Lansing Ignite, Mentzingen was drafted 90th overall in the 2019 MLS SuperDraft by Columbus Crew SC, who retained his Major League Soccer rights through the end of the 2020 season. He had previously trained with the club in 2018, but he and the Crew determined that he "needed more experience at the professional level" before joining Columbus. The sides agreed that Mentzingen would sign with Lansing for the 2019 USL League One season and join the Crew for preseason in 2020 to battle for a roster spot.

=== Lansing Ignite ===
On 14 December 2018, Mentzingen signed for USL League One expansion club Lansing Ignite. He became the third signing in club history, inking a one-year contract. Mentzingen made his club and professional debut on 30 March 2019, entering as a second-half substitute against Richmond Kickers. His first professional goal came less than two months later, on 18 May in a home fixture against North Texas SC. The 54th-minute strike helped the Ignite earn a 2–2 draw against the eventual league champions. In July, Mentzingen was named as the League One Player of the Month as the Ignite went unbeaten in six matches. He scored two goals and provided three assists, including a stoppage time tally as part of a 3–2 victory over Forward Madison on 9 July. Mentzingen finished the season with six goals and a team-high seven assists from 24 appearances in all competitions. He was one of three Ignite players named to the League One All-League Second Team for their efforts. Nine days after Lansing was eliminated from the playoffs, the club folded due to financial difficulties; Mentzingen was therefore released from his contract and became a free agent.

=== Memphis 901 ===
After the Ignite folded, Mentzingen joined USL Championship club Memphis 901 on 15 January 2020. He made his debut for the club on 7 March, playing 16 minutes off the bench in a 4–2 defeat against Indy Eleven. Although that marked Mentzingen's only appearance before the season was halted due to the COVID-19 pandemic, he kept his place in the team after the season was resumed, finishing the year with three goals and one assist from 13 appearances. The first of those goals came on 15 August, albeit in a 3–2 defeat against Charlotte Independence. Mentzingen missed the last two games of the season after being declared ineligible for a violation of team rules. His contract with Memphis expired at the end of the season, with rumors from his native Brazil stating that he was the subject of interest from Campeonato Brasileiro Série B clubs.

=== Chattanooga Red Wolves ===
Mentzingen returned to USL League One for the 2021 season, signing with Chattanooga Red Wolves on 12 February. He missed the first seven games of the season due to an undisclosed injury, eventually making his club debut on 26 June against Greenville Triumph. Mentzingen scored his first goal for the Red Wolves on 14 July against Tormenta FC. After coming on as a substitute, his header in the 87th minute gave Chattanooga a 2–1 victory. Although he played the full 90 minutes in just three matches all season, one of those came in Chattanooga's final game. In the semifinals of the 2021 USL League One Playoffs, he played all 120 minutes as the Red Wolves were eliminated in extra time by Greenville. After finishing the year with one goal from 17 appearances, Mentzingen had his contract option exercised by Chattanooga.

Mentzingen finished 2022 with eight goals and four assists, scoring two of those goals in the League One playoffs.

=== North Carolina FC ===
On 29 December 2022, Mentzingen signed with North Carolina FC ahead of the 2023 season.

=== Detroit City FC (second stint) ===
On 1 April 2026, Detroit City FC, now in the pro USL Championship ranks compared to when he was with the team in 2018, announced they had signed Mentzingen to a contract for the 2026 season.

== Personal life ==
Mentzingen is the oldest of two children to his parents, Dárcio and Adriana. Growing up, he was a supporter of Flamengo and has said that his boyhood dream was to play for the club. Mentzingen graduated from Valparaiso University with a Bachelor of Science in economics. In 2021, he married Megan (née Cross) in Hamilton County, Tennessee.

During his sophomore year at Bryan College, Mentzingen was on the roster of the Lions' men's volleyball team. He appeared as a substitute in two matches on March 25, 2017, playing one set each of a victory over Bluefield and a defeat against Cincinnati Christian.

== Career statistics ==
As of 29 December 2022

Appearances and goals by club, season and competition
Club	Season	League			Cup (Note: All appearances in the U.S. Open Cup)		Continental		Other		Total	
Club	Season	Division	Apps	Goals	Apps	Goals	Apps	Goals	Apps	Goals	Apps	Goals
Southern West Virginia King's Warriors	2016	PDL	0	0	—		—		—		0	0
Lansing United	2017	NPSL	9	9	—		—		—		9	9
Detroit City	2018	NPSL	6	3	2	0	—		—		8	3
Lansing Ignite	2019	USL League One	21	6	2	0	—		1 (Note: Appearance(s) in the USL League One playoffs)	0	24	6
Memphis 901	2020	USL Championship	13	3	—		—		—		13	3
Chattanooga Red Wolves	2021	USL League One	15	1	—		—		2	0	17	1
Chattanooga Red Wolves	2022	USL League One	30	6	1	0	—		3	2	34	8
Chattanooga Red Wolves	Total		45	7	1	0	0	0	5	2	51	9
North Carolina FC	2023	USL League One	0	0	0	0	—		0	0	0	0
Career total			94	28	5	0	0	0	6	2	105	30

== Honors ==
Bryan

- Appalachian Athletic Conference (regular season): 2015

Individual

- AAC Freshman of the Year: 2015
- All-AAC First Team: 2015, 2016
- AAC All-Tournament Team: 2016
- NAIA Second Team All-America: 2016
- Lansing United Player of the Year: 2017
- Missouri Valley Conference All-Tournament Team: 2017
- All-MVC First Team: 2017, 2018
- United Soccer Coaches All-West Region Second Team: 2017, 2018
- USL League One All-League Second Team: 2019
