= Ronayne Marsh-Brown =

English footballer

Personal information
- Full name: Ronayne Benjamin Marsh-Brown
- Birth name: Ronayne Jentil Benjamin
- Date of birth: 13 November 1984 (age 41)
- Place of birth: Chiswick, England
- Height: 1.78 m (5 ft 10 in)
- Position: Left back

Team information
- Current team: Biggleswade Town

Senior career*
Years	Team	Apps	(Gls)
2005–2006	Fisher Athletic		
2006	Welling United		
2006–2007	Folkestone Invicta		
2007	Crawley Town	3	(0)
2007	Ramsgate		
2007–2008	Macclesfield Town	3	(0)
2008–2009	Maidenhead United		
2009	Dorchester Town		
2009–2010	Bath City		
2010	Staines Town		
2010–2011	Harrow Borough		
2011–2013	Northwood	23	(2)
2013	Wingate & Finchley		
2013–2014	Aylesbury United	19	(0)
2014–2015	Wingate & Finchley	41	(0)
2015–2016	Metropolitan Police		
2016	Lewes		
2016–2017	Farnborough		
2017	Bedford Town	14	(0)
2017–2018	St Neots Town	7	(0)
2018	Whitehawk	10	(0)
2018	East Thurrock United		
2018	Peterborough Sports		
2018	Marlow	5	(0)
2019–	Biggleswade Town		

International career
2018–2019	Guyana	6	(0)
- * Club domestic league appearances and goals as of 19:47, 14 April 2021 (UTC)

Ronayne Benjamin Marsh-Brown (born Ronayne Jentil Benjamin; 13 November 1984) is an English footballer who plays as a left-back for Southern League Division One Central side Biggleswade Town.

At the start of his career, playing under his former name of Ronayne Benjamin, he made three substitute appearances in Football League Two for Macclesfield Town in 2007. Since then he has played for numerous English non-league clubs.

== International career ==
Marsh-Brown debuted for the Guayana national team in a 2–2 CONCACAF Nations League tie with Barbados on 6 September 2018.

== Personal life ==
Marsh-Brown has three brothers, Kwai, Ky, and Keanu Marsh-Brown, who are all footballers. His younger brother Keanu is also a full international for Guyana, whilst Ky and Keanu received callups to represent the Antigua and Barbuda national team.
