= 2020 Memphis 901 FC season =

Memphis 901 FC
2020 season
- Head coach: Tim Mulqueen (until September 15); Ben Pirmann, interim (since September 15)
- Stadium: AutoZone Park; Memphis, Tennessee
- USL: Group G: 4th Conference: 11th
- USL Playoffs: Did not qualify
- 2020 U.S. Open Cup: Cancelled
- Top goalscorer: Cal Jennings (9)
- Highest home attendance: 8,571 (March 7 v. IND)
- Lowest home attendance: 901 (Aug 8 v. NC); 901 (Oct 3 v. BHM)
- Average home league attendance: 3,458
- Biggest win: CLT 1–3 MEM (Sept. 26); MEM 3–1 BHM (Oct. 3)
- Biggest defeat: BHM 3–0 MEM (July 15); LOU 4–1 MEM (Sept. 19)

The 2020 Memphis 901 FC season was the second season for Memphis 901 FC in the USL Championship (USLC), the second-tier professional soccer league in the United States and Canada. The regular season was originally scheduled to be played between March 6 and October 17 with a 10-team playoff between October 21 and November 16. USL suspended operations on March 12 due to the COVID-19 pandemic and resumed in a limited capacity on July 11; the regular season was shortened to 16 matches and played in regional groups.

== Season in review ==
=== Background, off-season and pre-season ===
Memphis finished their inaugural season of 2019 in 15th place among the 18-team eastern conference, five spots below the playoff positions, although they did enter the final week of the regular season with a mathematical chance of making the playoffs. The club announced in November that nine players, mostly starters, from the inaugural season would be retained for the 2020 campaign. In January, the club announced that minority owner Tim Howard would be taking on the role of Sporting Director. Beginning in mid-January, the club announced several player signings: defenders Zach Carroll and Mark Segbers, midfielders Rafael Mentzingen, Michael Reed, and Jean-Christophe Koffi, UK League One-experienced winger Keanu Marsh-Brown, and goalkeeper Jimmy Hague. In early February, the club announced their pre-season schedule, with exhibitions scheduled against clubs from the USL Championship and League One, as well as NCAA Divisions I and III.

The club began its preseason campaign by dropping a match 2–1 away to Saint Louis FC on February 8. The second preseason match on February 22 produced a 3–1 win over USL League One side Forward Madison. The preseason campaign was finished on February 29 with a 1–0 win against the NCCA D-I University of Memphis men's team.

On March 4, in the run-up to the season opener, the club announced that minority owner and sporting director Tim Howard was coming out of retirement to play in goal.

=== March ===
In their season opener in front of a record crowd, the club went up 2-0 after only 16 minutes, then conceded four unanswered goals through the remainder of the match to fall 4–2 to Indy. In response to the COVID-19 pandemic, the league suspended play for 30 days beginning March 12. On March 19, the suspension was further extended to May 10.

=== June ===
On June 4, the league announced a tentative date of July 11 for a resumption of play. Later, the league announced that upon resumption of play, teams would be separated into eight regional groups and play enough matches to complete a 16-game schedule. On June 26, the league announced that Memphis was to be placed into Group G with other regional clubs including Birmingham, Charlotte, and North Carolina.

=== July ===
Memphis began their Return To Play campaign in Group G on July 15 with a 0–3 loss on the road at Birmingham. Despite dominating first-half possession with 64%, Memphis conceded three goals before the half-time break. Three days later, the club secured its first point of the season with a 2–2 draw away to Atlanta United 2. The tie was secured by a stoppage time goal from Cal Jennings in only his second professional appearance. In their first home match after the Return To Play restart, the club secured another point with another 2–2 draw versus Charlotte.

=== August ===
Memphis began the month by scoring their first competitive win of the season at home versus St. Louis. Keanu Marsh-Brown scored the go-ahead goal in the 54th minute, with the defense protecting the lead by limiting St. Louis to one shot on goal through the remainder of the match. The club finished their 3-match homestand with a 0–1 loss to North Carolina FC. Akeem Ward scored for NCFC in the 38th minute and the team was unable to equalize despite controlling possession with 55% in the 1st half and 56% in the 2nd half. The club followed that performance with a draw on the road against group leaders Birmingham. 901 held a 2–1 lead onwards from the 28th minute, but the Legion earned a penalty kick in stoppage time to claim a draw. The club's final match of the month away to North Carolina was postponed in the midst of the reactions to the shooting of Jacob Blake in Kenosha, Wisconsin.

=== September ===
The club began a busy month of seven matches, six scheduled and one rescheduled, by losing at home to Charlotte 0–2. The match was particularly bad for Keanu Marsh-Brown who failed to convert a penalty kick in the eighth minute, then had a corner kick deflect off of him in the 32nd minute to put Charlotte on the scoreboard with an own goal. Next, 901 earned another point with a draw against group leaders Birmingham, this time at home with each club scoring one goal. The rescheduling of the postponed August 29 match created a situation that had the club playing North Carolina on the road twice in three days. In the first match, Memphis scored their second competitive win of the season by the score of 3–2, courtesy of a stoppage time goal from Matt Hundley. In the second match, Memphis surrendered a two-goal lead for the fourth time during the season in a 2–3 loss.

On September 15 the club announced that inaugural manager Tim Mulqueen was being relieved of his duties, with assistant coach Ben Pirmann stepping in to fill the vacancy in the interim. The team began the post-Mulqueen era with a 4–1 loss away at Louisville. The lone bright spot in the match for 901 was rookie Cal Jennings scoring his third goal in only two matches. Following the postponement of their September 23 match at NCFC, the 901 notched a 3–1 victory away versus Charlotte on the 26th. Despite four internal disciplinary suspensions that left the team with only three available substitutes, another Cal Jennings brace of goals propelled them to the victory.

=== October ===
Memphis finished their season with another 3–1 victory, at home against Birmingham on this occasion. 901 FC's entire scoring output consisted of a hat trick from Cal Jennings. Due to both Memphis and North Carolina FC being mathematically eliminated from playoff contention, league policy cancelled the clubs' postponed September 23 match, leaving both clubs with fifteen played matches.

== Roster ==
As of October 6, 2020

No.	Position	Player	Nation
1	GK	USA	Tim Howard
2	DF	USA	Mark Segbers
3	DF	USA	Zach Carroll
4	DF	ENG	Liam Doyle
5	DF	TRI	Triston Hodge (on loan from W Connection)
6	MF	USA	Dan Metzger
7	MF	USA	Raul Gonzalez
8	DF	USA	Marc Burch
9	FW	GUY	Keanu Marsh-Brown
10	MF	CIV	Jean-Christophe Koffi
11	FW	USA	Pierre da Silva
12	GK	USA	Jimmy Hague
14	MF	BRA	Rafael Mentzingen
15	DF	USA	Jackson Morse
16	MF	USA	Tommy McCabe
17	MF	USA	Michael Reed
19	DF	USA	Rece Buckmaster
20	MF	ENG	Jose Baxter
21	MF	TRI	Duane Muckette
23	MF	TRI	Leston Paul
24	DF	USA	Jacob Hauser-Ramsey
25	GK	USA	Jim Barkei
26	FW	USA	Cal Jennings
29	FW	USA	Brandon Allen
70	FW	USA	Matt Hundley

== Competitions ==
=== Exhibitions ===
February 8 Preseason 1	Saint Louis FC	2–1	Memphis 901 FC	Fenton, MO
1:00 PM CST	Greig 15'; Academy Trialist 56'	901 Report; StL Report	Burch 64'	Stadium: West Community Stadium

February 22 Preseason 2	Memphis 901 FC	3–1	Forward Madison FC	Birmingham, AL
4:00 PM CST	Allen 53'; Metzger 69', 84'	Report	Banks 89' (pen.)	Stadium: Goldfarb Field

February 23 Preseason 3	Birmingham-Southern College	v	Memphis 901 FC	Birmingham, AL
TBD PM CST				Stadium: Goldfarb Field

February 29 Preseason 4	Memphis 901 FC	1–0	Memphis Tigers	Memphis, TN
6:00 PM CST	Hundley 71'	Report		Stadium: AutoZone Park

=== USL Championship ===
==== Standings — Group G ====
Pos	Team	Pld	W	D	L	GF	GA	GD	Pts	PPG	Qualification
1	Charlotte Independence	16	8	4	4	24	22	+2	28	1.75	Advance to USL Championship Playoffs
2	Birmingham Legion FC	16	7	4	5	29	19	+10	25	1.56	Advance to USL Championship Playoffs
3	North Carolina FC	15	6	1	8	17	21	−4	19	1.27	
4	Memphis 901 FC	15	4	4	7	24	31	−7	16	1.07	

Source: USL

==== Match results ====
The league announced opening home matches for the season on January 6, 2020. In the preparations for the resumption of league play, the remainder of Memphis' schedule was announced on July 2.

March 7 1	Memphis 901 FC	2–4	Indy Eleven	Memphis, TN
6:00 PM CST	Allen 9'; Burch (yellow card) 12'; Carroll 16'; Muckette (yellow card) 17'	Report	Contreras (yellow card) 11'; Carleton (yellow card) 13'; Ayoze 45+3', (yellow card) 88'; Pasher 69', 72'; Haworth 83'	Stadium: AutoZone Park; Attendance: 8,571; Referee: Matthew Thompson

July 15 2	Birmingham Legion FC	3–0	Memphis 901 FC	Birmingham, AL
6:00 PM CDT	Lapa 22', 41'; Servania (yellow card) 30'; Wright 31'; Crognale (yellow card) 52'	Report	da Silva (yellow card) 27'; Carroll (red card) 58'	Stadium: BBVA Compass Field; Referee: Matthew Thompson
Note: Televised live on ESPN2

July 18 3	Atlanta United 2	2–2	Memphis 901 FC	Kennesaw, GA
6:30 PM CDT	Conway 21'; Gannon 57'; Diop (yellow card) 67'; Gurr (yellow card) 78'; Jawneh (yellow card) 90+7'	Report	Doyle (yellow card) 16'; Allen 44'; Hodge (yellow card) 74'; Segbers (yellow card) 90'; Jennings 90+2'	Stadium: Fifth Third Bank Stadium; Referee: Sergii Demianchuk

July 25 4	Memphis 901 FC	2–2	Charlotte Independence	Memphis, TN
7:30 PM CDT	Allen 16'; Buckmaster 56', (yellow card) 86'; Reed (yellow card) 90+2'	Report	Etou (yellow card) 37'; Kelly (yellow card) 45+1'; Haakenson 51'; Sabella 83'	Stadium: AutoZone Park; Referee: Ben Meyer

August 1 5	Memphis 901 FC	1–0	Saint Louis FC	Memphis, TN
7:30 PM CDT	Muckette (yellow card) 11'; Marsh-Brown 54'; Koffi (yellow card) 69'; Paul (yellow card) 90'; Hodge (yellow card) 90+2'; Segbers (yellow card) 90+6'	Report	Rivas (yellow card) 64'	Stadium: Autozone Park; Referee: Matt Thompson

August 8 6	Memphis 901 FC	0–1	North Carolina FC	Memphis, TN
4:00 PM CDT	Paul (yellow card) 65'	Report	Ward (yellow card) 15', (goal) 38'; Fortune (yellow card) 21'	Stadium: AutoZone Park; Attendance: 901; Referee: Matthew Thompson

August 15 7	Charlotte Independence	3–2	Memphis 901 FC	Matthews, NC
6:00 PM CDT	Johnson (yellow card) 30'; Kelly 53'; Martinez 60' (pen.); Lacroix (yellow card) 65'; Haakenson 69'	Report	Segbers 13', (yellow card) 72'; Mentzingen 51'; Muckette (yellow card) 90+4'	Stadium: Sportsplex at Matthews; Referee: Elvis Osmanovic

August 22 8	Birmingham Legion FC	2–2	Memphis 901 FC	Birmingham, AL
6:30 PM CDT	Lapa 12'; Asiedu (yellow card) 24'; Akinyode (yellow card) 28'; Brett 90+8' (pen.)	Report	Mentzingen 18', (yellow card) 90+4'; Marsh-Brown 29' (pen.), (yellow card) 52'; Gonzalez (yellow card) 45'; Hague (yellow card) 90+2'	Stadium: BBVA Compass Field; Referee: Muhammad Hassan

August 29 9	North Carolina FC	P–P	Memphis 901 FC	Cary, NC
TBA PM CDT				Stadium: WakeMed Soccer Park
Note: Postponed as part of the protests over the shooting of Jacob Blake

September 2 10	Memphis 901 FC	0–2	Charlotte Independence	Memphis, TN
7:00 PM CDT	Marsh-Brown (penalty missed) 8'; Paul (yellow card) 56'	Report	Marsh-Brown 32' (o.g.); Haakenson 45+3'	Stadium: AutoZone Park; Referee: Tori Penso

September 5 11	Memphis 901 FC	1–1	Birmingham Legion FC	Memphis, TN
7:00 PM CDT	Baxter (yellow card) 25'; Marsh-Brown 28'; Metzger (yellow card) 61' (yellow-red card) 73'	Report	E. Crognale (yellow card) 43'; Lapa 48' (pen.), (yellow card) 89'	Stadium: AutoZone Park; Referee: Jervis Atagana

September 10 9	North Carolina FC	2–3	Memphis 901 FC	Cary, NC
6:00 PM CDT	Pecka (yellow card) 45+1'; Fortune (yellow card) 64'; Kristo 86'; Taylor 90+1', (yellow card) 90+7'	Report	Mentzingen 30'; Baxter (yellow card) 36'; Paul (yellow card) 55'; Hundley 75', 90+8'; Jennings (yellow card) 89'	Stadium: WakeMed Soccer Park; Referee: John Matto
Note: Re-schedule of postponed August 29 match.

September 13 12	North Carolina FC	3–2	Memphis 901 FC	Cary, NC
5:00 PM CDT	Barry (yellow card) 29', (goal) 58'; Donovan 55'; Ward (yellow card) 65'; Albadawi 89'	Report	Jennings 24', 35'; Carroll (yellow card) 45+1'	Stadium: WakeMed Soccer Park; Referee: John Griggs
Note: Match originally scheduled for September 12.

September 19 13	Louisville City FC	4–1	Memphis 901 FC	Louisville, KY
6:30 PM CDT	Lancaster 14', 72'; Ownby 24'; Hoppenot (yellow card) 70'; Bone 84'	Report	Jennings 44'	Stadium: Louisville Slugger Field; Referee: Nabil Bensalah

September 23 14	Memphis 901 FC	v	North Carolina FC	Memphis, TN
7:00 PM CDT				Stadium: AutoZone Park
Note: Postponed after a member of the Memphis 901 FC organization tested positive for COVID-19.

September 26 15	Charlotte Independence	1–3	Memphis 901 FC	Matthews, NC
6:00 PM CDT	Roberts (yellow card) 12'; Kelly 24'; Sabella (yellow card) 33'; Etou (yellow card) 68'; Dimick (yellow card) 82'	Report	Paul (yellow card) 20'; Baxter 41'; Jennings 43', 86'; McCabe (yellow card) 89'; Allen (yellow card) 90+1'	Stadium: Sportsplex at Matthews; Referee: Eric Tattersall

October 3 16	Memphis 901 FC	3–1	Birmingham Legion FC	Memphis, TN
7:00 PM CDT	Jennings 36', 54', 86'; Muckette (yellow card) 43'; Marsh-Brown (yellow card) 79'	Report	A. Crognale (yellow card) 23'; Lopez (yellow card) 33'; Lapa 41'; Williams (yellow card) 66'	Stadium: AutoZone Park; Attendance: 901; Referee: Ben Meyer

=== U.S. Open Cup ===
As a USL Championship club, Memphis will enter the competition in the Second Round, to be played April 7–9.

April 8 2nd round	Memphis 901 FC (Tennessee)	P–P	(Tennessee) Chattanooga FC	Memphis, TN
7:00 PM CST				Stadium: Mike Rose Soccer Complex
Note: Match postponed due to the COVID-19 pandemic

=== Statistics ===
As of October 6, 2020 Source: Memphis901FC.com

Numbers after plus-sign(+) denote appearances as a substitute.

==== Appearances and goals ====
No.	Pos	Nat	Player	Total		USL Championship Regular Season		Playoffs	
No.	Pos	Nat	Player	Apps	Goals	Apps	Goals	Apps	Goals
21	MF	(Trinidad and Tobago) TRI	Duane Muckette	15	0	11+4	0	0	0
29	FW	(United States) USA	Brandon Allen	15	3	9+6	3	0	0
19	DF	(United States) USA	Rece Buckmaster	14	1	14+0	1	0	0
23	MF	(Trinidad and Tobago) TRI	Leston Paul	14	0	10+4	0	0	0
26	FW	(United States) USA	Cal Jennings	14	9	6+8	9	0	0
9	FW	(Guyana) GUY	Keanu Marsh-Brown	13	3	12+1	3	0	0
3	DF	(United States) USA	Zach Carroll	13	1	11+2	1	0	0
14	MF	(Brazil) BRA	Rafael Mentzingen	13	3	8+5	3	0	0
17	MF	(United States) USA	Michael Reed	12	2	7+5	2	0	0
2	DF	(United States) USA	Mark Segbers	10	1	10+0	1	0	0
5	DF	(Trinidad and Tobago) TRI	Triston Hodge	10	0	9+1	0	0	0
10	MF	(Ivory Coast) CIV	Jean-Christophe Koffi	10	0	8+2	0	0	0
70	FW	(United States) USA	Matt Hundley	10	2	2+8	2	0	0
12	GK	(United States) USA	Jimmy Hague	9	0	9+0	0	0	0
8	DF	(United States) USA	Marc Burch	8	0	7+1	0	0	0
20	MF	(England) ENG	Jose Baxter	8	1	6+2	1	0	0
4	DF	Isle of Man	Liam Doyle	8	0	6+2	0	0	0
16	MF	(United States) USA	Tommy McCabe	7	0	7+0	0	0	0
7	MF	(United States) USA	Raul Gonzalez	7	0	3+4	0	0	0
1	GK	(United States) USA	Tim Howard	6	0	6+0	0	0	0
11	FW	(United States) USA	Pierre da Silva	4	0	3+1	0	0	0
6	MF	(United States) USA	Dan Metzger	4	0	1+3	0	0	0
24	DF	(United States) USA	Jacob Hauser-Ramsey	3	0	1+2	0	0	0
