= Keanu Marsh-Brown =

English-born Guyanese footballer

Personal information
- Full name: Keanu Marqheal Marsh-Brown
- Date of birth: 10 August 1992 (age 34)
- Place of birth: Hammersmith, England
- Height: 1.82 m (6 ft 0 in)
- Position: Attacking midfielder

Team information
- Current team: Newport City

Youth career
- 2002–2004: Arsenal
- 2004–2009: Fulham

Senior career*
Years	Team	Apps	(Gls)
2009–2011	Fulham	0	(0)
2011	→ Milton Keynes Dons (loan)	17	(2)
2011	→ Dundee United (loan)	1	(0)
2012	Oldham Athletic	11	(1)
2012–2013	Yeovil Town	21	(1)
2013–2015	Barnet	53	(14)
2015–2018	Forest Green Rovers	90	(20)
2018	→ Dover Athletic (loan)	6	(4)
2018–2019	Newport County	17	(1)
2020	Memphis 901	13	(3)
2020–2021	Gloucester City	4	(1)
2021	Wrexham	3	(0)
2021–2022	East Riffa		
2022–2023	Kuching City		
2023	Gloucester City	0	(0)
2023	FF Jaro	1	(0)
2024–2025	Kuching City		
2025–2026	Odi Sports Club		
2026–	Newport City	3	(0)

International career^{‡}
2007	England U16	4	(0)
2008	England U17	11	(0)
2013–2016	England C	6	(0)
2019–	Guyana	16	(1)
- * Club domestic league appearances and goals as of 09:42, 27 October 2026 (UTC) ‡ National team caps and goals as of 19:35, 10 April 2021 (UTC)

Keanu Marqheal Marsh-Brown (born 10 August 1992) is a professional footballer who plays as an attacking midfielder or winger for Cymru South club Newport City.

He began his professional career with Fulham in the Premier League but failed to make a first team appearance, spending time on loan with Milton Keynes Dons and Dundee United before signing a permanent contract with Oldham Athletic and later Yeovil Town and Barnet. He played a key role in the Forest Green Rovers side that won promotion to the Football League in 2017 following disappointment in the previous campaign as the club were defeated in the 2016 National League play-off final with Marsh-Brown scoring in a 3–1 defeat. He went on to have short lived spells with both Dover Athletic and Newport County before moving to the United States with Memphis 901 in 2020. He has since played football in Bahrain and Malaysia respectively with East Riffa and Kuching City, sandwiched between spells back in the United Kingdom with Wrexham and twice with Gloucester City.

Born in England, he represents Guyana internationally, he initially represented England at U16, U17 and C team level before switching his allegiance in 2019.

== Club career ==
=== Fulham ===
Marsh-Brown graduated through the Fulham Academy to sign professional forms in summer 2009. He was on the bench for a number of Fulham's key knock-out games during their run to the 2010 UEFA Europa League Final, including those against Shakhtar Donetsk and Juventus, but he remained on the bench on each occasion. In November 2010, there were reports that both Tottenham Hotspur and Manchester City were considering making £500,000 offers for the player. In January 2011, Marsh-Brown signed an extension to his contract, keeping him at the club until June 2013. Later that month he joined League One side Milton Keynes Dons on a one-month loan deal. Impressing the Dons, his loan spell was extended to the end of the season. He made his senior debut on 2 February 2011, replacing Lewis Guy 68 minutes into a 2–1 win at Bristol Rovers. Three days later he got his second start, in a 2–2 draw with Sheffield Wednesday at Hillsborough. On 12 February, he scored his first senior goal, earning the Dons a 1–1 draw at home to Brentford. On 30 August 2011, Marsh-Brown signed on loan for Dundee United until mid January 2012, with the option to extend the deal until the end of the 2011–12 season. He joined his Fulham teammate Lauri Dalla Valle at Dundee United, who have links with Fulham via their reserve team coach, ex-United player Billy McKinlay. After only one appearance he returned to Fulham. In November 2011, Marsh-Brown left Fulham by mutual consent.

=== Oldham Athletic ===
After a two-week trial, Marsh-Brown joined League One side Oldham Athletic on 30 January 2012 on a deal to the end of the season, with an option to extend for a further season. Oldham manager Paul Dickov said: "I saw a lot of Keanu last season and he looked one of the best players in our division. The boy has bags and bags of ability, as well as raw pace, and he is a signing who excites me having followed his career for a long time."

He made his club debut the same day as a substitute in a Football League Trophy match against Chesterfield. He scored his first goal for Oldham in a 1–1 draw against Colchester United on 28 February. Marsh-Brown received a red card for a two-footed tackle in a 2–1 loss against Scunthorpe United on 6 March.

=== Yeovil Town ===
On 29 May 2012, Marsh-Brown joined League One side Yeovil Town following his release from Oldham Athletic and signed a one-year deal.

He scored in Yeovil's 3–0 win over Colchester United in the League Cup on 14 August 2012 and got the opening goal against Scunthorpe on 25 August 2012 in a 4–0 win for Yeovil.

On 25 January 2013, having fallen out of favour at Yeovil Town the club and Marsh-Brown agreed to cancel his contract by mutual agreement.

=== Barnet ===
Marsh-Brown joined Barnet on 28 March 2013 until the end of the season. He scored the winner on his debut against AFC Wimbledon on 1 April 2013. In June 2013, he signed with Barnet for the 2013–14 season. After 13 goals for the Bees in 2013–14, Marsh-Brown was transfer-listed to raise funds. Manager Martin Allen said: "As a club we need to increase the funds in the budget, I have explained this to Keanu and he can, without a shadow of a doubt, go on to play in League One and win games".

Marsh-Brown fell out of favour in the 2014–15 season, with Mauro Vilhete, Lee Cook, Luisma and Adam Mekki all preferred by Martin Allen. Bids from Blackpool and Luton Town on transfer deadline day were rejected by the club, while the player himself turned down a move to Forest Green Rovers. He had a trial Peterborough United in November 2014.

Marsh-Brown made just 11 appearances in all competitions in the 2014–15 season. Notably, he was not given a league winner's medal at the end of the season, unlike other players who had made fewer appearances. In June 2015, the Bees took up an option to extend Marsh-Brown's contract.

=== Forest Green Rovers ===
Marsh-Brown joined Forest Green on trial in June 2015, and later signed on a two-year deal for an undisclosed fee. He made his debut on the first day of the 2015–16 season in a 1–0 away win over Altrincham.

He helped the club reach the 2015–16 National League play-offs, and scored the semi-final winning goal against Dover Athletic on 7 May 2016 that helped the club reach the play-off final. He played the full 90 minutes in the play-off final at Wembley Stadium on 15 May 2016, scoring with a long-range strike, but could not prevent the club missing out on promotion to the Football League in a 3–1 loss to Grimsby Town.

The following 2016-17 National League season saw him play again at Wembley Stadium with Forest Green for the play-off final which this time saw a 3–1 win over Tranmere Rovers earn the club a first ever promotion to the Football League.

At the end of the 2017–18 season, Forest Green announced that Marsh-Brown would be one of the players that would not be offered a new contract at the club.

Marsh-Brown joined National League team Dover Athletic on loan from Forest Green in March 2018. He scored twice on his debut at home against leaders Macclesfield Town as Dover won 2–0. He was used mainly as a substitute for the rest of the season making just one more start the following week away at Barrow. He scored late on in the final day away at Woking as Dover won 2–1, relegating Woking but finishing outside of the play-offs on goal difference.

=== Newport County ===
On 22 June 2018 Marsh-Brown joined Newport County on a two-year deal. He made his debut for Newport on 4 August 2018 in a 3-0 League Two defeat against Mansfield Town. On 30 March 2019 he scored his first goal for Newport in the 3-1 League Two win against Yeovil Town. He was part of the team that reached the League Two playoff final at Wembley Stadium on 25 May 2019. Newport lost to Tranmere Rovers, 1–0 after a goal in the 119th minute.

His contract at Newport was terminated by mutual consent on 23 December 2019.

=== Moves abroad and return to Non-league ===
On 17 January 2020, USL Championship side Memphis 901 FC announced his signature.

On 22 December 2020, Marsh-Brown joined National League North side Gloucester City.

On 10 April 2021, Marsh-Brown joined Wrexham on a non-contract basis, one of three signings that day. He made three appearances for the Welsh club before the end of the season. He was not offered a contract, but was invited back to pre-season training in summer 2021.

Marsh-Brown signed for Bahraini Premier League club East Riffa in September 2021.

In February 2022, Marsh-Brown joined Malaysia Premier League side Kuching City.

Marsh-Brown returned to Gloucester in April 2023, featuring as an unused substitute on two occasions.

In July 2023, Marsh-Brown signed for Ykkönen side FF Jaro on a deal until the end of the season.

In December 2025 he moved to the Maldives, signing for Odi Sports Club.

In September 2026 he returned to playing in the United Kingdom, joining Cymru South club Newport City.

== International career ==
Marsh-Brown has 4 caps for England U16 and 11 caps for England U17. He was called up to the England C squad for a friendly against a Latvia U-23 team on 10 September 2013, and played the entire game, which England lost 1–0. He was capped six times between 2013 and 2016.

In March 2015, Marsh-Brown was called up to the Antigua and Barbuda squad for a training camp ahead of 2018 FIFA World Cup qualification, alongside younger brother Kyjuon.

In March 2019 he was called up to the Guyana squad alongside his older brother Ronayne Marsh-Brown. He made his international debut for Guyana on 23 March 2019 against Belize and claimed an assist for the second goal in the 2–1 win.

== Personal life ==
Marsh-Brown has three brothers, Kwai, Ky, and Ronayne Marsh-Brown, who are all footballers. His older brother Ronayne also represents the Guyana national team.

== Career statistics ==
=== Club ===
As of match played 22 May 2021

Appearances and goals by club, season and competition
Club	Season	League			National Cup		League Cup		Other		Total	
Club	Season	Division	Apps	Goals	Apps	Goals	Apps	Goals	Apps	Goals	Apps	Goals
Fulham	2009–10	Premier League	0	0	0	0	0	0	0	0	0	0
Fulham	2010–11	Premier League	0	0	0	0	0	0	—		0	0
Fulham	2011–12	Premier League	0	0	0	0	0	0	0	0	0	0
Fulham	Total		0	0	0	0	0	0	0	0	0	0
Milton Keynes Dons (loan)	2010–11	League One	17	2	—		—		2 (Note: Appearances in League One play-offs)	0	19	2
Dundee United (loan)	2011–12	Scottish Premier League	1	0	—		0	0	—		1	0
Oldham Athletic	2011–12	League One	11	1	—		0	0	1 (Note: Appearance(s) in Football League Trophy)	0	12	1
Yeovil Town	2012–13	League One	21	1	1	0	2	1	3	0	27	2
Barnet	2012–13	League Two	5	1	—		—		—		5	1
Barnet	2013–14	Conference Premier	38	11	2	1	—		2 (Note: Appearance(s) in FA Trophy)	1	42	13
Barnet	2014–15	Conference Premier	10	2	0	0	—		1	0	11	2
Barnet	Total		53	14	2	1	—		3	0	58	15
Forest Green Rovers	2015–16	National League	43	8	3	1	—		4 (Note: Three appearances and two goals in National League play-offs, one in FA Trophy)	2	50	11
Forest Green Rovers	2016–17	National League	33	10	0	0	—		3 (Note: Appearances in the National League play-offs)	1	36	11
Forest Green Rovers	2017–18	League Two	14	2	2	0	1	0	2 (Note: Appearances in EFL Trophy)	0	19	2
Forest Green Rovers	Total		90	20	5	2	1	0	9	3	105	24
Dover Athletic	2017–18	National League	6	4	—		—		—		6	4
Newport County	2018–19	League Two	16	1	1	0	2	0	2 (Note: One appearance in EFL Trophy, one appearance in League Two play-offs)	0	21	1
Newport County	2019–20	League Two	0	0	0	0	0	0	0	0	0	0
Newport County	Total		16	1	1	0	2	0	2	0	21	1
Memphis 901	2020	USL Championship	13	3	—		—		—		13	3
Gloucester City	2020–21	National League North	5	1	—		—		1	0	6	1
Wrexham	2020–21	National League	3	0	—		—		—		3	0
East Riffa	2021–22	Bahraini Premier League	No data currently available									
Career total			236	47	9	1	5	1	21	4	271	53

=== International ===
Appearances and goals by national team and year
National team	Year	Apps	Goals
Guyana
Guyana	2019	11	1
Guyana	2021	5	0
Total		16	1

=== International goals ===
Scores and results list Guyana's goal tally first.

No.	Date	Venue	Opponent	Score	Result	Competition
1.	11 June 2019	Centro de Alto Rendimiento, Alajuela, Costa Rica	Haiti	1–3	1–3	Friendly

== Honours ==
Odi Sports Club

- President's Cup: 2026
