= Montevallo Falcons =

- University: University of Montevallo
- Nickname: Falcons
- NCAA: Division II
- Conference: Gulf South (primary); Peach Belt (men's lacrosse, eSports)
- Athletic director: Mark Richard
- Location: Montevallo, Alabama
- Varsity teams: 22 (11 men's, 11 women's)
- Basketball arena: Trustmark Arena
- Baseball stadium: Kermit A. Johnson Field at Bob Riesener Stadium
- Softball stadium: Softball Stadium at Orr Park
- Soccer stadium: Varsity Soccer Field
- Aquatics center: SAC Natatorium
- Lacrosse stadium: Track and Field / Lacrosse Stadium
- Tennis venue: Tennis Court Complex
- Colors: Purple and gold
- Mascot: Freddie Falcon
- Website: montevallofalcons.com

Team NCAA championships
- 2024 NCAA Division II National Champion Gabe Hixenbaugh in inaugural year for the wrestling program. Coached by Daniel Ownbey.

The Montevallo Falcons are the athletic teams that represent the University of Montevallo, in Montevallo, Alabama, in intercollegiate sports at the Division II level of the National Collegiate Athletic Association (NCAA). The Falcons have primarily competed in the Gulf South Conference since the 2017–18 academic year. Rivals include West Alabama, Auburn Montgomery, Alabama–Huntsville, and North Alabama.

Montevallo competes in 22 intercollegiate varsity sports. Men's sports include baseball, basketball, cross country, golf, lacrosse, soccer, swimming, tennis, track and field (indoor and outdoor), and wrestling; while women's sports include basketball, cross country, golf, lacrosse, soccer, softball, swimming, tennis, track and field (indoor and outdoor), and volleyball.

== Conference affiliations ==
NCAA

- Gulf South Conference (1995–2009)
- Peach Belt Conference (2009–2017)
- Gulf South Conference (2017–present)

== Varsity teams ==
Men's sports	Women's sports
Baseball	Basketball
Basketball	Cross country
Cross country	Golf
Golf	Lacrosse
Lacrosse	Soccer
Soccer	Softball
Swimming	Swimming
Tennis	Tennis
Track and field^{†}	Track and field^{†}
Wrestling	Volleyball
† – Track and field includes both indoor and outdoor

=== Men's basketball ===
- 2004 GSC Champion
- 2004 NCAA South Region Finalist
- 2005 GSC Champion
- 2005 NCAA South Region Finalist
- 2006 NCAA South Region Champions
- 2006 NCAA Elite Eight Quarter finalists
- 2007 GSC Champion
- 2007 NCAA South Region Champions
- 2007 NCAA Elite Eight Quarter finalists
- 2010 NCAA Southeast Region Finalist
- 2011 NCAA Southeast Region Tournament
- 2012 PBC Tournament Champion
- 2012 NCAA Southeast Region Champions
- 2012 NCAA Division II National Finalist
- 2013 NCAA Southeast Region Tournament
- 2014 NCAA Southeast Region Finalist
- 2015 PBC Regular Season Champion
- 2015 PBC Tournament Champion
- 2015 NCAA Southeast Region Finalist
- The men's basketball team is led by coach Danny Young and assistant coach Brannan Anthony. Young, a native to Phoenix, Arizona, has brought considerable success to Montevallo's program after his arrival in 2003. He was named the Gulf South Conference East Division Coach of the Decade for 2000–2010, Peach Belt Conference Coach of the Year for 2015 and Southeast Region Coach of the Year for 2015.

=== Baseball ===
- 2006 NCAA South Central Region Champions
- 2006 NCAA National
- 2018 NCAA Regional
- 2023 NCAA Regional

Montevallo baseball was led by former head coach Robert Riesener in 1973. Riesener led the Falcons' program for 30 years and ended his career with a 937-671 record. The baseball team is now led by coach Chandler Rose with the help of assistant coaches Ben Jackson and Franklin Bush. Going into the 2020 season, Rose will continue to lead the team for his 10th season. Rose has made an impressive turnaround in the Falcons' baseball program. Leading the Falcons to an NCAA Regional in 2018 and the Peach Belt Conference tournament championship game twice during his tenure. Back-to-back appearances by the Falcons in 2013 and 2014 marked just the third and fourth time Montevallo has played in a conference tournament championship game in its NCAA Division II era. Montevallo baseball has had 28 players that have become professional baseball players one of which being Rusty Greer drafted by the Texas Rangers. Nine of these players of which were coached by Rose.

=== Men's soccer ===
- 1999 GSC Champions
- 2004 GSC Champions
- 2007 NCAA South Region Champions
- 2007 Final Four
- 2010 PBC Champions
- 2012 PBC Champions
- 2013 PBC Champions
- 2021 GSC Regular Season Champions

The team has been coached by Bruce Dietterle since 2013. Trey Gregory has been the assistant since 2016.

=== Men's cross country ===
The men's cross country team was founded in 2010. Michael Marquardt was coach for the inaugural season, and was succeeded by current coach Tommy Barksdale.

=== Softball ===
In 2013, the board of trustees voted to start a women's softball program during the 2014–2015 competition season. This addition brought the number of university sports offered to 13. During the 2014-2015 year, a track stadium was built for the women's and newly formed men's track and field team in the fall.

=== Men's wrestling ===
2024 NCAA Division II National Champion Gabe Hixenbaugh in inaugural year for the program. Coached by Daniel Ownbey.

== Notable alumni ==
=== Baseball ===
- Rusty Greer
- Jeff Segar
- Tony Cappolla

=== Men's basketball ===
- Javonte Douglas
- Nate Driggers
- Calvin Bowie
- Earl Ike

=== Men's soccer ===
- Jonny Guadarrama

=== Men's wrestling ===
- Gabe Hixenbaugh
