= Alex Tejera =

American soccer player (born 1996)

Personal information
- Full name: Alexander Tejera
- Date of birth: January 29, 1996 (age 30)
- Place of birth: Ossining, New York, United States
- Height: 1.88 m (6 ft 2 in)
- Position: Forward

Team information
- Current team: Stars FC

Youth career
- 2011–2014: New York Red Bulls

College career
Years	Team	Apps	(Gls)
2014–2017	Siena Saints		

Senior career*
Years	Team	Apps	(Gls)
2015–2017	New York Red Bulls U23	22	(10)
2018	Kingston Stockade	4	(2)
2019	Mar de Fondo		
2020–2021	Atlético Olympians		
2022	Valley United	8	(2)
2022–2023	Chattanooga Red Wolves	27	(3)
2024	Arizona Monsoon	4	(1)
2025–	Stars FC	0	(0)
- * Club domestic league appearances and goals as of April 1, 2025

Alexander Tejera (born January 29, 1996) is an American soccer player who plays as a forward for Stars FC in USL League Two.

== Career ==
=== Youth ===
Tejera attended Ossining High School, and was their youngest starter in varsity history and was named league MVP in addition to being an All-League and All-Section selection. Tejera also played with the New York Red Bulls academy from 2011 to 2014.

=== College ===
In 2014, Tejera committed to playing college soccer at Siena College. In his freshman season, he was named Second Team All-MAAC and only unanimous MAAC All-Rookie Team selection, College Soccer News Third Team All-Freshman selection, College Sports Madness MAAC Freshman of the Year, and was a NSCAA/Continental Tire All-Northeast Region Third Team honoree. Between 2015 and 2017, he scored 14 goals in 52 appearances.

While at college, Tejera also appeared in the USL PDL with New York Red Bulls U23, making 22 regular season appearances and scoring eleven goals between 2015 and 2017.

=== Early career ===
2018 saw Tejera play with NPSL side Kingston Stockade, scoring two goals in four games, before suffering a season-ending injury. He later spent a year with lower-league Uruguayan side Mar de Fondo, before returning to the United States and spending two seasons with UPSL with Atlético Olympians following a trial with Greenville Triumph.

Tejera's career in 2022 saw him appear in the NISA with Valley United, making eight league appearances and scoring two goals. Also appearing in the Lamar Hunt U.S. Open Cup against Phoenix Rising.

=== Chattanooga Red Wolves ===
On July 12, 2022, Tejera signed with USL League One club Chattanooga Red Wolves. He made his debut on July 16, 2022, appearing as a 75th–minute substitute during a 2–1 win over North Carolina FC.

== Personal life ==
Born in the United States, Tejera is of Uruguayan and Italian descent.
