= Jorge Luna (Venezuelan footballer) =

Venezuelan footballer (born 1994)

Personal information
- Full name: Jorge Andrés Luna Aguilar
- Date of birth: 26 January 1994 (age 32)
- Place of birth: Acarigua, Venezuela
- Height: 1.84 m (6 ft 0 in)
- Position: Centre-back

Youth career
- Centro Italo
- 2010–2011: Caracas
- 2011–2012: Guaraní
- 2012: Peñarol
- 2013: Liverpool

Senior career*
Years	Team	Apps	(Gls)
2014–2017	Portuguesa	68	(6)
2018	Atlético Venezuela	10	(0)
2019	Portuguesa	11	(0)
2019	Glacis United		
2020	Sportivo Luqueño		
2021–2022	Chattanooga Red Wolves	22	(1)
- * Club domestic league appearances and goals as of 16 October 2022

Jorge Andrés Luna Aguilar (born 26 January 1994) is a Venezuelan professional footballer who plays as a centre-back.

== Club career ==
Born in Acarigua, Luna began his career playing with local youth clubs Conejeros Fútbol Club and Punta de Piedra Fútbol Club before joining Centro Italo. He also played in local youth futsal leagues. In 2010, Luna moved into the youth setup of Primera División club Caracas before moving abroad the next season to Paraguay, joining Guaraní. He stayed with Guaraní for a season before moving to Uruguay and joining Peñarol in 2012 and Liverpool in 2013.

=== Portuguesa ===
During the 2013–14 season, Luna returned to Venezuela and joined the local Primera División club Portuguesa. He was promoted into the first-team squad and given his professional debut on 22 November 2014 against Deportivo La Guaira, starting in what would be a 1–0 defeat. Then, during the very next match, Luna scored his first professional goal. On 30 November, his 55th minute goal only served as a consolation in a 2–1 defeat against Zamora.

On 14 February 2016, Luna scored his first goal in over a year against Aragua, a 61st minute equalizer to help the match end in a 2–2 draw. The 2016 season would serve as Luna's breakout season, with him playing in 30 matches and scoring 3 goals. The next season, Luna would play in 24 matches, scoring 2 goals.

==== Atlético Venezuela ====
In December 2017, following the previous season, Luna signed with fellow Primera División club Atlético Venezuela. He made his debut for the club on 4 February 2018 against Monagas, starting in the 1–0 victory.

==== Return to Portuguesa ====
Following the 2018 season, Luna returned to Portuguesa. He made his debut back with the club on 26 January 2019 against Deportivo Anzoátegui, starting as the club won 2–1.

=== Glacis United and Sportivo Luqueño ===
In August 2019, Luna moved to Gibraltar and signed with National League club Glacis United. He stayed with the club for half a year before moving back to Paraguay and signing with Sportivo Luqueño.

=== Chattanooga Red Wolves ===
On 10 January 2021, Luna signed with American USL League One club Chattanooga Red Wolves. He made his debut for the club in their season opener on 8 May 2021 against North Texas SC, starting in his club's 1–0 victory.

== International career ==
Luna has represented Venezuela at the under-15 level, playing for the side during a youth tournament in 2009.

== Career statistics ==
As of match played 22 May 2021

Appearances and goals by club, season and competition
Club	Season	League			National cup		Continental		Total	
Club	Season	Division	Apps	Goals	Apps	Goals	Apps	Goals	Apps	Goals
Portuguesa	2014–15	Venezuelan Primera División	6	1	0	0	—		6	1
Portuguesa	2015	Venezuelan Primera División	8	0	0	0	—		8	0
Portuguesa	2016	Venezuelan Primera División	30	3	1	0	—		31	3
Portuguesa	2017	Venezuelan Primera División	24	2	0	0	—		24	2
Portuguesa	Total		68	6	2	0	0	0	70	6
Atlético Venezuela	2018	Venezuelan Primera División	10	0	1	0	—		11	0
Portuguesa	2019	Venezuelan Primera División	11	0	0	0	—		11	0
Chattanooga Red Wolves	2021	USL League One	3	0	0	0	—		3	0
Career total			92	6	2	0	0	0	94	6
