= Rey Ortiz =

Professional footballer

Personal information
- Date of birth: January 6, 1997 (age 29)
- Place of birth: Acapulco, Mexico
- Height: 5 ft 5 in (1.65 m)
- Position: Attacking midfielder

Youth career
- 2006–2013: Carlsbad Elite
- 2013–2016: LA Galaxy

College career
Years	Team	Apps	(Gls)
2016–2019	Portland Pilots	64	(14)

Senior career*
Years	Team	Apps	(Gls)
2015	LA Galaxy II	2	(0)
2017–2019	Portland Timbers U23s	16	(1)
2020	FC Cincinnati	0	(0)
2020	→ Charlotte Independence (loan)	16	(1)
2021–2022	Chattanooga Red Wolves	40	(4)

International career^{‡}
2013	United States U15		
- * Club domestic league appearances and goals as of October 16, 2022 ‡ National team caps and goals as of February 20, 2020

Rey Ortiz (born January 6, 1997) is a professional soccer player who plays as an attacking midfielder. Born in Mexico, he represented the United States national under-15 team.

== Career ==
=== Youth and college ===
Ortiz played with the LA Galaxy academy for three years. While part of the Galaxy academy, Ortiz appeared for their United Soccer League side LA Galaxy II, making an 86th-minute substitute appearance on August 15, 2015, during a 3–2 win over Austin Aztex.

In 2016, Ortiz attended the University of Portland to play college soccer. During his time with the Pilots, Ortiz made 64 appearances, scoring 14 goals and tallying 26 assists.

While at college, Ortiz played with USL PDL side Portland Timbers U23s during their 2017, 2018 and 2019 seasons.

=== Professional ===
On January 9, 2020, Ortiz was selected 29th overall in the 2020 MLS SuperDraft by FC Cincinnati. He was signed by the club on February 21, 2020.

On February 28, 2020, Ortiz was loaned to USL Championship side Charlotte Independence for the entirety of the 2020 season.

Ortiz was released by Cincinnati at the end of their 2020 season.

On June 4, 2021, Ortiz signed with USL League One side Chattanooga Red Wolves.

== International ==
Born in Acapulco, Mexico and raised in California, United States, Ortiz is eligible to represent both countries. He has appeared for the United States at U-14 and U-15 level.
