= José Carrera-García =

Mexican footballer (born 1995)

Personal information
- Full name: José Carrera García
- Date of birth: 20 July 1995 (age 31)
- Place of birth: Chalchicomula de Sesma, Puebla, Mexico
- Height: 1.65 m (5 ft 5 in)
- Position: Midfielder

Team information
- Current team: Forward Madison
- Number: 21

Youth career
- 2011–2012: Arsenal FC US Academy

College career
Years	Team	Apps	(Gls)
2013–2017	California Golden Bears	72	(17)

Senior career*
Years	Team	Apps	(Gls)
2015	PSA Elite		
2016–2017	Golden State Force	15	(9)
2018–2019	Celaya	20	(0)
2020	Las Vegas Lights	13	(0)
2021–2022	Chattanooga Red Wolves	56	(4)
2023–2024	Central Valley Fuego	45	(5)
2025–	Forward Madison	9	(0)
- * Club domestic league appearances and goals as of 13:30, 1 November 2025 (UTC)

José Carrera-García (born 20 July 1995) is a Mexican professional footballer who plays as a midfielder for Forward Madison in USL League One.

== Career ==
Carrera-García signed with Chattanooga Red Wolves in November 2020.

On December 21, 2022, Carrera-Garcia moved to Central Valley Fuego.

Carrera-García signed with USL League One club Forward Madison prior to the 2025 season.

== Career statistics ==
=== Club ===
As of 16 April 2019

Club	Season	League			Cup (Note: Includes Copa MX and U.S. Open Cup)		Continental		Other		Total	
Club	Season	Division	Apps	Goals	Apps	Goals	Apps	Goals	Apps	Goals	Apps	Goals
PSA Elite	2015	USASA	–		2	0	–		0	0	2	0
Golden State Force	2016	PDL	7	3	0	0	–		0	0	7	3
Golden State Force	2017	PDL	8	6	1	0	–		0	0	9	6
Golden State Force	Total		15	9	1	0	0	0	0	0	16	9
Celaya	2018–19	Ascenso MX	15	0	1	0	–		0	0	16	0
Career total			7	0	2	0	0	0	0	0	9	0
