= Daniel Nepomuceno Navarro =

American professional soccer player (born 1991)

Daniel Navarro
Personal information
- Full name: Daniel Nepomuceno Navarro
- Date of birth: August 22, 1991 (age 35)
- Place of birth: Hyannis, Massachusetts, United States
- Height: 6 ft 1 in (1.85 m)
- Positions: Defender; defensive midfielder

Youth career
- Avaí FC

Senior career*
Years	Team	Apps	(Gls)
2013	Toledo	5	(0)
2014	São José-PA	5	(0)
2014–2015	Santo André		
2015	Dom Bosco		
2015	Fort Lauderdale Strikers	5	(0)
2017	SC São Paulo	1	(0)
2018–2019	El Paso Locomotive	3	(0)
2019	→ Chattanooga Red Wolves (loan)	3	(0)
2020	Oakland Roots	4	(0)
2021–2022	Chattanooga Red Wolves	37	(1)
2023–2024	North Carolina FC	14	(0)
- * Club domestic league appearances and goals as of November 13, 2024

Daniel Nepomuceno Navarro (born August 22, 1991) is an American professional soccer player.

== Career ==
=== Professional ===
After time playing in Brazil, Navarro moved to North American Soccer League side Fort Lauderdale Strikers on April 3, 2015.

On December 4, 2016, Sport Club São Paulo announced the signing of the player for the Campeonato Gaúcho 2017 and Campeonato Brasileiro Série D 2017.

In September 2018, Navarro was announced as a new acquisition for USL Championship side El Paso Locomotive FC ahead of their inaugural season in 2019. He was later loaned to USL League One side Chattanooga Red Wolves SC in July 2019 for the remainder of the season.

In February 2020, Navarro signed with Oakland Roots SC of the National Independent Soccer Association.

On February 6, 2021, Navarro returned to Chattanooga Red Wolves on a permanent deal.

Navarro missed the first half of the 2022 season with injury, but returned to help with the club's run to the league playoff final. At the end of the 2022 season, he was given All League First Team honors and announced as a finalist for USL League One Defender of the Year.

On December 12, 2022, Navarro signed with North Carolina FC as a free agent.
