= Andrés Hernández (footballer) =

Venezuelan footballer (born 1993)

Personal information
- Full name: Andrés Alejandro Hernández Hernández
- Date of birth: 21 April 1993 (age 33)
- Place of birth: Caracas, Venezuela
- Height: 1.71 m (5 ft 7 in)
- Position: Defensive midfielder

Youth career
- 2009–2010: San Agustin
- 2011–2012: Deportivo La Guaira

Senior career*
Years	Team	Apps	(Gls)
2012–2014	Deportivo La Guaira	6	(0)
2014–2018	Portuguesa	83	(3)
2019	Frej	0	(0)
2019	CAI de La Chorrera	11	(0)
2020–2021	Aragua	33	(1)
2022	Chattanooga Red Wolves	16	(1)
- * Club domestic league appearances and goals as of 16 October 2022

Andrés Alejandro Hernández Hernández (born 21 April 1993) is a Venezuelan professional footballer who plays as a defensive midfielder.

== Career ==
Hernández's joined the San Agustin FC U-17 team and helped the club to back-to-back championships in 2009 and 2010. After a successful championship run, Hernández joined Deportivo La Guaira, then known as Real Esppor Club, and helped the U-20 team to back-to-back championships in 2011 and 2012. He made his debut for the club in 2012, appearing in the Copa Venezuela and scoring a goal.

In 2014, he moved to Portuguesa of the Venezuelan Segunda División, helping Portuguesa win the league to secure promotion to the Venezuelan Primera División He spent four years with Portuguesa before transferring to IK Frej of the Swedish Superettan. He did not play a first team fixture in Sweden, transferring to CAI de La Chorrera of the Liga Panameña de Fútbol. After a season in Panama, Hernández returned to Venezuela and played two seasons with Aragua in 2020 and 2021.

On 9 April 2022, Hernández signed with USL League One club Chattanooga Red Wolves.
