= Jorge Páez (footballer) =

Venezuelan football player (born 1995)

Personal information
- Full name: Jorge Alberto Páez Santamaría
- Date of birth: 19 August 1995 (age 31)
- Place of birth: Mérida, Mérida, Venezuela
- Height: 5 ft 8 in (1.73 m)
- Position: Attacking midfielder

Team information
- Current team: Estudiantes de Mérida
- Number: 10

Youth career
- Academia Emeritense

College career
Years	Team	Apps	(Gls)
2015–2016	Monroe Mustangs	31	(18)

Senior career*
Years	Team	Apps	(Gls)
–2013	Academia Emeritense		
2013–2014	Zamora	5	(0)
2018–2019	Zamora	15	(2)
2020	LALA		
2021	Portuguesa	26	(5)
2022	Chattanooga Red Wolves	13	(1)
2023–	Estudiantes de Mérida	29	(7)
- * Club domestic league appearances and goals as of 3 April 2024

Jorge Alberto Páez Santamaría (born 19 August 1995) is a Venezuelan professional footballer who plays as an attacking midfielder for Estudiantes de Mérida.

== Club career ==
Páez started his career with local side Academia Emeritense, before moving to Venezuelan Primera División's Zamora in 2013. In 2015, Páez moved to the United States to play college soccer at Monroe College, where he went on to play two seasons, making 31 appearances, scoring 18 goals and tallying five assists.

Páez returned to Zamora, before spells at LALA FC and Portuguesa. On 12 January 2022, he was back in the United States, signing with USL League One club Chattanooga Red Wolves.
