= Jonny Guadarrama =

American soccer player

Personal information
- Full name: Jonathan Guadarrama
- Date of birth: March 5, 1999 (age 27)
- Place of birth: Logan, Utah, United States
- Height: 1.78 m (5 ft 10 in)
- Position: Left-back

Youth career
- Real Salt Lake

College career
Years	Team	Apps	(Gls)
2017–2018	Salt Lake Bruins	19	(8)
2021	Montevallo Falcons	16	(3)

Senior career*
Years	Team	Apps	(Gls)
2019–2021	Park City Red Wolves	14	(4)
2022–2023	Chattanooga Red Wolves	8	(0)
- * Club domestic league appearances and goals as of April 12, 2024

Jonathan Guadarrama (born March 5, 1999) is an American soccer player who plays as a left-back.

== Career ==
=== Youth ===
Guadarrma attended Logan High School, also playing for various club teams including; The Aggies, La Roca, Northern Utah United and Infinity, before joining the Real Salt Lake academy.

=== College and amateur ===
In 2017, Guadarrama attended Salt Lake Community College, going on to make 19 appearances, scoring eight goals and tallying eight assists over two seasons with the Bruins. Guadarrama completed a third college season, playing at the University of Montevallo and making 16 appearances and scoring three goals for the Falcons.

In 2019 and 2021, Guadarrama also played in the USL League Two for Park City Red Wolves.

=== Professional ===
On January 19, 2022, Guadarrama signed with USL League One club Chattanooga Red Wolves ahead of their 2022 season. He made his professional debut on April 6, 2022, appearing as an 85th–minute substitute during a 1–0 loss to Louisville City FC in the Lamar Hunt U.S. Open Cup.
